= Gaza war protest vote movements =

Protest votes targeting the 2024 Democratic Party presidential primaries

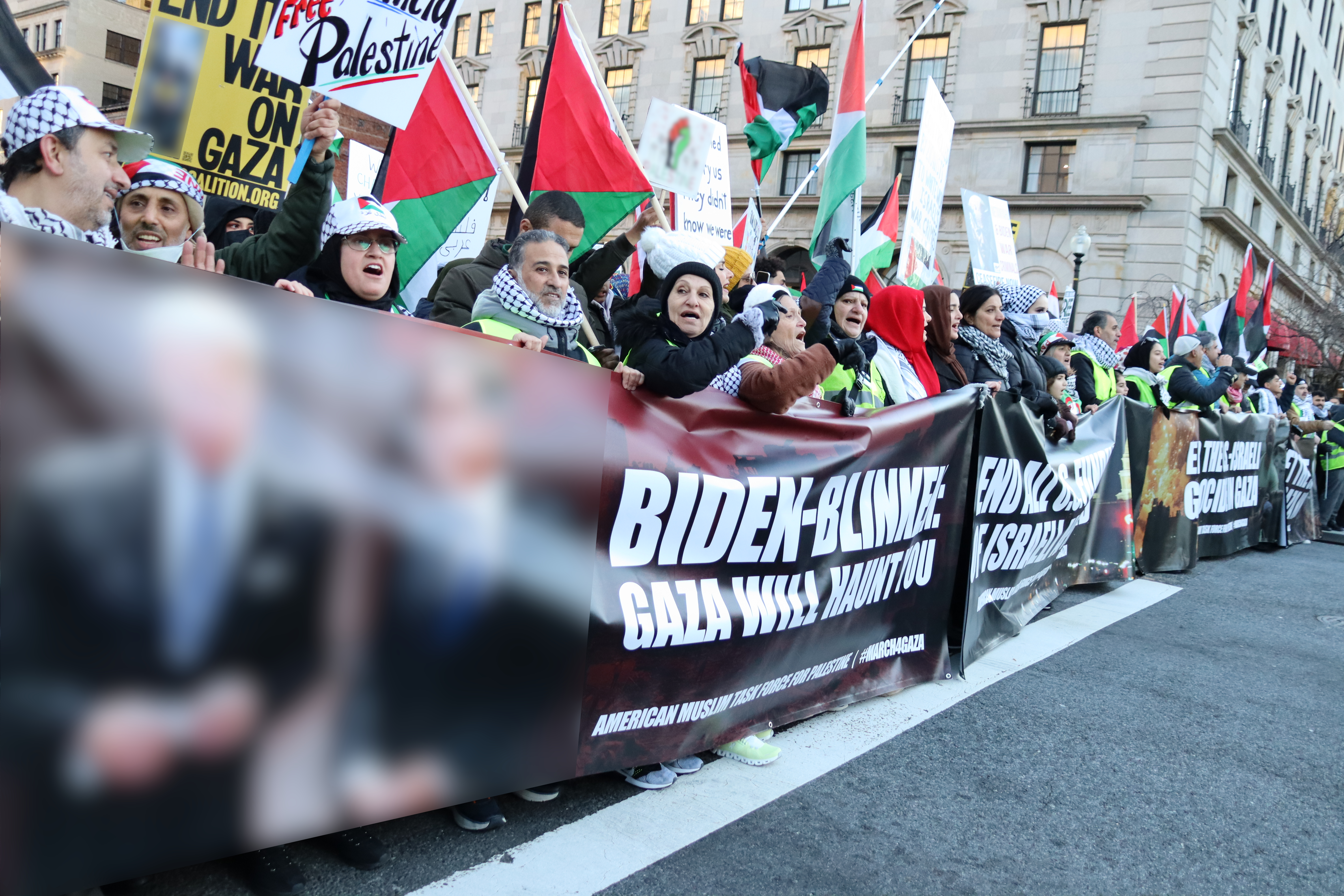
March on Washington for Gaza in January 2024

As part of the Gaza war protests in the United States, protest vote movements in the 2024 Democratic Party presidential primaries were initiated to target President Joe Biden's and Vice President Kamala Harris's reelection campaigns. After a notable "uncommitted" vote in Michigan, activists sought to replicate the protest in other states. While some activists under Abandon Biden/Abandon Harris argued against supporting the Democratic ticket entirely during the 2024 presidential election, others in uncommitted movements led by the Uncommitted National Movement urged to use uncommitted votes during the presidential primary to pressure the Biden administration to change policies before the presidential election. Both groups overlap and supported each other's goals, to the point of being considered "twin" movements. On July 21, 2024, Biden withdrew from the 2024 presidential election and endorsed Harris as his replacement.

The movements were the main opposition to the Biden 2024 presidential campaign in the Democratic primaries and received higher vote totals than many contenders in the 2020 Democratic Party presidential primaries, including Harris, Amy Klobuchar, Cory Booker, and Beto O'Rourke. Uncommitted votes also achieved a higher percentage of the vote than the 2020 campaign of Pete Buttigieg, with only a fraction of the spending. The Uncommitted campaign won 36 delegates in the primaries. The Uncommitted movement received its best results in the Hawaii caucus and the Minnesota primary. Following the Minnesota primary, Minnesota governor Tim Walz was sympathetic to the Uncommitted movement. After Biden's withdrawal from the race, the movement demanded that Harris, the 2024 presumptive Democratic nominee, oppose U.S. military aid to Israel, the Gaza genocide, and Israeli occupation of Palestinians. Harris selected Walz as her running mate on August 6, 2024. By October 2024, Uncommitted tended to encourage its supporters to vote for Harris, while Abandon Harris endorsed Green Party candidate Jill Stein.

== Ceasefire movement ==
On January 18, 2024, voters promoting a ceasefire in the Gaza war launched a write-in campaign for "Ceasefire" in the New Hampshire Democratic primary. Since incumbent president Joe Biden had declined to appear on the ballot due to Democratic National Convention sanctions, with allies instead mounting a write-in campaign, advocates of the ceasefire campaign hoped that the increased focus on the write-in section of election results would send a message. New Hampshire secretary of state David Scanlan indicated that these "Ceasefire" votes were tallied. Ultimately, "Ceasefire" received 1,497 votes, or 1.28%.

== Uncommitted movements ==
The uncommitted movements are protest vote movements built around urging voters to write-in or check an uncommitted voting option to protest Biden's support for the Gaza war, and to push for a permanent ceasefire and ending military aide to Israel. The movements aims to "make these changes ahead of the general election or risk losing Democratic voter support".

=== 2024 Michigan Democratic primary ===
A movement for an uncommitted vote called Listen to Michigan was started by community organizers in Dearborn, including the younger sister to representative Rashida Tlaib with a budget of $250,000. The group aimed to use the uncommitted vote during the presidential primary to send a message to the Biden campaign to support a ceasefire, or else lose the presidential election. Both Rashida Tlaib and Dearborn mayor Abdullah Hammoud endorsed the campaign. Democratic Majority for Israel ran opposition ads against the uncommitted movement, arguing that a vote for uncommitted would represent support for Trump. Our Revolution endorsed the uncommitted movement and also helped support outreach for it.

The movement was primarily led by a vocal minority of Muslim Americans, Arab Americans, and progressives. Although the campaign aimed originally for 10,000 votes, which was the margin by which Hillary Clinton lost in the 2016 election, which was considered a low vote total historically, the final vote count exceeded it and reach 101,000 votes, or approximately 13.2% of the vote. As a result, the campaign won 2 delegates to send to the 2024 Democratic National Convention. While some progressive commentators, such as Michael Moore, stated that Biden's actions in Gaza could ultimately lose him the general election, others, including Biden campaign officials, argued that the result matched similar uncommitted movements in 2008 and 2012. In March 2024, Listen to Michigan announced it was expanding into a national operation.

An August 2024 survey published by the Council on American-Islamic Relations (CAIR) found that 29% of Muslim voters planned to vote for the Greens candidate Jill Stein because of the Gaza war. In Michigan, 40% of Muslim voters supported Stein, 18% supported Trump, and 12% supported Harris. CAIR's final election poll, published on November 1, showed that nationwide among Muslims, 42.3% planned to vote for Stein, 41% for Harris, and 9.8% for Trump.

As of November 15, 2024, the Stein ticket garnered 751,170 votes, the second highest of her three campaigns, beating her 2012 run but falling short of her 2016 bid. This was the first time since the 2000 presidential election that the Green Party placed third place in the popular vote. Nationally, exit polling from CAIR found that 53% of Muslim-American voters supported Stein. In Michigan, 59% of Muslim-American voters supported Stein. In Maryland, 81% of Muslim-American voters supported her. Notably, Stein won 18.4% of the vote in Dearborn, Michigan, 15.1% of the vote in Dearborn Heights, Michigan, 15% of the vote in South Paterson, New Jersey, and 9% of the vote in Hamtramck, Michigan.

=== Abandon Biden movement ===
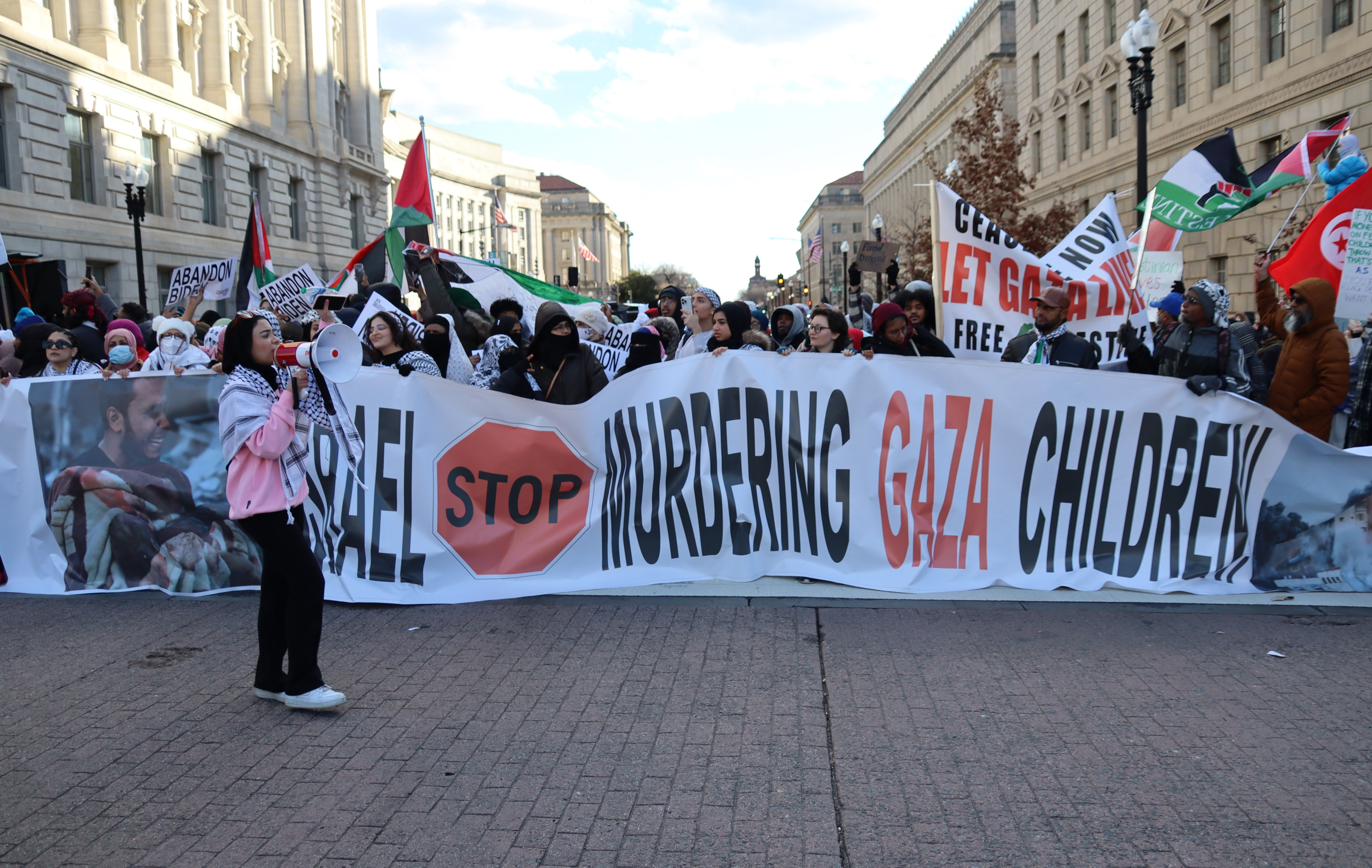
Pro-Palestinian protest in Washington, D.C.

Abandon Biden was originally started in Minnesota but has since spread to other swing states, with the goal of preventing a second-term Biden presidency. Many in the Abandon Biden movement have argued that Biden cannot undo damages, even if he called for a ceasefire and some within the movement have argued even for voting for Republicans in order to deny Biden a victory and to force both parties to pay attention to their cause, although others said they would never vote for Trump and would instead write a third-party candidate or abstain. The Abandon Biden and Uncommitted campaigns were described as “twin movements” which were overlapping.

Khalid Turaani, one of the leaders of the Abandon Biden movement, stated that "If you want to bet on brushing off this movement, good luck in November ... We want to make sure that Joe Biden is going to be a one-term president, and we’ll make sure that his loss will be coupled with a disgrace of the genocide in Gaza."

During his campaign, Trump notably suggested total war in Gaza, deporting refugees from Gaza, revoking visas of pro-Palestinian demonstrators, and reinstituting a "Muslim ban", which many Democrats have argued would allow them to win Muslim votes. In addition, although Biden won many swing states by small margins, the Muslim American and Arab American proportion in most of those states constitutes a very small proportion of the electorate. Some commentators argued that small margins of victory in swing states may suggest that the groups could have outsized effects. Michigan is noted as among the swing states with more than 200,000 Muslim voters, and 300,000 Arab Americans, well exceeding Biden's vote margin in 2020, and some have pointed out that disapproval with the conflict could be spreading to other groups such as youth and progressives. An opinion video piece argued in the aftermath of Biden's first debate and subsequent calls to withdraw from the race that Biden's biggest issue was still engagement from Arab and Muslim voters in swing states such as Michigan.

=== 2024 presidential primaries ===
==== Primary elections ====
After the Michigan result, organizers in several states launched similar campaigns, even though most states do not have a dedicated "uncommitted" option, which can make organizing a protest vote more difficult. Minnesota organizers launched a protest vote movement for "uncommitted" with only four days before the primary. The movement was able to improve on Michigan's vote share, winning over 18% of the vote and 11 delegates. After the 2024 Minnesota Democratic presidential primary, Minnesota governor Tim Walz took a sympathetic view toward those doing so to protest President Biden's handling of the war in Gaza, calling them "civically engaged". Walz said: "This issue is a humanitarian crisis. They have every right to be heard. These folks are asking for a change in course, they're asking for more pressure to be put on. ... You can hold competing things: that Israel has the right to defend itself, and the atrocities of October 7 are unacceptable, but Palestinian civilians being caught in this... has got to end." Walz also said he supports a ceasefire in Gaza.

In North Carolina, where no actual candidates made the ballot other than Biden, 12% voted for "no preference", which some sources attributed to groups protesting Biden's support for Israel. Several observes noted that although the movement had "spread to other base Democratic voters" besides Muslim Americans, results from Super Tuesday suggested the Democratic Party "continues to coalesce around Biden". A Black Muslim group called the Black Muslim Leadership Council worked towards supporting the uncommitted movement but argued they would not necessarily abandon Biden during the presidential election.

In Hawaii, the uncommitted vote achieved 455 votes, or nearly 29% of the vote total, which net the movement 6 delegates. This occurred despite that Hawaii did not appear to have any specific organized uncommitted movement organization. In Georgia, a coalition of multi-ethnic, multi-faith progressives launched a Listen to Georgia Coalition to replicate a similar protest movement. Because Georgia does not release write-in candidate results, a local news organization looked at blank ballots instead, finding 3% of Democratic primary voters had submitted blank ballots within 5 counties. An effort was organized in Washington, where uncommitted achieved slightly over 9% of the vote. In Kentucky, some of the 17.9% uncommitted vote was attributed to the protest vote movement. Rhode Island sent at least 1 uncommitted delegate. A "Vote No Preference" coalition in Massachusetts focused on pushing a No Preference vote. A similar effort had been replicated in Connecticut, Pennsylvania, New Jersey, and other states; however, few races after Super Tuesday have dedicated uncommitted options, and those which did not had few progressive, Muslim, or Arab American votes.

==== Delegate votes ====
After Biden released delegates, following his decision to withdraw from the race, some uncommitted delegates held endorsements for Harris unless demands for a ceasefire were met. On August 4, 2024, twenty-nine uncommitted delegates from eight states took part in a virtual roll call where they voted for Palestinian victims over Harris. On the second day of the Democratic National Convention, during the in-person ceremonial roll call of delegates, dozens of delegates voted "Present" as a protest vote. Some of these delegates publicly expressed they voted this way to express frustration with the Biden-Harris administration's handling of the war in Gaza. The delegates who voted "Present" had their votes read out loud by their state delegations during the roll call, notably except for the Kentucky Democratic Party.

==== Uncommitted results by state ====
Uncommitted vote percentage in the 2024 Democratic Party presidential primaries

Primary	Votes	Percentage of popular vote	Uncommitted delegates	Ref.
Nevada	7,448	5.81%	0	
Michigan	101,436	13.21%	2	
Alabama	11,213	6%	0	
Colorado	43,439	8.1%	0	
Massachusetts	58,462	9.4%	1	
Minnesota	45,913	18.9%	11	
North Carolina	88,021	12.7%	0	
Tennessee	10,464	7.9%	0	
Hawaii	455	29.1%	7	
Democrats Abroad	1,136	13.2%	0	
Washington	89,753	9.8%	2	
Kansas	4,286	10.3%	0	
Missouri	2,229	11.7%	3	
Connecticut	7,492	11.5%	0	
Rhode Island	3,732	14.9%	1	
Wisconsin	48,162	8.3%	0	
Maryland	63,743	9.7%	0	
Kentucky	32,908	17.9%	8	
New Jersey	43,758	8.9%	1	
Final results	706,591	4.25%	37	

== Impact ==
=== Impact during primary process ===
Some argued that as a result of the uncommitted movement, Kamala Harris began calling for a 6-week ceasefire in the region. Because the uncommitted option received varied votes in each state during the primary, analysts found it "hard to compare apples-to-apples" the impact of the movement, especially with regards to past historical uncommitted vote results. Although Biden supporters and some analysts generally suggested that the uncommitted vote was similar to historical patterns, some progressives including Ro Khanna argued that the pattern of the vote suggested "particular groups of our coalition that are upset". Some uncommitted results in states with historic Blue Dog Democrat populations (for example, North Carolina and Kentucky) were attributed to conservative DINOs (i.e. Democrats in Name Only) who vote uncommitted during the primary but had become Republican (reflecting the Southern strategy of the 1960s) and would never have voted Democrat during a general election. Some analysts argued that as the groups who voted uncommitted were in Biden's base, they would eventually vote for him in the general election, although the possibility of his base fracturing before the election remained.

Much of the uncommitted base seemed to be made up of young college students and Arab Americans. Young people, the group most likely to support Palestinians, did not appear to have the Gaza war as their main concern in many opinion polls. By May 2024, several progressive groups critical of Biden's Gaza policy began anti-Trump campaigns that were noted to indirectly help Biden. The New York Times said it was "one of the clearest signs yet that at least some of Mr. Biden's critics on the left will still work to stop Mr. Trump — even if they are lukewarm on the incumbent president." On October 8, Uncommitted encouraged its supporters to vote for Harris, arguing a second Trump presidency would be much worse for Palestinians.

The uncommitted vote revealed a vulnerability amongst young voters caused by Biden's policy on Israel and Palestine. The movement received higher vote totals than many contenders in the 2020 Democratic Party presidential primaries, including Harris (the eventual presumptive Democratic nominee in 2024), Amy Klobuchar, Cory Booker, and Beto O'Rourke. Uncommitted votes also achieved a higher percentage of the vote than the 2020 campaign of Pete Buttigieg, with only a fraction of the spending. The Uncommitted campaign won 36 delegates in the primaries. On July 21, 2024, Biden withdrew from the 2024 presidential election. Former New Jersey state representative Sadaf Jeffer said the vote "shows what many have been saying, that [there] is significant dissatisfaction with President Biden's approach to Gaza. This is a constituency Democratic Party leadership and the Biden administration must engage."

=== Withdrawal of Joe Biden ===
On July 21, 2024, Biden withdrew from the presidential race due to illness. Biden was the first incumbent president since the withdrawal of Lyndon B. Johnson from the 1968 United States presidential election to exit the race, the first since the 19th century to withdraw after serving only one term, (Note: All three incumbents in the 20th century to withdraw or not seek reelection—Calvin Coolidge, Harry S. Truman, and Lyndon B. Johnson—had succeeded to the presidency when their predecessor died, then won a second term in their own right. Three presidents in the 1800s made and kept pledges to serve only one term, most recently Rutherford B. Hayes.) and the first ever to withdraw after already winning the Democratic Party presidential primaries. Following Biden's withdrawal from the race, the movement demanded Harris "to take a clear stance against weapons for Israel's war and occupation against Palestinians". Some uncommitted voters who had been disenchanted by Biden were noted to be "watching Harris closely to see how she distinguishes herself from Biden on the issue". On August 6, Harris selected Minnesota governor Tim Walz as her running mate.

By October 2024, Uncommitted encouraged its supporters to vote for Harris, arguing a second Trump presidency would be worse for Palestinians. Lexi Zeidan, a Palestinian American and co-founder of Uncommitted, said how another Trump presidency would dismantle "any pathway to Palestinian self-determination", and concluded: "It's clear Netanyahu will be doing everything in his power to get Trump elected. And we have to do everything in our power to stop him." On the other hand, Abandon Harris endorsed Green Party candidate Jill Stein, who said she would end all military support to Israel if elected, and the group said that it was "confronting two destructive forces: one currently overseeing a genocide and another equally committed to continuing it".

=== Loss of Kamala Harris ===
Following the loss of Harris, many in the movement felt vindication. Significant portions of the electorate in Dearborn, Michigan, an Arab American majority city, did not vote for Harris. Muslims who voted for Trump, and were thus pivotal in helping him win the three key states of the Rust Belt (Michigan, Pennsylvania, and Wisconsin being Harris's clearer path for a narrow win in the Electoral College), were subsequently upset that Trump nominated pro-Israel cabinet picks, including Marco Rubio (a staunch supporter of Israel who said he would not call for a ceasefire in Gaza and believed Israel should destroy "every element of Hamas", calling them "vicious animals") as Secretary of State, Mike Huckabee (a former Arkansas governor and staunch pro-Israel conservative who expressed his support for the Israeli occupation of the West Bank and called a two-state solution "unworkable") as the next United States ambassador to Israel, and Republican Representative Elise Stefanik (who called the United Nations a "cesspool of antisemitism" for its condemnation of deaths in Gaza) to serve as the United States ambassador to the United Nations. Rabiul Chowdhury, who chaired the Abandon Harris campaign in Pennsylvania, said that "Trump won because of us and we're not happy with his Secretary of State pick and others."

== See also ==
- Free Palestine Party, a European political alliance, participated in the 2024 European parliament election
- Gaza List, participated in the 2024 Austrian legislative election
- Independent Alliance (UK), technical group of anti-Gaza war independent MPs elected in the 2024 United Kingdom general election
- The Muslim Vote, British pressure group established in December 2023
