= 2024 Massachusetts Democratic presidential primary =

- March 5, 2024

116 delegates (92 pledged, 24 unpledged) to the Democratic National Convention

Candidate	Joe Biden	No Preference
Home state	Delaware	–
Delegate count	91	1
Popular vote	533,096	60,236
Percentage	80.5%	9.1%

Biden
60 – 70%
70 – 80%
80 – 90%
90 – 100%
Tie
40 – 50%

The 2024 Massachusetts Democratic presidential primary took place on March 5, 2024, as part of the Democratic Party primaries for the 2024 presidential election. 92 delegates to the Democratic National Convention were allocated, with 24 additional unpledged delegates. The contest was held on Super Tuesday alongside primaries in 14 other states and territories.

Incumbent Joe Biden won the primary with just over 80% of votes, as a campaign for "no preference" delegates, inspired by similar success in Michigan and on the same day in Minnesota, received 1 district delegate as the result of a protest vote against American support during the Gaza war, and placed ahead of challengers Dean Phillips and Marianne Williamson by collecting 9% of votes. It was one of three primaries on Super Tuesday, in which not all delegates were awarded for Biden.

== Candidates ==
Incumbent President Joe Biden announced on April 25, 2023, his bid for a second term. He faced primary challenges from author, progressive activist, and 2020 presidential candidate Marianne Williamson and U.S. Representative from MN 3, Dean Phillips. The following candidates were placed on the ballot by the Secretary of the Commonwealth:

- Joe Biden
- Dean Phillips
- Marianne Williamson

In addition, Massachusetts also places a no preference option on presidential primary ballots, and liberal activist Cenk Uygur was recognised as a write-in candidate.

=== Ballot access controversy ===
There are three ways for a presidential candidate to get on the primary ballot in Massachusetts: a candidate can be placed on the ballot by the state party, they can gather 2,500 signatures to achieve ballot access, or the Secretary of the Commonwealth can place candidates who have been "generally advocated or recognized in the national news media." The Massachusetts Democratic Party voted to submit only Biden's name to the state ballot, which was highly criticized by the Williamson campaign, which did not attempt to file any signatures. Ultimately, both Phillips and Williamson were placed on the ballot by Secretary of the Commonwealth William Galvin.

== Endorsements ==
Joe Biden

U.S. Senators

- Ed Markey, U.S. Senator from Massachusetts (2013–present), U.S. Representative for MA-07 (1976–2013)
- Elizabeth Warren, U.S. Senator from Massachusetts (2013–present), candidate for president in 2020

U.S. Representatives

- Seth Moulton, U.S. Representative from MA-06 (2015–present), candidate for president in 2020

Statewide officials

- Maura Healey, 73rd Governor of Massachusetts (2023–present), 44th Massachusetts Attorney General (2015–2023)

Local officials

- Michelle Wu, Mayor of Boston, Massachusetts (2021–present)

Newspapers

- The Boston Globe
No preference

State representatives

- Erika Uyterhoeven, State Representative from SD-27th Middlesex

Local officials

- Willie Burnley Jr., Somerville City Councilor at-large (2022–present)

Organizations

- National organization and Cape Cod and River Valley chapters of the Democratic Socialists of America
- IfNotNow Boston
- Jewish Voice for Peace Action
- Massachusetts Peace Action

== Polling ==
=== Hypothetical polling ===
Hypothetical polling

Poll source	Date(s) administered	Sample size (Note: Key: A – all adults RV – registered voters LV – likely voters V – unclear)	Margin of error	Joe Biden	Pete Buttigieg	Hillary Clinton	Kamala Harris	Maura Healey	Gavin Newsom	Alexandria Ocasio-Cortez	Bernie Sanders	Elizabeth Warren	Other	Undecided
YouGov	Mar 28 – April 5, 2023	397 (RV)	–	28%	15%	–	6%	–	4%	–	21%	12%	4% (Note: Gretchen Whitmer with 4%)	10%
Emerson College	Sep 7–8, 2022	339 (LV)	–	54%	–	–	–	6%	–	–	–	–	11%	28%
YouGov	Aug 26–29, 2022	500 (LV)	± 5.1%	22%	17%	5%	9%	–	4%	6%	12%	15%	11% (Note: "Someone else" with 11%)	–
YouGov	Jun 15–21, 2022	588 (LV)	± 3.5%	26%	13%	7%	9%	–	–	6%	14%	14%	10% (Note: "Someone else" with 10%)	–

== Results ==
Massachusetts Democratic primary, March 5, 2024
Candidate	Votes	%	Delegates
Joe Biden (incumbent)	533,096	80.45	91
No Preference	60,236	9.09	1
Dean Phillips	29,728	4.49	0
Marianne Williamson	20,402	3.08	0
Cenk Uygur (write-in)	82	0.01	0
Other candidates (write-in) (Note: The names of non-disclosed write-in votes were published as "All Others".)	10,135	1.53	—
Blank ballots	8,930	1.35	—
Total	662,609	100%	92

=== Results by county ===
County	Joe Biden	No preference	Dean Phillips	Marianne Williamson	Other candidates	Cenk Uygur	Blanks	Total
County	#	#	#	#	#	#	#	#
Barnstable	27,391	1,586	1,023	641	335	0	281	31,257
Berkshire	12,231	983	425	476	184	3	148	14,450
Bristol	32,486	3,661	2,197	1,742	796	5	911	41,798
Dukes	2,407	198	92	73	31	0	28	2,829
Essex	58,857	5,527	3,375	2,212	1,139	3	990	72,103
Franklin	7,882	1,164	274	379	148	1	100	9,948
Hampden	25,183	2,620	1,351	1,450	654	38	410	31,706
Hampshire	17,172	2,502	587	657	341	2	240	21,501
Middlesex	147,722	18,555	7,992	4,956	2,508	9	2,261	184,003
Nantucket	870	63	22	19	18	0	2	994
Norfolk	62,481	6,512	3,561	2,084	1,275	7	889	76,809
Plymouth	39,381	3,136	2,360	1,458	624	2	655	47,616
Suffolk	46,125	8,289	2,733	1,824	1,142	0	1,063	61,176
Worcester	52,908	5,440	3,736	2,431	940	12	952	66,419
Total	533,096	60,236	29,728	20,402	10,135	82	8,930	662,609

== See also ==
- 2024 Massachusetts Republican presidential primary
- 2024 Democratic Party presidential primaries
- 2024 United States presidential election
- 2024 United States presidential election in Massachusetts
- 2024 United States elections
