= 2024 Massachusetts Republican presidential primary =

- March 5, 2024

40 Republican National Convention delegates

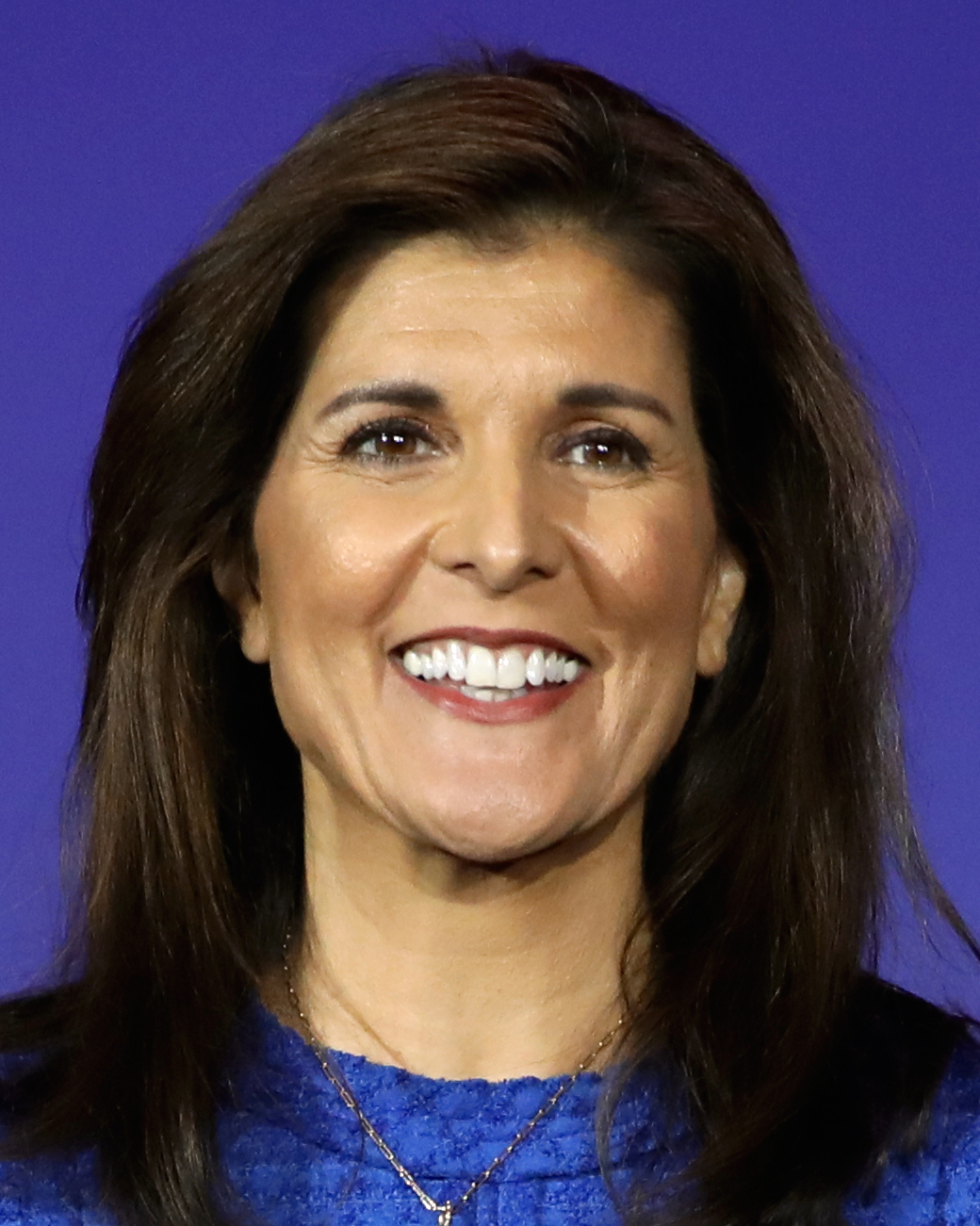
Candidate	Donald Trump	Nikki Haley
Home state	Florida	South Carolina
Delegate count	40	0
Popular vote	343,189	211,440
Percentage	59.56%	36.69%

Trump
40 – 50%
50 – 60%
60 – 70%
70 – 80%
80 – 90%
90 – 100%
Haley
40 – 50%
50 – 60%
60 – 70%
70 – 80%
80 – 90%
90 – 100%
Tie
40 – 50%

The 2024 Massachusetts Republican presidential primary was held on March 5, 2024, as part of the Republican Party primaries for the 2024 presidential election. 40 delegates to the 2024 Republican National Convention will be allocated on a winner-take-most basis. The contest was held on Super Tuesday alongside primaries in 14 other states.

== Endorsements ==
Donald Trump

Former state representative

- James J. Lyons Jr., 18th Essex District (2011–2019); chair of the Massachusetts Republican Party (2019–2023)

Former county officers

- Tom Hodgson, former Bristol County Sheriff (1997–2023) (working with Trump campaign in Massachusetts)

Organizations

- Massachusetts College Republicans
Ron DeSantis

State senators

- Peter Durant, Worcester and Hampshire District (2023–present)
Nikki Haley

State representatives

- Brad Jones, House Minority Leader (2002–present) from the 20th Middlesex district (1995–present) (campaign co-chair)
- Hannah Kane, 11th Worcester district (2015–present) (campaign co-chair)
- Kim Ferguson, 1st Worcester district
- Paul Frost, 7th Worcester district (1997–present)
- Joseph McKenna, 18th Worcester district (2015–present)
- Matthew Muratore, 1st Plymouth district (2015–present)
- Mike Soter, 8th Worcester district (2019–present)
- David Vieira, 3rd Barnstable district (2011–present)

Individuals

- Jennifer Nassour, former chair of the Massachusetts Republican Party (campaign co-chair)
- Mike Heffernan, former budget chief for former governor Charlie Baker (campaign co-chair)
- Peter deSilva, "business leader" (campaign co-chair)
Declined to endorse

State senators

- Bruce Tarr, Senate Minority Leader (2011–present) from the 1st Essex and Middlesex district (1995–present)

Individuals

- Amy Carnevale, chair of Massachusetts Republican Party (2023–present)

== Results ==
Massachusetts Republican primary, March 5, 2024
Candidate	Votes	Percentage	Actual delegate count		
Candidate	Votes	Percentage	Bound	Unbound	Total
Donald Trump	343,189	59.56%	40	0	40
Nikki Haley	211,440	36.69%	0	0	0
No Preference	5,717	0.99%	0	0	0
Chris Christie (withdrawn)	5,217	0.91%	0	0	0
Ron DeSantis (withdrawn)	3,981	0.69%	0	0	0
Vivek Ramaswamy (withdrawn)	1,738	0.30%	0	0	0
Other candidates	1,674	0.29%	0	0	0
Ryan Binkley (withdrawn)	619	0.11%	0	0	0
Asa Hutchinson (withdrawn)	527	0.09%	0	0	0
Blank ballots	2,148	0.37%	0	0	0
Total:	576,250	100.00%	40	0	40

2024 Massachusetts Republican primary (results per county)
County	Donald Trump		Nikki Haley		All Other Candidates		Total votes cast
County	Votes	%	Votes	%	Votes	%	Total votes cast
Barnstable	19,385	58.82%	12,544	38.06%	1,029	3.12%	32,958
Berkshire	3,834	56.46%	2,713	39.95%	244	3.59%	6,791
Bristol	32,609	70.49%	12,341	26.67%	1,313	2.84%	46,263
Dukes	635	51.67%	556	45.24%	38	3.09%	1,229
Essex	43,858	60.65%	26,393	36.50%	2,063	2.85%	72,314
Franklin	3,217	55.00%	2,416	41.31%	216	3.69%	5,849
Hampden	21,691	70.15%	8,308	26.87%	923	2.98%	30,922
Hampshire	6,144	58.06%	4,056	38.33%	382	3.61%	10,582
Middlesex	66,606	52.87%	54,904	43.58%	4,465	3.55%	125,975
Nantucket	416	52.66%	347	43.92%	27	3.42%	790
Norfolk	38,254	55.95%	28,041	41.01%	2,077	3.04%	68,372
Plymouth	40,300	64.88%	20,071	32.32%	1,740	2.80%	62,111
Suffolk	13,290	56.79%	9,371	40.05%	740	3.16%	23,401
Worcester	50,073	62.94%	27,052	34.01%	2,425	3.05%	79,550
Total	343,189	59.56%	211,440	36.69%	21,621	3.75%	576,250

== Polling ==
Source of poll aggregation	Dates administered	Dates updated	Nikki Haley	Donald Trump	Other/ Undecided (Note: Calculated by taking the difference of 100% and all other candidates combined.)	Margin
270ToWin	February 7–8, 2024	February 15, 2024	29.3%	63.0%	7.7%	Trump +33.7
FiveThirtyEight	through February 6, 2024	March 5, 2024	29.3%	66.6%	4.1%	Trump +37.3

Poll source	Date(s) administered	Sample size (Note: Key: A – all adults RV – registered voters LV – likely voters V – unclear)	Margin of error	Ron DeSantis	Nikki Haley	Mike Pence	Tim Scott	Donald Trump	Other	Undecided
YouGov (Note: Poll sponsored by the University of Massachusetts Amherst Department of Political Science & WCVB)	Oct 13–20, 2023	107 (V)	± 5.1%	15%	12%	3%	6%	54%	10% (Note: "Someone else" with 4%; Doug Burgum with 3%; Vivek Ramaswamy with 2%; Chris Christie with 1%)	–
UMass-Amherst	Mar 28 – Apr 5, 2023	154 (RV)	–	18%	4%	10%	1%	59%	8% (Note: Liz Cheney with 3%; "Someone else" with 5%)	–
UMass-Amherst	Mar 28 – Apr 5, 2023	154 (RV)	–	32%	–	–	–	68%	–	–
Opinion Diagnostics	Mar 31 – Apr 1, 2023	475 (LV)	± 4.5%	21%	9%	3%	–	45%	3%	19%
Opinion Diagnostics	Mar 31 – Apr 1, 2023	475 (LV)	± 4.5%	32%	–	–	–	46%	–	22%
UMass-Amherst	Jun 15–21, 2022	237 (RV)	–	24%	6%	6%	1%	51%	11% (Note: Mike Pompeo with 3%; "Someone else" with 8%)	–

== See also ==
- 2024 Republican Party presidential primaries
- 2024 Massachusetts Democratic presidential primary
- 2024 United States presidential election
- 2024 United States presidential election in Massachusetts
- 2024 United States elections

== Notes ==
Partisan clients
