= 1992 Alabama Democratic presidential primary =

- June 2, 1992

67 Democratic National Convention delegates (48 pledged, 19 unpledged)
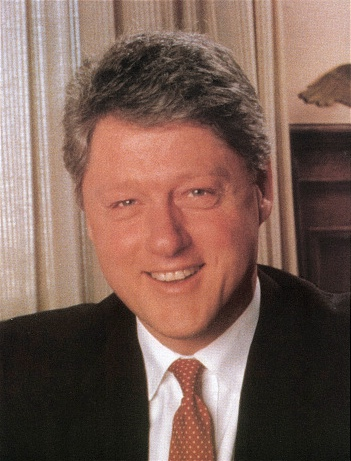

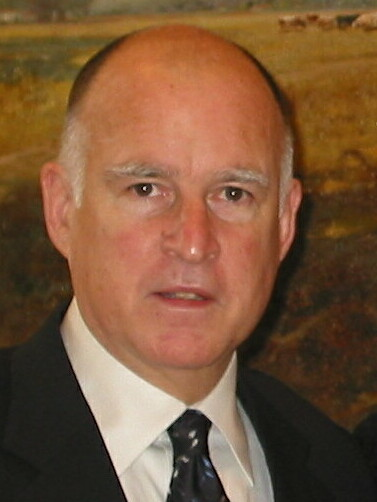
Candidate	Bill Clinton	Uncommitted	Jerry Brown
Home state	Arkansas	—	California
Delegate count	38	10	0
Popular vote	307,621	90,863	30,626
Percentage	68.22%	20.15%	6.79%

Clinton
50–60%
60–70%
70–80%
80–90%

A presidential primary was held in the U.S. state of Alabama on June 2, 1992, to elect delegates representing Alabama to the 1992 Democratic National Convention. Alabama was allotted sixty-seven delegates, thirty-six of which would be divided among the state's seven congressional districts, with twelve being divided among the candidates in proportion to their share of the statewide vote. The remaining delegates went to party leaders and elected officials, or "superdelegates."

Governor of Arkansas Bill Clinton won the state by a substantial margin, taking a large majority of both the congressional district delegates and the at-large delegates, picking up thirty-eight in total. Uncommitted delegates won ten seats at the convention. Alabama was part of a six-state sweep by Clinton that enabled him to clinch the Democratic nomination on June 6. Alabama's entire 67-member delegation cast votes for Clinton at the Convention roll call.

== Results ==
Alabama Democratic presidential primary, 1992
Candidate	Popular vote		Delegates		
Candidate	#	%	Pledged	Unpledged	Total
Bill Clinton	307,621	68.22%	38		38
Jerry Brown	30,626	6.79%	0		0
Charles Woods	15,247	3.38%	0		0
Lyndon LaRouche	6,542	1.45%	0		0
Uncommitted	90,863	20.15%	10		10
Total	450,899	100.00%	48	19	67

=== Delegate allocation ===
District	Bill Clinton	Uncommitted	Total
1st	5	0	5
2nd	4	1	5
3rd	4	1	5
4th	4	1	5
5th	3	2	5
6th	5	1	6
7th	4	1	5
CD total	29	7	36
At-large	9	3	12
Total	38	10	48
Source: The Birmingham Post-Herald

== See also ==
- 1992 Democratic Party presidential primaries
- 1992 United States presidential election
- 1992 United States presidential election in Alabama
- 1992 United States elections
