= 2024 Rhode Island Democratic presidential primary =

- April 2, 2024

35 delegates (26 pledged, 9 unpledged) to the Democratic National Convention

Candidate	Joe Biden	Uncommitted
Home state	Delaware	–
Delegate count	25	1
Popular vote	21,336	3,834
Percentage	80.7%	14.5%

Biden
60–70%
70–80%
80–90%
>90%

The 2024 Rhode Island Democratic presidential primary was held on April 2, 2024, as part of the Democratic Party primaries for the 2024 presidential election, alongside three other contests on the day. 26 delegates to the Democratic National Convention were allocated, with 9 additional unpledged delegates.

President Joe Biden won every county, but the campaign for uncommitted delegates, fueled by protest votes due to the Gaza war, came very close to 15% statewide and reached the threshold and 1 delegate in the 2nd congressional district. The Rhode Island chapter of the Democratic Socialists of America took a leading role in the Vote Uncommitted RI campaign, but the delegate spot was filled by a Jewish American anti-war activist.

== Candidates ==
The following candidates appeared on the ballot in Rhode Island:

- Joe Biden
- Dean Phillips (withdrawn)

Turkish-born activist Cenk Uygur and another individual Michael Vandal filed but did not collect necessary signatures. The ballot also included the option for Uncommitted.

== Endorsements ==
Joe Biden

US Senators

- Jack Reed, Rhode Island (1997–present), U.S. Representative from RI-02 (1991–97)
- Sheldon Whitehouse, Rhode Island (2007–present), Attorney General of Rhode Island (1999–2003)

US Representatives

- David Cicilline, RI-01 (2011–2023)
- Patrick J. Kennedy, RI-01 (1995–2011), son of Ted Kennedy

== Results ==
Rhode Island Democratic primary, April 2, 2024
Candidate	Votes	%	Delegates
Joe Biden (incumbent)	21,336	80.75	25
Uncommitted	3,834	14.51	1
Dean Phillips (withdrawn)	660	2.50	0
Write-in votes	593	2.24	—
Total	26,423	100%	26

== See also ==
- 2024 Rhode Island Republican presidential primary
- 2024 Democratic Party presidential primaries
- 2024 United States presidential election
- 2024 United States presidential election in Rhode Island
- 2024 United States elections
