= 2024 Hawaii Democratic presidential caucuses =

- March 6, 2024

31 delegates (22 pledged, 9 automatic) to the Democratic National Convention

Candidate	Joe Biden	Uncommitted
Home state	Delaware	–
Delegate count	15	7
Popular vote	1,047	463
Percentage	66.0%	29.2%

The 2024 Hawaii Democratic presidential caucuses took place on March 6, 2024, as part of the Democratic Party primaries for the 2024 presidential election. 22 delegates to the Democratic National Convention were allocated, with 9 additional unpledged delegates. The contest, held as a closed caucus one day after Super Tuesday, essentially was a party-run primary, which led to little turn-out. The Republican caucuses were held six days later.

As the incumbent, Joe Biden won the vote, while the "uncommitted" option won almost 30% of the vote, as it gained over 450 votes and seven delegates. The result was aided by the turn-out and notably not the consequence of an organised uncommitted movement like the Gaza war protests or the subsequent Uncommitted National Movement.

During the primaries, Biden only performed worse in American Samoa, which was won by Jason Palmer, and New Hampshire, where Biden was not technically on the ballot.

== Background ==
The party had held a primary in 2020 and initially planned to hold a vote by mail primary, but as the expenses would have proven too much, it chose to hold caucuses in 2024.

== Candidates ==
The following candidates were placed on the ballot by the state party:

- Joe Biden
- Jason Palmer
- Armando "Mando" Perez-Serrato
- Dean Phillips (withdrawn)
- Marianne Williamson

The party also included an option for uncommitted delegates.

== Results ==
2024 Hawaii Democratic pres. caucus
Candidate	Votes	%	Delegates
Joe Biden (incumbent)	1,047	65.97	15
Uncommitted	463	29.17	7
Marianne Williamson	50	3.15	0
Dean Phillips (withdrawn)	16	1.01	0
Jason Palmer	6	0.38	0
Armando Perez-Serrato	5	0.32	0
Total	1,587	100%	22

== See also ==
- 2024 Democratic Party presidential primaries
- 2024 United States presidential election
- 2024 United States presidential election in Hawaii
- 2024 United States elections
- 2024 Hawaii Republican presidential caucuses
