= 2024 Connecticut Democratic presidential primary =

- April 2, 2024

74 delegates (60 pledged and 14 unpledged) to the Democratic National Convention

Candidate	Joe Biden	Uncommitted
Home state	Delaware	–
Delegate count	60	0
Popular vote	55,533	7,619
Percentage	84.7%	11.6%

Biden
60–70%
70–80%
80–90%
>90%

The 2024 Connecticut Democratic presidential primary was held on April 2, 2024, as part of the Democratic Party primaries for the 2024 presidential election, alongside three other contests on the day. 60 delegates to the Democratic National Convention were allocated, with 14 additional unpledged delegates.

President Joe Biden won every county and all delegates. The option for uncommitted delegates, fueled by protest votes due to the Gaza war, received more than 11% of the vote.

== Candidates ==
The following candidates filed:

- Joe Biden
- Dean Phillips (withdrawn)
- Cenk Uygur (withdrawn)
- Marianne Williamson

The ballot also included an option for Uncommitted.

== Endorsements ==
Joe Biden

US Senators

- Richard Blumenthal, Connecticut (2011–present), 23rd Attorney General of Connecticut (1993–2011)
- Chris Murphy, (Note: Biden-Harris Campaign National Advisory Board member) Connecticut (2013–present), U.S. Representative from CT-05 (2007–13)

Statewide officials

- Ned Lamont, Governor of Connecticut (2019–present)
- Susan Bysiewicz, Lieutenant Governor of Connecticut (2019–present)

US Representatives

- Joe Courtney, CT-02 (2007–present)

Party officials

- Nancy DiNardo, Chair of the Connecticut Democratic Party (2005–2015, 2020–present)
Uncommitted

Local officials

- Joshua Michtom, Hartford City Councilmember at-large (2020–present)
- Abdul Osmanu, Hamden Legislative Councilmember from District 3 (2021-present)

Organizations

- National organization and Connecticut chapter of the Democratic Socialists of America
- Jewish Voice for Peace Action Connecticut
- Party for Socialism and Liberation Connecticut

== Results ==
Connecticut Democratic primary, April 2, 2024
Candidate	Votes	%	Delegates
Joe Biden (incumbent)	55,533	84.75	60
Marianne Williamson	1,490	2.27	0
Dean Phillips (withdrawn)	577	0.88	0
Cenk Uygur (withdrawn)	310	0.47	0
Uncommitted	7,619	11.63	0
Total	65,529	100%	60

== See also ==
- 2024 Connecticut Republican presidential primary
- 2024 Democratic Party presidential primaries
- 2024 United States presidential election in Connecticut
