= 2024 North Carolina Republican presidential primary =

- March 5, 2024

74 Republican National Convention delegates

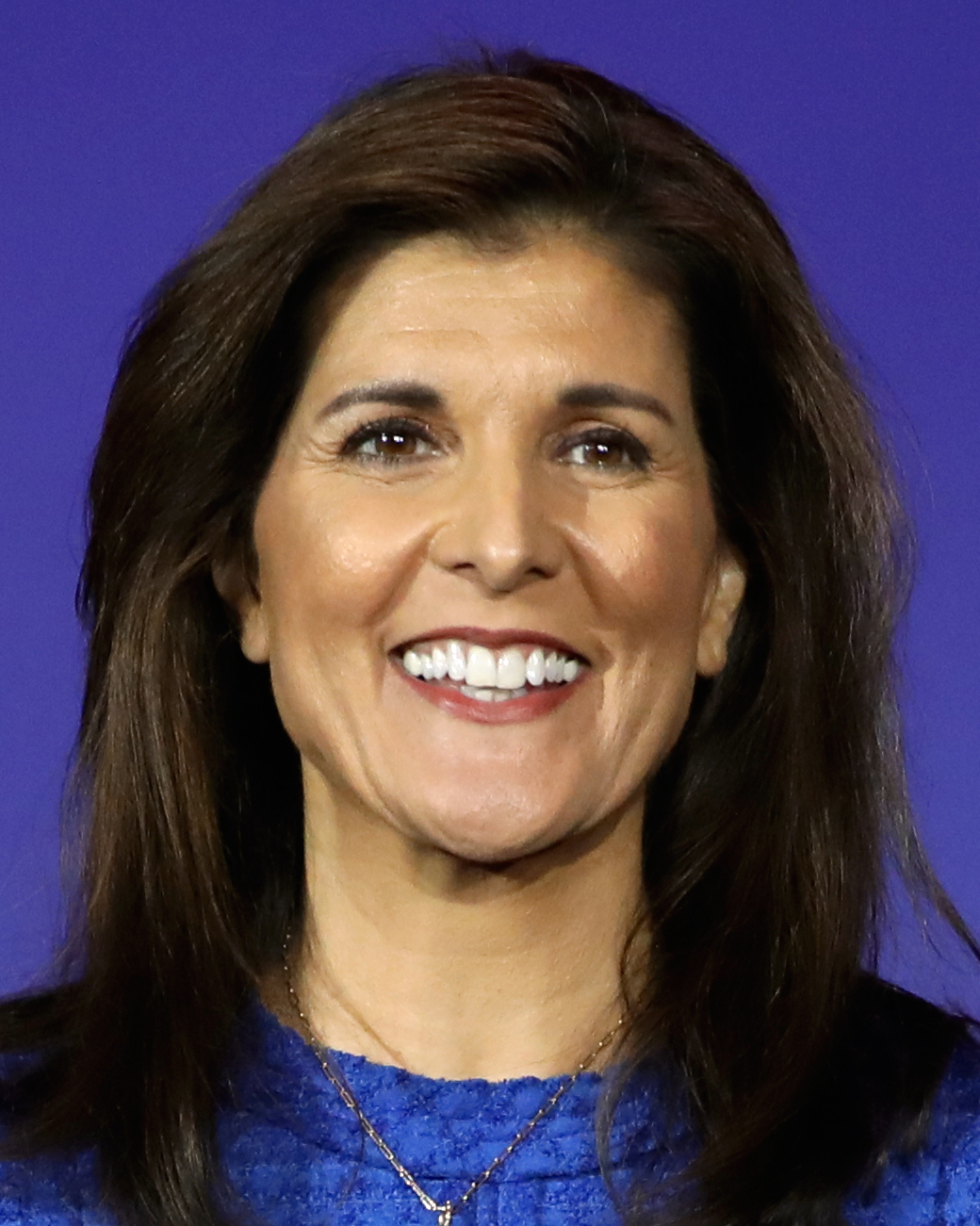
Candidate	Donald Trump	Nikki Haley
Home state	Florida	South Carolina
Delegate count	62	12
Popular vote	793,978	250,838
Percentage	73.84%	23.33%
County results
Trump
50 – 60%
60 – 70%
70 – 80%
80 – 90%
>90%

The 2024 North Carolina Republican presidential primary was held on March 5, 2024, as part of the Republican Party primaries for the 2024 presidential election. 74 delegates to the 2024 Republican National Convention were allocated on a proportional basis. The contest was held on Super Tuesday alongside primaries in 14 other states. Trump's best showing was in Bladen County, winning 90.4% of the vote there, while Haley's was in Mecklenburg County, where she won 44.8% of the vote.

== Endorsements ==
Ron DeSantis (withdrawn)

State judicial official

- Phil Berger Jr., Associate Supreme Court Justice (2021–present)

State senators

- Bobby Hanig, District 3 (2023–present) and District 1 (2022–2023)
- Jim Burgin, District 12 (2019–present)
- Danny Britt, District 24 (2023–present) and District 13 (2017–2023)

State representatives

- John Bell, District 10 (2013–present); Majority Leader (2016–present); Majority Whip (2014–2016)
- Matthew Winslow, District 7 (2021–present)
- Ken Fontenot, District 24 (2023–present)
- Allen Chesser, District 25 (2023–present)
- Jarrod Lowery, District 47 (2023–present)
- Steve Ross, District 63 (2013–2021 and 2023–present)
- Dennis Riddell, District 64 (2013–present)
- Wayne Sasser, District 67 (2019–present)
- David Willis, District 68 (2021–present)
- Keith Kidwell, District 79 (2019–present)
- Sam Watford, District 80 (2015–2019 and 2021–present)
- Kevin Crutchfield, District 83 (2023–present)
- Jeff McNeely, District 84 (2019–present)
- Jason Saine, District 97 (2011–present)
- Jennifer Balkcom, District 117 (2023–present)
Mike Pence (withdrawn)

Former state executive official

- Art Pope, Budget Director (2013–2014); Republican nominee for Lieutenant Governor in 1992
Donald Trump

Statewide official

- Mark Robinson, Lieutenant Governor (2021–present); candidate for Governor in 2024

U.S. Senator

- Ted Budd, (2023–present)

U.S. Representatives

- Madison Cawthorn, NC-11 (2021–2023)
- Virginia Foxx, NC-05 (2005–present)
- Richard Hudson, NC-08 (2013–present)

State representative

- Tim Moore, District 111 (2003–present); Speaker (2015–present)

Notable individuals

- Diamond, NewsMax host (deceased)
- Ryan Fournier, Students for Trump co-founder
- Silk, NewsMax host

== Maps ==
Endorsements by incumbent Republicans in the North Carolina Senate. Endorsed Ron DeSantis (3) (withdrawn) No endorsement (27)

Endorsements by incumbent Republicans in the North Carolina House of Representatives. Endorsed Ron DeSantis (15) (withdrawn) Endorsed Donald Trump (1) No endorsement (56)

== Results ==
Despite losing statewide as well as every county, Haley was able to win the cities of Mecklenburg, Asheville, Durham, Chapel Hill and Carrboro. All highly college educated cities, as well as heavily Democrat.

North Carolina Republican primary, March 5, 2024
Candidate	Votes	Percentage	Actual delegate count		
Candidate	Votes	Percentage	Bound	Unbound	Total
Donald Trump	793,978	73.84%	62		62
Nikki Haley	250,838	23.33%	12		12
Ron DeSantis (withdrawn)	14,740	1.37%			
No Preference	7,448	0.69%			
Vivek Ramaswamy (withdrawn)	3,418	0.32%			
Chris Christie (withdrawn)	3,166	0.29%			
Ryan Binkley (withdrawn)	916	0.09%			
Asa Hutchinson (withdrawn)	727	0.07%			
Total:	1,075,231	100.00%	74		74

== Polling ==
Source of poll aggregation	Dates administered	Dates updated	Nikki Haley	Donald Trump	Other/ Undecided (Note: Calculated by taking the difference of 100% and all other candidates combined.)	Margin
270ToWin	February 5–7, 2024	February 15, 2024	21.5%	74.5%	4.0%	Trump +53.0
FiveThirtyEight	through February 4, 2024	February 15, 2024	22.1%	74.7%	4.2%	Trump +52.6

Poll source	Date(s) administered	Sample size (Note: Key: A – all adults RV – registered voters LV – likely voters V – unclear)	Margin of error	Chris Christie	Ron DeSantis	Nikki Haley	Asa Hutchinson	Mike Pence	Vivek Ramaswamy	Tim Scott	Donald Trump	Other	Undecided
Capen Analytics	Feb 21, 2024	12,580 (LV)	± 5.0%	–	–	36%	–	–	–	–	64%	–	–
Public Policy Polling (D)	Jan 5–6, 2024	619 (LV)	± 3.9%	3%	9%	12%	0%	–	4%	–	66%	0% (Note: Ryan Binkley with 0%)	5%
ECU Center for Survey Research	Nov 29 – Dec 1, 2023	445 (LV)	± 5.4%	2%	10%	13%	1%	–	3%	–	63%	–	8%
Morning Consult	Nov 1–30, 2023	1,342 (LV)	–	4%	14%	9%	1%	–	5%	1%	67%	0% (Note: Doug Burgum with 0%)	–
Meredith College	Nov 1–5, 2023	335 (LV)	± 3.5%	6%	14%	9%	0%	-	8%	3%	51%	2% (Note: "Someone else" with 2%; Ryan Binkley, Doug Burgum, Corey Stapleton with 0%)	6%
Morning Consult	Oct 1–31, 2023	1,337 (LV)	–	3%	14%	8%	0%	4%	6%	2%	61%	0% (Note: Doug Burgum and Will Hurd with 0%)	2%
Morning Consult	Sep 1–30, 2023	1,366 (LV)	–	3%	15%	8%	0%	5%	7%	2%	58%	0% (Note: Doug Burgum and Will Hurd with 0%)	2%
Meredith College	Sep 16–19, 2023	350 (RV)	± 3.5%	3%	13%	6%	0%	5%	8%	3%	51%	6% (Note: Ryan Binkley, Doug Burgum, Larry Elder, Will Hurd, Perry Johnson & "Someone else" with 1%; Corey Stapleton with 0%)	7%
Morning Consult	Aug 1–31, 2023	1,491 (LV)	–	3%	15%	6%	1%	5%	10%	2%	57%	0% (Note: Doug Burgum, Will Hurd, and Francis Suarez with 0%)	1%
Morning Consult	July 1–31, 2023	1,535 (LV)	–	3%	15%	5%	0%	6%	9%	3%	58%	0% (Note: Doug Burgum, Will Hurd and Francis Suarez with 0%)	1%
Morning Consult	June 1–30, 2023	1,454 (LV)	–	2%	20%	5%	1%	7%	4%	3%	56%	1% (Note: Liz Cheney with 1%; Greg Abbott, Doug Burgum, Will Hurd, Kristi Noem, and Francis Suarez with 0%)	1%
Opinion Diagnostics	Jun 5–7, 2023	408 (LV)	± 4.8%	2%	22%	7%	1%	6%	1%	4%	44%	2% (Note: "Someone Else" with 2%)	11%
Opinion Diagnostics	Jun 5–7, 2023	408 (LV)	± 4.8%	–	34%	–	–	–	–	–	50%	–	15%
Morning Consult	May 1–31, 2023	1,453 (LV)	–	–	20%	6%	1%	6%	3%	2%	59%	3% (Note: Liz Cheney with 2%; Greg Abbott with 1%; Kristi Noem and Glenn Youngkin with 0%)	1%
Morning Consult	Apr 1–30, 2023	1,299 (LV)	–	–	23%	6%	0%	5%	1%	1%	58%	4% (Note: Liz Cheney with 2%; Kristi Noem and Mike Pompeo with 1%; Greg Abbott and Glenn Youngkin with 0%)	2%
SurveyUSA (Note: Poll conducted for the John Locke Foundation)	Apr 25–29, 2023	707 (LV)	± 4.4%	–	22%	5%	1%	8%	2%	1%	55%	0% (Note: Chris Sununu with 0%)	5%
Morning Consult	Mar 1–31, 2023	1,31 (LV)	–	–	27%	9%	–	8%	0%	1%	51%	2% (Note: Liz Cheney with 2%; Greg Abbott, Kristi Noem, Mike Pompeo and Glenn Youngkin with 0%)	2%
Morning Consult	Feb 1–28, 2023	1,185 (LV)	–	–	31%	7%	–	6%	–	1%	51%	3% (Note: Liz Cheney with 2%; Ted Cruz with 1%; Greg Abbott, Kristi Noem, Mike Pompeo and Glenn Youngkin with 0%)	1%
Morning Consult	Jan 1–31, 2023	1,703 (LV)	–	–	30%	4%	–	7%	–	1%	52%	5% (Note: Liz Cheney and Ted Cruz with 2%; Mike Pompeo with 1%; Greg Abbott, Kristi Noem, and Glenn Youngkin with 0%)	1%
Differentiators Data	Jan 9–12, 2023	213 (LV)	± 4.5%	–	47%	4%	–	2%	–	–	35%	3% (Note: Mike Pompeo with 2%)	–
Morning Consult	Dec 1–31, 2022	905 (LV)	–	–	31%	4%	–	7%	–	1%	50%	5% (Note: Liz Cheney with 3%; Ted Cruz with 2%; Greg Abbott, Kristi Noem, Mike Pompeo, and Glenn Youngkin with 0%)	2%
Differentiators Data	Dec 8–11, 2022	500 (LV)	± 4.5%	–	56%	–	–	–	–	–	35%	–	–
John Bolton Super PAC	Jul 22–24, 2022	149 (LV)	–	1%	27%	–	–	6%	–	–	37%	12% (Note: Marco Rubio with 5%; Ted Cruz and Liz Cheney with 3%; Mike Pompeo with 1%)	16%
Atlantic Polling Strategies (Note: Poll conducted for the North Carolina Chamber of Commerce)	Apr 25–28, 2022	534 (LV)	± 4.9%	–	23%	5%	–	4%	–	4%	52%	2% (Note: Ted Cruz with 2%)	10%
Spry Strategies	Apr 6–10, 2022	600 (LV)	± 4.0%	–	19%	8%	–	6%	–	1%	45%	9% (Note: Ted Cruz with 6%; Mike Pompeo with 2%; Kristi Noem with 1%)	12%
Spry Strategies	Apr 6–10, 2022	600 (LV)	± 4.0%	–	32%	8%	–	9%	–	2%	–	18% (Note: Ted Cruz with 11%; Mike Pompeo with 5%; Kristi Noem with 2%)	31%
Cygnal (R)	Apr 1–3, 2022	600 (LV)	± 4.0%	–	26%	8%	–	6%	–	–	45%	2% (Note: Ted Cruz with 2%)	13%
Cygnal (R)	Jan 7–9, 2022	600 (LV)	± 4.0%	–	19%	8%	–	5%	–	2%	47%	3% (Note: Ted Cruz with 2%; Kristi Noem with 1%)	16%
	Jan 20, 2021	Inauguration of Joe Biden											
BUSR/UNLV Lee Business School	Nov 30 – Dec 2, 2020	221 (RV)	± 7.0%	–	–	6%	–	–	–	–	76%	13% (Note: Ted Cruz and Mitt Romney with 3%; Marco Rubio with 2%; "Someone else" with 5%)	6%
BUSR/UNLV Lee Business School	Nov 30 – Dec 2, 2020	221 (RV)	± 7.0%	–	–	9%	–	48%	–	–	–	25% (Note: Ted Cruz and Mitt Romney with 9%; Marco Rubio with 3%; "Someone else" with 4%)	18%

== See also ==
- 2024 Republican Party presidential primaries
- 2024 North Carolina Democratic presidential primary
- 2024 North Carolina elections
- 2024 United States presidential election
- 2024 United States presidential election in North Carolina
- 2024 United States elections

== Notes ==
Partisan clients
