= 2024 Colorado Democratic presidential primary =

- March 5, 2024

87 delegates (72 pledged, 15 unpledged) to the Democratic National Convention

Candidate	Joe Biden	Noncommitted Delegate
Home state	Delaware	–
Delegate count	72	0
Popular vote	477,365	52,122
Percentage	82.5%	9.0%
County results
Biden
50 – 60%
60 – 70%
70 – 80%
80 – 90%
>90%

The 2024 Colorado Democratic presidential primary took place on March 5, 2024, as part of the Democratic Party primaries for the 2024 presidential election. 72 delegates to the Democratic National Convention were allocated, with 15 additional unpledged delegates. The semi-closed primary was held on Super Tuesday alongside primaries in 14 other states and territories.

Incumbent president Joe Biden won the primary with 82.5%, receiving all 72 delegates, but significantly reduced from different primaries before and on the day, as the campaign for "noncommitted delegates" inspired by the Uncommitted National Movement won about 9% of the vote, and Dean Phillips and Marianne Williamson were also on the ballot.

== Candidates ==
The following candidates filed at the office of Secretary of State of Colorado:

- Joe Biden
- Gabriel Cornejo
- Frankie Lozada
- Stephen P. Lyons
- Jason Palmer
- Armando “Mando” Perez-Serrato
- Dean Phillips
- Marianne Williamson

The state Democratic Party also opted to submit a request for a "noncommitted delegate" voting option to the Secretary of State.

== Endorsements ==
Joe Biden

U.S. Senators

- Michael Bennet, U.S. Senator from Colorado (2009–present), Superintendent of Denver Public Schools (2005–2009)
- John Hickenlooper, U.S. Senator from Colorado (2021–present), 42nd Governor of Colorado (2011–2019), 43rd Mayor of Denver (2003–2011)

U.S. Representatives

- Diana DeGette, U.S. Representative from CO-01 (1997–present)
- Joe Neguse, U.S. Representative from CO-02 (2019–present)
- Ed Perlmutter, U.S. Representative from CO-07 (2007–2023)
- Brittany Pettersen, U.S. Representative from CO-07 (2023–present)

Organizations

- Colorado Democratic Party
Noncommitted delegate

U.S. Representatives

- David Skaggs, former U.S. Representative from CO-02 (1987–1999)

Organizations

- National organization and Colorado chapters of the Democratic Socialists of America
- Jewish Voice for Peace Action
- Colorado Palestine Coalition
- Denver Chapter of Local Berniecrats

== Results ==
2024 Colorado Democratic pres. primary
Candidate	Votes	%	Delegates
Joe Biden (incumbent)	477,365	82.45	72
Dean Phillips	17,936	3.10	0
Marianne Williamson	16,761	2.90	0
Gabriel Cornejo	4,313	0.74	0
Jason Palmer	3,986	0.69	0
Armando Perez-Serrato	2,591	0.45	0
Frankie Lozada	2,402	0.41	0
Stephen Lyons	1,481	0.26	0
Noncommitted Delegate	52,122	9.00	0
Total	578,957	100%	72

=== Results by county ===
2024 Colorado Democratic primary (results per county)
County	Joe Biden		Noncommitted Delegate		Dean Phillips		Marianne Williamson		Gabriel Cornejo		Jason Palmer		Armando Perez-Serrato		Frankie Lozada		Stephen Lyons		Total votes cast
County	Votes	%	Votes	%	Votes	%	Votes	%	Votes	%	Votes	%	Votes	%	Votes	%	Votes	%	Total votes cast
Adams	29,725	79.03%	3,626	9.64%	1,255	3.34%	1,336	3.55%	490	1.30%	431	1.15%	326	0.87%	254	0.68%	168	0.45%	37,611
Alamosa	1,074	80.75%	110	8.27%	32	2.41%	47	3.53%	10	0.75%	15	1.13%	26	1.95%	11	0.83%	5	0.38%	1,330
Arapahoe	51,523	83.00%	5,466	8.81%	1,837	2.96%	1,573	2.53%	503	0.81%	454	0.73%	247	0.40%	280	0.45%	193	0.31%	62,076
Archuleta	1,266	86.65%	88	6.02%	41	2.81%	44	3.01%	2	0.14%	7	0.48%	5	0.34%	2	0.14%	6	0.41%	1,461
Baca	99	64.71%	27	17.65%	8	5.23%	10	6.54%	0	0.00%	5	3.27%	1	0.65%	2	1.31%	1	0.65%	153
Bent	227	74.92%	45	14.85%	7	2.31%	7	2.31%	1	0.33%	2	0.66%	6	1.98%	3	0.99%	5	1.65%	303
Boulder	48,565	83.71%	5,315	9.16%	1,608	2.77%	1,613	2.78%	325	0.56%	223	0.38%	140	0.24%	159	0.27%	71	0.12%	58,019
Broomfield	8,440	83.75%	853	8.46%	317	3.15%	281	2.79%	58	0.58%	57	0.57%	19	0.19%	29	0.29%	24	0.24%	10,078
Chaffee	2,540	83.01%	272	8.89%	93	3.04%	106	3.46%	19	0.62%	11	0.36%	11	0.36%	4	0.13%	4	0.13%	3,060
Cheyenne	35	58.33%	14	23.33%	4	6.67%	1	1.67%	1	1.67%	2	3.33%	0	0.00%	3	5.00%	0	0.00%	60
Clear Creek	1,041	81.90%	101	7.95%	38	2.99%	60	4.72%	5	0.39%	11	0.87%	6	0.47%	7	0.55%	2	0.16%	1,271
Conejos	749	80.28%	60	6.43%	20	2.14%	25	2.68%	13	1.39%	15	1.61%	40	4.29%	8	0.86%	3	0.32%	933
Costilla	490	79.16%	69	11.15%	6	0.97%	12	1.94%	7	1.13%	7	1.13%	15	2.42%	6	0.97%	7	1.13%	619
Crowley	161	80.90%	12	6.03%	8	4.02%	11	5.53%	3	1.51%	0	0.00%	1	0.50%	2	1.01%	1	0.50%	199
Custer	433	90.21%	20	4.17%	7	1.46%	15	3.13%	1	0.21%	3	0.63%	0	0.00%	1	0.21%	0	0.00%	480
Delta	1,994	81.62%	201	8.23%	58	2.37%	107	4.38%	16	0.65%	38	1.56%	9	0.37%	7	0.29%	13	0.53%	2,443
Denver	74,724	80.89%	10,403	11.26%	2,648	2.62%	2,419	2.62%	673	0.73%	588	0.64%	423	0.46%	369	0.40%	133	0.14%	92,380
Dolores	82	75.23%	8	7.34%	3	2.75%	5	4.59%	1	0.92%	4	3.67%	0	0.00%	1	0.92%	5	4.59%	109
Douglas	27,301	84.57%	2,315	7.17%	1,229	3.81%	805	2.49%	186	0.58%	186	0.58%	93	0.29%	105	0.33%	62	0.19%	32,282
Eagle	3,916	85.04%	316	6.86%	164	3.56%	123	2.67%	23	0.50%	24	0.52%	23	0.50%	13	0.28%	3	0.07%	4,605
El Paso	42,314	82.63%	3,993	7.80%	1,730	3.38%	1,673	3.27%	507	0.99%	339	0.66%	223	0.44%	274	0.54%	153	0.30%	51,206
Elbert	1,302	81.99%	123	7.75%	54	3.40%	56	3.53%	9	0.57%	18	1.13%	8	0.50%	6	0.38%	12	0.76%	1,588
Fremont	2,671	83.94%	242	7.61%	88	2.77%	98	3.08%	18	0.57%	21	0.66%	19	0.60%	9	0.28%	16	0.50%	3,182
Garfield	4,032	83.03%	422	8.69%	137	2.82%	154	3.17%	31	0.64%	39	0.80%	14	0.29%	17	0.35%	10	0.21%	4,856
Gilpin	669	80.80%	81	9.78%	23	2.78%	36	4.35%	4	0.48%	6	0.72%	3	0.36%	4	0.48%	2	0.24%	828
Grand	1,251	83.79%	110	7.37%	54	3.62%	48	3.22%	8	0.54%	9	0.60%	3	0.20%	6	0.40%	4	0.27%	1,493
Gunnison	1,664	82.54%	194	9.62%	65	3.22%	49	2.43%	14	0.69%	11	0.55%	10	0.69%	7	0.35%	2	0.10%	2,016
Hinsdale	57	86.36%	3	4.55%	2	3.03%	2	3.03%	1	1.52%	1	1.52%	0	0.00%	0	0.00%	0	0.00%	66
Huerfano	859	82.44%	83	7.97%	25	2.40%	24	2.30%	11	1.06%	11	1.06%	19	1.82%	3	0.29%	7	0.67%	1,042
Jackson	38	92.68%	0	0.00%	2	4.88%	1	2.44%	0	0.00%	0	0.00%	0	0.00%	0	0.00%	0	0.00%	41
Jefferson	62,174	82.52%	6,902	9.16%	2,470	3.28%	2,160	2.87%	452	0.60%	502	0.67%	224	0.30%	288	0.38%	173	0.23%	75,345
Kiowa	26	65.00%	9	22.50%	2	5.00%	1	2.50%	0	0.00%	0	0.00%	2	5.00%	0	0.00%	0	0.00%	40
Kit Carson	161	71.24%	40	17.70%	8	3.54%	10	4.42%	1	0.44%	2	0.88%	2	0.88%	1	0.44%	1	0.44%	226
La Plata	6,080	84.05%	612	8.46%	194	2.68%	218	3.01%	28	0.39%	45	0.62%	21	0.29%	20	0.28%	16	0.22%	7,234
Lake	577	79.26%	77	10.58%	21	2.88%	25	3.43%	9	1.24%	8	1.10%	6	0.82%	4	0.55%	1	0.14%	728
Larimer	36,046	83.28%	3,768	8.71%	1,252	2.89%	1,324	3.06%	309	0.71%	205	0.47%	122	0.28%	173	0.40%	85	0.20%	43,284
Las Animas	1,442	78.84%	223	12.19%	45	2.46%	50	2.73%	15	0.82%	10	0.55%	19	1.04%	14	0.77%	11	0.60%	1,829
Lincoln	120	71.01%	23	13.61%	6	3.55%	6	3.55%	1	0.59%	5	2.96%	3	1.78%	0	0.00%	5	2.96%	169
Logan	699	78.01%	99	11.05%	29	3.24%	26	2.90%	5	0.56%	22	2.46%	7	0.78%	2	0.22%	7	0.78%	896
Mesa	9,719	84.15%	807	6.99%	383	3.32%	339	2.94%	63	0.55%	107	0.93%	53	0.46%	42	0.36%	36	0.31%	11,549
Mineral	127	77.44%	13	7.93%	8	4.88%	10	6.10%	0	0.00%	4	2.44%	2	1.22%	0	0.00%	0	0.00%	164
Moffat	290	78.17%	32	8.63%	19	5.12%	15	4.04%	5	1.35%	3	0.81%	1	0.27%	3	0.81%	3	0.81%	371
Montezuma	1,898	84.69%	178	7.94%	58	2.59%	68	3.03%	8	0.36%	7	0.31%	5	0.22%	7	0.31%	12	0.54%	2,241
Montrose	2,658	86.41%	191	6.21%	84	2.73%	82	2.67%	9	0.29%	21	0.68%	10	0.33%	12	0.39%	9	0.29%	3,076
Morgan	844	73.01%	140	12.11%	44	3.81%	52	4.50%	14	1.21%	22	1.90%	24	2.08%	10	0.87%	6	0.52%	1,156
Otero	1,137	80.75%	103	7.32%	37	2.63%	40	2.84%	13	0.92%	29	2.06%	28	1.99%	16	1.14%	5	0.36%	1,408
Ouray	808	89.18%	41	4.53%	21	2.32%	26	2.87%	3	0.33%	3	0.33%	2	0.22%	0	0.00%	2	0.22%	906
Park	1,394	84.79%	116	7.06%	44	2.68%	53	3.22%	14	0.85%	12	0.73%	5	0.30%	3	0.18%	3	0.18%	1,644
Phillips	115	71.43%	18	11.18%	15	9.32%	6	3.73%	1	0.62%	3	1.86%	2	1.24%	0	0.00%	1	0.62%	161
Pitkin	2,085	87.31%	138	5.78%	74	3.10%	64	2.68%	7	0.29%	7	0.29%	7	0.29%	3	0.13%	3	0.13%	2,388
Prowers	372	74.70%	55	11.04%	23	4.62%	16	3.21%	4	0.80%	11	2.21%	7	1.41%	7	1.41%	3	0.60%	498
Pueblo	13,937	81.99%	1,473	8.67%	453	2.67%	505	2.97%	138	0.81%	177	1.04%	183	1.08%	75	0.44%	57	0.34%	16,998
Rio Blanco	150	81.52%	11	5.98%	9	4.89%	9	4.89%	2	1.09%	2	1.09%	0	0.00%	0	0.00%	1	0.54%	184
Rio Grande	754	81.25%	73	7.87%	19	2.05%	36	3.88%	10	1.08%	4	0.43%	14	1.51%	9	0.97%	9	0.97%	928
Routt	2,588	86.64%	196	6.56%	109	3.65%	62	2.08%	5	0.17%	15	0.50%	5	0.17%	3	0.10%	4	0.13%	2,987
Saguache	624	79.29%	80	10.17%	28	3.56%	35	4.45%	7	0.89%	4	0.51%	5	0.64%	1	0.13%	3	0.38%	787
San Juan	91	81.25%	6	5.36%	2	1.79%	8	7.14%	3	2.68%	1	0.89%	0	0.00%	0	0.00%	1	0.89%	112
San Miguel	923	85.78%	86	7.99%	33	3.07%	23	2.14%	3	0.28%	4	0.37%	3	0.28%	1	0.09%	0	0.00%	1,076
Sedgwick	110	83.97%	14	10.69%	2	1.53%	4	3.05%	0	0.00%	1	0.76%	0	0.00%	0	0.00%	0	0.00%	131
Summit	2,649	84.42%	255	8.13%	121	3.86%	59	1.88%	20	0.64%	12	0.38%	7	0.22%	6	0.19%	9	0.29%	3,138
Teller	1,640	84.80%	142	7.34%	54	2.79%	60	3.10%	8	0.41%	15	0.78%	5	0.26%	4	0.21%	6	0.31%	1,934
Washington	95	77.24%	7	5.69%	4	3.25%	10	8.13%	0	0.00%	3	2.44%	2	1.63%	1	0.81%	1	0.81%	123
Weld	15,568	81.38%	1,578	8.25%	688	3.60%	598	3.13%	210	1.10%	170	0.89%	122	0.64%	105	0.55%	92	0.48%	19,131
Yuma	222	68.31%	44	13.54%	14	4.31%	20	6.15%	6	1.85%	12	3.69%	3	0.92%	0	0.00%	4	1.23%	325
Total	477,365	82.45%	52,122	9.00%	17,936	3.10%	16,761	2.90%	4,313	0.74%	3,986	0.69%	2,591	0.45%	2,402	0.41%	1,481	0.26%	578,957

== See also ==
- 2024 Colorado Republican presidential primary
- 2024 Democratic Party presidential primaries
- 2024 United States presidential election
- 2024 United States presidential election in Colorado
- 2024 United States elections
