= 2024 Maryland Democratic presidential primary =

- May 14, 2024

118 delegates (95 pledged, 23 unpledged) to the Democratic National Convention

Candidate	Joe Biden	Uncommitted
Home state	Delaware	–
Delegate count	95	0
Popular vote	591,523	66,168
Percentage	87.1%	9.7%
County results
Biden:
70 – 80%
80 – 90%
>90%

The 2024 Maryland Democratic presidential primary took place on May 14, 2024, as part of the Democratic Party primaries for the 2024 presidential election, alongside two other state contests. 95 delegates to the Democratic National Convention were allocated, with 23 additional unpledged delegates.

Incumbent President Joe Biden announced his bid for a second term on April 25, 2023. Biden easily won the primary. While the option for uncommitted delegates, strengthened by the Uncommitted National Movement, received nearly 10% of the vote, it was not enough to win any delegates.

== Candidates ==
Dean Phillips, who suspended his primary campaign on March 6, 2024, and Marianne Williamson were the only other candidates on the ballot:

- Joe Biden
- Dean Phillips (withdrawn)
- Marianne Williamson

The ballot also included an option for Uncommitted.

== Endorsements ==
Joe Biden

State officials

- Wes Moore, (Note: Biden-Harris Campaign National Advisory Board member) Governor of Maryland (2023–present)

U.S. representatives

- Jamie Raskin, MD-08 (2017–present)

Newspapers

- Baltimore Afro-American
Uncommitted

State legislators

- Gabriel Acevero, state delegate from HD-39 (2019–present)

Organizations

- Democratic Socialists of America
- Our Revolution Maryland

== Results ==
Maryland Democratic primary, May 14, 2024
Candidate	Votes	%	Delegates
Joe Biden (incumbent)	591,523	87.14	95
Marianne Williamson	12,935	1.91	0
Dean Phillips (withdrawn)	8,188	1.21	0
Uncommitted	66,168	9.75	0
Total	678,814	100%	95

== Polling ==
Poll source	Date(s) administered	Sample size (Note: Key: A – all adults RV – registered voters LV – likely voters V – unclear)	Margin of error	Joe Biden	Dean Phillips	Marianne Williamson	Uncommitted	Undecided
OpinionWorks	April 7–10, 2024	600 (LV)	± 4.0%	73%	3%	3%	12%	9%

Hypothetical polling

Poll source	Date(s) administered	Sample size	Margin of error	Joe Biden	Wes Moore	Other	Undecided
Gonzales Research	May 30 – June 6, 2023	620 (RV)	± 3.5%	49%	41%	–	10%

== See also ==
- 2024 Maryland Republican presidential primary
- 2024 Democratic Party presidential primaries
- 2024 United States presidential election
- 2024 United States presidential election in Maryland
- 2024 United States elections
