= 2024 Wisconsin Democratic presidential primary =

- April 2, 2024

95 delegates (82 pledged, 13 automatic) to the Democratic National Convention

| Candidate | Joe Biden | Uninstructed delegates |
| Home state | Delaware | – |
| Estimated delegate count | 82 | 0 |
| Popular vote | 512,379 | 48,373 |
| Percentage | 88.0% | 8.3% |
County results
Biden
80–90%
>90%

The 2024 Wisconsin Democratic presidential primary was held on April 2, 2024, as part of the Democratic Party primaries for the 2024 presidential election, alongside three other contests on the day. 82 delegates to the Democratic National Convention were allocated, with 13 additional unpledged delegates.

President Joe Biden won almost 90% of the vote and was virtually unopposed, with Dean Phillips and the campaign for uninstructed delegates being his only challengers. The Uncommitted National Movement, fueled by protest votes due to the Gaza war, received over 8% of the vote but won no delegates.

== Candidates ==
The following candidates filed:

- Joe Biden
- Dean Phillips (withdrawn)

Phillips was included on the ballot following a lawsuit, which challenged his exclusion by the state's Presidential Preference Selection Committee. Also on the ballot was the option to vote for uninstructed delegates or a write-in candidate.

== Endorsements ==
Joe Biden

U.S. representatives

- Ron Kind, U.S. former representative from WI-03 (1997–2023)

Statewide officials

- Tony Evers, Governor of Wisconsin (2019–present); Superintendent of Public Instruction (2009–2019)
- Sarah Godlewski, Secretary of State of Wisconsin (2023–present), State Treasurer of Wisconsin (2019–2023)
- Sara Rodriguez, Lieutenant Governor of Wisconsin (2023–present)
- Josh Kaul, Attorney General of Wisconsin (2019–present)

Local officials

- Satya Rhodes-Conway, 58th mayor of Madison, Wisconsin (2019–present)

Individuals

- Ben Wikler, Chair of the Wisconsin Democratic Party (2019–present)
Uninstructed delegation

State legislators

- Chris Larson, Wisconsin State Senate 7th district (2011–present)
- Ryan Clancy, Wisconsin State Assembly 19th district (2023–present) and Milwaukee County Board of Supervisors (2020–present)
- Francesca Hong, Wisconsin State Assembly 76th district (2021–present)
- Darrin Madison, Wisconsin State Assembly 10th district (2023-present)
- Kristina Shelton, Wisconsin State Assembly 90th district (2021-present)

Organizations

- Jewish Voice for Peace Action
- National organization and Madison chapter of the Democratic Socialists of America
- Our Revolution
- Sunrise Movement
- US Campaign for Palestinian Rights Action

== Results ==
Incumbent President Joe Biden won the primary in a landslide. His only competitor, Dean Phillips, withdrew on March 6, 2024, but was still on the ballot. Voters could also choose uninstructed delegates.

Wisconsin Democratic primary, April 2, 2024
| Candidate | Votes | % | Delegates |
|---|---|---|---|
| Joe Biden (incumbent) | 512,379 | 87.96 | 82 |
| Dean Phillips (withdrawn) | 17,730 | 3.04 | 0 |
| Uninstructed Delegation | 48,373 | 8.30 | 0 |
| Write-in votes (as Scattering) | 4,045 | 0.69 | — |
| Total | 582,527 | 100% | 82 |

== Polling ==
Hypothetical polling

| Source | Date | Sample | Joe Biden | Marianne Williamson | Other |
|---|---|---|---|---|---|
| Marquette Law School | June 28, 2023 | 453 RV ±6% | 49% | 3% | 48% |

== See also ==
- 2024 Wisconsin Republican presidential primary
- 2024 United States presidential election in Wisconsin
- 2024 Democratic Party presidential primaries
- 2024 United States presidential election
