= 2024 North Carolina Democratic presidential primary =

- March 5, 2024

134 delegates (116 pledged, 18 unpledged) to the Democratic National Convention

Candidate	Joe Biden	No Preference
Home state	Delaware	–
Delegate count	116	0
Popular vote	609,680	88,900
Percentage	87.3%	12.7%
County results
Biden
60 – 70%
70 – 80%
80 – 90%
>90%

The 2024 North Carolina Democratic presidential primary took place on March 5, 2024, as part of the Democratic Party primaries for the 2024 presidential election. 116 delegates to the Democratic National Convention were allocated, with 18 additional unpledged delegates. The contest was held on Super Tuesday alongside primaries in 14 other states and territories.

Joe Biden won the North Carolina primary and received all 116 delegates, as the only other option for "no preference" delegates achieved a substantial number of votes, but closely missed out on a district delegate in the 8th congressional district.

== Candidates ==
The following was the only candidate on the ballot:

- Joe Biden

In North Carolina, candidates can make the primary ballot either by being nominated by the state party or by filing a nominating petition with at least 10,000 signatures. North Carolina Democratic Party chair Anderson Clayton submitted only Joe Biden as a candidate to the state Board of Elections, and no candidate submitted 10,000 signatures by the December 22, 2023, deadline.

The cancellation was criticized by the Dean Phillips campaign, who started an online petition to get his candidacy on the ballot and threatened legal challenges. Marianne Williamson and Cenk Uygur also criticized the moves. Opponents of Phillips' communication countered that his late primary entrance had failed to meet the required timeframe and that he had not declared his candidacy to every state party.

In North Carolina, a ballot option named "no preference" appeared on the Democratic, Republican, and Libertarian presidential primary ballots. In 2012, when President Barack Obama had not faced primary opposition in North Carolina, approximately twenty percent of voters opted for that option.

== Endorsements ==
Joe Biden

U.S. Representatives

- Alma Adams, U.S. Representative from NC-12 (2014–present)
- Valerie Foushee, U.S. Representative from NC-04 (2023–present)
- Deborah Ross, U.S. Representative from NC-02 (2021–present)

Statewide officials

- Roy Cooper, 75th Governor of North Carolina (2017–present), 49th North Carolina Attorney General (2001–2017)

Mayors

- Vi Lyles, 59th Mayor of Charlotte (2017–present)
No Preference

Organizations

- National organization and Charlotte Metro, and NC Triangle, and Wilmington chapters of the Democratic Socialists of America
- Jewish Voice for Peace Action

== Results ==
2024 North Carolina Democratic pres. primary
Candidate	Votes	%	Delegates
Joe Biden (incumbent)	609,680	87.27	116
No Preference	88,900	12.73	0
Total	698,580	100%	116

== See also ==
- 2024 North Carolina Republican presidential primary
- 2024 North Carolina Libertarian presidential primary
- 2024 North Carolina elections
- 2024 Democratic Party presidential primaries
- 2024 United States presidential election
- 2024 United States presidential election in North Carolina
- 2024 United States elections
