= 2024 Alabama Democratic presidential primary =

- March 5, 2024

58 delegates (52 pledged, 6 unpledged) to the Democratic National Convention

Candidate	Joe Biden	Uncommitted
Home state	Delaware	–
Delegate count	52	0
Popular vote	168,080	11,283
Percentage	89.5%	6.0%

Biden
40–50%
50–60%
60–70%
70–80%
80–90%
90–100%
Uncommitted
40–50%
50–60%
60–70%
70–80%
90–100%
Phillips
40–50%
50–60%
60–70%
90–100%
Other
30–40% tie
40–50% tie
50% tie
No votes

The 2024 Alabama Democratic presidential primary took place on March 5, 2024, as part of the Democratic Party primaries for the 2024 presidential election. 52 delegates to the Democratic National Convention were allocated, with 6 additional unpledged delegates. The open primary was held on Super Tuesday alongside primaries in 14 other states and territories and its Republican counterpart.

Incumbent president Joe Biden won the primary with nearly 90% and received all 52 delegates, while an option for assigning uncommitted delegates placed ahead of his only other ballot challenger, US representative Dean Phillips.

== Candidates ==
The following candidates have been certified to appear on the ballot in Alabama.

- Joe Biden
- Dean Phillips

The ballot included an option for uncommitted delegates, supported by the 2024 Uncommitted National Movement.

== Endorsements ==
Uncommitted

Organizations

- National organization and Birmingham and North Alabama chapters of the Democratic Socialists of America

== Results ==
2024 Alabama Democratic primary
Candidate	Votes	%	Delegates
Joe Biden (incumbent)	168,080	89.50	52
Dean Phillips	8,442	4.50	0
Uncommitted	11,283	6.01	0
Total	187,805	100%	52

== See also ==
- 2024 Alabama Republican presidential primary
- 2024 Democratic Party presidential primaries
- 2024 United States presidential election
- 2024 United States presidential election in Alabama
- 2024 United States elections
