= 2024 New Jersey Democratic presidential primary =

- June 4, 2024

145 delegates (126 pledged, 19 unpledged) to the Democratic National Convention

Candidate	Joe Biden	Uncommitted
Home state	Delaware	–
Delegate count	124	2
Popular vote	458,281	46,988
Percentage	88.0%	9.0%

The 2024 New Jersey Democratic presidential primary took place on June 4, 2024, one of the last states among four other primaries, as part of the Democratic Party primaries for the 2024 presidential election. 126 delegates to the Democratic National Convention were allocated in a semi-closed primary, with 19 additional unpledged delegates.

Incumbent President Joe Biden, who had already won most delegates, won the primary, missing the last two delegates to the "uncommitted" option, which received two district delegates. The only other candidate, anti-abortion activist Terrisa Bukovinac came below 3%.

== Candidates ==
The New Jersey Secretary of State identified the following candidates as Democratic Party primary candidates in 2024:

- Joe Biden
- Terrisa Bukovinac

The ballot included an option for Uncommitted.

=== Uncommitted vote ===
On March 25, 2024, a coalition of delegates filed nominating petitions under the slogan "Justice for Palestine, Permanent Ceasefire Now". The organizing effort, spearheaded by the Democratic Socialists of America, was part of a national movement inspired by the Listen to Michigan campaign that won over 100,000 votes in a protest of President Joe Biden's policy in the Gaza war.

== Results ==
New Jersey Democratic primary, June 4, 2024
Candidate	Votes	%	Delegates
Joe Biden (incumbent)	458,281	88.01	124
Uncommitted	46,988	9.02	2
Terrisa Bukovinac	14,179	2.72	0
Write-in votes	(Note: The exact final amount was not published.)1,269	0.24	—
Total	520,717	100%	126

== See also ==
- 2024 New Jersey Republican presidential primary
- 2024 Democratic Party presidential primaries
- 2024 United States presidential election
- 2024 United States presidential election in New Jersey
- 2024 United States elections
