= 2024 Michigan Democratic presidential primary =

- February 27, 2024

138 delegates (117 pledged, 21 unpledged) to the Democratic National Convention

Candidate	Joe Biden	Uncommitted
Home state	Delaware	–
Delegate count	115	2
Popular vote	625,221	101,623
Percentage	81.1%	13.2%
- Biden 70–80% 80–90%

The 2024 Michigan Democratic presidential primary was held on February 27, 2024, as part of the Democratic Party primaries for the 2024 presidential election. 117 delegates to the Democratic National Convention were allocated in an open primary, with 21 additional unpledged delegates. The primary was pushed ahead into the early window of first states for the first time due to its diversity and relevance as a swing state on the recommendation of President Joe Biden. The Republican caucus was held four days later.

Despite Biden winning in a landslide, he faced an organised challenge for "uncommitted" delegates in an otherwise generally uncontested primary season, losing to it two of the 117 delegates. It was the first "campaign" to win delegates other than Biden's that primary season, and won over 100,000 votes. The campaign's performance was attributed to Arab, Muslim, young and progressive voters protesting Biden over his handling of the Gaza war. The uncommitted vote in Michigan inspired similar protest votes in other states, eventually becoming a national movement throughout the presidential election.

== Candidates ==
The Michigan Secretary of State identified the following candidates (listed alphabetically) as Democratic Party presidential candidates in 2024:

- Joe Biden
- Dean Phillips
- Marianne Williamson (withdrawn)

An Uncommitted option was also included on the ballot. Williamson suspended her campaign on February 8, following the Nevada primary. However, she was still listed on the ballot, and after finishing ahead of Phillips, she re-entered the race.

=== Campaign for "uncommitted" ===
The option for "uncommitted" delegates to the Democratic National Convention would essentially award an "unpledged" superdelegate free to support any candidate they chose. Numerous activists and elected officials, including Dearborn Mayor Abdullah Hammoud and House Representative Rashida Tlaib, campaigned for voters to select the uncommitted option in protest of Biden's handling of the Gaza war. Some Armenian Americans also suggested voting uncommitted over Biden's actions involving the 2023 Azerbaijani offensive in Nagorno-Karabakh.

In response, the advocacy group Democratic Majority for Israel ran ads arguing that voting "uncommitted" would weaken Biden and support Donald Trump. Michigan governor Gretchen Whitmer stated that although she acknowledged the "pain" people feel about the war, she still encouraged people to vote for Biden because "any vote that's not cast for Joe Biden supports a second Trump term".

== Endorsements ==
Joe Biden

Cabinet-level officials

- Pete Buttigieg, 19th U.S. Secretary of Transportation (2021–2025), 32nd Mayor of South Bend, Indiana (2012–2020), candidate for president in 2020

U.S. Senator

- Gary Peters, U.S. Senator from Michigan (2015–present), U.S. Representative for MI-14 (2013–15) and MI-09 (2009–13)

U.S. Representatives

- Dan Kildee, U.S. Representative from MI-08 (2013–2025)

Statewide officials

- Gretchen Whitmer, 49th Governor of Michigan (2019–present), Vice Chair of the Democratic National Committee (2021–2025)
- Garlin Gilchrist, 64th Lieutenant Governor of Michigan (2019–present)

Mayors

- Mike Duggan, 75th Mayor of Detroit (2014–2026)
Dean Phillips

Newspapers

- The Detroit News (co-endorsement with Nikki Haley)
Uncommitted

U.S. Representatives

- Andy Levin, former U.S. Representative from MI-09 (2019–2023)
- Rashida Tlaib, U.S. Representative from MI-12 (2023−present), MI-13 (2019–2023)
- Beto O'Rourke, former U.S. Representative from TX-16 (2013–2019), candidate for president in 2020

State legislators

- Abraham Aiyash, State Representative from HD-04 (2020–present) and Majority Floor Leader (2023–present)
- Erin Byrnes, State Representative from HD-15 (2023–present)
- Jaime Churches, State Representative from HD-27 (2023–present)
- Emily Dievendorf, State Representative from HD-77 (2023–present)
- Alabas Farhat, State Representative from HD-03 (2023–present)
- Gabriela Santiago-Romero, Detroit City councilmember from District 6 (2022–present)
- Karen Whitsett, State Representative from HD-04 (2018–present)
- Dylan Wegela, State Representative from HD-26 (2023–present)
- Mary D. Waters, at-large Detroit City councilmember (2022–present), and former State Representative from HD-04 (2001–2006)

Mayors

- Abdullah Hammoud, Mayor of Dearborn (2022–present) and former State Representative from HD-15 (2017–2021)

Notable individuals

- Nasser Beydoun, former executive director of the Arab American Chamber of Commerce and candidate for U.S. Senate in 2024.
- Michael Moore, left-wing activist and film producer
- Linda Sarsour, political activist and co-chair of the 2017 Women's March

Newspapers

- Detroit Metro Times

Organizations

- Armenian National Committee of America
- Democratic Socialists of America
- IfNotNow
- Our Revolution
- Students for Justice in Palestine
Declined to endorse

State legislators

- Darrin Camilleri, State Senator from SD-04 (2023–present) and former State Representative from HD-23 (2017–2023)

== Polling ==
Poll source	Date(s) administered	Sample size (Note: Key: RV – registered voters LV – likely voters)	Margin of error	Joe Biden	Robert F. Kennedy Jr.	Dean Phillips	Marianne Williamson	Uncommitted	Undecided
Emerson College/The Hill	February 20–24, 2024	406 (LV)	–	74.5%	–	4.8%	–	8.8%	11.9%
	February 7, 2024	Williamson suspends her candidacy							
Monmouth University/The Washington Post	December 7–11, 2023	460 (LV)	–	79%	–	5%	9%	–	6%
	October 27, 2023	Phillips declares his candidacy							
	October 9, 2023	Kennedy withdraws from the primaries							
Emerson College	August 1–2, 2023	1,121 (RV)	± 2.9%	65%	11%	–	5%	–	17%
Mitchell Research (Note: Poll commissioned by MIRS)	July 11–13, 2023	639 (LV)	± 4.0%	75%	3%	–	4%	–	19%

== Results ==
2024 Michigan Democratic primary
Candidate	Votes	%	Delegates
Joe Biden (incumbent)	625,221	81.14	115
Uncommitted	101,623	13.19	2
Marianne Williamson (withdrawn)	22,865	2.97	0
Dean Phillips	20,684	2.68	0
Write-in votes	178	0.02	—
Total	770,571	100%	117

To win delegates, a candidate must receive over 15% of votes statewide or in any congressional district. "Uncommitted" votes accounted for 17.1% of the votes in the 6th district and 17.3% in the 12th district, winning a delegate each from both districts.

Results by precinct in Wayne County, home of Detroit, Dearborn, and Hamtramck Biden: 90–100%; 80-90%; 70–80%; 60–70%; 50–60%; 40–50%; Uncommitted: 40–50%; 50–60%; 60–70%; 70–80%; 80–90%; 90–100%

Popular vote share by precinct in Dearborn, Michigan Biden: 90–100%; 70–80%; 60–70%; 50–60%; 40–50%; Uncommitted: 50–60%; 60–70%; 70–80%; 80–90%; 90–100%

"Uncommitted" won a majority in Dearborn, as well as in the cities of Hamtramck and Dearborn Heights. All three cities have a significant Arab American and Muslim population, which has been seen as a cause of Biden's defeat. Biden performed well in the western part of the city, but suffered a defeat in more heavily Muslim East Dearborn. However, he recorded his strongest result in the 13th precinct in the eastern part of the city, where a retirement community is located.

== See also ==
- 2024 Michigan Republican presidential primary
- 2024 Democratic Party presidential primaries
- 2024 United States presidential election
- 2024 United States presidential election in Michigan
- 2024 United States elections

== Notes ==
Partisan clients
