= Black Muslim Leadership Council =

Nonprofit social justice organization in the US

Black Muslim Leadership Council (BMLC) is an American 501(c)(3) nonprofit organization dedicated to policy advocacy, voter turnout, civic education, and leadership development. It is focused largely on the needs of the Black American Muslim community.

== History ==
BMLC was founded in Philadelphia in 2024 by Salima Suswell, an American political activist and community mobilizer.

== Programs ==
BMLC's programs fall into four categories: Policy Advocacy; Voter Turnout; Civic Education; and Leadership Development.

In coordination with its 501(c)(4) wing, Black Muslim Leadership Council Fund, BMLC advocates for policies that address specific discrimination and oppression.

Areas of focus include economic equity, public safety and gun violence, mental health, Black maternal health, social and criminal justice, environmental justice, affordable housing, reparations, voting rights, and a ceasefire in Gaza, safe return of all hostages, and resumption of humanitarian aid.

BMLC voter turnout efforts include voter registration drives, door-knocking, phone banking, hosting get-out-the-vote events, and distributing resources about voting rights.

== Black Muslim Leadership Council Fund ==
Black Muslim Leadership Council Fund (BMLC Fund) is the advocacy wing of the BMLC. It is an American 501(c)(4) organization that advocates for urban communities on issue areas including social and criminal justice, environmental justice, affordable housing, and economic equity. It also endorses candidates that support the Black American Muslim community.

BMLC Fund was founded in 2024 by Salima Suswell, an American political activist and community mobilizer.

BMLC Fund maintains a Policy Agenda, which details policy efforts that support the unification and empowerment of the Black American Muslim community, as well as a Foreign Policy Agenda, which details BMLC Fund's commitment to the inherent dignity of all people and affirms global equal and inalienable rights.

=== Endorsements ===
BMLC Fund endorses candidates who uphold the values of the Black American Muslim community, which includes standing up against systemic discrimination and efforts to build a more just, equitable future.

The endorsement process includes candidate questionnaires, candidate interviews, and candidate forums.

In August 2024, BMLC Fund announced its endorsement of Vice President Kamala Harris for president of the United States.

== Leadership ==
Since its founding in 2024, BMLC and the BLMC Fund have been led by Founder and CEO Salima Suswell.

BMLC Fund is overseen by a Board. BMLC Fund's work is strategically guided by the Black Muslim Leadership Political Roundtable, which was first convened in December 2023 by Suswell. The Roundtable meets monthly.
