= Uncommitted (voting option) =

Voting option in US presidential primaries

"Uncommitted" is a voting option in some United States presidential primaries. This option is listed along with the names of individuals running for the position and is often described as "none of the above". Depending on state and party thresholds, voting uncommitted may allow states to send uncommitted delegates to a party's nominating convention.

== Process ==
In the United States, voting in a presidential primary instructs party delegates who to vote for in the nominating convention. By voting uncommitted, you simply do not give an instruction to your delegates. Under Democratic National Committee rules, uncommitted receives delegates if the option receives more than 15% of the statewide vote or more than 15% of the vote in a congressional district. Under Republican National Committee rules, the local rules of state Republican parties decides how and if uncommitted receives delegates.

== Notable campaigns ==
=== 1984: Hawaii ===
After only Walter Mondale and Jesse Jackson made the ballot for the Hawaii Democratic caucus in 1984, Presidential candidate Gary Hart and Hawaii governor George Ariyoshi urged voters to vote uncommitted. Uncommitted ended up winning the caucus with 63.5% of the vote, receiving 14 delegates. Mondale received 32.3% of the vote and 5 delegates. Jackson received 4.2% of the vote.

=== 2008: Michigan ===
Federal Democratic Party rules prohibit any state, except for Iowa, New Hampshire, Nevada and South Carolina from holding its primary before February 5, or Super Tuesday. In October 2007, the divided Michigan Legislature passed a bill to move the date of the state's presidential primaries to January 15 in an effort to increase the state's influence in the presidential candidate nominating process. On October 9, 2007, following Michigan's breach of DNC rules, Barack Obama, Bill Richardson, Joe Biden, and John Edwards withdrew from the Michigan Democratic Primary ballot. Dennis Kucinich unsuccessfully sought to remove his name from the ballot. Hillary Clinton and Christopher Dodd decided to remain on the ballot.

On December 10, 2007, the Michigan Democratic Party issued a press release stating that the primary would be held on January 15, 2008. The press release also urged supporters of Biden, Edwards, Obama and Richardson to vote "uncommitted" instead of writing in their preferred candidates' names.

In the end, Hillary Clinton received 54.61% of the vote (328,309 votes), uncommitted received 39.61% of the vote (238,168 votes), while other candidates received 5.78% of the vote (34,742 votes).

=== 2024: Michigan, Minnesota, Washington, Massachusetts, Hawaii, Missouri, Rhode Island, New Jersey and Kentucky ===
Uncommitted vote percentage in the 2024 Democratic Party presidential primaries

During the 2024 Michigan Democratic presidential primary, 2024 Minnesota Democratic presidential primary and 2024 Washington Democratic presidential primary, numerous activists and elected officials, including Dearborn Mayor Abdullah Hammoud and House Representative Rashida Tlaib, campaigned for voters to select the uncommitted option in protest of Biden's handling of the Gaza war. Some Armenian Americans also suggested voting uncommitted over Biden's actions involving the 2023 Azerbaijani offensive in Nagorno-Karabakh. In Washington, the state's largest labor union, the United Food and Commercial Workers, endorsed uncommitted.

In response, the advocacy group Democratic Majority for Israel ran ads arguing that voting "uncommitted" would weaken Biden and support Donald Trump. Michigan governor Gretchen Whitmer stated that although she acknowledges the "pain" people feel about the war, she still encouraged people to vote for Biden because "any vote that's not cast for Joe Biden supports a second Trump term".

Additionally, in states like Kentucky there were calls to vote Uncommitted not related to the Israel-Hamas War, but instead due to a sentiment amongst more centrist Democrats that Biden had gone too far left with his support for the Build Back Better initiative, something that neighboring Democratic Senator Joe Manchin opposed. In the end, Kentucky received the most Uncommitted votes of any state, obtaining 17.9%, and winning a majority in a number of counties primarily located in the more rural eastern half of the state.

Michigan received the second-most, Joe Biden received 81.1% of the vote (618,426 votes), uncommitted received 13.3% of the vote (101,100 votes), while other candidates received 5.7% of the vote (43,171 votes). The uncommitted share exceeded that against Barack Obama in 2012, the most recent prior re-election campaign of a Democratic president (though in 2012 it was a caucus rather than a primary). In Minnesota, uncommitted received an even larger share of the vote, at 18.9%, while Biden was cut short to 70.6%.

== Notable results since 2008 ==
The following lists presidential primaries since 2008 where uncommitted received more than 5% of the popular vote:

=== 2008 ===
Primary	Primary winner	Votes	Percentage of popular vote	Uncommitted Delegates	Reference
Michigan Democratic primary	Hillary Clinton	238,168	39.61%	0	
U.S. Virgin Islands Republican caucus	John McCain	153	47.2%	6	
Kentucky Republican primary	John McCain	10,755	5.44%	0	
Idaho Republican primary	John McCain	8,325	6.63%	1	

=== 2012 ===
Primary	Primary winner	Votes	Percentage of popular vote	Uncommitted Delegates	Reference
Michigan Democratic primary	Barack Obama	20,833	10.69%	20	
Massachusetts Democratic primary	Barack Obama	16,075	10.87%	26	
Tennessee Democratic primary	Barack Obama	10,497	11.51%	9	
Alabama Democratic primary	Barack Obama	45,613	15.91%	8	
Maryland Democratic primary	Barack Obama	37,704	11.55%	3	
Rhode Island Democratic primary	Barack Obama	1,133	13.98%	8	
North Carolina Democratic primary	Barack Obama	200,810	20.77%	43	
Kentucky Democratic primary	Barack Obama	86,925	42.15%	34	
Montana Democratic primary	Barack Obama	8,306	9.46%	7	
U.S. Virgin Islands Republican caucus	Ron Paul	132	33.85%	0	
North Carolina Republican primary	Mitt Romney	50,928	5.23%	0	
Kentucky Republican primary	Mitt Romney	10,357	5.88%	0	
South Dakota Republican primary	Mitt Romney	2,797	5.43%	0	

=== 2016 ===
Primary	Primary winner	Votes	Percentage of popular vote	Uncommitted Delegates	Reference
U.S. Virgin Islands Republican caucus	Ted Cruz	1,063	65.3%	1	
Northern Mariana Islands Democratic caucus	Hillary Clinton	22	11.64%	0	
Kentucky Democratic primary	Hillary Clinton	24,104	5.30%	0	

=== 2020 ===
Primary	Primary winner	Votes	Percentage of popular vote	Uncommitted Delegates	Reference
Kentucky Democratic primary	Joe Biden	58,364	10.85%	2	
Montana Republican primary	Donald Trump	13,184	6.18%	0	
New Mexico Republican primary	Donald Trump	13,809	8.75%	0	
Kentucky Republican primary	Donald Trump	57,283	13.35%	0	
Connecticut Republican primary	Donald Trump	12,994	14.21%	0	

=== 2024 ===
Primary	Primary winner	Votes	Percentage of popular vote	Uncommitted Delegates	Reference
Nevada Republican primary	Nikki Haley	50,763	63.30%	0	
Kansas Republican primary	Donald Trump	4,886	5.2%	0	
Nevada Democratic primary	Joe Biden	7,448	5.81%	0	
Michigan Democratic primary	Joe Biden	101,436	13.21%	2	
Alabama Democratic primary	Joe Biden	11,213	6%	0	
Colorado Democratic primary	Joe Biden	43,439	8.1%	0	
Massachusetts Democratic primary	Joe Biden	58,462	9.4%	1	
Minnesota Democratic primary	Joe Biden	45,913	18.9%	11	
North Carolina Democratic primary	Joe Biden	88,021	12.7%	0	
Tennessee Democratic primary	Joe Biden	10,464	7.9%	0	
Hawaii Democratic caucuses	Joe Biden	455	29.1%	7	
Democrats Abroad primary	Joe Biden	1,136	13.2%	0	
Washington Democratic primary	Joe Biden	89,753	9.8%	2	
Kansas Democratic primary	Joe Biden	4,286	10.3%	0	
Missouri Democratic primary	Joe Biden	2,229	11.7%	3	
Connecticut Democratic primary	Joe Biden	7,492	11.5%	0	
Rhode Island Democratic primary	Joe Biden	3,732	14.9%	1	
Wisconsin Democratic primary	Joe Biden	48,162	8.3%	0	
Maryland Democratic primary	Joe Biden	63,743	9.7%	0	
Kentucky Democratic primary	Joe Biden	32,908	17.9%	8	
New Jersey Democratic primary	Joe Biden	43,758	8.9%	2	

== Presidential nominating contests with uncommitted options ==
As of 2024, the following jurisdictions have uncommitted presidential nominating contest voting options:

- Alabama
- American Samoa
- Colorado (Democratic primary only, as Noncommitted Delegate)
- Democrats Abroad (Democratic primary only)
- Connecticut
- Hawaii (Democratic caucuses only)
- Idaho (Democratic caucuses only)
- Iowa (Democratic party-run primary only)
- Kansas (as None of the names shown)
- Kentucky
- Maryland
- Massachusetts (as No Preference)
- Michigan
- Minnesota (Democratic primary only)
- Missouri
- Montana (as No Preference)
- Nevada (as None of these candidates)
- New Jersey (Democratic primary only)
- New Mexico (as Uncommitted delegate)
- North Carolina (as No Preference)
- Rhode Island
- Tennessee
- Texas (Republican primary only)
- U.S. Virgin Islands
- Washington (Democratic primary only)
- Wisconsin (as Uninstructed Delegation)
- Wyoming (as Undeclared)

== See also ==
- None of the above
- None of These Candidates
- Protest vote
