= Uncommitted National Movement =

2024 American anti-war protest campaign

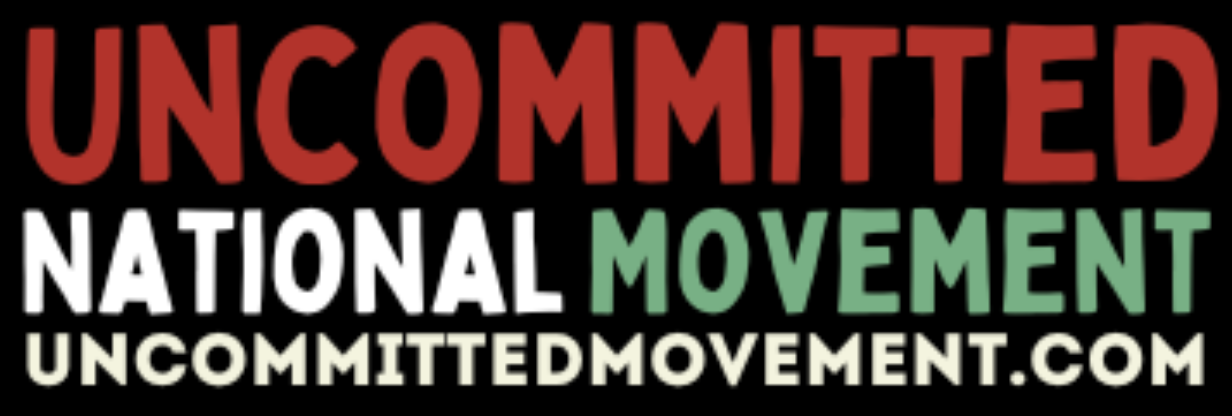
- Predecessor: Listen to Michigan
- Formation: 2024
- Founder: Abbas Alawieh, Layla Elabed
- Founded at: Michigan, United States
- Type: Protest campaign
- Purpose: Pressure the United States government to meet its demands: Secure a ceasefire in the Gaza war; Impose arms embargo on Israel
- Website: www.uncommittedmovement.com

The Uncommitted National Movement was a protest campaign aimed mainly to pressure the United States government to achieve a ceasefire in the Gaza war and impose an arms embargo on Israel. The group received some support in the 2024 Democratic presidential primaries.

"Uncommitted", along with other voting options that do not express support for any candidate, were utilized by the campaign. The movement started in February, when the "Listen to Michigan" campaign attracted a large amount of support from Arab-Americans and progressives against President Joe Biden. The success in Michigan inspired similar campaigns in other states, with a national umbrella organization being founded in March. The campaign ultimately received over 700,000 votes and 37 delegates.

The movement had several interactions with Vice President Kamala Harris's campaign, pushing for an arms embargo. At the Democratic National Convention, it advocated for a Palestinian-American to be allowed to speak, though this was denied. After unsuccessful attempts to pressure or meet with Harris, the group declined to endorse her, though came out against Republican candidate Donald Trump. The movement's role in the election is disputed; some Democrats alleged that its strategy contributed to Trump's win, while others blamed Harris for her lack of outreach to pro-Palestinian voters. Uncommitted activists shifted to local political organizing under the Trump administration.

== Background ==
=== Gaza war ===
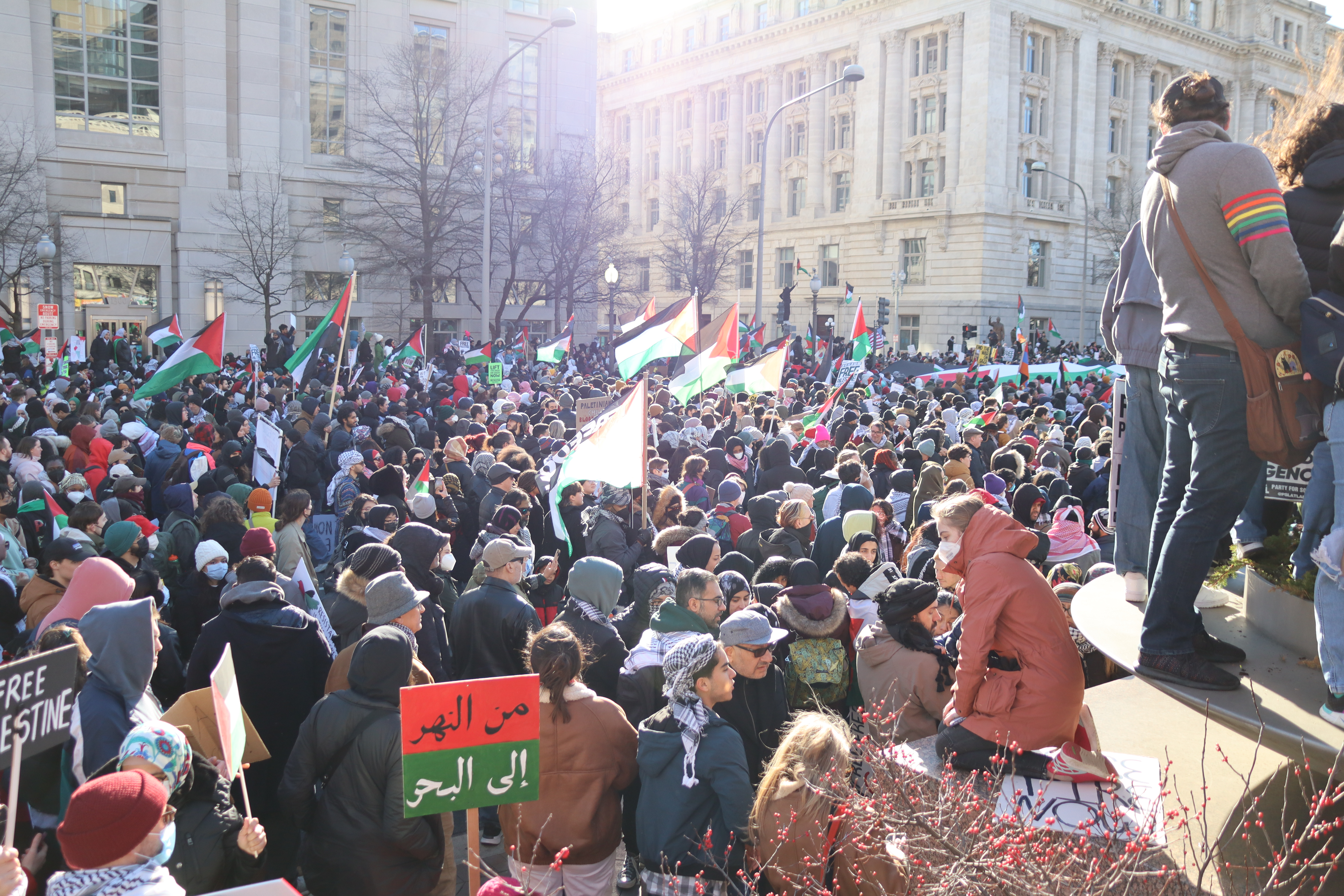
March on Washington for Gaza in January 2024

On October 7, 2023, Hamas and allied militants invaded and attacked southern Israel, killing almost 1,200 people, and taking more than 250 hostages. Following this, Israel retaliated by imposing a total blockade on Gaza, heavily bombing it, and invading it. In its response, Israel killed over 45,000 people and displaced almost two million as of January 2025, in what was alleged to be a genocide. President Joe Biden's support of Israel drew criticism from pro-Palestinian protestors in the United States, and led to the disillusionment of some voters.

=== Uncommitted voting options ===
"Uncommitted" is a voting option in some United States presidential primaries. This option is listed along with the names of individuals running for the position and is often described as "none of the above". Depending on state and party thresholds, voting uncommitted may allow states to send uncommitted delegates to a party's nominating convention.

Other voting options similar to uncommitted include "None of These Candidates", "noncommitted delegate", "no preference", and others.

== Democratic primaries ==
=== Michigan primary ===
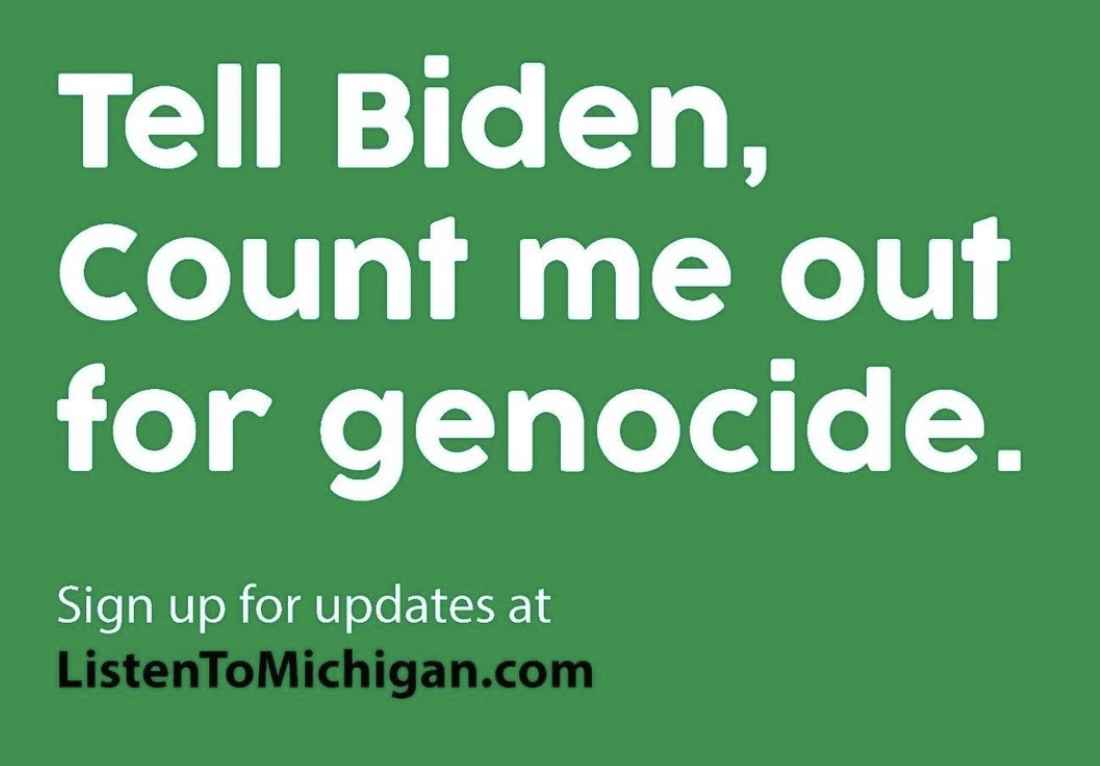
A "Listen to Michigan" campaign graphic

The movement initially started as a campaign called "Listen to Michigan". Michigan has the highest number of Arab-Americans in the United States, many of whom were sympathetic to Palestinians. Activists were seeking to protest Biden's handling of the war in the 2024 Michigan Democratic presidential primary. At the time, the campaign aimed to receive 10,000 uncommitted votes and pressure Biden to call for a ceasefire.

Waleed Shahid, a Democratic strategist, had previously written a memo saying that if anti-war activists utilized protest votes, it could "politicize and electoralize discontent", gaining them greater attention and funding. Co-founders Layla Elabed and Abbas Alawieh, Shahid, and others used "a shoestring budget and a few weeks of intense on-the-ground work" to spread awareness about the uncommitted option ahead of the upcoming primary vote. Progressive groups such as Democratic Socialists of America (DSA) and Our Revolution helped the campaign canvass and email voters. Elabed's sister, Representative Rashida Tlaib, endorsed the campaign, as did former Representative Andy Levin and local officials. In February, the Detroit Metro Times endorsed the campaign.

The campaign received over 100,000 votes (13.2%) and two delegates in the primary. It was mostly supported by young Arab-American voters and progressives. Uncommitted won the majority of the vote in three cities with large Arab populations: Dearborn, Dearborn Heights, and Hamtramck. Dearborn mayor Abdullah Hammoud said that the result showed "Gaza is not an issue that is only of concern to Arab Americans and Muslim Americans. But this is an issue to all Americans from coast to coast".

=== National spread ===
Uncommitted vote percentage in the 2024 Democratic Party presidential primaries

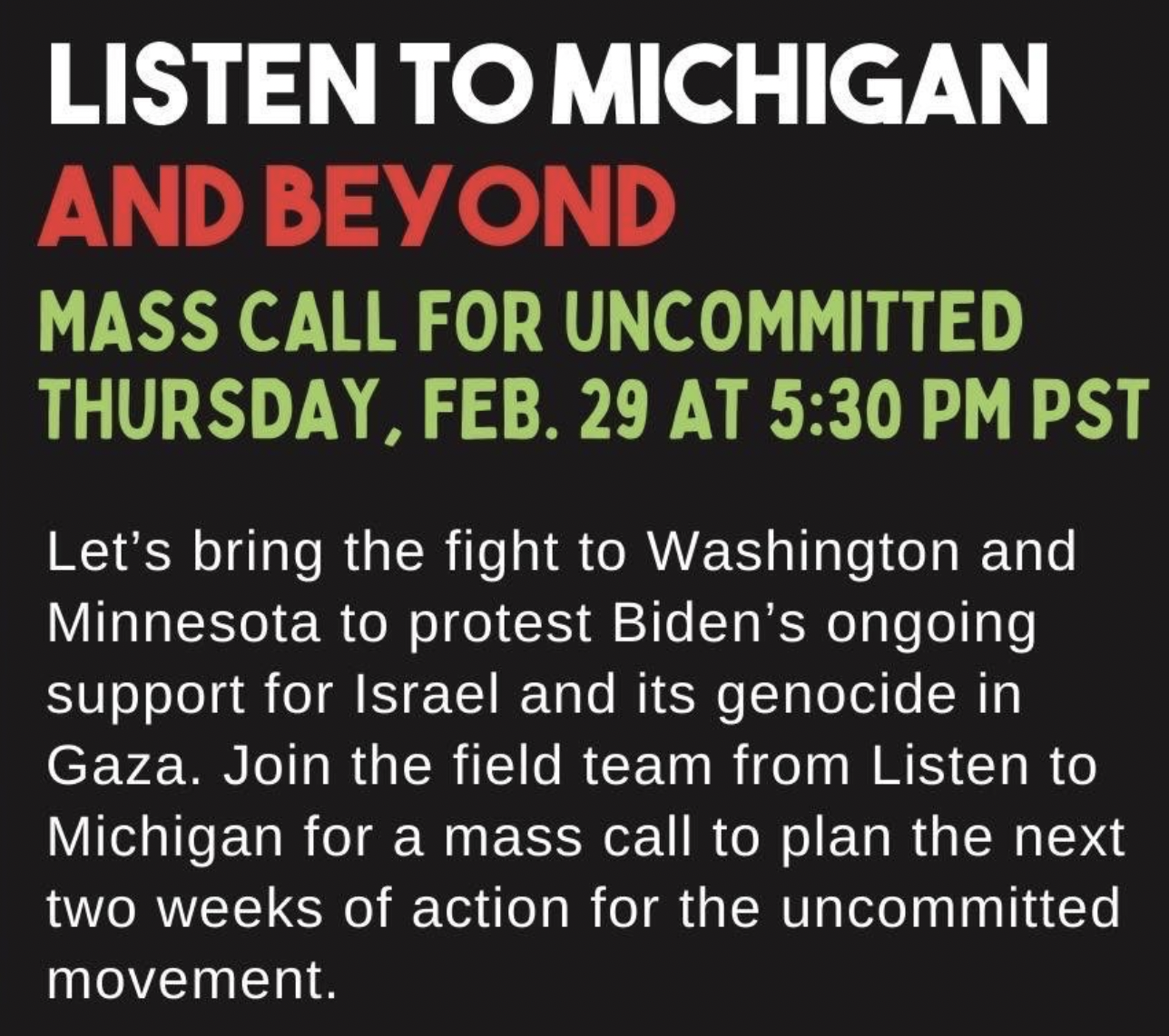
Infographic calling for national Uncommitted votes

The movement spread nationally, as campaigns inspired by Listen to Michigan emerged in other states.

Uncommitted campaigns were quickly organized in Super Tuesday states, most notably in Minnesota, North Carolina, Colorado and Massachusetts. In Minnesota specifically, activists had $20,000 to spend and were organizing to reach voters, seeing success with Arab-American voters in the Minneapolis–Saint Paul area. Uncommitted in Minnesota received about 45,000 votes and 11 delegates. Additionally, Uncommitted campaigns received 12.7% of the vote in North Carolina, 9.4% in Massachusetts, 8.1% in Colorado, 7.9% in Tennessee, 6% in Alabama, and 3.9% in Iowa. "No preference" received one delegate in Massachusetts. One day after Super Tuesday, Uncommitted received 29% of the vote and seven delegates in Hawaii.

On March 18, Listen to Michigan announced it would launch the "Uncommitted National Movement", an umbrella campaign for Uncommitted movements that advocated for a ceasefire. The movement began to focus on the Wisconsin primary and the Democratic National Convention (DNC).

Uncommitted received 13.2% in the Democrats Abroad primary.

In Washington State, the "Uncommitted WA" campaign advocated for an Uncommitted vote early in March, in collaboration with Listen to Michigan activists. The campaign was endorsed by the largest union in the state, United Food and Commercial Workers 3000; a Seattle chapter of the American Federation of Teachers; and Jewish Voice for Peace (JVP). In Seattle, The Stranger newspaper endorsed voting uncommitted in the Washington Democratic presidential primary. Uncommitted ultimately received almost 90,000 votes, 9.81% of the vote, and two delegates from the Seattle area.

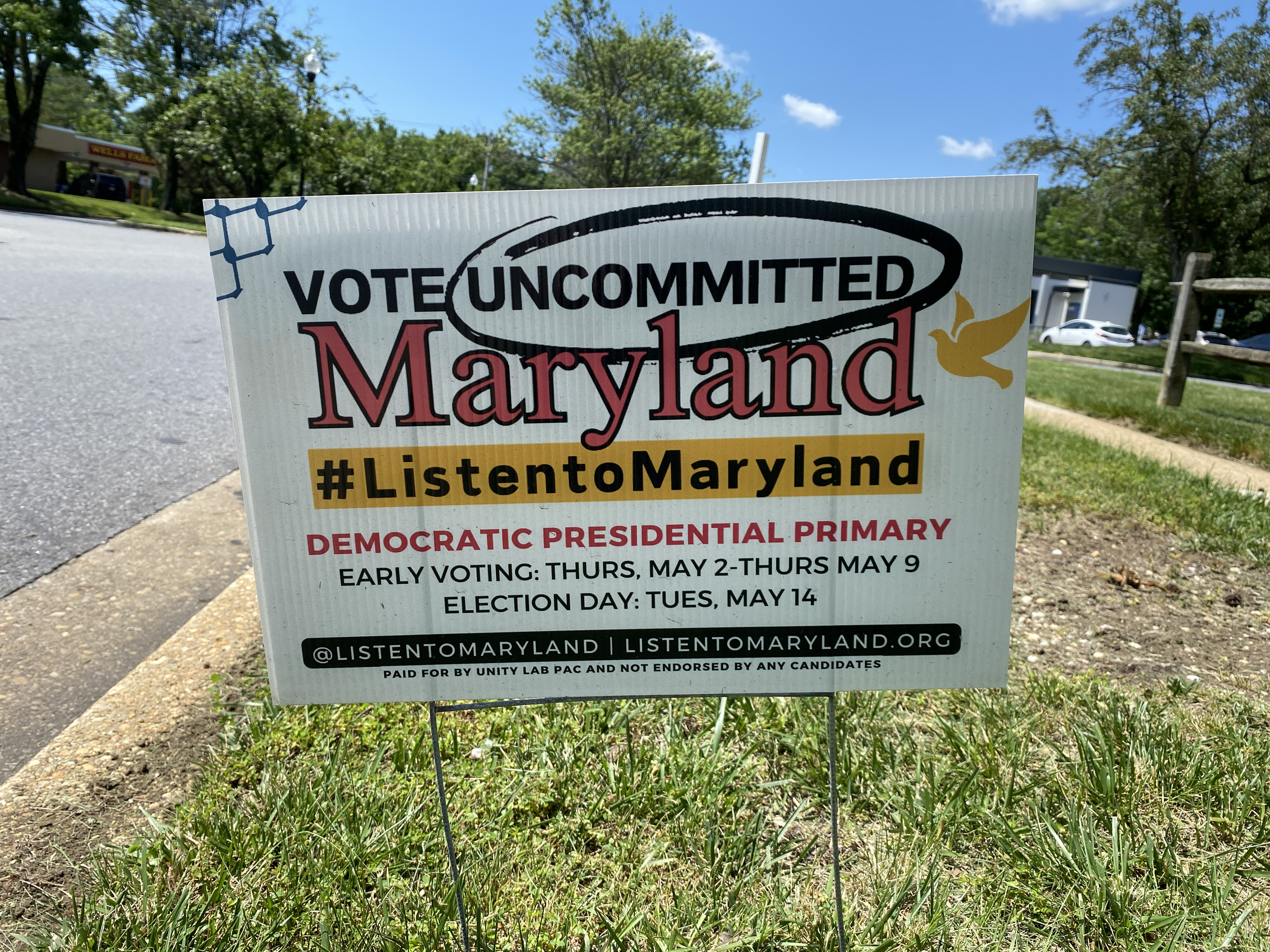
A "Vote Uncommitted Maryland sign in May 2024

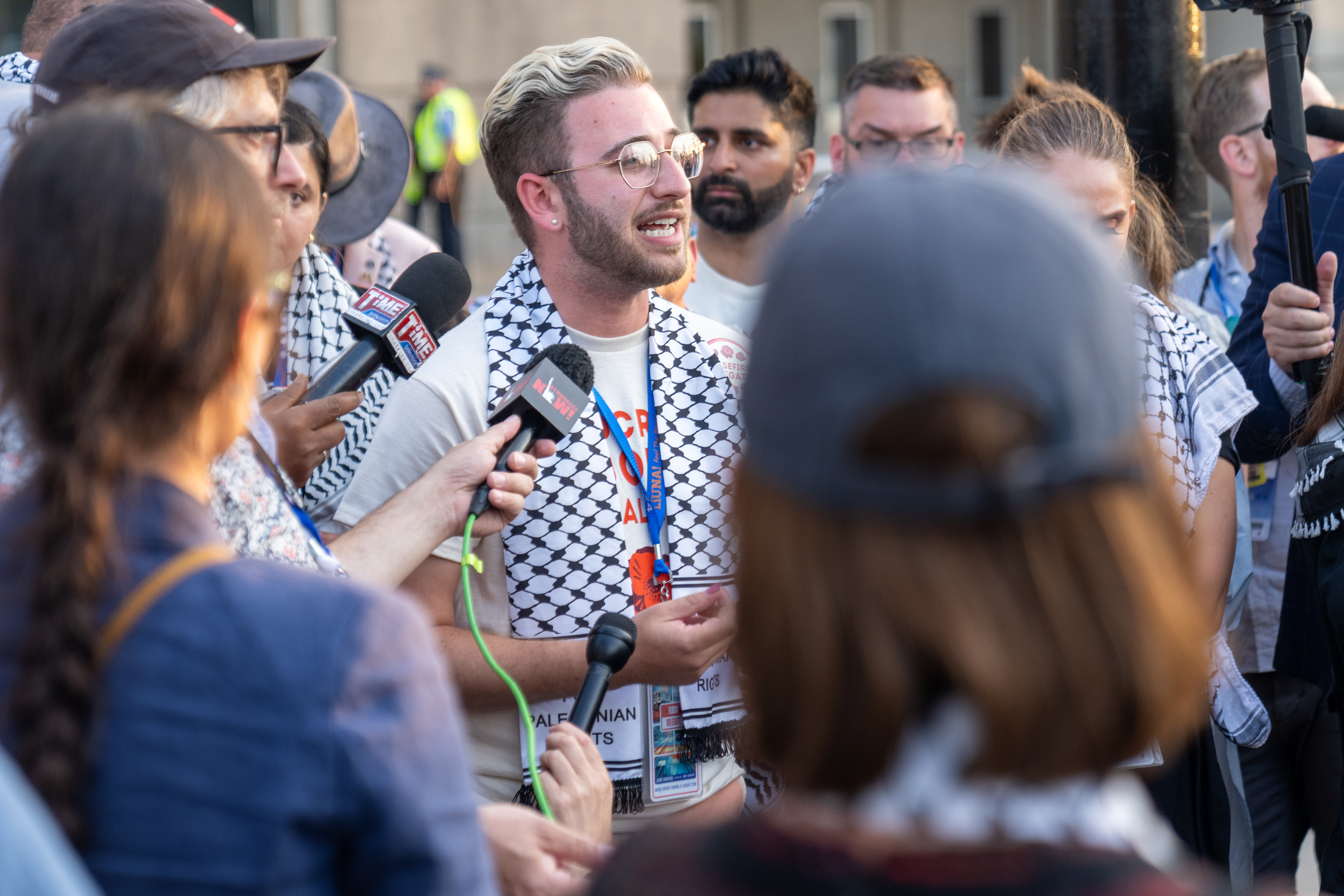
A Rhode Island uncommitted delegate

Uncommitted received 10.3% of the vote in Kansas; 11.7% in Missouri, winning three delegates from the St. Louis area; 11.6% in Connecticut; and 14.5% in Rhode Island, winning one delegate.

"Listen to Wisconsin", a campaign supported by the national movement, garnered nearly 50,000 votes for "uninstructed" in Wisconsin, more than the margin Biden won the state by in 2020. The number of votes was double the number activists were trying to acquire.

The "Listen to Maryland" campaign for Uncommitted received more than 56,000 votes, 9.72% of the vote in Maryland. When initial results came in, a campaign organizer called for a ceasefire, an end to the war, and an arms embargo on Israel.

The "Leave It Blank" campaign in New York urged voters to leave their ballots blank in protest of the war, as New York had no uncommitted option. 11.5% of the vote (41,113 votes) were left blank, and the campaign performed best in socialist-leaning neighborhoods of New York City.

Uncommitted received 17.9% of the vote in Kentucky and eight delegates. These votes were believed to be mostly unrelated to Gaza as Uncommitted fared best in conservative areas, though some have linked them to younger voter dissatisfaction in the war and concern's over Biden's age.

The "Uncommitted NJ" campaign was founded early in 2024 after a meeting between members of three DSA chapters, inspired by the result in Michigan. The campaign was able to collect 3,500 signatures, at least 100 in each district, to comply with election laws. It also received advice from Michigan and Wisconsin Uncommitted activists. Uncommitted ultimately received 9% of the vote and one delegate in New Jersey.

Some campaigns in southern states likely succeeded due to "Democrats in Name Only" (DINOs), registered Democrats that vote for Republicans. According to The New York Times, "unlike younger voters or Arab Americans, DINOs probably did not vote for Mr. Biden in 2020, nor are they likely to vote for him in November. Thus, their lack of support for him in the primaries has less significance for the general".

By the end of the primaries, Uncommitted had received over 700,000 votes and 37 delegates nationwide. However, the state delegations for Kentucky, California, Minnesota, and Pennsylvania did not acknowledge dissenting delegates for Uncommitted or "Present". For example, Kentucky Governor Andy Beshear said, "We are proud to cast 56 votes for the next president of the United States, Kamala Harris!", while Kentucky had 59 delegates. By the start of the DNC, Uncommitted retained 30 delegates.

== Relations with Democratic Party ==
After the Michigan primary, Biden administration officials met with Muslim and Arab-American community leaders, including Alawieh. Alawieh described the meetings as tense, and said that senior officials weren't able to deliver on their demands. Among the officials present were Stephen K. Benjamin, a senior advisor; Tom Perez, the director of the Office of Public Engagement; Jonathan Finer, principal deputy national security adviser; and USAID director Samantha Power. Additionally, the co-chair of Biden's presidential campaign Mitch Landrieu said that it would continue talking to Uncommitted voters.

When Harris became the nominee after Biden withdrew from the race, the movement became "cautiously optimistic" that she would change policy on Israel due to her sympathetic rhetoric. Harris briefly met Elabed and Alawieh at a rally in Michigan, where they told her the movement would like to support her, but that they wanted an arms embargo on Israel first. They requested a meeting on the topic, and Harris seemingly accepted. However, Philip H. Gordon, one of Harris's national security advisors, clarified that she did not support an embargo.

In early August, it was reported that the Harris campaign had met with Arab-American leaders and activists, as well as Uncommitted allies, in Michigan. Harris's campaign manager Julie Chávez Rodriguez met individually with activists in Metro Detroit, including Osama Siblani, publisher of the Arab American News. During the meeting between Chávez Rodriguez and Siblani, Chávez Rodriguez agreed with Siblani that "the killing has to stop", but Siblani questioned how, saying there was no plan. Harris herself met with Abdullah Hammoud, the mayor of Dearborn, Michigan, which had the largest Arab-American population in the United States, to discuss the war and her policy. On August 4, twenty-nine Uncommitted delegates from eight states took part in a virtual roll call where they cast unofficial votes in honor of Palestinians killed in Gaza, including "children, medical workers, journalists, families, and other civilians" according to a delegate.

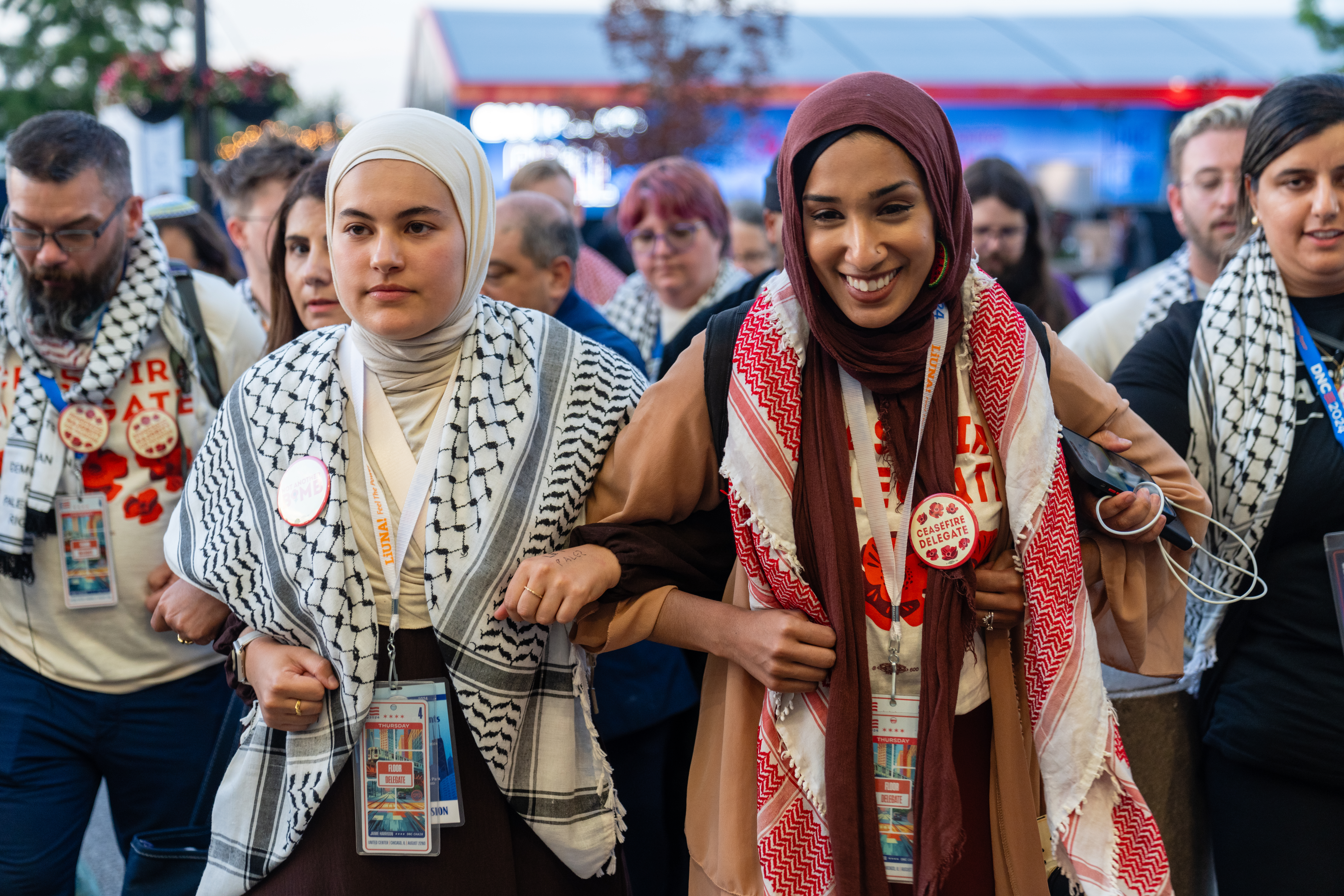
Uncommitted delegates lock arms as they enter the convention.

During the DNC, the Uncommitted delegates were allowed to hold a Palestinian human rights panel, where they and others discussed the war and Harris's position on it. On the second day of the convention, during the in-person ceremonial roll call of delegates, dozens of delegates voted "Present" in protest.

On the third day, the DNC officially rejected the movement's request for a speaker of Palestinian descent. In response, the delegates staged a sit-in outside the convention, calling for a Palestinian speaker. Progressive Congressional bloc "The Squad" and the United Auto Workers union supported the movement's demand. Congresswomen Ilhan Omar and Summer Lee visited the sit-in, while Congresswoman Alexandria Ocasio-Cortez interacted with the delegates via FaceTime. Some activists stayed at the sit-in overnight and into day four of the convention. A group called "Muslim Women for Harris-Walz" disbanded after the decision, saying it "cannot in good conscience continue". The DNC did not meet the movement's deadline of 6 pm CDT to allow a speaker. According to Elabed, party officials said the day had to be about Harris's speech and nomination. Shahid said the movement rejected other meetings the campaign had offered them with congressional officials and staff. The movement then demanded that Harris or a senior campaign official have an in-person conversation with its leaders by September 15. The movement also said that Harris's speech didn't shift policy from Biden's stance, with one delegate saying her call for Palestinian self-determination was incompatible with continued arms transfers to Israel.

After the convention, the movement sent a letter to Harris and her advisors calling for a ceasefire and contact with people affected by the war, also expressing discontent at the refusal of a Palestinian speaker. Harris's team responded by saying the movement didn't request any specific engagements. After the deadline passed without a meeting, on September 18, the movement issued a statement saying that it would not endorse Harris because of her "unwillingness to shift on unconditional weapons policy or to even make a clear campaign statement in support of upholding existing U.S. and international human rights law". However, it said that voters should not support Trump or third-party candidates. In response, a spokesperson for the Harris campaign said that Harris would try to earn peoples' votes and secure a ceasefire.

The movement's founders were not invited to a meeting between Arab-Americans and Harris on October 4. On October 8, in messages posted across all its social media channels, the group came out firmly against Trump. The group argued that a Trump presidency would be worse than Harris, highlighting his strong embrace of Netanyahu in his first term and arguing Trump had "effectively dismantled any pathway to Palestinian self-determination". The group also highlighted far-right proposals in Project 2025 and comments made by pro-Israel Trump allies David M. Friedman, Jared Kushner, and Miriam Adelson. Massachusetts Uncommitted, breaking from the group, endorsed a third-party vote, saying "given the choice between genocide and fascism, we choose neither".

Following Trump's victory in the presidential election, Alawieh emphasized that the "status quo is not a compelling message for voters". He voiced concerns about heightened surveillance and violence against Arab and Muslim Americans, criticizing the Democratic Party by stating, "I believe actually it's Democrats' fault for abandoning our party," and adding, "Donald Trump's playing us. Democrats are allowing him to play us". Uncommitted activist and leader Lexis Zeidan said that the movement was not over under Trump. The group said that while organizing under Trump was an "uphill battle", it planned on continuing pressure on the government. The movement shifted to local political tactics for the Trump administration, aiming to support pro-Palestinian candidates in down-ballot races, with some noting it has little influence over Trump. The movement was criticized for being "uncharacteristically quiet" under the Trump administration. By 2026, Alawieh and Elabed worked with "Arab Americans for Progress", while Shahid worked in the New York City Mayor Zohran Mamdani's administration. Alawieh went on to win the Democratic primary for a Michigan state senate seat. Harris met with Alawieh during the campaign, after which he urged her and other Democratic leaders to oppose "endless wars" including in Gaza and Lebanon.

== Analysis ==
Power without conscience breeds injustice, but conscience without power is a sermon no one hears ... The lesson isn’t that protest fails. It’s that protest without power hits a ceiling.

— Waleed Shahid

2020-2024 presidential swing in Michigan

In the leadup to the election, multiple media outlets said that the movement's support, specifically in the swing state of Michigan, would hinder Democratic unity and increase Harris's chances of losing the election. The movement said Harris risked losing swing states such as Michigan, where Arab and Muslim voters "know firsthand the effects and the impact of American-funded bombing", if she did not support a permanent ceasefire in Gaza and commit to stopping weapons shipments to Israel.

A Minnesota Uncommitted organizer argued that because of the movement, Harris began calling for a ceasefire in the war. Ocasio-Cortez, in an interview with Stephen Colbert, praised the movement for "using this process to be seen" and not "giv[ing] way to cynicism". When Biden halted a weapons shipment to Israel over the Rafah offensive, the movement said it was a step forward and that the anti-war movement had "propelled" such actions.

Analyses of the movement's success at the DNC differed. Shahid, in an opinion piece for Jacobin, argued that while the movement did not achieve its demands, it still succeeded by receiving support from the Democratic base. However, an opinion piece in The Nation said that the convention was an "undeniable disappointment" for the movement, as they hadn't secured any major concessions. The broader protest movement also faced divisions, with some activists saying the campaign was too tolerant with Harris and was "getting played".

Some have argued that the movement's stance on the election was a soft endorsement of Harris. An opinion piece for MSNBC said that the statement criticized Harris's policy on Israel but encouraged people to vote for her. It also said that the stance was an admission that the movement was weak but wanted to influence Democratic policy. "Abandon Harris", an anti-Harris protest movement, said in a statement that Uncommitted wanted to endorse Harris, but couldn't, "because the community [it] claim[s] to represent would tear [it] apart". Former Michigan Senate leader Jim Ananich described it as "close to a win" for Michigan Democrats.

Michael Traugott, a Michigan-based political scientist, wrote in The Conversation that Biden and Harris's lack of outreach to Arab-American voters in Wayne County, where the greatest number of Uncommitted votes came from, contributed to Michigan's rightward shift. Some have connected Harris's struggles with Arab-American and Uncommitted voters with her broader underperformances with nonwhite voters. Leaders of the movement blamed Harris for not engaging with it and the community. Elabed said that Harris "chose the path of Liz Cheney and the donor class". CEO of Muslim advocacy group Emgage Action Wa'el Alzayat said that Harris would've had higher support if she signaled that she would break from Biden on Gaza, but added "What kind of peace and freedom for the Palestinians are we going have under Mike Huckabee and Tulsi Gabbard? ... What kind of rights are pro-Palestinian students going to have?" Writer Camonghne Felix said in an opinion piece for argued that the movement succeeded by showing that Gaza was a mainstream issue, and said that Democrats' chances of gains in the 2026 elections were slim unless it pursued an end to the conflict.

Democrats had mixed responses to the role of Uncommitted in the election. Many criticized it, claiming Trump was worse on the issue of Gaza and that the movement contributed to Trump's win. In response to a statement from Elabed blaming Harris for leaving a "vacuum" for Trump in Michigan, a former Harris aide called the movement "deeply unserious people" and "clowns". A former organizer for Harris however alleged that staff was directed to mark responses to emails about Gaza as "no response", saying "the only 'clowns' out there are those who were in senior leadership and decided to abdicate on this issue". Adam Jentleson, former chief of staff for Senator John Fetterman, said that "leaders of the uncommitted movement want to blame everyone but themselves for their disastrous strategy that helped elect Donald Trump". Senator Elissa Slotkin told the Washington Examiner that "I think anyone who trusted Trump to be a new and different actor on the Middle East was probably just not listening closely enough". Representative Jim McGovern deflected blame from the movement, saying "We don't have time to do the blame [game] again". On social media, the group received backlash from Democrats for a post addressing the election results.

In January 2025, The Week noted that the Biden administration "barely shifted from its staunch pro-Israel policies" and that the incoming Trump administration was hostile to pro-Palestinian activists. In August, Shahid wrote retrospectively about the movement, saying that it failed to gain enough leverage and blaming the center-left establishment for ignoring its concerns. However, he noted a shift after Zohran Mamdani won the 2025 New York City Democratic mayoral primary, which he said "cracked the narrative of inevitability" and allowed politicians to freely oppose Israel.

By August 2026, Vox declared that the movement won in the long term, citing the decrease in support of Israel among Democrats and Americans broadly and the rise of prominent Muslim leftists like Mamdani and Michigan Senate candidate Abdul El-Sayed.

== See also ==
- Mississippi Freedom Democratic Party
- Progressive Democratic Party
- National Democratic Party of Alabama
- 1964 Democratic National Convention
- 1968 Democratic National Convention
