= Results of the 2024 Democratic Party presidential primaries =

Results of the Democratic Party presidential primaries

This article contains the results of the 2024 Democratic Party presidential primaries and caucuses, the processes by which the Democratic Party selects delegates to attend the 2024 Democratic National Convention. The series of primaries, caucuses, and state conventions culminate in the national convention, where the delegates cast their votes to formally select a candidate. A simple majority of the total delegate votes is required to become the nominee.

== Overview of results ==
Democratic primary results
Party	Candidate	Votes	%
Democratic	Joe Biden	14,465,519	87.09%
N/A	Uncommitted	706,591	4.25%
Democratic	Dean Phillips	529,664	3.19%
Democratic	Marianne Williamson	473,761	2.85%
Democratic	Gabriel Cornejo	72,079	0.43%
Democratic	Jason Palmer	20,975	0.13%
N/A	Other candidates	341,513	2.05%
Total votes		16,610,102	100.00%

Map legend
Biden
Palmer
Phillips
Uncommitted
No votes reported
Winner not yet declared

Initial pledged delegate allocation

Map legend
Biden
30 – 40%
40 – 50%
50 – 60%
60 – 70%
70 – 80%
80 – 90%
>90%
Phillips
40 – 50%
50 – 60%
Palmer
50 – 60%
Lozada
100%
Uncommitted
30 – 40%
40 – 50%
60 – 70%
No Votes
No Votes

First-place results by county

== Major candidates ==
Legend:	1st place (popular vote)	2nd place (popular vote)	3rd place (popular vote)	Candidate has withdrawn	Candidate not on ballot

Date (daily totals)	Pledged delegates	Contest	Joe Biden	Dean Phillips	Marianne Williamson	Jason Palmer	Uncommitted	Other	Ref
Cancelled	224	Florida	224 delegates	Primary cancelled					
Cancelled	19	Delaware	19 delegates	Primary cancelled					
January 23	0 (Note: New Hampshire's delegates were not awarded through this non-binding primary outside of the party's official window.)	New Hampshire	63.8% (Note: The candidate did not appear on the ballot, but the candidate or allies ran a write-in campaign.); 79,100 votes	19.7% 24,377 votes	4.0% 5,016 votes	0.1% 142 votes	Not on ballot	12.4% (Note: Includes: 7.1% for other write-in candidates (8,820 votes); 4.1% for other on-ballot candidates (5,029 votes); 1.2% for "ceasefire" as a write-in (1,512 votes)); 15,361 votes	
February 3	55	South Carolina	96.2% 55 delegates 126,493 votes	1.7% 2,247 votes	2.1% 2,732 votes	Not on ballot			
February 6	36	Nevada	89.3% 36 delegates 119,758 votes	Not on ballot	3.1% 4,101 votes	0.4% 530 votes	5.6% 7,448 votes	1.7% (Note: All for other on-ballot candidates); 2,250 votes	
February 27	117	Michigan	81.1% 115 delegates 625,221 votes	2.7% 20,684 votes	3.0% 22,865 votes	Not on ballot	13.2% 2 delegates 101,623 votes	0.0% (Note: All as write-in votes); 178 votes	
January 12 – March 5	40	Iowa (mail-in votes)	90.3% 40 delegates 12,337 votes	2.9% 394 votes	2.2% 307 votes	Not on ballot	4.5% 614 votes	0.1% (Note: All over and under votes); 17 votes	
March 5 (Super Tuesday) (1,380)	52	Alabama	89.5% 52 delegates 168,080 votes	4.5% 8,442 votes	Not on ballot		6.0% 11,283 votes	Not on ballot	
March 5 (Super Tuesday) (1,380)	6	American Samoa	44.0% 3 delegates 40 votes	0.0% 0 votes	Not on ballot	56.0% 3 delegates 51 votes	Not on ballot		
March 5 (Super Tuesday) (1,380)	31	Arkansas	88.5% 31 delegates 71,978 votes	2.9% 2,346 votes	4.8% 3,883 votes	Not on ballot		3.9% (Note: Includes: 1.8% for Stephen Lyons (1,442 votes); 1.1% for Armando Perez-Serrato (879 votes); 1.0% for Frankie Lozada (786 votes)); 3,107 votes	
March 5 (Super Tuesday) (1,380)	424	California	89.1% 424 delegates 3,207,687 votes	2.8% 100,284 votes	4.1% 146,356 votes	Not on ballot		4.0% (Note: Includes: 1.2% for Armando Perez-Serrato (43,105 votes); 1.2% for Gabriel Cornejo (41,390 votes); 0.7% for "President" Boddie (25,455 votes); 0.6% for Stephen Lyons (21,062 votes); 0.4% for Eban Cambridge (12,758 votes); 0.0% for write-in candidates (29 votes)); 143,799 votes	
March 5 (Super Tuesday) (1,380)	72	Colorado	82.5% 72 delegates 477,365 votes	3.1% 17,936 votes	2.9% 16,761 votes	0.7% 3,986 votes	9.0% 52,122 votes	1.9% (Note: Includes: 0.7% for Gabriel Cornejo (4,313 votes); 0.4% for Armando Perez-Serrato (2,591 votes); 0.4% for Frankie Lozada (2,402 votes); 0.3% for Stephen Lyons (1,481 votes)); 10,787 votes	
March 5 (Super Tuesday) (1,380)	24	Maine	82.8% 24 delegates 60,018 votes	6.4% 4,623 votes	Not on ballot			10.8% (Note: Includes: 10.2% as blank ballots, mainly unrecognized write-in votes for "Ceasfire" (7,359 ballots); 0.6% for non-disclosed "other candidates" through write-in (480 votes)); 7,839 ballots	
March 5 (Super Tuesday) (1,380)	92	Massachusetts	80.5% 91 delegates 533,096 votes	4.5% 29,728 votes	3.1% 20,402 votes	Not on ballot	9.1% 1 delegate 60,236 votes	2.8% (Note: Includes: 1.5% for non-disclosed "all other" write-in candidates (10,217 votes); 1.3% as blank ballots (8,930 ballots)); 19,147 votes	
March 5 (Super Tuesday) (1,380)	75	Minnesota	70.1% 64 delegates 171,278 votes	7.8% 18,960 votes	1.4% 3,459 votes	0.3% 758 votes	18.8% 11 delegates 45,914 votes	1.6% (Note: Includes: 0.8% for write-in candidates (2,000 votes); 0.8% for other on-ballot candidates (1,912 votes)); 3,912 votes	
March 5 (Super Tuesday) (1,380)	116	North Carolina	87.3% 116 delegates 609,680 votes	Not on ballot			12.7% 88,900 votes	Not on ballot	
March 5 (Super Tuesday) (1,380)	36	Oklahoma	73.0% 36 delegates 66,882 votes	8.9% 8,182 votes	9.1% 8,356 votes	Not on ballot		9.0% (Note: Includes: 4.8% for Stephen Lyons (4,441 votes); 2.2% for Cenk Uygur (1,974 votes); 2.0% for Armando Perez-Serrato (1,809 votes)); 8,224 votes	
March 5 (Super Tuesday) (1,380)	63	Tennessee	92.1% 63 delegates 122,803 votes	Not on ballot			7.9% 10,475 votes	Not on ballot	
March 5 (Super Tuesday) (1,380)	244	Texas	84.6% 244 delegates 831,247 votes	2.7% 26,473 votes	4.4% 43,667 votes	Not on ballot		8.2% (Note: Includes: 2.8% for Armando Perez-Serrato (27,473 votes); 1.8% for Gabriel Cornejo (17,196 votes); 1.6% for Cenk Uygur (16,100 votes); 1.2% for Frankie Lozada (11,131 votes); 0.9% for Star Locke (8,602 votes)); 80,682 votes	
March 5 (Super Tuesday) (1,380)	30	Utah	86.8% 30 delegates 59,235 votes	4.5% 3,065 votes	5.2% 3,562 votes	Not on ballot		3.5% (Note: Includes: 2.2% for Gabriel Cornejo (1,517 votes); 1.3% for Frankie Lozada (868 votes)); 2,385 votes	
March 5 (Super Tuesday) (1,380)	16	Vermont	83.0% 16 delegates 56,924 votes	2.8% 1,942 votes	4.2% 2,873 votes	0.6% 404 votes	Not on ballot	9.4% (Note: Includes: 4.9% for write-in candidates (3,379 votes); 2.3% as blank ballots and overvotes (1,598 ballots); 1.1% for Mark Greenstein (779 votes); 1.0% for Cenk Uygur (700 votes)); 6,476 votes	
March 5 (Super Tuesday) (1,380)	99	Virginia	88.5% 99 delegates 317,329 votes	3.5% 12,586 votes	8.0% 28,599 votes	Not on ballot			
March 6	22	Hawaii	66.0% 15 delegates 1,047 votes	1.0% 16 votes	3.2% 50 votes	0.4% 6 votes	29.2% 7 delegates 463 votes	0.3% (Note: All for Armando Perez-Serrato.); 5 votes	
March 5–12 (19)	13	Democrats Abroad	80.1% 13 delegates 6,910 votes	Not on ballot	6.7% 576 votes	Not on ballot	13.2% 1,136 votes	Not on ballot	
March 5–12 (19)	6	Northern Mariana Islands	93.9% 6 delegates 93 votes	0.0% 0 votes	2.0% 2 votes	4.0% 4 votes	Not on ballot		
March 12 (235)	108	Georgia	93.1% 108 delegates 276,141 votes	1.8% 5,271 votes	2.9% 8,673 ballots	Not on ballot		2.2% (Note: All as blank ballots); 6,429 votes	
March 12 (235)	35	Mississippi	98.7% 35 delegates 91,053 votes	Not on ballot				1.3% 1,187 votes	
March 12 (235)	92	Washington	83.5% 90 delegates 763,739 votes	2.8% 25,190 votes	2.8% 25,308 votes	Not on ballot	9.8% 2 delegates 89,764 votes	1.2% 10,966 votes	
March 19 (379)	72	Arizona	89.3% 72 delegates 375,110 votes	2.8% 11,611 votes	3.8% 15,844 votes	0.9% 3,752 votes	Not on ballot	3.3% (Note: Includes: 1.5% for Gabriel Cornejo (withdrawn, 6,128 votes); 1.2% for Frankie Lozada (withdrawn, 4,976 votes); 0.7% for Stephen Lyons (withdrawn, 2,753 votes)); 13,857 votes	
March 19 (379)	147	Illinois	91.5% 147 delegates 739,646 votes	3.2% 25,615 votes	3.6% 28,777 votes	Not on ballot	Not on ballot	1.8% (Note: All for Frankie Lozada (withdrawn)); 14,513 votes	
March 19 (379)	33	Kansas	83.7% 33 delegates 35,906 votes	1.3% 566 votes	3.5% 1,494 votes	1.2% 516 votes	10.3% 4,433 votes	Not on ballot	
March 19 (379)	127	Ohio	87.1% 124 delegates 461,558 votes	12.9% 3 delegates 68,629 votes	Not on ballot				
March 23 (112)	48	Louisiana	86.1% 48 delegates 143,380 votes	2.6% 4,351 votes	4.7% 7,898 votes	Not on ballot		6.7% (Note: Includes: 2.3% for Stephen Lyons (withdrawn, 3,770 votes); 1.6% for Bob Ely (2,652 votes); 1.4% for Frankie Lozada (withdrawn, 2,245 votes); 0.7% for Armando Perez-Serrato (1,200 votes); 0.7% for Cenk Uygur (withdrawn, 1,114 votes)); 10,981 votes	
March 23 (112)	64	Missouri	85.3% 61 delegates 16,295 votes	0.9% 178 votes	1.6% 298 votes	0.2% 36 votes	11.7% 3 delegates 2,229 votes	0.3% (Note: Includes: 0.2% for Stephen Lyons (withdrawn, 40 votes); 0.1% for Armando Perez-Serrato (24 votes)); 64 votes	
March 30	13	North Dakota	92.4% 13 delegates 840 votes	1.8% 16 votes	3.4% 31 votes	0.2% 2 votes	Not on ballot	2.2% (Note: Includes: 1.4% for Cenk Uygur (withdrawn, 13 votes); 0.4% for Eban Cambridge (4 votes); 0.3% for Stephen Lyons (withdrawn, 3 votes)); 20 votes	
April 2 (436)	60	Connecticut	84.7% 60 delegates 55,533 votes	0.9% 577 votes	2.3% 1,490 votes	Not on ballot	11.6% 7,619 votes	0.5% (Note: All for Cenk Uygur (withdrawn)); 310 votes	
April 2 (436)	268	New York	80.7% 268 delegates 288,090 votes	3.2% 11,302 votes	4.4% 15,567 votes	Not on ballot		11.8% (Note: Includes: 11.5% as blank ballots (41,092 ballots); 0.3% as void ballots (904 ballots)); 42,016 ballots	
April 2 (436)	26	Rhode Island	80.7% 25 delegates 21,336 votes	2.5% 660 votes	Not on ballot		14.5% 1 delegate 3,834 votes	2.2% 593 votes	
April 2 (436)	82	Wisconsin	88.0% 82 delegates 512,379 votes	3.0% 17,730 votes	Not on ballot		8.3% 48,373 votes	0.7% 4,045 votes	
April 13 (28)	15	Alaska	Voice vote 15 delegates	Withdrawn from ballot	Not on ballot				
April 13 (28)	13	Wyoming	96.0% 13 delegates 380 votes	0.0% 0 votes	0.3% 1 vote	0.0% 0 votes	3.3% 13 votes	0.5% 2 votes (Note: Includes: 0.5% for David Olscamp (2 votes); 0.0% Armando Perez-Serrato (0 votes); 0.0% for Stephen Lyons (withdrawn, 0 votes))	
April 23	159	Pennsylvania	87.9% 159 delegates 953,916 votes	6.4% 69,765 votes	Not on ballot (Note: Automatic write-in access)			5.6% 61,136 votes	
April 28	55	Puerto Rico	85.7% 55 delegates 3,296 votes	4.3% 165 votes	6.0% 230 votes	Not on ballot		4.1% 157 votes (Note: Includes: 2.8% as blank ballots (109 votes); 1.2% as void ballots (48 votes))	
May 7	79	Indiana	100.0% 79 delegates 178,253 votes	Not on ballot					
May 14 (144)	95	Maryland	87.1% 95 delegates 591,523 votes	1.2% 8,188 votes	1.9% 12,935 votes	Not on ballot	9.8% 66,168 votes	Not on ballot	
May 14 (144)	29	Nebraska	90.2% 28 delegates 84,677 votes	9.8% 1 delegate 9,199 votes	Not on ballot				
May 14 (144)	20	West Virginia	70.5% 20 delegates 68,165 votes	7.5% 7,223 votes	Not on ballot	11.5% 11,079 votes	Not on ballot	10.5% 10,159 votes (Note: Includes: 7.6% for Stephen Lyons (withdrawn, 7,372 votes); 2.9% for Armando Perez-Serrato (2,787 votes))	
May 21 (119)	53	Kentucky	71.3% 45 delegates 131,449 votes	4.7% 8,744 votes	6.1% 11,190 votes	Not on ballot	17.9% 8 delegates 32,908 votes	Not on ballot	
May 21 (119)	66	Oregon	87.1% 66 delegates 397,702 votes	Not on ballot	7.4% 33,603 votes	Not on ballot		5.5% 25,135 votes	
May 23	23	Idaho	95.2% 23 delegates 2,297 votes	0.6% 14 votes	3.3% 79 votes	0.2% 5 votes	Not on ballot	0.7% 17 votes (Note: Includes: 0.6% for David Olscamp (14 votes); 0.1% Armando Perez-Serrato (3 votes))	
June 4 (216)	20	Washington D.C.	84.5% 20 delegates 80,240 votes	Withdrawn from ballot	4.2% 3,958 votes	Not on ballot		11.3% 10,758 votes (Note: Includes: 1.1% for Armando Perez-Serrato (1,030 votes); 7.5% for write-in candidates (7,113 votes); 2.8% as over and under votes (2,615 votes))	
June 4 (216)	20	Montana	91.1% 20 delegates 94,587 votes	Not on ballot			8.9% 9,285 votes	Not on ballot	
June 4 (216)	126	New Jersey	88.0% 124 delegates 458,281 votes	Not on ballot			9.0% 2 delegates 46,988 votes	3.0% 15,488 votes (Note: Includes: 2.7% for Terrisa Bukovinac (14,179 votes); 0.2% for write-in candidates (1,269 votes))	
June 4 (216)	34	New Mexico	83.5% 34 delegates 111,049 votes	Withdrawn from ballot	6.7% 8,935 votes	Not on ballot	9.7% 12,938 votes	Not on ballot	
June 4 (216)	16	South Dakota	74.6% 16 delegates 13,372 votes	9.6% 1,723 votes	11.6% 2,073 votes	Not on ballot		4.3% 763 votes	
June 8 (13)	7	Guam	Unopposed; 7 delegates	Not on ballot					
June 8 (13)	7	U.S. Virgin Islands	99.6% 7 delegates 467 votes	Not on ballot	0.2% 1 votes	Not on ballot	0.2% 1 votes	Not on ballot	
Total	3,949	See above	3,905 delegates	4 delegates	0 delegates	3 delegates	37 delegates	0 delegates	

=== Other candidates ===
Over a thousand individuals have filed with the Federal Election Commission to run for president.

==== Candidates on the ballot in at least three states ====
Legend:	1st place (popular vote)	2nd place (popular vote)	3rd place (popular vote)	Candidate has withdrawn	Candidate not on ballot

Candidates			Eban Cambridge	Gabriel Cornejo	Frankie Lozada	Stephen Lyons	Armando Perez-Serrato	Cenk Uygur
Date	Delegates	State						
Jan 23	0	NH	47	86	73	80	68	Unknown (Note: Write-in, reported as "scatter".)
Feb 6	36	NV	0	811	315	147	264	0
Mar 5	31	AR			786	1,442	879	
Mar 5	424	CA	12,758	41,190		21,062	43,105	0
Mar 5	86	CO		4,313	2,402	1,481	2,591	0
Mar 5	92	MN	235	323	290		372	692
Mar 5	40	OK	0			4,441	1,809	1,974
Mar 5	272	TX	0	17,196	11,311		27,473	16,100
Mar 5	34	UT	0	1,503	859			0
Mar 5	23	VT	0				0	700
Mar 19	72	AZ	0	6,128	4,976	2,753	0	
Mar 19	147	IL	0	0	14,398	0	0	
Mar 23	54	LA	0		2,245	3,770	1,200	1,114
Mar 23	70	MO	0			40	24	0
Mar 30	14	ND	4	0	0	3	0	13
Apr 2	60	CT						316
Totals as of April 4			12,990	72,079	35,199	31,271	76,204	19,793

==== Candidates on the ballot in fewer than three states ====
National popular vote totals for other candidates
Candidate	Votes		States on ballot
Other‡	4,949		Various states
"President" R. Boddie	136	25,304	(NH, CA)
Mark Prascak	35		(NV)
Derek Nadeau	1,587		(NH)
Vermin Supreme	905		(NH)
John Vail	679		(NH)
Donald Picard	365	117	(NH, NV)
Paperboy Prince	316		(NH)
Paul V. LaCava	175		(NH)
Mark Stewart Greenstein	131	779	(NH, VT)
Terrisa Bukovinac	101	13,410	(NH, NJ)
Tom Koos	71		(NH)
Star Locke	57	8,326	(NH, TX)
Raymond Michael Moroz	51		(NH)
Richard Rist	37		(NH)
Superpayaseria Crystalroc	128		(NV)
Bob Ely	2,652		(LA)
Brent Foutz	91		(NV)
John Haywood	225		(NV)
Stephen Alan Leon	92		(NV)

†Sometimes listed as "None of the Above"

‡Some states don't count some write-ins or minor candidates individually but lump them together.

==== Candidates with significant write-in totals ====
The following candidates and terms received significant numbers of tabulated votes as a write-in candidate nationwide.

Candidate	Votes
Nikki Haley (Note: Candidate was not running in this primary.)	4,937
Donald Trump	2,143
"Ceasefire"	1,512
Robert F. Kennedy Jr.	754
Rashida Tlaib	735
"Blank"	539
Bernie Sanders	405
Cornel West	77
Kamala Harris	23

== Results by state ==
=== New Hampshire ===
Popular vote share by county
Biden
- 50–60%
- 60–70%

Popular vote share by municipality
Biden
- 40–50%
- 50–60%
- 60–70%
- 70–80%
- 80–90%
- >90%
Phillips
- 30–40%
- 80–90%
Tie
No Results
No Polling Places

New Hampshire Democratic primary, January 23, 2024
Candidate	Votes	%
Joe Biden (incumbent; write-in)	79,100	63.79
Dean Phillips	24,377	19.66
Marianne Williamson	5,016	4.05
Derek Nadeau	1,616	1.30
"Cease Fire" (write-in)	1,512	1.22
Vermin Supreme	912	0.74
John Vail	685	0.55
Robert F. Kennedy Jr. (write-in) (Ind.)	439	0.35
Donald Picard	371	0.30
Paperboy Prince	326	0.26
Paul V. LaCava	176	0.14
Jason Michael Palmer	142	0.11
President R. Boddie	136	0.11
Mark Stewart Greenstein	133	0.11
Bernie Sanders (write-in) (Ind.)	125	0.10
Terrisa Bukovinac	101	0.08
Gabriel Cornejo	86	0.07
Stephen P. Lyons	80	0.06
Frankie Lozada	73	0.06
Tom Koos	71	0.06
Armando "Mando" Perez-Serrato	68	0.05
Star Locke	59	0.05
Raymond Michael Moroz	52	0.04
Eban Cambridge	47	0.04
Richard Rist	37	0.03
Nikki Haley (write-in) (Republican)	4,760	3.84
Donald Trump (write-in) (Republican)	2,079	1.68
Chris Christie (write-in) (Republican)	41	0.03
Ron DeSantis (write-in) (Republican)	33	0.03
Vivek Ramaswamy (write-in) (Republican)	2	<0.01
Other write-in votes, reported as "Scatter".	1,341	1.08
Total	123,996	100%

No delegates were awarded from the January New Hampshire primary.

The January New Hampshire primary was not sanctioned by the Democratic National Committee (DNC). The DNC-approved 2024 calendar placed the South Carolina primary first, but New Hampshire state law mandates them to hold the first primary in the country, and a "bipartisan group of state politicians", including the chairs of the Democratic and the Republican parties, announced that the state would preserve this status. Thus, the DNC initially stripped all 33 of the state's delegates that would have been allocated to the Democratic National Convention.

=== South Carolina ===
Popular vote share by county Biden: >90%

2024 South Carolina Democratic primary
Candidate	Votes	%	Delegates
Joe Biden (incumbent)	126,493	96.21	55
Marianne Williamson	2,732	2.08	0
Dean Phillips	2,247	1.71	0
Total	131,472	100%	55

=== Nevada ===
Popular vote share by county Biden: 60–70%; 70–80%; 80–90%; >90%

2024 Nevada Democratic primary
Candidate	Votes	%	Delegates
Joe Biden (incumbent)	119,758	89.31	36
Marianne Williamson	4,101	3.06	0
Gabriel Cornejo	811	0.60	0
Jason Palmer	530	0.40	0
Frankie Lozada	315	0.23	0
Armando Perez-Serrato	264	0.20	0
John Haywood	241	0.18	0
Stephen Lyons	147	0.11	0
Superpayaseria Crystalroc	133	0.10	0
Donald Picard	124	0.09	0
Brent Foutz	93	0.07	0
Stephen Alan Leon	89	0.07	0
Mark R. Prascak	33	0.02	0
None of These Candidates	7,448	5.55	—
Total	134,087	100%	36

=== Michigan ===
Popular vote share by county
Biden
- 70–80%
- 80–90%

Popular vote share by congressional district
Biden
- 70–80%
- 80–90%

2024 Michigan Democratic primary
Candidate	Votes	%	Delegates
Joe Biden (incumbent)	625,221	81.14	115
Uncommitted	101,623	13.19	2
Marianne Williamson (withdrawn)	22,865	2.97	0
Dean Phillips	20,684	2.68	0
Write-in votes	178	0.02	—
Total	770,571	100%	117

=== Alabama ===
Popular vote share by county Biden: 60–70%; 70–80%; 80–90%; >90%

2024 Alabama Democratic primary
Candidate	Votes	%	Delegates
Joe Biden (incumbent)	168,080	89.50	52
Dean Phillips	8,442	4.50	0
Uncommitted	11,283	6.01	0
Total	187,805	100%	52

=== Arkansas ===
Popular vote share by county Biden: 70–80%; 80–90%; >90%

2024 Arkansas Democratic pres. primary
Candidate	Votes	%	Delegates
Joe Biden (incumbent)	71,978	88.52	31
Marianne Williamson	3,883	4.78	0
Dean Phillips	2,346	2.89	0
Stephen Lyons	1,442	1.77	0
Armando Perez-Serrato	879	1.08	0
Frankie Lozada	786	0.97	0
Total	81,314	100%	31

=== American Samoa ===
2024 American Samoa Democratic pres. caucus
Candidate	Votes	%	Delegates
Jason Palmer	51	56.04	3
Joe Biden (incumbent)	40	43.96	3
Dean Phillips	0	0.00	0
Total	91	100%	6

=== California ===
Popular vote share by county
Biden
- 80–90%
- >90%

Popular vote share by congressional district
Biden
- 70–80%
- 80–90%
- >90%

2024 California Democratic pres. primary
Candidate	Votes	%	Delegates
Joe Biden (incumbent)	3,207,687	89.15	424
Marianne Williamson	146,356	4.07	0
Dean Phillips	100,284	2.79	0
Armando Perez-Serrato	43,105	1.20	0
Gabriel Cornejo	41,390	1.15	0
"President" R. Boddie	25,455	0.71	0
Stephen P. Lyons	21,062	0.59	0
Eban Cambridge	12,758	0.35	0
Write-in votes	29	<0.01	—
Total	3,598,126	100%	424

=== Colorado ===
Popular vote share by county Biden: 50–60%; 60–70%; 70–80%; 80–90%; >90%

2024 Colorado Democratic pres. primary
Candidate	Votes	%	Delegates
Joe Biden (incumbent)	477,365	82.45	72
Dean Phillips	17,936	3.10	0
Marianne Williamson	16,761	2.90	0
Gabriel Cornejo	4,313	0.74	0
Jason Palmer	3,986	0.69	0
Armando Perez-Serrato	2,591	0.45	0
Frankie Lozada	2,402	0.41	0
Stephen Lyons	1,481	0.26	0
Noncommitted Delegate	52,122	9.00	0
Total	578,957	100%	72

=== Iowa ===
Popular vote share by county Biden: 60–70%; 70–80%; 80–90%; >90%

2024 Iowa Democratic pres. caucuses
Candidate	Votes	%	Delegates
Joe Biden (incumbent)	12,337	90.26	40
Dean Phillips	394	2.88	0
Marianne Williamson (Note: While voting was ongoing, Williamson suspended and then unsuspended her campaign.)	307	2.25	0
Uncommitted	614	4.49	0
Over and under votes	17	0.12	—
Total	13,669	100%	40

=== Maine ===
Popular vote share by county Biden: 80–90%; >90%

2024 Maine Democratic pres. primary
Candidate	Votes	%	Delegates
Joe Biden (incumbent)	60,018	82.81	24
Dean Phillips	4,623	6.38	0
Other candidates (write-in) (Note: The names of write-in votes were only published as "Others".)	480	0.66	—
Blank ballots	7,359	10.15	—
Total	72,480	100%	24

=== Massachusetts ===
Popular vote share by county Biden: 70–80%; 80–90%

Massachusetts Democratic primary, March 5, 2024
Candidate	Votes	%	Delegates
Joe Biden (incumbent)	533,096	80.45	91
No Preference	60,236	9.09	1
Dean Phillips	29,728	4.49	0
Marianne Williamson	20,402	3.08	0
Cenk Uygur (write-in)	82	0.01	0
Other candidates (write-in) (Note: The names of non-disclosed write-in votes were published as "All Others".)	10,135	1.53	—
Blank ballots	8,930	1.35	—
Total	662,609	100%	92

=== Minnesota ===
Popular vote share by county
Biden
- 50–60%
- 60–70%
- 70–80%
- 80–90%

Popular vote share by congressional district
Biden
- 50–60%
- 60–70%
- 70–80%

2024 Minnesota Democratic pres. primary
Candidate	Votes	%	Delegates
Joe Biden (incumbent)	171,278	70.12	64
Uncommitted	45,914	18.80	11
Dean Phillips	18,960	7.76	0
Marianne Williamson	3,459	1.42	0
Jason Palmer	758	0.31	0
Cenk Uygur	692	0.28	0
Armando Perez-Serrato	372	0.15	0
Gabriel Cornejo	323	0.13	0
Frankie Lozada	290	0.12	0
Eban Cambridge	235	0.10	0
Write-in votes	2,000	0.82	—
Total	244,281	100%	75

=== North Carolina ===
Popular vote share by county Biden: 60–70%; 70–80%; 80–90%; >90%

2024 North Carolina Democratic pres. primary
Candidate	Votes	%	Delegates
Joe Biden (incumbent)	609,680	87.27	116
No Preference	88,900	12.73	0
Total	698,580	100%	116

=== Oklahoma ===
Popular vote share by county Biden: 30–40%; 40–50%; 50–60%; 60–70%; 70–80%; 80–90%; Phillips: 40–50%

2024 Oklahoma Democratic pres. primary
Candidate	Votes	%	Delegates
Joe Biden (incumbent)	66,882	72.98	36
Marianne Williamson	8,356	9.12	0
Dean Phillips	8,182	8.93	0
Stephen Lyons	4,441	4.85	0
Cenk Uygur	1,974	2.15	0
Armando Perez-Serrato	1,809	1.97	0
Total	91,644	100%	36

=== Tennessee ===
Popular vote share by county Biden: 80–90%; >90%

2024 Tennessee Democratic pres. primary
Candidate	Votes	%	Delegates
Joe Biden (incumbent)	122,803	92.14	63
Uncommitted	10,475	7.86	0
Total	133,278	100%	63

=== Texas ===
Popular vote share by county Biden: 40–50%; 50–60%; 60–70%; 70–80%; 80–90%; >90%; Lozada: 100%; No votes

2024 Texas Democratic pres. primary
Candidate	Votes	%	Delegates
Joe Biden (incumbent)	831,247	84.64	244
Marianne Williamson	43,667	4.45	0
Armando Perez-Serrato	27,473	2.80	0
Dean Phillips	26,473	2.70	0
Gabriel Cornejo	17,196	1.75	0
Cenk Uygur	16,100	1.64	0
Frankie Lozada	11,311	1.15	0
Star Locke	8,602	0.88	0
Total	982,069	100%	244

=== Utah ===
2024 Utah Democratic pres. primary
Candidate	Votes	%	Delegates
Joe Biden (incumbent)	59,235	86.80	30
Marianne Williamson	3,562	5.22	0
Dean Phillips	3,065	4.49	0
Gabriel Cornejo	1,517	2.22	0
Frank Lozada	868	1.27	0
Total	68,247	100%	30

=== Vermont ===
Popular vote share by county Biden: 80–90%; >90%

2024 Vermont Democratic pres. primary
Candidate	Votes	%	Delegates
Joe Biden (incumbent)	56,924	82.98	16
Marianne Williamson	2,873	4.19	0
Dean Phillips	1,942	2.83	0
Mark Greenstein	779	1.14	0
Rashida Tlaib (write-in)	763	1.11	0
Cenk Uygur	700	1.02	0
Jason Palmer	404	0.59	0
Kamala Harris (write-in)	23	0.03	0
"Blank" (write-in)	556	0.81	—
Robert F. Kennedy Jr. (write-in, Independent)	322	0.47	0
Bernie Sanders (write-in, Independent)	288	0.42	0
Nikki Haley (write-in, Republican)	187	0.27	0
Other write-in votes	1,240	1.81	0
Blank ballots and Overvotes	(Note: 1,525 blank ballots, 73 overvotes)1,598	2.33	—
Total	68,599	100%	16

=== Virginia ===
Popular vote share by county Biden: 70–80%; 80–90%; >90%

Virginia Democratic pres. primary
Candidate	Votes	%	Delegates
Joe Biden (incumbent)	317,329	88.51	99
Marianne Williamson	28,599	7.98	0
Dean Phillips	12,586	3.51	0
Total	358,514	100%	99

=== Hawaii ===
2024 Hawaii Democratic pres. caucus
Candidate	Votes	%	Delegates
Joe Biden (incumbent)	1,047	65.97	15
Uncommitted	463	29.17	7
Marianne Williamson	50	3.15	0
Dean Phillips (withdrawn)	16	1.01	0
Jason Palmer	6	0.38	0
Armando Perez-Serrato	5	0.32	0
Total	1,587	100%	22

=== Democrats Abroad ===
2024 Democrats Abroad pres. primary
Candidate	Votes	%	Delegates
Joe Biden (incumbent)	6,907	80.15	13
Marianne Williamson	575	6.67	0
Uncommitted	1,136	13.19	0
Total:	8,618	100%	13

=== Georgia ===
2024 Georgia Democratic pres. primary
Candidate	Votes	%	Delegates
Joe Biden (incumbent)	276,141	95.19	108
Marianne Williamson	8,673	2.99	0
Dean Phillips (withdrawn)	5,271	1.82	0
Total	290,085	100%	108

=== Mississippi ===
2024 Mississippi Democratic pres. primary
Candidate	Votes	%	Delegates
Joe Biden (incumbent)	91,053	98.71	35
Write-in votes (Note: The actual final amount was not known.)	1,187	1.29	—
Total	92,240	100%	35

=== Northern Mariana Islands ===
2024 Northern Mariana Islands Democratic pres. primary
Candidate	Votes	%	Delegates
Joe Biden (incumbent)	93	93.94	6
Jason Palmer	4	4.04	0
Marianne Williamson	2	2.02	0
Dean Phillips (withdrawn)	0	0.00	0
Total	99	100%	6

=== Washington ===
2024 Washington Democratic pres. primary
Candidate	Votes	%	Delegates
Joe Biden (incumbent)	763,739	83.47	90
Uncommitted Delegates	89,764	9.81	2
Marianne Williamson	25,308	2.77	0
Dean Phillips (withdrawn)	25,190	2.75	0
Write-in votes	10,966	1.20	—
Total	914,967	100%	92

=== Arizona ===
2024 Arizona Democratic pres. primary
Candidate	Votes	%	Delegates
Joe Biden (incumbent)	375,110	89.27	72
Marianne Williamson	15,844	3.77	0
Dean Phillips (withdrawn)	11,611	2.76	0
Gabriel Cornejo (withdrawn)	6,128	1.46	0
Frankie Lozada (withdrawn)	4,976	1.18	0
Jason Palmer	3,752	0.89	0
Stephen Lyons (withdrawn)	2,753	0.66	0
Total	420,174	100%	72

=== Illinois ===
2024 Illinois Democratic pres. primary
Candidate	Votes	%	Delegates
Joe Biden (incumbent)	739,646	91.48	147
Marianne Williamson	28,777	3.56	0
Dean Phillips (withdrawn)	25,615	3.17	0
Frankie Lozada (withdrawn)	14,513	1.79	0
Total	808,551	100%	147

=== Kansas ===
2024 Kansas Democratic pres. primary
Candidate	Votes	%	Delegates
Joe Biden (incumbent)	35,906	83.67	33
Marianne Williamson	1,494	3.48	0
Dean Phillips (withdrawn)	566	1.32	0
Jason Palmer	516	1.20	0
None of the names	4,433	10.33	0
Total	42,915	100%	33

=== Ohio ===
2024 Ohio Democratic pres. primary
Candidate	Votes	%	Delegates
Joe Biden (incumbent)	461,558	87.06	124
Dean Phillips (withdrawn)	68,629	12.94	3
Total	530,187	100%	127

=== Louisiana ===
2024 Louisiana Democratic pres. primary
Candidate	Votes	%	Delegates
Joe Biden (incumbent)	143,380	86.06	48
Marianne Williamson	7,898	4.74	0
Dean Phillips (withdrawn)	4,351	2.61	0
Stephen Lyons (withdrawn)	3,770	2.26	0
Bob Ely	2,652	1.59	0
Frankie Lozada (withdrawn)	2,245	1.35	0
Armando Perez-Serrato	1,200	0.72	0
Cenk Uygur (withdrawn)	1,114	0.69	0
Total	166,610	100%	48

=== Missouri ===
Missouri Democratic primary, March 22, 2024
Candidate	Votes	%	Delegates
Joe Biden (incumbent)	16,295	85.31	61
Uncommitted	2,229	11.67	3
Marianne Williamson	298	1.56	0
Dean Phillips (withdrawn)	178	0.93	0
Stephen Lyons (withdrawn)	40	0.21	0
Jason Palmer	36	0.19	0
Armando Perez-Serrato	24	0.13	0
Total	19,100	100%	64

=== North Dakota ===
North Dakota Democratic primary, March 30, 2024
Candidate	Votes	%	Delegates
Joe Biden (incumbent)	840	92.41	13
Marianne Williamson	31	3.41	0
Dean Phillips (withdrawn)	16	1.76	0
Cenk Uygur (withdrawn)	13	1.43	0
Eban Cambridge	4	0.44	0
Stephen Lyons (withdrawn)	3	0.33	0
Jason Palmer	2	0.22	0
Armando Perez-Serrato	0	0.00	0
Total	909	100%	13

=== Connecticut ===
Connecticut Democratic primary, April 2, 2024
Candidate	Votes	%	Delegates
Joe Biden (incumbent)	55,533	84.75	60
Marianne Williamson	1,490	2.27	0
Dean Phillips (withdrawn)	577	0.88	0
Cenk Uygur (withdrawn)	310	0.47	0
Uncommitted	7,619	11.63	0
Total	65,529	100%	60

=== New York ===
New York Democratic primary, April 2, 2024
Candidate	Votes	%	Delegates
Joe Biden (incumbent)	288,090	80.71	268
Marianne Williamson	15,567	4.36	0
Dean Phillips (withdrawn)	11,302	3.17	0
Blank ballots	41,092	11.51	—
Void ballots	904	0.25	—
Total	356,955	100%	268

=== Rhode Island ===
Rhode Island Democratic primary, April 2, 2024
Candidate	Votes	%	Delegates
Joe Biden (incumbent)	21,336	80.75	25
Uncommitted	3,834	14.51	1
Dean Phillips (withdrawn)	660	2.50	0
Write-in votes	593	2.24	—
Total	26,423	100%	26

=== Wisconsin ===
Wisconsin Democratic primary, April 2, 2024
Candidate	Votes	%	Delegates
Joe Biden (incumbent)	512,379	87.96	82
Dean Phillips (withdrawn)	17,730	3.04	0
Uninstructed Delegation	48,373	8.30	0
Write-in votes (as Scattering)	4,045	0.69	—
Total	582,527	100%	82

=== Wyoming ===
Wyoming Democratic caucuses, April 13, 2024
Candidate	Votes	%	Delegates
Joe Biden (incumbent)	380	95.96	13
David Olscamp	2	0.51	0
Marianne Williamson	1	0.25	0
Stephen Lyons (withdrawn)	0	0.00	0
Jason Palmer	0	0.00	0
Armando Perez-Serrato	0	0.00	0
Dean Phillips (withdrawn)	0	0.00	0
Uncommitted	13	3.28	0
Total	396	100%	13

=== Pennsylvania ===
Pennsylvania Democratic primary, April 23, 2024
Candidate	Votes	%	Delegates
Joe Biden (incumbent)	953,916	87.93	159
Dean Phillips (withdrawn)	69,765	6.43	0
Write-in votes	61,136	5.64	—
Total	1,084,817	100%	159

=== Puerto Rico ===
Puerto Rico Democratic primary, April 28, 2024
Candidate	Votes	%	Delegates
Joe Biden (incumbent)	3,296	85.65	55
Marianne Williamson	230	5.98	0
Dean Phillips (withdrawn)	165	4.29	0
Blank and void ballots (Note: Blank 109, void 48 votes)	157	4.08	—
Total	3,848	100%	55

=== Indiana ===
Indiana Democratic primary, May 7, 2024
Candidate	Votes	%	Delegates
Joe Biden	178,253	100.00	79
Total	178,253	100%	79

=== Maryland ===
Maryland Democratic primary, May 14, 2024
Candidate	Votes	%	Delegates
Joe Biden (incumbent)	591,523	87.14	95
Marianne Williamson	12,935	1.91	0
Dean Phillips (withdrawn)	8,188	1.21	0
Uncommitted	66,168	9.75	0
Total	678,814	100%	95

=== Nebraska ===
Popular vote share by county Biden: 50 – 60%; 60 – 70%; 70 – 80%; 80 – 90%; >90%; Phillips: 50 - 60%

Nebraska Democratic primary, May 14, 2024
Candidate	Votes	%	Delegates
Joe Biden (incumbent)	84,677	90.20	28
Dean Phillips (withdrawn)	9,199	9.80	1
Total	93,876	100%	29

=== West Virginia ===
West Virginia Democratic primary, May 14, 2024
Candidate	Votes	%	Delegates
Joe Biden (incumbent)	68,165	70.55	20
Jason Palmer	11,079	11.47	0
Stephen Lyons (withdrawn)	7,372	7.63	0
Dean Phillips (withdrawn)	7,223	7.48	0
Armando Perez-Serrato	2,787	2.88	0
Total	96,626	100%	20

=== Kentucky ===
Kentucky Democratic primary, May 21, 2024
Candidate	Votes	%	Delegates
Joe Biden (incumbent)	131,449	71.33	45
Uncommitted	32,908	17.86	8
Marianne Williamson	11,190	6.07	0
Dean Phillips (withdrawn)	8,744	4.74	0
Total	184,291	100%	53

=== Oregon ===
Oregon Democratic primary, May 21, 2024
Candidate	Votes	%	Delegates
Joe Biden (incumbent)	397,702	87.13	66
Marianne Williamson	33,603	7.36	0
Write-in votes	25,135	5.51	—
Total	456,440	100%	66

=== Idaho ===
Idaho Democratic caucus, May 23, 2024
Candidate	Votes	%	Delegates
Joe Biden (incumbent)	2,297	95.23	23
Marianne Williamson	79	3.28	0
Dean Phillips (withdrawn)	14	0.58	0
David Olscamp	14	0.58	0
Jason Palmer (withdrawn)	5	0.21	0
Armando Perez-Serrato	3	0.12	0
Total	2,412	100%	23

=== Washington D.C. ===
District of Columbia Democratic primary, June 4, 2024
Candidate	Votes	%	Delegates
Joe Biden (incumbent)	80,240	84.50	20
Marianne Williamson	3,958	4.17	0
Armando Perez-Serrato	1,030	1.08	0
Write-in votes	7,113	7.49	—
Over and undervotes (Note: Over votes 108, under votes 2,507)	2,615	2.75	—
Total	94,956	100%	20

=== Montana ===
Montana Democratic primary, June 4, 2024
Candidate	Votes	%	Delegates
Joe Biden (incumbent)	94,587	91.06	20
No preference	9,285	8.94	0
Total	103,872	100%	20

=== New Jersey ===
New Jersey Democratic primary, June 4, 2024
Candidate	Votes	%	Delegates
Joe Biden (incumbent)	458,281	88.01	124
Uncommitted	46,988	9.02	2
Terrisa Bukovinac	14,179	2.72	0
Write-in votes	(Note: The exact final amount was not published.)1,269	0.24	—
Total	520,717	100%	126

=== New Mexico ===
New Mexico Democratic primary, June 4, 2024
Candidate	Votes	%	Delegates
Joe Biden (incumbent)	111,049	83.54	34
Marianne Williamson	8,935	6.72	0
Uncommitted Delegate	12,938	9.73	0
Total	132,922	100%	34

=== South Dakota ===
South Dakota Democratic primary, June 4, 2024
Candidate	Votes	%	Delegates
Joe Biden (incumbent)	13,372	74.57	16
Marianne Williamson	2,073	11.56	0
Dean Phillips (withdrawn)	1,723	9.61	0
Armando Perez-Serrato	763	4.26	0
Total	17,931	100%	16

=== Guam ===
Guam Democratic presidential caucus, June 8, 2024
Candidate	Votes	%	Delegates
Joe Biden (incumbent)	Unopposed	100.0	7
Total	—	100%	7

=== U.S. Virgin Islands ===
United States Virgin Islands Democratic primary, June 8, 2024
Candidate	Votes	Percentage	Actual delegate count		
Candidate	Votes	Percentage	Pledged	Unpledged	Total
Joe Biden (incumbent)	467	100.0%	7		7
Uncommitted	0	0.0%			
Marianne Williamson	0	0.0%			
Total:	467	100.0%	7	6	13

== See also ==
- Results of the 2024 Republican Party presidential primaries
- Results of the 2020 Democratic Party presidential primaries
