= Super Tuesday =

Day with many US presidential primary elections

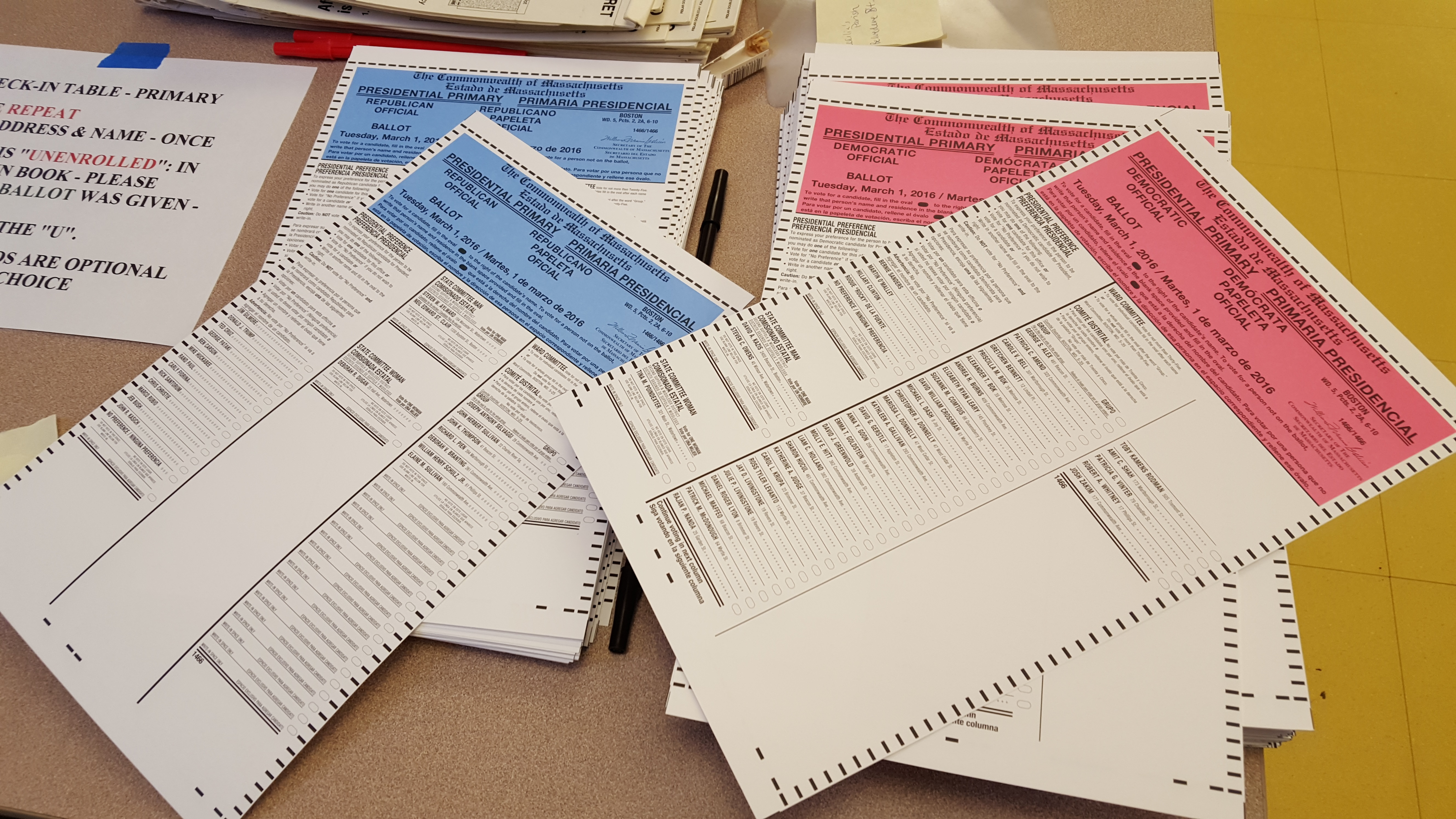
- Republican and Democratic party ballots in a Massachusetts polling location, 2016
- Nickname: Primary Day
- Status: Active
- Date: Varies
- Frequency: Every four years
- Country: United States
- Inaugurated: c.1984
- Previous event: 2024 presidential primaries
- Next event: 2028 presidential primaries
- Participants: Presumptive Democratic and Republican presidential nominees
- Major events: Voting
- 2024 Democratic and Republican Presidential primary

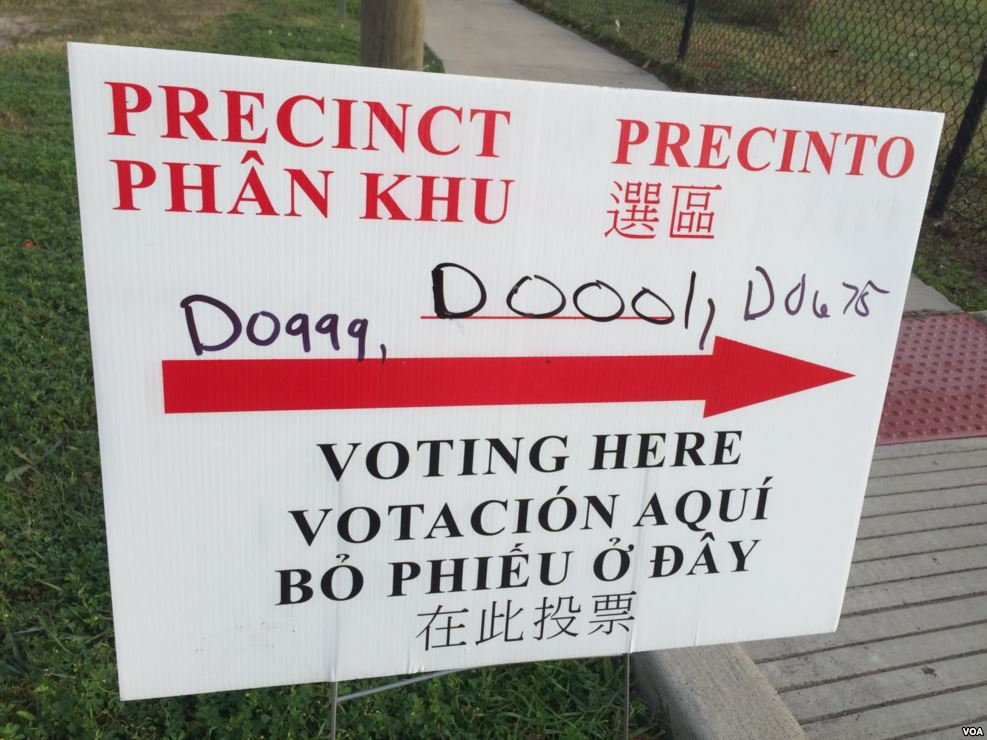
Sign for a polling station in English, Spanish, Vietnamese and Chinese in Houston, Texas, 2016

Super Tuesday is the United States presidential primary election day in February or March when the greatest number of U.S. states hold primary elections and caucuses. Approximately one-third of all delegates to the presidential nominating conventions can be won on Super Tuesday, more than on any other day. The results on Super Tuesday are therefore a strong indicator of the likely eventual presidential nominee of each political party.

The particular states holding primaries on Super Tuesday have varied from year to year because each state selects its election day separate from one another.

Tuesday is the traditional day for elections in the United States. The phrase Super Tuesday has been used to refer to presidential primary elections since at least 1976. It is an unofficial term used by journalists and political pundits.

== Background ==
United States politics are dominated by two major political parties, the Democratic Party and Republican Party, which choose their presidential candidates in nominating conventions attended by delegates from states. State law determines how each party's delegates are chosen in each state by either a primary election or a caucus and on what date those contests are held. State governments or state party organizations choose the date they want for their states' primary or caucus.

With the broadened use of the modern presidential primary system, following the chaotic 1968 Democratic National Convention in Chicago, states have tried to increase their influence in the nomination process. One tactic has been to create geographic blocs to encourage candidates to spend time in a region.

One motivation for the creation of Super Tuesday has been criticism and reform proposals of the current primary system, many of which argue for creating a National Primary or a regional primary, such as the Rotating Regional Primary System adopted by the National Association of Secretaries of State in 1999, among other proposals.

== 1980s ==
=== 1984: Beginnings of Super Tuesday ===
The 1984 primary season had three "Super Tuesdays". Decided on "Super Tuesday III" were delegates from five states: South Dakota, New Mexico, West Virginia, California and New Jersey. The proportional nature of delegate selection meant that Walter Mondale was likely to obtain enough delegates on that day to win the nomination at the 1984 Democratic National Convention, no matter who actually won the states contested. Gary Hart maintained that unpledged superdelegates that had previously announced support for Mondale would shift to his side if he swept the Super Tuesday III primary.

Hart committed a faux pas, insulting New Jersey shortly before the primary day. Campaigning in California, he remarked that while the "bad news" was that he and his wife Lee had to campaign separately, "[t]he good news for her is that she campaigns in California while I campaign in New Jersey." When his wife interjected that she "got to hold a koala bear", Hart replied that "I won't tell you what I got to hold: samples from a toxic waste dump." While Hart won California, he lost New Jersey despite having led in polls by as much as 15 points.

Mondale secured the majority of delegates from the primaries, leading the way for him to take the Democratic presidential nomination. In the 1984 Republican Party primaries, incumbent President Ronald Reagan was the only candidate to secure delegates.

=== 1988: Southern states primary ===
Proposals for holding the presidential primaries of southern states at once started in the 1970s in order to maintain and increase the region's influence in presidential elections. It would allow for a conservative favorite son candidate from the south to receive a lead in delegate totals and produce momentum for the other primaries. Other southern presidential candidates had fared poorly in the initial contests in Iowa and New Hampshire which allowed more liberal candidates to gain the nomination.

Alabama, Florida, and Georgia designated the second Tuesday of March as the date for their presidential primaries and the Southern Legislative Conference lobbied other states to join. 864 Democratic and 564 Republican delegates came from the southern states in the 1988 primary. Frank Fahrenkopf, chair of the Republican National Committee, stated that "Southern Democrats intended Super Tuesday to be a way to moderate their party", but that "the Democrats have handed us a tremendous opportunity to win over the disaffected majority of their party".

Southern politicians formed the Democratic Leadership Council and hoped to have Governor Chuck Robb or Senator Sam Nunn seek the presidential nomination, but both declined. Michael Dukakis, Dick Gephardt, Al Gore and Jesse Jackson campaigned in the Super Tuesday states. Gephardt and Gore were both southerners, Jackson sought the high percentage of black voters in the region, and Dukakis focused on Texas and Florida where he could receive the support of Hispanic and northerners. Jackson won a plurality of the southern delegates with 286 followed by Gore's 259. Seventy percent of Dukakis' 193 delegates from the south came from Florida and Texas, the only southern states he won.

Four hundred and fifty one delegates were selected in the Democratic primary before Super Tuesday. Dukakis held 14.2% of the delegates, Gephardt held 10.4%, Jackson held 6.2%, Gore held 3.8%, and the remaining candidates or uncommitted were 65.4%. After Super Tuesday Dukakis held 27.8% of the 1,638 delegates selected so far, Jackson held 24.2%, Gore held 21.2%, Gephardt held 8.7%, and the remaining candidates and uncommitted held 18.1%.

One hundred and seventy four delegates were selected in the Republican primary before Super Tuesday. George H. W. Bush held 35.1% of these delegates, Bob Dole 34.5%, Kemp 20.1%, and the other candidates 10.4%. After Super Tuesday Bush held 73.5% of the 959 delegates selected so far with Dole holding 17%, Kemp 4.1%, and the remaining candidates 5.4%. Bush's victory in all but one state on Super Tuesday nearly secured him enough delegates to win the Republican presidential nomination. Bush won a majority of the vote in all southern states except for in three states, and received 85.7% of their delegates due to the primaries being winner-take-all. Pat Robertson's campaign was weakened following a defeat in South Carolina and Super Tuesday.

Dukakis and Gore spent $3 million on the Super Tuesday states while Gephardt spent $1.5 million. Jackson was critical of the expensive requirements of running a campaign in all of the states. His campaign spent $447,644 in total for Super Tuesday, but Jackson noted how adequate advertising time in a single station in Dallas for a week would cost around $300,000.

The Southern Legislative Conference reported that in the eight months prior to Super Tuesday, the four Democratic candidates spent an average of 75 days in the south, while the three Republican candidates spent an average of 51 days. Gore spent 121 days in the south. Jackson was the only candidate that spent more time in the south than in Iowa and New Hampshire.

From 1996 to 2004, most of the Southern primaries were held the week after Super Tuesday, on a day dubbed "Southern Tuesday" by news commentators.

1988 Democratic primaries	Michael Dukakis	Al Gore	Jesse Jackson	Dick Gephardt
Number of states won on Super Tuesday	8	6	5	1

== 1990s ==
=== 1992 ===
In 1992, after losing earlier primaries, Democrat Bill Clinton won several Southern primaries on Super Tuesday en route to winning the 1992 Democratic presidential nomination and later the presidency. Incumbent George H. W. Bush faced opposition from Pat Buchanan in the Republican primaries that year.

1992 Democratic primaries	Bill Clinton	Paul Tsongas
Number of states won on Super Tuesday	8	3

=== 1996 ===
In 1996, Super Tuesday was on March 12. Bob Dole swept Super Tuesday en route to his bid for the 1996 Republican presidential nomination. Clinton, the incumbent president, secured all the delegates in the 1996 Democratic primaries.

== 2000s ==
=== 2000 ===
In 2000, Super Tuesday was on March 7. Sixteen states held primaries on Super Tuesday, the largest presidential primary election day in U.S. history up to that point. Approximately 81% of Democratic delegates and 18% of Republican delegates needed to secure nomination were up for grabs. Democrat Al Gore and Republican George W. Bush cemented their nomination bids with Super Tuesday victories, and both went on to win their parties' presidential nominations.

2000 Republican primaries	George W. Bush	John McCain
Number of states won on Super Tuesday	9	4

=== 2004: Mini-Tuesday ===
Seven states held caucuses or primary elections on Mini-Tuesday in 2004. Blue denotes Democratic-only contests (4) and Purple represents states that held elections for both parties (3).

The states participating in primaries or caucuses on March 2, 2004

In 2004, several states moved their presidential contests up to February 3, 2004, in order to increase the relative importance of their election results. Five states held primaries and two held caucuses and the day was eventually nicknamed Mini-Tuesday or Super Tuesday I by pundits. The traditional March Super Tuesday date, March 2, was christened Super Tuesday II, or just "Super Tuesday." The results of Mini-Tuesday had far-reaching implications for the Democratic primaries. The Republican primaries were uncontested as incumbent President George W. Bush was the presumptive nominee.

Democratic primaries	John Kerry	John Edwards	Wesley Clark	Howard Dean	Al Sharpton	Joe Lieberman	Dennis Kucinich
Number of states won on Mini-Tuesday	6	1	1	0	0	0	0
Number of delegates won on Mini-Tuesday	155	56	50	11	1	0	0

=== 2008 ===
Twenty-four states held caucuses or primary elections on Super Tuesday, 2008. Blue denotes Democratic-only contests (3), Red illustrates Republican-only contests (2), and Purple represents states holding elections for both parties (19). Notes: American Samoa (not shown) is Democratic only.

To increase importance of their votes, 24 states with over half the delegates to the national conventions moved to change their primary dates to February 5, 2008, creating the largest "Super Tuesday" to date. Newswriters and political pundits noted that it would dwarf the Super Tuesday primaries in previous cycles. Because of its political magnitude, some pundits have variously dubbed it "Giga Tuesday", "Mega Giga Tuesday", "Tsunami Tuesday" or even "Super Duper Tuesday".

With only four states holding elections on the other Super Tuesday March 4, 2008, one pundit said "Super Tuesday isn't so super."

Four states held caucuses or primary elections on Super Tuesday II, 2008. Purple represents contests for both parties (4).

Potomac primary

Democratic primaries	Barack Obama	Hillary Clinton
Number of states won on Super Tuesday	13	10
Number of delegates won on Super Tuesday	847	834

Republican primaries	John McCain	Mitt Romney	Mike Huckabee	Ron Paul
Number of states won on Super Tuesday	9	7	5	0
Number of delegates won on Super Tuesday	511	176	147	10

== 2010s ==
=== 2012 ===
Super Tuesday states in 2012

Super Tuesday in 2012 took place on March 6, 2012, totaling 419 delegates (18.3% of the total) in 10 states in the Republican primaries. The Democratic primaries were mostly uncontested as incumbent President Barack Obama was the assured nominee.

The impact of Super Tuesday was lessened by Mitt Romney's convincing victories preceding Super Tuesday. Frontrunner Romney was able to increase his lead significantly, with wins in six states and won over half the delegates at stake. Santorum's three wins, and a near-win in Ohio, allowed him to carry on as a candidate for another month.

Republican primaries	Mitt Romney	Rick Santorum	Newt Gingrich	Ron Paul
Number of states won on Super Tuesday	6	3	1	0
Number of delegates won on Super Tuesday (OH 4 unalloc.)	225	89	80	21

=== 2016: Super Tuesday I ===
Super Tuesday by states and territories, 2016

Super Tuesday 2016 (Republican Party, results)

Super Tuesday 2016 (Democratic Party, results)

Super Tuesday in the 2016 presidential election was held on March 1, 2016. This date was dubbed the SEC Primary, since many of the participating states were represented in the U.S. Southeastern Conference for college athletics (five southern states).

The participating states included Alabama, Arkansas, Colorado, Georgia, Massachusetts, Minnesota (with caucuses), Oklahoma, Tennessee, Texas, Vermont, and Virginia. Additionally, Republican caucuses were held in Alaska, North Dakota, and Wyoming. The territory of American Samoa held a Democratic caucus.

The Republican candidates could win about half of the 1,237 delegates needed to secure their party's presidential nomination. The two remaining Democrats were after 880 delegates, roughly one-third of those needed to win. The number of delegates from Texas is much greater than the other states: 155 for Republicans and 252 for Democrats.

The Democratic primaries and caucuses concluded with Hillary Clinton winning Alabama, Arkansas, Georgia, Massachusetts, Tennessee, Texas, and Virginia, and Bernie Sanders winning Colorado, Minnesota, Oklahoma, and Vermont. Clinton received 486 delegates, and Sanders received 321.

The Republican primaries and caucuses concluded with Donald Trump winning Alabama, Arkansas, Georgia, Massachusetts, Tennessee, Vermont, and Virginia; Ted Cruz winning Alaska, Oklahoma, and Texas; and Marco Rubio winning Minnesota. John Kasich and Ben Carson were also in the election, but neither won any states. Results from the North Dakota and Wyoming caucuses were yet to be determined, as their delegates were not required to support the winners of those contests and can freely pledge to their preferred candidate during their respective state party conventions.

Democratic primaries	Hillary Clinton	Bernie Sanders
Number of states won on Super Tuesday	7	4
Number of delegates won on Super Tuesday	486	321

Republican primaries	Donald Trump	Ted Cruz	Marco Rubio	John Kasich	Ben Carson
Number of states won on Super Tuesday	7	3	1	0	0
Number of delegates won on Super Tuesday	256	219	101	21	3

Additionally, several third-party primaries were held on March 1. The Libertarian Party hosted its caucus in Minnesota, which was won by Gary Johnson. The Green Party of the United States hosted two contests, a primary in Massachusetts and a caucus in Minnesota, both of which were won by Jill Stein.

=== 2016: Super Tuesday II ===
Super Tuesday II Democratic results

Super Tuesday II Republican results

March 15, 2016, was dubbed Super Tuesday II, Mega Tuesday, or the Ides of March Primaries. Five states held both Democratic and Republican primaries: Illinois, Florida, North Carolina, Ohio, and Missouri. Republican caucuses were also held in the Northern Marianas Islands. The Republican races were particularly significant as four of these, excepting the North Carolina primary, were the first in the cycle to use winner-takes-all voting systems. Republican contests held prior to March 14 were only permitted to use proportional systems. There were 697 delegates at stake for Democrats and 358 delegates for Republicans.

Some media sources referred to the contests on March 8 as Super Tuesday II, where two states held Democratic contests and four states held Republican contests, and referred to the March 15 contests as Super Tuesday III.

Democratic primaries	Hillary Clinton	Bernie Sanders
Number of states won on Super Tuesday II	5	0
Number of delegates won on Super Tuesday II	347	246

Republican primaries	Donald Trump	John Kasich	Ted Cruz	Marco Rubio
Number of contests won on Super Tuesday II	5	1	0	0
Number of delegates won on Super Tuesday II	229	81	51	6

== 2020s ==
=== 2020 ===
Super Tuesday by states and territories, 2020

Super Tuesday was on March 3, 2020. Alabama, Arkansas, California, Colorado, Maine, Massachusetts, Minnesota, North Carolina, Oklahoma, Tennessee, Texas, Utah, Vermont, and Virginia all held their presidential primaries on that date. American Samoa had its caucus that day. As a territory it did not participate in the general election in November. The Democrats Abroad primary, for Democrats living outside of the United States, started voting on March 3, and concluded on March 10. 1,357, or 34.1%, of the 3,979 pledged delegates to be awarded to the candidates in the Democratic primaries were allotted on Super Tuesday. 1,617 total delegates were available to be awarded to the candidates. This was driven in large part by the two most populous states in the country, California and Texas, allotting 415 and 228 delegates, respectively, on Super Tuesday.

Joe Biden won Alabama, Arkansas, Maine, Massachusetts, Minnesota, North Carolina, Oklahoma, Tennessee, Texas, and Virginia. Bernie Sanders won California, Colorado, Utah, and his home state of Vermont. Michael Bloomberg won American Samoa. Elizabeth Warren and Tulsi Gabbard failed to win any contest.

Democratic primaries	Joe Biden	Bernie Sanders
Number of states won on Super Tuesday	10	4
Number of delegates won on Super Tuesday	726	505

In the Republican primaries, incumbent President Donald Trump defeated challenger Bill Weld in the Super Tuesday Republican primaries. Among the Super Tuesday states, Trump was uncontested in Maine and Minnesota, as both the Maine and Minnesota state Republican parties left Weld off their ballots. The Virginia Republican Party went a step further and decided to cancel its primary altogether and select their delegates directly at its state party convention.

=== 2024 ===
Super Tuesday took place on March 5, 2024. Iowa's Democratic mail-in caucus finished accepting votes on Super Tuesday as well. 865 of the Republican delegates were chosen in these primaries and caucuses, while Democrats chose 1,420.

Super Tuesday winners for the 2024 Republican Party presidential primaries
Donald Trump	Nikki Haley	Ref
Alabama; Alaska; Arkansas; California; Colorado; Maine; Massachusetts; Minnesota; North Carolina; Oklahoma; Tennessee; Texas; Utah; Virginia	Vermont	

Super Tuesday winners for the 2024 Democratic Party presidential primaries
Joe Biden	Jason Palmer	Ref
Alabama; Arkansas; California; Colorado; Iowa; Maine; Massachusetts; Minnesota; North Carolina; Oklahoma; Tennessee; Texas; Utah; Vermont; Virginia	American Samoa (Note: Biden and Palmer both earned 3 delegates, but Palmer won the popular vote.)	

== See also ==
- List of Democratic Party presidential primaries
- List of Republican Party presidential primaries

== Works cited ==
- Hadley, Charles; Stanley, Harold (1989). "Super Tuesday 1988: Regional Results and National Implications". Publius. 19 (3). Oxford University Press: 19–37. JSTOR 3330481.
- Moreland, Laurence; Steed, Robert; Baker, Tod, eds. (1991). The 1988 Presidential Election in the South: Continuity Amidst Change in Southern Party Politics. Praeger Publishers. ISBN 0275931455.

== External link ==
- why do we vote on tuesday?
