= 2024 Texas Republican presidential primary =

- March 5, 2024

161 Republican National Convention delegates

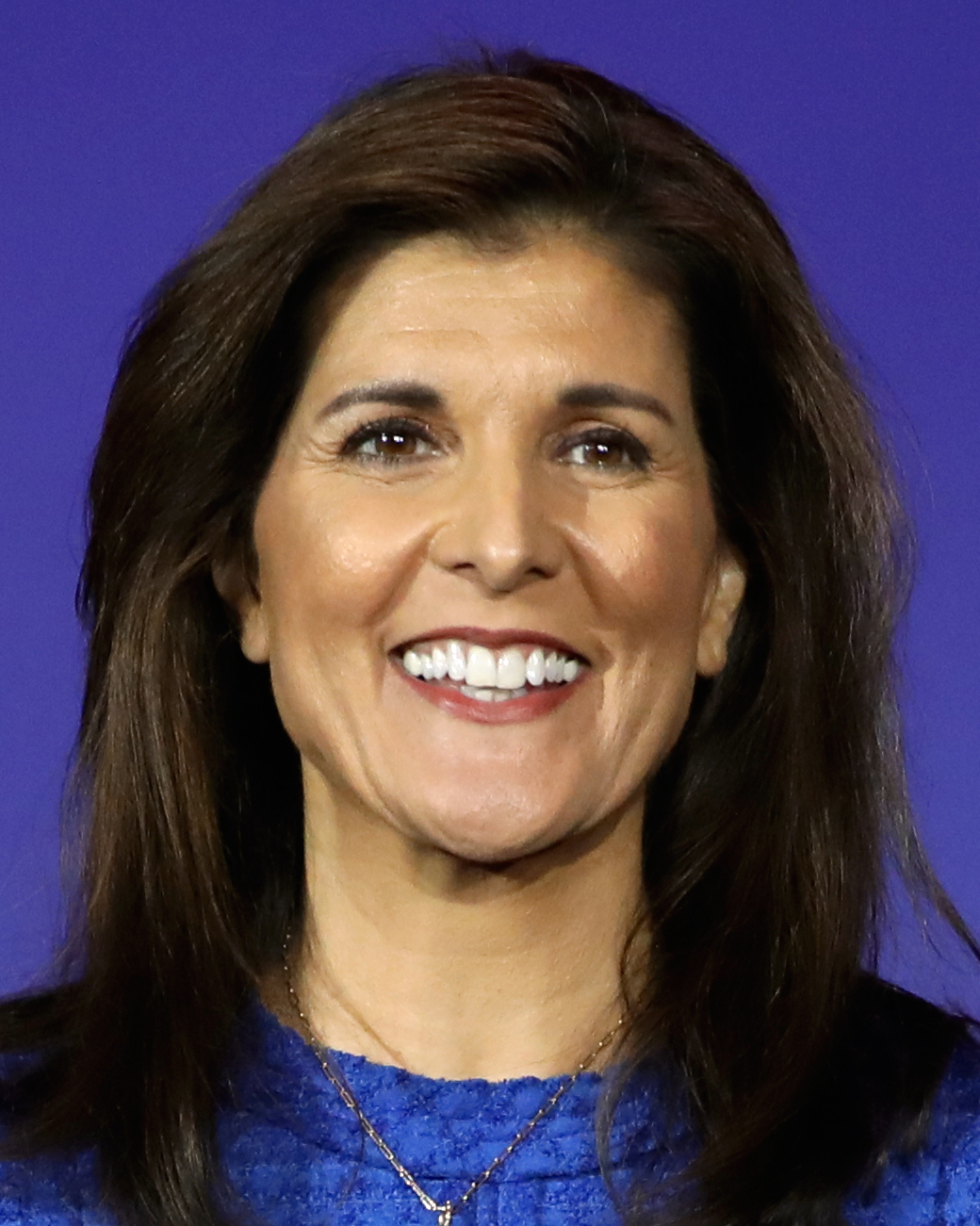
| Candidate | Donald Trump | Nikki Haley |
| Home state | Florida | South Carolina |
| Delegate count | 161 | 0 |
| Popular vote | 1,808,269 | 405,472 |
| Percentage | 77.84% | 17.45% |

Trump
40 – 50%
50 – 60%
60 – 70%
70 – 80%
80 – 90%
>90%
Haley
40 – 50%
50 – 60%
60 – 70%
70 – 80%
80 – 90%
90 – 100%
Ramaswamy
90 – 100%
Uncommitted
90 – 100%
Tie
50%
40-50%
30-40%
No Votes

The 2024 Texas Republican presidential primary was held on March 5, 2024, as part of the Republican Party primaries for the 2024 presidential election. 161 delegates to the 2024 Republican National Convention were allocated on a winner-take-most basis. The contest was held on Super Tuesday alongside primaries in 14 other states. Trump ultimately won all 161 delegates, while winning every county in the state except for Kent County.

== Candidates ==
The filing deadline was December 11, 2023. The following candidates filed:

- Ryan Binkley (withdrew on February 27, 2024)
- Chris Christie (withdrew on January 10, 2024)
- Ron DeSantis (withdrew on January 21, 2024)
- Nikki Haley
- Asa Hutchinson (withdrew on January 16, 2024)
- Vivek Ramaswamy (withdrew on January 15, 2024)
- David Stuckenberg
- Donald Trump
- Uncommitted

== Endorsements ==
Ron DeSantis (withdrawn)

U.S. Representatives

- Chip Roy, TX-21 (2019–present)
- Lamar Smith, TX-21 (1987–2019)

State representative

- Matt Schaefer, District 6 (2013–present)
Nikki Haley

Former U.S. Representatives

- Will Hurd, TX-23 (2015–2021) and former 2024 Republican presidential candidate
- Lamar Smith, TX-21 (1987-2019) (previously endorsed DeSantis)
- Mac Thornberry, TX-13 (1995-2021)

State Senator

- Florence Shapiro, Texas Senate, District 8 (1995–2013)

State Representative

- Kyle Kacal, District 12 (2013–present)
- Joe Straus, Speaker of the Texas House of Representative (2009–2019)

Local officials

- Dee Margo, Mayor of El Paso (2017-2021)
- Mattie Parker, mayor of Fort Worth (2021-Present)
- Betsy Price, mayor of Fort Worth (2011-2021)

Notable individual

- John Hagee, pastor and televangelist
Mike Pence (withdrawn)

Former U.S. Representative

- Jeb Hensarling, TX-05 (2003–2019)
Donald Trump

U.S. Senator

- John Cornyn, (2002–present)
- Ted Cruz, (2013–present); candidate for President in 2016

U.S. Representatives

- Jodey Arrington, TX-19 (2017–present)
- Brian Babin, TX-36 (2015–present)
- Michael C. Burgess, TX-26 (2003–present)
- John Carter, TX-31 (2003–present)
- Monica De La Cruz, TX-15 (2023–present)
- Pat Fallon, TX-04 (2021–present)
- Mayra Flores, TX-34 (2022–2023)
- Tony Gonzales, TX-23 (2021–present)
- Louie Gohmert, TX-01 (2005–2023)
- Lance Gooden, TX-05 (2019–present)
- Wesley Hunt, TX-38 (2023–present)
- Ronny Jackson, TX-13 (2021–present)
- Troy Nehls, TX-22 (2021–present)
- August Pfluger, TX-11 (2021–present)
- Keith Self, TX-03 (2023–present)
- Pete Sessions, TX-17 (2021–present)
- Beth Van Duyne, TX-24 (2021–present)
- Randy Weber, TX-14 (2013–present)
- Roger Williams, TX-25 (2013–present)

State executive officials

- Greg Abbott, Governor of Texas (2015–present)
- Dawn Buckingham, Land Commissioner (2023–present)
- Sid Miller, Agriculture Commissioner (2015–present)
- Dan Patrick, Lieutenant Governor (2015–present)
- Ken Paxton, Attorney General (2015–present)

State representative

- Charles Anderson, District 56 (2005–present)

== Maps ==
Endorsements by incumbent Republicans in the Texas House of Representatives. Endorsed Donald Trump (4) Endorsed Ron DeSantis (1) (withdrawn) Endorsed Nikki Haley (1) No endorsement (80)

== Polling ==
| Poll source | Date(s) administered | Sample size (Note: Key: A – all adults RV – registered voters LV – likely voters V – unclear) | Margin of error | Doug Burgum | Chris Christie | Ron DeSantis | Nikki Haley | Asa Hutchinson | Mike Pence | Vivek Ramaswamy | Tim Scott | Donald Trump | Other | Undecided |
|---|---|---|---|---|---|---|---|---|---|---|---|---|---|---|
| YouGov (Note: Poll sponsored by the Texas Political Project at the University of Texas) | Dec 1–10, 2023 | 552 (RV) | ± 4.17% | 1% | 2% | 12% | 9% | – | – | 4% | – | 65% | 2% (Note: "Anyone/Any of them" & "No one/None of them" with 1%; "Someone else" with 0%) | 6% |
| Morning Consult | Nov 1–30, 2023 | 3,064 (LV) | – | 1% | 2% | 12% | 7% | 1% | – | 7% | 1% | 69% | – | – |
| CWS Research (Note: Poll sponsored by Defend Texas Liberty PAC) | Nov 20–22, 2023 | 458 (LV) | ± 4.579% | 0% | 3% | 11% | 11% | – | – | 2% | – | 61% | – | 11% |
| CWS Research | Nov 20–22, 2023 | 458 (LV) | ± 4.579% | – | – | 22% | – | – | – | – | – | 63% | – | 14% |
| CWS Research | Nov 20–22, 2023 | 458 (LV) | ± 4.579% | – | – | – | 20% | – | – | – | – | 70% | – | 10% |
| Morning Consult | Oct 1–31, 2023 | 3,187 (LV) | – | 0% | 2% | 11% | 6% | 0% | 5% | 7% | 2% | 66% | 0% (Note: Will Hurd with 0%) | 1% |
| YouGov | Oct 5–17, 2023 | 568 (RV) | ± 4.11% | 0% | 1% | 13% | 7% | 1% | 3% | 3% | 1% | 62% | 3% (Note: Will Hurd, "Someone else" & "Anyone" with 1%; "No one" with 0%) | 5% |
| CWS Research | October 5–9, 2023 | 418 (LV) | ± 4.793% | 0% | 1% | 9% | 11% | N/A | 2% | 5% | 1% | 58% | – | 13% |
| CWS Research | October 5–9, 2023 | 418 (LV) | ± 4.793% | – | – | 24% | – | – | – | – | – | 59% | – | 17% |
| Morning Consult | Sep 1–30, 2023 | 3,099 (LV) | – | 1% | 1% | 13% | 4% | 1% | 5% | 9% | 2% | 62% | 0% (Note: Will Hurd with 0%) | 2% |
| CWS Research | Sep 1–4, 2023 | 406 (LV) | ± 4.864% | 0% | 2% | 10% | 5% | 1% | 5% | 3% | 1% | 61% | 2% (Note: Will Hurd with 2%) | 10% |
| CWS Research | Sep 1–4, 2023 | 406 (LV) | ± 4.864% | – | – | 24% | – | – | – | – | – | 62% | – | 14% |
| Morning Consult | Aug 1–31, 2023 | 3,070 (LV) | – | 0% | 2% | 12% | 3% | 0% | 7% | 11% | 3% | 61% | 1% (Note: Will Hurd with 1%) | – |
| CWS Research | Jul 30–31, 2023 | 606 (LV) | ± 3.981% | 0% | 4% | 13% | 3% | 1% | 4% | 4% | 5% | 48% | 3% (Note: Will Hurd with 3%) | 15% |
| CWS Research | Jul 30–31, 2023 | 606 (LV) | ± 3.981% | – | – | 29% | – | – | – | – | – | 53% | – | 19% |
| Morning Consult | July 1–31, 2023 | 3,156 (LV) | – | 0% | 1% | 15% | 3% | 0% | 8% | 9% | 4% | 59% | 0% (Note: Will Hurd and Francis Suarez with 0%) | 1% |
| CWS Research | Jun 28–30, 2023 | 764 (LV) | ± 3.546% | 0% | 3% | 19% | 4% | 1% | 5% | 2% | 3% | 51% | 3% (Note: Will Hurd with 3%) | 10% |
| CWS Research | Jun 28–30, 2023 | 764 (LV) | ± 3.546% | – | – | 32% | – | – | – | – | – | 53% | – | 15% |
| Morning Consult | June 1–30, 2023 | 2,929 (LV) | – | 0% | 1% | 18% | 3% | 1% | 7% | 4% | 3% | 59% | 2% (Note: Greg Abbott with 2%; Liz Cheney, Kristi Noem, Will Hurd, and Francis Suarez with 0%) | 2% |
| Morning Consult | May 1–31, 2023 | 2,829 (LV) | – | – | – | 19% | 4% | 0% | 5% | 3% | 2% | 58% | 7% (Note: Greg Abbott with 6%; Liz Cheney with 1%; Kristi Noem and Glenn Youngkin with 0%) | 2% |
| CWS Research | May 26–30, 2023 | 1,024 (LV) | ± 3.07% | – | – | 23% | 3% | 2% | 4% | 2% | 3% | 47% | 4% (Note: Ted Cruz with 4%) | 13% |
| CWS Research | May 26–30, 2023 | 1,024 (LV) | ± 3.07% | – | – | 33% | – | – | – | – | – | 51% | – | 16% |
| Texas Hispanic Policy Foundation | May 8–17, 2023 | 1,000 (RV) | ± 2.9% | – | – | 36% | – | – | – | – | – | 57% | 2% (Note: "Would not vote" with 2%) | 5% |
| CWS Research | Apr 29 – May 1, 2023 | 699 (LV) | ± 3.7% | – | – | 16% | 5% | 0% | 3% | 3% | 1% | 54% | 4% (Note: Ted Cruz with 4%) | 15% |
| Morning Consult | Apr 1–30, 2023 | 2,736 (LV) | – | – | – | 20% | 3% | 0% | 6% | 2% | 1% | 57% | 9% (Note: Greg Abbott with 7%; Liz Cheney with 2%; Kristi Noem, Mike Pompeo, and Glenn Youngkin with 0%) | 2% |
| CWS Research | Mar 30 – Apr 2, 2023 | 1,067 (LV) | ± 3.0% | – | – | 20% | 4% | – | 5% | 2% | 1% | 52% | 5% (Note: Ted Cruz with 3%; Mike Pompeo with 2%) | 12% |
| Morning Consult | Mar 1–31, 2023 | 2,629 (LV) | – | – | – | 24% | 4% | – | 7% | 0% | 1% | 53% | 11% (Note: Greg Abbott with 7%; Liz Cheney with 2%; Kristi Noem and Mike Pompeo with 1%; Glenn Youngkin with 0%) | – |
| CWS Research | Feb 28 – Mar 2, 2023 | 879 (LV) | ± 3.3% | – | – | 27% | 5% | – | 4% | 2% | 1% | 43% | 5% (Note: Ted Cruz with 4%; Mike Pompeo with 1%) | 13% |
| Morning Consult | Feb 1–28, 2023 | 2,376 (LV) | – | – | – | 27% | 3% | – | 6% | 0% | 1% | 51% | 12% (Note: Greg Abbott with 7%; Liz Cheney with 2%; Ted Cruz, Kristi Noem, and Mike Pompeo with 1%; Glenn Youngkin with 0%) | – |
| Morning Consult | Jan 1–31, 2023 | 3,187 (LV) | – | – | – | 28% | 2% | – | 9% | – | 0% | 48% | 13% (Note: Greg Abbott with 7%; Ted Cruz with 3%; Liz Cheney with 2%; Mike Pompeo with 1%; Kristi Noem & Glenn Youngkin with 0%) | – |
| Morning Consult | Dec 1–31, 2022 | 1,871 (LV) | – | – | – | 30% | 2% | – | 8% | – | 0% | 45% | 15% (Note: Greg Abbott with 7%; Ted Cruz with 4%; Liz Cheney with 3%; Mike Pompeo with 1%; Kristi Noem & Glenn Youngkin with 0%) | – |
| CWS Research | Dec 19–21, 2022 | 1,051 (LV) | ± 3.0% | – | – | 36% | 4% | – | 4% | – | 1% | 37% | 7% (Note: Ted Cruz with 4%; Mike Pompeo with 2%) | 11% |
| CWS Research | Nov 27–28, 2022 | 860 (LV) | ± 3.3% | – | – | 34% | 4% | – | 5% | – | 1% | 37% | 5% (Note: Ted Cruz with 3%; Mike Pompeo with 2%) | 13% |
| CWS Research (Note: Poll sponsored by the Republican Party of Texas) | Nov 12–13, 2022 | 1,099 (LV) | ± 3.0% | – | – | 43% | 4% | – | 5% | – | 1% | 32% | 1% (Note: Mike Pompeo with 1%) | 14% |
| CWS Research | Oct 19–23, 2022 | 823 (RV) | – | – | – | 29% | 3% | – | 4% | – | – | 46% | 7% (Note: Greg Abbott with 4%; Ted Cruz with 3%) | 11% |
| Echelon Insights | Aug 31 – Sep 7, 2022 | 378 (LV) | ± 4.4% | – | – | 37% | – | – | – | – | – | 53% | – | 10% |
| CWS Research | Aug 9–11, 2022 | 1,581 (RV) | ± 2.5% | – | – | 21% | 5% | – | 6% | – | – | 51% | 7% (Note: Greg Abbott with 4%; Ted Cruz with 3%) | 10% |
| CWS Research | Jul 9–10, 2022 | 1,918 (RV) | ± 2.2% | – | – | 26% | 5% | – | 6% | – | – | 45% | 20% (Note: Ted Cruz with 12%; Greg Abbott with 8%; Glen Youngkin with 0%) | 9% |
| CWS Research | Jun 7–8, 2022 | 665 (RV) | ± 3.8% | – | – | 26% | 4% | – | 5% | – | – | 49% | 8% (Note: Ted Cruz with 4%; Greg Abbott and Marco Rubio with 2%) | 8% |
| CWS Research | May 4–10, 2022 | 992 (LV) | ± 3.1% | – | – | 28% | 7% | – | – | – | – | 44% | 13% (Note: Ted Cruz with 6%; Greg Abbott with 5%; Kristi Noem with 2%) | 8% |
| CWS Research | Mar 29 – Apr 1, 2022 | 678 (LV) | ± 3.8% | – | – | 20% | 10% | – | – | – | – | 46% | 16% (Note: Ted Cruz with 8%; Greg Abbott with 6%; Kristi Noem with 2%) | 8% |

Polls without Donald Trump

| Poll source | Date(s) administered | Sample size | Margin of error | Greg Abbott | Ted Cruz | Ron DeSantis | Nikki Haley | Mike Pence | Mike Pompeo | Other | Undecided |
|---|---|---|---|---|---|---|---|---|---|---|---|
| CWS Research | Nov 12–13, 2022 | 1,099 (LV) | ± 3.0% | – | – | 66% | 5% | 8% | 3% | 2% (Note: Tim Scott with 2%) | 16% |
| CWS Research | Oct 19–23, 2022 | 823 (RV) | – | 8% | 8% | 64% | 5% | 4% | – | – | 11% |
| CWS Research | Aug 9–11, 2022 | 1,581 (RV) | ± 2.5% | 8% | 10% | 58% | 7% | 8% | – | – | 9% |
| CWS Research | Jul 9–10, 2022 | 1,918 (RV) | ± 2.2% | 4% | 5% | 56% | 5% | 8% | – | 1% (Note: Glen Youngkin with 1%) | 10% |
| CWS Research | Jun 7–8, 2022 | 665 (RV) | ± 3.8% | 7% | 11% | 57% | 3% | 8% | – | 3% (Note: Marco Rubio with 3%) | 11% |
| CWS Research | May 4–10, 2022 | 992 (LV) | ± 3.1% | 10% | 14% | 56% | 9% | – | – | 3% (Note: Kristi Noem with 3%) | 8% |
| CWS Research | Mar 29 – Apr 1, 2022 | 678 (LV) | ± 3.8% | 10% | 19% | 48% | 13% | – | – | 3% | 7% |
| CWS Research | Feb 5–7, 2022 | 715 (LV) | – | 13% | – | 46% | – | – | – | 18% | 23% |

== Results ==
Texas Republican primary, March 5, 2024
| Candidate | Votes | Percentage | Actual delegate count | | |
| Candidate | Votes | Percentage | Bound | Unbound | Total |
|---|---|---|---|---|---|
| Donald Trump | 1,808,269 | 77.84% | 161 | | 161 |
| Nikki Haley | 405,472 | 17.45% | | | |
| Uncommitted | 45,568 | 1.96% | | | |
| Ron DeSantis (withdrawn) | 36,302 | 1.56% | | | |
| Vivek Ramaswamy (withdrawn) | 10,582 | 0.46% | | | |
| Chris Christie (withdrawn) | 8,938 | 0.38% | | | |
| Asa Hutchinson (withdrawn) | 2,964 | 0.13% | | | |
| Ryan Binkley (withdrawn) | 2,585 | 0.11% | | | |
| David Stuckenberg | 2,339 | 0.10% | | | |
| Total: | 2,323,019 | 100.00% | 161 | | 161 |

== See also ==
- 2024 Republican Party presidential primaries
- 2024 Texas Democratic presidential primary
- 2024 United States presidential election
- 2024 United States presidential election in Texas
- 2024 United States elections
- 2024 Texas elections

== Notes ==
Partisan clients
