= 2024 California Republican presidential primary =

- March 5, 2024

169 Republican National Convention delegates

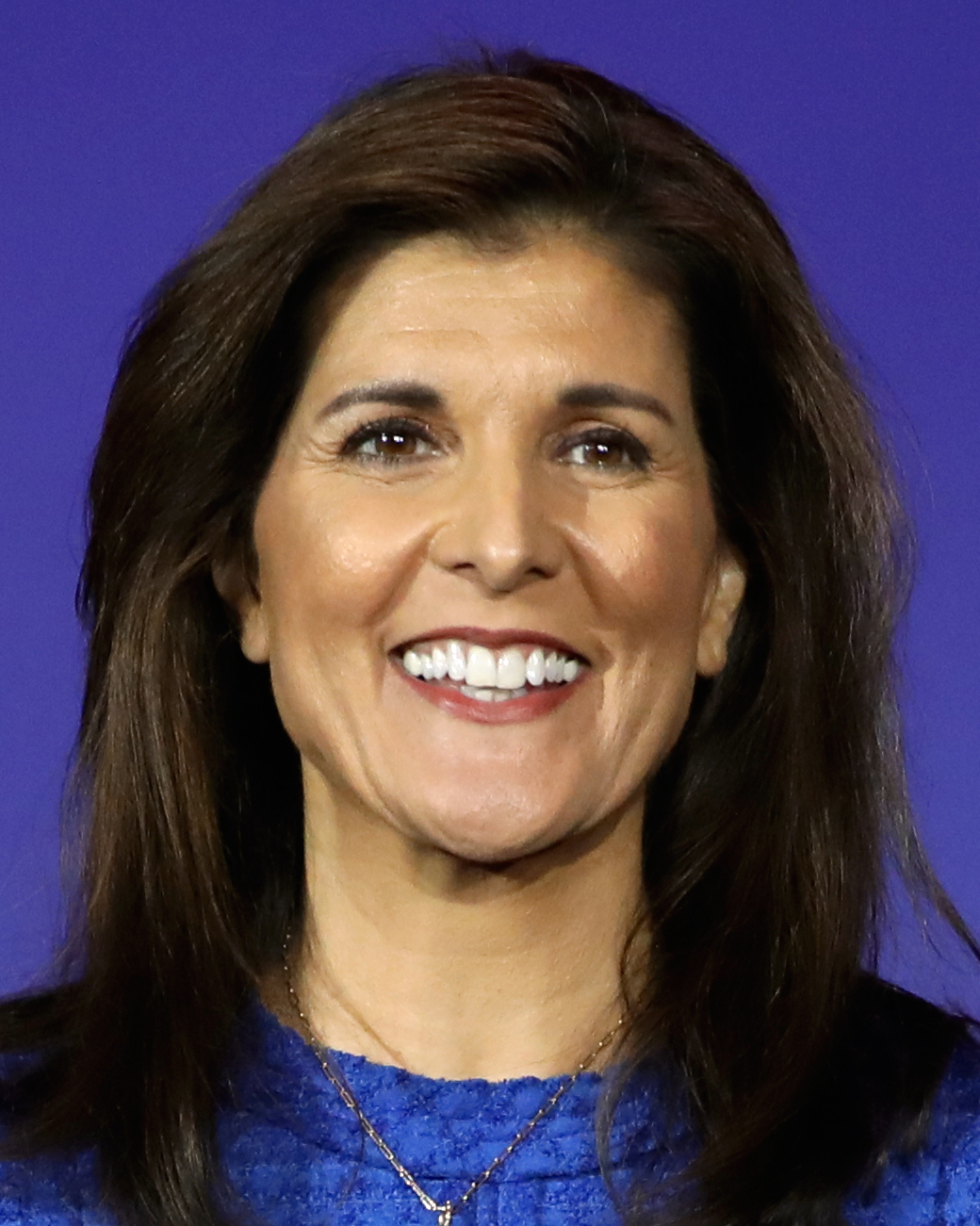
Candidate	Donald Trump	Nikki Haley
Home state	Florida	South Carolina
Delegate count	169	0
Popular vote	1,962,905	431,876
Percentage	79.25%	17.44%

Trump
50 – 60%
60 – 70%
70 – 80%
80 – 90%

The 2024 California Republican presidential primary was held on March 5, 2024, as part of the Republican Party primaries for the 2024 presidential election. 169 delegates to the 2024 Republican National Convention were allocated on a winner-take-most basis. The contest was held on Super Tuesday alongside primaries in 14 other states.

== Background ==
=== Procedure ===
If a candidate gets over 50% of the total statewide vote, they are awarded all of the state's delegates. Otherwise, the delegates are allocated proportionally.

== Candidates ==
The following candidates were certified:

- Nikki Haley
- David Stuckenberg
- Rachel Swift
- Donald Trump
- Ryan Binkley (withdrawn)
- Chris Christie (withdrawn)
- Ron DeSantis (withdrawn)
- Asa Hutchinson (withdrawn)
- Vivek Ramaswamy (withdrawn)

== Campaign ==
=== Events ===
On June 19, 2023, Ron DeSantis held a private breakfast event at the Del Paso Country Club in Sacramento, California, hosting business leaders in the region to raise funds for his campaign. It was his first campaign stop in California since his administration in Florida transported migrants from the border with Mexico to Sacramento. The event was attended by state legislators Joe Patterson and Tom Lackey, who endorsed DeSantis after the event.

The California Republican Party held its annual fall convention from September 29 to October 1, 2023, in Anaheim. Featured speakers included DeSantis, Donald Trump, Tim Scott, and Vivek Ramaswamy. Trump's speech included calling on police to enact violent retribution on criminals, stating he would "immediately stop all of the pillaging and theft."

=== Debate ===
The second Republican primary debate was held at the Ronald Reagan Presidential Library in Simi Valley, California, on September 27, 2023. It was hosted by Fox Business, Rumble, and Univision, and moderated by Stuart Varney, Dana Perino, and Ilia Calderón. Seven of the eight candidates who attended the first debate were present: Doug Burgum, Chris Christie, Ron DeSantis, Nikki Haley, Mike Pence, Vivek Ramaswamy, and Tim Scott.

== Endorsements ==
Ron DeSantis (withdrawn)

U.S. representatives

- Tom McClintock, CA-04 (2009–2023), CA-05 (2023–present)
- Frank Riggs, CA-01 (1991–1993, 1995–1999)

State assemblymen

- Tom Lackey, District 34 (2014–present)
- Joe Patterson, District 5 (2022–present)
Donald Trump

U.S. representatives

- Connie Conway, CA-22 (2022–2023)
- Darrell Issa, CA-48 (2023–present, 2001–2003), CA-50 (2021–2023) and CA-49 (2003–2019)
- Doug LaMalfa, CA-01 (2013–present)
- Kevin McCarthy, CA-22 (2007–2013), CA-23 (2013–2023), CA-20 (2023), and speaker of the United States House of Representatives (2023)
- Jay Obernolte, CA-23 (2023–present) and CA-8 (2021–2023)
- Michelle Steel, CA-45 (2023–present) and CA-48 (2021–2023)

Individuals

- Scott Adams, creator of Dilbert
- Robert Davi, actor
- John Dolmayan, System of a Down drummer
- Dinesh D'Souza, author and filmmaker
- Larry Elder, political commentator, candidate for governor in 2021 and withdrawn candidate for president in 2024
- Caitlyn Jenner, transgender Olympic gold medalist in the decathlon
- Antonio Sabàto Jr., actor
- Jon Voight, actor
Nikki Haley
- John H. Cox, Businessman, candidate for governor in 2018

== Polling ==
Aggregate polls

Source of poll aggregation	Dates administered	Dates updated	Nikki Haley	Donald Trump	Other/ Undecided (Note: Calculated by taking the difference of 100% and all other candidates combined.)	Margin
FiveThirtyEight	through February 4, 2024	February 10, 2024	19.0%	73.1%	7.9%	Trump +54.1

Poll source	Date(s) administered	Sample size (Note: Key: A – all adults RV – registered voters LV – likely voters V – unclear)	Margin of error	Chris Christie	Ron DeSantis	Larry Elder	Nikki Haley	Asa Hutchinson	Mike Pence	Vivek Ramaswamy	Tim Scott	Donald Trump	Other	Undecided
Morning Consult	Nov 1–30, 2023	2,347 (LV)	–	2%	10%	–	8%	0%	–	7%	–	71%	1% (Note: Burgum at 1%)	–
Public Policy Institute of California	Nov 9–16, 2023	276 (LV)	–	5%	12%	–	13%	0%	–	2%	2%	56%	1% (Note: Kristi Noem at 1%; Perry Johnson at 0% and Glenn Youngkin at 0%)	9%
Emerson College	Nov 11–14, 2023	331 (LV)	–	4%	11%	-	5%	2%	–	3%	-	63%	1% (Note: Doug Burgum with 1%)	11%
UC Berkeley IGS	Oct 24–30, 2023	1,234 (LV)	± 4.0%	2%	12%	1%	9%	–	–	3%	1%	57%	5%	11%
Public Policy Institute of California	Oct 3–19, 2023	316 (LV)	–	4%	12%	0%	9%	0%	6%	5%	3%	53%	5% (Note: "Someone else" with 4%; Glenn Youngkin with 1%; Doug Burgum, Will Hurd, Perry Johnson, Kristi Noem & "Would not vote" with 0%)	1%
Data Viewpoint	October 1, 2023	533 (RV)	± 4.3%	5.5%	17.5%	–	15.2%	<1%	3.0%	3.6%	2.9%	49.8%	1.7% (Note: Doug Burgum with 1.7%; Glenn Youngkin with <1%)	–
Public Policy Institute of California	Aug 25 – Sep 5, 2023	294 (LV)	–	–	14%	–	7%	–	7%	–	–	48%	21% (Note: "Other candidates" with 16%; Liz Cheney with 5%)	1%
California's Choice	Aug 27–29, 2023	750 (LV)	–	4.8%	21.6%	–	15.6%	0.5%	4.4%	9.6%	0.8%	43.4%	2.6%	–
UC Berkeley IGS	Aug 24–29, 2023	1,175 (LV)	± 4.0%	3%	16%	1%	7%	–	3%	4%	2%	55%	–	9%
Public Policy Institute of California	Jun 7–29, 2023	267 (LV)	–	3%	24%	–	3%	–	6%	1%	5%	50%	7% (Note: Liz Cheney with 3%; Kristi Noem and "Someone else" with 2%)	1%
Emerson College	Jun 4–7, 2023	329 (LV)	± 2.9%	2%	19%	–	6%	–	10%	2%	4%	53%	7% (Note: Doug Burgum and Chris Sununu with 1%)	–
Public Policy Institute of California	May 17–24, 2023	295 (LV)	± 7%	1%	21%	–	3%	–	10%	1%	2%	50%	11% (Note: Liz Cheney with 7%; Kristi Noem with 2%; Chris Sununu with 1%)	2%
UC Berkeley IGS	May 17–22, 2023	1,835 (RV)	± 3.5%	1%	26%	0%	3%	0%	4%	2%	1%	44%	6% (Note: Liz Cheney with 4%; Kristi Noem, Chris Sununu with 1%; Perry Johnson and John Bolton with 0%)	13%
UC Berkeley IGS	Feb 14–20, 2023	1,755 (RV)	± 3.5%	–	37%	–	7%	–	3%	–	1%	29%	8% (Note: Liz Cheney with 4%; Kristi Noem and Mike Pompeo with 2%; Ted Cruz with 1%; Chris Sununu and Glenn Youngkin with 0%)	10%
UC Berkeley IGS	Feb 14–20, 2023	1,755 (RV)	± 3.5%	–	50%	–	–	–	–	–	–	33%	6% (Note: Neither with 6%)	11%
UC Berkeley IGS	Aug 9–15, 2022	9,254 (RV)	± 3.0%	0%	27%	–	3%	–	7%	–	0%	38%	10% (Note: Ted Cruz and Mike Pompeo with 2%; Marco Rubio and Larry Hogan with 1%; Tom Cotton, and Glenn Youngkin with 0%)	14%
UC Berkeley IGS	Aug 9–15, 2022	9,254 (RV)	± 3.0%	0%	53%	–	4%	–	9%	–	1%	–	15% (Note: Mike Pompeo with 4%; Ted Cruz with 3%; Marco Rubio with 2%; Larry Hogan with 1%; Tom Cotton and Glenn Youngkin with 0%)	17%

== Results ==
California Republican primary, March 5, 2024
Candidate	Votes	Percentage	Actual delegate count		
Candidate	Votes	Percentage	Bound	Unbound	Total
Donald Trump	1,962,905	79.25%	169	0	169
Nikki Haley	431,876	17.44%	0	0	0
Ron DeSantis (withdrawn)	35,717	1.44%	0	0	0
Chris Christie (withdrawn)	20,210	0.82%	0	0	0
Vivek Ramaswamy (withdrawn)	11,113	0.45%	0	0	0
Rachel Swift	4,253	0.17%	0	0	0
David Stuckenberg	3,909	0.16%	0	0	0
Ryan Binkley (withdrawn)	3,577	0.14%	0	0	0
Asa Hutchinson (withdrawn)	3,336	0.13%	0	0	0
Total:	2,476,896	100.00%	169	0	169

== See also ==
- 2024 Republican Party presidential primaries
- 2024 California Democratic presidential primary
- 2024 United States presidential election
- 2024 United States presidential election in California
- 2024 United States elections
