= 2024 North Dakota Democratic presidential primary =

- March 30, 2024

17 delegates (13 pledged, 4 unpledged) to the Democratic National Convention

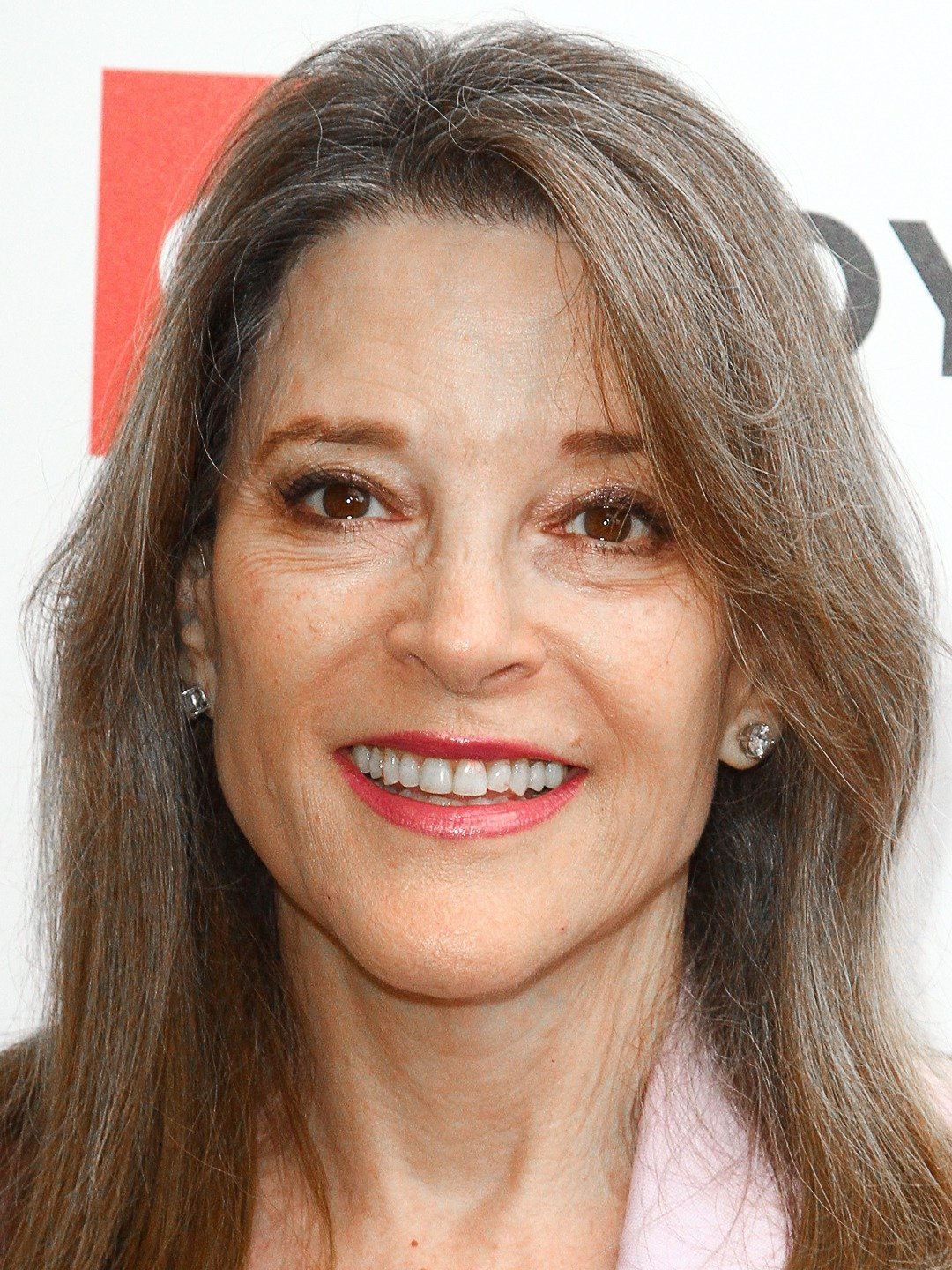
Candidate	Joe Biden	Marianne Williamson
Home state	Delaware	Washington, D.C.
Delegate count	13	0
Popular vote	840	31
Percentage	92.4%	3.4%
Senate district results
Biden
60 – 70%
70 – 80%
80 – 90%
≥90%
No vote

The 2024 North Dakota Democratic presidential primary took place from late February to March 30, 2024 as mail-in primary, as part of the Democratic Party primaries for the 2024 presidential election. 13 delegates to the Democratic National Convention were allocated in the party-run open primary, with 4 additional unpledged delegates.

Voting was organised almost entirely by mail, with in-person voting offered on reservations, and in Fargo, Bismarck, and Grand Forks. Ballots had to be received by noon on March 30.

President Joe Biden won all delegates with little opposition and little turn-out, as seven other candidates were below 4% of the vote.

== Candidates ==
Eight candidates made the ballot:

- Joe Biden
- Eban Cambridge
- Stephen Lyons (withdrawn)
- Jason Palmer
- Armando Perez-Serrato
- Dean Phillips (withdrawn)
- Cenk Uygur (withdrawn)
- Marianne Williamson

== Results ==
North Dakota Democratic primary, March 30, 2024
Candidate	Votes	%	Delegates
Joe Biden (incumbent)	840	92.41	13
Marianne Williamson	31	3.41	0
Dean Phillips (withdrawn)	16	1.76	0
Cenk Uygur (withdrawn)	13	1.43	0
Eban Cambridge	4	0.44	0
Stephen Lyons (withdrawn)	3	0.33	0
Jason Palmer	2	0.22	0
Armando Perez-Serrato	0	0.00	0
Total	909	100%	13

== See also ==
- 2024 North Dakota Republican presidential caucuses
- 2024 Democratic Party presidential primaries
- 2024 United States presidential election
- 2024 United States presidential election in North Dakota
- 2024 United States elections
