= 2024 Nevada Democratic presidential primary =

- February 6, 2024

49 delegates (36 pledged, 13 unpledged) to the Democratic National Convention

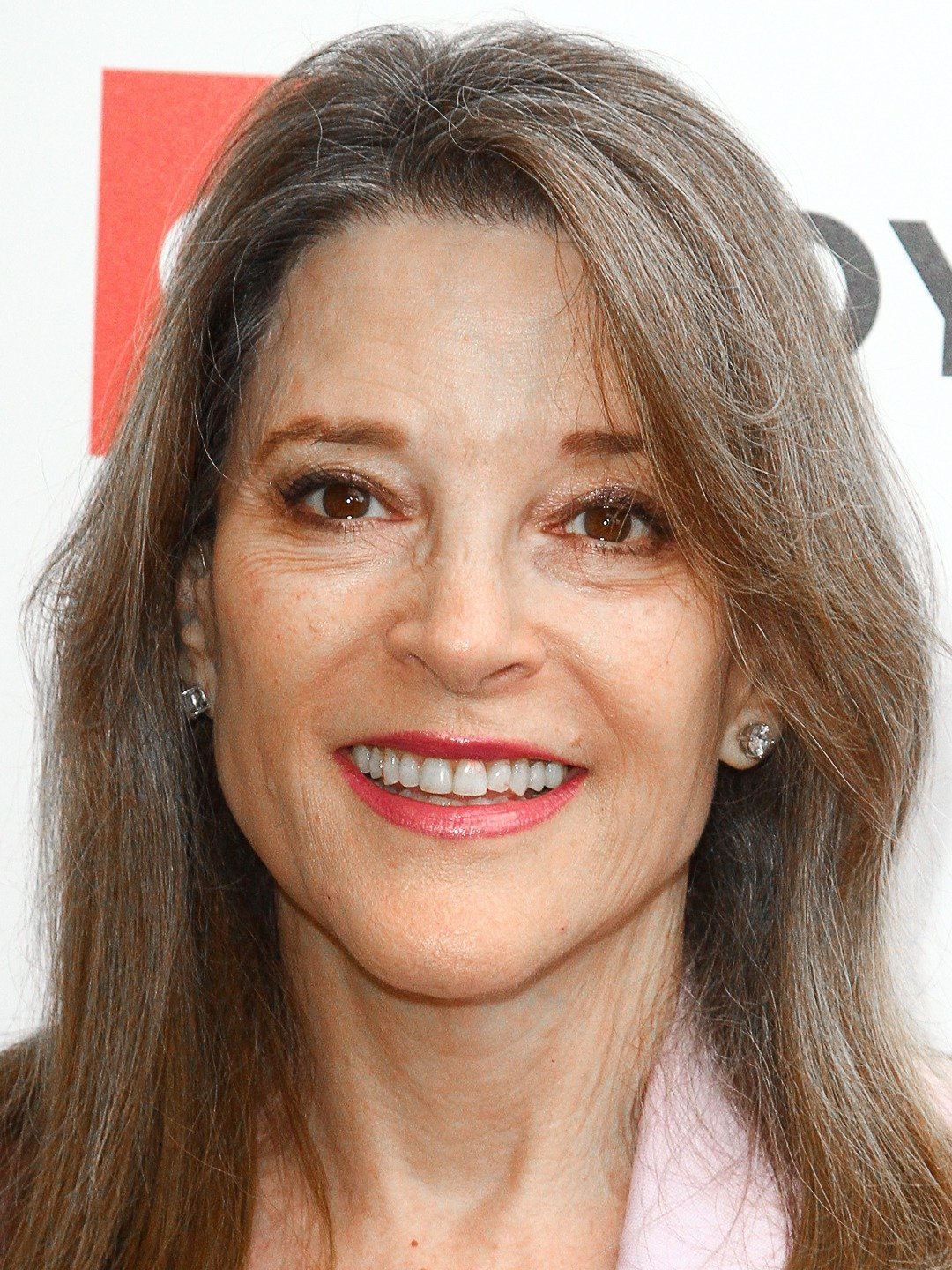
Candidate	Joe Biden	None of These Candidates	Marianne Williamson
Home state	Delaware	–	Washington, D.C.
Delegate count	36	–	0
Popular vote	119,758	7,448	4,101
Percentage	89.3%	5.6%	3.1%
Results by county
Biden
60–70%
70–80%
80–90%
>90%

The 2024 Nevada Democratic presidential primary was held on February 6, 2024, as part of the Democratic Party primaries for the 2024 presidential election. 36 delegates to the Democratic National Convention were allocated, with 13 additional unpledged delegates. The binding Republican caucus was held two days later, following a boycott of the new state-run primary.

President Joe Biden won with 89% and received all 36 delegates, while the second most votes fell to the option None of These Candidates with over 5%.

== Scheduling ==
Nevada changed from holding caucuses to a state primary for the first time, in accordance with Democratic state parties nationwide abolishing caucuses and following complicated and chaotic experiences from the Democratic caucuses in 2020. Governor Steve Sisolak signed the creation of a state-run presidential primary for both parties in 2021, but only the Democratic party made use of it.

Under the Democratic Party's 2024 calendar that was released in February 2023, Nevada's open primary was scheduled to be held concurrently with New Hampshire's as the second contests in the primaries, following the South Carolina primary on February 3, which was for the first time awarded "first in the nation" status. However, New Hampshire set its date for January 23, 2024, in accordance with its state law which requires that New Hampshire hold the nation's first primary.

== Candidates ==
The filing deadline for the Nevada primary was on October 16, 2023. The office of the Secretary of State of Nevada published the list of qualified Democratic candidates on October 20:

- Joe Biden
- Gabriel Cornejo
- Superpayaseria Crystalroc
- Brent Foutz
- John Haywood
- Stephen Alan Leon
- Frankie Lozada
- Stephen Lyons
- Jason Palmer
- Armando Perez-Serrato
- Donald Picard
- Mark R. Prascak
- Marianne Williamson

As on any state election ballot in Nevada, the ballot option None of These Candidates was also included.

=== Failed to make ballot ===
- Dean Phillips (missed filing deadline)
- Cenk Uygur (ruled ineligible due to not being a natural-born citizen)

== Endorsements ==
Joe Biden

U.S. senators

- Jacky Rosen, Nevada (2019–present)

U.S. representatives

- Dina Titus, NV-01 (2009–2011, 2013–present)

Statewide officials

- Steve Sisolak, governor of Nevada (2019–2023)

State legislators

- Daniele Monroe-Moreno, speaker pro tempore of the Nevada Assembly (2023–present) from the 1st district (2016–present)

Political parties

- Nevada Democratic Party

== Results ==
2024 Nevada Democratic primary
Candidate	Votes	%	Delegates
Joe Biden (incumbent)	119,758	89.31	36
Marianne Williamson	4,101	3.06	0
Gabriel Cornejo	811	0.60	0
Jason Palmer	530	0.40	0
Frankie Lozada	315	0.23	0
Armando Perez-Serrato	264	0.20	0
John Haywood	241	0.18	0
Stephen Lyons	147	0.11	0
Superpayaseria Crystalroc	133	0.10	0
Donald Picard	124	0.09	0
Brent Foutz	93	0.07	0
Stephen Alan Leon	89	0.07	0
Mark R. Prascak	33	0.02	0
None of These Candidates	7,448	5.55	—
Total	134,087	100%	36

== See also ==
- 2024 Nevada Republican presidential nominating contests
- 2024 Democratic Party presidential primaries
- 2024 United States presidential election
- 2024 United States presidential election in Nevada
- 2024 United States elections
