= 2024 Texas Democratic presidential primary =

- March 5, 2024

272 delegates (244 pledged, 28 unpledged) to the Democratic National Convention

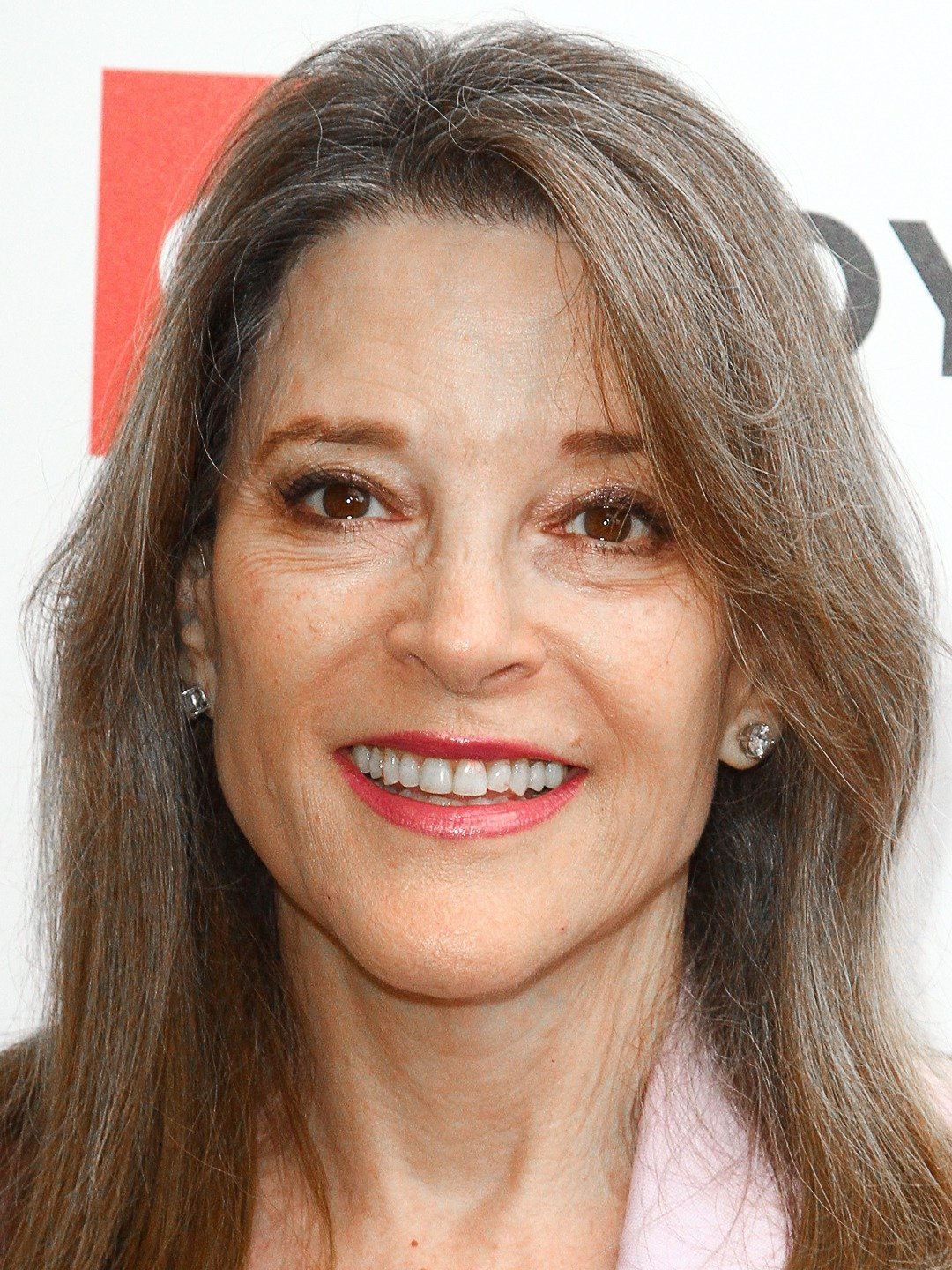
Candidate	Joe Biden	Marianne Williamson
Home state	Delaware	Washington, D.C.
Delegate count	244	0
Popular vote	831,247	43,667
Percentage	84.6%	4.4%

Biden
40–50%
50–60%
60–70%
70–80%
80–90%
>90%
Lozada
100%
No Votes

Results by precinct: Biden 30–40% 40–50% 50–60% 60–70% 70–80% 80–90% >90% / Williamson 30–40% 40–50% 50–60% >90% / Perez-Serrato 20–30% 30-40% 40–50% 50–60% 60–70% >90%; Phillips 50–60% 60–70% >90% / Cornejo 60–70% >90% / Uygur 50–60% >90%; Lozada >90% / Locke 60-70% >90% / No Votes / Tie

The 2024 Texas Democratic presidential primary took place on March 5, 2024, as part of the Democratic Party primaries for the 2024 presidential election. 244 delegates to the Democratic National Convention were allocated, with 28 additional unpledged delegates. The open primary was held on Super Tuesday alongside primaries in 14 other states and territories.

Incumbent Joe Biden easily won the primary without hurdles, but with opposition from various smaller candidates. Author Marianne Williamson placed second, US representative Dean Phillips only finished fourth behind Armando Perez-Serrato.

== Candidates ==
The filing deadline was December 11, 2023. The following candidates filed and proceeded to the primary:

- Joe Biden
- Gabriel Cornejo
- Star Locke
- Frankie Lozada
- Armando "Mando" Perez-Serrato
- Dean Phillips
- Cenk Uygur
- Marianne Williamson

The following candidate filed and was denied ballot access:

- Edward Kimbrough

== Endorsements ==
Joe Biden

U.S. Representatives

- Colin Allred, U.S. Representative from TX-32 (2019–present), candidate for U.S. Senator from Texas in 2024
- Greg Casar, U.S. Representative from TX-35 (2023–present)
- Joaquin Castro, U.S. Representative from TX-20 (2013–present)
- Jasmine Crockett, U.S. Representative from TX-30 (2023–present)
- Henry Cuellar, U.S. Representative from TX-28 (2005–present), 102nd Secretary of State of Texas (2001)
- Veronica Escobar, U.S. Representative from TX-16 (2019–present)
- Lizzie Fletcher, U.S. Representative from TX-07 (2019–present)
- Sylvia Garcia, U.S. Representative from TX-29 (2019–present)
- Al Green, U.S. Representative from TX-09 (2005–present)
- Sheila Jackson Lee, U.S. Representative from TX-18 (1995–present), candidate for Mayor of Houston in 2023
- Marc Veasey, U.S. Representative from TX-33 (2013–present)

Local officials

- Lina Hidalgo, Harris County Judge (2019–present)

== Results ==
Frankie Lozada won Loving County, the only other county victory by a candidate over Biden alongside Dean Phillips' victories in Oklahoma's Cimarron County and in Nebraska's Logan County. Biden's defeat in Loving County came through a single voter, as its low population (having 64 citizens as of the 2020 census) allowed the only voter to hand the county to minor candidate Frankie Lozada.

In South Texas, a region with a heavily Hispanic population, Biden significantly underperformed his statewide total, a continuation of his troubles with this demographic from 2020.

2024 Texas Democratic pres. primary
Candidate	Votes	%	Delegates
Joe Biden (incumbent)	831,247	84.64	244
Marianne Williamson	43,667	4.45	0
Armando Perez-Serrato	27,473	2.80	0
Dean Phillips	26,473	2.70	0
Gabriel Cornejo	17,196	1.75	0
Cenk Uygur	16,100	1.64	0
Frankie Lozada	11,311	1.15	0
Star Locke	8,602	0.88	0
Total	982,069	100%	244

== See also ==
- 2024 Texas Republican presidential primary
- 2024 Democratic Party presidential primaries
- 2024 United States presidential election
- 2024 United States presidential election in Texas
- 2024 United States elections
- 2024 Texas elections
