= 2024 Vermont Democratic presidential primary =

- March 5, 2024

24 delegates (16 pledged, 8 unpledged) to the Democratic National Convention

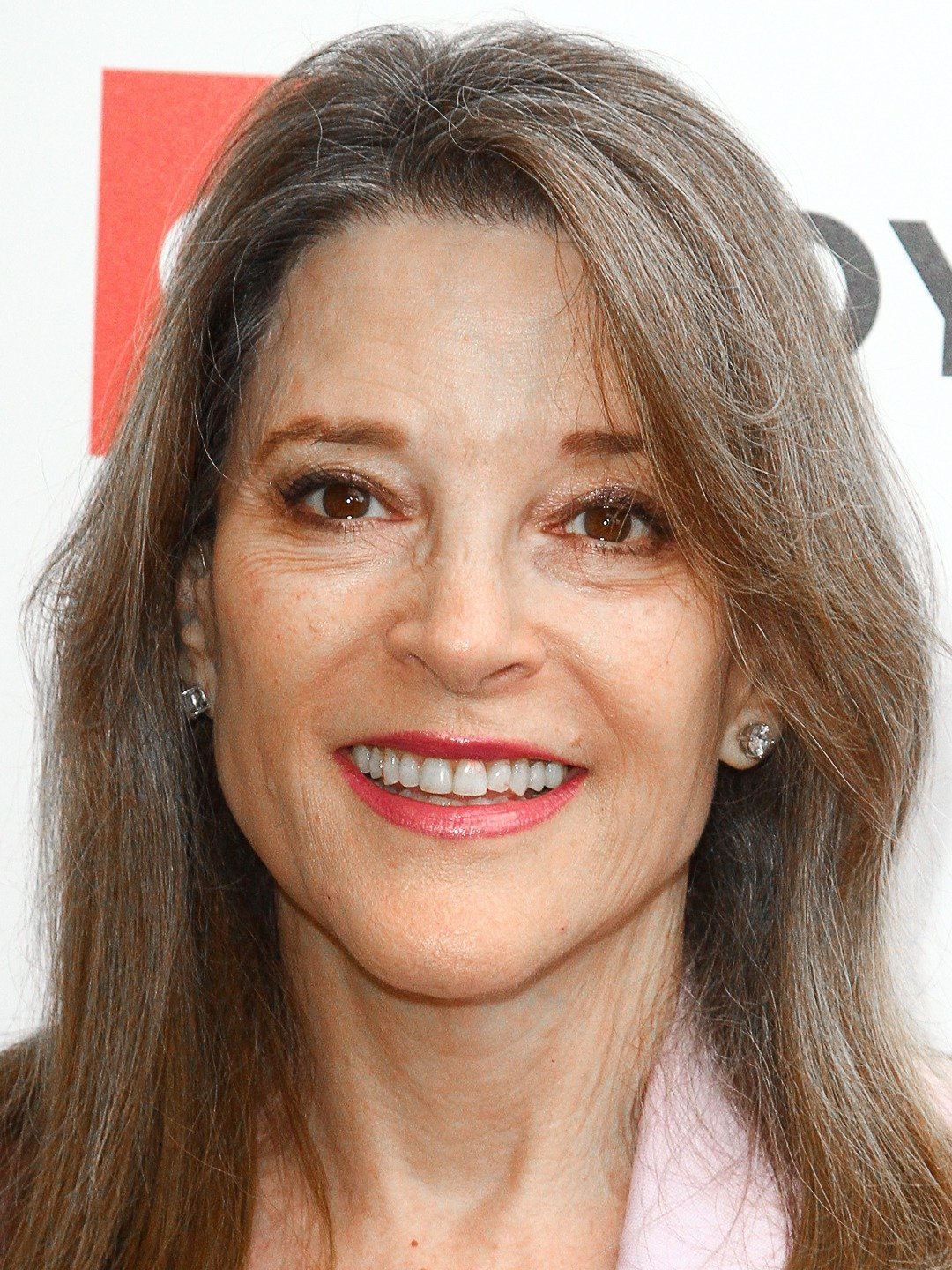
Candidate	Joe Biden	Marianne Williamson
Home state	Delaware	Washington, D.C.
Delegate count	16	0
Popular vote	56,924	2,873
Percentage	83.0%	4.2%
County results
Biden
80–90%
>90%

The 2024 Vermont Democratic presidential primary took place on March 5, 2024, as part of the Democratic Party primaries for the 2024 presidential election. 16 delegates to the Democratic National Convention were allocated, with 8 additional unpledged delegates. The open primary was held on Super Tuesday alongside primaries in 14 other states and territories.

President Joe Biden won the primary effectively without opposition and received all delegates ahead of Marianne Williamson and Dean Phillips. All candidates except for Biden placed below 5%.

== Candidates ==
The following candidates filed:

- Joe Biden
- Mark Stewart Greenstein
- Jason Micheal Palmer
- Dean Phillips
- Cenk Uygur
- Marianne Williamson

== Endorsements ==
Joe Biden

U.S. Senators

- Bernie Sanders, U.S. Senator from Vermont (2007–present), U.S. Representative from VT-AL (1991–2007), candidate for president in 2016 and 2020

== Results ==
2024 Vermont Democratic pres. primary
Candidate	Votes	%	Delegates
Joe Biden (incumbent)	56,924	82.98	16
Marianne Williamson	2,873	4.19	0
Dean Phillips	1,942	2.83	0
Mark Greenstein	779	1.14	0
Rashida Tlaib (write-in)	763	1.11	0
Cenk Uygur	700	1.02	0
Jason Palmer	404	0.59	0
Kamala Harris (write-in)	23	0.03	0
"Blank" (write-in)	556	0.81	—
Robert F. Kennedy Jr. (write-in, Independent)	322	0.47	0
Bernie Sanders (write-in, Independent)	288	0.42	0
Nikki Haley (write-in, Republican)	187	0.27	0
Other write-in votes	1,240	1.81	0
Blank ballots and Overvotes	(Note: 1,525 blank ballots, 73 overvotes)1,598	2.33	—
Total	68,599	100%	16

== Polling ==
Poll source	Date(s) administered	Sample size (Note: Key: A – all adults RV – registered voters LV – likely voters V – unclear)	Margin of error	Joe Biden	Dean Phillips	Marianne Williamson	Other	Undecided
University of New Hampshire	February 15–19, 2024	435 (LV)	± 4.7%	81%	5%	–	10%	5%
University of New Hampshire	February 15–19, 2024	393 (LV)	± 4.9%	76%	3%	4%	10%	7%

== See also ==
- 2024 Vermont Republican presidential primary
- 2024 Democratic Party presidential primaries
- 2024 United States presidential election
- 2024 United States presidential election in Vermont
- 2024 United States elections
