= 2024 California Democratic presidential primary =

- March 5, 2024

495 delegates (424 pledged, 71 unpledged) to the Democratic National Convention

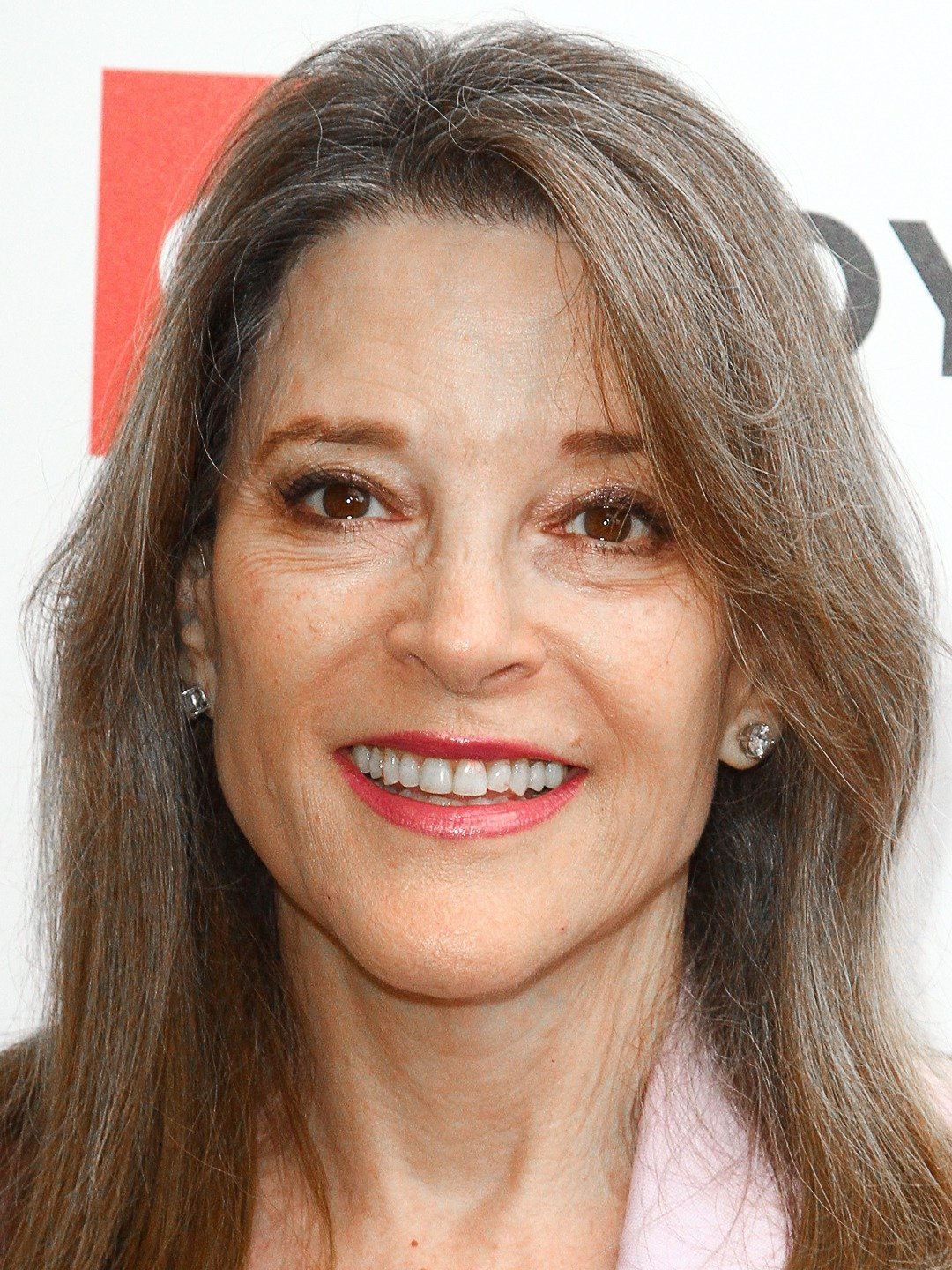
| Candidate | Joe Biden | Marianne Williamson |
| Home state | Delaware | Washington, D.C. |
| Delegate count | 424 | 0 |
| Popular vote | 3,207,687 | 146,356 |
| Percentage | 89.1% | 4.1% |

Biden
70 – 80%
80 – 90%
90 – 100%

The 2024 California Democratic presidential primary took place on March 5, 2024, as part of the Democratic Party primaries for the 2024 presidential election. 424 delegates to the Democratic National Convention were allocated, with 71 additional unpledged delegates. The semi-closed primary was held on Super Tuesday alongside primaries in 14 other states and territories.

Biden won with around 89% and received all 424 delegates, ahead of author Marianne Williamson with 4% and representative Dean Phillips with 3% of the vote.

== Candidates ==
The following candidates were certified by the secretary of state of California:

- Joe Biden
- "President" R. Boddie
- Eban Cambridge
- Gabriel Cornejo
- Stephen P Lyons
- Armando "Mando" Perez-Serrato
- Dean Phillips
- Marianne Williamson

== Endorsements ==
Joe Biden

U.S. cabinet officials

- Hilda Solis, 25th U.S. secretary of labor (2009–2013), U.S. Representative from CA-32 (2001–2009)

U.S. senators

- Alex Padilla, U.S. senator from California (2021–present), 30th secretary of state of California (2015–2021)

U.S. representatives

- Pete Aguilar, U.S. representative from CA-33 (2015–present), chair of the House Democratic Caucus (2023–present)
- Ami Bera, U.S. representative from CA-06 (2013–present)
- Robert Garcia, U.S. representative from CA-42 (2023–present), 28th mayor of Long Beach (2014–2022)
- Sara Jacobs, U.S. representative from CA-51 (2021–present)
- Ro Khanna, U.S. representative from CA-17 (2017–present)
- Nancy Pelosi, U.S. representative from CA-11 (1987–present), speaker of the House (2007–2011, 2019–2023), House minority leader (2003–2007, 2011–2019)

Statewide officials

- Eleni Kounalakis, 50th lieutenant governor of California (2019–present), U.S. ambassador to Hungary (2010–2013)
- Gavin Newsom, 40th governor of California (2019–present), 49th lieutenant governor of California (2011–2019), 42nd mayor of San Francisco (2004–2011)

Mayors

- Karen Bass, 43rd mayor of Los Angeles (2022–present), U.S. representative from CA-37 (2011–2022)

Individuals

- Jeffrey Katzenberg, CEO of DreamWorks Animation, former CEO of The Walt Disney Company
- Rory Kennedy, documentary filmmaker, daughter of Robert F. Kennedy
- Haim Saban, businessman, media proprietor, and investor
- Tom Steyer, hedge fund manager, liberal activist, philanthropist, candidate for president in 2020
Marianne Williamson

Local officials

- Maebe A. Girl, at-large Silver Lake neighborhood councilor (2019–present) and drag queen

Individuals

- Kii Arens, pop-artist, graphic designer, and director
- Jamie Lee Curtis, actress and producer
- Jimmy Demers, singer
- Frances Fisher, actress

== Polling ==
| Poll source | Date(s) administered | Sample size (Note: Key: A – all adults RV – registered voters LV – likely voters V – unclear) | Margin of error | Joe Biden | Robert F. Kennedy Jr. | Dean Phillips | Marianne Williamson | Other | Undecided |
|---|---|---|---|---|---|---|---|---|---|
| | February 28, 2024 | Williamson re-launches her candidacy | | | | | | | |
| | February 7, 2024 | Williamson suspends her candidacy | | | | | | | |
| Emerson College/Nexstar | Nov 11–14, 2023 | 523 (LV) | ± 3.0% | 51% | – | 2% | 7% | 21% (Note: Gavin Newsom with 21%) | 13% |
| Emerson College/Nexstar | Nov 11–14, 2023 | 523 (LV) | ± 3.0% | 62% | – | 4% | 8% | 9% | 18% |
| | October 27, 2023 | Phillips declares his candidacy | | | | | | | |
| | October 9, 2023 | Kennedy withdraws from the primaries | | | | | | | |
| UC Berkeley IGS | Aug 24–29, 2023 | 2,833 (LV) | ± 3.0% | 66% | 9% | – | 3% | 6% | 16% |
| Emerson College | Jun 4–7, 2023 | 585 (LV) | ± 2.9% | 72% | 17% | – | 7% | 5% | – |

Hypothetical polling

| Poll source | Date(s) administered | Sample size | Margin of error | Stacey Abrams | Pete Buttigieg | Hillary Clinton | Kamala Harris | Amy Klobuchar | Gavin Newsom | Alexandria Ocasio-Cortez | Bernie Sanders | Elizabeth Warren | Other | Undecided |
|---|---|---|---|---|---|---|---|---|---|---|---|---|---|---|
| UC Berkeley IGS | Aug 9–15, 2022 | 9,254 (RV) | ± 2.5% | 3% | 7% | 4% | 10% | 3% | 13% | 7% | 13% | 6% | 14% (Note: Michael Bloomberg and Cory Booker with 2%; Gretchen Whitmer with 1%; Roy Cooper, Phil Murphy, Jared Polis, and J. B. Pritzker with 0%) | 19% |
| UC Berkeley IGS | Aug 9–15, 2022 | 9,254 (RV) | ± 2.5% | 4% | 8% | 5% | 12% | 4% | – | 7% | 15% | 7% | 18% (Note: Cory Booker with 3%; Michael Bloomberg and J. B. Pritzker with 2%; Gretchen Whitmer with 1%; Roy Cooper, Phil Murphy, and Jared Polis with 0%) | 21% |

== Results ==
2024 California Democratic pres. primary
| Candidate | Votes | % | Delegates |
|---|---|---|---|
| Joe Biden (incumbent) | 3,207,687 | 89.15 | 424 |
| Marianne Williamson | 146,356 | 4.07 | 0 |
| Dean Phillips | 100,284 | 2.79 | 0 |
| Armando Perez-Serrato | 43,105 | 1.20 | 0 |
| Gabriel Cornejo | 41,390 | 1.15 | 0 |
| "President" R. Boddie | 25,455 | 0.71 | 0 |
| Stephen P. Lyons | 21,062 | 0.59 | 0 |
| Eban Cambridge | 12,758 | 0.35 | 0 |
| Write-in votes | 29 | <0.01 | — |
| Total | 3,598,126 | 100% | 424 |

== See also ==
- 2024 California Republican presidential primary
- 2024 Democratic Party presidential primaries
- 2024 United States presidential election
- 2024 United States presidential election in California
- 2024 United States elections
