= Jason Palmer (politician) =

American businessman and politician (born 1971)

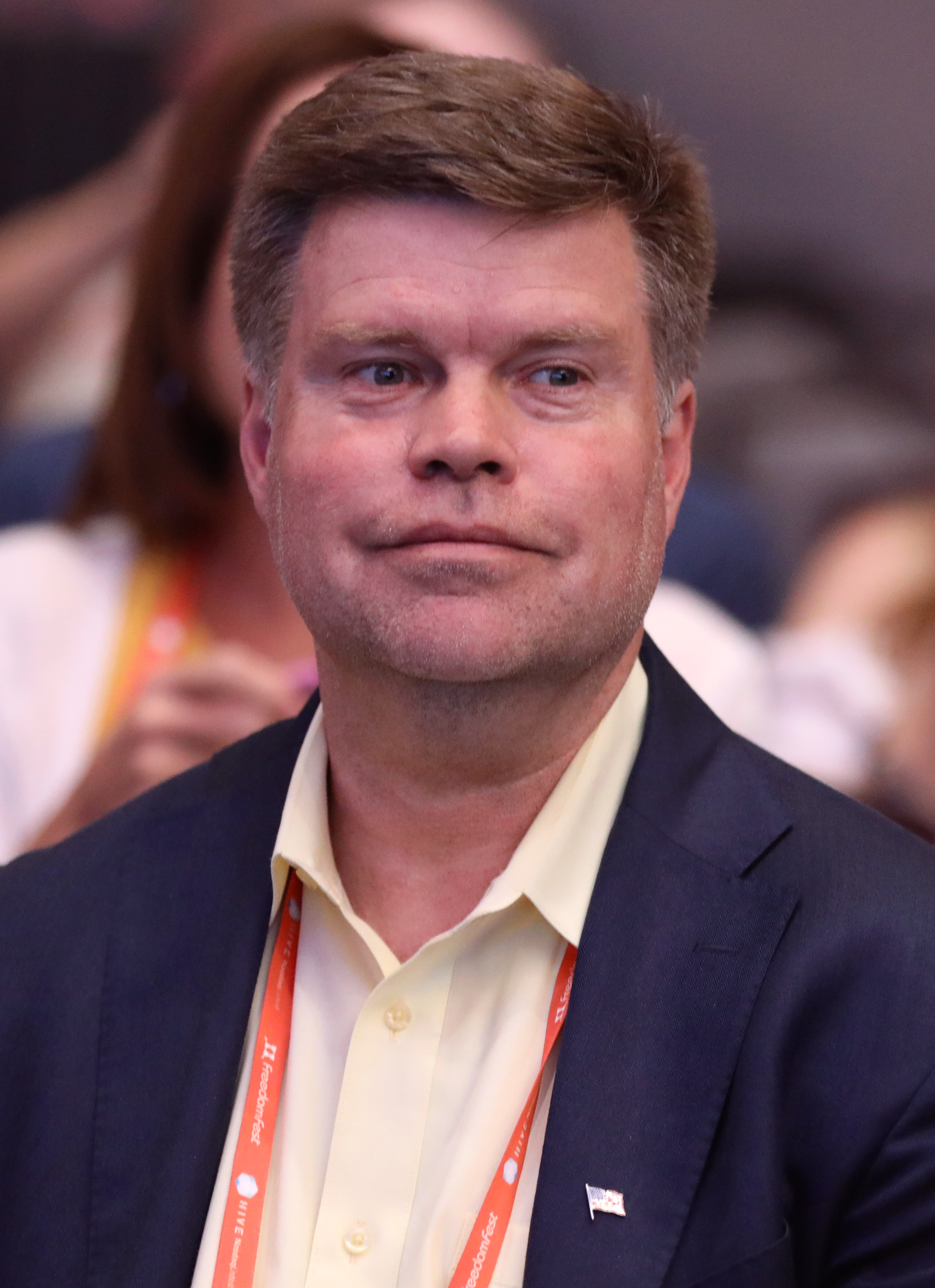
- Palmer in 2024
- Born: Jason Michael Palmer; December 1, 1971 (age 54); Aberdeen Proving Ground, Maryland, U.S.
- Education: University of Virginia (BA); Harvard University (MBA)
- Occupations: Entrepreneur, investor
- Known for: Defeating the incumbent president, Joe Biden, in the 2024 American Samoa Democratic presidential caucuses
- Political party: Democratic
- Website: Official website

Jason Michael Palmer (born December 1, 1971) is an American businessman, entrepreneur, investor, and politician who was a candidate in the 2024 Democratic Party presidential primaries. Palmer won the 2024 American Samoa Democratic presidential caucuses, with 51 votes compared to 40 for Joe Biden. He was awarded three of American Samoa's delegates to the 2024 Democratic National Convention. Palmer became the first presidential candidate to win a territory while running against an incumbent president in a presidential primary since Ted Kennedy defeated Jimmy Carter in 13 contests during the 1980 Democratic presidential primaries.

== Early life and education ==
Palmer was born at Aberdeen Proving Ground in Aberdeen, Maryland, on December 1, 1971. His father, Lonnie Palmer, was an educator and U.S. Army veteran who was superintendent of the City School District of Albany. Palmer's family moved away from Maryland shortly after he was born.

During high school, Palmer won multiple cross country and track regional championships, graduating from Averill Park High School in upstate New York. He graduated from the University of Virginia in 1994 with a Bachelor of Arts degree in Interdisciplinary Studies and earned a Master of Business Administration degree from Harvard Business School in 1999. Palmer's idea of using capitalism for civic good is an outgrowth of time spent in University of Virginia's economics professor Steven Rhoads’ courses. Palmer’s interest in government is thanks to University of Virginia professor Larry Sabato, with whom he still stays in touch.

He returned to Baltimore, Maryland, in 2010. Palmer is a Quaker.

== Business career ==
Early in his career, Palmer founded and grew three technology and services companies, before holding executive positions at Microsoft Education, SchoolNet, and Kaplan, where he was general manager and turnaround leader for multiple businesses, including corporate venture capital. He has been a member of the advisory board of the Smithsonian's National Zoo and Conservation Biology Institute. More recently, Palmer was deputy director for postsecondary education at the Bill & Melinda Gates Foundation and general partner at New Markets Venture Partners, a leading impact investing firm.

== Political career ==
=== Early career ===
In the 1990s, Palmer worked for Daniel Patrick Moynihan, a Democratic U.S. senator from New York.

=== 2024 presidential campaign ===
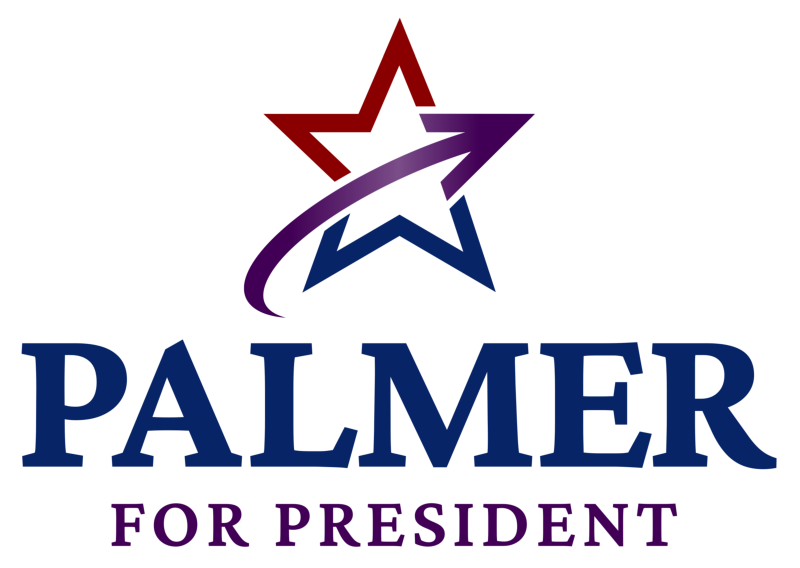
The logo for Palmer's 2024 presidential campaign

According to his campaign website, Palmer's campaign was based on three ideas: conscious capitalism, the new talent economy, and modernizing government. In Palmer’s telling, "conscious capitalism" means reshaping America’s corporate landscape –and the nation’s tax codes – to encourage more companies to focus on being in "business for good", which includes tracking what Palmer calls "impact metrics", or measurements of their positive contributions, resulting in B corporations similar to Ben & Jerry’s and Patagonia paying fewer taxes, and investments in them could be partly tax deductible. Palmer leveraged generative AI to communicate with voters via SMS text and email, and answer specific questions about his background and policy. Additionally, Palmer’s campaign website featured an avatar, PalmerAI, that answered questions with the candidate’s voice and likeness. He has described himself as a pragmatist, noting that he supported Democratic nominees Hillary Clinton and Biden in 2016 and 2020, but voted for Republican Governor Larry Hogan in the 2018 Maryland gubernatorial election.

On January 18, 2024, Politico published an interview with Palmer, in which he touted his status as the youngest Democratic presidential candidate and one of the youngest candidates in either party. He called on Biden and all older lawmakers to "pass the torch" to a younger generation of political leaders such as Gretchen Whitmer, Gavin Newsom, or Jared Polis. Palmer also promoted his management skills from his business career, stating that if elected, he would hire a skilled outsider if he lacked considerable knowledge in a field (like national defense or international relations). He also said he would center his term in office promoting technological advancements.

Also, on January 18, 2024, Palmer participated in the kickoff to the Free & Equal Elections 2024 presidential debate series, where he debated other Democratic presidential candidates.

Palmer was on the ballot in sixteen states and territories, including New Hampshire, Nevada, Colorado, Minnesota, Vermont, American Samoa, Northern Marianas, Arizona, Kansas, Missouri, North Dakota, Hawaii and West Virginia where he received a combined total of 21,027 votes. Palmer won the 2024 American Samoa Democratic presidential caucuses. He received 51 votes, while Joe Biden received 40, with a total turnout of 91 voters. Both candidates won three delegates each. Palmer's victory surprised many in the Democratic establishment; he became the first person to defeat an incumbent president in a primary contest since Ted Kennedy defeated Jimmy Carter in 12 primaries during the 1980 United States presidential election.

Before his victory there, Palmer digitally campaigned in American Samoa, posting on X that "Washington D.C. is long overdue for a president who will be an advocate for American Samoa". He campaigned mostly through town halls over Zoom, having never set foot in the territory. He learned of his victory while watching TV coverage of the Super Tuesday elections with friends at a Washington, D.C. hotel conference. Maddow compared Palmer to Michael Bloomberg during his failed 2020 bid for president as both won American Samoa after being the only candidate to campaign there, and both are wealthy with large disposable incomes. Palmer loaned over $500,000 to his campaign from his own money. Shortly after the American Samoa primaries, three minor Democratic candidates, Gabriel Cornejo, Frank Lozada, and Stephen Lyons, dropped out and endorsed Palmer.

Following his victory in American Samoa, Palmer campaigned in the Northern Mariana Islands, another territory of the United States, but only managed to obtain 4% of the vote. Later in the campaign, Palmer achieved 11% in West Virginia's primary despite having already endorsed President Biden.

On March 27, 2024, Palmer announced TOGETHER!, a B-Corporation PAC to reduce political polarization, increase participation of young voters, and get younger candidates elected to Congress.

On April 15, 2024, Palmer announced on X that he was endorsing President Biden for the 2024 general election, though he refrained at that time from officially suspending his campaign. Palmer withdrew from the race on May 15. Palmer also announced that his team would attend the 2024 Democratic National Convention in Chicago, where he was tasked with trying to win more Gen Z votes.

On July 10, 2024, Palmer urged Biden to end his bid for re-election in an interview with Semafor amid growing concerns about his potential to get re-elected. On July 15, the DNC sent an email asking delegates to indicate on a drop-down menu on who they will vote for: Joe Biden, Jason Palmer, Rep. Dean Phillips, or "uncommitted." Answers to that questionnaire reportedly essentially gave the DNC a whip count on how firm – or soft – support for Biden was among actual delegates. On July 21, 2024, Biden dropped out of the 2024 race, and Palmer went on to endorse Kamala Harris for president on July 24.
