= 2024 Republican Party presidential candidates =

Previous Republican nominee
Donald Trump
Republican nominee
Donald Trump

The following is a list of candidates associated with the 2024 Republican Party presidential primaries for the 2024 United States presidential election. As of December 2023, more than 400 candidates have filed with the Federal Election Commission (FEC) to run for the Republican nomination in 2024.

== Major candidates ==
The following candidates have received substantial major media coverage; are or have been elected to major public office such as president, vice president, governor, U.S. senator or U.S. representative; or have been included in at least five national polls.

=== Nominee ===
Republican nominee for the 2024 presidential election
Candidate	Born	Most recent position	Home state	Campaign Announcement date	Bound delegates (hard count; then floor)	Popular vote	Contests won	Running mate	Ref
Donald Trump	June 14, 1946 (age 78); Queens, New York	President of the United States (2017–2021)	Florida (Note: Trump's official state of residence was New York in the 2016 presidential election but later changed to Florida, when his permanent residence was switched from Trump Tower to Mar-a-Lago in 2019.)	Campaign November 15, 2022; FEC filing Website; Secured nomination: March 12, 2024	2,320 (95.5%) (floor 2,388)	17,015,756 (76.4%)	54; AK, AL, AR, AS, AZ, CA, CO, CT, DE, (Note: The Delaware Republican primary was cancelled and Trump was declared the winner after no other candidate filed) FL, GA, GU, HI, IA, ID, IL, IN, KS, KY, LA, MA, MD, ME, MI, MN, MO, MP, MS, MT, NC, ND, NE, NH, NJ, NM, NV, NY, OH, OK, OR, PA, PR, RI, SC, SD, (Note: The South Dakota Republican primary was cancelled and Trump was declared the winner after no other candidate filed.) TN, TX, UT, VA, VI, WA, WI, WV, WY	JD Vance	

=== Alternate ballot options ===
Alternate ballot options
Name	Bound delegates	Popular vote
No preference/ None of the above/ Uncommitted	0 (0%)	154,815 (0.7%)

=== Withdrew during the primaries ===
The candidate in this section have suspended their campaigns, or have otherwise ceased campaigning and ended their bids for the nomination during the primary season.

Major candidates who withdrew during the 2024 Republican Party presidential primaries
Candidate	Born	Most recent position	Home state	Campaign announced	Campaign suspended	Campaign	Bound delegates (hard count; then floor)	Contests won	Popular vote	Ref
Nikki Haley	January 20, 1972 (age 52); Bamberg, South Carolina	U.S. Ambassador to the United Nations (2017–2018)	South Carolina	February 14, 2023	March 6, 2024 (endorsed Trump)	Campaign FEC filing Website	97 (4.0%) (floor 41)	2 DC, VT	4,381,799 (19.7%)	
Ron DeSantis	September 14, 1978 (age 45); Jacksonville, Florida	Governor of Florida (2019–present)	Florida	May 24, 2023	January 21, 2024 (endorsed Trump)	Campaign FEC filing Website	9 (0.4%) (floor 0)	None	353,615 (1.6%)	
Asa Hutchinson	December 3, 1950 (age 73); Bentonville, Arkansas	Governor of Arkansas (2015–2023)	Arkansas	April 26, 2023	January 16, 2024 (endorsed Haley, then no endorsement)	Campaign FEC filing Website	0 (0.0%) (floor 0)	None	22,044 (0.1%)	
Vivek Ramaswamy	August 9, 1985 (age 38); Cincinnati, Ohio	Executive chairman of Strive Asset Management (2022–2023)	Ohio	February 21, 2023	January 15, 2024 (endorsed Trump)	Campaign FEC filing Website	3 (0.1%) (floor 0)	None	96,954 (0.4%)	

=== Withdrew before the primaries ===
The candidates in this section have suspended their campaigns, or have otherwise ceased campaigning and ended their bids for the nomination before any primary contests were held, however a few did so after securing ballot spots in a small number of states.

Major candidates who withdrew before the 2024 Republican Party presidential primaries
Candidate	Born	Most recent position	Home state	Campaign announced	Campaign suspended	Campaign	Bound delegates (hard count)	Popular vote	Ref.
Chris Christie	September 6, 1962 (age 61); Newark, New Jersey	Governor of New Jersey (2010–2018)	New Jersey	June 6, 2023	January 10, 2024	Campaign FEC filing Website	None	139,541 (0.6%)	
Doug Burgum	August 1, 1956 (age 67); Arthur, North Dakota	Governor of North Dakota (2016–2024)	North Dakota	June 7, 2023	December 4, 2023 (endorsed Trump)	Campaign FEC filing Website	None	502 (nil%)	
Tim Scott	September 19, 1965 (age 58); North Charleston, South Carolina	U.S. senator from South Carolina (2013–present)	South Carolina	May 19, 2023; Exploratory committee: April 12, 2023	November 12, 2023 (endorsed Trump)	Campaign FEC filing Website	None	1,598 (nil%)	
Mike Pence	June 7, 1959 (age 64); Columbus, Indiana	Vice President of the United States (2017–2021)	Indiana	June 5, 2023	October 28, 2023	Campaign FEC filing Website	None	404 (nil%)	
Larry Elder	April 27, 1952 (age 71); Los Angeles, California	Host of The Larry Elder Show (1993–2022)	California	April 20, 2023	October 26, 2023 (endorsed Trump)	Campaign FEC filing Website	None		
Perry Johnson	January 23, 1948 (age 75); Dolton, Illinois	Founder of Perry Johnson Registrars, Inc. (1994–present)	Michigan	March 2, 2023	October 20, 2023 (endorsed Trump)	Campaign FEC filing Website	None	4,051 (nil%)	
Will Hurd	August 19, 1977 (age 46); San Antonio, Texas	U.S. Representative from TX-23 (2015–2021)	Texas	June 22, 2023	October 9, 2023 (endorsed Haley, then no endorsement)	Campaign FEC filing Website	None		
Francis Suarez	October 6, 1977 (age 45); Miami, Florida	Mayor of Miami (2017–2025)	Florida	June 14, 2023	August 29, 2023 (endorsed Trump)	Campaign FEC filing Website (Note: Archived August 23, 2023, at the Wayback Machine)	None		

== Other candidates ==
=== On the ballot in one or more states ===
- Scott Alan Ayers, Illinois
- Bob Carney Jr., perennial candidate from Minnesota
- John Anthony Castro, tax consultant and perennial candidate from Texas
- Heath Fulkerson, Nevada
- Peter Jedick, author from Ohio
- Donald Kjornes, former real estate agent from South Dakota
- Mary Maxwell, perennial candidate
- Glenn J. McPeters, Vermont
- Scott Peterson Merrell, Connecticut
- Darius L. Mitchell, Massachusetts
- Sam Sloan, former broker-dealer United States Chess Federation executive board member, and perennial candidate from New York
- Rachel Swift, Maryland

=== Withdrawn ===
==== On the ballot in 25 or more states ====
- Ryan Binkley, pastor and businessman from Texas. (withdrew February 27, 2024, and endorsed Trump)

==== On the ballot in ten or more states ====
- David Stuckenberg, former air force reserve officer from Texas.(withdrew March 26, 2024)

==== On the ballot in one or more states ====
- Hirsh V. Singh, engineer and perennial candidate from New Jersey (withdrew October 31, 2023, and endorsed Trump)

==== Failed to obtain ballot access ====
- E. W. Jackson, pastor and nominee for lieutenant governor of Virginia in 2013 (withdrew January 23, 2024, endorsed Trump)
- Steve Laffey, mayor of Cranston, Rhode Island (2003–2007) and COO of Raymond James Morgan Keegan (2000–2001) (withdrew October 6, 2023)
- Corey Stapleton, Secretary of State of Montana (2017–2021) and Montana State Senator (2001–2009) (withdrew October 13, 2023)

== Declined to be candidates ==
The following notable individuals have been the subject of speculation about their possible candidacy but have publicly denied interest in running.

- Marsha Blackburn, U.S. Senator from Tennessee (2019–present), U.S. Representative from TN-07 (2003–2019), member of the Tennessee Senate from the 23rd district (1999–2003) (endorsed Trump, successfully ran for re-election)
- Tucker Carlson, host of Tucker Carlson Tonight (2016–2023) and co-founder of The Daily Caller
- Liz Cheney, U.S. Representative from WY-AL (2017–2023), Deputy Assistant Secretary of State for Near Eastern Affairs (2002–2004, 2005–2009)
- Chad Connelly, CEO of Faith Wins and Chairman of the South Carolina Republican Party (2011–2013)
- Tom Cotton, U.S. Senator from Arkansas (2015–present), U.S. Representative from AR-04 (2013–2015) (endorsed Trump)
- Dan Crenshaw, U.S. Representative from TX-02 (2019–present) (successfully ran for re-election)
- Ted Cruz, U.S. Senator from Texas (2013–present), 3rd Texas Solicitor General (2003–2008), candidate for president in 2016 (endorsed Trump, successfully ran for re-election)
- Joni Ernst, U.S. Senator from Iowa (2015–present), member of the Iowa Senate from the 12th district (2011–2014), Montgomery County Auditor (2005–2011)
- Josh Hawley, U.S. Senator from Missouri (2019–present), 42nd Missouri Attorney General (2017–2019) (endorsed Trump, successfully ran for re-election)
- Larry Hogan, 62nd Governor of Maryland (2015–2023), Maryland Secretary of Appointments (2003–2007) (endorsed Haley, ran for Senate)
- Brian Kemp, 83rd Governor of Georgia (2019–present), 27th Georgia Secretary of State (2010–2018), member of the Georgia Senate from the 46th district (2003–2007)
- Adam Kinzinger, U.S. Representative from IL-16 (2011–2023)
- Pat McCrory, 74th Governor of North Carolina (2013–2017) and 53rd Mayor of Charlotte (1995–2009)
- Kristi Noem, 33rd Governor of South Dakota (2019–2025), U.S. Representative from SD-AL (2011–2019) (endorsed Trump)
- Dan Patrick, 42nd Lieutenant Governor of Texas (2015–present), member of the Texas Senate from the 7th district (2007–2015) (endorsed Trump)
- Rand Paul, U.S. Senator from Kentucky (2011–present), candidate for president in 2016
- Mike Pompeo, 70th United States Secretary of State (2018–2021), 6th Director of the Central Intelligence Agency (2017–2018), U.S. Representative from KS-04 (2011–2017)
- Mike Rogers, U.S. Representative from MI-08 (2001–2015), Michigan State Senator from District 26 (1995–2001) (endorsed Trump, ran for U.S. Senate)
- Mitt Romney, U.S. Senator from Utah (2019–2025), 70th Governor of Massachusetts (2003–2007), nominee for president in 2012 and candidate in 2008
- Marco Rubio, U.S. Senator from Florida (2011–2025), 94th Speaker of the Florida House of Representatives (2006–2008) from the 111th district (2000–2008), member of the West Miami City Commission (1998–2000), candidate for president in 2016 (endorsed Trump)
- Paul Ryan, 54th Speaker of the United States House of Representatives (2015–2019) from WI-01 (1999–2019) and nominee for vice president in 2012 (endorsed Haley)
- Rick Scott, U.S. Senator from Florida (2019–present), 45th Governor of Florida (2011–2019) (endorsed Trump, successfully ran for re-election)
- Chris Sununu, 82nd Governor of New Hampshire (2017–2025), member of the New Hampshire Executive Council (2011–2017) (endorsed Haley)
- Donald Trump Jr., businessman, executive vice president of The Trump Organization, son of former president Donald Trump
- Ivanka Trump, Senior Advisor to the President of the United States (2017–2021), daughter of former president Donald Trump
- Scott Walker, 45th Governor of Wisconsin (2011–2019), 5th Milwaukee County Executive (2002–2010), member of the Wisconsin State Assembly from the 14th district (1993–2002), candidate for president in 2016
- Glenn Youngkin, 74th Governor of Virginia (2022–2026)

== Timeline ==
Active campaign	Exploratory committee	Withdrawn candidate	Republican National Convention
Midterm elections	Debates	Primaries	Republican National Convention

== Ballot access ==
The following is a table of which candidates have received ballot access in which states.

Yes indicates that the candidate was on the ballot for the primary contest.
No indicates that the candidate did not appear on the ballot in that state's contest.
indicates that a candidate withdrew before the election but was still listed on the ballot.

Ballot access in the 2024 Republican presidential nominating contests
Contest	Date	Trump	Haley	Binkley	DeSantis	Hutchinson	Ramaswamy	Others	Ref
Iowa	Jan 15	Yes	Yes	Yes	Yes	Yes	Yes	(Note: Chris Christie)	
New Hampshire	Jan 23	Yes	Yes	Yes	Yes-withdrawn	Yes-withdrawn	Yes-withdrawn	Yes (Note: Scott Alan Ayers, Doug Burgum, Robert S. Carney Jr., John Anthony Castro, Chris Christie, Peter Jedick, Perry Johnson, Donald Kjornes, Mary Maxwell, Glenn J. McPeters, Scott Peterson Merrell, Darius L. Mitchell, Mike Pence, Tim Scott, Hirsh V. Singh, Samuel Howard Sloan, David Stuckenberg, Rachel Swift. Recognized Write-ins: Joe Biden (running as a Democrat), Dean Phillips (running as a Democrat), Marianne Williamson (running as a Democrat), Robert F. Kennedy Jr. (running as an independent), Mark Greenstein (running as a Democrat), CeaseFire (not a candidate))	
Nevada primary (Note: This primary has not been officially sanctioned by the RNC.)	Feb 6	No	Yes	No	No	No	No	Yes (Note: John Anthony Castro, Heath V. Fulkerson, Mike Pence, Tim Scott, Hirsh V. Singh, Donald Kjornes, None of These Candidates)	
Nevada caucus	Feb 8	Yes	No	Yes	No	No	No	No	
Virgin Islands	Feb 8	Yes	Yes	No	Yes-withdrawn	No	Yes-withdrawn	(Note: Chris Christie, Perry Johnson)	
South Carolina	Feb 24	Yes	Yes	Yes	Yes-withdrawn	No	Yes-withdrawn	Yes (Note: Chris Christie, David Stuckenberg)	
Michigan primary	Feb 27	Yes	Yes	Yes-withdrawn	Yes-withdrawn	Yes-withdrawn	Yes-withdrawn	Yes-withdrawn	
Idaho	Mar 2	Yes	Yes	Yes-withdrawn	Yes-withdrawn	No	Yes-withdrawn	Yes-withdrawn	
Michigan caucus	Mar 2	Yes	Yes	No	No	No	No	No	
Missouri	Mar 2	Yes	Yes	No	No	No	No	Yes (Note: David Stuckenburg)	
District of Columbia	Mar 3	Yes	Yes	Yes-withdrawn	Yes-withdrawn	No	Yes-withdrawn	Yes (Note: Chris Christie, Doug Burgum, David Stuckenberg)	
North Dakota	Mar 4	Yes	Yes	Yes-withdrawn	No	No	No	Yes (Note: David Stuckenberg)	
Alabama	Mar 5	Yes	Yes	Yes-withdrawn	Yes-withdrawn	No	Yes-withdrawn	Yes (Note: Chris Christie, David Stuckenberg)	
Alaska	Mar 5	Yes	Yes	No	No	No	Yes-withdrawn	No	
Arkansas	Mar 5	Yes	Yes	Yes-withdrawn	Yes-withdrawn	Yes-withdrawn	Yes-withdrawn	Yes (Note: Doug Burgum, Chris Christie, David Stuckenberg)	
California	Mar 5	Yes	Yes	Yes-withdrawn	Yes-withdrawn	Yes-withdrawn	Yes-withdrawn	Yes (Note: Chris Christie, David Stuckenberg, Rachel Swift Recognized Write-in candidates: Hugo C Aguilar, Ryan Stephen Ehrenreich, Douglas Groves Doug Burgum filed for inclusion but withdrew before the ballot was finalized)	
Colorado	Mar 5	Yes	Yes	Yes-withdrawn	Yes-withdrawn	Yes-withdrawn	Yes-withdrawn	(Note: Chris Christie, Walter Iwachiw (write-in), Rachel Swift (write-in))	
Maine	Mar 5	Yes (Note: Trump was removed from the ballot by the Maine Secretary of State due to his participation in the January 6 attack, but the decision was placed on hold while the related case Colorado case of Anderson v. Griswold makes its way through the courts. On March 4, 2024, the U.S. Supreme Court ruled that Trump would not be removed from the ballot.)	Yes	Yes-withdrawn	Yes-withdrawn	No	Yes-withdrawn		
Massachusetts	Mar 5	Yes	Yes	Yes-withdrawn	Yes-withdrawn	Yes-withdrawn	Yes-withdrawn	Yes-withdrawn	
Minnesota	Mar 5	Yes	Yes	No	Yes-withdrawn	No	Yes-withdrawn	Yes-withdrawn	
North Carolina	Mar 5	Yes	Yes	Yes-withdrawn	Yes-withdrawn	Yes-withdrawn	Yes-withdrawn	Yes-withdrawn	
Oklahoma	Mar 5	Yes	Yes	Yes-withdrawn	Yes-withdrawn	Yes-withdrawn	Yes-withdrawn	Yes (Note: Chris Christie, David Stuckenberg)	
Tennessee	Mar 5	Yes	Yes	Yes-withdrawn	Yes-withdrawn	Yes-withdrawn	Yes-withdrawn	Yes (Note: Chris Christie, David Stuckenberg)	
Texas	Mar 5	Yes	Yes	Yes-withdrawn	Yes-withdrawn	Yes-withdrawn	Yes-withdrawn	Yes	
Utah	Mar 5	Yes	Yes	Yes-withdrawn	Yes-withdrawn	Yes-withdrawn	Yes-withdrawn	No	
Vermont	Mar 5	Yes	Yes	Yes-withdrawn	Yes-withdrawn	No	Yes-withdrawn	Yes-withdrawn	
Virginia	Mar 5	Yes	Yes	Yes-withdrawn	Yes-withdrawn	No	Yes-withdrawn	Yes-withdrawn	
American Samoa	Mar 8	Yes	Yes-withdrawn	No	No	No	No	No	
Georgia	Mar 12	Yes	Yes-withdrawn	Yes-withdrawn	Yes-withdrawn	Yes-withdrawn	Yes-withdrawn	Yes (Note: Doug Burgum, Chris Christie, Perry Johnson, Tim Scott, David Stuckenberg)	
Hawaii	Mar 12	Yes	Yes-withdrawn	Yes-withdrawn	Yes-withdrawn	No	Yes-withdrawn	Yes	
Mississippi	Mar 12	Yes	Yes-withdrawn	No	Yes-withdrawn	No	Yes-withdrawn	No	
Washington	Mar 12	Yes	Yes-withdrawn	No	Yes-withdrawn	No	Yes-withdrawn	Yes-withdrawn	
Northern Mariana Islands	Mar 15	Yes	Yes-withdrawn	No	No	No	No	No	
Guam	Mar 16	Yes	Yes-withdrawn	No	No	No	No	No	
Arizona	Mar 19	Yes	Yes-withdrawn	Yes-withdrawn	Yes-withdrawn	Yes-withdrawn	Yes-withdrawn	Yes (Note: John Anthony Castro, Chris Christie, David Stuckenberg)	
Florida	Mar 19	Yes	Yes-withdrawn	Yes-withdrawn	Yes-withdrawn	Yes-withdrawn	Yes-withdrawn	(Note: Chris Christie)	
Kansas	Mar 19	Yes	Yes-withdrawn	Yes-withdrawn	Yes-withdrawn	No	No	No	
Illinois	Mar 19	Yes	Yes-withdrawn	Yes-withdrawn	Yes-withdrawn	No	No	Yes-withdrawn	
Ohio	Mar 19	Yes	Yes-withdrawn	No	Yes-withdrawn	No	Yes-withdrawn	Yes-withdrawn	
Louisiana	Mar 23	Yes	Yes-withdrawn	Yes-withdrawn	Yes-withdrawn	Yes-withdrawn	Yes-withdrawn	Yes (Note: Chris Christie, David Stuckenberg, Rachel Swift)	
Connecticut	April 2	Yes	Yes-withdrawn	Yes-withdrawn	Yes-withdrawn	No	No	No	
New York	April 2	Yes	Yes-withdrawn	No	No	No	Yes-withdrawn	Yes-withdrawn	
Rhode Island	April 2	Yes	Yes-withdrawn	No	Yes-withdrawn	No	Yes-withdrawn	Yes-withdrawn	
Wisconsin	April 2	Yes	Yes-withdrawn	No	Yes-withdrawn	No	Yes-withdrawn	Yes-withdrawn	
Wyoming	Apr 20	Yes	No	No	No	No	No	No	
Puerto Rico	Apr 21	Yes	No	No	No	No	No	No	
Pennsylvania	Apr 23	Yes	Yes-withdrawn	No	No	No	No	No	
Indiana	May 7	Yes	Yes-withdrawn	No	No	No	No		
Maryland	May 14	Yes	Yes-withdrawn	No	No	No	No	No	
Nebraska	May 14	Yes	Yes-withdrawn	No	No	No	No	(Note: Perry Johnson)	
West Virginia	May 14	Yes	Yes-withdrawn	Yes-withdrawn	No	No	No	(Note: Rachel Swift, David Stuckenberg)	
Kentucky	May 21	Yes	Yes-withdrawn	Yes-withdrawn	Yes-withdrawn	No	Yes-withdrawn	Yes-withdrawn	
Oregon	May 21	Yes	No	No	No	No	No	No	
New Jersey	Jun 4	Yes	No	No	No	No	No	No	
Montana	Jun 4	Yes	No	No	No	No	No	No	
New Mexico	Jun 4	Yes	Yes-withdrawn	No	No	No	Yes-withdrawn	Yes-withdrawn	
Delaware	NA (Note: cancelled)	Yes	No	No	No	No	No	No	
South Dakota	NA	Yes	No	No	No	No	No	No	
Total possible delegates		2,429	2,232	1,533	1,707	1,014	1,718	Chris Christie: 1,653; David Stuckenberg: 895; Uncommitted: (Note: Includes No Preference, None of These Candidates, and Uninstructed) 634	

Candidates listed in italics have suspended their campaigns.

== See also ==
- 2024 Democratic Party presidential candidates
- Third party and independent candidates for the 2024 United States presidential election
- Timeline of the 2024 United States presidential election
