= 2024 United States presidential election in Idaho =

- November 5, 2024
- Turnout: 77.8% (of registered voters) ▼

Nominee	Donald Trump	Kamala Harris
Party	Republican	Democratic
Home state	Florida	California
Running mate	JD Vance	Tim Walz
Electoral vote	4	0
Popular vote	605,246	274,972
Percentage	66.87%	30.38%

Trump
40–50%
50–60%
60–70%
70–80%
80–90%
90–100%
Harris
40–50%
50–60%
60–70%
70–80%
80–90%
Tie/No data
President before election
Joe Biden
Democratic
Elected President
Donald Trump
Republican

The 2024 United States presidential election in Idaho took place on Tuesday, November 5, 2024, as part of the 2024 United States presidential election in which all 50 states plus the District of Columbia participated. Idaho voters chose electors to represent them in the Electoral College via a popular vote. The state of Idaho has 4 electoral votes in the Electoral College, following reapportionment due to the 2020 United States census in which the state neither gained nor lost a seat.

Prior to the election, all major news organizations considered Idaho a solid red state; a sparsely populated Mountain state with an overwhelmingly White populace, a large Mormon population, and an evangelical predominance, Idaho is one of the most staunchly conservative states in the U.S., with the only Democratic presidential candidate to carry the state after Harry Truman in 1948 being landslide winner Lyndon B. Johnson in 1964, and Republicans having never won the state's electoral votes by less than 13% since.

As expected, Republican Donald Trump overwhelmingly won Idaho, taking 66.9% of the vote to Democrat Kamala Harris' 30.4% and winning the state by 36.5%, well above his 30.8% in 2020 and his 31.8% in 2016, and the widest presidential margin of victory in Idaho since George W. Bush's 38.1% in 2004. Idaho was Trump's third strongest state nationwide, only behind West Virginia and neighboring Wyoming.

This was the first election in which Teton County, Idaho voted for a Democrat who lost the presidential election.

== Primary elections ==
The Idaho Legislature passed HB 138 during the 2023 legislative session, resulting in the elimination of the state-run primary for all parties. The legislature did not restore the state-run primary by the October 1 deadline, and both the major parties in the state opted to operate and fund firehouse nominations for president.

=== Republican primary ===
The Idaho Republican primary was held on March 2, 2024, alongside primaries in Hawaii, Mississippi, Missouri, and Washington.

Idaho Republican caucus, March 2, 2024
Candidate	Votes	Percentage	Actual delegate count		
Candidate	Votes	Percentage	Bound	Unbound	Total
Donald Trump	33,603	84.89%	32	0	32
Nikki Haley	5,221	13.18%	0	0	0
Ron DeSantis (withdrawn)	534	1.35%	0	0	0
Vivek Ramaswamy (withdrawn)	95	0.24%	0	0	0
Chris Christie (withdrawn)	91	0.23%	0	0	0
Ryan Binkley (withdrawn)	40	0.10%	0	0	0
Total	39,584	100.00%	32	0	32

=== Democratic caucuses ===
The Idaho Democratic presidential caucuses were held on May 23, 2024.

Idaho Democratic caucus, May 23, 2024
Candidate	Votes	%	Delegates
Joe Biden (incumbent)	2,297	95.23	23
Marianne Williamson	79	3.28	0
Dean Phillips (withdrawn)	14	0.58	0
David Olscamp	14	0.58	0
Jason Palmer (withdrawn)	5	0.21	0
Armando Perez-Serrato	3	0.12	0
Total	2,412	100%	23

== General election ==
=== Candidates ===
The official list of certified candidates was finalized by Idaho secretary of state Phil McGrane on September 4, 2024, with the following nine candidates qualifying:

- Kamala Harris / Tim Walz – Democratic
- Donald Trump / JD Vance – Republican
- Joel Skousen / Rik Combs – Constitution
- Chase Oliver / Mike ter Maat – Libertarian
- Shiva Ayyadurai / Crystal Ellis – independent
- Claudia De la Cruz / Karina Garcia – independent
- Robert F. Kennedy Jr. / Nicole Shanahan – independent
- Jill Stein / Butch Ware – independent
- Randall Terry / Stephen Broden – independent

Despite Terry being the nominee of the national Constitution Party, the state party dissented and chose to nominate Joel Skousen. Terry then petitioned to appear on the ballot as an independent candidate.

=== Predictions ===
Source	Ranking	As of
Cook Political Report	Solid R	December 19, 2023
Inside Elections	Solid R	April 26, 2023
Sabato's Crystal Ball	Safe R	June 29, 2023
Decision Desk HQ/The Hill	Safe R	December 14, 2023
CNalysis	Solid R	December 30, 2023
CNN	Solid R	January 14, 2024
The Economist	Safe R	June 12, 2024
538	Solid R	June 11, 2024
RCP	Solid R	June 26, 2024
NBC News	Safe R	October 6, 2024

=== Polling ===
Hypothetical polling with Donald J. Trump and Joe Biden

Donald J. Trump vs. Joe Biden

Poll source	Date(s) administered	Sample size (Note: Key: A – all adults RV – registered voters LV – likely voters V – unclear)	Margin of error	Donald J. Trump Republican	Joe Biden Democratic	Other / Undecided
	July 21, 2024	Joe Biden withdraws from the race.				
John Zogby Strategies (Note: Poll conducted for Kennedy's campaign)	April 13–21, 2024	309 (LV)	–	60%	30%	10%
Emerson College	October 1–4, 2023	490 (RV)	± 4.4%	55%	26%	19%

Hypothetical polling with other candidates

Donald J. Trump vs. Robert F. Kennedy Jr.

Poll source	Date(s) administered	Sample size	Margin of error	Donald J. Trump Republican	Robert Kennedy Jr. Independent	Other / Undecided
John Zogby Strategies	April 13–21, 2024	309 (LV)	–	54%	32%	14%

Robert F. Kennedy Jr. vs. Joe Biden

Poll source	Date(s) administered	Sample size	Margin of error	Robert Kennedy Jr. Independent	Joe Biden Democratic	Other / Undecided
John Zogby Strategies	April 13–21, 2024	309 (LV)	–	60%	25%	15%

=== Results ===
State House district results: Trump 50–60% 60–70% 70–80% 80–90% / Harris 50–60% 60–70%

2024 United States presidential election in Idaho
Party	Candidate	Votes	%	±%
Republican	Donald Trump; JD Vance	605,246	66.87%	▲3.03%
Democratic	Kamala Harris; Tim Walz	274,972	30.38%	▼2.69%
Independent	Robert F. Kennedy Jr. (withdrawn); Nicole Shanahan (withdrawn)	12,812	1.42%	N/A
Libertarian	Chase Oliver; Mike ter Maat	4,462	0.49%	▼1.40%
Green	Jill Stein (Note: Listed on the ballot without party affiliation.); Samson Kpadenou (Note: Replacement for Butch Ware, Stein's vice presidential nominee.)	2,973	0.33%	▲0.28%
Constitution	Joel Skousen (Note: Randall Terry was nominated by the national Constitution Party, though the state party nominated Joel Skousen.); Rik Combs	1,577	0.17%	▼0.05%
Socialism and Liberation	Claudia De la Cruz; Karina Garcia	1,230	0.14%	▲0.13%
Independent	Randall Terry; Stephen Broden	1,026	0.11%	N/A
Independent	Shiva Ayyadurai; Crystal Ellis	514	0.1%	N/A
American Solidarity	Peter Sonski (write-in) Lauren Onak (write-in)	242	0.03%	▲0.01%
Independent	Other (write-in)	3	0.00%	Steady
Total votes		905,057	100.00%	N/A

==== By county ====
County	Donald Trump Republican		Kamala Harris Democratic		Various candidates Other parties		Margin		Total
County	#	%	#	%	#	%	#	%	Total
Ada	143,759	53.36%	116,116	43.10%	9,558	3.54%	27,643	10.34%	267,419
Adams	2,037	75.98%	577	21.52%	67	2.50%	1,460	54.46%	2,681
Bannock	24,329	60.86%	14,306	35.79%	1,341	3.35%	10,023	25.07%	39,976
Bear Lake	2,908	87.46%	346	10.41%	71	2.13%	2,562	77.05%	3,325
Benewah	4,094	79.57%	935	18.17%	116	2.26%	3,159	61.40%	5,145
Bingham	16,188	78.39%	3,878	18.78%	585	2.83%	12,310	59.61%	20,651
Blaine	4,281	32.71%	8,424	64.36%	384	2.93%	-4,143	-31.65%	13,089
Boise	3,727	75.91%	1,065	21.69%	118	2.40%	2,662	54.22%	4,910
Bonner	21,352	71.87%	7,650	25.75%	708	2.38%	13,702	46.12%	29,710
Bonneville	40,053	70.97%	14,458	25.62%	1,925	3.41%	25,595	45.35%	56,436
Boundary	5,794	81.49%	1,145	16.10%	171	2.41%	4,649	65.39%	7,110
Butte	1,268	84.87%	185	12.38%	41	2.75%	1,083	72.49%	1,494
Camas	547	75.14%	153	21.02%	28	3.84%	394	54.12%	728
Canyon	72,755	72.01%	25,669	25.41%	2,606	2.58%	47,086	46.60%	101,030
Caribou	2,906	84.09%	445	12.88%	105	3.03%	2,461	71.21%	3,456
Cassia	7,959	83.27%	1,359	14.22%	240	2.51%	6,600	69.05%	9,558
Clark	280	84.08%	50	15.02%	3	0.90%	230	69.06%	333
Clearwater	3,550	80.32%	774	17.51%	96	2.17%	2,776	62.81%	4,420
Custer	1,998	75.40%	586	22.11%	66	2.49%	1,412	53.29%	2,650
Elmore	7,791	73.00%	2,611	24.47%	270	2.53%	5,180	48.53%	10,672
Franklin	6,279	87.40%	703	9.79%	202	2.81%	5,576	77.61%	7,184
Fremont	5,645	82.98%	954	14.02%	204	3.00%	4,691	68.96%	6,803
Gem	8,707	81.99%	1,699	16.00%	214	2.01%	7,008	65.99%	10,620
Gooding	4,676	79.01%	1,100	18.59%	142	2.40%	3,576	60.42%	5,918
Idaho	8,148	82.58%	1,460	14.80%	259	2.62%	6,688	67.78%	9,867
Jefferson	13,481	85.21%	1,891	11.95%	448	2.84%	11,590	73.26%	15,820
Jerome	6,012	75.66%	1,742	21.92%	192	2.42%	4,270	53.74%	7,946
Kootenai	72,059	74.78%	22,113	22.95%	2,193	2.27%	49,946	51.83%	96,365
Latah	10,669	52.14%	9,039	44.18%	753	3.68%	1,630	7.97%	20,461
Lemhi	3,716	76.24%	1,038	21.30%	120	2.46%	2,678	54.94%	4,874
Lewis	1,503	81.42%	305	16.52%	38	2.06%	1,198	64.90%	1,846
Lincoln	1,466	76.47%	392	20.45%	59	3.08%	1,074	56.02%	1,917
Madison	13,925	80.20%	2,767	15.94%	671	3.86%	11,158	64.26%	17,363
Minidoka	6,401	80.54%	1,373	17.27%	174	2.19%	5,028	63.27%	7,948
Nez Perce	13,707	68.08%	5,928	29.44%	500	2.48%	7,779	38.64%	20,135
Oneida	2,119	86.24%	253	10.30%	85	3.46%	1,866	75.94%	2,457
Owyhee	4,101	82.85%	756	15.27%	93	1.88%	3,345	67.58%	4,950
Payette	9,458	80.42%	2,064	17.55%	239	2.03%	7,394	62.87%	11,761
Power	2,146	71.04%	785	25.98%	90	2.98%	1,361	45.06%	3,021
Shoshone	4,500	73.39%	1,472	24.01%	160	2.60%	3,028	49.38%	6,132
Teton	3,005	44.86%	3,463	51.70%	230	3.44%	-458	-6.84%	6,698
Twin Falls	27,304	73.04%	9,064	24.25%	1,015	2.71%	18,240	48.79%	37,383
Valley	4,214	58.20%	2,869	39.63%	157	2.17%	1,345	18.57%	7,240
Washington	4,429	79.73%	1,010	18.18%	116	2.09%	3,419	61.55%	5,555
Totals	605,246	66.87%	274,972	30.38%	24,839	2.74%	330,274	36.49%	905,057

County that flipped from Democratic to Republican

- Latah (largest city: Moscow)

==== By congressional district ====
Trump won both congressional districts.

District	Trump	Harris	Representative
1st	71.29%	26.24%	Russ Fulcher
2nd	61.83%	35.11%	Mike Simpson

== Analysis ==
Trump flipped the Panhandle county of Latah, anchored by the college town of Moscow, becoming the first Republican to win the county since Bush in 2004; and with nearly an 8% margin of victory, having the best showing for a presidential candidate there since Bush's 16.3% margin in 2000. He also became the first Republican to win the White House without winning Teton County since it was established in 1915. He also recovered his margins in larger urban areas, winning Ada County — home to the state capital and largest city Boise — by a double-digit margin for the first time in his electoral history.

== See also ==
- United States presidential elections in Idaho
- 2024 United States presidential election
- 2024 Democratic Party presidential primaries
- 2024 Republican Party presidential primaries
- 2024 United States elections

== Notes ==
Partisan clients
