= 2024 United States presidential election in Washington (state) =

- November 5, 2024
- Turnout: 78.94% (of registered voters) (▼5.20 pp)

Nominee	Kamala Harris	Donald Trump
Party	Democratic	Republican
Home state	California	Florida
Running mate	Tim Walz	JD Vance
Electoral vote	12	0
Popular vote	2,245,849	1,530,923
Percentage	57.23%	39.01%

Harris
40–50%
50–60%
60–70%
70–80%
80–90%
90–100%
Trump
40–50%
50–60%
60–70%
70–80%
80–90%
90–100%
Tie/No data
President before election
Joe Biden
Democratic
Elected President
Donald Trump
Republican

The 2024 United States presidential election in Washington took place on Tuesday, November 5, 2024, as part of the 2024 United States presidential election in which all 50 states plus the District of Columbia participated. Washington voters chose electors to represent them in the Electoral College via a popular vote. It was held along a gubernatorial and U.S. Senate election. The state of Washington has 12 electoral votes in the Electoral College, following reapportionment due to the 2020 United States census in which the state neither gained nor lost a seat.

Although Washington was a Republican-leaning swing state until the 1980s, Democrats have won Washington in every presidential election starting in 1988 and have consistently done so by double digits since 2008. Washington is part of the Democratic-leaning West Coast and was predicted to go comfortably to the Democratic Party in 2024.

As expected, Kamala Harris comfortably won Washington state. While Trump improved his margin in all fifty states, Washington had the smallest swing to the right, with Trump improving his margin by 0.98%, compared to the national swing of about 6%. After Biden's 19% margin of victory in 2020, Harris' 18% margin was the second-largest in the state for the Democratic Party since 1964.

Some of the few counties in the country to swing significantly leftward were in Washington, including Clallam, Island, Jefferson, and Kitsap counties, where Harris had some of the best Democratic performances in their history. In the former bellwether Clallam County, Harris had the best performance for any candidate since 1984, and the best for any Democrat since 1964. This ended Clallam County's 40-year bellwether streak from 1980 to 2020, as the county had not voted for the losing presidential candidate since 1976.

Harris also outperformed Democratic gubernatorial nominee Bob Ferguson in the concurrent gubernatorial election. Ferguson won the governorship by 11.23 percentage points, while Harris carried Washington by 18.22 points. However, Harris slightly underperformed Maria Cantwell, who won by 18.45% in the concurrent U.S. Senate election.

== Primary election ==
=== Republican primary ===
The Washington Republican primary took place on March 12, 2024, alongside primaries in Hawaii, Idaho, Mississippi, and Missouri.

Washington Republican primary, March 12, 2024
Candidate	Votes	Percentage	Actual delegate count		
Candidate	Votes	Percentage	Bound	Unbound	Total
Donald Trump	601,070	76.43%	43	0	43
Nikki Haley (withdrawn)	151,485	19.26%	0	0	0
Ron DeSantis (withdrawn)	17,870	2.27%	0	0	0
Chris Christie (withdrawn)	8,702	1.11%	0	0	0
Vivek Ramaswamy (withdrawn)	7,318	0.93%	0	0	0
Total:	786,445	100.00%	43	0	43

=== Democratic primary ===
The Washington Democratic primary took place on March 12, 2024, alongside primaries in Democrats Abroad, Northern Marianas, Mississippi, and Georgia.

2024 Washington Democratic pres. primary
Candidate	Votes	%	Delegates
Joe Biden (incumbent)	763,739	83.47	90
Uncommitted Delegates	89,764	9.81	2
Marianne Williamson	25,308	2.77	0
Dean Phillips (withdrawn)	25,190	2.75	0
Write-in votes	10,966	1.20	—
Total	914,967	100%	92

== General election ==
In the early hours of October 28 a ballot drop box in Vancouver was found to be on fire damaging a number of ballots. Police stated that a suspicious device had been found next to the box.

=== Candidates ===
The following presidential candidates have received ballot access in Washington:

- Kamala Harris, Democratic Party
- Donald Trump, Republican Party
- Chase Oliver, Libertarian Party
- Jill Stein, Green Party
- Claudia De la Cruz, Party for Socialism and Liberation
- Cornel West, Independent
- Rachele Fruit, Socialist Workers Party
- Shiva Ayyadurai, Independent
- Joseph Kishore, Socialist Equality Party
- Robert F. Kennedy Jr., Independent (withdrawn)

=== Predictions ===
Source	Ranking	As of
Cook Political Report	Solid D	November 4, 2024
Inside Elections	Solid D	November 3, 2024
Sabato's Crystal Ball	Safe D	November 4, 2024
Decision Desk HQ/The Hill	Safe D	November 4, 2024
CNalysis	Solid D	November 4, 2024
CNN	Safe D	November 4, 2024
The Economist	Safe D	November 4, 2024
538	Solid D	November 4, 2024
RCP	Safe D	November 4, 2024
NBC News	Solid D	November 4, 2024

=== Polling ===
Kamala Harris vs. Donald Trump

Poll source	Date(s) administered	Sample size (Note: Key: A – all adults RV – registered voters LV – likely voters V – unclear)	Margin of error	Kamala Harris Democratic	Donald Trump Republican	Other / Undecided
Research Co.	November 2–3, 2024	450 (LV)	± 4.6%	54%	39%	7%
ActiVote	October 3–29, 2024	400 (LV)	± 4.9%	59%	41%	–
Public Policy Polling (D) (Note: This poll was sponsored by the Northwest Progressive Institute)	October 16–17, 2024	571 (LV)	± 4.1%	55%	40%	6%
Strategies 360 (Note: Poll sponsored by KOMO-TV)	October 11–16, 2024	600 (RV)	± 4.0%	55%	39%	6% (Note: "Another candidate" with 2%)
SurveyUSA (Note: Poll sponsored by The Seattle Times, KING-TV, & University of Washington Information School)	October 9–14, 2024	703 (LV)	± 4.9%	57%	35%	8%
ActiVote	September 7 – October 13, 2024	400 (LV)	± 4.9%	60%	40%	–
Elway Research (Note: Poll sponsored by Crosscut.com)	October 8–12, 2024	401 (RV)	± 5.0%	57%	32%	11%
Elway Research	September 3–6, 2024	403 (RV)	± 5.0%	53%	32%	11%
	July 21, 2024	Joe Biden announces his withdrawal from the race; Kamala Harris declares her candidacy for president.				
DHM Research	July 12–17, 2024	500 (RV)	± 4.4%	45%	40%	14% (Note: "Someone else" with 9%)
SurveyUSA	July 10–13, 2024	708 (LV)	± 5.0%	51%	36%	13%

Kamala Harris vs. Donald Trump vs Robert F. Kennedy Jr.

Poll source	Date(s) administered	Sample size	Margin of error	Kamala Harris Democratic	Donald Trump Republican	Robert F. Kennedy Jr. Independent	Other / Undecided
Public Policy Polling (D)	July 24–25, 2024	581 (LV)	± 4.0%	52%	38%	6%	4%

Hypothetical polling with Joe Biden and Donald Trump

Joe Biden vs. Donald Trump

Poll source	Date(s) administered	Sample size	Margin of error	Joe Biden Democratic	Donald Trump Republican	Other / Undecided
DHM Research	July 12–17, 2024	500 (RV)	± 4.4%	45%	38%	17% (Note: "Someone else" with 13%)
SurveyUSA	July 10–13, 2024	708 (LV)	± 5.0%	50%	36%	14%
Public Policy Polling (D)	May 15–16, 2024	615 (LV)	± 4.0%	55%	39%	6%
The Bullfinch Group (Note: Poll sponsored by The Independent Center)	April 16–23, 2024	250 (RV)	± 6.2%	45%	46%	9%
John Zogby Strategies (Note: Poll conducted for Kennedy's campaign)	April 13–21, 2024	418 (LV)	–	52%	40%	8%
Echelon Insights (Note: Poll sponsored by Concerned Taxpayers of Washington State PAC)	March 18–21, 2024	600 (RV)	± 4.7%	48%	37%	15%
Public Policy Polling (D)	February 13–14, 2024	797 (LV)	± 3.5%	54%	38%	8%
Public Policy Polling (D)	November 14–15, 2023	700 (LV)	± 3.7%	52%	38%	10%
Elway Research	October 30 – November 3, 2023	403 (RV)	± 5.0%	39%	29%	31% (Note: "Someone else" with 22%; "I would not vote" with 1%)
Public Policy Polling (D)	June 7–8, 2023	773 (LV)	± 3.5%	53%	36%	11%
Emerson College	September 30 – October 1, 2022	782 (LV)	± 3.4%	49%	39%	12%
McLaughlin & Associates (R)	August 15–17, 2022	500 (LV)	± 4.4%	54%	41%	6%

Joe Biden vs. Donald Trump vs. Robert F. Kennedy Jr. vs. Cornel West vs. Jill Stein

Poll source	Date(s) administered	Sample size	Margin of error	Joe Biden Democratic	Donald Trump Republican	Robert F. Kennedy Jr. Independent	Cornel West Independent	Jill Stein Green	Other / Undecided
Elway Research	May 13–16, 2024	403 (RV)	± 5.0%	42%	34%	3%	1%	0%	17%
The Bullfinch Group	April 16–23, 2024	250 (RV)	± 6.2%	35%	40%	13%	1%	4%	8%
Elway Research	October 30 – November 3, 2023	403 (RV)	± 5.0%	37%	25%	9%	3%	–	26% (Note: "Someone else" with 11%; "I would not vote" with 2%)

Hypothetical polling with other candidates

Joe Biden vs. Robert F. Kennedy Jr.

Poll source	Date(s) administered	Sample size	Margin of error	Joe Biden Democratic	Robert F. Kennedy Jr. Independent	Other / Undecided
John Zogby Strategies	April 13–21, 2024	418 (LV)	–	45%	45%	10%

Robert F. Kennedy Jr. vs. Donald Trump

Poll source	Date(s) administered	Sample size	Margin of error	Robert F. Kennedy Jr. Independent	Donald Trump Republican	Other / Undecided
John Zogby Strategies	April 13–21, 2024	418 (LV)	–	49%	31%	20%

Gretchen Whitmer vs. Donald Trump

Poll source	Date(s) administered	Sample size	Margin of error	Gretchen Whitmer Democratic	Donald Trump Republican	Other / Undecided
DHM Research	July 12–17, 2024	500 (RV)	± 4.4%	42%	38%	20% (Note: "Someone else" with 10%)

Josh Shapiro vs. Donald Trump

Poll source	Date(s) administered	Sample size	Margin of error	Josh Shapiro Democratic	Donald Trump Republican	Other / Undecided
DHM Research	July 12–17, 2024	500 (RV)	± 4.4%	40%	38%	22%

Raphael Warnock vs. Donald Trump

Poll source	Date(s) administered	Sample size	Margin of error	Raphael Warnock Democratic	Donald Trump Republican	Other / Undecided
DHM Research	July 12–17, 2024	500 (RV)	± 4.4%	40%	37%	23% (Note: "Someone else" with 12%)

Joe Biden vs. Ron DeSantis

Poll source	Date(s) administered	Sample size	Margin of error	Joe Biden Democratic	Ron DeSantis Republican	Other / Undecided
Public Policy Polling (D)	June 7–8, 2023	773 (LV)	± 3.5%	51%	39%	10%

=== Results ===
State legislative district results

2024 United States presidential election in Washington
Party	Candidate	Votes	%	±%
Democratic	Kamala Harris; Tim Walz	2,245,849	57.23%	▼0.74%
Republican	Donald Trump; JD Vance	1,530,923	39.01%	▲0.24%
We the People	Robert F. Kennedy Jr. (withdrawn); Nicole Shanahan (withdrawn)	54,868	1.40%	N/A
Green	Jill Stein; Butch Ware	29,754	0.76%	▲0.31%
Libertarian	Chase Oliver; Mike ter Maat	16,428	0.42%	▼1.55%
Socialism and Liberation	Claudia De la Cruz Karina Garcia	8,695	0.22%	▲0.10%
Justice for All	Cornel West; Melina Abdullah	7,254	0.18%	N/A
Independent	Shiva Ayyadurai; Crystal Ellis	3,323	0.08%	N/A
Socialist Equality	Joseph Kishore Jerome White	917	0.02%	N/A
Socialist Workers	Rachele Fruit Dennis Richter	824	0.02%	▼0.04%
Write-in		25,408	0.65%	▼0.02%
Total votes		3,924,243	100.00%	N/A

==== By county ====
County	Kamala Harris Democratic		Donald Trump Republican		Various candidates Other parties		Margin		Total
County	#	%	#	%	#	%	#	%	Total
Adams	1,455	27.12%	3,767	70.21%	143	2.67%	-2,312	-43.09%	5,365
Asotin	4,082	35.59%	7,004	61.07%	382	3.33%	-2,922	-25.48%	11,468
Benton	37,662	37.40%	59,555	59.15%	3,476	3.45%	-21,893	-21.74%	100,693
Chelan	18,397	43.60%	22,363	53.00%	1,431	3.39%	-3,966	-9.40%	42,191
Clallam	25,440	52.28%	21,632	44.45%	1,591	3.27%	3,808	7.83%	48,663
Clark	143,206	51.78%	123,998	44.83%	9,374	3.39%	19,208	6.94%	276,578
Columbia	661	26.60%	1,737	69.90%	87	3.50%	-1,076	-43.30%	2,485
Cowlitz	22,825	38.47%	34,580	58.29%	1,920	3.24%	-11,755	-19.81%	59,325
Douglas	7,410	34.98%	13,095	61.82%	677	3.20%	-5,685	-26.84%	21,182
Ferry	1,315	31.93%	2,667	64.75%	137	3.33%	-1,352	-32.82%	4,119
Franklin	11,884	37.26%	19,086	59.84%	927	2.91%	-7,202	-22.58%	31,897
Garfield	330	24.41%	973	71.97%	49	3.62%	-643	-47.56%	1,352
Grant	10,806	29.81%	24,326	67.10%	1,121	3.09%	-13,520	-37.29%	36,253
Grays Harbor	17,161	45.41%	19,432	51.42%	1,200	3.18%	-2,271	-6.01%	37,793
Island	29,595	56.43%	20,967	39.98%	1,887	3.60%	8,628	16.45%	52,449
Jefferson	17,459	70.69%	6,324	25.61%	915	3.70%	11,135	45.08%	24,698
King	832,606	73.65%	252,193	22.31%	45,703	4.04%	580,413	51.34%	1,130,502
Kitsap	91,731	58.48%	59,080	37.66%	6,061	3.86%	32,651	20.81%	156,872
Kittitas	10,810	40.79%	14,645	55.27%	1,044	3.94%	-3,835	-14.47%	26,499
Klickitat	5,917	43.48%	7,178	52.75%	512	3.76%	-1,261	-9.27%	13,607
Lewis	14,433	31.83%	29,322	64.67%	1,583	3.49%	-14,889	-32.84%	45,338
Lincoln	1,678	23.49%	5,272	73.80%	194	2.72%	-3,594	-50.31%	7,144
Mason	17,215	46.92%	18,127	49.41%	1,347	3.67%	-912	-2.49%	36,689
Okanogan	8,466	40.84%	11,555	55.74%	711	3.43%	-3,089	-14.90%	20,732
Pacific	6,825	47.91%	7,010	49.21%	409	2.87%	-185	-1.30%	14,244
Pend Oreille	2,461	28.80%	5,826	68.18%	258	3.02%	-3,365	-39.38%	8,545
Pierce	235,169	53.50%	188,194	42.81%	16,218	3.69%	46,975	10.69%	439,581
San Juan	9,539	73.34%	2,890	22.22%	577	4.44%	6,649	51.12%	13,006
Skagit	36,956	52.60%	30,765	43.79%	2,535	3.61%	6,191	8.81%	70,256
Skamania	3,147	42.79%	3,961	53.85%	247	3.36%	-814	-11.07%	7,355
Snohomish	240,099	57.41%	161,371	38.59%	16,751	4.01%	78,728	18.82%	418,221
Spokane	131,163	45.69%	145,338	50.63%	10,581	3.69%	-14,175	-4.94%	287,082
Stevens	7,492	26.52%	19,895	70.43%	859	3.04%	-12,403	-43.91%	28,246
Thurston	95,663	58.14%	62,282	37.85%	6,592	4.01%	33,381	20.29%	164,537
Wahkiakum	1,204	39.32%	1,757	57.38%	101	3.30%	-553	-18.06%	3,062
Walla Walla	13,106	44.32%	15,476	52.34%	986	3.33%	-2,370	-8.02%	29,568
Whatcom	83,295	60.42%	49,213	35.70%	5,360	3.89%	34,082	24.72%	137,868
Whitman	10,480	52.33%	8,699	43.44%	848	4.23%	1,781	8.89%	20,027
Yakima	36,706	41.36%	49,368	55.63%	2,677	3.02%	-12,662	-14.27%	88,751
Totals	2,245,849	57.23%	1,530,923	39.01%	147,471	3.76%	714,926	18.22%	3,924,243

==== By congressional district ====
Harris won seven of ten congressional districts. Trump won three congressional districts, including one that elected a Democrat.

District	Harris	Trump	Representative
1st	62.15%	33.68%	Suzan DelBene
2nd	59.84%	36.33%	Rick Larsen
3rd	46.67%	49.95%	Marie Gluesenkamp Perez
4th	38.11%	58.66%	Dan Newhouse
5th	42.85%	53.56%	Cathy McMorris Rodgers (118th Congress)
5th	42.85%	53.56%	Michael Baumgartner (119th Congress)
6th	57.72%	38.56%	Derek Kilmer (118th Congress)
6th	57.72%	38.56%	Emily Randall (119th Congress)
7th	85.32%	10.78%	Pramila Jayapal
8th	50.93%	45.20%	Kim Schrier
9th	68.44%	27.49%	Adam Smith
10th	57.04%	39.14%	Marilyn Strickland

== Analysis ==
Washington was the sixth-most Democratic state in the election behind Vermont, Maryland, Massachusetts, Hawaii, and California; the latter five states voted for Harris by more than 20%. This was the first election since 1956 in which Washington voted to the left of New York (which had the largest swing to the right in this election).

Washington was one of eleven states where Trump received fewer votes in this election than in 2020. (Note: The other states were Alaska, Arkansas, Hawaii, Indiana, Kansas, Louisiana, Mississippi, Oregon, West Virginia, and Wyoming.) The reason for all of their rightward swings is that Harris lost an even greater number of votes compared to Biden's 2020 run. With this election, Clallam County ended its 40-year bellwether streak, voting for the losing presidential candidate for the first time since 1976; Trump thus became the first Republican to win the White House without carrying this county since Richard Nixon in 1968. This was also the first time since 1896 that an unsuccessful Democrat won a majority of the county's vote. It had previously been the only county in the nation to vote for every presidential election winner since 1980.

== See also ==
- 2024 Washington Initiative 2109 (a ballot initiative in Washington state on the same day)
- United States presidential elections in Washington (state)
- 2024 United States presidential election
- 2024 Democratic Party presidential primaries
- 2024 Republican Party presidential primaries
- 2024 United States elections

== Notes ==
Partisan clients
