= 2024 United States presidential election in Hawaii =

- November 5, 2024
- Turnout: 60.7% ▼

Nominee	Kamala Harris	Donald Trump
Party	Democratic	Republican
Home state	California	Florida
Running mate	Tim Walz	JD Vance
Electoral vote	4	0
Popular vote	313,044	193,661
Percentage	60.59%	37.48%

Harris
40–50%
50–60%
60–70%
70–80%
80–90%
90–100%
Trump
40–50%
50–60%
60–70%
90–100%
No data
President before election
Joe Biden
Democratic
Elected President
Donald Trump
Republican

The 2024 United States presidential election in Hawaii took place on Tuesday, November 5, 2024, as part of the 2024 United States presidential election in which all 50 states plus the District of Columbia participated. Hawaii voters chose electors to represent them in the Electoral College via a popular vote. The state of Hawaii has four electoral votes in the Electoral College, following reapportionment due to the 2020 United States census in which the state neither gained nor lost a seat.

Hawaii is a Pacific island state with its culture distinct from that of the U.S. mainland and its population has an Asian American plurality, unique among the 50 states. Hawaii has only voted Republican in two presidential elections since gaining statehood, in 1972 and 1984; nevertheless, its support for the Democratic Party has gradually declined after reaching a peak in 2008.

Although Harris won the state comfortably, Donald Trump received the highest vote percentage for a Republican since 2004, narrowing the margin by over 6% compared to 2020.

Hawaii is just 23% White, and has the highest percentage of Asian Americans of any state, highlighting the swing of Asian voters towards Republicans in this election, though Harris still won Asian voters overall. This was also the first time since 2004 that the Democratic candidate failed to receive 60% of the vote in all of Hawaii's counties.

== Primary elections ==
=== Democratic caucuses ===
The Hawaii Democratic caucuses were held on March 6, 2024.

2024 Hawaii Democratic pres. caucus
Candidate	Votes	%	Delegates
Joe Biden (incumbent)	1,047	65.97	15
Uncommitted	463	29.17	7
Marianne Williamson	50	3.15	0
Dean Phillips (withdrawn)	16	1.01	0
Jason Palmer	6	0.38	0
Armando Perez-Serrato	5	0.32	0
Total	1,587	100%	22

=== Republican caucuses ===
The Hawaii Republican caucuses was held on March 12, 2024, alongside primaries in Idaho, Mississippi, Missouri, and Washington.

Hawaii Republican caucuses, March 12, 2024
Candidate	Votes	Percentage	Actual delegate count		
Candidate	Votes	Percentage	Bound	Unbound	Total
Donald Trump	4,348	97.08%	19	0	19
Nikki Haley (withdrawn)	68	1.52%	0	0	0
Vivek Ramaswamy (withdrawn)	26	0.58%	0	0	0
Ron DeSantis (withdrawn)	25	0.56%	0	0	0
Chris Christie (withdrawn)	8	0.18%	0	0	0
Ryan Binkley (withdrawn)	2	0.04%	0	0	0
Doug Burgum (withdrawn)	1	0.02%	0	0	0
David Stuckenberg	1	0.02%	0	0	0
Total:	4,479	100.00%	19	0	19

== General election ==
The Democratic Party of Hawaii attempted to disqualify the "ballot access petition" for Kennedy's newly created party, the We the People Party, on the November ballot, though the attempt was unsuccessful.

=== Predictions ===
Source	Ranking	As of
The Cook Political Report	Solid D	December 19, 2023
Inside Elections	Solid D	April 26, 2023
Sabato's Crystal Ball	Safe D	June 29, 2023
Decision Desk HQ/The Hill	Safe D	December 14, 2023
CNalysis	Solid D	December 30, 2023
CNN	Solid D	January 14, 2024
The Economist	Safe D	June 12, 2024
538	Solid D	June 11, 2024
RCP	Solid D	June 26, 2024
NBC News	Safe D	October 6, 2024

=== Polling ===
Hypothetical polling with Joe Biden and Donald Trump

Joe Biden vs. Donald Trump

Poll source	Date(s) administered	Sample size (Note: Key: A – all adults RV – registered voters LV – likely voters V – unclear)	Margin of error	Joe Biden Democratic	Donald Trump Republican	Other / Undecided
The Bullfinch Group (Note: Poll sponsored by The Independent Center)	April 16–23, 2024	250 (RV)	± 6.2%	57%	38%	5%
John Zogby Strategies (Note: Poll conducted for Kennedy's campaign)	April 13–21, 2024	301 (LV)	–	55%	34%	11%

Joe Biden vs. Donald Trump vs. Robert F. Kennedy Jr. vs. Cornel West vs. Jill Stein

Poll source	Date(s) administered	Sample size	Margin of error	Joe Biden Democratic	Donald Trump Republican	Robert F. Kennedy Jr. Independent	Cornel West Independent	Jill Stein Green	Other / Undecided
The Bullfinch Group	April 16–23, 2024	250 (RV)	± 6.2%	42%	34%	8%	3%	0%	13%

Hypothetical polling with other candidates

Joe Biden vs. Robert F. Kennedy Jr.

Poll source	Date(s) administered	Sample size	Margin of error	Joe Biden Democratic	Robert F. Kennedy Jr. Independent	Other / Undecided
John Zogby Strategies	April 13–21, 2024	301 (LV)	–	42%	48%	10%

Robert F. Kennedy Jr. vs. Donald Trump

Poll source	Date(s) administered	Sample size	Margin of error	Robert F. Kennedy Jr. Independent	Donald Trump Republican	Other / Undecided
John Zogby Strategies	April 13–21, 2024	301 (LV)	–	50%	27%	23%

=== Results ===
State House district results: Trump 50–60% / Harris 50–60% 60–70% 70–80%

2024 United States presidential election in Hawaii
Party	Candidate	Votes	%	±%
Democratic	Kamala Harris; Tim Walz	313,044	60.59%	−3.14%
Republican	Donald Trump; JD Vance	193,661	37.48%	+3.21%
Green	Jill Stein; Butch Ware	4,387	0.85%	+0.18%
Libertarian	Chase Oliver; Mike ter Maat	2,733	0.53%	−0.43%
Socialism and Liberation	Claudia De la Cruz; Karina Garcia	1,940	0.38%	N/A
American Solidarity	Peter Sonski; Lauren Onak	936	0.18%	N/A
Total votes		516,701	100.00%	N/A

==== By county ====
County	Kamala Harris Democratic		Donald Trump Republican		Various candidates Other parties		Margin		Total
County	#	%	#	%	#	%	#	%	Total
Hawaii	52,163	62.98%	28,748	34.71%	1,912	2.31%	23,415	28.27%	82,823
Honolulu	204,301	59.93%	130,489	38.28%	6,131	1.79%	73,812	21.65%	340,921
Kalawao	15	83.33%	3	16.67%	0	0.00%	12	66.66%	18
Kauaʻi	17,675	58.79%	11,803	39.26%	586	1.95%	5,872	19.53%	30,064
Maui	38,890	61.85%	22,618	35.97%	1,367	2.17%	16,272	25.89%	62,875
Totals	313,044	60.59%	193,661	37.48%	9,996	1.93%	119,383	23.11%	516,701

==== By congressional district ====
Harris won both congressional districts.

District	Harris	Trump	Representative
1st	61.50%	36.77%	Ed Case
2nd	59.73%	38.14%	Jill Tokuda

== Analysis ==
Hawaii has historically been one of the most liberal states in the country. In the 2024 election, despite an overwhelming majority for the Democratic candidate, votes in Hawaii shifted noticeably to the right, with every county swinging by over 5%. Trump's margin was the best out of his three runs, having increased in every consecutive election. Trump's increased success in Hawaii was attributed by local political scientists to the state's extremely high cost of living, with former blue-collar plantation households in Western Oahu responsible for some of Trump's strongest gains in the state. Republican gains were also attributed to Hawaii's reluctance to embrace progressivism; and the local populace has been described by academics and political analysts as being significantly less progressive than other blue states.

As the only state with a plurality of Asian ethnicity, Hawaii was affected by a large national shift to the right among Asian-American voters, especially Filipino Americans, who represent one of the largest Asian groups in Hawaii. Filipino Americans shifted to Trump in part because of concern over China's Navy being close to the Philippines in the South China Sea and a perception of Biden and the Democratic Party as ineffective against China's aggression.

== See also ==
- United States presidential elections in Hawaii
- 2024 Democratic Party presidential primaries
- 2024 Republican Party presidential primaries
- 2024 United States elections

== Notes ==
Partisan clients
