= 2024 Georgia Republican presidential primary =

- March 12, 2024

59 Republican National Convention delegates

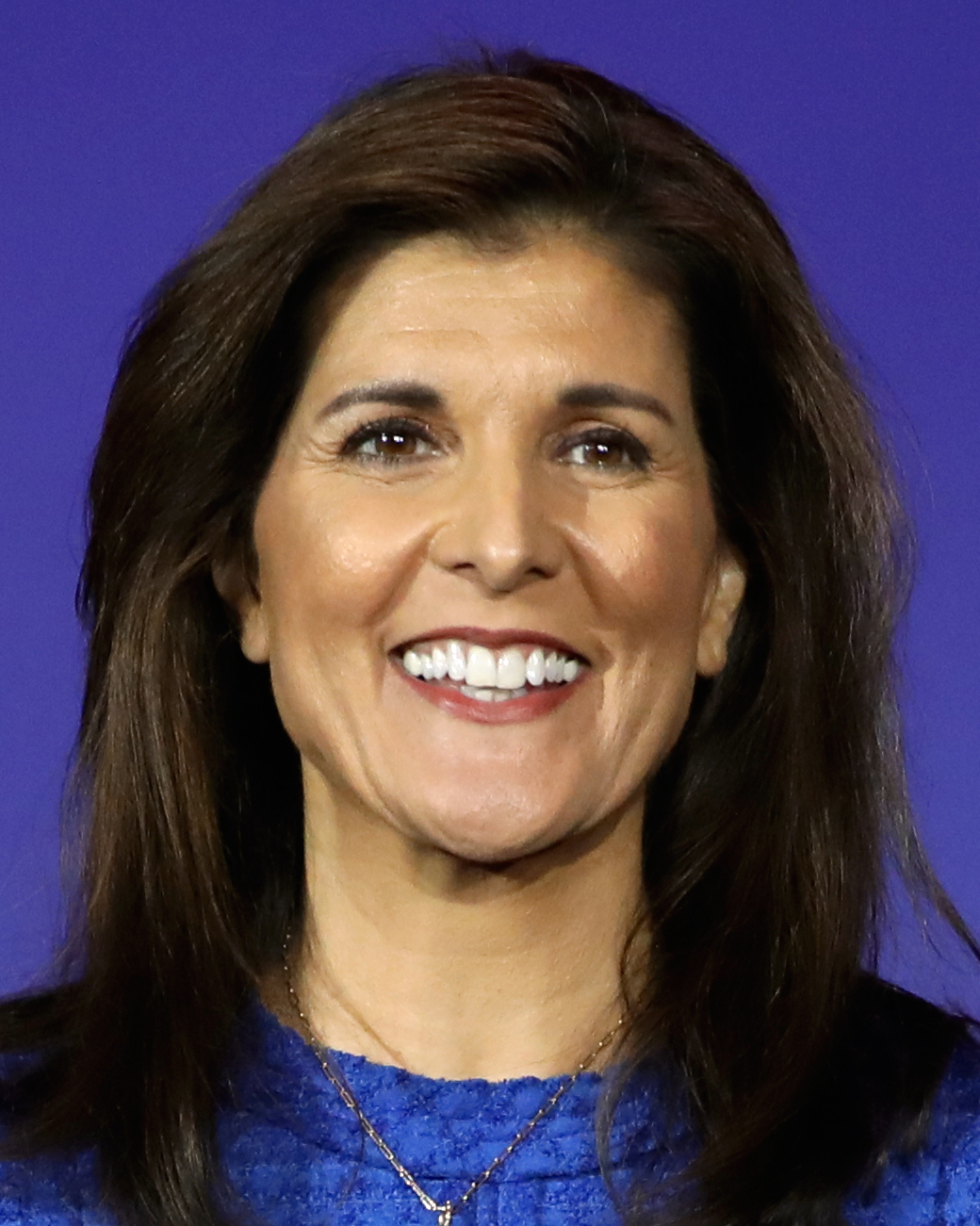
Candidate	Donald Trump	Nikki Haley (withdrawn)
Home state	Florida	South Carolina
Delegate count	59	0
Popular vote	497,594	77,902
Percentage	84.49%	13.23%

Trump
50–60%
60–70%
70–80%
80–90%
>90%

The 2024 Georgia Republican presidential primary election was held on March 12, 2024, as part of the Republican Party primaries for the 2024 presidential election. 59 delegates to the 2024 Republican National Convention were allocated on a winner-take-all basis.

The contest was held alongside primaries in Hawaii, Mississippi, and Washington.

== Candidates ==
The following candidates officially filed by the end of the filing deadline on November 12, 2023:

- Donald Trump
- David Stuckenberg
- Ryan Binkley (withdrawn)
- Nikki Haley (withdrawn)
- Doug Burgum (withdrawn)
- Chris Christie (withdrawn)
- Ron DeSantis (withdrawn)
- Asa Hutchinson (withdrawn)
- Perry Johnson (withdrawn)
- Vivek Ramaswamy (withdrawn)
- Tim Scott (withdrawn)

== Endorsements ==
Ron DeSantis (withdrawn)

U.S. Representative

- Rich McCormick, GA-06 (2023–present)

State representative

- Jodi Lott, District 131 (2023–present), District 122 (2015–2023)
Donald Trump

U.S. Representatives

- Buddy Carter, GA-01 (2015–present)
- Andrew Clyde, GA-09 (2021–present)
- Mike Collins, GA-10 (2023–present)
- Marjorie Taylor Greene, GA-14 (2021–present)

State executive officials

- Burt Jones, Lieutenant Governor (2023–present)
- Bubba McDonald, Member of the Georgia Public Service Commission from the 4th District (2009–present, 1998–2003)

State senator

- Brandon Beach, District 21 (2013–present)
Declined to endorse

Governor

- Brian Kemp, Governor of Georgia (2019–present)

== Maps ==
Endorsements by incumbent Republicans in the Georgia State Senate. Endorsed Donald Trump (16) No endorsement (17)

== Results ==
Georgia Republican primary, March 12, 2024
Candidate	Votes	Percentage	Actual delegate count		
Candidate	Votes	Percentage	Bound	Unbound	Total
Donald Trump	497,594	84.49%	59	0	59
Nikki Haley (withdrawn)	77,902	13.23%	0	0	0
Ron DeSantis (withdrawn)	7,457	1.27%	0	0	0
Chris Christie (withdrawn)	2,054	0.35%	0	0	0
Tim Scott (withdrawn)	1,398	0.24%	0	0	0
Vivek Ramaswamy (withdrawn)	1,244	0.21%	0	0	0
Asa Hutchinson (withdrawn)	383	0.07%	0	0	0
Ryan Binkley (withdrawn)	377	0.06%	0	0	0
David Stuckenberg	243	0.04%	0	0	0
Doug Burgum (withdrawn)	161	0.03%	0	0	0
Perry Johnson (withdrawn)	134	0.02%	0	0	0
Total:	588,947	100.00%	59	0	59

== Polling ==
States polled	Dates administered	Dates updated	Nikki Haley	Donald Trump	Other/ Undecided (Note: Calculated by taking the difference of 100% and all other candidates combined.)	Margin
FiveThirtyEight	through February 4, 2024	March 5, 2024	16.3%	81.1%	2.6%	Trump +64.8

Poll source	Date(s) administered	Sample size (Note: Key: A – all adults RV – registered voters LV – likely voters V – unclear)	Margin of error	Doug Burgum	Chris Christie	Ron DeSantis	Nikki Haley	Asa Hutchinson	Mike Pence	Vivek Ramaswamy	Tim Scott	Donald Trump	Other	Undecided
CNN/SSRS	Nov 30 – Dec 7, 2023	522 (LV)	± 3.3%	–	4%	17%	17%	1%	–	3%	–	55%	2% (Note: "Other" with 1%)	2%
CNN/SSRS	Nov 30 – Dec 7, 2023	522 (LV)	± 3.3%	–	37%	–	–	–	–	–	–	61%	–	2%
CNN/SSRS	Nov 30 – Dec 7, 2023	522 (LV)	± 3.3%	–	–	31%	–	–	–	–	–	69%	–	–
Morning Consult	Nov 1–30, 2023	1,477 (LV)	–	0%	2%	14%	10%	0%	–	6%	1%	66%	–	1%
Morning Consult	Oct 1–31, 2023	1,525 (LV)	–	0%	2%	15%	6%	0%	3%	8%	2%	63%	0% (Note: Will Hurd with 0%)	1%
Zogby Analytics	Oct 9–12, 2023	273 (LV)	± 3.9%	–	3%	10%	9%	–	5%	7%	5%	55%	–	6%
Morning Consult	Sep 1–30, 2023	1,452 (LV)	–	–	1%	15%	6%	1%	4%	10%	3%	61%	0% (Note: Will Hurd with 0%)	–
20/20 Insights	Sep 25–28, 2023	245 (LV)	± 6.3%	0%	4%	16%	7%	0%	4%	3%	2%	58%	–	6%
Morning Consult	Aug 1–31, 2023	1,599 (LV)	–	0%	1%	14%	4%	0%	5%	10%	3%	62%	0% (Note: Will Hurd and Francis Suarez with 0%)	1%
University of Georgia	Aug 16–23, 2023	807 (LV)	± 3.4%	0%	2%	15%	3%	0%	4%	3%	3%	57%	1% (Note: Francis Suarez with 1%; Will Hurd and Larry Elder with 0%)	14%
Morning Consult	July 1–31, 2023	1,633 (LV)	–	0%	1%	19%	3%	0%	6%	9%	3%	57%	1% (Note: Will Hurd with 1%; Francis Suarez with 0%)	1%
Morning Consult	June 1–30, 2023	1,599 (LV)	–	0%	2%	22%	3%	1%	6%	3%	3%	58%	0% (Note: Liz Cheney and Greg Abbott with 0%)	2%
Morning Consult	May 1–31, 2023	1,470 (LV)	–	–	–	21%	3%	0%	6%	3%	2%	61%	1% (Note: Liz Cheney with 1%; Greg Abbott, Glenn Youngkin, and Kristi Noem with 0%)	3%
Landmark Communications	May 14, 2023	800 (LV)	± 3.5%	–	2%	32%	6%	–	2%	2%	2%	40%	7% (Note: Brian Kemp with 7%)	6%
Morning Consult	Apr 1–30, 2023	1,403 (LV)	–	–	–	22%	4%	0%	7%	3%	2%	58%	4% (Note: Liz Cheney and Glenn Youngkin with 1%; Greg Abbott, Mike Pompeo, and Kristi Noem with 0%)	2%
University of Georgia	Apr 2–12, 2023	983 (LV)	± 3.1%	–	–	30%	4%	–	2%	–	1%	51%	3% (Note: Liz Cheney with 2%; Mike Pompeo with 1%)	7%
University of Georgia	Apr 2–12, 2023	983 (LV)	± 3.1%	–	–	41%	–	–	–	–	–	51%	–	-
Morning Consult	Mar 1–31, 2023	1,426 (LV)	–	–	–	29%	4%	–	8%	1%	1%	53%	3% (Note: Mike Pompeo, Liz Cheney, and Glenn Youngkin with 1%; Greg Abbott and Kristi Noem with 0%)	1%
Morning Consult	Feb 1–28, 2023	1,280 (LV)	–	–	–	32%	5%	–	7%	0%	2%	50%	4% (Note: Greg Abbott, Ted Cruz, Liz Cheney, and Glenn Youngkin with 1%; Mike Pompeo and Kristi Noem with 0%)	-
Morning Consult	Jan 1–31, 2023	1,714 (LV)	–	–	–	33%	3%	–	8%	–	1%	50%	6% (Note: Ted Cruz and Liz Cheney with 2%; and Mike Pompeo and Kristi Noem with 1%; Greg Abbott and Glenn Youngkin with 0%)	-
Morning Consult	Dec 1–31, 2022	972 (LV)	–	–	–	35%	3%	–	8%	–	1%	47%	3% (Note: Ted Cruz, Liz Cheney, and Mike Pompeo with 1%; Kristi Noem, Greg Abbott, and Glenn Youngkin with 0%)	3%
WPA Intelligence (Note: Poll sponsored by Club for Growth)	Nov 11–13, 2022	843 (LV)	± 3.4%	–	–	55%	–	–	–	–	–	35%	–	10%
	Nov 8, 2022	2022 midterm elections												
Echelon Insights	Oct 31 – Nov 2, 2022	219 (LV)	± 5.4%	–	–	52%	–	–	–	–	–	36%	–	12%
Echelon Insights	Aug 31 – Sep 7, 2022	337 (LV)	± 4.4%	–	–	37%	–	–	–	–	–	54%	–	9%
Phillips Academy	Aug 3–7, 2022	371 (RV)	± 5.1%	–	–	29%	–	–	9%	–	–	54%	–	8%
John Bolton Super PAC	Jul 22–24, 2022	163 (LV)	–	–	5%	36%	–	–	6%	–	–	29%	16% (Note: Liz Cheney with 8%; Ted Cruz with 5%; Marco Rubio with 2%; Mike Pompeo with 1%)	19%
Spry Strategies	Apr 6–10, 2022	600 (LV)	± 4.0%	–	–	20%	6%	–	5%	–	1%	43%	11% (Note: Ted Cruz with 6%; Kristi Noem and Mike Pompeo with 2%)	15%
Spry Strategies	Apr 6–10, 2022	600 (LV)	± 4.0%	–	39%	6%	–	7%	–	2%	–	15% (Note: Ted Cruz with 9%; Mike Pompeo with 4%; Kristi Noem with 2%)	31%	
Trafalgar Group (R)	Mar 7–9, 2021	– (LV) (Note: Likely Republican primary voter subsample of 1,093 likely general election voters)	–	–	–	–	–	–	–	–	–	70%	18% (Note: "Would vote for anyone other than Trump" with 14%; would not vote with 4%)	12%
	Jan 20, 2021	Inauguration of Joe Biden												
University of Nevada/BUSR	Dec 30, 2020 – Jan 3, 2021	209 (LV)	± 7.0%	–	1%	–	3%	–	–	–	–	73%	12% (Note: Ted Cruz with 5%; Marco Rubio with 3%; Mitt Romney with 2%; "Other" with 2%)	–
University of Nevada/BUSR	Dec 30, 2020 – Jan 3, 2021	209 (LV)	± 7.0%	-	1%	–	8%	–	36%	–	–	–	31% (Note: Ted Cruz with 15%; Mitt Romney with 6%; Marco Rubio with 3%; "Other" with 7%)	24%

== See also ==
- 2024 Georgia Democratic presidential primary
- 2024 Republican Party presidential primaries
- 2024 United States presidential election
- 2024 United States presidential election in Georgia
- 2024 United States elections

== Notes ==
Partisan clients
