= 2024 Washington Republican presidential primary =

- March 12, 2024

43 Republican National Convention delegates

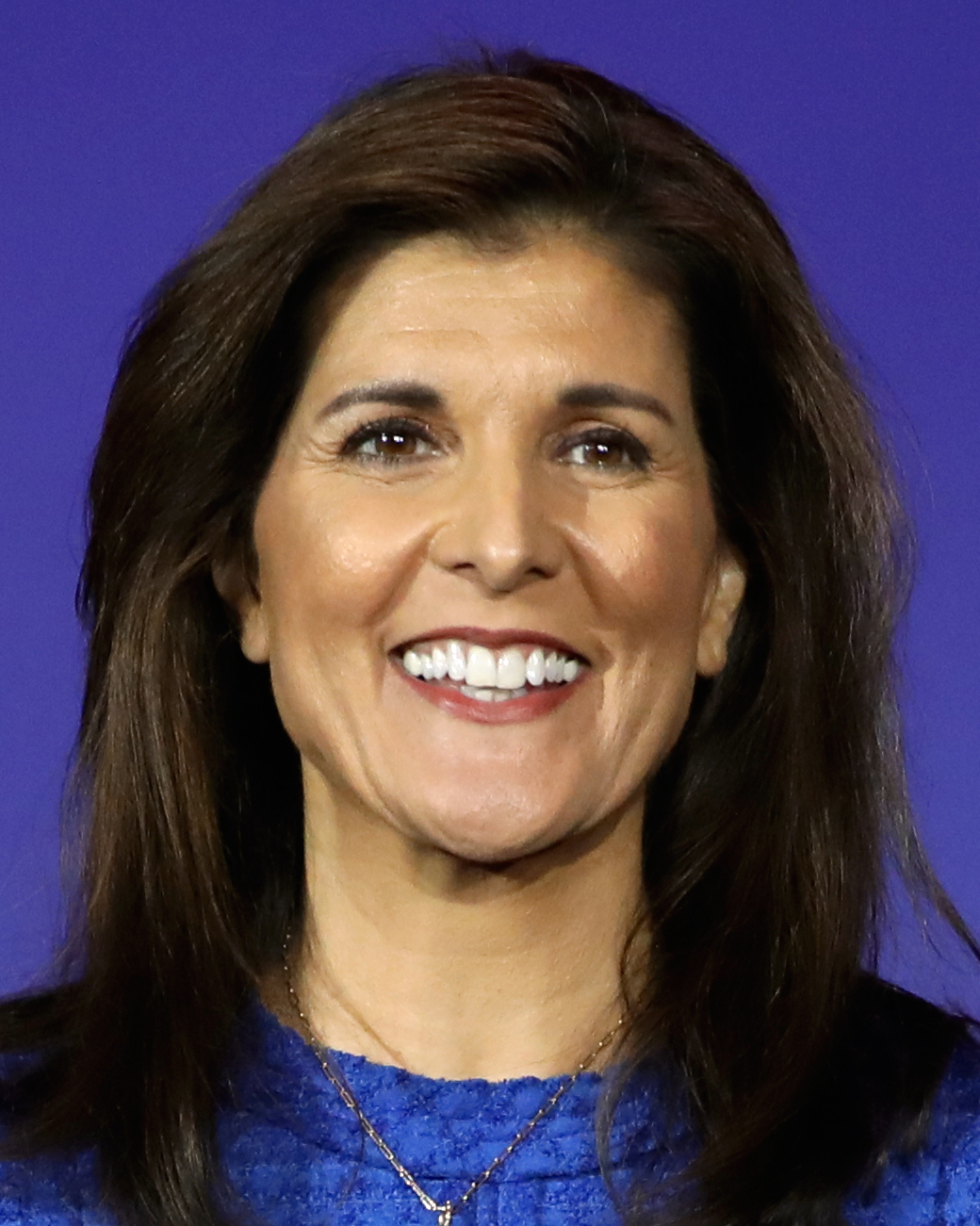
Candidate	Donald Trump	Nikki Haley (withdrawn)
Home state	Florida	South Carolina
Delegate count	43	0
Popular vote	601,070	151,485
Percentage	76.43%	19.26%

Trump
50–60%
60–70%
70–80%
80–90%

The 2024 Washington Republican presidential primary were held on March 12, 2024, as part of the Republican Party primaries for the 2024 presidential election. 43 delegates to the 2024 Republican National Convention were allocated on a proportional basis. The contest was held alongside primaries in Georgia, Hawaii, and Mississippi.

Washington was the tipping point state which brought the delegates pledged to Donald Trump to a majority, securing the former president the Republican nomination for the third consecutive time, and making Trump the only person apart from Richard Nixon to be the Republican nominee more than twice.

== Endorsements ==
Ron DeSantis (withdrawn)

State senator

- Phil Fortunato, District 31 (2017–present)

State representative

- Chris Corry, District 14 (2019–present)

Mayor

- Dick Muri, Steilacoom (2021–present)
Nikki Haley (withdrawn)

State senators

- Judy Warnick, District 13 (2015–present)
- Keith Wagoner, District 39 (2018–present)

State representatives

- Paul Harris, District 17 (2011–present)
- Drew Stokesbary, District 31; Minority Leader Washington House of Representatives (2023–present)
- Jacquelin Maycumber, District 7; (2017–present)

Party official

- Diane Tebelius, former chair of the Washington State Republican Party (2006–2007)
Donald Trump

Notable individuals

- Joe Kent, Republican nominee for U.S. Representative from WA-03 in 2022

== Polling ==
Poll source	Date(s) administered	Sample size (Note: Key: A – all adults RV – registered voters LV – likely voters V – unclear)	Margin of error	Chris Christie	Ron DeSantis	Nikki Haley	Vivek Ramaswamy	Donald Trump	Other	Undecided
Civiqs (D) (Note: Poll sponsored by the Northwest Progressive Institute)	February 20–23, 2024	522 (LV)	± 5.5%	1%	7%	8%	1%	77%	6%	

== Results ==
Washington Republican primary, March 12, 2024
Candidate	Votes	Percentage	Actual delegate count		
Candidate	Votes	Percentage	Bound	Unbound	Total
Donald Trump	601,070	76.43%	43	0	43
Nikki Haley (withdrawn)	151,485	19.26%	0	0	0
Ron DeSantis (withdrawn)	17,870	2.27%	0	0	0
Chris Christie (withdrawn)	8,702	1.11%	0	0	0
Vivek Ramaswamy (withdrawn)	7,318	0.93%	0	0	0
Total:	786,445	100.00%	43	0	43

== See also ==
- 2024 Republican Party presidential primaries
- 2024 Washington Democratic presidential primary
- 2024 United States presidential election
- 2024 United States presidential election in Washington (state)
- 2024 United States elections

== Notes ==
Partisan clients
