= 2024 Hawaii Republican presidential caucuses =

- March 12, 2024

19 Republican National Convention delegates

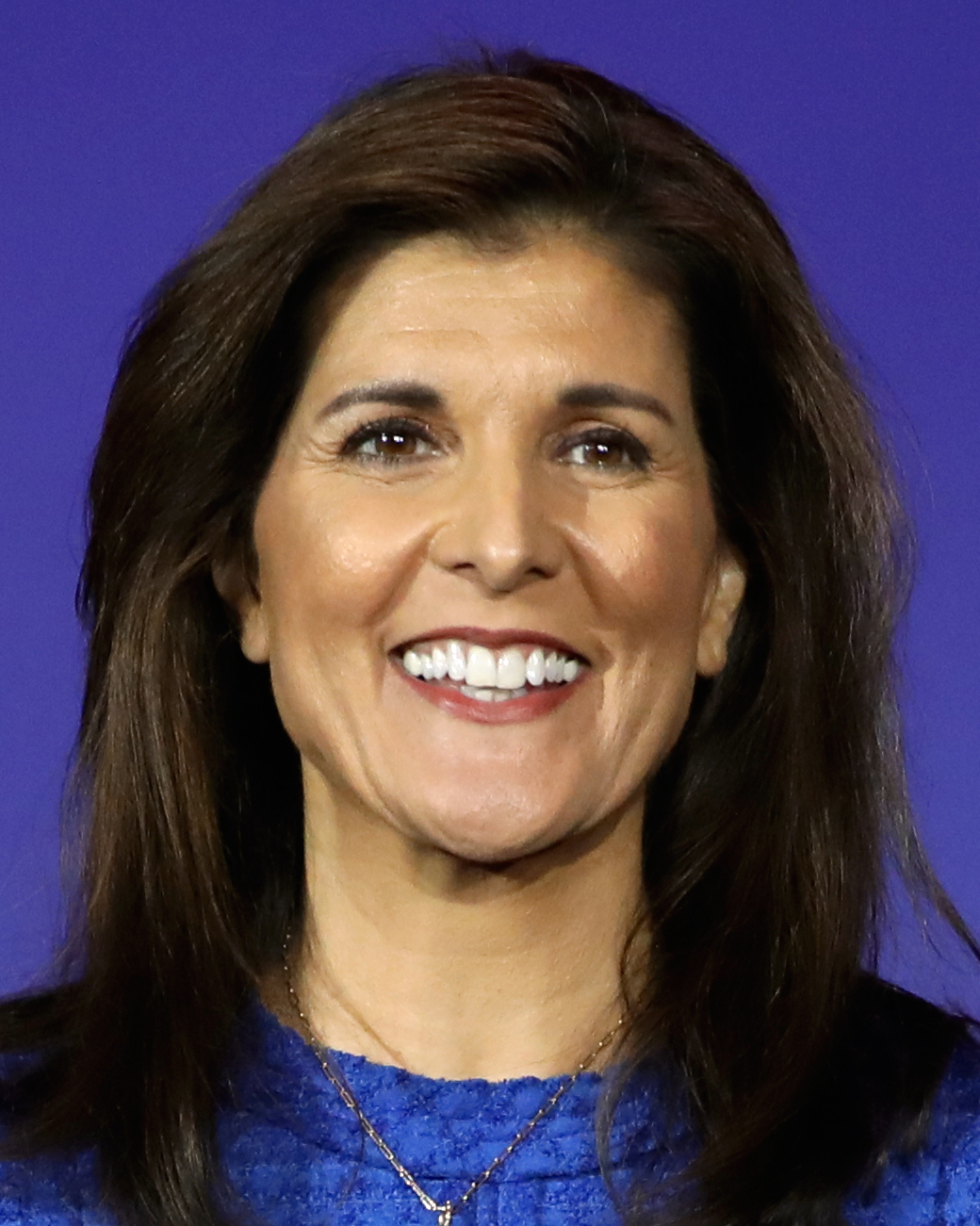
Candidate	Donald Trump	Nikki Haley (withdrawn)
Home state	Florida	South Carolina
Delegate count	19	0
Popular vote	4,348	68
Percentage	97.08%	1.52%
County results
Trump
>90%
No votes

The 2024 Hawaii Republican presidential caucuses were held on March 12, 2024, from 6pm to 8pm, as part of the Republican Party primaries for the 2024 presidential election. 19 delegates to the 2024 Republican National Convention were allocated on a proportional basis. The contest was held alongside primaries in Georgia, Mississippi, and Washington.

== Endorsements ==
Donald Trump

State legislators

- Bob McDermott, former state representative from the 40th district (2012–2022) and 32nd district (1996–2002)

== Results ==
Hawaii Republican caucuses, March 12, 2024
Candidate	Votes	Percentage	Actual delegate count		
Candidate	Votes	Percentage	Bound	Unbound	Total
Donald Trump	4,348	97.08%	19	0	19
Nikki Haley (withdrawn)	68	1.52%	0	0	0
Vivek Ramaswamy (withdrawn)	26	0.58%	0	0	0
Ron DeSantis (withdrawn)	25	0.56%	0	0	0
Chris Christie (withdrawn)	8	0.18%	0	0	0
Ryan Binkley (withdrawn)	2	0.04%	0	0	0
Doug Burgum (withdrawn)	1	0.02%	0	0	0
David Stuckenberg	1	0.02%	0	0	0
Total:	4,479	100.00%	19	0	19

== See also ==
- 2024 Hawaii Democratic presidential caucuses
- 2024 Republican Party presidential primaries
- 2024 United States presidential election
- 2024 United States presidential election in Hawaii
- 2024 United States elections
