= 2024 Mississippi Republican presidential primary =

- March 12, 2024

40 Republican National Convention delegates

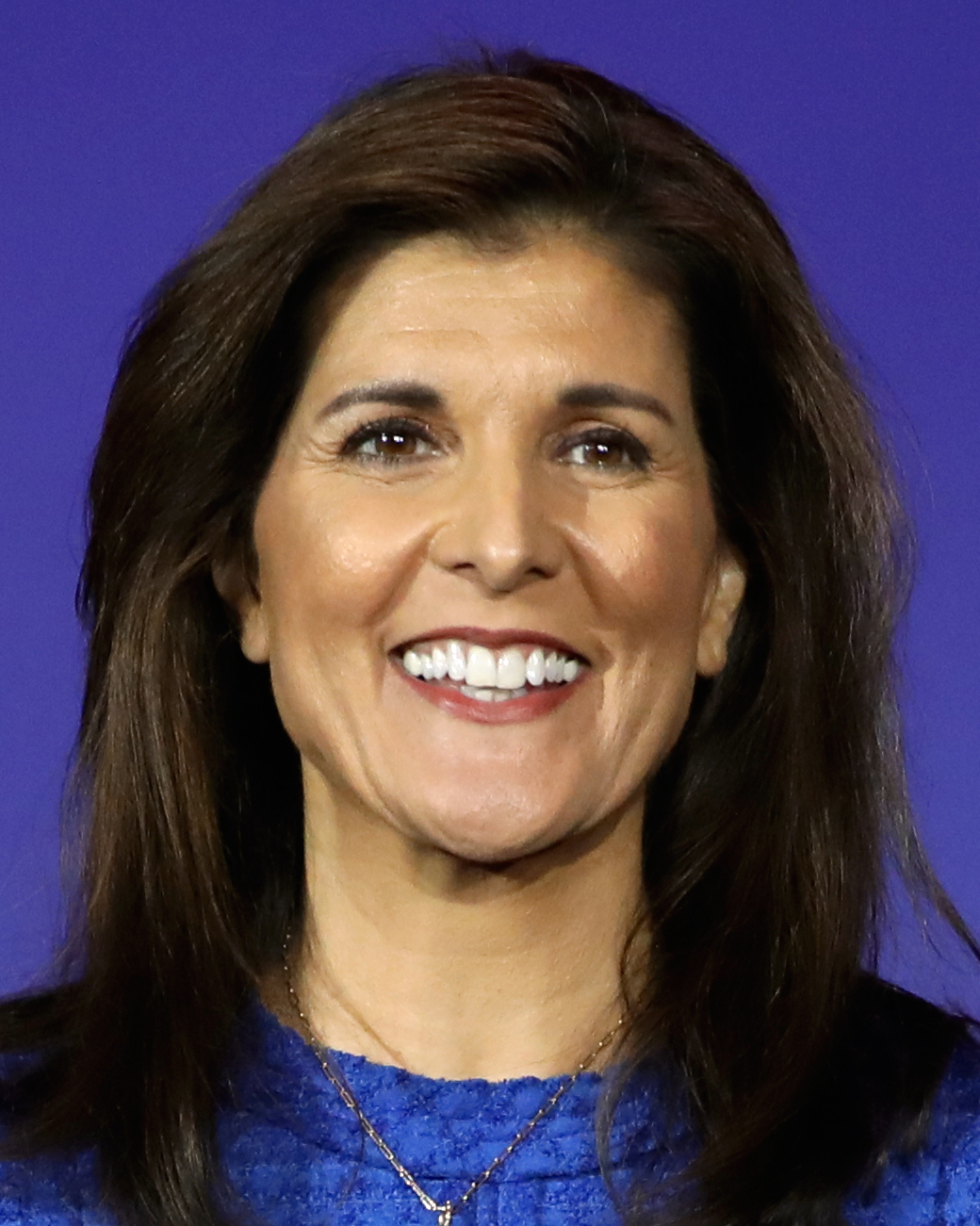
Candidate	Donald Trump	Nikki Haley (withdrawn)
Home state	Florida	South Carolina
Delegate count	40	0
Popular vote	229,198	13,437
Percentage	92.50%	5.42%

Trump
40 – 50%
50 – 60%
60 – 70%
70 – 80%
80 – 90%
90 – 100%
Haley
40 – 50%
50 – 60%
60 – 70%
70 – 80%
80 – 90%
90 – 100%
Other
50% tie
No votes

The 2024 Mississippi Republican presidential primary was held on March 12, 2024, as part of the Republican Party primaries for the 2024 presidential election. 40 delegates to the 2024 Republican National Convention will be allocated on a winner-take-most basis. The contest was held alongside primaries in Georgia, Hawaii, and Washington.

== Candidates ==
Four candidates made the primary ballot according to the secretary of state:

- Donald Trump
- Nikki Haley (withdrawn)
- Ron DeSantis (withdrawn)
- Vivek Ramaswamy (withdrawn)

== Endorsements ==
Ron DeSantis (withdrawn)

Former federal executive official

- Mike Hurst, U.S. Attorney for the Southern District of Mississippi (2017–2021); Republican nominee for Attorney General in 2015

State senator

- Chris Caughman, District 35 (2016–present)

State representative

- Fred Shanks, District 60 (2018–present)
Donald Trump

U.S. Senators

- Cindy Hyde-Smith, (2018–present)
- Roger Wicker, (2007–present)

U.S. Representatives

- Mike Ezell, MS-04 (2023–present)
- Michael Guest, MS-03 (2019–present)
- Trent Kelly, MS-01 (2015–present)

Governors

- Phil Bryant, (2012–2020)
- Tate Reeves, (2020–present)

State executive officials

- Chris Brown, Member-elect of the Mississippi Public Service Commission from the Northern District (2024–present)
- Mike Chaney, Insurance Commissioner of Mississippi (2008–present)
- Andy Gipson, Agriculture and Commerce Commissioner of Mississippi (2018–present)
- Delbert Hosemann, Lieutenant Governor (2020–present)
- Lynn Fitch, Attorney General of Mississippi (2020–present)
- Dane Maxwell, Member of the Mississippi Public Service Commission from the Southern District (2020–present)
- David McRae, Mississippi State Treasurer (2020-present)
- Shad White, Auditor of Mississippi (2018–present)

Notable individual

- Christopher Townsend, rapper

== Results ==
Mississippi Republican primary, March 12, 2024
Candidate	Votes	Percentage	Actual delegate count		
Candidate	Votes	Percentage	Bound	Unbound	Total
Donald Trump	229,198	92.50%	40	0	40
Nikki Haley (withdrawn)	13,437	5.42%	0	0	0
Ron DeSantis (withdrawn)	4,042	1.63%	0	0	0
Vivek Ramaswamy (withdrawn)	1,096	0.44%	0	0	0
Total:	247,773	100.00%	40	0	40

== Polling ==
Poll source	Date(s) administered	Sample size	Margin of error	Chris Christie	Ron DeSantis	Nikki Haley	Asa Hutchinson	Mike Pence	Vivek Ramaswamy	Tim Scott	Donald Trump	Other	Undecided
Mississippi Today/Siena College	Aug 20–28, 2023	650 (LV)	± 4.0%	6%	22%	3%	2%	2%	2%	2%	61%	2%	–
Mississippi Today/Siena College	Jan 8–12, 2023	487 (RV)	± 5.9%	–	39%	–	–	–	–	–	46%	3% (Note: "Someone else" with 3%)	11%
Echelon Insights	Aug 31 – Sep 7, 2022	211 (LV)	± 7.8%	–	31%	–	–	–	–	–	58%	11%	–

== See also ==
- 2024 Republican Party presidential primaries
- 2024 Mississippi Democratic presidential primary
- 2024 United States presidential election
- 2024 United States presidential election in Mississippi
- 2024 United States elections
