= 2024 Missouri Republican presidential caucuses =

- March 2, 2024

54 Republican National Convention delegates The number of pledged delegates won is determined by the number of state delegates won (Note: The number of pledged national convention delegates is calculated through the number of state delegates won, however, a candidate must get both at least 15% of the total vote to get statewide delegates and at least 15% of the vote in a congressional district to get district delegates from that district. Each precinct has a certain number of state delegates and allocates them based on how many caucus goers there are for each candidate at that precinct.)
Candidate	Donald Trump
Home state	Florida
Delegate count	54 (Note: Delegates aren't formally bound until the state convention on May 4)
State delegates	924 (100.00%) (Note: The Missouri Republican Party has only released the state delegate results instead of the popular vote.)
County results
Trump
>90%

The 2024 Missouri Republican presidential caucuses were held on March 2, 2024, as part of the Republican Party primaries for the 2024 presidential election. 54 delegates to the 2024 Republican National Convention were allocated on a winner-take-most basis. The contest was held alongside caucuses in Idaho and Michigan.

Former president Donald Trump defeated former U.N. ambassador Nikki Haley in a landslide, winning all 924 state delegates. However, no delegates to the national convention were allocated at the caucuses and delegates were not be bound until the April "district conventions" or the May state convention. In July 2024, it was reported that Missouri Republicans clashed over their presidential delegate selections, after 27 delegates elected in May were removed from the list. On July 6, the executive committee of the Missouri Republican Party appointed 27 at-large delegates and 26 alternates to replace these delegates.

== Candidates ==
The following candidates were eligible for nomination at the Missouri caucuses:

- Nikki Haley
- David Stuckenberg
- Donald Trump

== Background ==
In June 2022, Governor Mike Parson signed HB 1878, which repealed the state's presidential primary. Numerous attempts were made by the Missouri General Assembly to reinstate it, but it was not done in time. In October 2023, the Missouri Republican Party announced it would hold caucuses in 2024.

== Endorsements ==
Donald Trump

U.S. Senators

- Josh Hawley, Missouri
- Eric Schmitt, Missouri

U.S. Representatives

- Ann Wagner, MO-02
- Mark Alford, MO-04
- Sam Graves, MO-06
- Eric Burlison, MO-07
- Billy Long, MO-07 (2011–2023)
- Jason Smith, MO-08

Governors

- Mike Parson, Missouri
- Eric Greitens, Missouri

State executive officials

- Andrew Bailey, Attorney General
- Mike Kehoe, Lieutenant Governor of Missouri

State senators

- Rick Brattin, Member of the Missouri Senate from the 31st district
- Bill Eigel, Member of the Missouri Senate from the 23rd district

Former party official

- Ed Martin, chair of the Missouri Republican Party (2013–2015)

== Polling ==
Poll source	Date(s) administered	Sample size (Note: Key: A – all adults RV – registered voters LV – likely voters V – unclear)	Margin of error	Ron DeSantis	Nikki Haley	Mike Pence	Donald Trump	Other	Undecided
Remington Research (R) (Note: Poll commissioned by the Missouri Scout, a nonpartisan tip sheet)	Feb 8–9, 2023	820 (LV)	± 3.2%	35%	8%	–	38%	–	–
Remington Research (R)	Feb 8–9, 2023	820 (LV)	± 3.2%	45%	–	–	38%	–	–
Remington Research (R)	Nov 15–16, 2022	940 (LV)	± 3.0%	47%	–	–	38%	–	15%
Remington Research (R)	Nov 15–16, 2022	940 (LV)	± 3.0%	38%	–	–	36%	7% (Note: Josh Hawley with 7%)	19%
Remington Research (R)	Jul 27–28, 2022	818 (LV)	± 3.4%	18%	–	–	42%	23% (Note: Josh Hawley with 6%; "Someone else" with 17%)	17%
	January 20, 2021	Inauguration of Joe Biden							
Remington Research (R)	Dec 2–3, 2020	840 (RV)	± 3.4%	–	–	32%	–	42% (Note: Josh Hawley with 29%; Ivanka Trump with 13%)	26%

== Results ==
The Associated Press called the race for Donald Trump shortly after the polls closed.

Missouri Republican caucus, March 2, 2024
Candidate	State delegates	Percentage	Actual delegate count		
Candidate	State delegates	Percentage	Bound	Unbound	Total
Donald Trump	924	100.00	54	0	54
Nikki Haley	0	0.00	0	0	0
David Stuckenberg	0	0.00	0	0	0
Total:	924	100	54	0	54

== See also ==
- 2024 Missouri Democratic presidential primary
- 2024 Republican Party presidential primaries
- 2024 United States presidential election
- 2024 United States presidential election in Missouri
- 2024 United States elections

== Notes ==
Partisan clients
