= Chris Christie 2024 presidential campaign =

American political campaign

Chris Christie for President
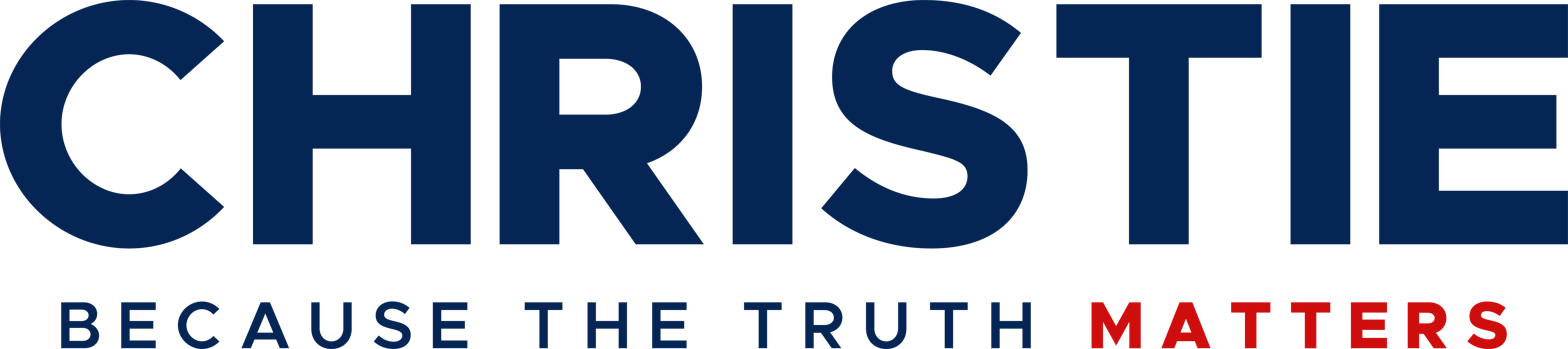
- Campaign: 2024 Republican primaries 2024 U.S. presidential election
- Candidate: Chris Christie; 55th Governor of New Jersey (2010–2018)
- Affiliation: Republican Party
- Status: Announced: June 6, 2023; Suspended: January 10, 2024
- Headquarters: Jersey City, New Jersey
- Receipts: $7,628,084.62
- Slogan: Because the truth matters

Website
- chrischristie.com (archived – January 3, 2024)

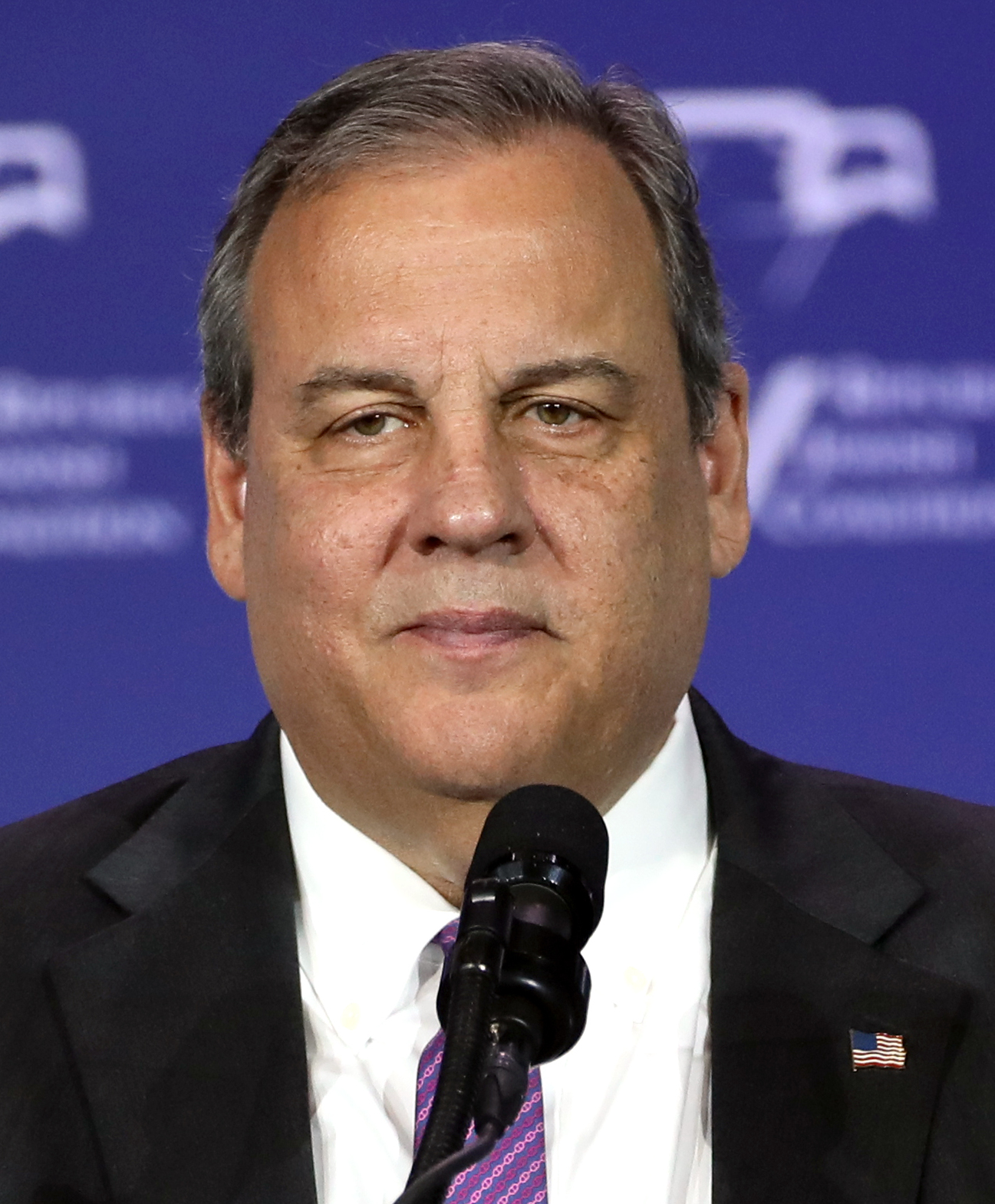
Chris Christie 55th Governor of New Jersey

The 2024 presidential campaign of Chris Christie, the former governor of New Jersey, was formally launched on June 6, 2023, at an event in Manchester, New Hampshire. He was seeking the Republican Party nomination in its 2024 presidential primaries. He withdrew from the race on January 10, 2024.

== Background ==
Christie served as U.S. Attorney for the District of New Jersey from January 2002 to December 2008 during the presidency of George W. Bush. In 2009, Christie was elected governor of New Jersey, defeating incumbent Democratic governor Jon Corzine. He was reelected by a wide margin in 2013, defeating State Senate Majority Leader Barbara Buono. On June 30, 2015, he announced his campaign for the Republican nomination for president in the 2016 Republican primaries. He dropped out of the race on February 10, 2016, after a poor showing in the New Hampshire primary, and endorsed eventual winner Donald Trump. He left office as governor of New Jersey in 2018 and was succeeded by Democrat Phil Murphy.

Christie was an ally of Trump during most of his presidency, but he refused to support claims of voter fraud after the 2020 presidential election because Trump could not provide him with any evidence. During the January 6 Capitol attack, Christie phoned Trump to attempt to persuade him to end the violence, but Trump did not pick up. Thereafter, Christie distanced himself from Trump and voiced support for Trump's second impeachment.

=== Pre-campaign speculation ===
In a December 2020 interview with radio talk show host Hugh Hewitt, Christie said he wouldn't "rule out" a presidential run in the 2024 presidential election. In October 2022, Christie appeared on Real Time with Bill Maher, where he responded "sure" when asked if he was open to a potential 2024 presidential bid. In April 2023, Christie criticized Florida governor Ron DeSantis's feud with The Walt Disney Company, claiming it showed a lack of conservative values. On May 31, 2023, Axios reported that Christie was expected to announce his candidacy the following week on June 6 after his allies formed a super PAC ahead of the bid.

=== Announcement ===
On June 6, 2023, Christie filed with the Federal Election Commission (FEC) to enter the race, and announced his presidential bid later that day in Manchester, New Hampshire. During his announcement, which was also in the format of a forum, Christie heavily criticized Trump for both his actions as president and his numerous indictments. Christie's campaign was supported by the Tell It Like It Is Super PAC. On June 12, 2023, Christie held a town hall meeting hosted by Anderson Cooper at CNN. When asked how he differed from other Republican candidates, Christie responded, "I governed in a blue state, and made things happen". Despite other Republican presidential candidates vowing to remove Christopher Wray as director of the FBI, when asked, Christie said he would have kept him if elected president.

== Campaign ==
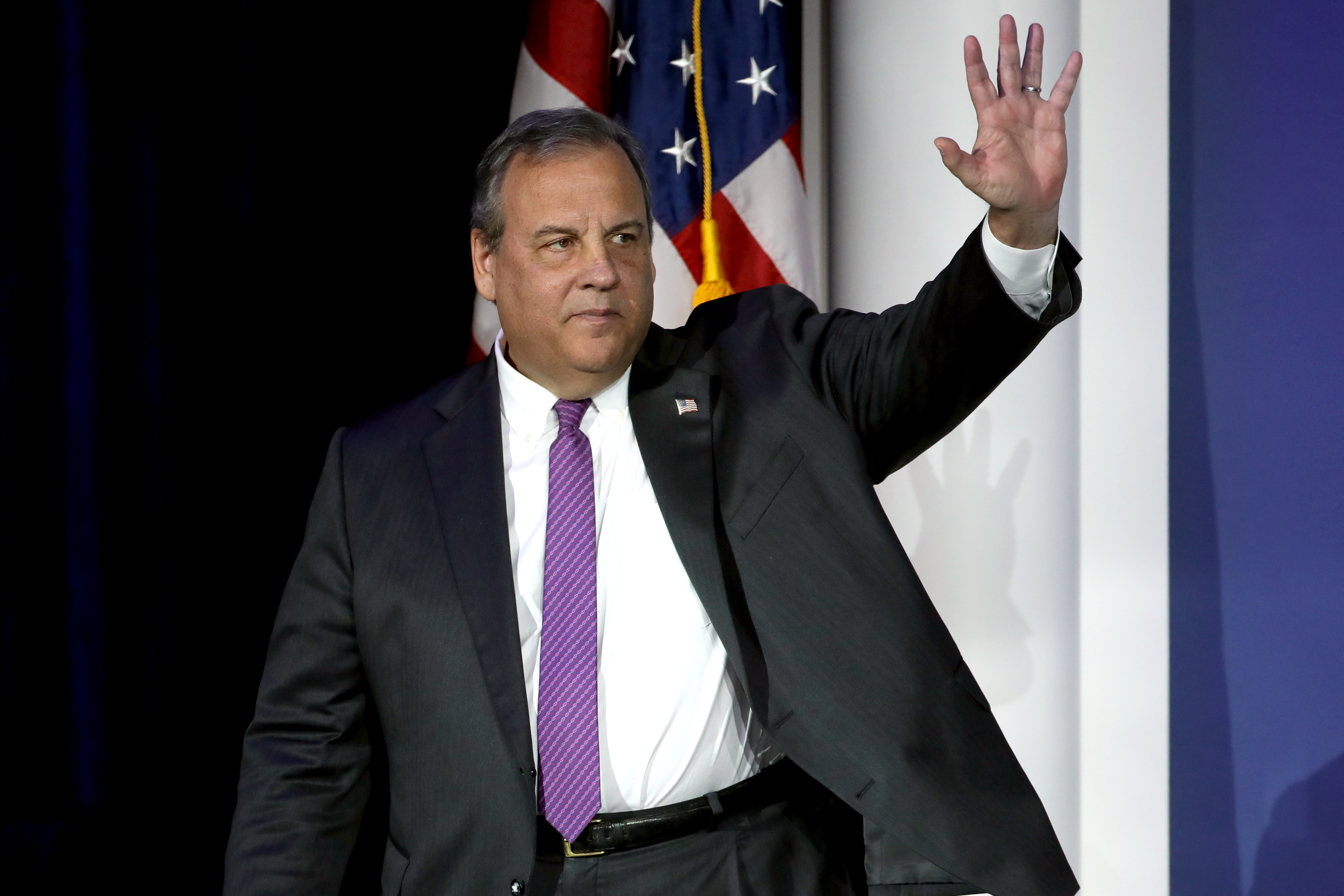
Christie at the Republican Jewish Coalition in October 2023

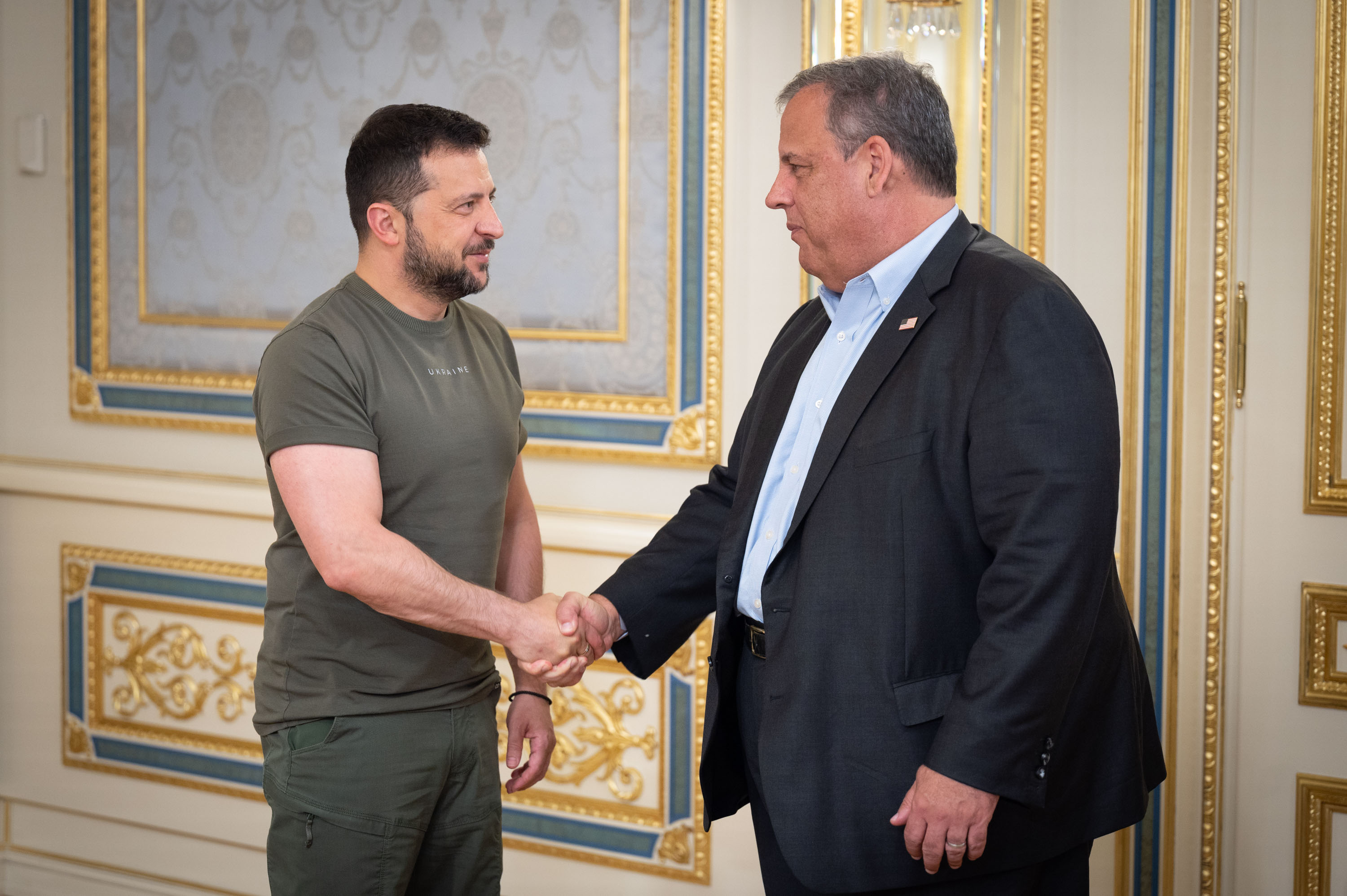
Christie with Ukrainian President Volodymyr Zelenskyy, on August 4, 2023.

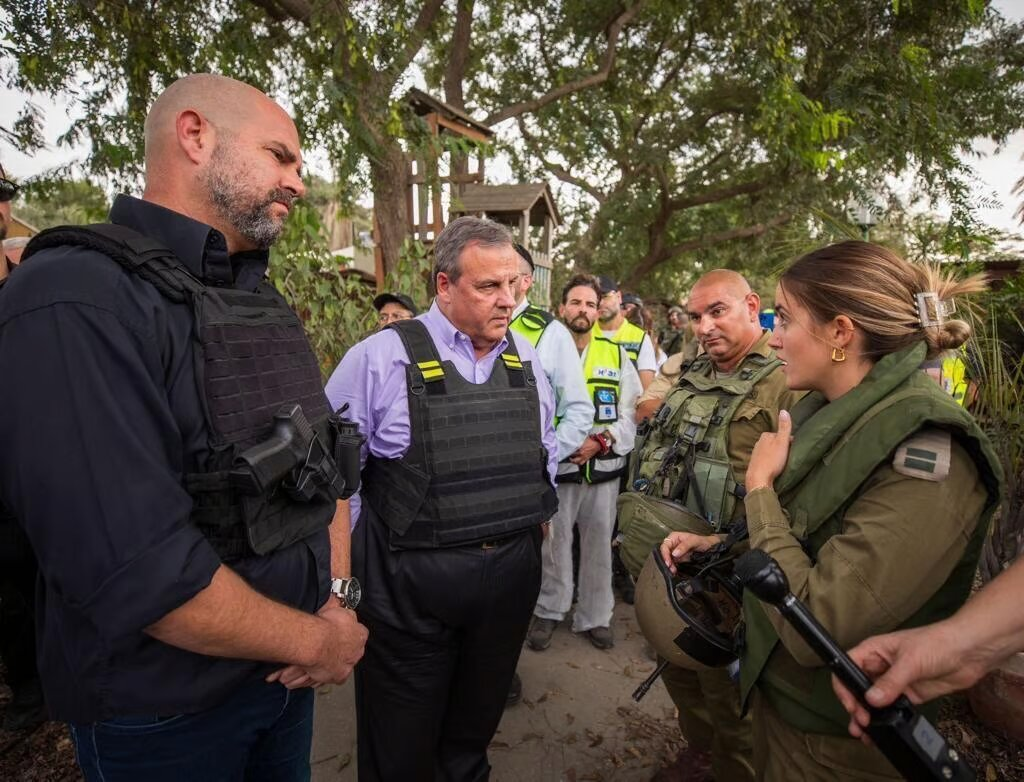
Christie became the only presidential candidate to visit Israel during their Gaza war, on November 12, 2023.

On July 12, Christie announced that his campaign had met the donor requirement to participate in the August primary debate. In order to participate in that debate, Christie was required to sign a loyalty pledge from the Republican National Committee stating he would support the eventual nominee. Christie has criticized the pledge, calling it a "useless idea," but nevertheless signed the pledge in order to debate.

On August 4, 2023, Christie made an unannounced trip to Ukraine, visiting the city of Bucha, the site of a massacre of civilians by Russian forces. Later in the day, Christie met with Ukrainian President Volodymyr Zelenskyy, praising Ukraine's fight against Russia and reiterating his support for arming Ukraine. According to Christie, he and Zelenskyy did not discuss the U.S. presidential race. Christie was the second Republican presidential candidate, following Mike Pence, to visit Ukraine.

On October 3, Christie and opponent Vivek Ramaswamy were due to debate in a segment on Special Report with Bret Baier on Fox News. However, the Republican National Committee (RNC) contacted Baier and threatened to ban Christie and Ramaswamy from attending future primary debates if they were to debate on Baier's show. Christie has regarded the RNC's statements as a "cause for concern".

Christie officially filed in the New Hampshire Republican primary in Concord on October 19, 2023.

On November 13, 2023, National Review called on Christie, alongside Doug Burgum, to drop out of the race citing the end of the Mike Pence and Tim Scott campaigns. The National Review argued that Christie is not running to actually win the election, but rather to build name-recognition and that his opposition to Trump is halfhearted due to his endorsement of Trump in 2016. In a response, Christie said he did not care where he was in national polling by explaining that there is no national primary and touting his good showing in New Hampshire polling.

Following his announcement that he would campaign until at least the Michigan primary of February 27, New York outlined Christie as a "bitter end" candidate, comparing him to Ron Paul's 2012 campaign, stating that there was no chance the Republican establishment would ever flip to his side but he would continue his race out of a perceived moral obligation. New York went on to state that:

"Chris Christie’s path to the 2024 Republican presidential nomination will never be more viable than it was the day he announced his candidacy. So while there’s not much point in him continuing his candidacy today or tomorrow or the day after tomorrow, he really does have nothing to lose by sticking around."

On December 2, 2023, the deadline to submit the 2,000 signatures required to appear as a candidate on the ballot in Maine passed and Christie, alongside Asa Hutchinson, failed to submit the required signatures. The Secretary of State of Maine reported that Christie's campaign only submitted 844 signatures, however, Christie disputed this, stating he submitted over 6,000.

Christie withdrew from the race on January 10, 2024, stating that "[i]t’s clear to me tonight that there isn’t a path for me to win the nomination".

=== Attacks on Trump ===
Unlike many other candidates in the 2024 Republican primaries, Christie focused most of his campaign on attacking Trump. He pledged to not support Trump if he became the nominee.

Guys from New Jersey are used to dealing with obnoxious blowhards from New York.

— Chris Christie, referring to Donald Trump

In his June 6 announcement, Christie described Trump as a "lonely, self-consumed, self-serving mirror hog." He has blamed Trump for the Republican under-performance in the 2022 midterm elections because candidates who were endorsed by Trump evidently lost their elections. In an interview on CNN, Christie described the federal prosecution of Trump as "very, very evidence-filled", and described Trump's handling of government documents as "bad" and "irresponsible". At the same time, Christie criticized other Republican candidates for defending Trump. Christie has also said that if he was elected president, he "can't imagine" pardoning Trump, something most other candidates have pledged to do.

When referring to the loyalty pledge to participate in the August debate, Christie said he would take it "...as seriously as Donald Trump did…" during the 2016 Republican primaries. Censured former GOP Representative Adam Kinzinger, who himself had denounced Trump following January 6, predicted Trump had skipped the first debate because he was "scared to death" of Christie. Kinzinger's PAC, Country First, also sent out emails encouraging donors to give to Christie's campaign in an effort to get him on the debate stage in August. The PAC also directly donated to Christie's campaign.

=== Suspension ===
Shortly before he dropped out of the race on January 10, 2024, Christie was caught on a hot mic, criticizing both Nikki Haley and Ron DeSantis, who were set to debate later that evening. Christie was heard predicting Haley was "gonna get smoked" in the race against Donald Trump in New Hampshire, despite polls showing single digit margins between Trump and Haley. Shortly after the comments emerged, DeSantis posted on X, "I agree with Christie that Nikki Haley is 'going to get smoked.'" Trump would ultimately win the New Hampshire primary, beating Haley.

In late March, Christie announced he had declined to run for president under a No Labels ticket. He said he was encouraged to run, but ultimately refused, believing there was not a viable path for a third party to win the election.

"I appreciate the encouragement I've gotten to pursue a third party candidacy. I believe we need a country that once again feels like everyone has a stake in what we're doing and leadership that strives to bring people together, instead of using anger to divide us. While I believe this is a conversation that needs to be had with the American people, I also believe that if there is not a pathway to win and if my candidacy in any way, shape or form would help Donald Trump become president again, then it is not the way forward."

— Chris Christie, via Twitter

According to The Hill, Christie said he was willing to lead the ticket on the condition of having a Democratic running mate, but the organization was unable to find a suitable candidate. As Christie was one of the final candidates the organization was considering to lead their ticket, No Labels officially abandoned its attempt to run a "unity ticket" on April 4, 2024.

Christie got 139,541 votes or 0.6% during the whole 2024 Republican Party presidential primaries.

== Positions ==
A New Jersey Republican, Christie is considered to be a moderate conservative.

In his early political career, Christie opposed same sex marriage and vetoed several bills that would have legalized it in New Jersey while he was governor. His stance on same sex marriage has evolved over time; in 2013 he voiced support for New Jersey's civil union law, which extended to gay couples the same legal benefits of marriage with regard to state law; and in 2022 he said he "respects same-sex marriage and considers it legally settled."

As governor, he refused to legalize marijuana in New Jersey, although his successor, Phil Murphy, legalized marijuana for New Jersey adults in 2021. Christie has said he supports certain gun control measures and accepts the scientific consensus on climate change.

During the fourth Republican presidential debate, Christie said that, as president, he would send American troops to help free hostages taken by Hamas. He rejected calls for a ceasefire in the Gaza war.

Christie supported increasing military aid to Ukraine, labeling current aid as insufficient to defeat the Russian invasion, and stated that arming Ukraine would deter China from potentially invading Taiwan.

== Polling ==
Christie consistently polled between one percent and six percent throughout his campaign. He dismissed the polls and stated that higher numbers do not necessarily indicate a primary victory.

In the months leading up to his announcement, various media outlets viewed Christie as a likely contender in the Republican primaries, but pre-election polling showed him polling far behind Trump, who had announced his fourth presidential campaign in November 2022.

In an August 7 poll by NH Journal, Christie tied for second place with Ron DeSantis in the primary state of New Hampshire with both at nine percent. An August 17 poll by FiveThirtyEight placed Christie at second place in New Hampshire with 14 percent, only behind Donald Trump, who polled at 34 percent. Christie focused on New Hampshire and hoped to defeat Trump there. When interviewed by Chris Cuomo on September 14, Christie pledged that, if he did not end up "top 4" in the New Hampshire primary, he would drop out of the race.

Christie saw a surge of support among Democratic voters after announcing his candidacy. In a New York Times/Siena College poll in September 2023, 24 percent of Democratic or Democratic leaning voters said they would likely vote for Christie if he became the Republican nominee.

== Public perception ==
Christie was named among Time magazine's 100 most influential people in the world in 2011 and 2013.

Approval ratings during Christie's tenure as governor ranged from a record high to a record low. Following Hurricane Sandy and his response to it, various polls indicated his approval rating was near 80 percent. It remained above 60 percent until January 2014 and above 50 percent until August 2014. Christie finished his second term as governor with an approval rating between 19 percent and 22 percent—the lowest for any governor at that time. In a poll conducted by Monmouth University in late April and early May 2021—three years after Christie left office—64 percent of New Jersey residents viewed Christie unfavorably, while 26 percent viewed him favorably, showing only a slight improvement since he left office. Of those questioned, 19 percent said that he would make a good president, while 59 percent said that he would not.
