= Vivek Ramaswamy 2024 presidential campaign =

American political campaign

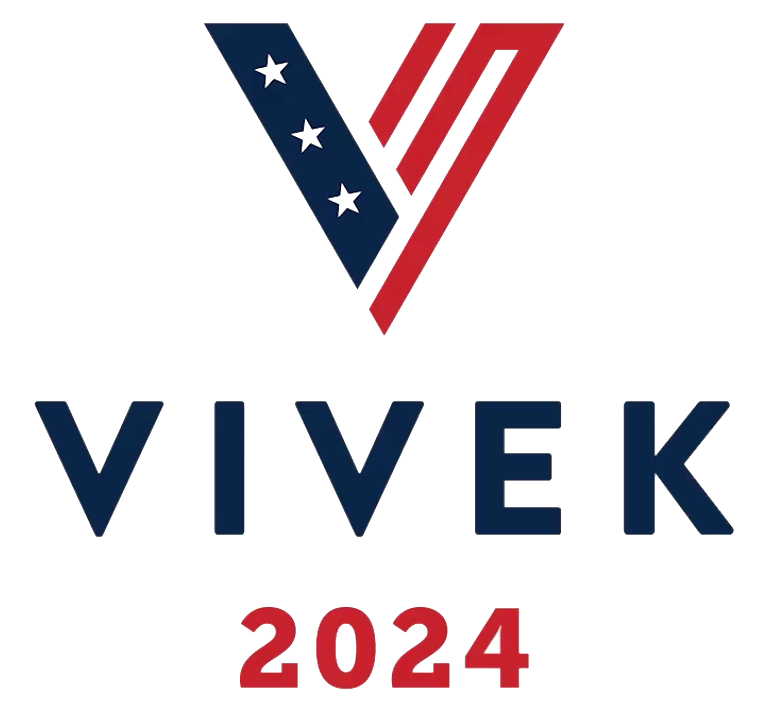
- Campaign: 2024 Republican primaries; 2024 U.S. presidential election
- Candidate: Vivek Ramaswamy
- Affiliation: Republican Party
- Status: Announced: February 21, 2023; Suspended: January 15, 2024
- Headquarters: Des Moines, Iowa; New Hampshire; Columbus, Ohio (formerly); Birmingham, Alabama (formerly)
- Slogan: A New American Dream

Website
- vivek2024.com (archived January 2, 2024)

Vivek Ramaswamy began his 2024 presidential campaign on February 21, 2023, as a candidate in the 2024 Republican primary. He formally launched his candidacy at an interview on the Tucker Carlson Tonight show. In his campaign announcement, Ramaswamy pitched himself as a conservative with a vision for American national identity. On January 15, 2024, Ramaswamy suspended his campaign, subsequent to the Iowa caucuses.

According to Politico, Ramaswamy was inspired by Donald Trump's victory in the 2016 presidential election, and wanted to run "with an entrepreneurial spirit, unorthodox ideas, and few expectations." Ramaswamy considered a candidacy in the 2022 United States Senate election in Ohio, but decided not to run. Since that time, he had been mooted as a potential future presidential candidate. If elected, he would have been the first Indian American president and youngest person to ever assume the presidency.

His central campaign promise was an extensive and severe downsizing of federal agencies. His other key campaign issue was environmental, social, and corporate governance (ESG) initiatives, which Ramaswamy alleged are detrimental agendas that mix business with politics. Ramaswamy marketed himself as an "American nationalist" and "anti-woke" candidate. He wrote that the corruption of American society by what he calls "victimhood narratives" makes it impossible to achieve merit-based hierarchies.

Ramaswamy campaigned extensively for the 2024 Iowa Republican presidential caucuses, the first contest of the candidate selection process. His campaign targeted young people, voters who were disaffected, and Donald Trump supporters who could be persuaded that Ramaswamy would "take the America First movement to the next level." At an October Iowa campaign event Ramaswamy said "The only chance we have is Iowa. ... If I win Iowa, I'm your next president." By January 2, the campaign announced that Ramaswamy had attended two or more campaign events in each of Iowa's 99 counties, 252 public events with another 25 scheduled by caucus day. Ramaswamy placed fourth in the caucuses on January 15, garnering 7.7% of the votes.

== Political positions ==
=== Abortion policy ===
Ramaswamy opposed abortion, saying "I think abortion is murder." He opposed a federal ban on abortion but supports state-level six week abortion bans. He supported "exceptions for rape, incest and the life of the mother."

=== Affirmative action ===
Ramaswamy opposed affirmative action, calling it the "single biggest form of institutionalized racism in America today." He has spoken in support of rescinding Lyndon B. Johnson's Executive Order 11246.

=== Anti-woke ===
A profile in The New York Times described Ramaswamy as an anti-woke candidate. Ramaswamy's August 2021 book, the New York Times bestseller, Woke Inc described his view of the so-called "modern woke-industrial complex." He argued that critical race theory indoctrinates public school children. He also called "COVID-ism", "climate-ism", and "gender ideology", "new secular religions."

=== Antisemitism ===
Ramaswamy was among the first speakers at the 2023 Republican Jewish Coalition Conference in Las Vegas, where he noted his strong views against antisemitism and his long-standing relationship with some Jewish organizations, since his college days. Ramaswamy openly come in support of Israel and the Jewish people, even though he favored a reduction in US aid to Israel by 2028. After the October 7 attacks on Israel by Hamas, Ramaswamy showed support for Israel saying that Israel has "a right to defend itself" and defeat Hamas.

Responding to the 2023 United States Congress hearing on antisemitism, in which several University presidents evaded answering whether "calling for the genocide of Jewish People" was against their University rules, Ramaswamy criticized the university leaders for their poor response to antisemitism on campuses. Further, Ramaswamy called on universities to rewrite their speech codes to include antisemitism and said university presidents should be fired not just for their testimony, but for failing to "embrace the true purpose of seeking knowledge as opposed to indoctrination."

=== Drug policy ===
Ramaswamy described himself as "not a war on drugs person." He was in favor of federally legalizing marijuana, calling it "a joke" that the drug is federally criminalized. He was also in favor of decriminalizing ayahuasca and ketamine usage for military veterans suffering from PTSD, arguing that it would help combat the U.S. fentanyl epidemic and prevent veteran suicides.

=== Economic policy ===
Ramaswamy endorsed ending the Federal Reserve's dual mandate to control inflation and minimize unemployment, saying the institution's mission should be limited to control inflation.

==== Federal funding ====
Ramaswamy vowed to shut down the Department of Education, the Federal Bureau of Investigation, the Centers for Disease Control and Prevention, the Bureau of Alcohol, Tobacco, Firearms and Explosives, the Internal Revenue Service and the Nuclear Regulatory Commission. He said he would have laid off over seventy five percent of federal employees by the end of his first term. In a campaign white paper the candidate asserts the president has the authority to effect these changes unilaterally. Legal scholars say this is not true.

Ramaswamy argued for eight-year term limits for all unelected federal bureaucrats, similar to term limits imposed on US presidents.

==== Tax ====
Ramaswamy did not take a public position on the Trump 2018 Tax Cuts and Jobs Act.

In his book Nation of Victims, Ramaswamy expressed support for an inheritance tax rate as high as 59%, writing that inter-generational wealth transfers create a "hereditary aristocracy."

=== Energy policy ===
Ramaswamy advocated for nuclear energy expansion, calling it "the best form of carbon-free energy production known to mankind."

=== Foreign policy ===
Ramaswamy argued that foreign policy is "all about prioritization" and that good use of the US military is "protecting American soil and American interests, not a pointless war somewhere else."

==== NATO ====
Ramaswamy indicated that he would have withdrawn the US from NATO if he had become president.

==== Mexico ====
Ramaswamy argued that the United States should use the military to directly take on Mexican drug cartels and "end the fentanyl epidemic in this country." He stated, "we can do it to Bin Laden, we can do it to Soleimani, we can do it to the Mexican drug cartels south of the border."

==== Israel ====
Ramaswamy is pro-Israel and calls Israel "a Divine nation, charged with a Divine purpose". Ramaswamy has said Israel should feel free to oppose the two-state solution.

He favors a reduction in US aid over the years, arguing that he would negotiate more Israeli-Arab bilateral agreements, rendering U.S. aid unnecessary by 2028. After the October 7 attacks on Israel by Hamas, Ramaswamy came out in support of Israel, noting that Israel has "a right to defend itself" and to make the decisions of how it defends itself, while the US should provide a "diplomatic Iron Dome" for Israel to be able to carry that out." However, he also noted that US aid to Israel should be contingent upon Israel's plans for defeating Hamas, expressing concerns over Israeli plans for a ground invasion of the Gaza Strip.

==== Taiwan ====
Ramaswamy said "we will defend Taiwan until we achieve semi conductor independence...I expect that to happen by the end of my first term, by 2028." He called for putting guns in "every Taiwanese household" in order to deter China from invading.

==== China ====
Ramaswamy said America needs a total "decoupling" from China. He describes the Chinese government as a "great existential threat" and argued China now represents a more significant threat to the sovereignty of United States than the Soviet Union was during the Cold War since this "economic codependent relationship" is developing a hostile government. He says the United States is "addicted" to this economic reliance on Chinese cheap goods and that economic separation from China would be, not easy but 'some sacrifice of short-term conveniences', necessary for long-term economic independence. He warned against a Russian-Chinese alliance.

==== Ukraine ====
Ramaswamy proposed to end the Russian invasion of Ukraine by conceding Russia's current occupied territories. To renew economic relations with these countries, Russia would be required to return to START and end its alliance with China, which he labeled as the greater threat. Ramaswamy said he would cut have support for Ukraine, and would have blocked attempts at Ukraine NATO membership. He called Ukrainian president Volodymyr Zelenskyy a "bully" and Russian President Vladimir Putin a "craven dictator."

==== Australia ====
Ramaswamy spoke extensively on foreign relations with Australia, a major ally of the United States. Ramaswamy encouraged Australia to play a stronger role in competing with China and defending Taiwan, as well as pledging to overcome obstacles to deliver US nuclear submarines to Australia as part of the AUKUS agreement (which was announced in 2021 by then-Australian Prime Minister Scott Morrison, then-British Prime Minister Boris Johnson and US President Joe Biden).

==== India ====
Ramaswamy called for stronger relations between the United States and India, noting the positive role that India can play in the Indo-Pacific. He also stated he had been impressed with the rapid economic growth of India under Prime Minister Narendra Modi.

=== Free speech ===
==== Government whistleblowers ====
Ramaswamy said he would have free WikiLeaks founder Julian Assange and former NSA employee Edward Snowden of all charges if elected. He said, "Once we have learned the level of corruption that our government actually has engaged in, and repeatedly lying to the public, in a certain form, it's a form of selective prosecution to not actually prosecute the government actors who broke the law, but simply to prosecute the one government actor who did expose it by technically violating a law of a different kind," referring to Snowden's actions as "a certain heroism."

==== Government censorship ====
Ramaswamy opposed government pressures on social media companies to censor disfavored political speech. He said "As Elon Musk did at Twitter, I will release the "state action files" from the federal government—publicly exposing every known instance in which bureaucrats have wrongfully pressured companies to take constitutionally prohibited actions." He wrote, "if you can't fire someone for being black, gay or Muslim, you shouldn't be able to fire someone for his political speech."

=== Immigration policy ===
Ramaswamy stated America must "unapologetically" secure the southern border against illegal immigration. He said he would have significantly lowered the number of permitted refugees allowed to immigrate to the U.S., while adding exceptions under "special circumstances", such as for Afghans who assisted the U.S. during its war in Afghanistan.

=== LGBT issues ===
Ramswamy said "I don't have a negative view of same-sex couples but I do have a negative view of a tyranny of the minority...we live in a country where free adults should be free to dress how they want, behave how they want and that's fine, but you don't oppress... and that especially includes kids because kids aren't the same as adults." In an interview, he described the LGBTQIA+ movement as "cult like" and having "no obligation to logic."

Ramaswamy said he would not have reinstated a transgender military ban.

=== Voting policy ===
Ramaswamy supported raising the voting age to 25, and only allowing those under 25 to vote if they either pass a civics test or work as first responders or military personnel. He supported requiring voter ID to cast a ballot and supported making election day a federal holiday.

== Events ==
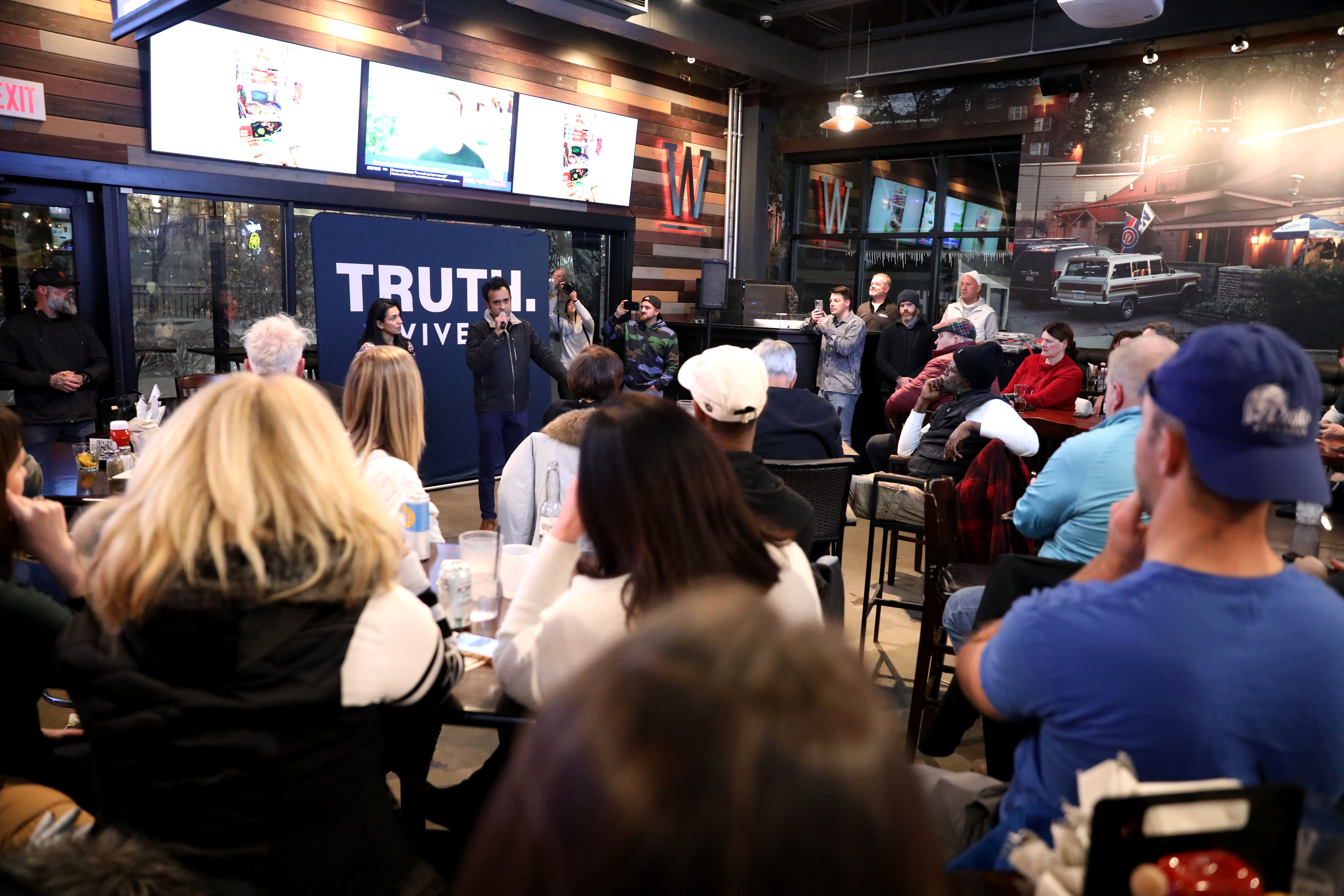
Ramaswamy speaks with supporters at a town hall in Des Moines, Iowa.

=== Donations ===
The day after the first debate, Ramaswamy's campaign confirmed it raised an additional $450,000 from donors since the previous night, with an average donation of $38.

In the first three months of Ramaswamy's campaign, he raised $1.16 million from donors, along with $10.55 million that he donated to his own campaign. In the second quarter, he raised $2.7 million from unique donors, and donated an additional $5 million of personal wealth to his campaign.

On July 21, 2023, Ramaswamy's campaign confirmed to The Hill that it had reached 65,000 unique donors. According to Ramaswamy, 40% of his 65,000 donors came from individuals who either made their first donation to a Republican, or their first political donation ever.

=== Interviews ===
Ramaswamy accepted almost any interview request, regardless of the outlet. Ramaswamy was interviewed by commentators across the political spectrum including Tucker Carlson, Bret Baier, Don Lemon, Krystal Ball, Margaret Hoover, Megyn Kelly, Chuck Todd, Kaitlan Collins, Mike Rowe, Bill Maher, John Stossel, Michael Knowles, Alex Jones, Candace Owens, Elon Musk, Jordan Peterson, and Russell Brand.

Politico reported, in August 2023, that Ramaswamy appeared on over 150 podcasts since February, and once appeared in 30 separate interviews within a single day. Time Magazine described it as a "everywhere-all-at-once strategy", which produced "a stream of online content more voluminous than any of his competitors." Politico also described it as "the most always-on, always-available strategy of the 2024 presidential race."

=== LinkedIn lockout ===
On May 17, 2023, Ramaswamy's LinkedIn account was locked for violations of LinkedIn's user agreement. The company cited three posts where he was critical of Joe Biden, the Chinese Communist Party, and climate change. On May 24, the company issued a statement that they do not tolerate "misinformation, hate speech, violence or any form of abuse" on their platform. Ramaswamy stated that his lockout was censorship, and a showcase of "Typical Big Tech behavior: trying to cover their tracks after egregious election interference." On May 25, the company restored his account, stating that the lockout was "in error."

=== Polls ===
On August 24, 2023, the FiveThirtyEight average of multiple recent polls placed Ramaswamy third at 10.3% behind Donald Trump (51.6%) and Ron DeSantis (14.8%) among Republican voters. However, several polls showed Ramaswamy in second place, ahead of DeSantis. An August poll from Cygnal had Ramaswamy in second place, with 11% support.

On January 14, 2024, Ramaswamy polled fourth at 4.3%, behind Trump (60.4%), DeSantis (12.1), and Hayley (11.7%) in the FiveThirtyEight average.

Ramaswamy was frequently chosen as the second choice candidate among supporters of Trump in the primary, though slightly behind DeSantis. Several polls found Ramaswamy attracted close to 20% support from Republicans under the age of 40, while only 2-3% among those aged 65 or over.

=== Debates ===
On July 21, 2023, Ramaswamy confirmed that he reached the minimum number of donors needed to appear at the first debate. He became the first Republican candidate to meet every requirement, after signing the loyalty pledge in early August.

==== First debate: August 23, 2023 ====
At the first Republican presidential debate, Ramaswamy appeared alongside Ron DeSantis, Mike Pence, Nikki Haley, Chris Christie, Tim Scott, Asa Hutchinson, and Doug Burgum.

The Daily Telegraph wrote that Ramaswamy "dominated" the debate, while The New York Times opined that Ramaswamy "broke through." The Associated Press likewise wrote that Vivek "overshadowed" DeSantis. The reporters of Politico had mixed responses, variously citing Ramaswamy, Pence, and DeSantis as the winners. The Hill declared Pence, Christie, and Haley the winners, while giving Ramaswamy a "mixed" performance, writing that "It seems near-certain that Ramaswamy is the candidate whose performance will most divide opinion." Rich Lowry of National Review opined that DeSantis, Ramaswamy, and Haley were the three top performing candidates. Liz Peek of Fox News felt that Ramaswamy was the worst performing candidate, while Haley was the best. Anthony Zurcher of BBC News declared Ramaswamy the top winner, followed by Pence, and then Haley. The Washington Post declared Trump (who did not appear), Ramaswamy, and Pence the debate's winners.

Ramaswamy's performance was praised by competitors Donald Trump and Larry Elder, neither of whom appeared at the debate. Trump declared Ramaswamy the winner; while Elder, who did not qualify, praised Ramaswamy's response to fatherless households in America.

Following the debate, Ramaswamy topped Google Trends and became the most searched for candidate. Ramaswamy received over one million Google searches, while competitor Haley received around 100,000 comparatively.

A post-debate poll, conducted by JL Partners, asked registered Republican voters who gave the best performance in the debate. Ramaswamy was the top candidate, with 28% selecting his performance as the best of the night. DeSantis closely followed with 27%, in addition to Pence with 13%, Scott with 8%, and Haley with 7%. FiveThirtyEight also polled Republican voters, with 29% responding that DeSantis possessed the best performance, while 26% selected Ramaswamy.

==== Second debate: September 27, 2023 ====
At the second Republican presidential debate, Ramaswamy appeared alongside six competitors. All competitors from the first debate returned, except for Hutchinson.

During the debate, Ramaswamy spoke the most, at over 12 minutes, and frequently interrupted or spoke over other candidates.

==== Canceled Fox News debate ====
Ramaswamy was due to debate fellow Republican presidential candidate Chris Christie on Special Report with Bret Baier on Fox News on October 3, 2023. However the Republican National Committee (RNC) contacted Baier and threatened to ban Ramaswamy and Christie from attending future primary debates if they were to debate on Baier's show. Ramaswamy accused the RNC of conducting "a brokered and rigged nomination process."

=== Support of President Donald Trump ===
While some candidates, including Chris Christie and Asa Hutchinson, openly criticize former president Donald Trump throughout his ongoing legal battles, Ramaswamy both defends Trump and levels unspecific criticism against the former president. Trump praised Ramaswamy for saying 'only...good things about me', and the two men have met several times.

Ramaswamy called Trump's indictment, The People of the State of New York v. Donald J. Trump, "a national disaster." Regarding the 2023 jury verdict against Trump for sexual abuse in E. Jean Carroll vs. Donald J. Trump, Ramaswamy stated "this seems like just another part of the establishment's anaphylactic response." Following the federal indictment of Donald Trump in June 2023, Ramaswamy vowed to give Trump a presidential pardon if elected.

After Trump's social media accounts were suspended following the January 6 attack on the Capitol, Ramaswamy and Jed Rubenfeld co-wrote a Wall Street Journal op-ed that called the attack "disgraceful", but argued that social media websites should be treated as state actors and that their ban of Trump violated the First Amendment.

Following the suspension of his campaign after the 2024 Iowa caucus, Ramaswamy formally endorsed Trump's campaign.

=== Wikipedia edits ===
Ramaswamy paid an editor to alter his personal Wikipedia page to appear more favorable to political conservatives before announcing his presidential campaign. Forbes reported, May 2023:

Anyone can make changes to Wikipedia articles, but it's against the rules for anyone to edit an article about themselves. It's within the rules to pay someone else to make changes on Wikipedia articles as long as those payments are disclosed. The changes to the Wikipedia page, first reported by Mediaite, were made by a user named Jhofferman, who provided the disclosure on Wikipedia.

The paid editor removed references to his involvement with the Ohio COVID-19 Response Team and his Paul & Daisy Soros Fellowship for New Americans postgraduate fellowship. Other editors later restored the removed content, citing the report. Paul and Daisy Soros are the elder brother and sister-in-law of businessman and social activist George Soros, who is the subject of numerous right-wing conspiracy theories.

Ramaswamy's campaign confirmed that it paid an editor, but denied trying to "scrub" his Wikipedia page. A campaign spokesperson said the edits were revisions of "factual distortions" and blamed a Ron DeSantis-aligned super PAC for amplifying the story.

== See also ==
- 2024 Republican Party presidential debates and forums
- Republican National Committee
- List of political editing incidents on Wikipedia
