= Steve Knight (politician) =

American politician (born 1966)

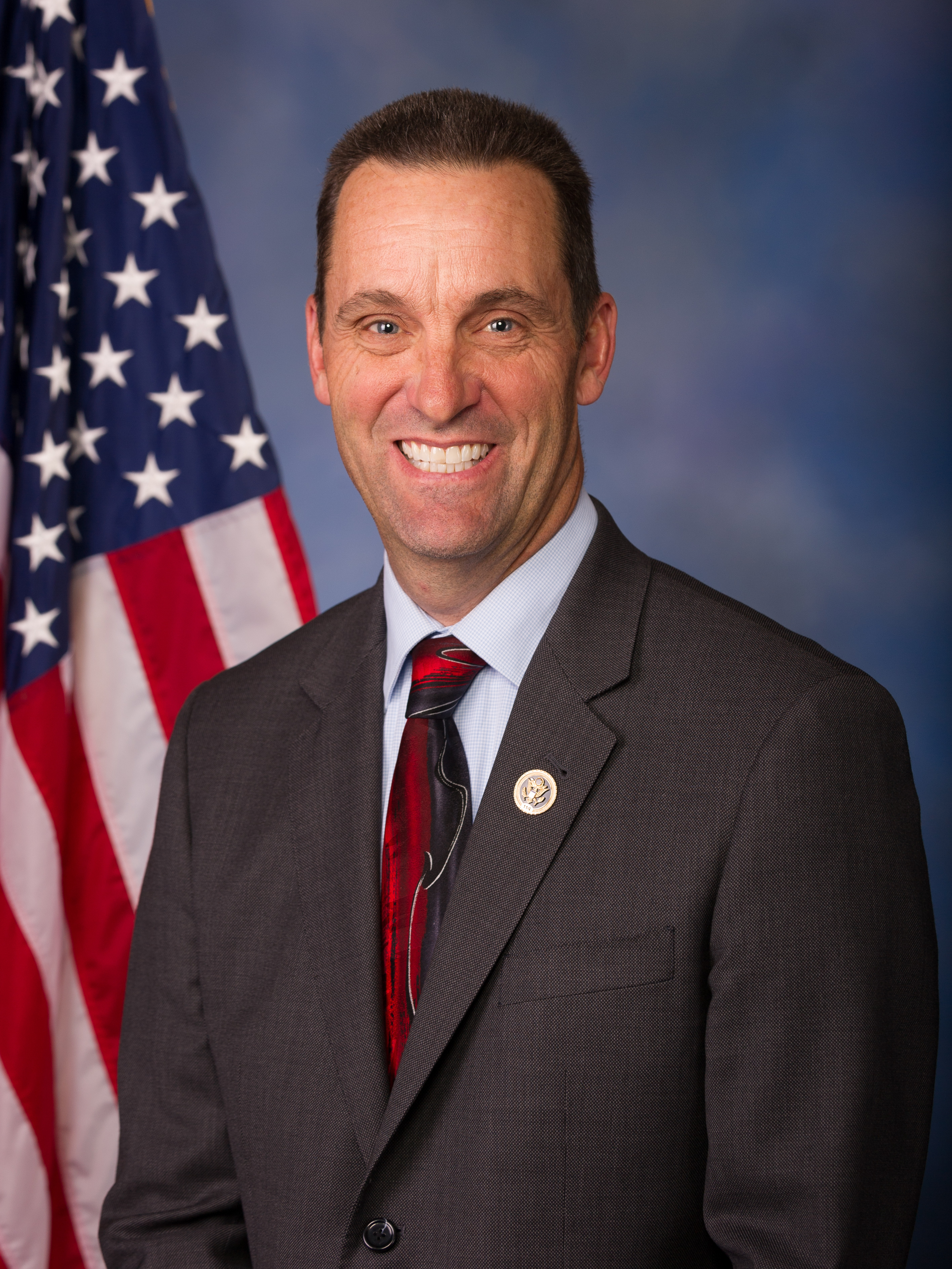
- Official portrait, 2015

Member of the U.S. House of Representatives from California's 25th district
- In office January 3, 2015 – January 3, 2019
- Preceded by: Buck McKeon
- Succeeded by: Katie Hill

Member of the California State Senate from the 21st district
- In office December 3, 2012 – January 3, 2015
- Preceded by: Carol Liu
- Succeeded by: Sharon Runner

Member of the California State Assembly from the 36th district
- In office December 1, 2008 – December 3, 2012
- Preceded by: Sharon Runner
- Succeeded by: Steve Fox

Personal details
- Born: Stephen Thomas Knight; December 17, 1966 (age 59) Edwards Air Force Base, California, U.S.
- Party: Republican
- Spouse: Lily
- Relatives: William J. Knight (father)
- Education: Antelope Valley College (AA)

Military service
- Branch/service: United States Army
- Years of service: 1985–1993
- Knight's voice Knight on Childhood Cancer Awareness Month. Recorded September 7, 2018

Stephen Thomas Knight (born December 17, 1966) is an American politician, military veteran and former police officer. A member of the Republican Party, he served two terms as the U.S. representative for California's 25th congressional district from 2015 to 2019. Knight previously represented California's 21st State Senate district from 2012 to 2015 and California's 36th State Assembly district from 2008 through 2012; he also served as Assistant Minority Leader in the California State Assembly from 2010 until 2012.

Knight served in the U.S. Army from 1985 to 1993 and 18 years with the Los Angeles Police Department (LAPD). He was elected to the Palmdale City Council from December 5, 2005, to December 1, 2008, preceded by Enrique Sanchez Lopez and succeeded by Laura Bettencourt. He lost his reelection bid in 2018 to Democrat Katie Hill. After Hill resigned the following year, he ran in the 2020 special election to complete her term, as well as the concurrent election for the next term, but he did not advance past the primary in either election.

== Early life, military service, and private career ==
Knight was born at Edwards Air Force Base in Antelope Valley, California, in 1966. After graduating from Palmdale High School, he served in the U.S. Army (1985–87) as a tracked vehicle systems mechanic in Friedberg, Germany. When his tour ended, he served in the Army Reserve until 1993. In 2006, Knight received an Associate of Arts (AA) from Antelope Valley College.

Knight served for 18 years with the Los Angeles Police Department, where he was selected to serve on the Community Resources Against Street Hoodlums (CRASH) team. He served on the Palmdale City Council and represented the north Los Angeles County area in both the California State Assembly and the California State Senate.

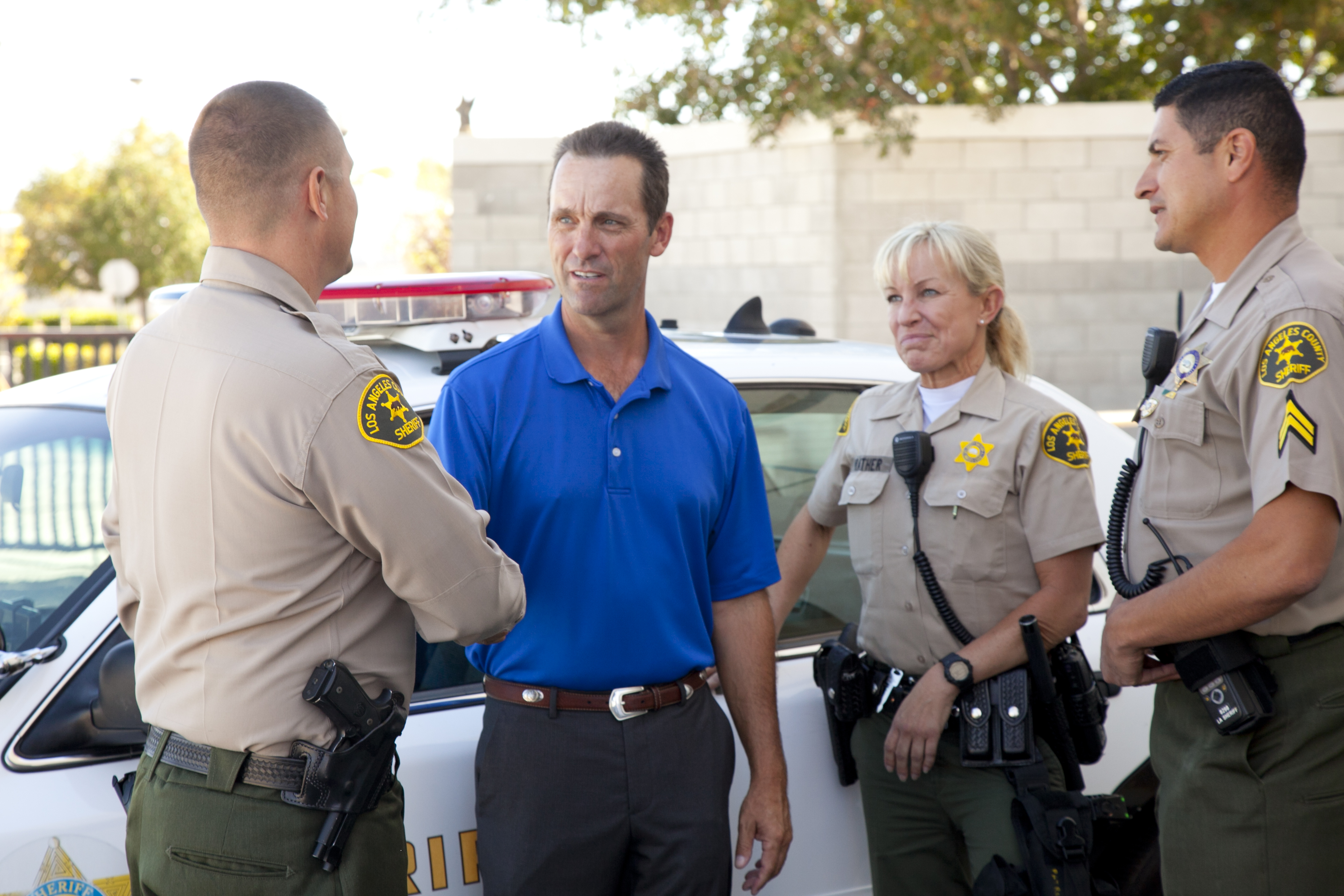
Steve Knight speaks with members of the Los Angeles County Sheriff's Department

== California State Legislature ==
Knight was elected to the California State Assembly in November 2008, succeeding Sharon Runner. From 2010 to 2012, he was the Assistant Minority Leader of the California State Assembly. He was elected to the California State Senate in 2012, in which he represented the 21st District until 2014. His father, the late William J. "Pete" Knight, served as Republican state senator in the Antelope Valley. Knight's brother David is gay, and he had a gay paternal uncle who died of AIDS.

In the State Assembly, Knight was Vice Chairman of the Natural Resources and Public Safety Committee and served on the Aerospace; Local Government; Utilities and Commerce; and Rules Committees.

In September 2014, California Governor Jerry Brown signed a bill introduced by Knight that aimed to protect California's disabled veterans by fixing an issue with property tax exemptions.

== U.S. House of Representatives ==
=== Elections ===
==== 2014 ====
Knight focused his 2014 campaign on jobs and education. The Los Angeles Daily News endorsed Knight in the 2014 primary election.

Due to California's blanket primary system, Knight faced fellow Republican Tony Strickland in the November 4, 2014, general election. Knight defeated Strickland with 53% of the vote.

In April 2015, Knight had a verbal altercation with a protester. After the protester made physical contact by forcefully gripping Knight's hand and patting him on the shoulder, Knight told him, "I'll drop your ass", but later apologized.

The Aliso Canyon Gas Leak from an underground natural gas storage facility owned by the Southern California Gas Company (SoCalGas), a subsidiary of Sempra Energy occurred in Knight's district and became public in October 2015. Knight was criticized by some constituents for his reaction to the leak. He did not visit the Porter Ranch gas leak site until January 8, 2016, saying that he did not want to politicize the problem. Knight declined to co-sign a request for an investigation by the Environmental Protection Agency (EPA) with Representative Brad Sherman of the neighboring Congressional district. He wrote in an op-ed that EPA involvement would "hinder the ongoing process". Knight said in December 2015 that he was confident that SoCalGas was “working on this as diligently as they can.”

==== 2016 ====
In May 2015, the National Republican Congressional Committee named Knight to its Patriot Program. The program gives added attention by the party to reelection campaigns in districts most likely to switch to Democratic representation in upcoming elections.

In June 2016, analyst David Wasserman moved Knight's district into the "toss-up" category, due to the negative influence of Republican presidential nominee Donald Trump on down-ticket races and the growth in Democratic voter registration in the 25th Congressional District. In addition to Knight, two Democrats and one other Republican filed to run in the district's blanket primary, which took place on June 7, 2016. Knight and Democrat Bryan Caforio advanced to the general election.

Knight was endorsed by the Los Angeles Daily News. He was also endorsed by Lou Vince, an L.A. police lieutenant and Democrat who finished third (behind Knight and Bryan Caforio) in the 25th district's June 2016 primary.

In October 2016, the Ventura County Star endorsed Knight's re-election, praising his "record of service to the residents" and saying that he "showed in his first term that generally he continues to tackle issues of local concern, provide local constituent services and represents the values of the majority of voters in that district."

Knight did not make an endorsement in the 2016 U.S. presidential election, saying that he could not support Democratic nominee Hillary Clinton or Republican nominee Donald Trump. Knight said he was "deeply disturbed" by reports that in 2005 Trump bragged about grabbing and groping women without their consent.

Knight was re-elected in the general election on November 8, 2016. He defeated Democrat Bryan Caforio with 54% of the vote.

==== 2018 ====
On February 21, 2018, Ambassador John Bolton endorsed Knight and nine other Congressional candidates who had served in the U.S. military, despite Bolton's endorsement of Knight's opponent in the 2014 primary. Bolton's PAC contributed $70,000 to each candidate's campaign.

In 2018, the Los Angeles Times described Knight as fighting "to keep his place as the last GOP incumbent representing an L.A. County-based district."

On November 7, 2018, Knight conceded the election to Democrat Katie Hill, saying "The voters have spoken."

=== Tenure ===
In May 2018, Knight's H.R. 3210, the Securely Expediting Clearances Through Reporting Transparency (SECRET) Act, which seeks to improve the protection of classified information while also expediting security clearances for government employees, was signed into law.

Knight did not make an endorsement in the 2016 U.S. presidential election, saying that he could not support Democratic nominee Hillary Clinton or Republican nominee Donald Trump. Knight said he was "deeply disturbed" by reports that in 2005 Trump bragged about grabbing and groping women without their consent. In December 2016, Knight revealed that he voted for Trump after all.

In February 2017, he voted against a resolution that would have directed the House to request 10 years of Trump's tax returns, which would then have been reviewed by the House Ways and Means Committee in a closed session.

In May 2017, Knight became the third House Republican from California to support the appointment of a special prosecutor to probe Russian involvement in the 2016 election. "There is so much conflicting information from many sources; Americans deserve the opportunity to learn the truth," he said.

FiveThirtyEight found that Knight voted with President Trump 99% of the time, and was the seventh-most partisan Trump supporter in the House when compared to his district's voting patterns.

=== Committee assignments ===
- Committee on Armed Services
  - Subcommittee on Tactical Air and Land Forces
  - Subcommittee on Seapower and Projection Forces
- Committee on Science, Space and Technology
  - Subcommittee on Energy (Vice Chair)
  - Subcommittee on Space
  - Subcommittee on Research and Technology
- Committee on Small Business
  - Subcommittee on Contracting and Workforce (Chair)
  - Subcommittee on Investigations, Oversight and Regulations

=== Caucus memberships ===
- House Aerospace Caucus
- Alzheimer's Disease Task Force
- Republican Law Enforcement Task Force
- 21st Century Agency Reform Task Force
- Congressional Lupus Caucus
- Congressional Military Family Caucus
- Congressional Unmanned Systems Caucus
- Congressional NASA Caucus
- Climate Solutions Caucus

Knight was a member of the Republican Main Street Partnership.

== Electoral history ==
California's 25th congressional district election, 2014
Primary election
| Party | Candidate | Votes | % |
|---|---|---|---|
| Republican | Tony Strickland | 19,090 | 29.6 |
| Republican | Steve Knight | 18,327 | 28.4 |
| Democratic | Lee Rogers | 14,315 | 22.2 |
| Democratic | Evan "Ivan" Thomas | 6,149 | 9.5 |
| Republican | Troy Castagna | 3,805 | 5.9 |
| Libertarian | David Koster Bruce | 1,214 | 1.9 |
| No party preference | Michael Mussack | 933 | 1.4 |
| Republican | Navraj Singh | 699 | 1.1 |
| Total votes | | 64,532 | 100.0 |
General election
| Republican | Steve Knight | 60,847 | 53.3 |
| Republican | Tony Strickland | 53,225 | 46.7 |
| Total votes | | 114,072 | 100.0 |
| Republican hold | | | |

California's 25th congressional district election, 2016
Primary election
| Party | Candidate | Votes | % |
|---|---|---|---|
| Republican | Steve Knight (incumbent) | 63,769 | 48.3 |
| Democratic | Bryan Caforio | 38,382 | 29.0 |
| Democratic | Lou Vince | 20,327 | 15.4 |
| Republican | Jeffrey Moffatt | 9,620 | 7.3 |
| No party preference | Jeff Bomberger (write-in) | 44 | 0.0 |
| Total votes | | 132,142 | 100.0 |
General election
| Republican | Steve Knight (incumbent) | 138,755 | 53.1 |
| Democratic | Bryan Caforio | 122,406 | 46.9 |
| Total votes | | 261,161 | 100.0 |
| Republican hold | | | |

California's 25th congressional district election, 2018
Primary election
| Party | Candidate | Votes | % |
|---|---|---|---|
| Republican | Steve Knight (incumbent) | 61,411 | 51.8 |
| Democratic | Katie Hill | 24,507 | 20.7 |
| Democratic | Bryan Caforio | 21,821 | 18.4 |
| Democratic | Jess Phoenix | 7,549 | 6.4 |
| Democratic | Mary Pallant | 3,157 | 2.7 |
| Total votes | | 118,445 | 100.0 |
General election
| Democratic | Katie Hill | 133,209 | 54.4 |
| Republican | Steve Knight (incumbent) | 111,813 | 45.6 |
| Total votes | | 245,022 | 100.0 |
| Democratic gain from Republican | | | |

2020 California's 25th congressional district special election
| Party | Candidate | Votes | % |
|---|---|---|---|
| Democratic | Christy Smith | 58,563 | 36.2% |
| Republican | Mike Garcia | 41,169 | 25.4% |
| Republican | Steve Knight | 27,799 | 17.2% |
| Democratic | Cenk Uygur | 10,609 | 6.6% |
| Democratic | Aníbal Valdez-Ortega | 7,368 | 4.6% |
| Republican | Courtney Lackey | 3,072 | 1.9% |
| Democratic | Robert Cooper III | 2,962 | 1.8% |
| Republican | David Lozano | 2,758 | 1.7% |
| Republican | Daniel Mercuri | 2,533 | 1.6% |
| Republican | Kenneth Jenks | 2,528 | 1.6% |
| Democratic | Getro F. Elize | 1,414 | 0.9% |
| Democratic | David Rudnick | 1,085 | 0.7% |
| Total votes | | 161,860 | 100% |

California's 25th congressional district, 2020
Primary election
| Party | Candidate | Votes | % |
|---|---|---|---|
| Democratic | Christy Smith | 49,679 | 31.7% |
| Republican | Mike Garcia | 37,381 | 23.9% |
| Republican | Steve Knight | 29,645 | 18.9% |
| Democratic | Cenk Uygur | 9,246 | 5.9% |
| Democratic | Getro Franck Elize | 6,317 | 4.0% |
| Republican | David Lozano | 6,272 | 4.0% |
| Democratic | Anibal Valdéz-Ortega | 4,920 | 3.1% |
| Democratic | Robert Cooper III | 4,474 | 2.9% |
| Republican | George Papadopoulos | 2,749 | 1.8% |
| No party preference | Otis Lee Cooper | 2,183 | 1.4% |
| Democratic | Christopher C. Smith (withdrawn) | 2,089 | 1.3% |
| Republican | Daniel Mercuri | 913 | 0.6% |
| Republican | Kenneth Jenks | 682 | 0.4% |
| Total votes | | 156,550 | 100.0% |

== Political positions ==
=== Vote Smart Political Courage Test ===
According to Vote Smart's 2016 analysis, Knight generally supported anti-abortion legislation, opposed an income tax increase, supported federal spending as a means of promoting economic growth, supported lowering taxes as a means of promoting economic growth, opposed requiring states to adopt federal education standards, supported the building of the Keystone Pipeline, supported government funding for the development of renewable energy, opposed the federal regulation of greenhouse gas emissions, opposed gun-control legislation, supported repealing the Affordable Care Act, supported requiring immigrants who are unlawfully present to return to their country of origin before they are eligible for citizenship, and supported increased American intervention in Iraq and Syria beyond air support.

=== Abortion ===
Knight is staunchly anti-abortion. Knight is not among those who make exceptions in cases of rape, incest or when a mother's life is at risk. “I am a pro-life candidate. I make no exception. I don’t have any of those three that a lot of my other Republicans have,” he said in an interview.

=== Second amendment ===
When Knight responded to the 2017 Las Vegas shooting by writing online that his prayers were "with the victims and their families" and describing it as "an unfortunate reminder of the evil in our world," he was greeted with angry comments about his opposition to gun control. Peter Marston, a professor at Cal State Northridge, defended Knight responding to the negative comments by saying it "was bad enough when there was no middle ground for people to talk about. Now we've reached the point where if you don't say what I believe, you've committed an affront to me."

=== Drug policy ===
Knight had a "C" rating from NORML regarding his voting record on cannabis-related matters. Knight says he has never smoked marijuana. He believes that cannabis should be removed as a Schedule I drug and be reclassified as a Schedule 3 drug, due to its medicinal use. Knight believes legalization should be up to individual states, yet it should remain illegal federally. He voted in favor, in 2016, for allowing veterans access to medical marijuana, if legal in their state, per their Veterans Health Administration doctor's recommendation.

=== Confederate flag ===
In 2014, Knight was one of three California legislators who voted against a measure barring the display or sale of Confederate flag images from California state museums and gift shops. Knight condemned the flag as a symbol of hate but voted against the bill on constitutional grounds, stating "It's not that I condone the Confederate flag, but I believe there are constitutional issues."

=== Military ===
Knight introduced H.R. 1162, the No Hero Left Untreated Act of 2017, which established a pilot program to implement emergent advanced technology to treat service members and veterans with PTSD and traumatic brain injuries.

On May 24, 2018, the House of Representatives voted 351 - 66 to approve the National Defense Authorization Act (NDAA) for 2019, which included the provisions of H.R. 5546, introduced in April by Knight to authorize the use of $20 million allocated to the National Guard's counterdrug programs to combat opioid trafficking and abuse. "The international illegal drug trade not only peddles poison into our communities, but is also a significant threat to national security." said Knight. "Terrorist organizations and international cartels often fund themselves through the trade of heroin, cocaine, and other illicit substances. By deploying already-existing DOD intelligence and surveillance assets to support ongoing anti-narcotics operations, we can give law enforcement agencies a huge advantage over criminals."

The NDAA, passed by the House on May 24, 2018, also included the provisions of H.R. 5707, the Sexual Trauma Response and Treatment (START) Act, introduced by Knight in May. It would establish a pilot Department of Defense program to provide comprehensive outpatient programs to military service members with military sexual trauma.

In April 2015, Knight voted to impose a one-year delay on new Department of Defense rules designed to shield military families from abusive terms on payday loans and other forms of expensive short-term credit.

=== Economy ===
In November 2017, Knight voted in favor of the Tax Cuts and Jobs Act of 2017, the house version of the Republican Party's tax reform bill. The House bill removes state and local tax breaks that many Californians use, such as the mortgage interest deduction. Several House Republicans representing Californian districts voted against the legislation because it raised taxes on Californians. Knight said after the vote that he hoped that a reconciliation version of the bill with the Senate would make the bill better: "I don't know if they're going to make it better, but we'll see. There are some things in the Senate bill I like, there are some things in there that I don't like."

According to the Los Angeles Times, immediately after the vote, the Senate version of the bill "contains even deeper cuts to state and local tax breaks that are popular with Californians but maintains the mortgage interest deduction at its current level instead of cutting it in half as the House plan does. It also repeals Obamacare's individual mandate, a move that could further complicate the situation for California members who represent districts with a lot of Obamacare enrollees." In December 2017, Knight voted in favor of the Tax Cuts and Jobs Act.

Knight stated that the new bill would "deliver tax relief to all Americans" and denied claims that the upper class would benefit more in the long-term than the middle- and lower-class. He said that the latter will get "a break on their personal taxes" and called the bill a step towards tax reform and a simplified tax code.

=== Environment ===
In September 2014, asked on a candidate questionnaire if he believed the scientific consensus on climate change, Knight wrote that California's efforts to curtail global warming were "rash," that California's law the Global Warming Solutions Act of 2006 (AB 32) was "killing California's economy", and that the federal government should not regulate greenhouse gas emissions.

In February 2016, Knight introduced a bill that would block mining at Soledad Canyon. Knight also introduced legislation intended to increase federal regulation of gas storage facilities and prevent natural gas leaks. Knight's legislation was merged into a bipartisan bill named the Protecting our Infrastructure of Pipelines and Enhancing Safety Act of 2016. In April 2016, the bill was passed unanimously by the House Transportation and Infrastructure Committee. In June 2016, Knight's bill was signed into law by President Obama.

On June 27, 2017, H.R. 2156, the St. Francis Dam Memorial Act, co-sponsored by Knight and Julia Brownley, unanimously passed the House Natural Resources Committee. It would create a national memorial at the site of the 1928 St. Francis Dam Disaster that took 431 lives.

=== Natural disaster relief ===
Knight co-sponsored the Emergency Disaster Aid Package, with Mimi Walters, to fund over $2.6 billion in relief aid to areas impacted by the California wildfires and recent hurricanes.

=== Healthcare ===
Knight was in favor of repealing the Affordable Care Act (Obamacare). He wrote "The Affordable Care Act is a prime example of bad policy" on a September 2014 candidate questionnaire. On May 4, 2017, Knight voted to repeal the Patient Protection and Affordable Care Act (Obamacare) and pass the American Health Care Act.

Knight highlighted how he contributed to an amendment to the bill that would provide $8 billion in funding over five years to help insure those with preexisting conditions in so-called "high-risk pools".

=== Immigration ===
In May 2016, Knight participated in a public debate with his Democratic challengers. In it he said that immigration reform should focus on those who want to move to the U.S. legally.

=== Israel ===
In May 2018 Knight was a member of the ten-person House delegation that attended the opening of the U.S. Embassy in Jerusalem. "It was an honor to be a part of this delegation and show support for our Israeli friends," said Knight. "Israel is our longest and closest ally in the region and still stands as the only modern democracy in the area. We share the same goals for national security, human rights, and economic relations."

=== Social Security ===
In a debate with other candidates in May 2016, Knight said, "“I think Social Security was a bad idea” and that we "should have had the government sit down with the private sector and build a system people could take with them.” Knight warned that the U.S. Social Security system retirement system will run out of money by 2030 if major changes are not implemented.

=== Aviation ===
In February 2016, Knight introduced legislation that would allow the Federal Aviation Administration to continue and expand upon its research, engineering and development programs through 2019.

Knight introduced the Aeronautics Innovation Act of 2017.

=== LGBT rights ===
Knight voted against an amendment, which ultimately failed narrowly, that stated that religious corporations, associations and institutions that receive federal contracts can't be discriminated against on the basis of religion.

=== Scientific and technological development ===
On February 13, 2018, three Knight-authored bills were passed in the House intended to "advance cutting edge research initiatives and improve STEM education." H.R. 4376, The Department of Energy Research Infrastructure Act, would fund research in advanced photonics, x-ray energy applications, and other scientific fields. The other bills were H.R. 4254, The Women in Aerospace Education Act, and H.R. 3397, The Building Blocks of STEM Act.

== Personal life ==
Knight is Roman Catholic; he lives in Palmdale with his wife Lily and their two sons.

U.S. House of Representatives
| Preceded by Buck McKeon | Member of the U.S. House of Representatives from California's 25th congressional district 2015–2019 | Succeeded by Katie Hill |
U.S. order of precedence (ceremonial)
| Preceded by Janice Hahn as Former U.S. Representative | Order of precedence of the United States as Former U.S. Representative | Succeeded by Mimi Walters as Former U.S. Representative |
