= Dante Acosta =

American politician (born 1963)

Member of the California State Assembly from the 38th district
- In office December 5, 2016 – November 30, 2018
- Preceded by: Scott Wilk
- Succeeded by: Christy Smith

Personal details
- Born: January 1, 1963 (age 63) Sacramento, California, U.S.
- Party: Republican
- Spouse: Carolyn
- Children: 3
- Education: California State University, Northridge

Dante Acosta (January 1, 1963) is an American politician who served one term in the California State Assembly. He also was appointed to the Santa Clarita Valley Water Agency board of directors but resigned after six months.

== Early life and education ==
Acosta was born January 1, 1963 the son of Hollywood actor Rodolfo Acosta and Clidine Roper. He earned a Bachelor's degree in Business Administration from the University of Phoenix. He previously worked as a car salesman and financial advisor.

== Political career ==
Acosta was elected to the Santa Clarita City Council in 2014. He then ran as a Republican to represent California's 38th State Assembly district, encompassing Simi Valley, far northern San Fernando Valley, and most of the Santa Clarita Valley. Acosta won election to the State Assembly in November 2016.

In 2018, Acosta was defeated for re-election in a rematch with his 2016 opponent, Democrat Christy Smith. In December 2018, shortly after losing the election, he was nominated and appointed to serve a four-year term on the Santa Clarita Valley Water Agency Board of Directors. Two days after his nomination, Acosta opened a campaign committee for the 2020 election. Six months later, in August 2019, Acosta resigned from the Water Board stating he was moving to El Paso, Texas to be a district director in the U.S. Small Business Administration.

== Personal life ==
Acosta is married to Carolyn with whom he has two children. Their eldest son was a US Army combat medic who was killed in Afghanistan in 2011.

== 2018 California State Assembly ==
California's 38th State Assembly district election, 2018
Primary election
Party	Candidate	Votes	%
Republican	Dante Acosta (incumbent)	49,825	53.6
Democratic	Christy Smith	43,050	46.4
Total votes		92,875	100.0
General election
Democratic	Christy Smith	95,751	51.5
Republican	Dante Acosta (incumbent)	90,298	48.5
Total votes		186,049	100.0
Democratic gain from Republican			

== 2016 California State Assembly ==
California's 38th State Assembly district election, 2016
Primary election
Party	Candidate	Votes	%
Democratic	Christy Smith	44,755	44.7
Republican	Dante Acosta	36,236	36.2
Republican	Tyler Izen	10,998	11.0
Republican	Jarrod R. Degonia	8,215	8.2
Total votes		100,204	100.0
General election
Republican	Dante Acosta	102,977	52.9
Democratic	Christy Smith	91,801	47.1
Total votes		194,778	100.0
Republican hold			
