= Mike Garcia (politician) =

American politician (born 1976)

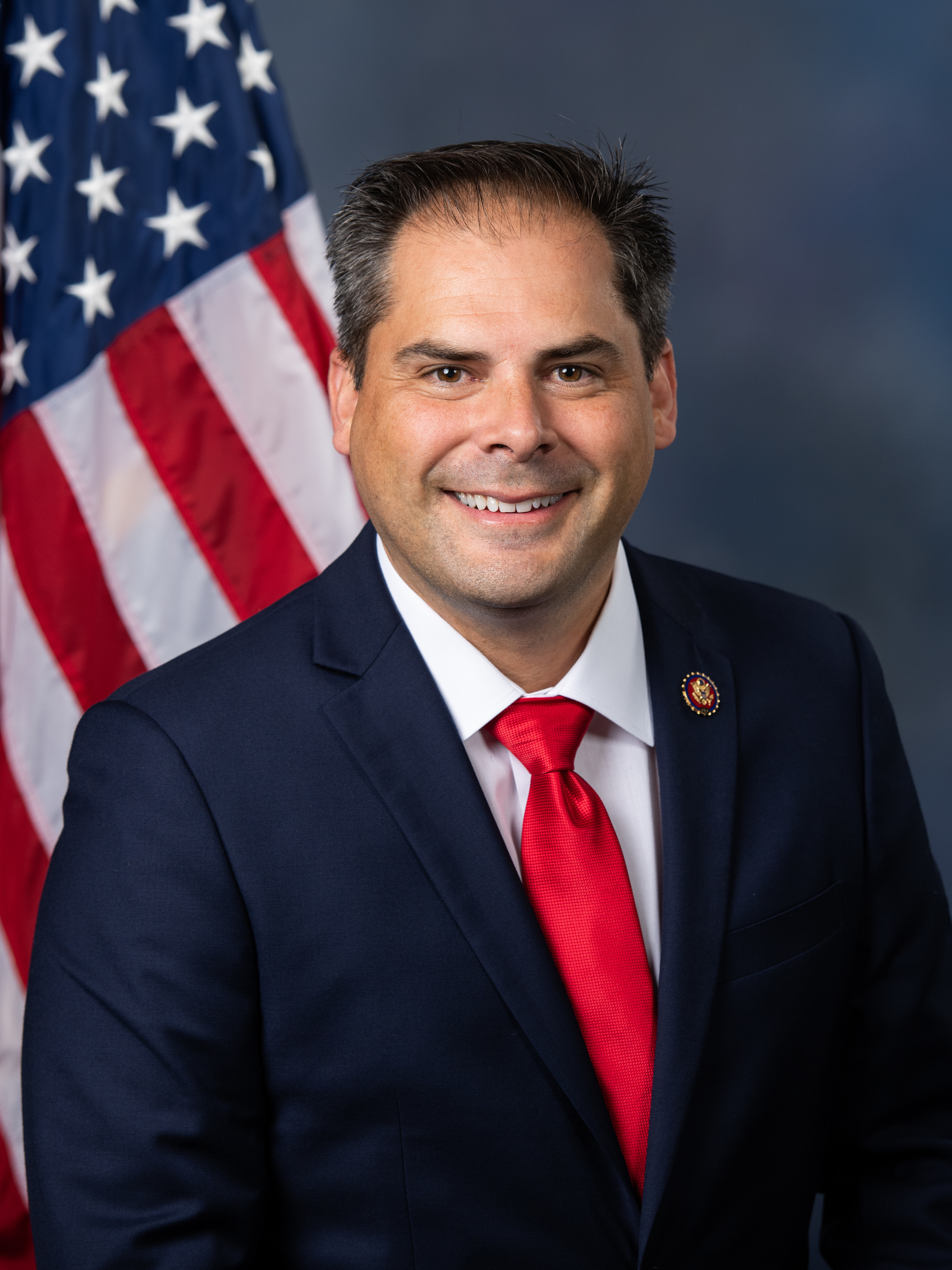
- Official portrait, 2020

Member of the U.S. House of Representatives from California
- In office May 12, 2020 – January 3, 2025 (Note: Garcia's official service begins on the date of the special election, while he was not sworn in until May 19, 2020.)
- Preceded by: Katie Hill
- Succeeded by: George Whitesides
- Constituency: 25th district (2020–2023); 27th district (2023–2025)

Personal details
- Born: Michael Joseph Garcia; April 24, 1976 (age 50) Los Angeles, California, U.S.
- Party: Republican
- Spouse: Rebecca Rollins (m. 2013)
- Children: 2
- Education: United States Naval Academy (BS); Georgetown University (MA)

Military service
- Branch/service: United States Navy
- Years of service: 1998–2009 (active); 2009–2012 (reserve)
- Rank: Lieutenant Commander
- Battles/wars: Iraq War
- Garcia's voice Garcia on U.S. space exploration. Recorded June 16, 2021

Michael Joseph Garcia (born April 24, 1976) is an American politician and former United States Navy pilot who served as the U.S. representative for California's 27th congressional district from 2020 to 2025. A Republican, he was first elected in a May 2020 special election and went on to win a full term in the general election.

Garcia was educated at the United States Naval Academy, and Georgetown University. He served in the U.S. Navy from 1998 to 2012, participating in multiple combat missions during the Iraq War. Following his active duty in the Navy he worked at Raytheon Intelligence & Space.

Garcia has faced and defeated Democratic nominee Christy Smith in all three of his successful elections: the 2020 special election held to fill the vacancy caused by Representative Katie Hill's resignation; the 2020 general election, when he won his first full term; and the 2022 general election, when he won his second term. Garcia had initially represented California's 25th congressional district, but the district was renumbered as the 27th district following the 2020 redistricting cycle.

Garcia ran for re-election to a third full term in 2024 and was defeated in the general election by Democratic challenger George T. Whitesides.

== Early life and education ==
Mike Garcia was born on April 24, 1976, in Granada Hills, California, a suburb of Los Angeles, to parents who had immigrated from Mexico in 1959. In 1994, he graduated from Saugus High School and earned a Bachelor of Science in political science, graduating in the top 3% of his class, from the United States Naval Academy after being nominated by Representative Buck McKeon. In 1998, he earned a Master of Arts in national security policy studies from Georgetown University.

== Military and civilian career ==
Garcia was commissioned an ensign in the United States Navy in May 1998 following his graduation from the U.S. Naval Academy and was sent to flight school at Naval Air Station Pensacola. He was deployed as an F/A-18 aviator from the USS Nimitz. During the 2003 invasion of Iraq, he participated in over 30 combat missions. Garcia worked as a business development manager at Raytheon Intelligence, Information and Services, one of four business segments of Raytheon.

== U.S. House of Representatives ==
=== Elections ===
==== 2020 special ====
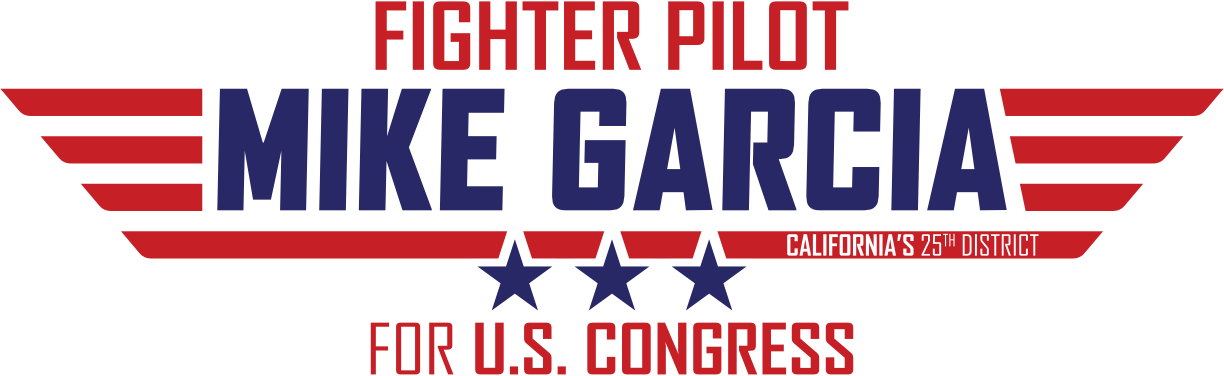
Mike Garcia's congressional campaign logo

In the 2018 election in California's 25th congressional district, Democrat Katie Hill defeated incumbent Representative Steve Knight. In April 2019, Garcia announced that he would challenge Hill in the 2020 election. On November 3, 2019, Hill resigned from Congress due to a scandal involving her relationship with a campaign staffer. Governor Gavin Newsom ordered a special election to fill the vacancy caused by Hill's resignation.

Garcia placed second in the nonpartisan blanket primary on March 3, 2020, ahead of former Representative Steve Knight and behind Christy Smith, a member of the California State Assembly. Garcia was endorsed by the Club for Growth and the Susan B. Anthony List.

Garcia campaigned on strengthening the United States military and cutting taxes to improve the economy, specifically in response to the COVID-19 pandemic. He also campaigned against the Democratic leadership in the California state government. His platform included promises to "defeat socialism" and "build the wall." Garcia said he was in favor of "securing and better surveillance of our borders."

On May 12, 2020, Garcia defeated Smith in the special election in an upset. She officially conceded the race the next day, but affirmed her intention to run against Garcia in the November general election for a full term in Congress. Garcia's victory marked the first time since 1998 that a Republican flipped a California congressional district held by a Democrat; in 1998, Doug Ose won in the 3rd congressional district. He is also the first Hispanic Republican representative to serve from California since Romualdo Pacheco left office in 1883, after representing the 4th congressional district.

==== 2020 general ====
In the November general election, Garcia faced Smith in a rematch. In August, Garcia was listed as one of the 10 most vulnerable House members by Roll Call. Votes were still being counted a week after the election, though Smith held a lead. Smith conceded to Garcia on November 30, 2020. Garcia raised $3 million more than Smith. Garcia won by only 333 votes.

==== 2022 ====
Garcia ran for reelection in what is now California's 27th congressional district. He defeated Christy Smith again in the November 8, 2022, general election.

==== 2024 ====
Garcia ran for re-election to a third term in the 2024 election to the US House of Representatives. In the election, he faced Democratic challenger George T. Whitesides, a businessman and former CEO of Virgin Galactic and Chief of Staff of the National Aeronautics and Space Administration under Administrator Charles Bolden. The race was considered a tossup by multiple political organizations, including the Cook Political Report and Sabato's crystal ball. Whitesides defeated Garcia for reelection in the November 5 general election. Garcia conceded the election to Whitesides on November 11, 2024, and the race was called by multiple news outlets and organizations later that day.

=== Tenure ===
Garcia was sworn into office on May 19, 2020.

In January 2021, he voted to object to Congress's certification of the states' Electoral College votes.

On October 5, 2023, Garcia signed a letter to the House Agriculture Committee along with 15 House Republicans opposing the inclusion of the Ending Agricultural Trade Suppression (EATS) Act in the 2023 farm bill. The EATS Act, introduced in response to the California farm animal welfare law Proposition 12, would have overturned state and local animal welfare laws restricting the sale of agricultural goods from animals raised in battery cages, gestation crates, and veal crates. The letter argued that the legislation would undermine states' rights and cede control over U.S. agricultural policy to the Chinese-owned pork producer WH Group and its subsidiary Smithfield Foods.

In March 2024, Garcia was one of 10 House Republicans who signed a letter to the House Agriculture Committee opposing the inclusion of the Ending Agriculture Trade Suppression (EATS) Act in the 2024 farm bill.

=== Committee assignments ===
For the 118th Congress:

- Committee on Appropriations
  - Subcommittee on Commerce, Justice, Science, and Related Agencies
  - Subcommittee on Defense
  - Subcommittee on Energy and Water Development and Related Agencies
- Committee on Science, Space, and Technology
  - Subcommittee on Space and Aeronautics
- Permanent Select Committee on Intelligence
  - Subcommittee on Defense Intelligence and Overhead Architecture
  - Subcommittee on National Security Agency and Cyber

=== Caucus memberships ===
- Republican Study Committee
- Mach 1 Caucus

== Political positions ==
Garcia has been described by The New York Times as a "relatively moderate lawmaker".

=== Certification of the 2020 election and Trump's second impeachment ===
On January 4, 2021, Garcia announced his intention to reject some states' electoral votes based on claims of fraud. On January 6, he objected to Congress's certification of the states' Electoral College votes. He later acknowledged Joe Biden's win and said the "election process has run its course".

Garcia voted against Donald Trump's second impeachment after the 2021 attack on the United States Capitol.

=== Abortion ===
According to California Catholic Daily, Garcia opposes abortion and does not support federal funding of Planned Parenthood. After winning the special election, he signed a petition to bring the Born-Alive Abortion Survivors Protection Act to the House floor for a vote. Garcia has cosponsored proposed legislation that would effectively ban abortion and some forms of birth control.

=== COVID-19 pandemic ===
During a virtual debate with Smith before the special election, Garcia said that financial aid to small businesses should be administered through cities and local chambers of commerce.

Garcia has called on the United States House Select Subcommittee on the Coronavirus Crisis to investigate Governor Gavin Newsom's policy on nursing homes during the pandemic. Along with other Republican representatives, Garcia claimed that Newsom had ignored guidance provided by the Centers for Medicare & Medicaid Services.

Garcia voted against the American Rescue Plan Act of 2021.

=== Defense ===
In 2023, Garcia criticized members of his own party for blocking an $826 billion defense appropriations bill for the 2024 fiscal year. In his criticism, Garcia said that the far-right Republicans stalling the bill on procedural grounds were "enabling the failed defense policies" of the Biden administration "and accelerating the downward trajectory of our nation's security."

During the debate on the 2024 defense appropriations bill, which included a fifth round of aid to Ukraine, Garcia said "I'm not necessarily opposed to supporting the Ukrainians further, but I am opposed to doing it at this point without some sort of explanation from the executive branch, Secretary of Defense [Lloyd Austin] telling us what we are doing with this money and where it's going and what the end state is."

=== Health care ===
Garcia has advocated for repealing the Patient Protection and Affordable Care Act. During his campaign, he said he "was not a big fan of Medicaid."

=== Immigration ===
Garcia supports the construction of a wall along the Mexico–United States border. He is in favor of increasing surveillance at the border. Garcia has voiced opposition to the DREAM Act and giving amnesty to illegal immigrants who entered the United States as children.

=== Iraq ===
In June 2021, Garcia was one of 49 House Republicans to vote to repeal the AUMF against Iraq.

=== Israel ===
Garcia voted to support Israel following the 2023 Hamas attack on Israel.

=== LGBT rights ===
In 2021, Garcia voted against the Equality Act, calling it "contrary to American ideals".

On July 19, 2022, Garcia and 46 other Republican U.S. representatives voted for the Respect for Marriage Act, which codified the right to same-sex marriage in federal law.

=== Term limits ===
In May 2020, Garcia said that he supports congressional term limits.

=== Tax policy ===
In January 2021, Garcia introduced the State and Local Tax (SALT) Fairness Act, a bill to eliminate the SALT deduction cap created in the Tax Cuts and Jobs Act of 2017. Compared to residents of other states, Californians are disproportionately impacted by the SALT deduction cap.

=== Antitrust bill ===
In 2022, Garcia was one of 39 Republicans to vote for the Merger Filing Fee Modernization Act of 2022, an antitrust package that would crack down on corporations for anti-competitive behavior.

=== DC statehood ===
Garcia opposes statehood for Washington DC. In April 2021, Garcia voted against the Washington, D.C., Admission Act.

== Personal life ==
Garcia's wife Rebecca is an interior designer. They have two sons. Garcia and his family live in Santa Clarita, California.

== Electoral history ==
2020 California's 25th congressional district special election
Party	Candidate	Votes	%
Democratic	Christy Smith	58,563	36.2%
Republican	Mike Garcia	41,169	25.4%
Republican	Steve Knight	27,799	17.2%
Democratic	Cenk Uygur	10,609	6.6%
Democratic	Aníbal Valdez-Ortega	7,368	4.6%
Republican	Courtney Lackey	3,072	1.9%
Democratic	Robert Cooper III	2,962	1.8%
Republican	David Lozano	2,758	1.7%
Republican	Daniel Mercuri	2,533	1.6%
Republican	Kenneth Jenks	2,528	1.6%
Democratic	Getro F. Elize	1,414	0.9%
Democratic	David Rudnick	1,085	0.7%
Total votes		161,860	100%

2020 California's 25th congressional district special election runoff
Party	Candidate	Votes	%
Republican	Mike Garcia	95,088	54.9%
Democratic	Christy Smith	78,234	45.1%
Total votes		173,322	100%
Republican gain from Democratic			

California's 25th congressional district, 2020
Primary election
Party	Candidate	Votes	%
Democratic	Christy Smith	49,679	31.7%
Republican	Mike Garcia	37,381	23.9%
Republican	Steve Knight	29,645	18.9%
Democratic	Cenk Uygur	9,246	5.9%
Democratic	Getro Franck Elize	6,317	4.0%
Republican	David Lozano	6,272	4.0%
Democratic	Anibal Valdéz-Ortega	4,920	3.1%
Democratic	Robert Cooper III	4,474	2.9%
Republican	George Papadopoulos	2,749	1.8%
No party preference	Otis Lee Cooper	2,183	1.4%
Democratic	Christopher C. Smith (withdrawn)	2,089	1.3%
Republican	Daniel Mercuri	913	0.6%
Republican	Kenneth Jenks	682	0.4%
Total votes		156,550	100.0%
General election
Republican	Mike Garcia (incumbent)	169,638	50.05%
Democratic	Christy Smith	169,305	49.95%
Total votes		338,933	100.0%
Republican hold			

2022 California's 27th congressional district
Primary election
Party	Candidate	Votes	%
Republican	Mike Garcia (incumbent)	57,469	47.1
Democratic	Christy Smith	45,675	37.4
Democratic	Quaye Quartey	8,303	6.8
Democratic	Ruth Luevanos	6,668	5.5
Republican	David Rudnick	2,648	2.2
Republican	Mark Pierce	1,352	1.1
Total votes		122,115	100.0
General election
Republican	Mike Garcia (incumbent)	104,536	53.2
Democratic	Christy Smith	91,782	46.8
Total votes		196,318	100.0
Republican hold			

California's 27th congressional district, 2024
Primary election
Party	Candidate	Votes	%
Republican	Mike Garcia (incumbent)	74,245	54.9
Democratic	George Whitesides	44,391	32.8
Democratic	Steve Hill	16,525	12.2
Total votes		135,161	100.0
General election
Democratic	George Whitesides	154,040	51.3
Republican	Mike Garcia (incumbent)	146,050	48.7
Total votes		300,090	100.0
Democratic gain from Republican			

== See also ==
- List of Hispanic and Latino Americans in the United States Congress

U.S. House of Representatives
Preceded by Katie Hill	Member of the U.S. House of Representatives from California's 25th congressional district 2020–2023	Succeeded by Raul Ruiz
Preceded by Judy Chu	Member of the U.S. House of Representatives from California's 27th congressional district 2023–2025	Succeeded by George Whitesides
U.S. order of precedence (ceremonial)
Preceded by Mimi Walters as Former U.S. Representative	Order of precedence of the United States as Former U.S. Representative	Succeeded by Michelle Steel as Former U.S. Representative
