= 2020 California's 25th congressional district special election =

- March 3, 2020 (first round); May 12, 2020 (runoff)

California's 25th congressional district
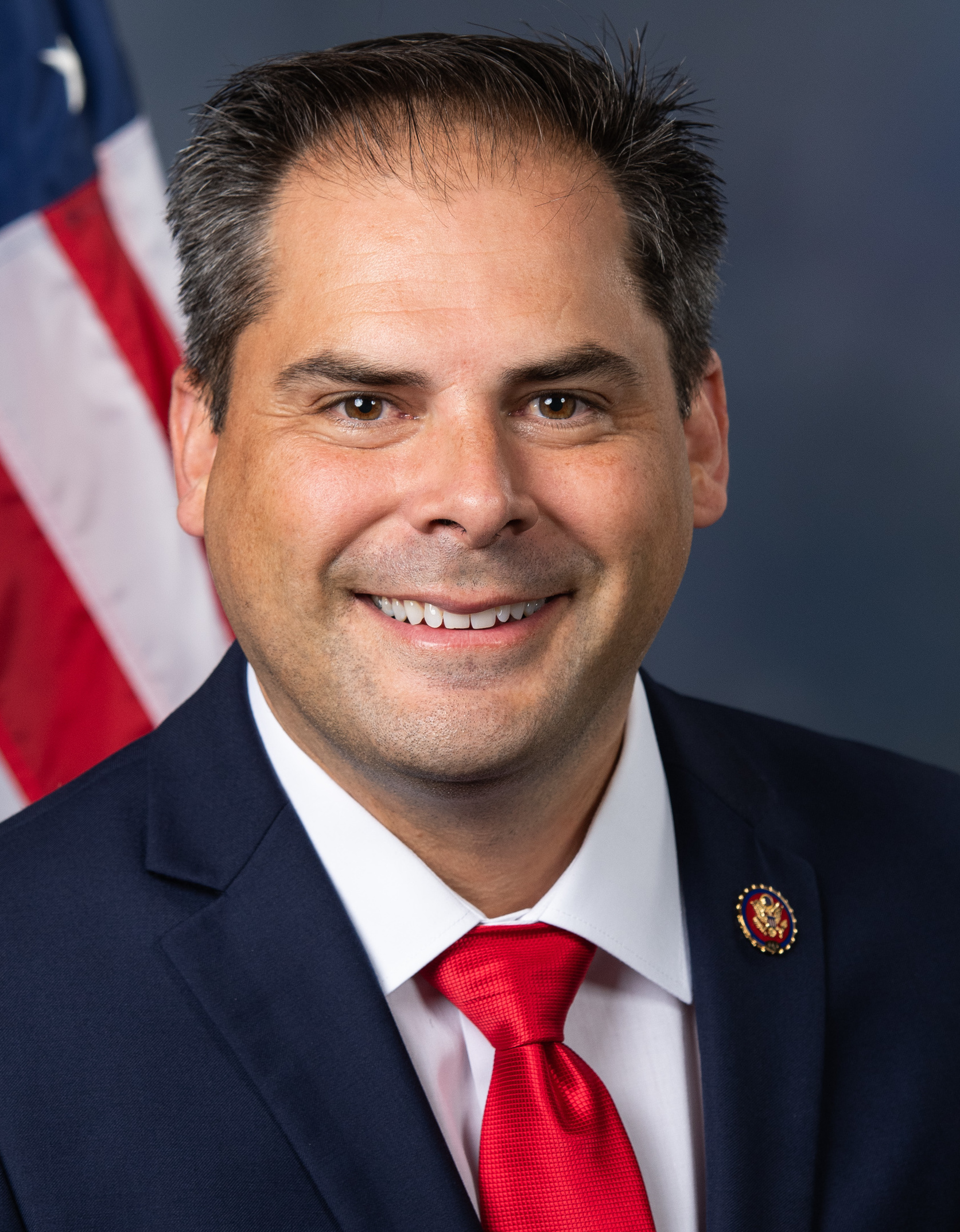

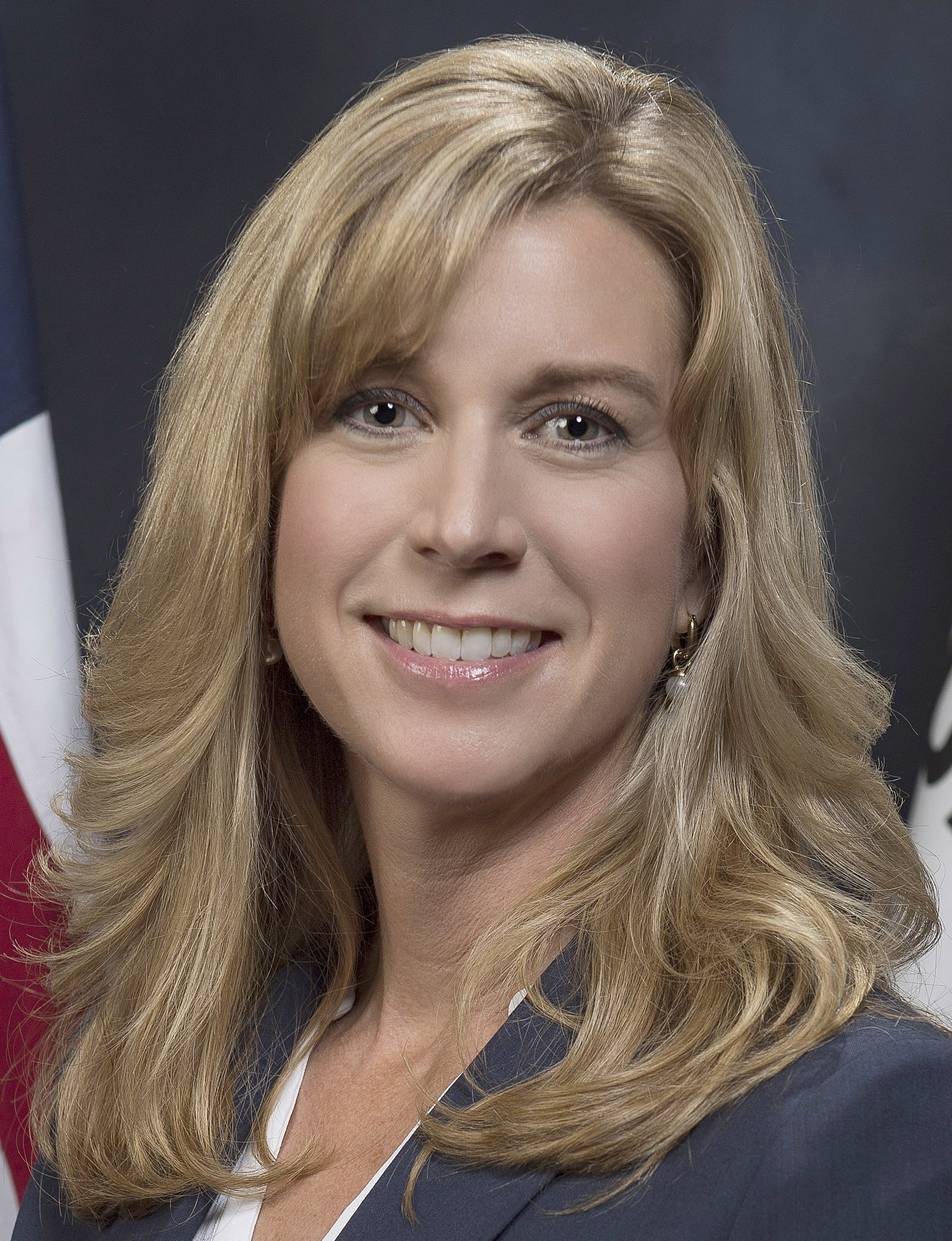

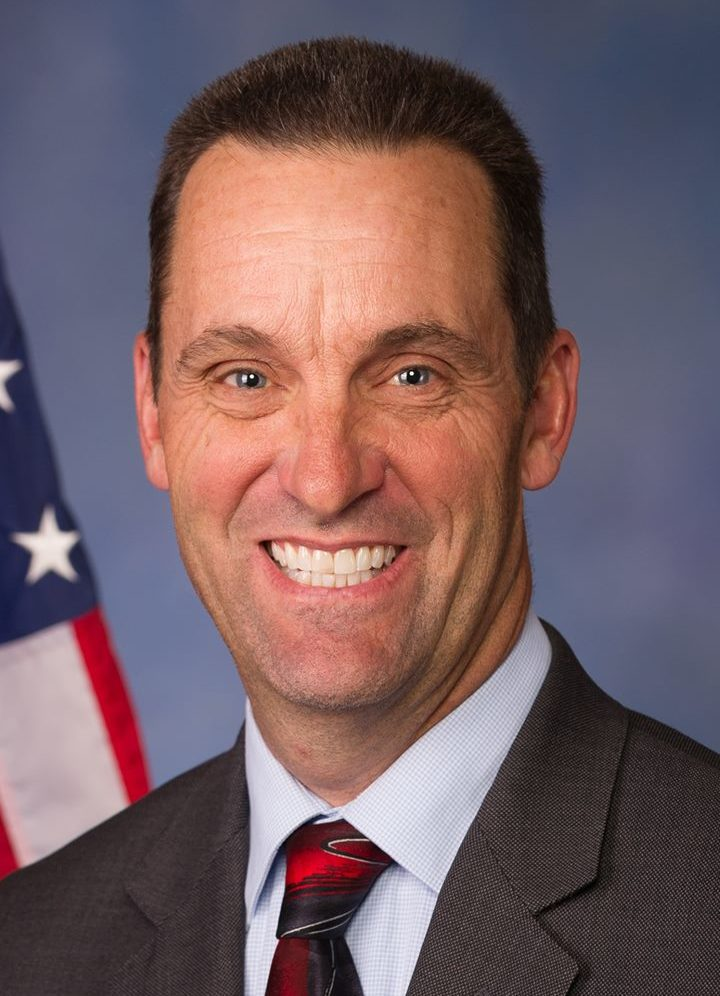

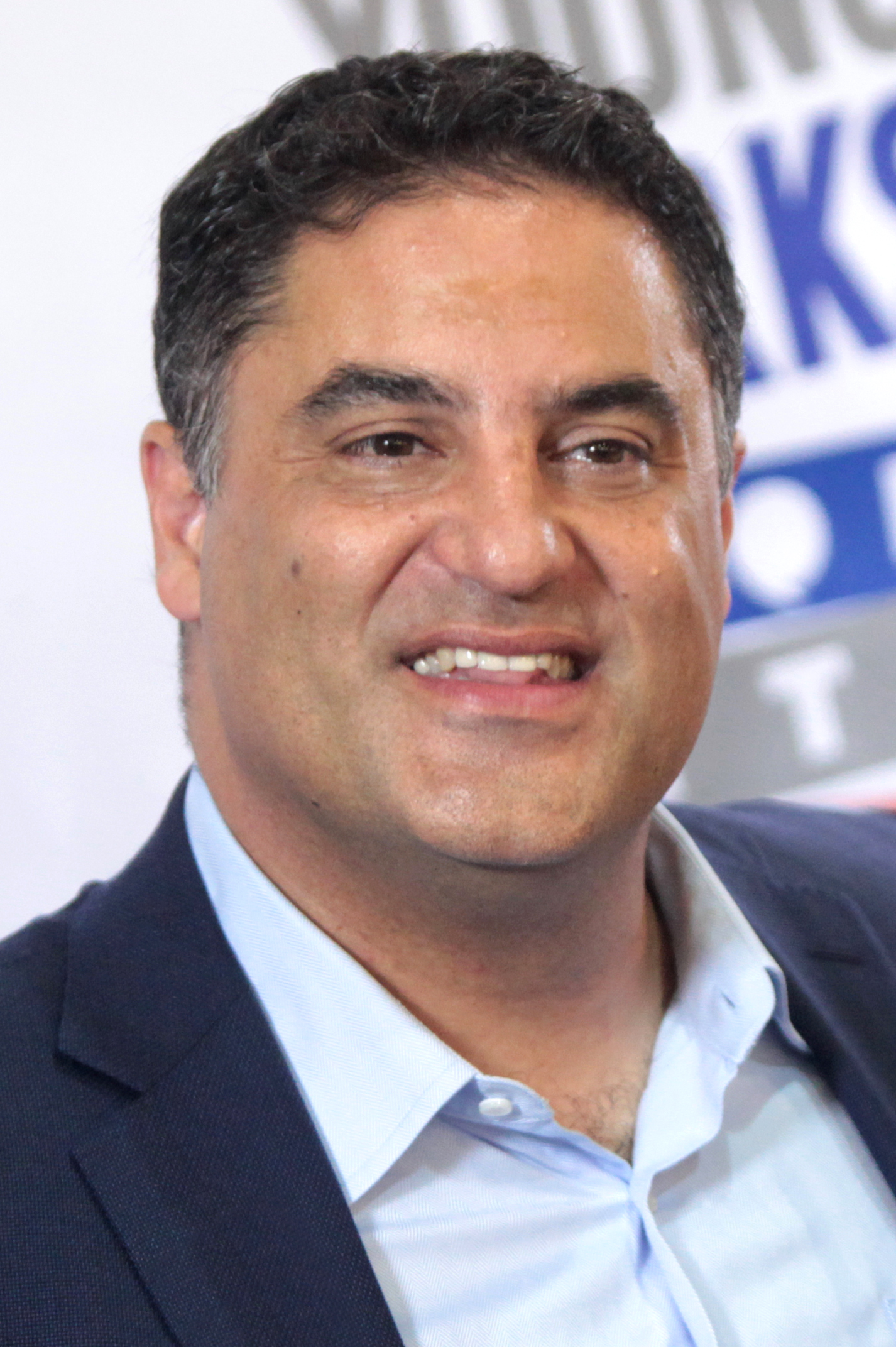
Candidate	Mike Garcia	Christy Smith
Party	Republican	Democratic
First round	41,365; 25.4%	58,920; 36.2%
Runoff	95,667; 54.9%	78,721; 45.1%
Candidate	Steve Knight	Cenk Uygur
Party	Republican	Democratic
First round	27,911; 17.1%	10,699; 6.6%
Runoff	Eliminated	Eliminated
- Garcia: 50–60% Smith: 30–40%
U.S. Representative before election
Katie Hill
Democratic
Elected U.S. Representative
Mike Garcia
Republican

A special election to the United States House of Representatives for California's 25th congressional district was held March 3, 2020, the same day as the California presidential primaries. As no candidate received a majority, a runoff took place on May 12, 2020, between the top two finishers Christy Smith and Mike Garcia. Garcia's win was the first time Republicans flipped a Democratic-held House seat in California since 1998.

Katie Hill, who had been elected in 2018, had resigned on November 3, 2019 after reports of an inappropriate relationship with a campaign staffer and allegations of sexual relations with her congressional staff, as well as nude photos of her which were published without her consent. Steve Knight, who had represented the district until 2019, ran in the primary but did not advance to the runoff.

By winning the special election, Garcia finished the remaining balance of Hill's term in the 116th Congress. A separate primary and general election on March 3, 2020, and on November 3, 2020, respectively, was held to determine the representative for the 117th Congress; Garcia narrowly defeated Smith in a rematch and again for a second full term in 2022.

== Background ==
Buck McKeon (R) represented the district from 1993 until he retired in 2014. Steve Knight (R) then won over Tony Strickland (R) in the 2014 election and served until he was defeated by Katie Hill (D) in 2018 by 8.8 percentage points.

Hill resigned in October 2019 following a scandal in which she admitted to an "inappropriate relationship" with a campaign staffer and nude photos of her were published without her consent.

On November 15, 2019, the Governor of California, Gavin Newsom, issued a proclamation declaring a special election for the 25th Congressional District on May 12, 2020, with a primary on March 3, 2020.

In recent presidential elections the district narrowly voted for Barack Obama (D) in 2008 and Mitt Romney (R) in 2012, while Hillary Clinton (D) won the district by 7 percentage points in 2016.

== Candidates ==
California uses a primary system in which all candidates run in a single primary regardless of political party. In regular congressional elections, the top two vote getters in the primary advance to a runoff election regardless of party affiliation or vote tally. However, in the special election for the balance of Hill's term, had a candidate received more than 50% of the primary vote, they would have been automatically elected and the runoff election cancelled.

On October 31, 2019, at least a dozen people had filed paperwork with the FEC to run for the seat. According to the certified list of candidates signed by the Secretary of State of California on January 15, 2020, six Democrats and six Republicans had filed for the special election and would appear on the ballot.

Democratic candidate Christopher Smith ended his campaign shortly after participating in the January 9 debate. While stopping short of a full endorsement, he stated, "among the remaining field, the progressive candidate with the best chance of winning is Cenk Uygur."

=== Democratic Party ===
==== Declared ====
- Robert Cooper III, university professor
- Getro Franck Elize, patient resource worker
- David Rudnick, businessman, real estate investor, political activist and U.S. Marine Corps veteran
- Christy Smith, state assemblywoman
- Cenk Uygur, co-founder, CEO, and host of The Young Turks; co-founder of Justice Democrats and founder of Wolf PAC
- Aníbal Valdez-Ortega, attorney and community organizer

==== Declined ====
- Alex Padilla, Secretary of State of California
- Henry Stern, state senator

==== Withdrawn ====
- Christopher C. Smith, documentary filmmaker

=== Republican Party ===
==== Declared ====
- Mike Garcia, U.S. Navy veteran and businessman
- Kenneth Jenks, U.S. Marine Corps veteran and telecommunications executive
- Steve Knight, former U.S. representative
- Courtney Lackey, businesswoman
- David Lozano, attorney and business owner
- Daniel R. Mercuri, business owner

==== Declined ====
- Mike Cernovich, political commentator
- Keith Mashburn, Mayor of Simi Valley
- Rex Parris, Mayor of Lancaster
- Tony Strickland, former state senator

==== Withdrawn ====
- Mark Cripe, Los Angeles County deputy sheriff
- Angela Underwood-Jacobs, Lancaster city councilwoman

== Special election ==
The special election and the primary election for the regular general election for California's 25th congressional district was held on March 3, 2020. The normal primary election determined which two candidates would advance to the 2020 general election, while the special election was to determine who will finish the remainder of Hill's term. No candidate in the special election received more than 50% of the vote so the top two candidates advanced to a runoff to be held on May 12, 2020.

Several candidates were on the ballot in both elections on March 3, as these elections concern two different Congresses.

=== Debates ===
On December 22, 2019, Democratic candidates Christopher Smith, Aníbal Valdéz-Ortega and Cenk Uygur called on Christy Smith, Robert Cooper III and Getro Elize to attend a primary debate "to be held tentatively at College of the Canyons on Thursday, January 9, 2020". The Talk of Santa Clarita, an interview podcast within the district that hosted a Democratic debate during the 2018 election and has interviewed both Christy Smith and Cenk Uygur, also volunteered to host a primary debate for the Democratic candidates on January 25, 2020.

Uygur stated on January 4 that all of the Democratic candidates, with the notable exception of Christy Smith, will attend a debate in Palmdale (at Transplants Brewing Company) on January 9, 2020. Despite receiving an offer by the other candidates to change the date of the debate to better accommodate her, Christy Smith's campaign has stated that her work in the State Assembly prevents her from attending the debate, which was set to be moderated by The Talk of Santa Clarita. Christy Smith's campaign was given several opportunities to debate on different dates at different venues, including future debates unrelated to the Brewing Company debate, but her campaign also declined, with no reasons given.

=== Predictions ===
Source	Ranking	As of
The Cook Political Report	Likely D	January 24, 2020

=== Endorsements ===
Mike Garcia (R)

Federal politicians

- Elton Gallegly, former U.S. representative (CA-24)
- Buck McKeon, former U.S. representative (CA-25)
- Donald Trump, 45th president of the United States

State politicians

- Pete Wilson, former U.S. senator and former governor of California

State legislators

- Tony Strickland, former state assemblyman and state senator

Local politicians

- Mel Alfarero, founder and National Chairman of Filipino American Republicans
- B.J. Atkins, director of Santa Clarita Valley Water Board
- Bill Ayub, Ventura County Sheriff
- Glen Becerra, former Simi Valley councilman
- Michael Bradbury, former Ventura County district attorney
- Bob Brooks, former Ventura County Sheriff
- Dr. Roy Burns, former President of Association of Los Angeles Deputy Sheriffs
- Dee Dee Cavanaugh, former Simi Valley councilwoman
- Steve Cooley, former Los Angeles district attorney and GOP nominee for Attorney General
- Bill Cooper, President of Santa Clarita Valley Water Board
- Stephanie English, Los Angeles County Justice Deputy - Public Safety Legislative and Policy Advisor
- Yvonne Farris, former President of the Board of Education of Ventura County
- Don Henry, President of Agua Dulce Town Council
- Mike Judge, Simi Valley councilman
- Bob Kellar, Santa Clarita councilman
- R.J. Kelly, Director of Santa Clarita Valley Water Board
- Dennis Koontz, former Santa Clarita councilman
- Dean Kunicki, former member of the Board of Education of Ventura County
- Elaine Litster, Simi Valley councilwoman
- Keith Mashburn, Mayor of Simi Valley
- Gary Martin, Vice President of Santa Clarita Valley Water Board
- Joe Messina, Trustee of the Williams S. Hart School Board
- Bill Miranda, Santa Clarita councilman
- R. Rex Parris, Mayor of Lancaster
- Nancy Smith, Trustee and Retired Superintendent of Palmdale School District
- Linda Storli, Trustee of the Williams S. Hart School Board
- Steve Sturgeon, President of the Williams S. Hart School Board
- Greg Totten, Ventura County district attorney
- Barbra Williamson, former Simi Valley councilwoman

Individuals

- Larry Elder, radio and television talk show host

Organizations

- Combat Veterans for Congress
- Los Angeles County Republican Party
- Susan B. Anthony List
- War Veterans Fund
Kenneth Jenks (R)

State politicians

- Johnnie Morgan, President, CA State Republican Assembly

Local politicians

- Phil Monroe, Captain USN (Ret.) and former Coronado City Councilman

Individuals

- A. Arvatin, WWII Col. United States Marine Corps (Ret)
- Jeffrey Smith, Master Sgt USAF (Ret) Iraqi Freedom Warrior of the Month, Enduring Freedom
Christy Smith (D)
- Kamala Harris, U.S. senator from California and former 2020 Democratic presidential candidate and Vice President of the United States
- Amy Klobuchar, U.S. senator from Minnesota and former 2020 Democratic presidential candidate

Federal politicians

- Ami Bera, U.S. representative (CA-7)
- Joe Biden, former vice president of the United States
- Barbara Boxer, lobbyist and former United States Senator from California
- Julia Brownley, U.S. representative (CA-26)
- Judy Chu, U.S. representative (CA-27)
- Dianne Feinstein, U.S. senator from California
- Jimmy Gomez, U.S. representative (CA-34)
- Mike Levin, U.S. representative (CA-49)
- Alan Lowenthal, U.S. representative (CA-47)
- Barack Obama, former president of the United States
- Nancy Pelosi, Speaker of the United States House of Representatives (CA-12)
- Harley Rouda, U.S. representative (CA-48)
- Brad Sherman, U.S. representative (CA-30)

State politicians

- Gavin Newsom, Governor of California
- Betty Yee, California State Controller

State legislators

- Rebecca Bauer-Kahan, state assemblywoman
- Autumn Burke, state assemblywoman
- Sabrina Cervantes, state assemblywoman
- Ed Chau, state assemblyman
- Susan Eggman, state assemblywoman
- Laura Friedman, state assemblywoman
- Jesse Gabriel, state assemblyman
- Cristina Garcia, state assemblywoman
- Todd Gloria, state assemblyman
- Lena Gonzalez, State Senator
- Lorena Gonzalez, state assemblywoman
- Chris Holden, state assemblyman
- Tasha Boerner Horvath, state assemblywoman
- Melissa Hurtado, state senator
- Hannah-Beth Jackson, state senator
- Ash Kalra, state assemblyman
- Sydney Kamlager-Dove, state assemblywoman
- Jacqui Irwin, state assemblywoman
- Kevin de León, former California State Senate Pro Tem
- Connie Leyva, state senator
- Monique Limón, state assemblywoman
- Holly Mitchell, state senator
- Patrick O'Donnell, state assemblyman
- Cottie Petrie-Norris, state assemblywoman
- Sharon Quirk-Silva, state assemblywoman
- Anthony Rendon, Speaker of the California Assembly
- Eloise Gomez Reyes, state assemblywoman
- Blanca Rubio, state assemblywoman
- Henry Stern, state senator
- Buffy Wicks, state assemblywoman

Local politicians

- David Barlavi, Saugus Union School District board member
- Joe Buscaino, Los Angeles City Councilmember
- Brian Dennert, Rancho Simi Park Director
- Jenny Hughes Fitzgerald, Conejo Valley Unified School District board member
- Robert Garcia, Mayor of Long Beach, California
- Lindsey Horvath, West Hollywood Mayor Pro Tempore
- Amy Howorth, Mayor of Manhattan Beach
- Paul Koretz, Los Angeles City Councilmember
- Sheila Kuehl, Los Angeles County Supervisor
- Julie Olsen, Saugus Union School District Governing Board President
- Jeff Prang, Los Angeles County Assessor
- David Ryu, Los Angeles City Councilmember
- Christopher Trunkey, Saugus Union School District board member
- Dr. Marc Winger, former Superintendent of Newhall School District

Labor unions

- California Labor Federation
- International Association of Fire Fighters
- International Union of Painters and Allied Trades District Council 36

Organizations

- Brady Campaign
- California League of Conservation Voters
- California Teachers Association
- Democratic Congressional Campaign Committee
- EMILY's List
- Equality California
- Human Rights Campaign
- League of Conservation Voters Action Fund
- National Women's Political Caucus
- Planned Parenthood Action Fund
- Sierra Club

Individuals

- Alex Hirsch, writer, animator and voice actor

Newspapers

- Los Angeles Times
Cenk Uygur (D)

In December 2019, Uygur stated that his campaign did not accept endorsements from outside the 25th district and requested that Bernie Sanders's and Ro Khanna's endorsements be retracted. However, his campaign received verbal support from the following notable individuals:

Individuals

- Ana Kasparian, host and executive producer of The Young Turks
- Emma Vigeland, journalist for The Young Turks
- Brianna Wu, video game developer, computer programmer, and Democratic candidate for MA-08 in 2020

Withdrawn endorsements

- Ro Khanna, U.S. representative (CA-17) (retracted at Uygur's request)
- Bernie Sanders, US Senator from Vermont and 2020 Democratic presidential candidate (retracted at Uygur's request)

=== Results ===
2020 California's 25th congressional district special election, March 3
Party	Candidate	Votes	%
Democratic	Christy Smith	58,920	36.2%
Republican	Mike Garcia	41,365	25.4%
Republican	Steve Knight	27,911	17.1%
Democratic	Cenk Uygur	10,699	6.6%
Democratic	Aníbal Valdez-Ortega	7,473	4.6%
Republican	Courtney Lackey	3,100	1.9%
Democratic	Robert Cooper III	2,986	1.8%
Republican	David Lozano	2,775	1.7%
Republican	Daniel Mercuri	2,567	1.6%
Republican	Kenneth Jenks	2,549	1.6%
Democratic	Getro F. Elize	1,434	0.9%
Democratic	F. David Rudnick	1,100	0.7%
Total votes		162,879	100%

== Runoff ==
Since no candidate in the March 3, 2020, special election received more than 50.0% of the vote, a runoff election between the top two finishers was held on May 12, 2020.

=== New endorsements ===
Mike Garcia (R)

Federal politicians

- Steve Knight, former U.S. representative (CA-25)
- Elise Stefanik, U.S. representative (NY-21)
- Michael Waltz, U.S. representative (FL-6)

Newspapers

- Los Angeles Daily News
Christy Smith (D)

Federal politicians

- Karen Bass, U.S. representative (CA-37)

Party officials

- Ryan Valencia, Ventura County Democratic Party Chair

Individuals

- John August, writer, director, producer and novelist
- Parvesh Cheena, actor
- Jon Cryer, actor, comedian and director
- Carol Mendelsohn, writer
- Bill Prady, writer and producer
- Eric Roth, writer
- Joe Spano, actor
- Steven Spielberg, director

=== Predictions ===
Source	Ranking	As of
The Cook Political Report	Tossup	April 10, 2020
Inside Elections	Likely D	April 23, 2020
Sabato's Crystal Ball	Tossup	April 23, 2020
Politico	Tossup	April 19, 2020

=== Polling ===
Poll source	Date(s) administered	Sample size (Note: Key: A – all adults RV – registered voters LV – likely voters V – unclear)	Margin of error	Mike Garcia (R)	Christy Smith (D)	Undecided
1892 Polling (R)	Mar 8–11, 2020	500 (LV)	± 4.38%	43%	39%	10%

=== Results ===
2020 California's 25th congressional district special election runoff, May 12
Party	Candidate	Votes	%	±%
Republican	Mike Garcia	95,667	54.9%	+9.3%
Democratic	Christy Smith	78,721	45.1%	−9.3%
Total votes		174,388	100.0%	N/A
Republican gain from Democratic				

By county

County	Mike Garcia Republican		Christy Smith Democratic		Margin		Total votes
County	#	%	#	%	#	%	Total votes
Los Angeles (part)	72,815	54.15	61,659	45.85	11,156	8.30	134,474
Ventura (part)	22,852	57.25	17,062	42.75	5,790	14.51	39,914
Totals	95,667	54.86	78,721	45.14	16,946	9.72	174,388

== See also ==
- 2020 United States House of Representatives elections in California
- List of special elections to the United States House of Representatives
- Super Tuesday

== Notes ==
Partisan clients
