= Christy Smith (politician) =

American politician

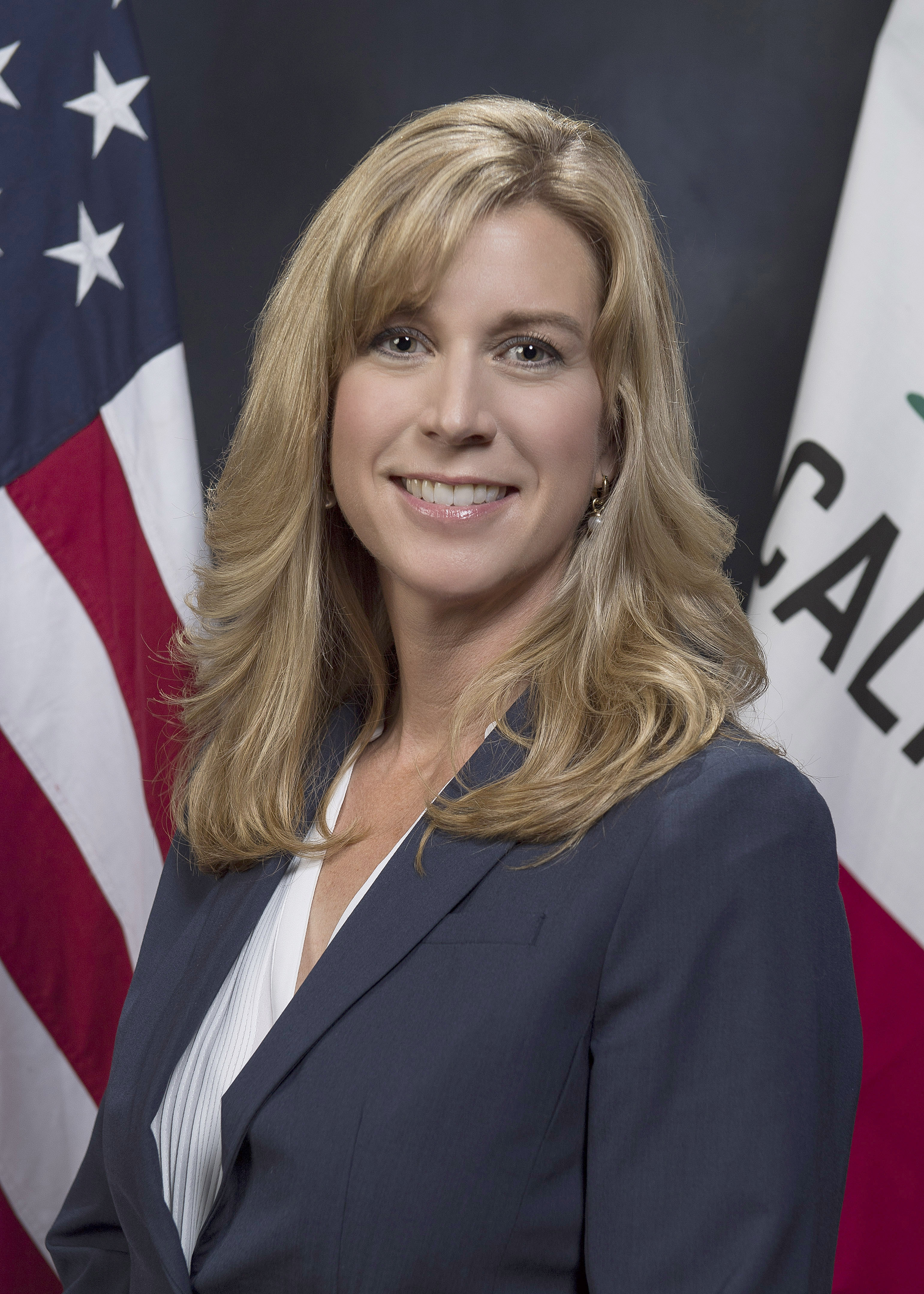
- Official portrait, 2018

Member of the California State Assembly from the 38th district
- In office December 3, 2018 – December 7, 2020
- Preceded by: Dante Acosta
- Succeeded by: Suzette Martinez Valladares

Personal details
- Born: Christy Fisher; May 15, 1969 (age 57) Würzburg, West Germany (now Germany)
- Party: Democratic
- Spouse: Phil Smith
- Children: 2
- Education: College of the Canyons; University of California, Los Angeles (BA)

Christy Smith (née Fisher, born 1969) is an American politician who served as California state assemblywoman for the 38th district from 2018 until 2020. A member of the Democratic Party, Smith ran three campaigns for Congress, losing all three to Republican Mike Garcia.

== Early life, education, and career ==
Smith was born in a U.S. Army hospital in 1969 in Würzburg, West Germany (now Germany). Her parents returned to the United States when she was six months old, settling in Fortville, Indiana, where her father, Jerry Fisher, found work at RCA Records as a mechanical engineer. They later moved to Terre Haute before finally settling down in the Santa Clarita Valley in 1979. The eldest of three children, she graduated from William S. Hart High School in Santa Clarita and attended College of the Canyons. She received her Bachelor of Arts in political science from University of California, Los Angeles in 1993. Smith then worked for the United States Department of Education as a policy analyst during the Clinton administration. She has served two terms on the board of the Newhall School District.

== California State Assembly ==
In 2016, Smith ran in California's 38th State Assembly district. The seat was open after Republican incumbent Scott Wilk decided to run for State Senate. Although she led the candidate field in the open primary in June, she eventually lost to Republican Santa Clarita city councilman Dante Acosta, 52.87% to 47.13%, in the November general election.

In 2018, she ran again for the 38th district against Acosta and won 51.2% to Acosta's 48.8%.

She chaired the Joint Legislative Committee on Emergency Management.

== California's 25th congressional district elections ==
=== 2020 special and general ===
On October 28, 2019, one day after Katie Hill announced her intent to resign from Congress, Smith announced her bid to fill Hill's vacated congressional seat. Hill endorsed Smith as her successor. Smith's State Assembly district covers more than half of the congressional district.

Smith picked up endorsements from the Los Angeles Times, Indivisible, and prominent Democratic figures such as House Speaker Nancy Pelosi, U.S. senators Dianne Feinstein and Kamala Harris, and Governor Gavin Newsom.

Smith's 11 opponents in the March 3, 2020, primary election included former U.S. Representative Steve Knight, progressive political commentator Cenk Uygur, and foreign policy adviser for Donald Trump's 2016 campaign George Papadopoulos. In December 2019, EMILY's List endorsed Smith, as did the Democratic Congressional Campaign Committee the following month.

Smith declined to attend a Democratic primary debate held on January 9, 2020, in Palmdale, California, citing her legislative duties in the State Assembly.

On March 3, 2020, a primary for the special election was held to fill the remainder of Hill's term at the same time that a primary election for the 117th United States Congress took place. Smith finished first in both elections. On May 12, 2020, a runoff was conducted to fill the remainder of Hill's term, which she lost to Republican Mike Garcia, a former U.S. Navy pilot. In the general election on November 3, 2020, she faced Garcia again, this time losing by 333 votes for the full two-year congressional term.

=== 2022 ===
In May 2021, Smith announced her intent to run a third time for what is now California's 27th congressional seat. In the November 8, 2022, election she lost again to Garcia.

== Personal life ==
Smith lives in Santa Clarita, California, with her husband, Phil, and their two daughters.

== Electoral history ==
=== California State Assembly ===
==== 2016 ====
2016 California State Assembly election, 38th district
Primary election
Party	Candidate	Votes	%
Democratic	Christy Smith	44,755	44.7
Republican	Dante Acosta	36,236	36.2
Republican	Tyler Izen	10,998	11.0
Republican	Jarrod R. Degonia	8,215	8.2
Total votes		100,204	100.0
General election
Republican	Dante Acosta	102,977	52.9
Democratic	Christy Smith	91,801	47.1
Total votes		194,778	100.0
Republican hold			

==== 2018 ====
2018 California State Assembly election, 38th district
Primary election
Party	Candidate	Votes	%
Republican	Dante Acosta (incumbent)	49,825	53.6
Democratic	Christy Smith	43,050	46.4
Total votes		92,875	100.0
General election
Democratic	Christy Smith	89,468	51.2
Republican	Dante Acosta (incumbent)	85,417	48.8
Democratic gain from Republican			

=== U.S. House of Representatives ===
==== 2020 special ====
2020 U.S. House of Representatives special election, California's 25th congressional district
Primary election
Party	Candidate	Votes	%
Democratic	Christy Smith	58,563	36.2
Republican	Mike Garcia	41,169	25.4
Republican	Steve Knight	27,799	17.2
Democratic	Cenk Uygur	10,609	6.6
Democratic	Aníbal Valdez-Ortega	7,368	4.6
Republican	Courtney Lackey	3,072	1.9
Democratic	Robert Cooper III	2,962	1.8
Republican	David Lozano	2,758	1.7
Republican	Daniel Mercuri	2,533	1.6
Republican	Kenneth Jenks	2,528	1.6
Democratic	Getro F. Elize	1,414	0.9
Democratic	David Rudnick	1,085	0.7
Total votes		161,860	100%
General election
Republican	Mike Garcia	95,088	54.9%
Democratic	Christy Smith	78,234	45.1%
Republican gain from Democratic			

==== 2020 general ====
2020 U.S. House of Representatives election, California's 25th congressional district
Primary election
Party	Candidate	Votes	%
Democratic	Christy Smith	49,679	31.7
Republican	Mike Garcia	37,381	23.9
Republican	Steve Knight	29,645	18.9
Democratic	Cenk Uygur	9,246	5.9
Democratic	Getro Franck Elize	6,317	4.0
Republican	David Lozano	6,272	4.0
Democratic	Anibal Valdéz-Ortega	4,920	3.1
Democratic	Robert Cooper III	4,474	2.9
Republican	George Papadopoulos	2,749	1.8
No party preference	Otis Lee Cooper	2,183	1.4
Democratic	Christopher C. Smith (withdrawn)	2,089	1.3
Republican	Daniel Mercuri	913	0.6
Republican	Kenneth Jenks	682	0.4
Total votes		156,550	100.0
General election
Republican	Mike Garcia (incumbent)	169,638	50.0
Democratic	Christy Smith	169,305	50.0
Total votes		338,943	100.0
Republican hold			

==== 2022 ====
2022 U.S. House of Representatives election, California's 27th congressional district
Primary election
Party	Candidate	Votes	%
Republican	Mike Garcia (incumbent)	57,469	47.1
Democratic	Christy Smith	45,675	37.4
Democratic	Quaye Quartey	8,303	6.8
Democratic	Ruth Luevanos	6,668	5.5
Republican	David Rudnick	2,648	2.2
Republican	Mark Pierce	1,352	1.1
Total votes		122,115	100.0
General election
Republican	Mike Garcia (incumbent)	104,536	53.2
Democratic	Christy Smith	91,782	46.8
Total votes		196,318	100.0
Republican hold			

California Assembly
Preceded by Dante Acosta	Member of the California State Assembly from the 38th district 2018–2020	Succeeded by Suzette Martinez Valladares
