= Cenk Uygur =

American political commentator and activist (born 1970)

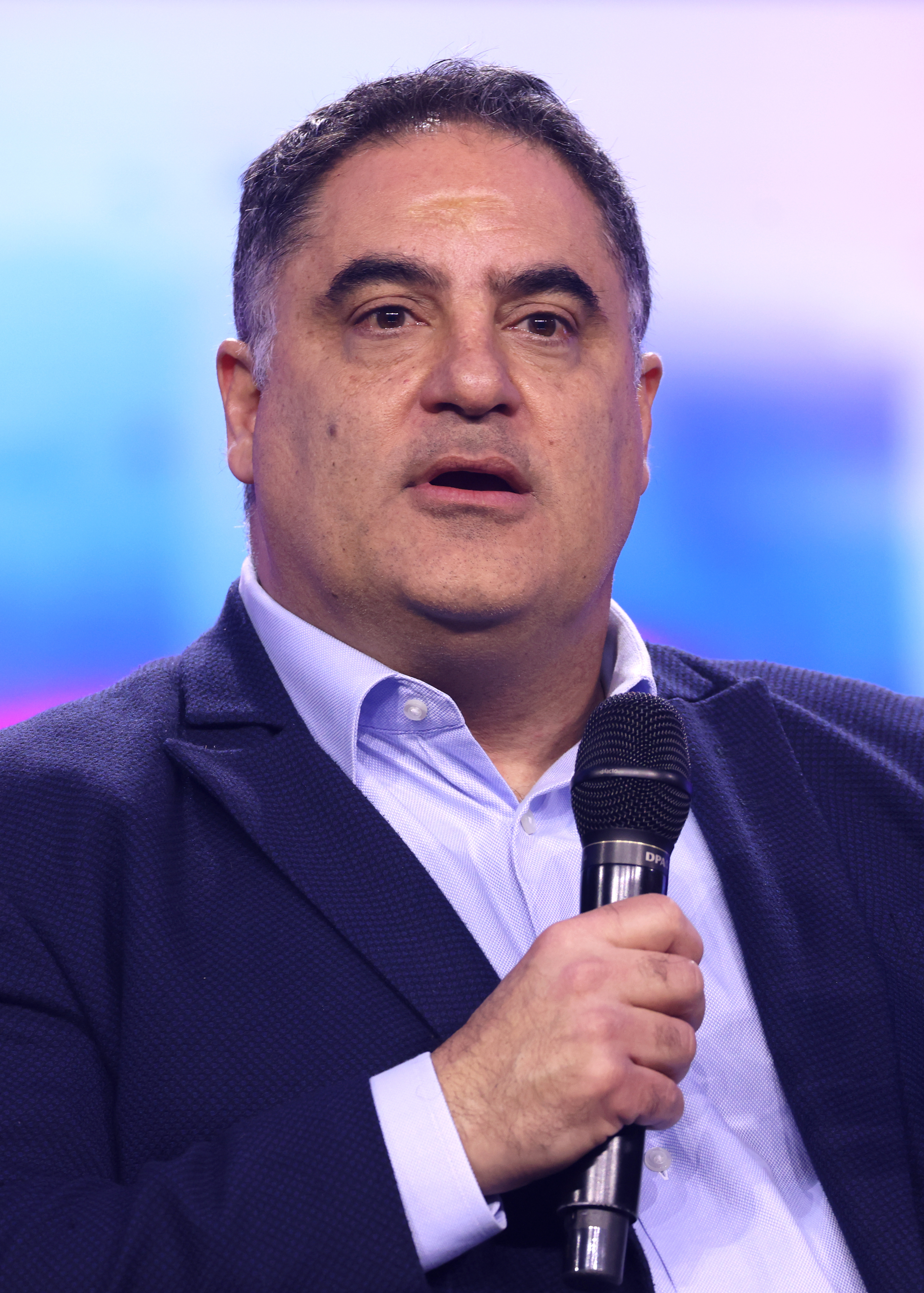
- Uygur speaking at AmericaFest 2024
- Born: Cenk Kadir Uygur; March 21, 1970 (age 56); Istanbul, Turkey
- Education: University of Pennsylvania (BS); Columbia University (JD)
- Occupations: Political commentator; activist; media host
- Years active: 1996–present
- Political party: Democratic (since 2007)
- Other political affiliations: Independent (2000–2007); Republican (until 2000)
- Spouse: Wendy Lang (m. 2008)
- Children: 2
- Relatives: Hasan Piker (nephew)
- Uygur's voice On the intersection of mainstream media and United States political corruption, 2012

Cenk Kadir Uygur (Note: English: /ˈdʒɛŋk kəˈdɪər ˈjuːɡər/ JENK kə-DEER YOO-gər, Turkish: [ˈdʒæɲc kaˈdiɾ ˈujɡuɾ].) (born March 21, 1970) is a Turkish-American left-wing political activist, commentator, and media host. He is the co-creator of The Young Turks, a progressive and a left-wing populist sociopolitical news and commentary program.

Born in Istanbul, Uygur moved to the US in 1978 and studied at the University of Pennsylvania and Columbia University. After a brief law practice in 1996, he hosted talk shows for WRKO, WWRC, and WAMI-TV before launching The Young Turks in 2002. Uygur briefly worked as a political commentator for MSNBC in 2011, and appeared on a weeknight commentary show on Current TV from 2011 to 2013. He founded the progressive political action committees Wolf-PAC, Justice Democrats, and Rebellion PAC.

In 2020, Uygur unsuccessfully ran as a Democrat in the special election and the regularly scheduled election for California's 25th congressional district on a platform that advocated for Medicare for All, the Green New Deal, and overturning Citizens United v. FEC. In October 2023, Uygur announced he would run in the 2024 Democratic Party presidential primaries to pressure then-president Joe Biden to withdraw from the election, despite not being a natural-born US citizen as constitutionally required; he suspended his campaign in March 2024.

Uygur is critical of the modern Democratic Party, which he accuses of elitism and straying from populist ideals. He has worked to move the party in a more social democratic or democratic socialist direction. Uygur advocates for campaign finance reform and is highly critical of US support for Israel. He has generated controversy for making offensive comments about women and minority groups, including LGBTQ people, religious Jews, and Muslims, and denying the Armenian genocide during his education; he has apologized for and retracted these remarks.

== Early life and education ==
Cenk Kadir Uygur was born in Istanbul to a wealthy Turkish family. His mother's maiden name was Yavaşça, and his father, Doğan, started life as a rural olive and grape farmer in Kilis, a city in southern Turkey near the Syrian border, later winning a scholarship to a technical university in Istanbul, becoming a mechanical engineer, and starting a company. The family emigrated to the United States when Cenk was eight years old, and there Doğan worked as a commercial real estate developer. He spent the remainder of his upbringing in East Brunswick, New Jersey, and graduated from East Brunswick High School. Uygur was raised in a secular Muslim household, but became more religious during college. He says that he then became agnostic, and is now a "stone-cold atheist", although he still identifies as a cultural Muslim.

Although a D in high school calculus almost kept Uygur out, he transferred into the undergraduate Wharton School of the University of Pennsylvania, where he majored in management and graduated in 1992. There, he wrote a school paper column in 1991 in which he criticized affirmative action for Black people and other minorities. He also criticized campus feminists for "making Anita Hill their patron saint" and made disparaging comments about women and said that the discussion about rape on campus was making men afraid.

Representing the Turkish Students Association on the university's Student Activities Council, Uygur argued against a $228 allocation to the Armenian Club in the council budget; council members overwhelmingly voted against him, and uncharacteristically applauded after his defeat was announced. In November 1991, he wrote an article in The Daily Pennsylvanian titled "Historical Fact or Falsehood?", in which he denied the Armenian genocide and asserted: "The claims of an Armenian genocide are not based on historical facts. If the history of the period is examined it becomes evident that in fact no such genocide took place." He has since recanted these statements and reversed his position. He received a Juris Doctor Law degree from Columbia Law School.

== Career ==
=== Early career ===
Uygur worked briefly in 1996 as an associate attorney. He practiced first at the law firm Drinker Biddle & Reath in Washington, D.C., and then at Hayes & Liebman in New York City.

He then worked in 1996 as a weekend/fill-in radio talk show host on WRKO in Boston, Massachusetts, and also that year in a similar position on WWRC in Washington, D.C. He bought time on a local access channel in Washington, D.C., where he made political commentary on his show called The Young Turk.

In 1999, he wrote for, produced, and appeared on a WAMI-TV news show, The Times in Miami, Florida. He then started The Young Turks (TYT) on Sirius Satellite Radio. That year, Uygur wrote on a blog post on the TYT website: "It seems like there is a sea of tits here, and I am drinking in tiny droplets. Obviously, the genes of women are flawed. They are poorly designed creatures who do not want to have sex nearly as often as needed for the human race to get along peaceably and fruitfully." He also wrote, in a letter to the editor in Salon, that talk of an Armenian genocide was simply propaganda. In the 2000s, Uygur maintained a weekly blog on The Huffington Post and wrote entries that were critical of the 2003 Iraq war.

=== The Young Turks ===
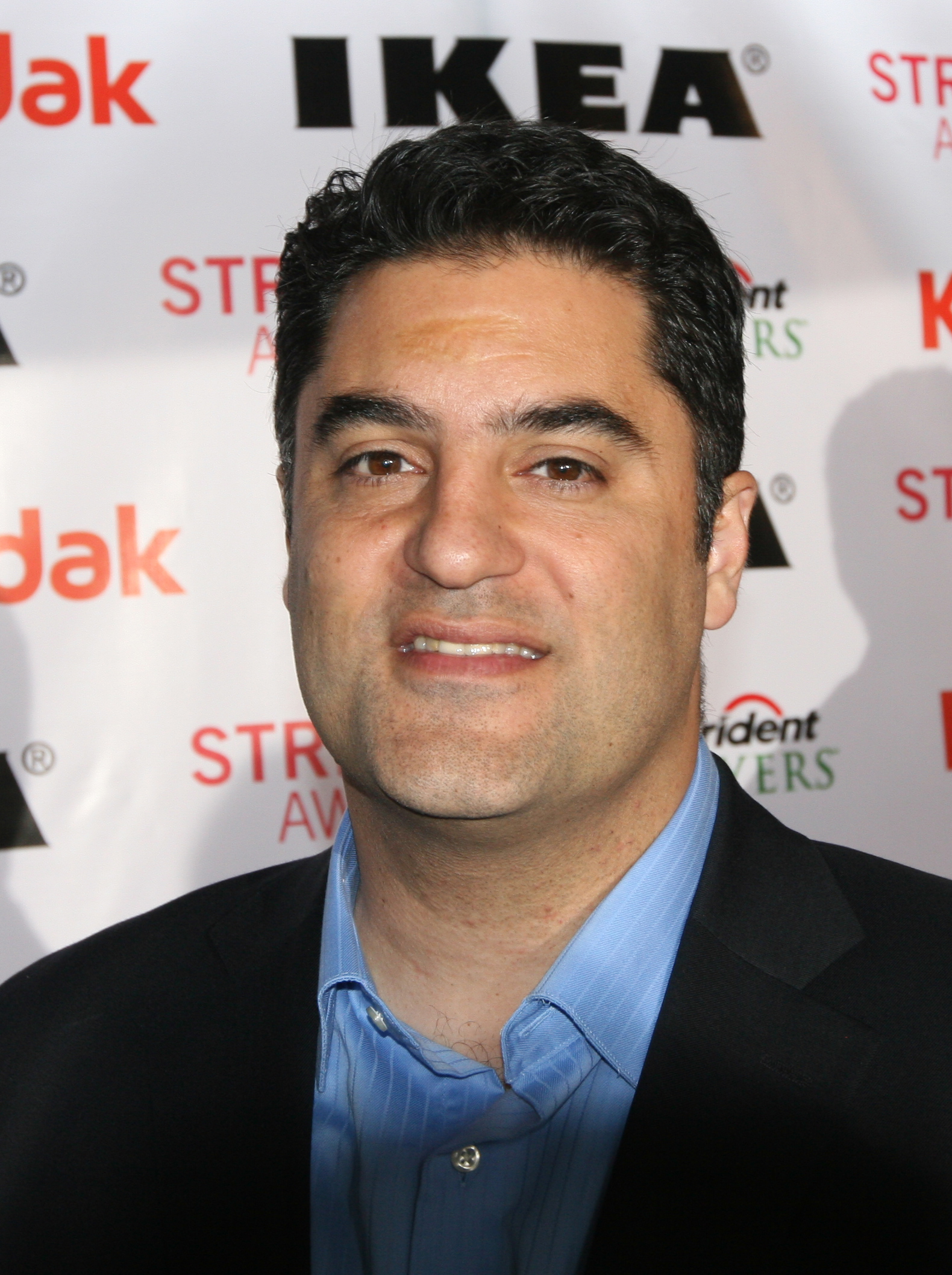
Uygur in 2010

Uygur created the left-wing, progressive talk show The Young Turks with the goal of starting a liberal-leaning political and entertainment show. It launched on the Sirius Satellite Radio network on February 14, 2002, and was also on the Air America radio network between 2006 and 2008. Uygur and his co-host Ana Kasparian applied a populist-left branding and programming strategy that made TYT a global online organization.

Armenian-Americans have criticized the show's name because the original Young Turks political movement in the Ottoman Empire was responsible for the Armenian genocide. Aram Hamparian, Executive Director of the Armenian National Committee of America, said of Uygur and the show's name:

Denying a genocide, belittling its survivors, and then naming your political show after its perpetrators should be troubling not only to Armenian Americans, but anyone concerned about human rights. Cenk Uygur... did just this ....

The Young Turks began a daily news video show on YouTube in 2005, and claims to have been the first on the streaming service. Uygur regularly says that The Young Turks is the largest online news show in the world, and has claimed so since at least 2011. It has amassed over 5 billion views on YouTube, and over 5 million subscribers, for a U.S. rank of #5,566. Leveraging the strength of The Young Turks talk show, Uygur expanded it into a network of channels and shows, beginning with Pop Trigger on July 5, 2007. Video of the show is streamed daily on its website, as well as on YouTube, YouTubeTV, via various streaming platforms, broadcast on a handful of local television channels throughout the U.S., and is a podcast.

In September 2011, when Uygur had been seeking a television platform for The Young Turks for years, a weeknight TV edition of the show was announced on fledgling Current TV, which had low ratings, at 7 p.m. EST (M–F) on the network beginning sometime in the fourth quarter of 2011. The show on Current TV began in December 2011, to low viewership, and ended on August 15, 2013, with the end of all live programming on Current TV.

In May 2018, The Young Turks launched its own TV-format 24-hour channel on YouTube TV, which includes both live and prerecorded programming.

Uygur hired his nephew, Hasan Piker, to work for the show.

=== MSNBC ===
MSNBC hired Uygur as a contributor and substitute anchor for the network on October 21, 2010. On January 21, 2011, Uygur was appointed as the host of the 6 p.m. Eastern slot on MSNBC as the anchor of a new prime time edition of MSNBC Live, resulting in a rearrangement of the time slots of MSNBC's other prime time shows. Uygur filled the time slot for six months, from January through June 2011.

Management saw the style of several hosts, including Uygur, as off-base from MSNBC's branding objectives, resulting in their demotion. According to Uygur, MSNBC President Phil Griffin disliked his "aggressive style" and told him the network's audience "require different manners of speaking". MSNBC denied that the network desired censorship of his anti-corporate stances, and both sides agreed that their main differences of opinion were about the style of communication. His contract ended when he was offered a weekend slot and declined. He was replaced by Al Sharpton, who by September had attracted 4% higher ratings. After leaving cable news, Uygur devoted his attention to TYT. Uygur over time became disillusioned with traditional media establishments.

=== Wolf-PAC ===
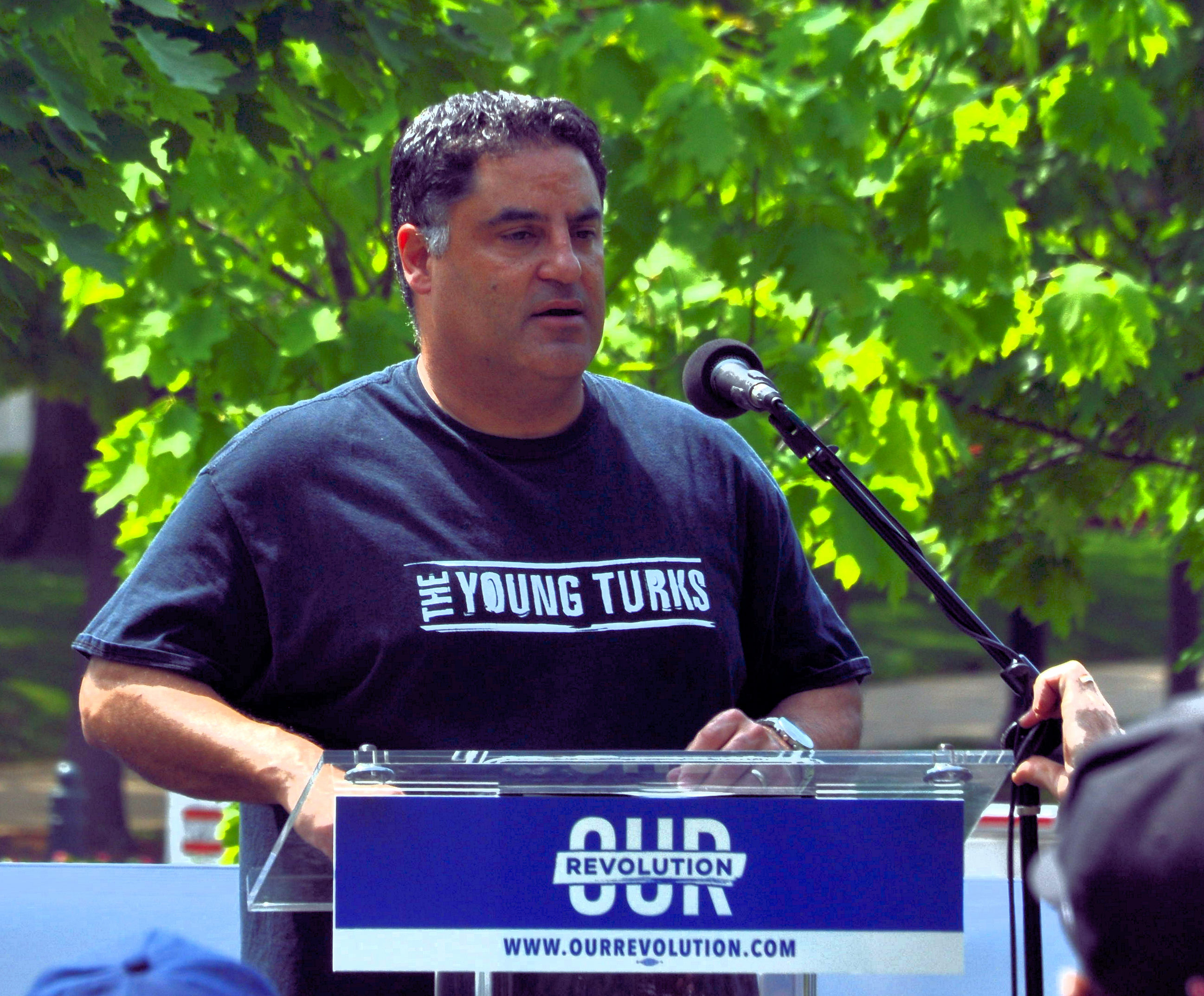
Uygur speaking at the People's Climate March in Washington, D.C., in April 2017

Several Supreme Court rulings (1976, 1978, 2010) on campaign finance motivated Uygur during the Occupy Wall Street movement to launch a long-term project, a political action committee named Wolf-PAC, on October 19, 2011, in New York City. Wolf-PAC aims to lobby state legislators to pass resolutions calling for a Convention of the States under Article V of the U.S. Constitution. Its slogan is "A super-PAC to end all super-PACs". The aim of the convention would be to pass an amendment to the United States Constitution that would end corporate personhood and publicly finance all elections in the United States. As of 2017, five states had passed a resolution calling for such a convention, though not all states used identical language in their convention call.

According to filings with the Federal Election Commission, during the 2016 and 2018 election cycles, Wolf-PAC devoted nearly 80% of its disbursements to salaries and administrative costs. Jonah Bennett quipped in The Daily Caller: "Cenk Uygur is so intent on keeping money out of politics his own PAC spends virtually all its donor money on personnel and operating expenses."

=== Justice Democrats ===
On January 23, 2017, Uygur co-founded the Justice Democrats along with Kyle Kulinski, a political commentator who had been affiliated with Uygur's Young Turks network. The group seeks to steer the Democratic Party in the strongly progressive, social democratic or democratic socialist direction espoused by U.S. senator Bernie Sanders. The group has supported progressive candidates in primaries against politicians whom they consider to be moderate and conservative Democrats, such as Joe Manchin, Joe Crowley, and Dianne Feinstein.

Uygur was forced out of the Justice Democrats on December 22, 2017, following the discovery of blog posts that he had written in the early 2000s in which he made statements that were described by Justice Democrats leadership as "sexist and racist". The next day, Uygur apologized and denounced his past statements in a video on The Young Turks channel on YouTube. In an interview with TheWrap, Uygur said he had deleted the "ugly" posts a decade ago, and added: "The stuff I wrote back then was really insensitive and ignorant. If you read that today, what I wrote 18 years ago, and you're offended by it, you're 100 percent right. And anyone who is subjected to that material, I apologize to. And I deeply regret having written that stuff when I was a different guy". Uygur said that he wrote the posts while he was still a conservative, before he underwent a political transformation and became a liberal; he asserted that he "had not yet matured" and "was still a conservative who thought that stuff was politically incorrect and edgy". Uygur added, "If someone said that today, I would heavily criticize them on the show and rightfully so, and I have. I've criticized myself over the years".

=== Rebellion PAC ===
In 2020, he co-founded Rebellion PAC, a political action committee with a focus on running advertisements in support of progressive electoral candidates, alongside Brianna Wu.

== Political campaigns ==
=== 2020 U.S. House of Representatives candidacy ===
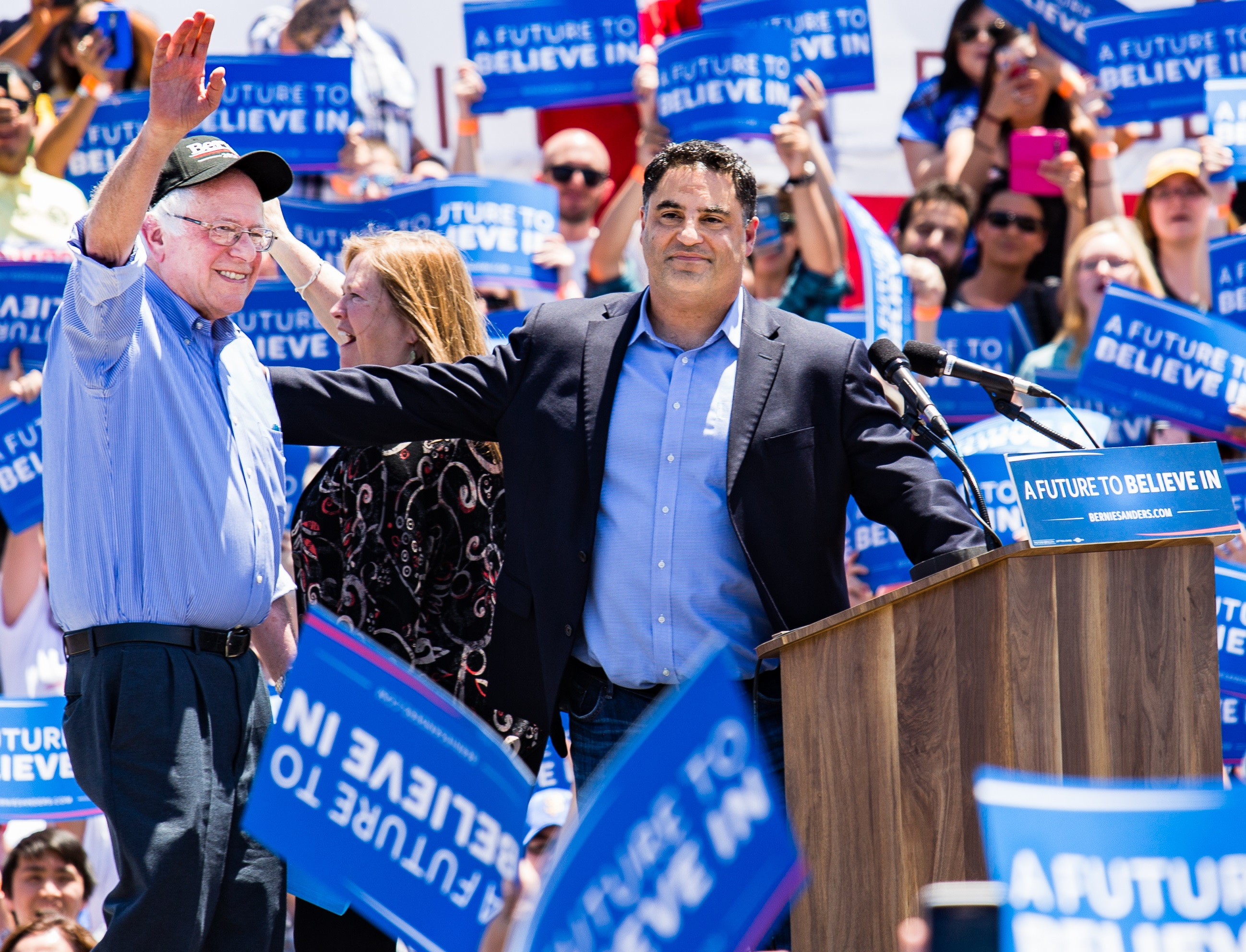
Uygur with Bernie Sanders at a campaign rally in California in 2016

In mid-November 2019, Uygur filed to run for Congress in California's 25th district, a seat recently vacated by the resignation of Katie Hill. He did this despite the fact that he did not live in the district. Other candidates included Democratic Assemblywoman Christy Smith and former Trump campaign aide George Papadopoulos. Uygur ran in two primary elections on March 3, 2020: the special election primary to fill the vacant seat through January 2021 and the Democratic primary for the next full term (decided in the 2020 November election). Uygur raised over $100,000 in small donations in the first three hours after announcing his candidacy. That figure rose to $796,000 in the remainder of the quarter.

Uygur positioned himself as left-wing, supporting single-payer healthcare, raising the minimum wage to $15 an hour, and overturning Citizens United v. FEC. In the wake of the 2019 Saugus High School shooting, he supported strict gun control laws. He criticized his Democratic opponent, Christy Smith, for her opposition to Medicare for All. Uygur's primary issue was to get money out of politics. He also opposed war with Iran and supported passing the Green New Deal.

Uygur's candidacy was initially endorsed by U.S. senator Bernie Sanders, then a leading candidate for the Democratic presidential nomination, on December 12, 2019. However, on December 13, 2019, Sanders retracted his support after offensive sexual comments that Uygur had long made about women, demeaning comments that he had made about Black people (using the N-word on his show multiple times), and provocative statements that he had made about fundamentalist Muslims and Jews in years prior were brought to his attention. The same day, Representative Ro Khanna (D-Calif.) withdrew his endorsement of Uygur, saying that Uygur's statements "were wrong and hurtful".

At least a dozen women's, LGBTQ, and Democratic organizations denounced comments he had made as sexist, racist, homophobic, anti-Islam, and antisemitic. Mark Gonzalez, the chairman of the Los Angeles County Democratic Party, said of him: "This man has spent decades, including up until recently, attacking women, the LGBTQ community, Jews, Muslims, Asian-Americans and African Americans. His vulgarity, his hate speech and divisive rhetoric have no place in our party." Will Rodriguez-Kennedy, the chairman of California Young Democrats, said "Cenk has a history of racist and homophobic and misogynistic comments that are inconsistent with the Democratic Party." Uygur claimed that there was a coordinated campaign against him by the media and political establishments.

Uygur ultimately lost both elections, receiving 6% and 7% of the vote, respectively. As no candidate earned 50 percent of the vote or more, the top two vote-earners, Christy Smith and navy officer Mike Garcia, advanced to the runoff, with Garcia eventually winning the election.

=== 2024 presidential campaign ===
Cenk Uygur
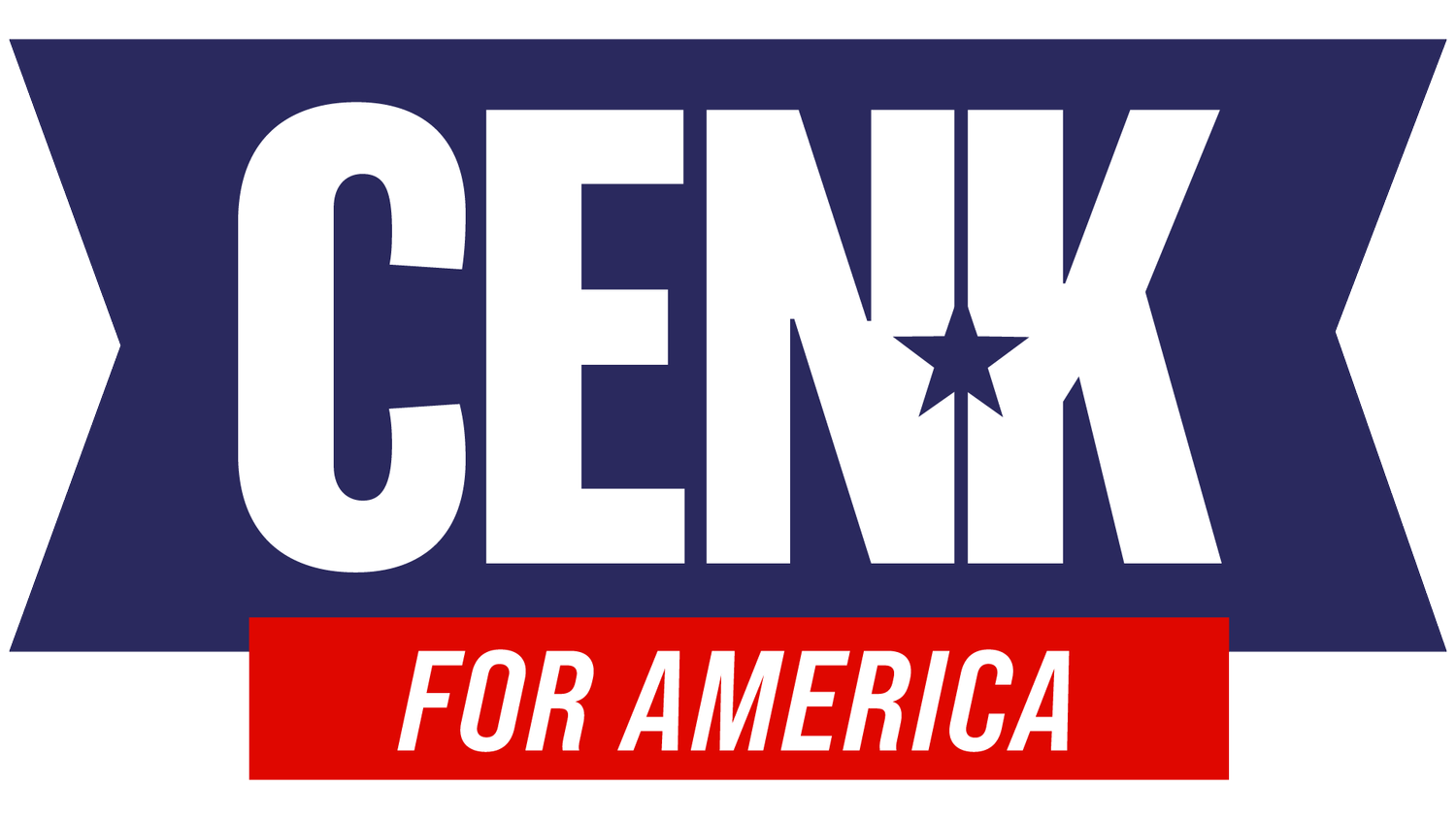
- Campaign: 2024 United States presidential election (Democratic Party primaries)
- Candidate: Cenk Uygur
- Status: Suspended
- Announced: October 11, 2023
- Suspended: March 6, 2024

Uygur said that he would run for president of the United States despite being constitutionally ineligible for the position. Consequently, he failed in his efforts to be listed on a number of state primary ballots.

In September 2023, Uygur said that he was preparing to launch a potential challenge to President Joe Biden in the 2024 Democratic Party presidential primaries. Asserting that Biden was too old and would be unable to defeat Trump, Uygur encouraged Biden not to seek re-election. Uygur said that, if no progressive challenger announced a campaign, he would start his own campaign to attempt to encourage other Democrats to challenge Biden.

Uygur did not meet the Constitution's requirements to be elected to the presidency. Article II, Section 1 of the U.S. Constitution requires the president to be a "natural-born U.S. citizen." Uygur, having become a citizen after his birth, is a naturalized U.S. citizen, not a natural-born U.S. citizen. Uygur nonetheless claimed that he had a "slam dunk" legal case, citing a 2006 UIC law review paper by a law school graduate on a 1964 case entitled Schneider v. Rusk.

On October 11, Uygur officially announced his presidential campaign. He filed for the Nevada ballot that same day, but was not allowed on it after he submitted an altered form. Similarly, Uygur's New Hampshire ballot application was denied by Secretary of State David Scanlan on October 18; Uygur said that he would sue, but did not say where. Uygur appealed the New Hampshire decision to the state's Ballot Law Commission, which unanimously rejected his appeal on November 2, noting that, due to the natural-born citizen clause, New Hampshire state laws requiring all presidential candidates to affirm that they are natural-born citizens are constitutional." Similarly, Uygur's application for the South Carolina Democratic Party presidential primary ballot was not certified because he did not meet constitutional requirements to hold the office of president of the United States. Uygur unsuccessfully sued the South Carolina Election Commission and the South Carolina Democratic Party over his exclusion from the ballot. After Uygur had submitted his paperwork to Arkansas and the Arkansas Democratic Party, the state's election officials denied him ballot access on December 4. On December 18, 2023, Uygur's campaign issued a press release indicating that he was on primary ballots for the following states: Minnesota, Oklahoma, Texas, and Vermont. It was confirmed in January that Uygur was placed on the ballot in Connecticut.

Uygur indicated to The Hill in late November 2023 that his campaign had raised more than $250,000.

On March 6, 2024, Uygur ended his presidential campaign.

== Political views ==
=== Ideology ===
Once a Republican, Uygur says that he has "enormous disdain for the Republican Party." At the same time, he said of Barack Obama: "He's conservative in his bones, so I've got no love for Obama whatsoever." Uygur is critical of the New Democrats wing of the Democratic Party, which he regards as the incumbent political establishment. He has called for the Democratic Party to undergo a revitalization process.

Uygur slowly transitioned away from the Republican Party and conservative politics. He has cited the decision to invade Iraq as a "seminal moment" in that transition.

=== Campaign finance ===
Uygur has supported the removal of corporate donations from the political system, and he said that "campaign finance reform" is the "only one issue" in the United States. He is known for criticizing both Democratic and Republican politicians, accusing many of them for being influenced by donors.

=== Israel and antisemitism ===
In 2015, Uygur hosted ex-Ku Klux Klan leader and white supremacist neo-Nazi David Duke on the show in an antisemitic segment about "how Jews control everything." Cenk stated on the Lex Fridman show in 2024 he was arguing against David Duke's views. In 2019, he tweeted that Evangelical Christians harbored the worst antisemitism in the world.

Uygur is highly critical of Israel. During the Gaza War (2008–2009), he criticized Israeli actions in Gaza, particularly an Israeli strike on a UN school that killed 30 Palestinian civilians. In 2011, he criticized the Israel Defense Forces for the 2010 Gaza Freedom Flotilla, which resulted in the IDF killing multiple civilians.

He has strongly opposed the Gaza war, repeatedly citing the high number of civilian deaths and has accused Israel of committing a genocide against the Palestinians. He has also expressed opposition to Hamas and condemned the October 7 attacks. Uygur has supported the implementation of a two-state solution with the 1967 borders.

=== Presidential elections ===
In 2000, Uygur voted for John McCain in the Republican primaries; however, he did not vote for McCain in the 2008 United States presidential election due to his perceived proximity to the Christian right and his views on taxes and waterboarding. Uygur supported the presidential campaigns of Bernie Sanders in 2016 and 2020.

He ultimately ended up supporting Kamala Harris over Donald Trump in the 2024 United States presidential election. However after 2024 election, Uygur has expressed disdain with the Democratic Party, believing that they have strayed from populist ideals and become more elitist than the Republican Party, specifically citing Elon Musk's reception to criticism.

== Awards ==
In 2010, along with Ayaan Hirsi Ali, Uygur accepted the "Emperor Has No Clothes Award" from the Freedom From Religion Foundation and later the Humanist Media Award from the American Humanist Association.

== Controversies ==
=== Comments about women ===
In the early 2000s, Uygur posted a series of blog posts that were described as sexist. One post said, "I had one of the best nights of my life at Mardi Gras. I kissed over 23 different women, saw and felt countless breasts, and was in a wonderful drunken stupor thanks to my friend John Daniels." Another post said, "It seems like there is a sea of tits here, and I am drinking in tiny droplets. I want to dive into the whole god damn ocean." Uygur would delete and later apologize for his comments.

In a 2011 episode of The Young Turks, Uygur and his cohost Ana Kasparian dismissed actress Olivia Munn's sexual harassment allegations against director Brett Ratner, and Uygur defended Ratner bragging about having sex with Munn, saying that she likely "drove him crazy". Uygur would later apologize for his comments. In one episode in 2013, Uygur ranked women on a scale of 1-to-10 on how likely men would be to let them perform oral sex on them. That same year, Uygur said a model looked "like she'd just come out of a [concentration] camp."

In 2013, Uygur made lewd remarks about women's physical appearances in Miami, saying "the women on this island are outrageously, almost unacceptably, hot". In 2017, an unnamed TYT employee told TheWrap that Uygur spoke inappropriately about women.

In 2016, Uygur defended the Harvard University men's soccer team for ranking the sexual appeal of female students on a scale of 1-to-10 on a widely shared "scouting report", including explicit descriptions of potential sex acts with the women. Uygur defended his comments, telling The Los Angeles Times that he should not be criticized for having "frank conversations about sex".

=== Armenian Genocide denialism and TYT name controversy ===
The show's name Young Turks has been criticized and called for change due to the original Young Turks political movement in the Ottoman Empire being responsible for committing the Armenian genocide, the Assyrian genocide, and the Greek genocide. Alex Galitsky, who works for the Armenian National Committee of America, stated "If a group decided to call themselves 'the Young Nazis', and pitched themselves as a disruptor or anti-establishment news outlet, people would be rightly outraged".

In 1991, Cenk Uygur wrote an article in The Daily Pennsylvanian, the student newspaper of the University of Pennsylvania, in which he promoted Armenian genocide denial. In 2016, Cenk Uygur posted a statement on TYT's website in which he rescinded his Armenian Genocide denial statements, arguing: "My mistake at the time was confusing myself for a scholar of history, which I most certainly am not. I don't want to make the same mistake again, so I am going to refrain from commenting on the topic of the Armenian Genocide, which I do not know nearly enough about." In response to the criticism he has explained that the name of the show was chosen because it is a popular colloquialism traditionally meaning a young radical who fights the status quo.

=== Response to unionization of TYT staff ===
In February 2020, when the International Alliance of Theatrical Stage Employees sought to unionize The Young Turks, Uygur controversially urged his employees not to do so. Uygur allegedly fired employee Jacorey Palmer for his pro-union activities, and, according to an anonymous TYT employee, Uygur allegedly withheld bonuses and increases from employees who were involved in the union drive. Uygur denied the charges. Uygur's position toward the union was criticized as hypocritical by The New Republic due to his claims of support for unions and progressive causes.

=== Bar on entering the United Kingdom ===
In 2026, Uygur and his nephew Hasan Piker were banned from entering the United Kingdom because "their presence in the U.K. may not be conducive to the public good". The Times alleged that Shabana Mahmood banned Uygur and Piker from the UK due to fears they could fuel antisemitism. Uygur said he had been banned for criticising Israel. Piker said the banning was "at the behest of Israel" and accused western governments of "betraying 'liberal values' for a genocidal fascist foreign government". Before the Home Office intervened, they were to speak at the SXSW London festival and the Oxford Union.

== Electoral history ==
2020 California's 25th congressional district special election
Party	Candidate	Votes	%
	Christy Smith	58,563	36.2%
	Mike Garcia	41,169	25.4%
	Steve Knight	27,799	17.2%
	Cenk Uygur	10,609	6.6%
	Aníbal Valdez-Ortega	7,368	4.6%
	Courtney Lackey	3,072	1.9%
	Robert Cooper III	2,962	1.8%
	David Lozano	2,758	1.7%
	Daniel Mercuri	2,533	1.6%
	Kenneth Jenks	2,528	1.6%
	Getro F. Elize	1,414	0.9%
	David Rudnick	1,085	0.7%
Total votes		161,860	100%

2020 California's 25th congressional district election
Primary election
Party	Candidate	Votes	%
	Christy Smith	49,679	31.7%
	Mike Garcia	37,381	23.9%
	Steve Knight	29,645	18.9%
	Cenk Uygur	9,246	5.9%
	Getro Franck Elize	6,317	4.0%
	David Lozano	6,272	4.0%
	Anibal Valdéz-Ortega	4,920	3.1%
	Robert Cooper III	4,474	2.9%
	George Papadopoulos	2,749	1.8%
	Otis Lee Cooper	2,183	1.4%
	Christopher C. Smith (withdrawn)	2,089	1.3%
	Daniel Mercuri	913	0.6%
	Kenneth Jenks	682	0.4%
Total votes		156,550	100.0%

== Personal life ==
Uygur is Turkish-American and is fluent both in Turkish, his native language, and in English. In 2008, he married Wendy Lang, a marriage and family therapist. Uygur's sister is Ülker Sedef Piker, an architectural historian.

== See also ==
- List of Turkish Americans

== Notes ==
Media offices
Preceded by Keith Olbermann	Chief News Officer of Current TV; 2012–2013	Position abolished
