= 2024 Oklahoma Democratic presidential primary =

- March 5, 2024

41 delegates (36 pledged, 5 unpledged) to the Democratic National Convention

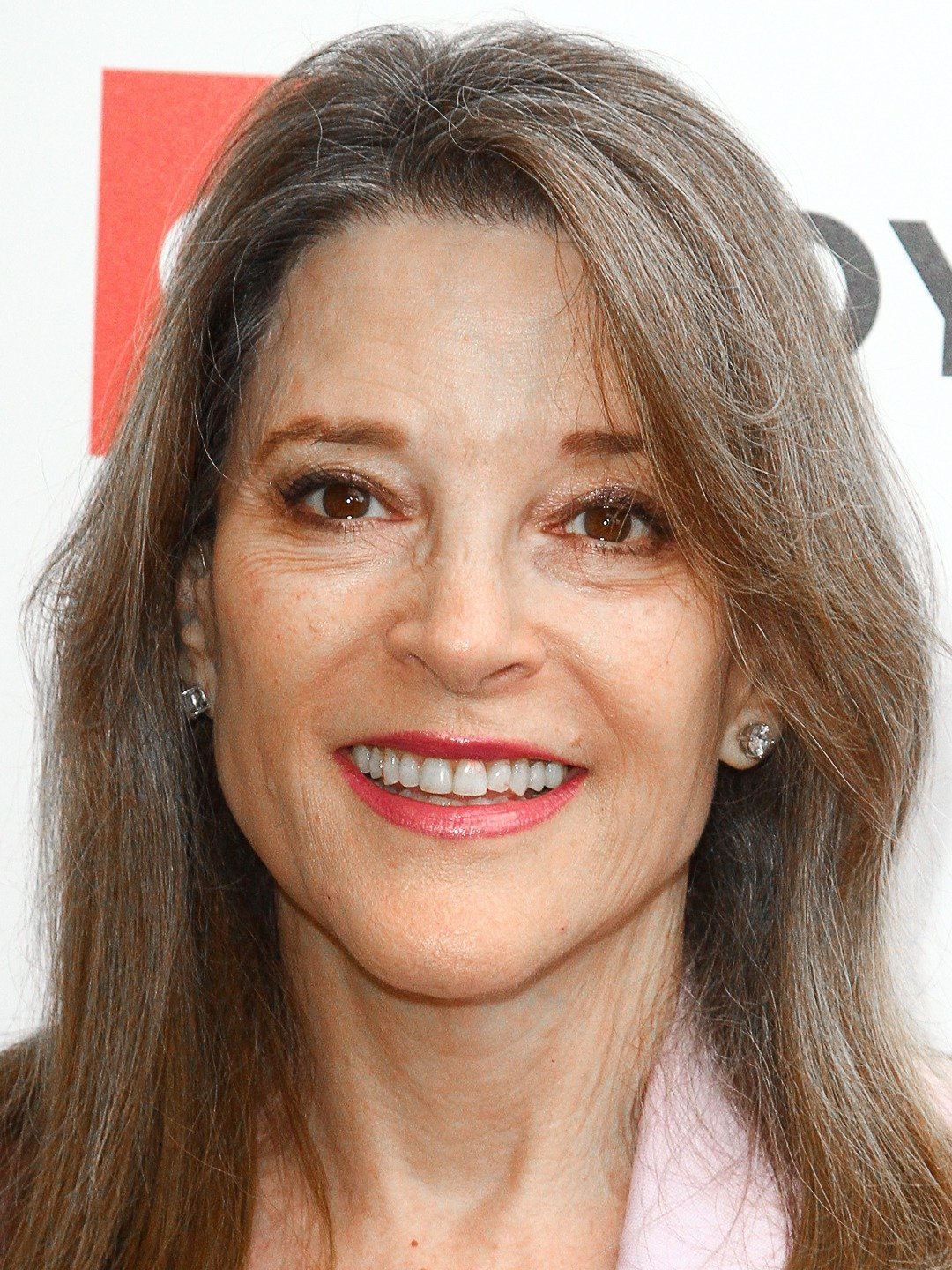

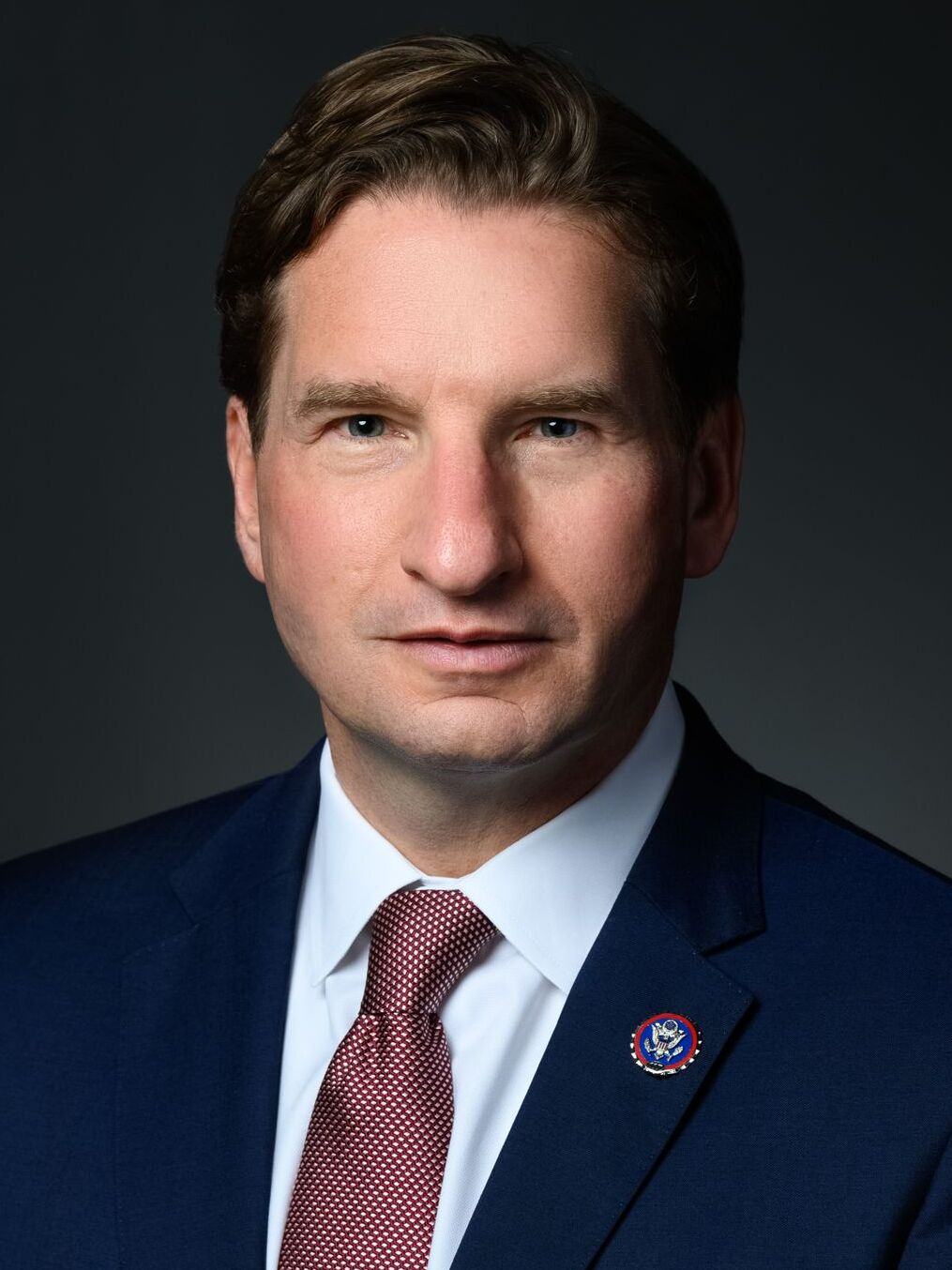
Candidate	Joe Biden	Marianne Williamson	Dean Phillips
Home state	Delaware	Washington, D.C.	Minnesota
Delegate count	36	0	0
Popular vote	66,882	8,356	8,182
Percentage	73.0%	9.1%	8.9%

Biden
20–30%
30–40%
40–50%
50–60%
60–70%
70–80%
80–90%
90–100%
Lyons
30–40%
40–50%
50–60%
60–70%
90–100%
Perez-Serrato
90–100%
Phillips
20–30%
30–40%
40–50%
50–60%
60–70%
70–80%
80–90%
90–100%
Williamson
20–30%
30–40%
40–50%
60–70%
90–100%
Tie
20–30%
30–40%
40–50%
50%

The 2024 Oklahoma Democratic presidential primary took place on March 5, 2024, as part of the Democratic Party primaries for the 2024 presidential election. 36 delegates to the Democratic National Convention were allocated, with 5 additional unpledged delegates. The semi-closed primary was held on Super Tuesday alongside primaries in 14 other states and territories.

Joe Biden largely won the state with all delegates, though with significant opposition from author Marianne Williamson and US representative Dean Phillips. Philips received a plurality in Cimarron County, making it one of only two counties he won in his campaign. (Note: Philips tied with Biden in Clark County, Missouri, but Cimarron County and Logan County, Nebraska remain his only outright victories.)

== Candidates ==
The following candidates filed to be placed on the ballot in Oklahoma:

- Joe Biden
- Stephen Lyons
- Armando “Mando” Perez-Serrato
- Dean Phillips
- Cenk Uygur (Note: Uygur does not meet the constitutional requirements to be President of the United States.)
- Marianne Williamson

== Results ==
2024 Oklahoma Democratic pres. primary
Candidate	Votes	%	Delegates
Joe Biden (incumbent)	66,882	72.98	36
Marianne Williamson	8,356	9.12	0
Dean Phillips	8,182	8.93	0
Stephen Lyons	4,441	4.85	0
Cenk Uygur	1,974	2.15	0
Armando Perez-Serrato	1,809	1.97	0
Total	91,644	100%	36

=== Results by County ===
2024 Oklahoma Democratic primary (results per county)
County	Joe Biden		Marianne Williamson		Dean Phillips		All Other Candidates (Note: Combined votes of Stephen Lyons, Cenk Uygur, and Armando "Mando" Perez-Serrato)		Total votes cast
County	Votes	%	Votes	%	Votes	%	Votes	%	Total votes cast
Adair	195	53.28%	44	12.02%	76	20.77%	51	13.93%	366
Alfalfa	41	50.62%	5	6.17%	19	23.46%	16	19.75%	81
Atoka	131	52.61%	24	9.64%	50	20.08%	44	17.67%	249
Beaver	25	54.35%	5	10.87%	8	17.39%	8	17.39%	46
Beckham	155	57.62%	36	13.38%	44	16.36%	34	12.64%	269
Blaine	85	46.20%	20	10.87%	42	22.83%	37	20.11%	184
Bryan	413	61.46%	77	11.46%	92	13.69%	90	13.39%	672
Caddo	269	51.14%	75	14.26%	87	16.54%	95	18.06%	526
Canadian	2,491	72.41%	377	10.96%	305	8.87%	267	7.76%	3,440
Carter	490	61.87%	89	11.24%	113	14.27%	100	12.63%	792
Cherokee	902	68.70%	126	9.60%	139	10.59%	146	11.12%	1,313
Choctaw	141	51.65%	32	11.72%	41	15.02%	59	21.61%	273
Cimarron	6	25.00%	1	4.17%	11	45.83%	6	25.00%	24
Cleveland	8,488	78.71%	972	9.01%	615	5.70%	709	6.57%	10,784
Coal	46	33.33%	23	16.67%	43	31.16%	26	18.84%	138
Comanche	1,524	75.67%	181	8.99%	155	7.70%	154	7.65%	2,014
Cotton	51	51.52%	12	12.12%	14	14.14%	22	22.22%	99
Craig	195	53.13%	43	11.72%	49	13.35%	80	21.80%	367
Creek	890	68.83%	131	10.13%	126	9.74%	146	11.29%	1,293
Custer	251	68.02%	36	9.76%	39	10.57%	43	11.65%	369
Delaware	536	67.59%	63	7.94%	95	11.98%	99	12.48%	793
Dewey	50	41.32%	15	12.40%	37	30.58%	19	15.70%	121
Ellis	46	66.67%	3	4.35%	13	18.84%	7	10.14%	69
Garfield	632	72.06%	83	9.46%	75	8.55%	87	9.92%	877
Garvin	280	55.89%	56	11.18%	77	15.37%	88	17.56%	501
Grady	557	62.44%	92	10.31%	106	11.88%	137	15.36%	892
Grant	48	61.54%	7	8.97%	13	16.67%	10	12.82%	78
Greer	53	53.54%	14	14.14%	14	14.14%	18	18.18%	99
Harmon	21	45.65%	7	15.22%	11	23.91%	7	15.22%	46
Harper	37	66.07%	8	14.29%	7	12.50%	4	7.14%	56
Haskell	149	55.81%	19	7.12%	41	15.36%	58	21.72%	267
Hughes	133	50.00%	21	7.89%	61	22.93%	51	19.17%	266
Jackson	163	65.20%	27	10.80%	22	8.80%	38	15.20%	250
Jefferson	71	51.08%	17	12.23%	24	17.27%	27	19.42%	139
Johnston	104	43.33%	34	14.17%	53	22.08%	49	20.42%	240
Kay	518	68.70%	84	11.14%	72	9.55%	80	10.61%	754
Kingfisher	108	54.27%	22	11.06%	34	17.09%	35	17.59%	199
Kiowa	131	61.50%	21	9.86%	30	14.08%	31	14.55%	213
Latimer	159	48.92%	29	8.92%	56	17.23%	81	24.92%	325
Le Flore	539	56.09%	103	10.72%	163	16.96%	156	16.23%	961
Lincoln	381	59.07%	61	9.46%	98	15.19%	105	16.28%	645
Logan	761	72.61%	107	10.21%	93	8.87%	87	8.30%	1,048
Love	98	55.68%	24	13.64%	33	18.75%	21	11.93%	176
Major	69	59.48%	16	13.79%	17	14.66%	14	12.07%	116
Marshall	126	56.00%	20	8.89%	37	16.44%	42	18.67%	225
Mayes	548	63.35%	69	7.98%	119	13.76%	129	14.91%	865
McClain	442	64.24%	69	10.03%	80	11.63%	97	14.10%	688
McCurtain	240	54.05%	29	6.53%	77	17.34%	98	22.07%	444
McIntosh	409	51.00%	109	13.59%	153	19.08%	131	16.33%	802
Murray	198	48.41%	64	15.65%	67	16.38%	80	19.56%	409
Muskogee	1,069	67.79%	148	9.38%	173	10.97%	187	11.86%	1,577
Noble	144	60.50%	28	11.76%	40	16.81%	26	10.92%	238
Nowata	120	53.10%	25	11.06%	50	22.12%	31	13.72%	226
Okfuskee	146	60.83%	22	9.17%	38	15.83%	34	14.17%	240
Oklahoma	16,876	82.12%	1,580	7.69%	1,050	5.11%	1,044	5.08%	20,550
Okmulgee	695	69.57%	89	8.91%	89	8.91%	126	12.61%	999
Osage	991	74.18%	135	10.10%	103	7.71%	107	8.01%	1,336
Ottawa	392	64.26%	71	11.64%	69	11.31%	78	12.79%	610
Pawnee	209	66.99%	24	7.69%	39	12.50%	40	12.82%	312
Payne	1,292	77.04%	164	9.78%	116	6.92%	105	6.26%	1,677
Pittsburg	628	57.56%	121	11.09%	160	14.67%	182	16.68%	1,091
Pontotoc	464	61.38%	89	11.77%	97	12.83%	106	14.02%	756
Pottawatomie	1,024	71.01%	154	10.68%	147	10.19%	117	8.11%	1,442
Pushmataha	105	51.22%	19	9.27%	49	23.90%	32	15.61%	205
Roger Mills	27	37.50%	10	13.89%	26	36.11%	9	12.50%	72
Rogers	1,451	74.11%	163	8.32%	223	11.39%	121	6.18%	1,958
Seminole	241	58.21%	58	14.01%	45	10.87%	70	16.91%	414
Sequoyah	466	58.47%	83	10.41%	121	15.18%	127	15.93%	797
Stephens	383	62.99%	49	8.06%	101	16.61%	75	12.34%	608
Texas	76	48.41%	16	10.19%	33	21.02%	32	20.38%	157
Tillman	59	59.00%	6	6.00%	14	14.00%	21	21.00%	100
Tulsa	12,654	80.64%	1,198	7.63%	954	6.08%	886	5.65%	15,692
Wagoner	1,916	63.82%	345	11.49%	355	11.83%	386	12.86%	3,002
Washington	727	74.79%	80	8.23%	89	9.16%	76	7.82%	972
Washita	88	35.92%	33	13.47%	76	31.02%	48	19.59%	245
Woods	97	68.79%	11	7.80%	20	14.18%	13	9.22%	141
Woodward	146	53.48%	33	12.09%	59	21.61%	35	12.82%	273
Total	66,882	72.98%	8,356	9.12%	8,182	8.93%	8,224 (Note: The combined votes of Lyons, Serrato, and Uygur actually outnumber the number of votes Dean Phillips got, but it is still placed behind him due to the "All Other Candidates" numbers being split.)	8.97%	91,644

== Analysis ==
There was significant protest voting against Biden in rural counties. These voters are likely Democrats In Name Only who tend to vote Republican in most elections, but remain registered as Democrats. Biden carried the state by a strong margin but would lose Cimarron County to Dean Phillips, who received a plurality of the county's vote.

== See also ==
- 2024 Oklahoma Republican presidential primary
- 2024 Democratic Party presidential primaries
- 2024 United States presidential election
- 2024 United States presidential election in Oklahoma
- 2024 United States elections
