= Statewide opinion polling for the 2024 Republican Party presidential primaries =

This is a list of statewide public opinion polls that have been conducted relating to the Republican primaries for the 2024 United States presidential election. The persons named in the polls are declared candidates or have received media speculation about their possible candidacy.

== Background ==
The Republican National Committee determined that candidates must qualify for the first primary debate by polling above 1% in three national polls since July 2023 – or in two national polls and one poll from two different early primary states (of which the polls must meet committee standards) – as well as attract donations from at least 40,000 individuals, with at least 200 from each of 20 states or territories.

Each subsequent debate raised the polling threshold for qualification. For the second debate, candidates needed to poll above 3% in August or September in two national polls; otherwise, one national poll plus two state polls in two separate early primary states also qualify. The donor threshold was also raised for the second debate to 50,000 individuals. For the third and fourth debates, the threshold was raised to above 4% in one national poll and one early primary state poll, as well as 70,000 unique donors.

Individuals who have been included in statewide Republican primary polls but have either ruled out their candidacy or not expressed interest in running include Greg Abbott, Tucker Carlson, Liz Cheney, Tom Cotton, Ted Cruz, Josh Hawley, Kristi Noem, Mike Pompeo, Mitt Romney, Marco Rubio, Rick Scott, Chris Sununu, Donald Trump Jr., Ivanka Trump, and Glenn Youngkin.

== Primary and caucus calendar ==
2024 Republican Party primaries and caucuses
Date	Delegates		Primaries/caucuses
January 15	40		Iowa caucus
January 23	22		New Hampshire primary
February 6	-		Nevada primary (Note: The state-organized primary will be boycotted by the Nevada Republican Party and its results ignored in favor of the party-organized caucus two days later.)
February 8	35	26; 9	Nevada caucus Virgin Islands caucus
February 24	50		South Carolina primary
February 27	55		Michigan primary
March 2	86	32; 54	Idaho caucus Missouri caucus
March 3	19		District of Columbia primary
March 4	29		North Dakota caucus
March 5 (Super Tuesday)	874	49; 28; 9; 40; 169; 37; 20; 40; 39; 75; 43; 58; 162; 40; 17; 48	Alabama primary Alaska primary American Samoa caucus Arkansas primary California primary Colorado primary Maine primary Massachusetts primary Minnesota primary North Carolina primary Oklahoma primary Tennessee primary Texas primary Utah primary Vermont primary Virginia primary
March 9	9		Guam caucus
March 10	32	9; 23	Northern Marianas caucus Puerto Rico primary
March 12	160	59; 19; 39; 43	Georgia primary Hawaii caucus Mississippi primary Washington primary
March 19	349	43; 125; 64; 39; 78	Arizona primary Florida primary Illinois primary Kansas primary Ohio primary
March 23	46		Louisiana primary
April 2	195	28; 16; 91; 19; 41	Connecticut primary Delaware primary New York primary Rhode Island primary Wisconsin primary
April 18–20	29		Wyoming caucus
April 23	67		Pennsylvania primary
May 7	58		Indiana primary
May 14	104	37; 36; 31	Maryland primary Nebraska primary West Virginia primary
May 21	77	46; 31	Kentucky caucus Oregon primary
June 4	131	31; 49; 22; 29	Montana primary New Jersey primary New Mexico primary South Dakota primary

== Aggregate polling summary ==
270toWin

States polled	Dates administered	Dates updated	Ron DeSantis	Nikki Haley	Donald Trump	Other/ Undecided (Note: Calculated by taking the difference of 100% and all other candidates combined.)	Margin
Iowa	January 11 – 15, 2024	January 15, 2024	15.7%	18.5%	52.5%	13.3% (Note: Vivek Ramaswamy 6.8% Chris Christie 3.0% Ryan Binkley 1.5% Asa Hutchinson 0.8%)	Trump +34.0
Massachusetts	February 7–8, 2024	February 15, 2024	–	29.3%	63.0%	7.7%	Trump +33.7
New Hampshire	January 22–23, 2024	January 23, 2024	7.3%	35.7%	56.5%	0.5%	Trump +20.8
South Carolina	February 16–20, 2024	February 21, 2024	–	34.6%	61.6%	3.8%	Trump +27.0
Wisconsin	February 7, 2024	February 15, 2024	–	22.5%	71.5%	6.0%	Trump +49.0

FiveThirtyEight

States polled	Dates administered	Dates updated	Nikki Haley	Donald Trump	Other/ Undecided (Note: Calculated by taking the difference of 100% and all other candidates combined.)	Margin
Arizona	through February 4, 2024	February 15, 2024	21.0%	76.9%	2.1%	Trump +55.9
California	through February 4, 2024	February 10, 2024	18.9%	76.7%	4.4%	Trump +57.8
Florida	through February 4, 2024	February 10, 2024	14.1%	84.2%	1.7%	Trump +70.1
Georgia	through February 4, 2024	February 10, 2024	18.1%	79.0%	2.9%	Trump +60.9
Iowa	through January 14, 2024	January 15, 2024	18.7%	52.7%	28.6% (Note: Ron DeSantis 15.8% Vivek Ramaswamy 6.4% Asa Hutchinson 0.7%)	Trump +34.0
Massachusetts	through March 3, 2024	March 4, 2024	29.3%	66.6%	4.1%	Trump +37.3
Michigan	through February 24, 2024	February 25, 2024	21.8%	78.7%	–	Trump +56.9
New Hampshire	through January 22, 2024	January 23, 2024	36.3%	53.9%	9.8%	Trump +17.6
North Carolina	through February 4, 2024	February 15, 2024	22.1%	74.7%	4.2%	Trump +52.6
Ohio	through February 4, 2024	February 10, 2024	16.9%	81.9%	1.2%	Trump +56.4
Pennsylvania	through February 4, 2024	February 10, 2024	17.8%	78.5%	3.7%	Trump +51.3
South Carolina	through February 23, 2024	February 23, 2024	34.0%	61.6%	4.4%	Trump +27.6
Tennessee	through March 3, 2024	March 5, 2024	15.3%	84.4%	0.3%	Trump +69.1
Texas	through March 3, 2024	March 4, 2024	14.9%	79.4%	5.7%	Trump +64.5
Virginia	through March 3, 2024	March 4, 2024	17.4%	66.2%	16.4%	Trump +48.8
Wisconsin	through February 4, 2024	February 15, 2024	21.1%	70.9%	8.0%	Trump +49.8

RealClearPolitics

States polled	Dates administered	Dates updated	Ron DeSantis	Nikki Haley	Donald Trump	Other/ Undecided (Note: Calculated by taking the difference of 100% and all other candidates combined.)	Margin
Iowa	January 5 – 14, 2024	January 15, 2024	15.7%	18.8%	52.5%	13.0% (Note: Vivek Ramaswamy 6.8% Asa Hutchinson 0.8%)	Trump +33.7
Nevada	September 29, 2023 – January 8, 2024	January 19, 2024	10.5%	–	69.0%	20.5% (Note: Vivek Ramaswamy 5.0% Chris Christie 3.0%)	Trump +58.5
New Hampshire	January 16–22, 2024	January 23, 2024	8.0%	36.5%	55.8%	–	Trump +19.3
South Carolina	January 23, 2024 – February 10, 2024	February 15, 2024	–	30.5%	64.0%	5.5%	Trump +33.5

== Iowa caucus ==
The 2024 Iowa Republican presidential caucuses were held on January 15, 2024.

Local regression graph of all polls conducted since November 2022.

Aggregate polls

Source of poll aggregation	Dates administered	Dates updated	Ron DeSantis	Nikki Haley	Asa Hutchinson	Vivek Ramaswamy	Donald Trump	Other/ Undecided (Note: Calculated by taking the difference of 100% and all other candidates combined.)	Margin
270toWin	January 11–15, 2024	January 15, 2024	15.7%	18.5%	0.8%	6.8%	52.5%	5.7% (Note: Chris Christie 3.0% Ryan Binkley 1.5%)	Trump +34.0
FiveThirtyEight	Through January 14, 2024	January 15, 2024	15.8%	18.7%	0.7%	6.4%	52.7%	5.7%	Trump +34.0
RealClearPolling	January 5–14, 2024	January 15, 2024	15.7%	18.8%	0.8%	6.8%	52.5%	5.4%	Trump +33.7
Average			15.7%	18.7%	0.7%	6.7%	52.6%	5.6%	Trump +33.9

Poll source	Date(s) administered	Sample size (Note: Key: A – all adults RV – registered voters LV – likely voters V – unclear)	Margin of error	Doug Burgum	Chris Christie	Ron DeSantis	Larry Elder	Nikki Haley	Asa Hutchinson	Mike Pence	Vivek Ramaswamy	Tim Scott	Donald Trump	Other	Undecided
Trafalgar Group	Jan 12–14, 2024	1,092 (LV)	± 2.9%	–	–	19.3%	–	18.5%	0.7%	–	6.5%	–	52.1%	–	2.9%
Selzer & Co. (Note: Poll sponsored by the Des Moines Register, NBC News & Mediacom Iowa)	Jan 7–12, 2024	705 (LV)	± 3.7%	–	–	16%	–	20%	1%	–	8%	–	48%	3% (Note: Ryan Binkley with 1%; "None of these" with 2%)	5%
Insider Advantage	January 11, 2024	850 (LV)	± 4.3%	–	–	17%	–	17%	0%	–	7%	–	51%	–	8%
Suffolk University	Jan 6–10, 2024	500 (LV)	± 4.4%	–	–	13%	–	20%	0%	–	6%	–	54%	–	–
Civiqs	Jan 5–10, 2024	433 (LV)	± 6.4%	–	4%	14%	–	14%	0%	–	8%	–	55%	2%	3%
InsiderAdvantage	Dec 18–19, 2023	850 (LV)	± 4.36%	–	4%	15%	–	17%	0%	–	8%	–	50%	–	6%
Fox Business	Dec 14–18, 2023	804 (LV)	± 3.5%	–	3%	18%	–	16%	0%	–	7%	–	52%	1%	2%
Emerson College	Dec 15–17, 2023	420 (LV)	± 4.7%	–	4%	15%	–	17%	0%	–	8%	–	50%	–	6%
Iowa State University/Civiqs	Dec 8–13, 2023	438 (LV)	± 6.0%	–	4%	17%	–	15%	1%	–	7%	–	54%	0% (Note: Ryan Binkley and David Stuckenberg with 0%)	2%
Selzer & Co.	Dec 2–7, 2023	502 (LV)	± 4.4%	–	4%	19%	–	16%	1%	–	5%	–	51%	2% (Note: Ryan Binkley with 0%; "None of these" with 2%)	3%
Trafalgar Group	Dec 1–4, 2023	1,091 (LV)	± 2.9%	2%	4%	22%	–	19%	1%	–	5%	–	45%	–	1%
Morning Consult	Nov 1–30, 2023	324 (LV)	–	1%	2%	18%	–	11%	0%	–	13%	5%	50%	–	–
Iowa State University/Civiqs	Nov 10–15, 2023	432 (LV)	± 4.3%	1%	3%	18%	–	12%	0%	–	6%	2%	54%	0%	4%
Arc Insights (Note: Poll sponsored by Fields of Freedom)	Nov 9–14, 2023	800 (LV)	± 3.5%	1%	4%	17%	–	17%	<1%	–	5%	–	44%	2% (Note: "Someone else" with 2%)	9%
Fabrizio, Lee & Associates (Note: Poll sponsored by the Make America Great Again Inc. (Super Pac))	Nov 9–12, 2023	600 (LV)	± 4.0%	1%	5%	19%	-	16%	0%	-	4%	5%	43%	0%	7%
Fabrizio, Lee & Associates	Nov 9–12, 2023	600 (LV)	± 4.0%	2%	5%	20%	-	18%	0%	-	5%	-	44%	0%	7%
Trafalgar Group (R)	Nov 3–5, 2023	1,084 (LV)	± 2.9%	4%	5%	18%	–	15%	0%	–	5%	9%	44%	0% (Note: Ryan Binkley with 0%)	1%
Morning Consult	Oct 1–31, 2023	324 (LV)	–	1%	2%	15%	–	7%	0%	3%	9%	6%	57%	–	–
Public Opinion Strategies (Note: Poll sponsored by And To The Republic, a non-profit with ties to DeSantis)	Oct 24–26, 2023	400 (LV)	± 4.9%	1%	2%	20%	–	12%	1%	1%	4%	5%	46%	–	–
Selzer & Co.	Oct 22–26, 2023	404 (LV)	± 4.9%	3%	4%	16%	–	16%	1%	2% (Note: The other percentages in this result were increased by redistributing Pence's supporters to their second-choice candidates in the poll)	4%	7%	43%	2% (Note: "Someone else" with 2%; Ryan Binkley with 0%)	3%
Fabrizio, Lee & Associates	Oct 17–19, 2023	600 (LV)	± 4.0%	2%	3%	21%	0%	14%	0%	2%	4%	5%	42%	2% (Note: Perry Johnson with 1%)	6%
Iowa State University/Civiqs	Oct 6–10, 2023	425 (LV)	± 6.1%	0%	2%	17%	0%	11%	0%	1%	5%	4%	55%	2% (Note: Ryan Binkley with 2%; Will Hurd and Perry Johnson with 0%)	1%
Morning Consult	Sep 1–30, 2023	316 (LV)	–	1%	5%	13%	–	6%	–	7%	9%	7%	53%	–	–
CBS News/YouGov	Sep 15–24, 2023	458 (LV)	± 6.1%	0%	1%	21%	0%	8%	1%	6%	5%	6%	51%	0% (Note: Will Hurd with 0%)	–
Public Opinion Strategies (Note: Poll sponsored by Citizens Awareness Project)	Sep 19–21, 2023	400 (LV)	± 4.9%	1%	2%	21%	–	9%	0%	2%	5%	6%	45%	–	9%
Fabrizio, Lee & Associates (Note: Poll sponsored by Make America Great Again Inc. super PAC, which supports Trump)	Sep 17–19, 2023	500 (LV)	± 4.4%	1%	5%	15%	–	13%	<1%	2%	5%	5%	45%	<1% (Note: Perry Johnson & Will Hurd with <1%)	7%
Trafalgar Group (R)	Sep 14–18, 2023	1,079 (LV)	± 2.9%	4%	2%	16%	0%	8%	0%	4%	7%	7%	49%	1% (Note: Perry Johnson with 1%; Ryan Binkley with and Will Hurd with 0%)	2%
Fox Business	Sep 14–18, 2023	813 (LV)	± 3%	2%	3%	15%	<0.5%	11%	<0.5%	3%	7%	7%	46%	3% (Note: Ryan Binkley, Perry Johnson and "Other" with 1%; Asa Hutchinson and "None of the above" with <0.5%)	2%
Emerson College	Sep 7–9, 2023	357 (V)	± 5.1%	3%	–	14%	–	7%	–	3%	7%	8%	49%	6%	–
Civiqs	Sep 2–7, 2023	434 (LV)	± 5.8%	2%	3%	14%	–	10%	0%	1%	9%	6%	51%	1% (Note: Ryan Binkley with 1% and Will Hurd with 0%)	–
Public Opinion Strategies	Sep 5–6, 2023	400 (LV)	± 4.9%	1%	3%	22%	–	6%	1%	2%	6%	5%	45%	–	–
Morning Consult	Aug 1–31, 2023	341 (LV)	–	1%	4%	15%	–	6%	0%	6%	8%	7%	52%	0% (Note: Francis Suarez with 0%)	1%
Fabrizio, Lee & Associates	Aug 25–28, 2023	500 (LV)	–	2%	3%	18%	<1%	10%	1%	2%	7%	7%	44%	<2% (Note: Perry Johnson and Will Hurd with <1%; Francis Suarez with 0%)	5%
Public Opinion Strategies	August 24, 2023	400 (LV)	± 4.9%	1%	1%	21%	–	11%	1%	2%	7%	7%	41%	–	–
Public Opinion Strategies	Aug 19–21, 2023	400 (LV)	± 4.9%	3%	3%	14%	–	3%	<1%	2%	10%	3%	42%	–	–
HarrisX (Note: Poll sponsored by American Free Enterprise Chamber of Commerce)	Aug 17–21, 2023	1,120 (LV)	– (Note: Standard VI response)	2%	3%	11%	0%	4%	0%	3%	9%	8%	45%	3% (Note: "Someone else" with 2%; Ryan Binkley with 1%; Will Hurd, Perry Johnson, Corey Stapleton and Francis Suarez with 0%)	12%
HarrisX	Aug 17–21, 2023	1,120 (LV)	– (Note: If Trump did not run in the caucuses)	2%	4%	21%	1%	6%	1%	8%	18%	15%	–	4% (Note: "Someone else" with 3%; Ryan Binkley with 1%; Will Hurd, Perry Johnson, Corey Stapleton and Francis Suarez with 0%)	19%
Echelon Insights (Note: Poll commissioned by Republican Main Street Partnership)	Aug 15–17, 2023	800 (LV)	± 4.2%	2%	4%	17%	–	2%	<1%	3%	8%	3%	33%	3% (Note: "Someone else" with 2%; Will Hurd with 1%; Ryan Binkley and Francis Suarez with <1%)	14%
Selzer & Co.	Aug 13–17, 2023	406 (LV)	± 4.9%	2%	5%	19%	–	6%	–	6%	4%	9%	42%	1% (Note: Will Hurd with 1%)	5%
The Trafalgar Group (R)	Aug 14–16, 2023	1,126 (LV)	± 2.9%	3%	4%	16%	1%	5%	1%	4%	6%	13%	42%	3% (Note: Ryan Binkley and Perry Johnson with 1%; Will Hurd and Francis Suarez with 0%)	3%
New York Times/Siena College	Jul 28 – August 1, 2023	432 (LV)	± 5.9%	1%	<1%	20%	<1%	4%	<1%	3%	5%	9%	44%	<2% (Note: "Someone else" with <1%; Will Hurd with <1%; Francis Suarez with 0%)	12%
New York Times/Siena College	Jul 28 – August 1, 2023	432 (LV)	± 5.9%	–	–	39%	–	–	–	–	–	–	55%	–	4%
Manhattan Institute	Jul 2023	625 (LV)	–	3%	4%	17%	0%	5%	1%	4%	6%	10%	42%	1% (Note: "Someone else" with 1%; Francis Suarez with 0%)	7%
Morning Consult	July 1–31, 2023	350 (LV)	–	1%	2%	19%	–	4%	0%	4%	8%	5%	55%	–	2%
National Research (Note: Poll sponsored by American Greatness, which supports Trump)	Jul 23–24, 2023	500 (LV)	± 4.4%	3%	4%	15%	–	3%	0%	2%	5%	9%	42%	–	13%
Fox Business	Jul 15–19, 2023	806 (LV)	± 3.5%	3%	3%	16%	<1%	5%	1%	4%	6%	11%	46%	1% (Note: Franciz Suarez at 1%; Will Hurd at less than 1%)	4%
co/efficient (Note: Poll sponsored by Trump campaign)	Jul 15–17, 2023	2,238 (LV)	± 2.6%	–	3%	16%	–	3%	–	3%	5%	10%	46%	–	10%
National Research	Jul 5–6, 2023	500 (LV)	± 4.4%	–	3%	21%	–	2%	1%	3%	3%	7%	44%	–	14%
Morning Consult	June 1–30, 2023	317 (LV)	–	0%	1%	18%	–	2%	1%	7%	3%	3%	64%	0% (Note: Francis Saurez with 0%)	1%
McLaughlin & Associates	Jun 10–12, 2023	500 (LV)	± 4.4%	–	–	19%	–	–	–	6%	–	9%	51%	–	15%
McLaughlin & Associates	Jun 10–12, 2023	500 (LV)	± 4.4%	–	–	33%	–	–	–	–	–	–	60%	–	7%
National Research	Jun 5–7, 2023	500 (LV)	± 4.4%	–	2%	24%	–	4%	0%	4%	1%	5%	39%	–	21%
Victory Insights	Jun 3–6, 2023	450 (LV)	± 4.9%	–	3%	21%	–	5%	–	5%	2%	6%	44%	3% (Note: Someone else with 3%)	12%
Victory Insights	Jun 3–6, 2023	450 (LV)	± 4.9%	–	–	32%	–	–	–	–	–	–	49%	–	19%
WPA Intelligence (Note: Poll sponsored by Never Back Down PAC, which supports DeSantis.)	May 30 – June 1, 2023	655 (RV)	–	–	–	29%	–	6%	<1%	4%	4%	7%	39%	–	11%
WPA Intelligence	May 30 – June 1, 2023	655 (RV)	–	–	–	43%	–	–	–	–	–	–	45%	–	12%
Morning Consult	May 1–31, 2023	300 (LV)	–	–	–	17%	–	5%	0%	8%	5%	1%	60%	4% (Note: Greg Abbott with 2%; Liz Cheney and Kristi Noem with 1%)	0%
McLaughlin & Associates	May 23–25, 2023	400 (LV)	–	0%	1%	24%	1%	4%	1%	5%	2%	7%	50%	3% (Note: Mitt Romney with 3%; Rick Perry, Chris Sununu, Perry Johnson, Francis Suarez with 0%)	4%
McLaughlin & Associates	May 23–25, 2023	400 (LV)	–	–	–	36%	–	–	–	–	–	–	54%	–	11%
Emerson College	May 19–22, 2023	600 (LV)	± 3.9%	0%	–	20%	–	5%	1%	5%	2%	3%	62%	2% (Note: Someone else with 2%)	–
National Research	May 9–11, 2023	500 (LV)	± 4.4%	–	–	26%	–	6%	1%	4%	3%	1%	44%	–	11%
National Research	May 9–11, 2023	500 (LV)	± 4.4%	–	–	33%	–	–	–	–	–	–	45%	–	22%
McLaughlin & Associates	Apr 27–30, 2023	500 (LV)	± 4.4%	–	1%	20%	1%	5%	0%	7%	2%	1%	54%	5% (Note: Mitt Romney with 4%, Liz Cheney with 1%, Chris Sununu, John Bolton and Glenn Youngkin with 0%)	5%
McLaughlin & Associates	Apr 27–30, 2023	500 (LV)	± 4.4%	–	–	22%	–	–	–	–	–	–	57%	–	–
Morning Consult	Apr 1–30, 2023	294 (LV)	–	–	–	20%	–	4%	0%	7%	4%	0%	60%	3% (Note: Greg Abbott, Liz Cheney and Kristi Noem with 1%; Greg Abbott, Mike Pompeo with 0%)	2%
Victory Insights	Apr 10–13, 2023	400 (LV)	± 4.8%	–	–	24%	–	14%	4%	–	3%	–	54%	1% (Note: Perry Johnson with 1%)	–
Victory Insights	Apr 10–13, 2023	400 (LV)	± 4.8%	–	–	59%	–	24%	5%	–	8%	–	–	4% (Note: Perry Johnson with 4%)	–
Victory Insights	Apr 10–13, 2023	400 (LV)	± 4.8%	–	–	41%	–	–	–	–	–	–	59%	–	–
Cygnal	Apr 3–4, 2023	600 (LV)	± 3.9%	–	–	30%	–	5%	1%	2%	2%	1%	37%	3% (Note: Kristi Noem with 2%; Mike Pompeo with 1%)	19%
J.L. Partners	Mar 25 – April 4, 2023	628 (LV)	± 3.9%	–	–	26%	–	5%	–	3%	1%	–	41%	10% (Note: Mike Pompeo with 3%; Glenn Youngkin with 1%; "Someone else" with 6%)	14%
J.L. Partners	Mar 25 – April 4, 2023	628 (LV)	± 3.9%	–	–	39%	–	–	–	–	–	–	47%	–	15%
Morning Consult	Mar 1–31, 2023	329 (LV)	–	–	–	27%	–	5%	–	7%	–	0%	57%	2% (Note: Kristi Noem and Mike Pompeo with 1%; Greg Abbott, Liz Cheney and Glenn Youngkin with 0%)	2%
Morning Consult	Feb 1–28, 2023	281 (LV)	–	–	–	25%	–	6%	–	9%	0%	0%	52%	8% (Note: Liz Cheney and Ted Cruz with 3%; Kristi Noem and Mike Pompeo with 1%)	0%
Morning Consult	Jan 1–31, 2023	367 (LV)	–	–	–	27%	–	5%	–	9%	–	1%	51%	5% (Note: Ted Cruz with 3%; Greg Abbott, Kristi Noem and Mike Pompeo with 1%, Liz Cheney with 0%)	2%
Morning Consult	Dec 1–31, 2022	227 (LV)	–	–	–	35%	–	2%	–	11%	–	1%	44%	8% (Note: Kristi Noem with 3%; Ted Cruz with 2%; Greg Abbott, Liz Cheney and Mike Pompeo with 1%, Glenn Youngkin with 0%)	0%
WPA Intelligence (Note: Poll sponsored by Club for Growth)	Nov 11–13, 2022	508 (LV)	± 4.4%	–	–	48%	–	–	–	–	–	–	37%	–	16%
WPA Intelligence	Aug 7–10, 2022	508 (LV)	± 4.4%	–	–	37%	–	–	–	–	–	–	52%	–	12%
Neighborhood Research and Media (Note: Poll sponsored by Courageous Conservatives PAC)	Jun 22 – July 1, 2022	546 (LV)	± 4.2%	–	–	17%	–	2%	–	2%	–	–	38%	4% (Note: Kim Reynolds, Kristi Noem, Ted Cruz, and Marco Rubio with 1%)	–
Victory Insights	Mar 5–8, 2021	630 (RV)	–	–	–	4%	–	6%	–	8%	–	–	61%	13% (Note: Mitt Romney with 5%; Ted Cruz with 4%; Kristi Noem and Mike Pompeo with 2%)	–
Victory Insights	Mar 5–8, 2021	630 (RV)	–	–	–	20%	–	10%	–	19%	–	–	–	33% (Note: Ted Cruz with 16%; Mitt Romney with 5%; Kristi Noem and Mike Pompeo with 6%)	–

== New Hampshire primary ==
The 2024 New Hampshire Republican presidential primary was held on January 23, 2024.

Local regression graph of all polls conducted since November 2022.

Aggregate polls

Source of poll aggregation	Dates administered	Dates updated	Nikki Haley	Donald Trump	Other/ Undecided (Note: Calculated by taking the difference of 100% and all other candidates combined.)	Margin
270 to Win	January 22–23, 2024	January 23, 2024	35.7%	56.5%	7.8% (Note: Ron DeSantis 7.3%)	Trump +20.8
FiveThirtyEight	Through January 22, 2024	January 23, 2024	36.3%	53.9%	9.8%	Trump +17.6
RealClearPolling	January 16–22, 2024	January 23, 2024	36.5%	55.8%	7.7%	Trump +19.3
Average			36.2%	55.4%	8.4%	Trump +19.2

Poll source	Date(s) administered	Sample size	Margin of error	Doug Burgum	Chris Christie	Ron DeSantis	Nikki Haley	Asa Hutchinson	Mike Pence	Vivek Ramaswamy	Tim Scott	Donald Trump	Other	Undecided
Suffolk University/Boston Globe/WBTS	Jan 21–22, 2024	500 (LV)	± 4.4%	–	–	–	38%	–	–	–	–	60%	1%	1%
Insider Advantage	January 21, 2024	850 (LV)	±4.32%	–	–	–	35%	–	–	–	–	62%	–	3%
Suffolk University/Boston Globe/WBTS	Jan 20–21, 2024	500 (LV)	± 4.4%	–	–	–	38%	–	–	–	–	57%	2%	2%
Suffolk University/Boston Globe/WBTS	Jan 19–20, 2024	500 (LV)	± 4.4%	–	–	6%	36%	–	–	–	–	55%	0.6%	2.4%
American Research Group	Jan 18–20, 2024	600 (LV)	±4.0%	–	–	6%	44%	–	–	–	–	46%	–	–
Emerson College/WHDH	Jan 18–20, 2024	673 (RV)	±3.7%	–	–	8%	35%					50%		7%
Suffolk University/Boston Globe/WBTS	Jan 17–18, 2024	500 (LV)	± 4.4%	–	–	6%	35%	–	–	–	–	52%	–	4%
Suffolk University/Boston Globe/WBTS	Jan 16–17, 2024	500 (LV)	± 4.4%	–	–	6%	36%	–	–	–	–	50%	1%	4%
Saint Anselm College	January 16, 2024	1,398 (LV)	± 2.6%	–	–	6%	38%	–	–	–	–	52%	–	4%
Suffolk University/Boston Globe/WBTS	Jan 15–16, 2024	500 (LV)	± 4.4%	–	–	5%	34%	–	–	–	–	50%	–	11%
American Research Group	Jan 12–15, 2024	600 (LV)	± 4.0%	–	–	4%	40%	1%	–	4%	–	40%	2%	9%
Saint Anselm College	Jan 8–9, 2024	1,194 (LV)	± 2.8%	–	9%	6%	31%	–	–	6%	–	45%	–	3%
University of New Hampshire Survey/CNN	Jan 4–8, 2024	919 (LV)	± 3.2%	–	12%	5%	32%	0%	–	8%	–	39%	0%	5%
American Research Group	December 27, 2023 – January 4, 2024	600 (LV)	± 4.0%	–	10%	5%	33%	1%	–	4%	–	37%	1%	9%
American Research Group	Dec 14–20, 2023	600 (LV)	± 4.0%	–	13%	6%	29%	1%	–	5%	–	33%	1%	12%
Saint Anselm College	Dec 18–19, 2023	1,072 (LV)	± 3.0%	–	12%	6%	30%	0%	–	5%	–	44%	–	3%
University of Massachusetts Lowell/YouGov	Dec 7–18, 2023	450 (LV)	± 5.4%	–	6%	10%	22%	1%	–	4%	–	52%	0% (Note: "Another candidate" with 0%)	5%
CBS News/YouGov	Dec 8–15, 2023	855 (LV)	± 4.1%	–	10%	11%	29%	1%	–	5%	–	44%	–	–
Trafalgar Group	Dec 9–11, 2023	1,098 (LV)	± 2.9%	–	14%	11%	18%	0%	–	10%	–	45%	–	1%
Americans for Prosperity	Nov 19–21, 2023	800 (LV)	–	–	–	9%	25%	–	–	–	–	40%	26%	–
University of New Hampshire Survey Center/CNN	Nov 10–14, 2023	994 (LV)	± 3.1%	2%	14%	9%	20%	0%	–	8%	–	42%	3%	2%
Washington Post/Monmouth University	Nov 9–14, 2023	606 (LV)	± 4.5%	2%	11%	7%	18%	1%	–	8%	3%	46%	0%	4%
Emerson College/WHDH	Nov 10–13, 2023	465 (RV)	± 3.3%	1.5%	8.8%	7.2%	17.6%	0.3%	–	4.6%	2.2%	48.5%	–	9.3%
USA TODAY/Boston Globe/Suffolk University	Sep 28 – October 2, 2023	500 (LV)	± 4.4%	1%	6%	10%	19%	–	1%	4%	4%	49%	–	–
CBS News/YouGov	Sep 15–24, 2023	502 (LV)	± 5.4%	2%	8%	13%	11%	1%	2%	8%	5%	50%	0% (Note: Larry Elder & Will Hurd with 0%)	–
Saint Anselm College	Sep 19–20, 2023	931 (LV)	± 3.2%	1%	10%	11%	15%	1%	1%	6%	3%	45%	0% (Note: Larry Elder, Will Hurd & Perry Johnson with 0%)	6%
Insider Advantage	September 20, 2023	850 (LV)	± 3.36%	4%	10%	8%	14%	1%	1%	5%	5%	42%	1% (Note: Perry Johnson with 1%; Ryan Binkley, Larry Elder & Will Hurd with 0%)	9%
University of New Hampshire	Sep 14–18, 2023	1,006 (LV)	± 3.4%	1%	11%	10%	12%	0%	2%	13%	6%	39%	1% (Note: Will Hurd with 1%; Larry Elder & "Other" with 0%)	6%
NMB Research	Aug 25–31, 2023	800 (LV)	–	1%	8%	10%	10%	1%	4%	8%	5%	47%	<3% (Note: Larry Elder and Will Hurd with 1%; Refused 1%)	4%
Fabrizio, Lee & Associates	Aug 25–28, 2023	500 (LV)	–	2%	5%	11%	9%	<1%	1%	9%	5%	48%	<3% (Note: Larry Elder and Will Hurd with 1%; Perry Johnson with <1%; Francis Suarez with 0%)	9%
Echelon Insights (Note: Poll commissioned by Republican Main Street Partnership)	Aug 15–17, 2023	800 (LV)	± 4.0%	2%	14%	9%	3%	1%	3%	11%	7%	34%	3% (Note: Will Hurd with 3%; Ryan Binkley, Larry Elder, and Francis Suarez with 0%)	12%
Emerson College	Aug 9–11, 2023	498 (RV)	± 4.9%	4%	9%	8%	4%	–	1%	3%	6%	49%	3% (Note: Perry Johnson with 2%; Will Hurd with 1%)	13%
co/efficient	Aug 5–7, 2023	862 (LV)	± 3.3%	4%	9%	9%	7%	1%	3%	5%	5%	43%	3% (Note: "Someone else" with 3%)	13%
Manhattan Institute	July 2023	603 (LV)	–	3%	11%	13%	7%	1%	4%	8%	7%	34%	3% (Note: "Someone else" with 2%; Francis Suarez with 1%; Larry Elder with 0%)	8%
National Research (Note: Poll sponsored by American Greatness PAC, which supports Trump.)	Jul 25–26, 2023	500 (LV)	± 4.4%	5%	8%	11%	3%	1%	2%	6%	8%	41%	–	15%
University of New Hampshire	Jul 13–17, 2023	898 (LV)	± 3.3%	6%	6%	23%	5%	0%	1%	5%	8%	37%	1% (Note: Will Hurd with 1%; Francis Suarez with 0%)	8%
National Research	Jul 10–12, 2023	500 (LV)	± 4.4%	3%	7%	15%	5%	1%	1%	4%	6%	39%	–	17%
American Pulse	Jul 5–11, 2023	895	± 3.2%	3%	10%	11%	3%	–	5%	5%	7%	48%	–	8% (Note: Calculated by subtracting the candidates' percentages from 100; the source does not give a number)
Saint Anselm College	Jun 21–23, 2023	494 (LV)	± 4.4%	2%	6%	19%	5%	2%	2%	2%	4%	47%	0% (Note: Suarez with 0%)	10%
New Hampshire Journal/co-efficient	Jun 14–16, 2023	904 (LV)	± 3.3%	–	9%	13%	3%	–	5%	3%	3%	47%	5%	10%
New Hampshire Journal/co-efficient	Jun 14–16, 2023	904 (LV)	± 3.3%	–	–	23%	–	–	–	–	–	49%	–	28%
National Research	Jun 12–14, 2023	500 (LV)	± 4.4%	–	7%	12%	5%	2%	3%	3%	7%	44%	18% (Note: Undecided, Other & Refused)	–
National Research	May 15–17, 2023	500 (LV)	± 4.4%	–	–	18%	3%	1%	1%	6%	1%	39%	32% (Note: Chris Sununu with 17%; "Undecided, Other & Refused" with 15%)	–
University of New Hampshire	Apr 13–17, 2023	818 (LV)	± 3.4%	–	1%	22%	3%	0%	3%	3%	2%	42%	20% (Note: Chris Sununu with 12%; Liz Cheney with 4%; Mike Pompeo with 2%; Kristi Noem with 1%; John Bolton and Marco Rubio with 0%; "Other" with 1%)	4%
J.L Partners	Apr 2–11, 2023	623 (LV)	± 3.9%	–	2%	18%	4%	–	2%	1%	1%	51%	19% (Note: Chris Sununu with 10%; Liz Cheney with 4%; Mike Pompeo and Glenn Youngkin with 1%; "Someone else" with 1%)	6%
J.L Partners	Apr 2–11, 2023	623 (LV)	± 3.9%	–	–	33%	–	–	–	–	–	53%	–	13%
Saint Anselm College	Mar 28–30, 2023	1,320 (RV)	± 4.0%	–	1%	29%	4%	–	1%	3%	1%	42%	19% (Note: Chris Sununu with 14%; Liz Cheney with 2%; Mike Pompeo with 1%; Kristy Noem with 0%; Other with 2%.)	–
Emerson College	Mar 3–5, 2023	384 (RV)	± 5.0%	–	–	17%	6%	–	4%	–	1%	58%	14% (Note: Chris Sununu with 7%; Mike Pompeo with 2%; Larry Hogan with 1%; Kristi Noem with 1%; "Someone else" with 3%)	–
co/efficient	Jan 25–26, 2023	506 (LV)	± 4.35%	–	–	–	–	–	–	–	–	43%	42%	15%
co/efficient	Jan 25–26, 2023	506 (LV)	± 4.35%	–	–	26%	4%	–	3%	–	–	37%	13% (Note: Chris Sununu with 13%; Glenn Youngkin with 0%)	18%
University of New Hampshire	Jan 19–23, 2023	349 (LV)	± 5.2%	–	–	42%	8%	–	1%	–	0%	30%	16% (Note: Liz Cheney, Chris Sununu and Larry Hogan with 4%; Kristi Noem with 2%; Ted Cruz and Marco Rubio with 1%; Mike Pompeo and Glenn Youngkin with 0%)	3%
Neighborhood Research and Media	Dec 5–13, 2022	434 (LV)	± 4.7%	–	–	33%	–	–	3%	–	–	32%	13%	19%
WPA Intelligence	Nov 11–13, 2022	401 (LV)	± 4.9%	–	–	52%	–	–	–	–	–	37%	–	11%
	November 8, 2022	2022 midterm elections												
Saint Anselm College	Aug 9–11, 2022	820 (RV)	± 3.4%	–	–	29%	3%	–	3%	–	1%	50%	4% (Note: Liz Cheney with 4%; Ted Cruz and Mike Pompeo with 1%; Larry Hogan with 0%)	8%
WPA Intelligence	Aug 7–10, 2022	401 (LV)	± 4.9%	–	–	45%	–	–	–	–	–	45%	–	10%
Neighborhood Research and Media (Note: Poll sponsored by the Courageous Conservatives PAC)	Jul 5–8, 2022	475 (RV)	± 4.5%	–	–	22%	1%	–	1%	–	–	41%	3% (Note: Chris Sununu, Rand Paul and Mike Pompeo with 1%)	32%
University of New Hampshire	Jun 16–20, 2022	318 (LV)	± 5.5%	–	–	39%	6%	–	9%	–	0%	37%	6% (Note: Ted Cruz, Kristi Noem, and Mike Pompeo with 1%; Rick Scott with 0%; "Other" with 3%)	3%
University of New Hampshire	Oct 14–18, 2021	441 (LV)	± 4.7%	–	–	18%	6%	–	4%	–	–	43%	14% (Note: Tom Cotton and Ted Cruz with 2%; Kristi Noem with 1%; Mike Pompeo with 0%; "Other" with 9%)	10%
University of New Hampshire	Jul 15–19, 2021	770 (LV)	± 3.5%	–	–	19%	6%	–	5%	–	–	43%	13% (Note: Ted Cruz and Kristi Noem with 2%; Tom Cotton and Mike Pompeo with 0%; "Other" with 9%)	10%
Saint Anselm College (Note: Poll sponsored by the John Bolton Super PAC)	May 7–10, 2021	635 (RV)	± 3.9%	–	–	20%	7%	–	4%	–	0%	52%	7% (Note: Ted Cruz, Kristi Noem and Marco Rubio with 2%; Mitt Romney with 1%; Liz Cheney and John Kasich with 0%)	10%
Victory Insights	Mar 5–11, 2021	400 (RV)	–	–	–	5%	3%	–	6%	–	–	52%	14% (Note: Mitt Romney with 13%; Ted Cruz with 1%; Kristi Noem and Mike Pompeo with 0%)	–
Victory Insights	Mar 5–11, 2021	400 (RV)	–	–	–	21%	7%	–	18%	–	–	–	29% (Note: Mitt Romney with 15%; Ted Cruz with 10%; Mike Pompeo with 3%; Kristi Noem with 1%)	–
	January 20, 2021	Inauguration of Joe Biden												
Praecones Analytica	Nov 30 – December 2, 2020	624 (RV)	± 4.0%	–	–	–	7%	–	6%	–	2%	57%	19% (Note: Mitt Romney with 7%; Ted Cruz with 4%; Donald Trump Jr. with 3%; Tom Cotton and Marco Rubio with 2%; Tucker Carlson with 1%)	10%
Praecones Analytica	Nov 30 – December 2, 2020	624 (RV)	± 4.0%	–	–	–	12%	–	25%	–	3%	–	46% (Note: Donald Trump Jr. with 14%; Ted Cruz with 10%; Mitt Romney with 8%; Tom Cotton with 6%; Tucker Carlson and Marco Rubio with 4%)	14%

== Nevada primary and caucus ==
The 2024 Nevada Republican presidential primary and caucus was held on February 6 and February 8, 2024, respectively.

Source of poll aggregation	Dates administered	Dates updated	Donald Trump	Other/ Undecided (Note: Calculated by taking the difference of 100% and all other candidates combined.)	Margin
RealClearPolling	September 29, 2023 – January 8, 2024	January 21, 2024	69.0%	31.0% (Note: Ron DeSantis 10.5% Vivek Ramaswamy 5.0% Chris Christie 3.0%)	Trump +58.5

Poll source	Date(s) administered	Sample size	Margin of error	Chris Christie	Ron DeSantis	Nikki Haley	Asa Hutchinson	Mike Pence	Vivek Ramaswamy	Tim Scott	Donald Trump	Other	Undecided
McLaughlin & Associates (Note: Poll sponsored by Trump's campaign)	Dec 11–13, 2023	400 (LV)	± 4.9%	5%	15%	–	–	–	2%	–	75%	0% (Note: Ryan Binkley with 0%)	3%
SSRS/CNN	Sep 29 – October 6, 2023	650 (LV)	± 5.3%	2%	13%	6%	–	3%	4%	2%	65%	4% (Note: "Someone else" with 2%; Doug Burgum & Larry Elder with 1%; Will Hurd & Perry Johnson with 0%)	2%
National Research (Note: Poll sponsored by American Greatness PAC)	Jun 26–28, 2023	500 (LV)	± 4.4%	3%	22%	3%	0%	2%	2%	2%	52%	–	14% (Note: Other, undecided, and refused)
National Research	May 30 – June 1, 2023	500 (LV)	± 4.4%	–	21%	3%	0%	1%	2%	2%	53%	0% (Note: Chris Sununu with 0%)	17%
Vote TXT	May 15–19, 2023	112 (RV)	± 4.8%	–	21%	5%	–	2%	3%	–	51%	7%	11%
Susquehanna Polling & Research	Oct 24–27, 2022	500 (LV)	± 4.3%	–	34%	1%	–	7%	–	–	41%	7% (Note: Ted Cruz with 5%; Mike Pompeo and Marco Rubio with 1%; Larry Hogan with 0%)	10%

== South Carolina primary ==
The 2024 South Carolina Republican presidential primary was held on February 24, 2024. Aggregate polls

Source of poll aggregation	Dates administered	Dates updated	Nikki Haley	Donald Trump	Other/ Undecided (Note: Calculated by taking the difference of 100% and all other candidates combined.)	Margin
270toWin	February 16–20, 2024	February 21, 2024	34.6%	61.6%	3.8%	Trump +27.0
FiveThirtyEight	through February 23, 2024	February 24, 2024	34.0%	61.6%	4.4%	Trump +27.6
RealClearPolling	February 14, 2024 – February 23, 2024	February 23, 2024	37.5%	60.8%	1.7%	Trump +23.3

Poll source	Date(s) administered	Sample size	Margin of error	Doug Burgum	Chris Christie	Ron DeSantis	Nikki Haley	Asa Hutchinson	Mike Pence	Vivek Ramaswamy	Tim Scott	Donald Trump	Other	Undecided
Trafalgar Group	Feb 21–23, 2024	1093 (LV)	± 2.9%	–	–	–	37.5%	–	–	–	–	58.9%	–	3.6% (Note: Listed as undecided and other)
Suffolk University/USA Today	Feb 15–18, 2024	500 (LV)	± 4.4%	–	–	–	35%	–	–	–	–	63%	–	2% (Note: Listed as undecided/other)
Emerson College/The Hill	Feb 15–17, 2024	1197 (LV)	± 2.8%	–	–	–	35.4%	–	–	–	–	57.9%	–	6.7%
Insider Advantage	Feb 14–15, 2024	800 (LV)	± 3.9%	–	–	–	38%	–	–	–	–	60%	1%	1%
Trafalgar Group	Feb 13–15, 2024	1,089 (LV)	± 2.9%	–	–	–	33.6%	–	–	–	–	63.3%	–	3%
The Citadel	Feb 5–11, 2024	505 (LV)	± 5.7%	–	–	–	31%	–	–	–	–	64%	3%	2%
Winthrop University	Feb 2–10, 2024	749 (LV)	± 3.6%	–	–	–	28.7%	–	–	–	–	64.9%	3.3%	2%
Washington Post/Monmouth University	Jan 26–30, 2024	815 (LV)	± 3.9%	–	–	–	32%	–	–	–	–	58%	2%	8%
Fabrizio, Lee & Associates	Jan 28–29, 2024	600 (LV)	± 4.0%	–	–	–	31%	–	–	–	–	66%	–	4%
The Tyson Group/The American Promise	Jan 24–26, 2024	543 (LV)	± 4.4%	–	–	–	31%	–	–	–	–	58%	–	11%
Fabrizio, Lee & Associates	Jan 17–18, 2024	600 (LV)	± 4.0%	–	–	–	28%	–	–	–	–	68%	–	4%
Emerson College	Jan 2–3, 2024	584 (LV)	± 4.0%	–	4.8%	6.6%	25.1%	0.2%	–	3.1%	–	54.4%	–	1.9%
Trafalgar Group	Dec 6–8, 2023	1,087 (LV)	± 2.9%	–	5.8%	14.4%	22.8%	0.3%	–	6.1%	–	48.7%	–	1.9%
Morning Consult	Nov 1–30, 2023	856 (LV)	–	0%	2%	13%	19%	–	–	3%	7%	57%	–	–
Winthrop University Center for Public Opinion & Policy Research	Nov 4–12, 2023	780 (RV)	± 3.51%	0.3%	1.6%	12.5%	18.7%	0.4%	–	3.4%	10.6%	47.6%	2.1% (Note: Someone Else with 1.5%; Refused with 0.6%)	2.7%
Morning Consult	Oct 1–31, 2023	927 (LV)	–	0%	1%	11%	15%	0%	3%	6%	7%	58%	–	–
CNN/SSRS	Oct 18–25, 2023	738 (LV)	± 4.8%	0%	2%	11%	22%	0% (Note: No voters)	2%	1%	6%	53%	0% (Note: Perry Johnson & Someone Else with 0%; Larry Elder with no voters)	1%
Morning Consult	Sep 1–30, 2023	854 (LV)	–	–	1%	10%	13%	0%	3%	6%	7%	59%	0% (Note: Will Hurd with 0%)	1%
Fox Business	Sep 14–18, 2023	809 (LV)	± 3.5%	<0.5%	4%	10%	18%	1%	4%	5%	9%	46%	1% (Note: Will Hurd with 1%; Larry Elder & Perry Johnson with less than 0.5%)	3%
Washington Post/Monmouth University	Sep 6–11, 2023	506 (LV)	± 4.6%	0%	5%	9%	18%	2%	3%	3%	10%	46%	1% (Note: "Someone else" with 1%)	4%
Morning Consult	Aug 1–31, 2023	910 (LV)	–	–	1%	14%	11%	0%	4%	8%	7%	55%	0%	–
Trafalgar Group (R)	Aug 17–19, 2023	1,054 (LV)	± 2.9%	0%	2%	14%	8%	0%	2%	6%	14%	48%	0% (Note: Larry Elder, Will Hurd, Pery Johnson, Francis Suarez and Ryan Binkley with 0%)	1%
Morning Consult	July 1–31, 2023	907 (LV)	–	0%	1%	15%	12%	1%	3%	6%	7%	54%	0% (Note: Francis Suarez with 0%)	1%
Fox Business	Jul 15–19, 2023	809 (LV)	± 3.5%	<0.5%	2%	13%	14%	1%	4%	3%	10%	48%	– (Note: Larry Elder, Will Hurd, Francis Suarez, "Other" and "None of the above" with <0.5%)	4%
Morning Consult	June 1–30, 2023	907 (LV)	–	0%	1%	20%	12%	0%	4%	3%	10%	48%	1% (Note: Liz Cheney with 1%; Greg Abbott, Will Hurd, and Kristi Noem with 0%)	1%
National Public Affairs	Jun 20–21, 2023	809 (LV)	–	1%	5%	18%	12%	2%	2%	2%	10%	41%	–	6%
Morning Consult	May 1–31, 2023	875 (LV)	–	–	–	19%	13%	0%	4%	3%	7%	52%	1% (Note: Liz Cheney with 1%; Greg Abbott, Kristi Noem, and Glenn Youngkin with 0%)	1%
National Research (Note: Poll sponsored by American Greatness, which supports Trump)	May 24–25, 2023	500 (LV)	± 4.38%	–	–	18%	10%	1%	1%	1%	12%	43%	1% (Note: Chris Sununu with 1%)	13%
National Public Affairs	May 15–17, 2023	590 (LV)	± 4.0%	–	–	23%	15%	3%	2%	2%	10%	38%	–	8%
Morning Consult	Apr 1–30, 2023	810 (LV)	–	–	–	17%	17%	0%	5%	1%	4%	52%	3% (Note: Liz Cheney with 2%; Glenn Youngkin with 1%; Greg Abbott, Kristi Noem, and Mike Pompeo with 0%)	1%
National Public Affairs	Apr 11–14, 2023	588 (LV)	± 4.2%	–	–	21%	19%	1%	2%	1%	7%	43%	1% (Note: Mike Pompeo with 1%)	6%
Winthrop University	Mar 25 – April 1, 2023	485 (RV)	± 4.6%	–	–	20%	18%	0%	5%	–	7%	41%	5% (Note: Mike Pompeo with 2%, Chris Sununu with 1% Glenn Youngkin with 0%; "Someone else" with 2%)	4%
Morning Consult	Mar 1–31, 2023	806 (LV)	–	–	–	22%	15%	–	5%	0%	4%	49%	3% (Note: Liz Cheney with 2%; Mike Pompeo with 1%; Greg Abbott, Kristi Noem, and Glenn Youngkin with 0%)	2%
Morning Consult	Feb 1–28, 2023	689 (LV)	–	–	–	24%	18%	–	5%	–	7%	43%	4% (Note: Liz Cheney with 2%; Kristi Noem and Mike Pompeo with 1%; Ted Cruz with 1%)	–
Neighbourhood Research and Media	Feb 7–14, 2023	300 (LV)	± 5.9%	–	–	22%	16%	–	2%	–	2%	35%	–	23%
Morning Consult	Jan 1–31, 2023	974 (LV)	–	–	–	31%	14%	–	2%	–	5%	45%	2% (Note: Liz Cheney and Ted Cruz with 1%; Greg Abbott, Kristi Noem, and Glenn Youngkin with 0%)	1%
Trafalgar Group	Jan 24–26, 2023	1,078 (LV)	± 2.9%	–	–	–	33%	–	6%	–	–	52%	9% (Note: Mike Pompeo with 9%)	–
Trafalgar Group	Jan 24–26, 2023	1,078 (LV)	± 2.9%	–	–	–	21%	–	3%	–	23%	48%	5% (Note: Mike Pompeo with 5%)	–
Trafalgar Group	Jan 24–26, 2023	1,078 (LV)	± 2.9%	–	–	29%	22%	–	4%	–	–	43%	2% (Note: Mike Pompeo with 2%)	–
Trafalgar Group	Jan 24–26, 2023	1,078 (LV)	± 2.9%	–	–	28%	12%	–	2%	–	14%	43%	1% (Note: Mike Pompeo with 1%)	–
Moore Information	Jan 18–24, 2023	450 (LV)	± 5.0%	–	–	31%	12%	–	4%	–	5%	41%	–	7%
Moore Information	Jan 18–24, 2023	450 (LV)	± 5.0%	–	–	–	29%	–	–	–	–	62%	–	9%
Moore Information	Jan 18–24, 2023	450 (LV)	± 5.0%	–	–	42%	–	–	–	–	–	49%	–	15%
Spry Strategies	Jan 17–19, 2023	386 (LV)	–	–	–	52%	–	–	–	–	–	33%	–	15%
Morning Consult	Dec 1–31, 2022	530 (LV)	–	–	–	28%	13%	–	4%	–	5%	44%	6% (Note: Liz Cheney with 2%; Greg Abbott, Ted Cruz, Kristi Noem, and Mike Pompeo with 1%)	–
Winthrop University	Oct 22 – November 5, 2022	1,298 (A)	± 2.8%	–	–	–	37%	–	–	–	–	45%	–	19%
Echelon Insights	Aug 31 – September 7, 2022	294 (LV)	± 5.1%	–	–	33%	–	–	–	–	–	58%	–	9%
Trafalgar Group	Mar 25–29, 2021	1,014 (LV)	± 3.0%	–	–	–	–	–	–	–	–	64%	11% (Note: "Would vote for anyone other than Trump" with 9%; would not vote with 2%)	25% (Note: "Would consider voting for Trump" with 20%; Undecided with 6%)

== Michigan primary and caucus ==
The 2024 Michigan Republican presidential primary and caucus were held on February 27 and March 2, 2024, respectively.

Source of poll aggregation	Dates administered	Dates updated	Nikki Haley	Donald Trump	Other/ Undecided (Note: Calculated by taking the difference of 100% and all other candidates combined.)	Margin
FiveThirtyEight	through February 24, 2024	February 27, 2024	21.8%	78.7%	-	Trump +56.9

Poll source	Date(s) administered	Sample size	Margin of error	Doug Burgum	Chris Christie	Ron DeSantis	Nikki Haley	Will Hurd	Asa Hutchinson	Perry Johnson	Mike Pence	Vivek Ramaswamy	Tim Scott	Donald Trump	Other	Undecided
Emerson College/The Hill	Feb 20–24, 2024	486 (LV)	±3%	–	–	–	20.3%	–	–	–	–	–	–	69.2%	–	10.5%
Michigan Information and Research Service (MIRS)	Jan 4–10, 2024	600 (LV)	±4%	3%	8%	9%	19%	–	–	–	–	2%	–	53%	–	6%
CNN/SSRS	Nov 30 – December 7, 2023	618 (LV)	± 3.4%	1%	6%	15%	13%	–	1%	–	–	4%	–	58%	1%	3%
Morning Consult	Nov 1–30, 2023	1,348 (LV)	–	0%	3%	13%	10%	–	0%	–	–	8%	1%	65%	–	–
Morning Consult	Oct 1–31, 2023	1,342 (LV)	–	1%	3%	10%	6%	0%	0%	–	7%	9%	1%	63%	–	–
Public Policy Polling (D)	Oct 9–10, 2023	430 (LV)	± 4.7%	2%	3%	13%	6%	–	0%	–	2%	3%	0%	63%	–	8%
Morning Consult	Sep 1–30, 2023	1,238 (LV)	–	0%	4%	12%	6%	0%	0%	–	7%	10%	1%	58%	–	2%
Susquehanna University	Sep 7–12, 2023	219 (LV)	–	0%	0%	18%	3%	–	0%	–	5%	5%	0%	65%	–	–
Morning Consult	Aug 1–31, 2023	1,299 (LV)	–	0%	4%	15%	3%	0%	1%	–	8%	8%	2%	59%	0% (Note: Francis Suarez with 0%)	–
Emerson College	Aug 1–2, 2023	498 (RV)	± 4.3%	1%	2%	13%	3%	0%	1%	0%	7%	4%	2%	61%	1%	6%
Morning Consult	July 1–31, 2023	1,350 (LV)	–	–	3%	18%	3%	0%	1%	–	10%	7%	2%	55%	–	1%
Mitchell Research (Note: Poll commissioned by MIRS)	Jul 11–13, 2023	639 (LV)	± 4.0%	–	–	13%	1%	–	–	0%	3%	–	2%	69%	–	11%
Morning Consult	June 1–30, 2023	1,242 (LV)	–	1%	2%	25%	3%	0%	2%	–	9%	3%	3%	52%	1% (Note: Liz Cheney with 1%; Greg Abbott and Kristi Noem with 0%)	–
Morning Consult	May 1–31, 2023	1,354 (LV)	–	–	–	25%	2%	–	1%	–	9%	5%	1%	53%	5% (Note: Liz Cheney with 3%; Glenn Youngkin, Greg Abbott, and Kristi Noem with 0%)	1%
Morning Consult	Apr 1–30, 2023	1,356 (LV)	–	–	–	26%	3%	–	0%	–	10%	2%	1%	53%	5% (Note: Liz Cheney with 3%; Mike Pompeo and Glenn Youngkin with 1%; Greg Abbott and Kristi Noem with 0%)	–
Morning Consult	Mar 1–31, 2023	1,378 (LV)	–	–	–	30%	3%	–	–	–	10%	0%	1%	51%	5% (Note: Liz Cheney with 3%; Greg Abbott and Mike Pompeo with 1%; Kristi Noem and Glenn Youngkin with 0%)	–
Morning Consult	Feb 1–28, 2023	1,232 (LV)	–	–	–	32%	4%	–	–	–	10%	0%	1%	46%	6% (Note: Liz Cheney with 3%; Greg Abbott, Kristi Noem, and Mike Pompeo with 1%; Ted Cruz and Glenn Youngkin with 0%)	1%
Echelon Insights	Feb 13–16, 2023	400 (V)	± 6.0%	–	–	47%	–	–	–	–	–	–	–	42%	11%	–
Morning Consult	Jan 1–31, 2023	1,709 (LV)	–	–	–	33%	1%	–	–	–	10%	–	0%	48%	5% (Note: Liz Cheney with 3%; Mike Pompeo and Ted Cruz with 1%; Kristi Noem, Greg Abbott, and Glenn Youngkin with 0%)	3%
Morning Consult	Dec 1–31, 2022	909 (LV)	–	–	–	32%	1%	–	–	–	10%	–	0%	50%	7% (Note: Ted Cruz with 3%; Liz Cheney with 2%; Mike Pompeo and Kristi Noem with 1%; Greg Abbott and Glenn Youngkin with 0%)	–
Glengariff Group	Jul 13–15, 2022	500 (LV)	± 4.4%	–	–	42%	–	–	–	–	–	–	–	45%	13%	–

== Missouri caucus ==
The 2024 Missouri Republican presidential caucuses were held on March 2, 2024.

Poll source	Date(s) administered	Sample size	Margin of error	Ron DeSantis	Nikki Haley	Mike Pence	Donald Trump	Other	Undecided
Remington Research	Feb 8–9, 2023	820 (LV)	–	35%	8%	–	38%	–	–
Remington Research	Feb 8–9, 2023	820 (LV)	–	45%	–	–	38%	–	–
Remington Research	Nov 15–16, 2022	940 (LV)	± 3.0%	47%	–	–	38%	–	15%
Remington Research	Nov 15–16, 2022	940 (LV)	± 3.0%	38%	–	–	36%	7% (Note: Josh Hawley with 7%)	19%
Remington Research	Jul 27–28, 2022	818 (LV)	± 3.4%	18%	–	–	42%	23% (Note: Josh Hawley with 6%; "Someone else" with 17%)	17%
	January 20, 2021	Inauguration of Joe Biden							
Remington Research	Dec 2–3, 2020	840 (RV)	± 3.4%	–	–	32%	–	42% (Note: Josh Hawley with 29%; Ivanka Trump with 13%)	26%

== Alabama primary ==
Poll source	Date(s) administered	Sample size	Margin of error	Ron DeSantis	Nikki Haley	Donald Trump	Other	Undecided
Cygnal/Alabama Daily News	Jan 29–30, 2024	515 (LV)	± 4.31%	–	16%	76%	–	8%
Public Opinion Strategies (Note: Poll sponsored by Alabama Families for Great Schools)	Jan 15–17, 2023	500 (LV)	± 4.38%	50%	–	31%	–	19%
Public Opinion Strategies	Jan 15–17, 2023	500 (LV)	± 4.38%	53%	–	35%	–	12%
Cygnal/Alabama Daily News	Oct 27–29, 2022	616 (LV)	± 3.94%	36%	1%	50%	5%	8%

== Arkansas primary ==
Poll source	Date(s) administered	Sample size	Margin of error	Ron DeSantis	Donald Trump	Undecided
Echelon Insights	Aug 31 – Sep 7, 2022	184 (LV)	± 7.7%	29%	58%	13%

== California primary ==
Aggregate polls

Source of poll aggregation	Dates administered	Dates updated	Nikki Haley	Donald Trump	Other/ Undecided (Note: Calculated by taking the difference of 100% and all other candidates combined.)	Margin
FiveThirtyEight	through February 4, 2024	February 10, 2024	19.0%	73.1%	7.9%	Trump +54.1

Poll source	Date(s) administered	Sample size	Margin of error	Chris Christie	Ron DeSantis	Larry Elder	Nikki Haley	Asa Hutchinson	Mike Pence	Vivek Ramaswamy	Tim Scott	Donald Trump	Other	Undecided
Morning Consult	Nov 1–30, 2023	2,347 (LV)	–	2%	10%	–	8%	0%	–	7%	–	71%	1% (Note: Burgum at 1%)	–
Public Policy Institute of California	Nov 9–16, 2023	276 (LV)	–	5%	12%	–	13%	0%	–	2%	2%	56%	1% (Note: Kristi Noem at 1%; Perry Johnson at 0% and Glenn Youngkin at 0%)	9%
Emerson College	Nov 11–14, 2023	331 (LV)	–	4%	11%	-	5%	2%	–	3%	-	63%	1% (Note: Doug Burgum with 1%)	11%
UC Berkeley IGS	Oct 24–30, 2023	1,234 (LV)	± 4.0%	2%	12%	1%	9%	–	–	3%	1%	57%	5%	11%
Public Policy Institute of California	Oct 3–19, 2023	316 (LV)	–	4%	12%	0%	9%	0%	6%	5%	3%	53%	5% (Note: "Someone else" with 4%; Glenn Youngkin with 1%; Doug Burgum, Will Hurd, Perry Johnson, Kristi Noem & "Would not vote" with 0%)	1%
Data Viewpoint	October 1, 2023	533 (RV)	± 4.3%	5.5%	17.5%	–	15.2%	<1%	3.0%	3.6%	2.9%	49.8%	1.7% (Note: Doug Burgum with 1.7%; Glenn Youngkin with <1%)	–
California's Choice	Aug 27–29, 2023	750 (LV)	–	4.8%	21.6%	–	15.6%	0.5%	4.4%	9.6%	0.8%	43.4%	2.6%	–
UC Berkeley IGS	Aug 24–29, 2023	1,175 (LV)	± 4.0%	3%	16%	1%	7%	–	3%	4%	2%	55%	–	9%
Public Policy Institute of California	Jun 7–29, 2023	267 (LV)	–	3%	24%	–	3%	–	6%	1%	5%	50%	7% (Note: Liz Cheney with 3%; Kristi Noem and "Someone else" with 2%)	1%
Emerson College	Jun 4–7, 2023	329 (LV)	± 2.9%	2%	19%	–	6%	–	10%	2%	4%	53%	7% (Note: Doug Burgum and Chris Sununu with 1%)	–
Public Policy Institute of California	May 17–24, 2023	295 (LV)	± 7%	1%	21%	–	3%	–	10%	1%	2%	50%	11% (Note: Liz Cheney with 7%; Kristi Noem with 2%; Chris Sununu with 1%)	2%
UC Berkeley IGS	May 17–22, 2023	1,835 (RV)	± 3.5%	1%	26%	0%	3%	0%	4%	2%	1%	44%	6% (Note: Liz Cheney with 4%; Kristi Noem, Chris Sununu with 1%; Perry Johnson and John Bolton with 0%)	13%
UC Berkeley IGS	Feb 14–20, 2023	1,755 (RV)	± 3.5%	–	37%	–	7%	–	3%	–	1%	29%	8% (Note: Liz Cheney with 4%; Kristi Noem and Mike Pompeo with 2%; Ted Cruz with 1%; Chris Sununu and Glenn Youngkin with 0%)	10%
UC Berkeley IGS	Feb 14–20, 2023	1,755 (RV)	± 3.5%	–	50%	–	–	–	–	–	–	33%	6% (Note: Neither with 6%)	11%
UC Berkeley IGS	Aug 9–15, 2022	9,254 (RV)	± 3.0%	0%	27%	–	3%	–	7%	–	0%	38%	10% (Note: Ted Cruz and Mike Pompeo with 2%; Marco Rubio and Larry Hogan with 1%; Tom Cotton, and Glenn Youngkin with 0%)	14%
UC Berkeley IGS	Aug 9–15, 2022	9,254 (RV)	± 3.0%	0%	53%	–	4%	–	9%	–	1%	–	15% (Note: Mike Pompeo with 4%; Ted Cruz with 3%; Marco Rubio with 2%; Larry Hogan with 1%; Tom Cotton and Glenn Youngkin with 0%)	17%

== Maine caucus ==
Poll source	Date(s) administered	Sample size	Margin of error	Liz Cheney	Ron DeSantis	Nikki Haley	Mike Pence	Mike Pompeo	Vivek Ramaswamy	Chris Sununu	Donald Trump
Digital Research Inc.	Mar 22 – April 22, 2023	192 (LV)	–	10%	27%	3%	5%	1%	1%	1%	59%

Hypothetical polling

Maine's 2nd congressional district

Poll source	Date(s) administered	Sample size	Margin of error	Nikki Haley	Mike Pence	Other	Undecided
	January 3, 2023	Redrawing of congressional districts after the 2020 redistricting cycle					
	January 20, 2021	Inauguration of Joe Biden					
	November 3, 2020	2020 presidential election					
SurveyUSA	Jun 30 – July 6, 2020	604 (LV)	± 4.1%	12%	30%	36% (Note: Ted Cruz with 12%; Donald Trump Jr. with 11%; Ivanka Trump with 7%; Marco Rubio with 6%)	21%

== Massachusetts primary ==
Source of poll aggregation	Dates administered	Dates updated	Nikki Haley	Donald Trump	Other/ Undecided (Note: Calculated by taking the difference of 100% and all other candidates combined.)	Margin
270ToWin	February 7–8, 2024	February 15, 2024	29.3%	63.0%	7.7%	Trump +33.7
FiveThirtyEight	through February 6, 2024	March 5, 2024	29.3%	66.6%	4.1%	Trump +37.3

Poll source	Date(s) administered	Sample size (Note: Key: A – all adults RV – registered voters LV – likely voters V – unclear)	Margin of error	Ron DeSantis	Nikki Haley	Mike Pence	Tim Scott	Donald Trump	Other	Undecided
YouGov (Note: Poll sponsored by the University of Massachusetts Amherst Department of Political Science & WCVB)	Oct 13–20, 2023	107 (V)	± 5.1%	15%	12%	3%	6%	54%	10% (Note: "Someone else" with 4%; Doug Burgum with 3%; Vivek Ramaswamy with 2%; Chris Christie with 1%)	–
UMass-Amherst	Mar 28 – Apr 5, 2023	154 (RV)	–	18%	4%	10%	1%	59%	8% (Note: Liz Cheney with 3%; "Someone else" with 5%)	–
UMass-Amherst	Mar 28 – Apr 5, 2023	154 (RV)	–	32%	–	–	–	68%	–	–
Opinion Diagnostics	Mar 31 – Apr 1, 2023	475 (LV)	± 4.5%	21%	9%	3%	–	45%	3%	19%
Opinion Diagnostics	Mar 31 – Apr 1, 2023	475 (LV)	± 4.5%	32%	–	–	–	46%	–	22%
UMass-Amherst	Jun 15–21, 2022	237 (RV)	–	24%	6%	6%	1%	51%	11% (Note: Mike Pompeo with 3%; "Someone else" with 8%)	–

== North Carolina primary ==
Source of poll aggregation	Dates administered	Dates updated	Nikki Haley	Donald Trump	Other/ Undecided (Note: Calculated by taking the difference of 100% and all other candidates combined.)	Margin
270ToWin	February 5–7, 2024	February 15, 2024	21.5%	74.5%	4.0%	Trump +53.0
FiveThirtyEight	through February 4, 2024	February 15, 2024	22.1%	74.7%	4.2%	Trump +52.6

Poll source	Date(s) administered	Sample size	Margin of error	Chris Christie	Ron DeSantis	Nikki Haley	Asa Hutchinson	Mike Pence	Vivek Ramaswamy	Tim Scott	Donald Trump	Other	Undecided
Capen Analytics	Feb 21, 2024	12,580 (LV)	± 5.0%	–	–	36%	–	–	–	–	64%	–	–
Public Policy Polling (D)	Jan 5–6, 2024	619 (LV)	± 3.9%	3%	9%	12%	0%	–	4%	–	66%	0% (Note: Ryan Binkley with 0%)	5%
ECU Center for Survey Research	Nov 29 – Dec 1, 2023	445 (LV)	± 5.4%	2%	10%	13%	1%	–	3%	–	63%	–	8%
Morning Consult	Nov 1–30, 2023	1,342 (LV)	–	4%	14%	9%	1%	–	5%	1%	67%	0% (Note: Doug Burgum with 0%)	–
Meredith College	Nov 1–5, 2023	335 (LV)	± 3.5%	6%	14%	9%	0%	-	8%	3%	51%	2% (Note: "Someone else" with 2%; Ryan Binkley, Doug Burgum, Corey Stapleton with 0%)	6%
Morning Consult	Oct 1–31, 2023	1,337 (LV)	–	3%	14%	8%	0%	4%	6%	2%	61%	0% (Note: Doug Burgum and Will Hurd with 0%)	2%
Morning Consult	Sep 1–30, 2023	1,366 (LV)	–	3%	15%	8%	0%	5%	7%	2%	58%	0% (Note: Doug Burgum and Will Hurd with 0%)	2%
Meredith College	Sep 16–19, 2023	350 (RV)	± 3.5%	3%	13%	6%	0%	5%	8%	3%	51%	6% (Note: Ryan Binkley, Doug Burgum, Larry Elder, Will Hurd, Perry Johnson & "Someone else" with 1%; Corey Stapleton with 0%)	7%
Morning Consult	Aug 1–31, 2023	1,491 (LV)	–	3%	15%	6%	1%	5%	10%	2%	57%	0% (Note: Doug Burgum, Will Hurd, and Francis Suarez with 0%)	1%
Morning Consult	July 1–31, 2023	1,535 (LV)	–	3%	15%	5%	0%	6%	9%	3%	58%	0% (Note: Doug Burgum, Will Hurd and Francis Suarez with 0%)	1%
Morning Consult	June 1–30, 2023	1,454 (LV)	–	2%	20%	5%	1%	7%	4%	3%	56%	1% (Note: Liz Cheney with 1%; Greg Abbott, Doug Burgum, Will Hurd, Kristi Noem, and Francis Suarez with 0%)	1%
Opinion Diagnostics	Jun 5–7, 2023	408 (LV)	± 4.8%	2%	22%	7%	1%	6%	1%	4%	44%	2% (Note: "Someone Else" with 2%)	11%
Opinion Diagnostics	Jun 5–7, 2023	408 (LV)	± 4.8%	–	34%	–	–	–	–	–	50%	–	15%
Morning Consult	May 1–31, 2023	1,453 (LV)	–	–	20%	6%	1%	6%	3%	2%	59%	3% (Note: Liz Cheney with 2%; Greg Abbott with 1%; Kristi Noem and Glenn Youngkin with 0%)	1%
Morning Consult	Apr 1–30, 2023	1,299 (LV)	–	–	23%	6%	0%	5%	1%	1%	58%	4% (Note: Liz Cheney with 2%; Kristi Noem and Mike Pompeo with 1%; Greg Abbott and Glenn Youngkin with 0%)	2%
SurveyUSA (Note: Poll conducted for the John Locke Foundation)	Apr 25–29, 2023	707 (LV)	± 4.4%	–	22%	5%	1%	8%	2%	1%	55%	0% (Note: Chris Sununu with 0%)	5%
Morning Consult	Mar 1–31, 2023	1,31 (LV)	–	–	27%	9%	–	8%	0%	1%	51%	2% (Note: Liz Cheney with 2%; Greg Abbott, Kristi Noem, Mike Pompeo and Glenn Youngkin with 0%)	2%
Morning Consult	Feb 1–28, 2023	1,185 (LV)	–	–	31%	7%	–	6%	–	1%	51%	3% (Note: Liz Cheney with 2%; Ted Cruz with 1%; Greg Abbott, Kristi Noem, Mike Pompeo and Glenn Youngkin with 0%)	1%
Morning Consult	Jan 1–31, 2023	1,703 (LV)	–	–	30%	4%	–	7%	–	1%	52%	5% (Note: Liz Cheney and Ted Cruz with 2%; Mike Pompeo with 1%; Greg Abbott, Kristi Noem, and Glenn Youngkin with 0%)	1%
Differentiators Data	Jan 9–12, 2023	213 (LV)	± 4.5%	–	47%	4%	–	2%	–	–	35%	3% (Note: Mike Pompeo with 2%)	–
Morning Consult	Dec 1–31, 2022	905 (LV)	–	–	31%	4%	–	7%	–	1%	50%	5% (Note: Liz Cheney with 3%; Ted Cruz with 2%; Greg Abbott, Kristi Noem, Mike Pompeo, and Glenn Youngkin with 0%)	2%
Differentiators Data	Dec 8–11, 2022	500 (LV)	± 4.5%	–	56%	–	–	–	–	–	35%	–	–
John Bolton Super PAC	Jul 22–24, 2022	149 (LV)	–	1%	27%	–	–	6%	–	–	37%	12% (Note: Marco Rubio with 5%; Ted Cruz and Liz Cheney with 3%; Mike Pompeo with 1%)	16%
Atlantic Polling Strategies (Note: Poll conducted for the North Carolina Chamber of Commerce)	Apr 25–28, 2022	534 (LV)	± 4.9%	–	23%	5%	–	4%	–	4%	52%	2% (Note: Ted Cruz with 2%)	10%
Spry Strategies	Apr 6–10, 2022	600 (LV)	± 4.0%	–	19%	8%	–	6%	–	1%	45%	9% (Note: Ted Cruz with 6%; Mike Pompeo with 2%; Kristi Noem with 1%)	12%
Spry Strategies	Apr 6–10, 2022	600 (LV)	± 4.0%	–	32%	8%	–	9%	–	2%	–	18% (Note: Ted Cruz with 11%; Mike Pompeo with 5%; Kristi Noem with 2%)	31%
Cygnal (R)	Apr 1–3, 2022	600 (LV)	± 4.0%	–	26%	8%	–	6%	–	–	45%	2% (Note: Ted Cruz with 2%)	13%
Cygnal (R)	Jan 7–9, 2022	600 (LV)	± 4.0%	–	19%	8%	–	5%	–	2%	47%	3% (Note: Ted Cruz with 2%; Kristi Noem with 1%)	16%
	Jan 20, 2021	Inauguration of Joe Biden											
BUSR/UNLV Lee Business School	Nov 30 – Dec 2, 2020	221 (RV)	± 7.0%	–	–	6%	–	–	–	–	76%	13% (Note: Ted Cruz and Mitt Romney with 3%; Marco Rubio with 2%; "Someone else" with 5%)	6%
BUSR/UNLV Lee Business School	Nov 30 – Dec 2, 2020	221 (RV)	± 7.0%	–	–	9%	–	48%	–	–	–	25% (Note: Ted Cruz and Mitt Romney with 9%; Marco Rubio with 3%; "Someone else" with 4%)	18%

== Oklahoma primary ==
Poll source	Date(s) administered	Sample size	Margin of error	Chris Christie	Ron DeSantis	Nikki Haley	Asa Hutchinson	Mike Pence	Vivek Ramaswamy	Tim Scott	Donald Trump	Other	Undecided
Morning Consult	Nov 1–30, 2023	637(LV)	–	3%	12%	6%	0%	–	7%	1%	69%	0% (Note: Doug Burgum with 0%)	2%
Morning Consult	Oct 1–31, 2023	625(LV)	–	5%	7%	4%	0%	7%	6%	1%	68%	0% (Note: Will Hurd with 0%)	2%
Morning Consult	Sep 1–30, 2023	566(LV)	–	4%	8%	3%	0%	11%	7%	1%	63%	0% (Note: Doug Burgum and Will Hurd with 0%)	2%
Morning Consult	Aug 1–31, 2023	602(LV)	–	3%	11%	3%	0%	6%	10%	2%	63%	1% (Note: Will Hurd with 1%; Doug Burgum with 0%)	1%
Morning Consult	July 1–31, 2023	629(LV)	–	2%	13%	2%	1%	7%	10%	2%	63%	0% (Note: Doug Burgum and Francis Suarez with 0%)	–
Morning Consult	June 1–30, 2023	559(LV)	–	3%	14%	3%	0%	7%	4%	2%	66%	1% (Note: Liz Cheney with 1%; Greg Abbott with 0%)	–
Morning Consult	May 1–31, 2023	627(LV)	–	–	16%	2%	1%	7%	5%	1%	64%	3% (Note: Liz Cheney with 2%; Kristi Noem with 1%; Greg Abbott with 0%)	1%
Morning Consult	Apr 1–30, 2023	560(LV)	–	–	14%	2%	–	8%	2%	2%	67%	4% (Note: Liz Cheney with 3%; Greg Abbott with 1%; Kristi Noem, Mike Pompeo, and Glenn Youngkin with 0%)	1%
C.H.S. & Associates	Mar 27–31, 2023	300 (RV)	± 4.3%	–	29%	6%	–	6%	–	–	38%	9% (Note: Ted Cruz with 4%; Mike Pompeo with 2%; "Someone else" with 3%)	11%
Morning Consult	Mar 1–31, 2023	615(LV)	–	–	20%	3%	–	10%	1%	1%	58%	7% (Note: Liz Cheney with 3%; Glenn Youngkin with 2%; Greg Abbott and Mike Pompeo with 1%; Kristi Noem with 0%)	–
Morning Consult	Feb 1–28, 2023	473(LV)	–	–	24%	3%	–	8%	1%	0%	58%	7% (Note: Liz Cheney with 3%; Ted Cruz with 2%; Greg Abbott and Mike Pompeo with 1%; Kristi Noem with 0%)	–
Morning Consult	Jan 1–31, 2023	697(LV)	–	–	27%	1%	–	9%	–	0%	57%	5% (Note: Ted Cruz with 2%; Greg Abbott, Mike Pompeo, and Glenn Youngkin with 1%; Liz Cheney and Kristi Noem with 0%)	1%
Morning Consult	Dec 1–31, 2022	414 (LV)	–	–	29%	2%	–	8%	–	–	55%	7% (Note: Greg Abbott with 3%; Liz Cheney and Ted Cruz with 2%; Mike Pompeo with 0%)	–
Echelon Insights	Aug 31 – Sep 7, 2022	265 (LV)	–	–	30%	–	–	–	–	–	60%	–	10%
Amber Integrated	Aug 11–15, 2022	684 (LV)	–	2%	22%	2%	–	6%	–	1%	50%	11% (Note: Mitt Romney with 4%; Ted Cruz with 2%; Marco Rubio, Mike Pompeo with 1%; "Other" with 3%)	7%
Amber Integrated	Aug 11–15, 2022	684 (LV)	–	2%	49%	5%	–	10%	–	1%	–	27% (Note: Ted Cruz with 7%; Donald Trump Jr. with 6%; Mitt Romney and Marco Rubio with 4%; Mike Pompeo with 2%; "Someone else" with 4%)	9%

== Tennessee primary ==
Poll source	Date(s) administered	Sample size	Margin of error	Doug Burgum	Chris Christie	Ron DeSantis	Nikki Haley	Asa Hutchinson	Mike Pence	Vivek Ramaswamy	Tim Scott	Donald Trump	Other	Undecided
Targoz Market Research (Note: Poll sponsored by the Beacon Center of Tennessee)	Dec 14–28, 2023	522 (LV)	± 2.66%	–	1%	12%	7%	0%	–	2%	–	72%	1%	6%
Morning Consult	Nov 1–30, 2023	1,078 (LV)	–	0%	2%	17%	8%	1%	–	4%	1%	66%	–	1%
Morning Consult	Oct 1–31, 2023	1,061 (LV)	–	0%	1%	14%	6%	0%	6%	5%	2%	63%	–	3%
Morning Consult	Sep 1–30, 2023	1,032 (LV)	–	0%	2%	15%	5%	0%	5%	6%	2%	63%	0% (Note: Will Hurd with 0%)	2%
Morning Consult	Aug 1–31, 2023	1,109 (LV)	–	1%	2%	13%	2%	1%	8%	10%	3%	59%	0% (Note: Francis Suarez and Will Hurd with 0%)	1%
Morning Consult	July 1–31, 2023	1,079 (LV)	–	0%	2%	17%	2%	0%	10%	9%	2%	57%	0%	1%
Morning Consult	June 1–30, 2023	1,072 (LV)	–	0%	1%	21%	3%	0%	9%	3%	3%	59%	1% (Note: Liz Cheney with 1%; Greg Abbott, Will Hurd, and Kristi Noem with 0%)	–
The Beacon Center	Jun 14–22, 2023	502 (LV)	–	–	–	12%	–	–	8%	1%	1%	61%	–	9%
Morning Consult	May 1–31, 2023	1,147 (LV)	–	–	–	18%	3%	0%	7%	2%	1%	64%	3% (Note: Liz Cheney with 2%; Greg Abbott with 1%; Kristi Noem and Glenn Youngkin with 0%)	2%
Morning Consult	Apr 1–30, 2023	986 (LV)	–	–	–	22%	3%	0%	8%	1%	1%	61%	5% (Note: Liz Cheney with 2%; Greg Abbott, Mike Pompeo, and Glenn Youngkin with 1%; Kristi Noem with 0%)	–
Vanderbilt University	Apr 19–23, 2023	1,003 (RV)	± 3.6%	–	–	25%	4%	2%	5%	–	3%	59%	–	–
Vanderbilt University	Apr 19–23, 2023	1,003 (RV)	± 3.6%	–	–	38%	–	–	–	–	–	57%	–	–
Morning Consult	Mar 1–31, 2023	1,027 (LV)	–	–	–	25%	3%	–	8%	–	1%	59%	5% (Note: Liz Cheney with 3%; Kristi Noem and Mike Pompeo with 1%; Greg Abbott and Glenn Youngkin with 0%)	–
Morning Consult	Feb 1–28, 2023	980 (LV)	–	–	–	29%	3%	–	8%	–	0%	55%	5% (Note: Liz Cheney and Ted Cruz with 2%; Mike Pompeo with 1%; Greg Abbott, Kristi Noem, and Glenn Youngkin with 0%)	–
Morning Consult	Jan 1–31, 2023	1,265 (LV)	–	–	–	35%	1%	–	10%	–	1%	47%	6% (Note: Ted Cruz with 2%; Greg Abbott, Mike Pompeo, Liz Cheney, and Glenn Youngkin with 1%; Kristi Noem with 0%)	1%
Morning Consult	Dec 1–31, 2022	698 (LV)	–	–	–	34%	0%	–	10%	–	1%	51%	3% (Note: Ted Cruz with 2%; Liz Cheney with 1%; Greg Abbott, Mike Pompeo, and Kristi Noem with 0%)	1%
Vanderbilt University	Nov 8–28, 2022	474 (RV)	± 3.4%	–	–	54%	–	–	–	–	–	41%	–	5%

== Texas primary ==
Poll source	Date(s) administered	Sample size	Margin of error	Doug Burgum	Chris Christie	Ron DeSantis	Nikki Haley	Asa Hutchinson	Mike Pence	Vivek Ramaswamy	Tim Scott	Donald Trump	Other	Undecided
YouGov (Note: Poll sponsored by the Texas Political Project at the University of Texas)	Dec 1–10, 2023	552 (RV)	± 4.17%	1%	2%	12%	9%	–	–	4%	–	65%	2% (Note: "Anyone/Any of them" & "No one/None of them" with 1%; "Someone else" with 0%)	6%
Morning Consult	Nov 1–30, 2023	3,064 (LV)	–	1%	2%	12%	7%	1%	–	7%	1%	69%	–	–
CWS Research (Note: Poll sponsored by Defend Texas Liberty PAC)	Nov 20–22, 2023	458 (LV)	± 4.579%	0%	3%	11%	11%	–	–	2%	–	61%	–	11%
CWS Research	Nov 20–22, 2023	458 (LV)	± 4.579%	–	–	22%	–	–	–	–	–	63%	–	14%
CWS Research	Nov 20–22, 2023	458 (LV)	± 4.579%	–	–	–	20%	–	–	–	–	70%	–	10%
Morning Consult	Oct 1–31, 2023	3,187 (LV)	–	0%	2%	11%	6%	0%	5%	7%	2%	66%	0% (Note: Will Hurd with 0%)	1%
YouGov	Oct 5–17, 2023	568 (RV)	± 4.11%	0%	1%	13%	7%	1%	3%	3%	1%	62%	3% (Note: Will Hurd, "Someone else" & "Anyone" with 1%; "No one" with 0%)	5%
CWS Research	October 5–9, 2023	418 (LV)	± 4.793%	0%	1%	9%	11%	N/A	2%	5%	1%	58%	–	13%
CWS Research	October 5–9, 2023	418 (LV)	± 4.793%	–	–	24%	–	–	–	–	–	59%	–	17%
Morning Consult	Sep 1–30, 2023	3,099 (LV)	–	1%	1%	13%	4%	1%	5%	9%	2%	62%	0% (Note: Will Hurd with 0%)	2%
CWS Research	Sep 1–4, 2023	406 (LV)	± 4.864%	0%	2%	10%	5%	1%	5%	3%	1%	61%	2% (Note: Will Hurd with 2%)	10%
CWS Research	Sep 1–4, 2023	406 (LV)	± 4.864%	–	–	24%	–	–	–	–	–	62%	–	14%
Morning Consult	Aug 1–31, 2023	3,070 (LV)	–	0%	2%	12%	3%	0%	7%	11%	3%	61%	1% (Note: Will Hurd with 1%)	–
CWS Research	Jul 30–31, 2023	606 (LV)	± 3.981%	0%	4%	13%	3%	1%	4%	4%	5%	48%	3% (Note: Will Hurd with 3%)	15%
CWS Research	Jul 30–31, 2023	606 (LV)	± 3.981%	–	–	29%	–	–	–	–	–	53%	–	19%
Morning Consult	July 1–31, 2023	3,156 (LV)	–	0%	1%	15%	3%	0%	8%	9%	4%	59%	0% (Note: Will Hurd and Francis Suarez with 0%)	1%
CWS Research	Jun 28–30, 2023	764 (LV)	± 3.546%	0%	3%	19%	4%	1%	5%	2%	3%	51%	3% (Note: Will Hurd with 3%)	10%
CWS Research	Jun 28–30, 2023	764 (LV)	± 3.546%	–	–	32%	–	–	–	–	–	53%	–	15%
Morning Consult	June 1–30, 2023	2,929 (LV)	–	0%	1%	18%	3%	1%	7%	4%	3%	59%	2% (Note: Greg Abbott with 2%; Liz Cheney, Kristi Noem, Will Hurd, and Francis Suarez with 0%)	2%
Morning Consult	May 1–31, 2023	2,829 (LV)	–	–	–	19%	4%	0%	5%	3%	2%	58%	7% (Note: Greg Abbott with 6%; Liz Cheney with 1%; Kristi Noem and Glenn Youngkin with 0%)	2%
CWS Research	May 26–30, 2023	1,024 (LV)	± 3.07%	–	–	23%	3%	2%	4%	2%	3%	47%	4% (Note: Ted Cruz with 4%)	13%
CWS Research	May 26–30, 2023	1,024 (LV)	± 3.07%	–	–	33%	–	–	–	–	–	51%	–	16%
Texas Hispanic Policy Foundation	May 8–17, 2023	1,000 (RV)	± 2.9%	–	–	36%	–	–	–	–	–	57%	2% (Note: "Would not vote" with 2%)	5%
CWS Research	Apr 29 – May 1, 2023	699 (LV)	± 3.7%	–	–	16%	5%	0%	3%	3%	1%	54%	4% (Note: Ted Cruz with 4%)	15%
Morning Consult	Apr 1–30, 2023	2,736 (LV)	–	–	–	20%	3%	0%	6%	2%	1%	57%	9% (Note: Greg Abbott with 7%; Liz Cheney with 2%; Kristi Noem, Mike Pompeo, and Glenn Youngkin with 0%)	2%
CWS Research	Mar 30 – Apr 2, 2023	1,067 (LV)	± 3.0%	–	–	20%	4%	–	5%	2%	1%	52%	5% (Note: Ted Cruz with 3%; Mike Pompeo with 2%)	12%
Morning Consult	Mar 1–31, 2023	2,629 (LV)	–	–	–	24%	4%	–	7%	0%	1%	53%	11% (Note: Greg Abbott with 7%; Liz Cheney with 2%; Kristi Noem and Mike Pompeo with 1%; Glenn Youngkin with 0%)	–
CWS Research	Feb 28 – Mar 2, 2023	879 (LV)	± 3.3%	–	–	27%	5%	–	4%	2%	1%	43%	5% (Note: Ted Cruz with 4%; Mike Pompeo with 1%)	13%
Morning Consult	Feb 1–28, 2023	2,376 (LV)	–	–	–	27%	3%	–	6%	0%	1%	51%	12% (Note: Greg Abbott with 7%; Liz Cheney with 2%; Ted Cruz, Kristi Noem, and Mike Pompeo with 1%; Glenn Youngkin with 0%)	–
Morning Consult	Jan 1–31, 2023	3,187 (LV)	–	–	–	28%	2%	–	9%	–	0%	48%	13% (Note: Greg Abbott with 7%; Ted Cruz with 3%; Liz Cheney with 2%; Mike Pompeo with 1%; Kristi Noem & Glenn Youngkin with 0%)	–
Morning Consult	Dec 1–31, 2022	1,871 (LV)	–	–	–	30%	2%	–	8%	–	0%	45%	15% (Note: Greg Abbott with 7%; Ted Cruz with 4%; Liz Cheney with 3%; Mike Pompeo with 1%; Kristi Noem & Glenn Youngkin with 0%)	–
CWS Research	Dec 19–21, 2022	1,051 (LV)	± 3.0%	–	–	36%	4%	–	4%	–	1%	37%	7% (Note: Ted Cruz with 4%; Mike Pompeo with 2%)	11%
CWS Research	Nov 27–28, 2022	860 (LV)	± 3.3%	–	–	34%	4%	–	5%	–	1%	37%	5% (Note: Ted Cruz with 3%; Mike Pompeo with 2%)	13%
CWS Research (Note: Poll sponsored by the Republican Party of Texas)	Nov 12–13, 2022	1,099 (LV)	± 3.0%	–	–	43%	4%	–	5%	–	1%	32%	1% (Note: Mike Pompeo with 1%)	14%
CWS Research	Oct 19–23, 2022	823 (RV)	–	–	–	29%	3%	–	4%	–	–	46%	7% (Note: Greg Abbott with 4%; Ted Cruz with 3%)	11%
Echelon Insights	Aug 31 – Sep 7, 2022	378 (LV)	± 4.4%	–	–	37%	–	–	–	–	–	53%	–	10%
CWS Research	Aug 9–11, 2022	1,581 (RV)	± 2.5%	–	–	21%	5%	–	6%	–	–	51%	7% (Note: Greg Abbott with 4%; Ted Cruz with 3%)	10%
CWS Research	Jul 9–10, 2022	1,918 (RV)	± 2.2%	–	–	26%	5%	–	6%	–	–	45%	20% (Note: Ted Cruz with 12%; Greg Abbott with 8%; Glen Youngkin with 0%)	9%
CWS Research	Jun 7–8, 2022	665 (RV)	± 3.8%	–	–	26%	4%	–	5%	–	–	49%	8% (Note: Ted Cruz with 4%; Greg Abbott and Marco Rubio with 2%)	8%
CWS Research	May 4–10, 2022	992 (LV)	± 3.1%	–	–	28%	7%	–	–	–	–	44%	13% (Note: Ted Cruz with 6%; Greg Abbott with 5%; Kristi Noem with 2%)	8%
CWS Research	Mar 29 – Apr 1, 2022	678 (LV)	± 3.8%	–	–	20%	10%	–	–	–	–	46%	16% (Note: Ted Cruz with 8%; Greg Abbott with 6%; Kristi Noem with 2%)	8%

Polls without Donald Trump

Poll source	Date(s) administered	Sample size	Margin of error	Greg Abbott	Ted Cruz	Ron DeSantis	Nikki Haley	Mike Pence	Mike Pompeo	Other	Undecided
CWS Research	Nov 12–13, 2022	1,099 (LV)	± 3.0%	–	–	66%	5%	8%	3%	2% (Note: Tim Scott with 2%)	16%
CWS Research	Oct 19–23, 2022	823 (RV)	–	8%	8%	64%	5%	4%	–	–	11%
CWS Research	Aug 9–11, 2022	1,581 (RV)	± 2.5%	8%	10%	58%	7%	8%	–	–	9%
CWS Research	Jul 9–10, 2022	1,918 (RV)	± 2.2%	4%	5%	56%	5%	8%	–	1% (Note: Glen Youngkin with 1%)	10%
CWS Research	Jun 7–8, 2022	665 (RV)	± 3.8%	7%	11%	57%	3%	8%	–	3% (Note: Marco Rubio with 3%)	11%
CWS Research	May 4–10, 2022	992 (LV)	± 3.1%	10%	14%	56%	9%	–	–	3% (Note: Kristi Noem with 3%)	8%
CWS Research	Mar 29 – Apr 1, 2022	678 (LV)	± 3.8%	10%	19%	48%	13%	–	–	3%	7%
CWS Research	Feb 5–7, 2022	715 (LV)	–	13%	–	46%	–	–	–	18%	23%

== Utah caucus ==
Poll source	Date(s) administered	Sample size	Margin of error	Chris Christie	Ron DeSantis	Nikki Haley	Mike Pence	Vivek Ramaswamy	Tim Scott	Donald Trump	Other	Undecided
Dan Jones & Associates	Oct 12–23, 2023	509 (RV)	–	3%	14%	13%	5%	4%	1%	30%	–	20%
Dan Jones & Associates	Sep 24–29, 2023	802 (RV)	± 4.32%	4%	15%	11%	5%	5%	1%	33%	6%	22%
Dan Jones & Associates	Aug 7–14, 2023	476 (RV)	± 4.49%	4%	19%	4%	9%	5%	2%	27%	18% (Note: "Another candidate" with 11%; Liz Cheney with 5%; Asa Hutchinson with 2%)	13%
Noble Perspective Insights	Jul 7–18, 2023	301 (RV)	± 5.65%	2%	18%	3%	10%	6%	3%	48%	10% (Note: "None of these candidates" with 7%; "Someone else not listed" with 3%; Larry Elder and Francis Suarez with 0%)	–
Dan Jones & Associates	Jun 26 – Jul 4, 2023	495 (RV)	± 4.4%	4%	24%	3%	6%	2%	2%	29%	13% (Note: Liz Cheney with 4%; "Another candidate" with 9%)	16%
Dan Jones & Associates	May 22 – Jun 1, 2023	421 (RV)	± 4.8%	–	26%	5%	5%	4%	3%	27%	16% (Note: Liz Cheney with 7%; Ted Cruz with 3%; Asa Hutchinson with 1%; and "Another candidate" with 5%)	16%
Dan Jones & Associates	April 25–28, 2023	800 (RV)	± 3.5%	–	19%	8%	6%	–	–	21%	24% (Note: Liz Cheney with 11%; Ted Cruz with 4%; and "Another candidate" with 9%)	22%
WPA Intelligence (Note: Poll sponsored by Never Back Down PAC, which supports DeSantis)	April 18–20, 2023	504 (RV)	± 4.0%	–	46%	–	–	–	–	35%	–	19%
OH Predictive Insights	March 14–23, 2023	302 (RV)	± 5.6%	–	23%	5%	10%	–	0%	41%	5% (Note: Marco Rubio with 3%; Larry Hogan and Glenn Youngkin with 1%; Mike Pompeo, Chris Sununu and Asa Hutchinson with 0%)	–
Dan Jones & Associates	March 14–22, 2023	801 (RV)	± 3.5%	–	31%	5%	4%	–	–	23%	12% (Note: Liz Cheney with 9%; Ted Cruz with 3%)	–
OH Predictive Insights	Dec 27, 2022 – Jan 4, 2023	302 (RV)	± 5.6%	1%	29%	3%	11%	–	–	42%	12% (Note: Liz Cheney with 6%; Ted Cruz with 3%; Marco Rubio with 2%; Glenn Youngkin at 1%; Kristi Noem, Mike Pompeo and Kanye West at 0%)	2%
Dan Jones & Associates	Nov 18–23, 2022	802 (RV)	± 3.5%	–	24%	4%	6%	–	–	15%	30% (Note: Liz Cheney with 16%; Ted Cruz with 6%; Other with 8%)	21%
OH Predictive Insights	Nov 5–15, 2021	333 (RV)	± 5.4%	1%	7%	4%	9%	–	–	43%	25% (Note: Mitt Romney with 20%; Ted Cruz with 3%; Liz Cheney and Marco Rubio with 1%)	10%
OH Predictive Insights	Nov 5–15, 2021	333 (RV)	± 5.4%	1%	18%	5%	13%	–	–	–	32% (Note: Mitt Romney with 21%; Ted Cruz with 8%; Liz Cheney with 2%; Marco Rubio with 1%)	20%

== Virginia primary ==
Poll source	Date(s) administered	Sample size	Margin of error	Doug Burgum	Chris Christie	Ron DeSantis	Larry Elder	Nikki Haley	Asa Hutchinson	Mike Pence	Vivek Ramaswamy	Tim Scott	Donald Trump	Glenn Youngkin	Other	Undecided
Roanoke College	Feb 11–19, 2024	392 (LV)	± 4.6%	–	–	–	–	43%	–	–	–	–	51%	–	–	–
Morning Consult	Jan 23 – February 4, 2024	436 (LV)	–	–	–	–	–	19%	–	–	–	–	78%	–	–	–
Morning Consult	Nov 1–30, 2023	942(LV)	–	0%	5%	14%	–	9%	–	–	7%	1%	63%	–	–	1%
Roanoke College	Nov 12–20, 2023	686 (A)	± 4.3%	0%	2%	14%	–	10%	–	–	3%	1%	51%	10%	–	9%
Morning Consult	Oct 1–31, 2023	942 (LV)	–	0%	3%	10%	–	8%	0%	5%	8%	3%	63%	–	0% (Note: Will Hurd with 0%)	–
Morning Consult	Sep 1–30, 2023	896 (LV)	–	0%	3%	14%	–	6%	0%	4%	9%	1%	61%	–	0% (Note: Will Hurd with 0%)	2%
Morning Consult	Aug 1–31, 2023	947 (LV)	–	0%	4%	15%	–	3%	1%	5%	10%	2%	59%	–	0% (Note: Will Hurd and Francis Suarez with 0%)	1%
Roanoke College	Aug 6–15, 2023	702 (A)	± 4.2%	–	3%	13%	1%	2%	1%	7%	5%	6%	47%	9%	6% (Note: "Someone else" with 6%)	2%
Morning Consult	July 1–31, 2023	1,044(LV)	–	0%	4%	20%	–	4%	0%	7%	7%	3%	55%	–	0% (Note: Francis Suarez with 0%)	–
Morning Consult	June 1–30, 2023	919 (LV)	–	0%	2%	19%	–	5%	0%	7%	3%	3%	60%	–	0% (Note: Liz Cheney, Kristi Noem, and Greg Abbott with 0%)	1%
Morning Consult	May 1–31, 2023	969 (LV)	–	–	–	21%	–	3%	0%	6%	3%	2%	59%	3%	3% (Note: Liz Cheney with 2%; Kristi Noem with 1%; Greg Abbott with 0%)	–
Roanoke College	May 14–23, 2023	678 (A)	± 4.4%	–	–	28%	1%	7%	1%	7%	–	1%	48%	–	3% (Note: Chris Sununu with 1%; "Someone else" with 2%)	4%
Morning Consult	Apr 1–30, 2023	870 (LV)	–	–	–	20%	–	3%	0%	6%	2%	1%	59%	6%	3% (Note: Liz Cheney with 2%; Kristi Noem, Greg Abbott and Mike Pompeo with 0%)	1%
Morning Consult	Mar 1–31, 2023	921 (LV)	–	–	–	26%	–	3%	–	6%	1%	0%	50%	9%	3% (Note: Liz Cheney with 2%; Kristi Noem with 1%; Greg Abbott and Mike Pompeo with 0%)	2%
Morning Consult	Feb 1–28, 2023	721 (LV)	–	–	–	31%	–	4%	–	6%	1%	1%	47%	9%	1% (Note: Liz Cheney with 1%; Ted Cruz, Kristi Noem, and Mike Pompeo with 0%)	–
Differentiators	Feb 21–24, 2023	500 (LV)	± 4.5%	–	–	37%	–	6%	–	3%	2%	–	34%	6%	7% (Note: Larry Hogan with 5%; Mike Pompeo with 2%)	5%
Differentiators	Feb 21–24, 2023	500 (LV)	± 4.5%	–	–	54%	–	–	–	–	–	–	37%	–	–	9%
Differentiators	Feb 21–24, 2023	500 (LV)	± 4.5%	–	–	65%	–	–	–	–	–	–	–	27%	–	8%
Differentiators	Feb 21–24, 2023	500 (LV)	± 4.5%	–	–	–	–	–	–	–	–	–	52%	42%	–	6%
Roanoke College	Feb 12–21, 2023	680 (A)	± 4.2%	–	–	28%	–	5%	–	3%	–	–	39%	6%	6% (Note: Donald Trump Jr. with 3%; Ted Cruz with 2%; Marco Rubio with 1%)	13%
Morning Consult	Jan 1–31, 2023	1,000 (LV)	–	–	–	32%	–	2%	–	10%	–	1%	43%	8%	2% (Note: Ted Cruz and Liz Cheney with 1%; Greg Abbott, Kristi Noem, and Mike Pompeo with 0%)	2%
Morning Consult	Dec 1–31, 2022	559 (LV)	–	–	–	30%	–	2%	–	11%	–	1%	45%	7%	5% (Note: Ted Cruz with 2%; Greg Abbott, Liz Cheney, Kristi Noem with 1%; Mike Pompeo with 0%)	–
Roanoke College	Nov 13–22, 2022	652 (A)	± 4.5%	–	–	–	–	–	–	–	–	–	52%	39%	–	7%
Roanoke College	Aug 7–16, 2022	640 (A)	± 4.5%	–	–	–	–	–	–	–	–	–	62%	28%	–	9%

== Georgia primary ==
States polled	Dates administered	Dates updated	Nikki Haley	Donald Trump	Other/ Undecided (Note: Calculated by taking the difference of 100% and all other candidates combined.)	Margin
FiveThirtyEight	through February 4, 2024	March 5, 2024	16.3%	81.1%	2.6%	Trump +64.8

Poll source	Date(s) administered	Sample size	Margin of error	Doug Burgum	Chris Christie	Ron DeSantis	Nikki Haley	Asa Hutchinson	Mike Pence	Vivek Ramaswamy	Tim Scott	Donald Trump	Other	Undecided
CNN/SSRS	Nov 30 – Dec 7, 2023	522 (LV)	± 3.3%	–	4%	17%	17%	1%	–	3%	–	55%	2% (Note: "Other" with 1%)	2%
CNN/SSRS	Nov 30 – Dec 7, 2023	522 (LV)	± 3.3%	–	37%	–	–	–	–	–	–	61%	–	2%
CNN/SSRS	Nov 30 – Dec 7, 2023	522 (LV)	± 3.3%	–	–	31%	–	–	–	–	–	69%	–	–
Morning Consult	Nov 1–30, 2023	1,477 (LV)	–	0%	2%	14%	10%	0%	–	6%	1%	66%	–	1%
Morning Consult	Oct 1–31, 2023	1,525 (LV)	–	0%	2%	15%	6%	0%	3%	8%	2%	63%	0% (Note: Will Hurd with 0%)	1%
Zogby Analytics	Oct 9–12, 2023	273 (LV)	± 3.9%	–	3%	10%	9%	–	5%	7%	5%	55%	–	6%
Morning Consult	Sep 1–30, 2023	1,452 (LV)	–	–	1%	15%	6%	1%	4%	10%	3%	61%	0% (Note: Will Hurd with 0%)	–
20/20 Insights	Sep 25–28, 2023	245 (LV)	± 6.3%	0%	4%	16%	7%	0%	4%	3%	2%	58%	–	6%
Morning Consult	Aug 1–31, 2023	1,599 (LV)	–	0%	1%	14%	4%	0%	5%	10%	3%	62%	0% (Note: Will Hurd and Francis Suarez with 0%)	1%
University of Georgia	Aug 16–23, 2023	807 (LV)	± 3.4%	0%	2%	15%	3%	0%	4%	3%	3%	57%	1% (Note: Francis Suarez with 1%; Will Hurd and Larry Elder with 0%)	14%
Morning Consult	July 1–31, 2023	1,633 (LV)	–	0%	1%	19%	3%	0%	6%	9%	3%	57%	1% (Note: Will Hurd with 1%; Francis Suarez with 0%)	1%
Morning Consult	June 1–30, 2023	1,599 (LV)	–	0%	2%	22%	3%	1%	6%	3%	3%	58%	0% (Note: Liz Cheney and Greg Abbott with 0%)	2%
Morning Consult	May 1–31, 2023	1,470 (LV)	–	–	–	21%	3%	0%	6%	3%	2%	61%	1% (Note: Liz Cheney with 1%; Greg Abbott, Glenn Youngkin, and Kristi Noem with 0%)	3%
Landmark Communications	May 14, 2023	800 (LV)	± 3.5%	–	2%	32%	6%	–	2%	2%	2%	40%	7% (Note: Brian Kemp with 7%)	6%
Morning Consult	Apr 1–30, 2023	1,403 (LV)	–	–	–	22%	4%	0%	7%	3%	2%	58%	4% (Note: Liz Cheney and Glenn Youngkin with 1%; Greg Abbott, Mike Pompeo, and Kristi Noem with 0%)	2%
University of Georgia	Apr 2–12, 2023	983 (LV)	± 3.1%	–	–	30%	4%	–	2%	–	1%	51%	3% (Note: Liz Cheney with 2%; Mike Pompeo with 1%)	7%
University of Georgia	Apr 2–12, 2023	983 (LV)	± 3.1%	–	–	41%	–	–	–	–	–	51%	–	-
Morning Consult	Mar 1–31, 2023	1,426 (LV)	–	–	–	29%	4%	–	8%	1%	1%	53%	3% (Note: Mike Pompeo, Liz Cheney, and Glenn Youngkin with 1%; Greg Abbott and Kristi Noem with 0%)	1%
Morning Consult	Feb 1–28, 2023	1,280 (LV)	–	–	–	32%	5%	–	7%	0%	2%	50%	4% (Note: Greg Abbott, Ted Cruz, Liz Cheney, and Glenn Youngkin with 1%; Mike Pompeo and Kristi Noem with 0%)	-
Morning Consult	Jan 1–31, 2023	1,714 (LV)	–	–	–	33%	3%	–	8%	–	1%	50%	6% (Note: Ted Cruz and Liz Cheney with 2%; and Mike Pompeo and Kristi Noem with 1%; Greg Abbott and Glenn Youngkin with 0%)	-
Morning Consult	Dec 1–31, 2022	972 (LV)	–	–	–	35%	3%	–	8%	–	1%	47%	3% (Note: Ted Cruz, Liz Cheney, and Mike Pompeo with 1%; Kristi Noem, Greg Abbott, and Glenn Youngkin with 0%)	3%
WPA Intelligence	Nov 11–13, 2022	843 (LV)	± 3.4%	–	–	55%	–	–	–	–	–	35%	–	10%
	Nov 8, 2022	2022 midterm elections												
Echelon Insights	Oct 31 – Nov 2, 2022	219 (LV)	± 5.4%	–	–	52%	–	–	–	–	–	36%	–	12%
Echelon Insights	Aug 31 – Sep 7, 2022	337 (LV)	± 4.4%	–	–	37%	–	–	–	–	–	54%	–	9%
Phillips Academy	Aug 3–7, 2022	371 (RV)	± 5.1%	–	–	29%	–	–	9%	–	–	54%	–	8%
John Bolton Super PAC	Jul 22–24, 2022	163 (LV)	–	–	5%	36%	–	–	6%	–	–	29%	16% (Note: Liz Cheney with 8%; Ted Cruz with 5%; Marco Rubio with 2%; Mike Pompeo with 1%)	19%
Spry Strategies	Apr 6–10, 2022	600 (LV)	± 4.0%	–	–	20%	6%	–	5%	–	1%	43%	11% (Note: Ted Cruz with 6%; Kristi Noem and Mike Pompeo with 2%)	15%
Spry Strategies	Apr 6–10, 2022	600 (LV)	± 4.0%	–	39%	6%	–	7%	–	2%	–	15% (Note: Ted Cruz with 9%; Mike Pompeo with 4%; Kristi Noem with 2%)	31%	
Trafalgar Group (R)	Mar 7–9, 2021	– (LV) (Note: Likely Republican primary voter subsample of 1,093 likely general election voters)	–	–	–	–	–	–	–	–	–	70%	18% (Note: "Would vote for anyone other than Trump" with 14%; would not vote with 4%)	12%
	Jan 20, 2021	Inauguration of Joe Biden												
University of Nevada/BUSR	Dec 30, 2020 – Jan 3, 2021	209 (LV)	± 7.0%	–	1%	–	3%	–	–	–	–	73%	12% (Note: Ted Cruz with 5%; Marco Rubio with 3%; Mitt Romney with 2%; "Other" with 2%)	–
University of Nevada/BUSR	Dec 30, 2020 – Jan 3, 2021	209 (LV)	± 7.0%	-	1%	–	8%	–	36%	–	–	–	31% (Note: Ted Cruz with 15%; Mitt Romney with 6%; Marco Rubio with 3%; "Other" with 7%)	24%

== Mississippi primary ==
Poll source	Date(s) administered	Sample size	Margin of error	Chris Christie	Ron DeSantis	Nikki Haley	Asa Hutchinson	Mike Pence	Vivek Ramaswamy	Tim Scott	Donald Trump	Other	Undecided
Mississippi Today/Siena College	Aug 20–28, 2023	650 (LV)	± 4.0%	6%	22%	3%	2%	2%	2%	2%	61%	2%	–
Mississippi Today/Siena College	Jan 8–12, 2023	487 (RV)	± 5.9%	–	39%	–	–	–	–	–	46%	3% (Note: "Someone else" with 3%)	11%
Echelon Insights	Aug 31 – Sep 7, 2022	211 (LV)	± 7.8%	–	31%	–	–	–	–	–	58%	11%	–

== Arizona primary ==
States polled	Dates administered	Dates updated	Nikki Haley	Donald Trump	Other/ Undecided (Note: Calculated by taking the difference of 100% and all other candidates combined.)	Margin
FiveThirtyEight	through February 4, 2024	March 5, 2024	19.9%	77.3%	2.8%	Trump +57.4

Poll source	Date(s) administered	Sample size	Margin of error	Chris Christie	Ron DeSantis	Nikki Haley	Asa Hutchinson	Mike Pence	Vivek Ramaswamy	Tim Scott	Donald Trump	Other	Undecided
Noble Predictive Insights	October 25–31, 2023	348 (RV)	± 5.25%	2%	16%	8%	0%	3%	9%	1%	53%	7% (Note: "Someone else not listed" & "None of these candidates" with 2%; Doug Burgum with 1%; Ryan Binkley, Larry Elder, Will Hurd, Perry Johnson & Francis Suarez with 0%)	–
Noble Predictive Insights	October 25–31, 2023	348 (RV)	± 5.25%	–	32%	–	–	–	–	–	68%	–	–
Emerson College	August 2–4, 2023	663 (LV)	± 3.7%	6%	11%	3%	0%	3%	4%	3%	58%	11% (Note: Doug Burgum and Will Hurd with 1%; Francis Suarez and Perry Johnson with 0%; "Someone else" with 9%)	1%
Noble Predictive Insights	July 13–17, 2023	346 (RV)	± 5.3%	2%	19%	4%	0%	5%	9%	2%	50%	7% (Note: Ryan Binkley, Doug Burgum, Francis Suarez, Larry Elder, Will Hurd, Perry Johnson, and "Someone Else not Listed" with 0%; "None of these Candidates" with 7%)	–
Noble Predictive Insights	July 13–17, 2023	346 (RV)	± 5.3%	–	38%	–	–	–	–	–	62%	–	–
J.L. Partners	Apr 10–12, 2023	550 (LV)	± 4.2%	–	24%	3%	0%	4%	2%	1%	47%	8% (Note: Liz Cheney with 4%; Mike Pompeo and Glenn Youngkin with 1%; "Someone else" with 2%)	11%
J.L. Partners	Apr 10–12, 2023	550 (LV)	± 4.2%	–	35%	–	–	–	–	–	52%	–	13%
Noble Predictive Insights	Apr 4–11, 2023	371 (RV)	± 5.1%	–	21%	4%	–	7%	–	0%	49%	20% (Note: Liz Cheney with 4%; Marco Rubio with 3%; Mike Pompeo, Chris Sununu, and Larry Hogan with 1%; Glenn Youngkin with 0%; "Someone else" with 1%; "None of these Candidates" with 9%)	–
Noble Predictive Insights	Apr 4–11, 2023	371 (RV)	± 5.1%	–	41%	–	–	–	–	–	59%	–	–
Rasmussen Reports	Mar 13–14, 2023	–	–	–	24%	–	–	–	–	–	52%	–	24%
OH Predictive Insights	Jan 31 – Feb 9, 2023	350 (RV)	± 5.2%	1%	26%	5%	–	8%	–	–	42%	11% (Note: Liz Cheney with 5%; Ted Cruz with 3%; Mike Pompeo with 2%; Marco Rubio with 1%; Kristi Noem and Glenn Youngkin with 0%)	7%
Blueprint Polling	Jan 5–8, 2023	303 (V)	–	–	34%	–	–	–	–	–	43%	–	23%
Echelon Insights	Aug 31 – Sep 7, 2022	337 (LV)	± 4.5%	–	36%	–	–	–	–	–	53%	–	11%
OH Predictive Insights	Nov 1–8, 2021	252 (RV)	± 6.2%	1%	16%	6%	–	9%	–	–	48%	9% (Note: Ted Cruz and Mitt Romney with 3%; Marco Rubio with 2%; Liz Cheney with 1%)	9%
OH Predictive Insights	Nov 1–8, 2021	252 (RV)	± 6.2%	0%	29%	8%	–	21%	–	–	–	25% (Note: Ted Cruz with 10%; Donald Trump Jr. with 8%; Mitt Romney with 4%; Marco Rubio with 2%; Liz Cheney with 1%)	16%

== Florida primary ==
Aggregate polls

Source of poll aggregation	Dates administered	Dates updated	Nikki Haley	Donald Trump	Other/ Undecided (Note: Calculated by taking the difference of 100% and all other candidates combined.)	Margin
FiveThirtyEight	through February 4, 2024	February 10, 2024	14.1%	84.2%	1.7%	Trump +70.1

Poll source	Date(s) administered	Sample size	Margin of error	Chris Christie	Ron DeSantis	Nikki Haley	Asa Hutchinson	Mike Pence	Vivek Ramaswamy	Tim Scott	Donald Trump	Others	Undecided
Victory Insights	Dec 8–9, 2023	1,220 (LV)	± 2.9%	5.3%	18.8%	7.6%	–	–	1.3%	–	59.5%	2.7%	4.8%
Victory Insights	Dec 8–9, 2023	1,220 (LV)	± 2.9%	–	25.8%	–	–	–	–	–	56.8%	–	17.4%
Florida Atlantic University; Political Communication & Public Opinion Research Lab/ Mainstreet Research	Oct 27 – November 11, 2023	400 (RV)	–	1%	20%	9%	–	–	0%	–	61%	2% (Note: Other with 2%; Doug Burgum with <1%)	6%
Florida Atlantic University; Political Communication & Public Opinion Research Lab/ Mainstreet Research	Oct 27 – November 11, 2023	400 (RV)	–	–	30%	–	–	–	–	–	63%	–	7%
University of North Florida	Oct 23 – November 4, 2023	788 (LV)	± 3.77%	2%	21%	6%	<1%	1%	1%	<1%	60%	<2% (Note: "Someone else" with 1%; Doug Burgum with <1%)	8%
University of North Florida	Oct 23 – November 4, 2023	788 (LV)	± 3.77%	–	29%	–	–	–	–	–	59%	–	12%
Fabrizio, Lee & Associates	Oct 1–2, 2023	500 (LV)	–	2%	22%	7%	–	1%	1%	1%	57%	0%	7%
Victory Insights	Aug 21–23, 2023	590 (LV)	± 4.3%	4%	23%	2%	2%	1%	3%	1%	59%	1%	7%
Victory Insights	Aug 21–23, 2023	590 (LV)	± 4.3%	–	30%	–	–	–	–	–	57%	–	13%
Florida Atlantic University	Jun 27 – July 1, 2023	315 (RV)	–	2%	30%	1%	2%	2%	4%	3%	50%	–	7%
Florida Atlantic University	Jun 27 – July 1, 2023	315 (RV)	–	–	37%	–	–	–	–	–	54%	–	8%
Breakthrough Research/Sachs Media	Jun 9–11, 2023	–	–	2%	41%	2%	0%	3%	2%	0%	41%	0% (Note: Elder with 0%)	8%
Victory Insights	May 25–27, 2023	700 (LV)	± 3.9%	–	38%	3%	–	3%	0%	3%	38%	4% (Note: Someone else with 4%)	12%
Victory Insights	May 25–27, 2023	700 (LV)	± 3.9%	–	40%	–	–	–	–	–	39%	–	21%
National Research (Note: Poll sponsored by American Greatness, which supports Trump)	May 8–9, 2023	500 (LV)	± 4.4%	–	34%	2%	0%	2%	2%	1%	42%	1% (Note: Chris Sununu with 1%)	16%
Florida Atlantic University	Apr 13–14, 2023	1,081 (RV)	± 3.0%	–	31%	–	–	–	–	–	59%	–	–
Victory Insights	Apr 6–8, 2023	1,000 (LV)	± 3.1%	–	35%	3%	1%	–	4%	–	43%	–	14%
Victory Insights	Apr 6–8, 2023	1,000 (LV)	± 3.1%	–	32%	–	–	–	–	–	47%	–	22%
Emerson College	Mar 13–15, 2023	1,153 (RV)	± 2.8%	–	44%	2%	–	4%	–	1%	47%	3% (Note: Someone else with 2%; Mike Pompeo with 1%)	–
University of North Florida	Feb 25 – March 7, 2023	550 (RV)	± 2.6%	–	59%	–	–	–	–	–	28%	–	13%
University of North Florida	Feb 25 – March 7, 2023	550 (RV)	± 2.6%	–	52%	4%	–	2%	–	0%	27%	4% (Note: Liz Cheney with 3%; Ted Cruz with 1%; Kristi Noem, Mike Pompeo, Chris Sununu with 0%)	11%
Victory Insights	Nov 16–17, 2022	700 (LV)	± 3.7%	–	47%	–	–	–	–	–	37%	–	10%
WPA Intelligence (Note: Poll sponsored by Club for Growth Action)	Nov 11–13, 2022	1,044 (LV)	–	–	56%	–	–	–	–	–	30%	–	14%
	November 8, 2022	2022 midterm elections											
Victory Insights	Oct 30 – November 1, 2022	229 (LV)	± 4.8%	–	50%	–	–	–	–	–	50%	–	–
Suffolk University	Sep 15–18, 2022	174 (LV)	–	–	48%	–	–	–	–	–	40%	–	12%
Echelon Insights	Aug 31 – September 7, 2022	363 (LV)	± 4.3%	–	45%	–	–	–	–	–	47%	–	8%
University of North Florida	Aug 8–12, 2022	671 (RV)	± 3.4%	–	47%	–	–	–	–	–	45%	–	8%
WPA Intelligence	Aug 7–10, 2022	1,000 (LV)	–	–	49%	–	–	–	–	–	42%	–	9%
Victory Insights	Jul 13–14, 2022	600 (RV)	± 4.1%	–	61%	–	–	–	–	–	39%	–	0%
Blueprint Polling (D)	Jul 7–10, 2022	656 (V)	± 3.8%	–	51%	–	–	–	–	–	39%	–	10%
Bendixen/Amandi International	March 2022	–	–	–	32%	–	–	–	–	–	55%	–	13%
University of North Florida	Feb 7–20, 2022	259 (RV)	–	–	44%	–	–	–	–	–	41%	–	15%
Suffolk University	Jan 26–29, 2022	176 (LV)	–	–	40%	–	–	–	–	–	47%	–	13%
Victory Insights	Sep 16–18, 2021	200 (LV)	–	–	30%	–	–	–	–	–	58%	–	12%
Susquehanna Polling & Research (R)	Aug 4–10, 2021	280 (RV)	–	1%	34%	3%	–	–	–	–	43%	10% (Note: Mitt Romney with 5%; Marco Rubio with 3%; Ted Cruz with 2%)	8%
Fabrizio, Lee & Associates	Feb 15–17, 2021	304 (LV)	–	–	64%	–	–	–	–	–	–	22% (Note: Marco Rubio with 12%; Rick Scott with 10%)	14%
	January 20, 2021	Inauguration of Joe Biden											
	November 3, 2020	2020 presidential election											
Fabrizio, Lee & Associates	July 16–18, 2019	280 (LV)	–	–	37%	–	–	–	–	–	–	44% (Note: Marco Rubio with 26%; Rick Scott with 18%)	19%

== Illinois primary ==
Poll source	Date(s) administered	Sample size	Margin of error	Chris Christie	Ron DeSantis	Nikki Haley	Mike Pence	Vivek Ramaswamy	Tim Scott	Donald Trump	Other	Undecided
Cor Strategies	Aug 24–27, 2023	–	–	6%	10%	6%	5%	5%	2%	53%	2% (Note: Doug Burgum and Asa Hutchinson with 1%; "Another candidate" with 0%)	9%
Cor Strategies	Aug 24–27, 2023	–	–	6%	26%	10%	10%	16%	9%	–	8% (Note: Doug Burgum with 3%; Asa Hutchinson with 1%; "Another candidate" with 4%)	16%
Public Policy Polling	Jun 6–7, 2022	677 (LV)	–	2%	23%	3%	6%	–	2%	51%	5% (Note: Ted Cruz with 4%; Marco Rubio with 1%; Josh Hawley with 0%)	8%

== Kansas caucus ==
Poll source	Date(s) administered	Sample size	Ron DeSantis	Nikki Haley	Mike Pence	Donald Trump	Other	Undecided
Remington Research	Feb 15–16, 2023	1,010 (LV)	41%	–	–	33%	–	26%
Remington Research	Feb 15–16, 2023	1,010 (LV)	17%	9%	9%	30%	9% (Note: Mike Pompeo with 9%)	19%
Echelon Insights	Aug 31 – Sep 7, 2022	192 (LV)	37%	–	–	52%	–	11%

== Ohio primary ==
Poll source	Date(s) administered	Sample size	Margin of error	Chris Christie	Ron DeSantis	Nikki Haley	Asa Hutchinson	Mike Pence	Vivek Ramaswamy	Tim Scott	Donald Trump	Other	Undecided
McLaughlin & Associates (R)	Dec 12–14, 2023	600 (LV)	± 4.0%	6%	11%	15%	–	–	3%	–	61%	–	4%
Morning Consult	Nov 1–30, 2023	1,881 (LV)	–	3%	11%	8%	0%	–	6%	1%	69%	0% (Note: Doug Burgum with 0%)	2%
Emerson College/Nexstar, WJW (Cleveland)	Nov 10–13, 2023	468 (LV)	± 4.5%	2%	8%	10%	1%	–	6%	1%	62%	1% (Note: Doug Burgum with 1%)	10%
Morning Consult	Oct 1–31, 2023	1,893(LV)	–	2%	13%	7%	0%	5%	8%	2%	62%	0% (Note: Doug Burgum and Will Hurd with 0%)	1%
Ohio Northern University	Oct 16–19, 2023	269 (LV)	± 2.15%	1%	10%	5%	0%	4%	9%	–	64%	1% (Note: Some Other Candidate at 1%)	6%
Morning Consult	Sep 1–30, 2023	1,621(LV)	–	3%	14%	5%	0%	5%	11%	2%	60%	0%	–
Morning Consult	Aug 1–31, 2023	1,803(LV)	–	3%	12%	3%	0%	7%	10%	3%	61%	1% (Note: Will Hurd with 1%; Doug Burgum and Francis Saurez with 0%)	–
Morning Consult	July 1–31, 2023	1,835(LV)	–	3%	16%	2%	0%	8%	9%	3%	58%	0% (Note: Doug Burgum, Will Hurd and Francis Suarez with 0%)	1%
Ohio Northern University	Jul 17–26, 2023	675 (RV)	± 3.7%	2%	9%	3%	1%	6%	12%	5%	64%	1%	3%
Suffolk University	Jul 9–12, 2023	190 (RV)	–	4%	23%	2%	2%	4%	2%	5%	48%	3% (Note: Larry Elder, Will Hurd and Perry Johnson with 1%; Ryan Binkley, Doug Burgum and Francis Suarez with 0%)	8%
Morning Consult	June 1–30, 2023	1,711(LV)	–	2%	19%	3%	1%	7%	5%	3%	59%	1% (Note: Greg Abbott, Doug Burgum, Liz Cheney, Will Hurd, Kristi Noem, and Francis Saurez with 0%)	1%
East Carolina University	Jun 21–24, 2023	405 (RV)	± 4.0%	4%	15%	2%	1%	5%	3%	–	59%	2%	10%
Morning Consult	May 1–31, 2023	1,792(LV)	–	–	20%	3%	0%	7%	5%	2%	60%	3% (Note: Liz Cheney with 2%; Kristi Noem with 1%; Greg Abbott with 0%)	–
Morning Consult	Apr 1–30, 2023	1,754(LV)	–	–	21%	2%	0%	8%	2%	2%	61%	4% (Note: Liz Cheney with 2%; Mike Pompeo and Glenn Youngkin with 1%; Greg Abbott and Kristi Noem with 0%)	–
Morning Consult	Mar 1–31, 2023	1,827(LV)	–	–	27%	4%	–	7%	0%	1%	56%	3% (Note: Liz Cheney with 2%; Mike Pompeo with 1%; Greg Abbott, Kristi Noem, and Glenn Youngkin with 0%)	2%
Morning Consult	Feb 1–28, 2023	1,573(LV)	–	–	30%	4%	–	9%	0%	1%	50%	4% (Note: Liz Cheney with 2%; Ted Cruz and Mike Pompeo with 1%; Greg Abbott, Kristi Noem, and Glenn Youngkin with 0%)	2%
Morning Consult	Jan 1–31, 2023	2,095(LV)	–	–	31%	2%	–	9%	–	1%	50%	5% (Note: Liz Cheney and Ted Cruz with 2%; Mike Pompeo with 1%; Greg Abbott, Kristi Noem, and Glenn Youngkin with 0%)	2%
Morning Consult	Dec 1–31, 2022	1,188 (LV)	–	–	33%	2%	–	8%	–	1%	48%	5% (Note: Liz Cheney with 3%; Ted Cruz with 2%; Greg Abbott, Kristi Noem, Mike Pompeo, and Glenn Youngkin with 0%)	3%
Echelon Insights	Aug 31 – Sep 7, 2022	377 (LV)	± 4.3%	–	30%	–	–	–	–	–	58%	12%	–
John Bolton Super PAC	Jul 22–24, 2022	136 (LV)	–	2%	30%	–	–	9%	–	–	28%	16% (Note: Ted Cruz with 7%; Liz Cheney with 6%; Marco Rubio with 2%; Mike Pompeo with 1%)	13%

== Louisiana primary ==
Poll source	Date(s) administered	Sample size	Margin of error	Chris Christie	Ron DeSantis	Mike Pence	Vivek Ramaswamy	Tim Scott	Donald Trump	Other	Undecided
Emerson College	Aug 13–14, 2023	(LV)	–	1%	10%	2%	1%	1%	75%	0% (Note: Doug Burgum and Nikki Haley with 0%)	–
Echelon Insights	Aug 31 – Sep 7, 2022	242 (LV)	± 6.5%	–	29%	–	–	–	65%	–	6%

== New York primary ==
Poll source	Date(s) administered	Sample size	Margin of error	Chris Christie	Ron DeSantis	Nikki Haley	Asa Hutchinson	Mike Pence	Vivek Ramaswamy	Tim Scott	Donald Trump	Others	Undecided
Morning Consult	Nov 1–30, 2023	1,876 (LV)	–	4%	13%	8%	0%	–	5%	2%	66%	1% (Note: Doug Burgum with 1%)	1%
Morning Consult	Oct 1–31, 2023	2,014 (LV)	–	4%	12%	6%	0%	4%	7%	3%	64%	0% (Note: Doug Burgum and Will Hurd with 0%)	–
Morning Consult	Sep 1–30, 2023	1,924 (LV)	–	3%	14%	5%	1%	5%	8%	2%	62%	1% (Note: Doug Burgum with 1%; Will Hurd with 0%)	–
Siena College	Sep 10–13, 2023	804 (RV)	± 4.3%	–	–	–	–	–	–	–	64%	27%	8%
Morning Consult	Aug 1–31, 2023	2,006 (LV)	–	4%	14%	4%	0%	7%	10%	2%	57%	0% (Note: Doug Burgum, Will Hurd, and Francis Suarez with 0%)	2%
Siena College	Aug 13–16, 2023	803 (RV)	± 4.4%	–	–	–	–	–	–	–	63%	32%	5%
Morning Consult	July 1–31, 2023	1,886 (LV)	–	4%	18%	2%	0%	6%	8%	2%	58%	1% (Note: Will Hurd with 1%; Doug Burgum and Francis Suarez with 0%)	1%
Morning Consult	June 1–30, 2023	1,856(LV)	–	3%	17%	3%	1%	6%	4%	4%	60%	1% (Note: Liz Cheney with 1%; Doug Burgum, Will Hurd, and Kristi Noem with 0%)	1%
Siena College	Jun 20–25, 2023	817 (RV)	± 3.9%	–	–	–	–	–	–	–	61%	34%	5%
Morning Consult	May 1–31, 2023	1,932(LV)	–	–	17%	3%	1%	6%	4%	4%	63%	3% (Note: Liz Cheney with 2%; Kristi Noem with 1%; Greg Abbott and Glenn Youngkin with 0%)	–
Siena College	May 7–11, 2023	810 (RV)	± 4.1%	–	–	–	–	–	–	–	60%	32%	8%
Morning Consult	Apr 1–30, 2023	1,792(LV)	–	–	20%	3%	0%	6%	1%	3%	59%	7% (Note: Liz Cheney with 3%; Greg Abbott, Kristi Noem, Mike Pompeo, and Glenn Youngkin with 1%)	1%
Morning Consult	Mar 1–31, 2023	1,831(LV)	–	–	28%	4%	–	6%	0%	4%	51%	6% (Note: Liz Cheney with 3%; Greg Abbott, Kristi Noem, and Mike Pompeo with 1%; Glenn Youngkin with 0%)	1%
Siena College	Mar 19–22, 2023	802 (RV)	± 4.6%	–	27%	–	–	–	–	–	52%	18%	–
Morning Consult	Feb 1–28, 2023	1,410(LV)	–	–	28%	4%	–	8%	0%	2%	51%	6% (Note: Liz Cheney with 2%; Greg Abbott, Ted Cruz, Kristi Noem, and Mike Pompeo with 1%; Glenn Youngkin with 0%)	1%
Echelon Insights	Feb 21–23, 2023	600 (LV)	± 4.2%	–	45%	–	–	–	–	–	44%	–	13%
Morning Consult	Jan 1–31, 2023	1,871(LV)	–	–	34%	3%	–	9%	–	1%	46%	9% (Note: Liz Cheney with 3%; Ted Cruz and Kristi Noem with 2%; Mike Pompeo and Glenn Youngkin with 1%; Greg Abbott with 0%)	–
Morning Consult	Dec 1–31, 2022	1,074 (LV)	–	–	33%	3%	–	7%	–	3%	44%	9% (Note: Ted Cruz with 5%; Liz Cheney with 3%; Kristi Noem with 1%; Greg Abbott, Mike Pompeo and Glenn Youngkin with 0%)	1%

== Rhode Island primary ==
Poll source	Date(s) administered	Sample size	Margin of error	Ron DeSantis	Donald Trump	Other
Echelon Insights	Aug 31 – Sep 7, 2022	102 (LV)	± 6.1%	38%	54%	8%

== Wisconsin primary ==
Source of poll aggregation	Dates administered	Dates updated	Nikki Haley	Donald Trump	Other/ Undecided (Note: Calculated by taking the difference of 100% and all other candidates combined.)	Margin
270ToWin	February 7, 2024	February 15, 2024	22.5%	71.5%	6.0%	Trump +49.0
FiveThirtyEight	through February 4, 2024	February 15, 2024	21.1%	70.9%	8.0%	Trump +49.8

Poll source	Date(s) administered	Sample size	Margin of error	Doug Burgum	Chris Christie	Ron DeSantis	Nikki Haley	Asa Hutchinson	Mike Pence	Vivek Ramaswamy	Tim Scott	Donald Trump	Other	Undecided
Public Policy Polling (D)	Dec 11–12, 2023	503 (LV)	± 4.4%	–	5%	16%	15%	–	–	4%	–	54%	–	6%
Morning Consult	Nov 1–30, 2023	720 (LV)	–	1%	2%	17%	13%	1%	–	6%	2%	56%	–	2%
Marquette University Law School	October 26 – November 2, 2023	402 (RV)	± 6.8%	1%	1%	18%	11%	0%	6%	3%	1%	38%	0% (Note: Larry Elder with 0%)	24%
Morning Consult	Oct 1–31, 2023	713 (LV)	–	0%	3%	15%	12%	1%	4%	9%	3%	52%	–	1%
Morning Consult	Sep 1–30, 2023	665 (LV)	–	–	2%	16%	9%	1%	7%	11%	2%	50%	0% (Note: Will Hurd with 0%)	2%
Morning Consult	Aug 1–31, 2023	681 (LV)	–	–	3%	16%	6%	2%	8%	11%	5%	50%	0% (Note: Will Hurd with 0%)	–
Morning Consult	July 1–31, 2023	707 (LV)	–	0%	2%	25%	5%	1%	8%	8%	4%	46%	1% (Note: Will Hurd with 1%; Francis Suarez with 0%)	–
Morning Consult	June 1–30, 2023	666 (LV)	–	–	2%	24%	3%	0%	7%	6%	7%	51%	1% (Note: Liz Cheney with 1%; Greg Abbott with 0%)	–
Marquette Law School	June 8–13, 2023	419 (RV)	± 6.5%	0%	1%	30%	3%	0%	6%	3%	5%	31%	0% (Note: Larry Elder with <0.5%)	21%
Public Policy Polling	June 5–6, 2023	507 (LV)	± 4.4%	–	–	25%	5%	–	8%	2%	5%	41%	–	14%
Public Policy Polling	June 5–6, 2023	507 (LV)	± 4.4%	–	–	39%	–	–	–	–	–	43%	–	18%
Morning Consult	May 1–31, 2023	728 (LV)	–	–	–	24%	4%	0%	8%	5%	3%	52%	4% (Note: Liz Cheney with 3%; Kristi Noem with 1%; Glenn Youngkin with 0%)	–
Morning Consult	Apr 1–30, 2023	771 (LV)	–	–	–	31%	4%	0%	9%	2%	2%	45%	5% (Note: Liz Cheney with 4%; Mike Pompeo with 1%; Greg Abbott, Kristi Noem, and Glenn Youngkin with 0%)	2%
Morning Consult	Mar 1–31, 2023	722 (LV)	–	–	–	35%	6%	–	9%	1%	2%	43%	4% (Note: Liz Cheney with 2%; Mike Pompeo and Greg Abbott with 1%; Kristi Noem and Glenn Youngkin with 0%)	–
Morning Consult	Feb 1–28, 2023	626 (LV)	–	–	–	34%	4%	–	9%	0%	1%	44%	7% (Note: Liz Cheney with 4%; Ted Cruz, Mike Pompeo, and Greg Abbott with 1%; Kristi Noem and Glenn Youngkin with 0%)	1%
Morning Consult	Jan 1–31, 2023	897 (LV)	–	–	–	32%	2%	–	11%	–	2%	42%	10% (Note: Ted Cruz and Liz Cheney with 4%; Mike Pompeo and Greg Abbott with 1%; Kristi Noem and Glenn Youngkin with 0%)	1%
Morning Consult	Dec 1–31, 2022	558 (LV)	–	–	–	36%	4%	–	9%	–	1%	40%	8% (Note: Ted Cruz with 4%; Liz Cheney with 3%; Kristi Noem with 1%; Mike Pompeo and Greg Abbott with 0%)	2%

== Pennsylvania primary ==
Poll source	Date(s) administered	Sample size	Margin of error	Chris Christie	Ron DeSantis	Nikki Haley	Asa Hutchinson	Mike Pence	Vivek Ramaswamy	Tim Scott	Donald Trump	Other	Undecided
Quinnipiac University	Jan 4–8, 2024	651 (RV)	± 3.8%	6%	10%	14%	–	–	4%	–	61%	2% (Note: "Someone else" & "Wouldn't vote" with 1%)	3%
Morning Consult	Nov 1–30, 2023	2,056 (LV)	–	4%	14%	9%	0%	–	6%	1%	63%	0% (Note: Doug Burgum with 0%)	3%
Morning Consult	Oct 1–31, 2023	2,009 (LV)	–	4%	15%	7%	0%	6%	7%	1%	59%	0% (Note: Doug Burgum and Will Hurd with 0%)	1%
Franklin & Marshall College	Oct 11–22, 2023	359 (RV)	± 6.4%	4%	14%	9%	0%	2%	5%	3%	55%	2% (Note: "Someone else" with 2%; Doug Burgum, Will Hurd & Francis Suarez with 0%)	7%
Quinnipiac University	Sep 28 – Oct 2, 2023	711 (RV)	± 3.7%	4%	14%	8%	0%	4%	2%	1%	61%	3% (Note: Doug Burgum, "Wouldn't vote" & "Refused" with 1%; Larry Elder, Will Hurd with 0%)	3%
Morning Consult	Sep 1–30, 2023	1,910 (LV)	–	3%	14%	6%	0%	8%	8%	1%	58%	0% (Note: Doug Burgum and Will Hurd with 0%)	2%
Morning Consult	Aug 1–31, 2023	1,979 (LV)	–	4%	15%	3%	0%	8%	8%	2%	58%	0% (Note: Doug Burgum, Will Hurd, and Francis Suarez with 0%)	2%
Franklin & Marshall College	Aug 9–20, 2023	297 (RV)	± 7.0%	3%	21%	5%	1%	6%	9%	6%	39%	5% (Note: "Someone else" with 3%; Francis Suarez with 1%; Doug Burgum & Will Hurd with 0%)	8%
Morning Consult	July 1–31, 2023	2,139 (LV)	–	4%	20%	3%	0%	7%	7%	3%	55%	1% (Note: Francis Suarez with 1%; Doug Burgum, and Will Hurd with 0%)	–
Morning Consult	June 1–30, 2023	2,136 (LV)	–	3%	23%	3%	1%	9%	3%	3%	54%	1% (Note: Liz Cheney with 1%; Greg Abbott, Doug Burgum, and Kristi Noem with 0%)	–
Quinnipiac University	Jun 22–26, 2023	614 (RV)	± 4.0%	5%	25%	4%	–	5%	1%	4%	49%	–	6%
Morning Consult	May 1–31, 2023	2,062 (LV)	–	–	22%	4%	0%	7%	3%	2%	58%	4% (Note: Liz Cheney with 3%; Greg Abbott with 1%; Kristi Noem and Glenn Youngkin with 0%)	–
Morning Consult	Apr 1–30, 2023	2,058 (LV)	–	–	25%	3%	0%	9%	2%	2%	53%	6% (Note: Liz Cheney with 3%; Greg Abbott, Mike Pompeo, and Glenn Youngkin with 1%; Kristi Noem with 0%)	–
Franklin & Marshall College	Mar 27 – Apr 7, 2023	227 (RV)	± 4.9%	–	34%	4%	–	6%	–	0%	40%	6% (Note: Chris Sununu with 2%; Mike Pompeo with 0%; "Someone else" with 4%)	11%
Morning Consult	Mar 1–31, 2023	2,103 (LV)	–	–	30%	4%	–	8%	0%	1%	51%	4% (Note: Liz Cheney with 4%; Greg Abbott, Kristi Noem, Mike Pompeo, and Glenn Youngkin with 0%)	2%
Public Policy Polling	Mar 9–10, 2023	616 (LV)	–	–	31%	5%	–	5%	–	–	49%	–	10%
Public Policy Polling	Mar 9–10, 2023	616 (LV)	–	–	40%	–	–	–	–	–	48%	–	13%
Morning Consult	Feb 1–28, 2023	1,769 (LV)	–	–	32%	4%	–	8%	0%	1%	46%	8% (Note: Liz Cheney with 3%; Ted Cruz and Mike Pompeo with 2%; Greg Abbott with 1%; Kristi Noem and Glenn Youngkin with 0%)	1%
Susquehanna Polling & Research	Feb 19–26, 2023	320 (RV)	± 3.2%	–	37%	4%	–	2%	–	1%	32%	27% (Note: Ted Cruz with 2%; Mike Pompeo with 1%; Marco Rubio with 0%; "Someone else" with 24%)	–
Morning Consult	Jan 1–31, 2023	2,470 (LV)	–	–	35%	2%	–	10%	–	1%	43%	9% (Note: Liz Cheney with 4%; Ted Cruz with 2%; Greg Abbott, Kristi Noem, and Mike Pompeo with 1%; Glenn Youngkin with 0%)	–
Morning Consult	Dec 1–31, 2022	1,381 (LV)	–	–	34%	2%	–	10%	–	1%	44%	8% (Note: Liz Cheney with 4%; Ted Cruz with 3%; Greg Abbott with 1%; Kristi Noem, Mike Pompeo, and Glenn Youngkin with 0%)	1%
Communication Concepts	Nov 19–21, 2022	639 (RV)	± 3.9%	–	45%	–	–	–	–	–	40%	4%	12%
Echelon Insights	Aug 31 – Sep 7, 2022	353 (LV)	–	–	40%	–	–	–	–	–	48%	12%	–
John Bolton Super PAC	Jul 22–24, 2022	129 (LV)	–	2%	29%	–	–	7%	–	–	40%	10% (Note: Liz Cheney with 6%; Ted Cruz, Marco Rubio with 2%; Mike Pompeo with 0%; "Someone else" with 12%)	–

== Indiana primary ==
Poll source	Date(s) administered	Sample size	Margin of error	Ron DeSantis	Nikki Haley	Mike Pence	Donald Trump	Other	Undecided
Bellwether Research & Consulting	Dec 11–17, 2022	457 (LV)	–	28%	3%	13%	39%	1% (Note: Mike Pompeo with 1%)	15%

== Maryland primary ==
Poll source	Date(s) administered	Sample size	Margin of error	Ron DeSantis	Nikki Haley	Larry Hogan	Mike Pence	Tim Scott	Donald Trump	Other	Undecided
OpinionWorks	April 7–10, 2024	451 (LV)	± 4.6%	–	18%	–	–	–	74%	-	7%
Gonzales Research	May 30 – Jun 6, 2023	221 (LV)	± 3.5%	37%	-	-	-	-	42%	-	21%
co/efficient	Feb 19–20, 2023	1,007 (LV)	± 3.58%	27%	6%	18%	1%	1%	33%	2% (Note: Mike Pompeo with 2%)	12%
co/efficient	Feb 19–20, 2023	1,007 (LV)	± 3.58%	–	–	32%	–	–	59%	–	10%
co/efficient	Feb 19–20, 2023	1,007 (LV)	± 3.58%	39%	–	–	–	–	35%	–	26%
OpinionWorks	May 27 – Jun 2, 2022	428 (LV)	± 4.7%	12%	5%	25%	6%	–	48%	–	–

== West Virginia primary ==
Poll source	Date(s) administered	Sample size	Margin of error	Ron DeSantis	Nikki Haley	Asa Hutchinson	Mike Pence	Vivek Ramaswamy	Tim Scott	Donald Trump	Other	Undecided
ECU Center for Survey Research	May 22–23, 2023	957 (RV)	± 3.7%	9%	3%	2%	5%	2%	4%	54%	–	20%

== Kentucky caucus ==
Poll source	Date(s) administered	Sample size	Margin of error	Chris Christie	Ron DeSantis	Nikki Haley	Asa Hutchinson	Mike Pence	Vivek Ramaswamy	Tim Scott	Donald Trump	Other	Undecided
Emerson College	May 10–12, 2023	500 (LV)	± 4.3%	2%	14%	3%	0%	4%	3%	1%	70%	3% (Note: Chris Sununu with 0%; "Someone else" with 3%)	–
Emerson College	Apr 10–11, 2023	900 (LV)	± 3.0%	–	23%	4%	1%	4%	–	1%	62%	6% (Note: Kristi Noem with 1%; "Someone else" with 5%)	–

== Montana primary ==
Poll source	Date(s) administered	Sample size	Margin of error	Chris Christie	Ron DeSantis	Nikki Haley	Mike Pence	Vivek Ramaswamy	Tim Scott	Donald Trump	Other	Undecided
Fabrizio, Lee & Associates	Oct 23–25, 2023	600 (LV)	± 4.0%	2%	12%	7%	3%	3%	1%	64%	2% (Note: "Doug Burgum & Asa Hutchinson with 1%; Larry Elder with 0%)	6%
J.L. Partners	Aug 12–17, 2023	418 (LV)	?	3%	15%	3%	2%	6%	3%	52%	3% (Note: "Someone else" with 2%; Doug Burgum with 1%; Larry Elder, Asa Hutchinson & Francis Suarez with 0%)	12%
J.L. Partners	Aug 12–17, 2023	418 (LV)	?	–	29%	–	–	–	–	56%	–	15%
Public Policy Polling (D)	Jun 19–20, 2023	510 (LV)	± 4.3%	4%	23%	5%	5%	3%	2%	46%	–	12%
Public Policy Polling (D)	Jun 19–20, 2023	510 (LV)	± 4.3%	–	37%	–	–	–	–	49%	–	14%
Echelon Insights	Aug 31 – Sep 7, 2022	142 (LV)	± 6.6%	–	28%	–	–	–	–	56%	–	16%

== See also ==
- Nationwide opinion polling for the 2024 Republican Party presidential primaries
- 2024 Republican National Convention
- Nationwide opinion polling for the 2024 United States presidential election
- Statewide opinion polling for the 2024 United States presidential election

== Notes ==
Partisan clients
