= Jack Citrin =

- Born: Shanghai, China
- Education: McGill University; University of California, Berkeley
- Occupation: Political scientist
- Employer(s): University of California, Berkeley
- Spouse: Leland Rubin 1964-1969 Bonnie McKellar 1972-
- Children: Sarah Citrin

Jack Citrin is an American political scientist. He is the director of the Institute of Governmental Studies and a professor emeritus of Political Science at the University of California, Berkeley. He is the co-author and co-editor of several books about national identity and tax resistance.

== Early life ==
Citrin was born in Shanghai, and he grew up in Hong Kong and Tokyo, Japan. He is of Russian-Jewish descent. He graduated from McGill University, and he earned a PhD from the University of California, Berkeley.

== Career ==
Citrin is a professor emeritus of Political Science at the University of California, Berkeley. He has served as the director of the Institute of Governmental Studies since 2007.

Citrin is the (co-)author and (co-) editor of several books about national identity and tax resistance, including two with David O. Sears. Their first book together, Tax Revolt: Something for Nothing in California, published in 1982, was an analysis of the 1978 California Proposition 13. In a review for Political Science Quarterly, Alvin Rabushka suggested, "the book says virtually nothing about the effects of Proposition 13 on the state's economy, its public services, or its political and judicial processes." He added that "their obsession with symbolic racism is wholly unwarranted, both analytically and from a public policy perspective," and he concluded by dismissing the book as "hard to read, because it is written in the language of social psychology and social science jargon."

In American Identity and the Politics of Multiculturalism, published in 2014, Citrin and Sears studied multiculturalism in relation to civic nationalism versus nativism and patriotism versus chauvinism, and found that most American citizens were patriotic civic nationalists. In a review for Contemporary Sociology, Rhys H. Williams concluded, "This is an optimistic book for those who share a liberal conception of American national identity, culture, and public life" and he added that "they recognize how those most disadvantaged by our current political economy, most specifically African Americans, are at least "on board" with rosy assessments of the nation." However, in a 2017 interview, Citrin admitted that this may have changed due to the "hardening of differences in the political parties."

== Personal life ==
Citrin married Leland Rubin in 1964. He is a naturalized U.S. citizen.

== Selected works ==
- Sears, David O.; Citrin, Jack (1982). Tax Revolt: Something for Nothing in California. Cambridge, Massachusetts: Harvard University Press. ISBN 9780674868359. OCLC 300556411.
- Persily, Nathaniel; Citrin, Jack; Egan, Patrick J., eds. (2008). Public Opinion and Constitutional Controversy. New York: Oxford University Press. ISBN 9780199851720. OCLC 776942343.
- Citrin, Jack; Martin, Isaac William, eds. (2009). After the Tax Revolt: Proposition 13 Turns 30. Berkeley, California: Berkeley Public Policy Press. ISBN 9780877724308. OCLC 837096318.
- Citrin, Jack; Karol, David, eds. (2009). Nominating the President: Evolution and Revolution in 2008 and Beyond. Lanham, Maryland: Rowman & Littlefield Publishers. ISBN 9780742566378. OCLC 318875723.
- Citrin, Jack; Sears, David O. (2014). American Identity and the Politics of Multiculturalism. New York: Cambridge University Press. ISBN 9780521828833. OCLC 874732617.
