= Institute of Governmental Studies =

American university research unit

The Institute of Governmental Studies (IGS) is an interdisciplinary organized research unit at UC Berkeley, in Philosophy Hall. It was founded in 1919 as the Bureau of Public Administration. IGS and its affiliated centers spearhead and promote research, programs, seminars and colloquia, training, educational activities and public service in the fields of politics and public policy, with a strong focus on national and California politics. Current IGS research focuses include institutional policy and design, political reform, term limits, campaign finance, redistricting, direct democracy, presidential and gubernatorial politics, representative government, the politics of race and ethnicity, immigration and globalization.

== Faculty ==
IGS has an active interdisciplinary core faculty that draws from several schools and departments. In addition to political science, those disciplines include sociology, public policy, law, business, and history. The core faculty have published widely on many topics within the areas of institutional design, policy and politics. In addition, several of them have extensive experience working with governments, the media, and public commissions, adding a practical perspective to their work on institutional design and reform issues.

== Research ==
IGS organizes and funds research in the areas of institutional design and reform. The Constitutional Revision and Blanket Primary projects drew together scholars from across the UC system and in several disciplines to analyze important contemporary institutional issues, such as how the California Constitution should be reformed and the impact of change in primary rules on the political system. In addition, IGS sponsors seminars on various topics in the social sciences, such as game theory and political history.

== Resources and facilities ==
As part of IGS's mission to facilitate and disseminate research, the IGS Library hosts a collection of fugitive research materials. The library answers thousands of public queries annually and launched a 2.0 website that has received much acclaim for its ability to break down state propositions in a clear and accessible manner.

IGS Press is a small press publisher and has entered into more formal collaborations with the University of California Press and other campus social science units. The Institute publishes an occasional magazine called The Public Affairs Report and the e-journal California Journal of Politics and Policy.

== Public service ==
In addition to conferences and seminars, IGS regularly hosts visits by public officials to the campus and provides outreach to state government leaders.

== IGS directors ==
Samuel C. May: 1921–1955

Milton Chernin (acting director): 1955–1958

Dwight Waldo: 1958–1967

Eugene C. Lee: 1967–1988

Nelson W. Polsby: 1988–1999

Bruce E. Cain: 1999–2007

Jack Citrin: 2007–2017

Lisa García Bedolla: 2017–2019

G. Cristina Mora and Eric Schickler: 2019–present
