= Results of the 2024 Republican Party presidential primaries =

This article contains the results of the 2024 Republican Party presidential primaries and caucuses, the processes by which the Republican Party selects delegates to attend the 2024 Republican National Convention. The series of primaries, caucuses, and state conventions culminate in the national convention, where the delegates cast their votes to formally select a candidate. A simple majority of the total delegate votes is required to become the nominee.

Candidates started being placed on primary ballots the previous October, and by the end of December 2023, most of these had been finalized. Seven candidates, Donald Trump, Nikki Haley, Ron DeSantis, Ryan Binkley, Chris Christie, Vivek Ramaswamy and Asa Hutchinson, appear on the ballot in most states. Delegates won by some who suspend, rather formally withdraw their candidacies, will attend the convention as unpledged delegates.

== Overview of results ==
Popular Vote

Republican primary results
Party	Candidate	Votes	%
Republican	Donald Trump	17,015,756	76.42%
Republican	Nikki Haley	4,381,799	19.68%
Republican	Ron DeSantis	353,615	1.59%
N/A	Uncommitted	154,815	0.70%
Republican	Chris Christie	139,541	0.63%
Republican	Vivek Ramaswamy	96,954	0.44%
Republican	Asa Hutchinson	22,044	0.10%
Republican	Perry Johnson	4,051	0.02%
Republican	Tim Scott	1,598	0.01%
Republican	Doug Burgum	502	0.00%
Republican	Mike Pence	404	0.00%
N/A	Other candidates	93,796	0.42%
Total votes		22,264,875	100.00%

Map legend
Nikki Haley
Donald Trump
Winner not yet declared
None of These Candidates

First-place winners of each state

== Major candidates ==
Legend:	1st place (popular vote)	2nd place (popular vote)	3rd place (popular vote)	Candidate has withdrawn	Candidate unable to appear on ballot

Date (daily totals)	Delegates	Contest	Donald Trump	Nikki Haley (withdrawn)	Ryan Binkley (withdrawn)	Ron DeSantis (withdrawn)	Vivek Ramaswamy (withdrawn)	Asa Hutchinson (withdrawn)	Other
Cancelled	16	Delaware (Note: Pursuant to Delaware State Law, if only one Presidential Candidate, and no other candidates file for the ballot, the state run presidential primary shall be cancelled.)	16 delegates (Note: Delegates have not been officially bound yet.)	Primary cancelled					
Cancelled	29	South Dakota	29 delegates	Primary cancelled					
January 15	40	Iowa	51.0% 20 delegates 56,243 votes	19.1% 8 delegates 21,027 votes	0.7% 768 votes	21.3% 9 delegates 23,491 votes	7.6% 3 delegates 8,430 votes	0.2% 188 votes	0.1% (Note: Includes: <0.1% for Chris Christie (35 votes); 0.1% for candidates not on the ballot (90 votes)); 125 votes
January 23	22	New Hampshire	54.3% 13 delegates 176,391 votes	43.3% 9 delegates 140,491 votes	0.1% 315 votes	0.7% 2,241 votes	0.3% 833 votes	<0.1% 108 votes	1.3% 4,196 votes
February 6	0	Nevada (primary)	Not on ballot	30.6% 24,583 votes	Not on ballot	Not on ballot (withdrawn)			69.4% (Note: Includes: 63.3% for "None of These Candidates" (50,763 votes); 3.9% for Mike Pence (withdrawn, 3,091 votes); 1.3% for Tim Scott (withdrawn, 1,081 votes); 0.9% for other on-ballot candidates (731 votes)); 55,666 votes
February 8 (30)	26	Nevada (caucus)	99.1% 26 delegates 59,982 votes	Not on ballot	0.9% 540 votes	Not on ballot (withdrawn)			Not on ballot
February 8 (30)	4	Virgin Islands (Note: The U.S. Virgin Islands was stripped five of its delegates for scheduling its caucus before March 1.)	First Ballot: 69.5% 180 votes Final Ballot: 74.2% 4 delegates 187 votes	First Ballot: 20.1% 52 votes Final Ballot: 25.8% 65 votes	Not on ballot	First Ballot: 5.8% 15 votes Final Ballot: 0.0% 0 votes	First Ballot: 1.2% 3 votes Final Ballot: 0.0% 0 votes	Not on ballot (withdrawn)	First Ballot: 3.5% 9 votes (Note: Includes: 2.4% for Perry Johnson (withdrawn, 6 votes); 1.2% for Chris Christie (withdrawn, 3 votes)); Final Ballot: 0.0% 0 votes
February 24	50	South Carolina	59.8% 47 delegates 452,496 votes	39.5% 3 delegates 299,084 votes	0.1% 528 votes	0.4% 2,953 votes	0.1% 726 votes	Not on ballot (withdrawn)	0.1% 1,019 votes (Note: Includes: 0.1% for Chris Christie (withdrawn, 658 votes); <0.1% for David Stuckenberg (361 votes))
February 27	16	Michigan (primary)	68.1% 12 delegates 761,163 votes	26.6% 4 delegates 297,124 votes	0.2% 2,348 votes	1.2% 13,456 votes	0.3% 3,702 votes	0.1% 1,077 votes	3.4% 38,443 votes (Note: Includes: 3.0% for Uncommitted (33,649 votes); 0.4% for Chris Christie (withdrawn, 4,794 votes))
March 2 (125)	39	Michigan (caucus)	97.8% 39 delegates 1,575 votes	2.2% 36 votes	Not on ballot (withdrawn)				Not on ballot
March 2 (125)	32	Idaho	84.9% 32 delegates 33,603 votes	13.2% 5,221 votes	0.1% 40 votes	1.3% 534 votes	0.2% 95 votes	Not on ballot (withdrawn)	0.2% 91 votes (Note: Includes: 0.2% for Chris Christie (withdrawn, 91 votes))
March 2 (125)	54	Missouri (Note: The number of pledged delegates won is determined by the number of state delegates won.) (Note: The number of pledged national convention delegates is calculated through the number of state delegates won, however, a candidate must get both at least 15% of the total vote to get statewide delegates and at least 15% of the vote in a congressional district to get district delegates from that district. Each precinct has a certain number of state delegates and allocates them based on how many caucus goers there are for each candidate at that precinct.)	N/A (Note: The Missouri Republican Party has only released the state delegate results instead of the popular vote.); 54 delegates 924 state delegates	N/A; 0 state delegates	Not on ballot (withdrawn)				0.0% 0 state delegates (Note: Includes: 0.0% for David Stuckenberg (0 state delegates))
March 1–3	19	Washington, D.C.	33.3% 676 votes	62.8% 19 delegates 1,274 votes	nil% 1 vote	1.9% 38 votes	0.7% 15 votes	Not on ballot (withdrawn)	1.3% (Note: Includes: 0.9% for Chris Christie (18 votes); 0.4% for David Stuckenberg (8 votes)); 26 votes
March 4	29	North Dakota	84.4% 29 delegates 1,632 votes	14.1% 273 votes	0.5% 9 votes	Not on ballot (withdrawn)			1.0% (Note: Includes: 1.0% for David Stuckenberg (19 votes)); 19 votes
March 5 (Super Tuesday) (865)	49	Alabama	83.2% 50 delegates 499,147 votes	13.0% 77,989 votes	0.1% 509 votes	1.4% 8,452 votes	0.3% 1,864 votes	Not on ballot (withdrawn)	2.0% 12,001 votes (Note: Includes: 1.6% for No Uncommitted (9,807 votes); 0.2% for Chris Christie (withdrawn, 1,442 votes); 0.1% for David Stuckenberg (752 votes))
March 5 (Super Tuesday) (865)	28	Alaska	87.6% 29 delegates 9,243 votes	12.0% 1,266 votes	Not on ballot (withdrawn)		0.4% 45 votes	Not on ballot (withdrawn)	Not on ballot
March 5 (Super Tuesday) (865)	40	Arkansas	76.9% 39 delegates 204,898 votes	18.4% 1 delegate 49,085 votes	0.1% 183 votes	1.2% 3,162 votes	0.3% 860 votes	2.8% 7,377 votes	0.3% 908 votes (Note: Includes: 0.2% for Chris Christie (withdrawn, 600 votes); 0.1% for Doug Burgum (withdrawn, 157 votes); 0.1% for David Stuckenberg (151 votes))
March 5 (Super Tuesday) (865)	169	California	79.3% 169 delegates 1,962,905 votes	17.4% 431,876 votes	0.1% 3,577 votes	1.4% 35,717 votes	0.5% 11,113 votes	0.1% 3,336 votes	1.1% 28,372 votes (Note: Includes: 0.8% for Chris Christie (withdrawn, 20,210 votes); 0.2% for Rachel Swift (4,253 votes); 0.2% for David Stuckenberg (3,909 votes))
March 5 (Super Tuesday) (865)	37	Colorado	63.5% 25 delegates 555,863 votes	33.3% 12 delegates 291,615 votes	0.3% 2,220 votes	1.4% 12,672 votes	0.6% 5,113 votes	0.1% 1,269 votes	0.8% 7,188 votes (Note: All for Chris Christie.)
March 5 (Super Tuesday) (865)	20	Maine	71.9% 20 delegates 79,034 votes	25.4% 27,912 votes	0.3% 299 votes	1.1% 1,191 votes	0.4% 440 votes	Not on ballot	0.9% 1,022 ballots (Note: All as blank ballots)
March 5 (Super Tuesday) (865)	40	Massachusetts	59.8% 40 delegates 343,189 votes	36.8% 211,440 votes	0.1% 619 votes	0.7% 3,981 votes	0.3% 1,738 votes	0.1% 527 votes	2.6% 14,756 votes (Note: Includes: 1.0% for No Preference (5,717 votes); 0.9% for Chris Christie (withdrawn, 5,217 votes); 0.4% as blank ballots (2,148 ballots); 0.3% for other on-ballot candidates (1,674 votes))
March 5 (Super Tuesday) (865)	39	Minnesota	69.1% 27 delegates 232,846 votes	28.8% 12 delegates 97,182 votes	Not on ballot	1.2% 4,085 votes	0.4% 1,470 votes	Not on ballot	0.4% 1,431 votes
March 5 (Super Tuesday) (865)	75	North Carolina	73.8% 62 delegates 793,978 votes	23.3% 12 delegates 250,838 votes	0.1% 916 votes	1.4% 14,740 votes	0.3% 3,418 votes	0.1% 727 votes	1.0% 10,614 votes (Note: Includes: 0.7% for No preference (7,448 votes); 0.3% for Chris Christie (withdrawn, 3,166 votes))
March 5 (Super Tuesday) (865)	43	Oklahoma	81.8% 43 delegates 254,928 votes	15.9% 49,406 votes	0.1% 303 votes	1.3% 3,946 votes	0.3% 1,022 votes	0.1% 431 votes	0.5% 1,492 votes (Note: Includes: 0.4% for Chris Christie (withdrawn, 1,095 votes); 0.1% for David Stuckenberg (397 votes))
March 5 (Super Tuesday) (865)	58	Tennessee	77.3% 58 delegates 446,850 votes	19.5% 112,958 votes	0.1% 722 votes	1.4% 7,947 votes	0.3% 1,714 votes	0.1% 533 votes	1.2% 7,119 votes (Note: Includes: 0.8% for Uncommitted (4,884 votes); 0.3% for Chris Christie (withdrawn, 1,874 votes); 0.1% for David Stuckenberg (352 votes))
March 5 (Super Tuesday) (865)	162	Texas	77.8% 161 delegates 1,808,269 votes	17.5% 405,472 votes	0.1% 2,585 votes	1.6% 36,302 votes	0.5% 10,582 votes	0.1% 2,964 votes	2.4% 56,845 votes (Note: Includes: 2.0% for Uncommitted (45,568 votes); 0.4% for Chris Christie (withdrawn, 8,938 votes); 0.1% for David Stuckenberg (2,339 votes))
March 5 (Super Tuesday) (865)	40	Utah	56.4% 40 delegates 48,350 votes	42.7% 36,621 votes	1.0% 826 votes	0% 0 votes	0% 0 votes	0% 0 votes	Not on ballot
March 5 (Super Tuesday) (865)	17	Vermont	45.1% 8 delegates 33,162 votes	49.3% 9 delegates 36,241 votes	0.4% 278 vote	1.3% 949 votes	0.7% 546 votes	Not on ballot	3.2% 2,311 votes (Note: Includes: 1.4% for Chris Christie (1,020 votes); 0.9% as blank ballots (654 ballots); 0.8% for Write-in candidates (586 votes); 0.07% as over votes (51 ballots))
March 5 (Super Tuesday) (865)	48	Virginia	63.0% 42 delegates 440,416 votes	35.0% 6 delegates 244,586 votes	0.1% 853 votes	1.1% 7,494 votes	0.4% 2,503 votes	Not on ballot	0.5% 3,384 votes
March 8	9	American Samoa	100.0% 9 delegates 110 votes	0.0% 0 votes	Not on ballot		0.0% 0 votes	0.0% 0 votes	0.0% 0 votes
March 12 (160)	59	Georgia	84.5% 59 delegates 497,594 votes	13.2% 77,902 votes	0.1% 377 votes	1.3% 7,457 votes	0.2% 1,244 votes	0.1% 383 votes	0.7% 3,990 votes (Note: Includes: 0.3% for Chris Christie (2,054 votes); 0.2% for Tim Scott (1,398 votes); <0.1% for David Stuckenberg (243 votes); <0.1% for Doug Burgum (161 votes); <0.1% for Perry Johnson (134 votes))
March 12 (160)	19	Hawaii	97.1% 19 delegates 4,348 votes	1.5% 68 votes	<0.1% 2 votes	0.6% 25 votes	0.6% 26 votes	Not on ballot	0.2% 10 votes (Note: Includes: 0.2% for Chris Christie (8 votes); <0.1% for Doug Burgum (1 vote); <0.1% for David Stuckenberg (1 vote))
March 12 (160)	40	Mississippi	92.5% 40 delegates 229,198 votes	5.4% 13,437 votes	Not on ballot	1.6% 4,042 votes	0.4% 1,096 votes	Not on ballot	Not on ballot
March 12 (160)	43	Washington	76.4% 43 delegates 601,070 votes	19.3% 151,485 votes	Not on ballot	2.3% 17,870 votes	0.9% 7,318 votes	Not on ballot	1.1% 8,702 votes
March 15	9	Northern Mariana Islands	90.1% 9 delegates 319 votes	9.9% 35 votes	Not on ballot				
March 16	9	Guam	100% 9 delegates 178 votes	0.0% 0 votes	Not on ballot				0.0% 0 votes
March 19 (349)	43	Arizona	78.8% 43 delegates 492,299 votes	17.8% 110,966 votes	0.1% 891 votes	1.6% 10,131 votes	0.4% 2,479 votes	0.1% 714 votes	1.1% 6,908 votes (Note: Includes: 0.8% for Chris Christie (5,078 votes); 0.2% for David Stuckenberg (1,367 votes); 0.1% for John Anthony Castro (505 votes))
March 19 (349)	125	Florida	81.2% 125 delegates 911,424 votes	13.9% 155,560 votes	0.1% 1,385 votes	3.7% 41,269 votes	0.3% 2,850 votes	0.1% 1,190 votes	0.8% 8,953 votes
March 19 (349)	64	Illinois	80.5% 64 delegates 479,556 votes	14.5% 86,278 votes	0.5% 3,114 votes	2.9% 16,990 votes	Not on ballot	Not on ballot	1.6% 9,758 votes
March 19 (349)	39	Kansas	75.5% 39 delegates 72,115 votes	16.1% 15,339 votes	0.5% 508 votes	2.7% 2,543 votes	Not on ballot		5.2% 4,982 votes (Note: All for None of the Names Shown)
March 19 (349)	78	Ohio	79.2% 79 delegates 896,059 votes	14.4% 162,563 votes	Not on ballot	3.4% 38,089 votes	1.3% 14,450 votes	Not on ballot	1.8% 20,027 votes
March 23	47	Louisiana	89.8% 47 delegates 172,503 votes	6.8% 13,123 votes	0.3% 580 votes	1.6% 3,022 votes	0.3% 595 votes	0.3% 519 votes	1.0% 1,826 votes (Note: Includes: 0.7% for Chris Christie (1,281 votes); 0.2% for Rachel Swift (335 vote); 0.1% for David Stuckenberg (210 vote))
April 2 (195)	28	Connecticut	77.9% 28 delegates 34,750 votes	14.0% 6,229 votes	0.4% 184 votes	2.9% 1,289 votes	Not on ballot		4.8% 2,166 votes (Note: All for Uncommitted)
April 2 (195)	91	New York (93% in)	81.2% 91 delegates 132,698 votes	12.9% 21,145 votes	Not on ballot		1.0% 1,667 votes	Not on ballot	4.9% 7,990 votes (Note: Includes: 4.1% for Chris Christie (withdrawn, 6,679 votes); 0.8% as blank or void ballots (1,311 votes))
April 2 (195)	19	Rhode Island	84.5% 17 delegates 10,898 votes	10.6% 2 delegates 1,371 votes	Not on ballot	1.4% 178 votes	0.3% 40 votes	Not on ballot	3.2% 411 votes (Note: Includes: 2.0% for Uncommitted (257 votes); 1.2% for Chris Christie (154 votes))
April 2 (195)	41	Wisconsin	79.2% 41 delegates 477,103 votes	12.8% 76,841 votes	Not on ballot	3.3% 20,124 votes	0.9% 5,200 votes	Not on ballot	3.8% 22,828 votes (Note: Includes: 2.2% for Uninstructed (13,057 votes); 1.6% for Chris Christie (9,771 votes))
April 18–20	29	Wyoming	100% 29 delegates	Not on ballot					
April 21	23	Puerto Rico	96.2% 23 delegates 992 votes	Not on ballot					3.8% 39 votes
April 23	67	Pennsylvania	82.8% 67 delegates 790,662 votes	16.5% 157,222 votes	Not on ballot				0.7% 6,677 votes (Note: All for write-in candidates)
May 7	58	Indiana	78.3% 58 delegates 464,399 votes	21.7% 128,812 votes	Not on ballot				
May 14 (104)	37	Maryland	77.3% 37 delegates 220,493 votes	22.7% 64,592 votes	Not on ballot				
May 14 (104)	36	Nebraska	79.9% 36 delegates 167,864 votes	18.2% 38,257 votes	Not on ballot				1.9% 3,907 votes (Note: Includes: 1.9% for Perry Johnson (3,907 votes); 0.8% for write-in candidates (1,671 votes))
May 14 (104)	32	West Virginia	88.4% 32 delegates 199,497 votes	9.4% 21,231 votes	0.7% 1,481 votes	Not on ballot			1.5% 3,494 votes (Note: Includes: 1.0% for Rachel Swift (2,326 votes); 0.5% for David Stuckenberg (1,168 votes))
May 21 (77)	46	Kentucky	85.0% 46 delegates 215,044 votes	6.4% 16,232 votes	0.4% 900 votes	3.1% 7,803 votes	0.7% 1,640 votes	Not on ballot	4.5% 11,445 votes (Note: Includes: 3.5% for Uncommitted (8,984 votes); 1.0% for Chris Christie (2,461 votes))
May 21 (77)	31	Oregon	91.6% 31 delegates 293,425 votes	Not on ballot					8.4% 27,043 votes
June 4 (91)	31	Montana	90.9% 31 delegates 165,678 votes	Not on ballot					9.1% 16,570 votes (Note: All for No preference)
June 4 (91)	12 (Note: New Jersey lost 40 of its delegates for holding its primary after May 31.)	New Jersey	12 delegates	Not on ballot					
June 4 (91)	22	New Mexico	84.5% 22 delegates 78,999 votes	8.6% 8,054 votes	Not on ballot		0.9% 886 votes	Not on ballot	5.9% 5,558 votes (Note: Includes: 3.4% for Uncommitted (3,130 votes); 2.6% for Chris Christie (2,428 votes))
Total	2,429	See above	2,320 delegates	97 delegates	0 delegates	9 delegates	3 delegates	0 delegates	0 delegates

=== Other candidates ===
Eight candidates suspended their campaigns before the Iowa caucuses. Five major candidates had withdrawn from the race after states began to certify candidates for ballot spots: Perry Johnson, Mike Pence, Doug Burgum, and Chris Christie. Asa Hutchinson also dropped out after the Iowa caucuses. Since the beginning of the primary season, none of these candidates have been awarded any delegates.

Legend:	Candidate has withdrawn	Candidate unable to appear on ballot

Candidates		John Anthony Castro	David Stuckenberg	Rachel Swift	Chris Christie	Doug Burgum	Tim Scott	Mike Pence	Perry Johnson
Withdrawal date		—	—	—	Jan 10 2024	Dec 4 2023	Nov 12 2023	Oct 28 2023	Oct 20 2023
Date	State								framelesscenter
Jan 15	IA	0	0	0	35				
Jan 23	NH	19	25	105	1,493	180	196	404	26
Feb 6	NV (primary)	270					1,081	3,091	
Feb 8	VI				3 (First Round); 0 (Final Round)				6 (First Round); 0 (Final Round)
Feb 24	SC		361		658				
Feb 27	MI				4,794				
Mar 2	ID				91				
Mar 2	MO		0						
Mar 3	DC		8		18				
Mar 4	ND		19						
Mar 5	AL		752		1,442				
Mar 5	AR		151		600	157			
Mar 5	CA		3,909	4,253	20,210				
Mar 5	CO				7,188				
Mar 5	MA				5,125				
Mar 5	MN				1,431				
Mar 5	NC				3,166				
Mar 5	OK		397		1,095				
Mar 5	TN		352		1,874				
Mar 5	TX		2,339		8,938				
Mar 5	VT				1,020		2	3	
Mar 5	VA				3,384				
March 12	GA		243		2,054	161	1,398		134
March 12	HI		1		8	1			
March 12	WA				8,702				
Mar 19	AZ	505	1,367		5,078				
Mar 19	FL				8,953				
Mar 19	IL				9,758				
Mar 19	OH				20,027				
Mar 23	LA		210	335	1,281				
Apr 2	NY				6,679				
Apr 2	RI				514				
Apr 2	WI				9,771				
May 21	KY				2,461				
June 4	NM				2,428				

== State-wide results ==
=== Iowa ===
Iowa Republican precinct caucuses, January 15, 2024
Candidate	Votes	Percentage	Actual delegate count		
Candidate	Votes	Percentage	Bound	Unbound	Total
Donald Trump	56,243	51.00%	20	0	20
Ron DeSantis	23,491	21.30%	9	0	9
Nikki Haley	21,027	19.07%	8	0	8
Vivek Ramaswamy	8,430	7.64%	3	0	3
Ryan Binkley	768	0.70%	0	0	0
Asa Hutchinson	188	0.17%	0	0	0
Other	90	0.08%	0	0	0
Chris Christie (withdrawn)	35	0.03%	0	0	0
Total:	110,272	100.00%	40	0	40

=== New Hampshire ===
New Hampshire Republican primary, January 23, 2024
Candidate	Votes	Percentage	Delegate count				
Candidate	Votes	Percentage	Delegate count	Donald Trump	176,391	54.35%	13
Nikki Haley	140,491	43.28%	9				
Ron DeSantis (withdrawn)	2,241	0.69%					
Chris Christie (withdrawn)	1,493	0.46%					
Vivek Ramaswamy (withdrawn)	833	0.26%					
Joe Biden (write-in) (Democrat)	497	0.15%					
Mike Pence (withdrawn)	404	0.12%					
Ryan Binkley	315	0.10%					
Mary Maxwell	287	0.09%					
Robert F. Kennedy (write-in) (Independent)	205	0.06%					
Tim Scott (withdrawn)	196	0.06%					
Doug Burgum (withdrawn)	180	0.06%					
Asa Hutchinson (withdrawn)	108	0.03%					
Rachel Swift	105	0.03%					
Scott Ayers	80	0.02%					
Dean Phillips (write-in) (Democrat)	79	0.02%					
Darius Mitchell	74	0.02%					
Glenn McPeters	49	0.02%					
"Ceasefire" (write-in)	34	0.01%					
Perry Johnson (withdrawn)	26	0.01%					
Peter Jedick	25	0.01%					
David Stuckenberg	25	0.01%					
Donald Kjornes	23	0.01%					
Scott Merrell	21	0.01%					
John Anthony Castro	19	0.01%					
Robert Carney	15	<0.01%					
Marianne Williamson (write-in) (Democrat)	14	<0.01%					
Hirsh Singh (withdrawn)	9	<0.01%					
Sam Sloan	7	<0.01%					
Vermin Supreme (write-in) (Democrat)	3	<0.01%					
Mark Steward Greenstein (write-in) (Democrat)	1	<0.01%					
Other write-in votes	325	0.10%					
Total:	324,575	100.00%	22				

=== Nevada ===
==== Primary ====
Nevada Republican primary, February 6, 2024
Candidate	Votes	Percentage			
Candidate	Votes	Percentage	None of These Candidates	50,763	63.26%
Nikki Haley	24,583	30.63%			
Mike Pence (withdrawn)	3,091	3.85%			
Tim Scott (withdrawn)	1,081	1.35%			
John Anthony Castro	270	0.34%			
Hirsh V. Singh (withdrawn)	200	0.25%			
Donald Kjornes	166	0.21%			
Heath V. Fulkerson	95	0.12%			
Total:	80,249	100.00%			

==== Caucus ====
Nevada Republican caucus, February 8, 2024
Candidate	Votes	Percentage	Actual delegate count		
Candidate	Votes	Percentage	Bound	Unbound	Total
Donald Trump	59,982	99.11%	25	1 (Note: If a candidate wins all of Nevada's delegates, the NRP chair is automatically unbound. He has pledged his support to Trump.)	26
Ryan Binkley	540	0.89%	0	0	0
Total	60,522	100.00%	25	1	26

=== Virgin Islands ===
Virgin Islands Republican caucus, February 8, 2024
Candidate	First Choice			Round 1			Round 2			Round 3			Round 4		Actual delegate count		
Candidate	Votes	%	Transfer	Votes	%	Transfer	Votes	%	Transfer	Votes	%	Transfer	Votes	%	Bound	Unbound	Total
Donald Trump	180	69.50%	+0	180	69.50%	+1	181	69.88%	+2	183	71.48%	+4	187	74.21%	1	3	4
Nikki Haley	52	20.08%	+2	54	20.85%	+0	54	20.85%	+0	54	21.09%	+11	65	25.79%	0		
Ron DeSantis (withdrawn)	15	5.79%	+0	15	5.79%	+2	17	6.56%	+2	19	7.42%	−19	Eliminated		0		
Perry Johnson (withdrawn)	6	2.32%	+1	7	2.70%	+0	7	2.70%	−7	Eliminated					0		
Vivek Ramaswamy (withdrawn)	3	1.16%	+0	3	1.16%	−3	Eliminated								0		
Chris Christie (withdrawn)	3	1.16%	−3	Eliminated											0		
Total	259			259			259			256			252		1	3	4
Blank or inactive ballots	0		+0	0		+0	0		+3	3		+4	7		—		

=== South Carolina ===
South Carolina Republican primary, February 24, 2024
Candidate	Votes	Percentage	Actual delegate count		
Candidate	Votes	Percentage	Bound	Unbound	Total
Donald Trump	452,496	59.79%	47		47
Nikki Haley	299,084	39.52%	3		3
Ron DeSantis (withdrawn)	2,953	0.39%			
Vivek Ramaswamy (withdrawn)	726	0.10%			
Chris Christie (withdrawn)	658	0.09%			
Ryan Binkley	528	0.07%			
David Stuckenberg	361	0.05%			
Total:	756,806	100.00%	50	0	50

=== Michigan ===
==== Primary ====
Michigan Republican primary, February 27, 2024
Candidate	Votes	Percentage	Actual delegate count		
Candidate	Votes	Percentage	Bound	Unbound	Total
Donald Trump	761,163	68.12%	12	0	12
Nikki Haley	297,124	26.59%	4	0	4
Uncommitted	33,649	3.01%	0	0	0
Ron DeSantis (withdrawn)	13,456	1.20%	0	0	0
Chris Christie (withdrawn)	4,794	0.43%	0	0	0
Vivek Ramaswamy (withdrawn)	3,702	0.33%	0	0	0
Ryan Binkley	2,348	0.21%	0	0	0
Asa Hutchinson (withdrawn)	1,077	0.10%	0	0	0
Total:	1,117,313	100.00%	16	0	16

==== Caucus ====
Michigan Republican caucus, March 2, 2024
Candidate	Votes	Percentage	Actual delegate count		
Candidate	Votes	Percentage	Bound	Unbound	Total
Donald Trump	1,575	97.77%	39	0	39
Nikki Haley	36	2.23%	0	0	0
Total:	1,611	100.00%	39	0	39

=== Idaho ===
Idaho Republican caucus, March 2, 2024
Candidate	Votes	Percentage	Actual delegate count		
Candidate	Votes	Percentage	Bound	Unbound	Total
Donald Trump	33,603	84.89%	32	0	32
Nikki Haley	5,221	13.18%	0	0	0
Ron DeSantis (withdrawn)	534	1.35%	0	0	0
Vivek Ramaswamy (withdrawn)	95	0.24%	0	0	0
Chris Christie (withdrawn)	91	0.23%	0	0	0
Ryan Binkley (withdrawn)	40	0.10%	0	0	0
Total	39,584	100.00%	32	0	32

=== Missouri ===
Missouri Republican caucus, March 2, 2024
Candidate	State delegates	Percentage	Actual delegate count		
Candidate	State delegates	Percentage	Bound	Unbound	Total
Donald Trump	924	100.00	54	0	54
Nikki Haley	0	0.00	0	0	0
David Stuckenberg	0	0.00	0	0	0
Total:	924	100	54	0	54

=== Washington D.C. ===
District of Columbia Republican primary, March 1–3, 2024
Candidate	Votes	Percentage	Actual delegate count		
Candidate	Votes	Percentage	Bound	Unbound	Total
Nikki Haley	1,274	62.76%	19	0	19
Donald Trump	676	33.30%	0	0	0
Ron DeSantis (withdrawn)	38	1.87%	0	0	0
Chris Christie (withdrawn)	18	0.89%	0	0	0
Vivek Ramaswamy (withdrawn)	15	0.74%	0	0	0
David Stuckenberg	8	0.39%	0	0	0
Ryan Binkley (withdrawn)	1	0.05%	0	0	0
Total:	2,030	100.00%	19	0	19

=== North Dakota ===
North Dakota Republican caucus, March 4, 2024
Candidate	Votes	Percentage	Actual delegate count		
Candidate	Votes	Percentage	Bound	Unbound	Total
Donald Trump	1,632	84.43%	29	0	29
Nikki Haley	273	14.12%	0	0	0
David Stuckenberg	19	0.98%	0	0	0
Ryan Binkley (withdrawn)	9	0.47%	0	0	0
Total:	1,933	100.00%	29	0	29

=== Alabama ===
Alabama Republican primary, March 5, 2024
Candidate	Votes	Percentage	Actual delegate count		
Candidate	Votes	Percentage	Bound	Unbound	Total
Donald Trump	499,147	83.20%	50	0	50
Nikki Haley	77,989	13.00%	0	0	0
Uncommitted	9,807	1.63%	0	0	0
Ron DeSantis (withdrawn)	8,452	1.41%	0	0	0
Vivek Ramaswamy (withdrawn)	1,864	0.31%	0	0	0
Chris Christie (withdrawn)	1,442	0.24%	0	0	0
David Stuckenberg	752	0.13%	0	0	0
Ryan Binkley	509	0.08%	0	0	0
Total:	599,962	100.00%	50	0	50

=== Alaska ===
Alaska Republican primary, March 5, 2024
Candidate	Votes	Percentage	Actual delegate count		
Candidate	Votes	Percentage	Bound	Unbound	Total
Donald Trump	9,243	87.58%	29		29
Nikki Haley	1,266	12.00%			
Vivek Ramaswamy (withdrawn)	45	0.43%			
Total:	10,554	100.00%	29		29

=== Arkansas ===
Arkansas Republican primary, March 5, 2024
Candidate	Votes	Percentage	Actual delegate count		
Candidate	Votes	Percentage	Bound	Unbound	Total
Donald Trump	204,898	76.89%	39		39
Nikki Haley	49,085	18.42%	1		1
Asa Hutchinson (withdrawn)	7,377	2.77%			
Ron DeSantis (withdrawn)	3,162	1.19%			
Vivek Ramaswamy (withdrawn)	860	0.32%			
Chris Christie (withdrawn)	600	0.23%			
Ryan Binkley (withdrawn)	183	0.07%			
Doug Burgum (withdrawn)	157	0.06%			
David Stuckenberg	151	0.06%			
Total:	266,473	100.00%	40		40

=== California ===
California Republican primary, March 5, 2024
Candidate	Votes	Percentage	Actual delegate count		
Candidate	Votes	Percentage	Bound	Unbound	Total
Donald Trump	1,962,905	79.25%	169	0	169
Nikki Haley	431,876	17.44%	0	0	0
Ron DeSantis (withdrawn)	35,717	1.44%	0	0	0
Chris Christie (withdrawn)	20,210	0.82%	0	0	0
Vivek Ramaswamy (withdrawn)	11,113	0.45%	0	0	0
Rachel Swift	4,253	0.17%	0	0	0
David Stuckenberg	3,909	0.16%	0	0	0
Ryan Binkley (withdrawn)	3,577	0.14%	0	0	0
Asa Hutchinson (withdrawn)	3,336	0.13%	0	0	0
Total:	2,476,896	100.00%	169	0	169

=== Colorado ===
Colorado Republican primary, March 5, 2024
Candidate	Votes	Percentage	Actual delegate count		
Candidate	Votes	Percentage	Bound	Unbound	Total
Donald Trump	555,863	63.46%	24		
Nikki Haley	291,615	33.29%	12		
Ron DeSantis (withdrawn)	12,672	1.45%			
Chris Christie (withdrawn)	7,188	0.82%			
Vivek Ramaswamy (withdrawn)	5,113	0.58%			
Ryan Binkley (withdrawn)	2,220	0.25%			
Asa Hutchinson (withdrawn)	1,269	0.14%			
Total:	875,940	100.00%	36	1	37

=== Maine ===
Maine Republican primary, March 5, 2024
Candidate	Votes	Percentage	Actual delegate count		
Candidate	Votes	Percentage	Bound	Unbound	Total
Donald Trump	79,034	71.92%	20	0	20
Nikki Haley	27,912	25.40%	0	0	0
Ron DeSantis (withdrawn)	1,191	1.08%	0	0	0
Vivek Ramaswamy (withdrawn)	440	0.40%	0	0	0
Ryan Binkley (withdrawn)	299	0.27%	0	0	0
Blank ballots	1,022	0.93%	0	0	0
Total:	109,898	100.00%	20	0	20

=== Massachusetts ===
Massachusetts Republican primary, March 5, 2024
Candidate	Votes	Percentage	Actual delegate count		
Candidate	Votes	Percentage	Bound	Unbound	Total
Donald Trump	343,189	59.56%	40	0	40
Nikki Haley	211,440	36.69%	0	0	0
No Preference	5,717	0.99%	0	0	0
Chris Christie (withdrawn)	5,217	0.91%	0	0	0
Ron DeSantis (withdrawn)	3,981	0.69%	0	0	0
Vivek Ramaswamy (withdrawn)	1,738	0.30%	0	0	0
Other candidates	1,674	0.29%	0	0	0
Ryan Binkley (withdrawn)	619	0.11%	0	0	0
Asa Hutchinson (withdrawn)	527	0.09%	0	0	0
Blank ballots	2,148	0.37%	0	0	0
Total:	576,250	100.00%	40	0	40

=== Minnesota ===
Minnesota Republican primary, March 5, 2024
Candidate	Votes	Percentage	Actual delegate count		
Candidate	Votes	Percentage	Bound	Unbound	Total
Donald Trump	232,846	68.94%	27	0	27
Nikki Haley	97,182	28.77%	12	0	12
Ron DeSantis (withdrawn)	4,085	1.21%	0	0	0
Vivek Ramaswamy (withdrawn)	1,470	0.44%	0	0	0
Chris Christie (withdrawn)	1,431	0.42%	0	0	0
Write-ins	720	0.21%	0	0	0
Total:	337,014	100.00%	39	0	39

=== North Carolina ===
North Carolina Republican primary, March 5, 2024
Candidate	Votes	Percentage	Actual delegate count		
Candidate	Votes	Percentage	Bound	Unbound	Total
Donald Trump	793,978	73.84%	62		62
Nikki Haley	250,838	23.33%	12		12
Ron DeSantis (withdrawn)	14,740	1.37%			
No Preference	7,448	0.69%			
Vivek Ramaswamy (withdrawn)	3,418	0.32%			
Chris Christie (withdrawn)	3,166	0.29%			
Ryan Binkley (withdrawn)	916	0.09%			
Asa Hutchinson (withdrawn)	727	0.07%			
Total:	1,075,231	100.00%	74		74

=== Oklahoma ===
Oklahoma Republican primary, March 5, 2024
Candidate	Votes	Percentage	Actual delegate count		
Candidate	Votes	Percentage	Bound	Unbound	Total
Donald Trump	254,928	81.83%	43		43
Nikki Haley	49,406	15.86%			
Ron DeSantis (withdrawn)	3,946	1.27%			
Chris Christie (withdrawn)	1,095	0.35%			
Vivek Ramaswamy (withdrawn)	1,022	0.33%			
Asa Hutchinson (withdrawn)	431	0.14%			
David Stuckenberg	397	0.13%			
Ryan Binkley (withdrawn)	303	0.10%			
Total:	311,528	100.00%	43		43

=== Tennessee ===
Tennessee Republican primary, March 5, 2024
Candidate	Votes	Percentage	Actual delegate count		
Candidate	Votes	Percentage	Bound	Unbound	Total
Donald Trump	446,850	77.33%	58	0	58
Nikki Haley	112,958	19.55%	0	0	0
Ron DeSantis (withdrawn)	7,947	1.38%	0	0	0
Uncommitted	4,884	0.85%	0	0	0
Chris Christie (withdrawn)	1,874	0.32%	0	0	0
Vivek Ramaswamy (withdrawn)	1,714	0.30%	0	0	0
Ryan Binkley (withdrawn)	722	0.13%	0	0	0
Asa Hutchinson (withdrawn)	533	0.09%	0	0	0
David Stuckenberg	352	0.06%	0	0	0
Total:	577,834	100.00%	58	0	58

=== Texas ===
Texas Republican primary, March 5, 2024
Candidate	Votes	Percentage	Actual delegate count		
Candidate	Votes	Percentage	Bound	Unbound	Total
Donald Trump	1,808,269	77.84%	161		161
Nikki Haley	405,472	17.45%			
Uncommitted	45,568	1.96%			
Ron DeSantis (withdrawn)	36,302	1.56%			
Vivek Ramaswamy (withdrawn)	10,582	0.46%			
Chris Christie (withdrawn)	8,938	0.38%			
Asa Hutchinson (withdrawn)	2,964	0.13%			
Ryan Binkley (withdrawn)	2,585	0.11%			
David Stuckenberg	2,339	0.10%			
Total:	2,323,019	100.00%	161		161

=== Utah ===
Utah Republican caucus, March 5, 2024
Candidate	Votes	Percentage	Actual delegate count		
Candidate	Votes	Percentage	Bound	Unbound	Total
Donald Trump	48,350	56.35%	40		40
Nikki Haley	36,621	42.68%			
Ryan Binkley (withdrawn)	826	0.96%			
Total:	85,797	100.00%	40		40

=== Vermont ===
Vermont Republican primary, March 5, 2024
Candidate	Votes	Percentage	Actual delegate count		
Candidate	Votes	Percentage	Bound	Unbound	Total
Nikki Haley	36,241	49.32%	9		9
Donald Trump	33,162	45.13%	8		8
Chris Christie (withdrawn)	1,020	1.39%			
Ron DeSantis (withdrawn)	949	1.29%			
Write-in votes	586	0.80%			
Vivek Ramaswamy (withdrawn)	546	0.74%			
Ryan Binkley (withdrawn)	278	0.38%			
Overvotes	51	0.07%			
Blank ballots	654	0.89%			
Total:	73,487	100.00%	17		17

=== Virginia ===
Virginia Republican primary, March 5, 2024
Candidate	Votes	Percentage	Actual delegate count		
Candidate	Votes	Percentage	Bound	Unbound	Total
Donald Trump	440,416	62.99%	39	3	42
Nikki Haley	244,586	34.98%	6		6
Ron DeSantis (withdrawn)	7,494	1.07%			
Chris Christie (withdrawn)	3,384	0.48%			
Vivek Ramaswamy (withdrawn)	2,503	0.36%			
Ryan Binkley (withdrawn)	853	0.12%			
Total:	699,236	100.00%	45	3	48

=== American Samoa ===
American Samoa Republican caucuses, March 5, 2024
Candidate	Votes	Percentage	Actual delegate count		
Candidate	Votes	Percentage	Bound	Unbound	Total
Donald Trump	110	100.00%	0	9	9
Total:	110	100.00%	0	9	9

=== Georgia ===
Georgia Republican primary, March 12, 2024
Candidate	Votes	Percentage	Actual delegate count		
Candidate	Votes	Percentage	Bound	Unbound	Total
Donald Trump	497,594	84.49%	59	0	59
Nikki Haley (withdrawn)	77,902	13.23%	0	0	0
Ron DeSantis (withdrawn)	7,457	1.27%	0	0	0
Chris Christie (withdrawn)	2,054	0.35%	0	0	0
Tim Scott (withdrawn)	1,398	0.24%	0	0	0
Vivek Ramaswamy (withdrawn)	1,244	0.21%	0	0	0
Asa Hutchinson (withdrawn)	383	0.07%	0	0	0
Ryan Binkley (withdrawn)	377	0.06%	0	0	0
David Stuckenberg	243	0.04%	0	0	0
Doug Burgum (withdrawn)	161	0.03%	0	0	0
Perry Johnson (withdrawn)	134	0.02%	0	0	0
Total:	588,947	100.00%	59	0	59

=== Hawaii ===
Hawaii Republican caucuses, March 12, 2024
Candidate	Votes	Percentage	Actual delegate count		
Candidate	Votes	Percentage	Bound	Unbound	Total
Donald Trump	4,348	97.08%	19	0	19
Nikki Haley (withdrawn)	68	1.52%	0	0	0
Vivek Ramaswamy (withdrawn)	26	0.58%	0	0	0
Ron DeSantis (withdrawn)	25	0.56%	0	0	0
Chris Christie (withdrawn)	8	0.18%	0	0	0
Ryan Binkley (withdrawn)	2	0.04%	0	0	0
Doug Burgum (withdrawn)	1	0.02%	0	0	0
David Stuckenberg	1	0.02%	0	0	0
Total:	4,479	100.00%	19	0	19

=== Mississippi ===
Mississippi Republican primary, March 12, 2024
Candidate	Votes	Percentage	Actual delegate count		
Candidate	Votes	Percentage	Bound	Unbound	Total
Donald Trump	229,198	92.50%	40	0	40
Nikki Haley (withdrawn)	13,437	5.42%	0	0	0
Ron DeSantis (withdrawn)	4,042	1.63%	0	0	0
Vivek Ramaswamy (withdrawn)	1,096	0.44%	0	0	0
Total:	247,773	100.00%	40	0	40

=== Washington ===
Washington Republican primary, March 12, 2024
Candidate	Votes	Percentage	Actual delegate count		
Candidate	Votes	Percentage	Bound	Unbound	Total
Donald Trump	601,070	76.43%	43	0	43
Nikki Haley (withdrawn)	151,485	19.26%	0	0	0
Ron DeSantis (withdrawn)	17,870	2.27%	0	0	0
Chris Christie (withdrawn)	8,702	1.11%	0	0	0
Vivek Ramaswamy (withdrawn)	7,318	0.93%	0	0	0
Total:	786,445	100.00%	43	0	43

=== Northern Mariana Islands ===
Northern Mariana Islands Republican caucuses, March 12, 2024
Candidate	Votes	Percentage	Actual delegate count		
Candidate	Votes	Percentage	Bound	Unbound	Total
Donald Trump	319	90.11%	9	0	9
Nikki Haley	35	9.89%	0	0	0
Total:	354	100.00%	9	0	9

=== Guam ===
Guam Republican presidential caucuses, March 16, 2024
Candidate	Votes	Percentage	Actual delegate count		
Candidate	Votes	Percentage	Bound	Unbound	Total
Donald Trump	178	100.00%	9		9
Nikki Haley (withdrawn)	0	0.00%	0		0
Total:	178	100.00%	9		9

=== Arizona ===
Arizona Republican primary, March 19, 2024
Candidate	Votes	Percentage	Actual delegate count		
Candidate	Votes	Percentage	Bound	Unbound	Total
Donald Trump	492,299	78.84%	43		43
Nikki Haley (withdrawn)	110,966	17.77%			
Ron DeSantis (withdrawn)	10,131	1.62%			
Chris Christie (withdrawn)	5,078	0.81%			
Vivek Ramaswamy (withdrawn)	2,479	0.40%			
David Stuckenberg	1,367	0.22%			
Ryan Binkley (withdrawn)	891	0.14%			
Asa Hutchinson (withdrawn)	714	0.11%			
John Anthony Castro	505	0.08%			
Total:	624,430	100.00%	43		43

=== Florida ===
Florida Republican primary, March 19, 2024
Candidate	Votes	Percentage	Actual delegate count		
Candidate	Votes	Percentage	Bound	Unbound	Total
Donald Trump	911,424	81.19%	125	0	125
Nikki Haley (withdrawn)	155,560	13.86%	0	0	0
Ron DeSantis (withdrawn)	41,269	3.68%	0	0	0
Chris Christie (withdrawn)	8,953	0.80%	0	0	0
Vivek Ramaswamy (withdrawn)	2,850	0.25%	0	0	0
Ryan Binkley (withdrawn)	1,385	0.12%	0	0	0
Asa Hutchinson (withdrawn)	1,190	0.11%	0	0	0
Total:	1,122,631	100.00%	125	0	125

=== Illinois ===
Illinois Republican primary, March 19, 2024
Candidate	Votes	Percentage	Actual delegate count		
Candidate	Votes	Percentage	Bound	Unbound	Total
Donald Trump	479,556	80.50%	64	0	64
Nikki Haley (withdrawn)	86,278	14.48%	0	0	0
Ron DeSantis (withdrawn)	16,990	2.85%	0	0	0
Chris Christie (withdrawn)	9,758	1.64%	0	0	0
Ryan Binkley (withdrawn)	3,114	0.52%	0	0	0
Total:	595,696	100.00%	64	0	64

=== Kansas ===
Kansas Republican primary, March 19, 2024
Candidate	Votes	Percentage	Actual delegate count		
Candidate	Votes	Percentage	Bound	Unbound	Total
Donald Trump	72,115	75.52%	39		39
Nikki Haley (withdrawn)	15,339	16.06%			
None of the Names Shown	4,982	5.22%			
Ron DeSantis (withdrawn)	2,543	2.66%			
Ryan Binkley (withdrawn)	508	0.53%			
Total:	95,487	100.00%	39		39

=== Ohio ===
Ohio Republican primary, March 19, 2024
Candidate	Votes	Percentage	Actual delegate count		
Candidate	Votes	Percentage	Bound	Unbound	Total
Donald Trump	896,059	79.21%	79		79
Nikki Haley (withdrawn)	162,563	14.37%			
Ron DeSantis (withdrawn)	38,089	3.37%			
Chris Christie (withdrawn)	20,027	1.77%			
Vivek Ramaswamy (withdrawn)	14,450	1.28%			
Total:	1,131,188	100.00%	79		79

=== Louisiana ===
Louisiana Republican primary, March 22, 2024
Candidate	Votes	Percentage	Actual delegate count		
Candidate	Votes	Percentage	Bound	Unbound	Total
Donald Trump	172,503	89.77%	47		47
Nikki Haley (withdrawn)	13,123	6.83%			
Ron DeSantis (withdrawn)	3,022	1.57%			
Chris Christie (withdrawn)	1,281	0.67%			
Vivek Ramaswamy (withdrawn)	595	0.31%			
Ryan Binkley (withdrawn)	580	0.30%			
Asa Hutchinson (withdrawn)	519	0.27%			
Rachel Swift	335	0.17%			
David Stuckenberg	210	0.11%			
Total:	192,168	100.00%	47		47

=== Connecticut ===
Connecticut Republican primary, April 2, 2024
Candidate	Votes	Percentage	Actual delegate count		
Candidate	Votes	Percentage	Bound	Unbound	Total
Donald Trump	34,750	77.88%	28	0	28
Nikki Haley (withdrawn)	6,229	13.96%	0	0	0
Uncommitted	2,166	4.85%	0	0	0
Ron DeSantis (withdrawn)	1,289	2.89%	0	0	0
Ryan Binkley (withdrawn)	184	0.41%	0	0	0
Total:	44,618	100.00%	28	0	28

=== New York ===
New York Republican primary, April 2, 2024
Candidate	Votes	Percentage	Actual delegate count		
Candidate	Votes	Percentage	Bound	Unbound	Total
Donald Trump	132,698	81.2%	91		91
Nikki Haley (withdrawn)	21,145	12.9%			
Chris Christie (withdrawn)	6,679	4.1%			
Vivek Ramaswamy (withdrawn)	1,667	1.0%			
Blank or void ballots	1,311	0.8%			
Total:	163,500	100.0%	91		91

=== Rhode Island ===
Rhode Island Republican primary, April 2, 2024
Candidate	Votes	Percentage	Actual delegate count		
Candidate	Votes	Percentage	Bound	Unbound	Total
Donald Trump	10,898	84.5%	17		17
Nikki Haley (withdrawn)	1,371	10.6%	2		2
Uncommitted	257	2.0%			
Ron DeSantis (withdrawn)	178	1.4%			
Chris Christie (withdrawn)	154	1.2%			
Vivek Ramaswamy (withdrawn)	40	0.3%			
Total:	12,898	100.0%	19		19

=== Wisconsin ===
Wisconsin Republican primary, April 2, 2024
Candidate	Votes	Percentage	Actual delegate count		
Candidate	Votes	Percentage	Bound	Unbound	Total
Donald Trump	477,103	78.97%	41	0	0
Nikki Haley (withdrawn)	76,841	12.72%	0	0	0
Ron DeSantis (withdrawn)	20,124	3.33%	0	0	0
Uninstructed	13,057	2.16%	0	0	0
Chris Christie (withdrawn)	9,771	1.62%	0	0	0
Vivek Ramaswamy (withdrawn)	5,200	0.86%	0	0	0
Write-ins	2,081	0.34%	0	0	0
Total:	604,177	100.00%	41	0	41

=== Puerto Rico ===
Puerto Rico Republican primary, April 21, 2024
Candidate	Votes	Percentage	Actual delegate count		
Candidate	Votes	Percentage	Bound	Unbound	Total
Donald Trump	992	96.22%	23	0	23
Write-in votes	39	3.78%	0	0	0
Total:	1,031	100.00%	23	0	23

=== Pennsylvania ===
Pennsylvania Republican primary, April 23, 2024
Candidate	Votes	Percentage	Actual delegate count		
Candidate	Votes	Percentage	Bound	Unbound	Total
Donald Trump	794,048	83.35%	16	46	67
Nikki Haley (withdrawn)	158,672	16.65%			
Unprojected delegates:				5	
Total:	952,720	100.00%	16	51	67

=== Indiana ===
Indiana Republican primary, May 7, 2024
Candidate	Votes	Percentage	Actual delegate count		
Candidate	Votes	Percentage	Bound	Unbound	Total
Donald Trump	461,678	78.3%	58		
Nikki Haley (withdrawn)	128,170	21.7%			
Total:	589,848	100.0%	58		58

=== Maryland ===
Maryland Republican primary, May 14, 2024
Candidate	Votes	Percentage	Actual delegate count		
Candidate	Votes	Percentage	Bound	Unbound	Total
Donald Trump	205,996	77.7%	37	0	37
Nikki Haley (withdrawn)	56,506	21.3%	0	0	0
Uncommitted	2,607	1.0%	0	0	0
Total:	265,109	100.0%	37	0	37

=== Nebraska ===
Nebraska Republican primary, May 14, 2024
Candidate	Votes	Percentage	Actual delegate count		
Candidate	Votes	Percentage	Bound	Unbound	Total
Donald Trump	167,968	79.94%	36		36
Nikki Haley (withdrawn)	38,246	18.20%			
Perry Johnson (withdrawn)	3,902	1.86%			
Total:	211,787	100.00%	36		36

=== West Virginia ===
West Virginia Republican primary, May 14, 2024
Candidate	Votes	Percentage	Actual delegate count		
Candidate	Votes	Percentage	Bound	Unbound	Total
Donald Trump	199,497	88.4%	32		32
Nikki Haley (withdrawn)	21,231	9.4%			
Rachel Swift	2,326	1.0%			
Ryan Binkley (withdrawn)	1,481	0.7%			
David Stuckenberg	1,168	0.5%			
Total:	225,703	100.0%	32		32

=== Kentucky ===
Kentucky Republican primary, May 21, 2024
Candidate	Votes	Percentage	Actual delegate count		
Candidate	Votes	Percentage	Bound	Unbound	Total
Donald Trump	215,044	85.0%	46		46
Nikki Haley (withdrawn)	16,232	6.4%			
Uncommitted	8,984	3.5%			
Ron DeSantis (withdrawn)	7,803	3.1%			
Chris Christie (withdrawn)	2,461	1.0%			
Vivek Ramaswamy (withdrawn)	1,640	0.7%			
Ryan Binkley (withdrawn)	900	0.4%			
Total:	253,064	100.0%	46		46

=== Montana ===
Montana Republican primary, June 4, 2024
Candidate	Votes	Percentage	Actual delegate count		
Candidate	Votes	Percentage	Bound	Unbound	Total
Donald Trump	165,678	90.9%	31	0	31
No Preference	16,570	9.1%	0	0	0
Total:	182,248	100.00%	31	0	31

=== New Jersey ===
New Jersey Republican primary, June 4, 2024
Candidate	Votes	Percentage	Actual delegate count		
Candidate	Votes	Percentage	Bound	Unbound	Total
Donald Trump	294,658	96.7%	12	0	12
Write-in votes	9,915	3.3%	0	0	0
Total:	304,573	100.00%	12	0	12

=== New Mexico ===
New Mexico Republican primary, June 4, 2024
Candidate	Votes	Percentage	Actual delegate count		
Candidate	Votes	Percentage	Bound	Unbound	Total
Donald Trump	78,999	84.5%	22	0	22
Nikki Haley (withdrawn)	8,054	8.6%	0	0	0
Uncommitted	3,130	3.3%	0	0	0
Chris Christie (withdrawn)	2,428	2.6%	0	0	0
Vivek Ramaswamy (withdrawn)	886	0.9%	0	0	0
Total:	93,497	100.00%	22	0	22

== See also ==
- Results of the 2024 Democratic Party presidential primaries
- Results of the 2020 Republican Party presidential primaries
