= 2024 Vermont Republican presidential primary =

- March 5, 2024

17 Republican National Convention delegates
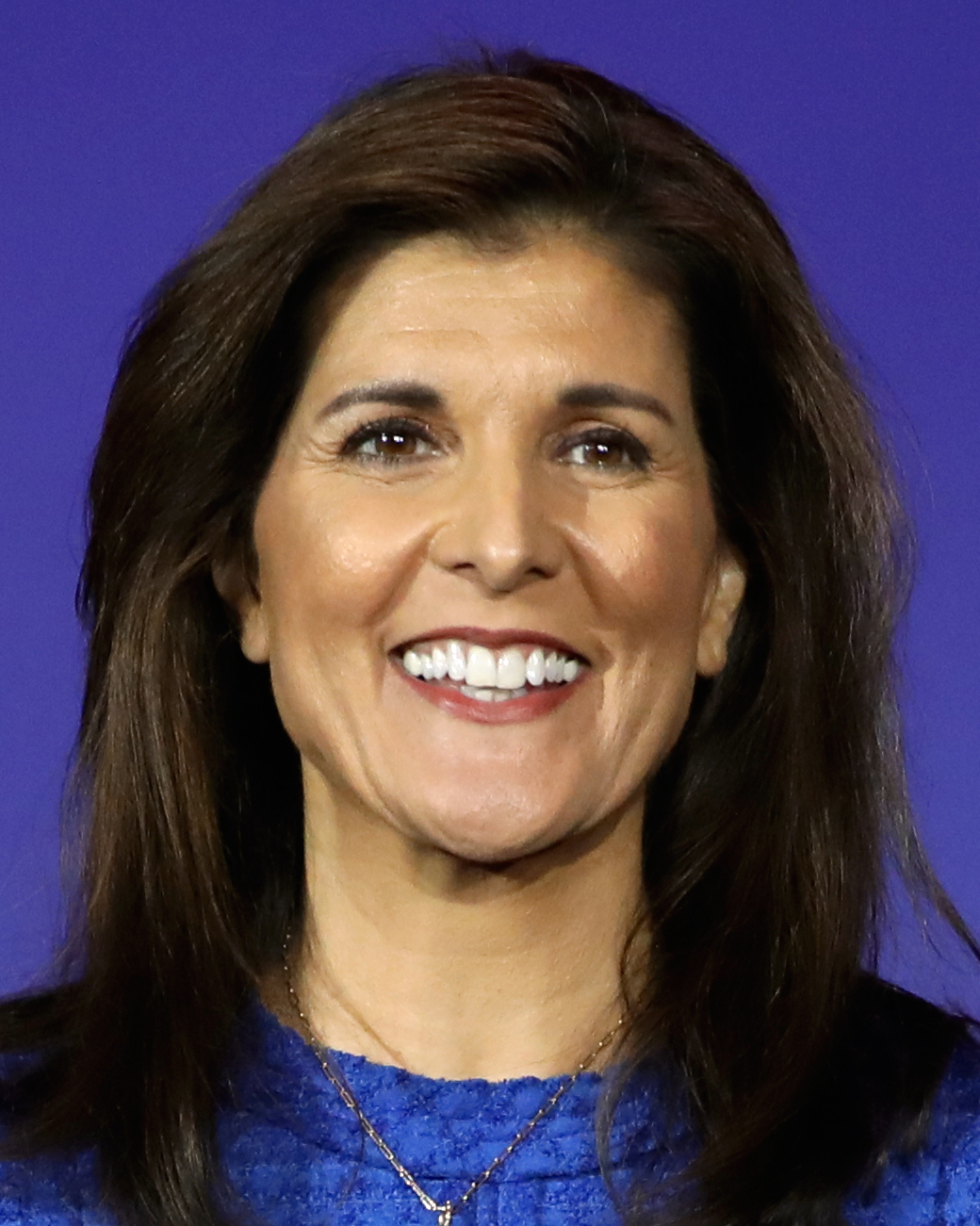

| Candidate | Nikki Haley | Donald Trump |
| Home state | South Carolina | Florida |
| Delegate count | 9 | 8 |
| Popular vote | 36,241 | 33,162 |
| Percentage | 49.32% | 45.13% |

Haley
40 – 50%
50 – 60%
60 – 70%
70 – 80%
80 – 90%
>90%
Trump
40 – 50%
50 – 60%
60 – 70%
70 – 80%
80 – 90%
Tie/No votes
40 – 50%
No votes

The 2024 Vermont Republican presidential primary was held on March 5, 2024, as part of the Republican Party primaries for the 2024 presidential election. 17 delegates to the 2024 Republican National Convention were allocated on a winner-take-most basis. The contest was held on Super Tuesday alongside primaries in 14 other states. Nikki Haley won the primary against Donald Trump, making her the first woman to win a state in a Republican presidential primary, and first nonwhite woman to win a presidential primary of a major party.

Haley was awarded nine delegates and Trump was awarded eight delegates. Haley won Chittenden County, Grand Isle County, Lamoille County, Washington County, Addison County, Windsor County, and Windham County. Trump won Franklin County, Orleans County, Essex County, Caledonia County, Orange County, Rutland County, and Bennington County. Analysts attributed Haley's win to Vermont's open primary system, which allows any registered voter to vote in the Republican nominating contest, which allowed many Democrats to vote for her in the primary.

This was the first Republican primary since 2000 in which Vermont did not vote for the winner of the nomination.

The Vermont primary was the only state primary, and one of only two primaries along with the District of Columbia primary, of the 2024 Republican presidential primaries that Donald Trump lost.

== Candidates ==
The following candidates filed:

- Donald Trump
- Nikki Haley
- Ryan Binkley (withdrew on February 27, 2024)
- Ron DeSantis (withdrew on January 21, 2024)
- Vivek Ramaswamy (withdrew on January 15, 2024)
- Chris Christie (withdrew on January 10, 2024)

== Endorsements ==
Nikki Haley

Governors

- Phil Scott, Governor of Vermont (2017–present)
- Jim Douglas, former Governor of Vermont (2003–2011)

State Representatives

- Patricia McCoy, Minority Leader of the Vermont House of Representatives (2019–present) from Rutland-1 (2015–present)
- Ashley Bartley, (2023–present) from Franklin-1
Donald Trump

Notable individual

- Randy Quaid, actor

== Polling ==
| Poll source | Date(s) administered | Sample size (Note: Key: A – all adults RV – registered voters LV – likely voters V – unclear) | Margin of error | Chris Christie | Ron DeSantis | Nikki Haley | Donald Trump | Vivek Ramaswamy | Other | Undecided |
|---|---|---|---|---|---|---|---|---|---|---|
| University of New Hampshire | February 15–19, 2024 | 309 (LV) | ± 5.6% | – | – | 31% | 61% | – | 6% | 2% |
| University of New Hampshire | January 4–8, 2024 | 242 (LV) | ± 6.3% | 9% | 3% | 19% | 47% | 2% | 3% | 17% |

== Results ==
Vermont Republican primary, March 5, 2024
| Candidate | Votes | Percentage | Actual delegate count | | |
| Candidate | Votes | Percentage | Bound | Unbound | Total |
|---|---|---|---|---|---|
| Nikki Haley | 36,241 | 49.32% | 9 | | 9 |
| Donald Trump | 33,162 | 45.13% | 8 | | 8 |
| Chris Christie (withdrawn) | 1,020 | 1.39% | | | |
| Ron DeSantis (withdrawn) | 949 | 1.29% | | | |
| Write-in votes | 586 | 0.80% | | | |
| Vivek Ramaswamy (withdrawn) | 546 | 0.74% | | | |
| Ryan Binkley (withdrawn) | 278 | 0.38% | | | |
| Overvotes | 51 | 0.07% | | | |
| Blank ballots | 654 | 0.89% | | | |
| Total: | 73,487 | 100.00% | 17 | | 17 |

=== Results by county ===
2024 Vermont Republican presidential primary (results per county)
| County | Nikki Haley | | Donald Trump | | Chris Christie | | Ron DeSantis | | Vivek Ramaswamy | | Ryan L. Binkley | | Write-in | | Overvotes | | Blank Votes | | Total votes cast |
| County | Votes | % | Votes | % | Votes | % | Votes | % | Votes | % | Votes | % | Votes | % | Votes | % | Votes | % | Total votes cast |
|---|---|---|---|---|---|---|---|---|---|---|---|---|---|---|---|---|---|---|---|
| Addison | 2,569 | 51.74% | 2,095 | 42.20% | 76 | 1.53% | 78 | 1.57% | 36 | 0.73% | 22 | 0.44% | 59 | 1.19% | 1 | 0.02% | 29 | 0.58% | 4,965 |
| Bennington | 1,743 | 42.03% | 2,079 | 50.13% | 77 | 1.86% | 69 | 1.66% | 63 | 1.52% | 14 | 0.34% | 32 | 0.77% | 1 | 0.02% | 69 | 1.66% | 4,147 |
| Caledonia | 1,420 | 42.51% | 1,724 | 51.62% | 41 | 1.23% | 40 | 1.20% | 21 | 0.63% | 19 | 0.57% | 26 | 0.78% | 0 | 0.00% | 49 | 1.47% | 3,340 |
| Chittenden | 10,158 | 61.23% | 5,626 | 33.91% | 247 | 1.49% | 164 | 0.99% | 103 | 0.62% | 49 | 0.3% | 138 | 0.83% | 9 | 0.05% | 96 | 0.58% | 16,590 |
| Essex | 346 | 32.46% | 667 | 62.57% | 12 | 1.13% | 7 | 0.66% | 10 | 0.94% | 2 | 0.19% | 4 | 0.38% | 2 | 0.19% | 16 | 1.50% | 1,066 |
| Franklin | 2,646 | 41.23% | 3,446 | 53.69% | 69 | 1.08% | 82 | 1.28% | 40 | 0.62% | 29 | 0.45% | 33 | 0.51% | 4 | 0.06% | 69 | 1.08% | 6,418 |
| Grand Isle | 739 | 49.40% | 697 | 46.59% | 15 | 1.00% | 16 | 1.07% | 7 | 0.47% | 2 | 0.13% | 14 | 0.94% | 0 | 0.00% | 6 | 0.40% | 1,496 |
| Lamoille | 1,398 | 56.48% | 964 | 38.95% | 25 | 1.01% | 25 | 1.01% | 18 | 0.73% | 5 | 0.20% | 17 | 0.69% | 1 | 0.04% | 22 | 0.89% | 2,475 |
| Orange | 1,558 | 46.81% | 1,605 | 48.23% | 39 | 1.17% | 43 | 1.29% | 17 | 0.51% | 15 | 0.45% | 24 | 0.72% | 7 | 0.21% | 20 | 0.60% | 3,328 |
| Orleans | 985 | 36.54% | 1,562 | 57.94% | 22 | 0.82% | 52 | 1.93% | 14 | 0.52% | 12 | 0.45% | 25 | 0.93% | 0 | 0.00% | 24 | 0.89% | 2,696 |
| Rutland | 3,599 | 37.99% | 5,310 | 56.05% | 116 | 1.22% | 155 | 1.64% | 67 | 0.71% | 29 | 0.31% | 91 | 0.96% | 11 | 0.12% | 96 | 1.01% | 9,474 |
| Washington | 3,776 | 54.40% | 2,710 | 39.04% | 138 | 1.99% | 113 | 1.63% | 56 | 0.81% | 26 | 0.37% | 49 | 0.71% | 6 | 0.09% | 67 | 0.97% | 6,941 |
| Windham | 1,762 | 47.98% | 1,694 | 46.13% | 59 | 1.61% | 40 | 1.09% | 38 | 1.03% | 18 | 0.49% | 23 | 0.63% | 4 | 0.11% | 34 | 0.93% | 3,672 |
| Windsor | 3,542 | 51.49% | 2,983 | 43.36% | 84 | 1.22% | 65 | 0.94% | 56 | 0.81% | 36 | 0.52% | 51 | 0.74% | 5 | 0.07% | 57 | 0.83% | 6,879 |
| Total | 36,241 | 49.32% | 33,162 | 45.13% | 1,020 | 1.39% | 949 | 1.29% | 546 | 0.74% | 278 | 0.38% | 586 | 0.80% | 51 | 0.07% | 654 | 0.89% | 73,487 |

== See also ==
- 2024 Republican Party presidential primaries
- 2024 Vermont Democratic presidential primary
- 2024 United States presidential election
- 2024 United States presidential election in Vermont
- 2024 United States elections
