= 2024 Virginia Republican presidential primary =

Presidential electoral process in Virginia

- March 5, 2024

48 Republican National Convention delegates

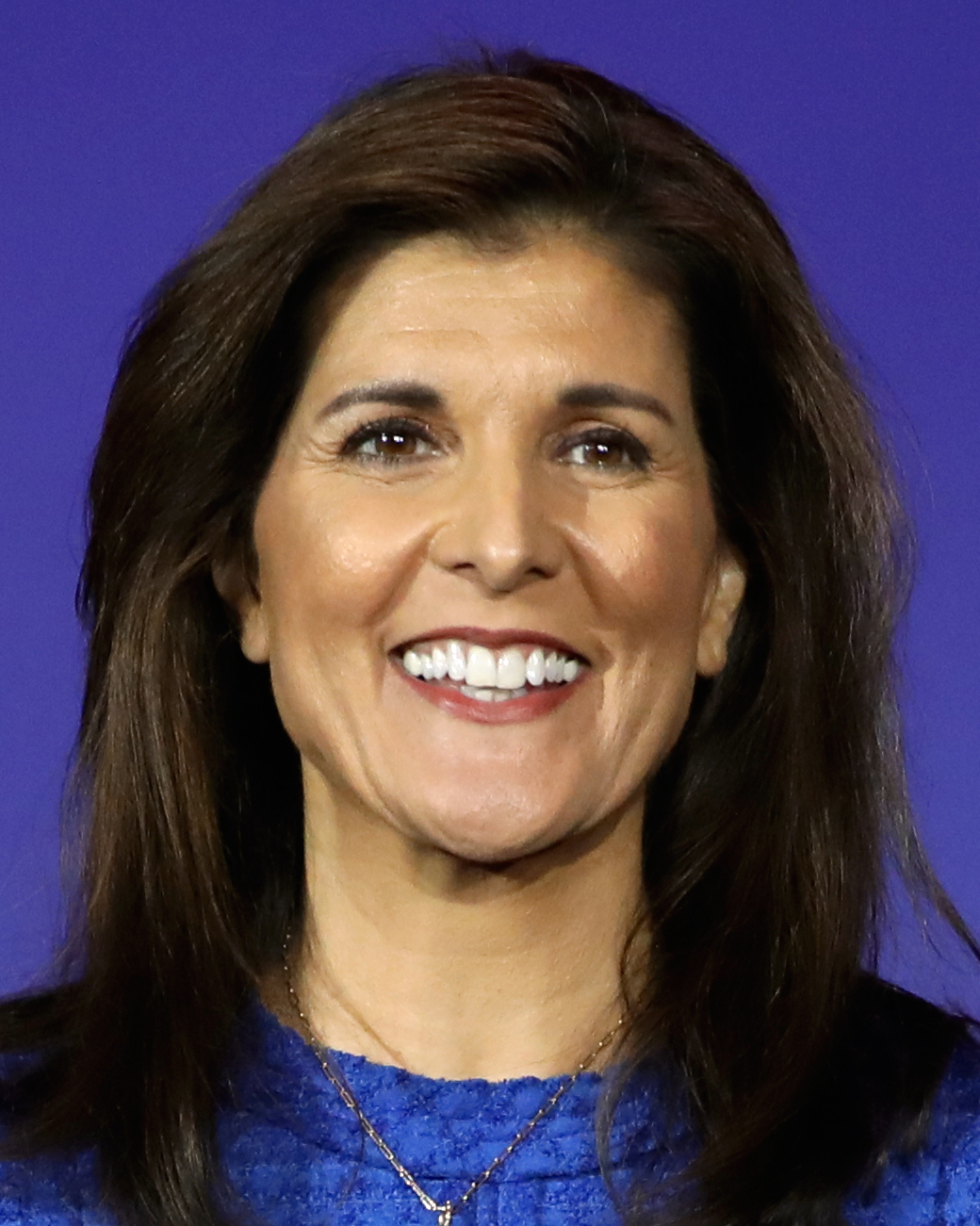
Candidate	Donald Trump	Nikki Haley
Home state	Florida	South Carolina
Delegate count	42	6
Popular vote	440,416	244,586
Percentage	62.99%	34.98%

Trump
40 – 50%
50 – 60%
60 – 70%
70 – 80%
80 – 90%
90 – 100%
Haley
40 – 50%
50 – 60%
60 – 70%
70 – 80%
80 – 90%
90 – 100%
Tie
40 – 50%

The 2024 Virginia Republican presidential primary was held on March 5, 2024, as part of the Republican Party primaries for the 2024 presidential election. 48 delegates to the 2024 Republican National Convention will be allocated on a proportional basis. The contest was held on Super Tuesday alongside primaries in 14 other states. Appearing on the ballot are Donald Trump, Nikki Haley, Ryan Binkley, Ron DeSantis, Chris Christie, and Vivek Ramaswamy.

Donald Trump won the Virginia primary. Nikki Haley received the majority of votes in Albemarle, Arlington and Fairfax Counties, as well as the Independent Cities of Alexandria, Charlottesville, Fairfax and Richmond.

== Endorsements ==
Ron DeSantis (withdrawn)

Former federal executive officials

- Ken Cuccinelli, Acting U.S. Deputy Secretary of Homeland Security (2019–2021); Acting Director of U.S. Citizenship and Immigration Services (2019–2021); Attorney General of Virginia (2010–2014); nominee for Governor of Virginia in 2013
- Marc Thiessen, White House Director of Speechwriting (2007–2009)

U.S. Representative

- Bob Good, VA-05 (2021–2025) (switched endorsement to Trump following DeSantis suspending his campaign)
Nikki Haley

Former U.S. Representatives

- Barbara Comstock, VA-10 (2015–2019)
- Tom Davis, VA-11 (1995–2008)

State Delegate

- Carrie Coyner, 62nd District (2020-2024), 75th District (2024-present)

Notable individual

- Susan Allen, First Lady of Virginia (1994-1998)
Donald Trump

Federal executive officials

- Gary Bauer, Under Secretary of Education (1985–1987)
- Jim Gilmore, U.S. Ambassador to the Organization for Security and Cooperation in Europe (2019–2021); Governor of Virginia (1998–2002)
- Keith Kellogg, Acting U.S. National Security Advisor (2017)

U.S. Representatives

- Ben Cline, VA-06 (2019–present)
- Bob Good, VA-05 (2021–2025) (previously endorsed Ron DeSantis)
- Morgan Griffith, VA-09 (2011–present)
- Scott Taylor, VA-02 (2017–2019)
- Rob Wittman, VA-01 (2007–present)

State senators

- Emily Brewer, 17th District (2024–present)
- Charles Carrico Sr., 40th District (2012–2020)
- Amanda Chase, 11th District (2016–2024); candidate for Governor in 2021
- Christie Craig, 19th District (2024–present)
- Bill DeSteph, 20th District (2024–present), 8th District (2016–2024)
- Danny Diggs, 1st District (2024–present)
- Tara Durant, 27th District (2024–present)
- Travis Hackworth, 5th District (2024–present), 38th District (2021–2024)
- Chris Head, 3rd District (2024–present)
- John McGuire, 10th District (2024–present)
- Tammy Brankley Mulchi, 9th District (2024–present)
- Mark Peake, 8th District (2024–present), 22nd District (2017–2024)
- Todd Pillion, 40th District (2024–present), 6th District (2020–2024)
- Bryce Reeves, 28th District (2024–present), 17th District (2012–2024)
- Bill Stanley, 7th District (2024–present), 20th District (2012–2024), 19th District (2011–2012)
- Glen Sturtevant, 12th District (2024–present), 10th District (2016–2020)

State delegates

- Jed Arnold, 46th District (2024–present), 6th District (2023–2024)
- Ellen Campbell, 86th District (2024–present), 91st District (2023–2024)
- A.C. Cordoza, 36th District (2024–present), 24th District (2022–2024)
- Will Davis, 39th District (2024–present)
- Baxter Ennis, 89th District (2024–present)
- Buddy Fowler, 59th District (2024–present), 55th District (2014–2024)
- Tom Garrett, 56th District (2024–present); U.S. Representative from VA-05 (2017–2019)
- Todd Gilbert, Minority Leader of the Virginia House of Delegates (2020–2022, 2024–present); 33rd District (2024–present), 15th District (2006–2024)
- Chad Green, 69th District (2024–present)
- Tim Griffin, 53rd District (2024–present)
- Terry Kilgore, Majority Leader of the Virginia House of Delegates (2022–2024); 45th District (2024–present), 1st District (1994–2024)
- Will Morefield, 43rd District (2024–present), 3rd District (2010–2024)
- Delores Riley Oates, 31st District (2024–present)
- Eric Phillips, 48th District (2024–present)
- Chris Runion, 35th District (2024–present), 25th District (2020–2024)
- Phillip Scott, 63rd District (2024–present), 88th District (2022–2024)
- Wendell Walker, 52nd District (2024–present), 23rd District (2020–2024)
- Bill Wiley, 32nd District (2024–present), 29th District (2020–2024)
- Wren Williams, 47th District (2024–present), 9th District (2022–2024)
- Tony Wilt, 34th District (2024–present), 26th District (2010–2024)
- Tommy Wright, 50th District (2024–present), 61st District (2001–2024)
- Scott Wyatt (politician), 60th District (2024–present), 97th District (2020–2024)
- Eric Zehr, 51st District (2024–present)

Notable individuals

- Jerry Falwell Jr., Liberty University president (2007–2020)
- Chris LaCivita, political consultant
- Ned Ryun, American Majority CEO
Declined to endorse

Governor

- Glenn Youngkin, Governor of Virginia (2022–2026)

== Maps ==
Endorsements by incumbent Republicans in the Virginia Senate. Endorsed Donald Trump (14) No endorsement (5)

== Results ==
Virginia Republican primary, March 5, 2024
Candidate	Votes	Percentage	Actual delegate count		
Candidate	Votes	Percentage	Bound	Unbound	Total
Donald Trump	440,416	62.99%	39	3	42
Nikki Haley	244,586	34.98%	6		6
Ron DeSantis (withdrawn)	7,494	1.07%			
Chris Christie (withdrawn)	3,384	0.48%			
Vivek Ramaswamy (withdrawn)	2,503	0.36%			
Ryan Binkley (withdrawn)	853	0.12%			
Total:	699,236	100.00%	45	3	48

=== Results by congressional district ===
Trump won 9 of the 11 congressional districts.

District	Trump	Haley	Others
1st	61.2%	37.0%	1.8%
2nd	68.0%	30.3%	1.7%
3rd	65.3%	32.6%	2.1%
4th	66.5%	31.2%	2.3%
5th	71.5%	26.6%	1.8%
6th	72.7%	25.3%	2.0%
7th	69.1%	28.6%	2.3%
8th	31.3%	66.2%	2.5%
9th	81.1%	17.4%	1.5%
10th	57.8%	39.7%	2.4%
11th	40.5%	57.0%	2.5%
Source: "Presidential Primary Results by Congressional District". The Virginia Public Access Project.

== Polling ==
Poll source	Date(s) administered	Sample size (Note: Key: A – all adults RV – registered voters LV – likely voters V – unclear)	Margin of error	Doug Burgum	Chris Christie	Ron DeSantis	Larry Elder	Nikki Haley	Asa Hutchinson	Mike Pence	Vivek Ramaswamy	Tim Scott	Donald Trump	Glenn Youngkin	Other	Undecided
Roanoke College	Feb 11–19, 2024	392 (LV)	± 4.6%	–	–	–	–	43%	–	–	–	–	51%	–	–	–
Morning Consult	Jan 23 – February 4, 2024	436 (LV)	–	–	–	–	–	19%	–	–	–	–	78%	–	–	–
Morning Consult	Nov 1–30, 2023	942(LV)	–	0%	5%	14%	–	9%	–	–	7%	1%	63%	–	–	1%
Roanoke College	Nov 12–20, 2023	686 (A)	± 4.3%	0%	2%	14%	–	10%	–	–	3%	1%	51%	10%	–	9%
Morning Consult	Oct 1–31, 2023	942 (LV)	–	0%	3%	10%	–	8%	0%	5%	8%	3%	63%	–	0% (Note: Will Hurd with 0%)	–
Morning Consult	Sep 1–30, 2023	896 (LV)	–	0%	3%	14%	–	6%	0%	4%	9%	1%	61%	–	0% (Note: Will Hurd with 0%)	2%
Morning Consult	Aug 1–31, 2023	947 (LV)	–	0%	4%	15%	–	3%	1%	5%	10%	2%	59%	–	0% (Note: Will Hurd and Francis Suarez with 0%)	1%
Roanoke College	Aug 6–15, 2023	702 (A)	± 4.2%	–	3%	13%	1%	2%	1%	7%	5%	6%	47%	9%	6% (Note: "Someone else" with 6%)	2%
Morning Consult	July 1–31, 2023	1,044(LV)	–	0%	4%	20%	–	4%	0%	7%	7%	3%	55%	–	0% (Note: Francis Suarez with 0%)	–
Morning Consult	June 1–30, 2023	919 (LV)	–	0%	2%	19%	–	5%	0%	7%	3%	3%	60%	–	0% (Note: Liz Cheney, Kristi Noem, and Greg Abbott with 0%)	1%
Morning Consult	May 1–31, 2023	969 (LV)	–	–	–	21%	–	3%	0%	6%	3%	2%	59%	3%	3% (Note: Liz Cheney with 2%; Kristi Noem with 1%; Greg Abbott with 0%)	–
Roanoke College	May 14–23, 2023	678 (A)	± 4.4%	–	–	28%	1%	7%	1%	7%	–	1%	48%	–	3% (Note: Chris Sununu with 1%; "Someone else" with 2%)	4%
Morning Consult	Apr 1–30, 2023	870 (LV)	–	–	–	20%	–	3%	0%	6%	2%	1%	59%	6%	3% (Note: Liz Cheney with 2%; Kristi Noem, Greg Abbott and Mike Pompeo with 0%)	1%
Morning Consult	Mar 1–31, 2023	921 (LV)	–	–	–	26%	–	3%	–	6%	1%	0%	50%	9%	3% (Note: Liz Cheney with 2%; Kristi Noem with 1%; Greg Abbott and Mike Pompeo with 0%)	2%
Morning Consult	Feb 1–28, 2023	721 (LV)	–	–	–	31%	–	4%	–	6%	1%	1%	47%	9%	1% (Note: Liz Cheney with 1%; Ted Cruz, Kristi Noem, and Mike Pompeo with 0%)	–
Differentiators	Feb 21–24, 2023	500 (LV)	± 4.5%	–	–	37%	–	6%	–	3%	2%	–	34%	6%	7% (Note: Larry Hogan with 5%; Mike Pompeo with 2%)	5%
Differentiators	Feb 21–24, 2023	500 (LV)	± 4.5%	–	–	54%	–	–	–	–	–	–	37%	–	–	9%
Differentiators	Feb 21–24, 2023	500 (LV)	± 4.5%	–	–	65%	–	–	–	–	–	–	–	27%	–	8%
Differentiators	Feb 21–24, 2023	500 (LV)	± 4.5%	–	–	–	–	–	–	–	–	–	52%	42%	–	6%
Roanoke College	Feb 12–21, 2023	680 (A)	± 4.2%	–	–	28%	–	5%	–	3%	–	–	39%	6%	6% (Note: Donald Trump Jr. with 3%; Ted Cruz with 2%; Marco Rubio with 1%)	13%
Morning Consult	Jan 1–31, 2023	1,000 (LV)	–	–	–	32%	–	2%	–	10%	–	1%	43%	8%	2% (Note: Ted Cruz and Liz Cheney with 1%; Greg Abbott, Kristi Noem, and Mike Pompeo with 0%)	2%
Morning Consult	Dec 1–31, 2022	559 (LV)	–	–	–	30%	–	2%	–	11%	–	1%	45%	7%	5% (Note: Ted Cruz with 2%; Greg Abbott, Liz Cheney, Kristi Noem with 1%; Mike Pompeo with 0%)	–
Roanoke College	Nov 13–22, 2022	652 (A)	± 4.5%	–	–	–	–	–	–	–	–	–	52%	39%	–	7%
Roanoke College	Aug 7–16, 2022	640 (A)	± 4.5%	–	–	–	–	–	–	–	–	–	62%	28%	–	9%

== See also ==
- 2024 Republican Party presidential primaries
- 2024 Virginia Democratic presidential primary
- 2024 United States presidential election
- 2024 United States presidential election in Virginia
- 2024 Virginia elections
- 2024 United States elections
