= 2024 District of Columbia Republican presidential primary =

- March 1–3, 2024

19 Republican National Convention delegates
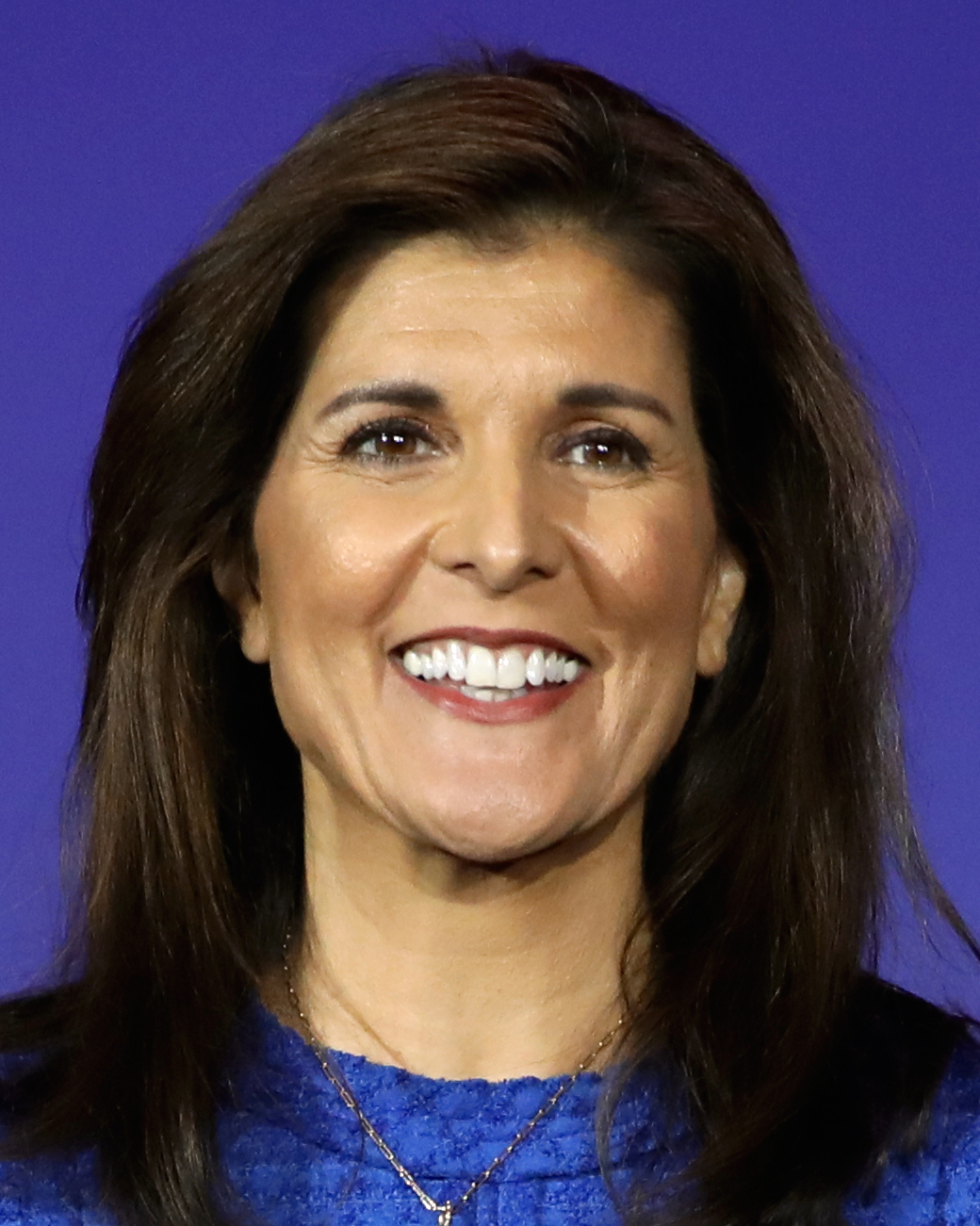

| Candidate | Nikki Haley | Donald Trump |
| Home state | South Carolina | Florida |
| Delegate count | 19 | 0 |
| Popular vote | 1,279 | 676 |
| Percentage | 62.85% | 33.22% |

The 2024 District of Columbia Republican presidential primary was held from March 1 to 3, 2024, as part of the Republican Party primaries for the 2024 presidential election. 19 delegates to the 2024 Republican National Convention were allocated on a winner-take-all basis. Nikki Haley won the primary with a nearly 30-point lead against Donald Trump, with all delegates going to her. It was Haley's first win nationwide in the primaries and marked the first time a woman won a Republican presidential primary in U.S. history. It is also the only primary Trump lost in both of his contested presidential bids.

== Procedure ==
Voting was held at the Madison Hotel in Northwest Washington from 8 a.m. to 7 p.m. EST, beginning on Friday, March 1 and concluding on Sunday, March 3. All 19 delegates allocated to the District of Columbia were awarded to the candidate who received over 50% of the vote. If no candidate received a majority, delegates would have been awarded proportionally to all candidates who earned at least 15% of the vote. The contest was a closed primary, meaning only registered party members were allowed to participate.

== Candidates ==
The filing deadline for the District of Columbia primary was on December 1, 2023. The district's Republican Party published the following list of qualified candidates:

- Nikki Haley
- David Stuckenberg
- Donald Trump
- Ryan Binkley (withdrawn)
- Doug Burgum (withdrawn)
- Chris Christie (withdrawn)
- Ron DeSantis (withdrawn)
- Vivek Ramaswamy (withdrawn)

== Campaign ==
Haley held a campaign event during the first day of the primary at its sole voting location, hosted by the District of Columbia Republican Party. At the event, she stated that she had raised more funds in January than Trump, and thus planned to stay in the race until after Super Tuesday. She also claimed to have raised $12 million in February and denied interest in running a third-party campaign as a No Labels candidate.

== Results ==
District of Columbia Republican primary, March 1–3, 2024
| Candidate | Votes | Percentage | Actual delegate count | | |
| Candidate | Votes | Percentage | Bound | Unbound | Total |
|---|---|---|---|---|---|
| Nikki Haley | 1,274 | 62.76% | 19 | 0 | 19 |
| Donald Trump | 676 | 33.30% | 0 | 0 | 0 |
| Ron DeSantis (withdrawn) | 38 | 1.87% | 0 | 0 | 0 |
| Chris Christie (withdrawn) | 18 | 0.89% | 0 | 0 | 0 |
| Vivek Ramaswamy (withdrawn) | 15 | 0.74% | 0 | 0 | 0 |
| David Stuckenberg | 8 | 0.39% | 0 | 0 | 0 |
| Ryan Binkley (withdrawn) | 1 | 0.05% | 0 | 0 | 0 |
| Total: | 2,030 | 100.00% | 19 | 0 | 19 |

== See also ==
- 2024 Republican Party presidential primaries
- 2024 United States presidential election
- 2024 United States presidential election in the District of Columbia
- 2024 United States elections
- 2008 New Hampshire Democratic presidential primary – the first time a woman won a delegate-binding primary in the Democratic presidential primaries
