= Ryan Binkley =

American businessman and politician (born 1967)

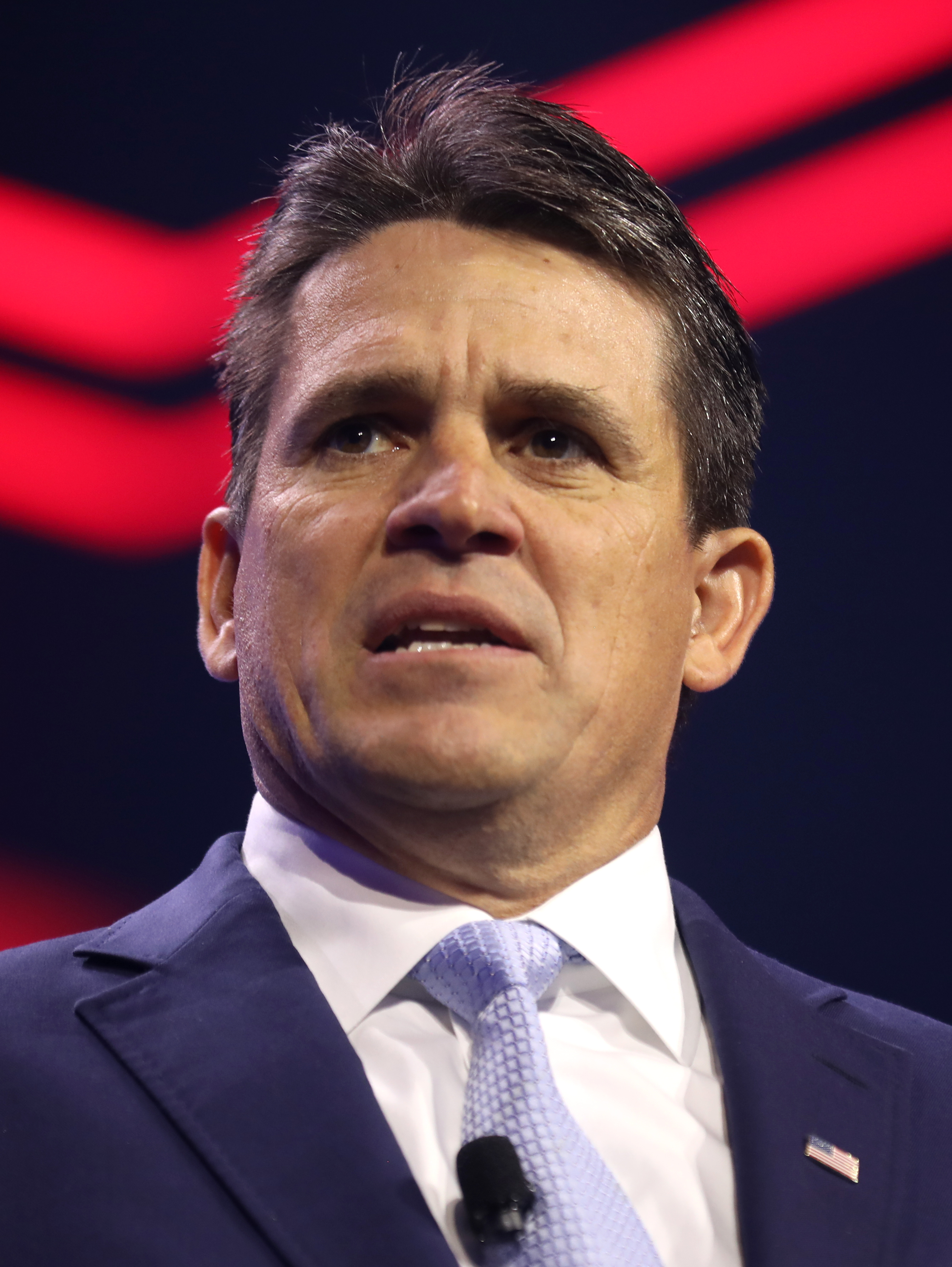
- Binkley in 2023

Personal details
- Born: Ryan Lee Binkley; November 19, 1967 (age 58) Columbus, Georgia, U.S.
- Party: Republican
- Spouse: Ellie
- Children: 5
- Education: University of Texas, Austin (BBA); Southern Methodist University (MBA)
- Website: Official website

Ryan Lee Binkley (born November 19, 1967) is an American pastor, businessman and politician. With his wife Ellie, he co-founded the Richardson, Texas-based Create Church in 2014, for which he is lead pastor. Prior, he began his career as a young adult pastor for Victory World Church in 1996, and founded Generational Group a decade later, a financial advisory firm for which he is chief executive officer (CEO).

He was a "long-shot" candidate for president of the United States in the 2024 Republican Party presidential primaries, in which he received 25,489 votes. In 2025, he announced his candidacy for Texas's 32nd congressional district in the 2026 United States House of Representatives elections. He was set to face Jace Yarbrough in a runoff, but withdrew.

== Early life and education ==
Binkley was born in Columbus, Georgia on November 19, 1967. He has a Bachelor of Business Administration in finance and marketing from the University of Texas at Austin McCombs School of Business. He also has a Master of Business Administration from Southern Methodist University's Cox School of Business. After Binkley moved to Atlanta at age 24 to pursue Christian ministry, his brother was killed by a drunk driver; Binkley said that this was what led to him returning to Texas.

== Career ==
Upon Binkley's return to Texas, he spent a year away from pastoral work and spent time working in the family business. Binkley worked for Procter & Gamble and Boston Scientific before selling his family's company and co-founding his own consulting firm, the Generational Equity Group, in 2004, which advises businesses on mergers and acquisitions. Binkley has been a franchise owner of Dave's Hot Chicken since the business's expansion to the Dallas–Fort Worth area in 2021.

After both were ordained at their local church, Binkley and his wife were sent to plant a church in Richardson, Texas in 2013. Using the church's entire savings, a plot along Central Expressway was purchased and construction on the new church building began in 2018. As of 2020, Create Church had a weekly attendance of 650 people. A new building across the street from the church was constructed for Generational Group, and Binkley reported that he split his time evenly between working in the two buildings. Binkley said that the new building was designed with "plenty of open spaces and natural lighting", with a 30-foot window meant to "bring the community inside".

== 2024 presidential campaign ==
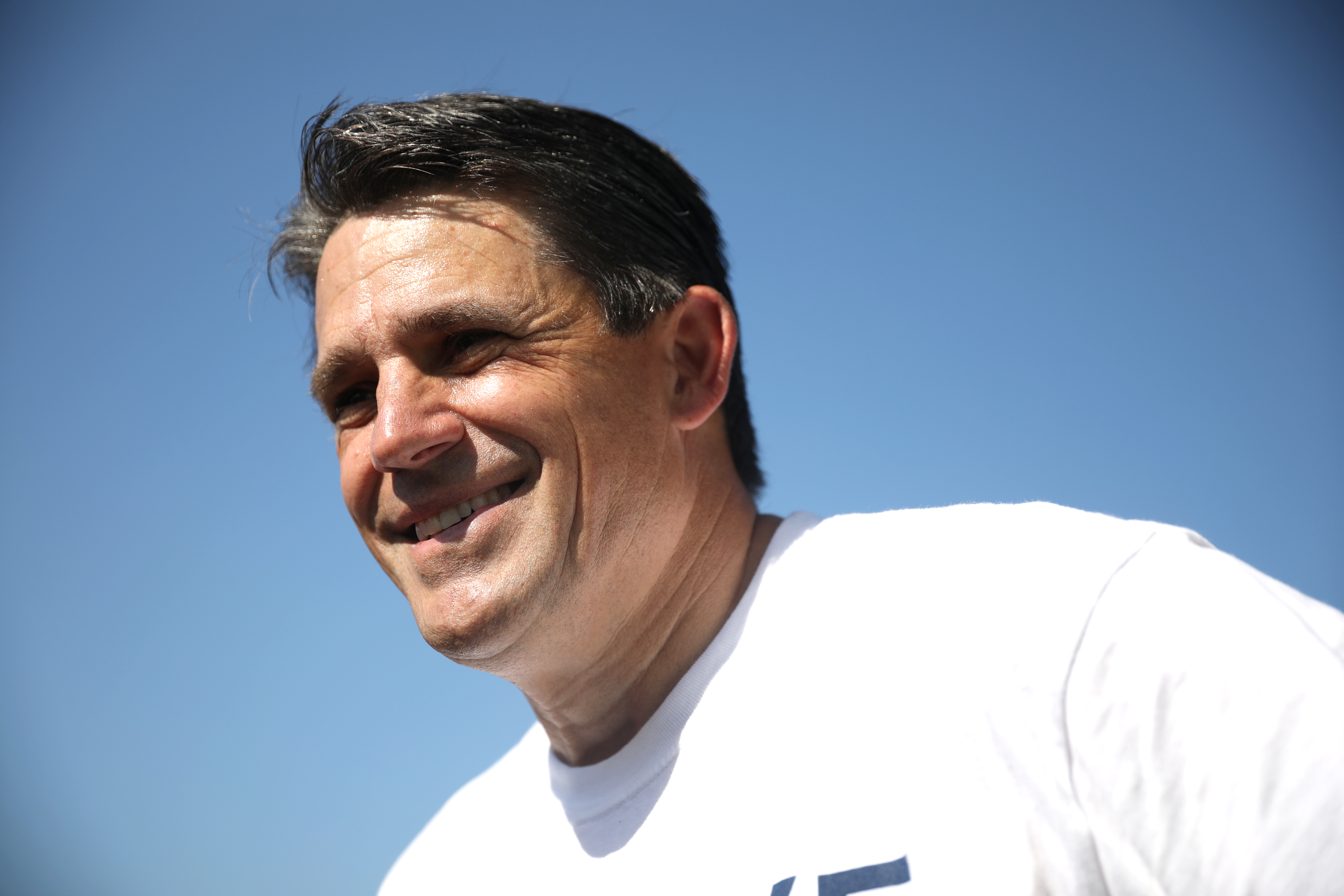
Binkley at Iowa Governor Kim Reynolds's Fair-Side Chats at the 2023 Iowa State Fair

Binkley announced in April 2023 that he would seek the party's nomination for the 2024 United States presidential election. Binkley said a divine revelation from God instructed him to run for president. He said the message from the divine came to him in 2016 telling him that the nation is in trouble. Binkley's campaign was described in May 2023 as built around "solutions for the country", with him calling himself a "uniter", criticizing both Republicans and Democrats for being overly partisan. His four major planks included balancing the federal budget, reducing health care costs, bipartisan efforts to reform immigration policy, and "revitalizing education" to encourage community involvement.

Binkley's campaign was described as a "long-shot" upon his announcement that he was running. He demonstrated trouble differentiating himself from other candidates while on the campaign trail. By the time he announced that he would drop out and endorsed Donald Trump on February 27, 2024, Binkley's campaign was considered an "[u]ltra-long-shot".

=== Iowa caucuses ===
Binkley focused much of his campaigning in Iowa, where the first caucus is held. There, he spoke with the local media and bought $250,000 in radio advertisements. He spoke at the Republican Party of Iowa's Lincoln Dinner on July 28, an important platform for candidates in the state.

Binkley largely self-funded his campaign, while also appealing for donors to help him reach the donor criteria required to participate in the 2024 Republican Party presidential debates and forums. Binkley claimed to have met the donor threshold on August 20, but had only one qualifying poll out of the four required to participate. He ultimately did not qualify for the first debate.

When asked about dropping out due to poor polling, Binkley repeatedly stated that he is continuing his candidacy through the caucuses. He was the first candidate to visit every county in Iowa, dubbed "the full Grassley". He held the third most campaign events in Iowa of any candidate. However, during the 2024 Iowa Republican presidential caucuses he received 774 votes, or 0.70% of the electorate in a distant fifth place behind Vivek Ramaswamy whose showing was so poor he dropped out of the race entirely at 8,449 votes or 7.66% of the electorate. However, Binkley celebrated the fact that he received more votes in the Iowa caucus than former Arkansas Governor Asa Hutchinson.

=== New Hampshire primary ===
After his showing in Iowa on January 12, 2024, Binkley stayed in the race despite other better-known candidates dropping out. On January 21, as Binkley retooled for the 2024 New Hampshire Republican presidential primary, The Guardian ran a story where one of their journalists attended two Binkley rallies, which only had two and four participants respectively as Binkley outlined his plans for future contests. Binkley stated he was aiming for 2-3% of the vote in New Hampshire. Binkley embraced his low-profile status, selling yard signs that say "Who is Ryan Binkley?". Binkley received 315 votes, equivalent to 0.1% of the electorate, losing to Donald Trump.

=== Nevada and Virgin Islands races ===
Binkley shifted his efforts to the 2024 Nevada Republican presidential caucuses, where he was the only registered opposition to Donald Trump, since Nikki Haley is instead competing in the 2024 Nevada Republican presidential primary. Binkley shifted his message away from religious social conservative issues to a more financially conservative position to appeal to the more libertarian-minded voters of Nevada, stating that if is elected president he would balance the budget and pay off all foreign debt in one term. A report in The Nevada Independent on January 24 predicted that he would not do much better than he did in New Hampshire.

As of January 24, Binkley had spent $8 million of his own money to fund his campaign. Due to Binkley being Trump's only opponent, there was a spike in media interest in his campaign, with Newsweek, USA Today, and Deseret News running articles about him and his positions. Binkley received 536 votes in Nevada, or 0.9% of the vote, coming in a distant second place to Donald Trump with the remaining 99.1% or 59,545 votes. Binkley did not run in the Virgin Islands caucuses.

=== South Carolina primary ===
Binkley was one of five candidates on the 2024 South Carolina Republican presidential primary ballot. Binkley traveled to South Carolina a week ahead of the primary to campaign, starting on February 15, centering on his evangelical Protestant upbringing and job as a pastor, while also running on a platform of "reclaiming" cities and urban areas from the Democrats, stating that "[The Republican Party doesn't] have a message for the poor, immigrants, for the changing multicultural electorate for our country, which is growing, and young people. I do." Binkley would receive 527 votes, or 0.1% of the electorate.

=== Michigan primary ===
Binkley started campaigning on February 25 for the February 27 primary, prioritizing fiscal responsibility and paying off the national debt in his campaigning in the state. He suspended his campaign on the day of the Michigan primary and endorsed Trump.

== 2026 congressional campaign ==
On August 6, 2025, Binkley announced that he would run to represent Texas's 32nd congressional district in 2026. He finished a distant second to Jace Yarbrough in the Republican primary on March 3, 2026. Binkley and Yarbrough would have advanced to a runoff, but Binkley withdrew his candidacy two weeks later.

== Political views ==
=== Racial justice ===
Binkley participated in Iowa's Brown & Black Presidential Forum in January 2024, the only Republican candidate to do so. He said he attended because of a "deep need for reconciliation in our nation, not just politically, economically, but certainly racially." He also said the Republican Party needed better outreach to minorities, young voters, and major cities. In campaign stops, Binkley said Republicans should develop messages for "the poor, immigrants, [and] the changing multicultural electorate," and do more in urban areas. At the Iowa State Fair in August 2023, he noted that about 40% of Americans belong to a racial minority and urged the party to adapt.

=== Donald Trump ===
Binkley ran against Donald Trump in the 2024 Republican primaries. He announced his candidacy in April 2023 and said he could defeat Trump despite no prior elected office. His campaign focused on unity and bipartisanship. Binkley said no Republican since Ronald Reagan had bridged partisan divides and that Trump's leadership had not fixed issues like health care, support for the working poor, or national division. He said Trump's continued role would mean "the division in our country is going to continue," pointing to divisive rhetoric and lack of emphasis on unity. When Binkley suspended his 2024 campaign, he endorsed Trump.

== Personal life ==
His wife, Ellie, was born in South Korea. The two were married at Victory World Church in Georgia in the late 1990s. They have five children. Binkley is a major donor to Baylor University, where two of his children attend.

In 2019, the Hugh O'Brian Youth Leadership Foundation awarded Binkley with the Albert Schweitzer Leadership Award for "exemplary leadership professionally and personally". Binkley and Generational Group have contributed donations to organizations supporting Dallas youth and families in Uganda and Tanzania. He has also received industry awards for his work with Generational Group.
