= Nationwide opinion polling for the 2024 Republican Party presidential primaries =

This is a list of nationwide public opinion polls that have been conducted relating to the Republican primaries for the 2024 United States presidential election. The persons named in the polls are declared candidates or have received media speculation about their possible candidacy. The polls included are among Republicans or Republicans and Republican-leaning independents. If multiple versions of polls are provided, the version among likely voters is prioritized, then registered voters, then adults.

== Background ==
Active campaign	Exploratory committee	Withdrawn candidate	Republican National Convention
Midterm elections	Debates	Primaries	Republican National Convention

In December 2023, the Colorado Supreme Court rejected the presidential eligibility of Donald Trump, the former president of the United States and a candidate in the 2024 presidential election, on the basis of his actions during the January 6 Capitol attack. The Colorado Supreme Court held that Trump's actions before and during the attack constituted engaging in insurrection; the Fourteenth Amendment disqualifies presidential candidates who have engaged in insurrection against the United States.

On March 4, 2024, the U.S. Supreme Court unanimously reversed the Colorado Supreme Court's ruling in Trump v. Anderson.

== Nationwide polling ==
Local regression graph of all polls conducted since January 2023.

=== Aggregate polls ===
Source of poll aggregation	Dates administered	Dates updated	Nikki Haley	Donald Trump	Other/ Undecided (Note: Calculated by taking the difference of 100% and all other candidates combined.)	Margin
270 to Win	February 5–27, 2024	February 28, 2024	15.6%	78.3%	6.1%	Trump +62.7
Decision Desk HQ/The Hill	through February 27, 2024	February 28, 2024	17.2%	78.7%	4.1%	Trump +61.5
FiveThirtyEight	through February 27, 2024	February 28, 2024	15.5%	76.9%	7.6%	Trump +61.4
Race to the WH	through February 23, 2024	February 28, 2024	16.1%	76.7%	7.2%	Trump +60.6
Real Clear Polling	February 13–27, 2024	February 28, 2024	14.5%	78.7%	6.8%	Trump +64.2
Average			15.8%	77.9%	6.3%	Trump +62.1

View source data.

=== Individual polls ===
Poll source	Date(s) administered	Sample size (Note: Key: A – all adults RV – registered voters LV – likely voters V – unclear)	Doug Burgum	Chris Christie	Ron DeSantis	Larry Elder	Nikki Haley	Asa Hutchinson	Mike Pence	Vivek Ramaswamy	Tim Scott	Donald Trump	Other/ Undecided
NPR/PBS/Marist College	May 21–23, 2024	464 (RV)	–	–	–	–	14%	–	–	–	–	85%	1%
YouGov Blue	March 29 – April 5, 2024	1,498 (RV)	–	–	13%	–	11%	–	–	–	–	72%	5%
	March 12, 2024	Georgia, Hawaii, Mississippi, and Washington primaries held. Donald Trump secures a majority of pledged delegates and becomes the presumptive Republican nominee.											
	March 8, 2024	American Samoa caucus held.											
	March 6, 2024	Nikki Haley suspends her campaign, leaving Donald Trump the presumptive Republican nominee.											
Emerson College	March 5–6, 2024	578 (LV)	–	–	–	–	14.5%	–	–	–	–	80.5%	5.0%
	March 5, 2024	Super Tuesday held.											
YouGov/The Economist	March 3–5, 2024	596 (RV)	–	–	–	–	15%	–	–	–	–	76%	9% (Note: Someone Else at 4%; Not Sure at 4%; Would Not Vote at 1%)
	March 4, 2024	The U.S. Supreme Court rules that efforts by Colorado and Maine to remove Donald Trump from the ballot per the Fourteenth Amendment are unconstitutional. North Dakota caucus held.											
	March 1–3, 2024	District of Columbia primary held.											
	March 2, 2024	Idaho, Michigan, and Missouri caucuses held.											
TIPP/Issues & Insights	February 28 – March 1, 2024	500 (RV)	–	–	–	–	11%	–	–	–	–	79%	10%
New York Times/Siena College	February 25–28, 2024	292 (LV)	–	–	–	–	21%	–	–	–	–	76%	3%
HarrisX/Forbes	February 24–28, 2024	1,114 (RV)	–	–	–	–	12%	–	–	–	–	79%	10% (Note: Binkley at 1%; Someone Else at 3%; Don't Know at 6%)
	February 27, 2024	Michigan primary held.											
YouGov/The Economist	February 25–27, 2024	1,684 (A)	–	–	–	–	11%	–	–	–	–	69%	20%
Clarity Campaign Labs	February 22–27, 2024	1,026 (LV)	–	–	–	–	11%	–	–	–	–	83%	6% (Note: Binkley at 1%; Someone Else at 3%; Unsure at 2%)
Leger/The Canadian Press	February 23–25, 2024	300 (A)	–	–	–	–	10%	–	–	–	–	75%	–
	February 24, 2024	South Carolina primary held.											
HarrisX	February 20–23, 2024	1,093 (RV)	–	–	–	–	13%	–	–	–	–	76%	11% (Note: Binkley at 3%; Someone Else at 3%; Don't Know at 5%)
HarrisX/Harris Poll	February 21–22, 2024	784 (RV)	–	–	–	–	14%	–	–	–	–	78%	8%
YouGov/The Economist	February 18–20, 2024	612 (RV)	–	–	–	–	12%	–	–	–	–	78%	10% (Note: Someone Else at 2%; Not Sure at 3%; Would Not Vote at 5%)
Quinnipiac	February 15–19, 2024	576 (LV)	–	–	–	–	17.0%	–	–	–	–	80.0%	2%
ActiVote	February 18, 2024	782 (LV)	–	–	–	–	17.0%	–	–	–	–	83.0%	–
HarrisX	February 12–16, 2024	1,127 (RV)	–	–	–	–	13%	–	–	–	–	77%	10% (Note: Binkley at 1%; Someone Else at 3%; Don't Know at 6%)
Emerson College	February 13–14, 2024	524 (LV)	–	–	–	–	12.9%	–	–	–	–	76.8%	10.3%
Echelon Insights	February 12–14, 2024	437 (LV)	–	–	–	–	18%	–	–	–	–	79%	2%
YouGov/The Economist	February 11–13, 2024	609 (RV)	–	–	–	–	9%	–	–	–	–	80%	11% (Note: Someone Else at 3%; Not Sure at 5%; Would Not Vote at 3%)
	February 8, 2024	Nevada and Virgin Islands caucuses held.											
Cygnal	February 6–8, 2024	1,501 (LV)	–	–	–	–	18.0%	–	–	–	–	76.3%	5.7%
YouGov/The Economist	February 4–6, 2024	611 (RV)	–	–	–	–	12%	–	–	–	–	80%	8% (Note: Someone Else at 1%; Not Sure at 4%; Would Not Vote at 3%)
Morning Consult	February 4–6, 2024	3,752 (LV)	–	–	–	–	18%	–	–	–	–	80%	2%
TIPP/Issues & Insights	January 31 – February 2, 2024	587 (RV)	–	–	–	–	17%	–	–	–	–	74%	8%
McLaughlin & Associates	January 25–31, 2024	456 (LV)	–	–	–	–	19%	–	–	–	–	81%	–
Rasmussen Reports	January 28–30, 2024	679 (LV)	–	–	–	–	23%	–	–	–	–	56%	21% (Note: Other at 11%; Undecided at 10%)
NBC News	January 26–30, 2024	349 (LV)	–	–	1%	–	19%	–	–	1%	–	79%	–
CNN/SSRS	January 25–30, 2024	442 (RV)	–	–	–	–	19%	–	–	–	–	70%	8%
YouGov	January 24–30, 2024	363 (A)	–	–	–	–	13%	–	–	–	–	77%	10% (Note: Someone Else at 3%; Not Sure at 7%)
Emerson College	January 26–29, 2024	571 (LV)	–	–	–	–	18.9%	–	–	–	–	73.1%	8.0%
YouGov/Yahoo News	January 25–29, 2024	451 (RV)	–	–	–	–	14%	–	–	–	–	79%	7% (Note: Unsure at 7%)
Quinnipiac University	January 25–29, 2024	696 (RV)	–	–	–	–	21%	–	–	–	–	77%	–
Leger/The Canadian Press	January 26–28, 2024	299 (RV)	–	–	–	–	13%	–	–	–	–	73%	14% (Note: Someone Else at 7%; I Don't Know at 7%)
Morning Consult	January 24, 2024	1,297 (LV)	–	–	–	–	18%	–	–	–	–	81%	1%
Ipsos/Reuters	January 22–24, 2024	554 (A)	–	–	–	–	19%	–	–	–	–	64%	–
	January 23, 2024	New Hampshire primary held.											
Clarity Campaign Labs	January 19–23, 2024	–	–	–	8%	–	9%	–	–	–	–	78%	4% (Note: Binkley at 0%; Someone Else at 2%; Unsure at 2%)
	January 21, 2024	Ron DeSantis suspends his campaign.											
HarrisX/The Messenger	January 17–21, 2024	–	–	–	9%	–	11%	–	–	–	–	74%	6% (Note: Binkley at 0%; Someone Else at 1%; Don't Know at 5%)
Redfield & Wilton Strategies	January 18, 2024	535 (LV)	–	–	9%	–	9%	0%	–	–	–	72%	10% (Note: Other at 5%; Don't know at 5%)
HarrisX/Harris Poll	January 17–18, 2024	916 (RV)	–	–	10%	–	9%	–	–	–	–	71%	9%
Echelon Insights	January 16–18, 2024	832 (LV)	–	–	13%	–	13%	–	–	–	–	68%	7% (Note: Binkley at 0%; Someone Else at 1%; Unsure at 6%)
Morning Consult	January 17, 2024	1,119 (LV)	–	–	12%	–	14%	–	–	–	–	73%	1%
HarrisX/The Messenger	January 16–17, 2024	373 (RV)	–	–	7%	–	13%	–	–	–	–	72%	8% (Note: Binkley at 0%; Someone Else at 2%; Don't Know at 6%)
	January 16, 2024	Asa Hutchinson suspends his campaign.											
YouGov/The Economist	January 14–16, 2024	588 (RV)	–	–	10%	–	9%	1%	–	4%	–	68%	8% (Note: Someone Else at 0%; Not Sure at 7%; Would Not Vote at 1%)
	January 15, 2024	Iowa caucus held. Vivek Ramaswamy suspends his campaign.											
CBS News	January 10–12, 2024	721 (LV)	–	–	14%	–	12%	1%	–	4%	–	69%	–
	January 10, 2024	Chris Christie suspends his campaign. Fifth debate held.											
Economist/YouGov	January 7–9, 2024	533 (LV)	–	1%	10%	–	12%	0%	–	5%	–	65%	7% (Note: Someone Else at 0%; Not Sure at 6%; Would Not Vote at 1%)
Ipsos/Reuters	January 3–9, 2024	1,941 (A)	–	2%	11%	–	12%	–	–	4%	–	49%	22% (Note: Others/Don't Know at 22%)
Morning Consult	January 5–7, 2024	3,982 (LV)	–	4%	13%	–	11%	1%	–	5%	–	65%	–
Issues & Insights/TIPP	January 3–5, 2024	497 (LV)	–	–	10%	–	10%	–	–	5%	–	65%	8% (Note: Someone Else at 3%; Not Sure at 7%)
Noble Predictive Insights	January 2–4, 2024	1,068 (LV)	–	2%	12%	–	13%	1%	–	7%	–	61%	5% (Note: Binkley at 0%; Someone Else at 2%; None of These at 3%)
YouGov/The Economist	December 31, 2023 – January 2, 2024	529 (RV)	–	1%	14%	–	8%	0%	–	5%	–	63%	8% (Note: Someone Else at 0%; Not Sure at 6%; Would Not Vote at 2%)
USA Today/Suffolk	December 26–29, 2023	325 (RV)	–	4%	10%	–	13%	–	–	6%	–	62%	5%
	December 28, 2023	After a ruling by the Secretary of State Shenna Bellows, Maine disqualifies Donald Trump from its primary ballot under Section 3 of the 14th Amendment. Trump remains on the ballot pending a U.S. Supreme Court ruling in Trump v. Anderson.											
Rasmussen	December 19–21, 2023	792 (LV)	–	9%	9%	–	13%	–	–	1%	–	51%	16%
	December 19, 2023	After a ruling by the Colorado Supreme Court, Colorado disqualifies Donald Trump from its primary ballot under Section 3 of the 14th Amendment. Trump remains on the ballot pending a U.S. Supreme Court ruling in Trump v. Anderson.											
McLaughlin & Associates	December 13–19, 2023	454 (LV)	–	4%	11%	–	10%	2%	–	4%	–	62%	8% (Note: Undecided at 8%)
YouGov/The Economist	December 16–18, 2023	544 (RV)	–	3%	17%	–	10%	0%	–	4%	–	60%	8% (Note: Someone Else at 1%; Not Sure at 6%; Would Not Vote at 1%)
Quinnipiac University	December 14–18, 2023	702 (RV)	–	3%	11%	–	11%	0%	–	4%	–	67%	3% (Note: Someone Else at 0%; Would Note Vote at 1%; Undecided at 2%)
YouGov/Yahoo News	December 14–18, 2023	446 (RV)	–	1%	15%	–	10%	1%	–	3%	–	56%	14% (Note: Not Sure at 13%; Would Not Vote at 1%)
Echelon Insights	December 12–16, 2023	443 (LV)	–	1%	9%	–	10%	0%	–	5%	–	70%	5% (Note: Someone Else at 0%; Unsure at 5%)
CBS News	December 8–15, 2023	378 (LV)	–	3%	22%	–	13%	0%	–	4%	–	58%	–
HarrisX/Harris Poll	December 13–14, 2023	–	–	3%	11%	–	10%	–	–	3%	–	67%	6% (Note: Someone Else at 1%; Don't Know at 5%)
Fox News/Beacon Research	December 10–13, 2023	402 (LV)	–	2%	12%	–	9%	1%	–	5%	–	69%	–
YouGov/The Economist	December 9–12, 2023	557 (A)	–	3%	11%	–	10%	0%	–	4%	–	61%	11% (Note: Someone Else at 1%; Not Sure at 8%; Would Not Vote at 2%)
Monmouth University/Washington Post	December 5–11, 2023	606 (LV)	–	5%	13%	–	13%	0%	–	3%	–	63%	4%
Reuters/Ipsos	December 5–11, 2023	1,689 (RV)	–	2%	11%	–	11%	–	–	5%	–	61%	10%
	December 6, 2023	Fourth debate held.											
Emerson College	December 4–6, 2023	466 (LV)	–	3.7%	6.7%	–	13.9%	1.9%	–	4.0%	–	63.8%	6.0%
SSRS/CNN	November 29 – December 6, 2023	618 (LV)	1%	6%	15%	–	13%	1%	–	4%	–	58%	4% (Note: "No opinion" with 3%; "Someone else" with 1%)
	December 4, 2023	Doug Burgum suspends his campaign.											
Monmouth University	November 30 – December 4, 2023	540 (RV)	1%	2%	18%	–	12%	0%	–	4%	–	58%	5% (Note: None of These at 0%; Don't Know at 5%)
The Wall Street Journal	November 29 – December 4, 2023	419 (RV)	0%	2%	14%	–	15%	0%	–	4%	–	59%	6%
Morning Consult	December 1–3, 2023	3,526 (LV)	0%	3%	13%	–	10%	0%	–	6%	–	66%	2% (Note: Someone Else at 1%)
Pew Research Center	November 27 – December 3, 2023	1,901 (RV)	–	1%	14%	–	11%	–	–	3%	–	52%	18%
Big Village	November 27 – December 3, 2023	861 (LV)	–	1.8%	11.6%	–	10.2%	0.5%	–	5.8%	0.0%	67.2%	2.6% (Note: Binkley at 0.8%; Someone Else at 1.8%)
Trafalgar Group	November 30 – December 2, 2023	1,044 (RV)	0.4%	6.3%	16.7%	–	16.2%	0.9%	–	4.3%	–	53.5%	1.8%
TIPP/Issues & Insights	November 29 – December 1, 2023	567 (RV)	1%	1%	9%	–	10%	1%	–	7%	–	61%	13% (Note: Someone Else at 5%; Not Sure at 8%)
HarrisX/The Messenger	November 22–28, 2023	1,454 (RV)	1%	1%	9%	–	7%	0%	–	4%	–	68%	9% (Note: Binkley and Stapleton at 0%; Someone Else at 1%; Don't Know at 8%)
NewsNation	November 26–27, 2023	–	0.7%	3.4%	10.8%	–	10.1%	0.2%	–	6.2%	–	60.0%	8.7% (Note: Would Not Vote at 0.5%; Someone Else at 2.0%; Not Sure at 6.2%)
HarrisX/Blockchain Association	November 24–26, 2023	666 (RV)	1%	3%	11%	–	7%	1%	–	5%	–	62%	15% (Note: "Dont' know" with 8%; Ryan Binkley & "Someone else" with 1%)
Leger/The Canadian Press	November 24–26, 2023	285 (RV)	–	2%	12%	–	8%	1%	–	6%	–	56%	15% (Note: Cheney at 3%; Someone Else at 1%; Don't Know at 11%)
Morning Consult	November 24–26, 2023	3,944 (LV)	1%	3%	14%	–	10%	1%	–	6%	–	64%	1% (Note: Someone Else at 1%)
Emerson College	November 17–20, 2023	662 (LV)	1.1%	2.7%	7.9%	–	8.5%	1.3%	–	5.2%	–	63.6%	9.7% (Note: Undecided at 9.7%)
McLaughlin & Associates	November 16–20, 2023	453 (LV)	1%	4%	11%	–	8%	1%	–	8%	–	58%	9% (Note: Undecided at 9%)
Morning Consult	November 15–19, 2023	3,619 (LV)	1%	3%	13%	–	9%	1%	–	7%	–	66%	0%
HarrisX/The Messenger	November 15–19, 2023	1,100 (RV)	1%	2%	11%	–	10%	0%	–	4%	–	62%	9% (Note: Binkley and Stapleton at 0%; Someone Else at 2%; Don't Know at 7%)
Echelon Insights	November 14–17, 2023	461 (LV)	0%	1%	12%	–	12%	1%	–	8%	–	61%	5%
Harvard-Harris	November 15–16, 2023	2,851 (RV)	0%	2%	11%	1%	7%	0%	4%	6%	2%	60%	7% (Note: Binkley, Hurd, and Perry Johnson at 0%; Someone Else at 1%; Don't Know at 6%)
YouGov/The Economist	November 11–14, 2023	546 (RV)	0%	0%	19%	–	9%	0%	–	4%	3%	57%	8% (Note: someone else at 1%; not sure at 6%; would not vote at 1%)
NBC News	November 10–14, 2023	317 (RV)	1%	3%	18%	–	13%	1%	–	3%	1%	58%	3% (Note: Other at 0%; None at 2%; Would Not Vote at 1%)
Beacon/Shaw/Fox News	November 10–13, 2023	453 (LV)	–	3%	14%	–	11%	–	–	7%	–	62%	1%
YouGov/Yahoo News	November 9–13, 2023	454 (RV)	0%	2%	15%	–	10%	0%	–	5%	2%	54%	13% (Note: Not Sure at 11%; Would Not Vote at 2%)
Quinnipiac University	November 9–13, 2023	686 (RV)	1%	2%	16%	–	9%	–	–	4%	–	64%	3% (Note: "Undecided" with 2%; "Someone else" with 1%)
	November 12, 2023	Tim Scott suspends his campaign.											
Morning Consult	November 10–12, 2023	3,681 (LV)	1%	2%	14%	–	9%	1%	–	6%	–	64%	1% (Note: Someone Else at 1%)
Lord Ashcroft Polls	November 1–11, 2023	3,245 (LV)	0%	1%	11%	–	6%	0%	–	7%	–	67%	7% (Note: Binkley at 0%)
Cyngal/RMSP/ Women2Women	November 9–10, 2023	801 (LV)	1%	5%	9%	–	8%	1%	–	8%	1%	60%	7%
	November 8, 2023	Third debate held.											
Marquette University Law School	November 2–7, 2023	398 (RV)	0%	1%	12%	–	12%	–	–	4%	2%	54%	16% (Note: Undecided at 16%)
Marquette University Law School	November 2–7, 2023	356 (LV)	1%	0%	12%	–	14%	–	–	4%	2%	57%	11% (Note: Undecided at 11%)
Morning Consult	November 3–5, 2023	3,873 (LV)	0%	3%	15%	–	8%	0%	–	7%	2%	63%	1% (Note: Someone else at 1%)
Trafalgar	November 3–5, 2023	1,089 (LV)	2.9%	5.3%	13.2%	–	15.0%	0.4%	–	4.0%	3.7%	50.1%	5.4% (Note: Undecided at 5.4%)
Big Village	October 30 – November 5, 2023	669 (RV)	–	2.1%	11.5%	–	9.5%	1.2%	–	6.3%	2.3%	64.2%	3.3% (Note: Binkley at 0.7%; Someone Else at 2.6%)
YouGov/CBS News	October 31 – November 3, 2023	556 (LV)	1%	2%	18%	–	9%	0%	–	5%	4%	61%	–
SSRS/CNN	October 27 – November 2, 2023	608 (RV)	–	2%	17%	–	10%	1%	–	4%	3%	61%	3% (Note: "Someone else with 2%; "No opinion with 1%)
Rasmussen	October 26 – November 2, 2023	1,344 (LV)	0%	5%	12%	–	9%	1%	3%	3%	2%	50%	–
HarrisX/The Messenger	October 30 – November 1, 2023	753 (RV)	1%	1%	12%	–	7%	1%	–	6%	1%	62%	8% (Note: Someone Else at 1%; Binkley and Stapleton at 0%; Undecided at 7%)
YouGov/The Economist	October 28–31, 2023	518 (RV)	0% (Note: No voters)	1%	17%	–	8%	1%	–	5%	1%	56%	12% (Note: Someone Else and Would Not Vote with 1%; Undecided with 10%)
American Pulse Research & Polling	October 27–30, 2023	257 (LV)	0.3%	1.7%	12.1%	–	9.8%	–	–	3.6%	1.2%	61.0%	10.5% (Note: Another Candidate at 6.2%; Not Sure at 4.3%)
Quinnipiac	October 26–30, 2023	666 (RV)	1%	3%	15%	–	8%	0%	–	3%	3%	64%	5% (Note: Someone Else with 1%; Would Not Vote and Refused with 0%; Undecided with 4%)
Leger/The Canadian Press	October 27–29, 2023	345 (A)	–	1%	15%	–	5%	0%	3%	2%	1%	62%	11% (Note: Cheney at 2%; Someone Else at 1%; Undecided at 8%)
Morning Consult	October 27–29, 2023	3,912 (LV)	1%	3%	13%	–	7%	0%	5%	7%	2%	61%	2% (Note: Someone Else at 2%)
	October 28, 2023	Mike Pence suspends his campaign.											
	October 26, 2023	Larry Elder suspends his campaign and endorses Donald Trump.											
Echelon Insights	October 23–26, 2023	430 (LV)	0%	0%	12%	0%	7%	0%	3%	6%	1%	62%	8% (Note: Someone Else with 0%; Undecided with 8%)
McLaughlin and Associates	October 22–26, 2023	449 (LV)	1%	3%	8%	1%	8%	1%	6%	7%	2%	55%	11% (Note: Perry Johnson at 1%; Undecided at 10%)
Noble Predictive Insights/The Center Square	October 20–26, 2023	925 (LV)	0%	2%	13%	0%	9%	0%	5%	7%	2%	59%	2% (Note: Someone Else and None of These Candidates at 1%; Binkley and Perry Johnson at 0%)
HarrisX/The Messenger	October 16–23, 2023	1,068 (RV)	1%	2%	11%	0%	6%	1%	4%	5%	1%	61%	8% (Note: Binkley, Perry Johnson, and Stapleton at 0%; Someone Else at 1%; Don't Know at 7%)
Morning Consult	October 20–22, 2023	3,876 (LV)	0%	2%	13%	–	7%	1%	5%	6%	2%	62%	1% (Note: Someone Else at 1%)
	October 20, 2023	Perry Johnson suspends his campaign and endorses Donald Trump.											
USA Today/Suffolk	October 17–20, 2023	309 (RV)	0.7%	1.3%	12.3%	0.7%	11.0%	0.3%	1.3%	2.6%	2.6%	57.9%	9.4% (Note: Binkley and Perry Johnson at 0.0%; Undecided at 8.4%; Refused at 1.0%)
Harvard/HarrisX	October 18–19, 2023	768 (RV)	0%	2%	11%	1%	7%	0%	4%	6%	2%	60%	7% (Note: Binkley, Hurd and Perry Johnson at 0%; Someone Else at 1%; Unsure at 6%)
Emerson College	October 16–17, 2023	728 (RV)	0.9%	3.6%	7.9%	1.0%	8.1%	0.6%	3.2%	3.2%	1.4%	59.2%	10.9% (Note: Perry Johnson at 1.2%; Undecided at 9.7%)
Yahoo News	October 12–16, 2023	486 (LV)	1%	3%	16%	0%	9%	0%	2%	2%	1%	56%	10% (Note: Not Sure at 9%; Would Not Vote at 1%)
Premise	October 11–16, 2023	661 (A)	–	1%	16%	–	6%	–	7%	4%	1%	60%	4% (Note: Cheney at 2%; Pompeo at 0%; Other at 2%)
Zogby Analytics	October 13–15, 2023	304 (LV)	–	3.1%	9.1%	–	6.0%	–	2.6%	6.0%	2.3%	61.9%	8.9% (Note: Someone Else at 1.1%; Not Sure at 7.8%)
Morning Consult	October 13–15, 2023	3,600 (LV)	1%	3%	14%	–	7%	1%	6%	7%	2%	59%	1% (Note: Someone Else at 1%)
	October 13, 2023	Corey Stapleton suspends his campaign.											
Morning Consult	October 10–12, 2023	2,476 (LV)	0%	3%	12%	–	6%	0%	5%	8%	2%	63%	–
Causeway Solutions	October 9–11, 2023	342 (RV)	1%	4%	19%	–	8%	–	8%	6%	0%	47%	7% (Note: Someone Else at 6%; Undecided at 1%)
	October 9, 2023	Will Hurd suspends his campaign and endorses Nikki Haley.											
Fox News	October 6–9, 2023	449 (LV)	–	3%	13%	–	10%	–	4%	7%	1%	59%	2%
CNN/SSRS	October 6–9, 2023	428 (LV)	1%	2%	17%	0%	8%	0%	5%	4%	2%	58%	2% (Note: Hurd and Perry Johnson at 0%; Someone Else at 1%; No Opinion at 1%)
Morning Consult	October 6–8, 2023	2,476 (LV)	1%	3%	12%	–	6%	0%	5%	9%	2%	61%	1% (Note: Hurd at 0%; Other at 1%)
HarrisX/The Messenger	October 4–7, 2023	1,054 (RV)	1%	2%	14%	0%	6%	0%	3%	7%	2%	58%	5% (Note: Perry Johnson, Binkley, Hurd and Stapleton at 0%; Someone Else at 0%; Don't Know at 5%)
Cygnal	October 3–5, 2023	–	0.7%	3.9%	8.7%	0.0%	4.6%	0.6%	4.7%	9.7%	1.7%	57.8%	7.6% (Note: Perry Johnson at 0.7%; Binkley at 0.0%; Undecided at 6.9%)
Survey USA	September 30 – October 3, 2023	1,055 (LV)	1%	3%	9%	–	5%	–	4%	8%	2%	65%	3% (Note: Someone Else at 0%; Undecided at 3%)
YouGov/The Economist	September 30 – October 3, 2023	570 (RV)	1%	1%	13%	0%	7%	0%	3%	4%	2%	58%	11% (Note: Hurd at 0%; Someone Else at 1%; Not Sure at 7%; Would Not Vote at 3%)
Big Village	September 29 – October 3, 2023	988 (RV)	0.3%	2.0%	12.9%	0.2%	6.4%	0.7%	7.0%	6.9%	2.5%	58.4%	2.5% (Note: Binkley at 0.4%; Perry Johnson at 0.2%; Someone Else at 1.9%)
Premise	September 28 – October 2, 2023	500 (A)	–	1%	14%	–	5%	–	6%	5%	3%	60%	6% (Note: Cheney at 3%; Pompeo at 1%; Other at 2%)
Morning Consult	September 29 – October 1, 2023	3,587 (LV)	1%	3%	13%	–	7%	0%	5%	7%	1%	61%	1% (Note: Hurd at 0%; Someone Else at 1%)
Insider Advantage	September 29–30, 2023	850 (LV)	1%	5%	15%	0%	14%	1%	1%	3%	2%	50%	8% (Note: "No opinion" at 8%; Binkley, Hurd and Perry Johnson at 0%)
WPA Intelligence/FairVote	September 28–30, 2023	801 (LV)	0.4%	8.5%	12.7%	0.3%	7.7%	1.1%	4.4%	12.6%	2.8%	47.6%	1.9% (Note: Hurd at 1%; Youngkin at 0.8%; Suarez at 0.1%)
HarrisX/The Messenger	September 28–29, 2023	770 (RV)	1%	1%	11%	1%	7%	0%	5%	8%	1%	56%	6% (Note: Don't know/Unsure at 5%; Someone else at 1%; Binkley, Hurd, Perry and Stapleton at 0%)
TIPP/Issues & Insights	September 27–29, 2023	584 (RV)	1%	2%	13%	1%	4%	0%	4%	6%	1%	56%	11% (Note: Someone Else at 1%; Not Sure at 10%; Hurd at 0%)
Léger/New York Post	September 27–28, 2023	495 (LV)	1%	0%	10%	–	6%	–	3%	7%	3%	62%	9% (Note: Cheney at 1%; Someone Else at 2%; Don't know at 6%)
Echelon Insights	September 25–28, 2023	402 (LV)	0%	1%	11%	0%	5%	0%	5%	10%	1%	62%	4% (Note: Hurd at 0%; Someone Else at 1%; Unsure at 3%)
	September 27, 2023	Second debate held.											
YouGov/The Economist	September 23–26, 2023	559 (A)	0%	2%	12%	0%	7%	0%	5%	5%	3%	51%	15% (Note: Hurd at 0%; Someone Else at 1%; Not Sure at 10%; Would Not Vote at 4%)
McLaughlin & Associates	September 22–26, 2023	454 (LV)	1%	2%	12%	0%	6%	1%	5%	10%	2%	54%	8% (Note: Undecided at 6%; Hurd and Perry Johnson at 1%)
Marquette University Law School	September 18–25, 2023	418 (A)	0%	0%	11%	0%	6%	0%	4%	4%	1%	56%	16% (Note: Hurd at 0%; Undecided at 16%)
Morning Consult	September 22–24, 2023	3,552 (LV)	1%	2%	15%	–	7%	1%	6%	9%	2%	58%	1% (Note: Hurd at 0%; Someone Else at 1%)
Monmouth University	September 19–24, 2023	514 (RV)	0%	1%	15%	–	6%	0%	1%	4%	3%	48%	23% (Note: Other at 3%; Don't Know at 20%)
Trafalgar Group	September 18–21, 2023	1,091 (LV)	3.2%	3.2%	14.3%	1.3%	4.2%	0.4%	3.8%	5.9%	3.0%	56.1%	4.5% (Note: Perry Johnson at 1.1 %; Binkley at 0.2%; Hurd at 0.1%; Undecided at 3.1%)
ABC News/Washington Post	September 15–20, 2023	474 (A)	0%	3%	15%	–	7%	0%	6%	3%	4%	54%	10% (Note: Other at 4%; No Opinion at 6%)
NBC News	September 15–19, 2023	321 (RV)	0%	4%	16%	–	7%	1%	4%	2%	3%	59%	4% (Note: Other at 1%; None at 2%; Would Not Vote at 1%)
HarrisX/The Messenger	September 13–19, 2023	1,089 (RV)	1%	2%	14%	1%	5%	1%	3%	5%	2%	56%	11% (Note: Binkley, Hurd and Stapleton at 1%; Perry Johnson at 0%; Suarez at 0%; Someone Else at 1%; Don't Know at 7%)
Emerson College	September 17–18, 2023	518 (LV)	1.1%	4.8%	11.5%	–	3.0%	0.5%	4.6%	6.8%	2.2%	58.9%	6.6% (Note: Hurd at 1.3%; Perry Johnson at 0.1%; Undecided at 5.2%)
YouGov	September 14–18, 2023	470 (RV)	1%	1%	13%	0%	5%	0%	3%	5%	1%	59%	11% (Note: Not Sure at 9%; Would Not Vote at 2%)
YouGov/The Liberal Patriot	September 7–18, 2023	1,653 (LV)	1%	6%	14%	1%	8%	1%	5%	5%	4%	48%	7% (Note: Other at 7%)
Morning Consult	September 15–17, 2023	3,404 (LV)	0%	2%	13%	–	6%	1%	5%	10%	2%	59%	1% (Note: Hurd at 0%; Someone Else at 1%)
Harvard/Harris (Note: Poll sponsored by Harvard University Center for American Political Studies)	September 13–14, 2023	758 (RV)	0%	2%	10%	1%	6%	0%	4%	8%	2%	57%	11% (Note: Perry Johnson at 1%; Binkley and Hurd at 0%; Someone Else at 1%; Don't Know at 9%)
Ipsos/Reuters	September 8–14, 2023	1,749 (A)	0%	2%	14%	–	4%	0%	4%	13%	2%	51%	10% (Note: Cheney and Youngkin at 1%; Hurd at 0%; Don't Know at 7%; None at 1%; Other at 0%)
YouGov/The Economist	September 10–12, 2023	572 (A)	0%	2%	14%	0%	5%	0%	5%	6%	3%	52%	12% (Note: Hurd at 0%; Someone Else 1%; Not Sure at 6%; Would Not Vote 5%)
Fox News	September 9–12, 2023	409 (LV)	–	2%	13%	–	5%	–	3%	11%	3%	60%	2%
Quinnipiac University	September 7–11, 2023	728 (RV)	–	2%	12%	–	5%	–	5%	6%	3%	62%	4% (Note: Undecided at 3%, Refused at 1%)
HarrisX/The Messenger	September 6–11, 2023	954 (RV)	0%	2%	11%	1%	4%	0%	4%	7%	2%	59%	10% (Note: Hurd and Perry Johnson at 1% Binkley at 0%; Stapleton at 0%; Suarez at 0%; Someone Else at 1%; Unsure at 7%)
Morning Consult	September 8–10, 2023	3,715 (LV)	0%	3%	14%	–	6%	0%	6%	9%	2%	57%	1% (Note: Hurd at 0%; Someone Else at 1%)
Premise	August 30 – September 5, 2023	415 (RV)	–	1%	12%	–	5%	–	7%	5%	2%	62%	7% (Note: Cheney at 3%; Cruz at 2%; Pompeo at 1%; Other at 1%)
Rasmussen	August 29 – September 5, 2023	1,418 (LV)	0%	9%	9%	1%	7%	0%	4%	5%	4%	45%	0% (Note: Binkley, Hurd and Perry Johnson at 0%; Suarez at 0%)
Redfield & Wilton Strategies	September 3–4, 2023	605 (LV)	0%	3%	9%	–	2%	1%	3%	10%	1%	65%	6% (Note: Perry Johnson at 0%; Suarez at 0%; Someone Else at 1%)
Morning Consult	September 2–4, 2023	3,745 (LV)	0%	3%	15%	–	5%	1%	6%	8%	2%	60%	1% (Note: Hurd at 0%; Someone Else at 1%)
Issues & Insights/TIPP	August 30 – September 1, 2023	509 (RV)	0.4%	1%	11%	0.87%	2.8%	0.4%	6%	9%	1.3%	60%	15% (Note: Hurd at 0%; Someone Else at 7%)
Echelon Insights	August 28–31, 2023	397 (LV)	0%	3%	15%	1%	4%	1%	6%	12%	1%	52%	6% (Note: Hurd and Suarez at 0%; Someone Else at 1%; Unsure at 5%)
SSRS/CNN	August 25–31, 2023	784 (RV)	1%	2%	18%	1%	7%	0%	7%	6%	3%	52%	2% (Note: Hurd, Perry Johnson and Suarez at 0%; Someone Else at 1%; No Opinion at 1%)
Wall Street Journal	August 24–30, 2023	600 (LV)	1%	3%	13%	0%	8%	1%	2%	5%	2%	59%	4% (Note: Hurd, Perry Johnson and Suarez at 0%; Undecided at 4%)
	August 29, 2023	Francis Suarez suspends his campaign.											
Morning Consult	August 29, 2023	3,617 (LV)	0%	3%	14%	–	5%	1%	6%	10%	2%	58%	1% (Note: Hurd and Suarez at 0%; Someone Else at 1%)
YouGov/The Economist	August 26–29, 2023	562 (A)	0%	2%	14%	0%	4%	0%	3%	5%	2%	51%	18% (Note: Hurd and Suarez at 0%; Someone Else at 1%; Not Sure at 11%; Would Not Vote at 6%)
FairVote/WPA Intelligence	August 24–28, 2023	800 (LV)	0.7%	4.8%	18.5%	0.0%	8.5%	0.5%	5.7%	6.9%	3.6%	49.3%	1.4% (Note: Hurd at 0.7%; Youngkin at 0.4%; Suarez at 0.3%)
HarrisX/The Messenger	August 24–28, 2023	685 (RV)	0%	2%	14%	0%	3%	0%	6%	8%	2%	59%	6% (Note: Binkley, Hurd and Perry Johnson at 0%; Suarez at 0%; Someone Else and Stapleton at 0%; Undecided at 6%)
Big Village	August 25–27, 2023	722 (A)	0.6%	1.7%	14.0%	0.4%	5.1%	0.9%	6.4%	8.8%	1.9%	56.8%	3.2% (Note: Perry Johnson at 1.2%; Binkley at 0.5%; Someone Else at 1.5%)
Emerson College	August 25–26, 2023	460 (LV)	0.6%	5.2%	11.6%	–	6.5%	0.6%	6.9%	8.8%	1.6%	49.6%	8.6% (Note: Perry Johnson at 0.4%; Hurd and Suarez at 0.3%; Undecided at 7.6%)
Ipsos/Reuters	August 24–25, 2023	347 (A)	0%	1%	13%	–	4%	0%	6%	5%	1%	52%	17% (Note: Hurd at 1%; Suarez at 0%; Don't Know at 16%)
Kaplan Strategies	August 24, 2023	844 (LV)	2%	4%	10%	–	8%	1%	5%	13%	4%	45%	8% (Note: Uncertain at 8%)
Morning Consult	August 24, 2023	1,256 (LV)	0%	4%	14%	–	3%	0%	6%	11%	3%	58%	1% (Note: Hurd and Suarez at 0%; Someone Else at 1%)
Patriot Polling	August 24, 2023	750 (RV)	4.3%	6.2%	21.0%	–	12.6%	1.0%	5.4%	5.1%	3.5%	40.6%	3.8% (Note: Unsure at 3.8%)
InsiderAdvantage	August 24, 2023	850 (LV)	1.1%	4.2%	17.8%	1.3%	10.8%	0.9%	2.2%	6.5%	3.3%	44.9%	7.0% (Note: Hurd at 0.9%; Binkley and Suarez at 0.2%; Perry Johnson at 0%; No Opinion at 5.7%)
Léger/New York Post	August 23–24, 2023	658 (RV)	–	1%	9%	–	2%	–	5%	5%	3%	61%	11% (Note: Cheney and Hurd at 0%; Don't Know at 9%; Someone Else at 2%)
	August 23, 2023	First debate held.											
McLaughlin & Associates	August 15–23, 2023	450 (LV)	1%	4%	9%	1%	3%	1%	4%	13%	4%	51%	11% (Note: Hurd, Perry Johnson and Suarez at 0%; Undecided at 11%)
Big Data Poll	August 19–21, 2023	1,307 (LV)	0%	2%	12%	1%	3%	0%	5%	11%	2%	56%	6% (Note: Undecided with 5%; "Someone else" with 1%; Ryan Binkley, Will Hurd, Perry Johnson & Francis Suarez with 0%)
Rasmussen	August 19–21, 2023	818 (LV)	0%	7%	10%	1%	3%	1%	3%	11%	4%	49%	0% (Note: Binkley, Hurd, Perry Johnson and Suarez at 0%)
Yahoo News/YouGov	August 17–21, 2023	482 (RV)	1%	2%	12%	0%	3%	0%	2%	8%	4%	52%	16% (Note: Suarez at 0%; Not Sure at 14%; Would Not Vote at 2%)
Premise	August 17–21, 2023	463 (A)	–	1%	15%	–	2%	–	4%	5%	3%	63%	8% (Note: Cheney and Cruz at 2%; Pompeo at 1%; Other at 3%)
HarrisX	August 17–21, 2023	1,057 (LV)	0%	3%	12%	0%	3%	1%	4%	10%	4%	52%	12% (Note: Binkley at 1%; Hurd, Perry Johnson, Stapleton and Suarez at 0%; Someone Else at 2%; Unsure at 9%)
Insider Advantage	August 19–20, 2023	750 (LV)	1.2%	4.2%	9.7%	1.6%	4.8%	1.5%	3.3%	6.3%	3.3%	50.6%	13.5% (Note: Hurd at 1.1%; Perry Johnson at 0.6%; Binkley at 0.2%; Suarez at 0.1%; No Opinion at 11.5%)
Morning Consult	August 18–20, 2023	3,608 (LV)	0%	3%	14%	–	3%	1%	6%	10%	3%	58%	1% (Note: Hurd and Suarez at 0%; Someone Else at 1%)
YouGov/CBS News	August 16–18, 2023	531 (LV)	1%	2%	16%	0%	2%	1%	5%	7%	3%	62%	0% (Note: Hurd and Suarez at 0%)
Emerson College	August 16–17, 2023	465 (LV)	1.1%	2.8%	10.1%	0.8%	1.9%	0.8%	3.4%	9.5%	2.4%	55.5%	11.8% (Note: Hurd at 0.7%; Perry Johnson at 0.3%; Undecided at 10.8%)
Echelon Insights (Note: Poll commissioned by the Republican Main Street Partnership)	August 15–17, 2023	1,017 (LV)	–	1%	12%	–	3%	–	4%	15%	3%	55%	–
3D Strategic Research	August 15–17, 2023	858 (LV)	0%	5%	16%	0%	4%	0%	6%	9%	3%	50%	6% (Note: Binkley, Hurd, Perry Johnson and Suarez at 0%; Undecided at 6%)
Victory Insights	August 15–17, 2023	825 (LV)	–	5.9%	12.1%	–	1.9%	–	3.5%	3.7%	1.2%	60.8%	11.0% (Note: Perry Johnson at 1.1%; Someone Else at 2.3%; Undecided at 7.6%)
JMC Analytics	August 14–17, 2023	1,100 (LV)	0.9%	4.5%	13.0%	–	3.4%	1.2%	3.5%	5.0%	4.1%	52.0%	12.8% (Note: Hurd at 0.4%; Suarez at 0.3%; Perry Johnson at 0.1%; Undecided at 12%)
Kaplan Strategies	August 15–16, 2023	1,093 (LV)	1%	3%	10%	–	5%	3%	6%	11%	3%	47%	11% (Note: Suarez at 2%; Undecided at 9%)
American Pulse	August 15–16, 2023	821 (LV)	–	4.0%	13.0%	–	3.0%	–	4.0%	7.1%	3.5%	58.0%	–
Trafalgar Group	August 14–16, 2023	1,082 (LV)	0.1%	4.6%	17.0%	1.2%	4.2%	0.9%	4.6%	4.3%	4.0%	55.4%	2.6% (Note: Perry Johnson at 1.1%; Hurd at 0.3%; Binkley at 0.2%; Suarez at 0.1%; Undecided at 2.0%)
The Economist/YouGov	August 12–15, 2023	527 (RV)	0%	2%	15%	0%	2%	0%	3%	4%	3%	53%	16% (Note: Hurd and Suarez at 0%; Someone Else 1%; Not Sure at 11%; Would Not Vote 4%)
	August 14, 2023	Donald Trump is indicted for racketeering to overturn the 2020 U.S. presidential election in Georgia											
Fox News/Beacon Research	August 12–14, 2023	413 (RV)	1%	3%	16%	0%	4%	0%	5%	11%	3%	53%	0% (Note: Hurd, Perry Johnson and Suarez at 0%)
Quinnipiac University	August 10–14, 2023	681 (RV)	0%	3%	18%	0%	3%	1%	4%	5%	3%	57%	6% (Note: Hurd at 1%; Cheney, Cruz, Hogan, Perry Johnson, Noem, Pompeo, Suarez, Sununu, and Youngkin at 0%; Someone Else at 0%; Wouldn't Vote at 0%; Undecided at 4%; Refused at 1%)
Morning Consult	August 11–13, 2023	3,064 (LV)	1%	3%	16%	–	3%	1%	7%	9%	3%	57%	2% (Note: Suarez at 1%; Hurd at 0%; Someone Else at 1%)
Kaplan Strategies	August 9–10, 2023	800 (LV)	1%	4%	10%	–	4%	0%	8%	11%	2%	48%	13% (Note: Uncertain at 13%)
Premise	August 2–7, 2023	484 (A)	–	2%	16%	–	3%	–	6%	6%	3%	57%	6% (Note: Cheney and Cruz at 2%; Pompeo at 0%; Other at 2%)
Fairleigh Dickinson University	July 31 – August 7, 2023	806 (LV)	1%	5%	15%	0%	3%	0%	5%	3%	2%	58%	6% (Note: Hurd at 0%; Other at 0%; Don't Know at 6%)
Morning Consult	August 4–6, 2023	3,486 (LV)	0%	3%	16%	–	3%	1%	6%	8%	3%	59%	1% (Note: Hurd and Suarez at 0%; Someone Else at 1%)
Issues & Insights/TIPP	August 2–4, 2023	529 (RV)	0%	0%	12%	0%	4%	0%	5%	8%	2%	57%	10% (Note: Someone Else at 1%; Not Sure at 9%)
Reuters/Ipsos	August 2–3, 2023	355 (A)	0%	0%	13%	–	5%	1%	8%	7%	2%	47%	17% (Note: Youngkin at 1%; Cheney, Hurd and Suarez at 0%; Other at 1%; None at 1%; Don't Know at 14%)
Cygnal	August 1–3, 2023	(LV)	0.2%	2.1%	10.4%	0.2%	2.8%	0.3%	6.6%	11.4%	3.2%	53.3%	9.6% (Note: Suarez at 0.6%; Binkley at 0.2%; Perry Johnson at 0%; Other at 0%; Undecided at 8.8%)
	August 1, 2023	Donald Trump is indicted for attempting to overturn the 2020 U.S. presidential election											
Morning Consult	July 28–30, 2023	3,716 (LV)	1%	3%	15%	–	3%	0%	7%	9%	3%	58%	2% (Note: Hurd at 1%; Suarez at 0%; Someone else at 1%)
Echelon Insights	July 24–27, 2023	399 (LV)	1%	1%	16%	0%	2%	1%	3%	11%	3%	56%	5% (Note: Hurd and Suarez at 0%; Someone Else at 1%; Unsure at 4%)
The New York Times/Siena College	July 23–27, 2023	932 (LV)	0%	2%	17%	0%	3%	0%	3%	2%	3%	54%	14% (Note: Hurd, Perry Johnson and Suarez at 0%; Someone Else at 1%; Don't Know at 13%)
Big Village	July 24–26, 2023	718 (A)	0.5%	0.9%	13.5%	0.4%	3.2%	0.7%	7.5%	7.2%	2.6%	61.0%	2.5% (Note: Perry Johnson at 0.7%; Binkley at 0.1%; Someone Else at 1.7%)
Premise	July 21–26, 2023	442 (A)	–	1%	16%	–	2%	–	7%	4%	3%	59%	9% (Note: Cheney and Cruz at 2%; Pompeo at 1%; Other at 4%)
Economist/YouGov	July 22–25, 2023	537	0%	1%	18%	0%	3%	0%	3%	5%	3%	55%	13% (Note: Hurd and Suarez at 0%; Someone Else at 1%; Not Sure at 9%; Would Not Vote at 3%)
McLaughlin & Associates	July 19–24, 2023	452 (LV)	0%	2%	13%	0%	3%	0%	5%	8%	3%	52%	14% (Note: Cheney at 2%; Hurd, Perry Johnson and Romney at 1%; Perry at 0%; Suarez at 0%; Undecided at 9%)
Morning Consult	July 21–23, 2023	3,576	1%	2%	16%	–	4%	0%	6%	8%	2%	59%	1% (Note: Hurd and Suarez at 0%; Someone else at 1%)
JMC Analytics	July 18–22, 2023	1,100 (LV)	1.0%	4.4%	17.0%	–	3.1%	1.0%	3.2%	2.9%	4.5%	53.0%	10% (Note: Perry Johnson at 0%; Other at 1%; Undecided at 9%)
Harvard-Harris	July 19–20, 2023	729 (RV)	1%	2%	12%	0%	4%	1%	7%	10%	2%	52%	10% (Note: Binkley at 1%; Hurd, Perry Johnson and Suarez at 0%; Someone Else at 1%; Unsure at 8%)
Rasmussen Reports	July 18–20, 2023	1,031 (LV)	–	5%	13%	–	3%	3%	5%	3%	4%	57%	5%
Monmouth University	July 12–19, 2023	681 (RV)	1%	3%	22%	0%	3%	0%	3%	5%	3%	54%	7% (Note: Perry Johnson at 1%; Hurd and Suarez at 0%; None of These at 2%; Don't Know at 4%)
Kaplan Strategies	July 17–18, 2023	800 (LV)	0%	5%	12%	–	3%	1%	4%	12%	5%	48%	10%
Yahoo News	July 13–17, 2023	468	1%	1%	23%	0%	3%	0%	3%	3%	4%	48%	13% (Note: Suarez at 0%; Unsure at 12%; Would Not Vote at 1%)
Quinnipiac University	July 13–17, 2023	727 (RV)	0%	3%	25%	0%	4%	0%	4%	2%	3%	54%	3% (Note: Hurd and Suarez at 0%; Undecided at 3%)
Reuters/Ipsos	July 11–17, 2023	4,414	0%	3%	19%	–	3%	0%	7%	9%	2%	47%	11% (Note: Cheney and Sununu at 1%; Hurd, Youngkin and Suarez at 0%; Other at 1%; None at 1%; Don't Know at 7%)
Morning Consult	July 14–16, 2023	3,630	0%	2%	20%	–	4%	0%	7%	8%	3%	55%	1% (Note: Hurd and Suarez at 0%; Someone else at 1%)
Premise	July 7–14, 2023	355 (RV)	–	2%	19%	–	3%	–	5%	4%	2%	58%	9% (Note: Cheney at 2%; Cruz and Pompeo at 1%; Other at 5%)
YouGov/The Economist	July 8–11, 2023	502 (RV)	0%	2%	22%	0%	3%	0%	5%	2%	3%	48%	13% (Note: Hurd and Suarez at 0%; Someone Else at 2%; Not Sure at 10%; Would Not Vote at 1%)
Morning Consult	July 7–9, 2023	3,616	0%	3%	17%	–	3%	1%	7%	8%	3%	56%	1% (Note: Hurd and Suarez at 0%; Someone else at 1%)
Issues & Insights/TIPP	July 5–7, 2023	486 (RV)	1%	2%	14%	1%	3%	1%	6%	7%	3%	53%	9% (Note: Not sure at 9%)
Echelon Insights	June 26–29, 2023	413 (LV)	1%	2%	16%	0%	5%	0%	5%	10%	4%	49%	7% (Note: Suarez at 1%; Hurd, Perry and Youngkin at 0%; Unsure at 6%)
Fox News	June 23–26, 2023	391	0%	1%	22%	1%	3%	1%	4%	5%	4%	56%	4% (Note: Hurd and Suarez at 0%; Don't Know at 3%, None of the above 1%)
Morning Consult	June 23–25, 2023	3,650	0%	2%	19%	–	3%	1%	7%	6%	3%	57%	1% (Note: Hurd and Suarez at 0%; Someone Else at 1%)
	June 22, 2023	Will Hurd declares his candidacy.											
Emerson College	June 19–20, 2023	365 (RV)	1%	2%	21%	–	4%	1%	6%	2%	2%	59%	2% (Note: Someone Else at 2%)
NBC News	June 16–20, 2023	500 (RV)	0%	5%	22%	–	4%	2%	7%	3%	3%	51%	0% (Note: None at 3%; Other at 0%)
YouGov	June 16–20, 2023	366 (RV)	0%	4%	25%	1%	2%	0%	5%	2%	4%	47%	10% (Note: Suarez at 0%; Not Sure at 9%; Would Not Vote at 1%)
Morning Consult	June 17–19, 2023	3,521 (PV)	0%	3%	20%	–	3%	1%	7%	3%	3%	57%	1% (Note: Someone Else at 1%)
McLaughlin & Associates	June 15–19, 2023	454	1%	2%	19%	0%	4%	0%	5%	2%	5%	52%	9% (Note: Cheney and Suarez at 1%; Perry Johnson and Rick Perry at 0%; Undecided at 7%)
CNN/SSRS	June 13–17, 2023	1,350 (A)	0%	3%	26%	0%	5%	1%	9%	1%	4%	47%	2% (Note: Someone else and no opinion at 1%)
Harvard-Harris	June 14–15, 2023	2,090 (RV)	0%	2%	14%	–	4%	0%	8%	3%	2%	59%	7% (Note: Unsure at 7%)
The Messenger/HarrisX	June 14–15, 2023	283 (RV)	0%	2%	17%	–	3%	1%	6%	2%	4%	53%	11% (Note: Someone Else at 2%; Unsure at 9%)
	June 14, 2023	Francis Suarez declares his candidacy.											
Big Village	June 9–14, 2023	724 (RV)	1.0%	1.4%	15.3%	1.1%	4.5%	0.8%	9.9%	3.2%	3.6%	56.4%	3.0% (Note: Perry Johnson at 0.5%; Binkley at 0.4%; Someone Else at 2.1%)
Economist/YouGov	June 10–13, 2023	411 (RV)	–	2%	21%	–	4%	–	4%	1%	3%	51%	14% (Note: Not Sure at 11%, Would Not Vote at 3%)
Quinnipiac University	June 8–12, 2023	700 (RV)	0%	4%	23%	0%	4%	1%	4%	3%	4%	53%	–
Morning Consult	June 9–11, 2023	3,419	0%	2%	19%	–	3%	1%	8%	3%	4%	59%	1% (Note: Someone else at 1%)
CBS News	June 7–10, 2023	2,480 (A)	1%	1%	23%	1%	3%	1%	4%	1%	4%	61%	–
USA Today/Suffolk	June 5–9, 2023	–	0%	2%	23%	1%	4%	1%	4%	–	6%	48%	–
Reuters/Ipsos	June 5–9, 2023	1,005 (A)	1%	2%	22%	0%	3%	0%	7%	3%	2%	43%	17% (Note: Others/Undecided at 17%)
	June 8, 2023	Donald Trump is indicted in Florida for mishandling of national security documents											
	June 7, 2023	Doug Burgum declares his candidacy.											
	June 6, 2023	Chris Christie declares his candidacy.											
	June 5, 2023	Mike Pence declares his candidacy.											
Morning Consult	June 2–4, 2023	3,545 (LV)	–	1%	22%	–	3%	1%	7%	3%	3%	56%	5% (Note: Cheney at 2%; Abbot, Noem, and someone else at 1%)
Issues & Insights/TIPP	May 31 – June 2, 2023	1,230 (RV)	–	1%	19%	0%	3%	1%	6%	2%	3%	55%	10% (Note: Others/Undecided at 10%)
Premise	May 29 – June 1, 2023	563 (RV)	–	1%	20%	–	3%	–	4%	1%	2%	57%	11% (Note: Liz Cheney at 4%; Ted Cruz at 3%; Mike Pompeo at 1%; Other at 3%)
YouGov	May 25–30, 2023	432 (RV)	–	–	25%	1%	3%	1%	–	3%	3%	53%	11%
Big Village	May 26–28, 2023	389	–	–	24%	–	5%	1%	–	3%	5%	58%	5% (Note: Someone Else at 5%)
Morning Consult	May 26–28, 2023	3,485 (LV)	–	–	22%	–	4%	1%	5%	4%	3%	56%	5% (Note: Cheney at 2%; Abbott, Noem, and Someone Else at 1%)
	May 24, 2023	Ron DeSantis declares his candidacy.											
McLaughlin & Associates	May 17–24, 2023	446 (LV)	0%	1%	16%	0%	3%	1%	7%	4%	2%	54%	13% (Note: Romney at 3%; Cheney and Perry at 1%; Abbott, Bolton, Sununu, and Youngkin at 0%; Undecided at 8%)
FOX News	May 19–22, 2023	412 (RV)	–	0%	20%	0%	4%	0%	5%	4%	2%	53%	12% (Note: Cheney at 2%; Abbott, Noem, Sununu, and Youngkin at 1%; Suarez at 0%; Others/Undecided at 6%)
Quinnipiac	May 18–22, 2023	1,616 (RV)	–	2%	25%	1%	3%	0%	2%	1%	2%	56%	8% (Note: Youngkin, Sununu, Noem, Cheney, at 1%; Perry Johnson at 0%; Undecided at 4%)
Morning Consult	May 19–21, 2023	3,526 (LV)	–	–	20%	–	4%	0%	6%	4%	2%	58%	6% (Note: Cheney at 2%; Abbott and Someone Else at 1%; Noem at 0%; Undecided at 2%)
CNN	May 17–20, 2023	467 (RV)	1%	2%	26%	0%	6%	1%	6%	1%	1%	53%	2% (Note: Chris Sununu at 1%; No opinion at 1%)
	May 19, 2023	Tim Scott declares his candidacy.											
Harvard-Harris	May 17–18, 2023	2,004 (RV)	–	–	16%	–	4%	1%	4%	4%	1%	58%	12% (Note: Cruz at 3%; Rubio at 1%; Other/Undecided at 8%)
Cygnal	May 16–18, 2023	2,527 (LV)	–	–	20.9%	–	4.7%	1.0%	4.3%	4.8%	1.5%	51.5%	11.3% (Note: Other at 0.0%; Undecided at 11.3%)
Marquette University	May 8–18, 2023	1,000 (A)	–	0%	25%	1%	5%	0%	2%	3%	1%	46%	17% (Note: Chris Sununu at 1%; Undecided at 16%)
Rasmussen Reports	May 11–15, 2023	996 (LV)	–	–	17%	–	5%	3%	6%	2%	–	62%	5% (Note: Others/Undecided at 5%)
Reuters/Ipsos	May 9–15, 2023	4,410 (A)	–	–	21%	–	4%	1%	5%	4%	1%	49%	15% (Note: Sununu at 1%; Others/Undecided at 14%)
Morning Consult	May 12–14, 2023	3,571 (LV)	–	–	18%	–	4%	1%	6%	4%	1%	61%	5% (Note: Cheney at 2%; Abbott at 1%; Noem at 0%, Someone Else at 2%)
Morning Consult	May 5–7, 2023	3,574 (RV)	–	–	19%	–	3%	1%	5%	5%	1%	60%	4% (Note: Liz Cheney at 2%; Greg Abbott and Kristi Noem at 1%)
Issues & Insights/TIPP	May 3–5, 2023	469 (RV)	–	–	17%	1%	4%	1%	6%	4%	2%	55%	10% (Note: Others/Undecided at 10%)
ABC News/Washington Post	April 28 – May 3, 2023	438 (LV)	–	–	25%	–	6%	1%	6%	–	4%	53%	5% (Note: Other/Undecided at 5%)
Premise	April 27 – May 1, 2023	752 (RV)	–	1%	21%	–	4%	–	5%	2%	1%	58%	8% (Note: Cruz at 3%, Cheney at 1%, Pompeo at 0%, Other at 3%)
Morning Consult	April 28–30, 2023	3,389 (LV)	–	–	22%	–	4%	–	7%	3%	2%	56%	5% (Note: Cheney and at 2%; Abbott, Noem, and Someone Else at 1%)
CBS News	April 27–29, 2023	2,372 (A)	–	2%	22%	2%	4%	1%	5%	5%	1%	58%	–
Emerson College	April 24–25, 2023	446 (LV)	–	2%	16%	–	3%	2%	7%	3%	–	62%	4% (Note: Someone else at 4%)
FOX News	April 21–24, 2023	408 (RV)	–	–	21%	1%	4%	–	6%	3%	2%	53%	2% (Note: Cheney at 2%)
Reuters/Ipsos	April 21–24, 2023	361 (RV)	–	–	23%	1%	3%	–	6%	2%	–	49%	17% (Note: Sununu at 1%; Others/Undecided at 17%)
	April 23, 2023	Ryan Binkley declares his candidacy.											
Morning Consult	April 21–23, 2023	3,640 (LV)	–	–	21%	–	3%	1%	7%	3%	1%	58%	6% (Note: Cheney at 3%; Abbot, Noem, Youngkin, and someone else at 1%)
	April 20, 2023	Larry Elder declares his candidacy.											
Cygnal	April 18–20, 2023	2,500 (LV)	–	–	25.5%	–	4.6%	1.3%	4.5%	2%	1.5%	46.1%	14.5% (Note: Undecided at 14.5%)
Harvard-Harris	April 18–19, 2023	1,845 (RV)	–	–	20%	–	4%	0%	7%	2%	1%	55%	4% (Note: Cruz and Rubio at 1%, Someone Else at 2%)
NBC News	April 14–18, 2023	1,000 (RV)	–	–	31%	–	3%	3%	6%	2%	3%	46%	2% (Note: Others at 2%)
Wall Street Journal	April 11–17, 2023	600 (LV)	–	–	24%	–	5%	–	1%	2%	3%	48%	17% (Note: Noem, Youngkin, Sununu at 1%, Others/Undecided at 14%)
Morning Consult	April 14–16, 2023	3,499 (LV)	–	–	24%	–	4%	–	7%	3%	2%	53%	5% (Note: Cheney at 2%; Abbot, Noem, and Undecided at 1%)
	April 12, 2023	Tim Scott forms his exploratory committee.											
Morning Consult	April 7–9, 2023	3,608 (LV)	–	–	23%	–	4%	1%	7%	1%	1%	56%	7% (Note: Cheney at 3%; Abbot, Noem, Pompeo, and Undecided at 1%)
Reuters/Ipsos	April 5–6, 2023	1,004 (A)	–	0%	21%	–	1%	1%	4%	1%	–	58%	5% (Note: Cheney at 3%, Pompeo and Youngkin at 1%, Sununu at 0%, Other at 0%)
Reuters	March 22 – April 3, 2023	2,005 (LV)	–	2%	19%	–	6%	–	5%	–	–	48%	5% (Note: Cheney at 3%; Pompeo and Sununu at 1%, Youngkin at 0%, Other at 1%)
	April 2, 2023	Asa Hutchinson declares his candidacy.											
Morning Consult	March 31 – April 2, 2023	3,488 (RV)	–	–	26%	–	4%	–	7%	–	1%	55%	7% (Note: Cheney 2%; Abbot, Pompeo, at 1%, others 1%.)
Trafalgar	March 31 – April 2, 2023	1,123 (RV)	–	–	22.5%	0.4%	3.7%	–	3.8%	0.5%	1%	56.2%	12% (Note: Cheney at 10.3%, Pompeo at 1.1%, Youngkin at 0.5%, Sununu at 0.1%)
InsiderAdvantage	March 31 – April 1, 2023	550 (LV)	–	2%	24%	–	5%	–	4%	1%	0%	57%	3% (Note: Noem, Pompeo, Sununu at 1%, Youngkin at 0%, Someone Else at 0%)
YouGov	March 30–31, 2023	1,089 (A)	–	2%	21%	–	5%	–	3%	1%	–	52%	2% (Note: Pompeo at 2%, Cheney, Hogan, and Youngkin at 0%)
	March 30, 2023	Donald Trump is indicted in New York for falsifying business records											
Echelon Insights	March 27–29, 2023	370 (RV)	–	0%	26%	–	4%	–	8%	1%	1%	49%	2% (Note: Noem at 1%, Hawley, Pompeo, R. Scott, Sununu, Youngkin at 0%, Someone Else at 1%)
Morning Consult	March 24–28, 2023	3,452 (RV)	–	–	26%	–	5%	–	7%	1%	2%	52%	7% (Note: Cheney at 3%; Abbott, Noem, Pompeo, Youngkin at 1%)
Cygnal	March 26–27, 2023	2,550 (RV)	–	–	28.7%	–	4.1%	–	5.7%	1.1%	1%	42.2%	17.1% (Note: Noem at 1.5%, Pompeo at 1.2%, Perry Johnson at 0.4% Undecided at 14.0%)
FOX News	March 24–27, 2023	426 (RV)	–	1%	24%	–	3%	1%	6%	1%	0%	54%	9% (Note: Cheney at 3%, Abbott at 2%, Noem, Pompeo, and Sununu at 1%, Suarez and Youngkin at 0%, Other at 1%)
Beacon Research/Fox News	March 24–27, 2023	–	–	1%	24%	–	3%	1%	6%	1%	–	54%	8% (Note: Cheney at 3%; Abbott at 2%; Noem, Pompeo, Sununu at 1%)
Quinnipiac University	March 23–27, 2023	671 (RV)	–	1%	33%	–	4%	–	5%	–	1%	47%	7% (Note: Cruz and Noem at 2%; Pompeo, Youngkin, and Sununu at 1%; Perry Johnson at 0%)
Harris Poll	March 22–23, 2023	–	–	–	24%	–	5%	–	7%	0%	2%	50%	6% (Note: Cruz at 2%, Pompeo and Rubio at 1%, Someone Else at 2%)
Monmouth University	March 16–20, 2023	521 (RV)	–	–	27%	–	3%	–	1%	–	1%	41%	6% (Note: Cruz, Paul, and Rice at 1%, Pompeo at <1%, Others at 3%)
Morning Consult	March 17–19, 2023	3,394 (RV)	–	–	26%	–	4%	–	7%	1%	1%	54%	7% (Note: Liz Cheney at 3%; Greg Abbott, Kristi Noem, Mike Pompeo, Glenn Youngkin at 1%)
Big Village	March 15–17, 2023	361 (A)	–	–	23.3%	–	3.6%	–	10.2%	0.5%	–	51.9%	10.4% (Note: Someone else at 10.4%)
Quinnipiac	March 9–13, 2023	677 (RV)	–	1%	32%	–	5%	0%	3%	0%	1%	46%	12% (Note: Cheney and Cruz at 2%; Noem, Pompeo, and Sununu at 1%; Perry Johnson and Youngkin at 0%; Undecided at 5%)
CNN	March 8–12, 2023	963 (LV)	–	–	36%	–	6%	1%	6%	–	2%	40%	8% (Note: Chris Sununu at 2%, Mike Pompeo and Glenn Youngkin at 1%; Someone else at 3%; "No opinion" at 1%)
Premise	March 4–7, 2023	639 (RV)	–	–	23%	–	6%	–	5%	–	1%	55%	11% (Note: Ted Cruz at 4%; Liz Cheney at 3%, Other at 4%)
Morning Consult	March 3–5, 2023	3,071 (RV)	–	–	28%	–	4%	–	7%	0%	1%	53%	5% (Note: Liz Cheney at 2%; Greg Abbott, Kristi Noem, Mike Pompeo, and Glenn Youngkin at 1%)
	March 2, 2023	Perry Johnson declares his candidacy.											
Yahoo News	February 23–27, 2023	444 (RV)	–	0%	29%	–	4%	–	2%	–	–	45%	19% (Note: Pompeo at 3%; Cheney at 1%; Hogan and Youngkin at 0%, Not Sure at 15%)
Susquehanna	February 19–26, 2023	300 (RV)	–	–	37%	–	4%	–	2%	–	1%	32%	20% (Note: Cruz at 2%, Pompeo at 1%, Rubio at 0%, Unsure at 17%)
Emerson College	February 24–25, 2023	536 (RV)	–	–	25%	–	5%	–	8%	–	–	55%	7% (Note: Hogan, Noem, and Pompeo at 1%, Sununu at 0%, Someone Else at 4%)
Morning Consult	February 23–25, 2023	3,320 (RV)	–	–	30%	–	6%	–	7%	1%	1%	48%	7% (Note: Liz Cheney at 3%; Abbott, Noem, Pompeo at 1%; Youngkin at 0%)
Echelon Insights	February 21–23, 2023	419 (LV)	–	–	31%	–	6%	–	9%	–	–	41%	–
McLaughlin & Associates	February 17–23, 2023	441 (LV)	–	–	26%	–	6%	–	5%	1%	1%	42%	21% (Note: Romney at 3%, Cheney and Pompeo at 2%, Abbott, Bolton, Hogan, Sununu, and Youngkin at 1%, Undecided at 9%)
Fox News	February 19–22, 2023	413	–	0%	28%	–	7%	0%	7%	–	1%	43%	14% (Note: Abbott and Liz Cheney at 2%; Noem, Pompeo, Youngkin at 1%; Hogan, Suarez and Sununu at 0%, Others at 5%)
	February 21, 2023	Vivek Ramaswamy declares his candidacy.											
Rasmussen Reports	February 16–20, 2023	–	–	–	24%	–	15%	–	–	–	–	52%	–
Morning Consult	February 17–19, 2023	3,217 (RV)	–	–	30%	–	6%	–	6%	–	–	50%	1% (Note: Noem at 1%)
Big Village	February 15–17, 2023	346 (A)	–	–	23.6%	–	6.8%	–	8.7%	0%	–	50.2%	10.8% (Note: Someone Else at 10.8%)
Harris Poll	February 15–16, 2023	–	–	–	23%	–	6%	–	7%	–	1%	46%	7% (Note: Pompeo at 3%, Rubio at 2%, Cruz at 1%, Someone Else at 1%, Unsure at 9%)
Morning Consult	February 14–16, 2023	2,476 (RV)	–	–	29%	–	5%	–	7%	–	–	50%	1% (Note: Noem at 1%)
WPA Intelligence	February 13–16, 2023	1,000 (LV)	–	–	40%	–	8%	–	8%	–	–	31%	–
	February 14, 2023	Nikki Haley declares her candidacy.											
Quinnipiac University	February 9–14, 2023	592 (RV)	–	–	37%	–	4%	–	4%	–	–	50%	5% (Note: Undecided at 5%)
Quinnipiac University	February 9–14, 2023	592 (RV)	–	0%	31%	–	4%	0%	3%	–	1%	48%	10% (Note: Pompeo at 4%, Cruz at 2%, Cheney at 1%, Hogan, Noem, Sununu, and Youngkin at 0%, Undecided at 4%)
Morning Consult	February 11–13, 2023	2,476 (RV)	–	–	31%	–	4%	–	8%	–	–	47%	1% (Note: Noem at 1%)
Ipsos	February 6–13, 2023	1,465 (RV)	–	1.1%	30.6%	–	3.9%	–	7.5%	–	–	42.6%	6.6% (Note: Cheney at 1.9%, Pompeo at 1.8%, Hogan at 1.2%, Youngkin at 0.6%, Sununu at 0.5%, Other at 0.6%)
Morning Consult	February 8–10, 2023	2,476 (RV)	–	–	29%	–	4%	–	6%	–	–	48%	2% (Note: Noem at 1%)
Morning Consult	February 5–7, 2023	2,476 (RV)	–	–	31%	–	4%	–	6%	–	–	48%	2% (Note: Noem at 1%)
OnMessage	January 30 – February 5, 2023	566 (RV)	–	–	34%	–	6%	–	6%	–	1%	34%	20% (Note: Pompeo at 3%, Cruz, Hogan, Noem, and Rubio at 1%, Other at 2%, Undecided at 11%)
YouGov	February 2–4, 2023	453 (RV)	–	–	35%	–	2%	–	5%	–	–	37%	–
Morning Consult	February 2–4, 2023	2,476 (RV)	–	–	32%	–	3%	–	7%	–	–	48%	2% (Note: Noem at 1%)
Monmouth University	January 26 – February 2, 2023	566 (RV)	–	–	33%	–	1%	–	2%	–	–	33%	7% (Note: Cruz, Paul, and Pompeo at 1%, Others at 4%)
Morning Consult	January 30 – February 1, 2023	2,476 (RV)	–	–	30%	–	2%	–	7%	–	–	51%	2% (Note: Noem at 1%)
Morning Consult	January 27–29, 2023	3,592 (RV)	–	–	31%	–	3%	–	7%	–	–	48%	2% (Note: Noem at 1%)
Morning Consult	January 24–26, 2023	2,476 (RV)	–	–	30%	–	3%	–	7%	–	–	50%	2% (Note: Noem at 1%)
Echelon Insights	January 23–25, 2023	467 (LV)	–	0%	34%	–	2%	–	8%	–	–	36%	8% (Note: Romney at 2%; Bolton, Gabbard, Hawley, Noem Rick Scott and Suarez at 0%)
McLaughlin & Associates	January 19–24, 2023	457 (LV)	–	–	31%	–	3%	–	5%	–	1%	43%	18% (Note: Cheney at 3%, Kasich and Romney at 2%, Hogan, Pompeo, and Youngkin at 1%, Abbott, Bolton, Rubio, and Sununu at 0%, Undecided at 8%)
Morning Consult	January 21–23, 2023	2,476 (RV)	–	–	31%	–	3%	–	7%	–	–	49%	2% (Note: Noem at 1%)
WPA Intelligence	January 17–23, 2023	3,015 (LV)	–	–	33%	–	5%	–	7%	–	–	37%	–
Emerson College	January 19–21, 2023	428 (RV)	–	–	24.8%	–	2.5%	–	7.5%	–	–	55.1%	10.2% (Note: Cheney at 3.6%, Cruz at 3.4%, Hogan at 0.7%, Hawley at 0.4%, Someone Else at 2.1%)
North Star Opinion Research	January 16–21, 2023	1,000 (LV)	–	–	39%	–	4%	–	9%	–	1%	28%	21% (Note: Cheney at 4%, Noem, Hogan, Sununu, and Youngkin at 1%, Would Not Vote at 1%, Undecided at 13%)
Big Village	January 18–20, 2023	355 (A)	–	–	27.5%	–	2.9%	–	6.8%	–	–	52.5%	10.3% (Note: Cruz at 3.5%, Cheney at 2.7%, Sununu at 1.1%, Youngkin at 0.8%, Someone Else at 2.2%)
Harris Poll	January 18–19, 2023	–	–	–	28%	–	3%	–	7%	–	–	48%	0% (Note: Rubio at 3%)
Schoen Cooperman Research	January 14–18, 2023	–	–	–	31%	–	3%	–	8%	–	–	42%	2% (Note: Cotton at 1%)
Morning Consult	January 15–17, 2023	2,476 (RV)	–	–	32%	–	3%	–	8%	–	–	47%	2% (Note: Noem at 1%)
Morning Consult	January 15–17, 2023	2,476 (RV)	–	–	30%	–	3%	–	8%	–	–	48%	2% (Note: Noem at 1%)
YouGov	January 14–17, 2023	472 (RV)	–	–	32%	–	4%	–	5%	–	–	44%	–
YouGov	January 14–17, 2023	500 (A)	–	–	29%	–	5%	–	6%	–	–	44%	3% (Note: Cruz at 2%, Youngkin at 0%, someone else at 1%)
YouGov	January 12–16, 2023	450 (LV)	–	1%	36%	–	1%	–	5%	–	–	37%	–
Morning Consult	January 12–14, 2023	2,476 (RV)	–	–	30%	–	2%	–	8%	–	–	50%	1% (Note: Noem at 1%)
Public Policy Polling	January 10–11, 2023	446 (LV)	–	–	36%	–	6%	–	6%	–	–	42%	–
Morning Consult	January 9–11, 2023	2,476 (RV)	–	–	32%	–	3%	–	8%	–	–	47%	1% (Note: Noem at 1%)
YouGov	January 5–9, 2023	346 (RV)	–	–	34%	–	3%	1%	7%	–	2%	37%	14% (Note: Cruz at 3%, Abbott, Carlson, and Cheney at 2%; Pompeo and Youngkin at 1%, Bolton, Hogan, and Sununu at 0%, Someone Else at 3%)
Morning Consult	January 6–8, 2023	4,470 (RV)	–	–	33%	–	2%	–	9%	–	–	46%	1% (Note: Noem at 0%)
Big Village	January 4–6, 2023	343 (A)	–	–	35%	–	2%	–	8%	–	–	48%	–
Morning Consult	January 3–5, 2023	2,476 (RV)	–	–	32%	–	2%	–	8%	–	–	48%	1% (Note: Noem at 0%)
Morning Consult	December 31, 2022 – January 2, 2023	4,829 (RV)	–	–	34%	–	3%	–	8%	–	–	45%	2% (Note: Noem at 0%)

Polls taken between June and December 2022
Poll source	Date(s) administered	Sample size	Greg Abbott	Liz Cheney	Ted Cruz	Ron DeSantis	Nikki Haley	Larry Hogan	Mike Pence	Mike Pompeo	Marco Rubio	Tim Scott	Chris Sununu	Donald Trump	Glenn Youngkin	Other
Morning Consult	December 28–30, 2022	2,476 (RV)	1%	3%	3%	33%	2%	–	8%	1%	–	1%	–	47%	0%	2% (Note: Noem at 1%)
Morning Consult	December 25–27, 2022	2,476 (RV)	1%	3%	3%	33%	2%	–	8%	1%	–	1%	–	47%	0%	2% (Note: Noem at 1%)
Morning Consult	December 22–24, 2022	2,476 (RV)	1%	3%	2%	31%	3%	–	8%	1%	–	1%	–	48%	1%	2% (Note: Noem at 1%)
Morning Consult	December 19–21, 2022	2,476 (RV)	1%	3%	2%	34%	2%	–	8%	1%	–	1%	–	46%	1%	2% (Note: Noem at 1%)
YouGov	December 15–19, 2022	449 (RV)	–	3%	–	37%	5%	1%	4%	1%	–	–	–	39%	1%	2% (Note: Christie at 1%)
Morning Consult	December 16–18, 2022	4,105 (RV)	1%	2%	3%	33%	2%	–	8%	1%	–	1%	–	48%	0%	2% (Note: Noem at 0%)
Big Village	December 16–18, 2022	357 (A)	–	3%	4%	27%	4%	–	10%	–	–	–	1%	51%	1%	–
Harris Poll	December 14–15, 2022	666 (RV)	–	–	2%	25%	4%	–	6%	2%	1%	1%	–	48%	0%	–
Morning Consult	December 13–15, 2022	2,476 (RV)	1%	2%	3%	32%	2%	–	7%	1%	–	1%	–	48%	0%	2% (Note: Noem at 1%)
Echelon Insights	December 12–14, 2022	418 (RV)	0%	0%	2%	35%	3%	0%	4%	1%	1%	0%	0%	40%	0%	7% (Note: Noem, Romney, Christie and Gabbard at 1%; Bolton, Hawley, Kemp, Suarez and Rick Scott at 0%)
Echelon Insights	December 12–14, 2022	454 (LV)	0%	1%	2%	32%	4%	0%	4%	0%	1%	1%	0%	41%	0%	6% (Note: Kristi Noem at 2%; Rick Scott, Romney, Christie and Gabbard at 1%; Hawley, Kemp, Suarez and Bolton at 0%)
Cygnal	December 12–14, 2022	1,019 (LV)	1%	3%	2%	35%	4%	1%	7%	0%	1%	1%	0%	40%	0%	7% (Note: Christie at 1%; Bolton, Kemp, Noem, Hutchinson, Hawley, Rick Scott and Crenshaw at 0%)
Morning Consult	December 10–14, 2022	825 (RV)	1%	2%	3%	34%	2%	–	6%	1%	–	2%	–	40%	0%	2% (Note: Noem at 0%)
McLaughlin & Associates	December 9–14, 2022	480 (LV)	1%	4%	–	23%	3%	1%	5%	1%	1%	1%	–	48%	1%	5% (Note: Mitt Romney at 2%; Kasich and Bolton at 1%)
Morning Consult	December 10–12, 2022	2,476 (RV)	1%	2%	3%	31%	3%	–	8%	1%	–	1%	–	50%	0%	2% (Note: Noem at 1%)
Monmouth University	December 8–12, 2022	563 (RV)	–	–	1%	39%	1%	–	2%	–	–	–	–	26%	–	–
Morning Consult	December 7–9, 2022	2,476 (RV)	1%	2%	2%	30%	3%	–	9%	1%	–	1%	–	48%	0%	2% (Note: Noem at 1%)
Morning Consult	December 4–6, 2022	2,476 (RV)	1%	3%	3%	30%	2%	–	8%	0%	–	1%	–	50%	0%	2% (Note: Noem at 1%)
YouGov	December 1–5, 2022	435 (RV)	–	3%	–	33%	6%	1%	4%	2%	–	–	–	35%	2%	2% (Note: Chris Christie at 3%)
YouGov	December 1–5, 2022	521 (A)	–	2%	–	30%	5%	1%	5%	2%	–	–	–	35%	2%	2% (Note: Chris Christie at 2%)
Morning Consult	December 1–3, 2022	2,476 (RV)	1%	3%	2%	30%	3%	–	8%	1%	–	1%	–	49%	0%	2% (Note: Noem at 1%)
Big Village	November 30 – December 2, 2022	368 (A)	–	2%	2%	27%	3%	–	7%	–	–	–	1%	56%	0%	–
YouGov	November 26–29, 2022	385 (A)	–	–	3%	30%	3%	–	8%	–	3%	–	–	36%	–	9% (Note: Donald Trump Jr. at 9%)
Cornell University Collaborative Midterm Survey	October 26 – November 25, 2022	3,110 (A)	–	10%	–	28%	4%	–	11%	4%	–	–	–	40%	–	4% (Note: Chris Christie at 4%)
Ipsos	November 18–20, 2022	849 (RV)	1%	2%	2%	37%	3%	2%	6%	0%	0%	0%	0%	25%	1%	2% (Note: Marjorie Taylor Greene at 1%; Bolton at 0%)
Morning Consult	November 18–20, 2022	849 (RV)	–	2%	3%	30%	2%	0%	7%	1%	1%	0%	–	45%	–	5% (Note: Mitt Romney at 2%; Hawley at 1%; Noem, Rick Scott and Christie at 0%)
Emerson College	November 18–19, 2022	614 (RV)	–	4%	3%	25%	3%	1%	8%	–	–	–	–	42%	–	2% (Note: Hawley at 0%)
Echelon Insights	November 17–19, 2022	424 (RV)	0%	1%	3%	31%	1%	1%	11%	1%	1%	0%	0%	42%	0%	6% (Note: Romney at 1%; Gabbard, Bolton, Suarez, Noem, Hawley, Christie and Rick Scott at 0%)
Echelon Insights	November 17–19, 2022	424 (LV)	0%	1%	3%	37%	1%	1%	9%	1%	1%	0%	0%	38%	0%	5% (Note: Romney at 1%; Bolton, Gabbard, Suarez, Noem, Hawley, Christie and Rick Scott at 0%)
Harris Poll	November 16–17, 2022	–	–	–	3%	28%	2%	–	7%	1%	1%	1%	–	46%	1%	–
	November 15, 2022	Donald Trump declares his candidacy.														
Morning Consult	November 10–14, 2022	842 (RV)	–	1%	2%	33%	1%	1%	5%	0%	1%	0%	–	47%	1%	6% (Note: Mitt Romney at 2%; Cotton at 1%; Christie, Rick Scott, Noem and Hawley at 0%)
	November 11, 2022	Corey Stapleton declares his candidacy.														
Zogby Analytics	November 9–11, 2022	864 (LV)	–	–	–	28%	3%	–	8%	–	–	1%	–	47%	1%	4% (Note: Kristi Noem at 2%; Tucker Carlson at 1%)
Big Village	November 9–10, 2022	384 (A)	–	3%	–	34%	–	–	10%	–	–	–	–	50%	–	–
	November 8, 2022	2022 midterm elections														
Morning Consult	November 2–7, 2022	1,691 (RV)	–	–	2%	26%	2%	0%	7%	–	1%	1%	–	48%	–	5% (Note: Mitt Romney at 2%; Cotton and Noem at 1%; Rick Scott and Hawley at 0%)
Big Village	November 2–4, 2022	290 (LV)	–	3%	–	30%	–	–	12%	–	–	–	–	48%	–	–
Big Village	November 2–4, 2022	373 (A)	–	3%	–	27%	–	–	12%	–	–	–	–	56%	–	–
Big Village	October 31 – November 2, 2022	272 (LV)	–	2%	–	28%	–	–	13%	–	–	–	–	53%	–	–
Big Village	October 31 – November 2, 2022	354 (A)	–	3%	–	26%	–	–	12%	–	–	–	–	56%	–	–
Morning Consult	October 28–31, 2022	838 (RV)	–	2%	2%	24%	3%	0%	9%	1%	1%	0%	–	49%	–	5% (Note: Mitt Romney at 2%; Christie at 1%; Cotton, Noem and Rick Scott at 0%)
YouGov	October 11–26, 2022	1,720 (RV)	3%	2%	–	33%	14%	–	–	–	–	–	1%	55%	1%	–
YouGov	October 17–19, 2022	–	–	–	3%	29%	4%	–	6%	0%	–	0%	–	53%	–	–
McLaughlin & Associates	October 12–17, 2022	454 (LV)	1%	1%	–	23%	–	0%	7%	–	1%	0%	–	53%	–	4% (Note: Tom Cotton at 4%; Romney, Bolton and Kasich at 1%)
Harris Poll	October 12–13, 2022	724 (RV)	–	–	3%	17%	2%	–	7%	2%	3%	1%	0%	55%	–	–
Cygnal	October 10–12, 2022	1,204 (LV)	1%	3%	2%	26%	3%	1%	9%	1%	1%	0%	0%	45%	0%	4% (Note: Cotton, Hutchinson, Hawley, Crenshaw, Kemp, Noem, Christie and Rick Scott at 0%)
Siena College/The New York Times Upshot	October 9–12, 2022	332 (LV)	–	–	3%	28%	4%	–	7%	2%	–	–	–	47%	–	–
Siena College/The New York Times Upshot	October 9–12, 2022	332 (RV)	–	–	4%	26%	3%	–	6%	2%	–	–	–	49%	–	6% (Note: Mitt Romney at 2%; Cotton and Kasich at 1%; Owens, Rick Scott and Noem at 0%)
Big Village	October 5–7, 2022	287 (RV)	–	3%	–	28%	–	–	11%	–	–	–	–	55%	–	–
Big Village	October 5–7, 2022	372 (A)	–	3%	–	23%	–	–	10%	–	–	–	–	58%	–	–
Big Village	September 17–22, 2022	323 (RV)	–	2%	–	24%	–	–	12%	–	–	–	–	59%	–	–
Big Village	September 17–22, 2022	378 (A)	–	2%	–	24%	–	–	12%	–	–	–	–	61%	–	–
McLaughlin & Associates	September 17–22, 2022	465 (LV)	2%	2%	0%	18%	0%	1%	6%	0%	2%	1%	–	55%	–	6% (Note: Mitt Romney and John Bolton at 2%; Cotton and Kasich at 1%; Owens, Rick Scott and Noem at 0%)
Morning Consult	September 16–18, 2022	831 (RV)	–	3%	2%	19%	2%	0%	8%	1%	1%	1%	–	52%	–	5% (Note: Mitt Romney at 3%; Cotton, Christie and Noem at 1%; Hawley at 0%)
TIPP Insights	September 7–9, 2022	534 (RV)	1%	1%	2%	15%	2%	–	8%	1%	2%	1%	–	54%	–	5% (Note: Cotton, Hawley and Noem at 1%; Rick Scott, Stefanik and Christie at 0%)
Big Village	September 7–9, 2022	337 (A)	–	2%	–	20%	–	–	13%	–	–	–	–	61%	–	–
Harris Poll	September 7–8, 2022	667 (RV)	–	–	1%	17%	2%	–	9%	1%	1%	1%	–	59%	–	–
Big Village	August 20–24, 2022	329 (A)	–	2%	–	22%	–	–	11%	–	–	–	–	59%	–	–
McLaughlin & Associates	August 20–24, 2022	461 (LV)	2%	3%	0%	15%	0%	2%	6%	0%	1%	1%	–	55%	–	8% (Note: Mitt Romney at 4%; John Bolton at 2%; Cotton and Kasich at 1%; Owens, Rick Scott and Noem at 0%)
Echelon Insights	August 19–22, 2022	422 (RV)	–	4%	–	22%	–	2%	12%	1%	–	–	–	46%	–	2% (Note: Christie at 2%)
Echelon Insights	August 19–22, 2022	459 (LV)	–	5%	–	25%	–	1%	13%	1%	–	–	–	46%	–	1% (Note: Christie at 1%)
Morning Consult	August 19–21, 2022	846 (RV)	–	3%	2%	18%	3%	1%	8%	0%	1%	1%	–	57%	–	4% (Note: Noem and Christie at 1%; Cotton, Hawley and Rick Scott at 0%)
Big Village	August 10–12, 2022	342 (A)	–	0%	–	16%	–	–	11%	–	–	–	–	68%	–	–
Morning Consult	August 10, 2022	872 (RV)	–	2%	2%	18%	2%	1%	8%	1%	1%	1%	–	56%	–	5% (Note: Mitt Romney at 2%; Christie at 1%; Cotton, Noem and Rick Scott at 0%)
TIPP Insights	August 2–4, 2022	575 (RV)	1%	1%	3%	17%	1%	–	10%	1%	1%	0%	–	53%	–	6% (Note: Chris Christie at 2%; Rick Scott at 1%; Hawley, Stefanik, Cotton, Sasse and Noem at 0%)
Harris Poll	July 27–28, 2022	679 (RV)	–	–	3%	19%	5%	–	7%	1%	1%	1%	–	52%	–	–
Suffolk University	July 22–25, 2022	414 (RV)	–	3%	–	34%	3%	–	7%	1%	–	–	–	43%	–	1% (Note: Chris Christie at 1%)
Morning Consult	July 15–17, 2022	840 (RV)	–	2%	3%	23%	2%	0%	7%	1%	1%	1%	–	53%	–	5% (Note: Romney at 2%; Kristi Noem at 1%; Christie, Cotton, Hawley and Rick Scott at 0%)
Morning Consult	July 8–10, 2022	840 (RV)	–	2%	2%	21%	3%	1%	8%	1%	1%	0%	–	52%	–	5% (Note: Romney, Noem and Christie at 1%; Cotton, Hawley and Rick Scott at 0%)
Siena College/The New York Times Upshot	July 5–7, 2022	350 (LV)	–	–	7%	25%	5%	0%	6%	2%	2%	–	–	49%	–	5% (Note: Mitt Romney at 2%; Cotton, Christie at 1%; Hawley and Rick Scott at 0%)
Harris Poll	June 29–30, 2022	474 (RV)	–	–	1%	16%	4%	–	7%	1%	2%	2%	–	56%	–	
Harris Poll	June 29–30, 2022	474 (RV)	–	–	–	20%	3%	–	9%	1%	–	–	–	55%	–	–
Morning Consult	June 24–26, 2022	2,004 (RV)	–	1%	2%	23%	2%	0%	8%	0%	2%	0%	–	51%	–	5% (Note: Mitt Romney at 2%; Cotton, Christie at 1%; Hawley and Rick Scott at 0%)
McLaughlin & Associates	June 17–22, 2022	436 (LV)	1%	1%	–	15%	–	1%	7%	–	2%	1%	–	59%	–	9% (Note: Mitt Romney at 4%; Candace Owens at 3%; Cotton, Kasich at 1%; Bolton at 0%)
TIPP Insights	June 8–10, 2022	385 (RV)	1%	–	2%	12%	4%	–	7%	0%	2%	2%	–	55%	–	5% (Note: Josh Hawley at 2%; Christie, Stefanik at 1%, Cotton, Sasse, Rick Scott, Noem at 0%)

Polls taken between 2020 and June 2022
Source of poll	Dates administered	Sample size	Margin	Ted Cruz	Ron DeSantis	Nikki Haley	Mike Pence	Donald Trump	Other	Undecided (Note: Calculated by taking the difference of 100% and all other candidates combined.)
	March 10, 2022	Corey Stapleton forms his exploratory committee.								
Harvard/Harris	January 19–20, 2022	1,815 (RV)	–	4%	12%	2%	11%	57%	13% (Note: Marco Rubio at 3%; Mike Pompeo at 2%; Tim Scott at 1%; and "Someone else" at 7%)	–
McLaughlin & Associates	January 13–18, 2022	468 (LV)	–	–	13%	4%	9%	53%	–	8%
John Bolton Super PAC	January 6, 2022	501 (LV)	–	5%	19%	4%	4%	36%	–	22%
UMass Amherst	December 14–20, 2021	306 (A)	–	6%	20%	7%	6%	55%	–	–
McLaughlin & Associates	November 11–16, 2021	450 (LV)	–	2%	15%	3%	7%	55%	6%	8%
Zogby Analytics	November 8–10, 2021	371 (LV)	–	2%	7%	5%	12%	59%	6% (Note: "Someone else" at 4%; Greg Abbott at 2%)	4%
YouGov/Yahoo News	November 4–8, 2021	559 (A)	–	–	21%	5%	4%	44%	1% (Note: Glenn Youngkin at 1%, Tucker Carlson at 3%)	19%
Harvard/Harris	October 26–28, 2021	490 (LV)	±4.0%	–	10%	–	9%	47%	15%	19%
YouGov/Yahoo News	October 19–21, 2021	629 (A)	–	–	18%	4%	5%	41%	2% (Note: Tucker Carlson, Josh Hawley, Tom Cotton, and Kristi Noem at 1%)	24%
Echelon Insights (Archive)	October 15–19, 2021	476 (RV)	–	–	–	–	–	66% (Note: Standard VI response)	31%	4%
McLaughlin & Associates	October 14–18, 2021	463 (LV)	–	3%	10%	4%	9%	53%	9% (Note: Candace Owens at 3%; Greg Abbott, Liz Cheney, Tom Cotton, John Kasich, Kristi Noem and Rick Scott at 1%)	6%
Morning Consult	October 8–11, 2021	803 (RV)	–	3%	12%	3%	12%	47%	6% (Note: Liz Cheney at 2%; Tom Cotton, Kristi Noem and Rick Scott at 1%)	4%
Echelon Insights	September 17–23, 2021	479 (RV)	–	–	–	–	–	59%	32%	9%
John Bolton Super PAC	September 16–18, 2021	1,000 (LV)	± 3.1%	5%	25%	6%	3%	26%	10% (Note: Chris Christie at 7%; Kristi Noem at 3%, Josh Hawley at 1%)	20%
Harvard/Harris	September 15–16, 2021	490 (LV)	±4.0%	–	9%	3%	13%	58%	0%	14%
McLaughlin & Associates	September 9–14, 2021	456 (LV)	–	3%	8%	2%	10%	59%	7% (Note: Liz Cheney and John Kasich at 2%; Tom Cotton, Candace Owens and Rick Scott at 1%; Kristi Noem at 0%)	4%
Emerson College	August 30 – September 1, 2021	395 (RV)	± 4.9%	2%	10%	7%	6%	67%	5% (Note: "Someone else" at 5%; Josh Hawley at 1%, Tom Cotton at 0%)	1%
McLaughlin & Associates	July 29 – August 3, 2021	467 (LV)	–	3%	11%	4%	8%	54%	7% (Note: John Kasich, Kristi Noem and Candace Owens at 2%; Liz Cheney at 1%; Tom Cotton and Rick Scott at 0%)	6%
YouGov/Yahoo News	July 30 – August 2, 2021	518 (A)	–	–	13%	4%	3%	58%	1% (Note: Tucker Carlson at 2%, Kristi Noem at 1%; Tom Cotton at 0%)	17%
Fabrizio, Lee & Associates	July 6–8, 2021	800 (RV)	± 3.5%	2%	19%	3%	8%	47%	2% (Note: Tom Cotton, Larry Hogan, and Kristi Noem at 1%; Chris Christie and Rick Scott at 0%)	13%
John Bolton Super PAC	July 8, 2021	1,000 (LV)	–	5%	13%	5%	6%	46%	22%	–
Echelon Insights	June 18–22, 2021	386 (RV)	–	–	–	–	–	59%	35%	6%
McLaughlin & Associates	June 16–20, 2021	444 (LV)	–	4%	9%	3%	8%	55%	8% (Note: Candace Owens at 4%; Liz Cheney, Tom Cotton, John Kasich and Rick Scott at 1%; Kristi Noem at 0%)	7%
YouGov/Yahoo News	May 24–26, 2021	378 (A)	–	–	–	–	–	65%	19% (Note: "Trump should not run again in 2024" as opposed to "Trump should run again in 2024" at 19%)	16%
Quinnipiac	May 18–24, 2021	~290 (A) (Note: 22% of a full sample of 1,316 adults)	–	–	–	–	–	66%	30% (Note: "Do not want Trump to run" as opposed to "want Trump to run" at 30%)	4%
McLaughlin & Associates	May 12–18, 2021	444 (LV)	–	3%	8%	5%	10%	57%	7% (Note: Candace Owens at 3%; John Kasich, Liz Cheney, Tucker Carlson, Rick Scott, and Kristi Noem at 1%; Tom Cotton at 0%)	7%
Echelon Insights	May 14–17, 2021	479 (RV)	–	–	–	–	–	63%	31%	6%
Morning Consult/Politico	May 14–17, 2021	782 (RV)	± 2%	4%	8%	4%	13%	48%	9% (Note: Would not vote at 4%; "Someone else" at 2%; Liz Cheney and Kristi Noem at 1%; Rick Scott at 0%)	–
YouGov/Yahoo News	May 11–13, 2021	348 (A)	–	–	–	–	–	68%	22% (Note: "Trump should not run again in 2024" as opposed to "Trump should run again in 2024" at 22%)	10%
Trafalgar Group	April 30 – May 6, 2021	– (LV) (Note: Republican subsample of total sample of 1574 likely voters)	–	–	–	–	–	62%	27% (Note: "Unlikely or very unlikely to vote for Trump" as opposed to "Absolute will or likely to vote for Trump" at 24%; Would not vote at 3%)	11% (Note: "Consider voting for Trump" at 8%; Undecided at 4%)
Echelon Insights	April 16–23, 2021	440 (RV)	–	–	–	–	–	59%	35%	6%
McLaughlin & Associates	April 8–13, 2021	441 (LV)	1%	3%	7%	2%	10%	55%	8% (Note: John Kasich at 3%; Candace Owens at 2%; Tom Cotton, Rick Scott at 1%; Kristi Noem at 0%)	9%
PEM Management Corporation	April 3–7, 2021	494 (LV)	–	7%	9%	9%	6%	44%	1% (Note: Kristi Noem at 1%)	–
Echelon Insights	March 15–21, 2021	1,008 (RV)	–	–	–	–	–	60%	30%	10%
Fabrizio, Lee & Associates/The Hill	February 20 – March 2, 2021	1,264 (LV)	± 2.7%	3%	7%	6%	9%	51%	3% (Note: Tom Cotton, Josh Hawley, Larry Hogan, and Kristi Noem at 1%; Chris Christie and Rick Scott at 0%)	12%
Fabrizio, Lee & Associates/The Hill	February 20 – March 2, 2021	1,264 (LV)	± 2.7%	–	–	–	–	57% (Note: On whether voters thought they'd support a Trump primary campaign if he ran)	16% (Note: "Would definitely not vote for Trump" at 16%)	27%
McLaughlin & Associates	February 24–28, 2021	448 (LV)	–	5%	4%	3%	8%	54%	9% (Note: Candace Owens at 3%; Tom Cotton and John Kasich at 2%; Kristi Noem, Tucker Carlson, and Tim Scott at 1%; Rick Scott at 0%)	10%
Harvard/Harris	February 23–25, 2021	546 (RV)	–	5%	–	7%	18%	52%	13% (Note: "Someone else" at 12%; Josh Hawley at 2%, Tom Cotton at 1%)	–
Echelon Insights	February 12–18, 2021	430 (RV)	–	–	–	–	–	55%	32%	14%
Morning Consult/Politico	February 14–15, 2021	645 (RV)	± 4%	4%	–	6%	12%	54%	10% (Note: Would not vote at 5%; "Someone else" at 3%; Tom Cotton, Josh Hawley, Larry Hogan, and Kristi Noem at 1%; Rick Scott at 0%)	–
Echelon Insights	January 20–26, 2021	– (RV) (Note: GOP and GOP-leaning subsample of a full sample of 1,006 registered voters)	–	–	–	–	–	48%	40%	11%
	January 20, 2021	Inauguration of Joe Biden								
Léger	January 15–17, 2021	1,007 (A) (Note: Among all adults (no Republican crosstab published). The same pollster showed 25% for Trump and 19% for Romney in November, when taking into account all voters and not only Republicans.)	± 3.09%	6%	2%	7%	13%	29%	6% (Note: Larry Hogan at 6%, Ben Sasse at 3%; Rick Scott at 2%; Josh Hawley, Ivanka Trump at 1%)	–
Ipsos/Axios	January 11–13, 2021	334 (A)	± 5.8%	–	–	–	–	57%	41%	1% (Note: Listed as "Skipped")
Morning Consult/Politico	January 8–11, 2021	702 (RV)	–	7%	–	6%	18%	40%	15% (Note: Would not vote at 6%; "Someone else" at 5%; Kristi Noem at 2%; Tom Cotton, Josh Hawley, and Rick Scott at 1%)	–
	January 6, 2021	January 6 United States Capitol attack								
McLaughlin & Associates	December 9–13, 2020	442 (LV)	–	5%	1%	3%	11%	56%	5% (Note: Tucker Carlson at 3%, John Kasich and Kristi Noem at 2%; Tom Cotton at 1%; Rick Scott at 0%)	10%
Fox News	December 6–9, 2020	~ 413 (RV)	± 4.5%	–	–	–	–	71%	21% (Note: "Would not like to see Trump run for president in 2024" at 21%)	8%
McLaughlin & Associates/Newsmax	November 21–23, 2020	442 (LV)	± 3.1%	4%	2%	4%	9%	53%	6% (Note: John Kasich at 3%; Tom Cotton, Kristi Noem, Tucker Carlson, and Rick Scott at 1%)	15%
Morning Consult/Politico	November 21–23, 2020	765 (RV)	± 2%	4%	–	4%	12%	53%	11% (Note: Would not vote at 5%; "Someone else" at 3%; Kristi Noem, Josh Hawley, and Rick Scott at 1%; Charlie Baker at 0%)	–
HarrisX/The Hill	November 17–19, 2020	599 (RV)	± 2.26%	–	–	–	–	75%	25%	–
Seven Letter Insight	November 10–19, 2020	~555 (V) (Note: 37% of the full sample of 1,500 2020 general election voters)	± 2.5%	6%	–	7%	19%	35%	4% (Note: Ivanka Trump and Tucker Carlson at 2%; Tom Cotton, Josh Hawley and Ben Sasse at 1%)	–
Léger	November 13–15, 2020	304 (A) (Note: Among 304 republican adults as opposed to all adults)	± 3.09%	7%	–	4%	22%	45%	5% (Note: Tucker Carlson at 4%, John Kasich and Rick Scott at 2%; Rick Santorum at 1%)	–
	November 3, 2020	2020 presidential election								
YouGov/Washington Examiner	October 30, 2020	– (RV) (Note: Republican subsample of 1,200 registered voters)	–	–	–	–	–	38%	43% (Note: Respondents who think Trump should do something other than running for president in 2024 at 43%)	–

=== Favorability polling ===
Unlike traditional preference polling, favorability ratings allow individuals to independently rate each candidate. This provides a comprehensive impression of a candidate's electorate appeal without vote splitting distortion, where votes divide between ideologically similar candidates in multi-candidate polls. Favorability indicates general candidate acceptance among voters, irrespective of final vote choice. The table uses net favorability (favorable minus unfavorable) among Republicans.

Poll source	Date(s) administered	Sample size	Doug Burgum	Chris Christie	Ron DeSantis	Larry Elder	Nikki Haley	Asa Hutchinson	Mike Pence	Vivek Ramaswamy	Tim Scott	Donald Trump
Economist/YouGov	January 7–9, 2024	450 (A)										66%
Morning Consult	January 4–7, 2024	825 (LV)		−27%	49%		24%	−3%		44%		61%
Economist/YouGov	Dec 31, 2023 – Jan 2, 2024	440 (A)		−38%	56%		26%	−15%		20%		68%
Morning Consult	December 28–30, 2023	837 (LV)		−19%	39%		16%	−7%		29%		60%
Gallup	December 1–20, 2023	281 (A)			39%		20%					60%
Economist/YouGov	December 16–18, 2023	448 (A)										57%
Yahoo/YouGov	December 14–18, 2023	428 (A)										57%
Quinnipiac	December 14–18, 2023	(RV)			49%		17%					72%
Morning Consult	December 15–17, 2023	846 (LV)		−23%	37%		24%	−3%		24%		56%
Echelon Insights	December 12–16, 2023	467 (LV)		−31%	41%		27%			31%		65%

=== Head-to-head polling ===
Ron DeSantis versus Donald Trump head-to-head
View source data.

Poll source	Date(s) administered	Sample size	Ron DeSantis	Donald Trump	Undecided/ Other
Noble Predictive Insights/The Center Square	October 20–26, 2023	925 (LV)	32%	68%	–
Echelon Insights	October 23–26, 2023	430 (LV)	23%	71%	6%
Echelon Insights	March 27–29, 2023	370 (RV)	34%	59%	7%
Harris Poll	March 22–23, 2023	–	44%	56%	–
Premise	March 4–7, 2023	639 (RV)	37%	53%	10%
Echelon Insights	February 17–23, 2023	419 (LV)	42%	53%	5%
McLaughlin & Associates	February 17–23, 2023	441 (LV)	38%	56%	6%
Big Village	February 15–17, 2023	346 (A)	39%	61%	–
Harris Poll	February 15–16, 2023	–	44%	56%	–
WPA Intelligence	February 13–16, 2023	1,000 (RV)	55%	37%	12%
Rasmussen Reports	February 8–12, 2023	–	32%	45%	23%
YouGov	February 2–6, 2023	453 (RV)	45%	41%	14%
OnMessage	January 30 – February 5, 2023	1,000 (LV)	53%	38%	9%
Monmouth University	January 26 – February 2, 2023	566 (RV)	53%	40%	7%
Echelon Insights	January 23–25, 2023	467 (LV)	48%	43%	9%
McLaughlin & Associates	January 19–24, 2023	457 (LV)	41%	52%	7%
WPA Intelligence	January 17–23, 2023	3,015 (LV)	49%	40%	11%
North Star Opinion Research	January 16–21, 2023	1,000 (LV)	44%	28%	28%
North Star Opinion Research	January 16–21, 2023	1,000 (LV)	52%	30%	18%
Big Village	January 18–20, 2023	355 (A)	39%	61%	–
Marquette University	January 9–20, 2023	352 (RV)	64%	36%	–
Marquette University	January 9–20, 2023	401 (A)	62%	38%	–
Harris Poll	January 18–19, 2023	–	45%	55%	–
Schoen Cooperman Research	January 14–18, 2023	–	45%	46%	9%
YouGov	January 12–16, 2023	450 (RV)	45%	42%	13%
Public Policy Polling	January 10–11, 2023	446 (LV)	43%	42%	15%
YouGov	January 5–9, 2023	346 (A)	51%	49%	–
YouGov	December 15–19, 2022	390 (A)	48%	40%	12%
YouGov	December 15–19, 2022	450 (RV)	45%	43%	12%
Harris Poll	December 14–15, 2022	666 (RV)	52%	48%	–
Echelon Insights	December 12–14, 2022	418 (RV)	48%	46%	6%
Echelon Insights	December 12–14, 2022	454 (LV)	47%	46%	7%
Morning Consult	December 10–14, 2022	825 (RV)	45%	44%	9%
McLaughlin & Associates	December 9–14, 2022	480 (LV)	36%	58%	6%
Suffolk University	December 7–11, 2022	374 (RV)	56%	33%	11%
Fabrizio, Lee & Associates	December 3–7, 2022	267 (RV)	52%	38%	10%
YouGov	December 1–5, 2022	435 (RV)	47%	42%	11%
YouGov	December 1–5, 2022	521 (A)	42%	42%	16%
Marquette University	November 15–22, 2022	318 (A)	60%	40%	–
Marquette University	November 15–22, 2022	383 (A)	57%	42%	–
Quinnipiac University	November 16–20, 2022	–	45%	43%	13%
Quinnipiac University	November 16–20, 2022	–	44%	44%	12%
Echelon Insights	November 17–19, 2022	424 (RV)	40%	52%	8%
Echelon Insights	November 17–19, 2022	424 (LV)	46%	46%	8%
YouGov	November 13–15, 2022	432 (A)	46%	39%	15%
Léger	November 11–13, 2022	316 (A)	45%	43%	12%
YouGov	November 9–11, 2022	–	42%	35%	23%
	November 8, 2022	2022 midterm elections			
Echelon Insights	October 24–26, 2022	405 (RV)	32%	60%	8%
Echelon Insights	October 24–26, 2022	455 (LV)	34%	56%	10%
YouGov	October 11–26, 2022	1,720 (RV)	45%	55%	–
YouGov	October 13–17, 2022	473 (RV)	36%	45%	19%
YouGov	October 13–17, 2022	570 (A)	35%	45%	20%
McLaughlin & Associates	October 12–17, 2022	454 (LV)	29%	64%	7%
YouGov	September 23–27, 2022	456 (RV)	34%	46%	20%
YouGov	September 23–27, 2022	573 (A)	32%	45%	23%
Echelon Insights	August 1 – September 7, 2022	490 (LV)	35%	57%	8%
YouGov	September 2–6, 2022	467 (RV)	37%	49%	14%
YouGov	September 2–6, 2022	547 (A)	34%	48%	18%
YouGov	August 18–22, 2022	460 (RV)	31%	49%	20%
YouGov	August 18–22, 2022	547 (A)	31%	49%	20%
YouGov	July 28 – August 1, 2022	428 (LV)	35%	44%	21%
YouGov	July 28 – August 1, 2022	504 (A)	34%	44%	22%
Echelon Insight	July 15–18, 2022	408 (RV)	30%	59%	11%
Echelon Insight	July 15–18, 2022	431 (LV)	32%	56%	12%
YouGov	July 8–11, 2022	488 (RV)	31%	47%	22%
YouGov	July 8–11, 2022	575 (A)	29%	50%	21%
YouGov	June 24–27, 2022	457 (RV)	36%	44%	20%
YouGov	June 24–27, 2022	542 (A)	33%	45%	27%

Nikki Haley versus Donald Trump head-to-head

Poll source	Date(s) administered	Sample size	Nikki Haley	Donald Trump	Undecided/ Other
Echelon Insights	October 23–26, 2023	430 (LV)	21%	73%	6%
Noble Predictive Insights/The Center Square	October 20–26, 2023	925 (LV)	27%	73%	–

Mike Pence versus Donald Trump head-to-head
View source data.

Poll source	Date(s) administered	Sample size	Mike Pence	Donald Trump	Undecided/ Other
Public Policy Polling	January 10–11, 2023	446 (LV)	25%	65%	10%
Fabrizio, Lee & Associates	December 3–7, 2022	270 (RV)	28%	63%	9%
YouGov	June 24–27, 2022	457 (RV)	18%	65%	17%
YouGov	June 24–27, 2022	542 (A)	18%	61%	21%
YouGov	June 24–27, 2022	457 (RV)	18%	65%	17%
YouGov	June 24–27, 2022	542 (A)	18%	61%	21%
Echelon Insights	April 18–20, 2022	436 (RV)	25%	68%	7%
Echelon Insights	April 18–20, 2022	459 (LV)	28%	64%	8%

Polls without Donald Trump

Poll source	Date(s) administered	Sample size	Margin of error	Tucker Carlson	Ted Cruz	Ron DeSantis	Nikki Haley	Josh Hawley	Larry Hogan	Mike Pence	Mike Pompeo	Vivek Ramaswamy	Mitt Romney	Marco Rubio	Tim Scott	Donald Trump Jr.	Other	Undecided
HarrisX/The Blockchain Association	November 24–26, 2023	666 (RV)	–	–	–	32%	16%	–	–	–	–	17%	–	–	–	–	14% (Note: "Someone else" with 6%; Chris Christie with 4%; Asa Hutchinson with 2%; Ryan Binkley & Doug Burgum with 1%)	21%
HarrisX/The Messenger	October 30 – November 1, 2023	753 (RV)	–	–	–	36%	12%	–	–	–	–	16%	–	–	5%	–	9% (Note: Christie and Someone Else at 3%; Burgum, Hutchinson and Stapleton at 1%; Binkley at 0%)	18%
HarrisX/The Messenger	August 24–28, 2023	685 (RV)	–	–	–	33%	6%	–	–	12%	–	23%	–	–	3%	–	9% (Note: "Someone else" at 3%; Christie at 2%; Binkley, Burgum, Hutchinson and Johnson at 1%; Elder, Hurd, Stapleton and Suarez at 0%)	14%
HarrisX/American Free Enterprise Chamber of Commerce	August 17–21, 2023	1,057 (LV)	–	–	–	27%	4%	–	–	8%	–	22%	–	–	5%	–	16% (Note: Christie at 4%; Elder at 2%; Binkley, Burgum, Hutchinson, Johnson, Stapleton and Suarez at 1%; Hurd at 0%; Someone Else at 4%)	17%
Harvard/Harris	October 12–13, 2022	724 (RV)	–	–	9%	40%	3%	–	–	18%	3%	–	–	4%	1%	–	5%	17%
Cygnal	October 10–12, 2022	1,204 (LV)	–	–	4%	46%	4%	0%	1%	17%	2%	–	–	2%	1%	–	11% (Note: Liz Cheney at 3%; Greg Abbott at 2%; Chris Christie, Tom Cotton, Dan Crenshaw, Brian Kemp, Kristi Noem, and Glenn Youngkin at 1%.)	14%
McLaughlin & Associates	September 17–22, 2022	465 (LV)	–	–	6%	31%	3%	–	2%	11%	3%	–	2%	2%	1%	19%	13% (Note: Greg Abbott, Liz Cheney, and Candace Owens at 2%; John Bolton, Tom Cotton, John Kasich, Kristi Noem, and Rick Scott at 1%.)	12%
Echelon Insights	September 16–19, 2022	465 (LV)	–	–	5%	49%	2%	1%	0%	10%	1%	–	3%	2%	0%	6%	8% (Note: "Someone Else" at 3%; Chris Christie at 2%; Greg Abbott, Liz Cheney, and Glenn Youngkin at 1%.)	11%
Harvard/Harris	September 7–8, 2022	667 (RV)	–	–	6%	39%	5%	–	–	18%	4%	–	–	3%	1%	–	4%	20%
McLaughlin & Associates	August 20–24, 2022	461 (LV)	–	–	3%	26%	4%	–	2%	13%	1%	–	4%	2%	2%	18%	15% (Note: Greg Abbott at 3%; Liz Cheney, John Kasich, Kristi Noem, and Candace Owens at 2%; John Bolton, Tom Cotton, Richard Grenell, and Rick Scott at 1%.)	12%
Echelon Insights	August 19–22, 2022	459 (LV)	–	–	5%	41%	5%	0%	1%	10%	0%	–	1%	1%	0%	11%	7% (Note: Liz Cheney at 3%; Greg Abbott, Kristi Noem, Rick Scott, and Glenn Youngkin at 1%.)	17%
Harvard/Harris	July 27–28, 2022	679 (RV)	–	–	7%	34%	7%	–	–	19%	3%	–	–	3%	1%	–	3%	22%
Echelon Insights	July 15–18, 2022	431 (LV)	–	–	4%	45%	3%	0%	0%	12%	2%	–	2%	2%	1%	9%	5% (Note: Chris Christie at 2%; Liz Cheney, Kristi Noem, and Glenn Youngkin at 1%.)	13%
Harvard/Harris	June 29–30, 2022	474 (RV)	–	–	8%	36%	5%	–	–	17%	3%	–	–	3%	2%	–	8%	19%
McLaughlin & Associates	June 17–22, 2022	436 (LV)	–	–	4%	32%	3%	–	1%	12%	3%	–	3%	3%	2%	17%	11% (Note: Candace Owens at 4%; Greg Abbott at 2%; Liz Cheney, Tom Cotton, John Kasich, Kristi Noem, and Rick Scott at 1%.)	11%
Echelon Insights	June 17–20, 2022	409 (LV)	–	–	6%	39%	3%	1%	0%	18%	0%	–	3%	2%	0%	7%	5% (Note: Liz Cheney at 2%; Greg Abbott, Chris Christie, Tom Cotton, and Glenn Youngkin at 1%.)	15%
Zogby Analytics	May 23–24, 2022	408 (LV)	± 4.9%	–	12%	27%	4%	–	–	23%	3%	–	–	5%	–	–	13% (Note: "Someone Else," at 6%; Glenn Youngkin at 4%; Greg Abbott at 3%.)	15%
Echelon Insights	May 20–23, 2022	451 (LV)	–	–	7%	34%	3%	1%	1%	17%	0%	–	1%	2%	1%	17%	8% (Note: "Someone Else," at 2%; Greg Abbott, Liz Cheney, Chris Christie, Kristi Noem, Rick Scott, and Marjorie Taylor Greene at 1%.)	18%
Harvard/Harris	May 18–19, 2022	–	–	–	9%	25%	5%	–	–	15%	2%	–	–	3%	2%	–	9%	29%
McLaughlin & Associates	April 22–26, 2022	464 (LV)	–	–	6%	31%	2%	–	1%	11%	1%	–	4%	3%	1%	16%	12% (Note: Greg Abbott and Candace Owens at 3%; John Bolton, Tom Cotton, Liz Cheney, Richard Grenell, John Kasich, and Rick Scott at 1%.)	13%
Harvard/Harris	April 20–21, 2022	708 (RV)	–	–	8%	35%	7%	–	–	20%	1%	–	–	3%	1%	–	6%	18%
Echelon Insights	April 18–20, 2022	459 (LV)	–	–	7%	35%	6%	0%	2%	15%	2%	–	2%	3%	1%	5%	4% (Note: "Someone Else," Greg Abbott, Liz Cheney, and Tom Cotton at 1%.)	17%
Harvard/Harris	March 23–24, 2022	719 (RV)	–	–	10%	28%	6%	–	–	24%	3%	–	–	5%	2%	–	5%	16%
McLaughlin & Associates	March 17–22, 2022	459 (LV)	–	–	5%	26%	4%	–	1%	15%	2%	–	3%	2%	1%	16%	7% (Note: Candace Owens at 3%; Greg Abbott at 2%; Tom Cotton and Kristi Noem at 1%.)	17%
Echelon Insights	March 18–21, 2022	475 (LV)	–	–	5%	31%	6%	1%	1%	16%	1%	–	6%	3%	1%	8%	3% (Note: Liz Cheney, Kristi Noem, and Rick Scott at 1%.)	17%
Harvard/Harris	February 23–24, 2022	729 (RV)	–	–	11%	33%	5%	–	–	25%	5%	–	–	4%	3%	–	14%	–
Echelon Insights	February 19–23, 2022	451 (LV)	–	–	8%	27%	5%	1%	1%	18%	2%	–	2%	3%	1%	7%	10% (Note: Liz Cheney and Tom Cotton at 2%; Greg Abbott, Chris Christie, Kristi Noem, Ben Sasse, Rick Scott, and Glenn Youngkin at 1%.)	–
McLaughlin & Associates	February 16–22, 2022	463 (LV)	–	–	5%	27%	3%	–	0%	11%	2%	–	3%	2%	1%	17%	14% (Note: Candace Owens at 4%; Greg Abbott, Tom Cotton, John Kasich, and Kristi Noem at 2%; Liz Cheney and Rick Scott at 1%.)	13%
Morning Consult/Politico	January 22–23, 2022	463 (RV)	–	–	6%	25%	4%	–	1%	12%	1%	–	2%	1%	1%	24%	6% (Note: "Someone Else" at 14%; Liz Cheney, Chris Christie, and Kristi Noem at 1%.)	–
Echelon Insights	January 21–23, 2022	423 (RV)	–	–	6%	28%	4%	0%	1%	16%	0%	–	6%	1%	2%	11%	6% (Note: Liz Cheney at 2%; Greg Abbott, Chris Christie, Tom Cotton, and Glenn Youngkin at 1%.)	–
Harvard/Harris	January 19–20, 2022	1815 (RV)	–	–	14%	30%	4%	–	–	25%	3%	–	–	6%	3%	–	–	–
McLaughlin & Associates	January 13–18, 2022	468 (LV)	–	–	8%	26%	6%	–	0%	12%	1%	–	5%	1%	1%	18%	7% (Note: Candace Owens at 3%; Greg Abbot, Liz Cheney, Tom Cotton, and Kristi Noem at 1%.)	13%
Echelon Insights	December 9–13, 2021	439 (RV)	–	–	8%	30%	3%	1%	0%	12%	1%	–	4%	2%	1%	8%	8% (Note: Liz Cheney at 3%; Greg Abbott at 2%, Chris Christie and Kristi Noem at 1%.)	19%
Harvard/Harris	November 30 – December 2, 2021	1989 (RV)	–	–	13%	30%	7%	–	–	25%	4%	–	–	8%	4%	–	10%	–
Echelon Insights	November 12–18, 2021	435 (RV)	–	–	10%	26%	6%	1%	0%	15%	1%	–	3%	1%	1%	13%	5% (Note: Liz Cheney, Greg Abbott, Chris Christie, Glenn Youngkin, Rick Scott, and "Someone else" at 1%; Larry Hogan, Tom Cotton, Ben Sasse, and Kristi Noem at 0%.)	20%
Harvard/Harris	October 26–28, 2021	490 (LV)	±4.0%	–	12%	21%	–	–	–	23%	–	–	–	–	–	–	0%	43%
Echelon Insights	October 15–19, 2021	476 (RV)	–	2%	8%	22%	5%	0%	0%	8%	2%	–	3%	4%	2%	13%	8% (Note: Liz Cheney and Kristi Noem at 2%; "Someone else", Greg Abbott, Chris Christie and Tom Cotton at 1%; Josh Hawley, Larry Hogan, Ben Sasse and Rick Scott at 0%)	22%
McLaughlin & Associates	October 14–18, 2021	463 (LV)	–	–	5%	24%	5%	–	–	14%	1%	–	5%	2%	2%	18%	11% (Note: Candace Owens at 5%; Greg Abbott, Liz Cheney, John Kasich, Kristi Noem and Rick Scott at 2%; Tom Cotton at 1%)	13%
Echelon Insights Archived 2021-09-24 at the Wayback Machine	September 17–23, 2021	479 (RV)	–	2%	9%	22%	6%	1%	1%	15%	2%	–	4%	2%	1%	9%	11% (Note: "Someone else" at 3%; Liz Cheney, Chris Christie, Tom Cotton, Josh Hawley and Kristi Noem at 1%; Greg Abbott, Ben Sasse, Rick Scott and Marjorie Taylor Greene at 0%)	21%
Harvard/Harris	September 15–16, 2021	490 (LV)	±4.0%	–	14%	20%	–	–	–	32%	–	–	–	–	–	–	0%	38%
McLaughlin & Associates	September 9–14, 2021	456 (LV)	–	–	7%	22%	4%	–	–	15%	2%	–	4%	2%	2%	19%	12% (Note: Candace Owens at 5%; Liz Cheney and John Kasich at 2%; Tom Cotton, Kristi Noem and Rick Scott at 1%)	11%
Emerson College	August 30 – September 1, 2021	395 (RV)	± 4.9%	–	13%	32%	10%	6%	–	24%	–	–	6%	–	–	–	9% (Note: "Someone else" at 8%; Tom Cotton at 1%)	0%
McLaughlin & Associates	July 29 – August 3, 2021	467 (LV)	–	–	9%	23%	4%	–	–	11%	2%	–	4%	4%	1%	12%	16% (Note: Candace Owens at 6%; Ivanka Trump at 5%; Kristi Noem at 2%; Liz Cheney, Tom Cotton and John Kasich at 1%; Rick Scott at 0%)	14%
Echelon Insights Archived 2021-07-27 at the Wayback Machine	July 19–23, 2021	421 (RV)	–	1%	9%	32%	4%	1%	0%	17%	1%	–	3%	2%	1%	10%	6% (Note: "Someone else" at 1%; Greg Abbott, Liz Cheney, Tom Cotton, Josh Hawley and Kristi Noem at 1%; Chris Christie, Larry Hogan, Ben Sasse and Rick Scott at 0%)	13%
Fabrizio, Lee & Associates	July 6–8, 2021	800 (RV)	± 3.5%	–	7%	39%	4%	0%	1%	15%	1%	–	3%	–	2%	–	4% (Note: Kristi Noem at 2%; Tom Cotton and Rick Scott at 1%; Chris Christie at 0%)	24%
Echelon Insights Archived 2021-05-21 at the Wayback Machine	June 18–22, 2021	386 (RV)	–	1%	6%	21%	6%	0%	0%	14%	0%	–	4%	3%	2%	7%	7% (Note: "Someone else" at 2%; Greg Abbott, Liz Cheney, Chris Christie, Kristi Noem and Rick Scott at 1%; Tom Cotton, Josh Hawley and Ben Sasse at 0%)	26%
McLaughlin & Associates	June 16–20, 2021	444 (LV)	–	–	6%	24%	4%	–	–	19%	1%	–	5%	2%	1%	15%	13% (Note: Ivanka Trump at 4%; Candace Owens at 3%; Liz Cheney at 2%; Tom Cotton, John Kasich, Kristi Noem and Rick Scott at 1%)	11%
McLaughlin & Associates	May 12–18, 2021	444 (LV)	–	1%	12%	18%	5%	–	–	19%	2%	–	3%	1%	2%	13%	13% (Note: Candace Owens at 5%; Ivanka Trump at 3%; John Kasich at 2%; Liz Cheney, Tom Cotton, and Kristi Noem at 1%; Rick Scott at 0%)	12%
Echelon Insights Archived 2021-05-21 at the Wayback Machine	May 14–17, 2021	479 (RV)	–	2%	9%	22%	5%	1%	0%	14%	1%	–	4%	1%	3%	6%	9% (Note: Liz Cheney at 3%; Greg Abbott, Tom Cotton, Kristi Noem, Ben Sasse and "Someone else" at 1%; Chris Christie and Rick Scott at 0%; Dave Portnoy at no voters)	19%
Trafalgar Group	April 30 – May 6, 2021	– (LV) (Note: Republican subsample of total sample of 1574 likely voters)	–	–	15%	35%	6%	1%	–	10%	–	–	10%	–	–	–	21% (Note: "Someone else" at 19%; Kristi Noem and Ben Sasse at 1%)	–
Echelon Insights Archived 2021-06-01 at the Wayback Machine	April 16–23, 2021	440 (RV)	–	2%	8%	20%	6%	1%	0%	16%	1%	–	4%	2%	0%	9%	3% (Note: Kristi Noem and "Someone else" at 1%; Greg Abbott, Dave Portnoy and Rick Scott at 0%; Tom Cotton and Ben Sasse at no voters)	28%
McLaughlin & Associates	April 8–13, 2021	441 (LV)	–	3%	10%	14%	3%	–	–	19%	2%	–	3%	3%	1%	15%	13% (Note: Candace Owens at 4%; Ivanka Trump at 3%; Tom Cotton, John Kasich at 2%; Rick Scott and Kristi Noem at 1%)	14%
Echelon Insights	March 15–21, 2021	1,008 (RV)	–	4%	5%	17%	4%	–	–	16%	4%	–	3%	2%	–	3%	7% (Note: Greg Abbott at 2%; "Someone else," Tom Cotton, Tim Scott, Kristi Noem, Ben Sasse, Rick Scott, Josh Hawley, and Dave Portnoy at 1% or less)	35%
Fabrizio, Lee & Associates/The Hill	February 20 – March 2, 2021	1,264 (LV)	± 2.7%	–	13%	17%	8%	2%	1%	19%	4%	–	5%	4%	1%	–	7% (Note: Kristi Noem at 4%; Chris Christie, Tom Cotton and Rick Scott at 1%)	20%
McLaughlin & Associates	Feb 24–28, 2021	448 (LV)	–	1%	9%	9%	5%	–	–	15%	–	–	6%	2%	–	21%	16% (Note: Candace Owens at 4%; Ivanka Trump at 3%; Tom Cotton, John Kasich, Kristi Noem, and Tim Scott at 2%; Rick Scott at 1%)	17%
RMG Research/Just the News	February 25–27, 2021	363 (RV)	–	8%	18%	21%	10%	2%	–	–	9%	–	–	–	–	–	33% (Note: "Other" at 21%; Tom Cotton and Kristi Noem at 4%; Greg Abbott and Devin Nunes at 2%)	–
Harvard/Harris	February 23–25, 2021	546 (RV)	–	–	16%	–	10%	6%	–	41%	–	–	–	–	7%	–	19% (Note: "Someone else" at 16%; Tom Cotton at 3%)	–
Echelon Insights	February 12–18, 2021	430 (RV)	–	1%	10%	8%	6%	≤1%	1%	21%	1%	–	4%	≤1%	≤1%	8%	12% (Note: Dan Crenshaw, Kristi Noem, Ben Sasse and "Someone else" at 2%; Tom Cotton, John Kasich, Rand Paul at 1%; Greg Abbott, Dave Portnoy, and Elise Stefanik at 1% or less)	26%
Echelon Insights	January 20–26, 2021	– (RV) (Note: GOP and GOP-leaning subsample of a full sample of 1,006 registered voters)	–	2%	8%	2%	9%	0%	0%	21%	1%	–	3%	2%	1%	10%	10% (Note: Rand Paul at 3%; John Kasich and "Someone else" at 2%; Dan Crenshaw and Tom Cotton at 1%; Greg Abbott, Larry Hogan, Ben Sasse and Elise Stefanik at 0%)	30%
	January 20, 2021	Inauguration of Joe Biden																
Léger	January 15–17, 2021	1,007 (A) (Note: Among all adults (no Republican crosstab published). The same pollster showed 25% for Trump and 19% for Romney in November, when taking into account all voters and not only Republicans.)	± 3.09%	–	9%	3%	8%	2%	7%	22%	3%	–	20%	4%	3%	11%	8% (Note: Ben Sasse and Ivanka Trump at 3%; Rick Scott at 2%)	–
McLaughlin & Associates/Newsmax	November 21–23, 2020	442 (LV)	± 3.1%	1%	7%	2%	6%	–	–	20%	1%	–	5%	3%	2%	20%	13% (Note: Ivanka Trump at 4%; John Kasich at 3%; Tom Cotton, Kristi Noem at 2%; Rick Scott at 0%)	22%
Léger	November 13–15, 2020	304 (A) (Note: Among 304 republican adults as opposed to all adults)	± 3.1%	6%	14%	–	6%	–	–	44%	3%	–	11%	6%	–	–	7% (Note: Rick Santorum at 3%; John Kasich and Rick Scott at 2%)	–
	November 3, 2020	2020 presidential election																
McLaughlin & Associates	November 2–3, 2020	449 (LV)	–	2%	5%	2%	8%	–	–	30%	–	–	5%	2%	1%	20%	5% (Note: John Kasich at 2%; Tom Cotton, Kristi Noem and Rick Scott at 1%)	21%
Echelon Insights	August 14–18, 2020	423 (LV)	–	2%	4%	–	7%	0%	1%	26%	–	–	–	5%	1%	12%	11% (Note: "Someone else" at 3%; Tom Cotton, Dan Crenshaw, Lindsey Graham and John Kasich at 2%; Ben Sasse and Elise Stefanik at 0%)	29%
Léger	August 4–7, 2020	309 (LV)	± 2.8%	7%	8%	–	11%	–	–	31%	3%	–	9%	5%	–	17%	9% (Note: Paul Ryan at 4%; Ivanka Trump at 3%; Kevin McCarthy at 2%)	–

== See also ==
- Statewide opinion polling for the 2024 Republican Party presidential primaries
- 2024 Republican National Convention
- Nationwide opinion polling for the 2024 Democratic Party presidential primaries
- Nationwide opinion polling for the 2024 United States presidential election

== Notes ==
Partisan clients
