= The Messenger (website) =

American news website (2023–2024)

- Website type: News website
- Available in: English
- Founded: May 15, 2023
- Dissolved: January 31, 2024; 2 years ago
- Headquarters: West Palm Beach, Florida, U.S.
- Owner: JAF Communications Inc.
- Founder: Jimmy Finkelstein
- President: Richard Beckman
- CEO: Jimmy Finkelstein
- Website: The Messenger at the Wayback Machine (archived 2024-01-30)
- Commercial: Yes
- Launched: May 15, 2023; 3 years ago
- Current status: defunct

The Messenger was an American news website founded by Jimmy Finkelstein, the former owner of Washington, D.C.-based news organization The Hill. The publication launched on May 15, 2023, and hired many journalists and editors from several other established news organizations. On January 31, 2024, Finkelstein informed employees that The Messenger was shutting down effective immediately, citing funding issues. The New York Times called it "one of the biggest busts" in online news.

== History ==
The Messenger was founded by Finkelstein, after selling The Hill to Nexstar Media Group in 2021. Finkelstein began to raise funds for The Messenger, which he founded in West Palm Beach, Florida. The website secured an investment of $50 million from American businessmen Mark Penn, Victor Ganzi, Josh Harris, James Tisch, and Thomas Peterffy and acquired the assets of Grid News prior to its launch on May 15, 2023. Richard Beckman, former president of The Hill and Condé Nast, had the same role with The Messenger.

On January 2, 2024, The New York Times reported that The Messenger would be laying off two dozen employees due to financial difficulties. Beckman announced he would be leaving the company due to health issues. Semafor reported the next day that the company's board was considering shutting it down after learning that the company would run out of money by the end of the month. The company said that it had begun to secure further investments. CNBC reported the site scaled back its employee cuts and planned on launching a vertical called Messenger TV, even with its liquidity and cash flow problems, and estimated a surge in revenue for the year.

On January 31, Axios and The New York Times reported that the funding attempt had failed, and the organization would be shutting down. The day after its shut down, The Messenger was sued in a class action lawsuit by its former employees, who had not been offered severance.

== Content ==
The website's approach to publication of news content was to publish large quantities of content, having rapidly hired large numbers of journalists at above-market wages and acquiring Grid News in order to facilitate broad coverage of the news. According to former staffers, the website often functioned similarly to a content farm, with reporters aggregating stories from other news sources and social media.

In June 2023, The Messenger published a story about a Nevada family supposedly being visited by aliens. As the website developed, it started producing more original content, including stories on the New York City Police Department conducting a wellness check on a fundraiser for Mayor Eric Adams and on Taylor Swift and Travis Kelce "quietly hanging out" in July.

In September, The Messenger published a story based on a post from Libs of TikTok, a right-wing Twitter account.

== Editorial stance ==
In December 2023, Semafor reported that Finkelstein had ordered coverage of Donald Trump's civil fraud trial in November to be taken off the home page, which sparked a backlash from some editors. In an email to a group of editors, Finkelstein said his instructions for the placement of stories about Trump had been misunderstood and that more balance was needed on the home page.

== Staffing ==
At the time of The Messenger's launch, editorial and managerial staff included senior staff from several other news organizations. Dan Wakeford, the former editor-in-chief of People, worked in the same role at The Messenger, while former Politico politics editor Marty Kady was the website's politics editor. The sports section was led by former editorial director of The Athletic Dan Kauffman, while former Gizmodo editor-in-chief David M. Ewalt was the website's technology and science editor. The Messenger's health vertical was edited by Amy Eisinger, the former editor-in-chief of Self, and the website's entertainment vertical was led by former Entertainment Weekly editor-in-chief Mary Margaret.

The Messenger employed about 150 journalists at the time of its launch, with the website claiming it would employ around 550 by the end of its first year in operation. The site hired about 300 people during its eight months in operation.

== Business model ==
The site's business model was dependent primarily on revenue from advertisers, as the website was free-to-access and was not paywalled, though the site aimed to bring in revenue through the sale of subscription-only newsletters and sponsored events.

The company's growth strategy was considered aggressive, with its stated goals being to expand its employment rolls to 750 (including 550 newsroom employees) and to attain profitability by earning $100 million in annual revenue by 2024, seeking to achieve 100 million unique monthly visitors by that time. The Messenger had more than 100,000 unique daily visitors four days after its launch.

The site's revenue model generated only $3 million by near the end of 2023, as the company hemorrhaged cash while it contemplated ambitious expansion into products such as Messenger TV. At the time of the site's closure, The New York Times characterized The Messenger as "one of the biggest busts in the annals of online news".
