= Dan Wakeford =

English-born American journalist and former editor-in-chief of the Messenger

Dan Wakeford (born March 3, 1975) is an English-born American Journalist. He is the former editor-in-chief of The Messenger, People magazine and editorial director of Entertainment Weekly from 2019 to 2022. Prior, he was editor-in-chief of In Touch Weekly and Life & Style Weekly.

== Early life and education ==
Wakeford grew up in a small village in Hampshire, UK with his twin brother and younger brother. He graduated from Leicester University in 1996 with a B.A. in American Studies.

== News career ==
Wakeford started his career in journalism working at News UK and then onto become news editor of Heat magazine. In 2002 he moved to America where he worked at In Touch Weekly and Life & Style Weekly eventually becoming the editor-in-chief of both titles.

In 2013, Wakeford was called upon to defend his magazine company in court after Tom Cruise accused the owners of the company of racism.

In 2015, Wakeford became a deputy editor at People magazine. In 2019, he was promoted to editor-in-chief. At People Wakeford created and executive produced the crime documentary series People Magazine Investigates on ID and Discovery+ and two prime time four-hour documentaries on the royals for ABC: The Story of Diana and The Story of The Royals. Wakeford regularly appeared on camera for People Magazine Investigates and many other television shows including Dateline, the Today Show, GMA, the Kelly Clarkson Show, the Drew Barrymore Show and CNN.

During his tenure at People he pushed the brand into podcasts, video and new social platforms and grew the digital footprint to 76 million unique visitors and the whole brand footprint to 88 million consumers a month.

Wakeford broke exclusive news stories during his time at People, including interviews with Linda Evangelista about her cosmetic procedure lawsuit, Vanessa Bryant in her only interview after death of her husband Kobe and daughter Gigi, and the world exclusive first look at Friends: The Reunion. He oversaw interviews with notable figures, including Prince William on his Earthshot initiative, President Joe Biden and First Lady Jill Biden's first interview post-inauguration and George Clooney on his humanitarian work.

During his time at People magazine, Wakeford launched programs to encourage COVID vaccinations, and celebrate Companies That Care. He instituted the brand's first-ever issue on LGBTQ+ Pride. Under his stewardship, People magazine won the 2021 Folio Eddie and Ozzie Award for the best Consumer, Lifestyle magazine issue, the 2021 GLAADD Award for Outstanding Magazine Overall Coverage, and Adweek's 2020 Hot List, celebrating the best in TV, Publishing, Digital and Brands, and the Didi Hirsch Mental Health Services 2020 Erasing The Stigma Award for the mental health initiative Let’s Talk About It.

He was editor-in-chief of The Messenger, which opened in May 2023 and folded in January 2024.

== Personal life ==
In May 2018, Wakeford married Canadian actor and pastry chef Lucas Baker.. The happy couple now reside in Bellport, NY with their two cats, Mikey and Gus, and their black and white French Bulldog, Misty Moo.
