= Fashion Rocks =

Annual fashion industry event

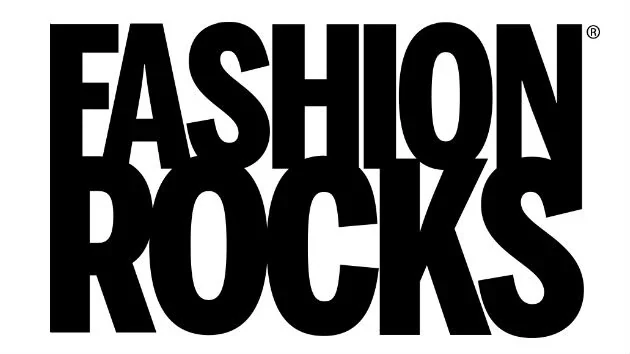
- Status: Inactive
- Genre: Funraiser Event
- Country: United States
- Inaugurated: 2003
- Most recent: 2014

Fashion Rocks was an annual international charity fundraiser event, which featured fashions by the world's top designers presented as live performances by popular music acts.

Fashion Rocks Worldwide is the owner of the intellectual property rights to the Fashion Rocks brand and grants licenses for these live events globally.

== History ==
=== 2003 to 2006 ===
The inaugural Fashion Rocks event was held at the Royal Albert Hall on October 15, 2003. Seventeen designers presented that night, including Donatella Versace and Alexander McQueen, with Björk, Jane's Addiction, Beyoncé, Robbie Williams, Grace Jones, Milla Jovovich, Blue and Duran Duran being among the performers. Proceeds went to The Prince's Trust, which totalled £1-million. The show was devised by Nicholas Coleridge, Chair of the British Fashion Council and President of Conde Nast International.

In 2004, Conde Nast held the first American Fashion Rocks event in New York, with Avril Lavigne performing along with John Rzeznik the mega-hit "Iris" by the Goo Goo Dolls. Other performers included Alicia Keys, Beyoncé, Usher with Dave Navarro, and the Pussycat Dolls along Marc Almond.

The second European event for the Prince's Trust was held on October 17, 2005, at the Grimaldi Forum in Monte Carlo and was sponsored by Swarovski. Hosted by Jerry Hall, a dozen designers presented that night, including Alexander McQueen, Calvin Klein, Dolce & Gabbana, Giorgio Armani, Prada, Roberto Cavalli, Versace and Vivienne Westwood. Musical guests included Blondie, Craig David, Amerie, Mariah Carey, David Bowie, Bon Jovi, Jamie Cullum and Róisín Murphy.

That same year, Condé Nast held an event on September 8 at Radio City Music Hall which kicked off New York Fashion Week. Among the performers that night were David Bowie, Gwen Stefani, Duran Duran, Alicia Keys, Tim McGraw, Shakira, Nelly, Billy Idol, Arcade Fire and Destiny's Child (in their last televised appearance as a group). Proceeds from the night went to Hurricane Katrina relief efforts

In 2006, Elton John hosted the event, with proceeds to go to the Elton John AIDS Foundation. Among the performers were Beyoncé, Jay-Z, Christina Aguilera, The Black Eyed Peas, Pussycat Dolls, Jibbs, and Nelly Furtado.

=== 2007 to 2009 ===
The 2007 Conde Nast event hosted by Jeremy Piven featured performances from artists such as Aerosmith, Avril Lavigne, Mary J. Blige, Usher, Jennifer Hudson, Santana, Alicia Keys, Carrie Underwood, Lily Allen, Sugababes, Maroon 5, Róisín Murphy and Jennifer Lopez.

The 2008 event was hosted by Denis Leary and featured Ciara, Rihanna, Justin Timberlake, Miley Cyrus, Beyoncé, Mariah Carey, Natasha Bedingfield, Fergie, Kid Rock & Lynyrd Skynyrd (performed together), Keith Urban, Duffy, the Pussycat Dolls and The Black Eyed Peas. Proceeds went to Stand Up To Cancer.

In 2009, the first ever Latin American event took place in Rio de Janeiro, in Brazil, presenting designers such as Riccardo Tisci, Lenny Niemeyer, Calvin Klein, Lino Villaventura, André Lima, Marc Jacobs, Alexandre Herchcovitch and Donatella Versace. The event was hosted by model Fernanda Lima and rapper Diddy. Musical guests performing at the event included Mariah Carey, Wanessa, Ja Rule, Diddy-Dirty Money, Daniela Mercury, Grace Jones, Estelle, Ciara and Stop Play Moon.

=== 2010 to 2014 ===
Three Lions Entertainment and CEO Richard Beckman engineered the return of Fashion Rocks, The new music-inspired social fashion shopping site, www.fashionrocks.com was launched in August 2014.

A new event took place in 2014, hosted in Brooklyn by Ryan Seacrest. Musical guests included Nicki Minaj, Afrojack, Duran Duran, Jennifer Lopez, Kiss, Miranda Lambert, Nico & Vinz, Pitbull, Rita Ora, The Band Perry, Enrique Iglesias and Usher. The event has been inactive since 2014.
