= Grid News =

American media company

- Website type: News
- Owner: The Messenger
- Editor: Laura McGann
- Key people: Mark Bauman
- Website: https://www.grid.news

Grid News, also known as Grid, was a digital media company based in Washington, D.C. It launched in January 2022. Grid News was initially led by Mark Bauman as a senior advisor and Laura McGann as its executive editor. It produced a podcast called "Bad Takes" hosted by Grid editors Matthew Yglesias and McGann. The conversational podcast covered one "bad take," or incorrect opinion, each week.

Grid's corporate entity was Media Investment Properties OpCo LLC, a Delaware domestic limited liability company.

On March 22, 2023, Grid, its brand, and its assets were purchased for an undisclosed price by The Messenger, a news startup led by Jimmy Finkelstein, former owner of The Hill. On March 27, 2023, Grid's website was shuttered and redirected to The Messenger's website.

== Overview ==
Grid News employs a format it calls a "360," which breaks down potentially complex stories by approaching them from various lenses, such as race, climate change and misinformation. Stories are often written collaboratively by different writers who focus on different contexts for the story. This is intended to illustrate how stories intersect with larger topics, like the economy or health care. In addition to the news site, Grid's reporting and storytelling are also featured in its daily newsletter, which debuted alongside Grid's launch. In September 2022, the publication launched a weekly healthcare newsletter called Grid Health.

== History ==
In February 2022, Grid conducted an investigation into the 2022 Canada convoy protests. The coverage led the U.S. Oversight Committee to prompt Meta CEO Mark Zuckerberg to intervene in the crisis.

In October 2022, Adweek selected McGann as its "Editor of the Year."

On November 7, 2022, Bauman stepped down from his president and chief executive officer roles and became an advisor to the company. He revealed the news to staff in a note.

On June 20, 2023, Digiday named Grid the Editorial Team of the Year in their annual Digital Awards.

== Commercial Strategy ==
Grid's business was built on engagement with its over 2 million monthly readers, including "a bipartisan, senior-level audience of policymakers and political influencers, including many in Congress, the White House and nearly all Federal agencies."

The majority of Grid's revenue came from digital advertising on its website, newsletter sponsorships, podcast ads, and brand content. Advertisers included Meta, GE, Amazon, Delta Air Lines, Business Roundtable, and PhRMA.

== Funding ==
Initial funding of $10 million for Grid News was provided by International Media Investments and technology executive Brian Edelman. International Media Investments, which is based in Abu Dhabi, is a subsidiary of the Abu Dhabi Media Investment Corporation, which is privately owned by UAE Deputy Prime Minister Mansour bin Zayed Al Nahyan and also has a minority stake in Euronews.

== Team ==
Grid used public relations firm APCO Worldwide to perform "consulting services" in connection with its launch. APCO participated in a pitch for the full-time public relations work, but lost the bid to firm DKC News. As of March 2023, APCO had no ongoing relationship with Grid. APCO Worldwide senior advisor and former CNN journalist John Defterios also sits on Grid's board. Other board members included journalists David Ensor, Madulika Sikka and Chris Isham, and diplomat Alberto Fernandez.

The Grid launch team included Kay Steiger, a former Vox Media Washington editor and Tom Nagorski, a former ABC News managing editor. In August 2022, Leah Askarinam, a former politics reporter at the New York Times, joined the team as a senior editor.

Immediately before becoming communications director for Vice President Kamala Harris, Jamal Simmons was paid $60,000 in "consulting fees" by Grid's corporate entity for work between August 2021 and January 2022 to launch a "reoccurring online interview segment."
