= Richard Beckman =

British media and entertainment executive

Richard D. Beckman is a British media and entertainment sales executive.

== Personal life ==
Richard D. Beckman was born in London, England, and received a bachelor's degree from The University of Manchester, England, in 1981.

== Charity Boards ==
He has served on the boards of Laureus Foundation and Comedy Hall of Fame. He also has been involved in fundraising for City of Hope, March of Dimes, Keep a Child Alive and the American Cancer Society.

== Career ==
=== Early career ===
Beckman was an Account Executive at the International Thomson Organization in the United Kingdom in 1981 to 1982. He then became Sales Development Executive at Thames Television, a British ITV television network serving London and the surrounding area.

He moved to New York, where Beckman was Field Sales Executive for Reuben H. Donnelly, a provider of Yellow Pages in United States.

== Condé Nast ==
From 1986 to 2010, Beckman served in various executive positions at Condé Nast over a 24-year career including chief executive officer of Fairchild Fashion Media, President of the Condé Nast Media Group and the chief marketing officer of Condé Nast. He was also the Publisher of Condé Nast Traveler, Gentleman's Quarterly and Vogue. He created GQ's Men of The Year, The Vogue/VH1 Fashion Awards and the Movies Rock which was broadcast on NBC, VH1, and CBS respectively.

=== New Yorker Magazine ===
From 1986 to 1992, Beckman was advertising manager at the New Yorker.

=== Condé Nast Traveler ===
In 1992, Beckman became publisher, where he launched the Hot List, the Environmental Awards and expanded The Reader's Choice Awards. Condé Nast Traveler was renamed to Adweek's "Hot List" in 1996.

=== Gentleman's Quarterly Magazine ===
In 1996, he managed GQ, Beckman created and produced GQ's Men of the Year.

=== Vogue Magazine ===
Beckman became president of Vogue Magazine in 1998. There he launched Teen Vogue and Men's Vogue and co-produced the Vogue/VH1 Fashion Awards in 2000–2001. In 2001, Beckman along with Rod Stewart won the City of Hope award.

In 1999, following an ad sales meeting, Beckman attempted to get two of his female employees—an advertising director and a fashion director—to kiss by banging their heads together, causing one of the women to suffer a broken nose. Condé Nast paid a seven-figure settlement to the injured woman, and Beckman was forced to apologize to the Vogue staff and undergo counseling.

=== Conde Nast Media Group ===
From 2002 to 2009, Beckman oversaw Condé Nast Media Group. He developed network television shows including Fashion Rocks on CBS (2004–2008) and Movies Rock on CBS (2007).

=== Conde Nast Publications/Fairchild Fashion Group ===
He was the CEO of the Fairchild Fashion Group, made up of several assets acquired from Capital Cities/Disney for $630mm and included: WWD, Footwear News, W Magazine, Beauty Biz, Fairchild Trade Shows, Summits and Fairchild Books.

== Prometheus Global Media ==
In 2010, Beckman was the founding CEO of Prometheus Global Media. There he changed The Hollywood Reporter from a daily print publication be platform agnostic, covering the entertainment industry, re-positioned Billboard, and executive produced The Billboard Music Awards in May 2011/2012, after a 5 years hiatus.

Also at Prometheus Global Media, he led the consolidation of Adweek, Mediaweek and Brandweek and expanded the Clio Awards by bringing the show back to network television (NBC).

== Three Lions Entertainment ==
Beckman was CEO and founder of Three Lions Entertainment, launched by Richard Beckman, Joel Katz, Chairman of Entertainment for Greenberg Traurig, and Ron Burkle in 2013. He engineered the return of Fashion Rocks, aa special on CBS, with corporate partnerships. The show was hosted by Ryan Seacrest and featured performances from artists including Usher, Jennifer Lopez, Nicki Minaj, Luke Bryan, Miranda Lambert, Pitbull, Duran Duran, Kiss and Enrique Inglesias. It was broadcast live 9 September from the Barclay Center, Brooklyn airing in over 100 countries globally. Beckman also created the revival of the television specials Movies Rock and Sports Rock.

== VICE Media ==
At Vice Media, Beckman served as Chief Revenue Officer where he oversaw all advertising, sponsorship and brand relationships across all VICE channels, including the launch of VICELAND TV Channel in February 2016. His tenure was less than 1 year.
