= 2024 Connecticut Republican presidential primary =

- April 2, 2024

28 Republican National Convention delegates

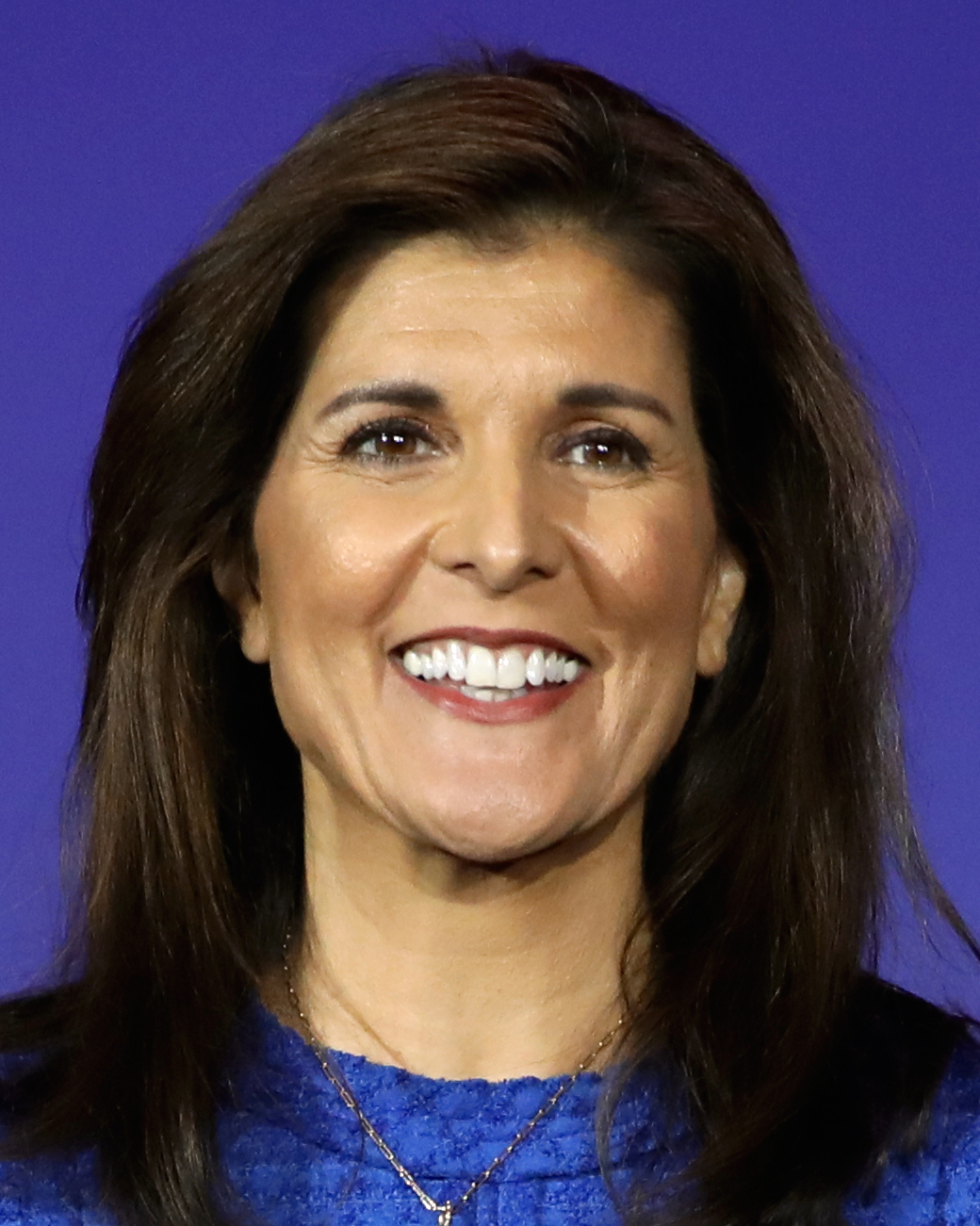
Candidate	Donald Trump	Nikki Haley (withdrawn)
Home state	Florida	South Carolina
Delegate count	28	0
Popular vote	34,750	6,229
Percentage	77.88%	13.96%

Trump
50–60%
60–70%
70–80%
80–90%
>90%

The 2024 Connecticut Republican presidential primary was held on April 2, 2024, as part of the Republican Party primaries for the 2024 presidential election. 28 delegates to the 2024 Republican National Convention were allocated on a winner-take-most basis. The contest was held alongside primaries in New York, Rhode Island, and Wisconsin.

== Candidates ==
Connecticut Secretary of the State Stephanie Thomas announced the following list of qualifying candidates on January 19, 2024:

- Donald Trump
- Ryan Binkley (withdrew February 27, 2024)
- Ron DeSantis (withdrew January 21, 2024)
- Nikki Haley (withdrew March 6, 2024)
- Uncommitted

== Results ==
Connecticut Republican primary, April 2, 2024
Candidate	Votes	Percentage	Actual delegate count		
Candidate	Votes	Percentage	Bound	Unbound	Total
Donald Trump	34,750	77.88%	28	0	28
Nikki Haley (withdrawn)	6,229	13.96%	0	0	0
Uncommitted	2,166	4.85%	0	0	0
Ron DeSantis (withdrawn)	1,289	2.89%	0	0	0
Ryan Binkley (withdrawn)	184	0.41%	0	0	0
Total:	44,618	100.00%	28	0	28

== See also ==
- 2024 Connecticut Democratic presidential primary
- 2024 Republican Party presidential primaries
- 2024 United States presidential election
- 2024 United States presidential election in Connecticut
- 2024 United States elections
