= 2024 Maine Republican presidential primary =

- March 5, 2024

20 Republican National Convention delegates

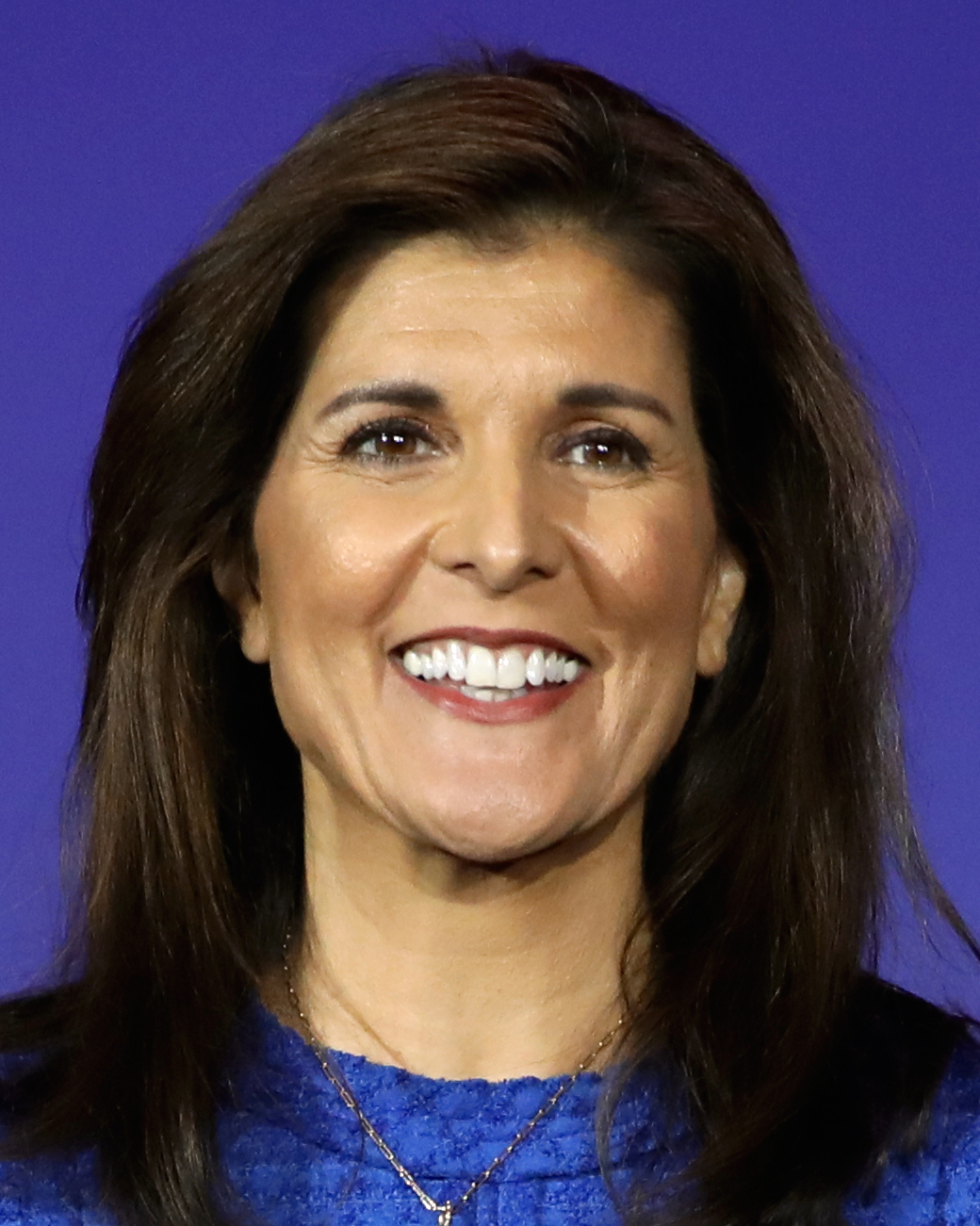
Candidate	Donald Trump	Nikki Haley
Home state	Florida	South Carolina
Delegate count	20	0
Popular vote	79,034	27,912
Percentage	71.92%	25.40%

Trump
40 – 50%
50 – 60%
60 – 70%
70 – 80%
80 – 90%
>90%
Haley
50 – 60%
60 – 70%
>90%
Tie/No votes
40 – 50%
No votes

The 2024 Maine Republican presidential primary was held on March 5, 2024, as part of the Republican Party primaries for the 2024 presidential election. 20 delegates to the 2024 Republican National Convention were allocated on a winner-take-most basis. The contest was held on Super Tuesday alongside primaries in 14 other states. This was a semi-closed primary where party members may only vote in their respective party's primary, but unenrolled voters may choose a party's primary to participate in. This change in law from Maine's previous closed primary went into effect on May 14, 2022, without Gov. Janet Mills' signature.

On December 28, 2023, Maine Secretary of State Shenna Bellows declared that Donald Trump is ineligible to appear on the state's primary ballot under the Fourteenth Amendment due to his role in the January 6 United States Capitol attack. Following the Supreme Courts unanimous decision in Trump v. Anderson that Trump should remain on the ballot, Bellows withdrew the ban.

== Electoral system ==
As with all statewide elections in Maine since 2016, the primary will take place using ranked-choice voting. However, the Maine Republican Party, which is opposed to ranked-choice voting, has stated that it will disregard the final results if there is an automatic runoff, only recognizing the first round results. If a candidate gets over 50% in the first round, there will be no automatic runoff, but if no candidate gets over 50%, then the last place candidate will be eliminated and their votes distributed to whoever their voters marked as their second choice, and so on, until a candidate reaches over 50%. This could lead to the state recognizing one winner based on the ranked-choice results and the Republican Party recognizing a different one based on whoever won the plurality of votes in the first round.

== Chris Christie qualification controversy ==
Former Governor of New Jersey Chris Christie failed to make the Maine primary ballot, as he did not submit the required 2,000 signatures to the Secretary of State by the November 20 deadline. Christie attempted to appeal the decision, but the Maine Superior Court upheld the secretary's ruling.

== Attempted disqualification of Trump ==
On December 15, 2023, two challenges to Trump's eligibility as a candidate for the primary election via Section 3 of the 14th Amendment were presented to the Maine Secretary of State, Shenna Bellows.

On December 28, 2023, Bellows announced Trump's ineligibility in a 34-page ruling, arguing that he "used a false narrative of election fraud to inflame his supporters." However, removal from the ballot has been stayed to permit time to appeal. On January 2, 2024, Trump appealed the ruling to the Maine Superior Court, arguing that Bellows is biased and that she has "no legal authority to consider the federal constitutional issues presented by the challengers". Maine Superior Court Justice Michaela Murphy did not make a decision on January 17 and instructed Bellows to let the United States Supreme Court first decide its ruling in Trump v. Anderson and to issue a new ruling within 30 days once the Supreme Court ruling is given. Trump remains on the ballot in the meanwhile. Bellows appealed to the Maine Supreme Judicial Court on January 19. The Supreme Court ruled on March 4 in favor of keeping Trump on the ballot; Bellows withdrew the ban shortly afterwards.

== Candidates ==
=== Official candidates on the ballot ===
The following candidates were announced by the Maine Department of the Secretary of State on December 1.

- Ryan Binkley (withdrawn on February 27, 2024)
- Nikki Haley
- Donald Trump
- Doug Burgum (withdrawn on December 4, 2023)
- Vivek Ramaswamy (withdrawn on January 15, 2024)
- Ron DeSantis (withdrawn on January 21, 2024)

=== Failed to make ballot ===
- Chris Christie
- Asa Hutchinson

== Endorsements ==
Ron DeSantis

State Senator

- Brad Farrin, 3rd district (2018–present)
Nikki Haley

U.S. Senator

- Susan Collins, (1997–present)
Donald Trump

State Representative

- Mike Soboleski, Member of the Maine House of Representatives from the 73rd district (2022–present)

== Polling ==
Poll source	Date(s) administered	Sample size (Note: Key: A – all adults RV – registered voters LV – likely voters V – unclear)	Margin of error	Liz Cheney	Ron DeSantis	Nikki Haley	Mike Pence	Mike Pompeo	Vivek Ramaswamy	Chris Sununu	Donald Trump
Digital Research Inc.	Mar 22 – April 22, 2023	192 (LV)	–	10%	27%	3%	5%	1%	1%	1%	59%

Hypothetical polling

Maine's 2nd congressional district

Poll source	Date(s) administered	Sample size	Margin of error	Nikki Haley	Mike Pence	Other	Undecided
	January 3, 2023	Redrawing of congressional districts after the 2020 redistricting cycle					
	January 20, 2021	Inauguration of Joe Biden					
	November 3, 2020	2020 presidential election					
SurveyUSA	Jun 30 – July 6, 2020	604 (LV)	± 4.1%	12%	30%	36% (Note: Ted Cruz with 12%; Donald Trump Jr. with 11%; Ivanka Trump with 7%; Marco Rubio with 6%)	21%

== Results ==
Maine Republican primary, March 5, 2024
Candidate	Votes	Percentage	Actual delegate count		
Candidate	Votes	Percentage	Bound	Unbound	Total
Donald Trump	79,034	71.92%	20	0	20
Nikki Haley	27,912	25.40%	0	0	0
Ron DeSantis (withdrawn)	1,191	1.08%	0	0	0
Vivek Ramaswamy (withdrawn)	440	0.40%	0	0	0
Ryan Binkley (withdrawn)	299	0.27%	0	0	0
Blank ballots	1,022	0.93%	0	0	0
Total:	109,898	100.00%	20	0	20

== See also ==
- 2024 Maine Democratic presidential primary
- 2024 Republican Party presidential primaries
- 2024 United States presidential election
- 2024 United States presidential election in Maine
- 2024 United States elections
