= 2024 New Mexico Republican presidential primary =

- June 4, 2024

22 Republican National Convention delegates

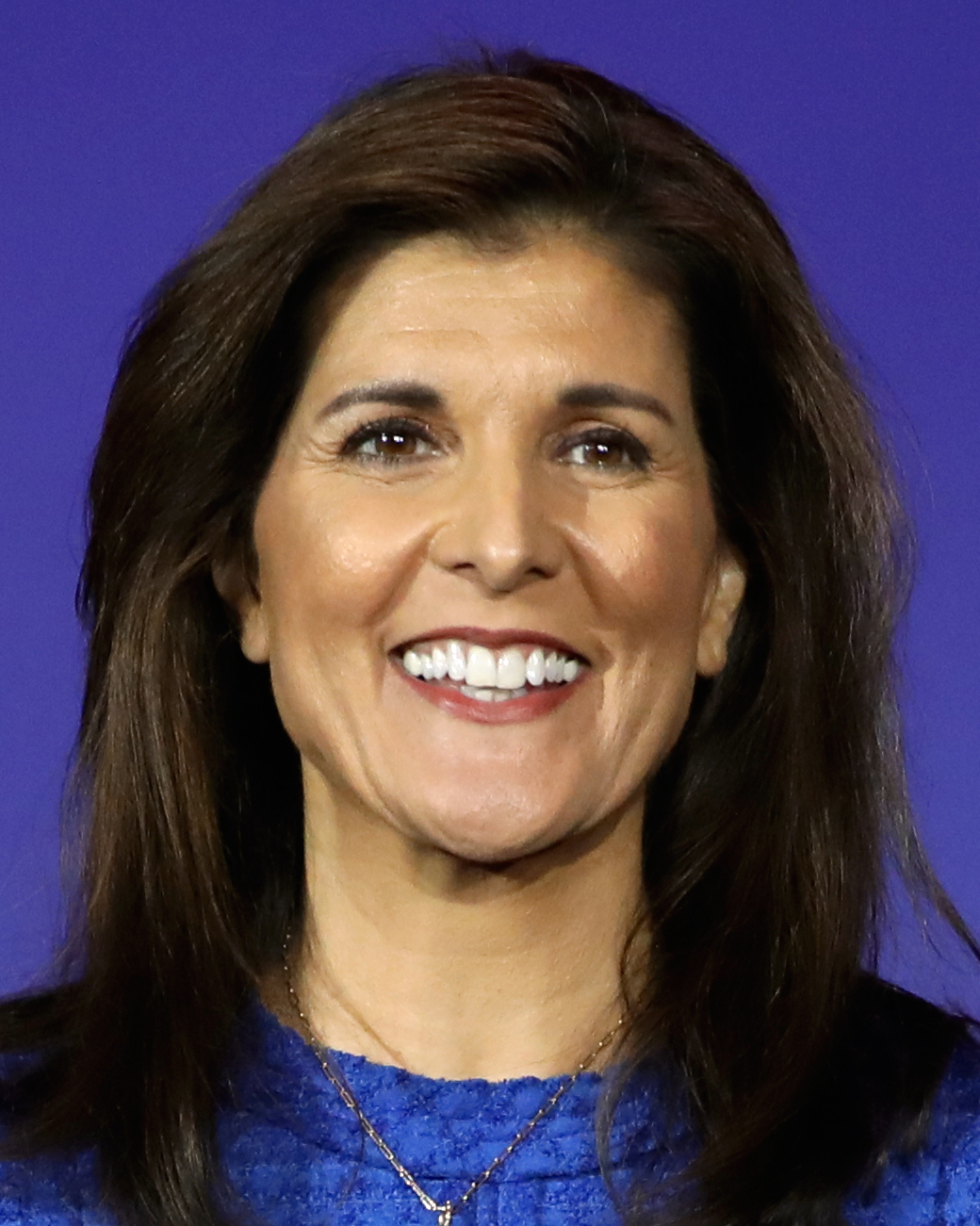
Candidate	Donald Trump	Nikki Haley (withdrawn)
Home state	Florida	South Carolina
Delegate count	22	0
Popular vote	78,999	8,054
Percentage	84.5%	8.6%
County results
Trump
60–70%
70–80%
80–90%
>90%

The 2024 New Mexico Republican presidential primary was held on June 4, 2024, as part of the Republican Party primaries for the 2024 presidential election. 22 delegates to the 2024 Republican National Convention were allocated on a proportional basis. The contest was among the last in the Republican primary cycle, held the same day as primaries in Montana, New Jersey, and South Dakota.

== Candidates ==
The following candidates were certified by the state GOP:

- Chris Christie (withdrawn)
- Ron DeSantis (withdrawn)
- Nikki Haley (withdrawn)
- Vivek Ramaswamy (withdrawn)
- Donald Trump
- Uncommitted

== Endorsements ==
Ron DeSantis (withdrawn)

Federal executive officials

- John Anderson, U.S. Attorney for the District of New Mexico (2018–2021)
Donald Trump

Notable individuals

- Solomon Peña, former car salesman

== Results ==
New Mexico Republican primary, June 4, 2024
Candidate	Votes	Percentage	Actual delegate count		
Candidate	Votes	Percentage	Bound	Unbound	Total
Donald Trump	78,999	84.5%	22	0	22
Nikki Haley (withdrawn)	8,054	8.6%	0	0	0
Uncommitted	3,130	3.3%	0	0	0
Chris Christie (withdrawn)	2,428	2.6%	0	0	0
Vivek Ramaswamy (withdrawn)	886	0.9%	0	0	0
Total:	93,497	100.00%	22	0	22

== See also ==
- 2024 New Mexico Democratic presidential primary
- 2024 Republican Party presidential primaries
- 2024 United States presidential election
- 2024 United States presidential election in New Mexico
- 2024 United States elections
