= 2024 Montana Republican presidential primary =

- June 4, 2024

31 Republican National Convention delegates

Candidate	Donald Trump	No preference
Home state	Florida	—
Delegate count	31	0
Popular vote	165,678	16,570
Percentage	90.9%	9.1%
Trump
80–90%
>90%

The 2024 Montana Republican presidential primary was held on June 4, 2024, as part of the Republican Party primaries for the 2024 presidential election. 31 delegates to the 2024 Republican National Convention were allocated on a winner-take-all basis. The contest was among the last in the Republican primary cycle, held alongside primaries in New Jersey, New Mexico, and South Dakota.

== Candidates ==
Only one candidate filed for the primary election ballot:

- Donald Trump
- No preference

Additionally, voters had an option to vote for "No preference."

== Endorsements ==
Donald Trump

U.S. Senators

- Steve Daines, (2015–present)

U.S. Representatives

- Matt Rosendale, MT-02 (2023–present) and MT-AL (2021–2023)
- Ryan Zinke, MT-01 (2023–present) and MT-AL (2015–2017) and U.S. Secretary of the Interior (2017–2019)

State Executive officials

- Elsie Arntzen, Superintendent of Public Instruction of Montana (2017–present)

Notable individuals

- Tim Sheehy, CEO of Bridger Aerospace and Republican candidate for U.S. Senator in 2024
Ron DeSantis (withdrawn)

State representative

- Daniel Zolnikov, District 22

== Results ==
Montana Republican primary, June 4, 2024
Candidate	Votes	Percentage	Actual delegate count		
Candidate	Votes	Percentage	Bound	Unbound	Total
Donald Trump	165,678	90.9%	31	0	31
No Preference	16,570	9.1%	0	0	0
Total:	182,248	100.00%	31	0	31

== Polling ==
Poll source	Date(s) administered	Sample size (Note: Key: A – all adults RV – registered voters LV – likely voters V – unclear)	Margin of error	Chris Christie	Ron DeSantis	Nikki Haley	Mike Pence	Vivek Ramaswamy	Tim Scott	Donald Trump	Other	Undecided
Fabrizio, Lee & Associates	Oct 23–25, 2023	600 (LV)	± 4.0%	2%	12%	7%	3%	3%	1%	64%	2% (Note: "Doug Burgum & Asa Hutchinson with 1%; Larry Elder with 0%)	6%
J.L. Partners	Aug 12–17, 2023	418 (LV)	?	3%	15%	3%	2%	6%	3%	52%	3% (Note: "Someone else" with 2%; Doug Burgum with 1%; Larry Elder, Asa Hutchinson & Francis Suarez with 0%)	12%
J.L. Partners	Aug 12–17, 2023	418 (LV)	?	–	29%	–	–	–	–	56%	–	15%
Public Policy Polling (D)	Jun 19–20, 2023	510 (LV)	± 4.3%	4%	23%	5%	5%	3%	2%	46%	–	12%
Public Policy Polling (D)	Jun 19–20, 2023	510 (LV)	± 4.3%	–	37%	–	–	–	–	49%	–	14%
Echelon Insights	Aug 31 – Sep 7, 2022	142 (LV)	± 6.6%	–	28%	–	–	–	–	56%	–	16%

== See also ==
- 2024 Montana Democratic presidential primary
- 2024 Republican Party presidential primaries
- 2024 United States presidential election
- 2024 United States presidential election in Montana
- 2024 United States elections
