= 2024 Maryland Republican presidential primary =

- May 14, 2024

37 Republican National Convention delegates

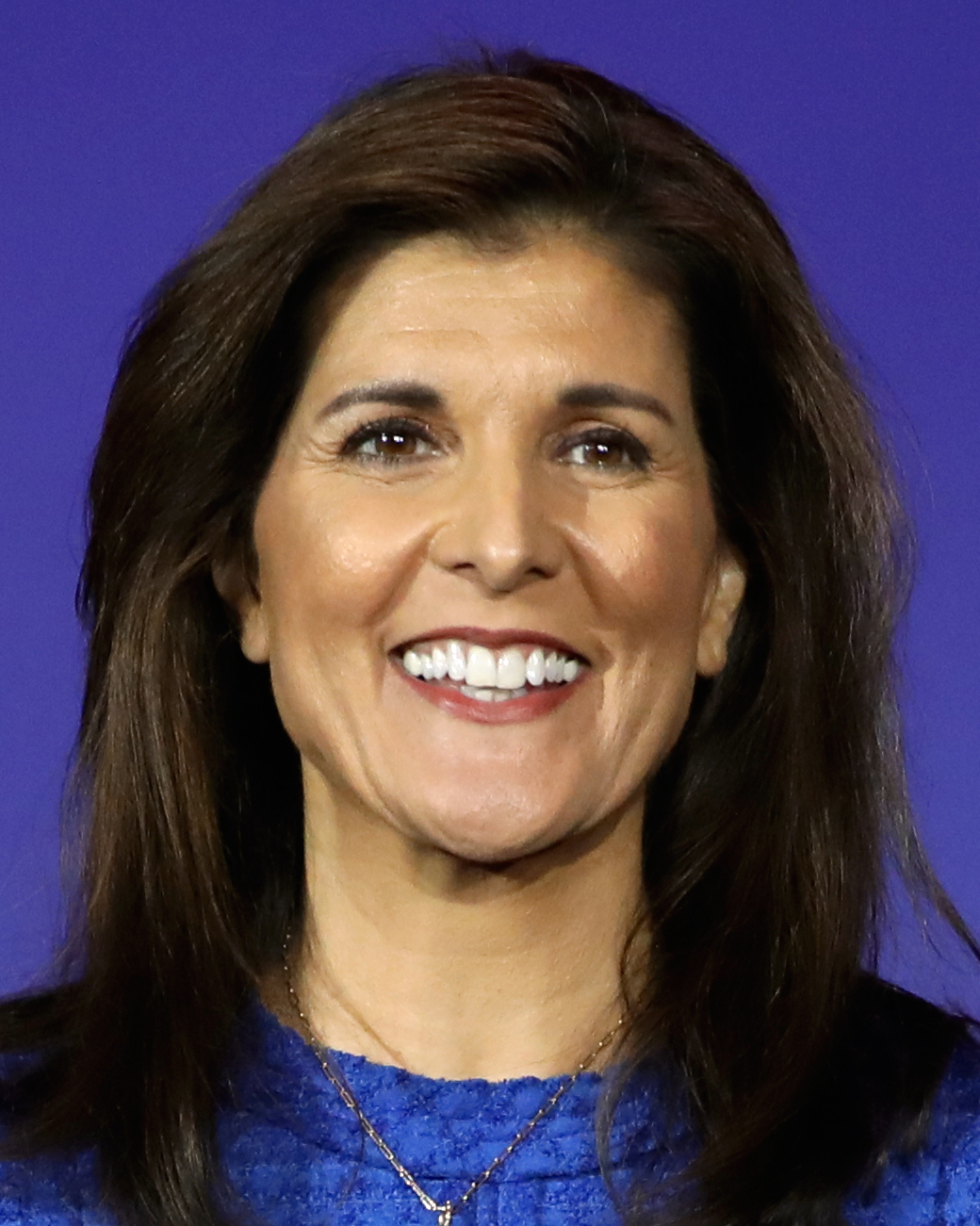
Candidate	Donald Trump	Nikki Haley (withdrawn)
Home state	Florida	South Carolina
Delegate count	37	0
Popular vote	220,493	64,592
Percentage	77.3%	22.7%
County results
Trump
60 – 70%
70 – 80%
80 – 90%

The 2024 Maryland Republican presidential primary was held on May 14, 2024, as part of the Republican Party primaries for the 2024 presidential election. 37 delegates to the 2024 Republican National Convention were allocated on a winner-take-all basis. The contest was held alongside primaries in Nebraska and West Virginia.

== Endorsements ==
Nikki Haley (withdrawn)

Governor

- Larry Hogan, 62nd Governor of Maryland (2015–2023)
Donald Trump

U.S. Representative

- Andy Harris, MD-01 (2011–present)

Party officials

- David Bossie, Republican National Committeeman from Maryland (2016–present)
- Dirk Haire, former chair of the Maryland Republican Party (2016–2022)

Individuals

- Kimberly Klacik, radio host and Republican nominee for MD-07 in 2020

== Results ==
Maryland Republican primary, May 14, 2024
Candidate	Votes	Percentage	Actual delegate count		
Candidate	Votes	Percentage	Bound	Unbound	Total
Donald Trump	205,996	77.7%	37	0	37
Nikki Haley (withdrawn)	56,506	21.3%	0	0	0
Uncommitted	2,607	1.0%	0	0	0
Total:	265,109	100.0%	37	0	37

== Polling ==
Poll source	Date(s) administered	Sample size	Margin of error	Ron DeSantis	Nikki Haley	Larry Hogan	Mike Pence	Tim Scott	Donald Trump	Other	Undecided
OpinionWorks	April 7–10, 2024	451 (LV)	± 4.6%	–	18%	–	–	–	74%	-	7%
Gonzales Research	May 30 – Jun 6, 2023	221 (LV)	± 3.5%	37%	-	-	-	-	42%	-	21%
co/efficient	Feb 19–20, 2023	1,007 (LV)	± 3.58%	27%	6%	18%	1%	1%	33%	2% (Note: Mike Pompeo with 2%)	12%
co/efficient	Feb 19–20, 2023	1,007 (LV)	± 3.58%	–	–	32%	–	–	59%	–	10%
co/efficient	Feb 19–20, 2023	1,007 (LV)	± 3.58%	39%	–	–	–	–	35%	–	26%
OpinionWorks	May 27 – Jun 2, 2022	428 (LV)	± 4.7%	12%	5%	25%	6%	–	48%	–	–

== See also ==
- 2024 Maryland Democratic presidential primary
- 2024 Republican Party presidential primaries
- 2024 United States presidential election
- 2024 United States presidential election in Maryland
- 2024 United States elections
