= 2024 Idaho Republican presidential caucuses =

- March 2, 2024

32 Republican National Convention delegates

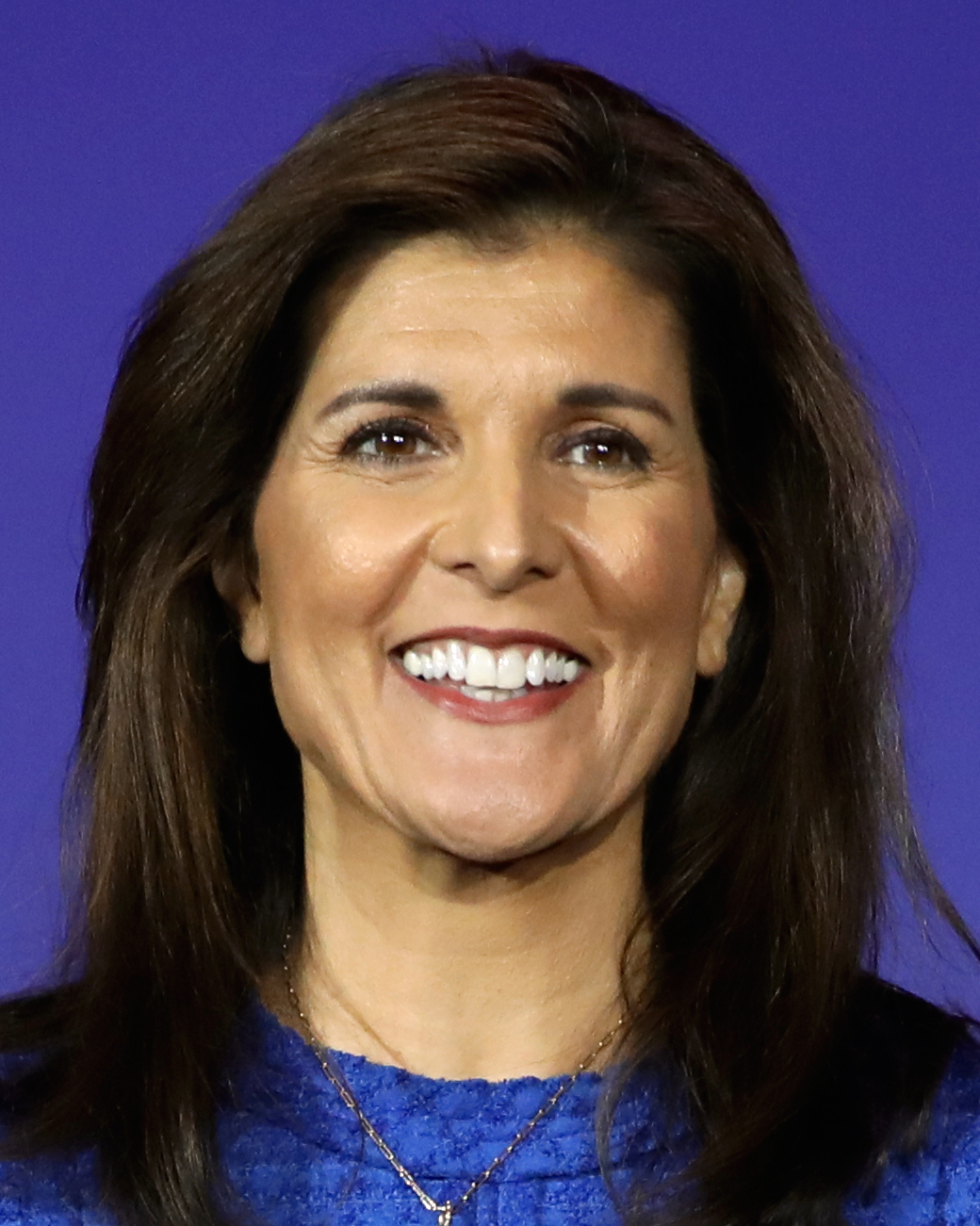
Candidate	Donald Trump	Nikki Haley
Home state	Florida	South Carolina
Delegate count	32	0
Popular vote	33,603	5,221
Percentage	84.89%	13.18%
County results
Trump
60 – 70%
70 – 80%
80 – 90%
>90%

The 2024 Idaho Republican presidential caucuses was held on March 2, 2024, as part of the Republican Party primaries for the 2024 presidential election. 32 delegates to the 2024 Republican National Convention were allocated on a winner-take-most basis.

== Procedure ==
If a candidate wins a majority of the statewide vote, they're awarded all 32 delegates. Otherwise, delegates are proportionally allocated to candidates receiving at least 15% of the vote.

== Candidates ==
The Idaho Republican Party has identified the following candidates, listed alphabetically, as Republican Party presidential candidates that will be included on ballots used for the Republican presidential caucus:

- Ryan Binkley (withdrew February 27, 2024)
- Chris Christie (withdrew January 10, 2024)
- Ron DeSantis (withdrew January 21, 2024)
- Nikki Haley
- Vivek Ramaswamy (withdrew January 15, 2024)
- Donald Trump

== Background ==
The Idaho legislature cancelled the primary, though it was not reinstated at a later date, as intended.

== Endorsements ==
Donald Trump

Governor

- Brad Little, (2019–present)

U.S. Senators

- Mike Crapo, (1999–present)
- Jim Risch, (2009–present)

U.S. Representatives

- Russ Fulcher, ID-01 (2019–present)
- Mike Simpson, ID-02 (1999–present)
Nikki Haley

State executive officials

- David H. Leroy, State Treasurer (1983-1987)

State senators

- Patti Anne Lodge, District 11 (2000–2022)

State Representatives

- Kelley Packer, Member of the Idaho House of Representatives from District 28 Seat B (2012-2018)
- Lori McCann, Member of the Idaho House of Representatives from Seat 6A (2021-Present)
- Laurie Lickley, 25 Seat A (2018–2022)

== Results ==
The race was called for Donald Trump at 6:56PM (EST).

Idaho Republican caucus, March 2, 2024
Candidate	Votes	Percentage	Actual delegate count		
Candidate	Votes	Percentage	Bound	Unbound	Total
Donald Trump	33,603	84.89%	32	0	32
Nikki Haley	5,221	13.18%	0	0	0
Ron DeSantis (withdrawn)	534	1.35%	0	0	0
Vivek Ramaswamy (withdrawn)	95	0.24%	0	0	0
Chris Christie (withdrawn)	91	0.23%	0	0	0
Ryan Binkley (withdrawn)	40	0.10%	0	0	0
Total	39,584	100.00%	32	0	32

== See also ==
- 2024 Republican Party presidential primaries
- 2024 United States presidential election
- 2024 United States presidential election in Idaho
- 2024 United States elections
