= 2024 New Jersey Republican presidential primary =

- June 4, 2024

12 Republican National Convention delegates

Candidate	Donald Trump	Write-in votes
Home state	Florida	–
Popular vote	300,919	8,796
Percentage	97.2%	2.8%
Trump
>90%

The 2024 New Jersey Republican presidential primary was held on June 4, 2024, as part of the Republican Party primaries for the 2024 presidential election. Nine delegates to the 2024 Republican National Convention were allocated on a winner-take-all basis. The contest was among the last in the Republican primary cycle, held alongside primaries in Montana, New Mexico, and South Dakota.

== Process ==
New Jersey had 40 of its delegates removed for scheduling its primary after May 31.

== Endorsements ==
Chris Christie (withdrawn)

U.S. Senators

- Jeffrey Chiesa, New Jersey (2013); Attorney General of New Jersey (2012–2013)

Party officials

- Bill Palatucci, Republican National Committeeman from New Jersey (2010–present)
Nikki Haley (withdrawn)

Party chapters

- Fanwood Republicans
Donald Trump

U.S. Representatives

- Jeff Van Drew, NJ-02 (2019–present)

State legislators

- Robert Auth, NJ Assembly (2014–present)
- Samuel D. Thompson, NJ Senate (2012–2024) (Democratic)
- Beth Sawyer, Member of the New Jersey General Assembly from the 3rd district (2022–2024)

Party chapters

- Rahway Republicans

Political parties

- Hunterdon County Republican Party
- Union County Republican Party

=== Maps ===
Endorsements by incumbent Republicans in the New Jersey Senate. Endorsed Donald Trump (2) No endorsement (13)

== Polling ==
Poll source	Date(s) administered	Sample size	Margin of error	Chris Christie	Ron DeSantis	Nikki Haley	Asa Hutchinson	Mike Pence	Vivek Ramaswamy	Tim Scott	Donald Trump	Other	Undecided
Morning Consult	Nov 1–30, 2023	764(LV)	–	4%	10%	10%	–	–	7%	0%	66%	0% (Note: Doug Burgum with 0%)	3%
Morning Consult	Oct 1–31, 2023	824(LV)	–	4%	12%	6%	1%	3%	6%	1%	66%	0% (Note: Doug Burgum with 0%)	1%
Morning Consult	Sep 1–30, 2023	793(LV)	–	4%	10%	6%	0%	2%	9%	2%	64%	0% (Note: Doug Burgum with 0%)	3%
Morning Consult	Aug 1–31, 2023	900(LV)	–	5%	12%	4%	0%	3%	7%	3%	65%	1% (Note: Will Hurd with 1%; Doug Burgum and Francis Suarez with 0%)	–
Morning Consult	July 1–31, 2023	891(LV)	–	4%	16%	2%	0%	5%	9%	3%	59%	0% (Note: Will Hurd and Francis Suarez with 0%)	2%
Morning Consult	June 1–30, 2023	818(LV)	–	5%	18%	3%	1%	5%	4%	2%	61%	0% (Note: Doug Burgum, Liz Cheney, and Will Hurd with 0%)	1%
Morning Consult	May 1–31, 2023	897(LV)	–	–	20%	4%	1%	4%	4%	2%	60%	3% (Note: Liz Cheney with 3%; Greg Abbott with 1%; Kristi Noem with 0%)	1%
Morning Consult	Apr 1–30, 2023	851(LV)	–	–	27%	2%	0%	7%	3%	2%	56%	3% (Note: Liz Cheney with 2%; Greg Abbott with 1%; Kristi Noem and Mike Pompeo with 0%)	1%
Morning Consult	Mar 1–31, 2023	896(LV)	–	–	36%	3%	–	5%	0%	1%	48%	7% (Note: Liz Cheney with 3%; Greg Abbott, Kristi Noem, Mike Pompeo, and Glenn Youngkin with 1%)	–
Morning Consult	Feb 1–28, 2023	746(LV)	–	–	34%	3%	–	6%	0%	0%	50%	6% (Note: Liz Cheney with 4%; Ted Cruz with 2%; Greg Abbott, Kristi Noem, Mike Pompeo and Glenn Youngkin with 0%)	1%
Morning Consult	Jan 1–31, 2023	923(LV)	–	–	37%	1%	–	6%	–	1%	47%	7% (Note: Liz Cheney with 3%; Ted Cruz, Kristi Noem, Mike Pompeo, and Glenn Youngkin with 1%; Greg Abbott with 0%)	1%
Morning Consult	Dec 1–31, 2022	528 (LV)	–	–	38%	2%	–	6%	–	1%	43%	7% (Note: Liz Cheney with 4%; Greg Abbott, Ted Cruz, and Glenn Youngkin with 1%; Kristi Noem and Mike Pompeo with 0%)	3%

== Results ==
=== Primary results ===
New Jersey Republican primary, June 4, 2024
Candidate	Votes	Percentage	Actual delegate count		
Candidate	Votes	Percentage	Bound	Unbound	Total
Donald Trump	294,658	96.7%	12	0	12
Write-in votes	9,915	3.3%	0	0	0
Total:	304,573	100.00%	12	0	12

=== Convention results ===
Hunterdon County Republican convention
Party	Candidate	Votes	%
Republican	Donald Trump	106	67.95%
Republican	Nikki Haley	50	32.05%
Total votes		156	100.0%

Union County Republican convention
Party	Candidate	Votes	%
Republican	Donald Trump	152	69.41%
Republican	Nikki Haley	67	30.59%
Total votes		219	100.0%

== See also ==
- 2024 New Jersey Democratic presidential primary
- 2024 Republican Party presidential primaries
- 2024 United States presidential election
- 2024 United States presidential election in New Jersey
- 2024 United States elections
