= 2024 Nebraska Republican presidential primary =

- May 14, 2024

36 Republican National Convention delegates

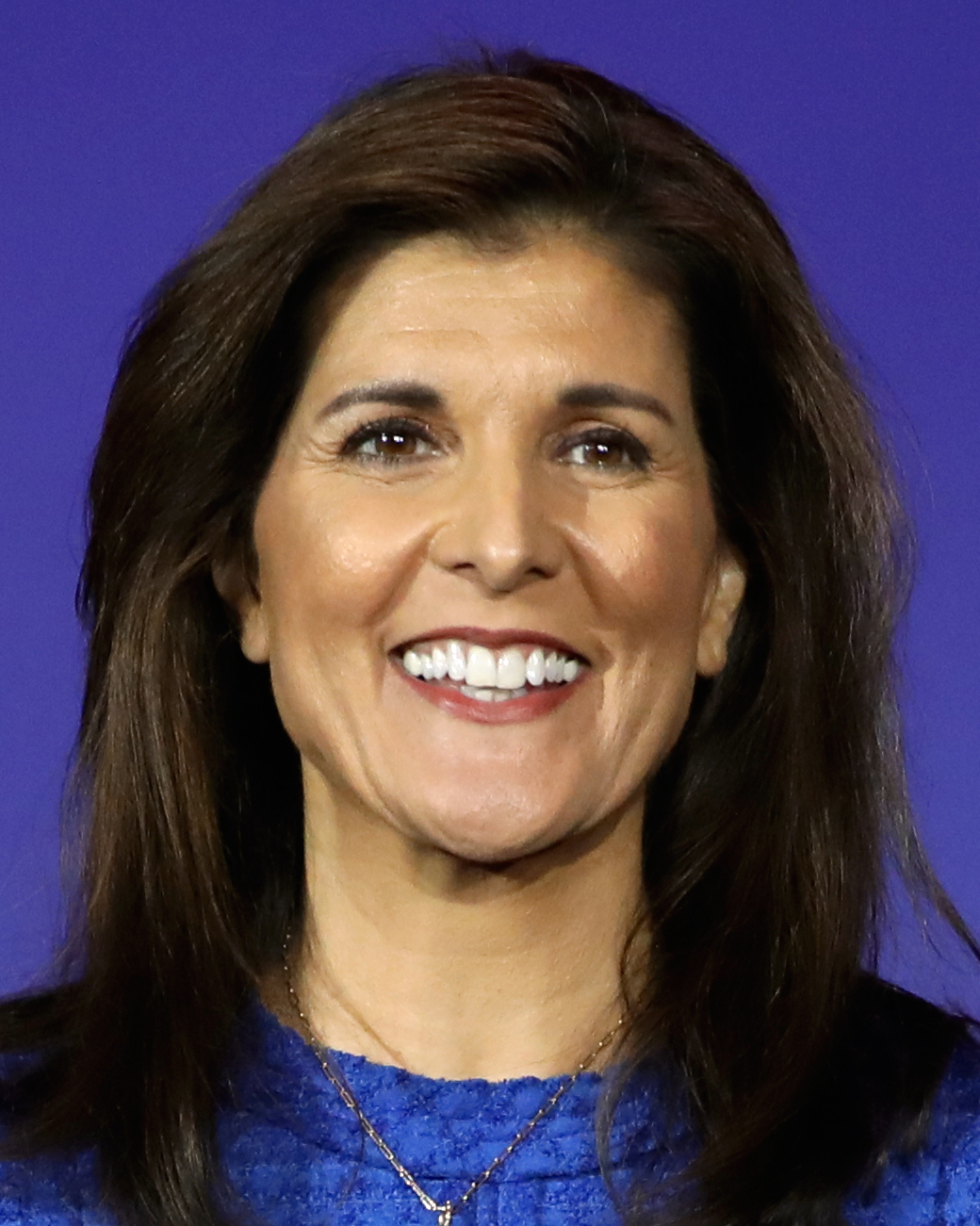
Candidate	Donald Trump	Nikki Haley (withdrawn)
Home state	Florida	South Carolina
Delegate count	36	0
Popular vote	167,968	38,246
Percentage	79.94%	18.20%

Trump
70–80%
80–90%
>90%

The 2024 Nebraska Republican presidential primary was held on May 14, 2024, as part of the Republican Party primaries for the 2024 presidential election. 36 delegates to the 2024 Republican National Convention were allocated on a winner-take-all basis. The contest was held alongside primaries in Maryland and West Virginia.

== Endorsements ==
Donald Trump

Notable individual

- Chuck Herbster, agribusiness executive; Republican candidate for Governor in 2014 and 2022

== Results ==
Nebraska Republican primary, May 14, 2024
Candidate	Votes	Percentage	Actual delegate count		
Candidate	Votes	Percentage	Bound	Unbound	Total
Donald Trump	167,968	79.94%	36		36
Nikki Haley (withdrawn)	38,246	18.20%			
Perry Johnson (withdrawn)	3,902	1.86%			
Total:	211,787	100.00%	36		36

== See also ==
- 2024 Nebraska Democratic presidential primary
- 2024 Republican Party presidential primaries
- 2024 United States presidential election
- 2024 United States presidential election in Nebraska
- 2024 United States elections
