= 2024 North Dakota Republican presidential caucuses =

- March 4, 2024

29 Republican National Convention delegates

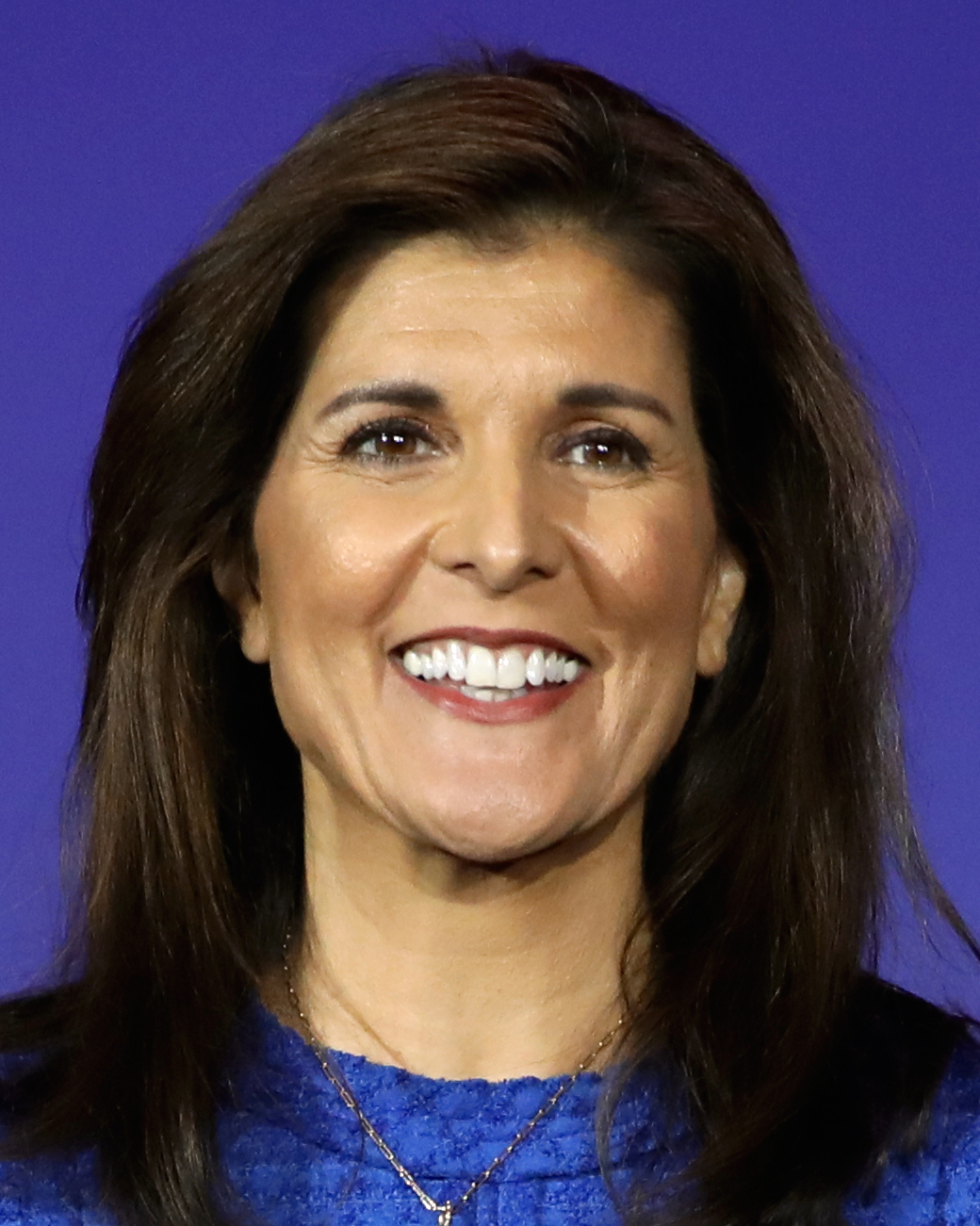
Candidate	Donald Trump	Nikki Haley
Home state	Florida	South Carolina
Delegate count	29	0
Popular vote	1,632	273
Percentage	84.43%	14.12%
County results
Trump
80 – 90%
>90%
No polling area

The 2024 North Dakota Republican presidential caucuses were held on March 4, 2024, as part of the Republican Party primaries for the 2024 presidential election. 29 delegates to the 2024 Republican National Convention were allocated to candidates.

The North Dakota caucuses were the last 2024 Republican presidential nominating contest before Super Tuesday, where 15 states and 865 total delegates will be up for election.

Donald Trump won all 29 delegates in the North Dakota caucuses.

== Procedure ==
Voting was held at 12 locations across the state from 5 to 8 p.m. CST. If a candidate receives over 60% of the vote, they win all 29 delegates allocated to North Dakota, but if no candidate reaches the threshold, delegates are allocated proportionally to candidates receiving over 20% of the vote.

== Endorsements ==
Doug Burgum (withdrawn)

U.S. Senators

- Kevin Cramer (2019–present) (Switched endorsement to Donald Trump)
- John Hoeven (2011–present); Governor of North Dakota (2000–2010) (Switched endorsement to Donald Trump)

U.S. Representatives

- Kelly Armstrong, ND-AL (2019–present)

Notable individuals

- Josh Duhamel, actor
Donald Trump

Governor

- Doug Burgum (2016–present) (previously was a candidate)

Lieutenant Governor

- Tammy Miller (2023–present)

U.S. Senators

- Kevin Cramer (2019–present) (previously endorsed Doug Burgum)
- John Hoeven (2011–present); Governor of North Dakota (2000–2010) (previously endorsed Doug Burgum)

State senators

- Jeffery Magrum, Member of the North Dakota Senate from the 8th district (2022–present)

== Polling ==
Poll source	Date(s) administered	Sample size (Note: Key: A – all adults RV – registered voters LV – likely voters V – unclear)	Margin of error	Doug Burgum	Ron DeSantis	Nikki Haley	Donald Trump	Other	Undecided
WPA Intelligence (Note: Poll sponsored by the North Dakota News Cooperative)	November 5–7, 2023	517 (V)	± 4.3%	12%	14%	10%	54%	4%	6%

== Results ==
North Dakota Republican caucus, March 4, 2024
Candidate	Votes	Percentage	Actual delegate count		
Candidate	Votes	Percentage	Bound	Unbound	Total
Donald Trump	1,632	84.43%	29	0	29
Nikki Haley	273	14.12%	0	0	0
David Stuckenberg	19	0.98%	0	0	0
Ryan Binkley (withdrawn)	9	0.47%	0	0	0
Total:	1,933	100.00%	29	0	29

== See also ==
- 2024 North Dakota Democratic presidential primary
- 2024 Republican Party presidential primaries
- 2024 United States presidential election
- 2024 United States presidential election in North Dakota
- 2024 United States elections

== Notes ==
Partisan clients
