= 2024 Maine Democratic presidential primary =

- March 5, 2024

32 delegates (24 pledged, 8 unpledged) to the Democratic National Convention

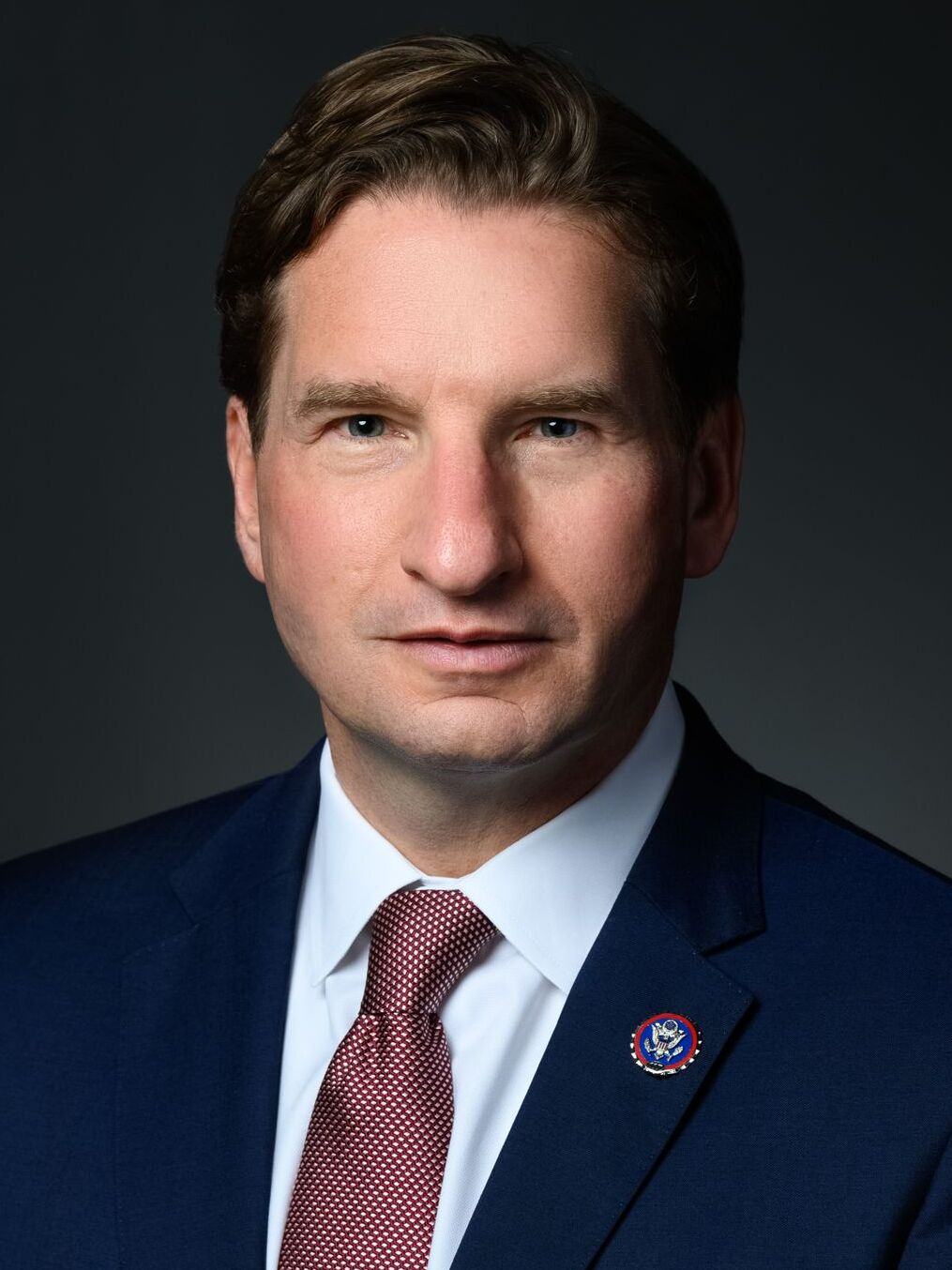
Candidate	Joe Biden	Blank ballots	Dean Phillips
Home state	Delaware	–	Minnesota
Delegate count	24	–	0
Popular vote	60,018	7,359	4,623
Percentage	82.8%	10.2%	6.4%

Biden
70 – 80%
80 – 90%
Won
Phillips
Won
Tie
40 – 50%
No votes

The 2024 Maine Democratic presidential primary took place on March 5, 2024, as part of the Democratic Party primaries for the 2024 presidential election. 24 delegates to the Democratic National Convention were allocated, with 8 additional unpledged delegates. The contest was held on Super Tuesday alongside primaries in 14 other states and territories.

As the incumbent, Joe Biden easily won around 83% of votes, with limited opposition from representative Dean Philips, who gathered just over 6% of the vote. Additionally, there was a portion of more than 10 % of blank ballots, inspired by the anti-Gaza war movements in the previous primaries of New Hampshire and Michigan.

== Procedure ==
This was the first semi-closed primary where while party members could only vote in their respective party's primary, unenrolled voters were allowed to choose a party's primary to participate in. This change in law from Maine's previous closed primary went into effect on May 14, 2022, without Gov. Janet Mills' signature. The state party also received a waiver to use a ranked-choice voting system, as it had been introduced in Maine state elections, but due to only two candidates on the ballot, this became unnecessary.

== Candidates ==
The filing deadline was December 1. Two candidates met the requirements to collect 2,000 signatures and appear on the ballot:

- Joe Biden
- Dean Phillips

=== Write-in campaign ===
The Maine Coalition for Palestine launched an effort to convince voters to write-in "Ceasefire" in the primary, drawing inspiration from a similar campaign in New Hampshire and the success of the campaign for uncommitted votes in Michigan. However, as Maine state law only requires that votes for declared write-in candidates be tallied, these votes were counted as blank ballots.

== Endorsements ==
Joe Biden

Individuals

- Donald Sussman, hedge fund executive

== Polling ==
Poll source	Date(s) administered	Sample size (Note: Key: A – all adults RV – registered voters LV – likely voters V – unclear)	Margin of error	Joe Biden	Cory Booker	Pete Buttigieg	Kamala Harris	Amy Klobuchar	Gavin Newsom	Jared Polis	Bernie Sanders	Elizabeth Warren	Marianne Williamson
Digital Research Inc.	Mar 22 – April 22, 2023	202 (LV)	–	31%	3%	11%	18%	4%	2%	1%	27%	10%	1%

== Results ==
2024 Maine Democratic pres. primary
Candidate	Votes	%	Delegates
Joe Biden (incumbent)	60,018	82.81	24
Dean Phillips	4,623	6.38	0
Other candidates (write-in) (Note: The names of write-in votes were only published as "Others".)	480	0.66	—
Blank ballots	7,359	10.15	—
Total	72,480	100%	24

=== Results by county ===
Biden won every county by a comfortable margin. He performed best in Lincoln County, reaching slightly less than 90% of the vote. Conversely, he recorded his worst result in Aroostook County, where both Phillips and blank ballots reached their best performance. Phillips secured the second place in Franklin, Kennebec and Oxford counties, while falling to the third in the other thirteen.

County	Biden	Phillips	Blank
Androscoggin	77.77%	10.18%	11.38%
Aroostook	73.42%	10.72%	15.17%
Cumberland	81.71%	5.23%	12.91%
Franklin	84.5%	8.3%	6.98%
Hancock	84.91%	4.32%	9.66%
Kennebec	84.65%	7.44%	6.66%
Knox	85.71%	3.96%	9.58%
Lincoln	88.59%	4.25%	7.16%
Oxford	83.01%	8.31%	7.1%
Penobscot	81.12%	7.77%	8.73%
Piscataquis	81.5%	9.06%	9.45%
Sagadahoc	85.46%	4.78%	7.92%
Somerset	80.04%	9.08%	9.22%
Waldo	82.54%	5.19%	11%
Washington	81.93%	6.69%	10.08%
York	84.37%	7.26%	8.36%

=== Results by congressional district ===
Biden won both districts by more than 80% of the vote. Both he and blank votes performed better in the smaller, more urban first district, while Phillips recorded a better result in the larger, more rural second district, which was also the only one in New England to back Donald Trump in 2020.

District	Biden	Phillips	Blank
1st	83.37%	5.77%	10.56%
2nd	81.83%	7.42%	9.46%

== See also ==
- 2024 Maine Republican presidential primary
- 2024 Democratic Party presidential primaries
- 2024 United States presidential election
- 2024 United States presidential election in Maine
- 2024 United States elections
