= 2024 Puerto Rico Republican presidential primary =

- April 21, 2024

23 Republican National Convention delegates
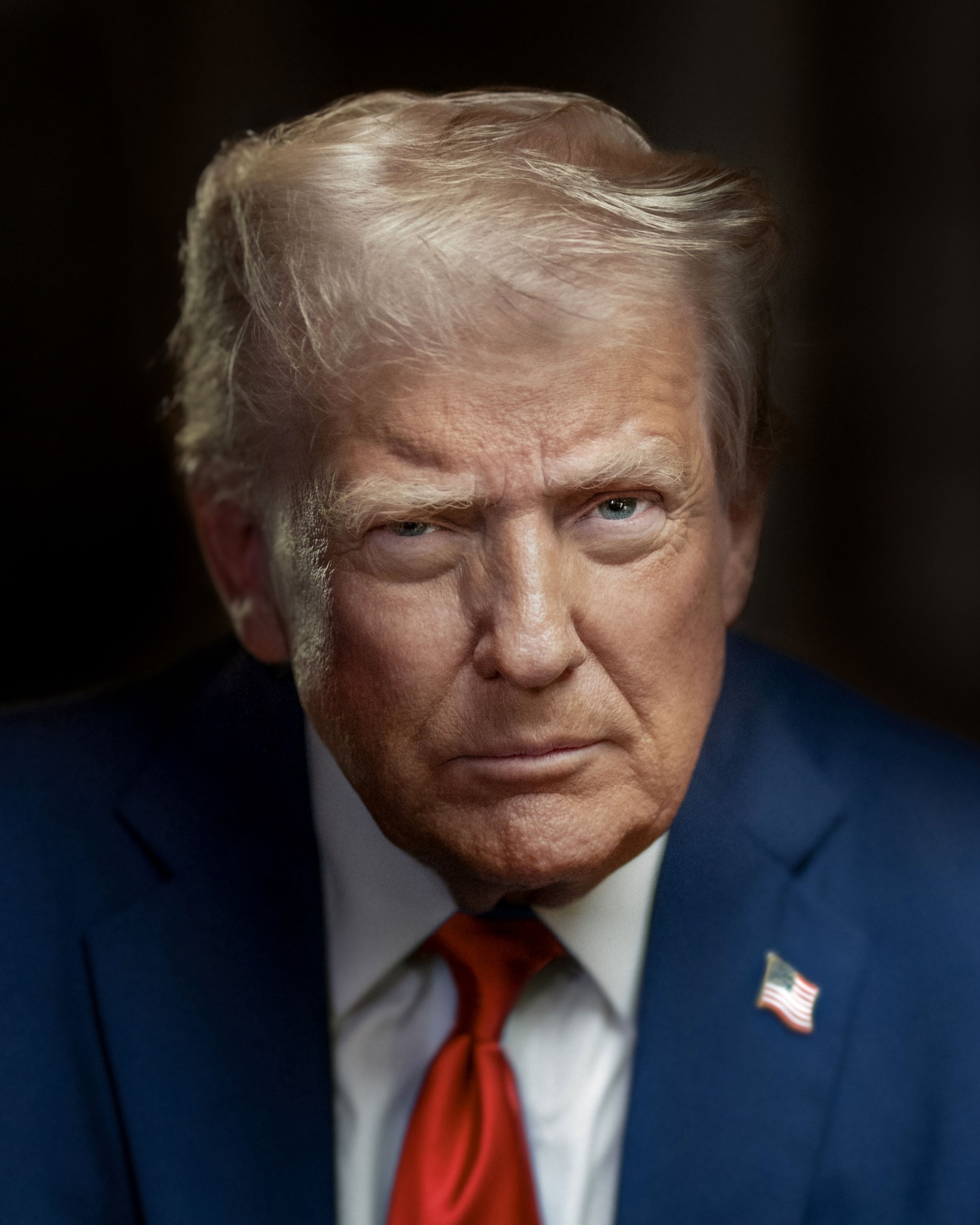

Candidate	Donald Trump	Write-in
Home state	Florida
Delegate count	23	0
Popular vote	992	39
Percentage	96.22%	3.78%

The 2024 Puerto Rico Republican presidential primary was held on April 21, 2024, as part of the Republican Party primaries for the 2024 presidential election. 23 delegates to the 2024 Republican National Convention were allocated on a winner-takes-most basis.

Former president and presumptive nominee Donald Trump ran unopposed and won all 23 delegates.

== Candidates ==
=== Declared candidates ===
- Donald Trump
- Nikki Haley (withdrawn)
- Asa Hutchinson (withdrawn)
- Vivek Ramaswamy (withdrawn)
- Ron DeSantis (withdrawn)
- Chris Christie (withdrawn)

== Results ==
Puerto Rico Republican primary, April 21, 2024
Candidate	Votes	Percentage	Actual delegate count		
Candidate	Votes	Percentage	Bound	Unbound	Total
Donald Trump	992	96.22%	23	0	23
Write-in votes	39	3.78%	0	0	0
Total:	1,031	100.00%	23	0	23

== See also ==
- 2024 Republican Party presidential primaries
- 2024 United States presidential election
- 2024 Puerto Rico presidential primaries
- 2024 United States elections
