= 2024 U.S. Virgin Islands Republican presidential caucuses =

- February 8, 2024

4 Republican National Convention delegates

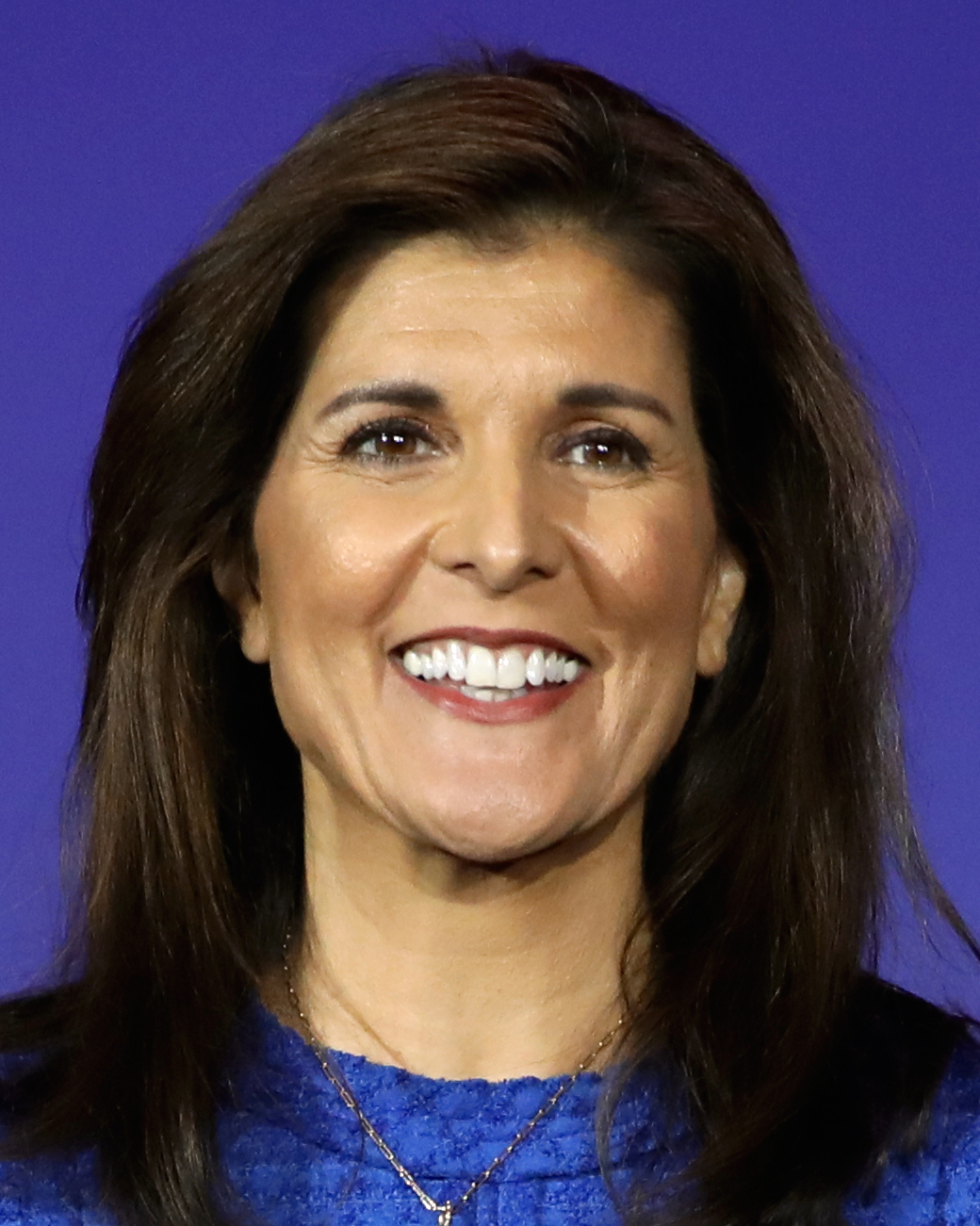

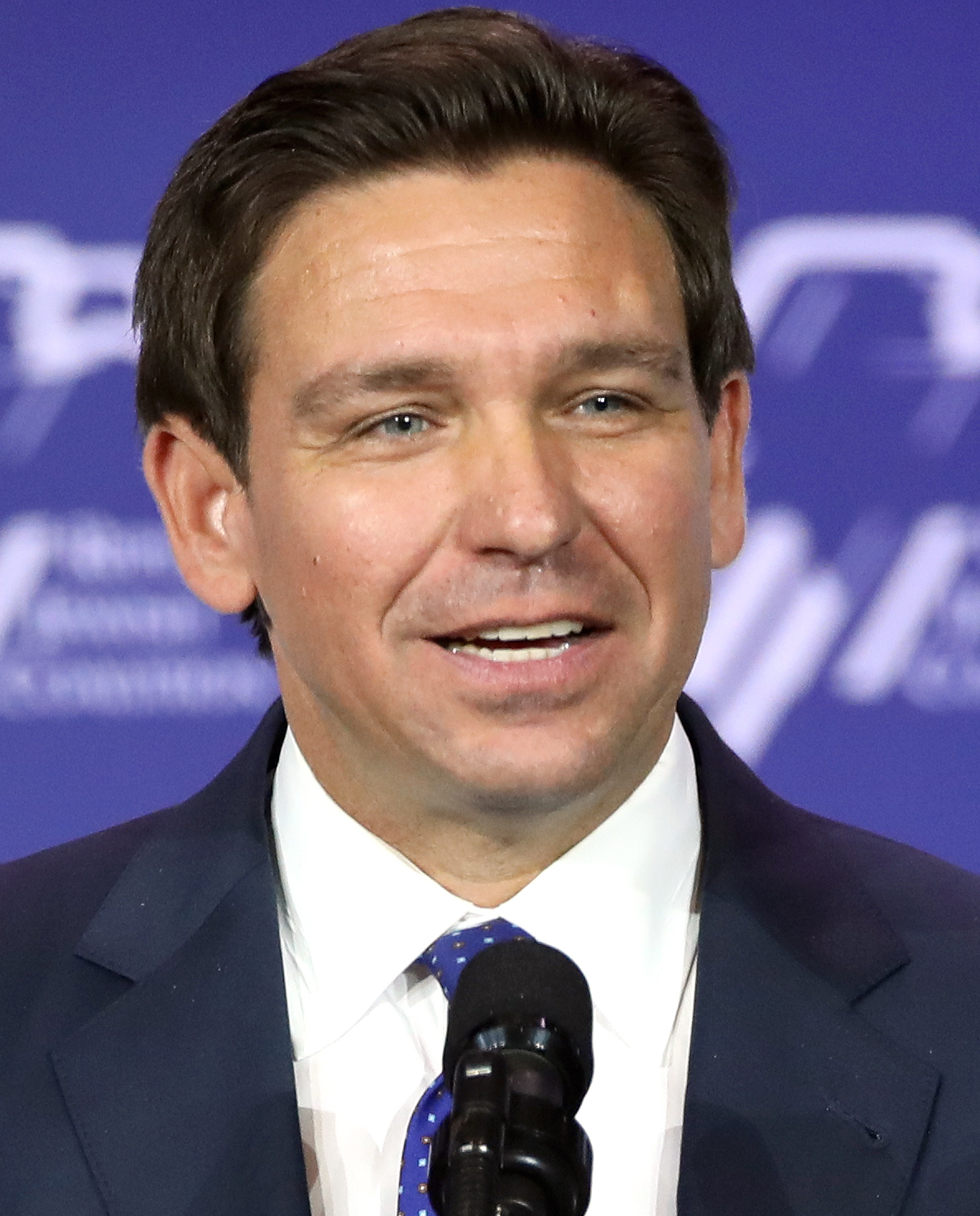
Candidate	Donald Trump	Nikki Haley	Ron DeSantis (withdrawn)
Home state	Florida	South Carolina	Florida
Delegate count	4	0	0
First choice	180 (69.5%)	52 (20.1%)	15 (5.8%)
Final round	187 (74.2%)	65 (25.8%)	Eliminated

The 2024 U.S. Virgin Islands Republican presidential caucuses were held on February 8, 2024, as part of the Republican Party primaries for the 2024 presidential election. Although the United States Virgin Islands will not participate in the 2024 presidential general election because it is a U.S. territory and not a state, it equally participated in the U.S. presidential caucuses and primaries. The caucus took place the same day as the Nevada caucuses.

The caucus was won by former President Donald Trump, defeating former U.N. Ambassador and South Carolina governor Nikki Haley. Trump won with 187 votes, winning all of the territory's convention delegates. The Republican Party in the Virgin Islands selected nine delegates, although the number of delegates seated by the convention may be reduced to as few as four due to alleged violations of national Republican rules.

== Procedure ==
Under RNC Rule No. 16(c)(2), any caucus held prior to March 15 must allocate its delegates proportionally to the number of votes for each candidate. The RNC alleged that using ranked-choice voting before March 15, 2024, was a violation of RNC rules.

== Controversy ==
The number of delegates for the U.S. Virgin Islands may be reduced due to a Republican National Convention (RNC) rule violation.

The Republican Party in the Virgin Islands scheduled its caucus before March 15 and used ranked-choice voting instead of a proportional system. Party leaders attempted to oust chairman Gordon Ackley due to the disagreement, though RNC Chief Counsel Matt Raymer ruled that the meeting was not held in compliance with "party rules".

== Candidates ==
- Donald Trump
- Nikki Haley
- Chris Christie (withdrawn)
- Ron DeSantis (withdrawn)
- Perry Johnson (withdrawn)
- Vivek Ramaswamy (withdrawn)

== Results ==
The Republican Party in the U.S. Virgin Islands awarded all delegates to Trump.

Virgin Islands Republican caucus, February 8, 2024
Candidate	First Choice			Round 1			Round 2			Round 3			Round 4		Actual delegate count		
Candidate	Votes	%	Transfer	Votes	%	Transfer	Votes	%	Transfer	Votes	%	Transfer	Votes	%	Bound	Unbound	Total
Donald Trump	180	69.50%	+0	180	69.50%	+1	181	69.88%	+2	183	71.48%	+4	187	74.21%	1	3	4
Nikki Haley	52	20.08%	+2	54	20.85%	+0	54	20.85%	+0	54	21.09%	+11	65	25.79%	0		
Ron DeSantis (withdrawn)	15	5.79%	+0	15	5.79%	+2	17	6.56%	+2	19	7.42%	−19	Eliminated		0		
Perry Johnson (withdrawn)	6	2.32%	+1	7	2.70%	+0	7	2.70%	−7	Eliminated					0		
Vivek Ramaswamy (withdrawn)	3	1.16%	+0	3	1.16%	−3	Eliminated								0		
Chris Christie (withdrawn)	3	1.16%	−3	Eliminated											0		
Total	259			259			259			256			252		1	3	4
Blank or inactive ballots	0		+0	0		+0	0		+3	3		+4	7		—		

== See also ==
- 2024 U.S. Virgin Islands Democratic presidential caucuses
- 2024 Republican Party presidential primaries
- 2024 United States presidential election
- 2024 United States elections
