= 2024 Northern Mariana Islands Republican presidential caucuses =

- March 15, 2024

9 Republican National Convention delegates

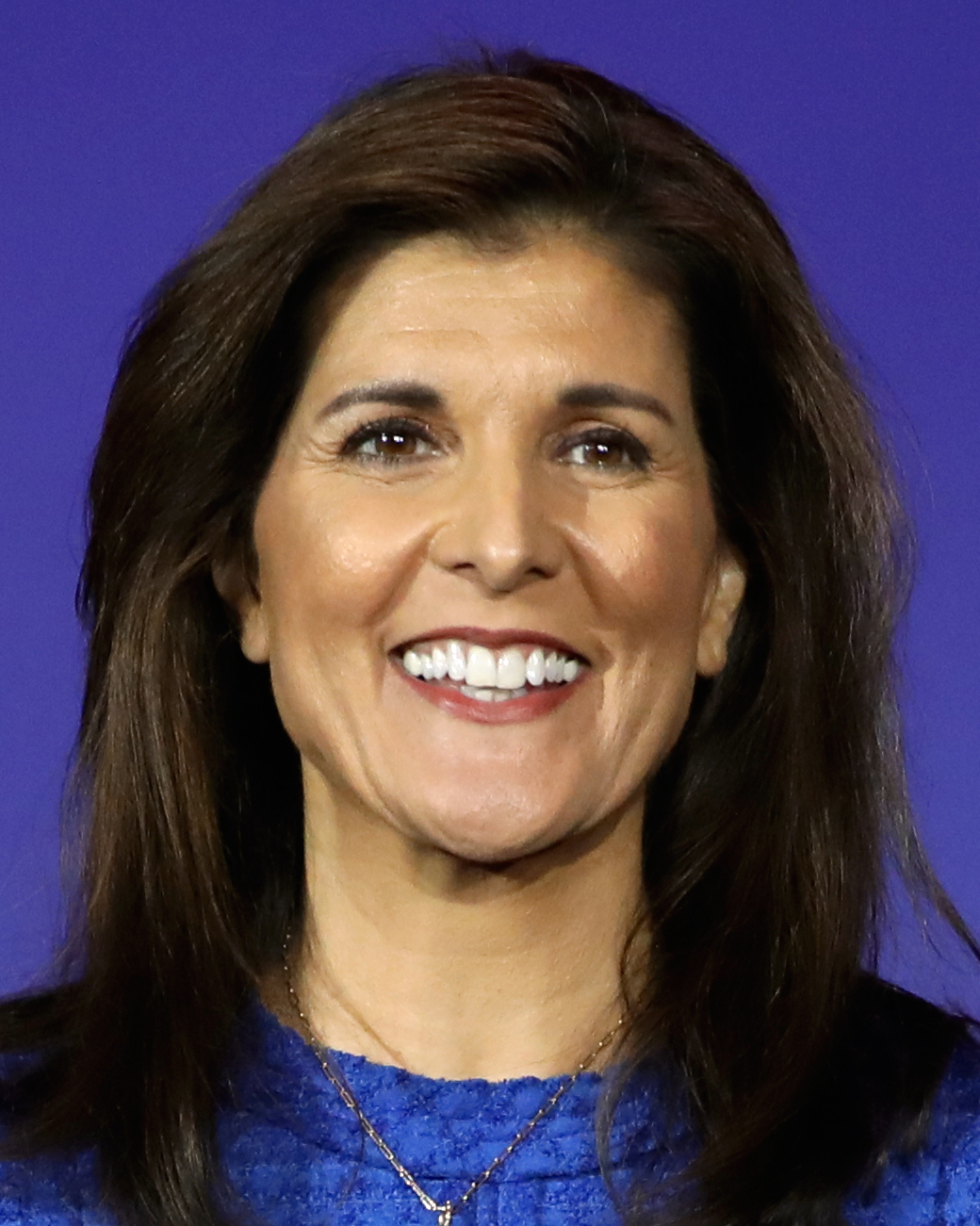
Candidate	Donald Trump	Nikki Haley (withdrawn)
Home state	Florida	South Carolina
Delegate count	9	0
Popular vote	319	35
Percentage	90.11%	9.89%

The 2024 Northern Mariana Islands Republican presidential caucuses were held on March 15, 2024, as part of the Republican Party primaries for the 2024 presidential election. 9 delegates to the 2024 Republican National Convention were allocated on a proportional basis.

== Candidates ==
=== Declared candidates ===
- Donald Trump
- Nikki Haley (withdrawn)
- Asa Hutchinson (withdrawn)
- Vivek Ramaswamy (withdrawn)
- Ron DeSantis (withdrawn)
- Chris Christie (withdrawn)

== Results ==
Northern Mariana Islands Republican caucuses, March 12, 2024
Candidate	Votes	Percentage	Actual delegate count		
Candidate	Votes	Percentage	Bound	Unbound	Total
Donald Trump	319	90.11%	9	0	9
Nikki Haley	35	9.89%	0	0	0
Total:	354	100.00%	9	0	9

== See also ==
- 2024 Northern Mariana Islands Democratic presidential caucuses
- 2024 Republican Party presidential primaries
- 2024 United States presidential election
- 2024 United States elections
