= 2024 Alaska Republican presidential primary =

- March 5, 2024

29 Republican National Convention delegates

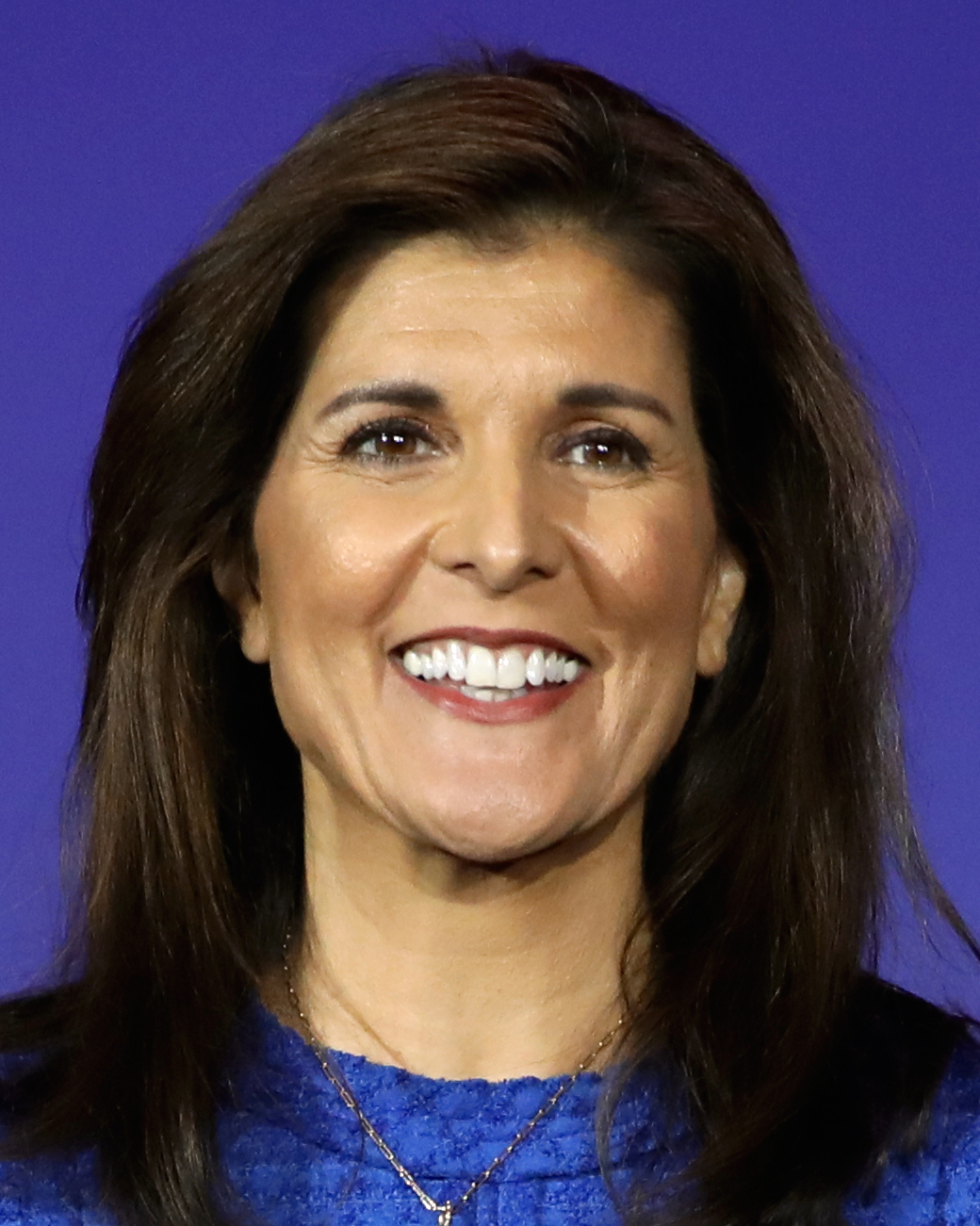
Candidate	Donald Trump	Nikki Haley
Home state	Florida	South Carolina
Delegate count	29	0
Popular vote	9,243	1,266
Percentage	87.58%	12.00%
State house district results
Trump
70 – 80%
80 – 90%
>90%
No votes

The 2024 Alaska Republican presidential primary was held on March 5, 2024, as part of the Republican Party primaries for the 2024 presidential election. 29 delegates to the 2024 Republican National Convention were allocated on a proportional basis. The contest was held on Super Tuesday alongside primaries in 14 other states.

== Background ==
In the 2016 Republican presidential contest, Senator Ted Cruz won the Alaska caucuses with 36.4% of the vote, while Donald Trump followed closely with 33.6% of the vote. In the 2020 primaries, the Alaska Republican Party canceled their caucuses on the basis that Trump was the incumbent and "a PPP (presidential preference poll) need not be conducted."

== Endorsements ==
Nikki Haley

U.S. Senator

- Lisa Murkowski, (2002–present)

State Senator

- Bert Stedman (2003–present)

State Representative

- Louise Stutes (2015–present), Speaker of the Alaska House (2021–2023)

State executive officials

- Mead Treadwell, Lieutenant Governor of Alaska (2010–2014)

Mayors

- Glenda Ledford, Mayor of Wasilla
- David Pruhs, Mayor of Fairbanks
Donald Trump

Governors

- Mike Dunleavy (2018–present)
- Sarah Palin (2006–2009)

State executive officials

- Nancy Dahlstrom, Lieutenant Governor of Alaska (2022-present) and 2024 U.S. House candidate
- Kelly Tshibaka, Commissioner of the Alaska Department of Administration (2019-2021) and 2022 U.S. Senate candidate

Notable individual

- Nick Begich III, Alaska Policy Forum board member, grandson of former U.S. Representative Nick Begich Sr., and 2024 U.S. House candidate

== Results ==
Alaska Republican primary, March 5, 2024
Candidate	Votes	Percentage	Actual delegate count		
Candidate	Votes	Percentage	Bound	Unbound	Total
Donald Trump	9,243	87.58%	29		29
Nikki Haley	1,266	12.00%			
Vivek Ramaswamy (withdrawn)	45	0.43%			
Total:	10,554	100.00%	29		29

== See also ==
- 2024 Republican Party presidential primaries
- 2024 Alaska Democratic presidential primary
- 2024 United States presidential election
- 2024 United States presidential election in Alaska
- 2024 United States elections
