= 2024 American Samoa presidential caucuses =

2024 United States presidential caucuses in American Samoa
- 2024 American Samoa Democratic presidential caucus
- March 5, 2024

11 delegates (6 pledged and 5 unpledged) to the Democratic National Convention
- Turnout: 0.6% (registered voters) ▼1.6 pp
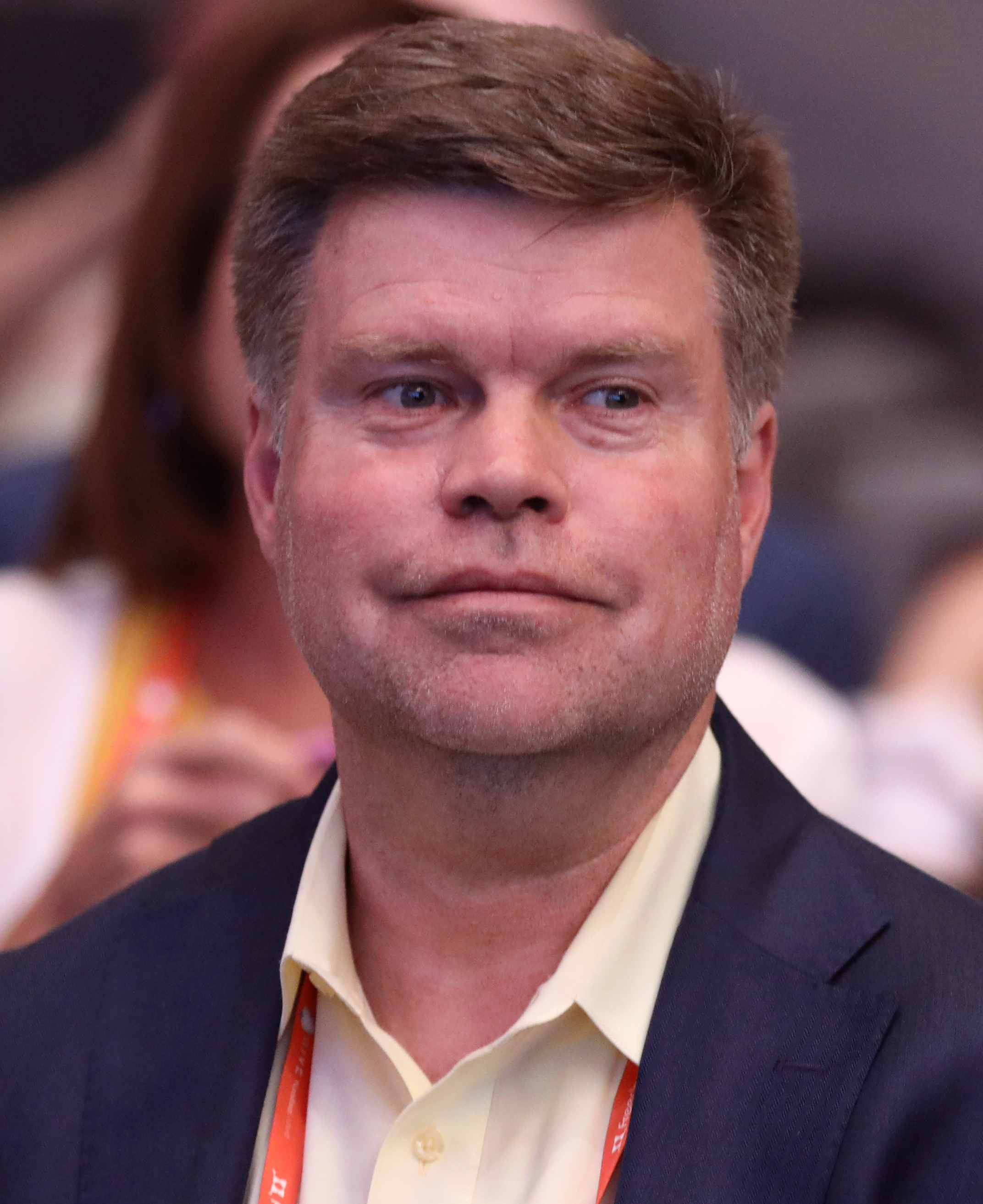

Candidate	Jason Palmer	Joe Biden
Home state	Maryland	Delaware
Delegate count	3	3
Popular vote	51	40
Percentage	56.0%	44.0%
- 2024 American Samoa Republican presidential caucus
- March 8, 2024

9 Republican National Convention delegates
Candidate	Donald Trump
Home state	Florida
Delegate count	9
Popular vote	110
Percentage	100.00%

Although American Samoa did not participate in the 2024 presidential election because it is a U.S. territory and not a state, it participated in the U.S. presidential primaries and caucuses for both the Democratic and Republican parties.

== Democratic caucuses ==
The 2024 American Samoa Democratic presidential caucuses were held on March 5, 2024, as part of the Democratic Party primaries for the 2024 presidential election. 11 delegates to the 2024 Democratic National Convention will be allocated to presidential candidates. The contest was held on Super Tuesday alongside primaries in 14 other states and territories. It was initially reported by the American Samoa Democratic Party that Jason Palmer won four delegates, while Joe Biden won two. The same day, the delegate count was corrected, with Palmer and Biden winning three delegates each. Biden unexpectedly lost the popular vote to lesser-known candidate Palmer.

=== Declared candidates ===
- Joe Biden
- Dean Phillips
- Jason Palmer

=== Results ===
2024 American Samoa Democratic pres. caucus
Candidate	Votes	%	Delegates
Jason Palmer	51	56.04	3
Joe Biden (incumbent)	40	43.96	3
Dean Phillips	0	0.00	0
Total	91	100%	6

== Republican caucuses ==
The 2024 American Samoa Republican presidential caucuses were held on March 8, 2024, as part of the Republican Party primaries for the 2024 presidential election. 9 delegates to the 2024 Republican National Convention will be allocated on a delegate selection basis.

=== Declared candidates ===
- Donald Trump
- Nikki Haley (withdrawn)
- Asa Hutchinson (withdrawn)
- Vivek Ramaswamy (withdrawn)
- Ron DeSantis (withdrawn)
- Chris Christie (withdrawn)

=== Results ===
Donald Trump won the caucuses unanimously.

American Samoa Republican caucuses, March 5, 2024
Candidate	Votes	Percentage	Actual delegate count		
Candidate	Votes	Percentage	Bound	Unbound	Total
Donald Trump	110	100.00%	0	9	9
Total:	110	100.00%	0	9	9

== See also ==
- 2024 Republican Party presidential primaries
- 2024 Democratic Party presidential primaries
- 2024 United States presidential election
- 2024 United States elections
