= 2024 Republican Party presidential primaries =

- January 15 to June 4, 2024

2,429 delegates (2,272 pledged and 157 unpledged) to the Republican National Convention (Note: This delegate count is accurate as of January 2024. Delegate counts were subject to change based on the number of Republicans elected to the state legislatures, governorships, U.S. House, and U.S. Senate through December 31, 2023.) 1,215 delegate votes needed to win
- Opinion polls

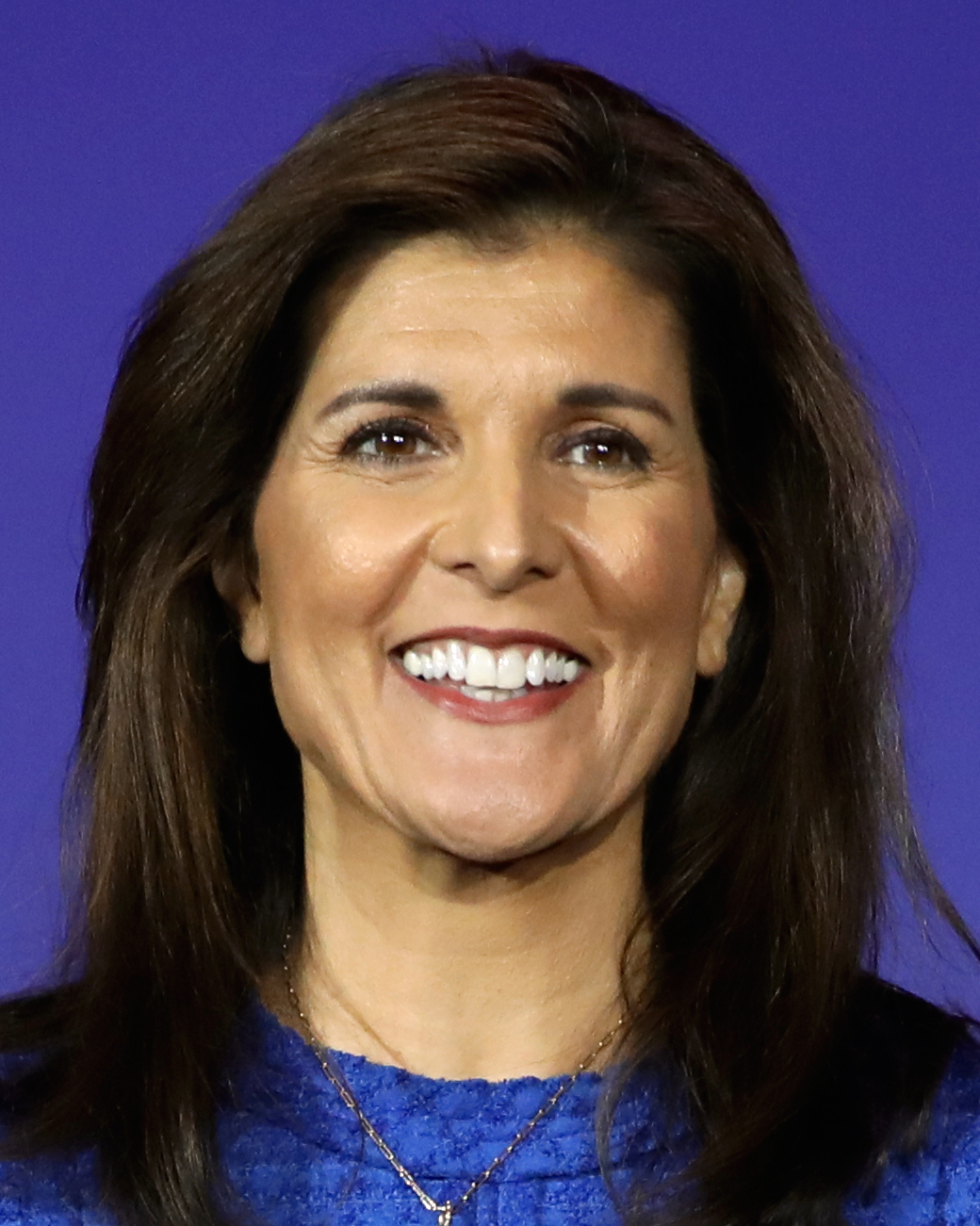
Candidate	Donald Trump	Nikki Haley
Home state	Florida	South Carolina
Delegate count	2,268	97 (Note: Haley would subsequently release her delegates in July, urging them to vote for Trump.)
Contests won	54	2 (Note: Haley also won the state-organized Nevada primary, though these results were ignored by the Republican Party in favor of a party-organized caucus.)
Popular vote	17,015,756 (Note: Write-in vote totals are excluded from the above election data reporting for the following states, and are added to the total number of votes for candidates for the purposes of candidate vote share calculations:)	4,381,799
Percentage	76.4% (Note: Percentage of votes accounts for write-ins included by The Green Papers as well as write-in votes not included in their tracking, which have been reported by Edison Research in Massachusetts, Illinois, Mississippi, Washington, Wisconsin, Pennsylvania, Rhode Island, and Nebraska. The total also excludes over/undervotes included in these totals)	19.7%
First place by pledged delegate allocation
Donald Trump
Nikki Haley
Previous Republican nominee
Donald Trump
Republican nominee
Donald Trump

Presidential primaries and caucuses of the Republican Party took place within 48 U.S. states, Washington, D.C., and five U.S. territories between January 15, 2024, and June 4, 2024. These elections selected most of the 2,429 delegates to be sent to the Republican National Convention. Former president Donald Trump was nominated as the republican nominee for the president of the United States for a third consecutive election cycle.

In 2023, a crowded field of candidates emerged, including Trump, Florida governor Ron DeSantis, former Ambassador to the United Nations Nikki Haley, and wealth management executive Vivek Ramaswamy. Trump maintained a consistent lead in primary polling since the 2020 election. Among non-Trump candidates, DeSantis initially polled in a close second behind Trump, but his polling numbers steadily declined throughout 2023. Ramaswamy experienced a small polling bump in mid-2023, but this proved to be brief. Haley's campaign began attracting greater attention in the final months of 2023, though neither she nor any other candidate came close to Trump in polling. The Republican primaries were referred to as a "race for second" due to Trump's consistent lead in polls.

At the January 15 Iowa caucuses, Trump posted a landslide victory, with DeSantis narrowly beating out Haley for second place and Ramaswamy in a distant fourth. Following the Iowa caucuses, Ramaswamy and DeSantis dropped out of the race and endorsed Trump, leaving Trump and Haley as the only remaining major candidates. Trump then defeated Haley in the January 23 New Hampshire primary, albeit by a smaller margin of victory than he achieved in Iowa; he defeated Haley again in the February 24 South Carolina primary, Haley's home state, a month later. After Trump's overwhelming victories nationwide on Super Tuesday, Haley suspended her campaign on March 6, having only won Vermont and Washington, D.C. Her victory in the Washington, D.C. primary on March 3, 2024, made her the first woman ever to win a Republican Party presidential primary contest. After March 6, 2024, Trump was the only major candidate remaining in the republican primaries.

Some Republicans expressed concerns about Trump's candidacy due to his loss in 2020, his alleged role in inciting the January 6 Capitol attack, ongoing criminal cases against him, and the results of the 2022 midterms in which several Trump-endorsed candidates lost key races; many others supported him and decried the investigations as politically motivated, and Trump maintained high favorability ratings among Republican voters. Trump's eligibility to appear on the ballot was challenged by some voters and political leaders in Colorado, Maine and Illinois; these efforts were rejected by the Supreme Court of the United States in a unanimous decision. Trump became the presumptive nominee on March 12, with his victory in the Washington primary bringing him over the 1,215 delegate threshold needed to clinch the nomination.

On July 15, 2024, Trump and his running mate, U.S. Senator from Ohio JD Vance, were officially nominated as the Republican presidential and vice presidential candidates at the Republican National Convention. Trump became the first person to be the Republican nominee in three consecutive elections, and the second three-time Republican nominee, after Richard Nixon (1960, 1968, 1972). The Trump-Vance ticket won the general election on November 5, defeating the Democratic Party ticket of incumbent Vice President Kamala Harris and her running mate, Minnesota governor Tim Walz.

== Results ==
Popular Vote

Republican primary results
Party	Candidate	Votes	%
Republican	Donald Trump	17,015,756	76.42%
Republican	Nikki Haley	4,381,799	19.68%
Republican	Ron DeSantis	353,615	1.59%
N/A	Uncommitted	154,815	0.70%
Republican	Chris Christie	139,541	0.63%
Republican	Vivek Ramaswamy	96,954	0.44%
Republican	Asa Hutchinson	22,044	0.10%
Republican	Perry Johnson	4,051	0.02%
Republican	Tim Scott	1,598	0.01%
Republican	Doug Burgum	502	0.00%
Republican	Mike Pence	404	0.00%
N/A	Other candidates	93,796	0.42%
Total votes		22,264,875	100.00%

Map legend
Nikki Haley
Donald Trump
Winner not yet declared
None of These Candidates

First-place winners of each state

== Candidates ==
During the 2024 election season, over 400 candidates filed with the Federal Election Commission (FEC) to run for the Republican presidential nomination.

=== Nominee ===
Republican nominee for the 2024 presidential election
Candidate	Born	Most recent position	Home state	Campaign Announcement date	Bound delegates (hard count; then floor)	Popular vote	Contests won	Running mate	Ref
Donald Trump	June 14, 1946 (age 78); Queens, New York	President of the United States (2017–2021)	Florida (Note: Trump's official state of residence was New York in the 2016 presidential election but later changed to Florida, when his permanent residence was switched from Trump Tower to Mar-a-Lago in 2019.)	Campaign November 15, 2022; FEC filing Website; Secured nomination: March 12, 2024	2,320 (95.5%) (floor 2,388)	17,015,756 (76.4%)	54; AK, AL, AR, AS, AZ, CA, CO, CT, DE, (Note: The Delaware Republican primary was cancelled and Trump was declared the winner after no other candidate filed) FL, GA, GU, HI, IA, ID, IL, IN, KS, KY, LA, MA, MD, ME, MI, MN, MO, MP, MS, MT, NC, ND, NE, NH, NJ, NM, NV, NY, OH, OK, OR, PA, PR, RI, SC, SD, (Note: The South Dakota Republican primary was cancelled and Trump was declared the winner after no other candidate filed.) TN, TX, UT, VA, VI, WA, WI, WV, WY	JD Vance	

=== Withdrew during the primaries ===
Major candidates who withdrew during the 2024 Republican Party presidential primaries
Candidate	Born	Most recent position	Home state	Campaign announced	Campaign suspended	Campaign	Bound delegates (hard count; then floor)	Contests won	Popular vote	Ref
Nikki Haley	January 20, 1972 (age 52); Bamberg, South Carolina	U.S. Ambassador to the United Nations (2017–2018)	South Carolina	February 14, 2023	March 6, 2024 (endorsed Trump)	Campaign FEC filing Website	97 (4.0%) (floor 41)	2 DC, VT	4,381,799 (19.7%)	
Ron DeSantis	September 14, 1978 (age 45); Jacksonville, Florida	Governor of Florida (2019–present)	Florida	May 24, 2023	January 21, 2024 (endorsed Trump)	Campaign FEC filing Website	9 (0.4%) (floor 0)	None	353,615 (1.6%)	
Asa Hutchinson	December 3, 1950 (age 73); Bentonville, Arkansas	Governor of Arkansas (2015–2023)	Arkansas	April 26, 2023	January 16, 2024 (endorsed Haley, then no endorsement)	Campaign FEC filing Website	0 (0.0%) (floor 0)	None	22,044 (0.1%)	
Vivek Ramaswamy	August 9, 1985 (age 38); Cincinnati, Ohio	Executive chairman of Strive Asset Management (2022–2023)	Ohio	February 21, 2023	January 15, 2024 (endorsed Trump)	Campaign FEC filing Website	3 (0.1%) (floor 0)	None	96,954 (0.4%)	

==== Other candidates ====
- Ryan Binkley, pastor and businessman from Texas (withdrew February 27, 2024; endorsed Trump)
- John Anthony Castro, tax consultant and perennial candidate from Texas
- E. W. Jackson, pastor and nominee for lieutenant governor of Virginia in 2013 (withdrew January 23, 2024; endorsed Trump)

=== Withdrew before the primaries ===
Major candidates who withdrew before the 2024 Republican Party presidential primaries
Candidate	Born	Most recent position	Home state	Campaign announced	Campaign suspended	Campaign	Bound delegates (hard count)	Popular vote	Ref.
Chris Christie	September 6, 1962 (age 61); Newark, New Jersey	Governor of New Jersey (2010–2018)	New Jersey	June 6, 2023	January 10, 2024	Campaign FEC filing Website	None	139,541 (0.6%)	
Doug Burgum	August 1, 1956 (age 67); Arthur, North Dakota	Governor of North Dakota (2016–2024)	North Dakota	June 7, 2023	December 4, 2023 (endorsed Trump)	Campaign FEC filing Website	None	502 (nil%)	
Tim Scott	September 19, 1965 (age 58); North Charleston, South Carolina	U.S. senator from South Carolina (2013–present)	South Carolina	May 19, 2023; Exploratory committee: April 12, 2023	November 12, 2023 (endorsed Trump)	Campaign FEC filing Website	None	1,598 (nil%)	
Mike Pence	June 7, 1959 (age 64); Columbus, Indiana	Vice President of the United States (2017–2021)	Indiana	June 5, 2023	October 28, 2023	Campaign FEC filing Website	None	404 (nil%)	
Larry Elder	April 27, 1952 (age 71); Los Angeles, California	Host of The Larry Elder Show (1993–2022)	California	April 20, 2023	October 26, 2023 (endorsed Trump)	Campaign FEC filing Website	None		
Perry Johnson	January 23, 1948 (age 75); Dolton, Illinois	Founder of Perry Johnson Registrars, Inc. (1994–present)	Michigan	March 2, 2023	October 20, 2023 (endorsed Trump)	Campaign FEC filing Website	None	4,051 (nil%)	
Will Hurd	August 19, 1977 (age 46); San Antonio, Texas	U.S. Representative from TX-23 (2015–2021)	Texas	June 22, 2023	October 9, 2023 (endorsed Haley, then no endorsement)	Campaign FEC filing Website	None		
Francis Suarez	October 6, 1977 (age 45); Miami, Florida	Mayor of Miami (2017–2025)	Florida	June 14, 2023	August 29, 2023 (endorsed Trump)	Campaign FEC filing Website (Note: Archived August 23, 2023, at the Wayback Machine)	None		

==== Other candidates ====
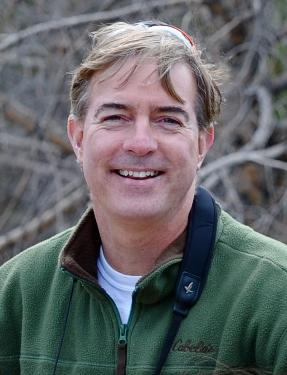
Steve Laffey, mayor of Cranston, Rhode Island (2003–2007) and COO of Raymond James Morgan Keegan (2000–2001) (withdrew October 6, 2023)

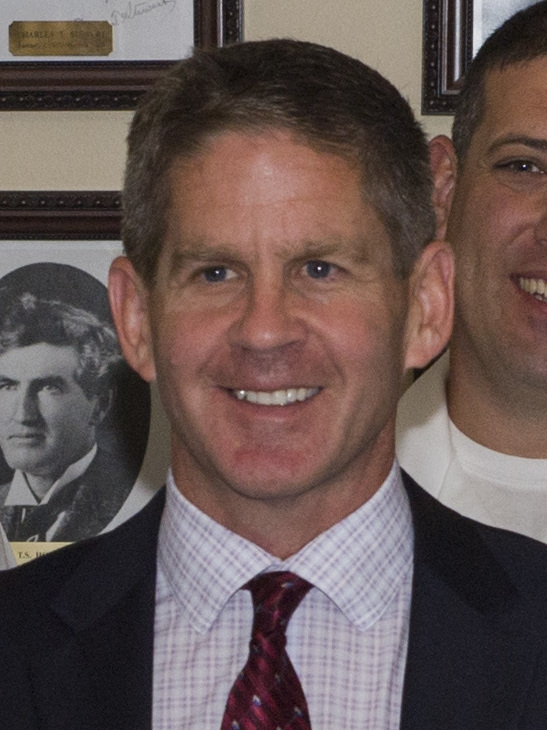
Corey Stapleton, Secretary of State of Montana (2017–2021) and Montana State Senator (2001–2009) (withdrew October 13, 2023)

== Timeline ==
=== 2022 ===
==== November 2022 ====
A week after the 2022 midterm elections, former president Donald Trump announced at Mar-a-Lago that he would run again for the presidency in 2024. Trump was the first former president to run for president after leaving office since Herbert Hoover did so in 1940. When he won the Republican nomination, he became the first Republican to be nominated for president three separate times since Richard Nixon (Republican nominee in 1960, 1968, and 1972). After winning the general election, Trump became the only president other than Grover Cleveland to serve two non-consecutive terms.

=== 2023 ===
==== February 2023 ====
On February 14, former South Carolina governor and former U.N. ambassador Nikki Haley released a video announcing her presidential candidacy.

On February 21, businessman Vivek Ramaswamy announced his presidential candidacy on Tucker Carlson Tonight.

==== March 2023 ====
On March 2, businessman Perry Johnson, who had been deemed ineligible to appear on the Republican primary ballot in the 2022 Michigan gubernatorial election due to allegedly fraudulent signatures, announced his intent to run for president in 2024.

==== April 2023 ====
On April 2, former Arkansas governor Asa Hutchinson announced his candidacy during an interview with ABC News' Jonathan Karl. On April 6, Hutchinson filed candidate paperwork with the Federal Election Commission.

On April 12, Sen. Tim Scott of South Carolina announced an exploratory committee to run for president.

On April 20, radio host and former California gubernatorial candidate Larry Elder announced his campaign on Tucker Carlson Tonight.

==== May 2023 ====
On May 19, Tim Scott submitted FEC paperwork to run. He announced his presidential run publicly on May 22.

On May 24, Florida governor and former U.S. representative Ron DeSantis submitted his FEC paperwork to run, and announced that he was running for president during a Twitter Spaces interview with Twitter owner Elon Musk.

==== June 2023 ====
On June 5, former Vice President Mike Pence filed paperwork to run for president and North Dakota governor Doug Burgum released a campaign video. Pence's candidacy made him the first vice president to run against the president under whom he served since John Nance Garner in 1940.

On June 6, Burgum published an announcement opinion-editorial piece announcing his presidential run in The Wall Street Journal, making him the first person born in North Dakota to seek a major party's president nomination. (Note: The first North Dakotan to run for president was U.S. Representative William Lemke who ran as the Union Party's nominee in 1936, but Lemke was not born in the state. The first person born in the state to run for president was Gary Johnson who ran as the Libertarian Party's nominee in 2012 and 2016; Johnson briefly sought the Republican nomination in 2012.) The same day, former New Jersey governor and 2016 presidential candidate Chris Christie publicly announced a presidential campaign in New Hampshire.

On June 7, Pence publicly announced his bid with a campaign video. Also, Burgum delivered a public announcement speech in Fargo.

On June 14, Miami mayor Francis Suarez filed his run with the Federal Election Commission. He delivered a speech the next day at the Ronald Reagan Presidential Library to publicly announce his campaign, as four other Republicans in the race had done in the last year.

On June 22, former CIA agent and representative of Texas Will Hurd launched a run, after previously expressing interest in launching a presidential bid.

==== August 2023 ====
On August 1, Donald Trump was indicted a third time for trying to overturn the results of the 2020 presidential election.

On August 14, Donald Trump was indicted a fourth time for trying to overturn the results of the 2020 presidential election in the state of Georgia.

On August 21, the slate of candidates that officially qualified for the debate was released: Doug Burgum, Chris Christie, Ron DeSantis, Nikki Haley, Asa Hutchinson, Mike Pence, Vivek Ramaswamy, and Tim Scott.

On August 23, the first Republican candidates debate took place in Milwaukee, broadcast by Fox News. To be eligible for this debate, a candidate must have polled at least one percent, received donations from 40,000 individuals, and signed a loyalty pledge to back whoever ultimately wins the party presidential nomination. Candidates deemed eligible for the debate were Doug Burgum, Chris Christie, Ron DeSantis, Nikki Haley, Asa Hutchinson, Mike Pence, Vivek Ramaswamy and Tim Scott. Trump did not participate in the debate, instead filming an interview with Tucker Carlson that was released minutes before the debate was scheduled to begin.

On August 29, Francis Suarez suspended his presidential campaign, becoming the first major candidate to do so.

==== September 2023 ====
On September 18, Donald Trump's campaign announced that he would be giving a speech in Detroit before striking United Auto Workers union members at the same time as the second debate in California. United Auto Workers president Shawn Fain pointed out that Trump's speech was being held at a non-union plant whose workers were not connected to the strike.

The requirements to attend the second debate were to be polling at three percent in at least three reputable national polls, while the donor requirement increased to 50,000 unique donations. As of September 26, the slate of candidates that qualified for the second debate and would attend included: Ron DeSantis, Nikki Haley, Tim Scott, Vivek Ramaswamy, Mike Pence, Chris Christie, and Doug Burgum. Asa Hutchinson, who appeared for the first debate, did not qualify.

On September 27, the second Republican presidential debate took place at the Ronald Reagan Presidential Library in Simi Valley, California.

==== October 2023 ====
On October 2, the Supreme Court of the United States declined to hear John Anthony Castro's case to disqualify Donald Trump from appearing on the ballot.

On October 9, former Representative Will Hurd withdrew from the race.

On October 17, judge for the United States District Court for the District of Columbia, Tanya S. Chutkan, issued a gag order on Donald Trump from targeting prosecutors, court staff or "any reasonably foreseeable witness" marking the first time in U.S. history where the speech of a presidential candidate was limited by the courts.

On October 20, businessman Perry Johnson suspended his campaign. Judge Chutkan lifted the gag order on Donald Trump to allow Trump's legal team to appeal the order.

On October 26, former talk radio show host Larry Elder suspended his campaign and endorsed Trump.

On October 28, former Vice President of the United States Mike Pence suspended his campaign.

On October 30, Judge Chutkan reinstated the gag order on Donald Trump.

==== November 2023 ====
On November 3, the United States Court of Appeals for the District of Columbia Circuit lifted the gag order on Donald Trump until at least November 20, when oral arguments for or against the gag order would be heard by a three judge panel.

On November 6, the RNC announced that the following candidates qualified for the third presidential debate; Donald Trump, Ron DeSantis, Nikki Haley, Vivek Ramaswamy, Chris Christie and Tim Scott. The criteria to qualify for the third debate were having more than 70,000 unique donations and polling at 4% or better in national polls and local polls in Iowa or New Hampshire.

On November 8, the third Republican presidential debate took place in Miami, Florida. Donald Trump did not participate.

On November 12, Tim Scott, U.S. Senator from South Carolina, dropped out of the race.

On November 20, the United States Court of Appeals for the District of Columbia Circuit reached a compromise between Trump and Chutkan, issuing a narrow gag order preventing Trump from "insulting" prosecutors, court personnel and potential witnesses, but allowing him to speak freely about outside counsel and issues relating to his presidential campaign.

On November 30, DeSantis debated Democratic California Governor Gavin Newsom.

==== December 2023 ====
On December 4, Governor of North Dakota Doug Burgum announced his withdrawal from the race.

On December 6, the fourth Republican presidential debate took place at the University of Alabama in Tuscaloosa. Christie, DeSantis, Haley, Ramaswamy and Trump all met the donor and polling criteria. Trump again skipped the event.

On December 19, 2023, after a 4–3 ruling by the Colorado Supreme Court, Colorado became the first to disqualify former President Donald Trump from its primary ballot under Section 3 of the 14th Amendment. Trump remained on the ballot pending an appeal. The Colorado Republican Party is considering holding a caucus in place of the state-sanctioned primary if the decision stands.

On December 22, CBS reported that Donald Trump was inquiring within his campaign and with his allies over the possibility of tapping Nikki Haley for his running mate. This came shortly after a poll which showed Haley in second place in Iowa with 29% to Trump's 44%. In response, senior members of the Trump circle, including Donald Trump Jr., Roger Stone, and Tucker Carlson, all rejected the idea.

On December 28, Maine followed Colorado in prohibiting former President Trump from appearing on its ballots, though it was stayed pending an appeal.

On December 29, an effort in Virginia to prohibit former President Trump from appearing on their ballots by two social justice activists, Roy Perry-Bey and Carlos Howard, was dismissed by Leonie Brinkema, judge of the United States District Court for the Eastern District of Virginia, due to the pair lacking standing to sue Trump under Virginia law.

=== 2024 ===
==== January 2024 ====
On January 5, the Supreme Court agreed to hear Trump's appeal of his removal from the Colorado ballot.

On January 9, Gloria Navarro, judge for the United States District Court for the District of Nevada, rejected an effort in Nevada to block former President Trump from appearing on the state's ballots by John Anthony Castro. Navarro stated that Castro, a resident of Texas who cited the 14th Amendment in the case, does not have the standing to sue Trump under Nevada law. The point was largely moot, as the lawsuit would have barred Trump from appearing on the Nevada primary. Trump and the Nevada Republican Party had boycotted the state-organized primary in favor of a GOP-organized caucus.

On January 10, former New Jersey governor Chris Christie withdrew from the race. The fifth Republican presidential debate was held at Drake University in Des Moines, hosted by CNN. The requirements to attend were: finishing in the top three in local polls in Iowa, and be polling at at least 10% in both national and local polls. The three candidates that qualified were Trump, Haley, and DeSantis. Trump again did not participate, leaving the debate solely between Haley and DeSantis. Continuing his counterprogramming strategy, Trump instead appeared at a town hall with Fox News. Ramaswamy hosted a podcast interview with podcaster Tim Pool and Candace Owens after not qualifying for the debate.

On January 14, North Dakota governor and withdrawn candidate Doug Burgum endorsed Trump for president.

On January 15, Trump won the Iowa caucuses. In the Iowa Republican caucuses Trump won 20 delegates, DeSantis won 9 delegates, Haley won 8 delegates, and Ramaswamy won 3 delegates. Following the caucuses, businessman Vivek Ramaswamy withdrew from the race and endorsed Trump.

On January 16, former Arkansas governor Asa Hutchinson suspended his campaign. Later that same day, ABC announced it was canceling its debate scheduled for January 18, citing the fact that both Haley and Trump refused to attend.

On January 17, the seventh Republican presidential debate that was to be held at St. Anselm College in Goffstown, New Hampshire on January 21, was cancelled by CNN.

On January 21, Florida governor Ron DeSantis suspended his campaign and endorsed Trump. The departure of DeSantis left Trump and Haley as the only remaining major candidates for the Republican presidential nomination.

On January 23, Trump won the New Hampshire primary, defeating Haley by a margin of 54.3%-43.3%. Trump received 13 delegates and Haley received 9 delegates in the New Hampshire primary.

On January 30, Robert F. Kennedy Jr. stated that Trump had reached out to him in April 2023 about becoming his vice president pick. Kennedy indicated that he was flattered, but that he had refused Trump's offer. In response, a senior Trump advisor, Chris LaCivita, denied the exchange ever took place.

==== February 2024 ====
During a February 4 an interview with Fox News, Trump outlined a list of criteria his running mate would have to meet and mentioned Tim Scott and Kristi Noem as two examples of potential running mates.

On February 6, the Nevada primary took place. The primary was boycotted by the Nevada Republican Party in favor of the Nevada caucuses. As a consequence, Trump was not a candidate in the primary, while Haley was not in the caucus. Haley, while losing the primary to None of These Candidates, was declared the official winner.

On February 8, Trump won the Nevada and Virgin Island caucuses.

On February 24, Trump won the South Carolina primary. In the South Carolina primary, Trump secured forty seven delegates and Haley grabbed three delegates from South Carolina's 1st Congressional District.

On February 27, Trump won the Michigan primary.

==== March 2024 ====
On March 2, Trump won the Missouri, Michigan and Idaho caucuses. In Michigan Trump received 51 delegates and Nikki Haley received 4 delegates. No delegates were allocated at the Missouri caucuses and delegates will not be bound until April or May.

On March 3, Haley won the District of Columbia primary which was held starting from March 1. She won all 19 delegates at stake.

On March 4, efforts by some states (Colorado, Maine, and Illinois) to have Donald Trump removed from their ballots were declared unconstitutional by the United States Supreme Court in a unanimous 9–0 decision. Additionally, Trump won the North Dakota caucuses.

On March 5, Super Tuesday took place, with Trump winning the Alabama, Alaska, Arkansas, California, Colorado, Maine, Massachusetts, Minnesota, North Carolina, Oklahoma, Tennessee, Texas, and Virginia primaries, alongside the Utah caucuses, while Haley won the Vermont primary. Out of the 865 GOP pledged delegates that were up for grabs on Super Tuesday, Trump won 812 and Haley won 52.

On March 6, Haley suspended her campaign.

On March 8, Trump won the American Samoa caucuses.

On March 12, Trump won the Georgia, Mississippi, and Washington primaries and the Hawaii caucuses. Trump's win in Washington gave him enough delegates to clinch the nomination.

On March 15, Trump won the Northern Mariana Islands caucuses.

On March 16, Trump won the Guam caucuses.

On March 19, Trump won the Arizona, Florida, Illinois, Kansas, and Ohio primaries.

On March 23, Trump won the Louisiana primary.

==== April 2024 ====
On April 2, Trump won the Connecticut, New York, Rhode Island and Wisconsin primaries.

On April 20, Trump won the Wyoming caucuses.

On April 21, Trump won the Puerto Rico primary.

On April 23, Trump won the Pennsylvania primary.

==== May 2024 ====
On May 7, Trump won the Indiana primary.

On May 14, Trump won the Maryland, Nebraska, and West Virginia primaries.

On May 21, Trump won the Kentucky caucuses and Oregon primary.

==== June 2024 ====
On June 4, Trump won the Montana, New Jersey and the New Mexico primaries. The South Dakota primary was cancelled.

==== July 2024 ====
In July 2024, it was reported that Missouri Republicans clashed over their presidential delegate selections, after 27 delegates elected in May were removed from the list. On July 6, the executive committee of the Missouri Republican Party appointed 27 at-large delegates and 26 alternates to replace these delegates.

On July 9, Haley released her delegates, urging them to support Trump.

On July 13, Trump was shot at a rally in Butler, Pennsylvania in a failed assassination attempt.

On July 15, Trump was officially nominated at the Republican National Convention, and selected Senator JD Vance as his running mate.

=== Eligibility ===
Trump's eligibility to run for president had been disputed. On December 19, 2023, the Colorado Supreme Court ruled in Anderson v. Griswold that he was ineligible under Section 3 of the 14th Amendment due to his role in the January 6, 2021, United States Capitol attack. On December 28, 2023, Maine Secretary of State Shenna Bellows ruled that Trump was ineligible, also citing section 3 of the 14th Amendment. However, Bellows stayed her own ruling pending the results of a challenge in court. On February 28, a Cook County judge, Tracie Porter, ordered the removal of Trump from the ballot in Illinois, also citing Section 3 of the 14th Amendment.

On March 4, 2024, the Supreme Court of the United States issued a unanimous 9–0 ruling that the efforts by the Colorado Supreme Court, under orders of the Colorado Attorney general, to have Trump barred from the ballot, were unconstitutional as that decision can only be made by the United States Congress, and that Trump must be reinstated on the ballot.

=== Overview ===
Active campaign	Exploratory committee	Withdrawn candidate	Republican National Convention
Midterm elections	Debates	Primaries	Republican National Convention

== Debates ==
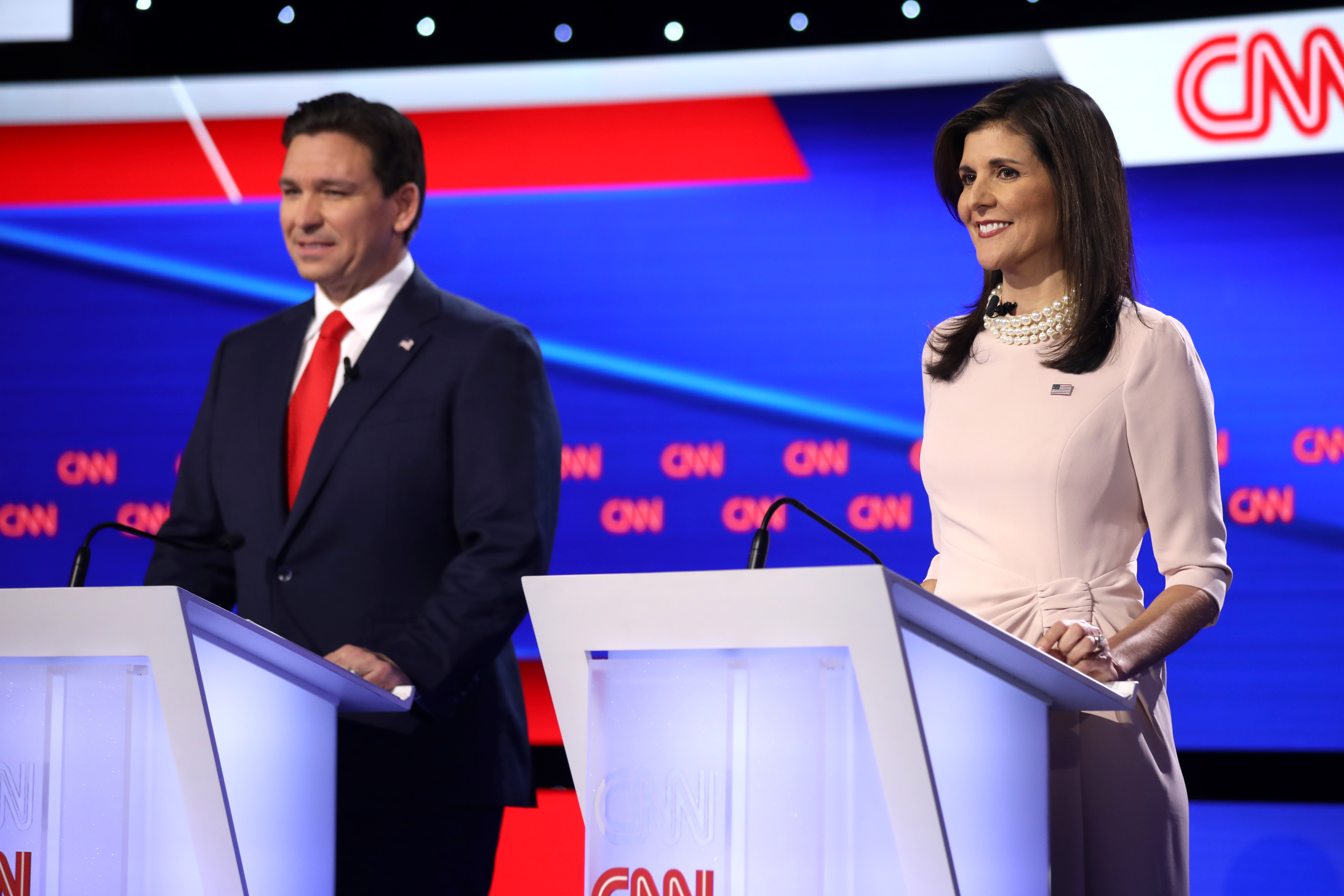
Ron DeSantis and Nikki Haley at the CNN Republican Presidential Debate in Des Moines, Iowa.

The first Republican debate was held on August 23, 2023, hosted by Fox News and moderated by Bret Baier and Martha MacCallum. To be eligible for the debate, a candidate must have polled with at least 1% of voter support, received donations from 40,000 individuals, and signed a loyalty pledge to back whoever ultimately wins the party presidential nomination. Doug Burgum, Chris Christie, Ron DeSantis, Nikki Haley, Asa Hutchinson, Mike Pence, Vivek Ramaswamy, and Tim Scott all qualified for the first debate. Donald Trump gave an interview with Tucker Carlson during the same time slot.

The second Republican debate was held on September 27, in Simi Valley, California, at the Ronald Reagan Presidential Library. The requirements were similar to the first debate, but increased the number of individual donors required to 50,000 and required the candidates to poll at or above three percent in two national polls or in one national poll and two "early state" polls. Seven candidates were invited to the second debate: Burgum, Christie, DeSantis, Haley, Pence, Ramaswamy, and Scott.

The third debate was held in Miami, Florida, on November 8. The donor threshold for the third debate increases to 70,000 unique donors, including 200 donors in 20 or more states, while the polling threshold increases to four percent in two national polls or four percent in one national poll and four percent in two statewide polls in Iowa, New Hampshire, Nevada, or South Carolina. Christie, DeSantis, Haley, Ramaswamy, and Scott qualified for the third debate.

A fourth debate was held in Tuscaloosa, Alabama, on December 6. The donor threshold increased to 80,000 unique donors, while the polling threshold increased to six percent in two national polls, or six percent in one national poll and six percent in two polls from different states among Iowa, New Hampshire, Nevada, or South Carolina. DeSantis, Ramaswamy, Haley and Christie qualified for this debate.

The fifth debate took place in Des Moines, Iowa on January 10, 2024, and was hosted by CNN and moderated by Jake Tapper and Dana Bash. Additionally, a scheduled sixth debate, meant to occur on January 18, 2024, in Goffstown, New Hampshire, hosted by ABC, was cancelled two days prior.

== Opinion polling ==
Local regression graph of all polls conducted since January 2023.

== Maps ==
Counties won by each candidate.
Trump
Haley
No primary or data

Popular vote by county for each candidate.

2024 Republican Party presidential primaries, rules
Open primary
Semi-closed primary
Closed primary
Canceled

== Campaign finance ==
This is an overview of the money used by each campaign as it is reported to the Federal Election Commission (FEC). Totals raised include individual contributions, loans from the candidate, and transfers from other campaign committees. Individual contributions are itemized (catalogued) by the FEC when the total value of contributions by an individual comes to more than $200. The last column, Cash On Hand, shows the remaining cash each campaign had available for its future spending as of December 31, 2023. Campaign finance reports for the first quarter of 2024 will become available on April 15, 2024.

This table does not include contributions made to Super PACs or party committees supporting the candidate. Each value is rounded up to the nearest dollar.

Candidate who withdrew prior to December 31
Candidate who withdrew following December 31

Overview of campaign financing for candidates in the 2024 Republican Party presidential primariesthrough December 31, 2023
Candidate	Total raised	Total raised since last quarter	Individual contributions			Debt	Spent	Spent since last quarter	Cash on hand
Candidate	Total raised	Total raised since last quarter	Total	Unitemized	Pct	Debt	Spent	Spent since last quarter	Cash on hand
Trump	$79,634,357	$19,111,279	$431,696	$178,977	41.5%	$99,329	$46,546,415	$23,565,298	$33,087,942
Haley	$36,026,184	$17,316,948	$28,792,841	$6,795,202	23.6%	$0	$21,469,303	$14,311,759	$14,556,882
Christie	$7,330,905	$1,891,871	$7,296,867	$2,138,024	29.3%	$0	$5,021,353	$3,497,538	$2,309,552
DeSantis	$38,361,550	$6,714,088	$32,490,189	$6,781,494	20.9%	$26,167	$28,625,199	$9,304,642	$9,736,351
Hutchinson	$1,510,718	$261,415	$1,295,318	$496,396	38.3%	$57,271	$1,430,201	$506,186	$80,516
Ramaswamy	$37,055,746	$10,446,566	$11,450,460	$5,126,038	44.8%	$23,750,000	$35,566,297	$13,204,994	$1,489,448
Burgum	$17,882,365	$2,702,700	$3,087,845	$689,129	22.3%	$13,970,653	$17,805,576	$4,948,486	$76,789
Elder	$1,375,322	$−62,823	$1,346,445	$918,078	68.2%	$149,396	$1,372,426	$178,982	$2,696
Hurd	$1,451,431	$−1,107	$1,447,586	$735,367	50.8%	$15,479	$1,424,502	$195,038	$26,929
Johnson	$14,570,449	$972	$148,692	$0	0%	$0	$13,632,192	$227,917	$−11,533,150
Pence	$5,109,979	$584,250	$5,023,544	$2,097,236	41.7%	$1,498,131	$4,408,468	$1,064,191	$701,511
Scott	$14,492,592	$1,444,044	$12,224,139	$4,241,714	34.7%	$0	$30,309,565	$8,396,863	$6,337,306 (Note: Scott's principal campaign committee, Tim Scott for America, was also used for his earlier congressional campaigns. Some of these figures, therefore, include money left over from those previous candidacies.)
Suarez	$1,794,895	$369,378	$1,422,005	$125,686	8.8%	$30,000	$1,771,641	$406,516	$23,255

== Primaries and caucus calendar ==
Caucuses and primaries in the 2024 Republican Party presidential primaries
Date	Total delegates		Primary/Caucus
January 15	40		Iowa caucuses
January 23	22		New Hampshire primary
February 6	0		Nevada primary (Note: The state-organized primary was boycotted by the Nevada Republican Party and its results ignored in favor of the party-organized caucus two days later.)
February 8	30	26	Nevada caucus
February 8	30	4 (Note: The U.S. Virgin Islands delegates were reduced from 9 to 4 for scheduling a caucus before March 15 that used a ranked-choice voting scheme instead of a proportional system.)	Virgin Islands caucus
February 24	50		South Carolina primary
February 27	16		Michigan primary
March 2	125	32	Idaho caucuses
March 2	125	39	Michigan caucuses
March 2	125	54	Missouri caucuses
March 1–3	19		District of Columbia primary
March 4	29		North Dakota caucuses
March 5 (Super Tuesday)	865	50	Alabama primary
March 5 (Super Tuesday)	865	29	Alaska primary
March 5 (Super Tuesday)	865	40	Arkansas primary
March 5 (Super Tuesday)	865	169	California primary
March 5 (Super Tuesday)	865	37	Colorado primary
March 5 (Super Tuesday)	865	20	Maine primary
March 5 (Super Tuesday)	865	40	Massachusetts primary
March 5 (Super Tuesday)	865	39	Minnesota primary
March 5 (Super Tuesday)	865	74	North Carolina primary
March 5 (Super Tuesday)	865	43	Oklahoma primary
March 5 (Super Tuesday)	865	58	Tennessee primary
March 5 (Super Tuesday)	865	161	Texas primary
March 5 (Super Tuesday)	865	40	Utah caucuses
March 5 (Super Tuesday)	865	17	Vermont primary
March 5 (Super Tuesday)	865	48	Virginia primary
March 8	9		American Samoa caucuses
March 12	161	59	Georgia primary
March 12	161	19	Hawaii caucuses
March 12	161	40	Mississippi primary
March 12	161	43	Washington primary
March 15	9		Northern Marianas caucuses
March 16	9		Guam caucuses
March 19	350	43	Arizona primary
March 19	350	125	Florida primary
March 19	350	64	Illinois primary
March 19	350	39	Kansas primary
March 19	350	79	Ohio primary
March 23	47		Louisiana primary
April 2	179	28	Connecticut primary
April 2	179	91	New York primary
April 2	179	19	Rhode Island primary
April 2	179	41	Wisconsin primary
April 18–20	29		Wyoming caucuses
April 21	23		Puerto Rico primary
April 23	67		Pennsylvania primary
May 7	58		Indiana primary
May 14	105	37	Maryland primary
May 14	105	36	Nebraska primary
May 14	105	32	West Virginia primary
May 21	77	46	Kentucky caucuses
May 21	77	31	Oregon primary
June 4	62	31	Montana primary
June 4	62	12 (Note: New Jersey was penalized for scheduling its primary after May 31 without a waiver.)	New Jersey primary
June 4	62	22	New Mexico primary
Cancelled	45	16	Delaware primary
Cancelled	45	29	South Dakota primary

=== Timing ===
Republican Party rules mandate that changes to all contest dates must occur by September 2023, and there appears to be a trend of contests being scheduled earlier than usual. They specify that all must occur between March and June 11, 2024 – except for Iowa, New Hampshire, Nevada, and South Carolina – which are allowed to hold contests in February. Iowa chose to hold its caucus the earliest in over a decade, on a federal holiday – January 15 – as the rules are not legally binding.

==== Nevada controversy ====
After the 2020 presidential election, the Democratic-controlled Nevada Legislature moved to establish a presidential primary for the Republican and Democratic parties. Previously, party-organized caucuses were used in Nevada to determine delegates in presidential elections.

In May 2023, the Nevada Republican Party sued the state of Nevada in an effort to continue the use of caucuses as the means to determine its delegate allocation. The Nevada Attorney General's office stated that the Nevada Republican Party was allowed to choose between a primary or caucus, since the primary is non-binding and because state law does not mandate specific rules governing how political parties are to choose its candidate for president.

On August 14, 2023, the Nevada Republican Party announced it would hold its caucuses on February 8, while the February 6 state primary would not be binding.

==== Michigan controversy ====
The Michigan primaries were originally scheduled to be held in March in accordance with Republican Party rules. Democrats, who were in control of the Michigan legislature and governorship after the 2022 midterm elections, moved up both primaries as part of their own 2024 presidential delegate selection plan. As a result, the earlier date of February 27 violates Republican rules – which state that only Iowa, New Hampshire, Nevada and South Carolina can vote earlier than March 1, 2024.

Republicans in Michigan have criticized Democrats in Michigan for their unilateral move. Eventually, the Republicans held a primary on February 27 and a caucus on March 2.

=== Delegates ===
There was an estimated total of 2,467 delegates to the 2024 Republican National Convention. In contests until March 15, delegates were awarded on a proportional basis, either by percentage of statewide vote or share of congressional districts won. Some states established thresholds between 4 and 20% for proportionality to trigger, under which a candidate receives no delegates. A vast majority, 41 contests totaling 1,920 delegates, operate this way: using methods that are hybrid between proportionality and majority-take-all. New York, for example, has a 20% threshold for proportionality but a candidate winning a majority takes all delegates.

The delegates of North Dakota, Wyoming, American Samoa, Guam, and the Virgin Islands, along with 51 of Pennsylvania's 67, were unpledged (free to vote for anyone at the convention), totaling 119. Florida, New Jersey, Ohio, Colorado, Arizona, Nebraska, South Dakota, and Montana's delegates were strictly awarded on a plurality-take-all basis, totaling 428.

By Super Tuesday, over 40% of delegates were awarded, and most by March 19. Republican Party rules mandated changes to delegate allocation methods happen by September 30. The primaries concluded with a final vote on the nominee by a majority of delegates, at the newly elected Republican National Convention in Milwaukee, which was held July 15–18.

According to the rules of the Republican Party, no candidate could have their name placed into nomination, thereby earning television airtime at the Republican National Convention, unless he or she received a plurality of delegates in at least five states (the rules state that "'state' or 'states' shall be taken to include American Samoa, the District of Columbia, Guam, the Northern Mariana Islands, Puerto Rico, and the Virgin Islands").

== See also ==
- 2024 Republican National Convention
- 2024 Democratic Party presidential primaries
- 2024 Democratic National Convention
