= 2024 Rhode Island Republican presidential primary =

- April 2, 2024

19 Republican National Convention delegates

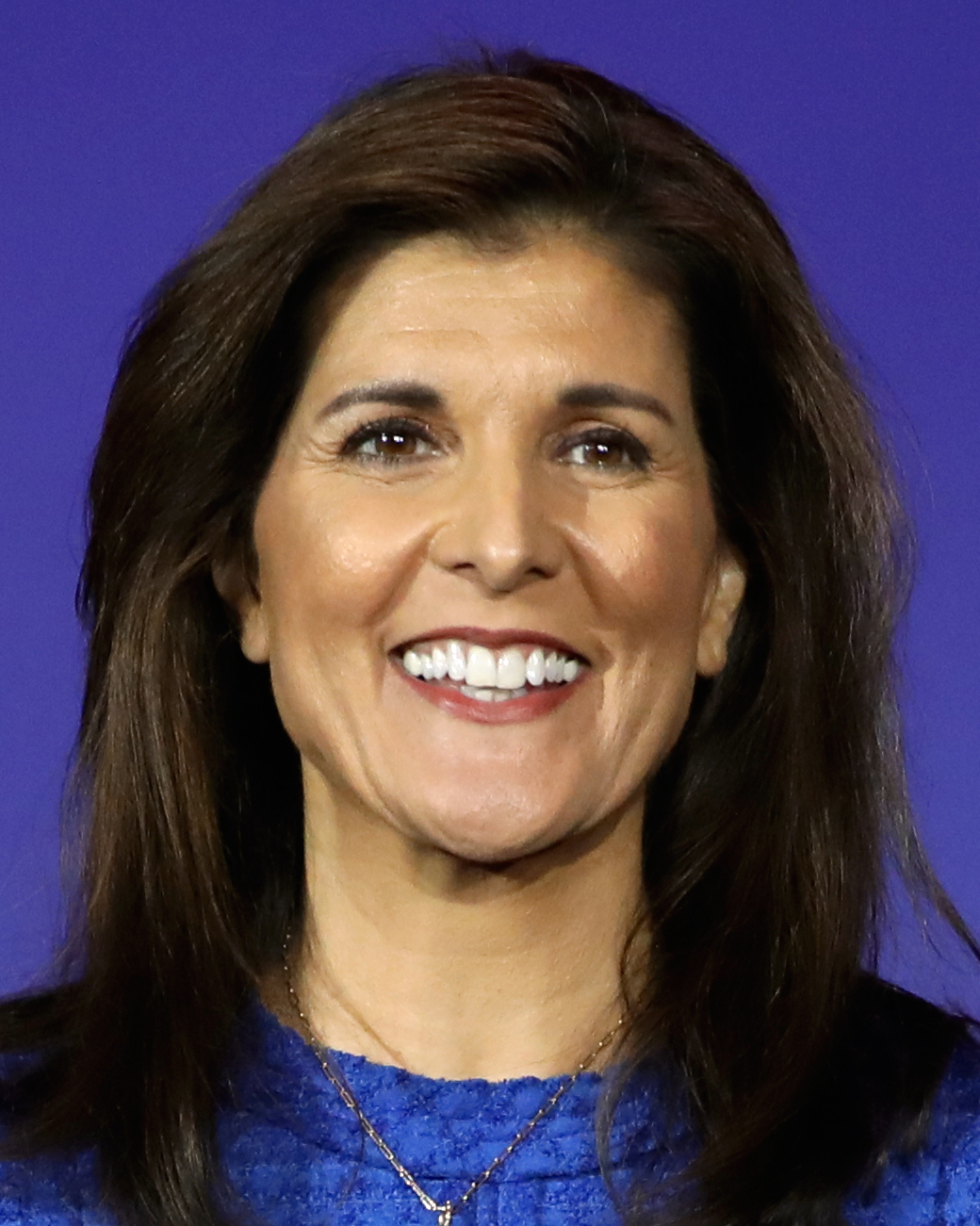
Candidate	Donald Trump	Nikki Haley (withdrawn)
Home state	Florida	South Carolina
Delegate count	17	2
Popular vote	10,898	1,371
Percentage	84.5%	10.6%

Trump
60 – 70%
70 – 80%
80 – 90%
>90%

The 2024 Rhode Island Republican presidential primary was held on April 2, 2024, as part of the Republican Party primaries for the 2024 presidential election. 19 delegates to the 2024 Republican National Convention were allocated on a winner-take-most basis. The contest was held alongside primaries in Delaware, New York, and Wisconsin.

Even though Trump cruised to victory, he showed a poorer result as compared to his performance in 2020 (albeit as a non-incumbent), getting almost 3% fewer votes. Conversely, Nikki Haley crossed the 10% threshold, recording her best results in the suburban town of Barrington, which Donald Trump lost in the 2016 primary and the island town of New Shoreham.

== Polling ==
Poll source	Date(s) administered	Sample size (Note: Key: A – all adults RV – registered voters LV – likely voters V – unclear)	Margin of error	Ron DeSantis	Donald Trump	Other
Echelon Insights	Aug 31 – Sep 7, 2022	102 (LV)	± 6.1%	38%	54%	8%

== Results ==
Swing for Trump by municipality: +0% to +5% -0% to -5% -5% to -10% -10% to -15% -15% to -20% -20% or more

Trump swept through every county and municipality in the state, but lost ground in comparison to his 2020 performance. Having officially run unopposed both times, he recorded poorer results in 2024 in all but two towns.

Rhode Island Republican primary, April 2, 2024
Candidate	Votes	Percentage	Actual delegate count		
Candidate	Votes	Percentage	Bound	Unbound	Total
Donald Trump	10,898	84.5%	17		17
Nikki Haley (withdrawn)	1,371	10.6%	2		2
Uncommitted	257	2.0%			
Ron DeSantis (withdrawn)	178	1.4%			
Chris Christie (withdrawn)	154	1.2%			
Vivek Ramaswamy (withdrawn)	40	0.3%			
Total:	12,898	100.0%	19		19

== See also ==
- 2024 Republican Party presidential primaries
- 2024 United States presidential election
- 2024 United States presidential election in Rhode Island
- 2024 United States elections
