= 2024 U.S. Virgin Islands Democratic presidential caucuses =

- June 8, 2024

13 delegates (7 pledged and 6 unpledged) to the Democratic National Convention
Candidate	Joe Biden
Home state	Delaware
Delegate count	7
Popular vote	467
Percentage	100%

The 2024 U.S. Virgin Islands Democratic presidential caucuses was held on June 8, 2024, as part of the Democratic Party primaries for the 2024 presidential election. 13 delegates to the Democratic National Convention were allocated to presidential candidates.

Incumbent President Joe Biden announced on April 25, 2023, his bid for a second term.

This was the last contest to take place during the 2024 Democratic primaries. This was the third primary or caucus for the Democratic nomination to feature one candidate since the Alaska caucuses and Indiana primary.

== Results ==
United States Virgin Islands Democratic primary, June 8, 2024
Candidate	Votes	Percentage	Actual delegate count		
Candidate	Votes	Percentage	Pledged	Unpledged	Total
Joe Biden (incumbent)	467	100.0%	7		7
Uncommitted	0	0.0%			
Marianne Williamson	0	0.0%			
Total:	467	100.0%	7	6	13

== See also ==
- 2024 U.S. Virgin Islands Republican presidential caucuses
- 2024 Democratic Party presidential primaries
- 2024 United States presidential election
- 2024 United States elections
