= 2024 Idaho Democratic presidential caucuses =

- May 23, 2024

27 delegates (23 pledged, 4 unpledged) to the Democratic National Convention

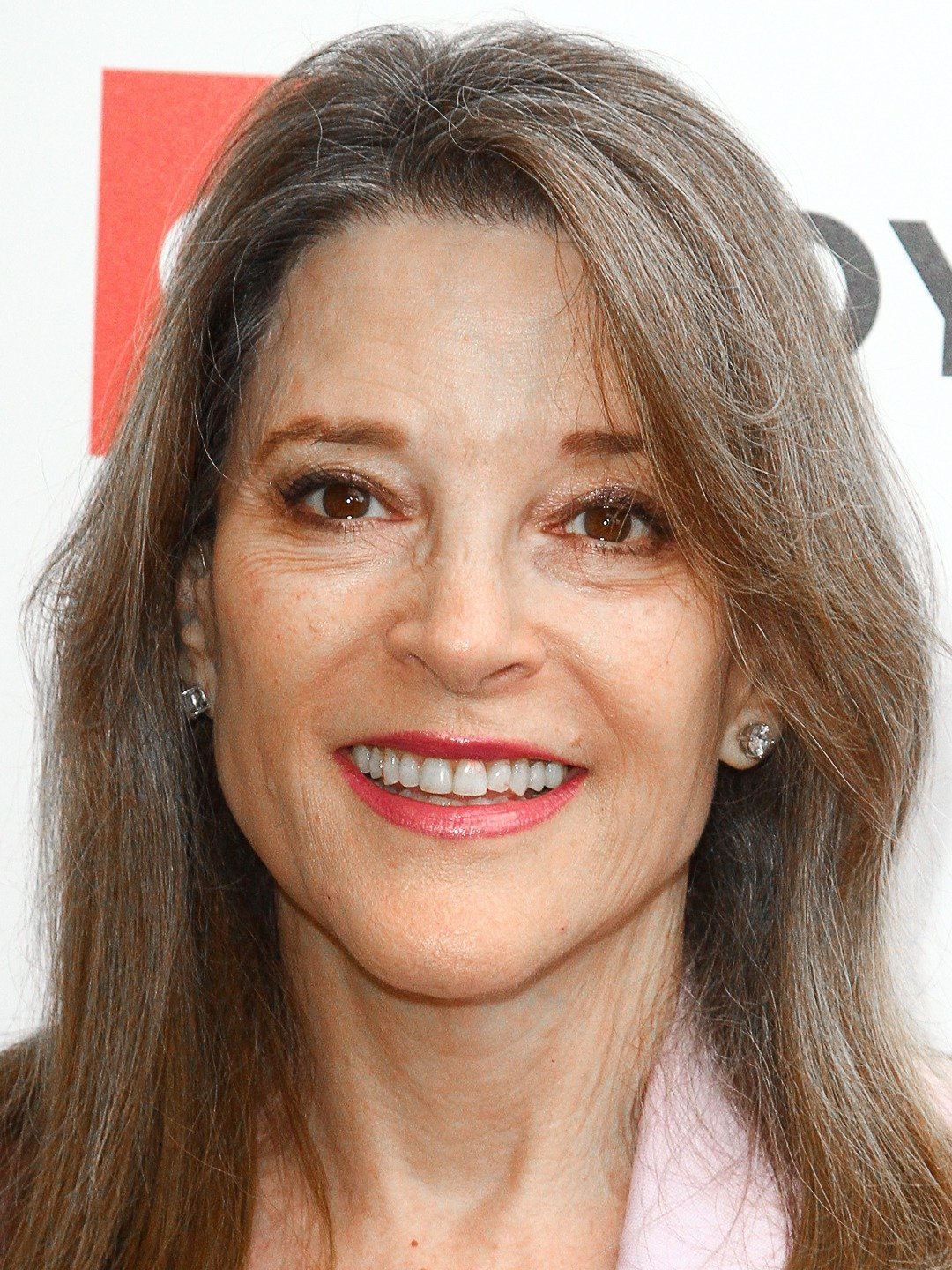
Candidate	Joe Biden	Marianne Williamson
Home state	Delaware	Washington, D.C.
Delegate count	23	0
Popular vote	2,297	79
Percentage	95.2%	3.3%
Biden
60 – 70%
70 – 80%
80 – 90%
90 – 100%
No votes

The 2024 Idaho Democratic presidential caucuses were held on May 23, 2024, as part of the Democratic Party primaries for the 2024 presidential election. 23 delegates to the Democratic National Convention were allocated in the semi-closed caucuses, with 4 additional unpledged delegates.

Incumbent President Joe Biden won the caucuses without significant hurdles, by attaining over 95% of the vote during little turnout.

== Candidates ==
- Joe Biden
- David Olscamp
- Jason Palmer (withdrawn)
- Armando Perez-Serrato
- Dean Philips (withdrawn)
- Marianne Williamson

== Results ==
Idaho Democratic caucus, May 23, 2024
Candidate	Votes	%	Delegates
Joe Biden (incumbent)	2,297	95.23	23
Marianne Williamson	79	3.28	0
Dean Phillips (withdrawn)	14	0.58	0
David Olscamp	14	0.58	0
Jason Palmer (withdrawn)	5	0.21	0
Armando Perez-Serrato	3	0.12	0
Total	2,412	100%	23

== See also ==
- 2024 Idaho Republican presidential caucus
- 2024 Democratic Party presidential primaries
- 2024 United States presidential election
- 2024 United States presidential election in Idaho
- 2024 United States elections
