= 2024 Utah Democratic presidential primary =

- March 5, 2024

34 delegates (30 pledged, 4 unpledged) to the Democratic National Convention

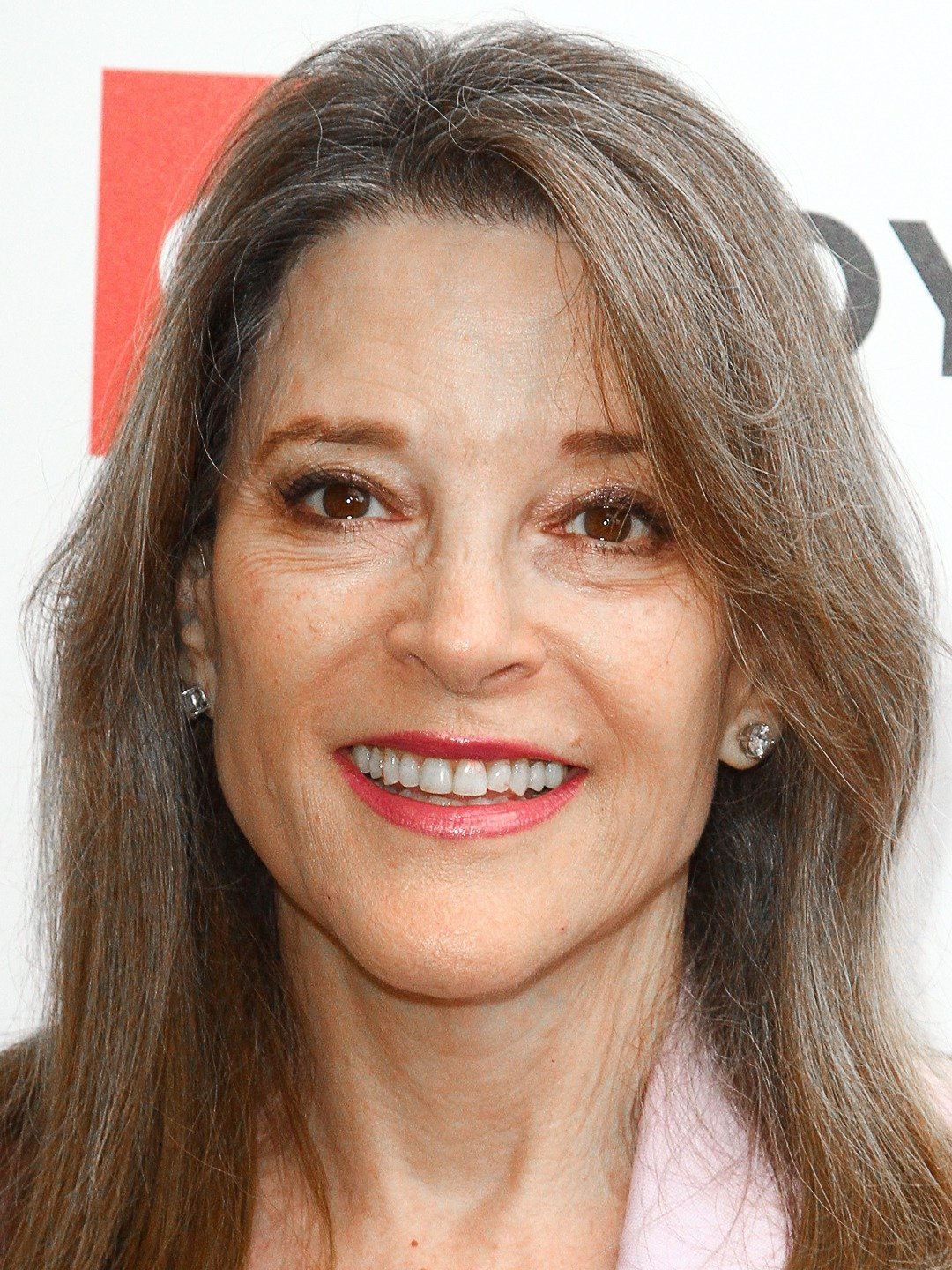
Candidate	Joe Biden	Marianne Williamson
Home state	Delaware	Washington, D.C.
Delegate count	30	0
Popular vote	59,235	3,562
Percentage	86.8%	5.2%
County results
Biden
70–80%
80–90%
>90%

The 2024 Utah Democratic presidential primary took place on March 5, 2024, as part of the Democratic Party primaries for the 2024 presidential election. 30 delegates to the Democratic National Convention were allocated, with 4 additional unpledged delegates. The open primary was held on Super Tuesday alongside primaries in 14 other states and territories. The Republican caucuses were held on the same day.

Incumbent Joe Biden won the primary without significant opposition and received all 30 delegates. Marianne Williamson and Dean Phillips placed behind him, both with just about 5% of votes.

== Candidates ==
Candidates had to pay a $500 filing fee in order to participate. The following candidates were certified to appear on the ballot:

- Joe Biden
- Gabriel Cornejo
- Frank Lozada
- Dean Phillips
- Marianne Williamson

== Results ==
2024 Utah Democratic pres. primary
Candidate	Votes	%	Delegates
Joe Biden (incumbent)	59,235	86.80	30
Marianne Williamson	3,562	5.22	0
Dean Phillips	3,065	4.49	0
Gabriel Cornejo	1,517	2.22	0
Frank Lozada	868	1.27	0
Total	68,247	100%	30

== See also ==
- 2024 Utah Republican presidential caucuses
- 2024 Democratic Party presidential primaries
- 2024 United States presidential election
- 2024 United States presidential election in Utah
- 2024 United States elections
