= 2024 Wyoming Democratic presidential caucuses =

- April 13, 2024

17 delegates (13 pledged and 4 unpledged) to the Democratic National Convention

Candidate	Joe Biden	Uncommitted
Home state	Delaware	–
Delegate count	13	0
Popular vote	380	13
Percentage	96.0%	3.3%
Results by county
Biden
70–80%
80–90%
>90%
No Votes

The 2024 Wyoming Democratic presidential caucuses were held on April 13, 2024, in the U.S. state of Wyoming, as one of the Democratic Party primaries ahead of the 2024 presidential election. 13 delegates to the Democratic National Convention were allocated, with 4 additional unpledged delegates.

Incumbent President Joe Biden announced his bid for a second term on April 25, 2023. He faced primary challenges from author, progressive activist, and 2020 presidential candidate Marianne Williamson, and Representative Dean Phillips. Biden won the little attended caucuses in a landslide.

== Results ==
Wyoming Democratic caucuses, April 13, 2024
Candidate	Votes	%	Delegates
Joe Biden (incumbent)	380	95.96	13
David Olscamp	2	0.51	0
Marianne Williamson	1	0.25	0
Stephen Lyons (withdrawn)	0	0.00	0
Jason Palmer	0	0.00	0
Armando Perez-Serrato	0	0.00	0
Dean Phillips (withdrawn)	0	0.00	0
Uncommitted	13	3.28	0
Total	396	100%	13

== See also ==
- 2024 Democratic Party presidential primaries
- 2024 United States presidential election
- 2024 United States presidential election in Wyoming
- 2024 United States elections
