= 2024 Democrats Abroad presidential primary =

- March 5–12, 2024

17 delegate votes (13 pledged, 4 unpledged) to the Democratic National Convention

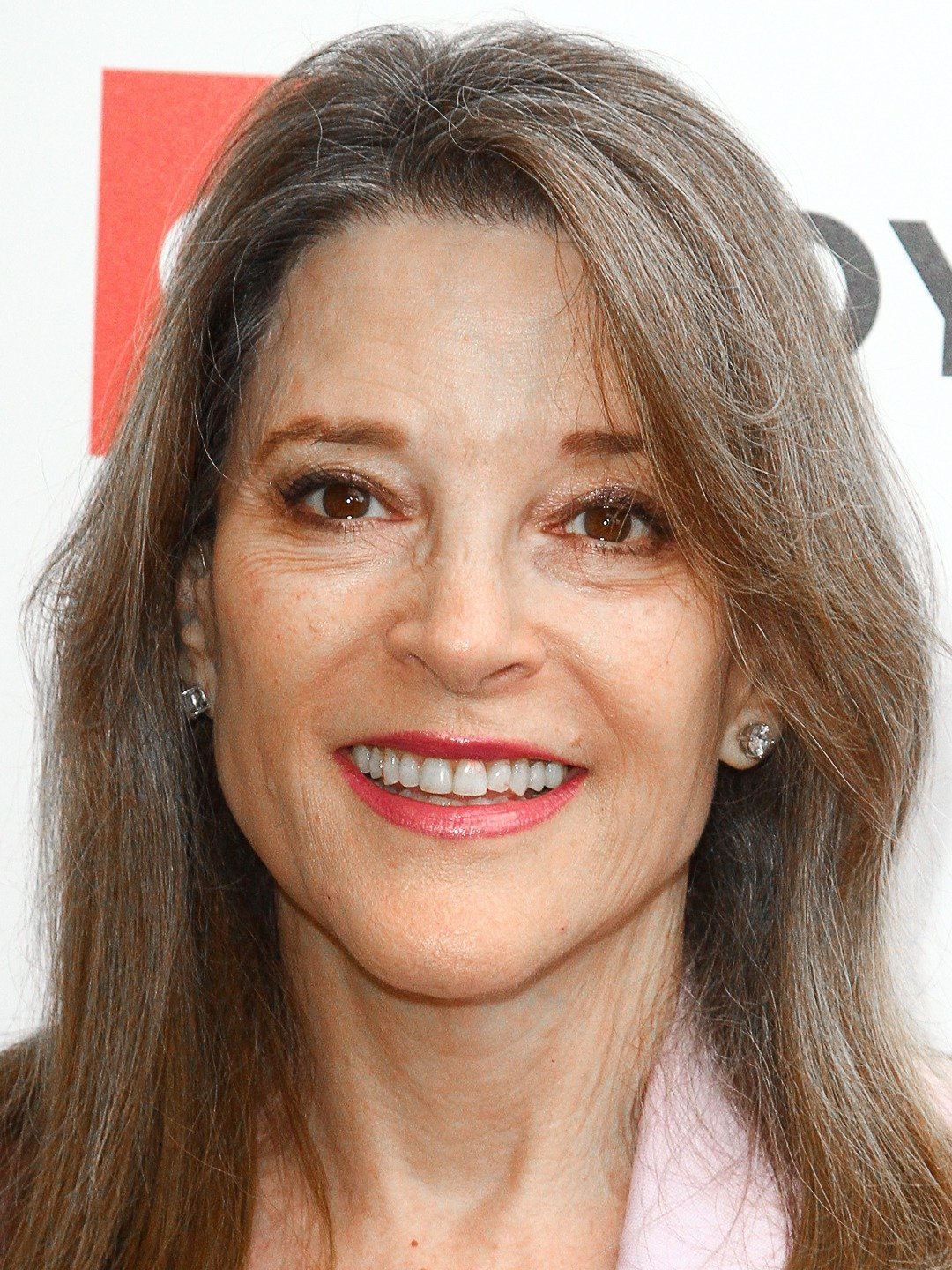
Candidate	Joe Biden	Uncommitted	Marianne Williamson
Home state	Delaware	–	Washington, D.C.
Delegate count	13	0	0
Popular vote	6,907	1,136	575
Percentage	80.1%	13.2%	6.7%
- Election results by country. Joe Biden Uncommitted Marianne Williamson Tie Biden prevailed in all areas (Americas, Asia-Pacific and EMEA)

The 2024 Democrats Abroad presidential primary took place from March 5, 2024, to March 12, 2024, allowing U.S. citizens residing outside the United States and those officially affiliated with Democrats Abroad to participate in the Democratic Party primaries for the 2024 presidential election. The global primary allocated 13 delegates to the 2024 Democratic National Convention, with 4 additional votes represented by 8 unpledged delegates.

The contest went on from Super Tuesday (alongside primaries in 16 states and territories) until 7 days later. Official results of the primary were released on March 19, 2024. President Joe Biden won with a decisive result of 80%, though the Uncommitted National Movement closely missed out on winning a few delegates and did win the vote in six countries, while author Marianne Williamson also won in one country.

== Candidates ==
The following candidates were certified to appear on the ballot for Democrats Abroad.

- Joe Biden
- Marianne Williamson

The ballot included an additional Uncommitted option.

== Endorsements ==
Joe Biden

Heads of state and government

- Olaf Scholz, Chancellor of Germany (2021–2025) (Social Democratic Party)
- Luiz Inácio Lula da Silva, President of Brazil (2003–2010, 2023–present) (Workers' Party)
Uncommitted

Organizations

- Democratic Socialists of America

== Results ==
2024 Democrats Abroad pres. primary
Candidate	Votes	%	Delegates
Joe Biden (incumbent)	6,907	80.15	13
Marianne Williamson	575	6.67	0
Uncommitted	1,136	13.19	0
Total:	8,618	100%	13

=== Results by country ===
Overview of Democrats Abroad results by country
Country	Biden	Williamson	Uncommitted	Total	Percent of total
Angola	1	0	0	1	0.01%
Argentina	4	0	4	8	0.09%
Australia	154	14	28	196	2.27%
Austria	126	23	19	168	1.95%
Bahamas	3	0	0	3	0.03%
Bahrain	1	0	0	1	0.01%
Bangladesh	1	0	0	1	0.01%
Belgium	62	6	14	82	0.95%
Belize	1	1	0	2	0.02%
Bosnia and Herzegovina	1	0	0	1	0.01%
Brazil	20	1	6	27	0.31%
Bulgaria	4	0	0	4	0.05%
Cambodia	4	0	0	4	0.05%
Canada	819	50	120	989	11.48%
Chile	4	0	3	7	0.08%
China	85	11	19	115	1.33%
Colombia	11	0	3	14	0.16%
Costa Rica	92	6	9	107	1.24%
Croatia	2	0	1	3	0.03%
Cyprus	3	0	0	3	0.03%
Czechia	115	11	27	153	1.78%
Denmark	90	9	14	113	1.31%
Dominican Republic	12	0	0	12	0.14%
Ecuador	66	2	7	75	0.87%
Egypt	0	0	3	3	0.03%
Estonia	1	0	0	1	0.01%
Finland	32	4	6	42	0.49%
France	584	42	85	711	8.25%
Germany	863	77	159	1099	12.75%
Ghana	4	0	0	4	0.05%
Great Britain	953	96	168	1217	14.12%
Greece	79	13	16	108	1.25%
Grenada	1	0	0	1	0.01%
Guatemala	42	3	4	49	0.57%
Guyana	21	0	0	21	0.21%
Honduras	2	0	0	2	0.02%
Hungary	16	2	7	25	0.29%
Iceland	1	1	2	4	0.05%
India	20	1	5	26	0.30%
Indonesia	11	0	3	14	0.16%
Israel	56	7	9	72	0.84%
Italy	152	18	21	191	2.22%
Ivory Coast	1	0	0	1	0.01%
Japan	110	12	32	154	1.79%
Jordan	1	0	1	2	0.02%
Kazakhstan	1	0	0	1	0.01%
Kenya	20	2	7	29	0.34%
Korea Republic	23	1	1	25	0.29%
Laos	1	1	0	2	0.02%
Latvia	1	1	0	2	0.02%
Luxembourg	15	1	8	24	0.28%
Madagascar	1	0	0	1	0.01%
Malaysia	2	0	1	3	0.03%
Malta	1	0	0	1	0.01%
Mexico	477	17	27	521	6.05%
Moldova	1	0	0	1	0.01%
Monaco	2	0	0	2	0.02%
Morocco	4	0	0	4	0.05%
Mozambique	1	0	0	1	0.01%
Myanmar	1	0	0	1	0.01%
Netherlands	209	13	50	272	3.16%
New Zealand	39	6	13	58	0.67%
Nicaragua	0	1	0	1	0.01%
Nigeria	2	0	0	2	0.02%
North Macedonia	1	0	1	2	0.02%
Norway	80	4	17	101	1.17%
Oman	2	0	0	2	0.02%
Pakistan	0	1	3	4	0.05%
Panama	32	3	1	36	0.42%
Paraguay	1	0	0	1	0.01%
Peru	4	0	0	4	0.05%
Philippines	20	2	2	24	0.28%
Poland	12	0	2	14	0.16%
Portugal	293	11	17	321	3.72%
Qatar	2	0	3	5	0.06%
Republic of Ireland	103	9	23	135	1.57%
Romania	7	0	0	7	0.08%
Russia	1	0	1	2	0.02%
Saint Kitts and Nevis	1	0	0	1	0.01%
Saint Vincent and the Grenadines	7	0	0	7	0.08%
Saudi Arabia	3	1	0	4	0.05%
Senegal	0	0	1	1	0.01%
Serbia	3	1	0	4	0.05%
Singapore	37	1	4	42	0.49%
Slovakia	2	0	0	2	0.02%
Slovenia	1	0	1	2	0.02%
South Africa	21	3	3	27	0.31%
Spain	380	83	48	466	5.41%
Sweden	179	20	35	234	2.72%
Switzerland	172	12	26	210	2.44%
Taiwan	20	2	4	26	0.30%
Thailand	48	5	12	65	0.75%
Tonga	1	0	0	1	0.01%
Tunisia	1	0	1	2	0.02%
Turkey	24	4	10	38	0.44%
Uganda	1	0	0	1	0.01%
Ukraine	3	0	0	3	0.03%
United Arab Emirates	27	7	20	54	0.63%
Uruguay	0	0	1	1	0.01%
Vietnam	5	0	2	7	0.08%
Zambia	1	0	0	1	0.01%
TOTAL	6,907	575	1,136	8,618	
Percent	80.15%	6.67%	13.18%	100.00%	

== See also ==
- 2024 Democratic Party presidential primaries
- 2024 United States presidential election
- 2024 United States elections
- Democrats Abroad presidential primary
