= 2024 District of Columbia Democratic presidential primary =

- June 4, 2024

52 delegates (20 pledged and 32 unpledged) to the Democratic National Convention

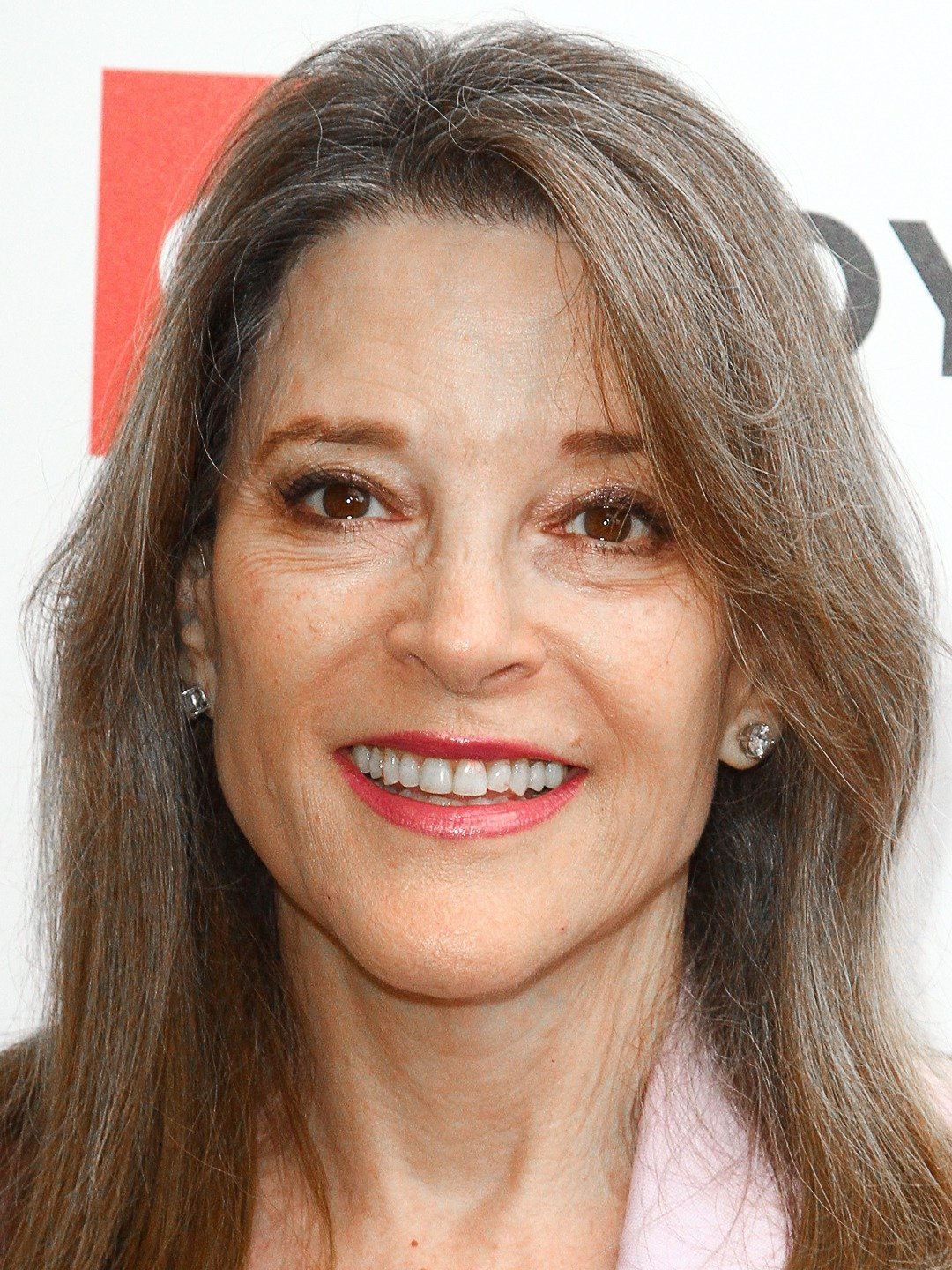
Candidate	Joe Biden	Write-in votes	Marianne Williamson
Home state	Delaware	–	Washington, D.C.
Delegate count	20	–	0
Popular vote	80,240	7,113	3,958
Percentage	84.5%	7.5%	4.2%
Biden
70–80%
80–90%
90–100%
Biden
70–80%
80–90%
90–100%

The 2024 District of Columbia Democratic presidential primary was held on June 4, 2024, together with four other primaries on the day, as part of the Democratic Party primaries for the 2024 presidential election. 20 delegates to the 2024 Democratic National Convention were allocated, with 29 additional unpledged delegates.

Incumbent president Joe Biden won the primary with little opposition. Author and activist Marianne Williamson kept herself around 4%, while over 7% of the vote went to the write-in option.

== Candidates ==
Three candidates filed for the Democratic presidential primary ballot before the deadline:

- Joe Biden
- Armando Perez-Serrato
- Marianne Williamson

Dean Phillips was on the ballot before, but withdrew from it.

== Results ==
District of Columbia Democratic primary, June 4, 2024
Candidate	Votes	%	Delegates
Joe Biden (incumbent)	80,240	84.50	20
Marianne Williamson	3,958	4.17	0
Armando Perez-Serrato	1,030	1.08	0
Write-in votes	7,113	7.49	—
Over and undervotes (Note: Over votes 108, under votes 2,507)	2,615	2.75	—
Total	94,956	100%	20

== See also ==
- 2024 District of Columbia Republican presidential primary
- 2024 Democratic Party presidential primaries
- 2024 United States presidential election
- 2024 United States presidential election in the District of Columbia
- 2024 United States elections
