= 2024 Puerto Rico Democratic presidential primary =

- April 28, 2024

60 delegates (55 pledged and 5 unpledged) to the Democratic National Convention

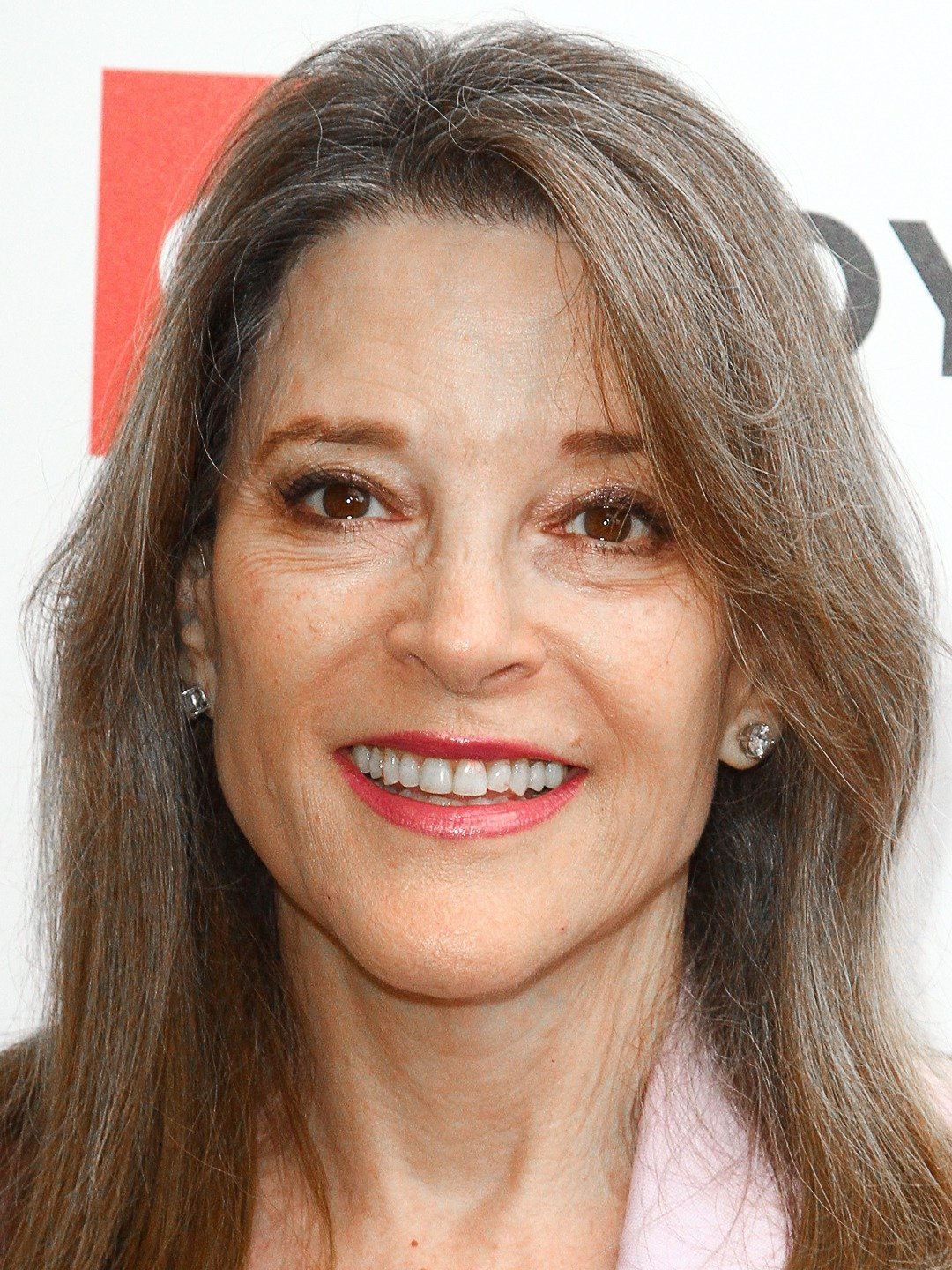
Candidate	Joe Biden	Marianne Williamson
Home state	Delaware	Washington, D.C.
Delegate count	55	0
Popular vote	3,296	230
Percentage	85.7%	6.0%
Senatorial district results
Biden
80–90%
>90%

The 2024 Puerto Rico Democratic presidential primary was held on April 28, 2024, as part of the Democratic Party primaries for the 2024 presidential election. 55 delegates to the Democratic National Convention were allocated in the open primary, with 5 additional unpledged delegates.

Incumbent President Joe Biden won the primary and all delegates ahead of challengers Marianne Williamson and Dean Phillips.

== Candidates ==
Incumbent President Joe Biden announced his bid for a second term on April 25, 2023. He faced a primary challenge from author, progressive activist, and 2020 presidential candidate Marianne Williamson, and Representative Dean Phillips. All three candidates appeared on the ballot.

== Endorsements ==
Joe Biden

State officials

- Pedro Pierluisi, Governor of Puerto Rico (2021–2025)

== Results ==
Puerto Rico Democratic primary, April 28, 2024
Candidate	Votes	%	Delegates
Joe Biden (incumbent)	3,296	85.65	55
Marianne Williamson	230	5.98	0
Dean Phillips (withdrawn)	165	4.29	0
Blank and void ballots (Note: Blank 109, void 48 votes)	157	4.08	—
Total	3,848	100%	55

== See also ==
- 2024 Puerto Rico presidential primaries
- 2024 Puerto Rico Republican presidential primary
