= 2024 Democratic Party presidential primaries =

- Presidential primary
- January 23 – June 8, 2024
- Opinion polls

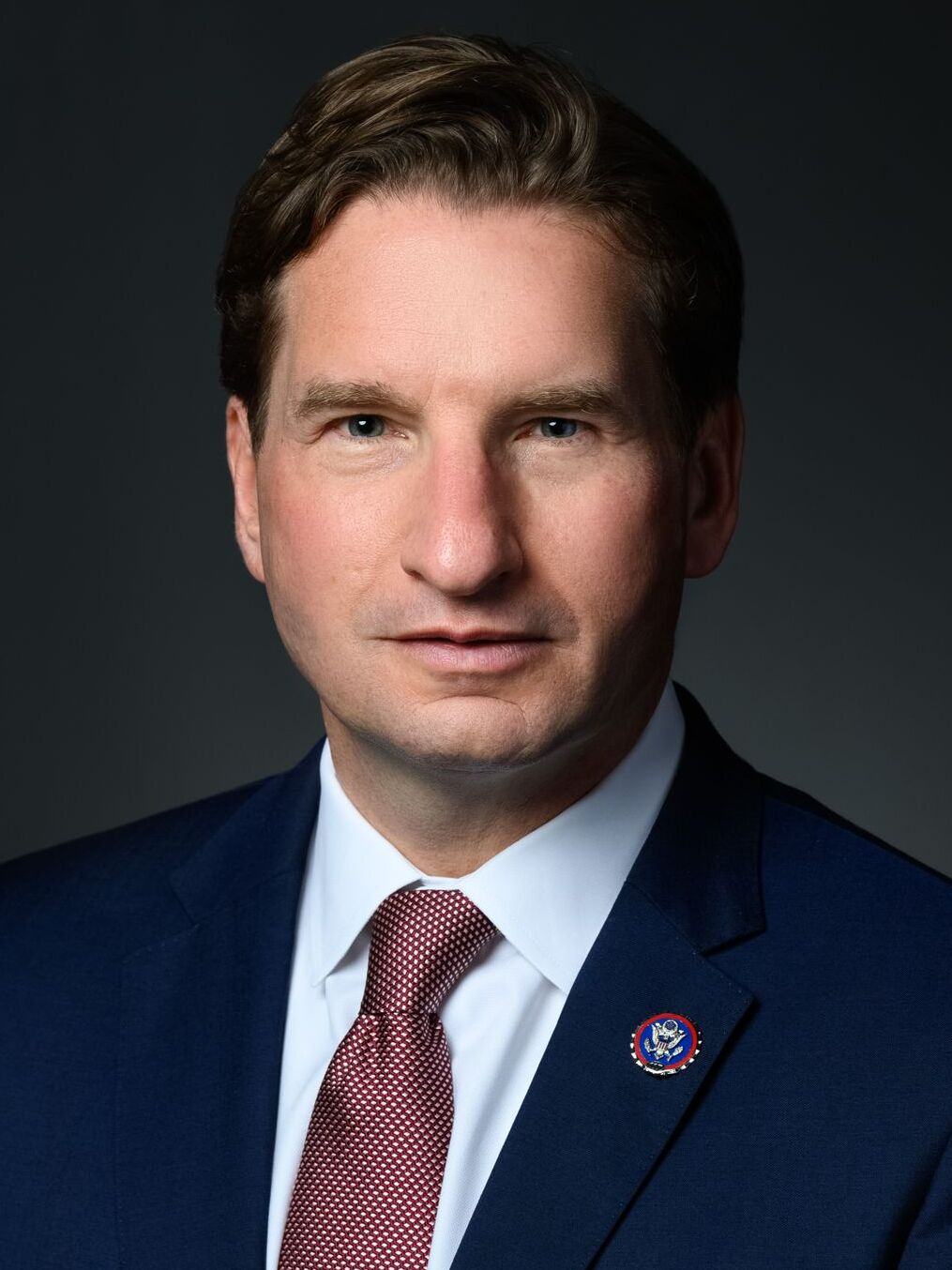

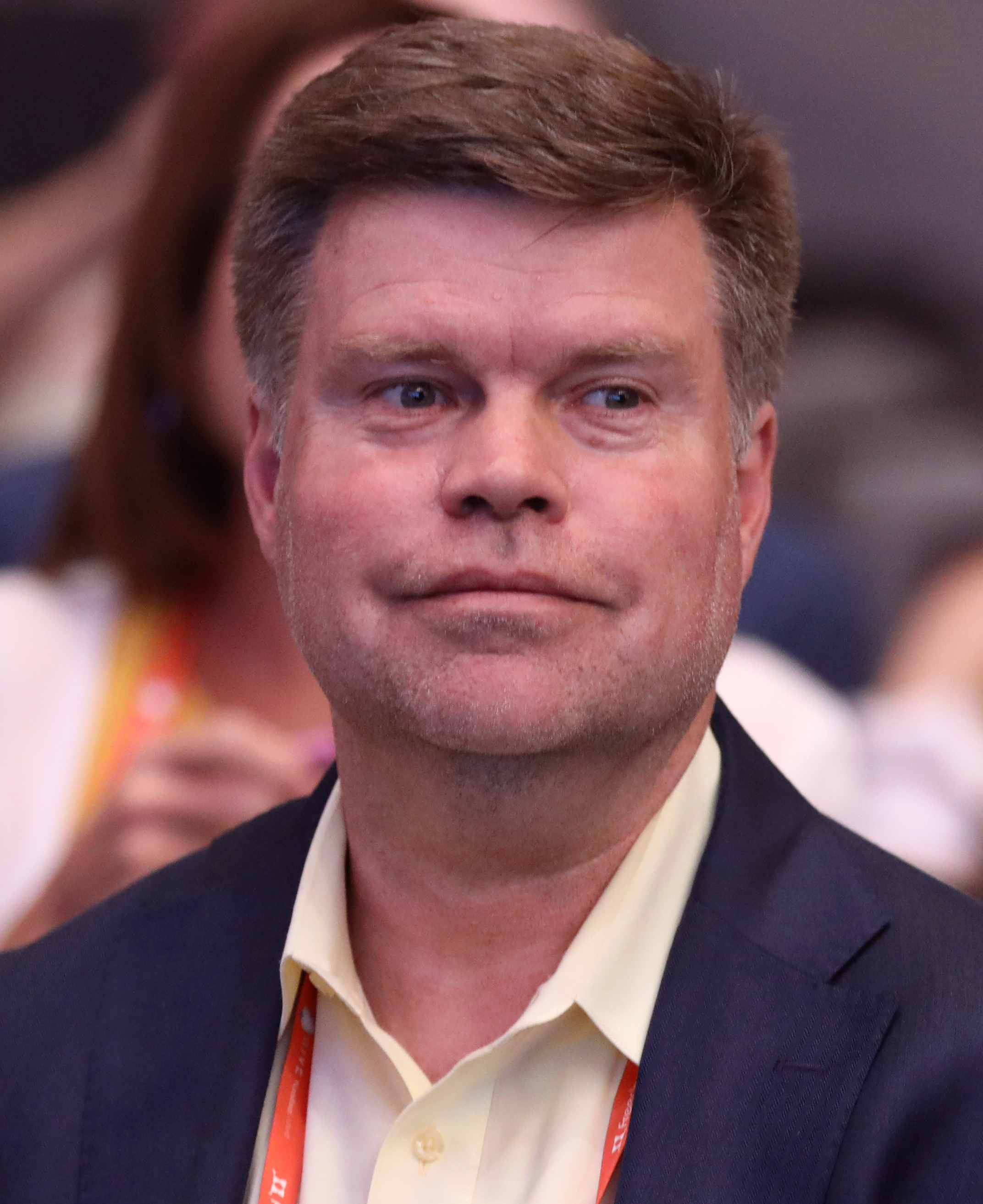
Candidate	Joe Biden (Note: Biden withdrew from the race on July 21, 2024, after the primaries had concluded, and immediately endorsed his vice president, Kamala Harris.)	Uncommitted (Note: Also includes: "None of These Candidates" in Nevada; "noncommitted delegate" in Colorado; "no preference" in Massachusetts, Montana, and North Carolina; "undeclared" in Wyoming; "none of the names shown" in Kansas; "uninstructed delegation" in Wisconsin.)
Home state	Delaware	–
Delegate count	3,905	37
Contests won	56	0
Popular vote	14,183,228 (Note: Write-in vote totals are excluded from the above election data reporting for the following states, and are added to the total number of votes for candidates for the purposes of candidate vote share calculations.)	706,591
Percentage	87.0% (Note: The calculation for percentage of votes excludes over/undervotes included by primary sources and accounts for write-ins included by the primary sources as well as additional write-in votes not included in their tracking, which have been reported by Edison Research in Massachusetts, Illinois, Washington, Rhode Island, Pennsylvania, Wisconsin, Nebraska, and New Jersey.)	4.3%
Candidate	Dean Phillips	Jason Palmer
Home state	Minnesota	Maryland
Delegate count	4	3
Contests won	0	1 (Note: Although Biden and Palmer both earned three delegates from American Samoa, it is counted as a win for Palmer because he won the popular vote.)
Popular vote	529,486	20,939
Percentage	3.3%	0.1%

Joe Biden
Jason Palmer
Primary canceled
- Roll call nomination
- August 1–5, 2024 (virtual); August 20, 2024 (DNC) (Note: Harris was officially nominated during a virtual roll call. The convention itself is ceremonial.)

4,695 delegates to the Democratic National Convention 2,348 delegates votes needed to win

Candidate	Kamala Harris	Present & Abstentions
Home state	California	–
Delegate count	4,567	128
Previous Democratic nominee
Joe Biden
Democratic nominee
Kamala Harris (Note: Biden was the presumptive nominee prior to the suspension of his re-election campaign. He immediately endorsed his vice president, Kamala Harris, who became the official nominee afterwards.)

From January 23 to June 8, 2024, presidential primaries and caucuses were organized by the Democratic Party to select delegates to determine the party's nominee for president in the 2024 United States presidential election. The elections took place in all U.S. states except Florida and Delaware, in the District of Columbia, in five U.S. territories, and as organized by Democrats Abroad.

On April 25, 2023, incumbent president Joe Biden announced that he would seek re-election in 2024. Eventually, three main primary opponents emerged: self-help author Marianne Williamson, who declared her candidacy in March 2023; anti-vaccine activist and environmental attorney Robert F. Kennedy Jr., who launched his candidacy in April 2023; and U.S. Representative Dean Phillips of Minnesota, who announced his candidacy in October 2023. Phillips argued that Biden would be a weak general election candidate due to his age and his low approval ratings. Additionally, the Uncommitted National Movement, supported by some Muslim Americans, Arab Americans, progressives, and socialists began advocating in 2024 for an "uncommitted" vote in protest against Biden due to his support for Israel during the Gaza war.

Kennedy withdrew from the Democratic primaries in October 2023 to run as an independent candidate. On March 6, 2024, Phillips suspended his campaign and endorsed Biden. After stopping and restarting her campaign, Williamson ended her campaign for the final time on July 29, 2024. Phillips received the second-highest number of delegates in the primaries of any candidate (four delegates gained).

Biden became the presumptive presidential nominee of the Democratic Party on March 12, 2024 by securing over 1,968 pledged delegates. Ultimately, Biden withdrew from the race on July 21 after losing the support of many Democrats because of age and health concerns following a debate with Donald Trump. He immediately endorsed Vice President Kamala Harris to replace him as the party's presidential nominee. By the next day, Harris had secured the non-binding support of enough uncommitted delegates that were previously pledged to Biden to make her the party's presumptive nominee. Harris officially became the party's presidential nominee following a virtual roll call with the support of approximately 97.21% of all the delegates. Harris and her running mate, Tim Walz, would go on to lose the election to the Republican ticket of Donald Trump and JD Vance.

== Candidates ==
As of April 2024, more than 190 candidates have filed with the Federal Election Commission (FEC) to run for the Democratic presidential nomination in 2024.

Following the withdrawal of President Biden on July 21, 2024, the race became an open contest to be decided at the Democratic National Convention.

=== Nominee ===
Democratic nominee for the 2024 presidential election
Candidate	Born	Most recent position	Home state	Campaign Announcement date	Total pledged delegates	Popular vote	Contests won	Running mate	Ref
Kamala Harris	October 20, 1964 (age 59); Oakland, California	Vice President of the United States (2021–2025)	California	Campaign July 21, 2024; FEC filing Website; Secured nomination: July 22, 2024	4567 / 4695 (97.3%)	None	0 (Note: Harris entered the race after the primaries were completed. She initially expected to remain as Biden's running mate for re-election prior to the suspension of his re-election campaign.)	Tim Walz	

=== Declined after the primaries ===
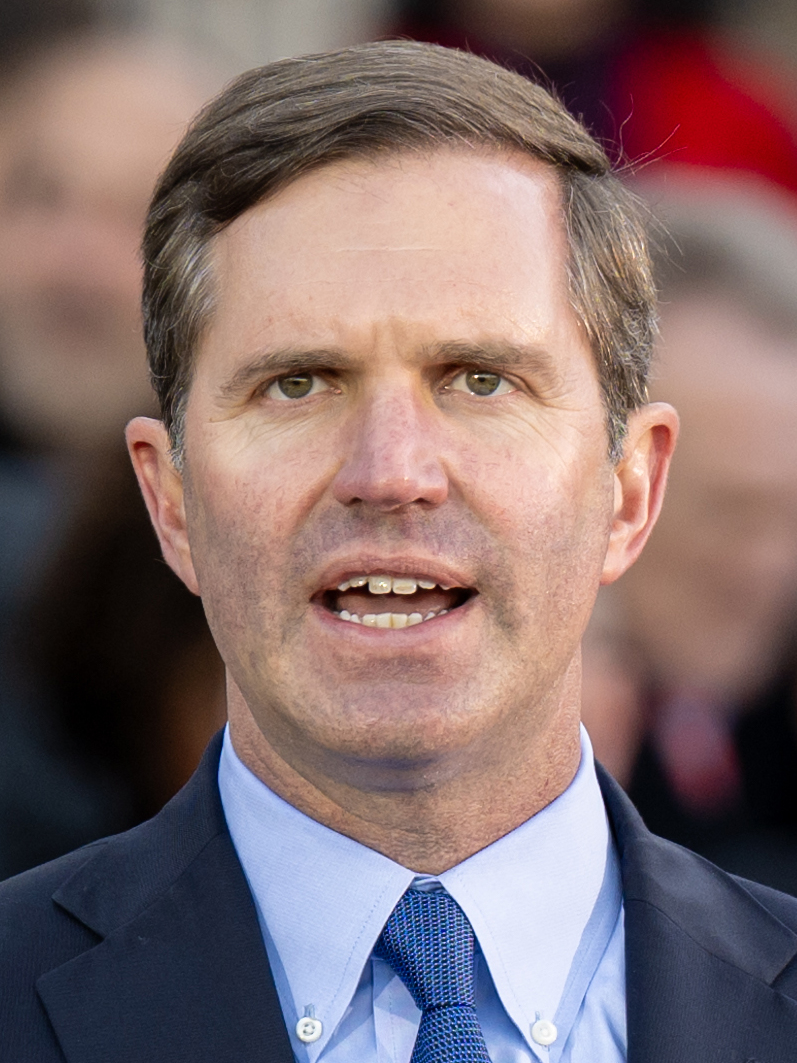
Andy Beshear, governor of Kentucky (2019–present) (endorsed Biden, then Harris after Biden's withdrawal)

Pete Buttigieg, U.S. secretary of transportation (2021–2025) and candidate for president in 2020 (endorsed Biden, then Harris after Biden's withdrawal)

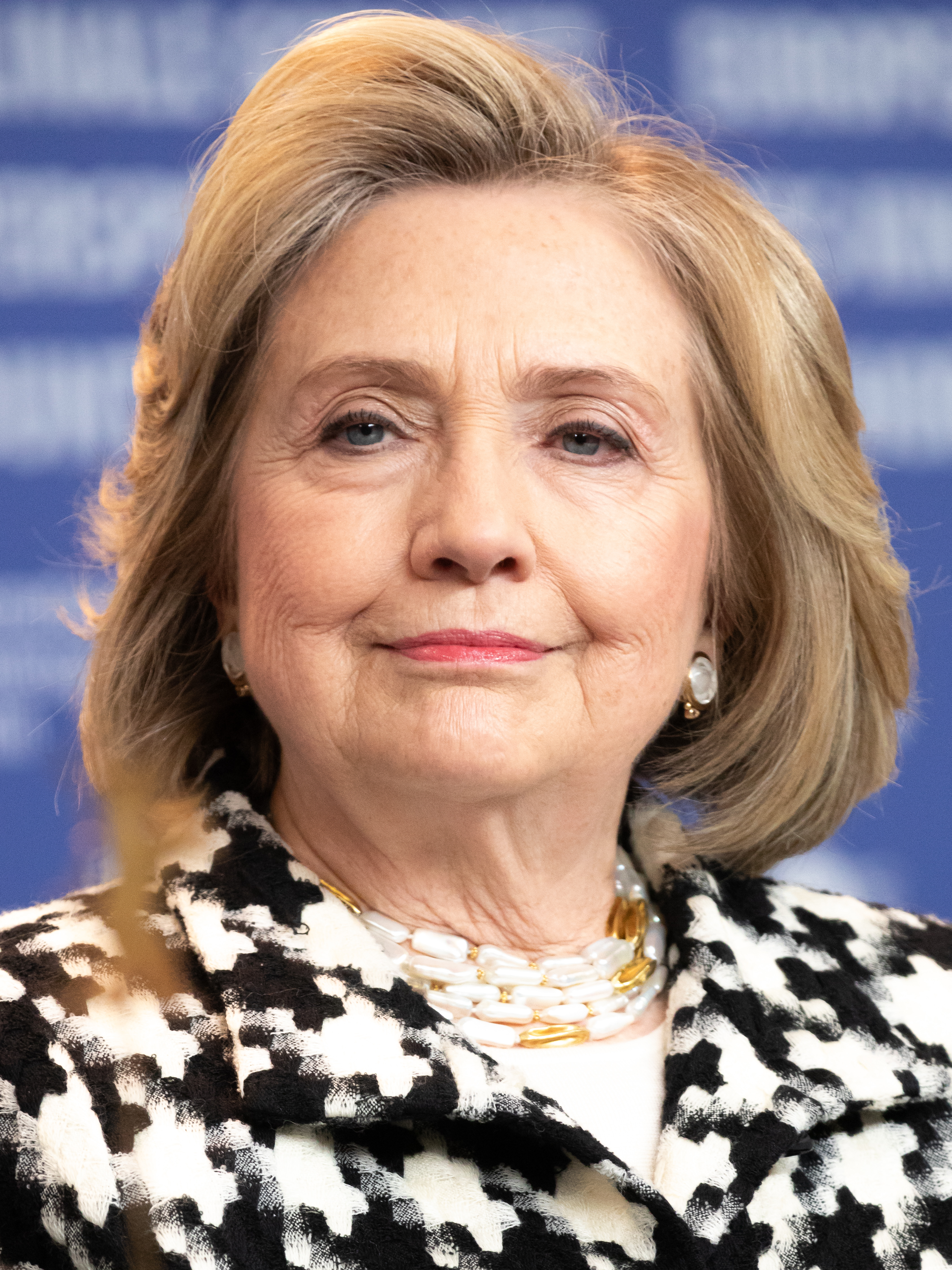
Hillary Clinton, 2016 Democratic nominee and candidate for president in 2008, former U.S. secretary of state (2009–2013), former U.S. senator from New York (2001–2009), and former first lady of the United States (1993–2001) (endorsed Biden, then Harris after Biden's withdrawal)

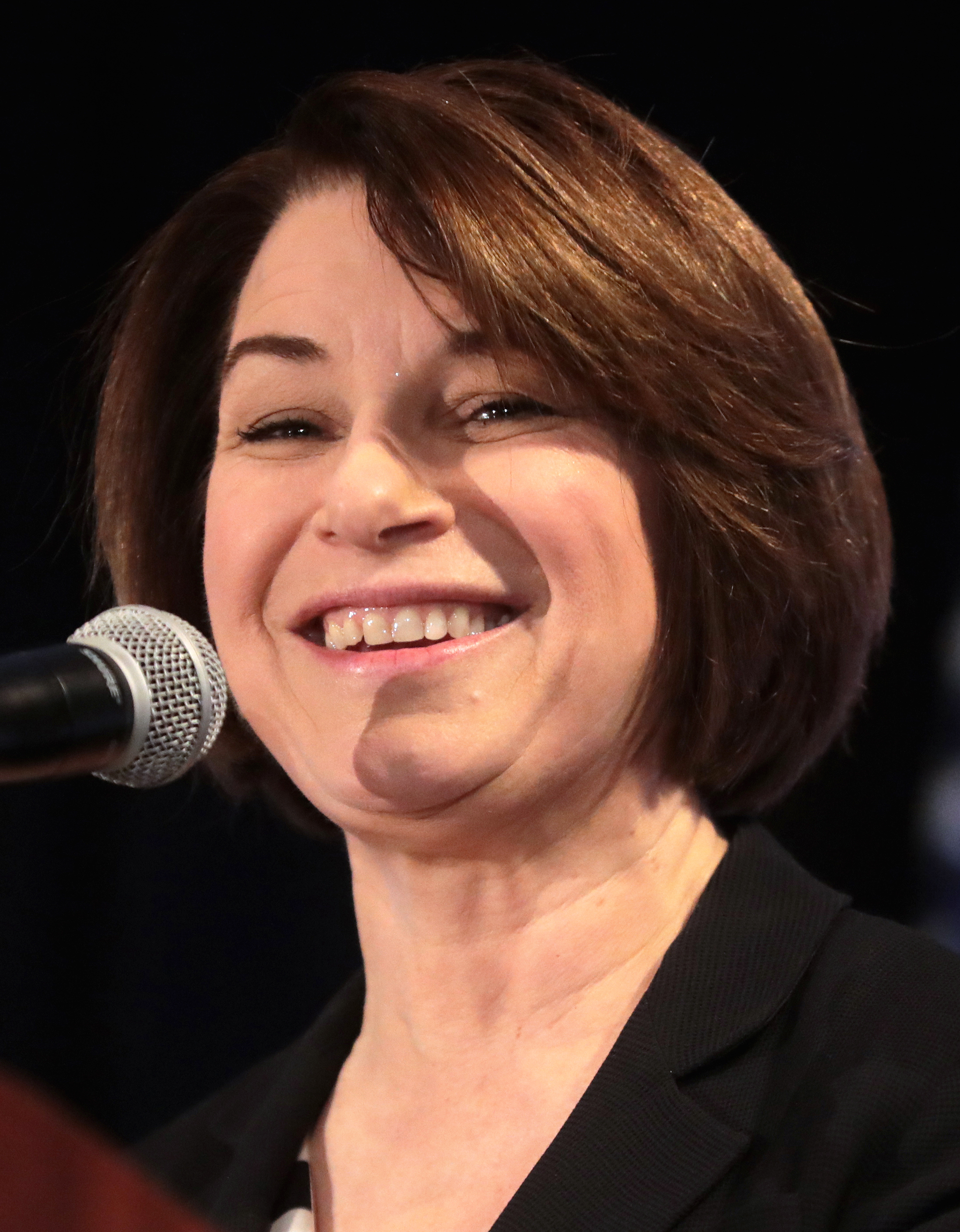
Amy Klobuchar, U.S. senator from Minnesota (2007–present), candidate for president in 2020 (endorsed Biden, then Harris after Biden's withdrawal)

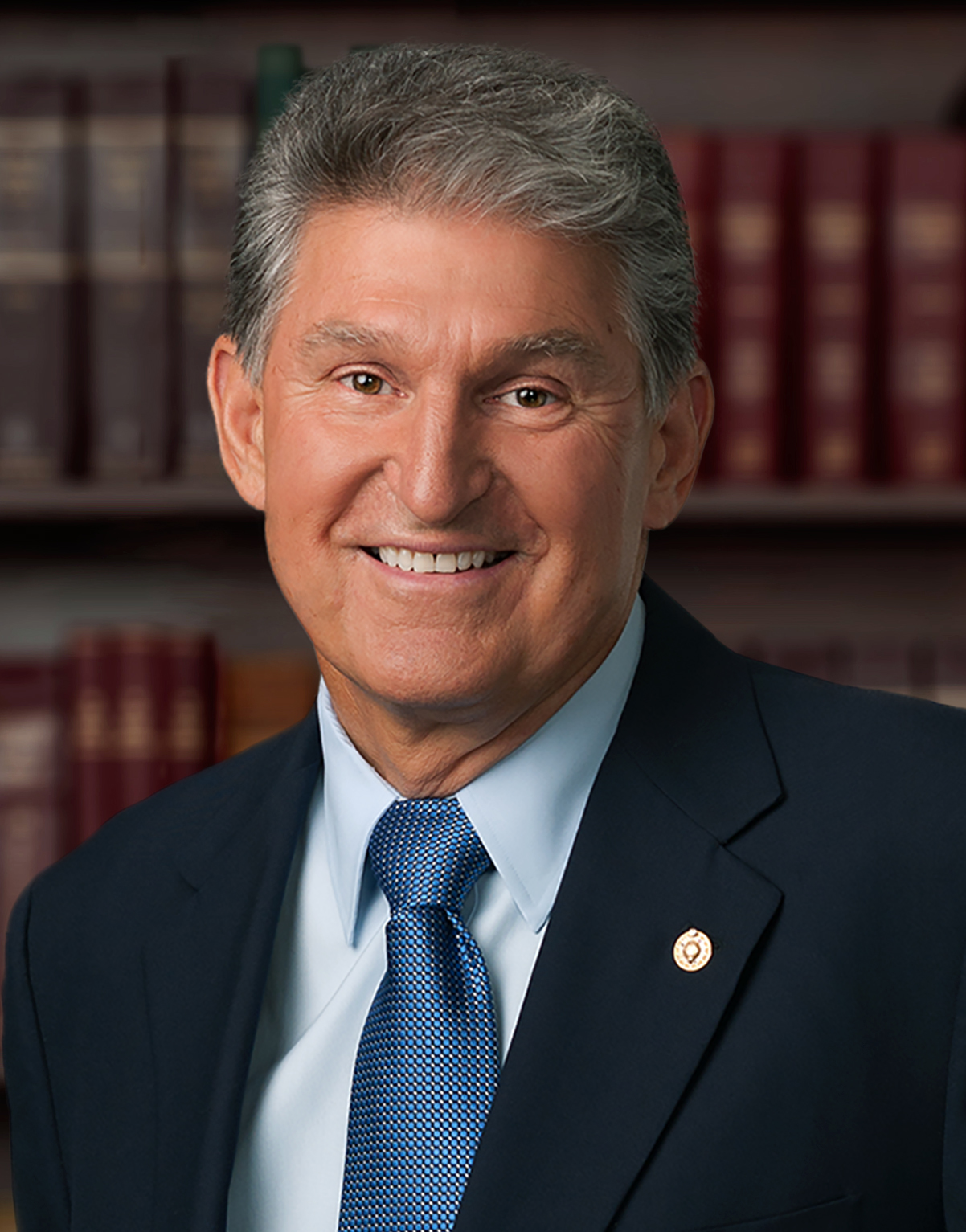
Joe Manchin, U.S. senator from West Virginia (2010–2025), former governor of West Virginia (2005–2010) (Independent; expressed interest in running after Biden withdrew, then declined)

Gavin Newsom, governor of California (2019–present) (endorsed Biden, then Harris after Biden's withdrawal)

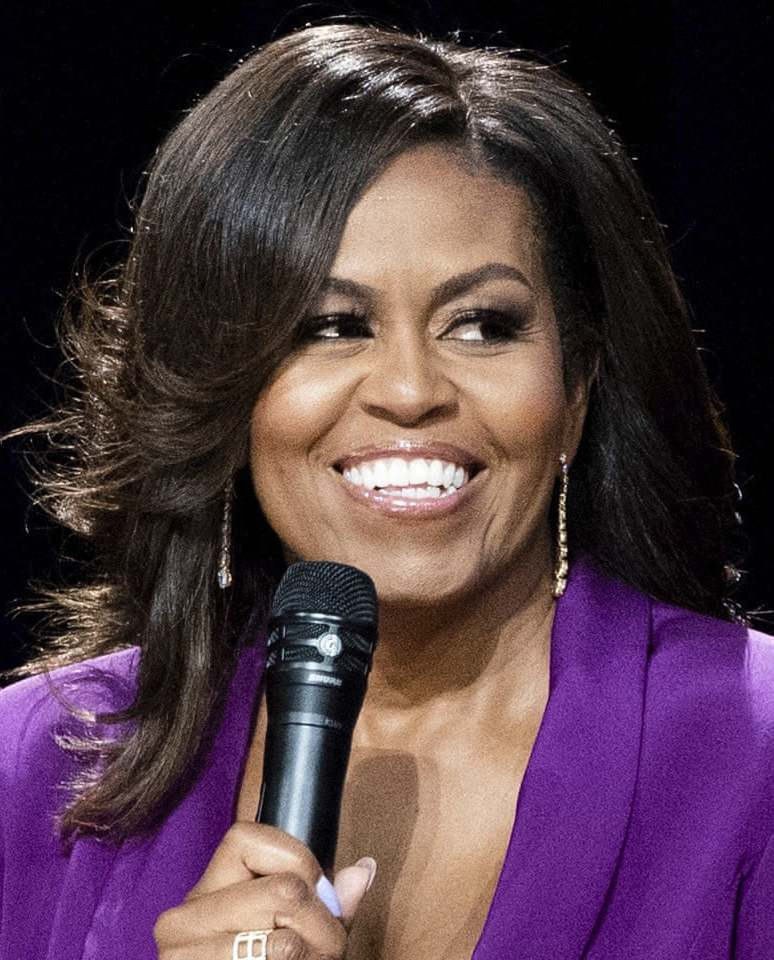
Michelle Obama, former first lady of the United States (2009–2017) (endorsed Biden, then Harris after Biden's withdrawal)

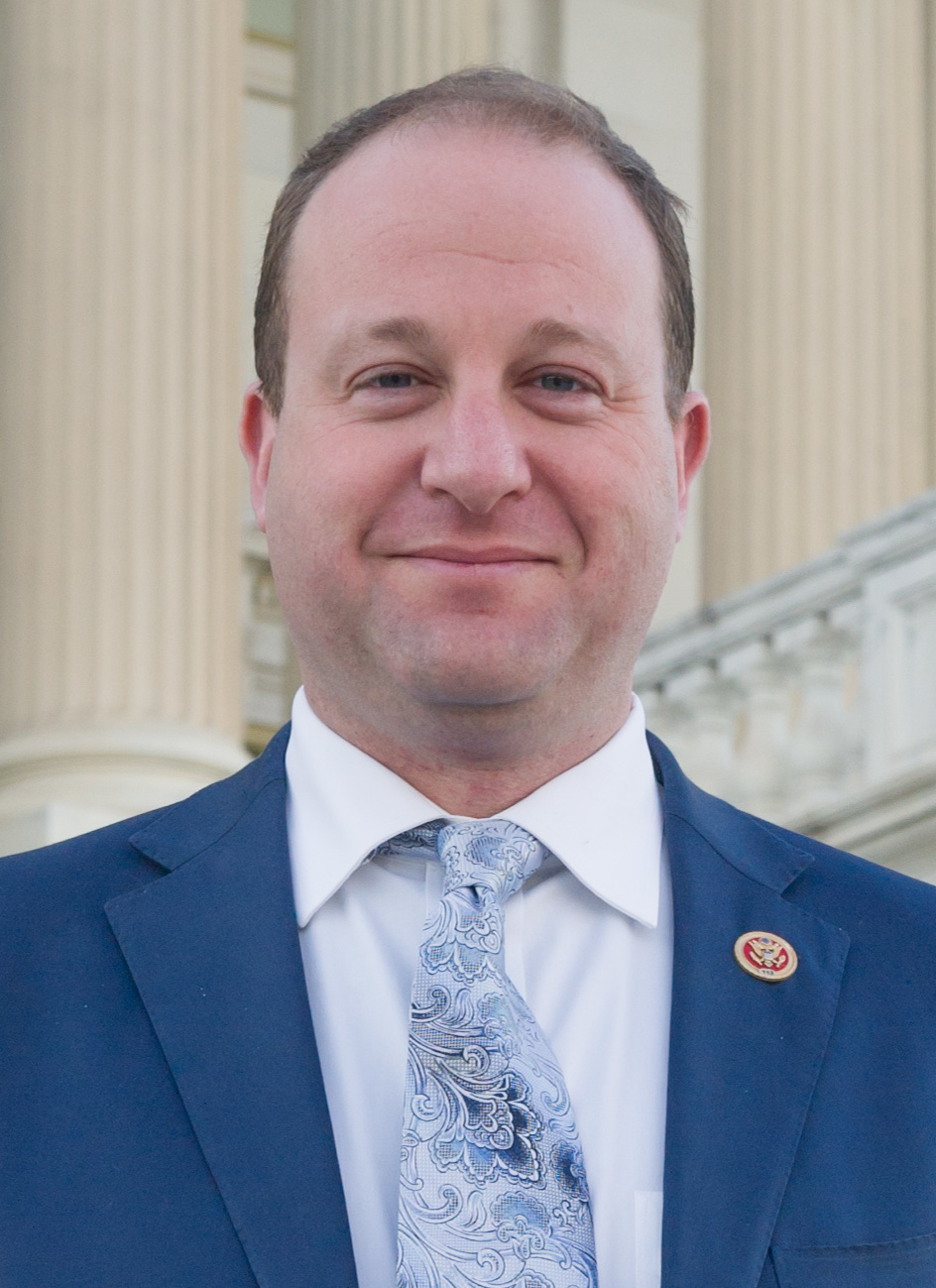
Jared Polis, governor of Colorado (2019–present) (endorsed Biden, then Harris after Biden's withdrawal)

Ken Salazar, U.S. ambassador to Mexico (2021–2025), former U.S. secretary of the interior (2009–2013), and former U.S. senator from Colorado (2005–2009) (privately considered running after Biden dropped out)

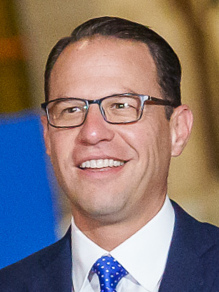
Josh Shapiro, governor of Pennsylvania (2023–present) (endorsed Biden, then Harris after Biden's withdrawal)

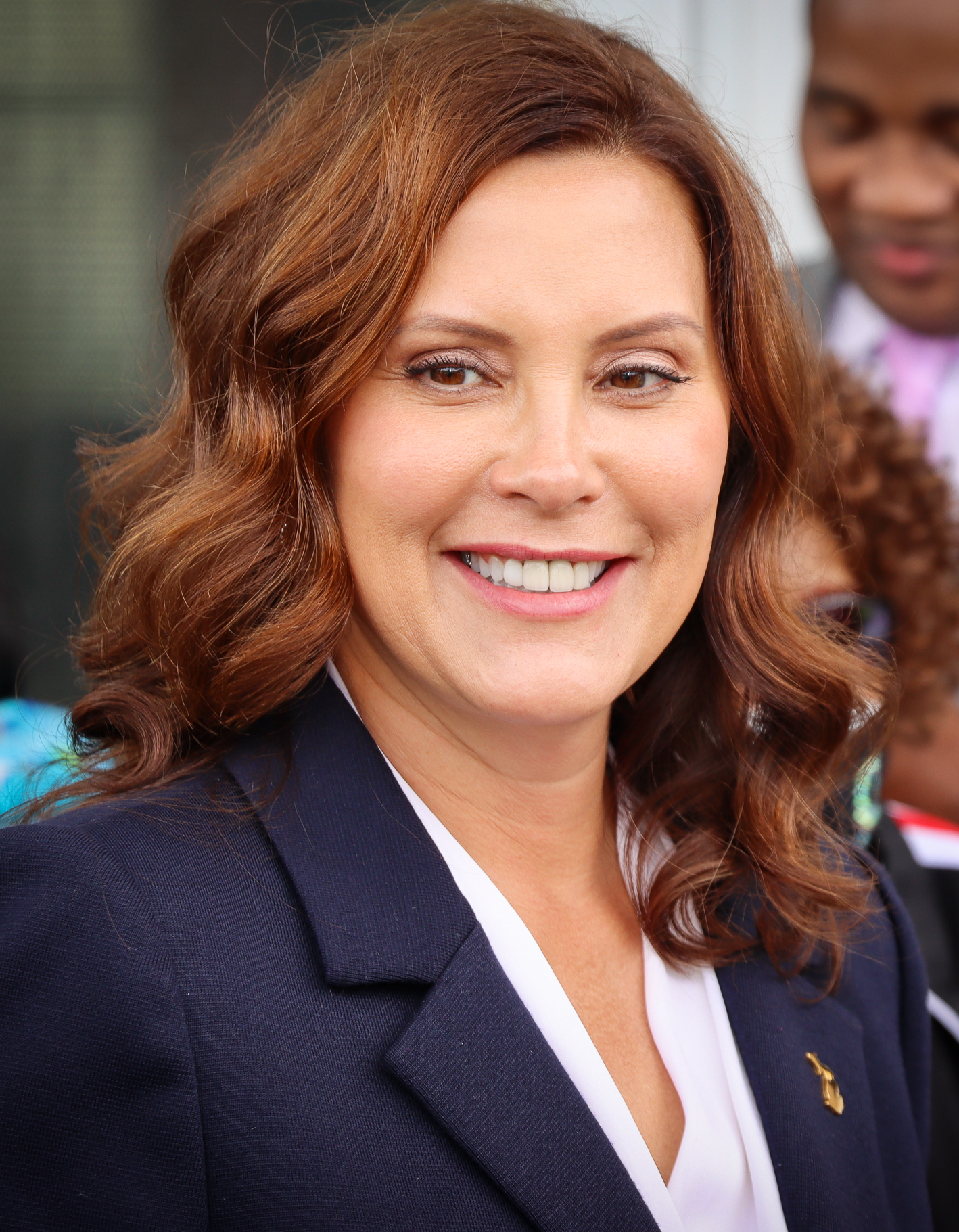
Gretchen Whitmer, governor of Michigan (2019–present) (endorsed Biden, then Harris after Biden's withdrawal)

=== Withdrew after the primaries ===
Major candidates who withdrew after the 2024 Democratic Party presidential primaries
Candidate	Born	Most recent position	Home state	Campaign announced	Campaign suspended	Campaign	Contests won	Total pledged delegates	Popular vote	Running mate	Ref
Joe Biden	November 20, 1942 (age 81); Scranton, Pennsylvania	President of the United States (2021–2025)	Delaware	April 25, 2023	July 21, 2024 (endorsed Harris)	Campaign FEC filing Website; Secured nomination: March 12, 2024 (Note: Biden was the presumptive nominee prior to the suspension of his re-election campaign. He immediately endorsed his vice president, Kamala Harris, who became the official nominee afterwards.)	56; AK, AL, AR, AZ, CA, CO, CT, DA, DC, DE (Note: The primary was cancelled, and Biden was awarded all pledged delegates.), FL, GA, GU, HI, ID, IL, IN, IA, KS, KY, LA, MA, ME, MD, MI, MN, MO, MP, MS, MT, NE, NV, NH (Note: Primary not sanctioned by the DNC. Delegates awarded through a separate firehouse primary.), NJ, NM, NY, NC, ND, OH, OK, OR, PA, PR, RI, SC, SD, TN, TX, UT, VA, VI, VT, WA, WV, WI, WY	3905 / 3949 (98.9%) (Note: This was prior to the suspension of his re-election campaign.)	14,465,519 (87.1%)	Kamala Harris	
Marianne Williamson	July 8, 1952 (age 72); Houston, Texas	Author	Washington, D.C.	March 4, 2023; February 28, 2024; July 2, 2024	February 7, 2024; June 11, 2024; July 29, 2024	Campaign FEC filing Website	None	0 / 3949 (0%)	465,863 (2.8%)	None	

=== Withdrew during the primaries ===
Major candidates who withdrew during the 2024 Democratic Party presidential primaries
Candidate	Born	Most recent position	Home state	Campaign announced	Campaign suspended	Campaign	Total pledged delegates	Contests won	Popular vote	Ref.
Jason Palmer	December 1, 1971 (age 52); Aberdeen, Maryland	Venture capitalist	Maryland	October 22, 2023	May 15, 2024 (endorsed Biden, then Harris after Biden's withdrawal)	Campaign FEC filing Website	3 / 3949 (0.1%)	1 AS	20,975 (0.1%)	
Dean Phillips	January 20, 1969 (age 55); Saint Paul, Minnesota	U.S. representative from MN-03 (2019–2025)	Minnesota	October 26, 2023	March 6, 2024 (endorsed Biden, then Harris after Biden's withdrawal)	Campaign FEC filing Website	4 / 3949 (0.1%)	None	529,486 (3.2%)	

==== Other candidates ====
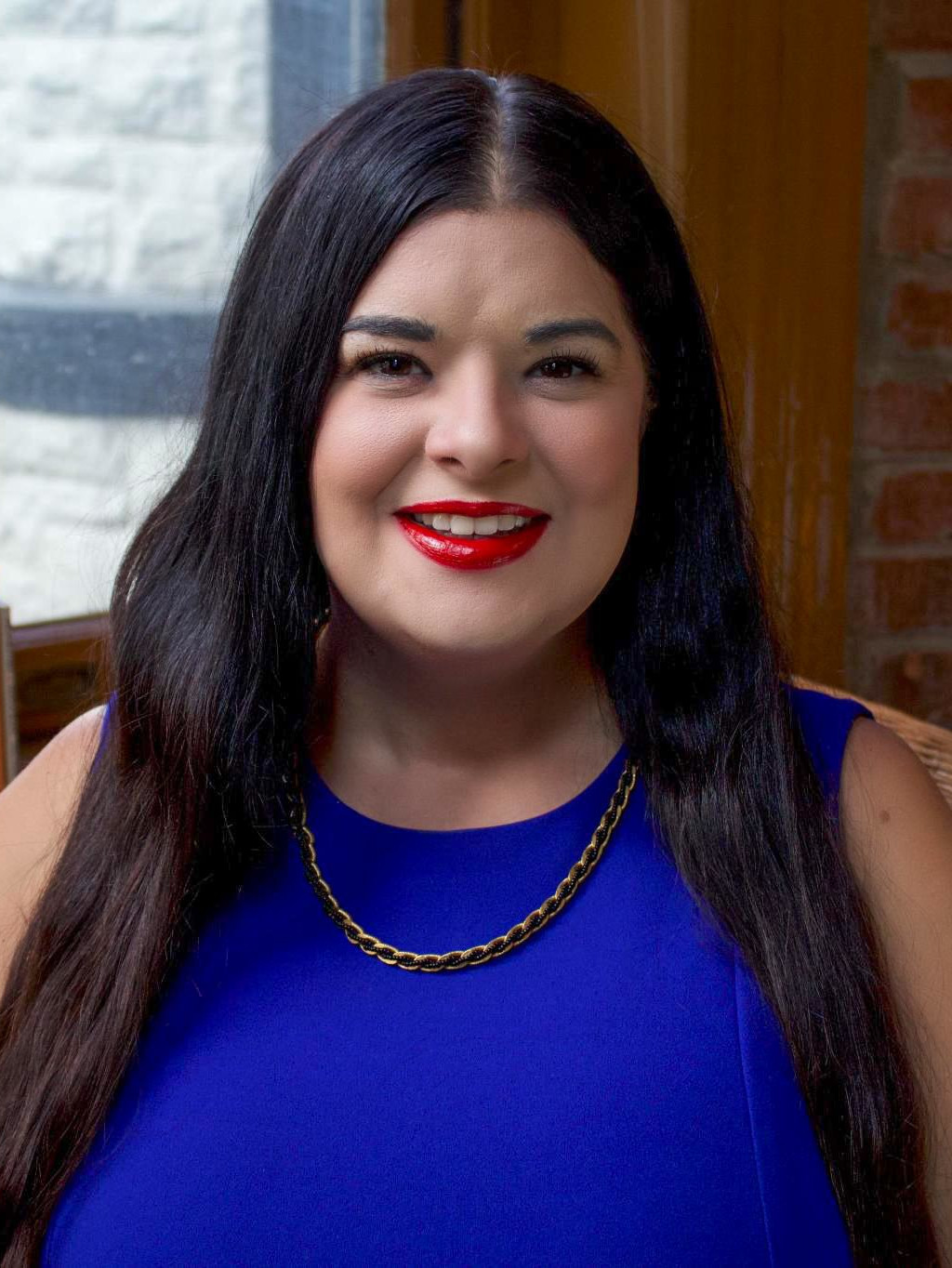
Terrisa Bukovinac, former president of Democrats for Life of America, founder of Pro-Life San Francisco, and the founder of the Progressive Anti-Abortion Uprising (PAAU) (withdrew June 17, 2024)

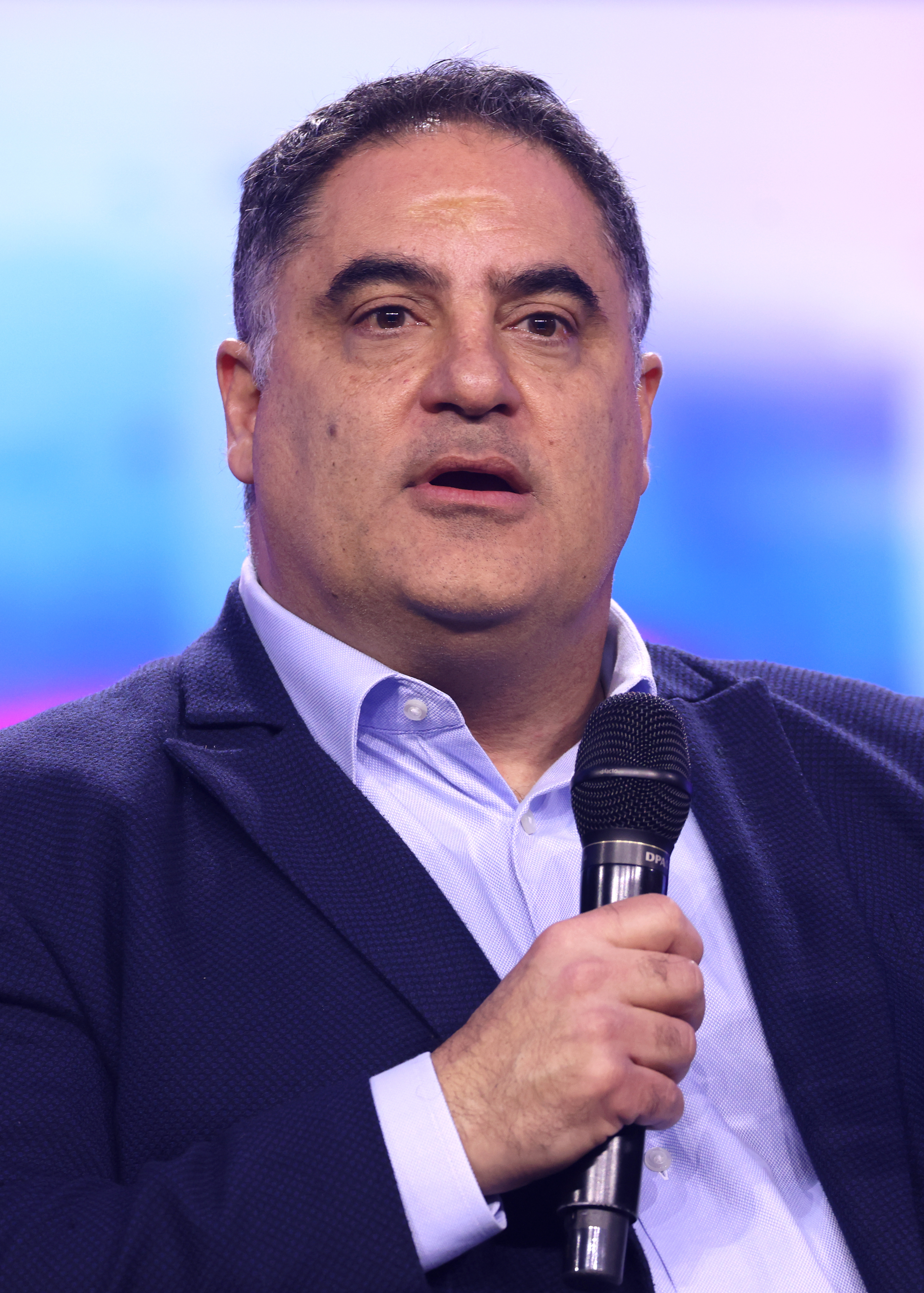
Cenk Uygur, co-creator of The Young Turks, co-founder of Justice Democrats, and Democrat candidate for CA-25 in 2020 (Note: Uygur is not eligible to serve as president as he is not a natural-born citizen, but he claims he can run for the office.) (withdrew March 6, 2024)

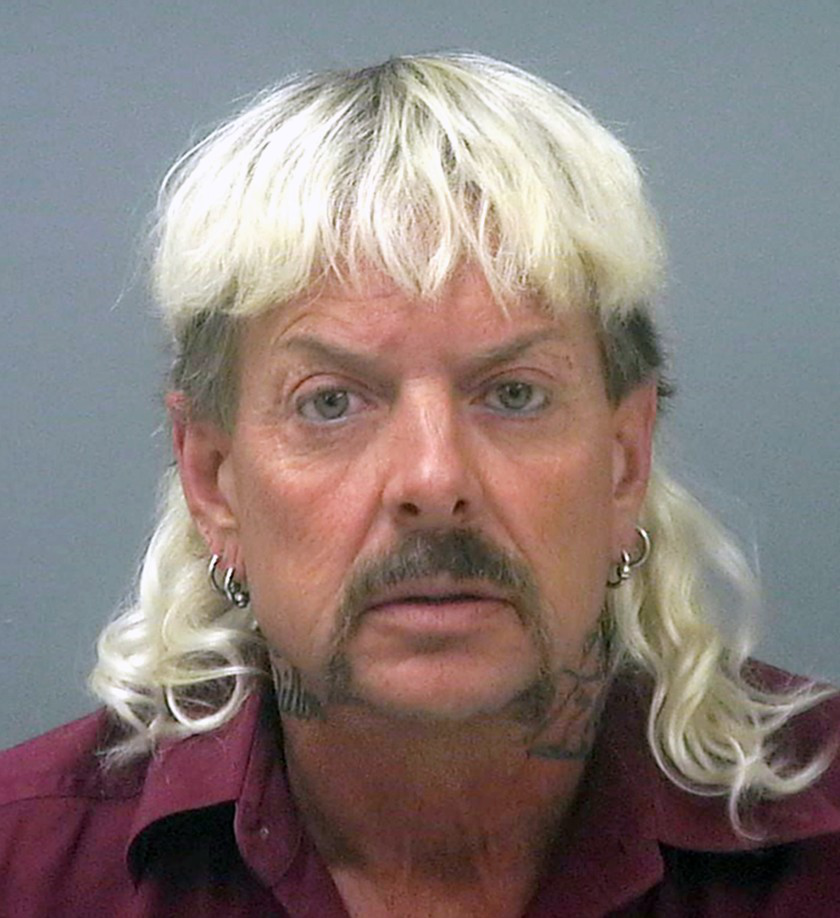
Joe Exotic, owner of the Greater Wynnewood Exotic Animal Park, subject of Tiger King(withdrew August 5, 2024, endorsed Donald Trump)

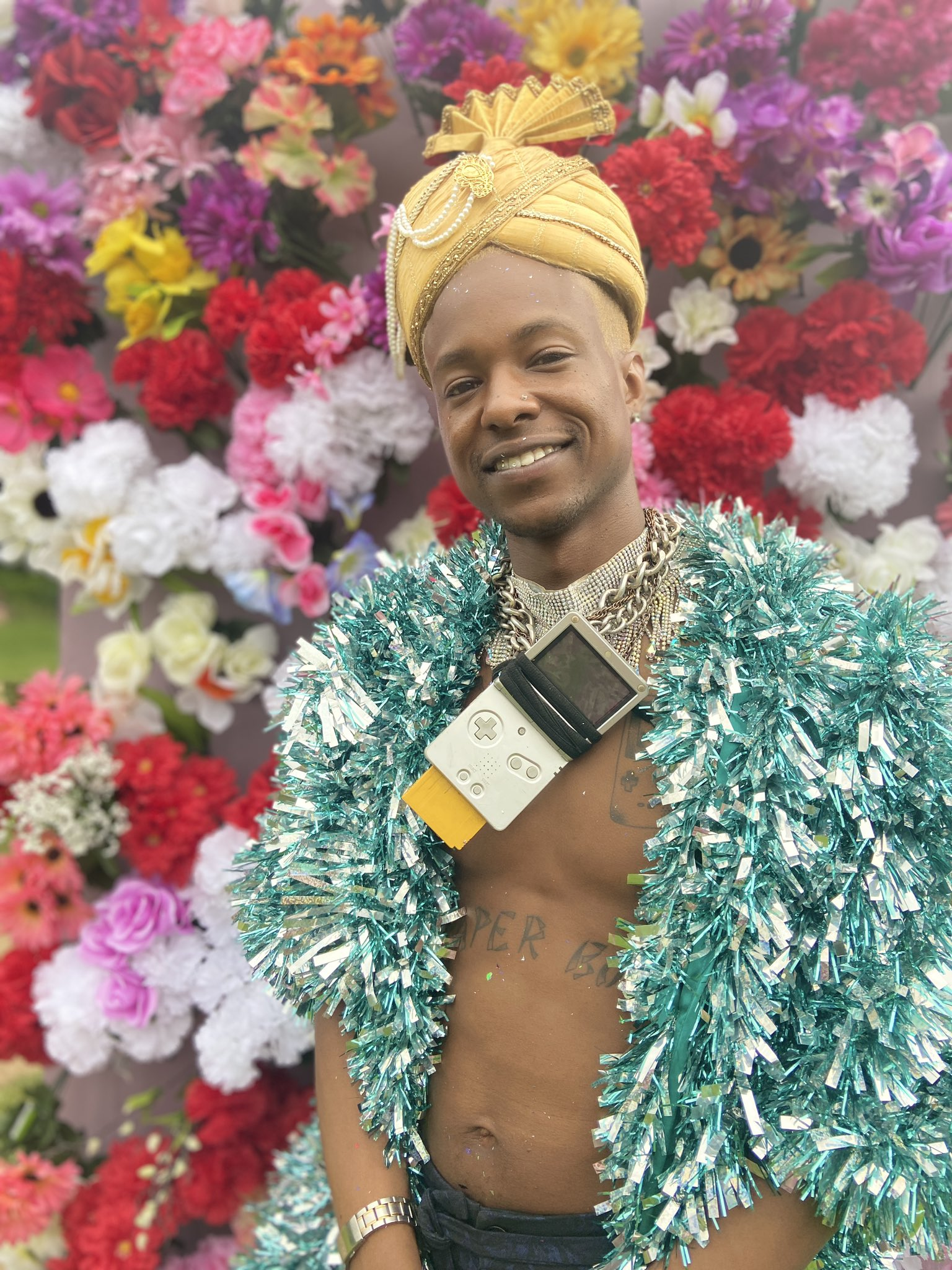
Paperboy Prince, artist and community activist

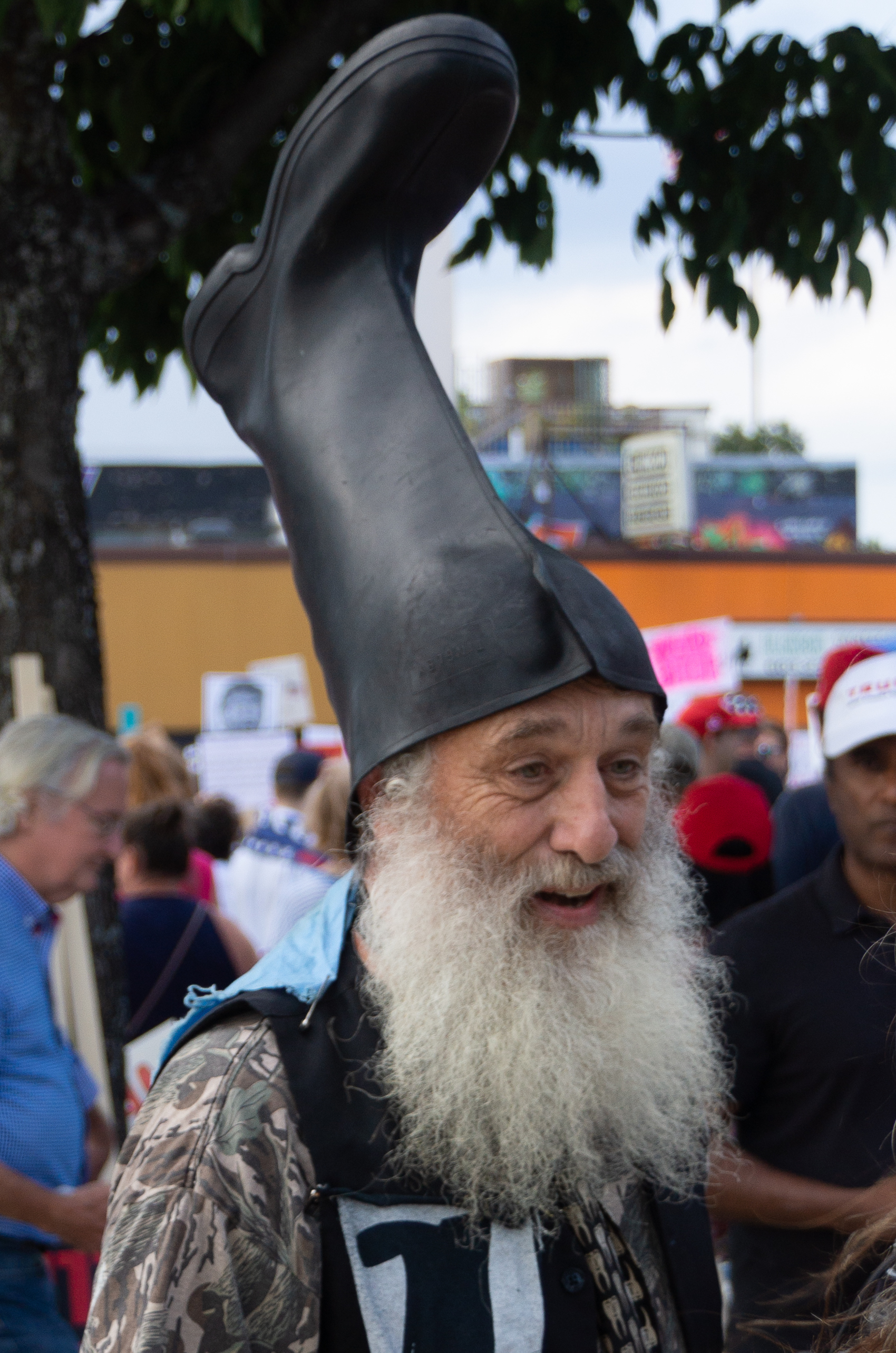
Vermin Supreme, performance artist, and activist; former Libertarian Party Judicial Committee member (2020–2022)
- Bob Ely, entrepreneur and former investment banker

=== Withdrew before the primaries ===
Major candidates who withdrew before the 2024 Democratic Party presidential primaries
Candidate	Born	Most recent position	Home state	Campaign announced	Campaign suspended	Campaign	Popular vote	Ref.
Robert F. Kennedy Jr.	January 17, 1954 (age 69); Washington, D.C.	Environmental lawyer	California	April 19, 2023	October 9, 2023 (ran as an independent, later endorsed Trump)	Campaign FEC filing Website	None	

==== Other candidates ====
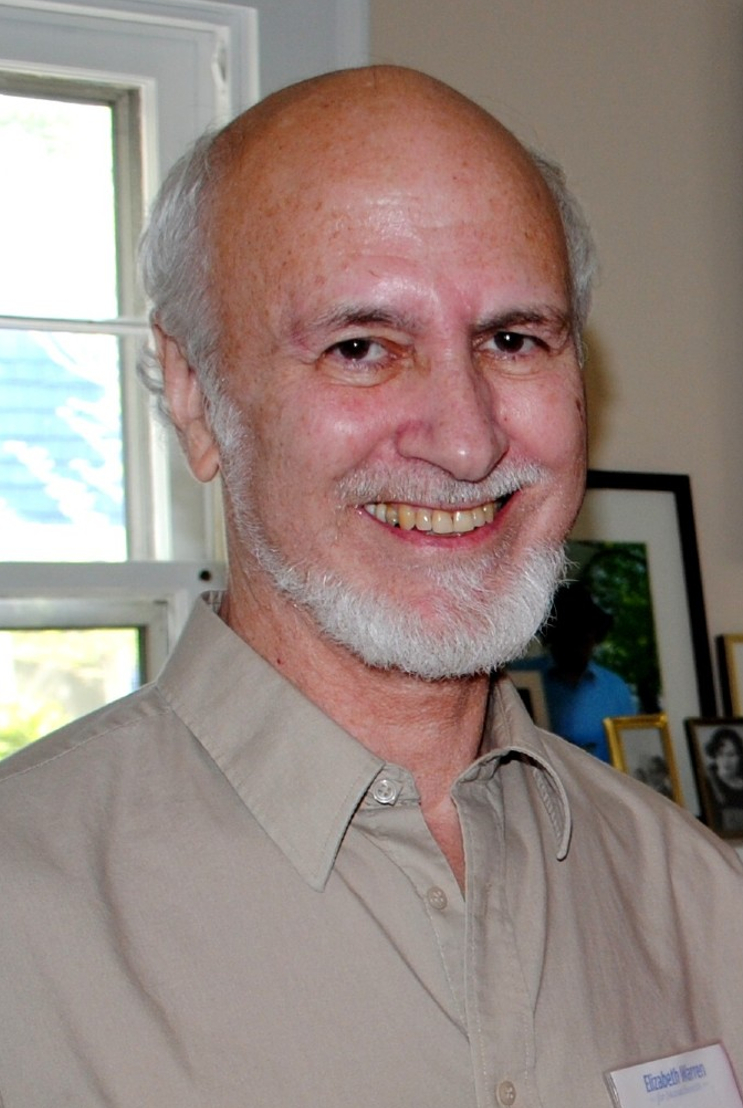
Jerome Segal, research scholar and Bread and Roses Party nominee for president in 2020 (ran for U.S. Senate in Maryland)

=== Candidate timetable ===
Active campaign	Exploratory committee	Democratic National Convention
Withdrawn candidate	Primaries	Democratic National Convention

== Primaries and caucus calendar ==
2024 Democratic Party presidential primaries, rules Open primary Semi-closed primary Closed primary Canceled

Caucuses and primaries in the 2024 Democratic Party presidential primaries
Date	Total delegates		Primaries/caucuses
January 23	0		New Hampshire primary (state-run) (Note: New Hampshire's delegates will not be awarded through this unofficial primary. The early date violates the DNC-approved calendar, which confirmed South Carolina as the first primary state.)
February 3	55		South Carolina primary
February 6	36		Nevada primary
February 27	117		Michigan primary
March 5 (Super Tuesday)	1420		
March 5 (Super Tuesday)	1420	52	Alabama primary
March 5 (Super Tuesday)	1420	6	American Samoa caucuses
March 5 (Super Tuesday)	1420	31	Arkansas primary
March 5 (Super Tuesday)	1420	424	California primary
March 5 (Super Tuesday)	1420	72	Colorado primary
March 5 (Super Tuesday)	1420	40	Iowa caucuses (Note: Iowa's delegates were awarded through mail-in voting.)
March 5 (Super Tuesday)	1420	24	Maine primary
March 5 (Super Tuesday)	1420	92	Massachusetts primary
March 5 (Super Tuesday)	1420	75	Minnesota primary
March 5 (Super Tuesday)	1420	116	North Carolina primary
March 5 (Super Tuesday)	1420	36	Oklahoma primary
March 5 (Super Tuesday)	1420	63	Tennessee primary
March 5 (Super Tuesday)	1420	244	Texas primary
March 5 (Super Tuesday)	1420	30	Utah primary
March 5 (Super Tuesday)	1420	16	Vermont primary
March 5 (Super Tuesday)	1420	99	Virginia primary
March 6	22		Hawaii caucuses
March 12	254		
March 12	254	13	Democrats Abroad primary
March 12	254	108	Georgia primary
March 12	254	35	Mississippi primary
March 12	254	6	Northern Marianas caucuses
March 12	254	92	Washington primary
March 19	379	72	Arizona primary
March 19	379	147	Illinois primary
March 19	379	33	Kansas primary
March 19	379	127	Ohio primary
March 23	112		
March 23	112	48	Louisiana primary
March 23	112	64	Missouri primary
March 30	13		North Dakota primary
April 2	436		
April 2	436	60	Connecticut primary
April 2	436	268	New York primary
April 2	436	26	Rhode Island primary
April 2	436	82	Wisconsin primary
April 13	28	15	Alaska caucuses
April 13	28	13	Wyoming caucuses
April 23	159		Pennsylvania primary
April 27	25		New Hampshire primary (party-run)
April 28	55		Puerto Rico primary
May 7	79		Indiana primary
May 14	144		
May 14	144	95	Maryland primary
May 14	144	29	Nebraska primary
May 14	144	20	West Virginia primary
May 21	119		
May 21	119	53	Kentucky primary
May 21	119	66	Oregon primary
May 23	23		Idaho caucuses
June 4	216		
June 4	216	20	Washington D.C. primary
June 4	216	20	Montana primary
June 4	216	126	New Jersey primary
June 4	216	34	New Mexico primary
June 4	216	16	South Dakota primary
June 8	14		
June 8	14	7	Guam caucuses
June 8	14	7	Virgin Islands caucuses

- Canceled: Florida (224 delegates), (Note: Originally scheduled for March 19. The state party only nominated Joe Biden as a candidate, canceling the primary.) Delaware (19 delegates) (Note: Originally scheduled for April 2. Only Joe Biden made the primary ballot, canceling the primary.)

== Ballot access ==
The following is a table of which candidates received ballot access in which states in the Democratic Party primaries.

Yes indicates that the candidate was on the ballot for the primary contest.
indicates that the candidate was a recognized write-in candidate.
No indicates that the candidate did not appear on the ballot in that state's contest.
indicates that a candidate withdrew before the election but was still listed on the ballot.

Ballot access in the 2024 Democratic presidential nominating contests
Contest	Date	Biden	Palmer	Williamson	Phillips	Others	Uncommitted (Note: Includes "None of These Candidates" in Nevada; "noncommitted delegate" in Colorado; "no preference" in Massachusetts, Montana, and North Carolina; "undeclared" in Wyoming; "none of the names shown" in Kansas; "uninstructed delegation" in Wisconsin.)
New Hampshire (state-run) (Note: This primary did not award any delegates.)	Jan 23	Write-in	Yes	Yes	Yes	Yes (Note: "President": R. Boddie, Terrisa Bukovinac, Eban Cambridge, Gabriel Cornejo, Mark Stewart Greenstein, Tom Koos, Paul V. LaCava, Star Locke, Frankie Lozada, Stephen P. Lyons, Raymond Michael Moroz, Derek Nadeau, Mando Perez-Serrato, Donald Picard, Paperboy Love Prince, Richard Rist, Vermin Supreme, John Vail Received votes as a write-in not counted as "scatter": Nikki Haley (running as a Republican), Donald Trump (running as a Republican), Vivek Ramaswamy (ran as a Republican), Ron DeSantis (ran as a Republican), Chris Christie (ran as a Republican), Robert F. Kennedy Jr. (running as an Independent), CeaseFire (not a candidate), Bernie Sanders (not a candidate))	No
South Carolina	Feb 3	Yes	No	Yes	Yes	No	No
Nevada	Feb 6	Yes	Yes	Yes	No	Yes (Note: Gabriel Cornejo, Superpayaseria Crystalroc, Brent Foutz, John Haywood, Stephen Alan Leon, Frankie Lozada, Stephen Lyons, Armando Perez-Serrato, Donald Picard, Mark R. Prascak)	Yes
Michigan	Feb 27	Yes	No	Yes-withdrawn	Yes	No	Yes
Alabama	Mar 5	Yes	No	No	Yes	No	Yes
American Samoa	Mar 5	Yes	Yes	No	Yes	No	No
Arkansas	Mar 5	Yes	No	Yes	Yes	Yes (Note: Frank Lozada, Stephen Lyons, Armando Perez-Serrato)	No
California	Mar 5	Yes	No	Yes	Yes	Yes (Note: "President": R. Boddie, Eban Cambridge, Gabriel Cornejo, Stephen P. Lyons, Armando "Mando" Perez-Serrato Recognized write-in candidates: Willie Felix Carter, President Cristina Nicole Grappo, Richard Gutierrez, James Mark Merts, Reed Michaelsen, Wayne Anthony Pope Sr.)	No
Colorado	Mar 5	Yes	Yes	Yes	Yes	Yes (Note: Gabriel Cornejo, Frankie Lozada, Stephen P. Lyons, Armando "Mando" Perez-Serrato)	Yes
Iowa (Note: Iowa is holding an all mail-in caucus due to DNC rules. Mail-in voting occurs from January 12 to March 5.)	Mar 5	Yes	No	Yes	Yes	No	Yes
Maine	Mar 5	Yes	No	No	Yes	No	No
Massachusetts	Mar 5	Yes	No	Yes	Yes	No	Yes
Minnesota	Mar 5	Yes	Yes	Yes	Yes	Yes (Note: Eban Cambridge, Gabriel Cornejo, Frankie Lozada, Armando "Mando" Perez-Serrato, Cenk Uygur (Note: Uygur is not eligible to be president under the natural-born citizen clause of the United States Constitution.))	Yes
North Carolina	Mar 5	Yes	No	No	No	No	Yes
Oklahoma	Mar 5	Yes	No	Yes	Yes	Yes (Note: Stephen Lyons, Armando "Mando" Perez-Serrato, Cenk Uygur)	No
Tennessee	Mar 5	Yes	No	No	No	No	Yes
Texas	Mar 5	Yes	No	Yes	Yes	Yes (Note: Gabriel A. Cornejo, Robert Star Locke, Frankie Lozada, Armando "Mando" Perez-Serrato, Cenk Uygur)	No
Utah	Mar 5	Yes	No	Yes	Yes	Yes (Note: Gabriel Cornejo, Frank Lozada)	No
Vermont	Mar 5	Yes	Yes	Yes	Yes	Yes (Note: Mark Stewart Greenstein, Cenk Uygur)	No
Virginia	Mar 5	Yes	No	Yes	Yes	No	No
Hawaii	Mar 6	Yes	Yes	Yes	Yes	Yes (Note: Armando "Mando" Perez-Serrato)	Yes
Democrats Abroad (Note: Voting runs from March 5 to March 12.)	Mar 12	Yes	No	Yes	No	No	Yes
Georgia	Mar 12	Yes	No	Yes	Yes-withdrawn	No	No
Mississippi	Mar 12	Yes	No	No	No	No	No
Northern Mariana Islands	Mar 12	Yes	Yes	Yes	Yes-withdrawn	No	No
Washington	Mar 12	Yes	No	Yes	Yes-withdrawn	No	Yes
Arizona	Mar 19	Yes	Yes	Yes	Yes-withdrawn	(Note: Gabriel Cornejo, Frankie Lozada, Stephen Lyons)	No
Illinois	Mar 19	Yes	No	Yes	Yes-withdrawn	(Note: Frankie Lozada)	No
Kansas	Mar 19	Yes	Yes	Yes	Yes-withdrawn	No	Yes
Ohio	Mar 19	Yes	No	No	Yes-withdrawn	No	No
Louisiana	Mar 23	Yes	No	Yes	Yes-withdrawn	Yes (Note: "Bob" Ely, Frankie Lozada, Stephen Lyons, Armando "Mando" Perez-Serrato, Cenk Uygur)	No
Missouri	Mar 23	Yes	Yes	Yes	Yes-withdrawn	Yes (Note: Stephen Lyons, Armando "Mando" Perez-Serrato)	Yes
North Dakota	Mar 30	Yes	Yes	Yes	Yes-withdrawn	Yes (Note: Eban Cambridge, Stephen P. Lyons, Armando “Mando” Perez-Serrato, Cenk Uygur)	No
Connecticut	Apr 2	Yes	No	Yes	Yes-withdrawn	(Note: Cenk Uygur)	Yes
New York	Apr 2	Yes	No	Yes	Yes-withdrawn	No	No
Rhode Island	Apr 2	Yes	No	No	Yes-withdrawn	No	Yes
Wisconsin	Apr 2	Yes	No	No	Yes-withdrawn	No	Yes
Alaska	Apr 13	Yes	No	No	No	No	No
Wyoming	Apr 13	Yes	Yes	Yes	Yes-withdrawn	Yes (Note: Stephen Lyons, David Michael Olscamp, Armando “Mando” Perez-Serrato)	Yes
Pennsylvania	Apr 23	Yes	No	No	Yes-withdrawn	No	No
New Hampshire (party-run)	Apr 27	Yes	No	No	No	No	No
Puerto Rico	Apr 28	Yes	No	Yes	Yes-withdrawn	No	No
Indiana	May 7	Yes	No	No	No	No	No
Maryland	May 14	Yes	No	Yes	Yes-withdrawn	No	Yes
Nebraska	May 14	Yes	No	No	Yes-withdrawn	No	No
West Virginia	May 14	Yes	Yes	No	Yes-withdrawn	Yes (Note: Stephen P. Lyons, Armando “Mando” Perez-Serrato)	No
Kentucky	May 21	Yes	No	Yes	Yes-withdrawn	No	Yes
Oregon	May 21	Yes	No	Yes	No	No	No
Idaho	May 23	Yes	Yes	Yes	Yes-withdrawn	Yes (Note: David Michael Olscamp)	No
District of Columbia	Jun 4	Yes	No	Yes	No	Yes (Note: Armando “Mando” Perez-Serrato)	Yes
Montana	Jun 4	Yes	No	No	No	No	Yes
New Jersey	Jun 4	Yes	No	No	No	Yes (Note: Terrisa Bukovinac)	Yes
New Mexico	Jun 4	Yes	No	Yes	No	No	Yes
South Dakota	Jun 4	Yes	No	Yes	Yes-withdrawn	Yes (Note: Armando “Mando” Perez-Serrato Gabriel Cornejo filed for inclusion but withdrew before the ballot was finalized.)	No
Guam	Jun 8	Yes	No	No	No	No	No
Virgin Islands	Jun 8	Yes	No	Yes	No	No	Yes
Delaware	None (Note: Primary cancelled.)	Yes	No	No	No	No	No
Florida	None	Yes	No	No	No	No	No
Total possible delegates		3,949	471	2,747	3,044	Armando Perez-Serrato: 1,157; Stephen Lyons: 829; Frankie Lozada: 755	1,423

== Timeline ==
=== 2023 ===
==== February 2023 ====
On February 4, the Democratic National Committee approves a new primary calendar, moving South Carolina to February 3, followed by Nevada and New Hampshire on February 6, Georgia on February 13, and Michigan on February 27. Iowa, which traditionally goes first, would then be held later in the primary season. The DNC gives Georgia and New Hampshire an extended deadline of June to modify their state laws so they can comply with the new dates (New Hampshire state law mandates them to hold the first primary in the country, while Georgia state law requires them to hold both the Democratic and Republican primaries on the same day), but this remains unlikely to happen since both states have Republican-controlled state legislatures.

==== March 2023 ====
On March 3, the DNC declares their full support for President Biden's re-election, stating they do not plan to host any official debates.

On March 4, author Marianne Williamson announces her campaign for the Democratic presidential nomination as the first major primary challenger to incumbent President Biden.

==== April 2023 ====
On April 6, Robert F. Kennedy Jr. files to challenge Biden in the 2024 Democratic primary.

The same day, the Idaho Legislature passes House Bill 138, moving the state's presidential primary date to May while also eliminating the original primary date in March.

On April 11, the Democratic Party announces that its convention will be held in Chicago, Illinois.

On April 19, Robert F. Kennedy Jr., environmental lawyer and son of Robert F. Kennedy, formally announces his presidential campaign in a launch event in Boston.

On April 25, incumbent Democratic President Joe Biden announces his bid for re-election in 2024.

==== June 2023 ====
On June 4, Robert F. Kennedy Jr.'s Instagram account is reinstated after it was suspended in February 2021 for sharing misinformation about the COVID-19 vaccine.

On June 11, a Suffolk University poll finds that 8 in 10 Democratic voters would like to see Biden debate other Democratic primary candidates.

On June 15, in an interview on The Joe Rogan Experience, Kennedy raises the belief that he could be assassinated by the Central Intelligence Agency.

On June 17, President Joe Biden begins his campaign at a rally in Philadelphia.

==== September 2023 ====
On September 12, Speaker of the House Kevin McCarthy announces an impeachment inquiry into Joe Biden, alleging that he benefited from business dealings with his son Hunter.

On September 14, Hunter Biden is indicted on three firearm-related charges returned by a federal grand jury in Wilmington, Delaware.

On September 16, an armed man impersonating a U.S. Marshal is arrested at a Robert Kennedy Jr. campaign event in Los Angeles.

==== October 2023 ====
On October 6, the DNC reaches a compromise with the Iowa Democratic Party, allowing the Iowa Democratic caucuses to be held first on January 15, 2024, but voting on presidential candidates would also be done via mail-in ballots until Super Tuesday, March 5, 2024.

On October 9, Robert F. Kennedy Jr. withdraws from the Democratic primaries and launches an independent campaign.

On October 12, progressive commentator Cenk Uygur announces his presidential campaign. Despite his announcement, Uygur is ineligible to serve as president due to being born in Turkey to non U.S. citizens.

On October 16, the Biden campaign launches an account on Truth Social.

On October 24, with New Hampshire state officials moving forward in accordance with their state law mandating them to hold the first primary in the country, denying the DNC's request to hold it after South Carolina's, Biden campaign manager Julie Chávez Rodriguez states that he will not appear on the New Hampshire primary ballot.

On October 26, a man attempts to trespass on Robert F. Kennedy Jr.'s residence in Brentwood, Los Angeles, and is arrested by the Los Angeles Police Department.

The same day, U.S. Representative Dean Phillips files paperwork to run against President Biden for the Democratic nomination.

On October 27, Dean Phillips launches his presidential campaign in Concord, New Hampshire.

==== November 2023 ====
On November 13, The Nelson A. Rockefeller Center for Public Policy and the Social Sciences at Dartmouth College and the Dartmouth Political Union co-host a discussion as part of their "Path to the Presidency" speaker series with Dean Phillips to discuss his campaign and policy positions.

On November 15, the New Hampshire presidential primary date is set for January 23, 2024, defying the DNC's planned schedule.

On November 18, Dean Phillips discusses the case for his campaign at the 2023 Blue Jamboree rally hosted by the Charleston County Democratic Party in South Carolina.

On November 30, the Florida Democratic Party only submits Biden as a candidate to the Secretary of State of Florida, effectively canceling the state primary.

==== December 2023 ====
On December 2, Muslim American leaders launch the #AbandonBiden campaign in Dearborn, Michigan, as a response to Biden's handling of the Gaza war.

On December 4, Arkansas election officials rule that news personality Cenk Uygur, a naturalized citizen who was born in Turkey, could not appear on the state's Democratic presidential primary ballot despite his argument that the 14th Amendment of the Constitution makes him eligible to run for president.

On December 7, the Lesser-Known Candidates Forum was held at the New Hampshire Institute of Politics. Twenty minor candidates, both Republican and Democratic, were in attendance.

On December 23, Phillips argues that Biden should "thoughtfully exit" the 2024 race.

On December 30, the #AbandonBiden campaign announces plans to expand to all fifty states.

=== 2024 ===
==== January 2024 ====
On January 8, New England College hosts a debate between Williamson and Phillips in Manchester, New Hampshire.

On January 12, mail-in voting for the Democratic caucuses in Iowa begins.

And on the same day, United States Attorney General Merrick Garland appoints Robert Hur as special counsel in President Biden's handling of classified documents case.

On January 18, Phillips holds campaign events in Manchester and Hanover, New Hampshire, with 2020 Democratic Primary presidential candidate Andrew Yang.

The same day, Politico publishes an interview with Democratic Party presidential primary challenger Jason Palmer, in which he touted his status as the youngest Democratic presidential candidate and one of the youngest candidates in either party. He called on Biden and all older lawmakers to "pass the torch" to a younger generation of political leaders such as Gretchen Whitmer, Gavin Newsom, or Jared Polis.

On January 20, Phillips tells Axios that he thinks it would be "impossible" for Biden to do the job for four more years. And even being so blunt as to say, "At that stage of life, it is impossible ultimately to conduct, to prosecute the office of the American presidency in the way that this country in the world needs right now. That is an absolute truth."

On January 22, the New Hampshire attorney general's office begins investigating an audio deepfake robocall of President Biden that encouraged people not to vote in the state primary.

On January 23, President Biden wins the non-binding New Hampshire Democratic primary through write-in votes. Biden wins over 60% of the vote. Phillips also wins a significant number of votes, winning over 19% of the vote.

On January 27, President Biden and Congressman Phillips speak at the South Carolina Democratic Party's First-in-the-Nation Celebration dinner in Columbia, South Carolina.

On January 31, U.S. Senator Tina Smith sends a one-minute video to the Washington Press Club Foundation's annual congressional dinner "roasting" Representative Phillips over his campaign to challenge President Biden for the Democratic Party's nomination for president.

==== February 2024 ====
On February 2, the Wisconsin Supreme Court unanimously orders election officials to put Phillips on the presidential primary ballot after the Wisconsin Elections Commission had excluded him.

On February 3, President Biden wins the South Carolina Democratic primary.

On February 4, after his loss in the South Carolina primary, Phillips vowes to remain in the race as "a mission of principle".

On February 5, Special Counsel Robert Hur releases his report on Biden's handling of classified documents. He states that "no criminal charges are warranted" and that the probe "uncovered evidence that President Biden willfully retained and disclosed classified materials after his vice presidency when he was a private citizen."

On February 6, President Biden wins the Nevada Democratic primary.

On February 7, Marianne Williamson suspends her campaign.

On February 27, President Biden wins the Michigan Democratic primary.

On February 28, Marianne Williamson re-enters the race after the results of the Michigan primary.

==== March 2024 ====
On March 5, Super Tuesday President Biden wins fifteen states: Alabama, Arkansas, California, Colorado, Iowa, Maine, Massachusetts, Minnesota, North Carolina, Oklahoma, Tennessee, Texas, Utah, Vermont, and Virginia, while businessman Jason Palmer wins American Samoa.

On March 6, Dean Phillips suspends his campaign and endorses Biden. After the endorsement President Biden calls Phillips on the phone. Phillips says the two "had a wonderful conversation" that ended in an invitation to discuss the state of the 2024 race at the White House.

The same day, President Biden wins the Hawaii Democratic caucus.

On March 12, President Biden wins the Georgia, Mississippi, Northern Mariana Islands, and Washington primaries, clinching enough delegates to become the presumptive nominee of the Democratic Party.

On March 19, President Biden wins the Arizona, Florida, Illinois, Kansas, and Ohio primaries. Despite having already dropped out, Dean Phillips wins three delegates in the Ohio primary. Congressman Phillips was still on the ballot on election day and gained his delegates by meeting the 15% threshold of votes needed to receive a delegate in a congressional district in the state's 2nd, 6th, and 14th districts.

On March 23, President Biden wins the Louisiana and Missouri primaries.

On March 30, President Biden wins the North Dakota Democratic primary which is conducted almost entirely through mail-in ballots.

==== April 2024 ====
On April 2, President Biden wins the Connecticut, New York, Rhode Island, and Wisconsin. The Delaware Democratic presidential primary was canceled, with the delegates awarded to Biden.

On April 13, President Biden wins the Wyoming Democratic caucus and the Alaska Democratic primary.

On April 23, President Biden wins the Pennsylvania Democratic primary.

On April 27, President Biden wins all 25 of New Hampshire's pledged delegates in a party-backed firehouse primary held by the New Hampshire Democratic Party at Saint Anselm College's New Hampshire Institute of Politics.

On April 28, President Biden wins the Puerto Rico Democratic primary.

==== May 2024 ====
On May 7, President Biden wins the Indiana Democratic primary.

On May 14, President Biden wins the Maryland, Nebraska, and West Virginia primaries. Despite having already dropped out, Congressman Dean Phillips wins one delegate in the Nebraska primary by receiving the most votes of any candidate in Logan County.

On May 21, President Biden wins the Kentucky and Oregon primaries.

On May 23, President Biden wins the Idaho Democratic caucuses.

==== June 2024 ====
On June 4, President Biden wins the District of Columbia, Montana, New Jersey, New Mexico, and South Dakota primaries.

On June 8, President Biden wins the Guam and the U.S. Virgin Islands Democratic caucuses, the last nominating contests of the primary cycle.

On June 11, Marianne Williamson suspends her campaign for a second time.

On June 27, President Biden and former President Trump hold a general election debate hosted by CNN in Atlanta, prior to the nominating conventions.

==== July 2024 ====
On July 2, Marianne Williamson re-enters the race for a third time.

On July 15, the DNC sends an email asking delegates to indicate on a drop-down menu on who they will vote for: Joe Biden, Jason Palmer (who won American Samoa), Rep. Dean Phillips, or "uncommitted." Answers to that questionnaire reportedly essentially gave the DNC a whip count on how firm – or soft – support for Biden was among actual delegates.

On July 21, President Biden suspends his campaign. Vice President Kamala Harris announces her campaign and is immediately endorsed by Biden.

Also on July 21, Representative Dean Phillips proposes a straw poll of delegates ahead of the Democratic National Convention to determine the party's top four presidential contenders, who would then take part in four town halls outlining their platforms. After the town halls, the delegates would vote to choose the nominee.

On July 22, Senator Joe Manchin rules out a campaign for president, stating that he would have preferred an open convention.

Also on July 22, a majority of President Biden's pledged delegates pledge support for Harris, making her the presumptive nominee for the Democratic Party.

On July 23, U.S. House Representative Mary Peltola of Alaska's at-large congressional district and co-chair of the Blue Dog Coalition for the 118th Congress says "she has never endorsed anyone for president and does not intend to start with Harris."

On July 24, Jason Palmer releases his delegates and encouraged them to vote for Harris at the convention.

Also, on July 24, the Democratic National Committee votes to adopt new rules for an early virtual nomination vote in the first week of August. The new rules allow superdelegates to vote during the signature collection and on the first ballot of a virtual roll call for the presidential nomination without a candidate having won an overwhelming majority of pledged delegates earned by them in the primaries.

On July 25, U.S. House Representative Jared Golden of Maine's 2nd congressional district and co-chair of the Blue Dog Coalition for the 118th Congress tells Axios he would "absolutely not" commit to voting for the Democratic presidential nominee Kamala Harris in November and is "going to wait and see what she puts forward and what her vision for the future of the country is.".

On July 26, U.S. House Representative Marie Gluesenkamp Perez of Washington's 3rd congressional district and co-chair of the Blue Dog Coalition for the 118th Congress says that she has "no plans" to endorse Harris. Perez was the last of the three members in the Blue Dog Coalition caucus's leadership, who publicly announced that they were not endorsing Harris for president.

On July 29, Marianne Williamson ends her candidacy for the third and final time.

==== August 2024 ====
On August 2, Vice President Kamala Harris earns a majority of delegate votes in the DNC roll call.

On August 3, the Minnesota Star Tribune reports that Phillips said, "If people write anything, I just hope that they might write if [Biden] had debated me then and he had been on one stage, unscripted, with a national audience, and he demonstrated that decline then, this would have been very different circumstances." He continued, "And that's what I was trying to do."

On August 4, twenty-nine Uncommitted delegates from eight states take part in a virtual roll call where they vote for Palestinian victims over Harris.

On August 5, delegate voting closes, and Vice President Kamala Harris becomes the official presidential nominee for the Democratic Party. 52 delegates vote abstained or vote against Harris, including Representative Mary Peltola, Representative Jared Golden, and Senator Jon Tester.

On August 6, Harris chooses Governor Tim Walz as her vice presidential running mate.

== Controversies ==
=== Primary schedule ===
President Biden sent a letter on December 1, 2022, to the Democratic National Committee (DNC), requesting that diversity should be emphasized in the 2024 Democratic Party presidential primaries. On February 4, 2023, the DNC formally approved the new 2024 primary calendar, moving South Carolina to hold its race first on February 3, followed by Nevada and New Hampshire on February 6. One member of the Rules and Bylaws Committee who supported this new plan, Lee Saunders, further said it will give a better representation of the composition of the country. Members of the Iowa Democratic Party and the New Hampshire Democratic Party opposed the move, since they would no longer be the first two states to hold their races. The move was also criticized by some progressives, who argued that the move was intended to benefit more moderate candidates. On October 6, the DNC and the Iowa Democratic Party reached a compromise in which the in-person caucuses could still be held in January, but delegate-determining mail-in voting would be held through Super Tuesday, March 5.

The DNC and the New Hampshire Democratic Party initially did not reach a compromise. In October 2023, the manager for the Biden campaign, Julie Chávez Rodriguez, confirmed in a letter to the chair of the New Hampshire Democratic Party Raymond Buckley that Biden would not appear on the primary ballot in order to comply with the DNC's calendar. Pro-Biden New Hampshire Democrats, including Kathy Sullivan (the former chairwoman of the state Democratic party) and former Representatives Paul Hodes and Carol Shea-Porter, launched a formal write-in campaign on October 30. There were no delegates at stake in the New Hampshire primary because the Democratic National Committee said state party officials violated national party rules by scheduling its contest earlier than allowed. On January 8, 2024, after the Democratic national party dismissed the state of New Hampshire's upcoming primary as "meaningless" the New Hampshire Assistant Attorney General Brendan O’Donnell fired off a cease-and-desist order to the DNC, saying that instructing state Democrats to "educate the public" that the primary is "meaningless" violates the state's voter suppression laws. Biden still won the state's primary on January 23 as a write-in candidate. The New Hampshire Democratic Party later ran a firehouse primary before their official delegate selection meeting on April 27 to gain back their 25 delegates, in which a few dozens of registered party members from the state party committee voted and Biden was the only candidate on the ballot. The event was considered a token process to fulfill rules and largely not taken serious even by participants, but it was seen as an important decision in the context of the subsequent primary calendar for 2028. Accordingly, all delegates were allowed to be seated at the national convention following a vote by the DNC Rules and Bylaw Committee on April 30.

=== Ballot access denials ===
The primaries in Florida and Delaware were canceled, with Biden receiving all pledged delegates, while in Alaska, North Carolina, Tennessee, Mississippi, and Indiana, no candidates other than Biden appeared on the ballot, partially due to decisions by the state Democratic parties in those states. In Guam, voters could only cast ballots for individuals elected to serve as national convention delegates, all of whom were pledged to support Biden. The Phillips and Williamson campaigns criticized many of the decisions as undemocratic. The primary challengers had not received the necessary number of signatures in Tennessee and North Carolina, while the Florida Democratic Party stated that the challengers did not reach out to them until November 29, 2023, one day before the Florida Secretary of State's November 30 deadline to submit candidates, and the state party had already made its submission ahead of the deadline before November 29. An attorney who supported Phillips (Note: The attorney, Michael Steinberg, represented himself independently in the interest of getting Phillips on the ballot; he was not appointed by Phillips.) questioned why the state party did not contact the challengers when it made its submission ahead of the deadline. Andrew Yang who was assisting Phillips' cause told ABC News, "What's happening in Florida is important -- do we live in a democracy or not? If the Democrats can simply cancel their own primaries they should change their name to something else." On February 2, the Wisconsin Supreme Court unanimously ruled that election officials must include Phillips on the presidential primary ballot in Wisconsin. Phillips won his lawsuit against State Justice Department attorneys representing the elections commission who were attempting to keep him off the ballot.

=== Biden's participation ===
Despite no incumbent president ever having participated in a primary season debate, a June 2023 poll by USA Today and Suffolk University found that 8 in 10 Democratic voters wanted to see Biden debate the other major Democratic candidates. Among Biden supporters, 72% said they would like to see him debate in the primaries with other major Democratic candidates. Despite all this, the DNC did not support hosting any official debates, and Biden did not participate in the 2024 Democratic Party presidential debates and forums unsanctioned by the DNC.

=== Challengers having difficulties ===
On May 5, 2023, Symone Sanders, the former spokesperson for Vice President Kamala Harris, stated on MSNBC: "The Democratic National Committee will not facilitate a primary process [in 2024]. There will be no debate stage for Robert Kennedy or Marianne Williamson or anybody else."

Phillips accused representatives of the Biden campaign of using access to pressure liberal media outlets into blackballing and not platforming him. The New York Times reported that during his campaign, Phillips "found himself “deplatformed,” taken off the ballot in some states, and rarely invited on television to make his case." Phillips argued that the Democratic establishment was choking off his challenge because it couldn't accept that ‘Biden is going to get creamed’ by Trump in November. Phillips also accused the Democratic National Committee of actively obstructing Democrats and Independents from ballot access — "bleeding campaigns dry" by handing out lawsuits against non-incumbent candidates and "absurd signature requirements." When asserting that his campaign was hampered by ballot access policies and a lack of candidate debates, Phillips issued an apology to Bernie Sanders. He regretted his previous disbelief in Sanders's 2016 campaign's complaints of biased rules by the DNC governing the presidential primary and admitted that he now thought Sanders was right.

Phillips also argued that Democrats who had concerns about President Biden were "suppressed and disenfranchised" during the 2024 primaries. Phillips said that the DNC's letter stating that New Hampshire's presidential primary was 'meaningless' and not to seat any delegates to the convention based on the results was, "one of the most egregious affronts to democracy that I’ve ever seen in my entire lifetime as an American, period." In a statement to Politico, Phillips called the handling of the primary process by the Florida Democratic Party a "blatant act of electoral corruption" and demanded Biden "condemn and immediately address" it. He also said "Americans would expect the absence of democracy in Tehran, not Tallahassee. The intentional disenfranchisement of voters runs counter to everything for which our Democratic Party and country stand. Our mission as Democrats is to defeat authoritarians, not become them." During an appearance on Meet the Press NOW, Phillips criticized Biden's re-election effort, stating that "The president is not a threat to democracy, but running and suppressing other candidates is a threat when you are behind in the polls, like he is." Phillips also added, "He’s a good man and someone I respect. But this delusion that he can win is a threat to democracy."

Kennedy accused the Democratic Party of "fixing the process so it makes it almost impossible to have democracy function" and "disenfranchising the Democratic voters from having any choice in who becomes the Democratic nominee."

Kennedy's campaign manager, former Ohio Democratic congressman Dennis Kucinich, accused the DNC of attempting a "hidden-ball trick" by not publicizing a public meeting of the Rules and Bylaws committee where resolutions dealing with ballot access and delegate selection rules for Georgia, Iowa, New Hampshire, and other states were expected to be presented. In a release, Kucinich said, "The DNC wants to carry on without public and media attention."

Williamson accused the Democratic National Committee of trying to "suppress" her candidacy in favor of incumbent President Joe Biden.

Former Secretary of housing and urban development Julian Castro alleged on MSNBC that potential Democratic rivals and even staffers "got the message" that their careers would be "blackballed" if they challenged Biden in the 2024 Democratic Party presidential primaries.

=== Process following Biden's withdrawal ===
With Biden out, on July 21, 2024, Phillips proposed a straw poll of delegates ahead of the Democratic National Convention to determine the party's top four presidential contenders. Those four candidates would then take part in four town halls outlining their plans for the White House. Then, after all those town halls, the delegates would vote to choose their candidate to determine the nominee.

Following Biden's suspension of his campaign and subsequent endorsement of Kamala Harris on July 21, Williamson called for an open convention, arguing that the vice president should not be "anointed to the position of nominee."

On July 23, Black Lives Matter released a statement opposing the party's decision to nominate Harris for president without her participating as a candidate in a primary election, describing the process as "anointing" Harris as the nominee without a public vote. The organization argued that installing Harris as the Democratic nominee without a primary vote undermined democratic principles, stating that such a move "would make the modern Democratic Party a party of hypocrites." BLM called on the Democratic National Committee to host a virtual primary to allow voter participation in the nomination process.

Representative Nancy Pelosi told Semafor on September 18 that Harris earned her spot atop the Democratic presidential ticket because "We had an open primary, and she won it. Nobody else got in the race." However, in the aftermath of the presidential election, Pelosi blamed Harris's loss on Biden's late exit and the lack of an open Democratic primary.

In May 2025, Senator Amy Klobuchar of Minnesota told NBC News that the Democratic Party would have been "better served by a primary" in 2024 as she reflected on Biden suspending his re-election campaign and endorsing Harris just months before the election.

== Vice-presidential candidate selection ==
On January 19, 2022, President Biden confirmed that Vice President Kamala Harris would again be his running mate in his 2024 re-election campaign. Some Democrats expressed skepticism about Biden choosing Harris again as his running mate, as she had also seen similar low approval ratings to Biden. In January 2023, U.S. Senator Elizabeth Warren said in a radio interview that she supported Biden's reelection bid, but stopped short of supporting Harris. She later clarified her position, saying she supported the Biden–Harris ticket.

Following Biden's withdrawal from the race in late July, it was reported that the Harris campaign was vetting nearly a dozen candidates to be her running mate. Several governors, including J.B. Pritzker of Illinois, Andy Beshear of Kentucky, Roy Cooper of North Carolina, Josh Shapiro of Pennsylvania, and Gretchen Whitmer of Michigan, were considered top contenders. Also under consideration were U.S. Senator Mark Kelly of Arizona, U.S. Secretary of Transportation Pete Buttigieg of Indiana, and U.S. Secretary of Commerce Gina Raimondo of Rhode Island. According to Mark Cuban, the Harris campaign reached out to him to express interest in vetting him for the position, but he declined.

On August 1, NBC News and The New York Times reported that Harris's final shortlist included Andy Beshear, Pete Buttigieg, Mark Kelly, J. B. Pritzker, Josh Shapiro, and Tim Walz. On August 6, 2024, Harris chose Tim Walz to be her running mate.

== Debates and forums ==
On December 6, 2023, TYT Network hosted a forum featuring primary candidates Williamson, Phillips and Uygur. Biden was invited but declined to attend. The candidates responded to the GOP debate being held in Tuscaloosa, which was scheduled to end at the same time. The discussion was moderated by John Iadarola, the main host of The Damage Report on the same network.

On January 8, 2024, Williamson and Phillips participated in a debate hosted by New England College in Manchester, New Hampshire. To qualify, candidates needed to be registered on the New Hampshire primary ballot and poll at more than five percent. The debate was broadcast on satellite radio by SiriusXM and was moderated by Josh McElveen, who was the former political director of WMUR.

On January 12, 2024, NewsNation hosted a second forum featuring Williamson, Phillips and Uygur. Biden was invited but did not attend. The discussion was moderated by Dan Abrams.

On January 18, 2024, Free & Equal Elections Foundation hosted a debate at Chelsea Television Studios in New York City. The debate was originally planned to be held in Los Angeles. Christina Tobin moderated the debate. All candidates registered for the ballot "in at least four states" were invited: Biden, Phillips, Williamson, Uygur, Gabriel Cornejo, Stephen Lyons, Jason Palmer, and Frank Lozada. However, only the latter four candidates chose to participate.

On January 19, 2024, Phillips and Williamson were part of a forum held at the Artisan Hotel in Tuscan Village, Salem, New Hampshire. It was hosted by the Rotary Club and the Southern New Hampshire Chamber of Commerce.

== Endorsements ==
Kamala Harris
Joe Biden (withdrawn)
Dean Phillips (withdrawn)

State representatives

- Tom Schamberg, New Hampshire state representative from the 4th district, Merrimack (2012–2014, 2018–present)
- Steve Shurtleff, New Hampshire state representative from the 11th district, Merrimack (2004–present) and former speaker of the New Hampshire House of Representatives (2018–2020) (later endorsed Biden)

Individuals

- Bill Ackman, Pershing Square Capital Management CEO
- Jason Calacanis, angel investor and podcaster
- Neal Khosla, son of Vinod Khosla and CEO of Curai Health
- Jed McCaleb, entrepreneur and philanthropist
- Michael Novogratz, CEO of Galaxy Investment Partners
- Steve Schmidt, political and corporate strategist (campaign advisor)
- Jeffrey P. Weaver, political strategist and former campaign manager for Bernie Sanders (campaign advisor)
- Andrew Yang, entrepreneur, candidate for president of the United States in 2020, candidate for mayor of New York City in 2021, founder of the Forward Party (Forward)

Newspapers

- Conway Daily Sun
- The Detroit News
- New Hampshire Union Leader
Marianne Williamson (withdrawn)

State senators

- Kendra Anderson, former Rhode Island state senator from the 31st district (2021–2023)
- Cynthia Mendes, former Rhode Island state senator from the 18th district (2021–2023)

State representatives

- Tony Labranche, former Democratic New Hampshire state representative from the 22nd district, Hillsborough (2020–2022) (Independent)
- Maria Perez, New Hampshire state representative from the 43rd district, Hillsborough (2020–present), vice chair of the National Hispanic Caucus of State Legislators (Independent)
- Robin Vogt, former New Hampshire state representative from the 21st district, Rockingham (2022–2023) (national volunteer coordinator)
- Jonah Wheeler, New Hampshire state representative from the 33rd district, Hillsborough (2022–present)

Local officials

- Maebe A. Girl, at-large Silver Lake neighborhood councilor (2019–present) and drag queen
- Andrew Hosmer, mayor of Laconia, New Hampshire (2020–present) and former New Hampshire State Senator from the 7th district (2012–2016)

Individuals

- Kii Arens, pop-artist, graphic designer, and director
- Krystal Ball, political commentator and media host; Democratic nominee for U.S. representative from VA-01 in 2010
- Jamie Lee Curtis, actress and producer
- ~~Peter Daou, political activist, musician, and author~~ (previously her campaign manager, then resigned and campaigned for Cornel West before resigning there; Independent)
- Keith David, actor
- Jimmy Demers, singer
- Steven Donziger, attorney
- Frances Fisher, actress
- Stanley Jordan, jazz guitarist
- Harvey J. Kaye, historian and sociologist (campaign advisor)
- Kyle Kulinski, political commentator and media host
- Leah McSweeney, fashion designer and TV personality
Uncommitted

U.S. representatives

- Andy Levin, former U.S. representative from MI-09 (2019–2023)
- ~~Beto O'Rourke, former U.S. representative from TX-16 (2013–2019)~~ (later endorsed Biden)
- David Skaggs, former U.S. representative from CO-02 (1987–1999) (unrelated to the Gaza War)
- Rashida Tlaib, U.S. representative from MI-12 (2023–present), MI-13 (2019–2023)

State legislators

- Gabriel Acevero, Maryland state delegate from HD-39 (2019–present)
- Abraham Aiyash, Michigan state representative from HD-04 (2020–present) and majority floor leader (2023–present)
- Jabari Brisport, New York state senator from SD-25 (2021–present)
- Erin Byrnes, Michigan state representative from HD-15 (2023–present)
- Ryan Clancy, Wisconsin state assemblymember from AD-19 (2023–present) and member of the Milwaukee County Board of Supervisors from BD-4 (2020–2024)
- Alabas Farhat, Michigan state representative from HD-03 (2023–present)
- Omar Fateh, Minnesota Senator from SD-62 (2021–present)
- Aisha Gomez, Minnesota state representative from HD-62A (2019–present)
- Hodan Hassan, Minnesota state representative from HD-62B (2019–present)
- Francesca Hong, Wisconsin state assemblymember from AD-76 (2021–present)
- Sadaf Jaffer, former New Jersey assemblymember from LD-16 (2022–2024) and former mayor of Montgomery Township (2019–2020)
- Chris Larson, Wisconsin senator from SD-07 (2011–present), former Senate minority leader (2013–2015)
- Darrin Madison, Wisconsin state assemblymember from AD-10 (2023–present)
- Zohran Mamdani, New York state assemblymember from AD-36 (2021–present)
- Marcela Mitaynes, New York state assemblymember from AD-51 (2021–present)
- Jen McEwen, Minnesota senator from SD-08 (2021–present)
- Ruwa Romman, Georgia state representative from HD-97 (2023–present)
- Samantha Sencer-Mura, Minnesota state representative from HD-63A (2023–present)
- Kristina Shelton, Wisconsin state assemblymember from AD-90 (2021–present)
- Andy Smith, Minnesota state representative from HD-25B (2023–present)
- Phara Souffrant Forrest, New York state assemblymember from AD-57 (2021–present)
- Yasmin Trudeau, Washington state senator from LD-27
- Nina Turner, former Ohio senator from SD-25 (2008–2014)
- Erika Uyterhoeven, Massachusetts state representative from SD-27th Middlesex
- Dylan Wegela, Michigan state representative from HD-26 (2023–present)
- Karen Whitsett, Michigan state representative from HD-04 (2018–present)
- Jay Xiong, Minnesota state representative from HD-67B (2019–present)

Local officials

- Tiffany Cabán, New York City councilmember from the CD-22 (2022–present)
- Aisha Chughtai, Minneapolis city councilmember from Ward 10 (2022–present)
- Abdullah Hammoud, mayor of Dearborn (2022–present) and former state representative from HD-15 (2017–2021)
- Shahana Hanif, New York City councilmember from CD-39 (2022–present)
- Mitra Jalali, Saint Paul city councilmember from Ward 4 (2018–present), city council president (2024–present)
- Teresa Mosqueda, King County councilmember from District 8 (2024–present) and former at-large Seattle city councilmember (2017–2024)
- Sandy Nurse, New York City councilmember from CD-37 (2022–present)
- Gabriela Santiago-Romero, Detroit city councilmember from District 6 (2022–present)
- Mary D. Waters, at-large Detroit city councilmember (2022–present), and former Michigan state representative from HD-04 (2001–2006)

Individuals

- Nasser Beydoun, former executive director of the Arab American Chamber of Commerce, Democratic candidate in the 2024 United States Senate election in Michigan
- Bikini Kill, band
- Macklemore, rapper
- Michael Moore, left wing activist and film producer
- Hassan Nasrallah, secretary-general of Hezbollah
- Ijeoma Oluo, writer
- Linda Sarsour, political activist and co-chair of the 2017 Women's March
- Shaun Scott, filmmaker and activist

Newspapers

- Detroit Metro Times
- The Stranger

Organizations

- American-Arab Anti-Discrimination Committee
- Armenian National Committee of America
- Council on American–Islamic Relations Action
- Democratic Socialists of America
- Emgage Action Pennsylvania
- IfNotNow
- Jewish Voice for Peace Action
- Massachusetts Peace Action
- Our Revolution
- Party for Socialism and Liberation
- Philadelphia Young Communist League USA
- Progressive Democrats of America
- Reclaim Philadelphia
- Rose City Indivisible
- Showing Up for Racial Justice
- Students for Justice in Palestine
- Sunrise Movement
- TakeAction Minnesota
- Women's International League for Peace and Freedom
- Working Families Party

Labor unions

- American Federation of Teachers Seattle Local 1789
- UAW Local 4121
- United Electrical, Radio and Machine Workers of America local 667
- Washington chapter of the United Food and Commercial Workers
Jason Palmer (withdrawn)

Former candidates

- Gabriel Cornejo, entrepreneur and former candidate in this race
- Frankie Lozada, entrepreneur and candidate for NY-05 in 2022, former candidate in this race
- Stephen Lyons, plumber and Republican candidate for president in 2020, former candidate in this race
"Ceasefire"

State officials

- Andru Volinsky, former member of the Executive Council of New Hampshire from the 2nd district (2017–2021)

== Opinion polling ==
Aggregate polls of declared candidates in the 2024 Democratic Party presidential primaries
Source of poll aggregation	Dates administered	Dates updated	Joe Biden	Dean Phillips	Marianne Williamson	Other/undecided (Note: Calculated by taking the difference of 100% and all other candidates combined.)	Margin
270 to Win	January 25 – February 14, 2024	February 18, 2024	74.2%	5.6%	8.0%	12.2%	Biden +66.2
FiveThirtyEight	through February 14, 2024	February 18, 2024	75.1%	6.9%	–	18.0%	Biden +68.2
Race to the WH	through January 29, 2024	February 2, 2024	71.9%	–	7.2%	20.9%	Biden +64.7
Real Clear Polling	December 26, 2023 – February 14, 2024	February 18, 2024	72.7%	4.7%	7.0%	15.6%	Biden +65.7
Average			73.5%	5.7%	7.4%	13.4%	Biden +66.1

== Campaign finance ==
This is an overview of the money used by each campaign as it is reported to the Federal Election Commission (FEC). Totals raised include individual contributions, loans from the candidate, and transfers from other campaign committees. Individual contributions are itemized (catalogued) by the FEC when the total value of contributions by an individual comes to more than $200. The last column, Cash On Hand, shows the remaining cash each campaign had available for its future spending as of December 31, 2023. Campaign finance reports for the first quarter of 2024 will become available on April 15, 2024.

This table does not include contributions made to Super PACs or party committees supporting the candidate. Each value is rounded up to the nearest dollar.

Candidate who withdrew prior to December 31
Candidate who withdrew following December 31

Overview of campaign financing for candidates in the 2024 Democratic Party presidential primariesthrough December 31, 2023
Candidate	Total raised	Total raised since last quarter	Individual contributions			Debt	Spent	Spent since last quarter	Cash on hand
Candidate	Total raised	Total raised since last quarter	Total	Unitemized	Pct	Debt	Spent	Spent since last quarter	Cash on hand
Biden	$105,875,492	$33,037,210	$25,975,051	$14,305,517	55.1%	$0	$92,354,198	$19,259,279	$45,958,298 (Note: Biden's principal campaign committee, Biden for President, was also used for his earlier 2020 presidential campaign. Some of these figures, therefore, include money left over from that previous candidacy.)
Williamson	$3,854,375	$1,339,016	$3,355,377	$1,616,210	48.2%	$593,030	$3,645,484	$1,231,291	$208,892
Palmer	$294,625		$29,625	$3,015	10.2%	$265,000	$163,401		$131,223
Phillips	$5,016,238		$1,016,218	$225,927	22.2%	$4,236,430	$4,656,238		$360,000
Kennedy	$22,115,682	$7,037,153	$22,080,359	$7,034,122	31.9%	$0	$16,676,899	$7,770,412	$5,438,782 (Note: These figures include data following Kennedy's withdrawal from the Democratic primary.)

== Pledged delegates by candidate following primaries ==
Pledged delegates by candidate following primaries
Candidate	Pledged delegates
Joe Biden (withdrawn)	3,905
Uncommitted	37
Dean Phillips (withdrawn)	4
Jason Palmer (withdrawn)	3
Total pledged delegate votes	3,949

== Results ==
Democratic primary results
Party	Candidate	Votes	%
Democratic	Joe Biden	14,465,519	87.09%
N/A	Uncommitted	706,591	4.25%
Democratic	Dean Phillips	529,486	3.19%
Democratic	Marianne Williamson	473,761	2.85%
Democratic	Jason Palmer	20,975	0.13%
N/A	Other candidates	413,592	2.49%
Total votes		16,609,924	100.00%

Map legend
Biden
Palmer
Phillips
Uncommitted
No votes reported
- Winner not yet declared

Initial pledged delegate allocation

Map legend
Biden
30 – 40%
40–50%
50–60%
60–70%
70–80%
80–90%
>90%
Phillips
40–50%
50–60%
Palmer
50–60%
Lozada
100%
Uncommitted
30–40%
40–50%
60–70%
No votes
No votes

First-place results by county

Write-in vote totals are excluded from the above election data reporting for the following states, and are added to the total number of votes for candidates for the purposes of candidate vote share calculations.

== See also ==
- 2024 Democratic National Convention
- 2024 Republican Party presidential primaries
- 2024 Republican National Convention
- 1968 Democratic Party presidential primaries
