= 2024 Montana Democratic presidential primary =

- June 4, 2024

25 delegates (20 pledged, 5 unpledged) to the Democratic National Convention

Candidate	Joe Biden	No preference
Home state	Delaware	–
Delegate count	20	0
Popular vote	94,587	9,285
Percentage	91.1%	8.9%
County results
Biden
70 – 80%
80 – 90%
>90%

The 2024 Montana Democratic presidential primary took place on June 4, 2024, together with four other primaries on the day, as part of the Democratic Party primaries for the 2024 presidential election. 20 delegates to the Democratic National Convention were allocated in the open primary, with 5 additional unpledged delegates.

Incumbent President Joe Biden ran basically unopposed in the state and won with more than 90% over the option for "no preference" delegates.

== Candidates ==
Only one candidate filed for the primary election ballot:

- Joe Biden

Additionally, voters had according to state law an option to vote for No preference, supported by "Montanans for Palestine" as a protest vote against US policy on the Israel-Hamas war in Gaza.

== Results ==
Montana Democratic primary, June 4, 2024
Candidate	Votes	%	Delegates
Joe Biden (incumbent)	94,587	91.06	20
No preference	9,285	8.94	0
Total	103,872	100%	20

== See also ==
- 2024 Montana Republican presidential primary
- 2024 Democratic Party presidential primaries
- 2024 United States presidential election
- 2024 United States presidential election in Montana
- 2024 United States elections
