= 2024 Nebraska Democratic presidential primary =

- May 14, 2024

34 delegates (29 pledged, 5 unpledged) to the Democratic National Convention

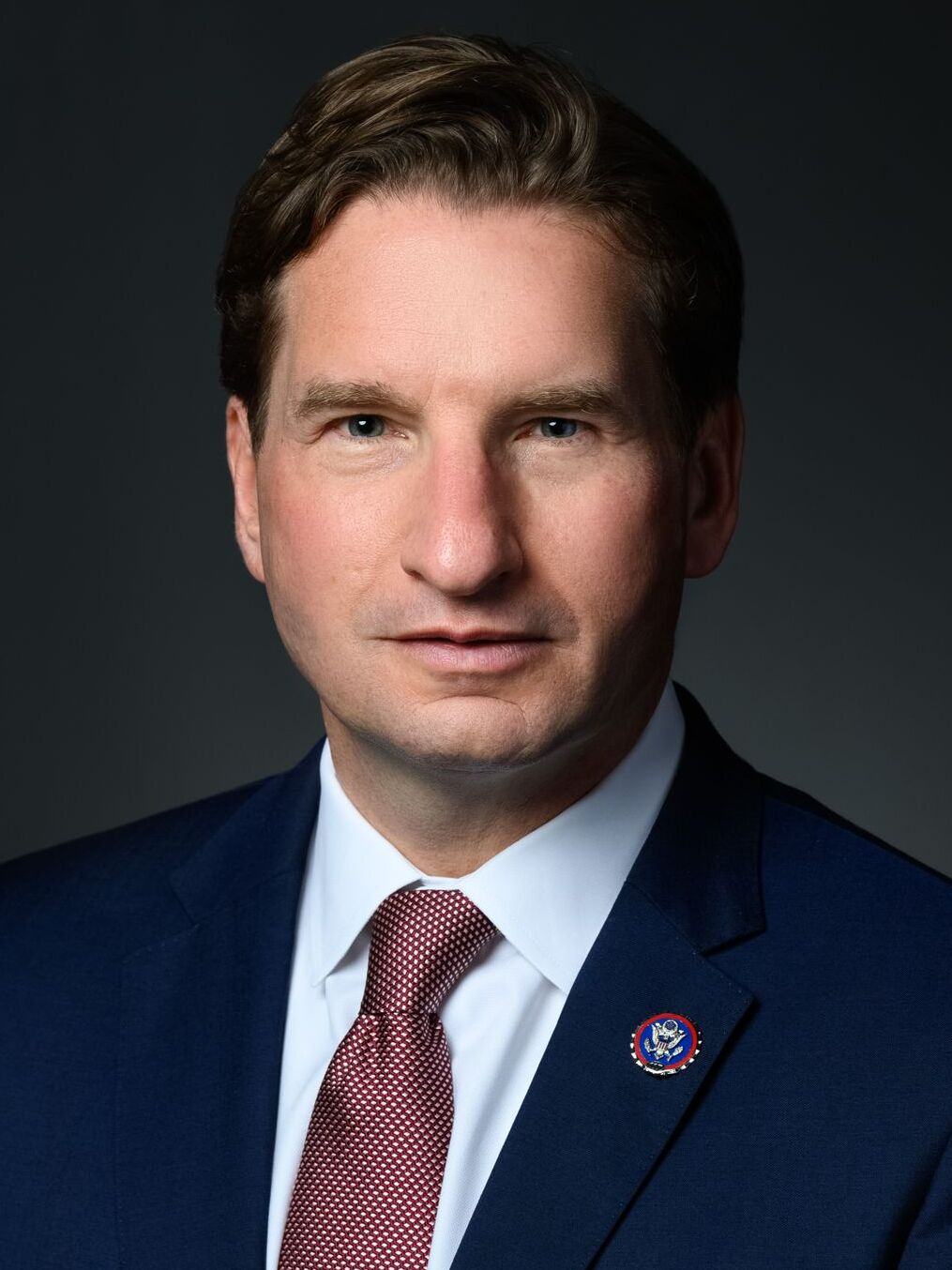
Candidate	Joe Biden	Dean Phillips (withdrawn)
Home state	Delaware	Minnesota
Delegate count	28	1
Popular vote	84,677	9,199
Percentage	90.2%	9.8%
Biden
50–60%
60–70%
70–80%
80–90%
>90%
Phillips
50–60%

The 2024 Nebraska Democratic presidential primary took place on May 14, 2024, as part of the Democratic Party primaries for the 2024 presidential election, alongside two other state contests. 29 delegates to the Democratic National Convention were allocated in the semi-closed primary, with 5 additional unpledged delegates.

Incumbent President Joe Biden announced his bid for a second term on April 25, 2023. He won 28 delegates and 90% of the vote made one of his best results during the campaign, but the only other ballot candidate Congressman Dean Phillips won one district delegate from Nebraska's 3rd congressional district by receiving the most votes in Logan County, where he attained 55.6%.

== Candidates ==
- Joe Biden
- Dean Phillips (withdrawn)

== Results ==
Nebraska Democratic primary, May 14, 2024
Candidate	Votes	%	Delegates
Joe Biden (incumbent)	84,677	90.20	28
Dean Phillips (withdrawn)	9,199	9.80	1
Total	93,876	100%	29

== See also ==
- 2024 Nebraska Republican presidential primary
- 2024 Democratic Party presidential primaries
- 2024 United States presidential election
- 2024 United States presidential election in Nebraska
- 2024 United States elections
