= 2024 Indiana Democratic presidential primary =

- May 7, 2024

88 delegates (79 pledged, 9 unpledged) to the Democratic National Convention
Candidate	Joe Biden
Home state	Delaware
Delegate count	79
Popular vote	178,253
Percentage	100%
- County results Biden: 100%

The 2024 Indiana Democratic presidential primary took place on May 7, 2024, as part of the Democratic Party primaries for the 2024 presidential election. 79 delegates to the Democratic National Convention were allocated in the open primary, with additional 9 unpledged delegates.

To make the primary ballot, candidates had to gather at least 500 signatures from each congressional district, for a total of 4,500 signatures. Incumbent President Joe Biden was the only candidate who met the requirements. An option for "uncommitted" did not appear on the ballot and write-in votes were not allowed, which made Indiana the second contest after the Alaska caucuses where Biden has been the only available option.

== Results ==
Indiana Democratic primary, May 7, 2024
Candidate	Votes	%	Delegates
Joe Biden	178,253	100.00	79
Total	178,253	100%	79

== See also ==
- 2024 Indiana Republican presidential primary
- 2024 Democratic Party presidential primaries
- 2024 United States presidential election
- 2024 United States presidential election in Indiana
- 2024 United States elections
