= 2024 Democratic Party presidential candidates =

Previous Democratic nominee
Joe Biden
Democratic nominee
Kamala Harris

The following is a list of candidates associated with the 2024 Democratic Party presidential primaries for the 2024 United States presidential election. By March 2024, more than 190 candidates had filed with the Federal Election Commission (FEC) to run for the Democratic nomination in 2024. As in previous cycles, the majority of these candidates did not appear on any ballots, raise money, or otherwise attempt to formally run a campaign.

On July 21, 2024, incumbent President Joe Biden, then-presumptive Democratic nominee after his victories in the primaries, suspended his re-election campaign. Biden immediately endorsed Vice President Kamala Harris, who quickly announced her own presidential campaign later that day and officially became the Democratic nominee on August 5. On August 6, 2024, Harris chose Tim Walz to be her running mate.

== Major candidates ==
On July 21, 2024, then-presumptive nominee Joe Biden announced the suspension of his re-election campaign and immediately endorsed Harris as his successor. Other than Biden, the only presidential candidates who were awarded pledged delegates to the 2024 Democratic National Convention based on the results of the primaries were incumbent Democratic U.S. Representative Dean Phillips and businessman Jason Palmer.

On August 2, 2024, Harris unofficially received the party nomination in a virtual roll call vote, which became official on August 5.

=== Nominee ===
Democratic nominee for the 2024 presidential election
| Candidate | Born | Most recent position | Home state | Campaign Announcement date | Total pledged delegates | Popular vote | Contests won | Running mate | Ref |
|---|---|---|---|---|---|---|---|---|---|
| Kamala Harris | October 20, 1964 (age 59); Oakland, California | Vice President of the United States (2021–2025) | California | Campaign July 21, 2024; FEC filing Website; Secured nomination: July 22, 2024 | 4567 / 4695 (97.3%) | None | 0 (Note: Harris entered the race after the primaries were completed. She initially expected to remain as Biden's running mate for re-election prior to the suspension of his re-election campaign.) | Tim Walz | |

=== Alternate ballot options ===
Alternate ballot options
| Name | Allocated delegates | Popular vote |
|---|---|---|
| Uncommitted | 37 (0.9%) | 706,591 (4.3%) |

=== Withdrew after the primaries ===
The candidates in this section have suspended their campaigns, or have otherwise ceased campaigning and ended their bids for the nomination after all primary contests were held.

Major candidates who withdrew after the 2024 Democratic Party presidential primaries
| Candidate | Born | Most recent position | Home state | Campaign announced | Campaign suspended | Campaign | Contests won | Total pledged delegates | Popular vote | Running mate | Ref |
|---|---|---|---|---|---|---|---|---|---|---|---|
| Joe Biden | November 20, 1942 (age 81); Scranton, Pennsylvania | President of the United States (2021–2025) | Delaware | April 25, 2023 | July 21, 2024 (endorsed Harris) | Campaign FEC filing Website; Secured nomination: March 12, 2024 (Note: Biden was the presumptive nominee prior to the suspension of his re-election campaign. He immediately endorsed his vice president, Kamala Harris, who became the official nominee afterwards.) | 56; AK, AL, AR, AZ, CA, CO, CT, DA, DC, DE (Note: The primary was cancelled, and Biden was awarded all pledged delegates.), FL, GA, GU, HI, ID, IL, IN, IA, KS, KY, LA, MA, ME, MD, MI, MN, MO, MP, MS, MT, NE, NV, NH (Note: Primary not sanctioned by the DNC. Delegates awarded through a separate firehouse primary.), NJ, NM, NY, NC, ND, OH, OK, OR, PA, PR, RI, SC, SD, TN, TX, UT, VA, VI, VT, WA, WV, WI, WY | 3905 / 3949 (98.9%) (Note: This was prior to the suspension of his re-election campaign.) | 14,465,519 (87.1%) | Kamala Harris | |
| Marianne Williamson | July 8, 1952 (age 72); Houston, Texas | Author | Washington, D.C. | March 4, 2023; February 28, 2024; July 2, 2024 | February 7, 2024; June 11, 2024; July 29, 2024 | Campaign FEC filing Website | None | 0 / 3949 (0%) | 465,863 (2.8%) | None | |

=== Withdrew during the primaries ===
The candidate in this section have suspended their campaigns, or have otherwise ceased campaigning and ended their bids for the nomination during the primary season.

Major candidates who withdrew during the 2024 Democratic Party presidential primaries
| Candidate | Born | Most recent position | Home state | Campaign announced | Campaign suspended | Campaign | Total pledged delegates | Contests won | Popular vote | Ref. |
|---|---|---|---|---|---|---|---|---|---|---|
| Jason Palmer | December 1, 1971 (age 52); Aberdeen, Maryland | Venture capitalist | Maryland | October 22, 2023 | May 15, 2024 (endorsed Biden, then Harris after Biden's withdrawal) | Campaign FEC filing Website | 3 / 3949 (0.1%) | 1 AS | 20,975 (0.1%) | |
| Dean Phillips | January 20, 1969 (age 55); Saint Paul, Minnesota | U.S. representative from MN-03 (2019–2025) | Minnesota | October 26, 2023 | March 6, 2024 (endorsed Biden, then Harris after Biden's withdrawal) | Campaign FEC filing Website | 4 / 3949 (0.1%) | None | 529,486 (3.2%) | |

=== Withdrew before the primaries ===
The candidates in this section have suspended their campaigns, or have otherwise ceased campaigning and ended their bids for the nomination before any primary contests were held.

Major candidates who withdrew before the 2024 Democratic Party presidential primaries
| Candidate | Born | Most recent position | Home state | Campaign announced | Campaign suspended | Campaign | Popular vote | Ref. |
|---|---|---|---|---|---|---|---|---|
| Robert F. Kennedy Jr. | January 17, 1954 (age 69); Washington, D.C. | Environmental lawyer | California | April 19, 2023 | October 9, 2023 (ran as an independent, later endorsed Trump) | Campaign FEC filing Website | None | |

== Other candidates ==
With over a thousand people registering with the Federal Election Commission every cycle, a very few actually make the effort to get on the ballot anywhere. The following have done so. In the past, several such efforts have qualified for delegates and two (Keith Judd and John Wolfe Jr.) received over 40% of the vote in the 2012 Democratic West Virginia and the 2012 Democratic Arkansas primaries, respectively.

=== On the ballot in ten or more states ===
- Armando Perez-Serrato, businessman and candidate for governor of California in 2022
- Frankie Lozada, entrepreneur and candidate for NY-05 in 2022 (endorsed Jason Palmer)

=== On the ballot in one or more states ===
- President R. Boddie, perennial candidate from Georgia
- Terrisa Bukovinac, anti-abortion activist and former president of Democrats for Life of America from Washington, D.C.
- Eban Cambridge, California
- Superpayaseria Crystalroc
- Bob Ely, investment banker and candidate for president in 2012 and 2020
- Brent Foutz, candidate for the Nevada Senate in 2022
- Tom Koos, former faculty of the Stanford Doerr School of Sustainability
- Paul V. LaCava
- Stephen Alan Leon, entrepreneur from Virginia
- Star Locke, Texas
- Raymond Michael Moroz, candidate for president in 2016 and 2020 from New York
- Derek Nadeau, New Hampshire
- David Michael Olscamp
- Mark Prascak
- Paperboy Prince, artist, community activist, and perennial candidate from New York
- Donald Picard
- Richard Rist
- Vermin Supreme, performance artist, activist, and perennial candidate from Massachusetts; former Libertarian Party Judicial Committee member (2020–2022)

=== Withdrawn ===
==== Withdrew prior to the primaries ====
- Jerome Segal, research scholar and Bread and Roses Party nominee for president in 2020 (withdrawn)

==== On the ballot in one or more states, withdrew during the primaries ====
- John Haywood, candidate for president in 2012 from North Carolina
- Cenk Uygur, co-creator of The Young Turks, co-founder of Justice Democrats, Democratic candidate for CA-25 in 2020 (Note: Uygur is not eligible to serve as president as he is not a natural-born citizen, but he claims he can run for the office.)
- Gabriel Cornejo, entrepreneur from Nevada (endorsed Jason Palmer)

==== On the ballot in 10 or more states, withdrew during the primaries ====
- Stephen Lyons, plumber (endorsed Jason Palmer)

== Declined to be candidates ==
The following notable individuals have been the subject of speculation about their possible candidacy, but have publicly denied interest in running.

- Stacey Abrams, founder of Fair Fight Action, Minority Leader of the Georgia House of Representatives (2011–2017) from the 89th district (2007–2017), nominee for Governor of Georgia in 2018 and 2022
- Eric Adams, 110th Mayor of New York City (2022–2025) (endorsed Biden)
- Tammy Baldwin, United States Senator from Wisconsin (2013–present), United States Representative from WI-02 (1999–2013) (running for re-election)
- Andy Beshear, 63rd Governor of Kentucky (2019–present), 50th Attorney General of Kentucky (2016–2019) (successfully ran for re-election)
- Cory Booker, United States Senator from New Jersey (2013–present), 38th Mayor of Newark, New Jersey (2006–2013), member of the Municipal Council of Newark (1998–2002), candidate for president in 2020 (endorsed Biden)
- Sherrod Brown, United States Senator from Ohio (2007–2025), United States Representative from OH-13 (1993–2007), 47th Secretary of State of Ohio (1983–1991) (running for re-election) (endorsed Biden)
- Pete Buttigieg, 19th United States Secretary of Transportation (2021–present), 32nd Mayor of South Bend, Indiana (2012–2020), candidate for president in 2020 (endorsed Biden)
- Hillary Clinton, 67th United States Secretary of State (2009–2013), United States Senator from New York (2001–2009), First Lady of the United States (1993–2001), First Lady of Arkansas (1979–1981, 1983–1992), Democratic presidential nominee in 2016, candidate for president in 2008 (endorsed Biden)
- Roy Cooper, 75th Governor of North Carolina (2017–2025), 49th Attorney General of North Carolina (2001–2017), Majority Leader of the North Carolina Senate (1997–2001) from the 10th district (1991–2001), member of the North Carolina House of Representatives from the 72nd district (1987–1991) (endorsed Biden)
- Jamie Dimon, chairman and CEO of JPMorgan Chase
- Al Gore, 45th Vice President of the United States (1993–2001), United States Senator from Tennessee (1985–1993), United States Representative from TN-06 (1977–1985), Democratic presidential nominee in 2000, candidate for president in 1988
- Jay Inslee, 23rd Governor of Washington (2013–present), United States Representative from WA-01 (1993–1995, 1999–2012), candidate for president in 2020
- Ro Khanna, United States Representative from CA-17 (2017–present) (endorsed Biden)
- Amy Klobuchar, United States Senator from Minnesota (2007–present), County Attorney of Hennepin County (1999–2007), candidate for president in 2020 (endorsed Biden, running for re-election)
- Wes Moore, 63rd Governor of Maryland (2023–present) (endorsed Biden)
- Chris Murphy, United States Senator from Connecticut (2013–present), United States Representative from CT-05 (2007–2013), member of the Connecticut State Senate from the 16th district (2003–2007), member of the Connecticut House of Representatives from the 81st district (1999–2003) (running for re-election)
- Phil Murphy, 56th Governor of New Jersey (2018–present), United States Ambassador to Germany (2009–2013), Finance Chair of the Democratic National Committee (2006–2009) (endorsed Biden)
- Gavin Newsom, 40th Governor of California (2019–present), 49th Lieutenant Governor of California (2011–2019), 41st Mayor of San Francisco (2004–2011) (endorsed Biden)
- Michelle Obama, First Lady of the United States (2009–2017)
- Jared Polis, 43rd Governor of Colorado (2019–present), United States Representative from CO-02 (2009–2019), member of the Colorado State Board of Education (2001–2007)
- J. B. Pritzker, 43rd Governor of Illinois (2019–present) (endorsed Biden)
- Bernie Sanders, United States Senator from Vermont (2007–present), United States Representative from VT-AL (1991–2007), 37th Mayor of Burlington (1981–1989), candidate for president in 2016 and 2020 (endorsed Biden)
- Adam Schiff, United States Representative from CA-30 (2001–2025) (running for U.S. Senate)
- Jon Stewart, host of The Problem with Jon Stewart (2021–2023), host of The Daily Show (1999–2015)
- Elizabeth Warren, United States Senator from Massachusetts (2013–present), candidate for president in 2020 (endorsed Biden)
- Gretchen Whitmer, 49th Governor of Michigan (2019–present), Ingham County Prosecuting Attorney (2016), Minority Leader of the Michigan Senate (2011–2015) from the 23rd district (2006–2015), member of the Michigan House of Representatives from the 69th district (2001–2006) (endorsed Biden)

== Timeline ==
| Active campaign | Exploratory committee | Democratic National Convention |
| Withdrawn candidate | Primaries | Democratic National Convention |

== See also ==
- 2024 Republican Party presidential candidates
- Third-party and independent candidates for the 2024 United States presidential election
- Timeline of the 2024 United States presidential election
