= Ballot access in the 2024 United States presidential election =

In the 2024 United States presidential election, different laws and procedures govern whether or not a candidate or political party is entitled to appear on voters' ballots. Under Article 2, Section 1 of the United States Constitution, laws about election procedure are established and enforced by the states. Additionally, there are often different requirements for primary and general elections, and requirements for primary elections may additionally differ by party.

Additionally, the filing requirements to appear on the ballot often differ between parties and independents, leading some independents such as Robert F. Kennedy, Jr. to create a party to get on the ballot in states where the requirement is lower for party-sponsored candidates. Conversely, parties like the Libertarians and Greens will have their nominee petition as an independent in states where such a route is less restrictive.

== Deadlines ==
All dates are in the year 2024 unless otherwise stated.

Deadlines for ballot access in the 2024 United States presidential election (as of September 18, 2024)
State	Minor party	Independent	Write-in
AL	Mar 5	Aug 15	Automatic
AK	Aug 7	Aug 7	No write-ins
AZ	Nov 30, 2023	Aug 17	Sep 26
AR	Aug 5	Aug 1	No write-ins
CA	Jul 5	Aug 9	Oct 22
CO	Jul 1	Jul 11	Jul 18
CT	N/A (Note: Ballot access for parties determined by election results)	Aug 7	Oct 7
DE	N/A (Note: Ballot access for parties determined by party registration)	Sep 3	Oct 28
DC	TBD	Aug 7	Nov 12
FL	N/A (Note: Ballot access for parties not determined by petitioning)	Jul 15	Jul 15
GA	Jul 9	Jul 9	Sep 3
HI	Feb 22	Aug 7	No write-ins
ID	Aug 30	Aug 1	Sep 6
IL	N/A (Note: Ballot access for parties determined by election results)	Jun 24	Sep 5
IN	N/A (Note: Ballot access for parties determined by election results)	Jul 15	Jul 3
IA	N/A (Note: Ballot access for parties determined by caucus attendance)	Aug 16	Automatic
KS	Jun 1	Aug 5	Oct 14
KY	N/A (Note: Ballot access for parties determined by election results)	Sep 6	Oct 25
LA	N/A (Note: Ballot access for parties can be determined by election results or party registration)	Aug 23	No write-ins
ME	N/A (Note: Ballot access for parties can be determined by election results or party registration)	Aug 1	Aug 27
MD	Aug 5	Aug 5	Oct 17
MA	N/A (Note: Ballot access for parties determined by election results)	Aug 27	Sep 6
MI	Jul 18	Jul 18	Oct 25
MN	Jun 4	Aug 20	Oct 29
MS	N/A (Note: Petition not required for ballot access)	Sep 6	No write-ins
MO	Jul 29	Jul 29	Oct 25
MT	Feb 22	Aug 14	Sep 11
NE	N/A (Note: Ballot access for parties determined by election results)	Aug 1	Oct 25
NV	May 17	Jul 5	No write-ins
NH	Aug 7	Jun 14	Automatic
NJ	N/A (Note: Ballot access for parties determined by election results)	Jul 29	Automatic
NM	TBD (Note: Petition deadline TBD. Deadline to submit slates of electors is Sep 10)	Jun 27	No write-ins
NY	N/A (Note: Ballot access for parties determined by election results)	May 28	Oct 15
NC	Jun 1	Mar 5	Aug 7 (Note: Must obtain 500 signatures)
ND	N/A (Note: Ballot access for parties determined by election results)	Sep 3	Oct 15
OH	Jul 3	Sep 1	Aug 25
OK	Feb 29	Jul 15	No write-ins
OR	TBD (Note: Petition deadline TBD. Deadline to submit slates of electors is Aug 27)	Aug 27	Automatic
PA	N/A (Note: Ballot access for parties determined by election results)	Aug 1	Automatic
RI	Aug 1	Sep 6	Automatic
SC	May 5	Jul 15	No write-ins
SD	Mar 26	Aug 6	No write-ins
TN	Aug 7	Aug 15	Sep 16
TX	May 28 (Note: Ballot access for parties determined by convention attendance)	May 13	Aug 19
UT	Nov 30, 2023	Jun 15 (Note: Filing deadline was previously Jan 8, but legislation was passed to extend the deadline.)	Sep 1
VT	N/A (Note: Ballot access for parties determined by town committee organization attendance)	Aug 1	Automatic
VA	N/A (Note: Ballot access for parties determined by election results)	Aug 23	Oct 28
WA	N/A (Note: Ballot access for parties determined by election results)	Aug 2	Poll closure
WV	N/A (Note: Ballot access for parties determined by election results)	Aug 1	Sep 17
WI	Apr 1	Aug 6	Oct 22
WY	Jun 1	Aug 26	Automatic

== General election ==
The following is a table of which parties and independent candidates received presidential ballot access in which states.

Yes indicates that the party or candidate was on the ballot in 2024.

indicates that the state has automatic write-in access.

indicates that the candidate was a recognized write-in candidate.

No indicates that the party or candidate did not qualify for the ballot.

No indicates that the party or candidate did qualify for the ballot, but withdrew.

No indicates that the party or candidate was listed on the ballot, but votes for them were considered spoiled due to lawsuits.

Parties which did not field candidates for president and parties without presidential ballot access are not included in this table.

Ballot access in the 2024 United States presidential election
State / electors		Nominated parties and independents							
State / electors		Constitution (Note: The Constitution Party is listed as the U.S. Taxpayer's Party in Michigan) Terry/Broden	Democratic (Note: The Democratic Party is listed as the Democratic-Farmer-Labor Party in Minnesota and as the Democratic-Nonpartisan League in North Dakota) Harris/Walz	Green (Note: The Green Party is listed as the Maine Green Independent Party in Maine, as the Mountain Party in West Virginia, as the Pacific Green Party in Oregon, and as the Green-Rainbow Party in Massachusetts) Stein/Ware	Independent Kennedy/ Shanahan (Note: Suspended candidacy and endorsed Trump; removed his name from swing state ballots & several others and remained on ballots elsewhere.)	Independent West/ Abdullah	Libertarian Oliver/ ter Maat	PSL De la Cruz/ Garcia	Republican Trump/Vance
AL	9	Registration not required	Yes	as Independent	Yes	Registration not required	as Independent	Registration not required	Yes
AK	3	Yes	Yes	as Independent	Yes	As nominee of Aurora Party	Yes	No	Yes
AZ	11	No	Yes	Yes	No	No	Yes	Write-in	Yes
AR	6	No	Yes	Yes	Yes	No	Yes	No	Yes
CA	54	No	Yes	Yes	As Nominee of American Independent Party	No	Yes	as Peace and Freedom Party	Yes
CO	10	Yes	Yes	Yes	Yes	as Unity Party	Yes	Write-in	Yes
CT	7	No	Yes	Yes	Yes	Write-in	Yes	Write-in	Yes
DE	3	No	Yes	Write-in	As Independent Party of Delaware	Write-in	Yes	Write-in	Yes
DC	3	No	Yes	No	Yes	No	Write-in	Write-in	Yes
FL	30	Yes	Yes	Yes	No	No	Yes	Yes	Yes
GA	16	No	Yes	Yes	No	No	Yes	as Independent	Yes
HI	4	No	Yes	Yes	No	No	Yes	Yes	Yes
ID	4	(Note: State Constitution Party nominated Joel Skousen)	Yes	as Independent	Yes	No	Yes	As Independent	Yes
IL	19	No	Yes	Write-in	Yes	Write-in	Write-in	Write-in	Yes
IN	11	No	Yes	No	as We The People Party	Write-in	Yes	Write-in	Yes
IA	6	Registration not required	Yes	Registration not required	as We The People Party	Registration not required	Yes	Yes	Yes
KS	6	No	Yes	Write-in	Yes	Write-in	Yes	Write-in	Yes
KY	8	No	Yes	Yes	Yes	Write-in	Yes	Write-in	Yes
LA	8	Yes	Yes	Yes	as We The People Party	as Justice For All Party	Yes	Yes	Yes
ME	4	No	Yes	Yes	No	as Justice For All Party	Yes	Write-in	Yes
MD	10	No	Yes	Yes	Yes	Write-in	Yes	Write-in	Yes
MA	11	No	Yes	Yes	No	Write-in	as Libertarian Association of Massachusetts	Yes	Yes
MI	15	Yes	Yes	Yes	as Natural Law Party	Yes	Yes	No	Yes
MN	10	No	Yes	Yes	Yes	as Justice For All Party	Yes	Yes	Yes
MS	6	Yes	Yes	Yes	Yes	No	Yes	as Independent	Yes
MO	10	No	Yes	Yes	No	No	Yes	Write-in	Yes
MT	4	No	Yes	Yes	Yes	No	Yes	No	Yes
NE	5	No	Yes	Yes	No	as Nebraska Legal Marijuana NOW Party	Yes	No	Yes
NV	6	(Note: State Constitution Party nominated Joel Skousen)	Yes	No	No	No	Yes	No	Yes
NH	4	Registration not required	Yes	Yes	No	Registration not required	Yes	Registration not required	Yes
NJ	14	Yes	Yes	as Independent	Yes	Registration not required	Yes	Yes	Yes
NM	5	No	Yes	Yes	Yes	No	as nominee of unaffiliated Libertarian Party of New Mexico	Yes	Yes
NY	28	No	Yes	Write-in	No	Write-in	Write-in	Write-in	Yes
NC	16	Yes	Yes	Yes	No	as Justice For All Party	Yes	Write-in	Yes
ND	3	No	Yes	No	No	No	as Independent	Write-in	Yes
OH	17	No	Yes	as Independent	No	Write-in	Yes	Write-in	Yes
OK	7	No	Yes	No	Yes	No	Yes	No	Yes
OR	8	as nominee of unaffiliated Oregon Constitution Party	Yes	Yes	as We The People Party	As nominee of Oregon Progressive Party	Yes	Registration not required	Yes
PA	19	Registration not required	Yes	Yes	No	Registration not required	Yes	Registration not required	Yes
RI	4	Registration not required	Yes	as Independent	Yes	Registration not required	as Independent	as Independent	Yes
SC	9	Yes	Yes	Yes	No	As nominee of United Citizens Party	Yes	As nominee of SC Workers Party	Yes
SD	3	No	Yes	No	Yes	No	Yes	No	Yes
TN	11	No	Yes	as Independent	Yes	Write-in	Write-in	as Independent	Yes
TX	40	No	Yes	Yes	No	Write-in	Yes	Write-in	Yes
UT	6	(Note: State Constitution Party nominated Joel Skousen)	Yes	Yes	No	Yes	Yes	as Independent	Yes
VT	3	Registration not required	Yes	Registration not required	as We The People Party	As Green Mountain Peace and Justice Party	Yes	Yes	Yes
VA	13	No	Yes	Yes	No	Yes	Yes	as Independent	Yes
WA	12	No	Yes	Yes	as We The People Party	as Justice For All Party	Yes	Yes	Yes
WV	4	No	Yes	Yes	Yes	Write-in	Yes	Write-in	Yes
WI	10	Yes	Yes	Yes	Yes	Yes	Yes	as Independent	Yes
WY	3	(Note: The Wyoming Constitution Party refused to nominate Terry)	Yes	Registration not required	No	Registration not required	Yes	Registration not required	Yes
		Constitution Terry/Broden	Democratic Harris/Walz	Green Stein/Ware	Independent Kennedy/Shanahan	Independent West/Abdullah	Libertarian Oliver/ter Maat	PSL De la Cruz/Garcia	Republican Trump/Vance
Certified states & DC (write-in)		12 (7)	51	37 (7)	31 (3)	15 (20)	47 (4)	19 (24)	51
Certified electors (write-in)		133 (48)	538	420 (68)	283 (26)	132 (234)	477 (61)	220 (268)	538
Ref.									

=== Ballot access in ten states or fewer ===
Party	Presidential candidate	Vice presidential candidate	States on Ballot (Electors)	
Party	Presidential candidate	Vice presidential candidate	Printed	Write-in
American Solidarity Party	Peter Sonski	Lauren Onak	7 (74) (Note: Alaska (3); Arkansas (6); California (54); Florida (30); Hawaii (4); Louisiana (8); Mississippi (6, as Independent); Ohio (17, as Independent))	35 (400) (Note: Alabama (9); Colorado (10); Connecticut (7); Delaware (3); Georgia (16); Idaho (4); Illinois (19); Iowa (6); Kansas (6); Kentucky (8); Maine (4); Maryland (10); Massachusetts (11); Michigan (15); Minnesota (10); Missouri (10); Nebraska (5); New Hampshire (4); New Jersey (14); New York (28); North Dakota (3); Oregon (8); Pennsylvania (19); Rhode Island (4); Tennessee (11); Texas (40); Utah (6); Vermont (3); Virginia (13); Washington (12); West Virginia (4); Wisconsin (10); Wyoming (3))
Socialist Workers Party	Rachele Fruit	Dennis Richter	6 (58) (Note: Louisiana (8); Minnesota (10); New Jersey (14); Tennessee (11); Vermont (3, as Independent); Washington (12))	7 (53) (Note: Alabama (9); Iowa (6); New Hampshire (4); Oregon (8); Pennsylvania (19); Rhode Island (4); Wyoming (3))
Independent	Shiva Ayyadurai	Crystal Ellis	7 (57) (Note: Idaho (4); Iowa (6); Kentucky (8); Massachusetts (11); Minnesota (10); Mississippi (6); Washington (12))	28 (318) (Note: Alabama (9); Arizona (11); Colorado (10); Connecticut (7); Delaware (3); District of Columbia (3); Florida (30); Georgia (16); Illinois (19); Kansas (6); Maine (4); Maryland (10); Missouri (10); Montana (4); New Hampshire (4); New Jersey (14); New York (28); North Carolina (16); North Dakota (3); Ohio (17); Oregon (8); Pennsylvania (19); Rhode Island (4); Texas (40); Vermont (3); Virginia (13); West Virginia (4); Wyoming (3))
Socialist Equality Party	Joseph Kishore	Jerry White	3 (41) (Note: Michigan (15); New Jersey (14); Washington (12))	13 (117) (Note: Alabama (9); Illinois (19); Iowa (6); Kentucky (8); Maryland (10); Minnesota (10); New Hampshire (4); Oregon (8); Pennsylvania (19); Rhode Island (4); Vermont (3); Virginia (13); Wyoming (3))
Independent	Richard Duncan	Mitch Bupp	1 (17) (Note: Ohio (17))	9 (70) (Note: Alabama (9); Iowa (6); New Hampshire (4); New Jersey (14); Oregon (8); Pennsylvania (19); Rhode Island (4); Vermont (3); Wyoming (3))
Constitution Party dissidents (Note: The Nevada Constitution Party affiliated is listed as the Independent American Party of Nevada)	Joel Skousen	Rik Combs	3 (16) (Note: Idaho (4); Nevada (6); Utah (6))	11 (93) (Note: Alabama (9); Arizona (11); Iowa (6); New Hampshire (4); New Jersey (14); Oregon (8); Pennsylvania (19); Rhode Island (4); Vermont (3); Washington (12); Wyoming (3))
Independent	Jay Bowman	De Bowman	1 (11) (Note: Tennessee (11))	15 (144) (Note: Alabama (9); Georgia (16); Iowa (6); Kentucky (8); Michigan (15); New Hampshire (4); New Jersey (14); Ohio (17); Oregon (8); Pennsylvania (19); Rhode Island (4); Utah (6); Vermont (3); Washington (12); Wyoming (3))
Approval Voting Party	Blake Huber	Andrea Denault	1 (10) (Note: Colorado (10))	9 (70) (Note: Alabama (9); Iowa (6); New Hampshire (4); New Jersey (14); Oregon (8); Pennsylvania (19); Rhode Island (4); Vermont (3); Wyoming (3))
Godliness, Truth, Justice Party	Mattie Preston	Shannel Conner	1 (8) (Note: Louisiana (8))	9 (70) (Note: Alabama (9); Iowa (6); New Hampshire (4); New Jersey (14); Oregon (8); Pennsylvania (19); Rhode Island (4); Vermont (3); Wyoming (3))
Independent	Chris Garrity	Cody Ballard	1 (7) (Note: Oklahoma (7))	15 (145) (Note: Alabama (9); Colorado (10); Iowa (6); Kansas (6); Minnesota (10); New Hampshire (4); New Jersey (14); New York (28); Ohio (17); Oregon (8); Pennsylvania (19); Rhode Island (4); Vermont (3); West Virginia (4); Wyoming (3))
Socialist Party USA	Bill Stodden	Stephanie Cholensky	1 (6) (Note: Iowa (6))	10 (77) (Note: Alabama (9); Delaware (3); Maryland (10); New Hampshire (4); New Jersey (14); Oregon (8); Pennsylvania (19); Rhode Island (4); Vermont (3); Wyoming (3))
Prohibition Party	Michael Wood	John Pietrowski	1 (6) (Note: Arkansas (6))	9 (70) (Note: Alabama (9); Iowa (6); New Hampshire (4); New Jersey (14); Oregon (8); Pennsylvania (19); Rhode Island (4); Vermont (3); Wyoming (3))
Independent	Lucifer "Justin Case" Everylove	None	1 (6) (Note: Utah (6))	9 (70) (Note: Alabama (9); Iowa (6); New Hampshire (4); New Jersey (14); Oregon (8); Pennsylvania (19); Rhode Island (4); Vermont (3); Wyoming (3))
Liberal Party USA	Laura Ebke	Trisha Butler	1 (5) (Note: New Mexico)	9 (70) (Note: Alabama (9); Iowa (6); New Hampshire (4); New Jersey (14); Oregon (8); Pennsylvania (19); Rhode Island (4); Vermont (3); Wyoming (3))
Party Party	Robby Wells	Tony Jones	1 (4) (Note: Rhode Island (4, as Independent))	9 (78) (Note: Alabama (9); Iowa (6); New Hampshire (4); New Jersey (14); Oregon (8); Pennsylvania (19); Vermont (3); Washington (12); Wyoming (3))
Pirate Party	Vermin Supreme	Jonathan Realz	1 (3) (Note: Delaware (3, as Conservative Party of Delaware))	9 (70) (Note: Alabama (9); Iowa (6); New Hampshire (4); New Jersey (14); Oregon (8); Pennsylvania (19); Rhode Island (4); Vermont (3); Wyoming (3))
Ref.				

=== Non-binding advisory straw polls ===
==== Guam ====
As a territory, Guam does not receive electoral votes in the presidential election. However, beginning in 1980, the island has held a non-binding advisory primary. Seven candidates qualified for the ballot.

- Kamala Harris and Tim Walz (Democratic)
- Donald Trump and JD Vance (Republican)
- Jill Stein and Butch Ware (Green)
- Robert F. Kennedy Jr. and Nicole Shanahan (Independent)
- Peter Sonski and Lauren Onak (American Solidarity)
- Michael Wood and John Pietrowski (Prohibition)
- Bill Stodden and Stephanie Cholensky (Socialist Party USA)

==== Puerto Rico ====
As a territory, Puerto Rico does not receive electoral votes in the presidential election. For the first time, the island held a non-binding advisory primary. Two candidates qualified for the ballot.

- Kamala Harris and Tim Walz (Democratic)
- Donald Trump and JD Vance (Republican)

== Controversies ==
=== Georgia ===
The Chief State Administrative Law Judge kicked Kennedy, Stein, West and Cruz off the ballot in his rulings on Democratic lawsuits. Three days later, Secretary of State Brad Raffensperger restored Stein, West and Cruz to the ballot and ruled Kennedy's ballot access was moot, as he had withdrawn. Democrats were considering an appeal. Kennedy, West and Cruz were challenged for collecting signatures in the name of the presidential candidate, rather than each of the 16 elector candidates. Stein was challenged over whether the Green Party had ballot access in 20 other states. Kennedy was also challenged over his address.

=== New York ===
In 2020 the state of New York tightened its ballot access prerequisites, among other things raising the threshold for parties to automatically qualify onto the ballot and for candidates to independently petition onto it. In a separate issue, Kennedy's petition was denied by a state judge for using a false address. As a result, the state is the only one where all third-party or independent candidates failed to qualify to be on the ballot.

=== Democratic primary ===
==== Florida controversy ====
On November 30, 2023, the Florida Democratic Party only submitted Joe Biden's name to the secretary of state. Candidates can be placed on the ballot either by petition, or having the party submit their name to the secretary of state. As his name was the only one on the ballot, the Democratic primary was cancelled under Florida law. Democratic presidential candidate Dean Phillips heavily criticized the decision, stating "Americans would expect the absence of democracy in Tehran, not Tallahassee." A lawsuit attempting to place Phillips as well as Marianne Williamson and Cenk Uygur candidates was lost in district court.

==== Tennessee controversy ====
Tennessee secretary of state Tre Hargett only certified Joe Biden's name for the Democratic primary ballot. Dean Phillips's petition to be placed on the ballot was rejected, as he did not collect enough valid signatures. As voters are still able to vote for Uncommitted as well as write-in candidates, the primary still took place. Joe Biden won the Tennessee primary against Uncommitted by 84 percentage points.

=== Republican primary ===
==== Chris Christie Maine qualification controversy ====
Former Governor of New Jersey Chris Christie failed to make the Maine primary ballot, as he did not submit the required 2,000 signatures to the Secretary of State by the November 20 deadline. Christie attempted to appeal the decision, but the Maine Superior Court upheld the secretary's ruling.

== Democratic primary ==
The following is a table of which candidates received ballot access in which states in the Democratic Party primaries.

Yes indicates that the candidate was on the ballot for the primary contest.
indicates that the candidate was a recognized write-in candidate.
No indicates that the candidate did not appear on the ballot in that state's contest.
indicates that a candidate withdrew before the election but was still listed on the ballot.

Ballot access in the 2024 Democratic presidential nominating contests
Contest	Date	Biden	Palmer	Williamson	Phillips	Others	Uncommitted (Note: Includes "None of These Candidates" in Nevada; "noncommitted delegate" in Colorado; "no preference" in Massachusetts, Montana, and North Carolina; "undeclared" in Wyoming; "none of the names shown" in Kansas; "uninstructed delegation" in Wisconsin.)
New Hampshire (state-run) (Note: This primary did not award any delegates.)	Jan 23	Write-in	Yes	Yes	Yes	Yes (Note: "President": R. Boddie, Terrisa Bukovinac, Eban Cambridge, Gabriel Cornejo, Mark Stewart Greenstein, Tom Koos, Paul V. LaCava, Star Locke, Frankie Lozada, Stephen P. Lyons, Raymond Michael Moroz, Derek Nadeau, Mando Perez-Serrato, Donald Picard, Paperboy Love Prince, Richard Rist, Vermin Supreme, John Vail Received votes as a write-in not counted as "scatter": Nikki Haley (running as a Republican), Donald Trump (running as a Republican), Vivek Ramaswamy (ran as a Republican), Ron DeSantis (ran as a Republican), Chris Christie (ran as a Republican), Robert F. Kennedy Jr. (running as an Independent), CeaseFire (not a candidate), Bernie Sanders (not a candidate))	No
South Carolina	Feb 3	Yes	No	Yes	Yes	No	No
Nevada	Feb 6	Yes	Yes	Yes	No	Yes (Note: Gabriel Cornejo, Superpayaseria Crystalroc, Brent Foutz, John Haywood, Stephen Alan Leon, Frankie Lozada, Stephen Lyons, Armando Perez-Serrato, Donald Picard, Mark R. Prascak)	Yes
Michigan	Feb 27	Yes	No	Yes-withdrawn	Yes	No	Yes
Alabama	Mar 5	Yes	No	No	Yes	No	Yes
American Samoa	Mar 5	Yes	Yes	No	Yes	No	No
Arkansas	Mar 5	Yes	No	Yes	Yes	Yes (Note: Frank Lozada, Stephen Lyons, Armando Perez-Serrato)	No
California	Mar 5	Yes	No	Yes	Yes	Yes (Note: "President": R. Boddie, Eban Cambridge, Gabriel Cornejo, Stephen P. Lyons, Armando "Mando" Perez-Serrato Recognized write-in candidates: Willie Felix Carter, President Cristina Nicole Grappo, Richard Gutierrez, James Mark Merts, Reed Michaelsen, Wayne Anthony Pope Sr.)	No
Colorado	Mar 5	Yes	Yes	Yes	Yes	Yes (Note: Gabriel Cornejo, Frankie Lozada, Stephen P. Lyons, Armando "Mando" Perez-Serrato)	Yes
Iowa (Note: Iowa is holding an all mail-in caucus due to DNC rules. Mail-in voting occurs from January 12 to March 5.)	Mar 5	Yes	No	Yes	Yes	No	Yes
Maine	Mar 5	Yes	No	No	Yes	No	No
Massachusetts	Mar 5	Yes	No	Yes	Yes	No	Yes
Minnesota	Mar 5	Yes	Yes	Yes	Yes	Yes (Note: Eban Cambridge, Gabriel Cornejo, Frankie Lozada, Armando "Mando" Perez-Serrato, Cenk Uygur (Note: Uygur is not eligible to be president under the natural-born citizen clause of the United States Constitution.))	Yes
North Carolina	Mar 5	Yes	No	No	No	No	Yes
Oklahoma	Mar 5	Yes	No	Yes	Yes	Yes (Note: Stephen Lyons, Armando "Mando" Perez-Serrato, Cenk Uygur)	No
Tennessee	Mar 5	Yes	No	No	No	No	Yes
Texas	Mar 5	Yes	No	Yes	Yes	Yes (Note: Gabriel A. Cornejo, Robert Star Locke, Frankie Lozada, Armando "Mando" Perez-Serrato, Cenk Uygur)	No
Utah	Mar 5	Yes	No	Yes	Yes	Yes (Note: Gabriel Cornejo, Frank Lozada)	No
Vermont	Mar 5	Yes	Yes	Yes	Yes	Yes (Note: Mark Stewart Greenstein, Cenk Uygur)	No
Virginia	Mar 5	Yes	No	Yes	Yes	No	No
Hawaii	Mar 6	Yes	Yes	Yes	Yes	Yes (Note: Armando "Mando" Perez-Serrato)	Yes
Democrats Abroad (Note: Voting runs from March 5 to March 12.)	Mar 12	Yes	No	Yes	No	No	Yes
Georgia	Mar 12	Yes	No	Yes	Yes-withdrawn	No	No
Mississippi	Mar 12	Yes	No	No	No	No	No
Northern Mariana Islands	Mar 12	Yes	Yes	Yes	Yes-withdrawn	No	No
Washington	Mar 12	Yes	No	Yes	Yes-withdrawn	No	Yes
Arizona	Mar 19	Yes	Yes	Yes	Yes-withdrawn	(Note: Gabriel Cornejo, Frankie Lozada, Stephen Lyons)	No
Illinois	Mar 19	Yes	No	Yes	Yes-withdrawn	(Note: Frankie Lozada)	No
Kansas	Mar 19	Yes	Yes	Yes	Yes-withdrawn	No	Yes
Ohio	Mar 19	Yes	No	No	Yes-withdrawn	No	No
Louisiana	Mar 23	Yes	No	Yes	Yes-withdrawn	Yes (Note: "Bob" Ely, Frankie Lozada, Stephen Lyons, Armando "Mando" Perez-Serrato, Cenk Uygur)	No
Missouri	Mar 23	Yes	Yes	Yes	Yes-withdrawn	Yes (Note: Stephen Lyons, Armando "Mando" Perez-Serrato)	Yes
North Dakota	Mar 30	Yes	Yes	Yes	Yes-withdrawn	Yes (Note: Eban Cambridge, Stephen P. Lyons, Armando “Mando” Perez-Serrato, Cenk Uygur)	No
Connecticut	Apr 2	Yes	No	Yes	Yes-withdrawn	(Note: Cenk Uygur)	Yes
New York	Apr 2	Yes	No	Yes	Yes-withdrawn	No	No
Rhode Island	Apr 2	Yes	No	No	Yes-withdrawn	No	Yes
Wisconsin	Apr 2	Yes	No	No	Yes-withdrawn	No	Yes
Alaska	Apr 13	Yes	No	No	No	No	No
Wyoming	Apr 13	Yes	Yes	Yes	Yes-withdrawn	Yes (Note: Stephen Lyons, David Michael Olscamp, Armando “Mando” Perez-Serrato)	Yes
Pennsylvania	Apr 23	Yes	No	No	Yes-withdrawn	No	No
New Hampshire (party-run)	Apr 27	Yes	No	No	No	No	No
Puerto Rico	Apr 28	Yes	No	Yes	Yes-withdrawn	No	No
Indiana	May 7	Yes	No	No	No	No	No
Maryland	May 14	Yes	No	Yes	Yes-withdrawn	No	Yes
Nebraska	May 14	Yes	No	No	Yes-withdrawn	No	No
West Virginia	May 14	Yes	Yes	No	Yes-withdrawn	Yes (Note: Stephen P. Lyons, Armando “Mando” Perez-Serrato)	No
Kentucky	May 21	Yes	No	Yes	Yes-withdrawn	No	Yes
Oregon	May 21	Yes	No	Yes	No	No	No
Idaho	May 23	Yes	Yes	Yes	Yes-withdrawn	Yes (Note: David Michael Olscamp)	No
District of Columbia	Jun 4	Yes	No	Yes	No	Yes (Note: Armando “Mando” Perez-Serrato)	Yes
Montana	Jun 4	Yes	No	No	No	No	Yes
New Jersey	Jun 4	Yes	No	No	No	Yes (Note: Terrisa Bukovinac)	Yes
New Mexico	Jun 4	Yes	No	Yes	No	No	Yes
South Dakota	Jun 4	Yes	No	Yes	Yes-withdrawn	Yes (Note: Armando “Mando” Perez-Serrato Gabriel Cornejo filed for inclusion but withdrew before the ballot was finalized.)	No
Guam	Jun 8	Yes	No	No	No	No	No
Virgin Islands	Jun 8	Yes	No	Yes	No	No	Yes
Delaware	None (Note: Primary cancelled.)	Yes	No	No	No	No	No
Florida	None	Yes	No	No	No	No	No
Total possible delegates		3,949	471	2,747	3,044	Armando Perez-Serrato: 1,157; Stephen Lyons: 829; Frankie Lozada: 755	1,423

== Republican primary ==
The following is a table of which candidates have received ballot access in which states.

Yes indicates that the candidate was on the ballot for the primary contest.
No indicates that the candidate did not appear on the ballot in that state's contest.
indicates that a candidate withdrew before the election but was still listed on the ballot.

Ballot access in the 2024 Republican presidential nominating contests
Contest	Date	Trump	Haley	Binkley	DeSantis	Hutchinson	Ramaswamy	Others	Ref
Iowa	Jan 15	Yes	Yes	Yes	Yes	Yes	Yes	(Note: Chris Christie)	
New Hampshire	Jan 23	Yes	Yes	Yes	Yes-withdrawn	Yes-withdrawn	Yes-withdrawn	Yes (Note: Scott Alan Ayers, Doug Burgum, Robert S. Carney Jr., John Anthony Castro, Chris Christie, Peter Jedick, Perry Johnson, Donald Kjornes, Mary Maxwell, Glenn J. McPeters, Scott Peterson Merrell, Darius L. Mitchell, Mike Pence, Tim Scott, Hirsh V. Singh, Samuel Howard Sloan, David Stuckenberg, Rachel Swift. Recognized Write-ins: Joe Biden (running as a Democrat), Dean Phillips (running as a Democrat), Marianne Williamson (running as a Democrat), Robert F. Kennedy Jr. (running as an Independent), Mark Greenstein (running as a Democrat), CeaseFire (not a candidate))	
Nevada primary (Note: This primary has not been officially sanctioned by the RNC.)	Feb 6	No	Yes	No	No	No	No	Yes (Note: John Anthony Castro, Heath V. Fulkerson, Mike Pence, Tim Scott, Hirsh V. Singh, Donald Kjornes, None of These Candidates)	
Nevada caucus	Feb 8	Yes	No	Yes	No	No	No	No	
Virgin Islands	Feb 8	Yes	Yes	No	Yes-withdrawn	No	Yes-withdrawn	(Note: Chris Christie, Perry Johnson)	
South Carolina	Feb 24	Yes	Yes	Yes	Yes-withdrawn	No	Yes-withdrawn	Yes (Note: Chris Christie, David Stuckenberg)	
Michigan primary	Feb 27	Yes	Yes	Yes-withdrawn	Yes-withdrawn	Yes-withdrawn	Yes-withdrawn	Yes-withdrawn	
Idaho	Mar 2	Yes	Yes	Yes-withdrawn	Yes-withdrawn	No	Yes-withdrawn	Yes-withdrawn	
Michigan caucus	Mar 2	Yes	Yes	No	No	No	No	No	
Missouri	Mar 2	Yes	Yes	No	No	No	No	Yes (Note: David Stuckenburg)	
District of Columbia	Mar 3	Yes	Yes	Yes-withdrawn	Yes-withdrawn	No	Yes-withdrawn	Yes (Note: Chris Christie, Doug Burgum, David Stuckenberg)	
North Dakota	Mar 4	Yes	Yes	Yes-withdrawn	No	No	No	Yes (Note: David Stuckenberg)	
Alabama	Mar 5	Yes	Yes	Yes-withdrawn	Yes-withdrawn	No	Yes-withdrawn	Yes (Note: Chris Christie, David Stuckenberg)	
Alaska	Mar 5	Yes	Yes	No	No	No	Yes-withdrawn	No	
Arkansas	Mar 5	Yes	Yes	Yes-withdrawn	Yes-withdrawn	Yes-withdrawn	Yes-withdrawn	Yes (Note: Doug Burgum, Chris Christie, David Stuckenberg)	
California	Mar 5	Yes	Yes	Yes-withdrawn	Yes-withdrawn	Yes-withdrawn	Yes-withdrawn	Yes (Note: Chris Christie, David Stuckenberg, Rachel Swift Recognized Write-in candidates: Hugo C Aguilar, Ryan Stephen Ehrenreich, Douglas Groves Doug Burgum filed for inclusion but withdrew before the ballot was finalized)	
Colorado	Mar 5	Yes	Yes	Yes-withdrawn	Yes-withdrawn	Yes-withdrawn	Yes-withdrawn	(Note: Chris Christie, Walter Iwachiw (write-in), Rachel Swift (write-in))	
Maine	Mar 5	Yes (Note: Trump was removed from the ballot by the Maine Secretary of State due to his participation in the January 6 attack, but the decision was placed on hold while the related case Colorado case of Anderson v. Griswold makes its way through the courts. On March 4, 2024, the U.S. Supreme Court ruled that Trump would not be removed from the ballot.)	Yes	Yes-withdrawn	Yes-withdrawn	No	Yes-withdrawn		
Massachusetts	Mar 5	Yes	Yes	Yes-withdrawn	Yes-withdrawn	Yes-withdrawn	Yes-withdrawn	Yes-withdrawn	
Minnesota	Mar 5	Yes	Yes	No	Yes-withdrawn	No	Yes-withdrawn	Yes-withdrawn	
North Carolina	Mar 5	Yes	Yes	Yes-withdrawn	Yes-withdrawn	Yes-withdrawn	Yes-withdrawn	Yes-withdrawn	
Oklahoma	Mar 5	Yes	Yes	Yes-withdrawn	Yes-withdrawn	Yes-withdrawn	Yes-withdrawn	Yes (Note: Chris Christie, David Stuckenberg)	
Tennessee	Mar 5	Yes	Yes	Yes-withdrawn	Yes-withdrawn	Yes-withdrawn	Yes-withdrawn	Yes (Note: Chris Christie, David Stuckenberg)	
Texas	Mar 5	Yes	Yes	Yes-withdrawn	Yes-withdrawn	Yes-withdrawn	Yes-withdrawn	Yes	
Utah	Mar 5	Yes	Yes	Yes-withdrawn	Yes-withdrawn	Yes-withdrawn	Yes-withdrawn	No	
Vermont	Mar 5	Yes	Yes	Yes-withdrawn	Yes-withdrawn	No	Yes-withdrawn	Yes-withdrawn	
Virginia	Mar 5	Yes	Yes	Yes-withdrawn	Yes-withdrawn	No	Yes-withdrawn	Yes-withdrawn	
American Samoa	Mar 8	Yes	Yes-withdrawn	No	No	No	No	No	
Georgia	Mar 12	Yes	Yes-withdrawn	Yes-withdrawn	Yes-withdrawn	Yes-withdrawn	Yes-withdrawn	Yes (Note: Doug Burgum, Chris Christie, Perry Johnson, Tim Scott, David Stuckenberg)	
Hawaii	Mar 12	Yes	Yes-withdrawn	Yes-withdrawn	Yes-withdrawn	No	Yes-withdrawn	Yes	
Mississippi	Mar 12	Yes	Yes-withdrawn	No	Yes-withdrawn	No	Yes-withdrawn	No	
Washington	Mar 12	Yes	Yes-withdrawn	No	Yes-withdrawn	No	Yes-withdrawn	Yes-withdrawn	
Northern Mariana Islands	Mar 15	Yes	Yes-withdrawn	No	No	No	No	No	
Guam	Mar 16	Yes	Yes-withdrawn	No	No	No	No	No	
Arizona	Mar 19	Yes	Yes-withdrawn	Yes-withdrawn	Yes-withdrawn	Yes-withdrawn	Yes-withdrawn	Yes (Note: John Anthony Castro, Chris Christie, David Stuckenberg)	
Florida	Mar 19	Yes	Yes-withdrawn	Yes-withdrawn	Yes-withdrawn	Yes-withdrawn	Yes-withdrawn	(Note: Chris Christie)	
Kansas	Mar 19	Yes	Yes-withdrawn	Yes-withdrawn	Yes-withdrawn	No	No	No	
Illinois	Mar 19	Yes	Yes-withdrawn	Yes-withdrawn	Yes-withdrawn	No	No	Yes-withdrawn	
Ohio	Mar 19	Yes	Yes-withdrawn	No	Yes-withdrawn	No	Yes-withdrawn	Yes-withdrawn	
Louisiana	Mar 23	Yes	Yes-withdrawn	Yes-withdrawn	Yes-withdrawn	Yes-withdrawn	Yes-withdrawn	Yes (Note: Chris Christie, David Stuckenberg, Rachel Swift)	
Connecticut	April 2	Yes	Yes-withdrawn	Yes-withdrawn	Yes-withdrawn	No	No	No	
New York	April 2	Yes	Yes-withdrawn	No	No	No	Yes-withdrawn	Yes-withdrawn	
Rhode Island	April 2	Yes	Yes-withdrawn	No	Yes-withdrawn	No	Yes-withdrawn	Yes-withdrawn	
Wisconsin	April 2	Yes	Yes-withdrawn	No	Yes-withdrawn	No	Yes-withdrawn	Yes-withdrawn	
Wyoming	Apr 20	Yes	No	No	No	No	No	No	
Puerto Rico	Apr 21	Yes	No	No	No	No	No	No	
Pennsylvania	Apr 23	Yes	Yes-withdrawn	No	No	No	No	No	
Indiana	May 7	Yes	Yes-withdrawn	No	No	No	No		
Maryland	May 14	Yes	Yes-withdrawn	No	No	No	No	No	
Nebraska	May 14	Yes	Yes-withdrawn	No	No	No	No	(Note: Perry Johnson)	
West Virginia	May 14	Yes	Yes-withdrawn	Yes-withdrawn	No	No	No	(Note: Rachel Swift, David Stuckenberg)	
Kentucky	May 21	Yes	Yes-withdrawn	Yes-withdrawn	Yes-withdrawn	No	Yes-withdrawn	Yes-withdrawn	
Oregon	May 21	Yes	No	No	No	No	No	No	
New Jersey	Jun 4	Yes	No	No	No	No	No	No	
Montana	Jun 4	Yes	No	No	No	No	No	No	
New Mexico	Jun 4	Yes	Yes-withdrawn	No	No	No	Yes-withdrawn	Yes-withdrawn	
Delaware	NA (Note: cancelled)	Yes	No	No	No	No	No	No	
South Dakota	NA	Yes	No	No	No	No	No	No	
Total possible delegates		2,429	2,232	1,533	1,707	1,014	1,718	Chris Christie: 1,653; David Stuckenberg: 895; Uncommitted: (Note: Includes No Preference, None of These Candidates, and Uninstructed) 634	

Candidates listed in italics have suspended their campaigns.

== Third party primaries ==
=== Libertarian primary ===
The following is a table of which candidates have received ballot access in which states. Yes indicates that the candidate was on the ballot for the primary contest, indicates that the candidate was a recognized write-in candidate, and No indicates that the candidate did not appear on the ballot in that state's contest. indicates that a candidate withdrew before the election but was still listed on the ballot. States not appearing in the table did not hold Libertarian presidential primaries.

Ballot access in the 2024 Libertarian presidential preference contests
State	Date	Ballay	Hornberger	Mapstead	Oliver	Olivier	Rectenwald	Smith	ter Maat	Other	NOTA	Ref
AZ	Jan 13	No	Yes	Yes	Yes	No	Yes	Yes	Yes	No	Yes	
IA (caucus)	Jan 15	Ballot access not required										
AL	Feb 3	Yes	Yes	Yes	Yes	No	Yes	No	Yes	Yes (Note: Joseph Collins Jr.)	No	
MS	Feb 24	Yes	Yes	Yes	Yes	Yes	Yes	Yes	Yes	Yes (Note: Joseph Collins Jr.)	Yes	
MN	Feb 27	All FEC filed candidates qualified										
IN	Mar 2	No	Yes	Yes	Yes	No	Yes	Yes	Yes	No	Yes	
PA	Mar 2	Yes	Yes	Write-in	Yes	Yes	Yes	Yes	Yes	Yes (Note: Joseph Collins Jr All write-ins counted)	No	
MA	Mar 5	No	Yes	Yes	Yes	No	Yes	No	Yes	No	Yes	
NC	Mar 5	Yes	Yes	Yes	Yes	No	Yes	Yes	Yes	Yes (Note: Toad Anderson, David "TrimeTaveler" Dunlap, Beau Lindsey)	Yes	
CA	Mar 5	Yes	No	No	Write-in	No	No	No	No	No	No	
OK	Mar 5	No	Yes	No	Yes	No	No	No	No	No	No	
CT	April 2	Yes	Yes	Yes	Yes	No	Yes	Yes	Yes	Yes (Note: Joseph Collins Jr.)	Yes	
ME	May 5	Write-in	Yes	Yes	Yes	Write-in	Write-in	Yes	Yes	(Note: All write-ins counted)	No	
NE	May 14	Yes	Yes	Yes	Yes	No	Yes	No	Yes	No	No	
NM	Jun 4	No	No	Yes	No	No	No	No	No	No	Yes	

=== Green primary ===
The following is a table of which candidates received ballot access in which states.
Yes indicates that the candidate was on the ballot for the primary contest
indicates that the candidate was a recognized write-in candidate
No indicates that the candidate did not appear on the ballot in that state's contest.
indicates that a candidate withdrew before the election but was still listed on the ballot.
States not listed in the table did not hold Green Party presidential primaries.

Ballot access in the 2024 Green presidential nominating contests
State	Date	Sherman	Stein	Zavala	Others	NOTA (Note: Includes 'No Preference', 'Uncommitted', and 'None of the Above')	Ref
KS	February 5	Yes	Yes	Yes	Yes (Note: Adam Hollick, Randy Toler)	Yes	
PA	March 4	Yes	Yes	Yes	(Note: All write-ins were counted)	Yes	
CA	March 5	No	Yes	Write-in	(Note: DaShaun Davis, Matthew Pruden)	No	
IL	March 16	Yes	Yes	Yes	No	Yes	
AZ	March 19	Yes	Yes	Yes	No	No	
NY	March 23	Yes	Yes	Yes	No	No	
WA	March 24	Yes	Yes	Yes	(Note: All write-ins were counted)	No	
TX	April 13	Yes	Yes	Yes	Yes (Note: DaShaun Davis, Randy Toler, Robert Cooke)	No	
WI	April 22	Yes	Yes	Yes	No	No	
CT	April 26	Yes	Yes	Yes	(Note: All write-ins were counted)	Yes	
TN	April 27	Yes	Yes	Yes	Yes (Note: DaShaun Davis, Randy Toler)	No	
OH	April 29	Yes	Yes	Yes	Yes (Note: DaShaun Davis, Randy Toler)	No	
MD	May 3	Yes	Yes	Yes	No	No	
ME (caucuses)	May 5	Ballot access not required					
UT	May 10	Yes	Yes	Yes	No	No	
WV	May 14	No	Yes	No	No	No	
IN	May 30	Yes	Yes	Yes	Yes (Note: DaShaun Davis, Robert Cooke IV, Randy Toler)	Yes	
DC	Jun 4	No	Write-in	No	No	No	
MT	Jun 4	No	No	No	No	Yes	
MI	Jul 15	Yes	Yes	Yes	Yes (Note: DaShaun Davis, Robert Cooke IV, Randy Toler)	No	
FL	Jul 30	Yes	Yes	Yes	Yes (Note: DaShaun Davis, Robert Cooke IV, Randy Toler)	No	

=== American Independent Party ===
The American Independent Party held a non-binding presidential preference primary in California on March 5, 2024. James Bradley was the only candidate listed on the ballot and defeated Andrew George Rummel, who was a recognized write-in candidate.

2024 California American Independent primary
Candidate	Votes	Percentage			
Candidate	Votes	Percentage	James Bradley	45,565	99.96%
Andrew George Rummel (write-in)	16	0.04%			
Total:	45,581	100.0%			

On April 29, 2024, the party announced that it had nominated independent presidential candidate Robert F. Kennedy Jr.

=== Legal Marijuana Now Party ===
The Legal Marijuana Now Party held its first-ever presidential nomination primary in Minnesota on Super Tuesday, March 5. This was the first presidential primary to be held in Minnesota for a third party since 1916. Krystal Gabel withdrew from the race during Legal Marijuana Now Party's candidate filing discussions. When Gabel asked to be removed from the ballot, after early voting had started on January 19, 2024, the Minnesota Secretary of State's office stated that changes cannot be made to the list of candidates after the list was certified 63 days prior to the election, and Gabel's name remained on ballots.

Five candidates appeared on the ballot:

- Edward Forchion, activist, and candidate for governor of New Jersey in 2021
- Rudy Reyes, archeologist, and national LMN Party chairperson
- Dennis Schuller, Minnesota LMN Party chairperson; former Richfield, Minnesota, municipal planning commission member (2008–2014)
- Vermin Supreme, performance artist, activist, and perennial candidate from Massachusetts; former Libertarian Party Judicial Committee member (2020–2022) (Also running for the Democratic nomination)
- Krystal Gabel, activist, and candidate for governor of Nebraska in 2018 (Withdrew January 26, 2024)

Of Minnesota's three major political parties, all of which included a write in option for their 2024 nominating primaries, only the Legal Marijuana Now party submitted to the Secretary of State a write in name to be counted, singer-songwriter Willie Nelson. Minnesota presidential delegates to the national party convention were awarded proportionally based on the primary results.

== See also ==
- 2024 United States presidential election
- Ballot access in the 2024 Republican Party presidential primaries
- Ballot access in the 2024 Democratic Party presidential primaries
- Third-party and independent candidates for the 2024 United States presidential election
