= 2024 United States presidential election in Kansas =

- November 5, 2024
- Turnout: 67.84% (▲1.9 pp)

Nominee	Donald Trump	Kamala Harris
Party	Republican	Democratic
Home state	Florida	California
Running mate	JD Vance	Tim Walz
Electoral vote	6	0
Popular vote	758,802	544,853
Percentage	57.16%	41.04%

Trump
40–50%
50–60%
60–70%
70–80%
80–90%
90–100%
Harris
40–50%
50–60%
60–70%
70–80%
80–90%
90–100%
Tie/No data
President before election
Joe Biden
Democratic
Elected President
Donald Trump
Republican

The 2024 United States presidential election in Kansas took place on Tuesday, November 5, 2024, as part of the 2024 United States elections in which all 50 states plus the District of Columbia participated. Kansas voters chose electors to represent them in the Electoral College via a popular vote. The state of Kansas has six electoral votes in the Electoral College, following reapportionment due to the 2020 United States census in which the state neither gained nor lost a seat.

A sparsely populated Great Plains state that has not voted Democrat for president since Lyndon B. Johnson in 1964, Kansas was considered by nearly all major news organizations to be safely Republican at the presidential level.

Kansas was won by the Republican nominee, former President Donald Trump, with a margin of 16.1%, a slight improvement from 4 years prior, although one of Trump’s smallest improvements throughout the nation by about 1.4%.

== Primary elections ==
=== Republican primary ===
The Kansas Republican primary was held on March 19, 2024, alongside primaries in Arizona, Florida, Illinois, and Ohio.

Kansas Republican primary, March 19, 2024
Candidate	Votes	Percentage	Actual delegate count		
Candidate	Votes	Percentage	Bound	Unbound	Total
Donald Trump	72,115	75.52%	39		39
Nikki Haley (withdrawn)	15,339	16.06%			
None of the Names Shown	4,982	5.22%			
Ron DeSantis (withdrawn)	2,543	2.66%			
Ryan Binkley (withdrawn)	508	0.53%			
Total:	95,487	100.00%	39		39

=== Democratic primary ===
The Kansas Democratic primary was held on March 19, 2024, alongside primaries in Arizona, Illinois, and Ohio.

2024 Kansas Democratic pres. primary
Candidate	Votes	%	Delegates
Joe Biden (incumbent)	35,906	83.67	33
Marianne Williamson	1,494	3.48	0
Dean Phillips (withdrawn)	566	1.32	0
Jason Palmer	516	1.20	0
None of the names	4,433	10.33	0
Total	42,915	100%	33

=== Green primary ===
The Kansas Green primary was held from January 22, 2024, to February 5, 2024. It was a held digitally under a ranked-choice voting system. Jill Stein won with 100% of the vote, being ranked first by all 7 voting party members. Stein automatically received Kansas's 4 delegates to the 2024 Green National Convention.

Kansas Green primary, January 22, 2024 – February 5, 2024
Candidate	Votes	Percentage	Delegate count
Jill Stein	7	100%	4
Total:	7	100%	4

== General election ==
=== Predictions ===
Source	Ranking	As of
Cook Political Report	Solid R	December 19, 2023
Inside Elections	Solid R	April 26, 2023
Sabato's Crystal Ball	Safe R	June 29, 2023
Decision Desk HQ/The Hill	Safe R	May 31, 2024
CNalysis	Very Likely R	November 4, 2024
CNN	Solid R	January 14, 2024
The Economist	Safe R	June 12, 2024
538	Solid R	October 3, 2024
NBC News	Safe R	October 6, 2024

=== Polling ===
Donald Trump vs. Kamala Harris

Poll source	Date(s) administered	Sample size (Note: Key: A – all adults RV – registered voters LV – likely voters V – unclear)	Margin of error	Donald Trump Republican	Kamala Harris Democratic	Other / Undecided
Fort Hays State University	September 26 – October 16, 2024	656 (A)	–	46%	37%	17% (Note: "I do not plan on voting/cannot vote" & "Neither of the top two candidates" with 7% each)
Fort Hays State University	September 26 – October 16, 2024	608 (A)	–	50%	39%	11% (Note: "Neither of the top two candidates" with 7%)
Fort Hays State University	September 26 – October 16, 2024	517 (RV)	–	48%	43%	9% (Note: "Neither of the top two candidates" with 6%)

Hypothetical polling with Donald Trump and Joe Biden

Donald Trump vs. Joe Biden

Poll source	Date(s) administered	Sample size	Margin of error	Donald Trump Republican	Joe Biden Democratic	Other / Undecided
John Zogby Strategies (Note: Poll conducted for Kennedy's campaign)	April 13–21, 2024	385 (LV)	–	48%	42%	10%
Emerson College	October 1–4, 2023	487 (RV)	± 4.4%	47%	31%	22%
Emerson College	October 27–29, 2022	1,000 (LV)	± 3.0%	50%	37%	13%
Emerson College	September 15–18, 2022	1,000 (LV)	± 3.0%	52%	36%	12%
Echelon Insights (Note: Poll sponsored by NetChoice)	August 31 – September 7, 2022	392 (LV)	± 7.5%	52%	41%	7%

Hypothetical polling with other candidates

Donald Trump vs. Robert F. Kennedy Jr.

Poll source	Date(s) administered	Sample size	Margin of error	Donald Trump Republican	Robert F. Kennedy Jr. Independent	Other / Undecided
John Zogby Strategies	April 13–21, 2024	385 (LV)	–	44%	42%	14%

Robert F. Kennedy Jr. vs. Joe Biden

Poll source	Date(s) administered	Sample size	Margin of error	Robert F. Kennedy Jr. Independent	Joe Biden Democratic	Other / Undecided
John Zogby Strategies	April 13–21, 2024	385 (LV)	–	53%	36%	11%

Ron DeSantis vs. Joe Biden

Poll source	Date(s) administered	Sample size	Margin of error	Ron DeSantis Republican	Joe Biden Democratic	Other / Undecided
Echelon Insights	August 31 – September 7, 2022	392 (LV)	± 7.5%	50%	39%	11%

=== Results ===
State House district results: Trump 40–50% 50–60% 60–70% 70–80% 80–90% / Harris 40–50% 50–60% 60–70% 70–80% 80–90%

2024 United States presidential election in Kansas
Party	Candidate	Votes	%	±%
Republican	Donald Trump; JD Vance	758,802	57.16%	+1.02%
Democratic	Kamala Harris; Tim Walz	544,853	41.04%	−0.47%
Independent	Robert F. Kennedy Jr. (withdrawn); Nicole Shanahan (withdrawn)	16,322	1.23%	N/A
Libertarian	Chase Oliver; Mike ter Maat	7,614	0.57%	−1.66%
Total votes		1,327,591	100.00%	N/A

==== By county ====
County	Donald Trump Republican		Kamala Harris Democratic		Various candidates Other parties		Margin		Total
County	#	%	#	%	#	%	#	%	Total
Allen	4,029	71.95%	1,445	25.80%	126	2.25%	2,584	46.14%	5,600
Anderson	2,998	79.08%	732	19.31%	61	1.61%	2,266	59.77%	3,791
Atchison	4,911	67.69%	2,201	30.34%	143	1.97%	2,710	37.35%	7,255
Barber	1,854	85.44%	288	13.27%	28	1.29%	1,566	72.17%	2,170
Barton	8,205	77.63%	2,207	20.88%	158	1.49%	5,998	56.75%	10,570
Bourbon	5,003	76.13%	1,444	21.97%	125	1.90%	3,559	54.15%	6,572
Brown	3,106	72.95%	1,065	25.01%	87	2.04%	2,041	47.93%	4,258
Butler	22,426	69.57%	9,150	28.38%	660	2.05%	13,276	41.18%	32,236
Chase	1,090	74.56%	348	23.80%	24	1.64%	742	50.75%	1,462
Chautauqua	1,299	85.07%	211	13.82%	17	1.11%	1,088	71.25%	1,527
Cherokee	6,584	75.53%	1,970	22.60%	163	1.87%	4,614	52.93%	8,717
Cheyenne	1,185	83.33%	206	14.49%	31	2.18%	979	68.85%	1,422
Clark	867	85.50%	129	12.72%	18	1.78%	738	72.78%	1,014
Clay	3,150	76.59%	867	21.08%	96	2.33%	2,283	55.51%	4,113
Cloud	3,218	79.52%	767	18.95%	62	1.53%	2,451	60.56%	4,047
Coffey	3,371	77.02%	934	21.34%	72	1.64%	2,437	55.68%	4,377
Comanche	727	83.18%	130	14.87%	17	1.95%	597	68.31%	874
Cowley	9,360	69.31%	3,919	29.02%	226	1.67%	5,441	40.29%	13,505
Crawford	10,084	61.74%	5,956	36.46%	294	1.80%	4,128	25.27%	16,334
Decatur	1,217	83.82%	215	14.81%	20	1.38%	1,002	69.01%	1,452
Dickinson	7,014	76.71%	1,989	21.75%	141	1.54%	5,025	54.95%	9,144
Doniphan	2,899	81.05%	626	17.50%	52	1.45%	2,273	63.54%	3,577
Douglas	17,523	30.19%	39,582	68.20%	936	1.61%	-22,059	-38.01%	58,041
Edwards	1,042	82.11%	213	16.78%	14	1.10%	829	65.33%	1,269
Elk	1,123	83.93%	191	14.28%	24	1.79%	932	69.66%	1,338
Ellis	9,743	72.11%	3,511	25.99%	257	1.90%	6,232	46.13%	13,511
Ellsworth	2,078	75.34%	636	23.06%	44	1.60%	1,442	52.28%	2,758
Finney	7,166	66.46%	3,425	31.77%	191	1.77%	3,741	34.70%	10,782
Ford	5,616	68.29%	2,461	29.92%	147	1.79%	3,155	38.36%	8,224
Franklin	8,773	69.04%	3,676	28.93%	259	2.04%	5,097	40.11%	12,708
Geary	5,288	57.71%	3,674	40.10%	201	2.19%	1,614	17.61%	9,163
Gove	1,227	87.89%	150	10.74%	19	1.36%	1,077	77.15%	1,396
Graham	1,055	81.97%	210	16.32%	22	1.71%	845	65.66%	1,287
Grant	1,793	80.77%	395	17.79%	32	1.44%	1,398	62.97%	2,220
Gray	1,837	83.77%	324	14.77%	32	1.46%	1,513	68.99%	2,193
Greeley	510	86.00%	75	12.65%	8	1.35%	435	73.36%	593
Greenwood	2,299	79.72%	541	18.76%	44	1.53%	1,758	60.96%	2,884
Hamilton	671	82.33%	131	16.07%	13	1.60%	540	66.26%	815
Harper	2,072	81.10%	437	17.10%	46	1.80%	1,635	63.99%	2,555
Harvey	9,591	59.62%	6,202	38.56%	293	1.82%	3,389	21.07%	16,086
Haskell	1,045	81.77%	221	17.29%	12	0.94%	824	64.48%	1,278
Hodgeman	817	84.58%	136	14.08%	13	1.35%	681	70.50%	966
Jackson	4,557	70.39%	1,799	27.79%	118	1.82%	2,758	42.60%	6,474
Jefferson	6,694	67.43%	3,030	30.52%	203	2.04%	3,664	36.91%	9,927
Jewell	1,370	87.04%	176	11.18%	28	1.78%	1,194	75.86%	1,574
Johnson	154,247	44.87%	183,451	53.36%	6,082	1.77%	-29,204	-8.49%	343,780
Kearny	1,082	83.17%	192	14.76%	27	2.08%	890	68.41%	1,301
Kingman	3,119	79.02%	753	19.08%	75	1.90%	2,366	59.94%	3,947
Kiowa	941	85.00%	151	13.64%	15	1.36%	790	71.36%	1,107
Labette	5,410	68.30%	2,385	30.11%	126	1.59%	3,025	38.19%	7,921
Lane	709	84.10%	111	13.17%	23	2.73%	598	70.94%	843
Leavenworth	22,055	60.35%	13,732	37.57%	760	2.08%	8,323	22.77%	36,547
Lincoln	1,233	81.82%	250	16.59%	24	1.59%	983	65.23%	1,507
Linn	4,093	81.60%	854	17.03%	69	1.38%	3,239	64.57%	5,016
Logan	1,186	84.71%	183	13.07%	31	2.21%	1,003	71.64%	1,400
Lyon	7,462	56.29%	5,515	41.60%	279	2.10%	1,947	14.69%	13,256
Marion	4,312	73.46%	1,429	24.34%	129	2.20%	2,883	49.11%	5,870
Marshall	3,644	73.35%	1,205	24.26%	119	2.40%	2,439	49.09%	4,968
McPherson	9,816	69.60%	4,021	28.51%	267	1.89%	5,795	41.09%	14,104
Meade	1,427	84.19%	247	14.57%	21	1.24%	1,180	69.62%	1,695
Miami	12,854	68.79%	5,472	29.29%	359	1.92%	7,382	39.51%	18,685
Mitchell	2,608	82.22%	528	16.65%	36	1.13%	2,080	65.57%	3,172
Montgomery	9,287	74.65%	2,934	23.58%	220	1.77%	6,353	51.07%	12,441
Morris	2,021	72.39%	721	25.82%	50	1.79%	1,300	46.56%	2,792
Morton	909	85.75%	131	12.36%	20	1.89%	778	73.40%	1,060
Nemaha	4,655	82.83%	888	15.80%	77	1.37%	3,767	67.03%	5,620
Neosho	4,961	73.13%	1,696	25.00%	127	1.87%	3,265	48.13%	6,784
Ness	1,205	88.41%	129	9.46%	29	2.13%	1,076	78.94%	1,363
Norton	1,882	82.91%	346	15.24%	42	1.85%	1,536	67.67%	2,270
Osage	5,736	72.68%	1,946	24.66%	210	2.66%	3,790	48.02%	7,892
Osborne	1,477	83.26%	261	14.71%	36	2.03%	1,216	68.55%	1,774
Ottawa	2,475	82.42%	476	15.85%	52	1.73%	1,999	66.57%	3,003
Pawnee	2,003	74.88%	625	23.36%	47	1.76%	1,378	51.51%	2,675
Phillips	2,356	85.77%	331	12.05%	60	2.18%	2,025	73.72%	2,747
Pottawatomie	9,811	72.83%	3,394	25.19%	267	1.98%	6,417	47.63%	13,472
Pratt	3,054	74.82%	954	23.37%	74	1.81%	2,100	51.45%	4,082
Rawlins	1,194	85.10%	176	12.54%	33	2.35%	1,018	72.56%	1,403
Reno	17,847	66.25%	8,554	31.75%	539	2.00%	9,293	34.50%	26,940
Republic	2,001	81.91%	396	16.21%	46	1.88%	1,605	65.70%	2,443
Rice	3,073	77.48%	825	20.80%	68	1.71%	2,248	56.68%	3,966
Riley	11,630	47.83%	12,063	49.62%	620	2.55%	-433	-1.78%	24,313
Rooks	2,153	84.96%	349	13.77%	32	1.26%	1,804	71.19%	2,534
Rush	1,315	81.88%	264	16.44%	27	1.68%	1,051	65.44%	1,606
Russell	2,632	79.73%	608	18.42%	61	1.85%	2,024	61.31%	3,301
Saline	15,069	64.88%	7,734	33.30%	423	1.82%	7,335	31.58%	23,226
Scott	1,843	86.32%	248	11.62%	44	2.06%	1,595	74.71%	2,135
Sedgwick	120,118	56.09%	90,506	42.26%	3,528	1.65%	29,612	13.83%	214,152
Seward	3,133	68.63%	1,354	29.66%	78	1.71%	1,779	38.97%	4,565
Shawnee	39,901	48.77%	40,308	49.26%	1,610	1.97%	-407	-0.50%	81,819
Sheridan	1,229	89.51%	126	9.18%	18	1.31%	1,103	80.34%	1,373
Sherman	2,161	83.34%	379	14.62%	53	2.04%	1,782	68.72%	2,593
Smith	1,675	83.50%	300	14.96%	31	1.55%	1,375	68.54%	2,006
Stafford	1,548	81.09%	326	17.08%	35	1.83%	1,222	64.01%	1,909
Stanton	537	80.87%	115	17.32%	12	1.81%	422	63.55%	664
Stevens	1,595	86.92%	210	11.44%	30	1.63%	1,385	75.48%	1,835
Sumner	7,810	74.04%	2,527	23.95%	212	2.01%	5,283	50.08%	10,549
Thomas	3,007	82.07%	597	16.29%	60	1.64%	2,410	65.78%	3,664
Trego	1,343	84.63%	216	13.61%	28	1.76%	1,127	71.01%	1,587
Wabaunsee	2,816	73.41%	944	24.61%	76	1.98%	1,872	48.80%	3,836
Wallace	686	91.71%	52	6.95%	10	1.34%	634	84.76%	748
Washington	2,263	83.81%	396	14.67%	41	1.52%	1,867	69.15%	2,700
Wichita	740	86.05%	107	12.44%	13	1.51%	633	73.60%	860
Wilson	2,894	80.32%	647	17.96%	62	1.72%	2,247	62.36%	3,603
Woodson	1,205	80.01%	282	18.73%	19	1.26%	923	61.29%	1,506
Wyandotte	18,867	37.29%	30,938	61.14%	797	1.58%	-12,071	-23.85%	50,602
Totals	758,802	57.16%	544,853	41.04%	23,936	1.80%	213,949	16.12%	1,327,591

==== By congressional district ====
Trump won three of four congressional districts.

District	Trump	Harris	Representative
1st	64.72%	33.45%	Tracey Mann
2nd	58.89%	39.21%	Jake LaTurner (118th Congress)
2nd	58.89%	39.21%	Derek Schmidt (119th Congress)
3rd	47.06%	51.16%	Sharice Davids
4th	60.79%	37.50%	Ron Estes

== Analysis ==
In recent years, Democrats have seen some success in the state, such as defeating the 2022 Kansas abortion referendum and holding the governorship since 2019. This leftward shift has been attributed to the growth of the Kansas City metropolitan area, more specifically Johnson County, the state's most populous, which supported Joe Biden four years prior, the first win for a Democrat in this county since 1916. While Democrats had hoped that their margin of defeat would narrow further after favorable polls and Biden's favorable results compared to 2016, Kansas instead shifted to the right, with Trump improving on his margin and Republicans in the state legislature expanding their supermajorities.

Trump improved on his 14.6% margin from 2020, albeit by only 1.5% compared to the national average of about 6%, meaning Kansas voted to the right of the nation by a smaller margin in 2024. As such, Trump is the first Republican to win the White House without Johnson County since William McKinley in 1896, and the first since Kansas achieved statehood to win without Riley County, home to Fort Riley and Kansas State University, and Shawnee County, home to the state capital of Topeka (though he was less than 500 votes away from winning each of the latter two counties). Johnson County was the only county that supported Biden in 2020 in which Kamala Harris improved the Democratic margin.

== See also ==
- United States presidential elections in Kansas
- 2024 United States presidential election
- 2024 Democratic Party presidential primaries
- 2024 Republican Party presidential primaries
- 2024 United States elections

== Notes ==
Partisan clients
