= 2024 Kansas Democratic presidential primary =

- March 19, 2024

39 delegates (33 pledged, 6 unpledged) to the Democratic National Convention

Candidate	Joe Biden	None of the names
Home state	Delaware	–
Delegate count	33	0
Popular vote	35,906	4,433
Percentage	83.7%	10.3%
County results
Biden
50 – 60%
60 – 70%
70 – 80%
80 – 90%
>90%
None of the names
40 – 50%
60 – 70%
Tie
30 – 40%

The 2024 Kansas Democratic presidential primary took place on March 19, 2024, as part of the Democratic Party primaries for the 2024 presidential election, alongside three other states. 33 delegates to the Democratic National Convention were allocated to presidential candidates in a closed primary, with 6 additional unpledged delegates. The contest was the first state-run presidential primary in the history of Kansas and was held on the same day as the primaries of Arizona, Illinois, and Ohio.

President Joe Biden won all delegates in a landslide, but over 10% of the voters opted to choose the option None of the names shown, which also won three small counties Ness, Rawlins, and Sheridan. Kansas City activist groups for the Uncommitted National Movement, including the Palestinian-led group Al-Hadaf KC and Free Palestine KC, encouraged to choose 'None of the names' as a protest vote against the Biden administration’s handling of the war between Israel and Hamas. In Greeley County, there was a tie (of three votes cast) between Joe Biden, None of the names shown, and Marianne Williamson.

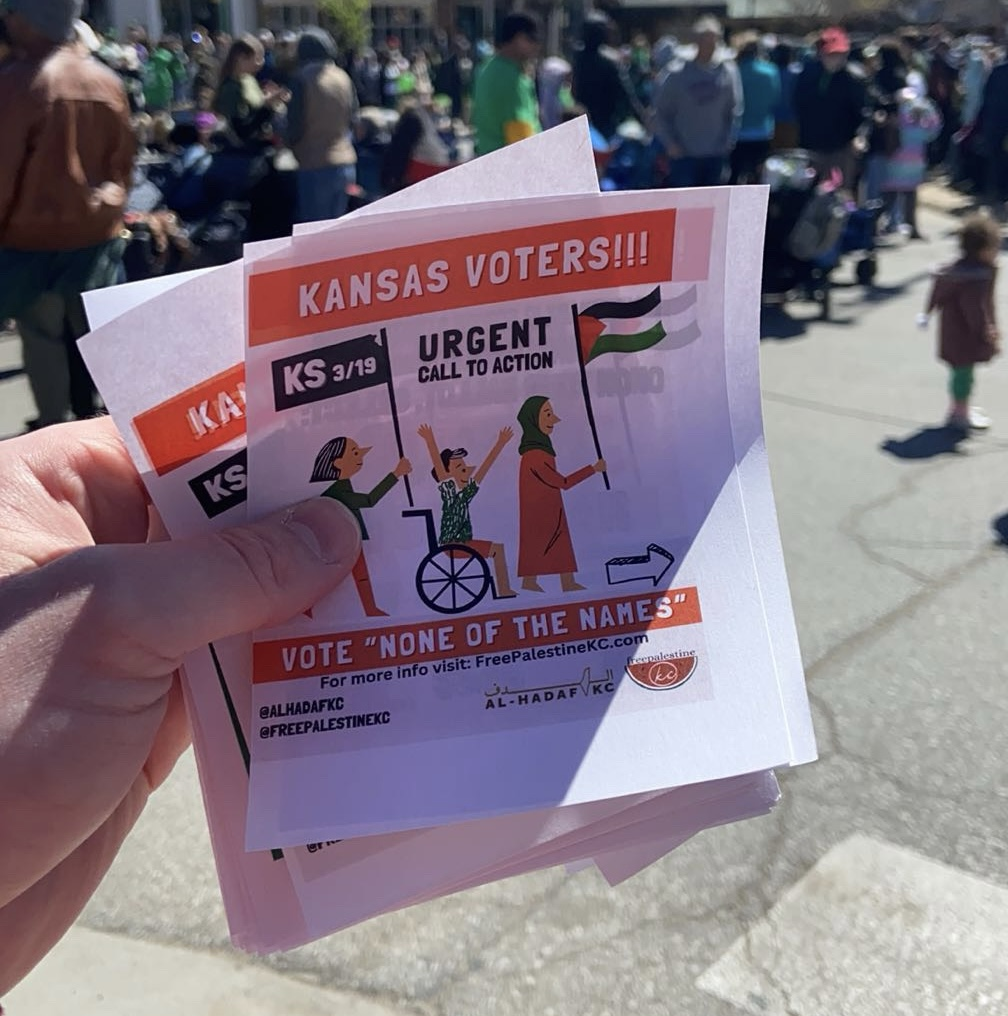
Campaign flyer as a part of the Uncommitted National Movement in the Kansas Democratic Primary encouraging voters to vote for “none of the names” instead of then-incumbent president Joe Biden

== Candidates ==
The following candidates achieved ballot access.

- Joe Biden
- Jason Palmer
- Dean Phillips (withdrawn)
- Marianne Williamson

The option for "None of the names" or "None of the names shown", similar to the often used "Uncommitted" in many states, was also put on the ballot due to state law.

== Results ==
2024 Kansas Democratic pres. primary
Candidate	Votes	%	Delegates
Joe Biden (incumbent)	35,906	83.67	33
Marianne Williamson	1,494	3.48	0
Dean Phillips (withdrawn)	566	1.32	0
Jason Palmer	516	1.20	0
None of the names	4,433	10.33	0
Total	42,915	100%	33

== See also ==
- 2024 Democratic Party presidential primaries
- 2024 Kansas Republican presidential primary
- 2024 United States presidential election in Kansas
- 2024 United States elections
