= 2024 Guam presidential caucuses =

2024 United States presidential caucuses in Guam
- 2024 Guam Democratic presidential caucus
- June 8, 2024

12 delegates (7 pledged, 5 unpledged) to the Democratic National Convention
Candidate	Joe Biden
Home state	Delaware
Delegate count	7
Popular vote	Uncontested
Percentage	100%
- 2024 Guam Republican presidential caucus
- March 16, 2024

9 Republican National Convention delegates

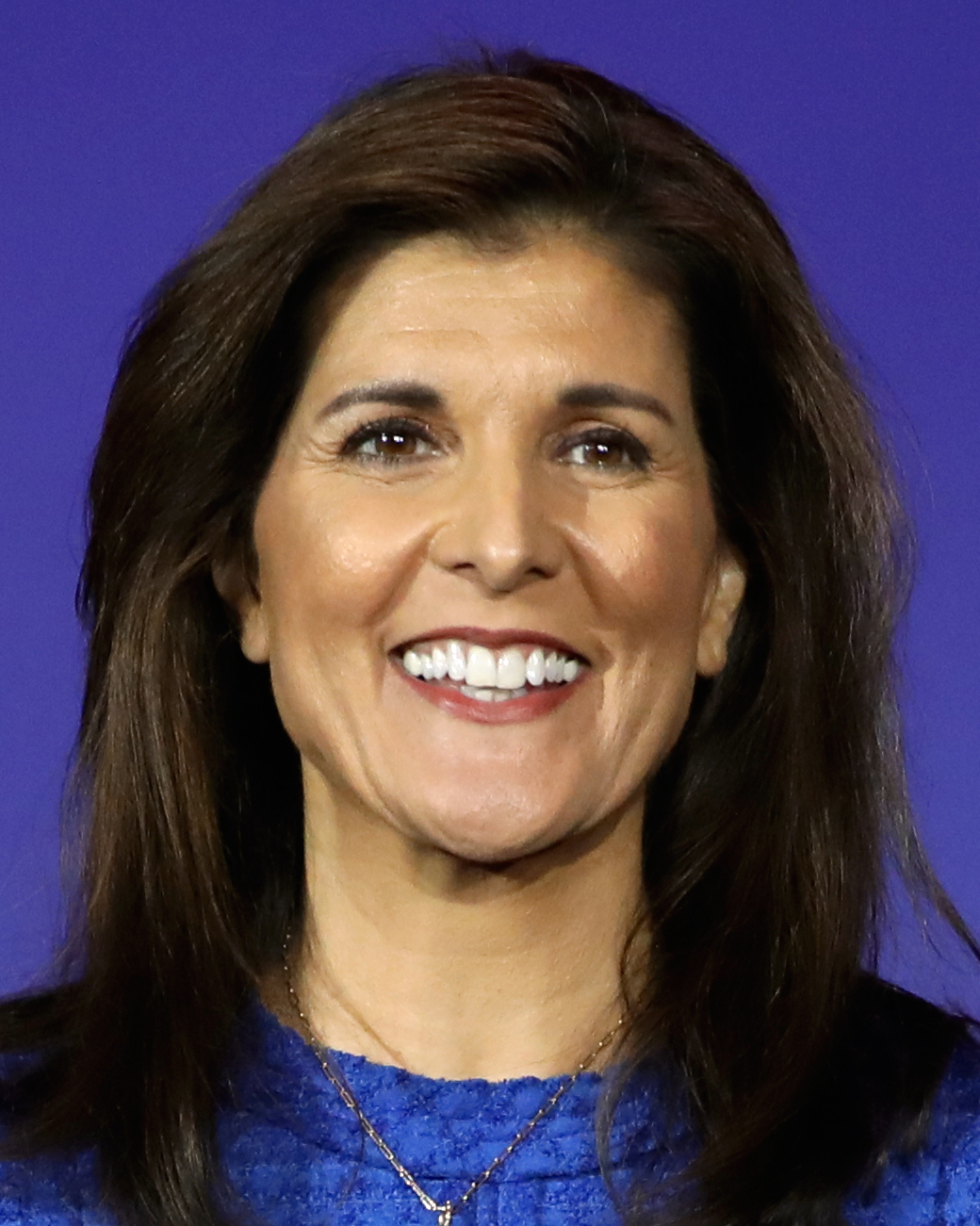
Candidate	Donald Trump	Nikki Haley (withdrawn)
Home state	Florida	South Carolina
Delegate count	9	0
Popular vote	178	0
Percentage	100%	0%

Although Guam did not participate in the 2024 presidential election as a U.S. territory and not a state, it does participate in the presidential primaries and caucuses. Incumbent president Joe Biden for the Democratic Party and former president Donald Trump for the Republican Party were both virtually unopposed in winning their parties' respective caucuses in June and March.

== Democratic caucus ==
The 2024 Guam Democratic presidential caucus was held on Saturday, June 8, 2024, as part of the Democratic Party primaries and caucuses, alongside the U.S. Virgin Islands caucuses on the same day. 7 delegates to the Democratic National Convention were allocated in a closed caucus, with 5 additional unpledged delegates. Incumbent president Joe Biden ran originally for re-election, and had already clinched the presumptive Democratic nomination on March 12. Biden ran unopposed in the caucus, so only individuals to serve as his delegates were elected.

=== Delegates ===
Seven caucus delegates were elected on June 8:

- Peter John Cruz
- Judith Won Pat
- Francis E. Santos
- Robert "Bobby" Alvarez
- Sarah Thomas Nededog
- Taling Taitano
- Lawrence Aicaro

The following five delegates were automatic delegates (superdelegates):

- Lou Leon Guerrero, governor
- Tony Babuata, party chairman
- Rikki Orsini, vice chairwoman
- Rory Respicio, majority leader of the Guam Legislature
- Regine Biscoe Lee, former senator and former party chairwoman

=== Results ===
Guam Democratic presidential caucus, June 8, 2024
Candidate	Votes	%	Delegates
Joe Biden (incumbent)	Unopposed	100.0	7
Total	—	100%	7

== Republican caucus ==
The 2024 Guam Republican presidential caucus was held on Saturday, March 16, 2024, as part of the Republican Party primaries and caucuses. The Republican Party of Guam officially convened for a party convention to allocate all nine delegates for the territory to former president Donald Trump, who had become the presumptive nominee after clinching the majority of delegates on March 12. The party formally conducted a non-binding straw poll between Trump and Nikki Haley, the former governor of South Carolina, although she had withdrawn from the race ten days before. Despite this Trump won all 178 votes in the straw poll vote.

=== Delegates ===
At the territorial convention, members of the party elected the following nine individuals to represent Guam at the 2024 Republican National Convention:

- James Moylan, delegate to the U.S. House of Representatives
- Frank Blas Jr., minority leader of the Legislature of Guam
- Shawn Gumataotao, party chairman
- Thelma Hechanova, first vice chair
- Marvin Crisostomo, second vice chair
- Tammy Bamba, party secretary
- Evelyn Casil, party treasurer
- Juan Carlos Benitez, member of the Republican National Committee
- Shirley Mabini-Young, member of the Republican National Committee

=== Results ===
Guam Republican presidential caucuses, March 16, 2024
Candidate	Votes	Percentage	Actual delegate count		
Candidate	Votes	Percentage	Bound	Unbound	Total
Donald Trump	178	100.00%	9		9
Nikki Haley (withdrawn)	0	0.00%	0		0
Total:	178	100.00%	9		9

== See also ==
- 2024 United States presidential straw poll in Guam
