= 2024 Illinois Democratic presidential primary =

- March 19, 2024

177 delegates (147 pledged, 30 unpledged) to the Democratic National Convention

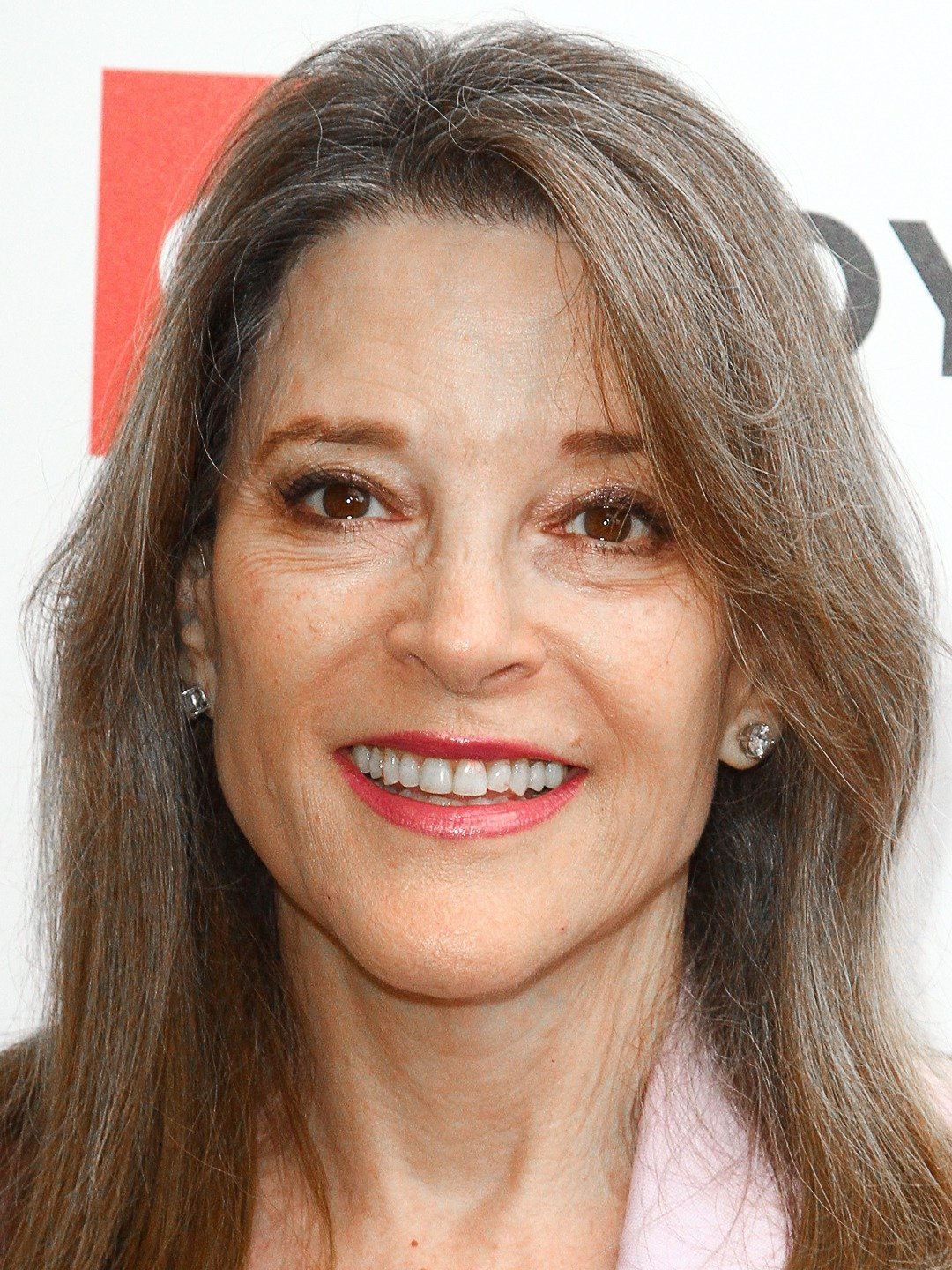
| Candidate | Joe Biden | Marianne Williamson |
| Home state | Delaware | Washington, D.C. |
| Delegate count | 147 | 0 |
| Popular vote | 739,646 | 28,777 |
| Percentage | 91.5% | 3.6% |
County results
Biden
80 – 90%
>90%

The 2024 Illinois Democratic presidential primary took place on March 19, 2024, as part of the Democratic Party primaries for the 2024 presidential election, alongside three other states. 147 delegates to the Democratic National Convention were allocated in an open primary, with 30 additional unpledged delegates. The contest was held alongside the primaries of Arizona, Kansas, and Ohio.

President Joe Biden again won all delegates with little opposition, receiving more than 80% of the vote in every county. Marianne Williamson and Dean Phillips placed second and third the second time on this day (the ninth time it happened overall).

Unlike many states, individual district delegates were elected directly by voters, with the slate of statewide delegates selected by the district delegates afterwards.

== Candidates ==
The petition circulation period for a candidate to place their name on the ballot began October 7, 2023, and ended January 5, 2024. Each candidate needed no less than 3,000 and no more than 5,000 signatures statewide. During the January 4, 2024, to January 5, 2024, filing period, four candidates filed to run in the Democratic primary.

- Joe Biden
- Frankie Lozada (withdrawn)
- Dean Phillips (withdrawn)
- Marianne Williamson

== Endorsements ==
Joe Biden

U.S. Presidents

- Barack Obama, 44th President of the United States (2009–2017), U.S. Senator from Illinois (2005–2008)

U.S. Senators

- Tammy Duckworth, U.S. Senator from Illinois (2017–present), U.S. Representative from IL-08 (2013–2017)

U.S. Representatives

- Nikki Budzinski, U.S. Representative from IL-13 (2023–present)
- Delia Ramirez, U.S. Representative from IL-03 (2023–present)
- Lauren Underwood, U.S. Representative from IL-14 (2019–present)

Statewide officials

- J. B. Pritzker, 43rd Governor of Illinois (2019–present)

Mayors

- Brandon Johnson, 57th Mayor of Chicago (2023–present)

Organizations

- Democratic Party of Illinois

== Results ==
=== Statewide ===
2024 Illinois Democratic pres. primary
| Candidate | Votes | % | Delegates |
|---|---|---|---|
| Joe Biden (incumbent) | 739,646 | 91.48 | 147 |
| Marianne Williamson | 28,777 | 3.56 | 0 |
| Dean Phillips (withdrawn) | 25,615 | 3.17 | 0 |
| Frankie Lozada (withdrawn) | 14,513 | 1.79 | 0 |
| Total | 808,551 | 100% | 147 |

=== Delegates elected by district ===
As only the Biden campaign submitted delegates, Biden won these delegates by default.

2024 Illinois 1st District Democratic Delegate
| Party | Candidate | Votes | % |
|---|---|---|---|
| Democratic | Jacqueline Collins (Biden) | | |
| Democratic | Marcus C. Evans Jr. (Biden) | | |
| Democratic | Michelle Harris (Biden) | | |
| Democratic | Rikki D. Jones (Biden) | | |
| Democratic | Robert G. Reiter, Jr. (Biden) | | |
| Democratic | Lamont Robinson (Biden) | | |
| Democratic | Elgie Sims (Biden) | | |
| Total votes | | | |

2024 Illinois 2nd District Democratic Delegate
| Party | Candidate | Votes | % |
|---|---|---|---|
| Democratic | Vernard Alsberry Jr. (Biden) | | |
| Democratic | Sheila Chalmers-Currin (Biden) | | |
| Democratic | Ertharin Cousin (Biden) | | |
| Democratic | Alex Gallegos (Biden) | | |
| Democratic | Napoleon Harris (Biden) | | |
| Democratic | Debbie Meyers-Martin (Biden) | | |
| Total votes | | | |

2024 Illinois 3rd District Democratic Delegate
| Party | Candidate | Votes | % |
|---|---|---|---|
| Democratic | Oswaldo Alvarez (Biden) | | |
| Democratic | Eva-Dina Delgado (Biden) | | |
| Democratic | Lilian Jiménez (Biden) | | |
| Democratic | Erik Martinez (Biden) | | |
| Democratic | Gilbert "Gil" Villegas (Biden) | | |
| Democratic | Jackie Williamson (Biden) | | |
| Democratic | Augusto Gonzalez (Biden) | | |
| Total votes | | | |

2024 Illinois 4th District Democratic Delegate
| Party | Candidate | Votes | % |
|---|---|---|---|
| Democratic | Javier Loera Cervantes (Biden) | | |
| Democratic | Norma Hernandez (Biden) | | |
| Democratic | Theresa Mah (Biden) | | |
| Democratic | Aaron Ortiz (Biden) | | |
| Democratic | Beth Zavala (Biden) | | |
| Total votes | | | |

2024 Illinois 5th District Democratic Delegate
| Party | Candidate | Votes | % |
|---|---|---|---|
| Democratic | Valerie Alexander (Biden) | | |
| Democratic | Aurora Austriaco (Biden) | | |
| Democratic | Margaret Croke (Biden) | | |
| Democratic | Sara Feigenholtz (Biden) | | |
| Democratic | Marcelino Garcia (Biden) | | |
| Democratic | Timmy Knudsen (Biden) | | |
| Democratic | Brian J. McPartlin (Biden) | | |
| Democratic | Eli Moog (Biden) | | |
| Total votes | | | |

2024 Illinois 6th District Democratic Delegate
| Party | Candidate | Votes | % |
|---|---|---|---|
| Democratic | Sonia Desai Bhagwakar (Biden) | | |
| Democratic | Kelly Burke (Biden) | | |
| Democratic | Deb Conroy (Biden) | | |
| Democratic | Bill Cunningham (Biden) | | |
| Democratic | Christopher Espinoza (Biden) | | |
| Democratic | Tim Moriarty (Biden) | | |
| Total votes | | | |

2024 Illinois 7th District Democratic Delegate
| Party | Candidate | Votes | % |
|---|---|---|---|
| Democratic | Kam Buckner (Biden) | | |
| Democratic | Walter Burnett Jr. (Biden) | | |
| Democratic | Patricia Dowell (Biden) | | |
| Democratic | LaShawn Ford (Biden) | | |
| Democratic | Rory Hoskins (Biden) | | |
| Democratic | Nicole Lee (Biden) | | |
| Democratic | Emma Mitts (Biden) | | |
| Democratic | Anna Valencia (Biden) | | |
| Total votes | | | |

2024 Illinois 8th District Democratic Delegate
| Party | Candidate | Votes | % |
|---|---|---|---|
| Democratic | Yasmeen Bankole (Biden) | | |
| Democratic | Fred Crespo (Biden) | | |
| Democratic | Ken Mejia-Beal (Biden) | | |
| Democratic | Kevin Morrison (Biden) | | |
| Democratic | Elizabeth Penesis (Biden) | | |
| Total votes | | | |

2024 Illinois 9th District Democratic Delegate
| Party | Candidate | Votes | % |
|---|---|---|---|
| Democratic | Christopher J. Dunn (Biden) | | |
| Democratic | Laura Fine (Biden) | | |
| Democratic | Jennifer Gong-Gershowitz (Biden) | | |
| Democratic | Hoan Huynh (Biden) | | |
| Democratic | Daniel J. Montgomery (Biden) | | |
| Democratic | Josina Morita (Biden) | | |
| Total votes | | | |

2024 Illinois 10th District Democratic Delegate
| Party | Candidate | Votes | % |
|---|---|---|---|
| Democratic | Adriane Johnson (Biden) | | |
| Democratic | Bob Morgan (Biden) | | |
| Democratic | Julie Morrison (Biden) | | |
| Democratic | Nancy Rotering (Biden) | | |
| Democratic | Victor Shi (Biden) | | |
| Democratic | Anthony Vega (Biden) | | |
| Total votes | | | |

2024 Illinois 11th District Democratic Delegate
| Party | Candidate | Votes | % |
|---|---|---|---|
| Democratic | Casey Fitzgerald (Biden) | | |
| Democratic | Mark Guethle (Biden) | | |
| Democratic | Kenneth Harris (Biden) | | |
| Democratic | Barbara Hernandez (Biden) | | |
| Democratic | Kathya Morales (Biden) | | |
| Total votes | | | |

2024 Illinois 12th District Democratic Delegate
| Party | Candidate | Votes | % |
|---|---|---|---|
| Democratic | Brandi Bradley (Biden) | | |
| Democratic | Natalie Phelps Finnie (Biden) | | |
| Democratic | Patrick H. Scates (Biden) | | |

2024 Illinois 13th District Democratic Delegate
| Party | Candidate | Votes | % |
|---|---|---|---|
| Democratic | Christopher Belt (Biden) | | |
| Democratic | Tim Drea (Biden) | | |
| Democratic | Andy Manar (Biden) | | |
| Democratic | Cameron Joost Stevens (Biden) | | |
| Democratic | Katie Stuart (Biden) | | |
| Democratic | Doris Turner (Biden) | | |
| Total votes | | | |

2024 Illinois 14th District Democratic Delegate
| Party | Candidate | Votes | % |
|---|---|---|---|
| Democratic | Arian Ahmadpour (Biden) | | |
| Democratic | Linda Holmes (Biden) | | |
| Democratic | Asaf G. Manzo (Biden) | | |
| Democratic | Darla Underwood (Biden) | | |
| Democratic | Alex Zapien (Biden) | | |
| Total votes | | | |

2024 Illinois 15th District Democratic Delegate
| Party | Candidate | Votes | % |
|---|---|---|---|
| Democratic | Jay Briney (Biden) | | |
| Democratic | Liz Brown-Reeves (Biden) | | |
| Democratic | Julie Curry (Biden) | | |
| Democratic | Jimmy Naville (Biden) | | |
| Total votes | | | |

2024 Illinois 16th District Democratic Delegate
| Party | Candidate | Votes | % |
|---|---|---|---|
| Democratic | Sarah M. Bingaman (Biden) | | |
| Democratic | John Daniel (Biden) | | |
| Democratic | Madi Houser (Biden) | | |
| Democratic | Ashwin Puri (Biden) | | |
| Total votes | | | |

2024 Illinois 17th District Democratic Delegate
| Party | Candidate | Votes | % |
|---|---|---|---|
| Democratic | Sharon Chung (Biden) | | |
| Democratic | Pam Davidson (Biden) | | |
| Democratic | Jehan Gordon-Booth (Biden) | | |
| Democratic | Dave Koehler (Biden) | | |
| Democratic | Maurice A. West II (Biden) | | |
| Total votes | | | |

== Polling ==
| Poll source | Date(s) administered | Sample size (Note: Key: A – all adults RV – registered voters LV – likely voters V – unclear) | Margin of error | Joe Biden | Robert F. Kennedy Jr. | Marianne Williamson | Other / Undecided |
|---|---|---|---|---|---|---|---|
| | March 6, 2024 | Phillips suspends his candidacy | | | | | |
| | February 28, 2024 | Williamson re-launches her candidacy | | | | | |
| | February 7, 2024 | Williamson suspends her candidacy | | | | | |
| | October 27, 2023 | Phillips announces his candidacy | | | | | |
| | October 9, 2023 | Kennedy withdraws from the primaries | | | | | |
| Cor Strategies | Aug 24–27, 2023 | – (RV) | – | 81% | 6% | 2% | 11% |

Hypothetical polling

| Poll source | Date(s) administered | Sample size | Margin of error | Stacey Abrams | Pete Buttigieg | Kamala Harris | Amy Klobuchar | Gavin Newsom | J. B. Pritzker | Bernie Sanders | Elizabeth Warren | Other / Undecided |
|---|---|---|---|---|---|---|---|---|---|---|---|---|
| Cor Strategies | Aug 24–27, 2023 | – (RV) | – | 9% | 7% | 28% | 7% | 5% | 14% | 9% | 4% | 17% |

== See also ==
- 2024 Illinois Republican presidential primary
- 2024 Democratic Party presidential primaries
- 2024 United States presidential election in Illinois
