= 2024 New Mexico Democratic presidential primary =

- June 4, 2024

45 delegates (34 pledged, 11 unpledged) to the Democratic National Convention

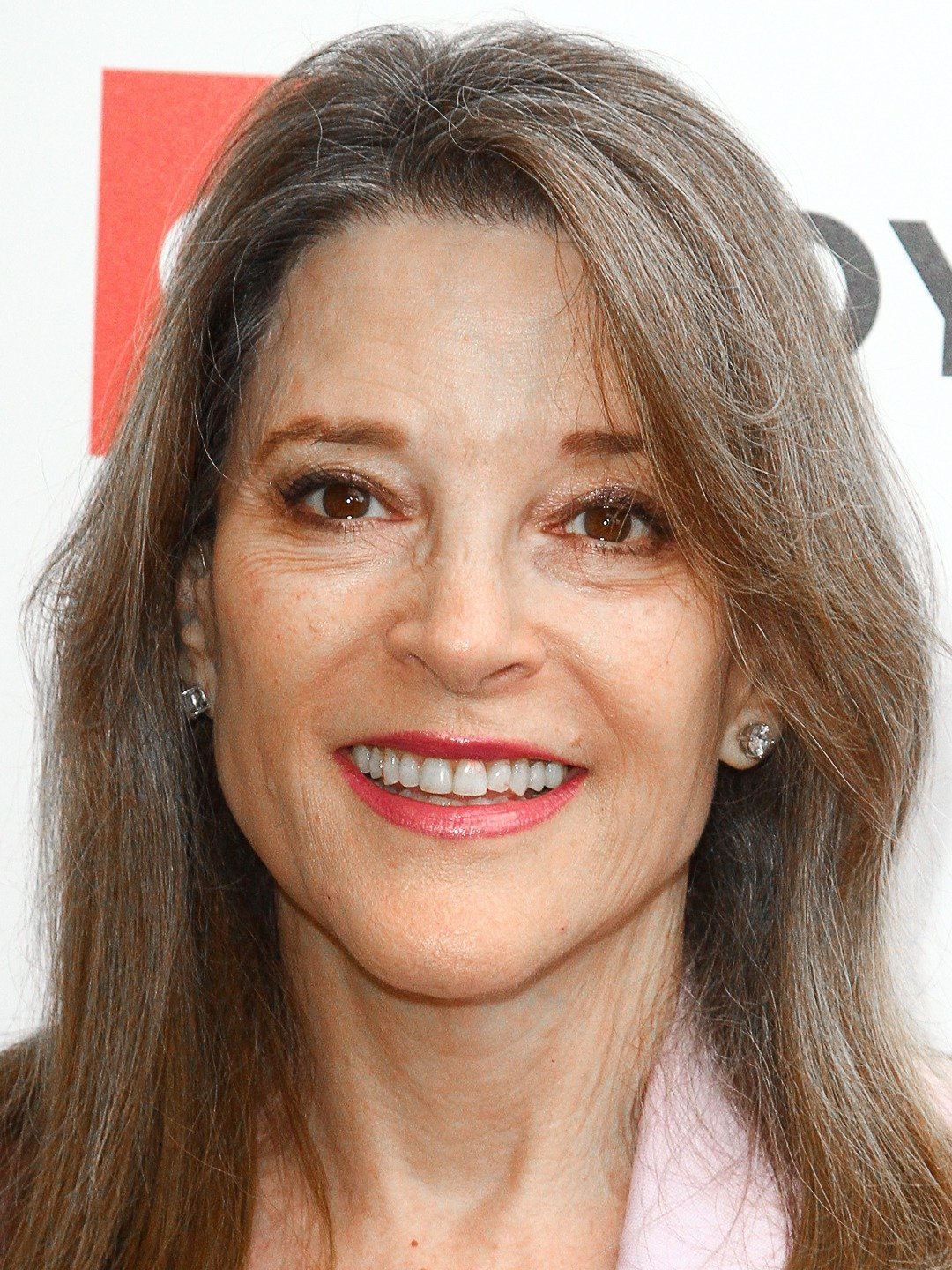
Candidate	Joe Biden	Uncommitted Delegate	Marianne Williamson
Home state	Delaware	–	Washington, D.C.
Delegate count	34	0	0
Popular vote	111,049	12,938	8,935
Percentage	83.5%	9.7%	6.7%
County results
Biden
60–70%
70–80%
80–90%

The 2024 New Mexico Democratic presidential primary was held on June 4, 2024, one of the last states among four other primaries, as part of the Democratic Party primaries for the 2024 presidential election. 34 delegates to the Democratic National Convention were allocated in a closed primary, with 11 additional unpledged delegates.

Incumbent President Joe Biden wanted to run for a second term and had already won most delegates. Biden won the primary and all delegates ahead of the local campaign for uncommitted delegates and author Marianne Williamson.

== Candidates ==
The following candidates were certified by the presidential primary nominating committee in December 2023:

- Joe Biden
- Marianne Williamson
- Dean Phillips

Phillips had since withdrawn from the ballot, as he suspended his campaign. Like many presidential primaries, it included an option for Uncommitted.

== Results ==
New Mexico Democratic primary, June 4, 2024
Candidate	Votes	%	Delegates
Joe Biden (incumbent)	111,049	83.54	34
Marianne Williamson	8,935	6.72	0
Uncommitted Delegate	12,938	9.73	0
Total	132,922	100%	34

== See also ==
- 2024 New Mexico Republican presidential primary
- 2024 Democratic Party presidential primaries
- 2024 United States presidential election
- 2024 United States presidential election in New Mexico
- 2024 United States elections
