= 2024 South Dakota Democratic presidential primary =

- June 4, 2024

20 delegates (16 pledged, 4 unpledged) to the Democratic National Convention

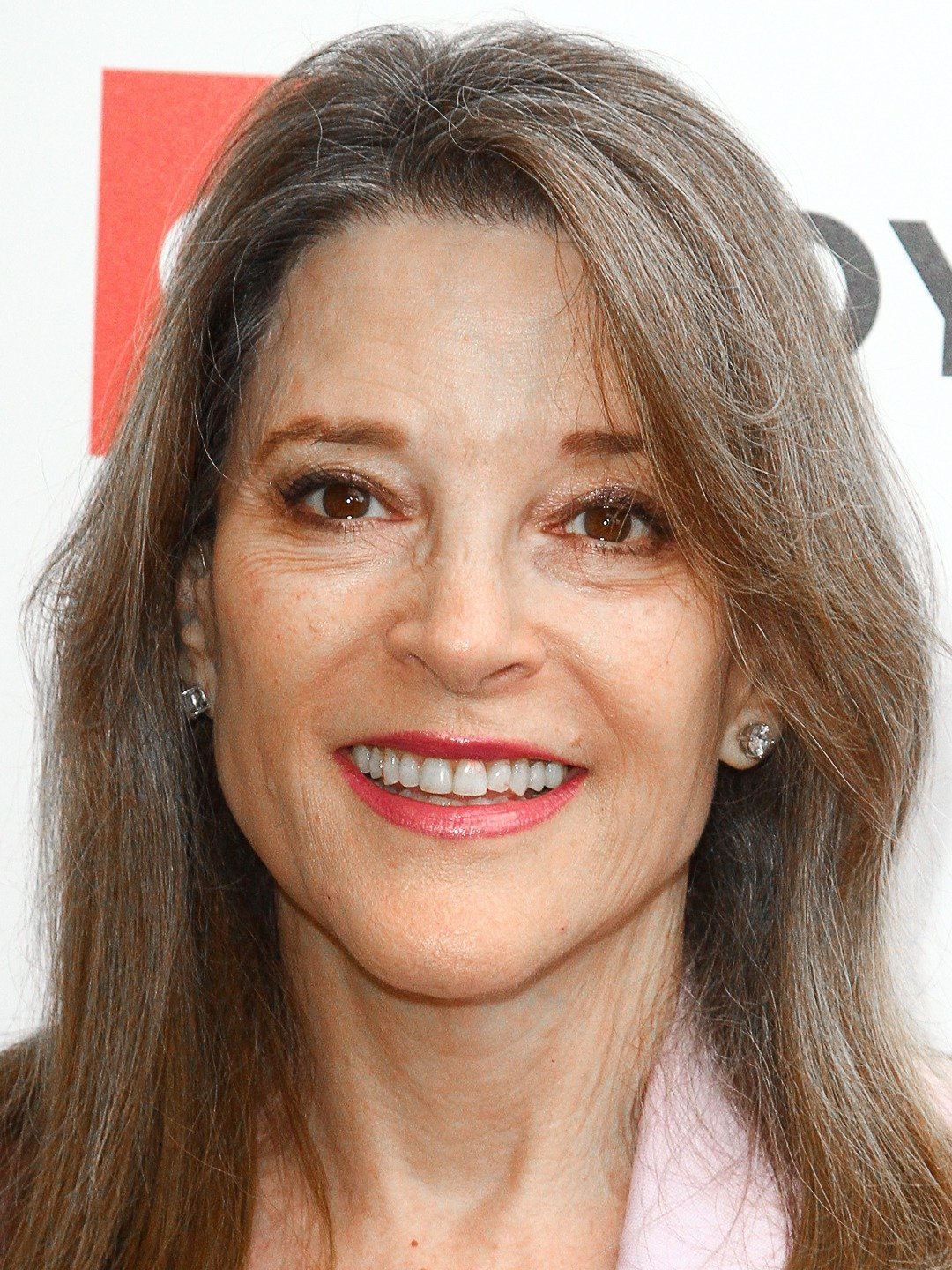

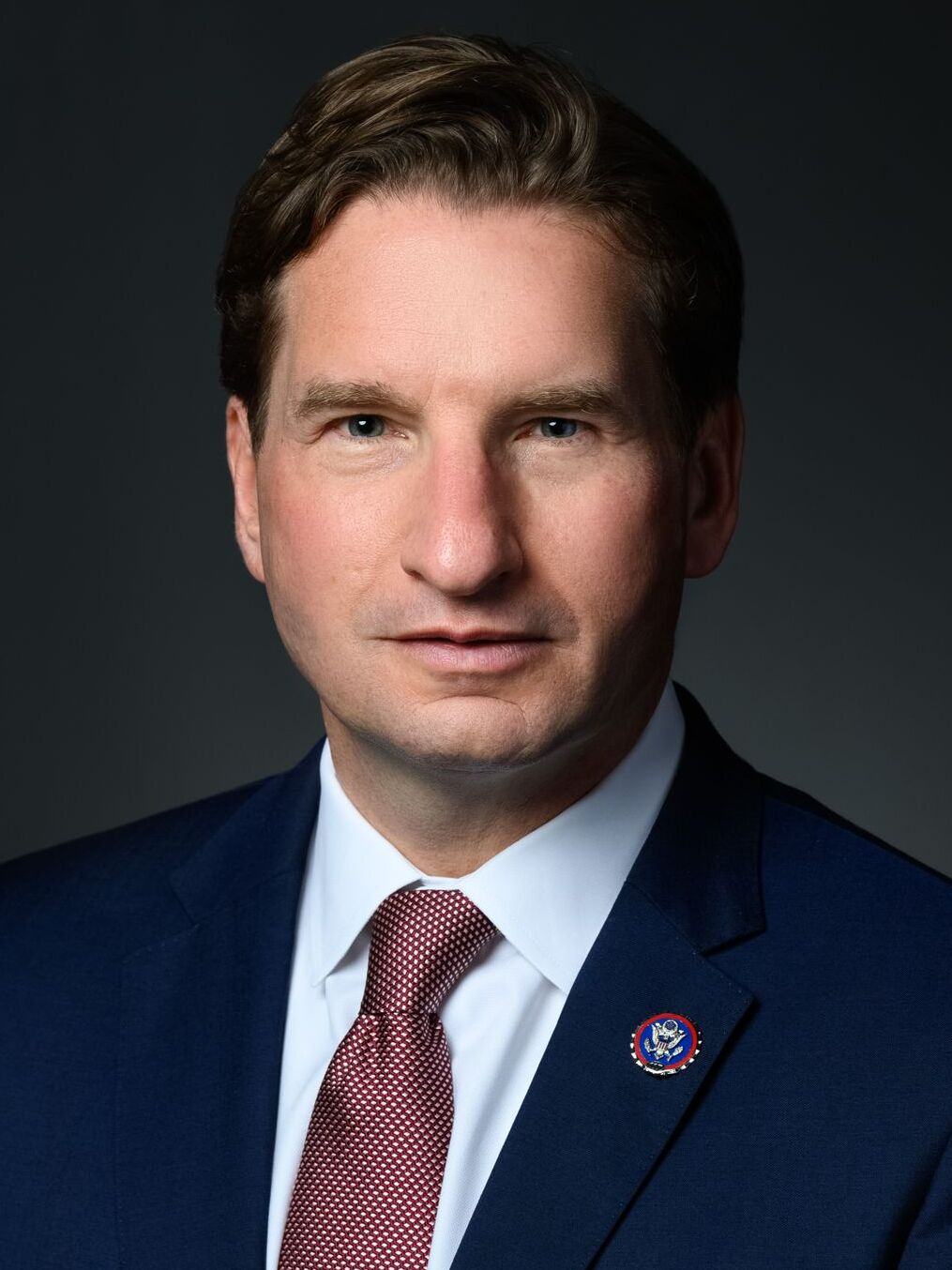
Candidate	Joe Biden	Marianne Williamson	Dean Phillips (withdrawn)
Home state	Delaware	Washington, D.C.	Minnesota
Delegate count	16	0	0
Popular vote	13,372	2,073	1,723
Percentage	74.6%	11.6%	9.6%
County results
Biden
30–40%
40–50%
50–60%
60–70%
70–80%
80–90%

The 2024 South Dakota Democratic presidential primary took place on June 4, 2024, one of the last states among four other primaries, as part of the Democratic Party primaries for the 2024 presidential election. 16 delegates to the Democratic National Convention were allocated, with 4 additional unpledged delegates.

Incumbent president Joe Biden initially ran for a second term and had already won most delegates. Biden won the primary and all delegates ahead of challengers Marianne Williamson and Dean Phillips.

== Candidates ==
Five candidates filed for the Democratic presidential primary ballot before the deadline:

- Joe Biden
- Gabriel Cornejo
- Armando Perez-Serrato
- Dean Phillips (withdrawn)
- Marianne Williamson

Cornejo had withdrawn from the ballot on March 18.

== Results ==
South Dakota Democratic primary, June 4, 2024
Candidate	Votes	%	Delegates
Joe Biden (incumbent)	13,372	74.57	16
Marianne Williamson	2,073	11.56	0
Dean Phillips (withdrawn)	1,723	9.61	0
Armando Perez-Serrato	763	4.26	0
Total	17,931	100%	16

== See also ==
- 2024 South Dakota Republican presidential primary
- 2024 Democratic Party presidential primaries
- 2024 United States presidential election
- 2024 United States presidential election in South Dakota
- 2024 United States elections
