= 2024 West Virginia Democratic presidential primary =

Presidential electoral process in West Virginia

- May 14, 2024

25 delegates (20 pledged, 5 unpledged) to the Democratic National Convention

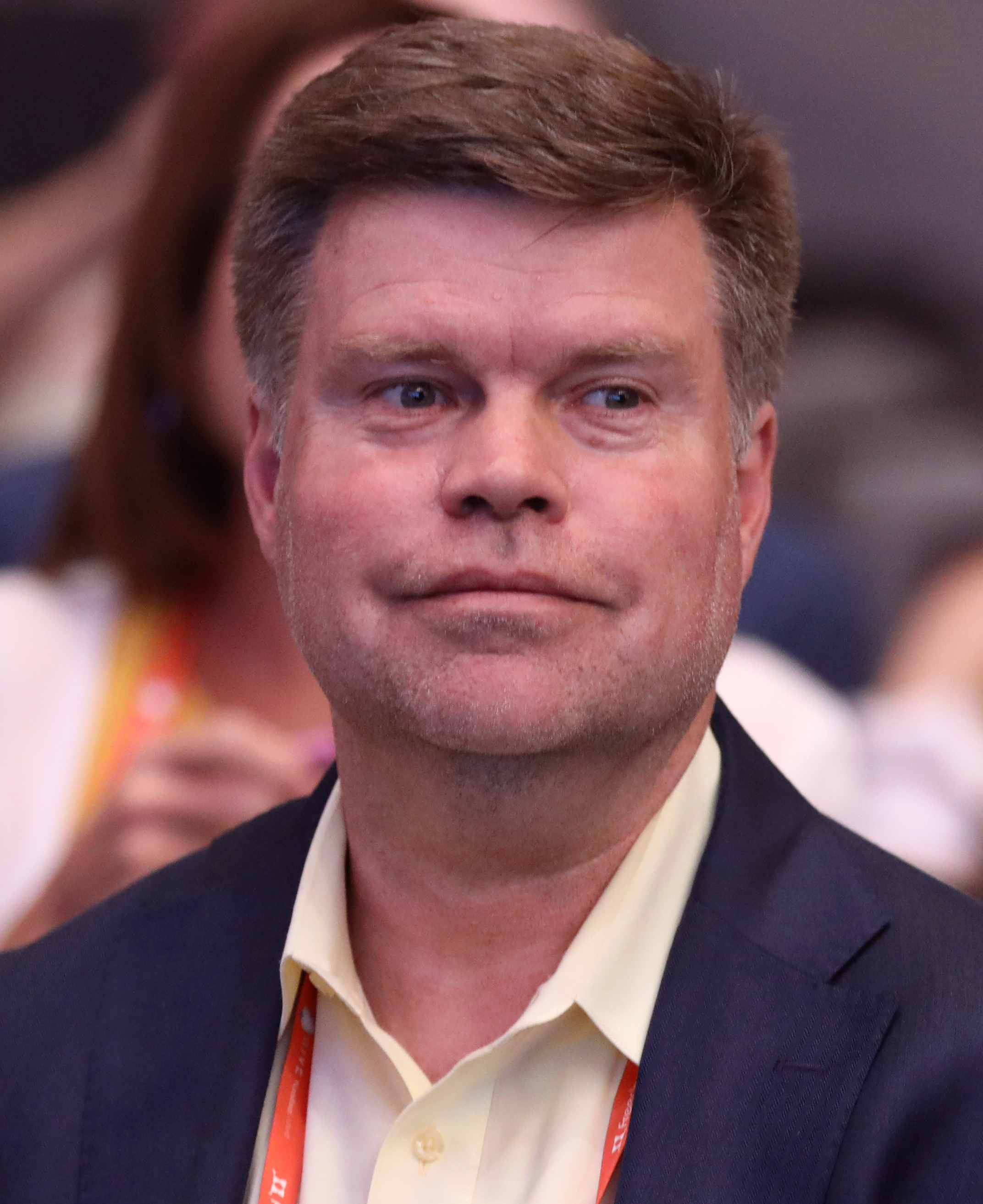

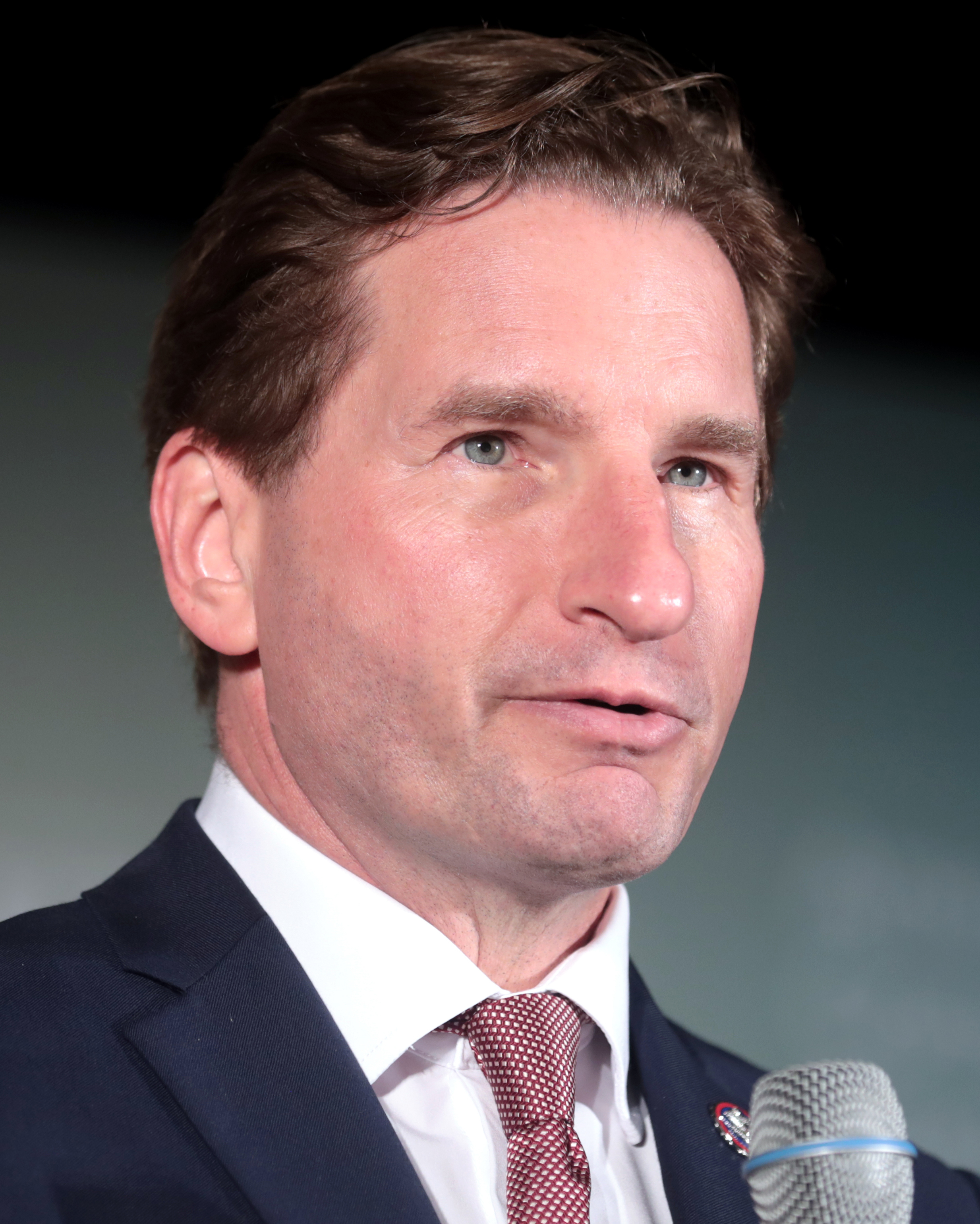
Candidate	Joe Biden	Jason Palmer
Home state	Delaware	Maryland
Delegate count	20	0
Popular vote	68,165	11,079
Percentage	70.5%	11.5%
Candidate	Stephen Lyons (withdrawn)	Dean Phillips (withdrawn)
Home state	Maryland	Minnesota
Delegate count	0	0
Popular vote	7,372	7,223
Percentage	7.6%	7.5%

Biden
40–50%
50–60%
60–70%
70–80%
80–90%

The 2024 West Virginia Democratic presidential primary took place on May 14, 2024, as part of the Democratic Party primaries for the 2024 presidential election, alongside two other state primaries. 20 delegates to the Democratic National Convention were allocated in a semi-closed primary, with 5 additional unpledged delegates.

While incumbent Joe Biden won with 70%, like in previous primaries voters in West Virginia significantly spread out between several challengers, including little-known East Coast investor Jason Palmer, virtually unknown individual Stephen Lyons, who wanted to advocate for the working class as former owner of a plumbing business, and US Representative Dean Phillips.

Even though Lyons and Phillips had previously withdrawn to endorse Palmer or Biden after Super Tuesday, the three challengers reached between 7 and 12% of votes. Although as they separated those votes all between them, Biden won the entire delegation.

== Candidates ==
The following candidates were certified to appear on the ballot in West Virginia:

- Joe Biden
- Stephen Lyons (withdrawn)
- Jason Palmer
- Armando Perez-Serrato
- Dean Phillips (withdrawn)

== Results ==
West Virginia Democratic primary, May 14, 2024
Candidate	Votes	%	Delegates
Joe Biden (incumbent)	68,165	70.55	20
Jason Palmer	11,079	11.47	0
Stephen Lyons (withdrawn)	7,372	7.63	0
Dean Phillips (withdrawn)	7,223	7.48	0
Armando Perez-Serrato	2,787	2.88	0
Total	96,626	100%	20

=== Results by congressional districts ===
Biden won both congressional districts. He performed slightly better in the second one, mimicking the Democrats' small overperformance there in the 2022 House election.

District	Biden	Palmer	Others	Representative
1st	69.5%	11.87%	18.65%	Carol Miller
2nd	71.7%	11.02%	17.28%	Alex Mooney

=== By county ===
Results without Biden

Biden secured his best result in Jefferson County; alongside Kanawha and Monongalia counties, it was one of the three counties where he earned more than 80% of the vote. Conversely, he fell below 50% in five counties, performing the worst in Wyoming County. It was also where Palmer recorded his best performance, at 24.2%. Neither Lyons nor Phillips crossed the 20% threshold, although Phillips came close to it in Logan County with 19.8%.

County	Biden	Palmer	Lyons	Phillips
Barbour	57.6%	17%	15.2%	7.3%
Berkeley	78.3%	7.2%	7.4%	4.6%
Boone	53.4%	16.4%	11.2%	13.3%
Braxton	59.4%	14.6%	9.7%	13.5%
Brooke	66.3%	14.5%	8.6%	7.3%
Cabell	78%	8.5%	5.7%	4.7%
Calhoun	57.9%	19.4%	8.5%	11.2%
Clay	47.7%	19.7%	10.5%	15%
Doddridge	64.6%	14.2%	8%	11.5%
Fayette	66.7%	9.4%	7.6%	12.8%
Gilmer	52.7%	21.9%	8.7%	13.6%
Grant	74.4%	9.5%	7.7%	6.5%
Greenbrier	75.8%	10.8%	3.7%	7.3%
Hampshire	63.5%	12.1%	12.1%	9.1%
Hancock	65.1%	11.3%	9.9%	10.9%
Hardy	63.3%	14.2%	9.2%	10.4%
Harrison	68.4%	11.8%	8.4%	7.5%
Jackson	68.4%	12.8%	9.6%	6.3%
Jefferson	86.1%	4.7%	4.4%	3.2%
Kanawha	80.8%	6.6%	5.8%	4.4%
Lewis	57.9%	15.9%	10.7%	13.6%
Lincoln	55.5%	14.3%	11.8%	16.2%
Logan	51.8%	15.7%	8.4%	19.8%
Marion	67.2%	11.3%	10.4%	8.4%
Marshall	65.2%	17.2%	7.5%	7.2%
Mason	59.8%	20.3%	8.3%	8%
McDowell	57.6%	14.1%	9.1%	14.5%
Mercer	68.1%	13.4%	8.8%	6.8%
Mineral	66.8%	10%	15.4%	5.8%
Mingo	49.2%	23.8%	7.8%	14.4%
Monongalia	80.8%	8.7%	5%	3.3%
Monroe	71.5%	10.1%	9.7%	6.6%
Morgan	71.5%	10.1%	9.7%	6.6%
Nicholas	62.2%	17.6%	11.2%	7%
Ohio	77.3%	10.7%	2.9%	6.8%
Pendleton	66.5%	11.3%	10.5%	9.1%
Pleasants	65.1%	17.3%	9.3%	5.8%
Pocahontas	66.4%	12.5%	9.2%	10.1%
Preston	64.7%	14.3%	10.8%	7.1%
Putnam	77%	7%	7.2%	7%
Raleigh	67.9%	13.9%	6.7%	7.9%
Randolph	61.8%	13.8%	9.4%	12.3%
Ritchie	63.3%	17.4%	9.2%	7.8%
Roane	70.3%	16%	4.5%	5.2%
Summers	66.5%	15.4%	8.2%	7%
Taylor	67.5%	16.8%	7.9%	6.3%
Tucker	64.4%	10.4%	15.3%	8%
Tyler	57.4%	18.7%	8.6%	13.4%
Upshur	68.7%	9.5%	12%	6.7%
Wayne	59.1%	18.5%	8.6%	10.3%
Webster	49.9%	18.9%	9.4%	17.5%
Wetzel	57.8%	16.3%	9.2%	12.8%
Wirt	48.4%	14.6%	17.5%	18.7%
Wood	72.5%	11.6%	6.9%	6.1%
Wyoming	44.8%	24.2%	11.8%	14.8%

== See also ==
- 2024 West Virginia Republican presidential primary
- 2024 Democratic Party presidential primaries
- 2024 United States presidential election
- 2024 United States presidential election in West Virginia
- 2024 United States elections
