= 2024 Arizona Democratic presidential primary =

- March 19, 2024

85 delegates (72 pledged, 13 unpledged) to the Democratic National Convention

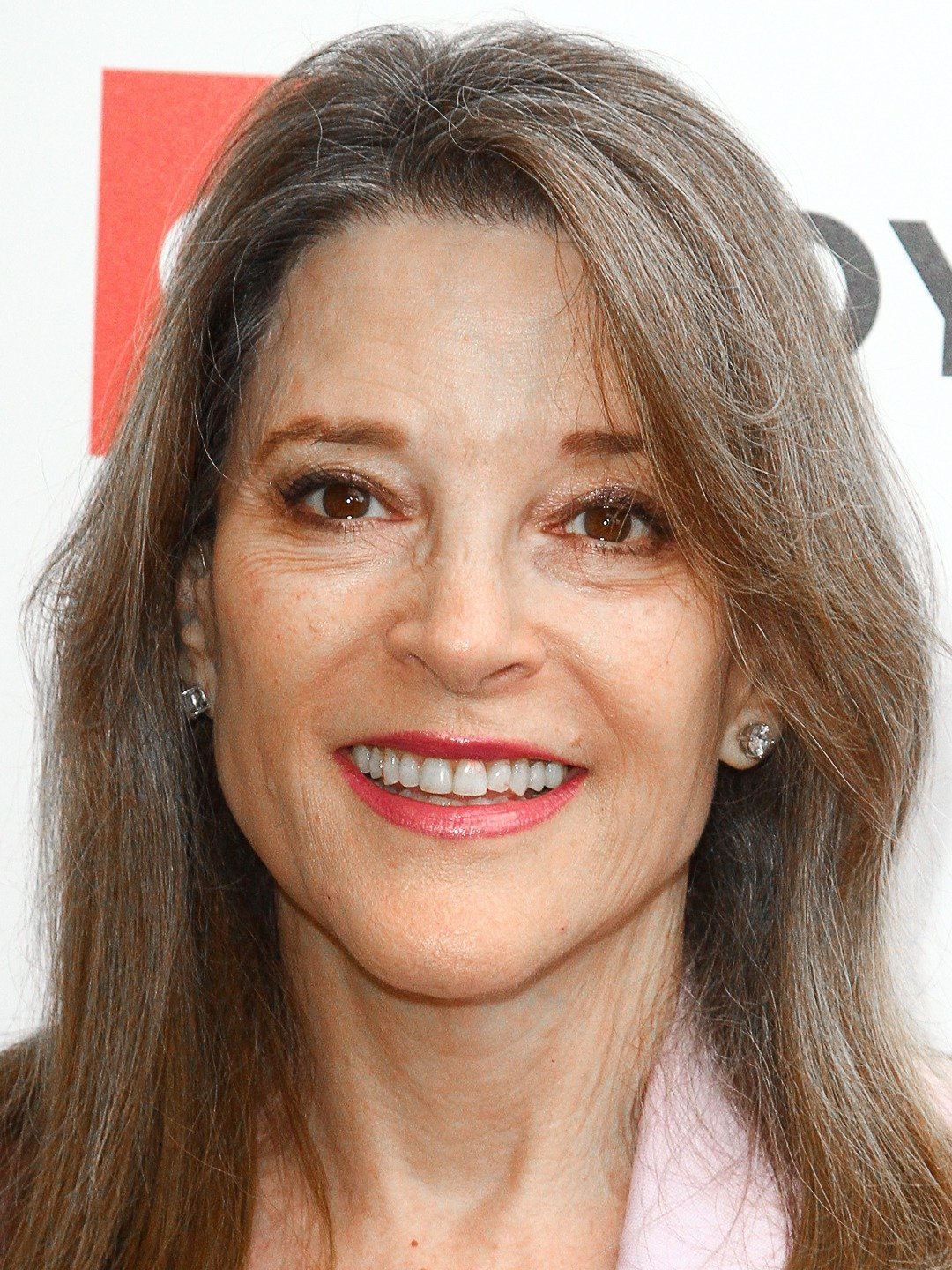
| Candidate | Joe Biden | Marianne Williamson |
| Home state | Delaware | Washington, D.C. |
| Delegate count | 72 | 0 |
| Popular vote | 375,110 | 15,844 |
| Percentage | 89.3% | 3.8% |
County results
Biden
70 – 80%
80 – 90%
>90%

The 2024 Arizona Democratic presidential primary was held on March 19, 2024, as part of the Democratic Party primaries for the 2024 presidential election, alongside three other states. 72 delegates to the Democratic National Convention were allocated, with 13 additional delegates. The closed primary was held alongside the primaries of Illinois, Kansas and Ohio.

President Joe Biden won all delegates in a landslide, with Marianne Williamson, Dean Phillips, Jason Palmer and three lesser-known candidates also on the ballot.

== Candidates ==
The following candidates filed until December 11, 2023:

- Joe Biden
- Gabriel Cornejo (withdrawn)
- Frankie Lozada (withdrawn)
- Stephen Lyons (withdrawn)
- Jason Palmer
- Dean Phillips (withdrawn)
- Marianne Williamson

Phillips had withdrawn after Super Tuesday, while Cornejo, Lozada and Lyons withdrew two weeks later following subsequent contests because they endorsed Palmer after his win in American Samoa.

== Endorsements ==
Joe Biden

US Senators

- Mark Kelly, U.S. Senator from Arizona (2020–present)

US Representatives

- Ruben Gallego, U.S. Representative from AZ-03 (2023–present) and AZ-07 (2017–2023), candidate for U.S. Senator from Arizona in 2024
- Gabby Giffords, U.S. Representative from AZ-08 (2007–2012), wife of U.S. Senator Mark Kelly

Local officials

- Kate Gallego, 62nd Mayor of Phoenix, Arizona (2019–present)

Organizations

- Democratic Party of Arizona

== Results ==
2024 Arizona Democratic pres. primary
| Candidate | Votes | % | Delegates |
|---|---|---|---|
| Joe Biden (incumbent) | 375,110 | 89.27 | 72 |
| Marianne Williamson | 15,844 | 3.77 | 0 |
| Dean Phillips (withdrawn) | 11,611 | 2.76 | 0 |
| Gabriel Cornejo (withdrawn) | 6,128 | 1.46 | 0 |
| Frankie Lozada (withdrawn) | 4,976 | 1.18 | 0 |
| Jason Palmer | 3,752 | 0.89 | 0 |
| Stephen Lyons (withdrawn) | 2,753 | 0.66 | 0 |
| Total | 420,174 | 100% | 72 |

== Polling ==
| Poll source | Date(s) administered | Sample size (Note: Key: A – all adults RV – registered voters LV – likely voters V – unclear) | Margin of error | Joe Biden | Robert F. Kennedy Jr. | Marianne Williamson | Undecided |
|---|---|---|---|---|---|---|---|
| | March 6, 2024 | Phillips suspends his candidacy | | | | | |
| | February 28, 2024 | Williamson re-launches her candidacy | | | | | |
| | February 7, 2024 | Williamson suspends her candidacy | | | | | |
| | October 27, 2023 | Phillips announces his candidacy | | | | | |
| | October 9, 2023 | Kennedy withdraws from the Primaries | | | | | |
| Emerson College | August 2–4, 2023 | 516 (LV) | ± 2.6% | 65% | 10% | 2% | 21% |

== See also ==
- 2024 Arizona Republican presidential primary
- 2024 Democratic Party presidential primaries
- 2024 United States presidential election
- 2024 United States presidential election in Arizona
- 2024 United States elections

== Notes ==
Partisan clients
