= 2024 Ohio Democratic presidential primary =

- March 19, 2024

144 delegates (127 pledged, 17 unpledged) to the Democratic National Convention

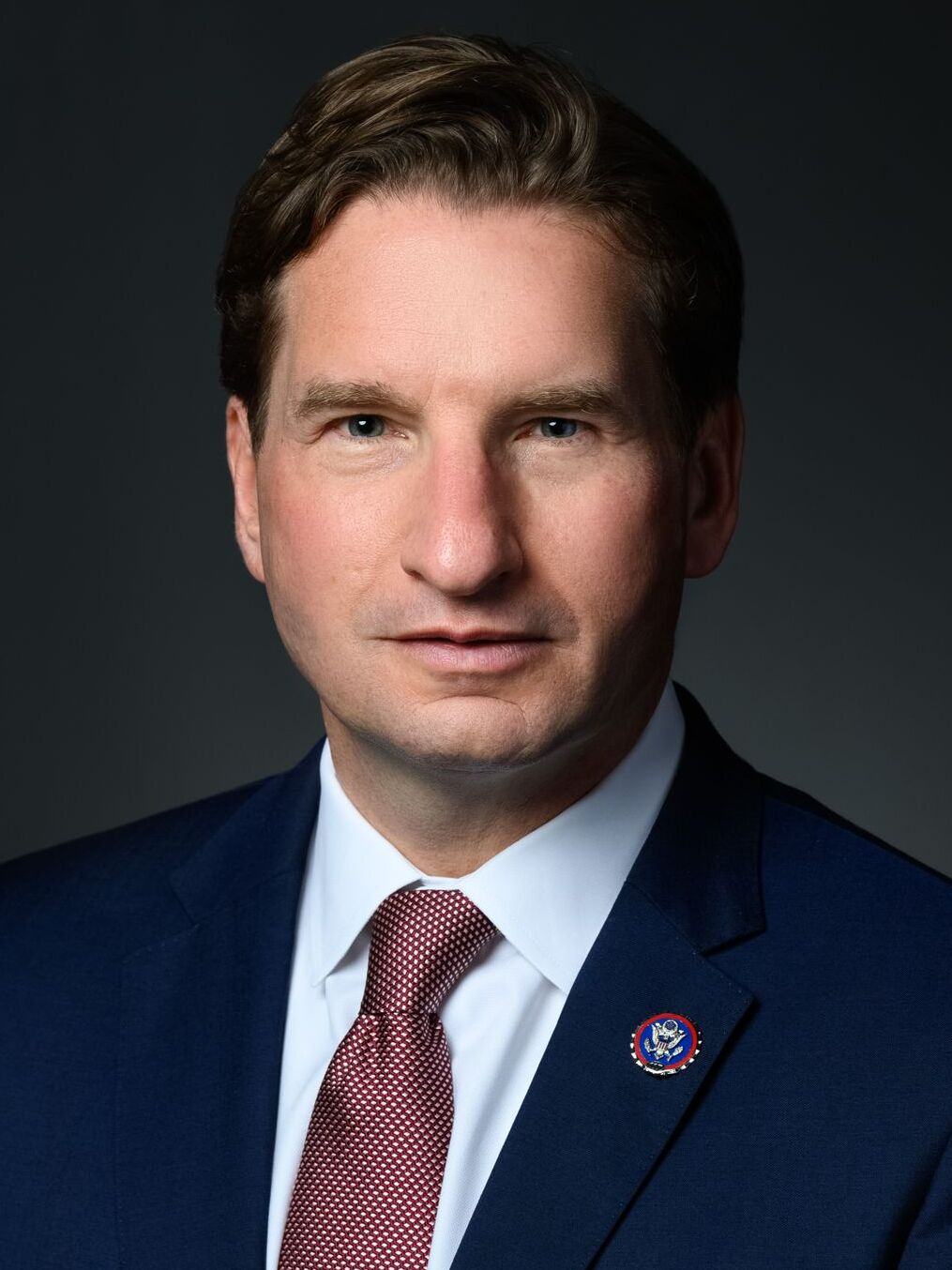
Candidate	Joe Biden	Dean Phillips (withdrawn)
Home state	Delaware	Minnesota
Delegate count	124	3
Popular vote	461,558	68,629
Percentage	87.1%	12.9%
County results
Biden
60 – 70%
70 – 80%
80 – 90%
>90%

The 2024 Ohio Democratic presidential primary took place on March 19, 2024, as part of the Democratic Party primaries for the 2024 presidential election, alongside three other states. 127 delegates to the Democratic National Convention were allocated through a semi-closed primary, with 17 additional unpledged delegates. The contest was held alongside the primaries of Arizona, Illinois, and Kansas.

President Joe Biden won every county; but, despite having already dropped out, the only other candidate U.S. Representative Dean Phillips was still on the ballot on election day and won three delegates. He met the 15% threshold needed to receive a district delegate in the state's 2nd, 6th, and 14th districts, which the party and media were able to calculate roughly a month later in late April.

== Candidates ==
The filing deadline for the Ohio primary was on December 20, 2023, and the office of the Secretary of State of Ohio published the list of certified candidates on January 9, 2024.

- Joe Biden
- Dean Phillips (withdrawn)

== Endorsements ==
Joe Biden

U.S. Senator

- Sherrod Brown, U.S. Senator from Ohio (2007–present), U.S. Representative from OH-13 (1993–2007)

U.S. Representatives

- Joyce Beatty, U.S. Representative from OH-03 (2013–present)
- Shontel Brown, U.S. Representative from OH-11 (2021–present)
- Marcy Kaptur, U.S. Representative from OH-09 (1983–present)

Mayors

- Aftab Pureval, 70th Mayor of Cincinnati (2022–present)
- Nan Whaley, 56th Mayor of Dayton (2014–2022), nominee for Governor of Ohio in 2022

Organizations

- Ohio Democratic Party

== Results ==
2024 Ohio Democratic pres. primary
Candidate	Votes	%	Delegates
Joe Biden (incumbent)	461,558	87.06	124
Dean Phillips (withdrawn)	68,629	12.94	3
Total	530,187	100%	127

== Polling ==
Poll source	Date(s) administered	Sample size (Note: Key: A – all adults RV – registered voters LV – likely voters V – unclear)	Margin of error	Joe Biden	Robert F. Kennedy Jr.	Dean Phillips	Marianne Williamson	Other / Undecided
	March 6, 2024	Phillips suspends his candidacy						
	February 7, 2024	Williamson suspends her campaign						
Emerson College	Nov 10–13, 2023	351 (LV)	± 3.0%	61%	–	2%	7%	30%
	October 27, 2023	Phillips announces his campaign						
Ohio Northern University	Oct 16–19, 2023	256 (LV)	± 3.8%	62%	–	–	6%	32% (Note: Gavin Newsom with 7%; Cornel West with 2%)
	October 9, 2023	Kennedy withdraws from the primaries						
Ohio Northern University	Jul 17–26, 2023	– (LV)	–	60%	15%	–	3%	22% (Note: Gavin Newsom with 6%; Cornel West with 2%)
Suffolk University	Jul 9–12, 2023	152 (RV)	–	67%	13%	–	3%	17%

== See also ==
- 2024 Ohio Republican presidential primary
- 2024 Democratic Party presidential primaries
- 2024 United States presidential election in Ohio
