= Timeline of the 2024 United States presidential election =

- November 5, 2024

This is a timeline of major events leading up to, during, and after the 2024 United States presidential election, which was the first presidential election to be run with population data from the 2020 census. In addition to the dates mandated by the relevant federal laws such as those in the U.S. Constitution and the Electoral Count Act, several milestones have consistently been observed since the adoption of the conclusions of the 1971 McGovern–Fraser Commission.

Republican Party ticket

Former President Donald Trump

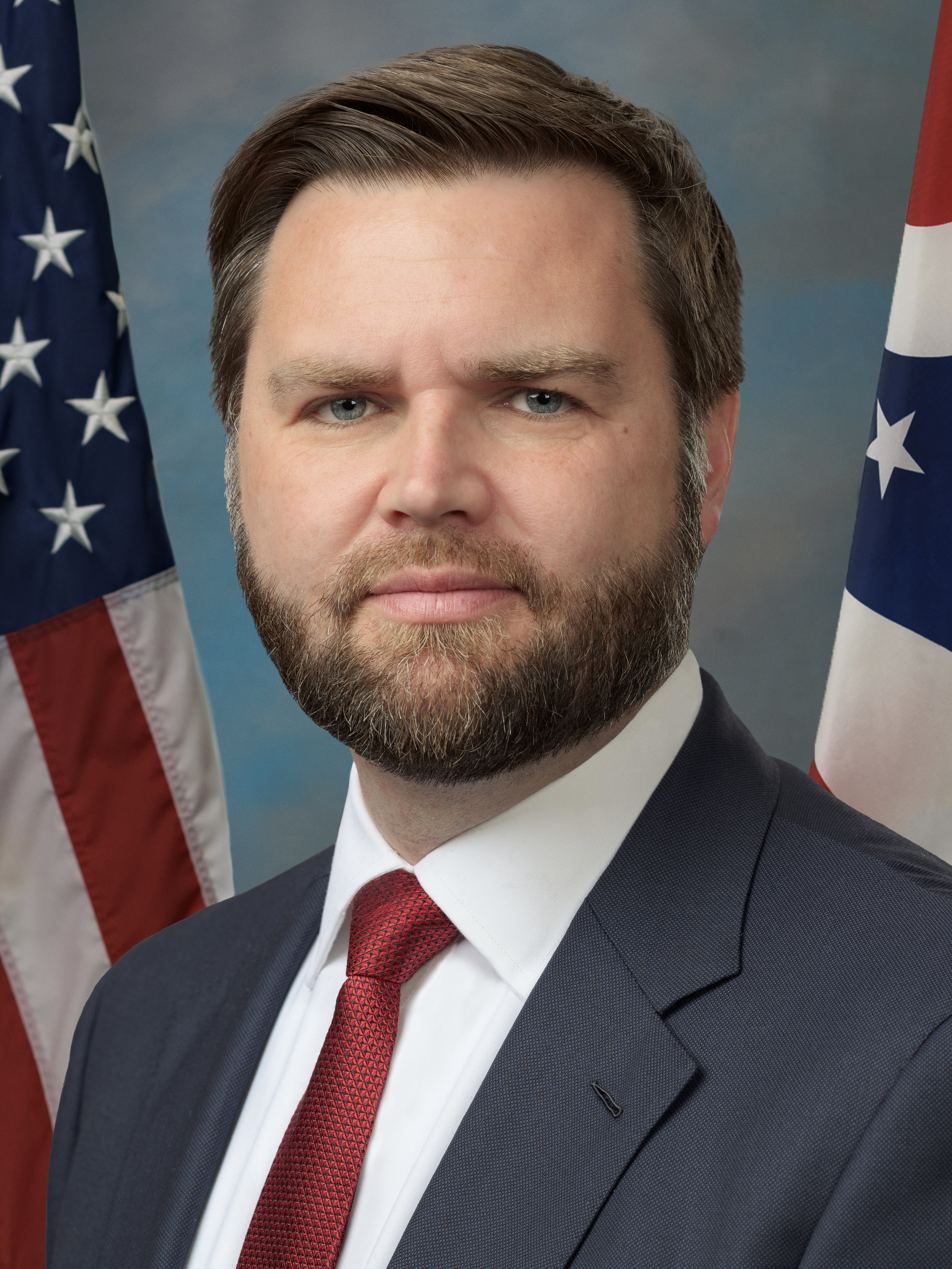
Senator JD Vance

Democratic Party ticket

Vice President Kamala Harris

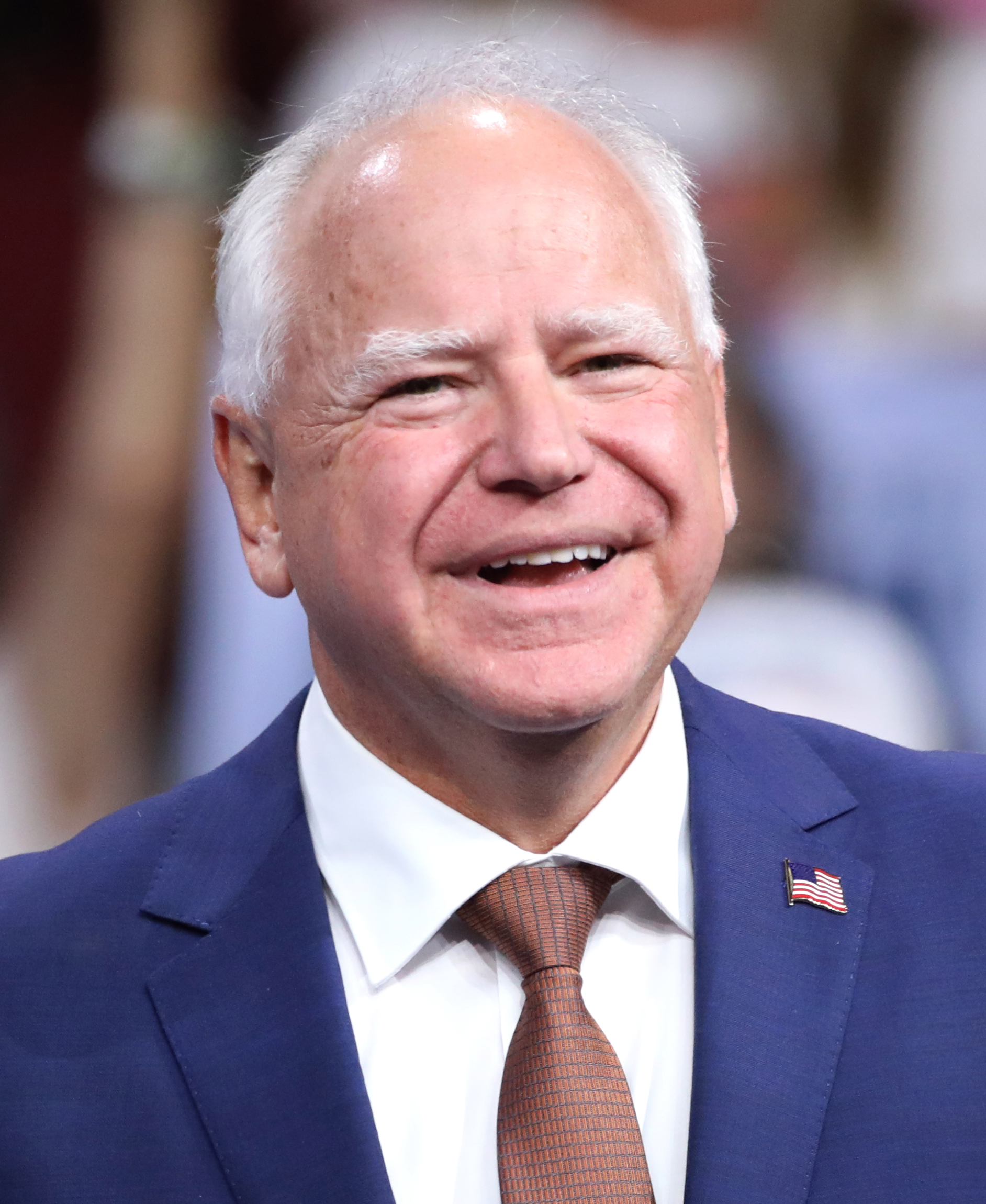
Governor Tim Walz

== 2020 ==
- November 7: Joe Biden is declared the winner of the 2020 presidential election by a consensus of major news outlets projecting the results, defeating incumbent President Donald Trump.
- December 18: The U.S. Supreme Court delivers its per curiam decision in Trump v. New York regarding the 2020 United States census, effectively allowing Trump's July 2020 presidential memorandum to stand, which ordered the Department of Commerce exclude the estimated counts of illegal immigrants. The per curiam decision vacated the U.S. District Court's previous ruling on the basis that the case was premature due to lack of standing and ripeness. Justice Stephen Breyer files a dissent, which was joined by Justices Sonia Sotomayor and Elena Kagan, arguing that the Court should have considered the case.
- December 31: The U.S. Census Bureau misses the deadline to deliver the 2020 census results and the new apportionment counts to outgoing President Donald Trump.

== 2021 ==
- January 6: United States Capitol attack: Trump supporters attack and storm the Capitol building in an attempt to stop the counting of the electoral votes.
- January 13: President Trump is impeached for a second time in relation to the events that took place the week prior.
- January 20: Joe Biden is inaugurated as the 46th president of the United States, along with Kamala Harris as the 49th vice president.
- February 13: Trump is acquitted by the Senate, maintaining his eligibility for a non-consecutive re-election bid.
- April 26: The apportionment figures of the 2020 census are released, determining the distribution of electoral votes for the 2024 and 2028 elections.
- June 26: Trump begins a series of campaign-style rallies.
- November 20: President Biden and some of his aides inform some allies that he plans to run again in 2024.

== 2022 ==
- January 19: President Biden commits to keeping Vice President Kamala Harris as his running mate in 2024.
- February 27: Former President Donald Trump wins the 2022 CPAC straw poll by over 30 points.
- March 8: Former secretary of state Hillary Clinton declares she will not run again in 2024.
- March 10: Corey Stapleton, former secretary of state of Montana, announces he has formed a formal exploratory committee for a possible run for president.
- March 16: Donald Trump announces that if he runs for re-election, his former Vice President Mike Pence will not be his running mate.
- April 9: U.S. intelligence officials suggest that Russian President Vladimir Putin may launch another campaign to interfere in the presidential election, similar to in 2016 and 2020.
- April 14: The RNC votes unanimously to withdraw from the Commission on Presidential Debates.
- April 15: RNC endorses prioritizing Iowa and New Hampshire's "first-in-the-nation" status.
- June 24: In Dobbs v. Jackson Women's Health Organization, the Supreme Court of the United States declares that the Constitution does not confer the right to an abortion. The decision is met with controversy as abortion becomes a hot button issue across the country.
- July 6: Russian propagandist Olga Skabeyeva suggested that Russia could work to reinstate Trump as president in 2024.
- July 14: In an interview with Olivia Nuzzi of Intelligencer, Trump states that he had already decided to run again, and is weighing whether to declare "before or after" the midterms.
- July 29: US Representative Dean Phillips becomes the first incumbent elected official from the Democratic Party in Congress to say Biden shouldn't run for president in 2024.
- August 5: The RNC names Milwaukee as the site for the 2024 Republican National Convention.
- August 8: The FBI executes a search warrant at Mar-a-Lago relating to a criminal investigation into former President Trump.
- August 19: Philosopher and perennial candidate Jerome Segal announces his presidential campaign, becoming the first confirmed candidate for the 2024 Democratic primaries.
- November 8: Midterm elections: The Democratic Party retains control of the U.S. Senate, flipping one seat in Pennsylvania, while the Republican Party gains control of the U.S. House of Representatives with a net gain of nine seats, restoring the majority they had lost in the 2018 elections.
- November 11: Former Montana Secretary of State Corey Stapleton declares his intent to run for president in 2024 as a Republican, becoming the first confirmed candidate for the 2024 Republican primaries.
- November 15: Former president Donald Trump announces his candidacy at a rally in front of his Mar-a-Lago resort in Palm Beach, Florida.
- November 18: U.S. Attorney General Merrick Garland opens an investigation into former President Trump's role in the U.S. Capitol attack and his handling of government documents, headed by special counsel Jack Smith.
- November 18–22: The Republican Jewish Coalition conference, which is considered the first major "cattle call" event of the cycle, takes place in Las Vegas, Nevada.
- November 20:
  - Former South Carolina Governor and ambassador to the UN Nikki Haley announced she's considering running for president.
  - Rapper and 2020 candidate Kanye West informally confirms his 2024 campaign when answering paparazzi questions.
- November 22: Kanye West meets with Donald Trump at Mar-a-Lago, along with Nick Fuentes, in which West allegedly offered Trump to be his running mate.
- December 1–3: The DNC's rules and bylaws committee meets to finalize the primary schedule for the upcoming cycle.
- December 15: Based on Trump's involvement in the January 6 Capitol attack, Congressman David Cicilline introduces a bill that would prevent Trump from running for public office again under Section 3 of the Fourteenth Amendment, which disqualifies presidential candidates who have engaged in insurrection against the United States.
- December 29: President Biden signs the Electoral Count Reform and Presidential Transition Improvement Act, adding to and revising the procedures carried out for the counting of electoral votes and the presidential transition process.

== 2023 ==
=== January 2023 ===
- January 6: John Anthony Castro, a minor presidential candidate, files a federal lawsuit against Donald Trump claiming the ineligibility of his candidacy.
- January 26: The Michigan Legislature passes a bill that moves the state's presidential primary date to February, which violates Republican Party rules and may disqualify its delegates.

=== February 2023 ===
- February 4: The Democratic National Committee approves a new primary calendar, moving South Carolina to February 3, followed by Nevada and New Hampshire on February 6, Georgia on February 13, and Michigan on February 27. Iowa, which traditionally goes first, would then be held later in the primary season. The DNC gives Georgia and New Hampshire an extended deadline of June to modify their state laws so they can comply with the new dates (New Hampshire state law mandates them to hold the first primary in the country, while Georgia state law requires them to hold both the Democratic and Republican primaries on the same day), but this remains unlikely to happen since both states have Republican-controlled state legislatures.
- February 14: Former UN ambassador and South Carolina Governor Nikki Haley announces her bid for the Republican presidential nomination.
- February 21: Author and businessman Vivek Ramaswamy announces his candidacy for the Republican presidential nomination.

=== March 2023 ===
- March 1–4: The 2023 Conservative Political Action Conference is held in National Harbor, Maryland, with candidates Trump, Haley, and Ramaswamy all featured as speakers.
- March 2: Businessman Perry Johnson announces his campaign outside of CPAC after spending his own money on Super Bowl commercials promoting his candidacy the month prior.
- March 3: The DNC declares their full support for President Biden's re-election, stating they do not plan to host any official debates.
- March 4:
  - Author Marianne Williamson announces her campaign for the Democratic presidential nomination as the first major primary challenger to incumbent President Biden.
  - Trump wins the 2023 CPAC straw poll, leading prospective candidate Ron DeSantis by 42 points.
- March 5: Former governor of Maryland Larry Hogan declares he will not run for the Republican presidential nomination in 2024.
- March 6: According to sources close to Donald Trump, Axios reports a shortlist of potential contenders for his running mate, including former UN ambassador Nikki Haley, former news anchor Kari Lake, South Dakota governor Kristi Noem, and Arkansas governor Sarah Huckabee Sanders.
- March 16: 2016 independent presidential candidate Joe Exotic announced he is running for president from federal prison.
- March 18: The Palmetto Family Council's Vision '24 Forum is held in Charleston, South Carolina, with Haley and potential candidate Tim Scott in attendance.
- March 30: Former President Donald Trump is indicted by a Manhattan grand jury for his hush money scandal with Stormy Daniels.

=== April 2023 ===
- April 2:
  - Former governor of Arkansas Asa Hutchinson informally announced his candidacy during an exclusive interview with ABC News' Jonathan Karl.
  - No Labels, a centrist political organization advocating for bipartisanship, began exploring options to support a unity ticket in the presidential election.
- April 4: Former President Donald Trump turns himself in and pleads not guilty to all 34 felony charges in New York.
- April 5: Activist Chase Oliver, former chair of the Atlanta Libertarian Party, announces his campaign for the Libertarian presidential primaries.
- April 6:
  - Robert F. Kennedy Jr. files to challenge Biden in the 2024 Democratic primary.
  - The Idaho Legislature passes House Bill 138, moving the state's presidential primary date to May while also eliminating the original primary date in March.
- April 11: The Democratic Party announces that its convention will be held in Chicago, Illinois.
- April 12: U.S. senator of South Carolina, Tim Scott, announces the formation of an exploratory committee to possibly run for president.
- April 14:
  - Former U.S. Secretary of State Mike Pompeo declines to run for the Republican presidential nomination.
  - The Daily Beast reports that Kanye West's campaign has been stagnant for months following infighting between staffers and West's general disinterest.
- April 14–15: The National Rifle Association of America holds its 2023 Annual Meeting and Exhibit in Indianapolis, with a number of presidential hopefuls in attendance.
- April 19: Robert F. Kennedy Jr., environmental lawyer and son of Robert F. Kennedy, formally announces his presidential campaign in a launch event in Boston.
- April 20: Larry Elder, radio host, attorney, and candidate in the 2021 California gubernatorial recall election, formally announces his presidential campaign during an interview on Tucker Carlson Tonight.
- April 23: The Iowa Faith and Freedom Coalition annual spring kick-off is held in Clive, Iowa, and is attended by numerous current and prospective Republican presidential candidates.
- April 25:
  - Incumbent Democratic President Joe Biden announces his bid for re-election in 2024.
  - Trump raises uncertainty about his participation in primary debates on Truth Social, saying he did not want to subject himself to "being libeled and abused."
- April 26: Asa Hutchinson formally announces his candidacy during a campaign rally in Bentonville, Arkansas.

=== May 2023 ===
- May 3: Forbes reports that the Ramaswamy campaign paid an editor to alter his Wikipedia page, removing his connections to George Soros.
- May 4: Georgia Secretary of State Brad Raffensperger schedules the Georgia Democratic primary for March 12, denying the DNC's request for a separate February 13 date.
- May 6: Jerome Segal suspends his presidential campaign to instead run for U.S. Senator from Maryland.
- May 9: Trump is found liable for sexually abusing and defaming author E. Jean Carroll and is ordered to pay $5 million in damages.
- May 10: CNN hosts a live town hall with Donald Trump, his first time with a major network other than Fox News since October 2020.
- May 19: U.S. Senator Tim Scott files paperwork to run for president.
- May 22: Tim Scott officially launches his presidential campaign with a rally at his alma mater, Charleston Southern University.
- May 24: After months of speculation, Florida Governor Ron DeSantis launches his presidential campaign in an interview with Elon Musk over Twitter Spaces.
- May 31: The Nevada Republican Party files a lawsuit against the Secretary of State of Nevada for changing the Nevada presidential nominating contests from a caucus to a primary.

=== June 2023 ===
- June 2: The RNC sets rules for their first presidential debate, requiring candidates to attract 40,000 unique donors with a polling threshold of 1%.
- June 3:
  - Republican candidates attend U.S. Senator Joni Ernst's Roast and Ride fundraising event in Des Moines, Iowa.
  - The American Solidarity Party nominates Peter Sonski, a school board member from Connecticut, as their presidential nominee for the 2024 election.
- June 4: Robert F. Kennedy Jr.'s Instagram account is reinstated after it was suspended in February 2021 for sharing misinformation about the COVID-19 vaccine.
- June 5:
  - Former Vice President Mike Pence, who served under Trump, files paperwork to run for president.
  - New Hampshire Governor Chris Sununu declares he will not run for the Republican presidential nomination in 2024, having previously expressed possible interest in doing so.
  - Philosopher Cornel West announces he is running for president as the candidate of the People's Party.
- June 6: Former New Jersey Governor and 2016 candidate Chris Christie announces he is running for president at a town hall in Saint Anselm College.
- June 7:
  - Mike Pence formally announces his presidential campaign in a kickoff event in Ankeny, Iowa, on his 64th birthday.
  - North Dakota Governor Doug Burgum announces his presidential campaign with a rally in Fargo, becoming the first born in his state to run for president.
- June 8: Former President Donald Trump is indicted a second time on charges stemming from the Smith special counsel investigation.
- June 10: The Michigan Republican Party approves a plan to award a majority of delegates based on district-level caucus meetings in March, held after the primary in February.
- June 11: A Suffolk University poll finds that 8 in 10 Democratic voters would like to see Biden debate other Democratic primary candidates.
- June 13: Former President Donald Trump turns himself in and pleads not guilty to all 37 felony counts at a federal district court in Miami.
- June 14:
  - Cornel West announces his intention to seek the Green Party's nomination to build a "coalition strategy."
  - Miami Mayor Francis Suarez files to run for president with the Federal Election Commission.
- June 15:
  - Francis Suarez makes an official announcement for his presidential run at the Ronald Reagan Presidential Library.
  - In an interview on The Joe Rogan Experience, Kennedy raises the belief that he could be assassinated by the Central Intelligence Agency.
  - No Labels stated they will not run a third-party candidate if Biden is polling "way ahead" of Trump by spring, insisting they do not want to risk spoiling the election in favor of Trump.
- June 17: President Joe Biden begins his campaign at a rally in Philadelphia.
- June 20: In an interview with Bret Baier, Trump states that he has not committed to participating in the first primary debate.
- June 22: Former U.S. Representative Will Hurd announces his presidential campaign.
- June 22–24: The Faith and Freedom Coalition holds a policy conference in Washington, D.C., with every major Republican candidate besides Burgum in attendance.
- June 23: Will Hurd says he will not sign the RNC pledge to back the eventual nominee, disqualifying himself from the primary debates.
- June 26: The Idaho Republican Party votes to approve a March presidential caucus for their presidential nomination process.
- June 29: Pence visits Ukraine and meets with President Volodymyr Zelenskyy, distinguishing himself from his other Republican presidential rivals.
- June 30 – July 1: Moms for Liberty holds its Joyful Warriors National Summit in downtown Philadelphia.

=== July 2023 ===
- July 6: The Republican Party of Florida announces a requirement for candidates to pledge support for the eventual nominee in order to appear on the state primary ballot.
- July 7: DeSantis declares that he will participate in the first primary debate whether or not Trump chooses to attend.
- July 8: The Republican Party of Iowa determines the date for its presidential caucuses for January 15, the earliest caucus date since 2012.
- July 10: Doug Burgum's campaign begins offering $20 gift cards to supporters who donate at least $1 as a tactic to qualify for the debates.
- July 12: Morning Consult releases the first debate-qualifying poll, with eight candidates surpassing the one percent threshold.
- July 13: A Nevada District Court rules against the state GOP's request to block the state-run primary. Nevada Republicans indicate they will boycott the primary and hold their own caucus at a later date.
- July 14: The Family Leader holds its leadership summit in Des Moines, Iowa. President Biden and Robert Kennedy were invited, but declined to attend.
- July 15: The DeSantis campaign lays off a number of staffers amid struggles with fundraising, according to a report from an internal source.
- July 15–16: Turning Point Action hosts its conference at the Palm Beach County Convention Center in Florida, with various candidates, including Trump, attending the event.
- July 16:
  - DeSantis states that he would consider Iowa Governor Kim Reynolds as his running mate if he wins the nomination.
  - Trump wins the Turning Point Action Conference straw poll with 86% support. In the vice presidential poll, Kari Lake won 30%, with Byron Donalds at 24% and Ramaswamy at 22%.
- July 25: DeSantis and members of his staff are involved in a car accident outside of Chattanooga, Tennessee; the governor is unhurt and one staffer receives minor injuries.
- July 28: Republican candidates attend the GOP Lincoln Dinner hosted by the Republican Party of Iowa in Des Moines.

=== August 2023 ===
- August 1: Former President Donald Trump is indicted a third time for his alleged participation in attempts to overturn the 2020 U.S. presidential election.
- August 3: Former President Donald Trump turns himself in and pleads not guilty to all four felony counts at a federal district court in Washington, D.C.
- August 4: Chris Christie becomes the second presidential candidate to visit Ukraine.
- August 9: In an interview on Newsmax, Trump states he will not pledge to support the eventual Republican nominee, one of the requirements to qualify for the primary debates.
- August 10–20: The Iowa State Fair, a traditional stop for presidential campaigns, is held in Des Moines, with Republican candidates making appearances throughout the event.
- August 11: Merrick Garland appoints David C. Weiss as special counsel to investigate President Biden's son, Hunter Biden.
- August 14:
  - Former President Donald Trump is indicted a fourth time alongside 18 co-defendants by a grand jury for attempting to overturn the election results in Georgia.
  - Nevada Republicans set February 8 as the date for their party-held caucus in protest of the state-run primary.
- August 18: Erick Erickson's The Gathering, attended by prominent Republicans, is held in Atlanta.
- August 19:
  - Libertarian candidate Chase Oliver speaks at the Des Moines Register Political Soapbox, becoming the first third-party candidate to do so.
  - Ramaswamy states that he would not accept an offer to become the Republican vice presidential nominee.
- August 20:
  - Larry Hogan states that No Labels will "very likely" run a third-party candidate if both Biden and Trump were to win their respective party nominations.
  - Republican U.S. Senator Bill Cassidy calls on Trump to withdraw from the race following his four criminal indictments.
  - Trump confirms on Truth Social that he will not participate in any primary debates.
- August 21: The Republican National Committee announces the eight candidates who will participate in the first primary debate.
- August 23: The first Republican presidential primary debate was held at Fiserv Forum in Milwaukee, hosted by Fox News.
- August 24: Former President Trump surrenders in Georgia and becomes the first president with a mug shot.
- August 25: New Hampshire Secretary of State David Scanlan begins looking into disqualifying Donald Trump from the primary ballot using the Fourteenth Amendment.
- August 29:
  - Francis Suarez suspends his presidential campaign, becoming the first major candidate to do so.
  - In an interview with Glenn Beck, Trump praises Ramaswamy, pointing to him as a potential running mate.

=== September 2023 ===
- September 6: A group of voters, led by Citizens for Responsibility and Ethics in Washington, files a lawsuit in Denver to remove Trump from the ballot in Colorado.
- September 7:
  - Community organizer Claudia De la Cruz announces her campaign as the nominee of the Party for Socialism and Liberation.
  - John Anthony Castro files a lawsuit in West Virginia challenging Trump's ballot access in the state primary.
- September 9: Stephen Yagman files a lawsuit to disqualify Trump from the California primary ballot.
- September 12:
  - A lawsuit is filed in Minnesota claiming Trump's ineligibility for the primary ballot due to his violation of Section 3 of the Fourteenth Amendment. This becomes one of the several lawsuits filed in various states on the basis that Trump engaged in an insurrection during his involvement in the January 6 Capitol attack.
  - Speaker of the House Kevin McCarthy announces an impeachment inquiry into Joe Biden, alleging that he benefited from business dealings with his son Hunter.
- September 13: Secretary Scanlan declares he will not block Trump from the primary ballot in New Hampshire.
- September 14: Hunter Biden is indicted on three firearm-related charges returned by a federal grand jury in Wilmington, Delaware.
- September 16:
  - An armed man impersonating a U.S. Marshal is arrested at a Robert Kennedy Jr. campaign event in Los Angeles.
  - The Iowa Faith and Freedom Coalition hosts its annual fall banquet in Des Moines.
- September 25: The RNC announces seven candidates will participate in the second primary debate, with Hutchinson unable to qualify.
- September 27: The second Republican presidential primary debate was held at the Ronald Reagan Presidential Library in Simi Valley, California, hosted by Fox Business.
- September 30: Free Speech for People files their second lawsuit to remove Trump from the primary ballot, this time in Michigan.

=== October 2023 ===
- October 4: New York v. Trump et al trial begins in Manhattan.
- October 5: Cornel West withdraws from the Green Party primaries to run as an independent.
- October 6: The DNC reaches a compromise with the Iowa Democratic Party, allowing the Iowa Democratic caucuses to be held first on January 15, 2024, but voting on presidential candidates would also be done via mail-in ballots until Super Tuesday, March 5, 2024.
- October 9:
  - Robert F. Kennedy Jr. withdraws from the Democratic primaries and launches an independent campaign.
  - Will Hurd withdraws from the Republican primary, endorsing Nikki Haley's campaign.
- October 12: Progressive commentator Cenk Uygur announces his presidential campaign. Despite his announcement, Uygur is ineligible to serve as president due to being born in Turkey to non U.S. citizens.
- October 13: Corey Stapleton withdraws from the Republican primary.
- October 13–14: The First in the Nation Leadership Summit is held in Nashua, New Hampshire.
- October 16: The Biden campaign launches an account on Truth Social.
- October 20:
  - Kanye West's personal attorney states that he is no longer running for president.
  - Perry Johnson withdraws from the presidential race after failing to qualify for the debates.
- October 24: With New Hampshire state officials moving forward in accordance with their state law mandating them to hold the first primary in the country, denying the DNC's request to hold it after South Carolina's, Biden campaign manager Julie Chávez Rodriguez states that he will not appear on the New Hampshire primary ballot.
- October 26:
  - Larry Elder suspends his presidential campaign and endorses Trump.
  - A man attempts to trespass on Robert F. Kennedy Jr.'s residence in Brentwood, Los Angeles, and is arrested by the Los Angeles Police Department.
  - U.S. Representative Dean Phillips files paperwork to run against President Biden for the Democratic nomination.
- October 27: Dean Phillips launches his presidential campaign in Concord, New Hampshire.
- October 27–29: The Republican Jewish Coalition holds its Annual Leadership Summit in Las Vegas.
- October 28: Mike Pence suspends his presidential campaign, making his announcement at the RJC summit.

=== November 2023 ===
- November 4: The Florida Freedom Summit is held in Kissimmee, Florida, hosted by the state GOP.
- November 8: The third Republican presidential primary debate is held in Miami.
- November 9: Activist Jill Stein, the Green Party nominee in 2012 and 2016, announces her run for the presidency.
- November 12: Tim Scott announces the suspension of his presidential campaign on Fox News.
- November 13:
  - The National Review calls on Christie and Burgum to drop out of the race upon the withdrawal of Pence and Scott, citing their low poll numbers.
  - The Nelson A. Rockefeller Center for Public Policy and the Social Sciences at Dartmouth College and the Dartmouth Political Union co-host a discussion as part of their "Path to the Presidency" speaker series with Dean Phillips to discuss his campaign and policy positions.
- November 14: A Michigan Court of Claims judge rules that Trump will remain on the state's primary ballot.
- November 15: The New Hampshire presidential primary date is set for January 23, 2024, defying the DNC's planned schedule.
- November 17: A Colorado district judge rejects an attempt to remove Trump from the state's primary ballot.
- November 18: Dean Phillips discusses the case for his campaign at the 2023 Blue Jamboree rally hosted by the Charleston County Democratic Party in South Carolina.
- November 30:
  - DeSantis participates in a televised debate with California Governor Gavin Newsom, hosted on Fox News and moderated by Sean Hannity.
  - The Florida Democratic Party only submits Biden as a candidate to the Secretary of State of Florida, effectively canceling the state primary.

=== December 2023 ===
- December 2: Muslim American leaders launch the #AbandonBiden campaign in Dearborn, Michigan, as a response to Biden's handling of the Gaza war.
- December 4: Doug Burgum suspends his presidential campaign after failing to qualify for the next debate.
- December 5: Kennedy files a lawsuit against Utah Lt. Governor Deidre Henderson and the state elections director, claiming the state's early filing deadline prevents independent candidates from gaining ballot access.
- December 6: The fourth Republican presidential primary debate is held at the University of Alabama in Tuscaloosa.
- December 7:
  - The Lesser-Known Candidates Forum was held at the New Hampshire Institute of Politics. Twenty minor candidates, both Republican and Democratic, were in attendance.
  - Ramaswamy meets with officials of the Libertarian Party of Iowa to inquire about running as a Libertarian.
- December 8: Casey DeSantis calls on voters from outside of Iowa to participate in the state caucuses, which some interpret as an encouragement for illegal voting.
- December 9: Congressman Randy Feenstra hosts the Faith and Family with the Feenstras event in Sioux Center, Iowa.
- December 11: Tyler Anderson of Dover, New Hampshire, is arrested and charged with threatening to kill Ramaswamy after his security team notified local law enforcement of text messages sent to the campaign.
- December 11: Former Bellflower, California Mayor Art Olivier files to run for the Libertarian nomination for president.
- December 13: The House of Representatives votes 221–212 to formalize the impeachment inquiry into President Joe Biden. Lawmakers voted along party lines to back a resolution that Republicans say will give them more power to gather evidence and enforce legal demands.
- December 16–19: AmericaFest 2023 is hosted by Turning Point USA at the Phoenix Convention Center in Phoenix, Arizona.
- December 19: In its ruling in Anderson v. Griswold, the Colorado Supreme Court declares that Trump is ineligible from appearing on the state primary ballot, becoming the first time that a presidential candidate has been disqualified based on the Fourteenth Amendment. The court immediately issues a stay on its ruling pending appeals to the U.S. Supreme Court.
- December 23: Congressman Dean Phillips calls for Biden to "thoughtfully exit" the 2024 race.
- December 28:
  - Maine Secretary of State Shenna Bellows disqualifies Trump from the state ballot. The decision was paused pending a potential appeal in state court.
  - California Secretary of State Shirley Weber certifies Trump for the state ballot, despite calls for removal from Lieutenant Governor Eleni Kounalakis, as well as other state officials.
- December 30: The #AbandonBiden campaign announces plans to expand to all fifty states.

== 2024 ==
=== January 2024 ===
- January 5: The U.S. Supreme Court agrees to hear Trump's appeal of the decision to remove him from the Colorado primary ballot.
- January 7: The Iowa Brown and Black Forum, scheduled for January 13, is canceled, as not enough responses are received.
- January 8: New England College hosts a debate between Democratic primary candidates Williamson and Phillips in Manchester, New Hampshire. The debate was broadcast on satellite radio by SiriusXM and was moderated by Josh McElveen, who was the former political director of WMUR.
- January 10:
  - Chris Christie suspends his presidential campaign after failing to qualify for the next debate.
  - The fifth Republican presidential primary debate is held at Drake University in Des Moines, Iowa, hosted by CNN.
  - At a Fox News town hall, Trump states that he has already picked his running mate, but refuses to say who it is.
- January 12:
  - Mail-in voting for the Democratic caucuses in Iowa begins.
  - U.S. Senator Rand Paul launches the "Never Nikki" website.
  - NewsNation hosts a forum of Democratic candidates featuring Williamson, Phillips, and Uygur. Biden was invited but did not attend. The discussion was moderated by Dan Abrams.
  - United States Attorney General Merrick Garland appoints Robert Hur as special counsel in President Biden's handling of classified documents case.
  - Dean Phillips tells Politico that he believes representatives of the Biden campaign were using access to pressure liberal media outlets into blackballing and not platforming him.
- January 15: Iowa caucuses
  - Trump wins the Iowa Republican caucuses, the first contest of the Republican primaries. In the Iowa Republican contest Trump won 20 delegates, DeSantis won 9 delegates, Haley won 8 delegates, and Ramaswamy won 3 delegates.
  - Vivek Ramaswamy, who finished in fourth place, suspends his presidential campaign and endorses Trump.
  - Dean Phillips participates in a forum with Bill Ackman and Elon Musk. During the forum, after hearing about the various challenges the Democratic Party presented to Phillips's campaign, Musk states, "Getting candidates, especially popular candidates that are quite viable, removed from ballots is taking that decision away from the public, which is fundamentally anti-democratic ... Some political party shouldn't think that they know better than the public."
- January 16:
  - Asa Hutchinson suspends his presidential campaign after finishing in sixth place in the Iowa caucuses and endorses Haley.
  - Kennedy announces the formation of the We the People Party in an effort to gain ballot access.
  - The sixth Republican presidential primary debate, scheduled to be held at Saint Anselm College in Goffstown, New Hampshire on January 18 and hosted by ABC News, is canceled.
- January 17: The seventh Republican presidential primary debate, scheduled to be held at Saint Anselm College on January 21 and hosted by CNN, is canceled.
- January 18:
  - Phillips holds campaign events in Manchester and Hanover, New Hampshire, with 2020 Democratic Primary presidential candidate Andrew Yang.
  - Free & Equal Elections Foundation hosts a debate between Democratic Party candidates for president at Chelsea Television Studios in New York City. Christina Tobin moderated the debate. All candidates registered for the ballot "in at least four states" were invited: Biden, Phillips, Williamson, Uygur, Gabriel Cornejo, Stephen Lyons, Jason Palmer, and Frank Lozada. However, only the latter four candidates chose to participate.
- January 20:
  - Phillips tells Axios that he thinks it would be "impossible" for Biden to do the job for four more years. And even being so blunt as to say, "At that stage of life, it is impossible ultimately to conduct, to prosecute the office of the American presidency in the way that this country in the world needs right now. That is an absolute truth."
  - Trump starts his rally in Manchester, New Hampshire, by telling New Hampshire Democrats to vote for Phillips in the New Hampshire Democratic presidential primary to signal to Biden that "you don't abandon us."
- January 21: Ron DeSantis suspends his presidential campaign and endorses Trump.
- January 22: The New Hampshire attorney general's office begins investigating an audio deepfake robocall of President Biden that encouraged people not to vote in the state primary.
- January 23: New Hampshire presidential primaries
  - President Biden wins the non-binding New Hampshire Democratic primary through write-in votes.
  - Trump wins the New Hampshire Republican primary.
- January 25: The Oregon Progressive Party nominates Cornel West for the state ballot.
- January 26: A jury ordered Donald Trump to pay E. Jean Carroll $83 million in additional emotional, reputation-related, and punitive damages. Carroll had amended her original defamation lawsuit to include comments made by Trump after the May 2023 verdict.
- January 27: President Biden and Congressman Phillips speak at the South Carolina Democratic Party's First-in-the-Nation Celebration dinner in Columbia, South Carolina.
- January 31: Cornel West announces the formation of the Justice for All Party in order to expand his ballot access.

=== February 2024 ===
- February 2:
  - A judge in Washington, D.C., delays Trump's election interference trial indefinitely.
  - The Wisconsin Supreme Court unanimously ordered election officials to put Phillips on the presidential primary ballot after the Wisconsin Elections Commission had excluded him.
- February 3:
  - President Biden wins the South Carolina Democratic primary.
  - The Delaware Democratic primary for president is canceled because Biden is the only candidate to make it on the ballot by the filing deadline of February 2.
- February 5: Special Counsel Robert Hur releases his report on Biden's handling of classified documents. He states that "no criminal charges are warranted" and that the probe "uncovered evidence that President Biden willfully retained and disclosed classified materials after his vice presidency when he was a private citizen."
- February 6: Nevada presidential primaries (state-organized).
  - President Biden wins the Nevada Democratic primary.
  - Nikki Haley wins the non-binding Nevada Republican primary, although "None of These Candidates" received the most votes.
- February 7:
  - Democratic candidate Marianne Williamson drops out of the race.
- February 8: Trump wins the party-organized Nevada and U.S. Virgin Islands Republican caucuses.
- February 11: A super PAC supporting Robert F. Kennedy Jr. airs a commercial during Super Bowl LVIII based on a John F. Kennedy 1960 campaign ad, causing controversy within the Kennedy family.
- February 21: Trump acknowledges the existence of a shortlist of potential running mates and names six candidates at a town hall hosted by Laura Ingraham.
- February 24:
  - Trump wins the South Carolina Republican primary. In the South Carolina Republican primary, Trump secured forty seven delegates and Haley grabbed three delegates from South Carolina's Charleston-based 1st Congressional District.
  - In the 2024 CPAC vice presidential straw poll, Ramaswamy and Kristi Noem are tied for first place, with Tulsi Gabbard in second.
- February 25: Kennedy speaks at a convention held by the Libertarian Party of California, fueling speculation of his possible Libertarian candidacy.
- February 26: RNC chair Ronna McDaniel and co-chair Drew McKissick announce their resignations from their respective positions, effective March 8.
- February 27: Michigan presidential primaries.
  - President Biden wins the Michigan Democratic primary.
  - Trump wins the Michigan Republican primary.
  - The Socialist Equality Party announces their presidential ticket: Joseph Kishore for president and Jerry White for vice president.
- February 28:
  - Cook County, Illinois Circuit Judge Tracie Porter declares that Trump is ineligible from appearing on the state ballot. This decision is also paused pending a potential appeal.
  - Marianne Williamson re-enters the race after the results of the Michigan primary.
- February 29: The Free & Equal Elections Foundation hosts a multiparty debate at Chelsea Studios in New York City, moderated by Christina Tobin.

=== March 2024 ===
- March 1: The District of Columbia Republican primary begins.
- March 2: Trump wins the Idaho, Michigan, and Missouri Republican caucuses.
- March 3: Haley is announced as the winner of the Republican primary in the District of Columbia.
- March 4:
  - The U.S. Supreme Court unanimously rules in Trump v. Anderson that efforts by the state of Colorado along with Illinois and Maine to remove Trump from the ballot per the Fourteenth Amendment are unconstitutional. In a per curiam opinion, the majority ruled that this was a power exclusively held by Congress.
  - Trump wins the North Dakota Republican caucuses.
- March 5: Super Tuesday
  - Democratic primaries:
    - President Biden wins fifteen states: Alabama, Arkansas, California, Colorado, Iowa, Maine, Massachusetts, Minnesota, North Carolina, Oklahoma, Tennessee, Texas, Utah, Vermont, and Virginia.
    - Businessman Jason Palmer wins the American Samoa Democratic caucus.
  - Republican primaries:
    - Trump wins fourteen states: Alabama, Alaska, Arkansas, California, Colorado, Maine, Massachusetts, Minnesota, North Carolina, Oklahoma, Tennessee, Texas, Utah, and Virginia.
    - Haley wins the Vermont primary.
- March 6:
  - Nikki Haley suspends her campaign after her poor performance on Super Tuesday.
  - Dean Phillips suspends his campaign and endorses Biden.
  - After Dean Phillips drops out of the race, President Biden calls Phillips on the phone. Phillips says the two "had a wonderful conversation" that ended in an invitation to discuss the state of the 2024 race at the White House.
  - President Biden wins the Hawaii Democratic caucus.
- March 7: President Biden delivers the 2024 State of the Union Address.
- March 8:
  - Michael Whatley and Lara Trump are elected as chair and co-chair of the Republican National Committee, respectively.
  - Trump wins the American Samoa Republican caucuses.
- March 12:
  - President Biden wins the Georgia, Mississippi, Northern Mariana Islands, and Washington primaries, clinching enough delegates to become the presumptive nominee of the Democratic Party.
  - Trump wins the Georgia, Hawaii, Mississippi, and Washington primaries, clinching enough delegates to become the presumptive nominee of the Republican Party.
- March 15: Trump wins the Northern Mariana Islands Republican caucuses.
- March 16: Trump wins the Guam Republican caucuses.
- March 19:
  - President Biden wins the Arizona, Florida, Illinois, Kansas, and Ohio primaries. Despite having already dropped out, Dean Phillips wins three delegates in the Ohio primary. Congressman Phillips was still on the ballot on election day and gains his delegates by meeting the 15% threshold of votes needed to receive a delegate in a congressional district in the state's 2nd, 6th, and 14th districts.
  - Trump wins the Arizona, Florida, Illinois, Kansas, and Ohio primaries.
- March 22: The North Dakota Democratic primary begins, with voting taking place almost entirely by mail.
- March 23:
  - President Biden wins the Louisiana and Missouri primaries.
  - Trump wins the Louisiana Republican primary.
- March 25: Libertarian National Committee chair Angela McArdle confirms that she is in talks with Kennedy in seeking the Libertarian nomination.
- March 26: Kennedy announces Nicole Shanahan, an attorney and technologist, as his running mate at an event in Oakland, California.
- March 30: President Biden wins the North Dakota Democratic primary.

=== April 2024 ===
- April 2:
  - President Biden wins the Connecticut, New York, Rhode Island, Wisconsin primaries. And the Delaware Democratic presidential primary was canceled, with the delegates awarded to Biden.
  - Trump wins the Connecticut, New York, Rhode Island and Wisconsin primaries.
- April 10: Cornel West announces Melina Abdullah as his running mate in an appearance on The Tavis Smiley Show.
- April 13:
  - President Biden wins the Wyoming caucus and the Alaska primary.
  - Kennedy rules out running as a nominee of the Libertarian Party.
- April 14: A number of major news organizations sign an open letter to Biden and Trump, urging them to attend the general election debates.
- April 15: The trial for New York v. Donald Trump begins.
- April 18–20: Trump wins the Wyoming Republican caucuses.
- April 21: Trump wins the Puerto Rico Republican primary.
- April 23: Pennsylvania presidential primaries
  - President Biden wins the Pennsylvania Democratic primary.
  - Trump wins the Pennsylvania Republican primary.
- April 24–27: The Constitution Party National Convention is held in Salt Lake City, Utah.
- April 25: The trial for Trump v. United States begins.
- April 26:
  - President Biden states in an interview with Howard Stern that he is willing to participate in the general election debates with Trump.
  - U.S. Secretary of State Antony Blinken says in an interview that the U.S. has seen evidence of China attempting "to influence and arguably interfere" with the 2024 elections.
- April 27:
  - Anti-abortion activist Randall Terry is selected as the Constitution Party's presidential nominee, with pastor Stephen Broden as his running mate.
  - Jill Stein is among more than 80 individuals arrested at Washington University in St. Louis amidst the Gaza war protests on university campuses.
  - On April 27, President Biden wins all of New Hampshire's pledged delegates in a party-backed firehouse primary held by the New Hampshire Democratic Party at Saint Anselm College's New Hampshire Institute of Politics.
- April 28:
  - President Biden wins the Puerto Rico Democratic primary.
  - Trump and DeSantis hold a private meeting in Miami, arranged by real estate broker Steve Witkoff.

=== May 2024 ===
- May 2: Reports indicate that Trump has reduced his running mate shortlist to four individuals and would hold private meetings with them at Mar-a-Lago. Burgum and Scott are on the list, along with U.S. senators Marco Rubio of Florida and JD Vance of Ohio.
- May 7: Indiana presidential primaries
  - President Biden wins the Indiana Democratic primary.
  - Trump wins the Indiana Republican primary.
- May 14:
  - President Biden wins the Maryland, Nebraska, and West Virginia primaries. Despite having already dropped out, Congressman Dean Phillips wins one delegate in the Nebraska primary by receiving the most votes of any candidate in Logan County.
  - Trump wins the Maryland, Nebraska, and West Virginia primaries.
- May 15:
  - CNN announces a presidential debate to be held between Biden and Trump on June 27, prior to the Republican and Democratic nominating conventions, while ABC News announces another will be held on September 10.
  - The RNC announces that Randy Evans, Russell Vought, and Ed Martin will lead the platform committee for the national convention in July.
- May 21:
  - President Biden wins the Kentucky and Oregon primaries.
  - Trump wins the Kentucky and Oregon primaries.
- May 23:
  - President Biden wins the Idaho Democratic caucuses.
  - The Reform Party nominates Kennedy at their National Convention.
- May 24: The Libertarian National Convention begins in Washington, D.C.
- May 25: Trump addresses the Libertarian National Convention and is met with backlash from the audience.
- May 26: After seven rounds of voting, Chase Oliver is chosen as the Libertarian Party's presidential nominee, with Mike ter Maat as his running mate. Kennedy was eliminated in the first round, while Trump was not eligible to run for the nomination.
- May 30: Trump is found guilty on all 34 counts in his New York trial, making him the first U.S. president to be convicted of a felony.

=== June 2024 ===
- June 4:
  - President Biden wins the District of Columbia, Montana, New Jersey, New Mexico, and South Dakota primaries.
  - Trump wins the Montana, New Jersey and New Mexico primaries, while the South Dakota primary was cancelled.
- June 8: President Biden wins the Guam and the U.S. Virgin Islands Democratic caucuses.
- June 11: Marianne Williamson ends her campaign following the end of the Democratic primaries.
- June 12: The US House of Representatives votes to hold US Attorney General Merrick Garland in contempt of Congress. Garland refused to fully comply with a congressional subpoena to turn over interview audio tapes from Robert Hur's special counsel justice department probe of President Joe Biden's handling of classified documents.
- June 13: Trump holds a meeting with top CEOs, including Tim Cook, Jamie Dimon, and Doug McMillon.
- June 27: Biden and Trump hold their first campaign debate hosted by CNN in Atlanta, prior to the nominating conventions. Biden's poor performance is met with calls for him to suspend his campaign.

=== July 2024 ===
- July 1: The U.S. Supreme Court delivers a 6–3 decision in Trump v. United States, along ideological lines, ruling that Trump had absolute immunity for acts he committed as president within his core constitutional purview, at least presumptive immunity for official acts within the outer perimeter of his official responsibility, and no immunity for unofficial acts. Trump's sentencing date for his convictions in New York is delayed from July to September 2024, and likely the trial dates in Trump's other cases will be delayed as well, to review the applicability of the Supreme Court's decision.
- July 2:
  - Eliza Cooney accuses Kennedy of multiple instances of sexual assault while she worked for his family as a part-time babysitter in the 1990s.
  - U.S. Representative Lloyd Doggett becomes the first Democratic member of Congress after the presidential debate to publicly call for President Biden to withdraw from the race.
  - Marianne Williamson re-enters the presidential race and calls for an open convention.
- July 3: Representative Raúl Grijalva calls on Biden to withdraw from the race.
- July 4: Representative Seth Moulton calls on Biden to withdraw from the race.
- July 5:
  - In an interview with George Stephanopoulos on ABC News, President Biden states that he will not end his candidacy.
  - Representative Mike Quigley calls on Biden to withdraw from the race.
- July 6: Representative Angie Craig calls on Biden to withdraw from the race.
- July 8:
  - President Biden appears on Morning Joe to state his frustration with the "elites" and challenges them to run against him at the convention.
  - Representative Adam Smith calls on Biden to withdraw from the race.
- July 9: Representative Mikie Sherrill calls on Biden to withdraw from the race.
- July 10: Representatives Pat Ryan and Earl Blumenauer call on Biden to withdraw from the race. Senator Peter Welch calls on Biden to withdraw from the race, making him the first senator to do so.
- July 11:
  - President Biden holds a press conference at the conclusion of the NATO Washington summit to address his capability of continuing to hold the presidency and run for re-election. He makes multiple mistakes while speaking.
  - Representatives Hillary Scholten, Brad Schneider, Ed Case, Greg Stanton, Marie Gluesenkamp Perez, Jim Himes, Scott Peters, and Eric Sorenson call on Biden to withdraw from the race.
  - An attempt by the House of Representatives to find United States Attorney General Merrick Garland in "inherent contempt" falls short in a 204 to 210 vote, with four Republicans voting with all Democrats to oppose the measure. The resolution would have imposed a fine of $10,000 per day on Garland for defying a congressional subpoena until he handed over audio of former special counsel Robert Hur's interview with President Biden.
- July 12:
  - Free & Equal holds second multiparty debate at FreedomFest in Las Vegas.
  - Representatives Brittany Pettersen and Mike Levin call on Biden to withdraw from the race.
- July 13: Trump is shot in the ear in an assassination attempt at a campaign rally held in Butler, Pennsylvania. One bystander and the shooter are killed and two others are injured.
- July 15:
  - The 2024 Republican National Convention begins in Milwaukee, Wisconsin. The theme for the first day is "Make America Wealthy Once Again."
  - Trump announces U.S. Senator JD Vance as his vice presidential running mate, shortly before being confirmed as the Republican presidential nominee.
  - Iowa GOP chair Jeff Kaufmann formally nominates Trump for president, while Ohio Lt. Governor Jon Husted nominates Vance for vice president.
- July 17:
  - Biden says he would consider stepping aside if officially diagnosed with a medical condition.
  - Biden tests positive for COVID-19.
  - Representative Adam Schiff calls on Biden to withdraw from the race.
  - Former House Democratic Leader Nancy Pelosi tells Biden he cannot win and that staying in would harm the House race.
  - Senate Majority Leader Chuck Schumer calls on Biden to withdraw from the race in a meeting.
  - The DNC delays a plan to nominate Biden before August after concerns from House Minority Leader Hakeem Jeffries and Senate Majority Leader Chuck Schumer.
  - JD Vance speaks on the third day of the RNC.
- July 18:
  - Trump speaks on the final day of the RNC.
  - Representative Jamie Raskin and Senator Jon Tester call for Biden to withdraw from the race.
- July 19: Senators Martin Heinrich and Sherrod Brown call on Biden to withdraw from the race. Representatives Marc Veasey, Jared Huffman, Chuy Garcia, Mark Pocan, Zoe Lofgren, Sean Casten, Greg Landsman, Betty McCollum, Kathy Castor, Morgan McGarvey, and Gabe Vasquez also call for Biden to withdraw.
- July 21:
  - Biden announces his withdrawal from the race, necessitating the start of an "emergency transition process" for the Democratic nomination.
  - Vice President Kamala Harris quickly announces her own candidacy for president.
  - The Biden Victory Fund informs the Federal Election Commission of its conversion to a "Harris Victory Fund".
  - U.S. Representative Phillips proposes a straw poll of delegates ahead of the Democratic National Convention to determine the party's top four presidential contenders, who would then take part in four town halls outlining their platforms. After the town halls, the delegates would vote to choose the nominee.
  - Emergency Zoom calls take place among the convention delegates. Harris received the endorsement of many of them by end of the day.
  - The Congressional Black Caucus endorses Harris.
  - Harris receives a cascade of endorsements by governors and congress members.
  - Trump and Vance, as well as other congressional Republicans, call for Biden to resign as president.
- July 22: After a survey of Democratic delegates by the Associated Press, Kamala Harris becomes the new presumptive presidential candidate for the Democratic Party.
- July 23:
  - Secret Service Director Kimberly Cheatle resigns after a congressional hearing on the attempted assassination of Donald Trump. She is replaced by her deputy director Ronald L. Rowe Jr. the same day.
  - The New York Times reports that during his campaign, Dean Phillips "found himself "deplatformed," taken off the ballot in some states, and rarely invited on television to make his case."
- July 24:
  - The DNC rules committee maps out online rules for the nomination.
  - Jason Palmer released his delegates and encouraged them to vote for Harris at the convention.
- July 25: U.S. House Representative Jared Golden of Maine's 2nd congressional district and co-chair of the Blue Dog Coalition for the 118th Congress tells Axios he would "absolutely not" commit to voting for the Democratic presidential nominee Kamala Harris in November and is "going to wait and see what she puts forward and what her vision for the future of the country is."
- July 26: Former president Barack Obama and former First Lady Michelle Obama endorse Harris in a joint statement.
- July 29: Williamson announces she did not file a run against Harris in the virtual roll call vote, ending her campaign.
- July 31: In an interview at the National Association of Black Journalists's annual convention, Trump questions Harris's racial identity, stating "she was Indian all the way and all of a sudden she made a turn and she became a Black person."

=== August 2024 ===
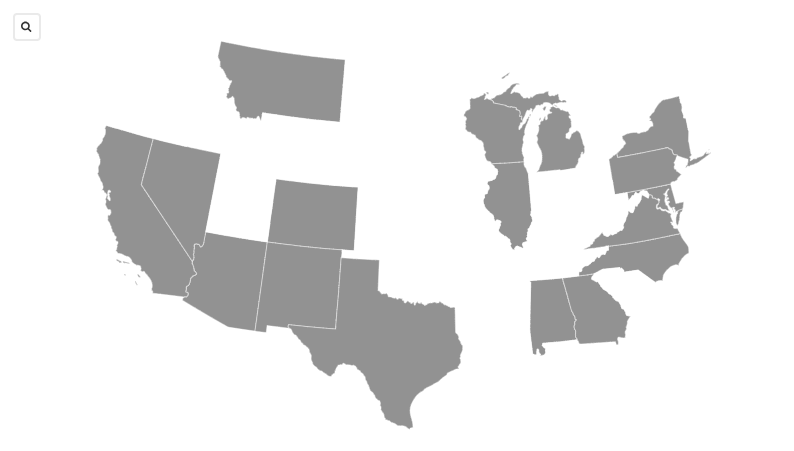
Presidential candidates Trump and Harris campaigned in 17 states, excluding their home states, from August to November in the 2024 United States presidential election.

- August 1–5: The Democratic "roll call" to nominate Kamala Harris is held online.
- August 3: Former president Jimmy Carter endorses Harris.
- August 4: Twenty-nine Uncommitted delegates from eight states take part in a virtual roll call where they voted for Palestinian victims over Harris.
- August 5: Kamala Harris is officially confirmed as the Democratic presidential nominee.
- August 6:
  - Kamala Harris announces Governor Tim Walz as her vice presidential running mate.
  - Harris and Walz are certified as nominated.
- August 7: This was the original deadline for final candidate names to be submitted to the Ohio Secretary of State for printing on ballots and voter materials, weeks before the planned Democratic National Convention. Democrats implemented the virtual roll call nomination process as a workaround. The Ohio legislature postponed the date to August 23, but Democrats continued with the virtual roll call as planned, as the bill does not take effect until September 1.
- August 15–18: The 2024 Green National Convention is held online.
- August 16: Stein announces Butch Ware, a historian at the University of California, Santa Barbara, as her running mate.
- August 17: Delegates at the Green Party's National Convention vote to nominate Jill Stein as the party's presidential candidate and Dr. Butch Ware as the party's vice presidential candidate.
- August 19–22: The 2024 Democratic National Convention is held in Chicago, Illinois.
- August 23: Robert F. Kennedy Jr. holds a conference in Phoenix where he announces that he is suspending his campaign and, despite his name remaining on the ballot in most states, endorsing Trump.
- August 26: Trump's visit to Arlington National Cemetery develops into an incident when a cemetery official attempts to stop his team from bringing external videographers.

=== September 2024 ===
- September 6: Former vice president Dick Cheney and former Congresswoman Liz Cheney announce their endorsements for Harris.
- September 10:
  - A second campaign debate, the first between Trump and Harris, is hosted by ABC in Philadelphia.
  - Singer-songwriter Taylor Swift endorses Harris after the debate in a highly publicized Instagram post.
- September 15: An assassination attempt takes place at the Trump International Golf Club in West Palm Beach, Florida, while Donald Trump is golfing. No one is injured and the suspect is caught before firing a shot.
- September 20: Voting for the 2024 presidential election commences with the onset of the 46-day start date for early voting in Minnesota and South Dakota.
- September 26: The Trump campaign outsources on-the-ground campaigning in swing states to America PAC, whose sole donor is Elon Musk.

=== October 2024 ===
- October 1: A vice presidential debate between Vance and Walz is hosted by CBS in New York City.
- October 7: America PAC announces it will offer $47 to supporters who refer another registered voter in a swing state to sign a petition in support of the First and Second Amendments.
- October 10: Musk increases the reward for signing the petition to $100 and pledges to give $1 million to a random signer each day.
- October 17: CNN Contributor Reena Ninan said all Arab Americans she can find are voting for a third party or Trump if they vote at all.
- October 24: A 35-year-old man is arrested for lighting a U.S. Postal Service mailbox on fire in Phoenix, Arizona, damaging a number of mail-in ballots.
- October 25:
  - The Washington Post announces that it will not endorse a presidential candidate for the first time since 1988, a decision reportedly made by owner Jeff Bezos. The decision comes two days after the Los Angeles Times made the decision not to endorse a presidential candidate, and the same day as interns at The Nation write a repudiation of the magazine's endorsement of Kamala Harris.
  - In an Ipsos poll, 49% of respondents say Trump is a fascist, defined as "a political extremist who seeks to act as a dictator, disregards individual rights and threatens or uses force against their opponents;" 22% see Harris as a fascist.
- October 27: Trump organises a rally at Madison Square Garden at which comedian Tony Hinchcliffe describes Puerto Rico as a "floating island of garbage". The widely condemned joke and its potential ramifications are described as a potential October surprise, as commentators suggest it could influence the vote of Puerto Ricans living in swing states, particularly in Pennsylvania.
- October 28: House Speaker Mike Johnson, at a campaign event regarding healthcare changes, responds to an attendee's question "No Obamacare?" with "No Obamacare." The Trump campaign denies wanting to repeal the act.
- October 29: In a video call, Biden refers to Hinchcliffe's joke and makes a comment interpreted as calling Trump's supporters 'garbage', for which he receives a rebuttal from Harris. This was regarded by many as potentially damaging for the Democratic Party's attempts to woo undecided voters, as well as sidelining a large proportion of the American population who support Trump. Despite stenographer concerns, the White House changes a transcript of Biden's 'garbage' remarks from "supporters" to "supporter's", which would make the remark refer to Hinchcliffe.
- October 30:
  - In a response to Biden's 'garbage' comment, Trump holds a rally while driving a garbage truck and wearing a garbage worker vest. During this rally, he states, "I'm the president. I want to protect the women of our country. ... I'm going to do it, whether the women like it or not", and specifically criticizes that his advisors had told him not to use that line because it would be "inappropriate". Harris uses Trump's comment in a rally in the context of bodily autonomy, while others related the comment to his sexual misconduct cases.
  - In addition, HuffPost spoke with Puerto Rican voters in Pennsylvania after the event, one of whom stated that he saw Trump's garbage truck campaign stop as an endorsement of Hinchcliffe's remark and an additional insult. Staff from both campaigns believed that the event would remind voters more of Hinchcliffe than of Biden's gaffe.
- October 31:
  - Trump makes a post on his Truth Social account claiming that "We caught them CHEATING BIG in Pennsylvania."
  - At a campaign event, Trump calls Liz Cheney "deranged" and comments, "She's a radical war hawk. Let's put her with the rifle standing there with nine barrels shooting at her. OK, let's see how she feels about it. You know, when the guns are trained on her face." Cheney as well as Harris campaign staff compared the comment to a death threat and a firing squad, while Arizona prosecutors opened an investigation into whether Trump's comments qualified as a death threat which would be unlawful. Many conservative commentators assessed Trumps' comments were describing Cheney as a "chickenhawk".

=== November 2024 ===
All times on the Election Day as well as the day after are listed according to the Eastern Time Zone.

- November 1: Green parties from 16 European countries ask Stein to drop out and endorse Kamala Harris, arguing that "Harris is the only candidate who can block Donald Trump and his anti-democratic, authoritarian policies." Stein's team says it will not drop out.
- November 2: At a rally, Trump repeats his accusation that Harris never worked at a McDonald's. After an audience member shouted "She worked on a corner!" in a reference to prostitution, Trump responded by laughing and saying "This place is amazing. Just remember it's other people saying it, it's not me."
- November 3:
  - At a rally, Trump states, "I have this piece of glass here. But all we have really over here is the fake news. And to get me, somebody would have to shoot through the fake news. And I don't mind that so much. I don't mind that." with the initial part referring to his July 2024 attempted assassination and the resultant bulletproof glass surrounding him. After wide reporting by media outlets, his campaign spokesperson refers to his comments as "brilliant" and denies that the comments had anything to do with harming the media. At the same rally, Trump also states, "I shouldn't have left [office]" as well as "I think we're going to start having a little fun with Michelle [Obama]. I think we're going to have a little fun with Michelle."
  - Kamala Harris tells reporters that she has cast her vote, sending a mail ballot to her home state of California.
- November 5: Election Day. Polls across United States open for voters to cast their votes. In total, approximately 156 million Americans cast their votes, either by mail or in person, which is less than 158 million in 2020.
  - 12:07 a.m.: Polls close in the New Hampshire midnight voting. Voters in Dixville Notch voted 3-3 for Harris and Trump.
  - 5:00 a.m.: Straw polls close in Guam. Unofficial results published 6.5 hours later show Harris wins over Trump with a margin of three percent.
  - 6:00 a.m.: First polls open in Connecticut, Eastern Indiana, Eastern Kentucky, Maine, New Hampshire, New Jersey, New York, Virginia and Vermont. Polling places in Vermont can open as early as 5 AM. In the following six hours, polls were open nationwide.
  - 11:52 a.m.: Donald Trump casts his vote in Palm Beach, Florida with his family.
  - 6:00 p.m.: First polls close in Eastern Indiana and Eastern Kentucky using Eastern Time.
  - 7:07 p.m.: The first state to be called is Indiana, for Trump, being closely followed by Vermont for Harris and Kentucky for Trump.
  - 11:18 p.m.: The first swing state is called, with North Carolina being called for Donald Trump.
- November 6: Donald Trump and JD Vance win the election in the early morning. Heads of most nations and international organizations send their congratulations to Donald Trump. Kamala Harris formally concedes later in the afternoon. The second presidential transition of Donald Trump starts.
  - 12:58 a.m.: The next swing state to be called is Georgia, being called for Donald Trump.
  - 1:00 a.m.: Polls close in Western Alaska using Hawaii–Aleutian Time. All polls are now closed.
  - 2:24 a.m.: Pennsylvania is the next swing state to be called, being called for Donald Trump.
  - 2:54 a.m.: Emmanuel Macron, President of France, congratulates Donald Trump.
  - 2:56 a.m.: Benjamin Netanyahu, Prime Minister of Israel, congratulates Donald Trump for "history's greatest comeback".
  - 3:08 a.m.: Volodymyr Zelenskyy, President of Ukraine, congratulates Donald Trump for winning the election.
  - 3:21 a.m.: Keir Starmer, Prime Minister of United Kingdom, issues a statement congratulating Donald Trump.
  - 5:34 a.m.: Wisconsin is the next swing state to be called, being called for Donald Trump. With enough elector votes secured, Donald Trump is declared to have won the election by the Associated Press.
  - 12:54 p.m.: Michigan is the next swing state called for Donald Trump.
  - 2:40 p.m.: President Joe Biden calls President-elect Donald Trump to congratulate him and makes formal invitation to discuss the transition. Trump accepts the invitation four hours later.
  - 4:20 p.m.: Kamala Harris delivers her concession speech at Howard University.
  - Before 10:21 p.m.: Xi Jinping, General Secretary of the Chinese Communist Party and President of China, congratulates Donald Trump.
- November 7: Vladimir Putin, President of Russia, congratulates Donald Trump.
- November 8: President-elect Donald Trump prepares to withdraw from the Paris Agreement again.
- November 9: Nevada and Arizona are both called for Donald Trump, which means Trump has won all seven swing states and secured 312 elector votes.
- November 12: U.S. Representative Lloyd Doggett, who was the first sitting Democrat in Congress to openly call for President Joe Biden to withdraw from the 2024 United States presidential election after the first presidential debate, states after Trump's win, "I only regret I didn't do it earlier ... I believe that the only person in our caucus who doesn't share some responsibility for the outcome is Dean Phillips, who came out early."
- November 22: Georgia certifies its election results.

=== December 2024 ===
- December 11: (at least six days prior to the first Tuesday after the second Wednesday in December): the "safe harbor" deadline under the Electoral Count Act, where states must finally resolve any controversies over the selection of their electors of the Electoral College.
- December 17: (the Tuesday after the second Wednesday in December): The electors met in their respective state capitals (the electors for the District of Columbia meet within their district) and formally voted for the president and vice president. The number of states that prohibit faithless electors were subject to change. In 2020, 33 states and D.C. had such laws. Trump officially received 312 total electoral votes and Harris 226, with no faithless electors recorded.

== 2025 ==
- January 6: The electoral votes were formally counted before a joint session of Congress; the President of the Senate Kamala Harris formally announced the electoral result, and declared her rival in the election, Donald Trump, winner.
- January 20: Donald Trump and JD Vance were inaugurated as the 47th president and 50th vice president of the United States.

== Candidate participation timeline ==
Candidate announcement and, if applicable, withdrawal dates are as follows:

Political party
Democratic Party
Republican Party
Libertarian Party
Green Party
Constitution Party
Party for Socialism and Liberation
American; Solidarity Party
People's Party
Independent candidate
Exploratory committee
Events
Midterm elections
Iowa caucuses
Super Tuesday
First debate
Second debate
Republican Convention
Democratic Convention
Election Day
Inauguration Day

== See also ==
- Timeline of the Joe Biden presidency
