= 2024 Iowa caucuses =

2024 Iowa caucuses may refer to:

- 2024 Iowa Democratic presidential caucuses
- 2024 Iowa Republican presidential caucuses
