= 2024 Iowa caucus =

In 2024, there were two caucuses in Iowa, both of them on January 15:

- 2024 Iowa Republican presidential caucuses
- 2024 Iowa Democratic presidential caucuses
