= 2024 Minnesota Legal Marijuana Now presidential primary =

- March 5, 2024
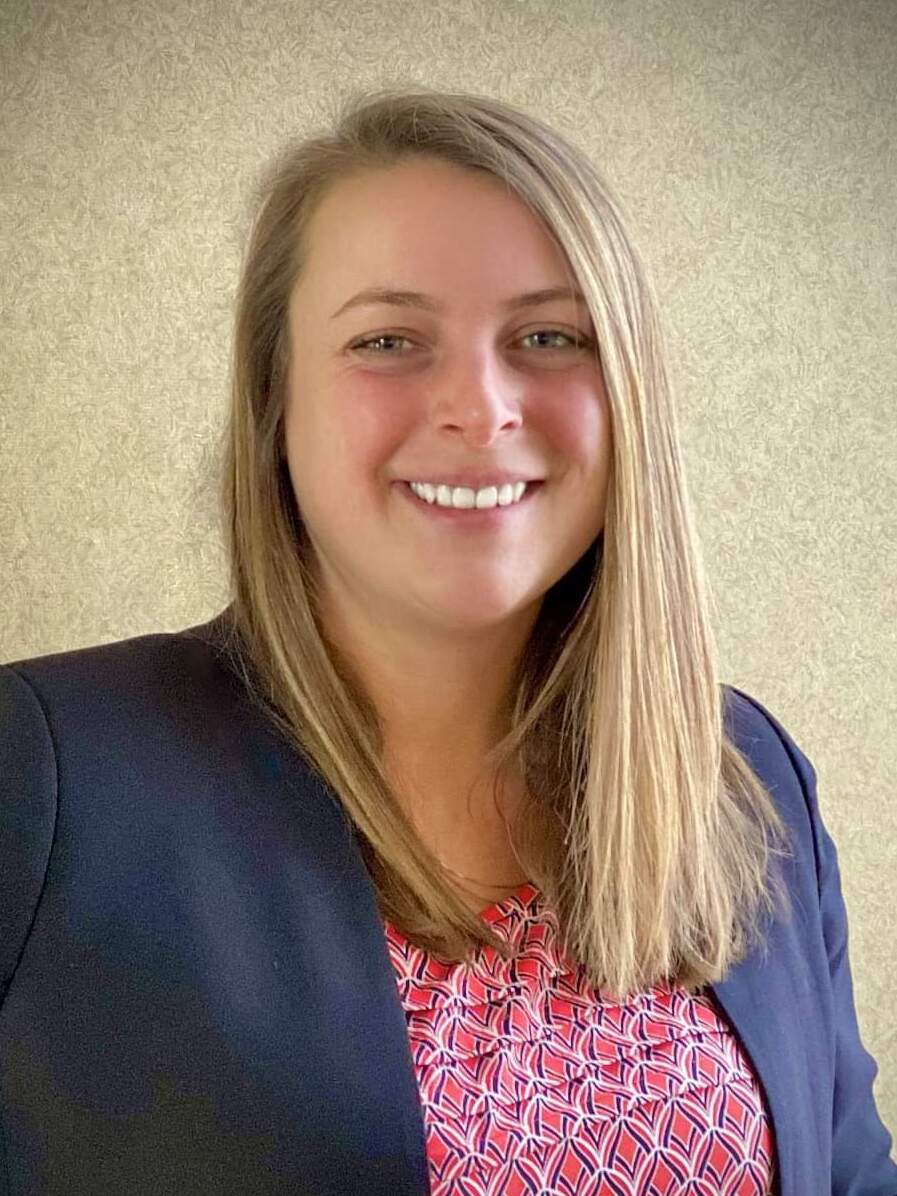

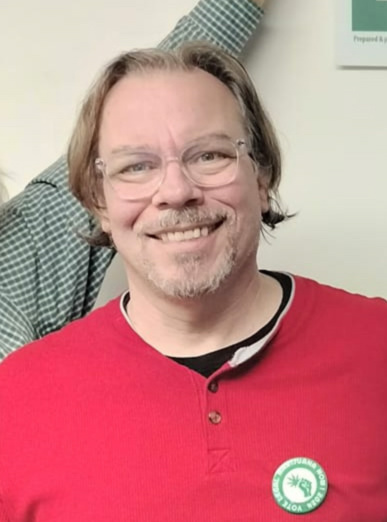

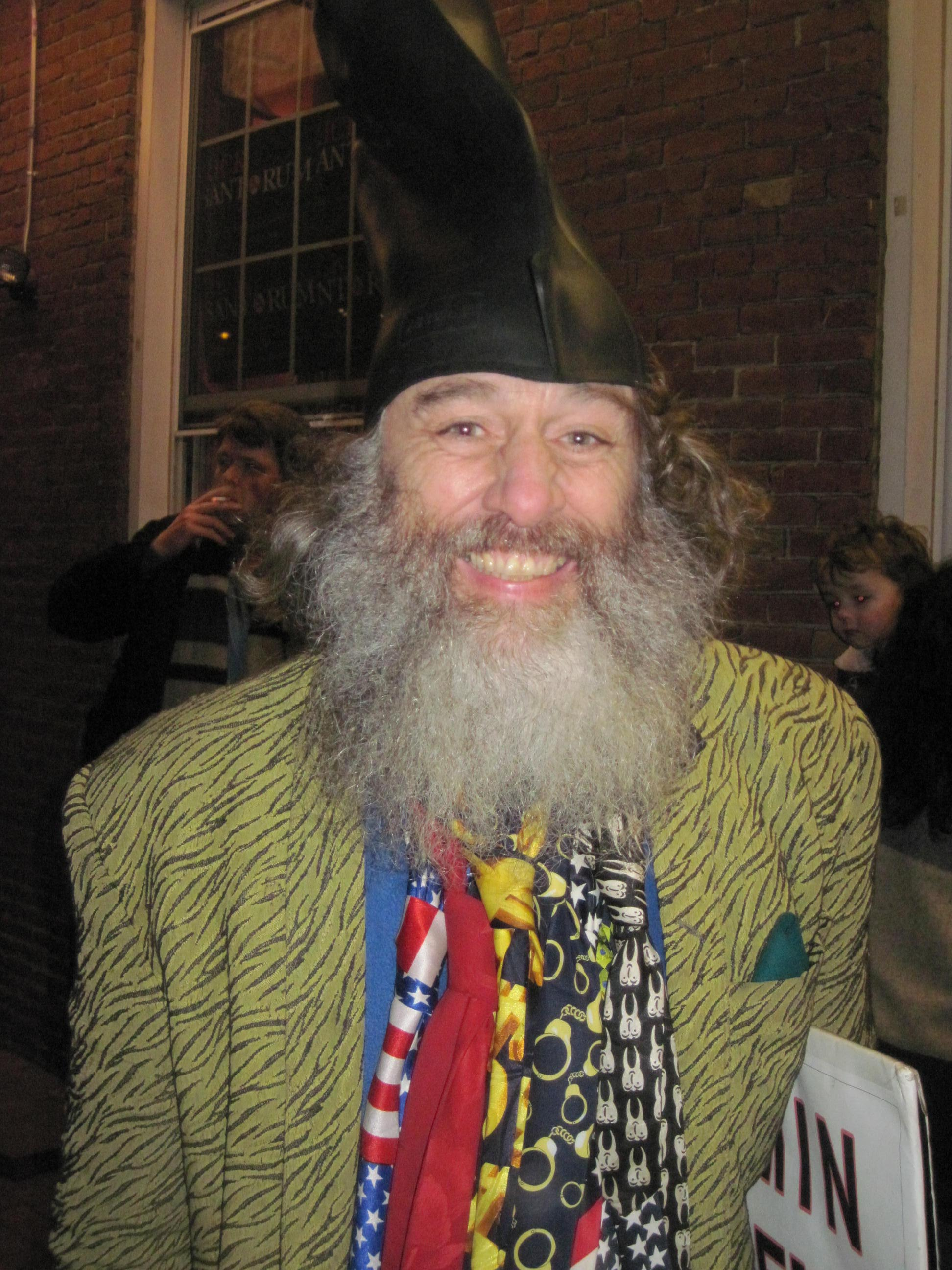

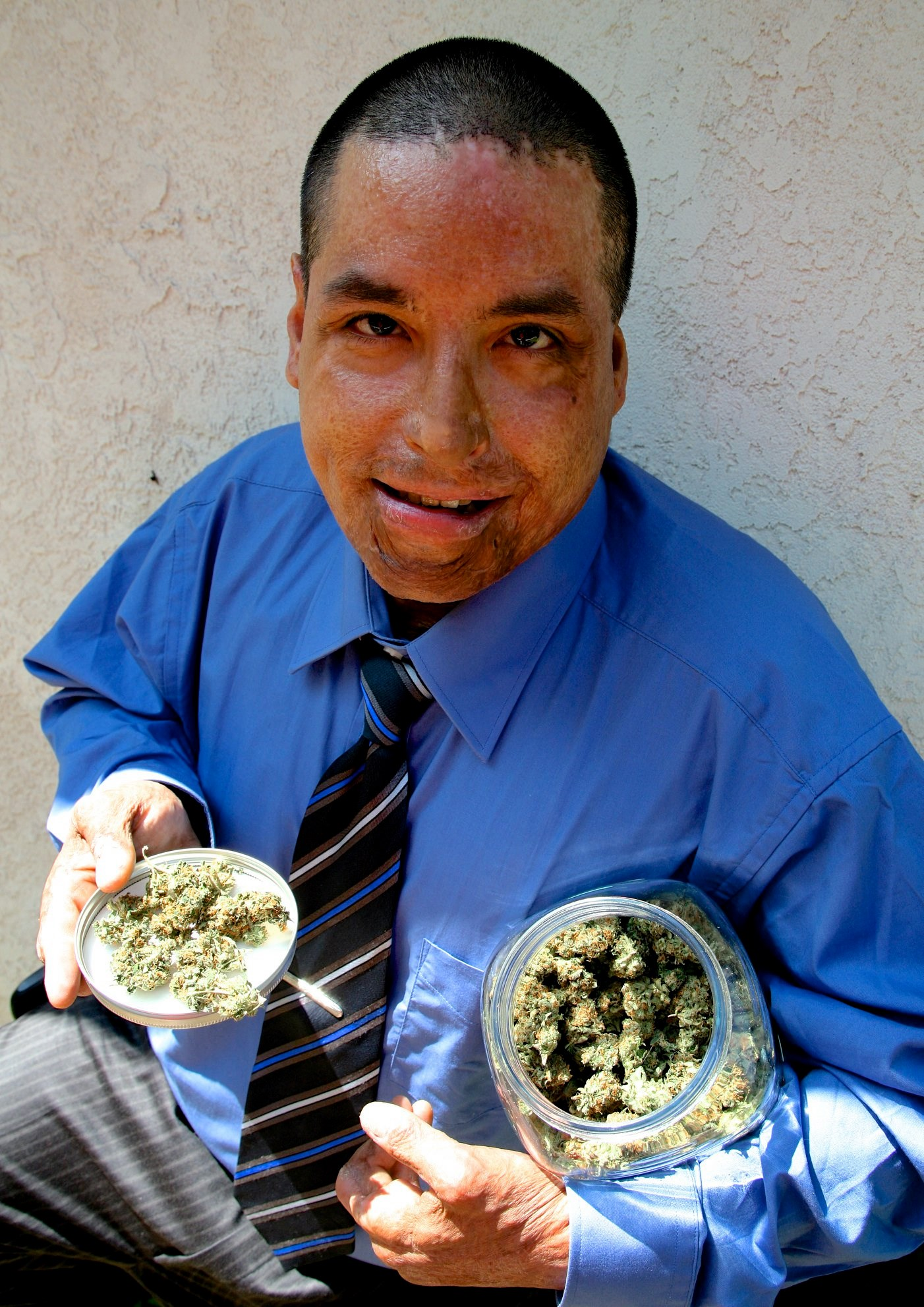

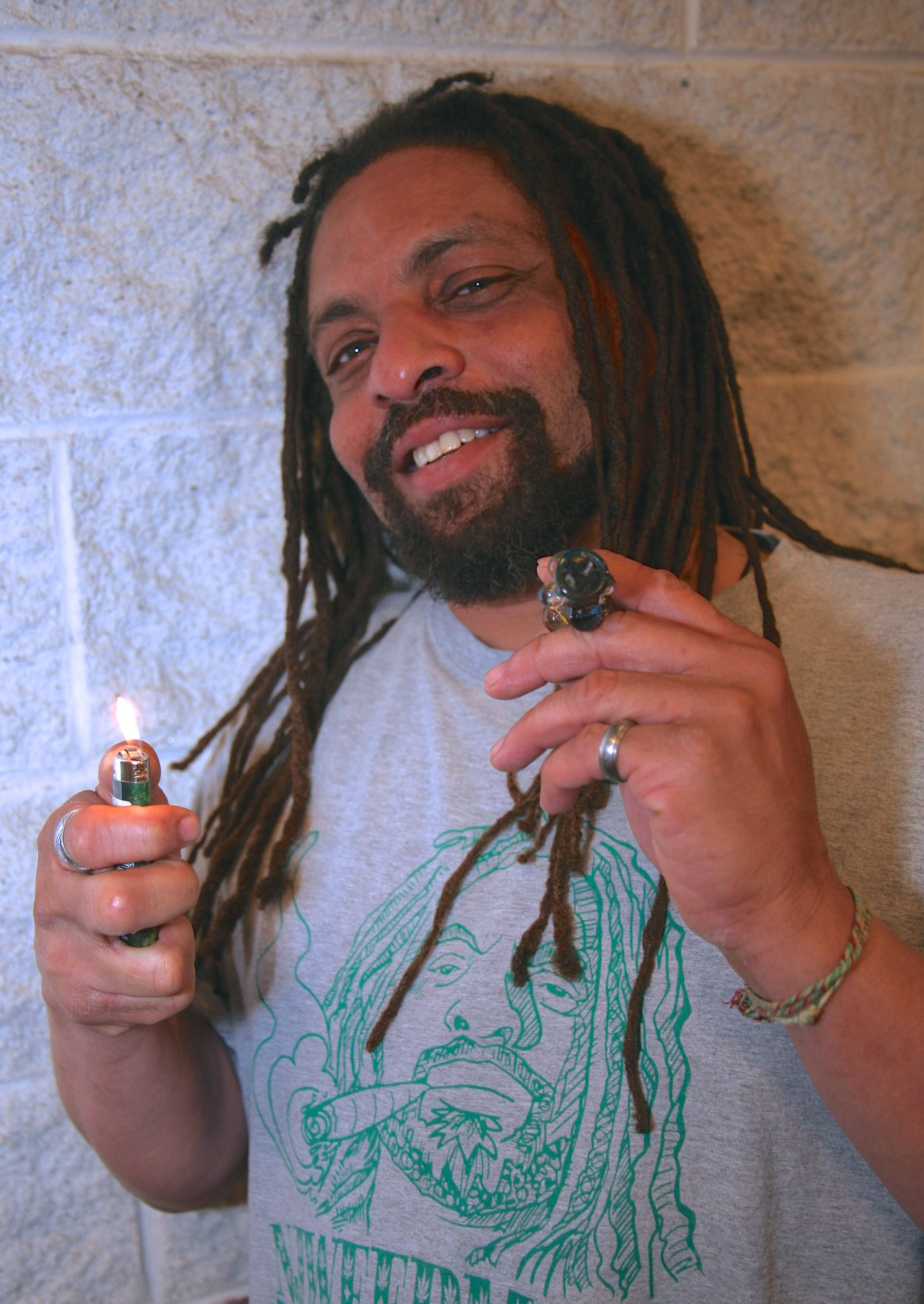

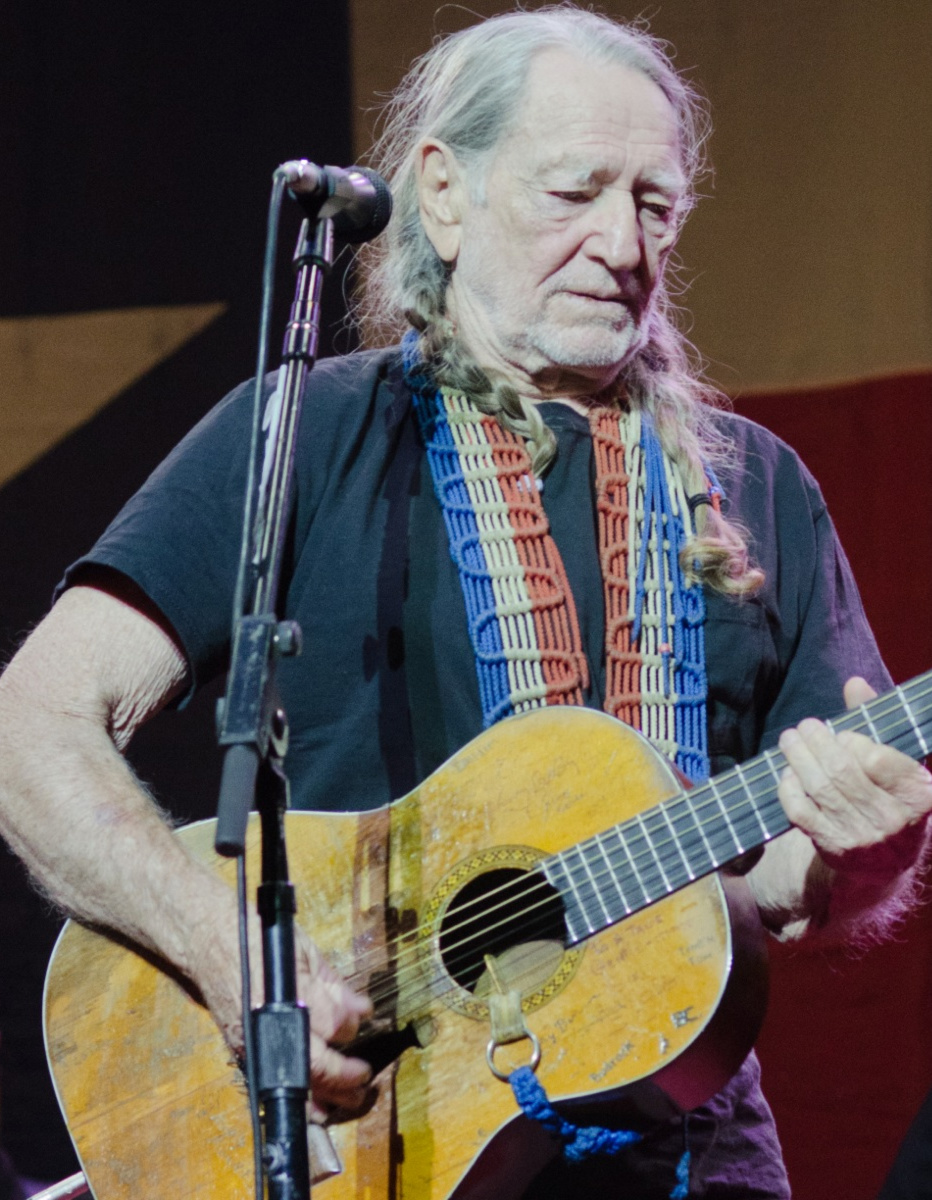
Candidate	Krystal Gabel (withdrawn)	Dennis Schuller	Vermin Supreme
Home state	Colorado	Minnesota	Massachusetts
Delegate count	-	7	6
Popular vote	759	459	397
Percentage	28.8%	17.4%	15.1%
Candidate	Rudy Reyes	Edward Forchion	Willie Nelson (write-in)
Home state	California	New Jersey	Texas
Delegate count	5	2	0
Popular vote	365	168	19
Percentage	13.9%	6.4%	0.7%

The 2024 Minnesota Legal Marijuana Now presidential primary took place on March 5, 2024, for the 2024 presidential election. The contest was held on Super Tuesday alongside primaries in 14 other states and territories. The race was the first Legal Marijuana Now Party presidential primary, and the first third party presidential primary run by the state of Minnesota since 1916. Krystal Gabel, an activist from Colorado, earned a plurality of votes in the election, despite having withdrawn from the race, asking people to not vote for her.

== Candidates ==
The following candidates appeared on the ballot:

- Edward Forchion, activist and candidate for governor of New Jersey in 2021
- Krystal Gabel, activist and candidate for governor of Nebraska in 2018 (withdrew January 26, 2024)
- Rudy Reyes, archeologist and Legal Marijuana Now Party chairperson
- Dennis Schuller, Minnesota Legal Marijuana Now Party chairperson; former Richfield, Minnesota, municipal planning commission member (2008–2014)
- Vermin Supreme, performance artist, activist, and perennial candidate from Massachusetts; former Libertarian Party Judicial Committee member (2020–2022) (Also sought the 2024 Democratic nomination)

== Campaign ==
Krystal Gabel, who had been national chairperson of the Legal Marijuana Now Party from 2021 through 2023, withdrew from the race during the party's candidate filing discussions. In 2024, when Gabel asked to be removed from the ballot after early voting had started on January 19, the Minnesota Secretary of State's office stated that changes cannot be made to the list of candidates after being certified at the beginning of January, and Gabel's name remained on ballots.

=== Write-in ===
Of Minnesota's three major political parties, all of which included a write in option for their 2024 nominating primaries, only the Legal Marijuana Now party submitted a write in name to be counted, Willie Nelson, to the Secretary of State.

== Results ==
Though Krystal Gabel won the primary, due to her withdrawal, second-place winner Dennis Schuller was awarded the nomination. The party lost its ballot standing soon after the primary election in a court ruling on a challenge by the Minnesota Democratic Party. Schuller ran as a write-in candidate for president along with his running mate, Rudy Reyes.

Minnesota Legal Marijuana Now primary, March 5, 2024
Candidate	Votes	Percentage	Delegates				
Candidate	Votes	Percentage	Delegates	Krystal Gabel (withdrawn)	759	28.84%	-
Dennis Schuller	459	17.44%	7				
Vermin Supreme	397	15.08%	6				
Rudy Reyes	365	13.87%	5				
Edward Forchion	168	6.38%	2				
Willie Nelson (write-in)	19	0.72%	0				
Other write-ins	465	17.67%	-				
Total:	2,632	100.00%	20				

== See also ==
- 2024 Minnesota Democratic presidential primary
- 2024 Minnesota Republican presidential primary
- 2024 United States presidential election in Minnesota
- Third party and independent candidates for the 2024 United States presidential election
