= Timeline of the 2024 United States presidential election (Election Day) =

This article covers the events on Election Day in the United States as a subset of the timeline of the 2024 United States presidential election between Donald Trump (R) and Kamala Harris (D).

== Timeline ==
All times are listed according to the Eastern Time Zone.

=== November 5 ===
==== AM ====
- 12:07 AM: Polls close in the New Hampshire midnight voting. Voters in Dixville Notch voted 3-3 for Harris and Trump.

==== PM ====
- 6:00 PM: Polls close in parts of Kentucky and Indiana located in the Eastern Time Zone.
- 7:00 PM: Polls close in:
  - Parts of Florida located in the Eastern Time Zone.
  - Parts of Indiana located in the Central Time Zone.
  - Some parts of New Hampshire.
  - All of Georgia, South Carolina, Virginia, and Vermont.
- 7:30 PM: Polls close in North Carolina, Ohio, and West Virginia.
- 8:00 PM: Polls close in:
  - Parts of Florida, Kansas, North Dakota, South Dakota, and Texas located in the Central Time Zone.
  - Parts of Michigan located in the Eastern Time Zone.
  - All of Alabama, Connecticut, Delaware, Illinois, Maine, Maryland, Massachusetts, Mississippi, Missouri, New Hampshire, New Jersey, Oklahoma, Pennsylvania, Rhode Island, Tennessee, and Washington, D.C.
- 8:30 PM: Polls close in Arkansas.
- 9:00 PM: Polls close in:
  - Parts of Kansas, North Dakota, South Dakota, and Texas in the Mountain Time Zone.
  - Parts of Michigan in the Central Time Zone.
  - All of Arizona, Colorado, Iowa, Louisiana, Minnesota, Nebraska, New Mexico, New York, Wisconsin, and Wyoming.
- 10:00 PM: Polls close in:
  - Parts of Idaho and Oregon in the Mountain Time Zone.
  - All of Montana, Nevada, and Utah.
- 11:00 PM: Polls close in:
  - Parts of Idaho and Oregon in the Pacific Time Zone.
  - All of California and Washington.

=== November 6 ===
- 12:00 AM: Polls close in:
  - All of Hawaii.
  - Parts of Alaska in the Alaska Time Zone.
- 1:00 AM: Polls close in all of Alaska.
- 2:00AM: Donald Trump is projected to win the election.
