= 2024 Pennsylvania Democratic presidential primary =

- April 23, 2024

187 delegates (159 pledged and 28 unpledged) to the Democratic National Convention

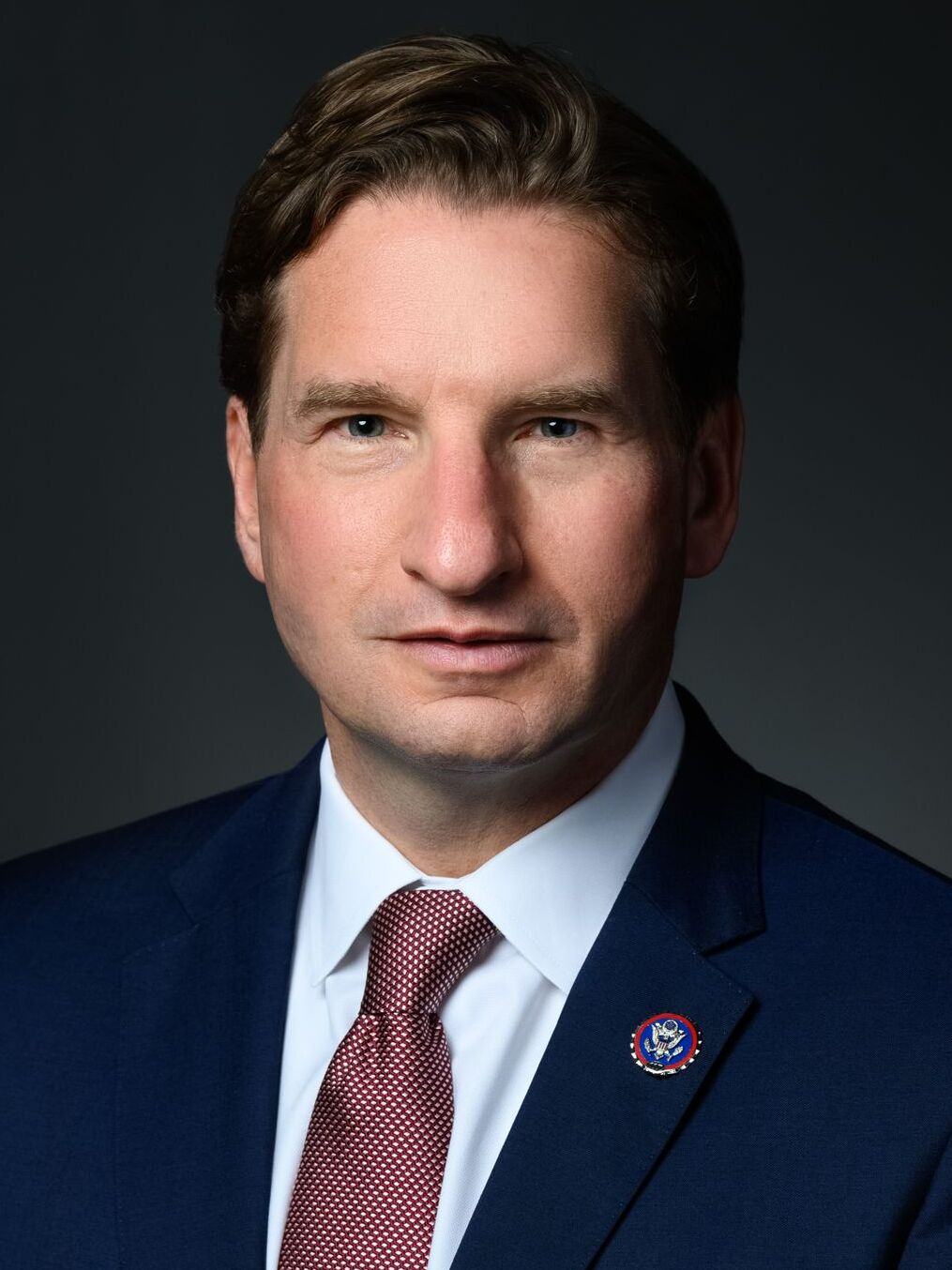
Candidate	Joe Biden	Dean Phillips (withdrawn)
Home state	Delaware	Minnesota
Delegate count	159	0
Popular vote	953,916	69,765
Percentage	87.9%	6.4%
County results
Biden
80–90%
>90%

The 2024 Pennsylvania Democratic presidential primary took place on April 23, 2024, as part of the Democratic Party primaries for the 2024 presidential election. 159 delegates to the Democratic National Convention were allocated in the closed primary, with additional 28 unpledged delegates.

Incumbent President Joe Biden ran for re-election at the time, but later withdrew and endorsed Vice President Kamala Harris. Dean Phillips, who had suspended his campaign on March 6, was the only other candidate on the ballot.

President Biden won all delegates with almost 88% of the vote, but protest votes for withdrawn candidate Phillips were at 6.4%, while write-in votes made up the rest of 5.6%.

== Candidates ==
Joe Biden announced his bid for a second term on April 25, 2023, four years after he announced his 2020 campaign. Dean Phillips also was still on the ballot and the only other candidate.

== Endorsements ==
Joe Biden

Federal executive officials

- Patrick Murphy, former U.S. Under Secretary of the Army (2016–2017)

U.S. representatives

- Brendan Boyle, U.S. representative from PA-02 (2015–present)
- Matt Cartwright, U.S. representative from PA-08 (2013-2025)
- Chrissy Houlahan, U.S. representative from PA-06 (2019–present)
- Susan Wild, U.S. representative from PA-07 (2018-2025)

Statewide officials

- Austin Davis, lieutenant governor of Pennsylvania (2023–present)
- Josh Shapiro, governor of Pennsylvania (2023–present) and former Pennsylvania Attorney General (2017–2023)

State legislators

- Malcolm Kenyatta, state representative from the 181st district (2019–present)
- Joanna McClinton, Speaker of the Pennsylvania House of Representatives (2023–present) from the 191st district (2015–present)
- Sharif Street, state senator from the 3rd district (2017–present)

Organizations

- Pennsylvania Democratic Party
Write-in "uncommitted" (invalid) (Note: Pennsylvania only accepts write-in votes with a first and last name.)

Organizations

- National organization of the Democratic Socialists of America

== Polling ==
Poll source	Date(s) administered	Sample size (Note: Key: A – all adults RV – registered voters LV – likely voters V – unclear)	Margin of error	Joe Biden	Robert F. Kennedy Jr.	Dean Phillips	Marianne Williamson	Other / Undecided
Quinnipiac University	Jan 4–8, 2024	746 (RV)	± 3.6%	77%	–	4%	12%	8% (Note: "Undecided" with 4%; "Wouldn't vote" with 3%; "Someone else" with 1%)
	October 27, 2023	Phillips declares his candidacy						
	October 9, 2023	Kennedy withdraws from the primaries						
Quinnipiac University	Sep 28 – October 2, 2023	759 (RV)	± 3.6%	70%	17%	–	5%	8%
Susquehanna Polling & Research	Sep 19–28, 2023	294 (RV)	–	70%	14%	–	1%	15%
Quinnipiac University	June 22–26, 2023	664 (RV)	± 3.8%	71%	17%	–	5%	7%

== Results ==
A comparison of results between Biden and Trump

Pennsylvania Democratic primary, April 23, 2024
Candidate	Votes	%	Delegates
Joe Biden (incumbent)	953,916	87.93	159
Dean Phillips (withdrawn)	69,765	6.43	0
Write-in votes	61,136	5.64	—
Total	1,084,817	100%	159

== See also ==
- 2024 Pennsylvania Republican presidential primary
- 2024 Democratic Party presidential primaries
- 2024 United States presidential election in Pennsylvania
