= 2024 Minnesota Republican presidential primary =

- March 5, 2024

39 Republican National Convention delegates

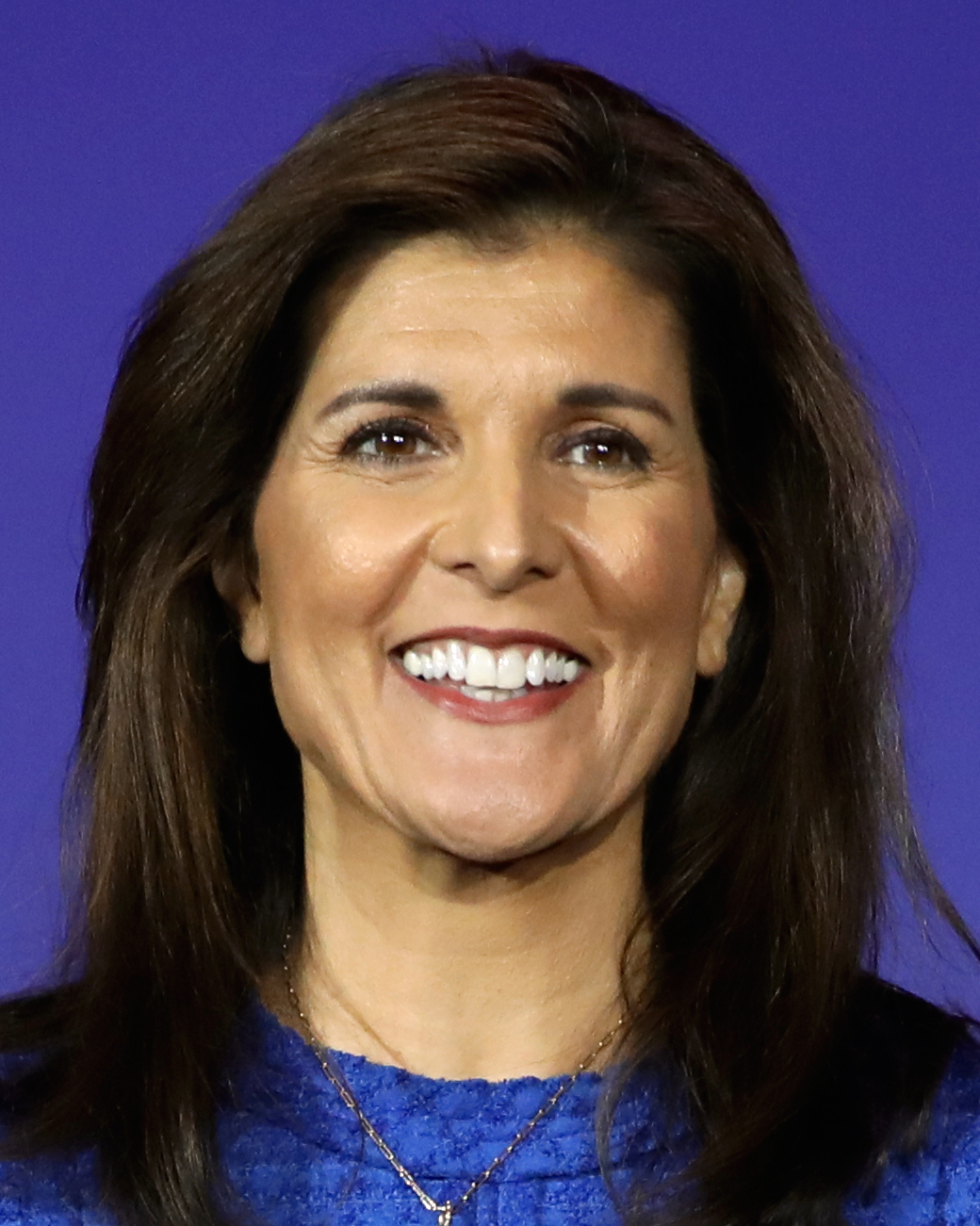
Candidate	Donald Trump	Nikki Haley
Home state	Florida	South Carolina
Delegate count	27	12
Popular vote	232,846	97,182
Percentage	68.94%	28.77%

Trump
40 – 50%
50 – 60%
60 – 70%
70 – 80%
80 – 90%
80 – 90%
>90%
Haley
40 – 50%
50 – 60%
60 – 70%
70 – 80%
80 – 90%
DeSantis
100%
Tie/no votes
40 – 50%
50%
No votes

The 2024 Minnesota Republican presidential primary was held on March 5, 2024, as part of the Republican Party primaries for the 2024 presidential election. 39 delegates to the 2024 Republican National Convention were allocated on a winner-take-all basis. The contest was held on Super Tuesday alongside primaries in 14 other states.

Trump won more than two thirds of the popular vote and swept every county in the state. Conversely, Haley performed best in the Hennepin and Ramsey counties, where the Twin Cities of Minneapolis and Saint Paul are respectively located.

== Candidates ==
The following candidates were on the ballot. A write-in option was available.

- Chris Christie
- Ron DeSantis
- Nikki Haley
- Vivek Ramaswamy
- Donald Trump

== Endorsements ==
Donald J. Trump

U.S. representatives

- Tom Emmer, MN-06 (2015–present) and House Majority Whip (2023–present)
- Brad Finstad, MN-01 (2022–present)
- Michelle Fischbach, MN-07 (2021–present)
- Jason Lewis, MN-02 (2017–2019)
- Pete Stauber, MN-08 (2019–present)

State senators

- Nathan Wesenberg, state senator for District 10

State representatives

- Ben Davis, state representative for District 6A

Individuals

- Mike Lindell, MyPillow CEO
- Royce White, former professional basketball player and Republican candidate for U.S. senator from Minnesota in 2024
Ron DeSantis (withdrawn)

State representatives

- Elliott Engen, state representative for District 36A

== Results ==
Minnesota Republican primary, March 5, 2024
Candidate	Votes	Percentage	Actual delegate count		
Candidate	Votes	Percentage	Bound	Unbound	Total
Donald Trump	232,846	68.94%	27	0	27
Nikki Haley	97,182	28.77%	12	0	12
Ron DeSantis (withdrawn)	4,085	1.21%	0	0	0
Vivek Ramaswamy (withdrawn)	1,470	0.44%	0	0	0
Chris Christie (withdrawn)	1,431	0.42%	0	0	0
Write-ins	720	0.21%	0	0	0
Total:	337,014	100.00%	39	0	39

=== Results by congressional district ===
Trump won seven of eight congressional districts.

District	Trump	Haley
1st	71.7%	25.8%
2nd	66.8%	31.0%
3rd	58.2%	39.6%
4th	55.5%	41.9%
5th	47.1%	50.0%
6th	73.2%	24.7%
7th	78.2%	19.5%
8th	76.9%	20.9%
Source: "Summary Level Results by Congressional District".

== Polling ==
Poll source	Date(s) administered	Sample size (Note: Key: A – all adults RV – registered voters LV – likely voters V – unclear)	Margin of error	Doug Burgum	Chris Christie	Ron DeSantis	Nikki Haley	Vivek Ramaswamy	Donald J. Trump	Other	Undecided
Embold Research/MinnPost	November 14–17, 2023	1,519 (LV)	± 2.6%	1%	1%	17%	12%	4%	60%	–	5%

== See also ==
- 2024 Minnesota Democratic presidential primary
- 2024 Minnesota Legal Marijuana Now presidential primary
- 2024 Republican Party presidential primaries
- 2024 United States presidential election
- 2024 United States presidential election in Minnesota
- 2024 United States elections

== Notes ==
Partisan clients
