= 2024 Pennsylvania Republican presidential primary =

- April 23, 2024

67 Republican National Convention delegates
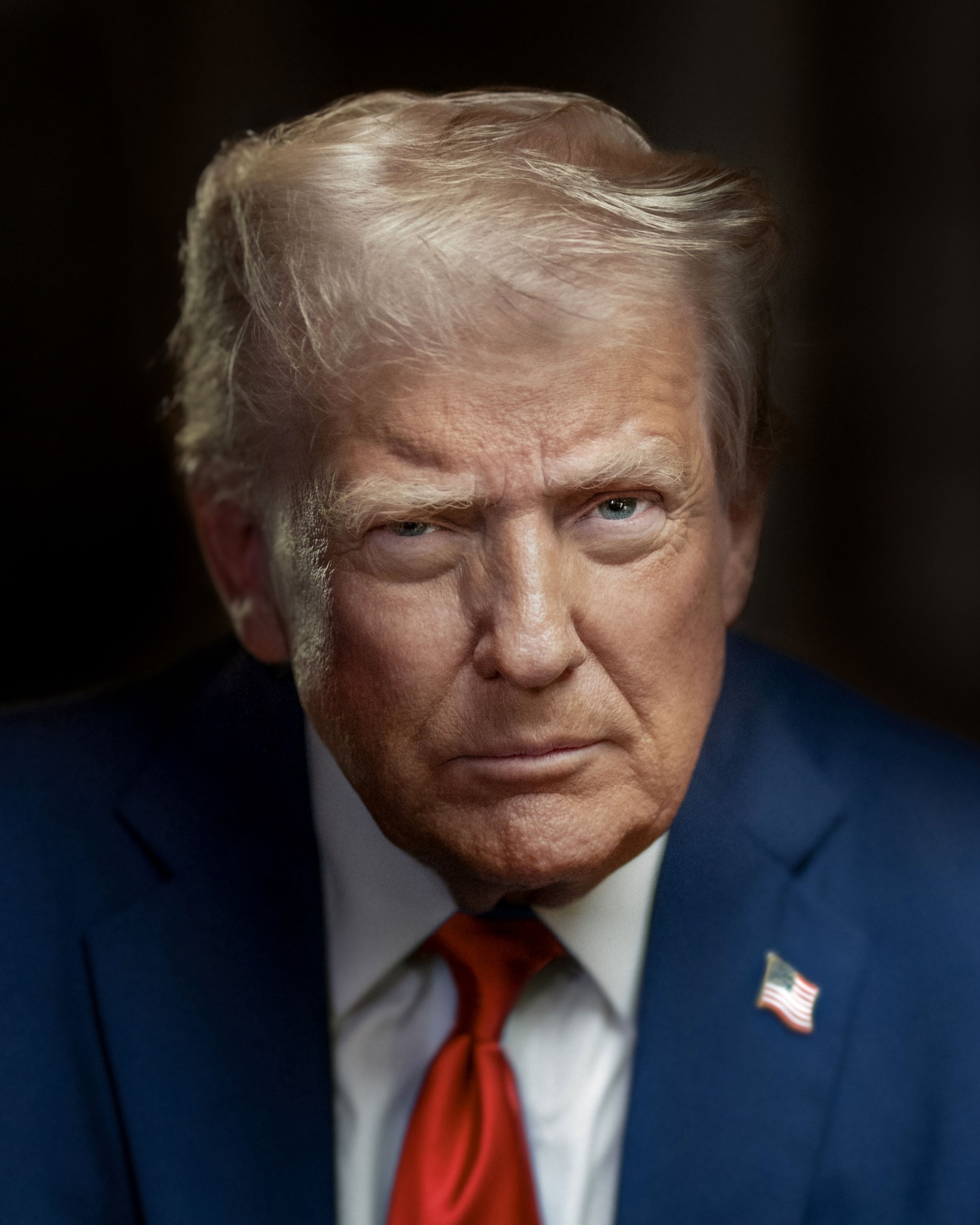

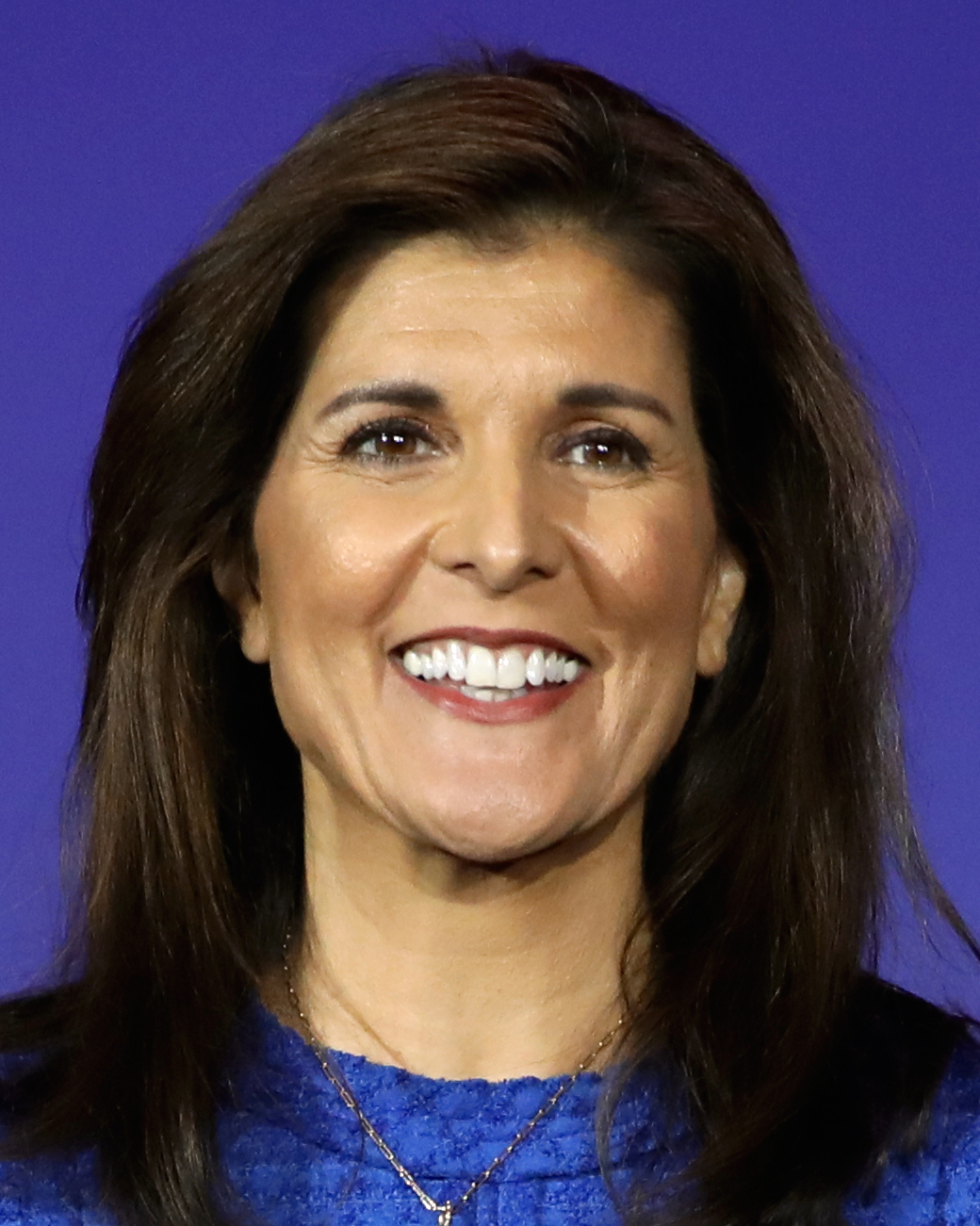
Candidate	Donald Trump	Nikki Haley (withdrawn)
Home state	Florida	South Carolina
Delegate count	67	0
Popular vote	794,048	158,672
Percentage	83.35%	16.65%
County results
Trump
70–80%
80–90%
>90%

The 2024 Pennsylvania Republican presidential primary was held on April 23, 2024, as part of the Republican Party primaries for the 2024 presidential election. 67 delegates to the 2024 Republican National Convention were allocated.

== Endorsements ==
Ron DeSantis (withdrawn)

U.S. Representatives

- Lou Barletta, PA-11 (2011–2019); candidate for U.S. Senator in 2018
- Tom Marino, PA-12 (2019) and PA-10 (2011–2019)
- Keith Rothfus, PA-12 (2013–2019)

State senators

- Greg Rothman, 34th district (2023-present); state representative for the 87th district (2015-2022)
Nikki Haley (withdrawn)

State representatives

- Bryan Cutler, Pennsylvania House Minority Leader (2023–present) from District 100 (2007–present) and former Speaker (2020–2022) and Majority Leader (2022–2023)
Vivek Ramaswamy (withdrawn)

Notable individual

- Kathy Barnette, political commentator; candidate for U.S. Senator from Pennsylvania in 2022; Republican nominee for U.S. Representative from PA-04 in 2020
Donald Trump

Federal executive officials

- Jeffrey Lord, White House Associate Political Director (1987–1988)
- David McCormick, Under Secretary of the Treasury for International Affairs (2007–2009), Deputy National Security Advisor for International Economic Affairs (2006–2007), and Under Secretary of Commerce for Industry and Security (2005–2006) (previously declined to endorse)
- Carla Sands, U.S. Ambassador to Denmark (2017–2021)

Statewide officials

- Stacy Garrity, Pennsylvania State Treasurer (2021-present)

U.S. Representatives

- John Joyce, PA-13 (2019–present)
- Fred Keller, PA-12 (2019–2023)
- Mike Kelly, PA-16 (2019–present) and PA-03 (2011–2019)
- Dan Meuser, PA-09 (2019–present)
- Scott Perry, PA-10 (2019–present) and PA-04 (2013–2019) and Chair of the House Freedom Caucus (2022–2024)
- Glenn Thompson, PA-15 (2019–present) and PA-05 (2009–2019)
- Guy Reschenthaler, PA-14 (2019–present)
- Lloyd Smucker, PA-11 (2019–present) and PA-16 (2017–2019)

State representatives

- Mike Cabell, 117th district (2023–2024)
- Ryan Mackenzie, 134th (2012-2022), 187th district (2023-2024)

== Results ==
Pennsylvania Republican primary, April 23, 2024
Candidate	Votes	Percentage	Actual delegate count		
Candidate	Votes	Percentage	Bound	Unbound	Total
Donald Trump	794,048	83.35%	16	46	67
Nikki Haley (withdrawn)	158,672	16.65%			
Unprojected delegates:				5	
Total:	952,720	100.00%	16	51	67

== Polling ==
Poll source	Date(s) administered	Sample size (Note: Key: A – all adults RV – registered voters LV – likely voters V – unclear)	Margin of error	Chris Christie	Ron DeSantis	Nikki Haley	Asa Hutchinson	Mike Pence	Vivek Ramaswamy	Tim Scott	Donald Trump	Other	Undecided
Quinnipiac University	Jan 4–8, 2024	651 (RV)	± 3.8%	6%	10%	14%	–	–	4%	–	61%	2% (Note: "Someone else" & "Wouldn't vote" with 1%)	3%
Morning Consult	Nov 1–30, 2023	2,056 (LV)	–	4%	14%	9%	0%	–	6%	1%	63%	0% (Note: Doug Burgum with 0%)	3%
Morning Consult	Oct 1–31, 2023	2,009 (LV)	–	4%	15%	7%	0%	6%	7%	1%	59%	0% (Note: Doug Burgum and Will Hurd with 0%)	1%
Franklin & Marshall College	Oct 11–22, 2023	359 (RV)	± 6.4%	4%	14%	9%	0%	2%	5%	3%	55%	2% (Note: "Someone else" with 2%; Doug Burgum, Will Hurd & Francis Suarez with 0%)	7%
Quinnipiac University	Sep 28 – Oct 2, 2023	711 (RV)	± 3.7%	4%	14%	8%	0%	4%	2%	1%	61%	3% (Note: Doug Burgum, "Wouldn't vote" & "Refused" with 1%; Larry Elder, Will Hurd with 0%)	3%
Morning Consult	Sep 1–30, 2023	1,910 (LV)	–	3%	14%	6%	0%	8%	8%	1%	58%	0% (Note: Doug Burgum and Will Hurd with 0%)	2%
Morning Consult	Aug 1–31, 2023	1,979 (LV)	–	4%	15%	3%	0%	8%	8%	2%	58%	0% (Note: Doug Burgum, Will Hurd, and Francis Suarez with 0%)	2%
Franklin & Marshall College	Aug 9–20, 2023	297 (RV)	± 7.0%	3%	21%	5%	1%	6%	9%	6%	39%	5% (Note: "Someone else" with 3%; Francis Suarez with 1%; Doug Burgum & Will Hurd with 0%)	8%
Morning Consult	July 1–31, 2023	2,139 (LV)	–	4%	20%	3%	0%	7%	7%	3%	55%	1% (Note: Francis Suarez with 1%; Doug Burgum, and Will Hurd with 0%)	–
Morning Consult	June 1–30, 2023	2,136 (LV)	–	3%	23%	3%	1%	9%	3%	3%	54%	1% (Note: Liz Cheney with 1%; Greg Abbott, Doug Burgum, and Kristi Noem with 0%)	–
Quinnipiac University	Jun 22–26, 2023	614 (RV)	± 4.0%	5%	25%	4%	–	5%	1%	4%	49%	–	6%
Morning Consult	May 1–31, 2023	2,062 (LV)	–	–	22%	4%	0%	7%	3%	2%	58%	4% (Note: Liz Cheney with 3%; Greg Abbott with 1%; Kristi Noem and Glenn Youngkin with 0%)	–
Morning Consult	Apr 1–30, 2023	2,058 (LV)	–	–	25%	3%	0%	9%	2%	2%	53%	6% (Note: Liz Cheney with 3%; Greg Abbott, Mike Pompeo, and Glenn Youngkin with 1%; Kristi Noem with 0%)	–
Franklin & Marshall College	Mar 27 – Apr 7, 2023	227 (RV)	± 4.9%	–	34%	4%	–	6%	–	0%	40%	6% (Note: Chris Sununu with 2%; Mike Pompeo with 0%; "Someone else" with 4%)	11%
Morning Consult	Mar 1–31, 2023	2,103 (LV)	–	–	30%	4%	–	8%	0%	1%	51%	4% (Note: Liz Cheney with 4%; Greg Abbott, Kristi Noem, Mike Pompeo, and Glenn Youngkin with 0%)	2%
Public Policy Polling	Mar 9–10, 2023	616 (LV)	–	–	31%	5%	–	5%	–	–	49%	–	10%
Public Policy Polling	Mar 9–10, 2023	616 (LV)	–	–	40%	–	–	–	–	–	48%	–	13%
Morning Consult	Feb 1–28, 2023	1,769 (LV)	–	–	32%	4%	–	8%	0%	1%	46%	8% (Note: Liz Cheney with 3%; Ted Cruz and Mike Pompeo with 2%; Greg Abbott with 1%; Kristi Noem and Glenn Youngkin with 0%)	1%
Susquehanna Polling & Research	Feb 19–26, 2023	320 (RV)	± 3.2%	–	37%	4%	–	2%	–	1%	32%	27% (Note: Ted Cruz with 2%; Mike Pompeo with 1%; Marco Rubio with 0%; "Someone else" with 24%)	–
Morning Consult	Jan 1–31, 2023	2,470 (LV)	–	–	35%	2%	–	10%	–	1%	43%	9% (Note: Liz Cheney with 4%; Ted Cruz with 2%; Greg Abbott, Kristi Noem, and Mike Pompeo with 1%; Glenn Youngkin with 0%)	–
Morning Consult	Dec 1–31, 2022	1,381 (LV)	–	–	34%	2%	–	10%	–	1%	44%	8% (Note: Liz Cheney with 4%; Ted Cruz with 3%; Greg Abbott with 1%; Kristi Noem, Mike Pompeo, and Glenn Youngkin with 0%)	1%
Communication Concepts	Nov 19–21, 2022	639 (RV)	± 3.9%	–	45%	–	–	–	–	–	40%	4%	12%
Echelon Insights	Aug 31 – Sep 7, 2022	353 (LV)	–	–	40%	–	–	–	–	–	48%	12%	–
John Bolton Super PAC	Jul 22–24, 2022	129 (LV)	–	2%	29%	–	–	7%	–	–	40%	10% (Note: Liz Cheney with 6%; Ted Cruz, Marco Rubio with 2%; Mike Pompeo with 0%; "Someone else" with 12%)	–

== See also ==
- 2024 Republican Party presidential primaries
- 2024 United States presidential election
- 2024 United States presidential election in Pennsylvania
- 2024 United States elections
- 2024 Pennsylvania Democratic presidential primary
