= 2024 Minnesota Democratic presidential primary =

- March 5, 2024

93 delegates (75 pledged, 18 unpledged) to the Democratic National Convention

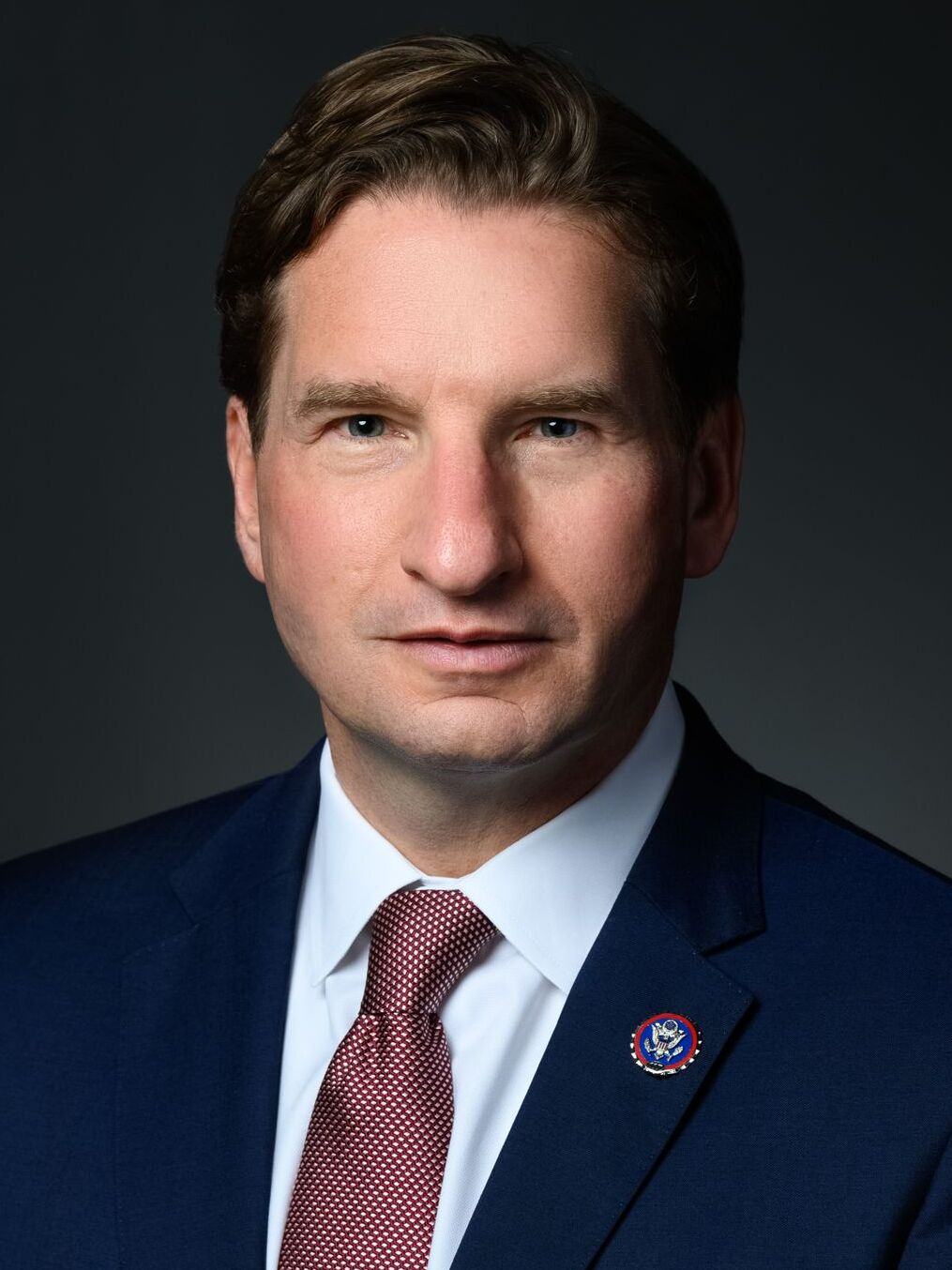
Candidate	Joe Biden	Uncommitted	Dean Phillips
Home state	Delaware	–	Minnesota
Delegate count	64	11	0
Popular vote	171,278	45,914	18,960
Percentage	70.1%	18.8%	7.8%

Biden
30–40%
40–50%
50–60%
60–70%
70–80%
80–90%
90–100%
Uncommitted
30–40%
40–50%
50–60%
60–70%
70–80%
80–90%
90–100%
Phillips
40–50%
50–60%
60–70%
70–80%
90–100%
Williamson
60–70%
90–100%
Write-ins
90–100%
Palmer
90–100%
Uygur
90–100%
Cambridge
90–100%
Other
20–30% tie
30–40% tie
40–50% tie
50% tie
No votes

The 2024 Minnesota Democratic presidential primary took place on March 5, 2024, as part of the Democratic Party primaries for the 2024 presidential election. 75 delegates to the Democratic National Convention were allocated, with 18 additional unpledged delegates. The contest was held on Super Tuesday alongside primaries in 14 other states and territories.

President Joe Biden won the primary with a reduced margin, but the campaign for "uncommitted" delegates by the Uncommitted National Movement earned a significant percentage of 18.8%, which was rewarded with 11 delegates on the state and district levels. It was the second highest success for Uncommitted throughout the primaries, while Biden's percentage of just over 70% was his third lowest result.

U.S. Representative Dean Philips of Minnesota received fewer than 8% of votes in the state he represented in Congress and, while doing better in some districts, failed to win any delegates in the state. On March 6, 2024, Phillips dropped out and endorsed Biden.

== Candidates ==
The following candidates were submitted to the Secretary of State by DFL Chair Ken Martin:

- Joe Biden
- Eban Cambridge
- Gabriel Cornejo
- Frankie Lozada
- Jason Palmer
- Armando "Mando" Perez-Serrato
- Dean Phillips
- Cenk Uygur
- Marianne Williamson

Additionally, an option for uncommitted delegates appeared on the ballot.

== Endorsements ==
Joe Biden

U.S. senators

- Amy Klobuchar, U.S. senator from Minnesota (2007–present), candidate for president in 2020
- Tina Smith, U.S. senator from Minnesota (2018–present), 48th lieutenant governor of Minnesota (2015–2018)

U.S. representatives

- Angie Craig, U.S. representative from MN-02 (2019–present)
- Ilhan Omar, U.S. representative from MN-05 (2019–present)

Statewide officials

- Tim Walz, governor of Minnesota (2019–present); U.S. representative for MN-01 (2007–2019)

Party officials

- Ken Martin, chair of the Minnesota Democratic–Farmer–Labor Party (2011–present), vice chair of the Democratic National Committee (2021–present)
Uncommitted

State senators

- Omar Fateh, senator from SD-62 (2021–present)
- Jen McEwen, senator from SD-08 (2021–present)

State representatives

- Aisha Gomez, state representative from HD-62A (2019–present)
- Hodan Hassan, state representative from HD-62B (2019–present)
- Samantha Sencer-Mura, state representative from HD-63A (2023–present)
- Andy Smith, state representative from HD-25B (2023–present)
- Jay Xiong, state representative from HD-67B (2019–present)

City councilmembers

- Azrin Awal, Duluth City Councilor at-large (2022–present)
- Aisha Chughtai, Minneapolis City Councilmember from Ward 10 (2022–present)
- Wendy Durrwachter, Duluth City Councilor from District 1 (2024–present)
- Mitra Jalali, Saint Paul City Councilmember from Ward 4 (2018–present), city council president (2024–present)
- Nelsie Yang, Saint Paul City Councilmember from Ward 6 (2020–present)

Organizations

- Council on American–Islamic Relations in Minnesota
- National organization and Twin Cities chapter of the Democratic Socialists of America
- Jewish Voice for Peace Action
- TakeAction Minnesota

== Results ==
2024 Minnesota Democratic pres. primary
Candidate	Votes	%	Delegates
Joe Biden (incumbent)	171,278	70.12	64
Uncommitted	45,914	18.80	11
Dean Phillips	18,960	7.76	0
Marianne Williamson	3,459	1.42	0
Jason Palmer	758	0.31	0
Cenk Uygur	692	0.28	0
Armando Perez-Serrato	372	0.15	0
Gabriel Cornejo	323	0.13	0
Frankie Lozada	290	0.12	0
Eban Cambridge	235	0.10	0
Write-in votes	2,000	0.82	—
Total	244,281	100%	75

=== Results by congressional district ===
5th congressional district by precinct Biden—90–100% Biden—70–80% Biden—60–70% Biden—50–60% Biden—40–50% Uncommitted—50–60% Uncommitted—60–70% Uncommitted—70–80% Uncommitted—80–90%

Biden carried all the state's eight congressional districts. He recorded his best result in the eighth district while underperforming heavily in the urban fifth district. It is represented by progressive Democrat Ilhan Omar, who supported a ceasefire in the Gaza war, but backed Biden in the primary. The district saw almost a third of votes cast for uncommitted.

Phillips trailed considerably, but managed to earn a higher result than uncommitted in the third (which he represented in Congress) and seventh districts. Meanwhile, Williamson performed poorly, with the strongest showing of just 1.88% in the seventh district.

District	Biden	Uncommitted	Phillips	Williamson
1st	77.98%	12.01%	5.88%	1.79%
2nd	71.75%	16.14%	8.32%	1.58%
3rd	69.95%	13.7%	13.95%	0.97%
4th	69.75%	21.3%	5.78%	1.26%
5th	59.36%	31.59%	6.09%	1.32%
6th	70.93%	14.64%	10.62%	1.75%
7th	79.03%	8.23%	8.43%	1.88%
8th	79.75%	11.02%	5.65%	1.46%

== See also ==
- 2024 Minnesota Republican presidential primary
- 2024 Minnesota Legal Marijuana Now presidential primary
- 2024 Democratic Party presidential primaries
- 2024 United States presidential election
- 2024 United States presidential election in Minnesota
- 2024 United States elections
