= 2024 Iowa Democratic presidential caucuses =

- January 12 – March 5, 2024

46 delegates (40 pledged, 6 unpledged) to the Democratic National Convention

Candidate	Joe Biden	Uncommitted
Home state	Delaware	–
Delegate count	40	0
Popular vote	12,337	614
Percentage	90.3%	4.5%
Results by county
Biden
60–70%
70–80%
80–90%
>90%

The 2024 Iowa Democratic presidential caucuses were held as part of the Democratic Party primaries for the 2024 presidential election. 40 delegates to the Democratic National Convention were allocated, with 6 additional unpledged delegates.

In this cycle, in-person caucuses focusing only on party business were held on January 15, but voting on candidates was being done exclusively via mail-in ballots from January 12 until Super Tuesday, March 5, 2024. This was the result of a compromise between the Iowa Democratic Party and the Democratic National Committee (DNC). Iowa traditionally holds its race first during the presidential primary and caucuses season, but the DNC wanted South Carolina to instead hold its race first.

Incumbent President Joe Biden announced his bid for a second term on April 25, 2023. He faced a primary challenge from author, progressive activist, and 2020 presidential candidate Marianne Williamson, and Representative Dean Phillips. All three candidates filed to appear on the mail-in ballot and were certified by the filing deadline on December 1, 2023 – along with a choice to vote for "Uncommitted". Joe Biden won the primary, along with all 40 pledged delegates.

== Scheduling controversy ==
President Joe Biden sent a letter on December 1, 2022, to the Democratic National Committee (DNC), requesting that "diversity" should be emphasized in the 2024 Democratic Party presidential primaries, shifting Iowa's traditional status of the first state to hold a caucus. A December 2022 vote by the DNC Rules and Bylaws Committee the following day approved the change.

On February 4, 2023, the DNC approved a new 2024 primary calendar, moving South Carolina to hold its race first on February 3. Iowa, which traditionally goes first, would then be held later in the primary season. Members of the Iowa Democratic Party and the New Hampshire Democratic Party opposed the move, since they would no longer be the first two states to hold their races. Lee Saunders, a member of the Rules and Bylaws Committee who was in favor of the change, said that adjusting the calendar will give a truer representation of the composition of the country.

Under normal circumstances, the Iowa caucuses operate very differently from primary elections used in most other U.S. states. Instead of going to polling places to cast ballots, Iowans instead gather in-person at local caucus meetings to discuss and vote on the candidates, which are typically held at selected schools, churches, public libraries, or even individuals' houses. In response to the chaotic 2020 Iowa caucuses and the DNC's new rules and calendar, the Iowa Democratic Party initially planned to allow voting-by-mail for the first time, hoping to gain a better spot on the primary calendar through closely abiding by the new rules and enlarging their voter base. They speculated that in doing so they could take the spot of another planned early state that would have failed to meet the date expected by the DNC. However, in early June 2023, the Republican-controlled state legislature and Iowa Governor Kim Reynolds signed a new bill into law requiring the caucuses to be held in person in order to force Iowa Democrats not to follow the DNC plan and to secure Iowa's first-in-the-nation status. Iowa Democrats then wanted to hold the caucus in person, select delegates and complete party business, fulfilling the law, while they would still organize the presidential preference vote by mail-in cards and only declare the official results during the later timeframe sanctioned by the DNC.

However, on October 6, the DNC and the Iowa Democratic Party reached a different compromise in which the in-person caucuses could still be held in January, but delegate-determining voting were held through the mail until Super Tuesday, March 5.

== Opinion polling ==
Poll source	Date(s) administered	Sample size (Note: Key: A – all adults RV – registered voters LV – likely voters V – unclear)	Margin of error	Joe Biden	Robert F. Kennedy Jr.	Dean Phillips	Marianne Williamson	Other	Undecided
	February 28, 2024	Williamson re-launches her candidacy							
	February 7, 2024	Williamson suspends her candidacy							
Emerson College	Jan 11–13, 2024	367 (LV)	± 5.1%	72%	–	2%	5%	–	21%
Emerson College	Dec 15–17, 2023	263 (LV)	± 6.0%	69%	–	1%	5%	–	24%
	October 27, 2023	Phillips declares his candidacy							
	October 9, 2023	Kennedy withdraws from the primaries							
Emerson College	Sept 7–9, 2023	273 (LV)	± 5.9%	50%	9%	–	7%	–	34%
HarrisX	Aug 17–21, 2023	784 (LV)	–	47%	19%	–	7%	12%	16%
Emerson College	May 19–22, 2023	301 (LV)	± 5.6%	69%	11%	–	10%	10%	–
Victory Insights	April 8, 2021	600 (RV)	± 4.2%	63%	–	–	–	11%	26%

Hypothetical polling

Poll source	Date(s) administered	Sample size	Margin of error	Pete Buttigieg	Kamala Harris	John Kerry	Amy Klobuchar	Michelle Obama	Alexandria Ocasio-Cortez	Bernie Sanders	Elizabeth Warren	Other	Undecided
Victory Insights	April 8, 2021	600 (V)	–	15%	28%	7%	9%	12%	2%	2%	3%	5%	16%

== Results ==
2024 Iowa Democratic pres. caucuses
Candidate	Votes	%	Delegates
Joe Biden (incumbent)	12,337	90.26	40
Dean Phillips	394	2.88	0
Marianne Williamson (Note: While voting was ongoing, Williamson suspended and then unsuspended her campaign.)	307	2.25	0
Uncommitted	614	4.49	0
Over and under votes	17	0.12	—
Total	13,669	100%	40

== See also ==
- 2024 Iowa Republican presidential caucuses
- 2024 Democratic Party presidential primaries
- 2024 United States presidential election
- 2024 United States presidential election in Iowa
- 2024 United States elections
