= Opinion polling for the 2024 Democratic Party presidential primaries =

This is a list of nationwide public opinion polls that were conducted relating to the Democratic primaries for the 2024 United States presidential election. The persons named in the polls were declared candidates or had received media speculation about their possible candidacy. The polls included are among Democrats or Democrats and Democratic-leaning independents. If multiple versions of polls are provided, the version among likely voters is prioritized, then registered voters, then adults.

== Opinion polling ==
=== Aggregate polls ===
Aggregate polls of declared candidates in the 2024 Democratic Party presidential primaries
Source of poll aggregation	Dates administered	Dates updated	Joe Biden	Dean Phillips	Marianne Williamson	Other/undecided (Note: Calculated by taking the difference of 100% and all other candidates combined.)	Margin
270 to Win	January 25 – February 14, 2024	February 18, 2024	74.2%	5.6%	8.0%	12.2%	Biden +66.2
FiveThirtyEight	through February 14, 2024	February 18, 2024	75.1%	6.9%	–	18.0%	Biden +68.2
Race to the WH	through January 29, 2024	February 2, 2024	71.9%	–	7.2%	20.9%	Biden +64.7
Real Clear Polling	December 26, 2023 – February 14, 2024	February 18, 2024	72.7%	4.7%	7.0%	15.6%	Biden +65.7
Average			73.5%	5.7%	7.4%	13.4%	Biden +66.1

=== Polling with declared candidates ===
Polling with declared candidates in the 2024 Democratic Party presidential primaries
Poll source	Date(s) administered	Sample size	Joe Biden	Robert F. Kennedy Jr. (withdrawn)	Dean Phillips	Marianne Williamson	Other	Undecided	Margin
	March 12, 2024	Georgia, Mississippi, the Northern Mariana Islands, Washington, and abroad primaries held. Joe Biden secures a majority of pledged delegates and becomes the presumptive Democratic nominee.							
	March 6, 2024	Dean Phillips suspends his campaign. Hawaii caucus held.							
Emerson College	March 5–6, 2024	540 (LV)	77.4%	–	3.8%	3.4%	–	15.4%	Biden +73.6%
	March 5, 2024	Super Tuesday held.							
TIPP/Issues & Insights	February 28 – March 1, 2024	603 (RV)	76%	–	9%	–	3%	12%	Biden +67%
New York Times/Siena College	February 25–28, 2024	224 (RV)	79%	–	10%	0%	1%	10%	Biden +69%
	February 28, 2024	Marianne Williamson relaunches her campaign.							
HarrisX/Forbes	February 24–28, 2024	1,076 (RV)	74%	–	7%	–	10%	8%	Biden +67%
	February 27, 2024	Michigan primary held.							
HarrisX	February 20–23, 2024	1,070 (RV)	72%	–	7%	–	12%	8%	Biden +65%
Quinnipiac	February 15–19, 2024	624 (RV)	80%	–	15%	–	2%	4%	Biden +65%
Marquette University Law School	February 5–15, 2024	356 (RV)	66%	–	2%	6%	–	27%	Biden +60%
Emerson College	February 13–14, 2024	489 (LV)	74.3%	–	8.7%	–	–	17.1%	Biden +66%
Echelon Insights	February 12–14, 2024	484 (LV)	78%	–	8%	–	2%	12%	Biden +70%
	February 7, 2024	Marianne Williamson suspends her campaign.							
	February 6, 2024	Nevada primary held.							
	February 3, 2024	South Carolina primary held.							
TIPP/Issues & Insights	January 31 – February 2, 2024	542 (RV)	70%	–	3%	5%	4%	17%	Biden +65%
McLaughlin & Associates	January 25–31, 2024	425 (LV)	67%	–	2%	9%	–	23%	Biden +58%
Emerson College	January 26–29, 2024	472 (LV)	72.3%	–	4.4%	4.2%	–	19.1%	Biden +67.9%
YouGov/Yahoo News	January 25–29, 2024	475 (RV)	74%	–	3%	4%	2%	18%	Biden +70%
Quinnipiac University	January 25–29, 2024	693 (RV)	78%	–	6%	11%	–	–	Biden +67%
	January 23, 2024	New Hampshire primary held.							
HarrisX/The Messenger	January 17–21, 2024	–	66%	–	5%	6%	10%	14%	Biden +60%
Echelon Insights	January 16–18, 2024	499 (LV)	69%	–	3%	3%	7%	17%	Biden +66%
Redfield & Wilton Strategies	January 18, 2024	546 (LV)	77%	–	3%	2%	6%	12%	Biden +74%
HarrisX/The Messenger	January 16–17, 2024	350 (RV)	69%	–	4%	9%	8%	11%	Biden +60%
Issues & Insights/TIPP	January 3–5, 2024	597 (LV)	69%	–	4%	5%	–	–	Biden +64%
USA Today/Suffolk	December 26–29, 2023	278 (LV)	73.74%	–	2.16%	8.99%	–	14.75%	Biden +64.75%
Morning Consult	December 22–24, 2023	800 (RV)	81%	–	1%	2%	–	16%	Biden +79%
McLaughlin & Associates	December 13–19, 2023	446 (LV)	69%	–	5%	6%	–	20%	Biden +63%
Quinnipiac University	December 14–18, 2023	683 (RV)	75%	–	5%	13%	1%	5%	Biden +62%
YouGov/Yahoo News	December 14–18, 2023	458 (RV)	68%	–	3%	4%	–	22%	Biden +64%
Echelon Insights	December 12–16, 2023	449 (LV)	65%	–	2%	8%	8%	17%	Biden +57%
Monmouth University/Washington Post	December 7–11, 2023	460 (LV)	79%	–	5%	9%	2% (Note: "Someone else" with 2%)	6%	Biden +70%
Emerson College	December 4–6, 2023	402 (RV)	63.3%	–	2.3%	4.8%	–	29.6%	Biden +58.5%
Big Village	November 27 – December 3, 2023	1,012 (LV)	70.4%	–	7.6%	12.9%	9.1%	–	Biden +57.5%
TIPP/Issues & Insights	November 29 – December 1, 2023	–	61%	–	3%	5%	4%	26%	Biden +56%
Harris X/The Messenger	November 22–28, 2023	1,399 (RV)	65%	–	4%	8%	11%	13%	Biden +57%
Emerson College	November 17–20, 2023	599 (LV)	65.8%	–	2.0%	4.8%	–	27.4%	Biden +61.0%
McLaughlin & Associates	November 16–20, 2023	440 (LV)	66%	–	3%	9%	–	22%	Biden +57%
Harris X/The Messenger	November 15–19, 2023	1,066 (RV)	65%	–	4%	5%	11%	15%	Biden +60%
Echelon Insights	November 14–17, 2023	482 (LV)	67%	–	5%	6%	4%	18%	Biden +61%
NBC News	November 10–14, 2023	311 (RV)	77%	–	4%	12%	7%	–	Biden +65%
Fox News	November 10–13, 2023	386 (RV)	72%	–	3%	13%	–	–	Biden +59%
YouGov/Yahoo News	November 9–13, 2023	461 (RV)	64%	–	4%	4%	–	26%	Biden +60%
Quinnipiac	November 9–13, 2023	666 (RV)	74%	–	4%	12%	4% (Note: Uygur at 1%; Refused, Someone Else and Would Not Vote at 1%)	5%	Biden +62%
Lord Ashcroft Polls	November 1–11, 2023	3,386 (LV)	70%	–	4%	6%	0%	20%	Biden +64%
Big Village	October 30 – November 5, 2023	642 (LV)	71.4%	–	9.2%	11.1%	8.3%	–	Biden +60.3%
TIPP Insights	November 1–3, 2023	1,282 (RV)	72%	–	4%	4%	–	20%	Biden +68%
Morning Consult	October 30 – November 2, 2023	789 (LV)	73%	–	4%	4%	–	19%	Biden +69%
CNN/SSRS	October 27 – November 2, 2023	562 (RV)	71%	–	11%	8%	5%	4%	Biden +61%
HarrisX/The Messenger	October 30 – November 1, 2023	725 (RV)	73%	–	4%	5%	9% (Note: Someone Else at 9%)	10%	Biden +68%
Quinnipiac	October 26–30, 2023	695 (RV)	77%	–	6%	8%	5% (Note: Uygur at 2%; Refused, Someone Else and Would Not Vote at 1%)	5%	Biden +69%
	October 26, 2023	Dean Phillips declares his candidacy.							
Echelon Insights	October 23–26, 2023	472 (LV)	59%	–	1%	7%	4% (Note: Uygur at 1%; Someone Else at 3%)	27%	Biden +52%
Noble Predictive Insights	October 20–26, 2023	894 (LV)	77%	–	–	8%	–	14%	Biden +69%
HarrisX/The Messenger	October 16–23, 2023	1,106 (RV)	70%	–	–	9%	13%	9%	Biden +61%
USA Today/Suffolk	October 17–20, 2023	289 (LV)	73.0%	–	–	10.7%	1.0%	15.2%	Biden +62.3%
Emerson College	October 16–17, 2023	643 (RV)	70.0%	–	–	9.9%	–	20.1%	Biden +60.1%
Yahoo News	October 12–16, 2023	509 (LV)	68%	–	–	6%	4%	21%	Biden +62%
Zogby Analytics	October 13–15, 2023	424 (LV)	67.6%	14.9%	–	1.6%	6.4%	9.6%	Biden +52.7%
	October 9, 2023	Robert F. Kennedy Jr. announces he will run as an independent.							
Harris X/The Messenger	October 4–7, 2023	1,080 (RV)	58%	15%	–	7%	7%	13%	Biden +43%
Big Village	September 29 – October 3, 2023	1,106 (RV)	61.8%	23.7%	–	7.2%	7.3%	–	Biden +38.1%
TIPP/Issues & Insights	September 27–29, 2023	560 (RV)	65%	14%	–	–	–	–	Biden +51%
Echelon Insights	September 25–28, 2023	499 (LV)	58%	18%	–	4%	4%	16%	Biden +40%
McLaughlin & Associates	September 22–26, 2023	432 (LV)	56%	15%	–	3%	–	26%	Biden +41%
Marquette University Law School	September 18–25, 2023	372 (LV)	49%	13%	–	4%	–	34%	Biden +36%
HarrisX/The Messenger	September 13–19, 2023	1,114 (RV)	62%	16%	–	6%	5%	11%	Biden +46%
Emerson College	September 17–18, 2023	457 (LV)	61.6%	14.3%	–	3.6%	–	20.5%	Biden +47.3%
Rasmussen	September 14–18, 2023	–	57%	25%	–	3%	7%	–	Biden +32%
YouGov	September 14–18, 2023	486 (RV)	68%	7%	–	4%	–	19%	Biden +61%
Harvard/Harris (Note: Poll sponsored by Harvard University Center for American Political Studies)	September 13–14, 2023	800 (RV)	60%	15%	–	4%	9%	13%	Biden +45%
Ipsos/Reuters	September 8–14, 2023	2,024 (A)	67%	14%	–	4%	–	–	Biden +53%
Fox News	September 9–12, 2023	404 (LV)	71%	17%	–	6%	3%	3%	Biden +54%
Quinnipiac University	September 7–11, 2023	724 (RV)	73%	11%	–	8%	–	–	Biden +62%
HarrisX/The Messenger	September 6–11, 2023	1,245 (RV)	65%	11%	–	7%	7%	10%	Biden +54%
Redfield & Wilton Strategies	September 3–4, 2023	618 (LV)	71%	9%	–	3%	3% (Note: Manchin at 1%)	14%	Biden +62%
Morning Consult	August 30 – September 1, 2023	800 (RV)	76%	9%	–	3%	–	–	Biden +67%
Issues & Insights/TIPP	August 30 – September 1, 2023	606 (RV)	68%	10%	–	5%	3%	14%	Biden +58%
Echelon Insights	August 28–31, 2023	468 (RV)	57%	13%	–	6%	4%	20%	Biden +44%
Big Village	August 25–27, 2023	919 (A)	60.3%	19.0%	–	9.7%	10.9%	–	Biden +41.3%
Emerson College	August 25–26, 2023	374 (RV)	61.0%	11.5%	–	4.4%	–	23.0%	Biden +49.5%
HarrisX	August 24–26, 2023	763 (RV)	66%	13%	–	7%	5%	9%	Biden +53%
McLaughlin & Associates	August 15–23, 2023	444 (LV)	61%	12%	–	7%	–	21%	Biden +40%
Big Data Poll	August 19–21, 2023	1,205 (LV)	70%	12%	–	3%	6%	9%	Biden +58%
HarrisX	August 17–21, 2023	648 (A)	64%	13%	–	4%	8%	11%	Biden +51%
Yahoo News/YouGov	August 17–21, 2023	495 (RV)	69%	7%	–	5%	2%	18%	Biden +62%
Emerson College	August 16–17, 2023	608	68.9%	8.9%	–	3.8%	–	18.5%	Biden +60.0%
Fox News/Beacon Research	August 11–14, 2023	399 (RV)	64%	17%	–	9%	–	–	Biden +47%
Quinnipiac University	August 10–14, 2023	666 (RV)	72%	13%	–	9%	1%	3%	Biden +59%
Issues & Insights/TIPP	August 2–4, 2023	615 (RV)	63%	15%	–	4%	3%	15%	Biden +48%
Echelon Insights	July 24–27, 2023	500 (LV)	62%	16%	–	5%	4%	14%	Biden +46%
The New York Times/Siena College	July 23–27, 2023	296 (LV)	64%	13%	–	10%	1%	12%	Biden +51%
Big Village	July 24–26, 2023	922 (A)	62.6%	19.8%	–	9.1%	8.4%	–	Biden +42.8%
McLaughlin & Associates	July 19–24, 2023	428 (LV)	65%	13%	–	3%	–	19%	Biden +52%
Harvard-Harris	July 19–20, 2023	–	62%	16%	–	5%	5%	11%	Biden +46%
Quinnipiac University	July 13–17, 2023	727 (RV)	71%	14%	–	7%	1%	5%	Biden +57%
Yahoo News	July 13–17, 2023	494	69%	7%	–	5%	2%	17%	Biden +62%
Reuters/Ipsos	July 11–17, 2023	2,044 (RV)	63%	15%	–	4%	3%	14%	Biden +48%
Issues & Insights/TIPP	July 5–7, 2023	–	60%	16%	–	5%	5%	14%	Biden +44%
Echelon Insights	June 26–29, 2023	511 (LV)	65%	14%	–	5%	6%	11%	Biden +51%
Fox News	June 23–26, 2023	391	64%	17%	–	10%	4%	6%	Biden +47%
Emerson College	June 19–20, 2023	441 (RV)	72.5%	14.6%	–	2.5%	10.4%	–	Biden +57.9%
YouGov	June 16–20, 2023	–	70%	7%	–	3%	2%	18%	Biden +63%
Harvard-Harris	June 14–15, 2023	2,090 (RV)	62%	15%	–	4%	8%	12%	Biden +47%
The Messenger/HarrisX	June 14–15, 2023	381 (RV)	54%	14%	–	5%	10%	17%	Biden +40%
Big Village	June 9–14, 2023	916 (RV)	60.0%	18.3%	–	11.2%	10.5%	–	Biden +41.7%
Quinnipiac University	June 8–12, 2023	722 (RV)	70%	17%	–	8%	–	–	Biden +53%
USA Today/Suffolk	June 5–9, 2023	293 (RV)	58%	15%	–	6%	–	21%	Biden +43%
Issues & Insights/TIPP	May 31 – June 2, 2023	638 (RV)	68%	12%	–	4%	4%	12%	Biden +56%
YouGov	May 25–30, 2023	467 (RV)	62%	12%	–	5%	–	19%	Biden +50%
Big Village	May 26–28, 2023	425 (LV)	58.8%	19.0%	–	10.6%	11.6%	–	Biden +39.8%
Echelon Insights	May 22–25, 2023	538 (LV)	60%	14%	–	5%	2%	19%	Biden +46%
Fox News	May 19–22, 2023	1,001 (RV)	62%	16%	–	8%	6%	8%	Biden +46%
CNN	May 17–20, 2023	432 (RV)	60%	20%	–	8%	13%	–	Biden +40%
Marquette Law School	May 8–18, 2023	312 (RV)	53%	12%	–	7%	–	28%	Biden +41%
YouGov	May 5–8, 2023	480 (RV)	67%	10%	–	6%	–	17%	Biden +57%
Rasmussen Reports	May 3–7, 2023	910 (LV)	62%	19%	–	4%	15%	–	Biden +43%
Change Research	April 28 – May 2, 2023	1,208 (LV)	65%	11%	–	11%	11%	2%	Biden +55%
Echelon Insights	April 25–27, 2023	513 (LV)	66%	10%	–	2%	5%	17%	Biden +56%
	April 25, 2023	President Joe Biden declares his candidacy.							
Emerson College Polling	April 24–25, 2023	1,100 (RV)	70%	21%	–	8%	–	–	Biden +49%
Fox News	April 21–24, 2023	1,004 (RV)	62%	19%	–	9%	–	10%	Biden +43%
Suffolk University	April 19, 2023	600 (LV)	67%	14%	–	5%	–	13%	Biden +53%
Morning Consult	April 7–9, 2023	827 (LV)	70%	10%	–	4%	8%	8%	Biden +60%
	April 5, 2023	Robert F. Kennedy Jr. declares his candidacy.							
Echelon Insights (Note: Archived April 3, 2023, at the Wayback Machine)	March 27–29, 2023	370 (LV)	73%	–	–	10%	17%	–	Biden +63%
Morning Consult	March 3–5, 2023	826 (LV)	77%	–	–	4%	9%	10%	Biden +73%
	March 4, 2023	Marianne Williamson declares her candidacy.							

=== Hypothetical polling ===
This section lists polling with hypothetical candidates, which was mostly conducted between 2020 and April 2023, before the presidential candidacies were declared.

==== Polls including Joe Biden ====
Hypothetical polls including Joe Biden
Poll source	Date(s) administered	Sample size	Stacey Abrams	Joe Biden	Pete Buttigieg	Kamala Harris	Amy Klobuchar	Gavin Newsom	Alexandria Ocasio-Cortez	Bernie Sanders	Elizabeth Warren	Other
The Center Square/Noble Predictive Insights	July 8–11, 2024	1,221 (LV)	–	34%	5%	15%	–	7%	–	7%	2%	30% (Note: Michelle Obama with 15%; "Someone else" with 6%; Hillary Clinton with 5%; Gretchen Whitmer with 3%; J. B. Pritzker with 1%; Raphael Warnock with 0%)
American Pulse Research and Polling	October 27–30, 2023	243 (LV)	–	38%	–	11%	–	17%	–	10%	–	24% (Note: Another Candidate at 7%; Phillips and Williamson at 1%; Undecided at 15%)
	April 25, 2023	Biden declares his candidacy										
Big Village	April 19–23, 2023	902 (A)	–	32%	7%	15%	3%	5%	6%	13%	4%	13% (Note: Kennedy with 7%; Shapiro, Williamson and Whitmer with 2%)
Harris Poll & HarrisX	April 18–19, 2023	683 (RV)	3%	37%	6%	10%	2%	4%	2%	8%	4%	11% (Note: Hillary Clinton with 7%; Andrew Cuomo with 2%; Joe Manchin and Marianne Williamson with 1%)
Legar	April 6–10, 2023	368 (A)	–	27%	7%	10%	2%	7%	–	12%	6%	7% (Note: Whitmer with 4%; and Booker with 3%)
Big Village	March 29–31, 2023	445 (A)	–	36%	7%	15%	2%	4%	5%	13%	8%	7% (Note: Whitmer with 3%; Williamson and Shapiro with 1%)
Harris Poll & HarrisX	March 22–23, 2023	2,905 (RV)	2%	41%	5%	11%	2%	3%	3%	7%	4%	10% (Note: Hillary Clinton with 6%; Joe Manchin with 2%; Andrew Cuomo and Marianne Williamson with 1%)
Big Village	March 15–17, 2023	434 (A)	–	33%	5%	17%	5%	5%	6%	15%	7%	4%
Yahoo! News Survey/You Gov	February 23–27, 2023	1,516 (LV)	–	53%	–	22%	–	–	–	–	–	25%
McLaughlin & Associates	February 17–23, 2023	442 (LV)	–	26%	7%	6%	2%	3%	3%	8%	4%	41% (Note: Michelle Obama with 14%; Hillary Clinton with 4%; Beto O'Rourke, Phil Murphy and Cory Booker with 2%; Manchin, Kaine, Hickenlooper, Gillibrand, Steyer and Polis with 1%; Adams and Patrick with 0%)
Big Village	February 15–17, 2023	437 (A)	–	34%	9%	13%	3%	6%	7%	13%	7%	8% (Note: Gretchen Whitmer with 4%; Josh Shapiro with 1%)
Harris Poll	February 15–16, 2023	–	2%	36%	6%	15%	2%	4%	4%	8%	3%	20% (Note: Hillary Clinton with 8%; Andrew Cuomo with 2%; Manchin with 1%)
Léger	February 10–13, 2023	354 (A)	–	25%	10%	10%	1%	6%	–	14%	4%	30% (Note: Cory Booker with 6%; Gretchen Whitmer with 2%)
Ipsos	February 6–13, 2023	1,786 (RV)	–	35%	10%	12%	–	5%	–	13%	5%	20% (Note: Gretchen Whitmer with 3%; Josh Shapiro with 2%)
McLaughlin & Associates	January 19–24, 2023	442 (LV)	0%	25%	7%	6%	2%	7%	5%	5%	4%	40% (Note: Obama with 14%; Clinton with 6%; O'Rourke with 2%; Booker, Gillibrand, Kaine, Manchin, and Polis with 1%; Adams, Cuomo, Hickenlooper, Markle, McConaughey, Murphy, Patrick, Steyer, and Winfrey with 0%, Undecided with 13%)
Big Village	January 18–20, 2023	447 (A)	–	34.3%	9.0%	14.0%	3.9%	5.2%	5.4%	13.2%	5.7%	9.3% (Note: Whitmer with 3.0%; Shapiro with 2.8%; Someone Else with 3.5%)
Harris Poll	January 18–19, 2023	–	3%	35%	5%	12%	3%	3%	3%	11%	3%	25% (Note: Hillary Clinton with 8%; Manchin and Cuomo with 1%)
YouGov	January 14–17, 2023	618 (A)	–	39%	10%	8%	–	6%	–	13%	–	26% (Note: Gretchen Whitmer with 3%; Someone Else with 3%; Not Sure with 16%; Would Not Vote with 4%)
YouGov	January 5–9, 2023	442 (A)	–	31%	11%	9%	4%	6%	–	14%	9%	9% (Note: Gretchen Whitmer with 5%; Raphael Warnock with 4%)
Big Village	January 4–6, 2023	477 (A)	–	32.9%	8.7%	16.0%	–	–	–	12.5%	–	29.9% (Note: Someone else at 29.9%)
Big Village	December 16–18, 2022	466 (A)	–	37.2%	9.8%	15.8%	–	–	–	10.1%	–	27.1% (Note: Someone Else at 27.1%)
Harris Poll	December 14–15, 2022	685 (RV)	3%	36%	6%	10%	3%	–	5%	7%	3%	27% (Note: Hillary Clinton with 7%; Michael Bloomberg with 3%; Joe Manchin and Andrew Cuomo with 2%)
Harris Poll	December 14–15, 2022	685 (RV)	3%	36%	6%	10%	3%	–	5%	7%	3%	27% (Note: Hillary Clinton with 7%; Michael Bloomberg with 3%; Joe Manchin and Andrew Cuomo with 2%)
McLaughlin & Associates	December 9–14, 2022	455 (RV)	–	22%	6%	8%	2%	3%	4%	8%	2%	42% (Note: Michelle Obama with 18%; Hillary Clinton with 6%; O'Rourke with 3%; Booker with 2%; Winfrey and Manchin with 1%; Phil Murphy, Kaine, Adams, Hickenlooper, Patrick, Gillibrand, Steyer and Polis with 0%)
Marist College	December 6–8, 2022	519 (RV)	–	35%	16%	17%	–	–	–	–	–	32%
Big Village	November 30 – December 2, 2022	452 (A)	–	35%	9%	15%	4%	4%	5%	13%	7%	4% (Note: Gretchen Whitmer with 3%; Shapiro with 1%)
Cornell University Collaborative Midterm Survey	October 26 – November 25, 2022	4,079 (A)	–	27%	14%	15%	6%	11%	8%	12%	–	7% (Note: Hillary Clinton with 7%)
Ipsos	November 9–21, 2022	569 (LV)	5%	15%	10%	11%	3%	5%	4%	7%	5%	35% (Note: Gretchen Whitmer with 3%; Polis with 1%; Cooper with 0%)
Emerson College	November 18–19, 2022	591 (RV)	–	42%	9%	17%	–	6%	–	12%	7%	4% (Note: Gretchen Whitmer and Jared Polis with 2%)
Big Village	November 16–18, 2022	454 (A)	–	39%	8%	14%	–	–	–	11%	6%	–
Harris Poll	November 16–17, 2022	–	3%	35%	6%	13%	3%	–	4%	9%	3%	24% (Note: Hillary Clinton with 6%; Joe Manchin and Michael Bloomberg with 2%)
Zogby Analytics	November 9–11, 2022	859 (LV)	2%	41%	9%	11%	–	10%	6%	13%	9%	–
Big Village	November 9–10, 2022	446 (A)	–	39%	16%	25%	–	–	–	16%	–	–
	November 8, 2022	2022 midterm elections										
Big Village	November 2–4, 2022	356 (LV)	–	42%	19%	19%	–	–	–	16%	–	–
Big Village	November 2–4, 2022	444 (A)	–	40%	16%	21%	–	–	–	18%	–	–
Big Village	October 31 – November 2, 2022	378 (LV)	–	41%	13%	21%	–	–	–	19%	–	–
Big Village	October 31 – November 2, 2022	488 (A)	–	39%	12%	22%	–	–	–	22%	–	–
YouGov	October 11–26, 2022	1,860 (RV)	–	42%	14%	14%	–	7%	12%	–	–	1% (Note: Hochul with 1%)
YouGov	October 17–19, 2022	–	–	29%	13%	9%	–	–	7%	14%	8%	10% (Note: Hillary Clinton with 10%)
McLaughlin & Associates	October 12–17, 2022	474 (LV)	3%	27%	4%	9%	1%	3%	3%	8%	2%	40% (Note: Michelle Obama with 12%; Hillary Clinton and O'Rourke with 5%; Winfrey and Booker with 2%; McConaughey, Manchin, Cuomo, Phil Murphy and Adams with 1%; Kaine, Hickenlooper, Patrick, Gillibrand, Steyer and Polis with 0%)
Harris Poll	October 12–13, 2022	744 (RV)	3%	37%	6%	13%	1%	–	4%	6%	3%	13% (Note: Hillary Clinton with 9%; Michael Bloomberg and Joe Manchin with 2%)
Big Village	October 5–7, 2022	362 (RV)	–	44%	15%	17%	–	–	–	–	20%	–
Big Village	October 5–7, 2022	453 (A)	–	40%	15%	20%	–	–	–	–	21%	–
Big Village	September 21–23, 2022	397 (RV)	–	48%	16%	14%	–	–	–	–	15%	–
Big Village	September 21–23, 2022	434 (A)	–	47%	16%	15%	–	–	–	–	15%	–
McLaughlin & Associates	September 17–22, 2022	471 (LV)	4%	27%	5%	6%	1%	2%	3%	7%	2%	43% (Note: Michelle Obama with 16%; Hillary Clinton with 6%; Beto O'Rourke with 3%; Matthew McConaughey with 2%; Booker, Winfrey, Manchin, Kaine, Hickenlooper, Steyer and Polis with 1%; Cuomo, Murphy, Adams, Patrick and Gillibrand with 0%)
TIPP Insights	September 7–9, 2022	596 (RV)	3%	34%	4%	10%	1%	4%	2%	7%	3%	32% (Note: Michelle Obama with 11%; Hillary Clinton with 5%; Kennedy, Whitmer, Booker, Pritzker, Adams, Manchin, Bennet, Inslee and Lujan Grisham with 1%; Gabbard with 0%)
Big Village	September 7–9, 2022	492 (A)	–	43%	14%	22%	–	–	–	–	17%	–
Harris Poll	September 7–8, 2022	672 (RV)	4%	37%	6%	13%	3%	–	3%	8%	2%	12% (Note: Hillary Clinton with 7%; Michael Bloomberg with 3%; Joe Manchin with 2%)
Big Village	August 24–26, 2022	487 (A)	–	40%	16%	19%	–	–	–	–	19%	–
McLaughlin & Associates	August 20–24, 2022	468 (LV)	3%	23%	5%	8%	1%	5%	1%	6%	3%	45% (Note: Michelle Obama with 13%; Hillary Clinton with 6%; Beto O'Rourke with 4%; Cory Booker and Joe Manchin with 2%; Winfrey, McConaughey, Cuomo, Murphy and Adams, Hickenlooper, Gillibrand and Steyer with 1%; Kaine and Polis with 0%)
Big Village	August 10–12, 2022	465 (A)	–	37%	14%	20%	–	–	–	–	22%	–
TIPP Insights	August 2–4, 2022	576 (RV)	4%	30%	4%	8%	1%	6%	3%	8%	4%	32% (Note: Michelle Obama with 10%; Hillary Clinton with 5%; Cory Booker with 3%; Gretchen Whitmer and Kennedy with 2%; Pritzker and Gabbard with 1%; Bennet, Lujan Grisham, Manchin, Inslee and Adams with 0%)
Harris Poll	July 27–28, 2022	697 (RV)	4%	31%	5%	12%	3%	–	3%	8%	4%	14% (Note: Hillary Clinton with 9%; Joe Manchin with 3%; Michael Bloomberg with 2%)
Harris Poll	June 29–30, 2022	484 (RV)	4%	30%	6%	18%	2%	–	4%	8%	3%	8% (Note: Hillary Clinton with 6%; Manchin and Bloomberg with 1%)
McLaughlin & Associates	June 17–22, 2022	456 (LV)	5%	23%	5%	5%	2%	2%	6%	–	–	40% (Note: Michelle Obama with 18%; Hillary Clinton with 5%; Beto O'Rourke with 4%; Cory Booker with 3%; Oprah Winfrey with 2%; Manchin, McConaughey, Cuomo, Murphy, Kaine and Adams with 1%; Hickenlooper, Patrick, Gillibrand and Steyer with 0%)
TIPP Insights	June 8–10, 2022	509 (RV)	2%	24%	4%	7%	2%	2%	3%	9%	3%	30% (Note: Michelle Obama with 14%; Hillary Clinton with 6%; Cory Booker with 3%; Kennedy, Whitmer, Bennet, Lujan Grisham and Gabbard with 1%; Manchin, Inslee and Pritzker with 0%)

Hypothetical polls without Joe Biden
Poll source	Date(s) administered	Sample size	Stacey Abrams	Cory Booker	Pete Buttigieg	Hillary Clinton	Andrew Cuomo	Kamala Harris	Amy Klobuchar	Joe Manchin	Gavin Newsom	Michelle Obama	Alexandria Ocasio-Cortez	Bernie Sanders	Elizabeth Warren	Gretchen Whitmer	Other	Undecided
Yahoo News/YouGov	June 28 – July 1, 2024	536 (RV)	–	7%	8%	–	–	31%	2%	–	17%	–	3%	7%	4%	6%	2% (Note: "I would not vote" with 2%)	20%
Florida Atlantic University/Mainstreet Research	June 29–30, 2024	397 (RV)	–	–	6%	–	–	25%	–	–	17%	21%	2%	–	–	7%	6% (Note: "Another candidate" with 6%)	16%
Data for Progress (D)	June 28, 2024	387 (LV)	–	7%	10%	–	–	39%	2%	–	18%	–	–	–	–	6%	7% (Note: J.B. Pritzker & Josh Shapiro 2%; "Someone else" with 6%)	9%
SurveyUSA	June 28, 2024	879 (LV)	–	–	8%	–	–	43%	–	–	16%	–	–	–	–	7%	7% (Note: Josh Shapiro with 4%; Wes Moore with 2%; "Someone else" with 1%)	20%
HarrisX/The Blockchain Association	November 24–26, 2023	756 (RV)	2%	–	7%	11%	3%	22%	3%	3%	7%	–	3%	10%	5%	–	8% (Note: "Someone else" with 6%; Marianne Williamson with 2%)	17%
Issues & Insights/TIPP	November 2–3, 2023	448 (RV)	–	–	8%	10%	–	26%	3%	–	9%	10%	–	10%	6%	–	5% (Note: "Someone else" with 3%; Marianne Williamson with 2%)	12%
HarrisX/The Messenger	October 30 – November 1, 2023	725 (RV)	–	–	–	–	–	48%	–	–	–	–	–	–	–	–	33% (Note: Someone Else at 19%; Williamson at 8%; Phillips at 6%)	20%
Big Village	April 19–23, 2023	902 (A)	–	–	10%	–	–	28%	4%	–	7%	–	7%	16%	7%	3%	14% (Note: Kennedy with 10%; Williamson and Shapiro with 2%)	
Big Village	March 29–31, 2023	445 (A)	–	–	11%	–	–	28%	4%	–	7%	–	7%	18%	11%	4%	7% (Note: Marianne Williamson with 3%; and Josh Shapiro with 4%)	
Echelon Insights	March 27–29, 2023	530 (RV)	2%	4%	8%	–	–	27%	2%	–	9%	–	6%	–	7%	5%	7% (Note: Marianne Williamson with 4%; and Roy Cooper, Phil Murphy, and Rapheal Warnock with 1%)	
Harris Poll & HarrisX	March 22–23, 2023	2,905 (RV)	5%	–	8%	13%	2%	22%	3%	4%	6%	–	4%	10%	8%	–	4% (Note: Marianne Williamson with 1%)	
Big Village	March 15–17, 2023	434 (A)	–	–	7%	–	–	31%	4%	–	8%	–	8%	21%	10%	3%	2%	
Yahoo News	February 23–27, 2023	450 (LV)	–	–	12%	–	–	25%	5%	–	12%	–	–	12%	8%	5%		
Echelon Insights	February 21–23, 2023	499 (LV)	3%	5%	14%	–	–	27%	5%	0%	6%	–	6%	–	8%	3%	24% (Note: Raphael Warnock with 2%; JB Pritzker with 1%; Beshear, Cooper and Raimondo on 0%)	
McLaughlin & Associates	February 17–23, 2023	442 (LV)	–	3%	11%	6%	–	11%	3%	2%	5%	19%	5%	9%	6%	–	12% (Note: Beto O'Rourke with 3%; Phil Murphy with 1%; Gillibrand, Adams, Patrick, Hickenlooper, Steyer, and Polis with 1%; Kaine and Pritzker with 0%)	
Big Village	February 15–17, 2023	437 (A)	–	–	11%	–	–	27%	5%	–	9%	–	8%	18%	10%	5%	3% (Note: Josh Shapiro with 3%, Pritzker with 0%)	
Harris Poll	February 15–16, 2023	–	3%	–	8%	16%	3%	22%	4%	5%	7%	–	7%	12%	3%	–	–	
Ipsos	February 6–13, 2023	1,786 (RV)	–	–	15%	–	–	27%	–	–	10%	–	–	18%	8%	4%	3% (Note: Josh Shapiro with 3%, Pritzker with 0%)	
Echelon Insights	January 23–25, 2023	467 (LV)	4%	4%	11%	–	–	23%	4%	–	8%	–	9%	–	8%	3%	9% (Note: Pritzker with 3%, Raimondo, Polis and Warnock with 1%; Beshear, Cooper, Murphy, Adams and Landrieu with 0%)	
McLaughlin & Associates	January 19–24, 2023	442 (LV)	–	2%	8%	8%	–	15%	2%	2%	7%	15%	6%	5%	5%	–	11% (Note: Beto O'Rourke with 3%; Gillibrand, Adams, Patrick, Murphy, Hickenlooper, Steyer, Markle and Polis with 1%; Kaine and Pritzker with 0%)	
Big Village	January 18–20, 2023	447 (A)	–	–	14%	–	–	29%	5%	–	8%	–	6%	19%	8%	4%	3% (Note: Josh Shapiro with 3%, Pritzker with 0%)	
Harris Poll	January 18–19, 2023	–	5%	–	7%	11%	2%	26%	5%	4%	6%	–	4%	12%	5%	–	–	
Big Village	January 4–6, 2023	477 (A)	–	–	11%	–	–	30%	5%	–	11%	–	9%	17%	7%	2%	4% (Note: Josh Shapiro with 4%, Pritzker with 0%)	
Big Village	December 16–18, 2022	466 (A)	–	–	10%	14%	2%	35%	5%	–	7%	–	6%	16%	8%	3%	3% (Note: Josh Shapiro with 3%; Pritzker with 0%)	
Harris Poll	December 14–15, 2022	685 (RV)	3%	–	9%	14%	2%	23%	4%	4%	–	–	5%	11%	5%	–	–	
Echelon Insights	December 12–14, 2022	523 (RV)	3%	3%	11%	–	–	24%	6%	–	5%	–	5%	–	5%	3%	12% (Note: Pritzker and Warnock with 3%; Beshear, Raimondo, Murphy, Adams and Polis with 1%; Landrieu and Cooper with 0%)	
Echelon Insights	December 12–14, 2022	476 (LV)	3%	3%	12%	–	–	26%	5%	–	6%	–	5%	–	5%	3%	10% (Note: Pritzker and Warnock with 2%; Cooper, Murphy, Polis and Adams with 1%; Beshear, Landrieu and Raimondo with 0%)	
McLaughlin & Associates	December 9–14, 2022	455 (LV)	–	1%	6%	8%	–	13%	3%	2%	4%	21%	4%	9%	5%	–	12% (Note: Beto O'Rourke with 4%; Oprah Winfrey with 3%; Kaine and Gillibrand with 1%; Adams, Patrick, Murphy, Pritzker, Hickenlooper, Steyer, and Polis with 0%)	
YouGov	December 1–5, 2022	588 (RV)	–	–	14%	–	–	19%	–	–	10%	–	6%	13%	7%	7%	–	
YouGov	December 1–5, 2022	724 (A)	–	–	12%	–	–	18%	–	–	9%	–	7%	11%	7%	6%	–	
Big Village	November 30 – December 2, 2022	452 (A)	–	–	13%	–	–	32%	6%	–	5%	–	6%	17%	9%	3%	2% (Note: Josh Shapiro with 2%, Pritzker with 0%)	
Echelon Insights	November 17–19, 2022	496 (RV)	3%	4%	13%	–	–	21%	2%	–	6%	–	7%	–	7%	4%	7% (Note: Phil Murphy with 2%; Beshear and Warnock with 1%; Sinema, Cooper, Landrieu, Pritzker, Raimondo, Adams, and Polis with 0%)	
Echelon Insights	November 17–19, 2022	496 (LV)	2%	4%	12%	–	–	23%	4%	–	6%	–	7%	–	8%	3%	7% (Note: Phil Murphy with 2%; Beshear and Warnock with 1%; Sinema, Cooper, Landrieu, Pritzker, Raimondo, Adams, and Polis with 0%)	
Harris Poll	November 16–17, 2022	–	4%	–	8%	–	–	24%	4%	3%	–	–	6%	11%	6%	–	3% (Note: Michael Bloomberg with 3%)	
Zogby Analytics	November 9–11, 2022	859 (LV)	5%	–	10%	–	–	32%	–	–	6%	–	10%	13%	9%	–	38%	
	November 8, 2022	2022 midterm elections																
Echelon Insights	October 24–26, 2022	475 (LV)	5%	4%	11%	–	–	27%	3%	–	4%	–	7%	–	6%	1%	12% (Note: Andy Beshear with 3%; Raphael Warnock with 2%; Sinema, Cooper, Landrieu, Murphy, Pritzker, and Adams with 1%; Raimondo and Polis with 0%)	
Echelon Insights	October 24–26, 2022	475 (LV)	5%	3%	14%	–	–	26%	4%	–	6%	–	5%	–	7%	1%	11% (Note: Andy Beshear and Raphael Warnock with 2%; Sinema, Cooper, Pritzker, and Adams with 1%; Landrieu, Raimondo, Murphy and Polis with 0%)	
McLaughlin & Associates	October 12–17, 2022	474 (LV)	3%	2%	6%	6%	2%	16%	2%	2%	5%	17%	5%	8%	2%	0%	24% (Note: Beto O'Rourke with 5%; Oprah Winfrey with 2%; McConaughey, Polis, Patrick, Hickenlooper and Steyer with 1%; Adams, Kaine, Murphy, Pritzker, and Gillibrand with 0%)	
Harris Poll	October 12–13, 2022	744 (RV)	3%	–	10%	17%		25%	2%	4%	–	–	5%	11%	4%	–	3% (Note: Michael Bloomberg with 3%)	
Morning Consult	September 23–25, 2022	893 (RV)	–	4%	13%	–	–	26%	4%	–	5%	–	8%	–	7%	1%	4% (Note: Adams, Pritzker, and Raimondo with 1%; Cooper with 0%)	
McLaughlin & Associates	September 17–22, 2022	471 (LV)	4%	1%	6%	11%	1%	11%	2%	1%	5%	18%	2%	7%	4%	0%	25% (Note: Beto O'Rourke with 5%; Oprah Winfrey with 3%; Matthew McConaughey and Jared Polis with 2%; Adams, Murphy, Gillibrand, Patrick, Pritzker, Hickenlooper, and Steyer with 1%; Omar with 0%)	
Echelon Insights	September 16–19, 2022	509 (LV)	8%	3%	11%	–	–	28%	5%	–	6%	–	7%	–	5%	2%	8% (Note: Murphy, Polis, Pritzker, and Warnock with 1%; Raimondo, Beshear, Sinema, Cooper and Landrieu with 0%)	
Harris Poll	September 7–8, 2022	672 (RV)	6%	–	9%	14%	–	26%	2%	2%	–	–	5%	10%	5%	–	3% (Note: Michael Bloomberg with 3%)	
McLaughlin & Associates	August 20–24, 2022	468 (LV)	4%	2%	6%	7%	1%	15%	2%	2%	4%	16%	2%	7%	5%	2%	25% (Note: Beto O'Rourke with 3%; Tim Kaine, Oprah Winfrey and Matthew McConaughey with 2%; Adams, Murphy, Gillibrand, and Steyer with 1%; Patrick, Hickenlooper, Omar, Pritzker, and Polis with 0%)	
Echelon Insights	August 19–22, 2022	515 (RV)	6%	3%	12%	–	–	22%	2%	–	6%	–	9%	–	5%	2%	8% (Note: Phil Murphy and Kyrsten Sinema with 2%; Beshear, Adams, Polis, and Warnock with 1%; Cooper, Landrieu, Pritzker, and Raimondo with 0%)	
Echelon Insights	August 19–22, 2022	505 (LV)	7%	4%	14%	–	–	21%	3%	–	6%	–	5%	–	6%	2%	8% (Note: Phil Murphy with 2%; Beshear, Sinema, Adams, Polis, and Warnock with 1%; Cooper, Pritzker, Landrieu, and Raimondo with 0%)	
Harris Poll	July 27–28, 2022	697 (RV)	5%	–	8%	–	–	23%	4%	4%	–	–	5%	8%	4%	–	4% (Note: Michael Bloomberg with 4%)	
Suffolk University	July 22–25, 2022	440 (RV)	–	–	16%	8%	–	18%	11%	–	8%	–	10%	18%	–	–	–	
Echelon Insights	July 15–18, 2022	500 (RV)	7%	4%	10%	–	–	27%	3%	0%	7%	–	5%	–	7%	1%	10% (Note: Pritzker and Warnock with 2%; Murphy, Adams, Raimondo and Polis with 1%; Beshear, Sinema, Cooper and Landrieu with 0%)	
Echelon Insights	July 15–18, 2022	493 (LV)	6%	5%	13%	–	–	26%	3%	0%	7%	–	5%	–	7%	1%	9% (Note: Pritzker with 2%, Murphy, Adams, Polis and Warnock with 1%; Beshear, Sinema, Cooper, Landrieu and Raimondo with 0%)	
Harris Poll	June 29–30, 2022	484 (RV)	4%	–	6%	–	–	25%	4%	1%	–	–	4%	12%	6%	–	14% (Note: Michael Bloomberg with 3%)	
McLaughlin & Associates	June 17–22, 2022	456 (LV)	6%	3%	8%	7%	1%	13%	3%	2%	3%	19%	7%	–	–	–	13% (Note: Beto O'Rourke with 4%; Oprah Winfrey and Matthew McConaughey with 2%; Adams, Kaine, Patrick, and Murphy with 1%; Gillibrand, Hickenlooper, Pritzker, and Steyer with 0%)	
Echelon Insights	June 17–20, 2022	489 (RV)	5%	5%	11%	–	–	30%	3%	0%	5%	–	6%	–	6%	2%	8% (Note: Pritzker with 2%, Sinema, Murphy and Warnock with 1%; Beshear, Raimondo, Adams, Polis, Cooper and Landrieu with 0%)	
Echelon Insights	June 17–20, 2022	484 (LV)	6%	6%	12%	–	–	27%	4%	0%	5%	–	7%	–	6%	2%	8% (Note: Kyrsten Sinema, Phil Murphy, JB Pritzker, and Raphael Warnock with 1%; Beshear, Raimondo, Adams, Polis, Cooper, and Landrieu with 0%)	
Zogby Analytics	May 23–24, 2022	554 (LV)	5%	–	–	21%	–	19%	–	–	5%	21%	–	8%	4%	–	7% (Note: Jill Biden with 7%)	10%
Echelon Insights	May 20–23, 2022	474 (LV)	7%	7%	12%	–	–	30%	2%	–	4%	–	4%	–	5%	1%	7% (Note: Cooper, Raimondo and Pritzker with 1%; Beshear, Sinema, Landrieu, Murphy, Adams, Polis and Warnock with 0%)	21%
Echelon Insights	May 20–23, 2022	480 (RV)	7%	5%	11%	–	–	31%	2%	–	3%	–	8%	–	5%	1%	7% (Note: Cooper, Raimondo and Pritzker with 1%; Beshear, Sinema, Landrieu, Murphy, Adams, Polis and Warnock with 0%)	20%
Harvard/Harris	May 18–19, 2022	–	3%	–	7%	10%	–	19%	3%	6%	–	–	4%	10%	4%	–	4% (Note: Michael Bloomberg with 4%)	28%
McLaughlin & Associates	April 22–26, 2022	463 (LV)	6%	3%	9%	9%	2%	17%	4%	1%	2%	23%	1%	4%	–	–	4% (Note: Eric Adams, Tim Kaine, Beto O'Rourke, and Tom Steyer with 1%; Kirsten Gillibrand, John Hickenlooper, Phil Murphy, Ilhan Omar, and Deval Patrick with 0%)	17%
Harvard/Harris	April 20–21, 2022	727 (RV)	5%	–	8%	14%	–	31%	3%	4%	–	–	6%	10%	5%	–	–	14%
Echelon Insights	April 18–20, 2022	469 (RV)	5%	6%	10%	–	–	31%	3%	1%	1%	–	6%	–	6%	1%	9% (Note: Tulsi Gabbard with 2%; Cooper and Murphy with 1%; Beshear, Sinema, Landrieu, Adams, Polis, Raimondo and Pritzker with 0%)	19%
Echelon Insights	April 18–20, 2022	456 (LV)	6%	7%	11%	–	–	30%	4%	1%	1%	–	5%	–	6%	1%	8% (Note: Tulsi Gabbard with 2%; Cooper and Murphy with 1%; Beshear, Sinema, Landrieu, Adams, Polis, Raimondo and Pritzker with 0%)	20%
Harvard/Harris	March 23–24, 2022	740 (RV)	6%	–	8%	15%	–	28%	4%	3%	–	–	4%	9%	4%	–	–	19%
Echelon Insights	March 18–21, 2022	472 (LV)	6%	4%	9%	–	–	26%	5%	–	2%	–	7%	–	8%	1%	8% (Note: Eric Adams with 2%; Cooper, Raimondo, Murphy, Pritzker and Polis with 1%; Landrieu, Beshear, Raimondo and Sinema with 0%)	24%
Echelon Insights	March 18–21, 2022	490 (LV)	6%	4%	11%	–	–	26%	6%	–	2%	–	6%	–	8%	1%	6% (Note: Cooper and Adams with 1%; Sinema, Beshear, Landrieu, Raimondo, Pritzker, Murphy and Polis with 0%)	22%
McLaughlin & Associates	March 17–22, 2022	466 (LV)	5%	3%	7%	7%	1%	18%	2%	2%	2%	20%	2%	6%	–	–	9% (Note: Beto O'Rourke with 3%, Tom Steyer with 2%; Eric Adams, Tim Kaine, and Deval Patrick with 1%; Kirsten Gillibrand and Ilhan Omar with 0%)	18%
Harvard/Harris	February 23–24, 2022	750 (RV)	5%	–	8%	13%	–	29%	3%	5%	–	–	5%	9%	6%	–	–	17%
Echelon Insights	February 19–23, 2022	543 (RV)	8%	6%	9%	–	–	29%	3%	–	2%	–	10%	–	6%	0%	8% (Note: Roy Cooper with 2%; Beshear, Sinema, Raimondo and Murphy with 1%; Landrieu, Pritzker and Adams with 0%)	21%
McLaughlin & Associates	February 16–22, 2022	453 (LV)	6%	4%	10%	9%	1%	15%	2%	2%	4%	22%	6%	–	–	–	8% (Note: Beto O'Rourke with 3%; John Hickenlooper with 2%; Tim Kaine, Deval Patrick, and Tom Steyer with 1%; Eric Adams, Kirsten Gillibrand, and Ilhan Omar with 0%)	13%
Echelon Insights	January 21–23, 2022	477 (RV)	6%	5%	12%	–	–	30%	3%	–	2%	–	5%	–	8%	1%	7% (Note: Beshear, Sinema, Cooper, Landrieu, Raimondo, Pritzker and Adams with 1%; Murphy with 0%)	21%
Harvard/Harris	January 19–20, 2022	672 (RV)	6%	–	7%	17%	–	23%	2%	3%	–	–	6%	12%	7%	–	–	17%
McLaughlin & Associates	January 13–18, 2022	463 (LV)	6%	4%	6%	9%	2%	16%	3%	2%	2%	22%	9%	–	–	–	4% (Note: Beto O'Rourke with 2%; Eric Adams and John Hickenlooper with 1%; Kirsten Gillibrand, Tim Kaine, Ilhan Omar, Deval Patrick, and Tom Steyer with 0%)	15%
Morning Consult	December 11–13, 2021	916 (RV)	–	5%	11%	–	–	31%	3%	–	3%	–	8%	–	8%	–	3% (Note: Cooper, Adams and Raimondo with 3%)	16%
Echelon Insights	December 9–13, 2021	479 (RV)	5%	6%	7%	–	–	33%	3%	2%	1%	–	5%	14%	8%	2%	2% (Note: Gabbard with 1%; Beshear and Sinema with 0%)	8%
Harvard/Harris	November 30 – December 2, 2021	1,989 (RV)	5%	5%	8%	–	–	31%	5%	–	–	–	7%	15%	7%	2%	14% (Note: Other/Don't know with 14%)	–
Hill-HarrisX	November 18–19, 2021	939 (RV)	4%	3%	5%	–	–	26%	3%	–	4%	15%	5%	7%	2%	1%	10% (Note: "Someone else" with 3%; Michael Bloomberg and Beto O'Rourke with 2%; Sherrod Brown, Andrew Yang, and Katie Porter with 1%)	16%
Echelon Insights	November 12–18, 2021	458 (LV)	6%	6%	8%	–	–	29%	2%	1%	2%	–	5%	16%	6%	0%	0% (Note: "Someone else", Andy Beshear, Tulsi Gabbard and Kyrsten Sinema with 0%)	16%
McLaughlin & Associates	November 11–16, 2021	450 (LV)	5%	3%	8%	–	2%	22%	5%	–	–	23%	5%	–	–	–	32% (Note: Beto O'Rourke with 3%, other with 29%)	–
YouGov/Yahoo News	October 19–21, 2021	671 (A)	7%	–	9%	–	–	22%	–	–	–	–	7%	12%	8%	–	4% (Note: Sherrod Brown with 4%)	31%
Echelon Insights	October 15–19, 2021	533 (LV)	5%	4%	9%	–	–	23%	4%	1%	3%	–	5%	16%	6%	0%	2% (Note: "Someone else" and Tulsi Gabbard with 1%; Andy Beshear and Kyrsten Sinema with 0%)	20%
McLaughlin & Associates	October 14–18, 2021	473 (LV)	5%	3%	9%	–	2%	29%	3%	2%	2%	18%	7%	–	–	–	8% (Note: Beto O'Rourke with 3%; Kirsten Gillibrand, John Hickenlooper, Tim Kaine, Deval Patrick and Tom Steyer with 1%; Ilhan Omar with 0%)	14%
McLaughlin & Associates	September 9–14, 2021	476 (LV)	5%	4%	7%	–	2%	29%	3%	–	2%	17%	7%	–	–	–	6% (Note: Beto O'Rourke with 3%, Kirsten Gillibrand, Deval Patrick and Tom Steyer with 1%; John Hickenlooper, Tim Kaine and Ilhan Omar with 0%)	17%
Echelon Insights	August 13–18, 2021	514 (RV)	6%	6%	11%	–	–	33%	2%	–	2%	–	8%	–	5%	1%	8% (Note: O'Rourke and Yang with 2%; Besehar, Gabbard, and Gillibrand with 1%; Sinema with 0%)	18%
McLaughlin & Associates	July 29 – August 3, 2021	467 (LV)	4%	5%	8%	4%	–	28%	2%	–	2%	16%	7%	–	–	10% (Note: Andrew Yang with 4%; John Hickenlooper and Beto O'Rourke with 2%; Kirsten Gillibrand and Tim Kaine with 1%; Ilhan Omar with 0%)	14%	
YouGov/Yahoo News	July 30 – August 2, 2021	697 (A)	4%	–	6%	–	–	44%	–	–	–	–	4%	10%	6%	–	18% (Note: Sherrod Brown with 2%)	20%
McLaughlin & Associates	June 16–20, 2021	463 (LV)	5%	3%	4%	–	2%	31%	3%	–	1%	19%	5%	–	–	–	11% (Note: Beto O'Rourke and Andrew Yang with 3%; John Hickenlooper with 2%; Tim Kaine, Deval Patrick and Ilhan Omar with 1%)	16%
McLaughlin & Associates	May 12–18, 2021	459 (LV)	4%	4%	6%	–	1%	35%	3%	–	2%	16%	7%	–	–	–	11% (Note: Tim Kaine, Beto O'Rourke, Deval Patrick, and Andrew Yang with 2%; Kirsten Gillibrand, John Hickenlooper and Ilhan Omar with 1%)	13%
Trafalgar Group	April 30 – May 6, 2021	– (LV) (Note: Democratic subsample of full sample of 1,574 likely voters)	–	–	9%	–	–	41%	5%	–	–	–	8%	–	–	–	36% (Note: "Someone else" with 26%; Beto O'Rourke with 4%, Andrew Yang with 3%, Julian Castro with 2%; John Bel Edwards with 1%)	–
McLaughlin & Associates	April 8–13, 2021	458 (LV)	–	4%	5%	–	2%	34%	4%	–	2%	20%	3%	–	–	–	13% (Note: Andrew Yang with 4%, Kirsten Gillibrand, John Hickenlooper and Beto O'Rourke with 2%; Tim Kaine, Ilhan Omar, and Deval Patrick with 1%)	12%
McLaughlin & Associates	February 24–28, 2021	443 (LV)	–	4%	7%	–	1%	28%	3%	–	–	23%	8%	–	–	12% (Note: Andrew Yang with 4%, John Hickenlooper and Beto O'Rourke with 2%; Tim Kaine, Kirsten Gillibrand, Ilhan Omar, and Deval Patrick with 1%; Gavin Newsom with 0%)	14%	
	January 20, 2021	Inauguration of Joe Biden																
McLaughlin & Associates	December 9–13, 2020	445 (LV)	–	3%	5%	–	5%	25%	2%	–	–	29%	7%	–	–	–	8% (Note: John Hickenlooper with 3%; Tim Kaine with 2%; Kirsten Gillibrand, Ilhan Omar and Deval Patrick with 1%)	18%
McLaughlin & Associates/Newsmax	November 21–23, 2020	445 (LV)	–	2%	6%	–	5%	29%	2%	–	–	23%	6%	–	–	–	5% (Note: Kirsten Gillibrand, John Hickenlooper, Tim Kaine, Ilhan Omar, and Deval Patrick with 1%)	23%
	November 3, 2020	2020 presidential election																
McLaughlin & Associates	November 2–3, 2020	461 (LV)	–	2%	8%	–	8%	18%	–	–	–	25%	6%	–	–	–	6% (Note: John Hickenlooper with 3%; Kirsten Gillibrand, Tim Kaine and Deval Patrick with 1%)	28%
Léger	August 4–7, 2020	1,007 (LV)	6%	7%	14%	–	20%	13%	6%	–	8%	–	9%	6%	–	–	24% (Note: Andrew Yang with 14%, Beto O'Rourke with 6%, Kirsten Gillibrand with 4%)	
Léger	August 4–7, 2020	390 (LV)	6%	6%	16%	–	21%	19%	6%	–	–	–	9%	–	–	–	17% (Note: Andrew Yang with 8%, Beto O'Rourke with 6%, Kirsten Gillibrand with 3%)	–

== Notes ==
Partisan clients
