= 2024 Mississippi Democratic presidential primary =

- March 12, 2024

40 delegates (35 pledged, 5 unpledged) to the Democratic National Convention
Candidate	Joe Biden
Home state	Delaware
Delegate count	35
Popular vote	91,053
Percentage	98.7%
County results
Biden
>90%

The 2024 Mississippi Democratic presidential primary took place on March 12, 2024, as part of the Democratic Party primaries for the 2024 presidential election, alongside the Georgia and Washington and Northern Mariana Islands primaries. 35 delegates to the Democratic National Convention were allocated in an open primary, with 5 additional unpledged delegates.

Incumbent President Joe Biden was the only candidate that met the requirements to appear on the ballot. He won without any significant opposition from write-in votes.

== Candidates ==
In Mississippi, candidates had to pay a filing fee of $2,500 and gather at least 500 signatures to make the primary ballot. The only presidential candidate on the ballot in Mississippi was President Joe Biden. Voters could also vote for a write-in candidate in the primary, although those votes would not have to be counted according to state law.

== Results ==
The elections office of the Secretary of State did not publish any other votes than Biden's final 91,053 votes. NBC News was the only delegate tracking medium, which included the write-in votes but without updating it to the final result. The tracker on CNN indicated that they updated the final result for Biden, but at the same time retained the previous number for write-ins of 1,187 votes unchanged, as the calculated margin for Biden would show the same amount of write-ins as NBC.

2024 Mississippi Democratic pres. primary
Candidate	Votes	%	Delegates
Joe Biden (incumbent)	91,053	98.71	35
Write-in votes (Note: The actual final amount was not known.)	1,187	1.29	—
Total	92,240	100%	35

== See also ==
- 2024 United States presidential election
- 2024 Democratic Party presidential primaries
- 2024 United States presidential election in Mississippi
- 2024 Mississippi Republican presidential primary
- 2024 United States elections
