= 2024 Washington Democratic presidential primary =

- March 12, 2024

111 delegates (92 pledged, 19 unpledged) to the Democratic National Convention

Candidate	Joe Biden	Uncommitted Delegates
Home state	Delaware	–
Delegate count	90	2
Popular vote	763,739	89,764
Percentage	83.5%	9.8%
- Biden 70–80% 80–90%

The 2024 Washington Democratic presidential primary was held on March 12, 2024, as part of the Democratic Party primaries for the 2024 presidential election, alongside the Georgia, Mississippi and Northern Mariana Islands primaries. 92 delegates to the Democratic National Convention were allocated, with 19 additional unpledged delegates.

President Joe Biden succeeded over the option for "Uncommitted Delegates" and challengers Marianne Williamson and Dean Phillips. Almost 10% of the vote went for those uncommitted delegates, winning two district delegates from Washington's 7th congressional district.

== Candidates ==
The Washington Secretary of State confirmed that the following names would be placed on the March 12 primary ballot:

- Joe Biden
- Dean Philips (withdrawn)
- Marianne Williamson

=== Campaign for "uncommitted delegates" ===
After a push for Michigan Democratic primary voters to vote for the "uncommitted delegates" option garnered over 100,000 votes in protest to President Biden's handling of the Gaza war, momentum for Washington voters by activists and politicians to also select "uncommitted delegates" grew, as a number of organizations and officials endorsed a vote for uncommitted.

== Endorsements ==
Joe Biden

U.S. Senators

- Patty Murray (1993–present), President pro tempore of the Senate (2023–present)

U.S. Representatives

- Pramila Jayapal, WA-07 (2017–present), Chair of the Congressional Progressive Caucus (2021–present)

Attorney General

- Bob Ferguson, Washington (2013–present)
Uncommitted Delegates

Newspapers

- The Stranger

Labor unions

- American Federation of Teachers Seattle Local 1789
- UAW Local 4121
- Washington chapter of the United Food and Commercial Workers

State senators

- Yasmin Trudeau, State Senator from LD-27

Local officials

- Rami Al-Kabra, Bothell Deputy Mayor and City Councilmember at-large (2021–present)
- Olgy Diaz, at-large Tacoma City Councilmember (2022–present)
- Teresa Mosqueda, King County Councilmember from District 8 (2024–present) and former at-large Seattle City Councilmember (2017–2024)

Organizations

- Council on American–Islamic Relations Action
- Seattle chapter and national organization of the Democratic Socialists of America
- IfNotNow Seattle
- Jewish Voice for Peace Action
- Our Revolution
- Progressive Democrats of America

Notable individuals

- Bikini Kill, punk rock band
- Ijeoma Oluo, writer
- Linda Sarsour, political activist and co-chair of the 2017 Women's March
- Shaun Scott, filmmaker and activist

== Results ==
2024 Washington Democratic pres. primary
Candidate	Votes	%	Delegates
Joe Biden (incumbent)	763,739	83.47	90
Uncommitted Delegates	89,764	9.81	2
Marianne Williamson	25,308	2.77	0
Dean Phillips (withdrawn)	25,190	2.75	0
Write-in votes	10,966	1.20	—
Total	914,967	100%	92

== See also ==
- 2024 Washington Republican presidential primary
- 2024 Democratic Party presidential primaries
- 2024 United States presidential election
- 2024 United States presidential election in Washington
- 2024 United States elections
