= Joe Biden 2024 presidential campaign =

American political campaign

Biden for President 2024
- Campaign: 2024 U.S. presidential election 2024 Democratic primaries
- Candidate: Joe Biden; 46th President of the United States; (2021–2025); Kamala Harris; 49th Vice President of the United States; (2021–2025)
- Affiliation: Democratic Party
- Status: Announced: April 25, 2023; Presumptive nominee: March 12, 2024; Suspended: July 21, 2024 (Note: Committee carried over to the Harris campaign following his withdrawal from the race.); Left office: January 20, 2025
- Headquarters: Wilmington, Delaware
- Key people: Julie Chávez Rodriguez (manager); Jen O'Malley Dillon (campaign chairwoman); Mike Donilon (chief strategist); Quentin Fulks (principal deputy campaign manager); Lisa Blunt Rochester (co-chair); Jim Clyburn (co-chair); Chris Coons (co-chair); Tammy Duckworth (co-chair); Jeffrey Katzenberg (co-chair); Gretchen Whitmer (co-chair); Cedric Richmond (co-chair); Nancy Pelosi (chair, national advisory board)
- Receipts: US$210,851,151.58 (April 30, 2024)
- Slogan(s): Together, We Will Defeat Trump Again; Finish the Job; Let's Go Joe

Website
- joebiden.com (archived - May 1, 2024)

Joe Biden, the 46th president of the United States, announced his candidacy for re-election for a second presidential term on April 25, 2023, confirming that Vice President Kamala Harris would remain as his running mate. After winning the Democratic primaries, he faced off against the Republican Party ticket of 45th president Donald Trump and junior Ohio senator JD Vance. Biden ultimately withdrew from the race on July 21, 2024 due to concerns about his health and age, and low polling and approval numbers; he immediately endorsed Harris to replace him as the party's presidential nominee, who went on to lose the general election to Trump.

Biden made protecting American democracy a central focus of his campaign, along with restoring the federal right to abortion following the Supreme Court's overturning of Roe v. Wade. He also intended to increase funding for border patrol and security, and increase funding for law enforcement coupled with police reform. Biden promised to support, protect and expand LGBT rights and frequently touted his previous passage of the Infrastructure Investment and Jobs Act, the Chips and Science Act, and the Inflation Reduction Act's landmark investment to combat climate change.

Biden made strengthening U.S. alliances a key goal of his foreign policy and promised to continue supporting Ukraine following the Russian invasion of the country and Israel following their Gaza war, describing them as "vital" to U.S. national security interests. Biden promised to continue efforts to tackle gun violence and defend the Affordable Care Act following comments from Trump suggesting he would repeal the law. He proposed increasing taxes on the wealthy through a "billionaire minimum income tax" to reduce the deficit and fund social services for the poor. Biden's trade policy was described as rejecting traditional neoliberal economic policy and the Washington Consensus that resulted in the offshoring of manufacturing and populist backlash. It included targeted tariffs against strategic Chinese industries to protect manufacturing jobs and counter China's technological and military ambitions.

On March 12, 2024, Biden became the presumptive nominee of the Democratic Party after clinching enough delegates in Georgia, and easily defeating his primary challengers such as Representative Dean Phillips. The first presidential debate was held on June 27, 2024, between Biden and Trump. Biden's performance was widely criticized, with commentators saying that he frequently lost his train of thought and gave meandering answers. Several newspaper columnists declared Trump the winner of the debate, which was supported by polling results. After the debate, concerns about his health intensified, and Biden faced many calls to withdraw from the race, including from fellow Democrats and the editorial boards of several major news outlets.

Biden initially refused calls to drop out from the race and insisted that he would remain a candidate. However, on July 21, 2024, Biden ultimately ended his re-election campaign and immediately endorsed Vice President Kamala Harris to replace him in his place as the presidential nominee. Harris quickly launched her own presidential campaign later that day. On the next day, Harris secured enough non-binding endorsements of the uncommitted delegates that had previously been pledged to Biden to make her the new presumptive Democratic presidential nominee.

== Background ==
This was Biden's fourth presidential campaign, and was his first as the incumbent. His first campaign was in the 1988 Democratic Party presidential primaries. While he was initially considered one of the strongest candidates in that race, a scandal broke soon thereafter when news reports uncovered plagiarism by Biden in law school records and in speeches. This revelation led to his withdrawal from the race in September 1987.

He made a second attempt during the 2008 Democratic Party presidential primaries. Like his first presidential bid, Biden failed to garner a sufficient level of endorsements and support. He withdrew from the race after his poor performance in the Iowa caucus on January 3, 2008. He was eventually chosen to be the running mate of the party's nominee Barack Obama. Following the Obama/Biden ticket's victory in the general election, Biden was sworn in as vice president of the United States on January 20, 2009. He ran again as Obama's running mate in 2012 and was re-elected vice president, being sworn in for second term on January 20, 2013, and serving until January 20, 2017.

Biden's third presidential bid came during the 2020 Democratic Party presidential primaries where he focused his plans as the candidate with the best chance of defeating then-president Donald Trump in the general election. Politico reported in 2018 that Biden had rejected a proposition to commit to serving only one term as president.

In May 2021, Biden's chief of staff Ron Klain indicated the Biden administration was "anticipating a bruising general election matchup" against Donald Trump, who had served as the 45th president of the United States and had been defeated by Biden in the 2020 presidential election, if the latter followed through on a bid to return to the presidency. In November 2021, against a backdrop of declining approval ratings, the Biden White House reiterated Biden's intent to run for reelection. In a March 2022 press conference, when asked about the possibility that Trump could be his opponent in 2024, Biden replied, "I'd be very fortunate if I had that same man running against me".

In a PBS NewsHour/NPR/Marist poll released on April 25, 2023 – the day Biden announced his reelection campaign – his approval rating was just 41%, with a disapproval rating of 50%. Several polls both before and after Biden's campaign announcement showed that most Democrats wanted the party to nominate someone other than Biden for president in the 2024 election.

== Campaign ==
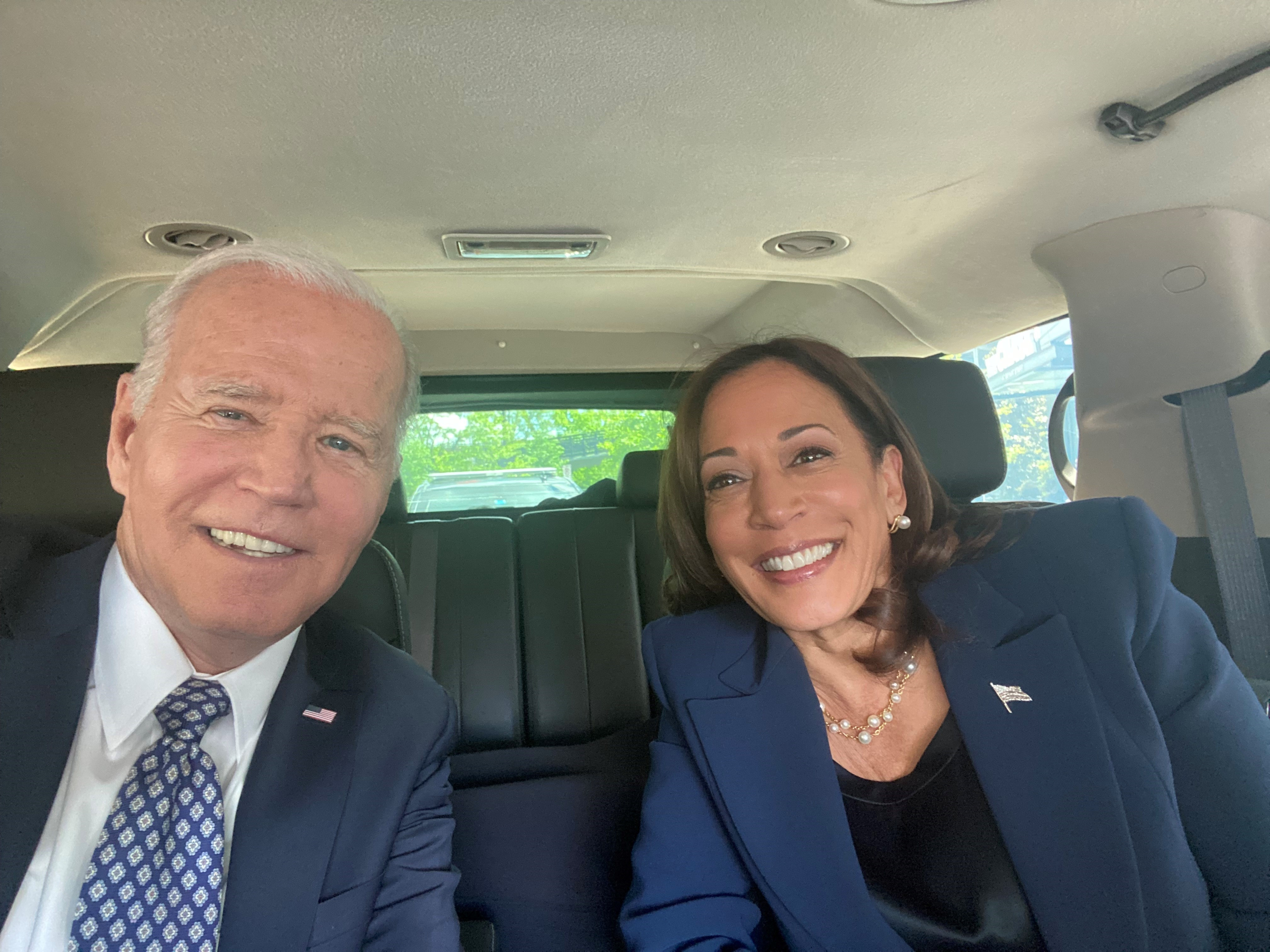
Biden and Harris, May 2023

=== Announcement ===
On April 25, 2023, Biden announced he was running for re-election. It was also announced that Julie Chávez Rodriguez would serve as campaign manager and Quentin Fulks would be principal deputy campaign manager. Lisa Blunt Rochester, Jim Clyburn, Chris Coons, Tammy Duckworth, Jeffrey Katzenberg, and Gretchen Whitmer were named national campaign co-chairs. Biden's campaign was launched four years to the day after the start of his 2020 presidential campaign. Politico reported that: "Biden is considering Michael Tyler (the longtime Democratic operative) for the role of communications director in his 2024 campaign".

Biden formally kicked off his reelection campaign on June 17, 2023, at a union rally in Philadelphia, Pennsylvania.

=== Social media activity ===
The Biden campaign created an account on Truth Social in October 2023. They announced on the social media platform X (formerly Twitter) that they had created the account on Truth Social because they found the idea "very funny". Numerous observers characterised this as an exercise by the Biden campaign in trolling Donald Trump.

In May 2024, the Biden campaign posted a listing for a full-time Content and Meme Pages Partner Manager. The job description stated, "In this role, you will initiate and manage day-to-day operations in engaging the internet's top content and meme pages". The Meme Manager will be a first for a presidential campaign.

=== National advisory board ===
The Biden-Harris 2024 national advisory board consisted of:

- Mayor Karen Bass of Los Angeles, California
- Representative Joyce Beatty of Ohio
- Representative Ami Bera of California
- Senator Cory Booker of New Jersey
- Representative Brendan Boyle of Pennsylvania
- Representative Shontel Brown of Ohio
- Representative Nikki Budzinski of Illinois
- Governor John Carney of Delaware
- Senator Tom Carper of Delaware
- Governor Roy Cooper of North Carolina
- Representative Diana DeGette of Colorado
- Mayor Andre Dickens of Atlanta, Georgia
- Mayor Mike Duggan of Detroit, Michigan
- Representative Maxwell Frost of Florida
- Mayor Kate Gallego of Phoenix, Arizona
- Representative Sylvia Garcia of Texas
- Governor Maura Healey of Massachusetts
- County Judge Lina Hidalgo of Texas
- Governor Kathy Hochul of New York
- Representative Chrissy Houlahan of Pennsylvania
- State Senator Shevrin Jones of Florida
- Representative Ro Khanna of California
- Senator Amy Klobuchar of Minnesota
- Governor Ned Lamont of Connecticut
- Governor Michelle Lujan Grisham of New Mexico
- Mayor Vi Lyles of Charlotte, North Carolina
- Representative Jennifer McClellan of Virginia
- Representative Grace Meng of New York
- Governor Wes Moore of Maryland
- Senator Chris Murphy of Connecticut
- Governor Phil Murphy of New Jersey
- Representative Joe Neguse of Colorado
- Governor Gavin Newsom of California
- Senator Alex Padilla of California
- Former Speaker of the House Nancy Pelosi of California
- Governor J. B. Pritzker of Illinois
- Mayor Aftab Pureval of Cincinnati, Ohio
- Governor Josh Shapiro of Pennsylvania
- County Supervisor Hilda Solis of California
- Mayor Levar Stoney of Richmond, Virginia
- Representative Lauren Underwood of Illinois
- Senator Raphael Warnock of Georgia
- Senator Elizabeth Warren of Massachusetts

== Platform ==
Biden frequently stated his intention to "finish the job" as a campaign theme and political rallying cry. Biden was described as a political moderate and centrist, and during the campaign was seeking to attract moderate Republicans and independents for his 2024 reelection bid.

=== Abortion access ===
Biden was described as running on one of the most overtly abortion rights platform of any general election candidate in political history. Biden promised to restore Roe v. Wade if reelected, and criticized court rulings limiting abortion access or restricting the availability of abortion pills.

=== Democracy ===
Biden made defending American democracy the cornerstone of his presidential campaign, stating during a speech on January 5, 2024, "the defense, protection and preservation of American democracy will remain, as it has been, the central cause of my presidency." Biden frequently called attention to Trump's former attempts to overturn the 2020 United States presidential election and its culmination in the January 6 United States Capitol attack, widely described as an attempted coup d'état or self-coup. Trump has claimed that Joe Biden is the "destroyer" and real threat to democracy, and has repeated false claims that the 2020 election was rigged and stolen from him, of which there has been no evidence.

Joe Biden framed the 2024 election as a battle for democracy and defending the "soul of America," which echoes Biden's framing of current geopolitics as "the battle between democracy and autocracy." Joe Biden previously cited democracy and "a battle for the soul of our nation" as a key message of his successful 2020 run, and repeatedly touched on the issue of democracy since announcing his candidacy for the 2020 presidential election.

=== Economy and trade ===
Biden dubbed his economic policy "Bidenomics" and promised to create middle-class jobs and reject trickle-down economics. For his 2024 reelection campaign, Biden pointed to his previous passage of the Infrastructure Investment and Jobs Act, the Chips and Science Act, and the Inflation Reduction Act; all of which are expected to invest $1 to $2 trillion in industrial policy over 10 years. Biden previously passed the American Rescue Plan Act to speed up the economic recovery following the COVID-19 pandemic and subsequent recession.

Biden's trade agenda was described as rejecting traditional neoliberal economic policies and the Washington Consensus in favor of de-risking supply chains from China and economic investment in target nations to address pandemic resilience, climate change, U.N. Sustainable Development Goals and the rejection of Chinese-style autocracy. Biden's policies are expected to increase public-private partnerships through the World Bank and IMF to compete with China's Belt and Road Initiative. Biden stated his intention to reverse neoliberal policies that resulted in the offshoring of manufacturing and thus resulted in increased populist backlash. Biden enacted several targeted tariffs against China in strategic sectors such as EVs, solar cells, steel, and aluminum to protect American manufacturing and blunt China's technological and military ambitions.

=== Education ===
Biden previously supported two-years of free community college during his 2020 campaign, and has continued to propose it in yearly budget requests despite failing to have it pass during negotiations with Republicans as part of his Build Back Better Plan in 2021. Biden promised to triple Title I funding, and as of the end of 2023, managed an 11% increase totaling $2 billion for Title I along with increased funding for Pell Grants and $7.3 billion in investments for HBCU's.

Biden has stated he opposes book bans and has promised to appoint an anti-book ban coordinator to address the issue. Biden has stated that attacks on teachers for talking about race and racism is wrong, and has opposed Florida's Parental Rights in Education Act. Biden supports protections for transgender students while also allowing school districts to restrict transgender women in competitive women's sports through updating Title IX protections.

Biden continues to support student loan relief and had made it a promise of his initial 2020 campaign, and previously attempted a $400 billion student debt relief plan that was ruled unconstitutional by the Supreme Court. Biden has since implemented a more modest income-driven $39 billion debt relief plan impacting 800,000 borrowers who had paid their loans over 20 years, and waived some rules regarding the Public Service Loan Forgiveness program that resulted in an additional 662,000 people having some debt canceled. On January 12, 2024, Biden announced debt relief under the Saving on a Valuable Education (SAVE) repayment plan to wipe loans up to $12,000 that have been in repayment for 10 years or more, along with additional measures to take effect in July to limit payments to 5% of discretionary income from the previous 10%. As of the end of 2023, Biden has canceled $132 billion worth of student loans affecting 3.6 million borrowers despite the Supreme Court's prior ruling. On January 19, 2024, Biden canceled another $4.9 billion in student loan debt for 73,600 borrowers. On March 21, 2024, Biden announced an additional $5.8 billion in loan relief for 77,700 borrowers through the Public Service Loan Forgiveness program. On April 12, 2024, Biden announced another $7.4 billion in student loan relief affecting roughly 277,000 borrowers.

=== Energy, environment, and climate change ===
Biden stated he believes in human-caused climate change. Biden previously strengthened environmental protections that had been weakened during the Trump administration. Biden passed the Inflation Reduction Act, the largest investment in addressing climate change and clean energy in US history with over $375 billion in funding and putting the US on track to meet emissions reduction targets by 50-52% below 2005 levels by 2030, and has created 170,600 new clean energy jobs with over $278 billion in new investments in 44 states. Biden has stated his intention to use both regulation and market forces to address climate change, and has established clean energy tax credits and subsidies for electric cars, heat-pumps, and climate friendly technology.

In addition to record funding for clean energy, Biden has overseen a record in US crude oil production with over 13.2 million barrels of crude per day, beating Saudi Arabia and Russia by millions of barrels and the 13 million barrels per day produced at the peak of Trump's presidency. Biden has previously stated his intention to lower prices at the gas pump, which experts believe is key to his 2024 reelection campaign. Biden's first term dealt with supply shocks caused by the 2021-2024 global energy crisis due to the COVID-19 pandemic and Russian invasion of Ukraine.

=== Foreign policy ===
Biden has been described as presiding over "the most transformative phase in U.S. foreign policy in decades," and has made strengthening American alliances to ensure a "position of trusted leadership" among allies to counter Russia and China, and ensuring that no other world power should surpass the United States in the military and economic spheres a focus of his presidency. Biden noticeably sought to reduce U.S. military presence in the Greater Middle East, and withdrew troops from Afghanistan after which the Taliban seized control. Biden has made strengthening the NATO alliance and preparing for great power competition a cornerstone of his first term in office, and has promised to defend the NATO alliance during his second term following reported comments that Trump told European Commission President Ursula von der Leyen that America would "never come to help you and to support you" if Europe was attacked. Biden has described modern geopolitics as "the battle between democracy and autocracy." Biden has promised to continue supporting Ukraine following the Russian invasion of Ukraine and Israel following the 2023 Hamas-led attack on Israel, describing them as "vital" to U.S. national security interests. By March 2024, Biden has become increasingly critical of Israeli Prime Minister Benjamin Netanyahu and the humanitarian crisis in Gaza, and has authorized air drops of aid and announced the construction of a military port to facilitate the delivery of aid to the enclave.

=== Gun violence ===
Biden promised to tackle gun violence through enacting universal background checks and increasing scrutiny of sales in gun shows and other unlicensed venues. Biden has also proposed implementing a ban on assault weapons. Biden was previously instrumental in passing the 1994 Federal Assault Weapons Ban that expired in 2004, and has spoken of its impacts on the campaign trail.

Biden stated his support of the First Step Act, red flag laws, increased background checks, the ability to bar people from carrying guns in schools and allowing gun manufacturers to be sued in court.

Biden previously announced the formation of the White House Office of Gun Violence Prevention, signed the first major gun control legislation in 30 years through the Bipartisan Safer Communities Act, and issued Executive Order 14092 to stiffen background checks, ensure safer firearms storage and provide additional direction for law enforcement agencies.

=== Immigration ===
Biden stated his intention to increase funding and resources for border patrol and enforcement, provide a path for people in the United States to apply for legal status and eventually citizenship, and create a smoother and expanded visa process for foreign graduates of American universities. Biden previously introduced the U.S. Citizenship Act of 2021 on his first day of office that stalled due to Republican opposition. Biden also issued a memorandum to reinstate the DACA program, overturned Trump's travel ban in Executive Order 13780, and reversed Trump's Executive Order 13768 that targeted sanctuary cities in the United States. The Biden administration has undertaken a policy of punishing migrants who enter the country illegally and providing temporary protections to migrants from certain countries such as Venezuela, Ukraine, Nicaragua, Cuba and Haiti. This has resulted in a total increase in migrants legally arriving at points of entry, and a decrease in migrants attempting to illegally cross the border.

In February 2024, Biden supported a bipartisan immigration bill to address the Mexico-United States border crisis that included many conservative demands and also unlocked aid to Ukraine and Israel. Trump successfully called on House and Senate Republicans to kill the bill arguing that it would hurt his and Republican's reelection campaigns and deny them the ability to run on immigration as an issue. Biden has since promised to campaign "every day" on Republican's refusal to pass the bill, stating that Donald Trump is the "only reason the border is not secure." On June 4, 2024, Biden passed an executive order to shut down the border if illegal crossings reached an average of 2,500 migrants a day in a given week.

=== Law enforcement ===
Biden ran on a pro-police message and has explicitly stated his opposition to the "defund the police" movement and Republican calls to "defund the FBI." Biden previously celebrated billions in funds for police departments in his 2022 State of the Union Address, and has provided hundreds of millions since then towards the hiring of additional police officers, school safety efforts, and community policing efforts. Biden has also called on police reform, stating in February 2023, "when police officers or police departments violate the public trust, they must be held accountable." During his first term, Biden restricted the transfer of military equipment to police, directed federal law enforcement to restrict chokeholds and no-knock warrants, ordered new use-of-force standards within the Justice Department and signed an executive order to create a national database of fired police officers. Biden has repeatedly pushed for community policing and violence intervention efforts and more mental and social services funding.

=== LGBT, civil, and voting rights ===
Biden stated he supports protecting the LGBT community and supports access to gender-affirming care. Biden previously passed the Respect for Marriage Act which protected same-sex and interracial marriage in the United States after a concurring opinion from Justice Clarence Thomas in Dobbs v. Jackson Women's Health Organization that suggested the court should revisit Obergefell v. Hodges.

Biden previously attempted to pass the George Floyd Justice in Policing Act in response to the George Floyd protests that ultimately failed after talks with Republican Senators broke down, resulting in Biden's passage of Executive Order 14074. Biden also passed the Emmett Till Antilynching Act to officially make lynching a federal hate crime.

Biden passed Executive Order 14019 to protect voting rights following Republican efforts to restrict voting following the 2020 presidential election, and attempted to pass the For the People Act to reduce the influence of money in politics, ban partisan gerrymandering, and create new federal ethics rules for officeholders that ultimately failed over opposition from Republican Senators.

=== Social services and healthcare ===
Biden promised to include the remaining pledges left out of his initial Build Back Better Act owing to resistance from Senators that ultimately resulted in the compromise Inflation Reduction Act. These include offering two years of free community college tuition, offering universal preschool and limiting the cost of childcare to 7% of income for most families. Biden has also signaled his intention to resuscitate the expanded child tax credit initially passed in the American Rescue Plan Act of 2021 to $3,000 for children over six and $3,600 to children under 6, which previously resulted in a roughly 30% reduction in child poverty.

Biden has promised to protect and defend the Affordable Care Act after Trump commented he would seek to replace the law if he wins a second term, and Republican senators expressed openness to repealing certain sections of the law. Biden has promised to defend Social Security and Medicare following comments made by Trump during a March 11, 2024, interview that suggested he was open to cutting the entitlement programs, which the Trump campaign later said was merely referring to "cutting waste." Biden has also signaled his intention to expand the price cap on the cost of insulin at $35 for Medicare recipients enacted as part of the Inflation Reduction Act to private insurance. Biden previously signed one of the largest expansions in veterans benefits in American history through the Honoring our PACT Act of 2022 that provided medical care for veterans exposed to toxic burn pits.

=== Taxes and deficit reduction ===
Biden shared plans to increase taxes on the wealthiest Americans to fund social services and reduce the deficit. Biden has proposed raising the top tax rate to 39.6%, the corporate tax rate to 28% and the stock buyback tax to 4%. Biden proposed a "Billionaire Minimum Income Tax" that would target one-hundredth of 1% of Americans (roughly 700 billionaires) that would raise over $361 billion over 10 years by ensuring the wealthy pay a minimum tax rate of 20%.

Biden previously implemented a 15% minimum tax on companies with annual income exceeding $1 billion. As part of the Inflation Reduction Act, Biden provided a one-time funding boost of $80 billion to the Internal Revenue Service to modernize its systems and hire additional staff to reduce an estimated $688 billion tax gap in uncollected payments by increasing audit rates of the wealthy and tax evaders. On January 12, 2024, the IRS announced it had collected more than $520 million in back taxes from delinquent high-income individuals, complex partnerships and large corporations due to increased funding from the Inflation Reduction Act.

== Campaign finances ==
=== Overall strategy ===
The Biden campaign was reported to plan to raise and spend $2 billion. To get around the $6,600 per donor, per year limitation to Biden's reelection campaign, the Biden campaign's financial strategy has involved closely working with the Democratic National Committee and establishing joint fundraising committees (JFC) with local state parties in all 50 states. As a result, individual donors can donate almost $1 million per year to be distributed to the DNC, local state parties, and the affiliated Biden Victory Fund. Biden's campaign previously gave the DNC its supporter and fundraising data after Inauguration Day in 2021. This approach has been noted to be different to former President Obama's use his own outside organization, Organizing for America, that ultimately competed for donors and left the DNC in debt. Biden was able to raise more cash than Trump early on due to establishing JFC's before Trump was able to due to having primary opponents until March.

=== Finances throughout the 2024 campaign ===
In summer and fall 2023, The Associated Press reported that Democrats were nervous about Biden's lack of fundraising and campaign activity. Of note were the 2023 Writers Guild and SAG-AFTRA strikes in California that prevented Biden from raising money from Hollywood figures owing to his pro-union stance. On January 15, 2024, Biden and the DNC reported taking in $97 million in the final three months of the year and after a December fundraising blitz, and announced that it took in $235 million from its launch in April 2023 and ended the year with $117 million cash on hand.

In early 2024, Biden's presidential campaign was noted to have a considerable fundraising and cash advantage over Trump in part due to his opponents contributions being diverted to cover his many legal fees. The Biden campaign reported raising $42 million in January with $130 million cash on hand, and raising $53 million in February ending the month with $155 million cash on hand. According to February FEC filings, Biden-aligned super PACs had $64 million cash on hand and $900 million has been pledged by Democratic groups and major unions. According to a March 28 Reuters article, large contributions made up 55% of Biden's support, compared to 65% of Trump's support.

On April 6, 2024, Biden lagged Trump in total fundraising for the first time, reporting a total April fundraising haul of $51 million compared to Trump's $76.2 million, much of which was raised at Trump's self-reported $50.5 million fundraiser at the house of billionaire John Paulson. The New York Times reported that Trump was widely expected to catch up in total fundraising once he secured the Republican nomination and signed a joint fundraising agreement with the RNC. Biden noticeably beat Trump in total cash on hand, having $84.5 million compared to Trump's $48 million, both figures not including PAC money. Biden's aides noted a lack of big fundraising events and the "grassroots fundraising machine" not yet starting were partly to blame for the lower April totals. In June, the Trump campaign reported a $141 million fundraising haul for May, beating Biden's $85 million haul. Trump and the RNC entered June with $235 million on hand compared to Biden's $212 million. The Trump campaign accredited the haul with the aftermath of his 34 felony convictions in May that raised $70 million in the 48 hours after the verdict and briefly crashed WinRed. Trump also received a $50 million donation from billionaire Timothy Mellon. Biden increased fundraising events in June, including a $30 million event in Los Angeles with Barack Obama and Hollywood celebrities, along with a $8 million backyard fundraiser at the home of Terry McAuliffe. The combination of Trump's improved fundraising and Biden's increased spending on television ads were noted to give Trump a cash advantage by summer 2024.

In the weeks following his widely considered poor debate performance on June 27, The New York Times reported that numerous large donors had "slammed their wallets closed" setting the campaign on track to raise half of what it had hoped for. Major Democratic donors to the pro-Biden Super PAC Future Forward were reported to be privately withholding $90 million in pledges unless Biden stepped down from the Democratic ticket. Following his withdrawal from the race, the Biden campaign's finances were transferred to the Kamala Harris 2024 presidential campaign.

== Campaign events ==
On January 5, 2024, Biden held his first campaign rally for the year. Described as an unofficial campaign kickoff near Valley Forge, Pennsylvania, the event previewed Biden's campaign theme of defending democracy and labeling Trump as a danger to democracy.

On January 8, 2024, Biden held his second campaign speech of the year at Mother Emanuel AME Church in Charleston, South Carolina, location of the 2015 Charleston church shooting, to speak against white supremacism and compared Donald Trump and his supporters to defeated Confederates after the Civil War supporting a "second lost cause" around denying the results of the 2020 election.

On March 28, 2024, Biden held a large campaign event with former Presidents Barack Obama and Bill Clinton at Radio City Music Hall in New York City and announced raising over $26 million, a record for a single political event.

On June 27, 2024, Biden debated Trump in the Joe Biden–Donald Trump 2024 presidential debate. Following the debate, CNN reported criticism of Biden's performance by some Democrats, with one Democratic strategist dubbing it a "disaster" and another as "nothing good". His performance led to an increase in questions over Biden's health and age, and whether or not he should remain as the presidential candidate for the Democratic Party.

== Democratic primaries ==
Biden faced opposition during the 2024 Democratic Party presidential primaries from U.S. Representative Dean Phillips. Phillips campaigned as a younger alternative to Biden, arguing that he would be a stronger opponent to Trump. Phillips cited poll numbers and the president's age as reasons to pass on the torch to a new generation. In public, Phillips was ridiculed. In private, others in the Democratic Party shared his concerns. On December 14, 2023, during an appearance on “Meet the Press NOW,” Phillips criticized Biden's candidacy, stating that “The president is not a threat to democracy, but running and suppressing other candidates is a threat when you are behind in the polls, like he is.” Phillips also added, “He's a good man and someone I respect. But this delusion that he can win is a threat to democracy.” On January 12, 2024, Phillips accused representatives of the Biden campaign of using access to pressure liberal media outlets into blackballing and not platforming him.

Biden was not on the ballot on January 23, New Hampshire primary, but won the state in a write-in campaign with 63.8% of the vote and strongly defeated Representative Phillips, who garnered 19.6% of the vote. Biden had wanted South Carolina to be the first primary, and won that state on February 3 with 96% of the vote. Biden received 89.3% of the vote in Nevada and 81.1% of the vote in Michigan, with "None of these Candidates" and "Uncommitted" coming in second, respectively. On Super Tuesday 2024, Biden won 15 of 16 contests, netting 80% or more of the primary vote in 13 of the 16 contests. Biden lost the American Samoa contest to venture capitalist Jason Palmer, becoming the first incumbent president to lose a contest while appearing on the ballot since Jimmy Carter in 1980. On March 6, Representative Phillips suspended his campaign and endorsed Biden. On March 12, with wins in Georgia, Mississippi and Washington, Biden reached the 1,968 delegates needed to win the Democratic nomination, becoming the presumptive nominee.

=== Opposition among Arab and Muslim Americans ===
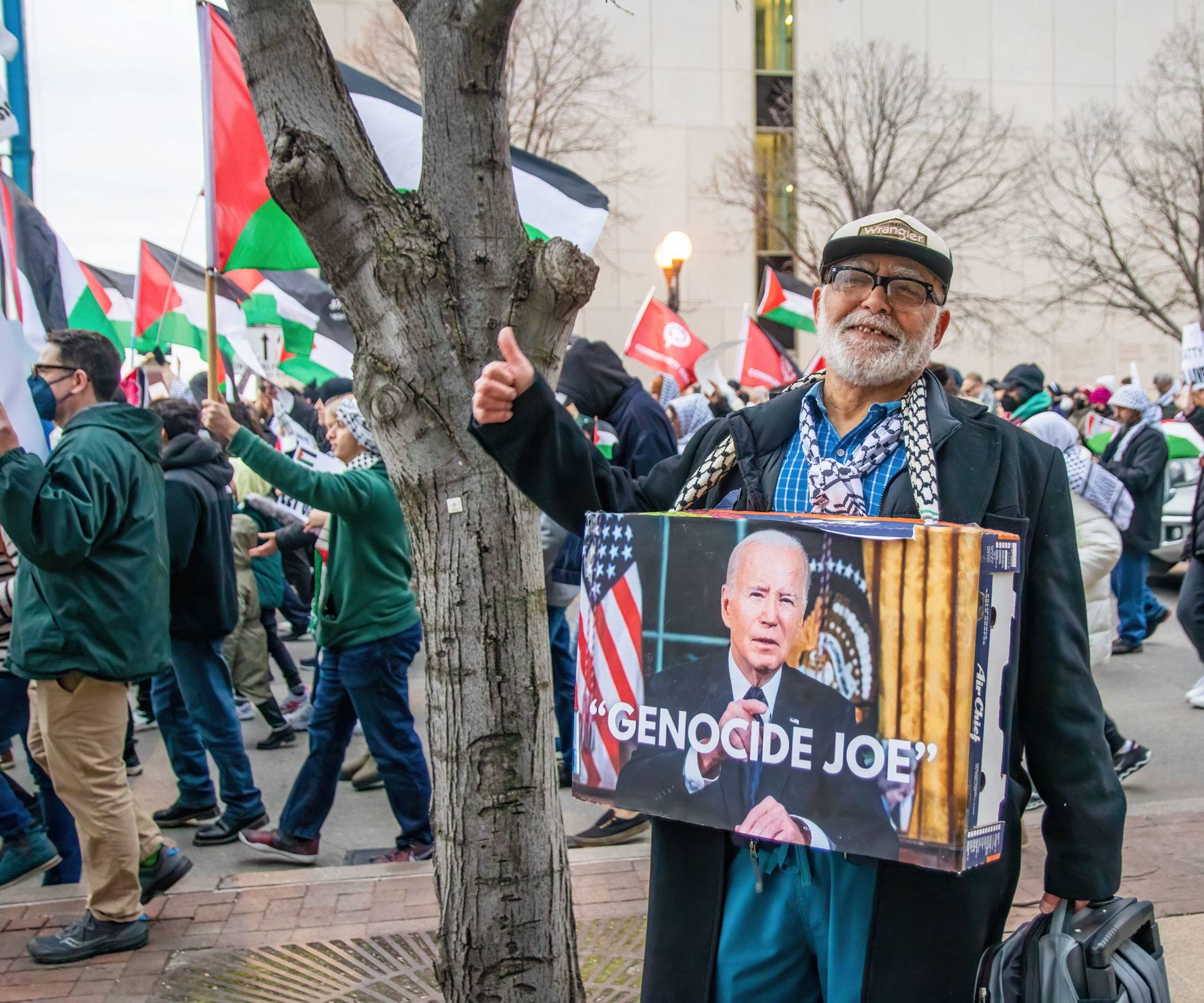
A protestor in Columbus, Ohio, carrying a sign referring to Biden as "Genocide Joe"

In reaction to the Biden administration's response to the Gaza war, a vocal minority of progressives, Muslim, and Arab American leaders have disrupted events and formed protest votes in swing states through the #AbandonBiden campaign, which encourages voters in the United States to not vote for Biden as a form of protest of his support for Israel. The organization leaders said they would not support Donald Trump, but would not vote for Biden either. On December 30, 2023, the #AbandonBiden campaign announced its countrywide expansion. James Zogby, president of the Arab American Institute, argued that Arab American opposition to Biden was due to his "insensitivity" to Palestinian suffering. Biden voiced support for the right to protest but criticized when they became violent or antisemitic.

Biden's support of Israel has prompted opposition from Muslim Americans and Arab Americans, particularly in Michigan, which has a large Muslim population and a large Arab population. Mayor Abdullah Hammoud of Dearborn refused to meet with Biden's campaign in January 2024 because he said the lives of Palestinians are not measured in poll numbers. Hammoud later joined 30 state legislators and members of the Wayne County Commission to put pressure on Biden. U.S. Representative Rashida Tlaib, the only Palestinian American in Congress, also called for Michigan Democrats to vote "uncommitted" in the state primary. Due to Michigan's status as a swing state, some analysts have said that Biden's support of Israel could cause him to lose not only the state, but also the election. Some major Democratic Party donors criticized Biden's policies in Gaza, saying they were imperiling his presidential bid. By May 2024, several progressive groups critical of Biden's Gaza policy began anti-Trump campaigns that were noted to indirectly help Biden.

== Withdrawal ==
=== Calls to withdraw ===
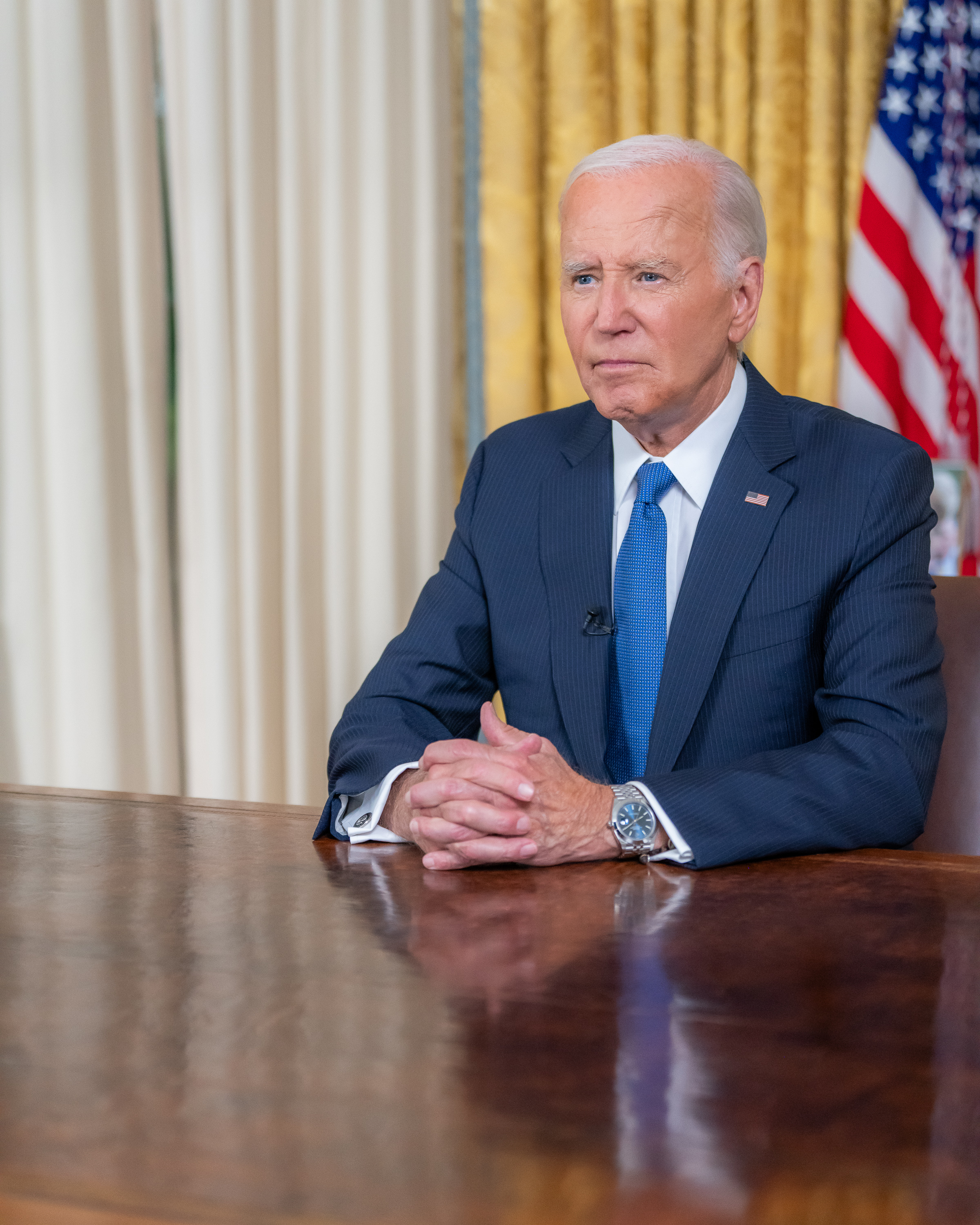
Biden announcing that he will not run for re-election

Biden faced calls from both pundits and fellow Democrats to withdraw from the race due to concerns about his health and age, his polling numbers against Republican presumptive nominee Donald Trump, and his low approval ratings, which have stayed below 44% since August 2021. On a couple of occasions during the 2020 campaign Biden called himself a "bridge candidate", leading some to believe he would not seek a second term. When Biden first took office at the age of 78 on January 20, 2021, he became the oldest person to have served as president of the United States. Calls from Biden supporters to step aside months or years before the debate were made by James Carville, Ezra Klein, and the Economist. On July 28, 2022, U.S. Representative Dean Phillips became the first incumbent Democratic member of Congress to say President Biden should not run for re-election and called for "generational change," pointing to Biden's age. Suggestions on who could replace Biden included Kamala Harris, and governors Gavin Newsom of California, Jared Polis of Colorado, J. B. Pritzker of Illinois, Josh Shapiro of Pennsylvania, and Gretchen Whitmer of Michigan.

On October 27, 2023, Minnesota Congressman Dean Phillips formally launched his presidential campaign for the Democratic nomination. Phillips argued during his campaign that the president would be a weak general election candidate due to his age and low approval ratings. On December 23, 2023, Phillips argued that Biden should “thoughtfully exit” the 2024 race. On January 18, 2024, Politico published an interview with Democratic Party presidential primary challenger Jason Palmer, in which he called on Biden and all older lawmakers to "pass the torch" to a younger generation of political leaders. Biden and his campaign deflected these concerns, demonstrating that he intended to stay in the race. Jaime Harrison, chairman of the Democratic National Committee, called the idea of replacing Biden "certifiably crazy" in a tweet in February 2024. By March 2024, the majority of Democratic officials, politicians, and strategists coalesced around Biden as their nominee, especially following his 2024 State of the Union Address.

After a widely perceived poor performance during the first 2024 presidential debate on June 27, several Democratic officials and political pundits called on Biden to step aside as the nominee. Other prominent Democrats, including former Presidents Barack Obama and Bill Clinton as well as Senators John Fetterman, Bernie Sanders, Tammy Duckworth, and Chris Coons rallied behind Biden, and resisted calls for him to step down due to one "bad debate." Other influential Democrats and the editorial boards including The New York Times, The Boston Globe, the Chicago Tribune, The New Yorker, The Economist and The Atlanta Journal-Constitution called for Biden to suspend his presidential campaign. The New Republic described a widespread view among voters that Biden should step aside.

Later in her book, 107 Days, Harris described that deferring to the Bidens to make the decision on their own to seek re-election was "recklessness".

Groups and individuals who publicly called for President Biden to end his campaign

Organizations

- Sunrise Movement

Newspapers and magazines

- The Atlanta Journal-Constitution
- The Boston Globe
- The Chicago Tribune
- The Economist
- The New York Times
- The New Yorker

=== Response by Biden ===
Biden repudiated any possibility of him dropping out, saying only "the Lord Almighty" could convince him to drop out in an interview with ABC News held on July 5, after the first debate. Biden further affirmed his intent on staying in the race at a campaign rally in Madison, Wisconsin. On July 5, Biden met with Democratic governors across the country with the majority saying he should also remain in the race. He wrote a letter to Congressional Democrats on July 8, reiterating that he would not end his candidacy. The same day, he called in to the MSNBC show Morning Joe and called for any prospective challengers to "run against me. Announce for president, challenge me at the convention.” On July 11, Biden responded to a question whether he would step aside if polling data showed Kamala had a better chance of beating Trump by saying that he would only step aside if he had zero chance of beating Trump.

==== Conferences ====
The Washington Post reported that U.S. Senator Mark Warner of Virginia was attempting to assemble a group of Democratic Senators to pressure Biden to withdraw from the race. On July 7, top Democrats, including minority house leader Hakeem Jeffries, held a rare party conference on the matter. On July 9, the full House Democratic Caucus and the Senate Democratic Caucus each held respective meetings to discuss Biden's place on the ticket.

On July 11, 2024, Biden held an hour-long solo press conference following the NATO 2024 Washington summit in order to demonstrate his capability to face Donald Trump in the 2024 election. Notably, Biden made two major political gaffes, mistakenly introducing Ukrainian President Volodymyr Zelenskyy as "President Putin", and then accidentally referring to Vice President Kamala Harris as "Vice President Trump." Later that evening House Minority Leader Hakeem Jeffries met with Biden expressing "the full breadth of insight, heartfelt perspectives and conclusions about the path forward that the Caucus" discussed earlier in the week.

On July 13, 2024, following the attempted assassination of Donald Trump, Biden campaign officials promised to limit public campaign messaging and take down all TV campaign advertisements as soon as possible.

=== Announcement of withdrawal ===
On July 21, following weeks of public and private pressure, Biden announced that he was withdrawing from the race, writing "It has been the greatest honor of my life to serve as your President. And while it has been my intention to seek reelection, I believe it is in the best interest of my party and the country for me to stand down and to focus solely on fulfilling my duties as President for the remainder of my term". He immediately endorsed Harris to replace him in his place as the party's presidential nominee.

My Fellow Americans,

Over the past three and a half years, we have made great progress as a Nation.

Today, America has the strongest economy in the world. We've made historic investments in rebuilding our Nation, in lowering prescription drug costs for seniors, and in expanding affordable health care to a record number of Americans. We've provided critically needed care to a million veterans exposed to toxic substances. Passed the first gun safety law in 30 years. Appointed the first African American woman to the Supreme Court. And passed the most significant climate legislation in the history of the world. America has never been better positioned to lead than we are today.

I know none of this could have been done without you, the American people. Together, we overcame a once in a century pandemic and the worst economic crisis since the Great Depression. We've protected and preserved our Democracy. And we've revitalized and strengthened our alliances around the world.

It has been the greatest honor of my life to serve as your President. And while it has been my intention to seek reelection, I believe it is in the best interest of my party and the country for me to stand down and to focus solely on fulfilling my duties as President for the remainder of my term.

I will speak to the Nation later this week in more detail about my decision.

For now, let me express my deepest gratitude to all those who have worked so hard to see me reelected. I want to thank Vice President Kamala Harris for being an extraordinary partner in all this work. And let me express my heartfelt appreciation to the American people for the faith and trust you have placed in me.

I believe today what I always have: that there is nothing America can't do - when we do it together. We just have to remember we are the United States of America.

— Joe Biden

On the evening of July 24, Biden addressed the nation from the Oval Office, explaining his decision to withdraw from the race, and outlining his priorities for the final months of his term.

== See also ==
- Joe Biden 2020 presidential campaign
- Donald Trump 2024 presidential campaign
- Kamala Harris 2024 presidential campaign
