= 2024 Northern Mariana Islands Democratic presidential primary =

- March 5–12, 2024

11 delegates (6 pledged, 5 unpledged) to the Democratic National Convention

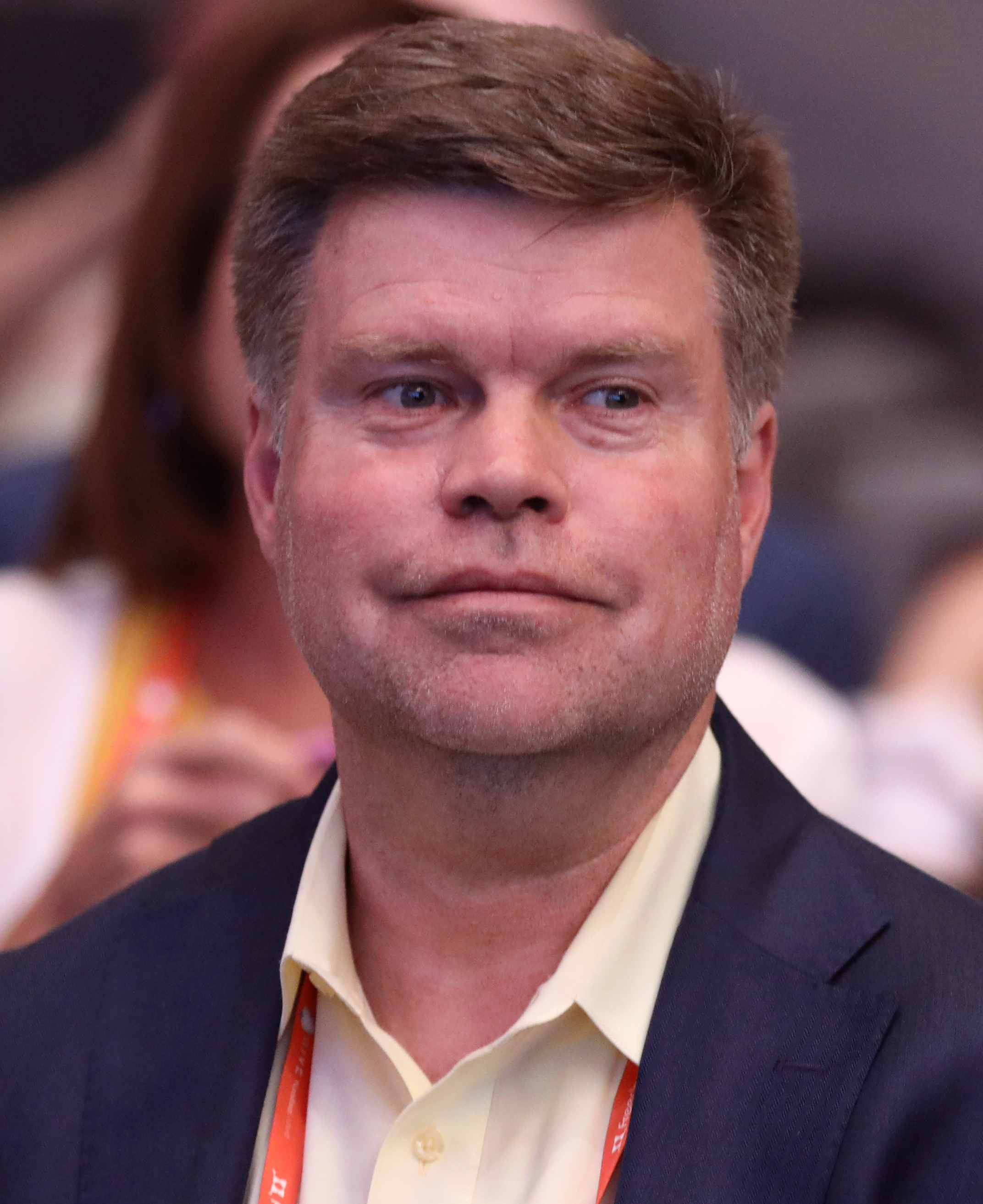
Candidate	Joe Biden	Jason Palmer
Home state	Delaware	Maryland
Delegate count	6	0
Popular vote	93	4
Percentage	93.9%	4.0%

The 2024 Northern Mariana Islands Democratic presidential primary took place from March 5, 2024, to March 12, 2024 at three different polling locations, as part of the Democratic Party primaries for the 2024 presidential election. In the party-run primary 6 delegates to the Democratic National Convention were allocated, with 5 additional unpledged delegates.

The territorial party held no caucus event in this year and went through seven days of voting to increase participation. Instead national convention delegates were selected directly on the primary ballot, similarly to the primary system in several liberal New England states. Candidates had to file with the party until 16 January.

Incumbent President Joe Biden won with minimal opposition. Jason Palmer had previously won the American Samoa caucus in an upset and had expressed excitement for the subsequent territorial contest, but he only received four votes.

== Results ==
2024 Northern Mariana Islands Democratic pres. primary
Candidate	Votes	%	Delegates
Joe Biden (incumbent)	93	93.94	6
Jason Palmer	4	4.04	0
Marianne Williamson	2	2.02	0
Dean Phillips (withdrawn)	0	0.00	0
Total	99	100%	6

== See also ==
- 2024 Northern Mariana Islands Republican presidential caucuses
- 2024 Democratic Party presidential primaries
- 2024 United States presidential election
- 2024 United States elections
