= 2024 Georgia Democratic presidential primary =

- March 12, 2024

123 delegates (108 pledged, 15 unpledged) to the Democratic National Convention

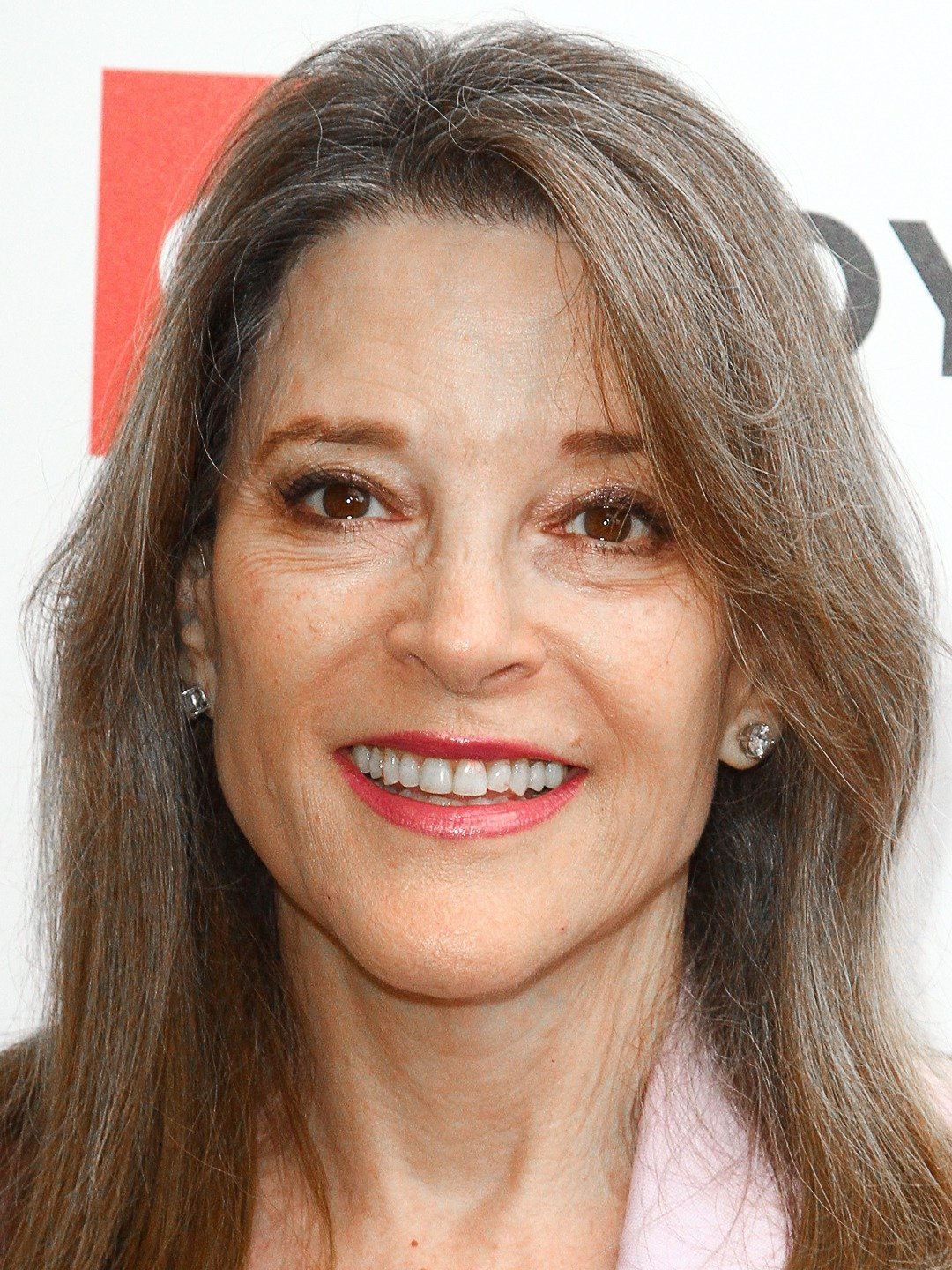
Candidate	Joe Biden	Marianne Williamson
Home state	Delaware	Washington, D.C.
Delegate count	108	0
Popular vote	276,141	8,673
Percentage	95.2%	3.0%
County results
Biden
80–90%
>90%

The 2024 Georgia Democratic presidential primary was held on March 12, 2024, as part of the Democratic Party primaries for the 2024 presidential election, alongside two more states and one territory. 108 delegates to the Democratic National Convention were allocated in an open primary, with additional 15 unpledged delegates.

Incumbent President Joe Biden had announced on April 25, 2023, his bid for a second term, and faced a primary challenge from author and 2020 presidential candidate Marianne Williamson and representative Dean Phillips. A protest movement inspired by the success of the Uncommitted National Movement was endorsed by multiple organizations protesting the Gaza war, encouraging voters to submit blank ballots, although the number of blank ballots was scarcely published in media and not listed as part of the official result.

Biden won the primary overwhelmingly, with around 93% and 276,141 votes (including in this case the portion of 2.2% or very roughly 6,500 blank ballot votes). Williamson had a result of 2.9% or 8,673 votes in second place. Not considering the blank ballots, the official results were a few fractions higher.

== Scheduling controversy ==
On February 4, 2023, the Democratic National Committee approved a new 2024 primary calendar, moving Georgia's primary ahead to February 13 on the fourth primary date sanctioned by the DNC. This vote was preceded by a December 2022 vote of the DNC Rules and Bylaws Committee, held after a letter from President Biden requesting the change was released. DNC members who supported this new plan said this would give a better representation of Democratic voters' preference during the early months of the campaign. Members of the Georgia Democratic Party noted that moving their primaries to comply with the new calendar would require changing Georgia state law that mandates the state to hold both the Democratic and Republican primaries on the same day. This was unlikely to happen since the state's legislature was controlled by Republicans. In May 2023, Georgia Republican Secretary of State Brad Raffensperger denied the DNC's request for a separate February date and scheduled the Georgia primaries for March 12. The DNC accepted this date, saying the state party showed a "good faith effort" to comply with the new calendar. Because state law prevented the earlier date, the DNC granted Georgia a waver and counted its delegates in full.

== Endorsements ==
Joe Biden

U.S. Senators

- Raphael Warnock, U.S. Senator from Georgia (2021–present)

U.S. Representatives

- Nikema Williams, U.S. Representative from GA-05 (2021–present), Chair of the Democratic Party of Georgia (2019–present)

Mayors

- Andre Dickens, 61st Mayor of Atlanta (2022–present)

Organizations

- Democratic Party of Georgia
Blank ballot

State legislators

- Ruwa Romman, State Representative from HD-97 (2023–present)

Organizations

- Council on American–Islamic Relations Action
- National organization and Atlanta chapter of the Democratic Socialists of America
- Jewish Voice for Peace Action

== Opinion polling ==
Poll source	Date(s) administered	Sample size (Note: Key: A – all adults RV – registered voters LV – likely voters V – unclear)	Margin of error	Joe Biden	Robert F. Kennedy Jr.	Dean Phillips	Marianne Williamson	Other	Undecided
	February 28, 2024	Williamson' re-entry in the primaries							
	February 7, 2024	Williamson withdraws from the primaries							
	October 27, 2023	Phillips declares his candidacy							
	October 9, 2023	Kennedy withdraws from the primaries							
Zogby Analytics	Sept 10–12, 2023	628 (LV)	± 3.9%	60%	13%	–	6%	–	21%

Hypothetical polling

Poll source	Date(s) administered	Sample size	Margin of error	Pete Buttigieg	Kamala Harris	Gavin Newsom	Other	Undecided
Phillips Academy	August 3–7, 2022	222 (LV)	–	25%	53%	8%	–	14%

== Results ==
2024 Georgia Democratic pres. primary
Candidate	Votes	%	Delegates
Joe Biden (incumbent)	276,141	95.19	108
Marianne Williamson	8,673	2.99	0
Dean Phillips (withdrawn)	5,271	1.82	0
Total	290,085	100%	108

== See also ==
- 2024 Georgia Republican presidential primary
- 2024 Democratic Party presidential primaries
- 2024 United States presidential election
- 2024 United States presidential election in Georgia
- 2024 United States elections
