= Travis May =

American entrepreneur (born 1987)

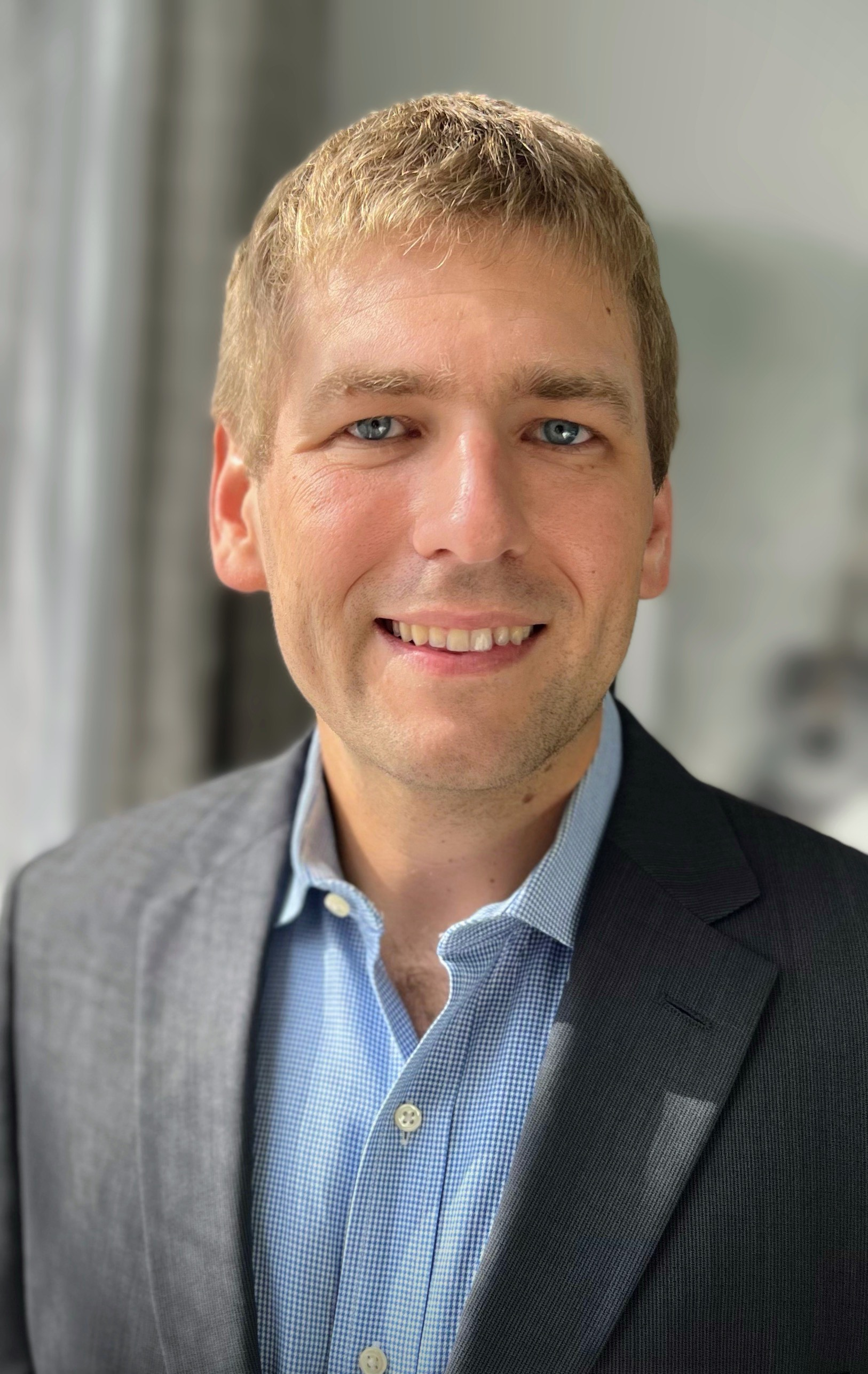
- Born: c. 1987; Cary, North Carolina, U.S.
- Education: Harvard College
- Occupation: Businessman
- Employers: Co-founder and CEO of Datavant; Co-founder and CEO of LiveRamp
- Website: travismay.medium.com

Travis May (born 1987) is an American entrepreneur. He is the CEO of Shaper Capital, founder and former CEO of Datavant and previously co-founded and was the CEO of LiveRamp.

== Early life ==
May was born in Cary, North Carolina, in 1987. He grew up in Cary and attended Cary Academy, graduating in 2005. While in high school, he was a member of a four-person team that won the mid-Atlantic regional and competed in the 2005 National Economics Challenge.

May attended Harvard College, graduating in 2009 with degrees in economics and mathematics, magna cum laude. During his freshman year, he co-founded the Harvard Entrepreneurial Forum. When he was a sophomore, he created the website IvyAdmits.com, which featured examples of successful college application essays from Ivy League students. Later, he co-founded the i3 The Harvard College Innovation Challenge, a student startup competition, which continues annually with support from the Technology and Entrepreneurship Center at Harvard.

== Career ==
When he was a student at Harvard in 2007, May co-founded Campus Venture Network Inc with Vivek G. Ramaswamy. May was the company's CEO. May and Ramaswamy created StudentBusinesses.com, a closed social network that paired students who had business ideas with potential investors. The website was tested at Harvard and the University of North Carolina at Chapel Hill and expanded to Duke University, the Massachusetts Institute of Technology, Stanford University, Yale University, and several hundred students in India. In 2009, the Ewing Marion Kauffman Foundation purchased Campus Venture Network and its StudentBusinesses.com for an undisclosed amount.

After graduating, May took the position of vice president of product at Rapleaf, a small start-up company co-founded by Auren Hoffman in San Francisco. In 2011, May co-founded LiveRamp with Hoffman and was its vice president of product. LiveRamp was a Silicon Valley–based start-up company that provided data onboarding. After three years, Acxiom purchased LiveRamp for $310 million. May became acting president of Acxiom and CEO of its LiveRamp division for eight years. Between 2015 and 2016, LiveRamp generated $90 million in revenue. By 2017, it was worth more than $1.5 billion. Its customers included Adobe, American Express, and Google. Acxiom assigned May to the new position of chief growth officer in September 2017. Although May was allowed to spend some work time on his new start-up, he resigned from Acxiom in April 2018.

In September 2017, May became the CEO of Datavant, a San Francisco–based biotech company he co-founded with his former business partner Ramaswamy. May made a “significant personal investment” in Datavant which was initially supported by Roivant Sciences, a healthcare company owned by Ramaswamy. In 2018, May helped lead a $40.5 million financing round, securing investments from Cigna Ventures and Johnson & Johnson Innovation. Datavant entered into a $7 billion merger with Ciox Health in 2021. After the merger, May stepped down as CEO, becoming the president of the company and remaining on its board of directors.

In 2024, May co-founded Fractional AI, which was acquired by Anthropic, Blackstone, and Hellman & Friedman in 2026.

== Honors ==
- In 2016, Forbes magazine named May to its 30 Under 30: Marketing & Advertising list
- Ad Age named May to its 40 Under 40 List in 2016.

== Personal life ==
May married Holly Metter, a graduate of Cary Academy and Harvard, on the Cary Academy campus in 2012. She is the CEO of the Exponential Scholars Foundation. In 2019, the couple donated $500,000 to Cary Academy, establishing the Metter May Scholarship which provides full tuition for financially disadvantaged students. In 2026, they announced a $2 million grant to fund every DonorsChoose project in North Carolina. May was a sponsor of the i3 The Harvard College Innovation Challenge in 2021.
