= Maia arson crimew =

Swiss hacker (born 1999)

maia arson crimew
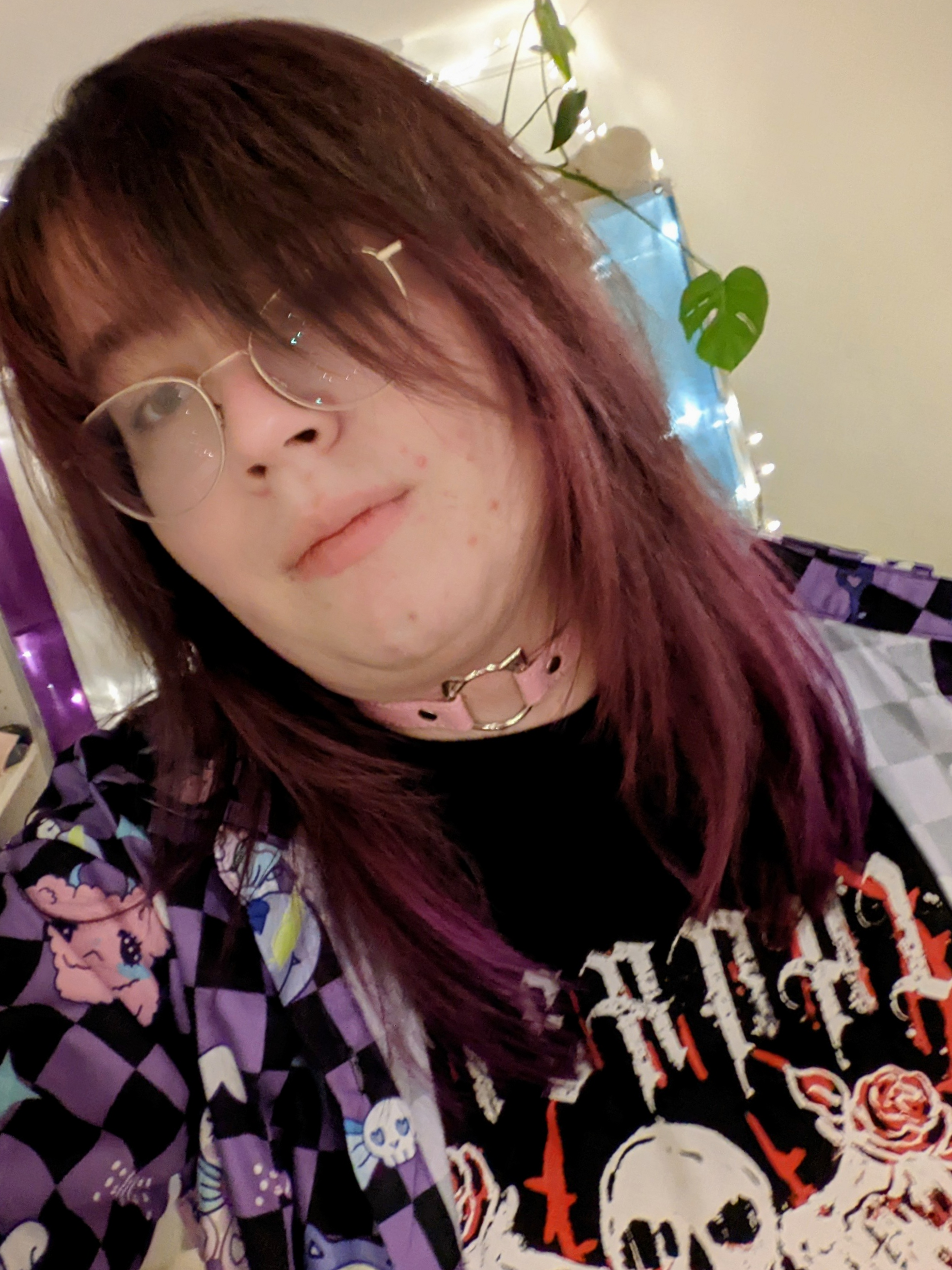
- crimew in December 2022
- Born: August 7, 1999 (age 27); Lucerne, Switzerland
- Other names: Tillie Kottmann; Deletescape; Tillie crimew
- Occupations: Software developer; computer hacker
- Known for: Hacktivism, Lawnchair Android launcher
- Movement: Anarchism
- Website: maia.crimew.gay

maia arson crimew (Note: "Crimew" (/ˈkraɪˌmjuː/) is a portmanteau of the words crime and mew, as in the onomatopoeia of a cat's cry. Her name is in all lowercase. Crimew describes her pronouns as "it(/she)". She strongly prefers it/its, especially in informal contexts, but is "totally fine" with she/her in more formal contexts, such as in the Wikipedia article about her. For clarity, accessibility, and consistency, this article uses she/her throughout.) (previously known as Tillie Kottmann; born August 7, 1999) is a Swiss developer, hacktivist, and anarchist. Crimew is known for leaking source code and other data from companies such as Intel and Nissan, and for discovering a 2019 copy of the United States government's No Fly List on an unsecured cloud server owned by CommuteAir. Crimew was also part of a group that hacked into Verkada in March 2021 and accessed more than 150,000 cameras. She is the founding developer of the Lawnchair application launcher for Android.

In March 2021, crimew was indicted by a grand jury in the United States on criminal charges related to her alleged hacking activity between 2019 and 2021. The charges were unrelated to the hack of Verkada. Swiss police raided her home and her parents' home at the request of US authorities, and her electronic devices were seized. After the raid, people used the hashtag "#freetillie" to express support for her, and the Swiss magazine Republik compared her to Jeremy Hammond and Aaron Swartz.

== Early life ==
crimew was born on August 7, 1999, in the Bruch district of Lucerne in the German-speaking region of Switzerland. As a teenager, she worked in information technology. She was the founding developer of the popular Android launcher "Lawnchair", which has been maintained by a different development team since 2021. A member of the Young Socialists Switzerland, crimew was a candidate for Lucerne City Council in 2020.

== Early leaks ==
In July 2020, crimew posted source code from dozens of companies to a GitLab repository. Bleeping Computer credited her with originating the Nintendo Gigaleak, but she later told Tom's Guide that Nintendo data was not included in the July leak and that she had never posted Nintendo code to GitLab because the company was "notorious for quick takedowns". On August 6, 2020, crimew uploaded more than 20 gigabytes of Intel's proprietary data and source code to Mega. She obtained the data from another hacker who claimed to have breached Intel around May 2020, and described it as a first installment that would be followed by more leaks related to Intel. In January 2021, crimew was involved in a source code leak from Nissan. She said she got the leaked code after learning from an anonymous source about a Bitbucket server that was set up with the default username and password.

In March 2021, crimew said that most of her breaches did not require much technical skill. In addition to leaking data herself, she maintained a Telegram channel, "ExConfidential", where she shared details of leaks by others. In March 2021, Distributed Denial of Secrets created a torrent of data from the channel after crimew's home was raided and her devices seized.

== Verkada hack ==
On March 8, 2021, a group of hackers including crimew calling itself "APT - 69420 Arson Cats" gained "super admin" rights in the network of Verkada, a cloud-based security camera company, using credentials it found on the public internet. The group had access to the network for 36 hours. It collected about 5 gigabytes of data, including live security camera footage and recordings from more than 150,000 cameras in places like a Tesla factory, a prison in Alabama, a Halifax Health hospital, and residential homes. The group also accessed a list of Verkada customers and the company's private financial information, and gained access to the corporate networks of Cloudflare and Okta through their Verkada cameras.

crimew acted as the group's spokesperson; during the hack, she tweeted, "What if we just absolutely ended surveillance capitalism in two days?" Her Twitter account was suspended for violating Twitter's terms of service after she used it to share screenshots of live security camera feeds. She contacted a Bloomberg journalist shortly after the breach, who in turn contacted Verkada, which removed the hackers' access to the network. She told Bloomberg that the hack exposed "just how broadly we're being surveilled, and how little care is put into at least securing the platforms used to do so, pursuing nothing but profit". An acquaintance of crimew told Zentralplus that they thought she would have carried out the hack for fun regardless of her political views.

== Indictment ==
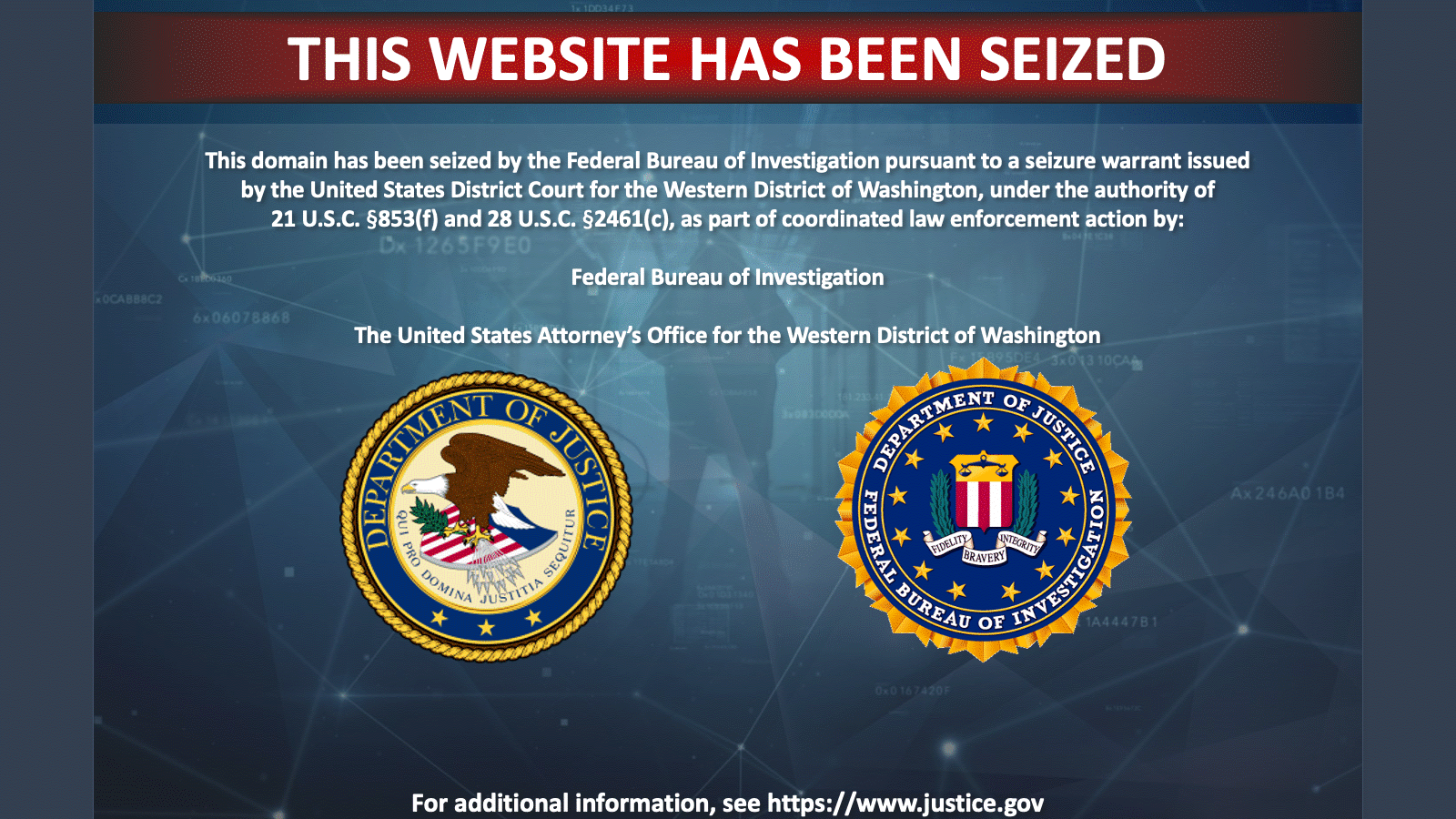
Banner showing seizure of the git.rip domain by the FBI

In March 2021, crimew was indicted by a grand jury in the United States District Court for the Western District of Washington on charges related to several hacks she allegedly carried out between 2019 and 2021. The indictment alleged that crimew hacked dozens of entities, published proprietary information and code from more than 100 entities including government agencies, and sold hacking-related merchandise such as t-shirts. It charged her with computer fraud and abuse, wire fraud, and identity theft. The indictment, and a raid by the Swiss police in which crimew's electronic devices were seized at the request of US authorities, came shortly after she claimed involvement in the Verkada hack, but did not contain charges related to it. Seven police officers searched her home during the raid, and fifteen searched her parents' home. The website git.rip, through which photos from the hacked Verkada cameras were originally shared, was seized by the FBI.

As of March 19, 2021, crimew was being represented by lawyer Marcel Bosonnet in Switzerland. A crowdfunding campaign was created in April 2021 to raise money for her to retain a lawyer in the US.

=== Public response ===
People used the hashtag "#freetillie" to express support for crimew after her home was raided. Hacking researcher Gabriella Coleman said she expected crimew to gain more support in "the hacker community" as a result of the indictment, saying that in some cases the US government has been overly aggressive in prosecuting "hacktivists", who pursue "a variety of leftist and anti-authoritarian ideals", and that "the hacker community has this in mind". Republik said crimew was "in the tradition of hackers like Jeremy Hammond or Aaron Swartz." Hernâni Marques, a board member of the Swiss chapter of Chaos Computer Club, called for "solidarity" with crimew. Seattle prosecutors rebuked the view that the leak had "any redeeming quality", with US Attorney Tessa M. Gorman saying "publishing source code and proprietary and sensitive information on the web is not protected speech—it is theft and fraud" and "wrapping oneself in an allegedly altruistic motive does not remove the criminal stench from such intrusion, theft, and fraud".

=== Possibility of extradition or trial in Switzerland ===
After the indictment, a United States Department of Justice spokesperson told Blick that proceedings had been suspended, explaining that the US would not continue with the case unless crimew was in the US and defended by a lawyer. crimew has said she is confident she will not be extradited to the US. Swiss lawyer Roman Kost said that Swiss extradition law does not allow extradition of citizens without their consent but that Swiss hackers "can be tried in Switzerland if there is sufficient suspicion and evidence, and if they are found guilty, they can be punished". Switzerland's Federal Department of Justice and Police confirmed to zentralplus that it does not extradite Swiss nationals against their will. Swiss newspaper Le Temps reported that crimew would not be extradited and would instead be tried in Switzerland.

20 Minuten reported that if crimew were tried in Switzerland, she would face a maximum of four and a half years in prison. Marques said, "much of what [she] did would not be punishable in Switzerland", adding that much of the data crimew leaked was publicly available on the internet and arguing that the hack of Verkada was "legitimate and useful for society" because of the privacy issue it exposed. In March 2021, Blick reported that a potential warrant for crimew's arrest issued by the US would likely be executed by all countries that border Switzerland. In September 2021, crimew told null41 that she was certain she would never be able to travel to certain countries again, and that even if she could in the future, it would be risky because of the possibility of extradition from other countries. She noted that, unlike Julian Assange, she was not relying on the goodwill of a country, because the Swiss constitution prohibits her extradition. In October 2021, Zeit Magazin reported that, while Interpol does not publicize most of its investigations, it was likely that an international arrest warrant had been issued for crimew, which would potentially render her unable to leave Switzerland.

== No Fly and Selectee Lists leak ==
On January 19, 2023, crimew reported that she had gained access to 2019 versions of the US government's No Fly List of 1.56 million entries and Selectee List of 250,000 entries hosted by CommuteAir on an unsecured Amazon Web Services cloud server. crimew said that, despite the size of the Terrorism Screening Database, there were "very clear trends towards almost exclusively Arabic and Russian sounding names throughout the million entries"; over 10% of the listed entries contained "Muhammad" in either the first or last name fields.

crimew announced her discovery in a blog post, which featured a photo of the list mostly obscured by a plush toy of the Pokémon Sprigatito and the caption "holy shit, we actually have the nofly [sic] list. holy fucking bingle. what?! :3". The character and associated phrase became an Internet meme associated with the hack.

== Dialog leak ==
The logo of Dialog

In June 2026, crimew leaked the full registration list to the Dublin retreat of Dialog, a secretive forum group founded by Auren Hoffman and Palantir co-founder Peter Thiel. The leak revealed the group has a membership ranking system, with members being ranked on an "A" "B" and "C" level, with C being the highest level, as well as a "value-add" score that ranges from 1 to 4. It also revealed various discussions held by the group, including a session titled "Democracy Under Surveillance", as well as a forum on cult-building held by a co-founder of Pray.com, as well the fact that actor Josh Brolin is a VIP member of the group.

== Publication of DHS leak ==
On October 28, 2026, crimew and DDoSecrets published a searchable database titled "Icepick" that identified the names, phone numbers, and email addresses of over 40,000 United States Department of Homeland Security (DHS) employees and agents, including 21,000 employed by Customs and Border Protection and 10,000 employed by ICE. Some of the identities leaked included undercover agents.

crimew stated that the information was obtained from a group named "Department of Peace". DHS stated that it was "aware of a potential breach and is actively working to address the situation swiftly and effectively." The social media website Bluesky told Wired magazine that it had blocked links to the leak from its website, labeling it "malicious". White House "border czar" Tom Homan stated that the Department of Justice would investigate the breach and urged critics of ICE to "know that ICE agents are mothers and fathers too."

Icelandic webhost FlokiNET released a statement regarding a request to take down crimew's database sent by the cybersecurity contractor ZeroFox, which claimed the publication was in violation of FlokiNET's policy against doxxing. FlokiNET denied the request and characterized Icepick as "[describing] people in the exercise of public authority, not in their private lives" that "the public has a legitimate interest in knowing". Icepick went offline briefly after CentralNic, the site's domain name registrar, took down the original domain, but the database was later republished on a new domain.

== Other activities ==
crimew worked with journalist Ryan Fae to investigate the true identity behind what was thought to be one of Elon Musk's alternative accounts on Twitter, determining that Adrian Dittmann was his real name and that he lived in Fiji. Jacqueline Sweet reported this in January 2025 in The Spectator. In response, Twitter suspended crimew's and the two journalists' accounts due to its policy against doxxing.

== Personal life and beliefs ==
crimew lives in Switzerland. She is non-binary and uses it/its and she/her pronouns, with a strong preference for it/its. She identifies as both bisexual and a lesbian. She is a member of the Young Socialists Switzerland, and has run for political office on socialist platforms. crimew is an activist for Boycott, Divestment and Sanctions, being involved in the "No Tech for Genocide" protest in Geneva. She was briefly detained after interrupting the ITU AI for Good event on July 8, 2025, climbing on stage holding a banner and chanting slogans including "Free Palestine" and "No tech for genocide". crimew has cited curiosity, anti-capitalism, anarchism, and opposition to the concept of intellectual property as motives for her hacking, saying, "caring about literally nothing but profit definitely doesn't result in security". She has said she believes source code and documentation should be public, and that she thinks of herself as a hacktivist. crimew has said that being queer and experiencing discrimination contributed to her political views.

crimew publishes a blog about exploits by herself and others. Since August 2024, she has also been a columnist for the German-language investigative journalism magazine Das Lamm.

crimew has also been known as Tillie Kottmann, "deletescape", and "tillie crimew". In 2022, she legally changed her name to maia arson crimew, which is stylized in all lowercase.
