= Team Performance Management =

- Discipline: Management
- Language: English
- Edited by: Petru Curseu

Publication details
- History: 1995-present
- Publisher: Emerald Group Publishing
- Frequency: Quarterly

Standard abbreviations
- ISO 4: Team Perform. Manag.

Indexing
- ISSN: 1352-7592
- OCLC no.: 613802180

Links
- Journal homepage; Online archive

Team Performance Management is a quarterly peer-reviewed academic journal published by Emerald Group Publishing covering research on work-group and team performance management. The journal was established in 1995 and the editor-in-chief is Petru Curseu (Tilburg University).

== Abstracting and indexing ==
The journal is abstracted and indexed in DIALOG, INSPEC, ProQuest databases, and Scopus.
