= Datavant =

American health IT company

- Type: Privately held company
- Industry: Health information technology
- Founded: 2014
- Headquarters: New York, NY
- Key people: Kyle Armbrester, CEO
- Subsidiaries: Ciox Health
- Website: datavant.com

Datavant is a health information technology company with its corporate executive offices in New York, NY, USA, which develops and maintains a digital ecosystem for the exchange of healthcare data. Datavant's clients include clinical research organizations, pharmaceutical companies, payers, analytics companies, hospitals, and providers, operating primarily in the US healthcare market.

Along with the Health Care Cost Institute, Snowflake, Elsevier, Parexel, and others, Datavant operates the COVID-19 Research Database, which "enables public health and policy researchers to use real-world data to understand and combat the COVID-19 pandemic".

== History ==
Datavant was co-founded by Travis May in 2014 with a focus on data management in support of clinical trials. Datavant's founding CEO was Travis May, a former co-founder of LiveRamp.

The company received a $40.5 million Series A investment in 2018 led by Roivant Sciences, followed by a $40 million Series B investment in 2020. In June 2021, Datavant entered into a $7 billion deal to merge with the healthcare information management company Ciox Health. Following the merger, May became president and joined the company's board, while Ciox's CEO Pete McCabe become the CEO of the joint entity that continued under the Datavant name. Also in June 2021, Datavant announced a partnership with Biodesix, a life sciences diagnostics solutions company.

Since May 2024, the CEO of Datavant is Kyle Armbrester.

In February 2026, Datavant announced a data collaboration with Thermo Fisher Scientific to expand interoperability and linkage between real-world data and clinical research.

=== Ciox Health ===
Ciox Health was formerly known as HealthPort Incorporated and changed its name to CIOX Health in March 2016. The company was founded in 1976 and is headquartered in Alpharetta, Georgia.

Ciox Health was created by the merger of HealthPort, IOD Inc., Care Communications Inc. and ECS. It served more than 18,000 provider sites, 140 health plans and 1 million unique requesters of patient information.

In April 2017 Ciox Health acquired ArroHealth, a provider of chart retrieval and risk adjustment services for health plans and health care provider groups. The Hauppauge, New York-based target offers a variety of services, including: analytics, medical record retrieval, data aggregation, and risk adjustment coding.

== Data breaches and legal ==
=== 2021 ===
In July 2021, CIOX Health discovered an unauthorized individual had gained access to the email of an employee in the customer service department. The email account was immediately secured, with the subsequent investigation confirming the email account had first been accessed by an unauthorized individual on June 24, 2021, and access remained possible until the security breach was detected on July 2, 2021. CIOX health started notifying affected healthcare provider clients about the breach on December 30, 2021.

The HIPAA security breach was reported to the HHS Office for Civil Rights by CIOX Health, as affecting 12,493 individuals.

=== 2022 ===
In 2022, Ciox Health agreed to pay $1.85 million to resolve class action lawsuit claims it charged unfair fees for electronic copies of consumers’ medical records.

=== 2024 ===
==== March ====
On March 25, 2024, NOSSCR filed a complaint against CIOX Health with the U.S. Department of Health and Human Services’ Office of Civil Rights, claiming that CIOX Health's practice was to require prepayment of fees, delaying the records and causing a considerable amount of wasted time on behalf of those requesting records.

==== May ====
In May 2024, according to information submitted to the Maine Attorney General, a Datavant user's mailbox was accessed and exposed over 11,000 thousand individuals.

== Mergers and acquisitions ==
Datavant has expanded its operations and market share through mergers, acquisitions, and partnerships involving healthcare data exchange, analytics, and life sciences research.

In June 2019, Datavant completed the acquisition of Health Data Link, a data linkage provider serving academic medical centers, research institutions, nonprofits, and government agencies.

In June 2021, Datavant completed a $7 billion merger with Ciox Health, a provider of health information management and clinical data exchange services. The merger combined Datavant's data connectivity platform with Ciox Health's medical record access and release-of-information operations.

In November 2021, Datavant completed the acquisition of Mirador Analytics, a provider of HIPAA expert determination services and technology focused on statistical disclosure risk and patient privacy protections.

In December 2022, Datavant completed the acquisition of Swellbox, a company that provides digital tools allowing patients to request and access their own medical records.

In October 2023, Datavant acquired Healthjump, a healthcare data integration company.

In September 2024, Datavant acquired the Connected Care Platform and its value-based care solutions of Apixio, a health technology company that provides artificial intelligence and analytics solutions for risk adjustment and quality measurement in value-based care.

In July 2025, Datavant completed the acquisition of Aetion, a real-world evidence analytics company serving pharmaceutical and biotechnology organizations.

In August 2025, Datavant completed the acquisition of Ontellus, a provider of medical record retrieval and claims intelligence services.

In October 2025, Datavant completed the acquisition of DigitalOwl, a company specializing in artificial-intelligence-based analysis of medical records.

== Strategic partnerships ==
Datavant has entered into a number of strategic and business partnerships with major technology and life sciences organizations to support healthcare data exchange, analytics, and research.

Datavant has partnered with Amazon Web Services to support cloud-first healthcare data discovery and assessment.

Datavant launched Datavant Connect as a native application on Snowflake Inc., enabling healthcare data integration and privacy protection in the data cloud.

Datavant has partnered with Databricks to support privacy-preserving data sharing and analytics for life sciences and healthcare organizations.

Datavant has partnered with Syneos Health to expand collaboration efforts to accelerate delivery of new therapies to patients.

In May 2025, Datavant expanded its collaboration with Boehringer Ingelheim related to real-world evidence initiatives.

In October 2025, Datavant announced a collaboration with athenahealth focused on automating and streamlining medical record requests within provider workflows.
