= Keighran =

Keighran is a surname. Notable people with the surname include:

- Adam Keighran (born 1997), Australian rugby league player
- Ben Keighran (born 1982), Australian businessman
- Daniel Keighran (born 1983), Australian Army soldier and Victoria Cross recipient
- Darren Keighran (born 1969), Australian rules footballer
- Wade Keighran (born 1984), Australian musician
