= Cathy Edwards =

Cathy Edwards may refer to:

- Cathy Edwards (politician)
- Cathy Edwards (software engineer)
