= Jennifer Summit =

American historian (born 1965)

Professor Jennifer Summit
- Occupations: Provost, San Francisco State University

Academic background
- Education: Vassar College (AB); Johns Hopkins University (PhD)

Academic work
- Discipline: English studies, History
- Sub-discipline: Medieval literature, Renaissance literature, Medieval women, Gender studies, History of books

Jennifer Summit (born 1965) is an American scholar of medieval and Renaissance English literature and was a professor of English at Stanford University, where she was chair of the English department between 2008 and 2011. In 2013, Summit became dean of undergraduate studies at San Francisco State University. Summit is currently the provost at San Francisco State University.

== Early life and education ==
Summit is the daughter of Roger K. Summit, founder of Dialog Information Services and Virginia M. Summit, author and former mayor of Los Altos Hills, California.

A graduate of Los Altos High School (Los Altos, California), Summit received her AB from Vassar College in 1987, where she graduated with highest honors and Phi Beta Kappa. She was awarded a PhD by Johns Hopkins University in 1995.

== Career ==
Summit joined the Stanford faculty in 1995 and was granted tenure in 2001. She became Dean of Undergraduate Education at San Francisco State University in 2014.

Summit's work has been supported by the National Endowment for the Humanities, the American Council of Learned Societies and the Stanford Humanities Center. She received the Dean's Award for Distinguished Teaching in 1998.

Her most recent book, Action versus Contemplation: Why an Ancient Debate Still Matters, co-authored with Blakey Vermeule, was published in 2018, and was shortlisted for the Phi Beta Kappa Ralph Waldo Emerson Award.Memory's Library: Medieval Books in Early Modern England (2008), was awarded the Roland H. Bainton Book Prize by the Sixteenth Century Society and Conference (SCSC) and the John Ben Snow Foundation Book Prize from the North American Conference on British Studies (NCBS). Her first book, Lost Property: the Woman Writer and English Literary History, 1380-1589, was published in 2000.

Summit's research interests bridge the medieval and early modern periods and focus on the histories of reading, literature, and knowledge, with a special interest in literacy and the disciplines today.

== Published works ==
- Lost Property: the Woman Writer and English Literary History, 1380–1589 (Chicago: Univ. of Chicago Press, 2000) ISBN 0-226-78013-9
- "Rethinking Periodization", a special issue of the Journal of Medieval and Early Modern Studies (Duke, 2007), co-edited with David Wallace (U. Penn) ASIN B0021WUW08
- Memory's Library: Medieval Books in Early Modern England (Chicago: Univ. of Chicago Press, 2008) ISBN 0-226-78171-2
- The History of British Women's Writing, 1500–1610: Vol 2 (Palgrave, 2010), co-edited with Caroline Bicks (Boston College) ISBN 0-230-21834-2
- Action versus Contemplation: Why an Ancient Debate Still Matters (Chicago: University of Chicago Press, 2018) ISBN 978-0-226-03223-8
