= Dialog (organization) =

Private invitation-only society

- Formation: 2006; 20 years ago
- Founders: Peter Thiel; Auren Hoffman
- Type: Private, invitation-only society
- Purpose: Off-the-record forum for executives, elected officials, and academics
- Region served: International
- Members: Invitation-only
- Executive director: Raffi Grinberg
- Website: dialog.org

Dialog is a private, invitation-only organization founded in 2006 that is sometimes compared to Bilderberg and the World Economic Forum. Forbes has described it as a "Bilderberg [...] meets Silicon Valley salon". The organization was founded by Peter Thiel and Auren Hoffman. It maintains a low public profile (without officially disclosed membership), and has been described as a closed-door meeting that brings together executives, elected officials, and academics. It also offers a matchmaking service that pairs single members with each other.

The organization has been criticized for elitism and for prompting conspiratorial speculation, given its invitation-only format and limited public information. Others have defended the Dialog gatherings as a space for thinkers to authentically express themselves without fear of reprisals.

== Membership and retreats ==
Membership and participation in Dialog retreats are by invitation only. With membership come invitations to private dinners at the homes of other members, concierge services, group chats, and global excursions. Retreats often include about 200 people and usually last several days. Since the beginning, there have been around 2,500 participants in annual events, among them over 1,000 paying members, according to internal documents.

According to leaked information, Dialog staff and their artificial intelligence tools create dossiers on every member and potential member, and assign them a grade reflecting their desirability to Dialog: a C is given to the most famous and influential, A is assigned to established members who are less notable, while most people receive a B. The dossiers also include notes about assets under management, a score from 1–4 for how much value the person added to Dialog discussions, who can be trusted to moderate discussions, and notes about how well they fit in during previous events. They also track every person's political leanings, occasionally changing them from what people say about themselves.

The amount a person pays to attend a Dialog retreat depends on the grades in their dossier: lower-graded people usually pay full price (which can be more than $10,000) and higher-graded people are given discounts. Events have been held at the Bacara Resort in California, Ritz-Carlton Dove Mountain in Arizona, and the San Clemente Palace in Venice, Italy. These gatherings are off the record and emphasize candid discussion across political viewpoints.

According to Axios, participants discuss topics ranging from AI, health care, and politics to personal themes such as caregiving, relationships, mental health, and the afterlife. There are no speakers or panel discussions, but exclusively moderated discussion rounds in small groups of eight to twelve participants.

About 10% of respondents opt to be placed in a pool of singles. Dialog staff, with assistance from algorithmic tools, pair members with each other. Leaked information shows that Dialog also keeps a list of people who should not be paired because they are spouses or professional associates. Members are not paired with Dialog's organizers or staff.

== Participants ==
Reported Dialog event participants include Reema Al-Saud, Scott Bessent, Cory Booker, Sophia Bush, Ted Cruz, Tulsi Gabbard, Jonathan Haidt, Steven Pinker, Bret Stephens, Auren Hoffman, Reid Hoffman, Robert Hur, Garry Kasparov, Elon Musk, Eric Schmidt, Anne-Marie Slaughter, Larry Summers, Peter Thiel, Rick Warren, and many others.

Analyst Gerardo Spagnuolo of the NATO Defense College Foundation (a NATO-recognized think tank associated with NDC) wrote that the participants include "bi-partisan, albeit heavily libertarian-leaning" members of Congress, intelligence and defense officials, European leaders who are concerned with digital sovereignty, and thinkers such as psychologists and logicians. According to Spagnuolo, the core of the gathering is "the architects of the new defence and Artificial Intelligence industries", who are named as Palmer Luckey, Alex Karp, Elon Musk, Sandro Salsano, and representatives of Andreessen Horowitz and Founders Fund, who back dual use technologies. Wired wrote that what ties the participants together is not titles or occupations, but "a shared preoccupation with artificial intelligence, longevity, and the near future" and that participants are coached to avoid "status signalling". Participants are distinguished as "active member" and "guest".

A Dialog delegation sent to Pakistan to meet with the country's officials in November 2025 included Ali Jehangir Siddiqui (the delegation's leader), Simon Stevens, Veit Dengler, Yasmin Green, Fatima Kardar (vice president at Xbox), Shadi Martini (CEO of MultiFaith Alliance), Evan Marwell, and Himanshu Gulati.

== Planned campus ==
In 2025, Dialog was looking to purchase land near the Washington, D.C. area for a planned campus. As of 2026, no further information about the purchase was reported.

Spagnuolo observes that the gathering has a focus on military matters and artificial intelligence, which can possibly emphasize efficiency over democratic oversight. The analyst also connects the planned 2026 establishment of the Virginia campus (in the vicinity of Langley and The Pentagon) with Dialog's transition from its nomadic phase to an institutional phase, noting the role of the Thiel Foundation.

== 2026 leak ==
In June 2026, two pieces of information were exposed: a directory on the Dialog website, and registration records for Dialog's planned 2026 retreat in Dublin.

The code for the Dialog website had an unprotected list of 113 people labeled "Directory List", and this was initially reported as a membership directory. Later reporting said the list included non-members, event speakers, and guests from years past. Hacktivist maia arson crimew, following an anonymous tip, revealed that the website was misconfigured and publicly displaying private member information. Wired reported that accessing the data required only filling out a form and clicking on a link. Malwarebytes called the exploit a "signup page that led straight to members' files". According to Wired, the data was already available client-side in the web browser of anyone visiting the site.

Separately, other records and documents were leaked to reporters. These records show 222 people signed up to attend the 2026 retreat. Of that group, 87 are first-time attendees, while others have been attending since the organization's beginning 20 years ago. The people who registered for the event may be full members, guests of members, or conference participants. This leak also included member and potential-member dossiers, and packets that listed topics for discussion in 2026, such as:

- "Money (Does?) Buy Happiness"
- "Bring Back Nuclear"
- "Navigating WW III"
- "Battlefield Technologies"
- "How's Your Sex Life?"
- "Build-a-Cult (Soapbox)" (moderated by a founder of Pray.com)
- "Build-a-Party" (moderated by a former White House national security official)
- "It's Fun to Be in Charge"

The aftermath of the leak disclosure prompted public responses from several Hollywood figures on the attendee list, including Joseph Gordon‑Levitt, Sophia Bush, and Josh Brolin. They noted the political controversy surrounding the members of the group and emphasized that they did not know Thiel, had never met him, or had only attended Dialog events out of personal business interest.

The Powerscourt Estate, which was reserved for the 2026 retreat, issued a statement that it wanted to cancel the event but could not do so per ownership by MHL Hotel Group. Local elected officials began investigating whether they could bar the retreat from Ireland.

According to Danish TV 2 News, it is common for participants to report that they attended but did not meet Thiel. Some defend Dialog and their participation in the events. Danish minister of health and ecclesiastical affairs Ida Auken, who has confirmed her participation in the 2026 event, wrote that she disagrees with what Thiel stands for but considers Dialog "a large conference that includes participants from across the political spectrum, business and organizations from all over the world with the express purpose of meeting people with very different backgrounds." General Stanley A. McChrystal, who attended two events "about a decade ago", said: "My experience was all positive—a gathering of thoughtful people across the political spectrum... and in my memory the gathering discussed almost every kind of subject but politics. Non-attribution was applied simply to encourage candor."

Wired wrote that attendees "registered with personal or corporate accounts, placing their attendance outside the email systems subject to public-records laws." German documents show that in 2018, the politician Jens Spahn, then federal minister of health, traveled to Dialog in an official capacity. As he also met the Irish prime minister and minister for health during the same trip, he was asked by Green Party politician Irene Mihalic which appointment, the Dialog event or the meeting with Irish politicians, was the trip's focus. Spahn said, "It's important to me to exchange ideas with people who have different opinions than I do [...] I won't let anyone take away this openness." Spahn, who has attended the event five times, said he is unfamiliar with the term "Dialog Society" and has not met Thiel in the format of the event, as Thiel has not participated for many years.

Some publications reported that the sex trafficker Jeffrey Epstein was invited to the 2014 meeting. Wired and The Guardian later retracted that claim because the invitation letter from Auren Hoffman was sent to the scientist Lisa Randall, and the person named "Jeff Epstein" in the attached list of attendees was a different person (a former Oracle executive).

=== Official response ===
Dialog said the "attack" was "executed by a well-known criminal who is wanted in the United States". At the same time, Wired said it found no evidence that a break-in was needed to gain access, since all that was required to obtain the data was filling out a web form.

== See also ==
- Bilderberg meeting
- Bohemian Grove
- Executive Branch (club)
- World Economic Forum
