= Personyze =

Software development company

- Company type: Private
- Industry: Web analytics
- Founded: Nov 2008
- Headquarters: Tel Aviv, Israel
- Key people: Yakov Shabat; Danny Hen
- Number of employees: 18
- Website: www.personyze.com

Personyze is a Web 2.0 start-up company based in Tel Aviv, Israel, that provides software as a service (SaaS) for website personalization.

== History ==
Personyze was founded in November 2008 in Tel Aviv, Israel, by Yakov Shabat and Danny Hen. Within two years, it became a leading personalization website provider, with Facebook integration and behavioral targeting.

Personyze also provides analytics and A/B testing. In June 2011 Rapleaf announced a partnership with Personyze to allow the use of the demographics database and in July 2011 they introduced plugins to two content management systems: WordPress and Joomla.

== Criticism ==
Personyze was criticized by Forbes for contributing to the filter bubble, which is a technology that sorts everything out on the basis of the user's activities that may consequently present visitors with only a portion of the content/offers, while excluding other content/offers from ever being presented to them.
