= Roger K. Summit =

American businessman (1930–2026)

- Born: October 14, 1930; Detroit, Michigan, U.S.
- Died: June 7, 2026 (aged 95); Los Altos Hills, California, U.S.
- Education: Stanford University

Roger Kent Summit (October 14, 1930 – June 7, 2026) was American businessman who founded Dialog Information Services, and has been called the father of modern online search. He worked for Lockheed in the 1960s, was put in charge of its information retrieval lab, and from his work created a system that became known as Dialog and spun off by Lockheed in the 1970s. Dialog is one of the leading professional online services, used by companies, law firms, governments etc. as a key online research tool.

== Early life ==
Roger Kent Summit was born on October 14, 1930 in Detroit, Michigan. He grew up in Dearborn, Michigan, where both his parents were teachers. His father was also a guidance counselor and played piano and organ for silent films. Summit himself was musically gifted. He played trombone in high school and made money in college using his talent to play in dance bands. He also learned to play the horn. Summit vacationed in the West Coast in the summer of 1941 when he was 11 years old. It was the first time he had seen the mountains and the ocean, and the experience never left him. Later in life he decided to attend college at Stanford because of this early experience. He continued to reside there.

== Middle years ==
Summit held a doctorate in management science, a master's in business administration, and a bachelor's in psychology, all from Stanford University. When he was a doctoral candidate at Stanford University in 1960, he took a summer job at Lockheed Missiles and Space Co. to improve information retrieval methods, and in 1962 was appointed designer and project manager at Lockheed. When the Lockheed Corporation formed the Information Sciences Laboratory (1964) their mission for the lab was to examine how third-generation hardware would affect computing in the information sciences. Third-generation hardware, typified by the IBM 360 computer, introduced mass random-access storage, remotely controlled processing via telecommunications, and a time-sharing operation that allowed many people to utilize the computer at the same time. Roger Summit and a colleague submitted a proposal to the Lockheed Corporation to further explore and develop this technology. He was then given responsibility for information retrieval. Organizations were already conducting searches by inputting queries on punched cards. However, searches couldn't be revised after they were entered and during the process, therefore the outcomes of the search were at times unpredictable. The equipment that they were using was considered second-generation equipment. Summit's goal was to design an interactive retrieval language with third generation equipment that would bypass some of the problems they had with the second-generation equipment.

In 1968 Summit and his colleagues at Lockheed won a major contract from NASA to develop an online retrieval system for its database of aerospace research documents. Later, they won contracts to apply this technology to the databases of the Atomic Energy Commission, the European Space and Research Organization, the U.S. Office of Education, and the National Technical Information Service. In early 1972 Summit and his team offered the Educational Resources Information Center (ERIC) and the National Technical Information Service databases to any subscriber with a computer terminal. This is when Dialog was established as a commercial information retrieval business within Lockheed Palo Alto Research Laboratory, and became the world's first commercial online service.

In 1982, Dialog spun off as a wholly owned subsidiary with Roger Summit as president. In 1988, he participated in the sale of Dialog to Knight- Ridder Inc., and in February 1990 he was named president of its electronic publishing group. One year later, he assumed the office of chairman and chief executive officer until his retirement in late 1991.

== Family ==
Summit married Virginia Buckthorn in 1964. They had two children. Their eldest child, Jennifer Summit, is the interim provost and vice president of academic affairs at San Francisco State University. Their son, Scott Summit, is CTO of the medical device company Bespoke Innovations.

== Dialog ==
=== Development ===
In 1960, while employed at Lockheed Missiles and Space, Summit learned that it was often easier, cheaper, and faster to redo research on a topic rather than trying to figure out whether specific information already existed (Summit, 2002). He saw the potential in information retrieval systems, ultimately changing the future of research. With the new IBM technology, and Lockheed's general practice of ‘redoing research’ rather than wasting time, Summit had convinced Lockheed to support him in furthering research of information retrieval. One important criteria was that computer programmers would not be needed to conduct searches. The system would be interactive to allow searches and queries to be modified easily (also known as recursion), and that it would provide alphabetical displays of all the items one could choose from (also known as indexing.

The team Summit was now working with consisted of six people (himself included)

- Dexter Shultz — file loading software and operations
- Jim Brick — telecommunications (with consultation from Len Fick)
- Ken Lew — master applications programmer
- Bob Mitchell — systems programmer
- Ed Estes — system architect

Some of the problems Summit hoped to overcome were

- The user should be able to understand why results were retrieved based on the search statement provided. Summit hoped that this would allow the user to modify the search expression to improve the results for future searches.
- Recursion: the results of one search could be used in subsequent queries.
- Index terms should display alphabetically near a candidate term, together with posting frequencies to assist the user in formulating a search expression.
- Provision for nested Boolean expressions.

Summit and his team were striving to create a system that was adaptable. The system would allow users to gain the desired search outcome they sought in an easy and efficient manner. In 1965, they had developed a working prototype of Dialog and sought to have the prototype tested in a real situation using NASA's STAR database. When Summit's proposal was rejected over the Bunker Ramo System, he did not give up and instead created a smaller scale proposal, with minimized economic investment, for an experiment with Dialog to run parallel to Bunker Ramo. The minimalist proposal at the Ames Research Center proved to be more successful than the Bunker Ramo System leading to Dialog earning a contract with NASA in 1966. Information searches within the NASA STAR database went from taking 14 hours, plus shipping and handling, to a few minutes with Summit's Dialog system. Dialog was proving to be so much faster and efficient than anything seen before and in 1967, they received an award to develop the NASA RECON system. Dialog was associated with creating the first national network of terminals involving a large-scale database of 400,000 aerospace citations.

The success of NASA RECON led to many other contracts. Under Dr. Summit's direction, various versions of Dialog called RECON were installed in the 1960s for such government agencies as the U.S Atomic Energy Commission and the European Space Agency. Then, in 1969, the US Office of Education negotiated a contract to put their database on the Dialog system. In this contract, teachers and researchers would only be given access to search functions. The ERIC database (only offering educational materials) was the first, extensive, nationwide application that was a non-defense related online information retrieval service. This service was carried out through several centers around the country, and ultimately changed Dialog's business from installation of a system- to providing services of a system (Summit, 2002).

By 1972, Summit once again made a proposition and had convinced Lockheed that with the competition in the field, and the success of their work, they needed to go commercial. It was then that Dialog was established as a commercial information retrieval business. It became an independent company and was a success from that point on. In 1981, Dialog Information Services became a subsidiary of Lockheed Corporation and in 1988 they were purchased for $353 million by Knight-Ridder, Inc. By 1995, Dialog Information Services became Knight-Ridder Information Inc. In 1997, they were purchased by M.A.I.D PLC for $420 million and became The Dialog Corporation.

=== Current challenges ===
1) In 2008, Proquest announced the need to update Dialog's platform. This new platform would integrate Dialog and DataStar offerings. Legacy systems such as Dialog's need complete reworking to meet the challenges of the future—or even the present. ProQuest embarked on a major platform design project to integrate ProQuest and CSA content into a "best of breed", Web 2.0-level service. Unified access remained incomplete until 2010, necessitating continued decision-making on the part of researchers.

2) One of the barriers to transforming Dialog has always been restrictive clauses in Dialog's contracts with database producers, some of which date back 30 years or more. Contract problems affect both pricing rigidity and how the service can handle data. There was a need for extensive discussions with groups of information professionals about what they want and need from a newly designed system. By working on the integration process, content gaps were plugged by developing new databases.

=== Today ===
As of January 2011, ProQuest had been busy as it had its hands full with integrating multiple legacy platforms. It took the company until August 2010 to launch a first release of the new ProQuest Dialog, which offers a subset of Dialog and DataStar content intended for use by end users in the pharmaceutical/biomedical customer community where it planned a phased release for other content and markets. At that same time, ProQuest also started to preview its new ProQuest platform with content from ProQuest and CSA plus some from Chadwyck Healy. Not until November 2010 did the first library go live on the new platform. Then, in December 2010, ProQuest acquired the Congressional Information Service and University Publications of America product lines from LexisNexis .

The new ProQuest platform had only recently begun to be introduced and was expected to take years to complete, making it an ambitious undertaking. The company also announced is a partnership with libraries for a multi-year European book digitization project representing a multimillion-dollar investment. Together with the acquisition of ebrary, these initiatives are all in fulfillment of the company's mission "to connect people and information".

== Later years ==
In 1998, Summit was appointed to the board of directors at Dialog.

Even with his substantial amount of participation with Dialog, Summit was involved with many other professional ventures as well. He contracted with companies such as Thomson Corporation and ProQuest Company.

Summit was a frequent lecturer on the field of information sciences, was widely published, and was part of many national committees dealing with information policy, such as the Association of Independent Information Professionals. Stanford University Library Advisory Council, Sanford Jazz Workshop Board of Directors.

He died on June 7, 2026, at the age of 95, after being struck by a vehicle near his home in Los Altos Hills, California.

== Awards and recognition ==
From the Professional Biography of Dr. Summit, below is a partial list of the numerous awards and recognitions he received (in chronological order)

- Special Invention Award for the Aerospace Business Environment Simulator Computer Program, Lockheed Missiles and Space Company (1968)
- Information Product of the Year Award, Information Industry Association (1975)
- Hall of Fame Award, Information Industry Association (1982)
- LITA/Gaylord Award for Achievement in Library and Information Technology, American Library Association (1984)
- Elected Fellow of the American Association of Science (AAAS) (1986)
- Distinguished Service Award, Information Industry Association (1991)
- Award of Merit, American Society for Information Science (1991)
- Miles Conrad Memorial Lecture and Award, National Federation of Abstracting and Information Services (1996)
- IEEE Dialog Milestone Award (2019)
