= Chomp (search engine) =

App search engine

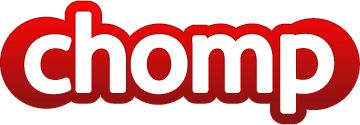
- Founded: 2009
- Defunct: 2012
- Fate: Acquired by Apple Inc.
- Website: chomp.com at the Wayback Machine (archived 2011-02-03)

Chomp was an app search engine company founded by Cathy Edwards and Ben Keighran in 2009. The company was based in San Francisco and had received $2.5 million in funding. Users could search for apps across multiple platforms, including iOS and Android; and there were Chomp apps for both platforms.

In February 2012, Apple, Inc. acquired Chomp for an undisclosed sum, although industry insiders cited $50 million. Within a few months, Chomp stopped all Android app searching, and removed its Android app from the Google Play Store; Chomp's iOS-based app, though—and its website's ability to search for Apple iPhone and iPad apps—continued, unabated. However, five months later, in September 2012, Chomp was finally completely discontinued, and its website became non-responsive.

== History ==
In January 2009 the company launched and released its first iPhone app. Chomp acquired over 300,000 users in the first eight weeks after its launch. By March 2010 it received a series A round of funding, of $2 Million. Investors included BlueRun Ventures, Ron Conway, Brian Pokorny, and David Lee. At this time, Chomp made further improvements to its search engine by enhancing its search functionality.

By February 2011 Chomp brought its search to the Android platform and released its Android app. This provided an improved experience from the existing search capabilities found in the Android market. By May 2011, the number of apps available had increased to 500,000 on the iOS market and 200,000 on the Android market. Chomp released a complete redesign of their iPhone app in September 2011. The new iPhone app included a new interface along with a faster and cleaner design. In September 2011, Chomp also announced the release of their new product “Chomp Search Ads”. Chomp Search Ads allowed app developers to bid on key words or phrases that will deliver their ads to users who search for those terms within the app search engine. The ads shown to Chomp users were based on relevancy and bid price. Chomp announced a partnership with Verizon in September 2011.

=== Acquisition by Apple ===
In February 2012, Apple Inc acquired Chomp Inc for an undisclosed amount. Notable sources posted the acquisition at $50 million, citing someone familiar with the matter. Within a few months, Chomp stopped all Android app searching, and removed its Android app from the Google Play Store; Chomp's iOS-based app continued unabated. However, five months later, in September 2012, Chomp was finally completely discontinued, and its website became non-responsive. It is thought that the features of chomps search program may have been integrated into apple's App Store.
