= List broker =

Person who helps people and companies conduct direct marketing campaigns

A list broker acts as an agent for those who wish to conduct direct marketing campaigns via direct mail, email, or telemarketing.

List brokers provide lists that, minimally, contain a prospect's name and physical address. Consumer Lists may include additional demographic information such as age, gender, income, etc.; Business Lists may include firmographic information like job title, industry, employee size, etc. List Brokers work on behalf of their clients to find the best lists that reach their clients' desired target audience in which to promote/advertise their product or service, and coordinates the procurement process.

Many promotional mailings such as catalogs, coupons, promotional offers and credit offers utilize lists purchased through list brokers.

Common associations to which list brokers belong are the American Marketing Association and the Direct Marketing Association.

== See also ==
- Direct marketing
- Distribution list
- Electronic mailing list
- Information broker
