= PeekYou =

People search engine

PeekYou, LLC.
- The Smartest Way to Find People Online
- Company type: Private
- Website type: Search engine
- Available in: English
- Founded: April 2006
- Headquarters: New York City, United States
- Key people: Michael Hussey, Founder; Thomas Lynch, President; Peter Bordes, Director
- Website: www.peekyou.com
- Registration: optional
- Launched: July 2006
- Current status: Offline

PeekYou is a people search engine that indexes people and their links on the web. Founded in April 2006 by Michael Hussey, PeekYou claims that they have indexed over 250 million people, mostly in the United States and Canada. The search results consist of publicly available URLs, including Facebook, LinkedIn, Wikipedia, Google+, blogs, homepages, business pages and news sources.

== See also ==
- Information broker
