= Roivant Sciences =

American pharmaceuticals company

Roivant Sciences Ltd.
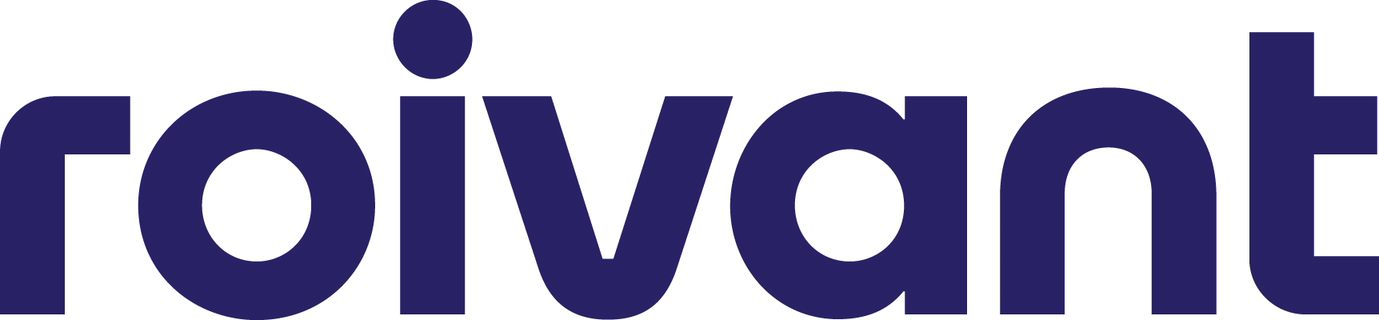
- Type: Public
- Traded as: Nasdaq: ROIV; S&P 400 component
- Industry: Pharmaceuticals
- Founded: April 7, 2014; 12 years ago
- Founder: Vivek Ramaswamy
- Headquarters: New York, NY 10036; U.S.
- Key people: Matt Gline (CEO)
- Revenue: ▲US$125 million (2024)
- Operating income: ▲US$4.24 billion (2024) (Note: Gain on sale of Telavant contributed $5.35bn.)
- Net income: ▲US$4.35 billion (2024)
- Total assets: ▲US$7.22 billion (2024)
- Total equity: ▲US$6.45 billion (2024)
- Owner: Vivek Ramaswamy (10.5%)
- Number of employees: 908 (2024)
- Website: roivant.com
- Footnotes; Financials as of 31 March 2024.

Roivant Sciences Ltd. is an American multinational healthcare company focused on applying technology to drug development and building subsidiary life sciences and health technology companies. It was founded in 2014 by Vivek Ramaswamy and is currently headed by CEO Matt Gline. Roivant maintains its headquarters in New York City as well as major offices in the biotech hubs of Boston and Basel.

== History ==
Vivek Ramaswamy founded Roivant in 2014. Ramaswamy's initial strategy was to in-license drug candidates and create subsidiaries focused on distinct therapeutic areas. This strategy expanded to include developing earlier stage drug candidates and platform technologies. Roivant is a parent company to over a dozen subsidiaries ranging from Immunovant, a majority-owned public company focused on autoimmune diseases, to privately held Dermavant Sciences, a commercial-stage company focused on medical dermatology.

Roivant also develops healthcare technologies through its business unit Roivant Health. Roivant built and launched Datavant, which allows healthcare institutions to share data, and was merged with Ciox to become a US$7 billion company. Roivant's technology portfolio also includes Lokavant, which integrates clinical trial data to identify and mitigate risks in pharmaceutical development. In 2017, Roivant partnered with the private equity arm of Chinese state-owned CITIC Group to form Sinovant. As of 2019, Roivant had over 40 investigational drugs in development in 14 therapeutic areas across its family of companies.

At the end of 2019, Roivant formed a $3 billion partnership with Sumitomo Dainippon Pharma and transferred its ownership stake in five of its subsidiaries: Myovant Sciences, Urovant Sciences, Enzyvant Therapeutics, Altavant Sciences, and Spirovant Sciences, which now sit under Sumitovant Biopharma. The deal included the option for Sumitomo to acquire up to six additional subsidiaries.

In April 2020, Roivant dosed the first patient in a clinical study evaluating gimsilumab in COVID-19 patients for the prevention and treatment of acute respiratory distress syndrome (ARDS). Additionally, in April, Datavant announced that its technology is being used to create a pro bono COVID-19 research database to help public health and policy researchers combat the pandemic.

In January 2021, Ramaswamy stepped down as CEO. Matt Gline, previously the company's chief financial officer, became CEO. In February 2021, Roivant acquired Silicon Therapeutics, a small-molecule drug designer and computational physics platform, for $450 million in Roivant equity. In October 2021, Roivant merged with special-purpose acquisition company Montes Archimedes Acquisition Corp. to become listed on the Nasdaq.

In June 2022, Roivant and Pfizer unveiled Priovant Therapeutics. Priovant was established in September 2021 through a transaction between Roivant and Pfizer, in which Pfizer licensed oral and topical brepocitinib's global development rights and US and Japan commercial rights to Priovant. Pfizer holds a 25% equity ownership interest in Priovant. Brepocitinib is a potential first-in-class dual, selective inhibitor of TYK2 and JAK1; in all five placebo-controlled studies completed to date, oral brepocitinib generated statistically significant and clinically meaningful results. Later that year in December 2022, Roivant and Pfizer announced their third partnership to create a new Vant focused on developing TL1A drug candidates for inflammatory and fibrotic diseases. As of February 2023, Roivant's reported market cap was over $6 billion.

Roivant's Sio Gene Therapies, has been accused of being a pump-and-dump scheme when it was named Axovant. This subsidiary purchased a medicament that was purported to alleviate Alzheimer's disease but had repeatedly failed clinical trials. When the company announced the potential release of such a product, the stock price rose; when the medication did not pass the third stage of pharmaceutical testing, the stock price declined. The shareholders voted to dissolve Sio Gene Therapies on April 2023.

In December 2023, Roche completed the acquisition of Telavant from Roivant for a purchase price of $7.1 billion upfront and a near-term milestone payment of $150 million.

In March 2026, Roivant subsidiary Genevant Sciences and Arbutus Biopharma reached a settlement with Moderna resolving worldwide patent litigation concerning lipid nanoparticle (LNP) technology used in Moderna's COVID-19 vaccine, Spikevax. The litigation alleged that Moderna had used LNP delivery technology owned by Genevant and Arbutus without authorization. Under the settlement, Moderna agreed to pay Genevant and Arbutus $950 million upfront, with an additional payment of up to $1.3 billion contingent on the outcome of an appeal concerning Moderna's liability for vaccine doses supplied under a U.S. government contract.

The settlement resolved all U.S. and international patent litigation between Moderna and Genevant and Arbutus and granted Moderna a license covering the LNP technology for certain infectious-disease vaccines. The agreement also eliminated future royalty obligations for Moderna under the settlement.

== Subsidiaries and former subsidiaries ==
As of April 2020, the company's subsidiaries include:

- Affivant
- Covant
- Datavant
- Genevant, created to work on RNA-based therapeutics
- Hemovant
- Immunovant, launched in July 2018 to develop therapies for autoimmune diseases, with lead candidate IMVT-1401 being developed for the treatment of myasthenia gravis, Graves' ophthalmopathy and warm antibody autoimmune hemolytic anemia
- Kinevant, a clinical-stage biopharmaceutical company developing new medicines for rare autoimmune and inflammatory diseases
- Lokavant, which is focused on improving clinical trial monitoring
- Priovant
- Psivant

Another company that was previously a subsidiary of Roivant is Axovant, whose name in its final years was Sio Gene Therapies.

The following subsidiaries were previously a part of Roivant, but were included as part of a strategic transaction with Sumitomo Dainippon Pharma which closed in December 2019:

- Altavant Sciences, which is developing a treatment for pulmonary arterial hypertension
- Dermavant, focused on developing therapeutics in medical dermatology, with lead candidate tapinarof in development for the treatment of psoriasis and atopic dermatitis Organon & Co. agreed to acquire Dermavant in a deal worth up to $1.2 billion, including a $175 million upfront payment.
- Enzyvant Therapeutics, which is focused on developing therapies for rare enzyme deficiencies
- Myovant Sciences, founded in partnership with Takeda Pharmaceutical Company to develop medicines for women's health and prostate cancer
- Spirovant, which focused on developing gene therapies for cystic fibrosis.
- Urovant, which is developing lead candidate vibegron, licensed from Merck & Co.

Roivant is a major shareholder of Datavant, which was co-founded with Travis May to link disparate healthcare datasets. In October 2020, Datavant announced it raised funds from Roivant alongside Transformation Capital, Johnson & Johnson, and Cigna.

In June 2018, Roivant laid off 67 employees and reassigned 130 to subsidiaries.

In March 2020, Roivant announced it is developing gimsilumab, an anti-granulocyte-macrophage colony-stimulating factor (anti-GM-CSF) monoclonal antibody to prevent and treat acute respiratory distress syndrome (ARDS) in patients with COVID-19. In April 2020, Roivant started the administration of gimsilumab to COVID-19 patients in the United States.

== Funding ==
The company received millions of dollars from hedge funds such as QVT in the early days of its existence. Later, it was able to raise US$200 million, with help from NovaQuest Capital Management.

PE/Growth round funding
Year	Amount
2019	$1 billion
2018	$200 million
2017	$1.1 billion
2015	$500 million
2014	$93 million
