= Caffeine (service) =

Live streaming video platform

- Website type: Live streaming, streaming video
- Dissolved: June 26, 2024; 2 years ago
- Area served: Worldwide
- Founders: Ben Keighran; Sam Roberts
- Website: caffine.tv at the Wayback Machine (archived 2020-06-05)
- Commercial: Yes
- Registration: Optional
- Launched: January 31, 2018; 8 years ago (Pre-Release)
- Current status: Defunct

Caffeine was a live streaming platform for gaming, sports, and other entertainment content.

Caffeine secured a $100 million investment in September 2018 from 21st Century Fox with chairman Lachlan Murdoch joining Caffeine's board, as well as the creation of a newly formed joint venture called Caffeine Studios. As of 2019, Caffeine had raised $146 million from investors in three rounds led by 21st Century Fox, Andreessen Horowitz, and Greylock Partners.

Both Caffeine and Twitch hosted pre-game events for Super Bowl 2020. Notable content creators who have used the platform include JuJu Smith-Schuster and Offset. In 2020 the rapper Drake signed an exclusive multi-year partnership with Caffeine to co-produce rap battles with the Ultimate Rap League.

Caffeine ended its service on June 26, 2024, stating that it was not able to achieve profitability.
