= Association of Independent Information Professionals =

International professional organization

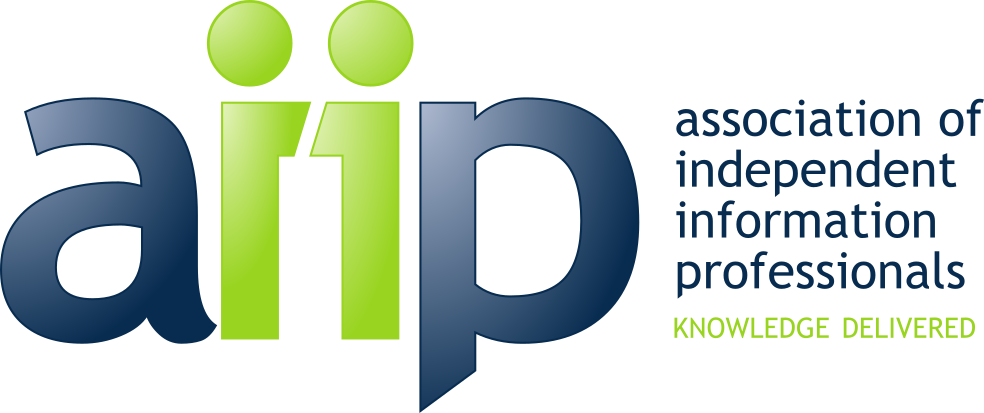
- Abbreviation: AIIP
- Formation: 1987; 39 years ago
- Type: Non-profit
- Headquarters: Baton Rouge, Louisiana
- Website: www.aiip.org

The Association of Independent Information Professionals (AIIP) is an international professional association for information professionals specializing in primary and secondary research, marketing and communications, information management and technology, training and consulting, and writing and editing.

== History ==
The Association of Independent Information Professionals (AIIP) was founded in 1987 in the United States by a group of independent information professionals (then more commonly known as information brokers) led by Marilyn Levine, a professor of library and information science at the University of Wisconsin. As personal computers had become much more common, many librarians and entrepreneurs thought that independent information services were viable. Thus, Levine and 25 other information professionals met in Milwaukee in 1987 to make an association for networking and to support information entrepreneurs.

AIIP adopted its Code of Ethical Business Practice in 1989, last revised in 2002.

== Membership ==
Members are mostly solo practitioners and small business entrepreneurs who specialize in many different aspects of the information profession. Library schools, business schools, and business books list AIIP as a professional resource.

== Activities ==
AIIP's activities include its webinars, virtual meetups, local events, a mentor program, the AIIP Connections blog, and a members-only e-mail discussion list.

AIIP members use the AIIP Annual Conference to network and partner, learn about vendors, and hone information professional skills and business management. The AIIP 2021 Annual Conference was held online 14–16 April 2021 due to the COVID-19 pandemic. Likewise, the AIIP Annual Conference will also be held online on 28 April to 1 May 2022.

== Governing structure ==
AIIP is led by a Board of Directors, comprising the President, President-Elect, Past President, Secretary, Treasurer and three Directors-at-Large. The President is elected to a three-year term, and appoints ad hoc committees as needed. The Secretary and Treasurer also serve for three-year terms; the Directors-at-Large serve for two-year terms. The Board is responsible for the strategic direction of the association and for leadership of the programs and services of the association. Any member may be a member of an AIIP committee, and full members may chair an AIIP committee. AIIP does not have local chapters.

== Awards ==
AIIP, like other akin organizations, recognizes the contributions of its members with sundry awards.

- AIIP Connections Writer's Award is an award of $350 awarded to the person who writes the best original article in the AIIP Connections blog.
- Marilyn Levine AIIP President's Award is given to the person or institution that best supports the goals of AIIP.
- Pam Wegmann International Award goes to a member living outside of North America in recognition of his or her contributions.
- Roger Summit Award Lecture features an information industry leader giving an inspirational speech.
- Roger Summit Conference Sponsorship Award is an award of $1,000 and free conference registration to an AIIP member attending his or her first AIIP Annual Conference.
- Sue Rugge Memorial Award is an award of $500 to full member who has greatly mentored another member.
- Volunteer Spotlight Award is a semi-annual award that recognizes members who have made great contributions in volunteering.
