= Cathy Edwards (software engineer) =

Australian software engineer and entrepreneur

Cathy Edwards is an Australian software engineer and entrepreneur. She co-founded and was chief technology officer of app search engine Chomp in 2009, which was acquired by Apple for $50 million in 2012. In 2021, she became vice president and general manager of Search at Google. In 2024, she moved back to Australia and joined Google's Long-term Bets team in Knowledge and Information.

== Career ==
Edwards studied linguistics, computer science, and pure mathematics at the University of Western Australia.

During her third year of university, she was awarded a national scholarship from Telstra, and joined their labs for a summer internship. There she prototyped the hardware and software for a wearable device allowed to text surreptitiously. After the research labs were shuttered in 2005, she moved into a role in the newly created chief technology office and managed a team of developers and designers to build prototypes of future mobile products. During this time, she worked in large-scale machine learning, natural language processing, and voice recognition.

Edwards later moved overseas to work as a project manager at 3jam, a text message developing company based in San Francisco. She then joined Friendster where she led the team of mobile product management. There she launched a novel revenue based on Friendster-only data packs and SMS packs sold via phone carriers.

After one and a half years living in the Silicon Valley, she partnered with her Australian friend Ben Keighran to start a company called Chomp in 2009. There, she operated as the leading engineer and product designer. The start-up company offered a search engine for app discovery, and powered search for the Verizon app store, Best Buy in the UK, Blekko, DuckDuckGo, and many others. The company filed 11 patents for their product, and offered an innovative search engine for content-based app search as opposed to name-based search. The technology brought together a new machine learning technique called topic modeling with traditional informational retrieval methodologies. Chomp launched on iPhone in January 2010 and on Android in February 2011. It was acquired by Apple for $50 million in 2012.

Edwards then joined Apple and was the Head of Search for iTunes, the App Store, and Maps before becoming Director of Evaluation and Quality for Maps.

Edwards left Apple in April 2014 and founded a new stealth startup Undecidable Labs in 2015 with some ex-Chomp colleagues, which was acquired by Google in 2016. As of 2021 she was VP of Engineering, leading Google Apps, Google News, Google Discover.
