= Republik =

Swiss German-language magazine

- Categories: Information Technology, Politics, Economics, Law, Science, Culture
- Frequency: daily
- Format: n.a. (online)
- Paid circulation: >34'000
- Founded: 21 April 2017; 9 years ago
- First issue: 14 January 2018; 8 years ago
- Country: Switzerland
- Based in: Zürich
- Language: German
- Website: www.republik.ch (in German)
- ISSN: 2624-8638

Republik is a Swiss online news magazine launched in 2018. Funded primarily by its readers, the magazine emphasizes investigative journalism, reader-journalist interaction, and long format journalism. The magazine editors and founders have also created Project R, an effort to promote the long-term sustainability of high quality journalism in Switzerland.

== Founding ==
Republik was first established in January 2018, after a record-breaking crowdfunding effort in 2017. The magazine raised 750,0000 Swiss francs and attracted 3,000 new subscribers in the first seven hours following its launch. It raised an additional 3.4 million francs in the next five weeks, and according to the Associated Press, 7.7 million francs by mid-January 2018. Republik is independent and is funded by readers, not advertisement, and accrued over 15,000 subscribers within the first months of opening. The magazine's tagline is "Without journalism, no democracy." Republik's manifesto states that it is "financed without advertising: Our readers are the only customers. And consequently our bosses."

The magazine modeled itself after De Correspondent, a Dutch news site.

== Journalism ==
Republik publishes between one and three articles every day, focusing on the quality of news rather than quantity. One journalist for the magazine has stated that it tries to emphasize intersectionality in its coverage: viewing a story from a diversity of perspectives or disciplines.

After Republik publishes news stories, it hosts live discussion and debate fora with its readers. The magazine's creators and journalists state that critical reader feedback and community is a defining characteristic of their project.

The magazine has tended to focus on political and international topics, but has also published an exposé on construction fraud in a small Swiss town, a report on a controversial Swiss mosque, and tax evasion by the rich in Europe. Republik also published an interview with UN Special Rapporteur on Torture Nils Melzer, discussing the case of Julian Assange. According to the Columbia Journalism Review, Republik has sought to write stories less dominated by US President Donald Trump, and instead focus on Swiss politics.

== Project R ==
Prior to Republik's launch, its founding team created "Project R," a cooperative nonprofit meant to promote the long-term viability of journalism in Switzerland through organization and education. The project remains an important pillar for the magazine.

== Reception ==
Christine Schmidt at Harvard's Nieman Foundation for Journalism has written that "Republik is living up to the hype" through investigative journalism, and an online community that allows readers to interact with journalists. According to the Columbia Journalism Review, the magazine's investigative work "have given Republik a burgeoning reputation in Switzerland," and earned it praise in Switzerland's Tages-Anzeiger newspaper.

== Employees ==
The editor-in-chief position was originally intended to rotate every three months, following an initial six-month period during which co-founders Constantin Seibt and Christof Moser led Republik's editorial team. At the end of October 2018, managing director Susanne Sugimoto, board chairman Laurent Burst, cooperative president Nadja Schnetzler, and finance director François Zosso withdrew from the company.

== See also ==
- List of national newspapers
- List of newspapers in Switzerland
