= NASA Star and Exoplanet Database =

Astronomical database

- Website type: Astronomy
- Creator: Operated for NASA by JPL/Caltech
- Website: http://nsted.ipac.caltech.edu
- Current status: Closed

The NASA Star and Exoplanet Database (NStED) was an on-line astronomical stellar and exoplanet catalog and data service that collated and cross-correlated astronomical data and information on exoplanets and their host stars. NStED was dedicated to collecting and serving important public data sets involved in the search for and characterization of exoplanets and their host stars. The data included stellar parameters (such as positions, magnitudes, and temperatures), exoplanet parameters (such as masses and orbital parameters) and discovery/characterization data (such as published radial velocity curves, photometric light curves, images, and spectra).

The NStED collected and served public data to support the search for and characterization of extra-solar planets (exoplanets) and their host stars. The data included published light curves, images, spectra and parameters, and time-series data from surveys that aim to discover transiting exoplanets. All data were validated by the NStED science staff and traced to their sources. NStED was the U.S. data portal for the CoRoT mission.

As of June 2007, the database catalogued 140,230 stars, but by December 2011, NStED was discontinued, with most data and services transferred to the NASA Exoplanet Archive.

== Search characteristics ==
Data were searchable either for an individual star or by stellar and planetary properties.

NStED offered direct access to frequently accessed tables:

- List of all known planets
- List of all known planet-hosting stars

== Survey programs ==
NStED also served photometric time-series data from surveys that aim to discover transiting exoplanets such as Kepler and CoRoT. NStED provided access to over 500,000 light curves from space and ground-based exoplanet transit survey programs, including:

- Kepler
- CoRoT
- HATNet Project
- Trans-Atlantic Exoplanet Survey
- KELT

The transit survey data were linked to an online periodogram service that could be used to search for periods in the transit survey data sets. A user could also upload their own time series data to search for periods in their own data.

The planetary orbital parameters were linked to an online transit ephemeris prediction tool which could be used to predict the probability that an exoplanet may transit and the date/time and observability of the transits.

== See also ==
- Extrasolar Planets Encyclopaedia
- Exoplanet Data Explorer
