= LiveRamp =

American SaaS data connectivity platform

LiveRamp Holdings, Inc.
- Formerly: Acxiom Holdings, Inc.
- Type: Public company
- Traded as: NYSE: RAMP
- Industry: Data connectivity, Data onboarding, Identity resolution
- Founded: 2011; 15 years ago in San Francisco, CA, U.S.
- Headquarters: San Francisco, California, U.S.
- Key people: Scott Howe, CEO; Warren Jenson, CFO; Auren Hoffman, Co-Founder; Travis May, Co-Founder
- Products: ATS, IdentityLink, Safe Haven, Privacy Manager
- Revenue: US$617 million (2020)
- Number of employees: 3,380
- Website: liveramp.com

LiveRamp Holdings, Inc. (commonly LiveRamp), is an American SaaS company that offers a data connectivity platform whose services include data onboarding, the transfer of offline data online for marketing purposes.

The company now known as LiveRamp was created from the combination of Acxiom (founded in 1969) and a company it acquired named LiveRamp in 2014. The company eventually took the LiveRamp name, after spinning off the Acxiom Marketing Services (AMS) division to global advertising network Interpublic Group of Companies.

The company has offices in the United States, Europe, Australia, and Asia.

== History ==
=== Acxiom foundation and early years ===
Acxiom was founded in 1969 as Demographics, Inc. by Charles D. Ward in Conway, Arkansas. The company was initially involved in producing mailing lists using phonebooks and payroll processing. In 1980, the company changed its name to Conway Communications Exchange, and in 1983, it incorporated as CCX Network, Inc. and made its first public offering. In 1988 it became Acxiom Corporation.

=== 1990s ===
In November 1997, Acxiom acquired Buckley Dement, a provider of healthcare fulfillment and professional medical lists. In May 1998, Acxiom made the announcement that it would acquire one of its competitors, May & Speh.

=== 2000s ===
In 2003, Wired Magazine criticized the company for only accepting third-party consumer opt-out requests from the Direct Marketing Association. In early 2004, Acxiom acquired part of Claritas, a European data provider. In 2005, Acxiom acquired Digital Impact for $140 million and integrated its digital and online services into its business. In 2005 Acxiom was a nominee for the Big Brother Awards for Worst Corporate Invader for a tradition of data brokering.

In early 2006, EMC Corporation acquired Acxiom’s information grid software in a $30 million deal. EMC later declined to exercise an option to acquire additional resources from Acxiom and discontinued work on the software.

On May 16, 2007, Acxiom agreed to be bought by investment firms Silver Lake Partners and ValueAct Capital in an all-cash deal valued at $3 billion, including the assumption of about $756 million of debt. However, in October 2007, citing poor credit markets, the companies terminated the deal. The company also announced that Chairman Charles Morgan was retiring upon the selection of a successor. On January 17, 2008, Acxiom named John Meyer (from Alcatel-Lucent) as new CEO and president. On July 11, 2008, Acxiom acquired ChoicePoint's database marketing solutions division.

=== Early 2010s ===
In 2010, Acxiom acquired part of GoDigital, a Brazilian direct marketing and data quality company. In October 2010, the company launched AbiliTec Digital, a web-based tool to match digital identities to traditional name and address data, such as that collected from loyalty programs. On July 27, 2011, Acxiom named Scott E. Howe, as the company’s chief executive officer and president.

In December 2011, Acxiom announced the sale of its background screening business, Acxiom Information Security Services (AISS), to Sterling Infosystems, now SterlingBackcheck. In 2012, the NY Times reported that the company had the world’s largest commercial database on consumers. In 2013, CNBC announced that the Federal Trade Commission was investigating Acxiom and eight other companies to learn how they collected and used consumer data.

=== Acquisition of LiveRamp ===
On May 14, 2014, Acxiom announced that it had acquired LiveRamp, a data onboarding company, for $310 million. LiveRamp was co-founded in 2011 by Travis May and Auren Hoffman as a spinout of RapLeaf, a marketing data and software company founded in San Francisco, California in 2005 by Hoffman and Manish Shah. LiveRamp's services combined customers' CRM and loyalty program data with other available data sources, to better segment and target consumers. Acxiom kept the business operating under the LiveRamp name under the leadership of May.

In July 2015, the company sold its IT outsourcing division, Acxiom IT Outsourcing (Acxiom ITO), to Charlesbank Capital Partners and M/C Partners, and Acxiom ITO was subsequently rebranded as Ensono. In December, Acxiom acquired the Boston-based advanced-advertising unit of Allant, a third-party data shop focused on advertising and marketing.

In November 2016, LiveRamp acquired two data and identity-matching startups, Arbor and Circulate, for more than $140 million combined. The company also announced the launch of IdentityLink, a method of anonymizing consumer's identities as they are tracked across multiple platforms. In August 2016, Acxiom sold its marketing automation solution, Acxiom Impact, for $50 million, to New York City-based marketing firm Zeta Interactive, now Zeta Global. The company was also named in Glassdoor's top small company to work for.

By 2017, LiveRamp was reportedly worth $1.5 billion. In January 2017, Acxiom launched Audience Cloud, an anonymous targeting tool that allowed demographic segmentation of customers without revealing their actual identities. On March 10, Acxiom announced that it was moving its headquarters back to Conway, Arkansas after selling its corporate office building in Little Rock, Arkansas. The building was acquired by Simmons Bank. In May, LiveRamp announced a consortium formed with two other ad tech companies, AppNexus and MediaMath, to compete with Facebook and Google in the area of programmatic advertising, the term used to refer to the use of automation software to buy advertising.

In February 2018, LiveRamp acquired Pacific Data Partners, an aggregator of anonymized business data. Also in February, Acxiom announced a reorganization from three divisions into two - a Marketing Solutions group and its LiveRamp business. In May, the company announced international expansion into Brazil, Netherlands, and Italy, and released Global Data Navigator (GDN), a portal for identifying available data elements by country. In June 2018, Consumer research firm GfK MRI has partnered with Acxiom. In July, advertising company Interpublic Group of Companies (IPG) announced they were buying Acxiom's Marketing Solutions (AMS) business for $USD2.3 billion. The deal did not include the LiveRamp business. Also in July, LiveRamp announced a partnership with tracking software company Sonobi to help publishers sell targeted digital ads. The sale of the Marketing Solutions business to IPG closed in October, and Acxiom officially changed its name to LiveRamp, and its ticker symbol to RAMP. The Acxiom brand was transferred to IPG alongside the AMS business unit.

In April 2019, LiveRamp acquired consent management platform provider Faktor. In July, LiveRamp acquired the Boston-based television analytics company Data Plus Math for $150 million.

=== 2020s ===
In January 2020, the company launched its own consent management platform, called Privacy Manager. In March, the company launched Safe Haven, a tool allowing advertisers and media owners to share customer data while following privacy laws. In July, LiveRamp acquired Acuity Data to enhance Safe Haven’s retail trade analytics capabilities.

In May 2026, French advertising firm Publicis announced an agreement to acquire LiveRamp for $38.50 per share in an all-cash deal, representing an enterprise value of approximately $2.2 billion and a nearly 30% premium to LiveRamp's prior closing price. Some businesses have expressed concern over Publicis now having access to their data, though Publicis says LiveRamp will remain neutral. The deal remains subject to approval by shareholders and regulators before finalizing.

== Products and services ==
LiveRamp's products and services allow clients to combine customer data from various online and offline sources. Their products include:

- Authenticated Traffic Solutions (ATS), a tool for publishers and advertisers to connect their data sources without using web cookies
- Data Marketplace, formerly IdentityLink Data Store, allows customers to highlight and activate customer data sets for targeted marketing purposes
- Data Plus Math, providing media measurement for brands, agencies, cable operators, streaming services, and networks to determine who is watching their ads, and matching it with other consumer behavior data
- Onboarding, which allows companies to analyze online and television first-party data. All personally identifiable information (PII) is removed from the data, and is replaced with anonymized IDs.
- Privacy Manager, a consent management platform supporting data compliance.
- Safe Haven, a tool for advertisers and retailers to share and analyze customer transaction data without violating privacy guidelines

== Regulatory and security matters ==
=== Electronic Privacy Information Center (2003) ===
In 2003, the Electronic Privacy Information Center filed a complaint before the Federal Trade Commission against LiveRamp predecessor Acxiom and JetBlue Airways, alleging the companies provided consumer information to Torch Concepts, a company hired by the United States Army "to determine how information from public and private records might be analyzed to help defend military bases from attack by terrorists and other adversaries."

According to the complaint, Acxiom's activities constituted unfair and deceptive trade practices, as "Acxiom has publicly represented its belief that individuals should have noticed about how information about them is used and have choices about that dissemination, and has stated that it does not permit clients to make non-public information available to individuals", yet Acxiom proceeded to sell information to Torch Concepts without obtaining consent or providing the ability to opt-out, or furnishing notice to the affected consumers.

The FTC took no action against Acxiom, which responded that it had followed its privacy principles and was not deceptive in its business practices. "Torch Concepts was acting under contract to the Department of Defense in their efforts to research ways to improve military base security", a company spokesman said. "Our policy clearly states that we 'provide information products which include financial information, Social Security number and other related information where permitted by law,' and that this information is 'provided to government agencies for the purposes of verifying information, employment screening and assisting law enforcement.'"

=== Security breach (2003) ===
In 2003, more than 1.6 billion customer records were stolen during the transmission of information to and from LiveRamp predecessor Acxiom's clients; the information included names, addresses, and e-mail addresses. Prosecutors described the 2006 case against the hacker accused of stealing the data as the "largest ever invasion and theft of personal data" ever tried. The stolen data came to light during an investigation of a separate data theft incident.

Based on their investigation, prosecutors said there was no risk of identity theft or harm to individuals based on the breaches. They also praised Acxiom for being aggressive in pursuing the hackers and cooperating with authorities. "The positive outcome of this investigation is testament to the strong partnerships we have established with our counterparts at the headquarters and field offices of various organizations, from the FBI and Department of Justice to the Internal Revenue Service and U.S. Attorney's Office in Little Rock", said K. C. Crowley, Special Agent in Charge of Secret Service's Little Rock Field Office. "Furthermore, I commend Acxiom Corporation for their cooperation and responsible approach to the situation. Acxiom's quick response in contacting federal investigators after determining there had been a network intrusion should serve as a model for others in similar circumstances."

The two primary hackers were sentenced to lengthy (8 years) prison terms.

== Locations ==
LiveRamp's headquarters is located in San Francisco, California, United States. The company has additional U.S. offices in Little Rock, Arkansas; New York, New York; Seattle, Washington; Boston, Massachusetts; Phoenix, Arizona; and Philadelphia, Pennsylvania. International offices are located in the United Kingdom, France, Australia, China, Japan and Singapore.
