= BackTweets =

Twitter analytics tool

- Type: Private
- Industry: Internet; Web Analytics
- Founded: March 2009
- Website: backtweets.com

BackTweets is a Twitter (now X) analytics tool which allows users to search through a Tweet archive for links, including shortened URLs that were sent on Twitter.

== History ==
BackTweets was developed by BackType and released on Friday March 6, 2009. A short time after its launch, the service received significant media attention, most notably from Twitter and popular social media news site Mashable. In March 2011 BackType raised $1 million in seed funding from investors such as True Ventures, K9 Ventures, Freestyle Capital, Founder Collective and others. This was in addition to the $315,000 in funding it had raised previously from Y Combinator and True Ventures. On July 5, 2011 BackType announced that it had been purchased by Twitter, would be relocating to Twitter's offices and would be discontinuing BackType and its API. A few months after the acquisition the BackTweets service was shut down.

On March 6, 2012 the domain BackTweets.com was bought in a public auction by Sorezki Ltd. who re-launched the site as a free service.

== Function ==
BackTweets enables individuals, companies and their competitors to gauge the quantity and quality of their Twitter reach by showing the number of times a link was tweeted as well as the actual tweet that was made. From a business perspective, the BackTweets service can help corporations understand how individuals interact with their brand. The service requires neither a username nor registration to the site. As opposed to Twitter's search capacity, BackTweets tracks all links which were tweeted, regardless of the form they were shared in, which prevents users from getting fragmented information about their Twitter link presence. In response to a search, tweets are returned in reverse chronological order with the most recent tweets appearing first in the list.
