= Inspec =

Indexing database

- Producer: Institution of Engineering and Technology (United Kingdom)
- History: 1872–present

Access
- Providers: Inspec Direct, Datastar, Dialog, EBSCO Publishing, Elsevier, WTI-Frankfurt, Thomson Innovation, Web of Science, Ovid, Questel.Orbit, STN
- Cost: Subscription

Coverage
- Disciplines: Physics, Computer science, Mechanical engineering, Electrical engineering, Electronic engineering, Communications, Control engineering, Information technology, Manufacturing, Mechanical engineering
- Record depth: Index & abstract
- Format coverage: Journal articles, Standards, Patents, Thesis and Conference proceedings
- Temporal coverage: 1969–present
- Geospatial coverage: Global
- No. of records: Over 17,000,000 and growing
- Update frequency: Weekly

Links
- Website: www.theiet.org/resources/inspec/
- Title list(s): www.theiet.org/resources/inspec/support/docs/loj.cfm?type=pdf

Inspec is a major indexing database of scientific and technical literature, published by the Institution of Engineering and Technology (IET), and formerly by the Institution of Electrical Engineers (IEE), one of the IET's forerunners.

Inspec coverage is extensive in the fields of physics, computing, control, and engineering. Its subject coverage includes astronomy, electronics, communications, computers and computing, computer science, control engineering, electrical engineering, information technology, physics, manufacturing, production and mechanical engineering. Now, due to emerging concept of technology for business, Inspec also includes information technology for business in its portfolio. Inspec indexed few journals publishing high quality research by integrating technology into management, economics and social sciences domains. The sample journals include Annual Review of Financial Economics, Aslib Journal of Information Management, Australian Journal of Management and, International Journal of Management, Economics and Social Sciences.

Inspec was started in 1967 as an outgrowth of the Science Abstracts service. The electronic records were distributed on magnetic tape. In the 1980s, it was available in the U.S. through the Knowledge Index, a low-priced dial-up version of the Dialog service for individual users, which made it popular. For nearly 50 years, the IET has employed scientists to manually review items to be included in Inspec, hand-indexing the literature using their own expertise of the subject area and make a judgement call about which terms and classification codes should be applied. Thanks to this work, a significant thesaurus has been developed which enables content to be indexed far more accurately and in context, which in turn helps end-users discover relevant literature that may otherwise have remained hidden from typical search queries, making Inspec an essential tool for prior art, patentability searches and patent drafting.

Access to Inspec is currently by the Internet through Inspec Direct and various resellers.

== Print counterparts ==
Inspec has several print counterparts:

- Computer and Control Abstracts (ISSN 0036-8113)
- Electrical and Electronics Abstracts (ISSN 0036-8105)
- Physics Abstracts (ISSN 0036-8091)
- Science Abstracts
- Electrical engineering Abstracts* Electronics Abstracts
- Control theory Abstracts
- Information technology Abstracts
- Physics Indexes
- Electrical engineering Indexes
- Electronics Indexes
- Control theory Indexes
- Information technology Indexes
- Business automation Abstracts (Journals featuring management, economics and Social Sciences; organizations; management information systems related research)

=== Computer and Control Abstracts ===
Computer and Control Abstracts (ISSN 0036-8113 Frequency: 12 per year) covers computers and computing, and information technology.

=== Electrical and Electronics Abstracts ===
Electrical and Electronics Abstracts (ISSN 0036-8105 Frequency: 12 per year) covers all topics in telecommunications, electronics, radio, electrical power and optoelectronics. Printed indexes by subject, author and other indexes, and a subject guide are produced twice per year.

=== Physics Abstracts ===
Physics Abstracts (ISSN 0036-8091 LCCN 76-646597 Frequency: 24 per year) is an abstracting and indexing service first published by the Institution of Electrical Engineers. It was first circulated as Science Abstracts, volume 1 through volume 5 from 1898 to 1902. From 1903 to 1971 the database had different titles. These closely related names were Science Abstracts. Section A, Physics and Science Abstracts. Section A, Physics Abstracts from volume 6 to volume 74.

By 1972 other societies were associated as authors of this service such as the American Institute of Physics. In 1975 or 1976 the Institute of Electrical and Electronics Engineers also became an author. By 1980 this database was also issued as INSPEC-Physics on various formats. It was also available as part of INSPEC database. Presently it is part of Inspec, Section A - Physics database. At the same time, the Physics Abstracts title was employed throughout the 1990s.

=== Notable editor ===
The science fiction writer Arthur C. Clarke, with a B.S. degree (physics and mathematics honors) (King's college), was an assistant editor for Physics Abstracts from 1949 to 1951. This position allowed Clarke to access to "all of the world's leading scientific journals."

=== Science Abstracts ===
The first issue of Science Abstracts was published in January 1898. During that first year, a total of 1,423 abstracts were published at monthly intervals, and at the end of the year an author and subject index were added. The first issue contained 110 abstracts and was divided into 10 sections:

- General Physics
- Light
- Heat
- Sound
- Electricity
- Electrochemistry and Chemical Physics
- General Electrical Engineering
- Dynamos, Electric Motors and Transformers
- Electric power distribution, Traction and Lighting
- Telegraphy and Telephony

Science Abstracts was the result of a joint collaboration between the Institution of Electrical Engineers (IEE) and The Physical Society of London. The publication was (at that time) provided without charge to all members of both societies. The cost of the publication was mainly borne by the IEE and The Physical Society. Financial contributions were also received from the Institution of Civil Engineers, The Royal Society and the British Association for the Advancement of Science

By 1902, the annual number of abstracts published had increased to 2,362. By May 1903 it was decided to split the publication into two parts: A (Physics) and B (Electrical Engineering). This decision allowed the subject's scope to widen, particularly in physics. As a result, this allowed a larger quantity of material to be covered.

Since 1967, electronic access to Science Abstracts has been provided by INSPEC.

== See also ==
- List of academic databases and search engines
