= RapLeaf =

Database marketing company

- Type: Private company
- Industry: Database marketing
- Founded: March 2005
- Headquarters: Evanston, Illinois, USA
- Key people: Auren Hoffman, Manish Shah
- Number of employees: 11–50 (as of November 2, 2012)
- Parent: TowerData
- Website: www.rapleaf.com

RapLeaf was a US-based marketing data and software company that was acquired by email data provider TowerData in 2013.

== History ==
RapLeaf was founded in San Francisco by Auren Hoffman and Manish Shah in March 2005. In May 2006 the Founders Fund led a seed round of about $1 million, including angel investors such as Peter Thiel and Ron Conway. In June 2007 a second round included Founders Fund, Rembrandt Venture Partners and included Conway.

The company's first product was a meta-reputation system that allows users to create reviews and ratings of consumer transactions, which they then contribute to multiple e-commerce websites. On January 26, 2007, RapLeaf released Upscoop, a service that allowed users to search for and manage their contacts by email address across multiple social networking sites.

In 2011, RapLeaf created a data onboarding division named LiveRamp, which later spun out into an independent company which was acquired by Acxiom in 2014 for $310 million.

In 2012, RapLeaf began selling segmented data tied to email addresses for marketers to personalize email communications. Around September 2012 the company moved its headquarters from San Francisco to Chicago, and Phil Davis became chief executive, replacing Hoffman.

RapLeaf was acquired by TowerData in 2013.

== Controversy and backlash ==
On May 15, 2006, eBay removed a number of auction listings where the seller had included links to RapLeaf, claiming they were in violation of its terms of use.

In late August 2007, Upscoop began e-mailing entire contact lists that were provided by their users when they log in. This caused some criticism, and the company later apologized for doing so.

On July 10, 2008, RapLeaf changed its interface so that it no longer allows users to search people by email addresses. Instead, the service only allows a registered user to view their own reputation and the websites (social and business networking) to which their own e-mail address is registered. There was an immediate negative backlash by companies and individuals who had been using RapLeaf to both manage reputations and investigate the authenticity of people.

In October 2010, the Wall Street Journal reported that RapLeaf had transmitted personally identifiable information, including Facebook and MySpace IDs. RapLeaf said it had inadvertently transmitted that info and had ceased the practice. On October 28, 2010, Facebook banned RapLeaf from scraping data on Facebook, and RapLeaf said it would delete the Facebook IDs it had collected. A 2011 report showed that the company could tell the food preferences of employees from major companies.

Between 2007 and 2013, RapLeaf received significant backlash over the data collection practices and sale of individuals' personal information to advertisers. As a public spokesperson for the company, much of the criticism was directed at the CEO Auren Hoffman personally. A 2010 investigation by The Wall Street Journal revealed that the company transmitted identifying details about individuals to at least 12 companies, violating the terms of service of Facebook and MySpace. A spokesperson at Facebook said it had "taken steps. . .to significantly limit RapLeaf's ability to use any Facebook-related data." When confronted by The Wall Street Journal and CNet, it quietly revised its privacy policy both times. CNNMoney described RapLeaf as "selling your identity," and TechCrunch characterized its method of identifiable data extraction of Google and Microsoft employees as "creepy." RapLeaf later became known as LiveRamp after entering new markets. LiveRamp spun off the RapLeaf business and sold it to TowerData in 2013.

== See also ==
- LexisNexis
