= Darren Keighran =

Australian rules footballer

Personal information
- Full name: Darren Keighran
- Born: 30 November 1969 (age 56)
- Original team: Lake Boga
- Height: 188 cm (6 ft 2 in)
- Weight: 83 kg (183 lb)

Playing career^{1}
Years	Club	Games (Goals)
1990	Richmond	2 (0)
- ^{1} Playing statistics correct to the end of 1990.

Darren Keighran (born 30 November 1969) is a former Australian rules footballer who played with Richmond in the Australian Football League (AFL).

Keighran came to Richmond from Lake Boga and appeared in the third and fourth rounds of the 1990 AFL season, losses to Hawthorn and Essendon.
