= Data onboarding =

Data collecting technique for marketing

Data onboarding is the process of transferring offline data to an online environment for marketing needs. Data onboarding is mainly used to connect offline customer records with online users by matching identifying information gathered from offline datasets to retrieve the same customers in an online audience.

More specifically, data onboarding links personally identifiable information held in offline sources—such as sales transactions, loyalty programs, or CRM systems—with non-PII digital identifiers like browser cookies, IP addresses, and device IDs to create unified consumer profiles for targeting and measurement.

== Process ==
The onboarding process involves ingesting, anonymizing, matching and distributing a customer's data. Offline data used in onboarding efforts include information such as customer names, email addresses, physical addresses and phone numbers as well as CRM and sales transaction data. Part of the data onboarding process is anonymizing personally identifiable information to protect consumer privacy. Another key step involves matching offline data to online devices, such as a desktop browser cookie or mobile device ID. Offline data like a customer's email address or postal address can also be used as an identifier to match to digital IDs, such as a Facebook or X (formerly Twitter) account. Matched data is finally delivered to a technology platform for use in programmatic marketing.

A key metric in data onboarding is the match rate, which refers to the percentage of offline records that can be successfully linked to online identifiers. Match rates depend on the quality and completeness of input data, the matching methodology used (deterministic or probabilistic), and the persistence of identifiers such as cookies or device IDs. Deterministic matching relies on explicit identifiers such as email addresses or login data to link records at the individual level, while probabilistic matching uses statistical models and patterns across data signals to infer connections.

Data onboarding is primarily used to reach a company's customers with more relevant marketing messages. Companies can also use onboarded data to assess the effectiveness of a marketing campaign or the purchasing trends of their customers. Overall, the process enables marketers to use offline customer data to inform online campaign decisions.

== Application ==
The data onboarding industry consists of marketing technology companies like LiveRamp, FullContact, Semcasting, Datalogix (now part of Oracle Data Cloud), Throtle, Acho Studio, Neustar, El Toro, Circulate, and TrueData, which develops onboarding services for marketers. Businesses use data onboarding companies to determine whether their ads were seen on digital platforms and if they were effective in driving sales. In 2013, Auren Hoffman, the founder of LiveRamp, estimated that one-third of Fortune 2000 marketers were onboarding data, with most of their clients being from the retail, travel, auto, telecommunications, financial services and publishing industries.

According to a 2016 report by the Winterberry Group, the U.S. data onboarding market grew from an estimated $30 million in revenue in 2012 to $250 million in 2016, with spending projected to reach $1 billion by 2020.

== Privacy and regulatory considerations ==
Data onboarding relies on the collection and matching of personally identifiable information, which has made the practice subject to increasing regulatory scrutiny. The General Data Protection Regulation (GDPR), enacted by the European Union in 2018, requires explicit opt-in consent before personal data can be processed, directly affecting how onboarding providers collect and match consumer records in European markets. The California Consumer Privacy Act (CCPA), effective in 2020, grants California residents the right to know what personal data is collected about them and to opt out of its sale, imposing additional compliance requirements on onboarding companies operating in the United States.

The deprecation of third-party cookies by major web browsers has further affected data onboarding practices. As browsers restrict third-party tracking, onboarding providers have increasingly shifted toward first-party data strategies and alternative identifiers such as hashed email addresses and authenticated login data. These changes have accelerated the adoption of identity resolution technologies, which aim to link consumer records across channels without relying on third-party cookies.
