= ProQuest Dialog =

Online information service

Dialog
- Website type: Online database
- Owner: ProQuest
- Creator: Roger K. Summit
- Website: dialog.com
- Commercial: Yes
- Launched: 1966

Dialog is an online information service owned by Clarivate. Clarivate acquired Proquest, who acquired Dialog from Thomson Reuters in mid-2008.

Dialog was one of the predecessors of the World Wide Web as a provider of information, though not in form. The earliest form of the Dialog system was completed in 1966 in Lockheed under the direction of Roger K. Summit. According to its literature, it was "the world's first online information retrieval system to be used globally with materially significant databases". In the 1980s, a low-priced dial-up version of a subset of Dialog was marketed to individual users as Knowledge Index. This subset included INSPEC, MathSciNet, over 200 other bibliographic and reference databases, as well as third-party retrieval vendors who would go to physical libraries to copy materials for a fee and send it to the service subscriber.

While being owned by the Thomson Corporation, Dialog consisted of the Dialog, DataStar, Profound, and NewsEdge businesses. Dialog and DataStar were consolidated into Dialog. The news content from Profound and NewsEdge were consolidated, and the market research business from Profound was sold to MarketResearch.com. The NewsEdge business was eventually sold to Acquire Media, which merged into Naviga before being sold again to Moodys Analytics. Prior to being owned by Thomson, MAID purchased Knight-Ridder Information which included the Dialog and DataStar businesses. MAID renamed itself to be the Dialog Corporation.

== See also ==
- Colorado Alliance of Research Libraries
