= Ben Keighran =

Australian businessman and technology entrepreneur (born 1982)

Ben Keighran (born March 1982) is an Australian born technology entrepreneur and serial entrepreneur. He was the founder and CEO of social broadcasting platform Caffeine.

== Early life and education ==
Ben Keighran was born in March 1982 in Sydney, Australia. By the age of 13, Keighran had taught himself to code C++ and launched a popular bulletin board system that overwhelmed his parents' phone line.

== Career ==
In 2006, Ben Keighran relocated from Sydney to San Francisco, where he raised $6.5 million for his mobile social messaging application, Bluepulse.

Bluepulse launched in December 2006 as a social messaging app, where Keighran worked on designing a standard for publishing content on mobile, including text messages and other types of communications. A year after founding Bluepulse, in 2007 Keighran was named one of America's Top Entrepreneurs under 25 by BusinessWeek.

Keighran's next venture was serving as the lead advisor for social search service Aardvark's mobile strategy. Aardvark was eventually acquired by Google for $50 million in 2010.

After Aardvark, Keighran went on to found app search and discovery platform Chomp in 2009 which raised a little over $2.5 million over two rounds of funding from BlueRun Ventures, SV Angel founder Ron Conway, Aydin Senkut, David Lee, Brian Pokorny and Auren Hoffman. Ashton Kutcher and Digg founder Kevin Rose were also advisors to the company. Chomp was one of the earliest startups to offer both app search and personalized app recommendations for the iPhone app. Keighran led the company in developing its unique app search formula and filing 11 patents based on these new app search technologies and user experience. Chomp's iPhone app offered app search and personalized app recommendations as well, making the startup one of the earliest services to offer that mixed functionality. After expanding its services to Android, Chomp partnered with Verizon to offer an app search engine for the mobile network operator's mobile app marketplace, V Cast and all Verizon apps. In 2012, Chomp was acquired by Apple for $50 million and the technology was used to help overhaul the iTunes and App Store search experience.

After joining Apple, Keighran spent the next four years overseeing software design on the Apple TV. Keighran helped design the look and feel of the software featured in the 4th generation Apple TV. Keighran played a role in Apple TV's receival of an Emmy for its Siri integration. In 2016, Keighran left Apple to start his most recent company Caffeine.

Caffeine was a social broadcasting platform that delivered live, interactive content at the intersection of gaming, sports, and entertainment. Caffeine raised $146 million to date from investors in 3 rounds led by 21st Century Fox, Andreesen Horowitz, and Greylock Partners. Caffeine secured a $100 million investment in September 2018 from 21st Century Fox with chairman Lachlan Murdoch joining Caffeine's board, as well as the creation of a newly formed joint venture called Caffeine Studios. The studio produced exclusive gaming, esports, sports, and live entertainment content that was streamed to Caffeine's audience.

Caffeine ended their service on June 26, 2024, stating that they were not able to achieve profitability.
