= Auren Hoffman =

American businessman

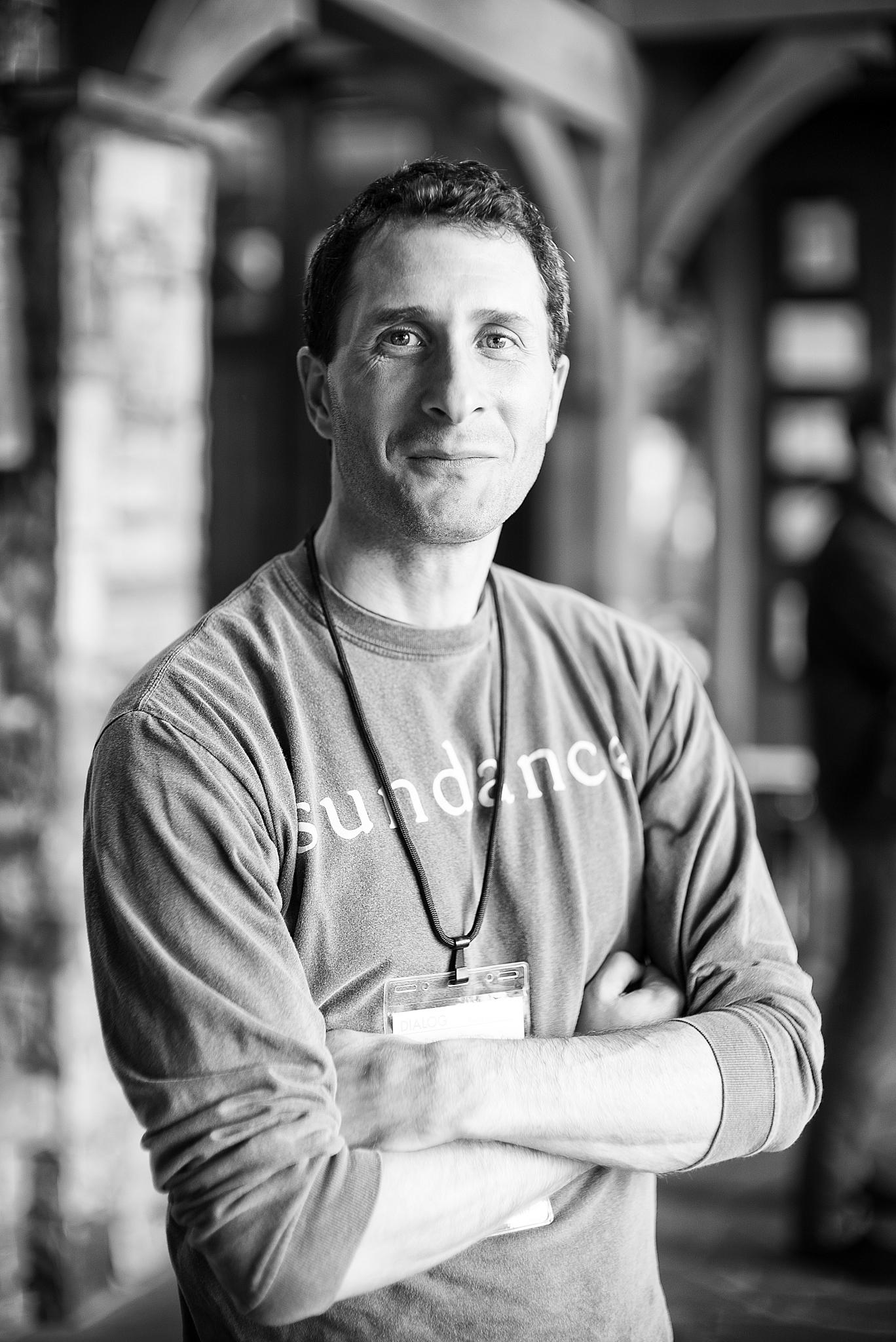
- Hoffman in 2015
- Born: Auren Raphael Hoffman; 1974 (age 51–52); Mamaroneck, New York, U.S.
- Education: University of California, Berkeley (BS)
- Spouse: Hallie Mitchell (m. 2011)
- Website: blog.summation.net

Auren Raphael Hoffman (born 1974) is an American entrepreneur, angel investor, and author. He is a general partner at Flex Capital, a venture capital tech investment firm. He is the founder and former CEO of SafeGraph, a company that gathers location data from mobile devices and sells anonymized data about human movement at an aggregated spatial level.

== Personal life ==
Hoffman is a son of Amalia Hoffman of Larchmont, New York, and Edward M. Hoffman of Montvale, New Jersey. Amalia Hoffman is an author and illustrator of children's books. Edward M. Hoffman works in New York as a software engineer and software consultant to the financial industry. Hoffman graduated from the University of California, Berkeley with a degree in Industrial Engineering in 1996.

Auren Raphael identifies as Jewish and frequently discusses his Jewish upbringing. Growing up in Highland Park, Illinois, a city with a large Jewish population, he attended a Hebrew Sunday school and was involved in Jewish youth groups.

In 2011, Hoffman married an assistant U.S. Attorney, Hallie Alexandra Mitchell, who graduated from Princeton University, and received a Juris Doctor degree from Northwestern University School of Law.

== Business ==
Hoffman founded Kyber Systems in his junior year at UC Berkeley, as a way to pay for school. Kyber was sold to Human Ingenuity in 1997. Hoffman founded Bridgepath Inc. in 1998, which was acquired by Bullhorn, Inc. in October 2002. In 2002 he sold the website GetRelevant to Lycos. He then became chair of the Stonebrick Group through 2006, which sponsored networking events in the San Francisco area such as the Silicon Forum. Hoffman's business style is sometimes referred to as a networker. Hoffman is a speaker at events in the technology industry.

In 2006 Hoffman co-founded Rapleaf and served as its CEO until 2012, when he left the company to run a Rapleaf spinoff called LiveRamp after Rapleaf was acquired by email marketing company TowerData. On May 14, 2014 Acxiom announced that it had acquired LiveRamp, for $310 Million. Gawker mentioned a controversy surrounding privacy practices at Rapleaf. Hoffman left LiveRamp a little more than a year after it was acquired. As of December 2016, Hoffman was chairman of Siftery, and was acting as a CEO for a company called SafeGraph until October 2024, when he stepped down and remained chairman.

== Writer ==
Hoffman was a contributor to the Huffington Post, often on political subjects, as well as Business Week and his own blog called Summation.

Hoffman is a Republican and a political contributor. Hoffman contributed to Council on Foreign Relations papers in 2004.

== Controversy ==
In 2006, Wikipedia editors detected that Hoffman may have been editing his own Wikipedia entry, violating its guidelines. Silicon Valley media publicized the evidence, which Hoffman eventually confirmed to VentureBeat in 2007. Anonymous Wikipedia editors later edited out these references. Hoffman has also been criticized for his personal and professional networking practices and presentation of his own reputation.

From 2007 to 2013, Hoffman received significant backlash over the data collection practices and sale of individuals' personal information to advertisers by his company, RapLeaf. As a prolific blogger and public spokesperson for the company, much of the criticism was directed at Hoffman personally.. A 2010 investigation by The Wall Street Journal revealed that the company transmitted identifying details about individuals to at least 12 companies, violating the terms of service of Facebook and MySpace.

A spokesperson at Facebook said it had "taken steps... to significantly limit Rapleaf's ability to use any Facebook-related data." When confronted by The Wall Street Journal and CNet, it quietly revised its privacy policy both times. CNNMoney described RapLeaf as "selling your identity," and TechCrunch characterized its method of identifiable data extraction of Google and Microsoft employees as "creepy." In August 2012, Rapleaf became a wholly owned subsidiary of LiveRamp. TowerData purchased Rapleaf's assets in October 2013, and Acxiom acquired LiveRamp in May 2014.

=== Safegraph ===
Beginning in 2020, Hoffman's company Safegraph received criticism for its practice of collecting and selling location data from mobile phones. Public records requests by the Electronic Frontier Foundation revealed that between 2018 and 2020, Safegraph and its spin-off company Veraset sold or gave disaggregate, device-specific location data about millions of people to government agencies in the U.S. In 2021, Google banned Safegraph from its Android app marketplace for violating its policies. Developers who had installed Safegraph's software development kit (SDK) in their apps were forced to remove the code or have their apps taken down by Google.

In May 2022, Motherboard was able to purchase data from Safegraph which revealed aggregate information about the movements of people who visited clinics that provide abortions, including Planned Parenthood. According to the report, the data showed "where groups of people visiting the locations came from, how long they stayed there, and where they then went afterwards." The report generated concern among pro-choice advocates due to news about the impending decision in Dobbs v. Jackson Women's Health Organization, which would make abortion illegal in many states.

Shortly after Motherboard's report was published, Hoffman announced that Safegraph would stop selling data about movements to and from family planning centers, saying the data did not have commercial value.

=== Dialog ===
Hoffman and Peter Thiel co-founded Dialog, a private, invitation-only society.

== Investments ==
Hoffman is an angel investor and briefly worked as a venture capitalist with the Founders Fund in the 2011 to 2012 timeframe.

Some of Hoffman's investments include: Aardvark (search engine) (sold to Google), BackTweets by Backtype (sold to Twitter), Blip.tv, BrightRoll, Chomp (search engine) (sold to Apple), CrowdFlower, Flowtown (sold to Demandforce which was sold to Intuit), Founders Fund, LabPixies (sold to Google), Meebo (sold to Google), MerchantCircle (sold to Reply.com), mob.ly (sold to GroupOn), Pingboard, Scopely, Thumbtack (website), Zoom Systems, and others.
