= Pray.com =

Religion-focused social networking service

- Industry: Faith-based media and technology
- Founded: 2016; 10 years ago
- Founders: Steve Gatena, Michael Lynn, Ryan Beck, and Matthew Potter
- Website: pray.com

Pray.com is a Christian social networking service and mobile application designed to facilitate religious communities. Launched in 2016, it was founded by Steve Gatena, Michael Lynn, Ryan Beck and Matthew Potter. The platform offers features for social networking, daily prayers, sermons, biblical content, and podcasts.

The COVID-19 pandemic significantly increased Pray.com's user base, with downloads surging by 955%. During this period, the platform collaborated with churches to support virtual ministry services as in-person gatherings were restricted. The Federal Election Commission issued an opinion in 2021 that allows the platform to feature members of the United States Congress. In 2020, the company suffered a major security incident exposing sensitive data of millions of users.

Pray.com serves as a specialized social media platform for religious groups. Congregations can establish their own groups where members and leaders can participate in discussions, livestream services, and manage donations. Additionally, users can join "prayer communities" to post and respond to prayer requests. For those who subscribe to premium services, the platform provides access to biblically-inspired meditations and bedtime stories, and Bible stories for children. Pray.com also produces Radio drama-style productions with actors such as Kristen Bell and Blair Underwood narrating biblical stories.

== History ==
=== Funding and development ===
In 2017, the platform raised US$2 million in seed funding from Science Inc., Greylock Partners, and Spark Capital. This was followed by a Series A funding round in March 2018, in which the company secured an additional US$14,000,000 (equivalent to $17,949,907 in 2025) from TPG Growth, Science Inc., and Greylock Partners. Founder Steve Gatena has highlighted difficulties in securing funding, noting some venture capitalists' negative attitudes towards faith-based technology.

=== US National Day of Prayer ===
Pray first hosted a National Day of Prayer event in 2020 when it streamed to nearly one million viewers on Facebook. In 2021, Pray hosted a virtual event for the National Day of Prayer in the United States. The event featured remarks from public figures including United States President Joe Biden and former Vice President Mike Pence. President Biden spoke of his faith and prayed for an end to the COVID-19 pandemic. Biden remarked: "It means the world to me to know that there are people across the country who include Jill and me in their prayers. And I hope you know that you and your families are in our prayers as well. Today I am praying for the end of this great COVID crisis." The event featured musical performances from Gary Valenciano, Brooke Ligertwood from the Christian band Hillsong Worship, Lecrae, Heather Headley and Michael Neale. Other notable speakers included Ronnie Floyd, Ed Young, Mark Driscoll, and Samuel Rodriguez. Pray.com partnered with SiriusXM, DirecTV and Facebook to stream the event across multiple platforms. Pray.com was featured as a pop-up channel on SiriusXM, channel 154, to host the prayer event and celebrate people of all faith.

=== Personal data ===
In 2020, the app inadvertently exposed sensitive personal data of up to 10 million users as a result of unsecured cloud databases that were stored on Amazon Web Services. In 2022, an investigation from Buzzfeed accused the app of not properly disclosing that they sell private data from users to third-party data brokers for commercial purposes.

=== Censorship in China ===
In February 2024 the app was removed from Apple's App Store in China as part of the country's broader efforts to restrict access to religious content. The app was targeted due to China's stringent regulations on religious material, particularly content distributed through digital platforms. The removal aligns with China's ongoing campaign to control online religious expression and maintain state-approved religious activities.

=== AI content ===
Pray.com began using artificial intelligence to generate imagery in the 2020s. In 2025 they launched the AI Bible YouTube channel, with some videos having millions of views. The videos received mixed reviews from theology scholars with Brad East stating that they had a "Marvel aesthetic in all the worst ways" while Paul Hoffman stated he was "always a fan of anything that drives interest ... in the Bible".
