= Acxiom =

American database marketing company

Acxiom LLC
- Type: Division
- Industry: Database marketing
- Founded: Conway, Arkansas, U.S. (2018)
- Headquarters: Conway, Arkansas, U.S.
- Key people: John Watkins, COO
- Products: Audience Cloud; Global Data Navigator; InfoBase; Personicx; Unified Data Layer; Real Identity
- Number of employees: 2,100+ (2018)
- Website: acxiom.com

Acxiom LLC (pronounced "ax-ee-um") is a Conway, Arkansas-based database marketing company. The company collects, analyzes and sells customer and business information used for targeted advertising campaigns. The company was formed in 2018 when Acxiom Corporation (since renamed LiveRamp) spun off its Acxiom Marketing Services (AMS) division to global advertising network Interpublic Group of Companies.

In 2018, the Interpublic Group of Companies acquired the Acxiom Marketing Services division of Acxiom Corporation and renamed it Acxiom LLC, with the remaining portion of Acxiom Corporation becoming the publicly held company of LiveRamp.

The company has offices in the United States, Europe, and Asia.

== Foundation and early days ==
Acxiom was founded in 1969 as Demographics, Inc. by Charles D. Ward in Conway, Arkansas. The company was initially involved in producing mailing lists using phonebooks and payroll processing. In 1980, the company changed its name to Conway Communications Exchange, and in 1983 it incorporated as CCX Network, Inc. and made its first public offering. In 1988 it became Acxiom Corporation.

=== 1990s ===
In November 1997, Acxiom acquired Buckley Dement, a provider of healthcare fulfillment and professional medical lists. In May 1998, Acxiom made the announcement that it would acquire one of its competitors, May & Speh.

=== 2000s ===
In early 2004, Acxiom acquired part of Claritas, a European data provider. In 2005, Acxiom acquired Digital Impact for $140 million and integrated its digital and online services into its business.

In April 2007, Acxiom acquired Kefta, a real-time personalization company, and incorporated its clients and technology into its Digital Impact division. It acquired EchoTarget, a dynamic banner retargeting company, to expand its interactive marketing offerings.

On May 16, 2007, Acxiom Corporation agreed to a buyout by investment firms Silver Lake Partners and ValueAct Capital in an all-cash deal valued at $3 billion, including assuming about $756 million of debt. However, in October 2007, due to challenging credit market conditions, the companies decided to terminate the deal. Concurrently, Acxiom announced the retirement of Chairman Charles Morgan, pending the selection of his successor.

On January 17, 2008, Acxiom named John Meyer (from Alcatel-Lucent) as new CEO and president. On July 11, 2008, Acxiom acquired ChoicePoint's database marketing solutions division. Acxiom acquired Quinetix LLC, an analytics and predictive modeling firm in November. The terms of the deal were not disclosed.

=== 2010s ===
In 2010, Acxiom acquired part of GoDigital, a Brazilian direct marketing and data quality company. The company launched AbiliTec Digital, a web-based tool to match digital identities to traditional name and address data, such as those collected from loyalty programs.

On July 27, 2011, Acxiom named Scott E. Howe as the company's chief executive officer and president. Acxiom announced the sale of its background screening business, Acxiom Information Security Services (AISS), to Sterling Infosystems, now SterlingBackcheck.

In 2012, The New York Times reported that the company had the world's largest commercial database on consumers.

On May 14, 2014, Acxiom Corporation announced that it had acquired LiveRamp, a data onboarding company, for $310 million.

In July 2015, the company sold its IT outsourcing division, Acxiom IT Outsourcing (Acxiom ITO) for $190 million to Charlesbank Capital Partners and M/C Partners, and Acxiom ITO was subsequently rebranded as Ensono. Acxiom acquired the Boston-based advanced advertising unit of Allant, a third-party data shop focused on advertising and marketing.

In August 2016, Acxiom sold its marketing automation and email solution, Acxiom Impact, for $50 million to New York City-based marketing firm Zeta Interactive, now Zeta Global.

In January 2017, Acxiom Corporation launched Audience Cloud, an anonymous targeting tool that allowed demographic segmentation of customers without revealing their actual identities.

In May 2018, the company announced international expansion into Brazil, Netherlands, and Italy and released Global Data Navigator (GDN), a portal for identifying available data elements by country. In July, the Interpublic Group of Companies (IPG) announced the acquisition of Acxiom Corporation's Marketing Solutions (AMS) business for US$2.3 billion. The deal excluded the LiveRamp business. The sale of the Marketing Solutions business to IPG was completed in October. Following the sale, Acxiom Corporation officially changed its name to LiveRamp and its ticker symbol to RAMP, while the AMS business retained the Acxiom name under IPG ownership.

In September 2018, Acxiom introduced the Unified Data Layer, an open data framework designed to enable clients to integrate and manage both online and offline data sources.

=== 2020s ===
In March 2021, Acxiom partnered with the Forge Institute to enhance cybersecurity education and workforce development opportunities, focusing on underserved communities to help them acquire valuable workforce skills. Later in July 2023, the collaboration expanded as the Forge Institute announced Acxiom's sponsorship of its Forge Fellowship program, further solidifying their longstanding partnership.

In October 2021, Acxiom and Adobe announced the integration of Acxiom's Real Identity with the Adobe Experience Platform.

In June 2022, Acxiom launched Match Multiplier, an application that facilitates data sharing by allowing brands to increase the reach of their data with additional match keys natively in the Snowflake Data Cloud. In August, Acxiom was recognized in the top 50 of Fast Company's 2022 list of 100 Best Workplaces for Innovators.

In July 2023, Acxiom achieved a top score on the 2023 Disability Equality Index (DEI) and earned recognition as a Best Place to Work for Disability Inclusion. In October 2023, Acxiom won the Salesforce Partner Innovation Award in Transportation, Travel, and Hospitality for their work with Heathrow Airport. In the same month, IPG, Acxiom's parent company, announced the launch of an identity resolution cloud application aimed at integrating brands’ cloud ecosystems powered by Acxiom.

In January 2024, Acxiom introduced Acxiom Health as the latest development in its data-driven healthcare and pharmaceutical marketing practice. The new initiative has demonstrated a 25% increase in campaign conversions, positioning Acxiom Health favorably compared to competitors in head-to-head tests.

== Business ==
Acxiom provides anonymized customer data to marketers, allowing the delivery of more relevant ads to consumers, with more effective measurement.

Acxiom's client base in the United States consists primarily of companies in the financial, insurance and investment services, automotive, retail, telecommunications, healthcare, travel, entertainment, non-profit and government sectors.

== Products ==
- Audience Cloud identifies anonymous audience segments, and matches them with publications to display targeted ads when a member of the audience visits a particular site.
- Global Data Navigator service allows agencies to select global data elements by country.
- InfoBase is the company's brokered warehouse of consumer data.
- Personicx is a customer segmentation tool.
- Unified Data Layer (UDL) uses cloud architecture to help firms connect online and offline data, to better identify consumers' identities, with a goal of complying with GDPR privacy laws.

== Locations ==
Acxiom's headquarters is located in Conway, Arkansas, United States. The company has an additional U.S. office in New York, New York. International offices are located in the United Kingdom, Germany, Poland, and China.
