= Aram Khachaturian =

Soviet Armenian composer (1903–1978)

- Арам Хачатурян; Արամ Խաչատրյան
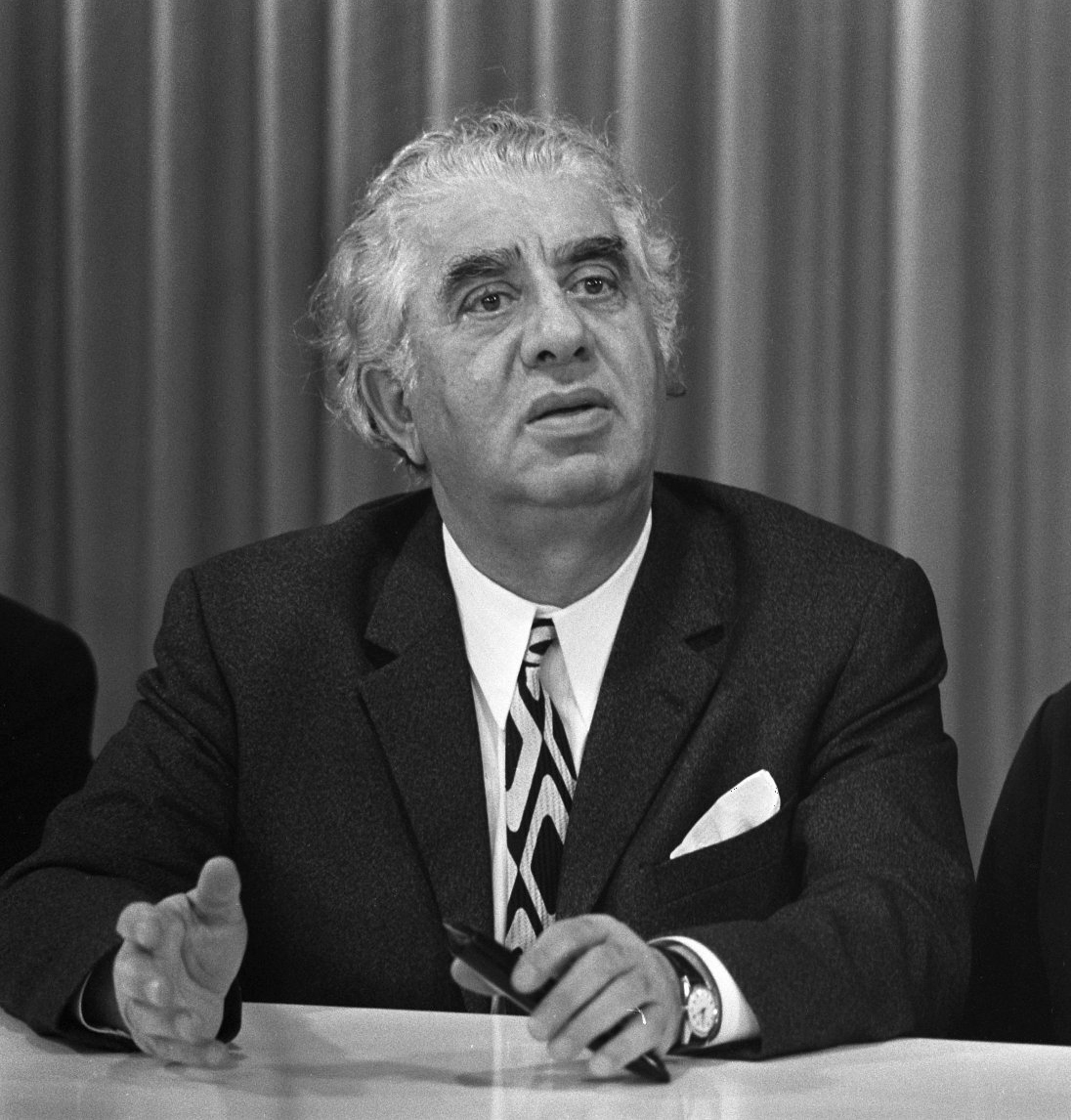
- Khachaturian in 1971
- Born: 6 June 1903; Tiflis or Kojori, Russian Empire
- Died: 1 May 1978 (aged 74); Moscow, Soviet Union
- Burial place: Komitas Pantheon, Yerevan, Armenia
- Education: Gnessin Musical Institute; Moscow Conservatory
- Years active: 1926–1978
- Works: List of compositions
- Political party: CPSU (from 1943)
- Spouse: Nina Makarova (m. 1933; died 1976)
- Children: 2
- Awards

Aram Ilyich Khachaturian (/ˈærəm ˌkɑːtʃəˈtʊəriən/; (Note: Russian: Арам Ильич Хачатурян; Russian pronunciation: [ɐˈram ɨˈlʲjitɕ xətɕɪtʊˈrʲan] Armenian: Արամ Խաչատրյան, Aram Xačatryan; IPA: [ɑˈɾɑm χɑtʃʰɑt(ə)ˈɾjɑn] Xačatryan is the standard transliteration of his last name. It is sometimes spelled Khachatryan by official Armenian sources.) 6 June [O.S. 24 May] 1903 – 1 May 1978) was a Soviet Armenian composer and conductor. He is considered one of the leading Soviet composers.

Born and raised in Tbilisi (now the capital of Georgia), he moved to Moscow in 1921 following the Sovietization of the Caucasus. Without prior music training, he enrolled in the Gnessin Musical Institute, and subsequently studied at the Moscow Conservatory in the class of Nikolai Myaskovsky, among others. His first major work, the Piano Concerto (1936), popularized his name within and outside the Soviet Union. It was followed by the Violin Concerto (1940) and the Cello Concerto (1946). His other significant compositions include the Masquerade Suite (1941), the Anthem of the Armenian SSR (1944), three symphonies (1935, 1943, 1947), and around 25 film scores. Khachaturian is best known for his ballet music: Gayane (1942) and Spartacus (1954). His most popular piece, the "Sabre Dance" from Gayane, has been used extensively in popular culture and has been performed by a number of musicians worldwide. His style is "characterized by colorful harmonies, captivating rhythms, virtuosity, improvisations, and sensuous melodies".

During most of his career, Khachaturian was approved by the Soviet government and held several high posts in the Union of Soviet Composers from the late 1930s, although he joined the Communist Party only in 1943. Along with Sergei Prokofiev and Dmitri Shostakovich, he was officially denounced as a "formalist" and his music dubbed "anti-people" in 1948 but was restored later that year. After 1950 he taught at the Gnessin Institute and the Moscow Conservatory and turned to conducting. He traveled to Europe, Latin America, and the United States with concerts of his own works. In 1957 Khachaturian became the Secretary of the Union of Soviet Composers, a position he held until his death.

Khachaturian composed the first Armenian ballet music, symphony, concerto, and film score. (Note: "Նա ազգային առաջին բալետի, սիմֆոնիայի, գործիքային կոնցերտների հեղինակն է, հայկ. կինոերաժշտության հիմնադիրը:" He is the author of the first national ballet, symphony, concerto, first Arm. film score. "В 1939 году Арам Хачатурян сочинил музыку к первому армянскому балету «Счастье»." In 1939 Aram Khachaturian wrote the music to the first Armenian ballet Happiness.) He is considered the most renowned Armenian composer of the 20th century. While following the established musical traditions of Russia, he broadly incorporated Armenian and, to a lesser extent, Caucasian, Eastern and Central European, and Middle Eastern peoples' folk music into his works. He is highly regarded in Armenia, where he is considered a "national treasure".

== Biography ==
=== Background and early life (1903–1921) ===
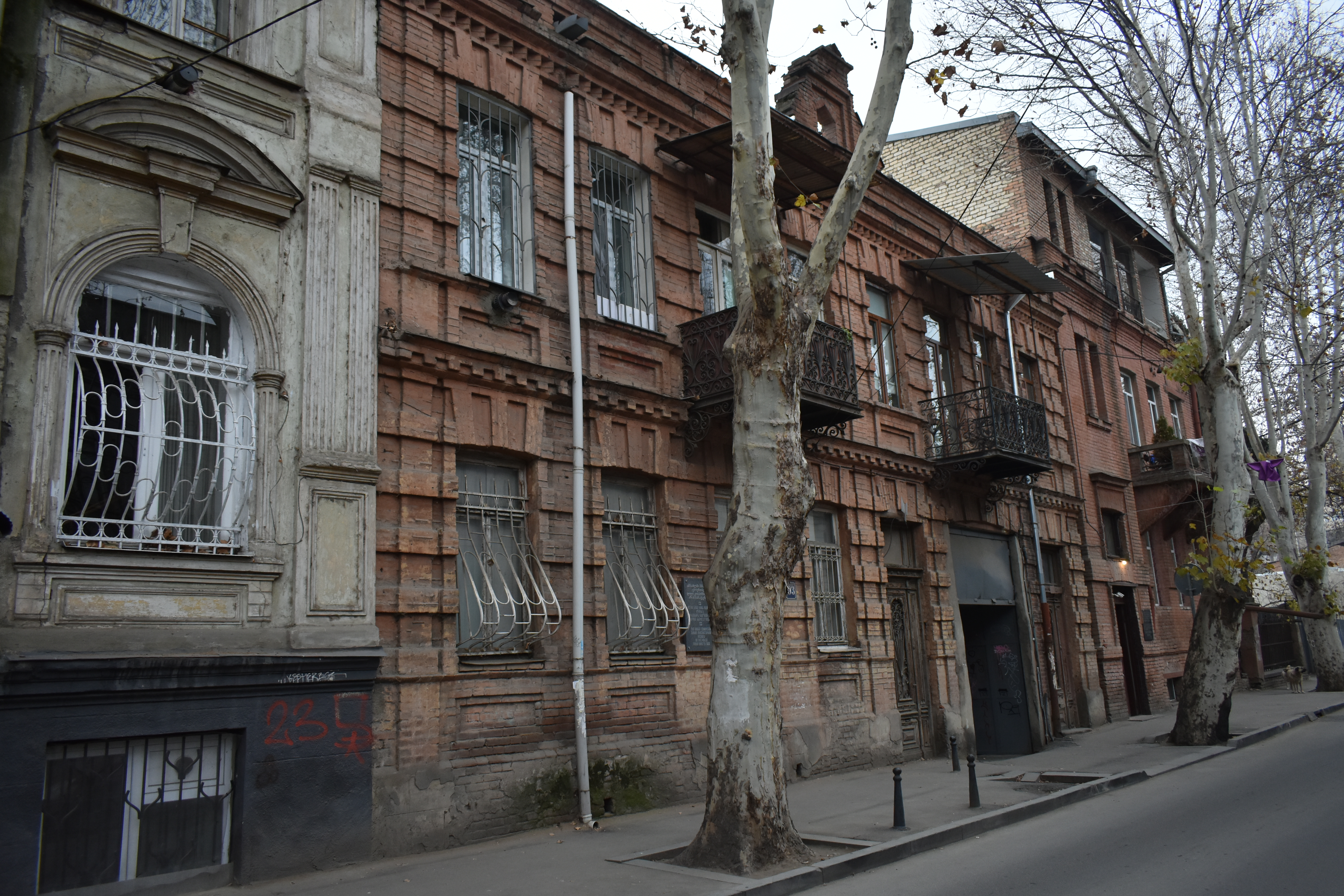
The building at 93 Uznadze Street in Tbilisi, where Khachaturian lived between 1906 and 1922

Aram Khachaturian was born on 6 June (24 May in Old Style) 1903 in the city of Tiflis (present-day Tbilisi, Georgia) into an Armenian family. Some sources indicate Kojori, a village near Tiflis, as his birthplace. Khachaturian himself said he was born in Kojori. (Note: At 5:15: "Это селение Коджори, под Тбилиси, км 20. Я в Коджорах родился.") His father, Yeghia (Ilya), was born in the village of Upper Aza near Ordubad in Nakhichevan (present-day Nakhchivan Autonomous Republic, Azerbaijan) and moved to Tiflis at the age of 13; he owned a bookbinding shop by the age of 25. His mother, Kumash Sarkisovna, was from Lower Aza, also a village near Ordubad. Khachaturian's parents were betrothed before knowing each other, when Kumash was 9 and Yeghia was 19. They had five children, one daughter and four sons, of whom Aram was the youngest. From 1906 to 1922, Khachaturian lived at 93 Uznadze Street in Tbilisi. (Note: A commemorative plaque in Georgian only was placed in 1999. It was replaced with a trilingual one (Georgian, Armenian, English) in 2023.) Khachaturian received primary education at the commercial school of Tiflis, a school for merchants. He considered a career either in medicine or engineering.

In the 19th and early 20th centuries and throughout the early Soviet period, Tiflis (known as Tbilisi after 1936) was the largest city and the administrative center of the Caucasus. In Tiflis, which has historically been multicultural, Khachaturian was exposed to various cultures. The city had a large Armenian population and was a major Armenian cultural center until the Russian Revolution and the following years. In a 1952 article "My Idea of the Folk Element in Music", Khachaturian described the city environment and its influence on his career:

I grew up in an atmosphere rich in folk music: popular festivities, rites, joyous and sad events in the life of the people always accompanied by music, the vivid tunes of Armenian, Azerbaijani and Georgian songs and dances performed by folk bards [ashugs] and musicians — such were the impressions that became deeply engraved on my memory, that determined my musical thinking. They shaped my musical consciousness and lay at the foundations of my artistic personality... Whatever the changes and improvements that took place in my musical taste in later years, their original substance, formed in early childhood in close communion with the people, has always remained the natural soil nourishing all my work.

In 1917, the Bolsheviks rose to power in Russia in the October Revolution. After over two years of fragile independence, Armenia fell to Soviet rule in late 1920. Georgia was also Sovietized by the spring of 1921. Both countries formally became part of the Soviet Union in December 1922.

=== Education (1922–1936) ===
In 1921, the eighteen-year-old Khachaturian moved to Moscow to join his oldest brother, Suren, who had settled in Moscow earlier and was a stage director at the Moscow Art Theatre by the time of his arrival. He enrolled at the Gnessin Musical Institute in 1922, simultaneously studying biology at Moscow State University. He initially studied the cello under Sergei Bychkov and later under Andrey Borysyak. In 1925, Mikhail Gnessin started a composition class at the institute, which Khachaturian joined. In this period, he wrote his first works: the Dance Suite for violin and piano (1926) and the Poem in C Sharp Minor (1927). Beginning with his earliest works, Khachaturian extensively used Armenian folk music in his compositions.

In 1929, Khachaturian entered the Moscow Conservatory to study composition under Nikolai Myaskovsky and orchestration under Sergei Vasilenko. He finished the conservatory in 1934 and went on to complete his graduate work in 1936.

=== Early career (1936–1948) ===
His Armenian-influenced First Symphony, which Khachaturian composed as a graduation work from the Moscow Conservatory in 1935, "drew the attention of prominent conductors and was soon performed by the best Soviet orchestras" and was admired by Shostakovich. He began an active creative career upon completing his graduate studies at the conservatory in 1936. He wrote his first major work, the Piano Concerto, that year. It proved to be a success, establishing him as a respected composer in the Soviet Union. It was "played and acclaimed far beyond the borders of the Soviet Union", and "established his name abroad".

His Piano Concerto, along with the two later concertos—the Violin Concerto (1940), for which he won a Stalin Prize, second class and the Cello Concerto (1946)—are "often considered a kind of a grand cycle". The Violin Concerto "gained international recognition" and became part of the international repertory. It was first performed by David Oistrakh.

Khachaturian held important posts at the Composers' Union, becoming deputy chairman of the Moscow branch in 1937. He subsequently served as the Deputy Chairman of the Organizing Committee (Orgkom) of the Union between 1939 and 1948. He joined the Communist Party in 1943. "Throughout the early and mid-1940s, Khachaturian used that position to help shape Soviet music, always stressing technically masterful composition. In fact, in his memoirs, he reported pride about leading an institution that organized creative work in many musical genres and especially in all Soviet republics."

The years preceding and following World War II were very productive for Khachaturian. In 1939 he made a six-month trip to his native Armenia "to make a thorough study of Armenian musical folklore and to collect folk-song and dance tunes" for his first ballet, Happiness. He developed the latter at the suggestion of Anastas Mikoyan, based on a libretto by Gevorg Hovhannisyan. As one author noted, Khachaturian's "communion with Armenia's national culture and musical practice proved for him, as he put it himself, 'a second conservatoire'. He learned a lot, saw and heard many things anew, and at the same time he had an insight into the tastes and artistic requirements of the Armenian people." In 1942, at the height of the Second World War, Khachaturian reworked Happiness into the ballet Gayane. It was first performed by the Kirov Ballet (today the Mariinsky Ballet) in Perm, while Leningrad was under siege. It was a great success and earned the composer his second Stalin Prize, this time first-class. Khachaturian returned the prize money to the state with a request to use it for building a tank for the Red Army.

He composed the Second Symphony (1943) on the occasion of the 25th anniversary of the October Revolution and incidental music to Masquerade (1944), "a symphonic suite in the tradition of lavish classical Russian music", on Mikhail Lermontov's play of the same title. Both the ballet Gayane and the Second Symphony were "successful and were warmly praised by Shostakovich". In 1944, Khachaturian composed the largely symbolic Anthem of the Armenian Soviet Socialist Republic.

=== Denunciation and Restoration (1948) ===
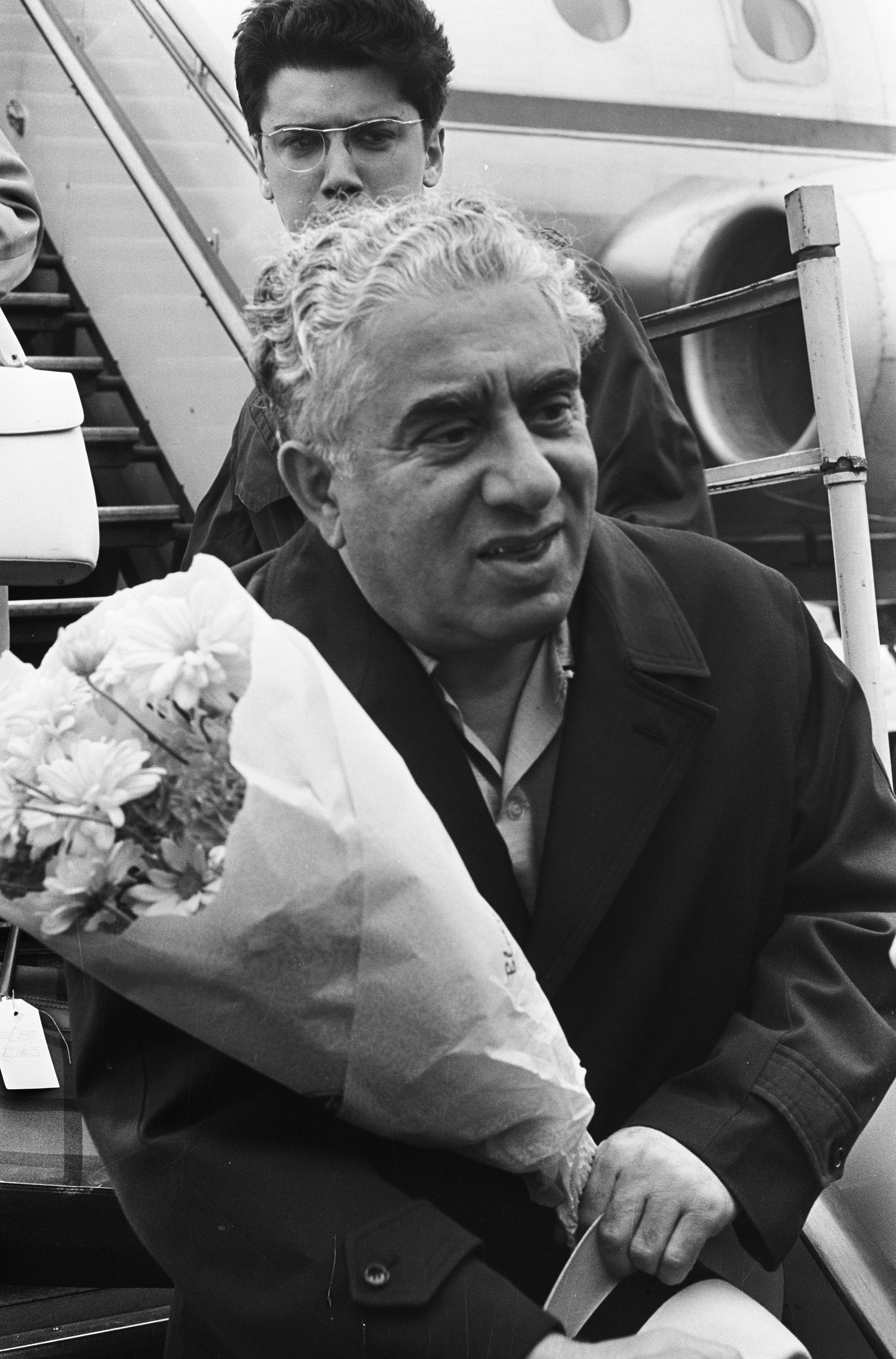
Khachaturian in 1964

In mid-December 1947, the Department for Agitation and Propaganda (better known as Agitprop) submitted to Andrei Zhdanov, the secretary of the Communist Party's Central Committee, a document on the "shortcomings" in the development of Soviet music. On 10–13 January 1948, a conference was held at the Kremlin in the presence of seventy musicians, composers, conductors and others who were confronted by Zhdanov:

We will consider that if these comrades Shostakovich, Prokofiev, Myaskovsky, Khachaturian, Kabalevsky and Shebalin namely who are the principal and leading figures of the formalist direction in music. And that direction is fundamentally incorrect.

During the course of the conference, the newly appointed head of the Union of Soviet Composers, Tikhon Khrennikov complained that Khachaturian's Symphonic Poem had its premier in a half empty hall and that "everyone thought that Khachaturian's Cello Concerto was rubbish". In response, Khachaturian – who admitted that speaking at such an event made him nervous – conceded that composers of more complex work might be guilty of ignoring popular taste, thinking that it would catch up with them in time. Zhdanov interrupted to say that such an attitude was "extreme individualism". Khachaturian and other leading composers were denounced by the Communist Party as followers of the alleged formalism (i.e. "[a type of] music that was considered too advanced or difficult for the masses to enjoy") and their music was dubbed "anti-people". It was the Symphonic Poem (1947), later titled the Third Symphony, that officially earned Khachaturian the wrath of the Party. Ironically, he wrote the work as a tribute to the 30th anniversary of the October Revolution. He stated: "I wanted to write the kind of composition in which the public would feel my unwritten program without an announcement. I wanted this work to express the Soviet people's joy and pride in their great and mighty country."

Musicologist Blair Johnston believes that his "music contained few, if any, of the objectionable traits found in the music of some of his more adventuresome colleagues. In retrospect, it was most likely Khachaturian's administrative role in the Union [of Soviet Composers], perceived by the government as a bastion of politically incorrect music, and not his music as such, that earned him a place on the blacklist of 1948." In March 1948, Khachaturian "made a very full and humble apology for his artistic 'errors' following the Zhdanov decree; his musical style, however, underwent no changes". He was sent to Armenia as a "punishment", and continued to be censured. Edward Rothstein argued that Khachaturian suffered less than Shostakovich and Prokofiev, "perhaps because of his folkloric and simple musical style."

By December 1948 (Zhdanov had died in August), he was restored to favor, receiving praise for his score for the film Vladimir Ilyich Lenin, a film biography of the Soviet leader.

=== Later life (1950–1978) ===
In 1950, Khachaturian began conducting and started teaching composition at his alma maters—the Gnessin Institute (since 1950), and later at the Moscow Conservatory (since 1951). During his career as a university professor, Khachaturian emphasized the role of folk music to his students and instilled the idea that composers should master their nations' folk music heritage.

In 1950, he began working on his third and last ballet, Spartacus (1950–54), which later proved to be his last internationally acclaimed work. He revised Spartacus in 1968. He was named People's Artist of the Soviet Union in 1954. Under Georgy Malenkov's brief rule, in 1954, Khachaturian became a mouthpiece, along with Ilya Ehrenburg, to "assure Soviet intellectuals that the ideological controls imposed by the draconic Zhdanov decrees of 1946–48 would be at least temporarily lifted."

After completing Spartacus, since the late 1950s, Khachaturian focused less on composition, and more on conducting, teaching, bureaucracy and travel. He served as the President of the Soviet Association of Friendship and Cultural Cooperation with Latin American States from 1958 and was a member of the Soviet Peace Committee (since 1962). "He frequently appeared in world forums in the role of champion of an apologist for the Soviet idea of creative orthodoxy." Khachaturian toured with concerts of his own works in around 30 countries, including in all the Eastern Bloc states, Italy (1950), Britain (1955, 1977), Latin America (1957) and the United States (1960, 1968). His January 1968 visit to U.S. capital of Washington, D.C. was a significant one. He conducted the National Symphony Orchestra in a program of his own works. In a six-week tour he visited seven American cities.

Khachaturian went on to serve again as Secretary of the Composers Union, starting in 1957 until his death. He was also a deputy in the fifth Supreme Soviet of the Soviet Union (1958–62). In the last two decades of his life, Khachaturian wrote three concert rhapsodies—for violin (1961–62), cello (1963) and piano (1965)—and solo sonatas for unaccompanied cello, violin, and viola (1970s), which are considered to be his second and third instrumental trilogies.

== Music ==
"Sabre Dance"
14-second sample

Khachaturian's works span a broad range of musical types, including ballets, symphonies, concertos, and film scores. Music critic Edward Greenfield expresses the opinion that Khachaturian "notably outshone other Soviet contemporaries in creating a sharply identifiable style, something which his successors have found impossible to emulate". He composed a great portion of his works in a ten-year span between 1936 and 1946, preceding and following the Second World War. Despite his formal restoration after the 1948 denunciation, Khachaturian only succeeded in composing one internationally acclaimed work in the last 30 years of his life, the ballet Spartacus.

According to James Bakst, what made Khachaturian unique among Soviet composers is "the blending of national Armenian vocal and instrumental intonations with contemporary orchestral techniques". Khachaturian's music is characterized by an active rhythmic development, which reaches either a mere repetition of the basic formula (ostinato) or "a game of emphasis within this formula".

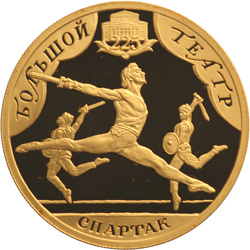
The Central Bank of Russia issued a commemorative coin depicting Spartacus in 2001.

=== Works ===
==== Ballet ====
Khachaturian is best known internationally for his ballet music. (Note: "Khachaturian's world renown ... was due to his two Romantic ballets Gayaneh and Spartacus, and his attractively melodious concertos." "Khachaturian is principally known for his ballet music..." "...it is for his ballet music that he was and remains best known both in the Soviet Union and in the West". "...his fame in the West rests chiefly on two ballets, Gayane (1942) and Spartacus (1954)...) His second ballet, Gayane, was largely reworked from his first ballet, Happiness. Anna Kisselgoff called it "one of the staples of the Soviet and Eastern European ballet repertory." Spartacus became his most acclaimed work in the post-Stalin period. These two compositions "remain his most successful compositions". According to Jonathan McCollum and Andy Nercessian, his music for these two ballets "can safely be included among the best known pieces of classical music throughout the world, a fact that is vitalized by the perception that these are perhaps the only works through which the world really knows Armenian music".

Spartacus was popularized when the "Adagio of Spartacus and Phrygia" was used as the theme for a popular BBC drama series The Onedin Line during the 1970s. The climax of Spartacus was also used in films such as Caligula (1979) and Ice Age: The Meltdown (2006). Joel Coen's The Hudsucker Proxy (1994) also prominently featured music from Spartacus and Gayane (the "Sabre Dance" included). Gayane's "Adagio" was used, among other films, in Stanley Kubrick's futuristic film 2001: A Space Odyssey.

==== Orchestral music ====
Khachaturian wrote three symphonies: the First in 1934/5, the Second in 1943, and the Third in 1947. He also wrote three concertos: the Piano Concerto (1936), the Violin Concerto (1940), and the Cello Concerto (1946).

==== Other compositions ====
Khachaturian wrote incidental music for several plays, including Macbeth (1934, 1955), The Widow from Valencia (1940), Masquerade (1941), King Lear (1958).

Khachaturian was the first Soviet composer to write music for sound films. He produced around 25 film scores. Among them is Pepo (1935), the first Armenian sound film. In 1950 he was awarded the Stalin prize for the score of The Battle of Stalingrad (1949).

=== Influences ===
I do not see how modern composers could isolate themselves from life and not want to work among society. The more impressions that come from contact with life, the more and better the creative ideas.

— Khachaturian

Musicologist Marina Frolova-Walker describes Khachaturian as the only internationally renowned Soviet composer "who emerged from the nationalist project". James Bakst interpreted Khachaturian's views as follows: "Music is a language created by the people. The people create intonational music forms that reveal at once his national elements of an artwork."

Composer Tigran Mansurian suggested that Khachaturian's music incorporates American characteristics and called the United States his "second homeland" in terms of musical influences, especially due to the sense of optimism in his works and lifestyle. Soviet musicologist Boris Yarustovsky argued that the influence from American culture was heard in some of the words of Khachaturian.

==== Armenian folk music ====
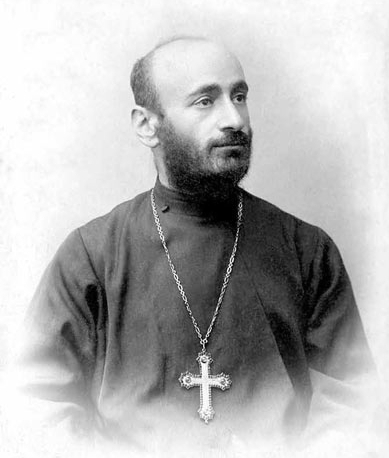
Khachaturian used the "raw material" made available by Komitas (pictured), who in the early 20th century collected thousands of pieces of Armenian folk music.

Khachaturian is widely known for his use of folk songs of various ethnic groups in his compositions, most notably those of Armenians. (Note: "Khachaturian's characteristic musical style draws on the melodic and rhythmic vitality of Armenian folk music." "...Armenian folk [music] ... can be heard in nearly all Khachaturian's works." "In these Khachaturian displays a characteristic vitality of rhythm, a penchant for rich orchestration and an effulgent melodic style, frequently owing much to the inflections of the folk music of his native Armenia." "The exotic lyrical patterns and improvisatory characteristics of Khachaturyan's music are the result of national Armenian intonations." "The influence of Armenian folk music can be seen in the frequent hectic ostinatos, in chords based on fourths and fifths (inspired by the open strings of the Armenian saz), and a rhapsodic improvisational form of melody.") Rosenberg argued that despite not having been born in Armenia, Khachaturian was "essentially an Armenian composer whose music exhibits his Armenian roots". "[M]any of his compositions evoke an Armenian melodic line. However, his works markedly differed from the conventional orchestrations of folk themes", writes Rouben Paul Adalian. He suggests that Khachaturian's works carry "the vibrant rhythms and stirring pace of Caucasian dance music", but at the same time are "original compositions that reworked that cultural material through new instrumentation and according to European musical canons, resulting in a sound unique to the composer". Richard Taruskin argued that "Khachaturian's 'Armenian' style was largely adapted from Gnesin's all-purpose Orientalist idiom."

Khachaturian was particularly influenced by the folk-song collector, musicologist Komitas, and composers Alexander Spendiaryan and Romanos Melikian. (Note: "Նրա արվեստը սերտորեն առնչվում է Կոմիտասի, Ա. Սպենիարյանի, Ռ. Մելիքյանի ստեղծագործություններին, հատկապես հայ ժող. երաժշտությանը:" "... he repeatedly acknowledged his Armenian predecessors (Komitas, for instance), he evolved his musical language from ethnic models, and he took as his creed the words of the Armenian pioneer Spendarian, who advised him to "study the music of your own people and drink in the sound of life".) Khachaturian acknowledged that Komitas "singlehandedly laid the foundations for Armenia's classical tradition". In a 1969 article about Komitas, Khachaturian called him his "greatest teacher".

His plans to write an opera "on the destiny of the Armenian people, the tragic fate of Armenians scattered all over the world, their suffering and the struggle" never realized, and his "Armenian Rhapsody for mouth-organ and orchestra, intended for his close friend Larry Adler and the Chicago Symphony Orchestra" remained uncompleted. "Yet the intention, the spirit, was always there." Khachaturian emphasized his Armenian origin, stating:

No matter how I may waver between various musical languages, I remain an Armenian, but a European Armenian, not an Asian Armenian. Together with other [Armenian composers], we will make all of Europe and the whole world listen to our music. And when they hear our music, people are certain to say, 'Tell us about that people, and show us the country that produces such art.'

==== Other folk music ====
During his university years, Khachaturian transcribed Armenian, Russian, Hungarian, Turkish and other folk songs. In his mature works, Khachaturian used elements from folk songs of Caucasian (including, but not limited to Georgians), Eastern European (Ukrainians, Poles) and Middle Eastern (Turks, Kurds) peoples. (Note: "...music which not only makes use of the folklore of Armenia, but also draws upon the national characteristics of Georgia, the Ukraine, Turkey, etc.") His first ballet, Happiness, incorporates a Ukrainian gopak, Georgian, Armenian and Russian dances and a Lezginka, an energetic dance of many Caucasian peoples. The Masquerade Suite includes a Mazurka, a Polish folk dance music. The ballet Gayane, like its predecessor, features a Lezginka. Act II of Gayane "is filled with Kurdish dances".

==== Russian classical music ====
Khachaturian is cited by musicologists as a follower of Russian classical traditions. (Note: "At the same time, Khachaturyan is closely associated with Russian music as an outstanding school of artistic craftsmanship, and with its humane lyricism." "Khachaturian's own musical style reflected his background. He was highly skilled and well trained in the Russian classical tradition, and he frequently utilize the rich folk music traditions of the Caucasus in his original compositions, especially the ballet." "Khachaturian became a manifestation of one of the cornerstones of Soviet arts policy – the combination of the folk heritage of the various Socialist Republics with Russia's artistic traditions, embodied in music by composers such as Tchaikovsky and Rimsky-Korsakov.") According to the Toronto Symphony Orchestra, he "carried forward into the twentieth century the colorful, folk-inspired style of such nineteenth-century Russian composers as Rimsky-Korsakov and Tchaikovsky". Like the members of The Five, especially Alexander Borodin and Rimsky-Korsakov, whose works to some extent served him as a model, Khachaturian drew heavily upon "Eastern" and "Oriental" material in creating compositions in various classical genres and styles of European origin. But Khachaturian's cultural identity and rigorous musical training within the Soviet establishment allowed him to penetrate more deeply to the essence of Eastern and Caucasian music and to incorporate it more fully in his mature work, including the ballets. "Never dissociating himself from the traditions of Russian music, he came to be regarded in Moscow as a mouthpiece of the entire Soviet Orient, gathering up all the diverse traditions into a grand generalization", concludes Marina Frolova-Walker.

== Khachaturian's influence ==
Khachaturian's notable students at the Gnessin Institute and the Moscow Conservatory included foreign composers, such as Aziz El-Shawan from Egypt, Modesta Bor from Venezuela, Jorge López Marín and Enrique Ubieta from Cuba, Stefan Remenkov from Bulgaria, and Anatol Vieru from Romania, and a number of Soviet composers: Tolib Shakhidi, Georgs Pelēcis, Mark Minkov, Alexey Rybnikov, Andrei Eshpai, Albert Markov, Nodar Gabunia, Edgar Hovhannisyan, Mikael Tariverdiev, Eduard Khagagortyan. Critic Levon Hakobian described Khachaturian as a "conservative and self-absorbed teacher".

He inspired young Armenian composers and had a great influence on the development of Armenian music. Khachaturian's influence can be traced on chamber and symphonic music traditions of Armenia, including on the works of Arno Babajanian, Edvard Mirzoyan, and Konstantin Orbelyan, among others. Early compositions of Loris Tjeknavorian evoke the work of Khachaturian.

Khachaturian also influenced composers of Azerbaijan (such as Kara Karayev) and Central Asia. Critic Louis Biancolli noted in 1947 that Uzbekistan and Tajikistan have "borrowed" Khachaturian "on occasion for special research in national music."

Khachaturian was a close friend of the Bulgarian composer of Pancho Vladigerov and Khachaturian admired his music. Vladigerov's third piano concerto (1937), his most popular work, shows the influence of Khachaturian and Rachmaninoff. Eckhardt van den Hoogen called Vladigerov a sort of missing link between George Gershwin and Khachaturian.

=== East Asia ===
Harold C. Schonberg argued that Soviet-trained Chinese composers, such as Li Delun, were part of a "school of music strongly indebted" to socialist-realist composers like Khachaturian. He suggested that they "came back full of the approved Soviet ideology of Socialist Realism and, much worse, full of the technique of such composers as Khachaturian." Schonberg wrote that the Chinese ballet Red Detachment of Women (1964) incorporates elements of Russian academism and Oriental exoticism, resulting in a sound that is reminiscent of socialist-realist ballets like Khachaturian's Spartacus. Schonberg further suggested that Yellow River Piano Concerto (1970), created by Yin Chengzong and others under the guidance of Mao's wife Jiang Qing, is a "rehash of Rachmaninoff, Khachaturian, late Romanticism, bastardized Chinese music and Warner Bros climaxes." Chunya Chang suggested that it "carries many connections" with the works of Khachaturian, including "imitations of national instruments and applications of folk music." The most popular piano concerto in China, it "helped introduce Western-style orchestral music to millions of Chinese".

The music of the Japanese composer Roh Ogura had the influence of Khachaturian in "its rhythms and scoring." So did the works of Yasushi Akutagawa. Donald Richie and Joseph Anderson noted in 1982 that composers of scores of "independently" produced Japanese films are "ordered to turn out music" that "strongly echo" Khachaturian and other Soviet composers.

== Personal life and personality ==
In a 1957 letter, Khachaturian hinted at his feelings on balancing music and heritage: "Bury me in Yerevan," he wrote, "but bring the orchestra from Moscow."

Khachaturian was described as a "stocky bushy haired Armenian." In 1968 New York Post music critic Harriett Johnson characterized him as "sturdy, stocky and youthful." Dmitri Shostakovich described his outlook as "a basically optimistic, life-asserting view of our reality." In Testimony, attributed by Solomon Volkov to Shostakovich, the author wrote: "Meeting Khachaturian means, first of all, eating a good, filling meal, drinking with pleasure, and chatting about this and that. That's why, if I have the time, I never turn down a meeting with him." The German conductor Kurt Masur, who met him several times, said Khachaturian was "sometimes an uncomfortable person."

He played tennis and watched football in the stadium, was an "avid theater-goer". He maintained a lifelong interest in cinema.

=== Family ===
Khachaturian married twice. He had a daughter, Nune, from his first marriage with Ramel. Nune was a pianist.

Khachaturian married the composer Nina Makarova, a fellow student from Myaskovsky's class at the Moscow Conservatory, in 1933. Charlotte Curtis described her as "a bulky Russian woman with naturally pink cheeks, black hair" who is "widely known as one of the Soviet Union's most popular women composers." Makarova said of their differences: "He is Armenian — temperamental, strong and a bit Oriental. I am Russian and lyric." They had a son, Karen, who was an art critic. His nephew, Karen Khachaturian, was also a composer.

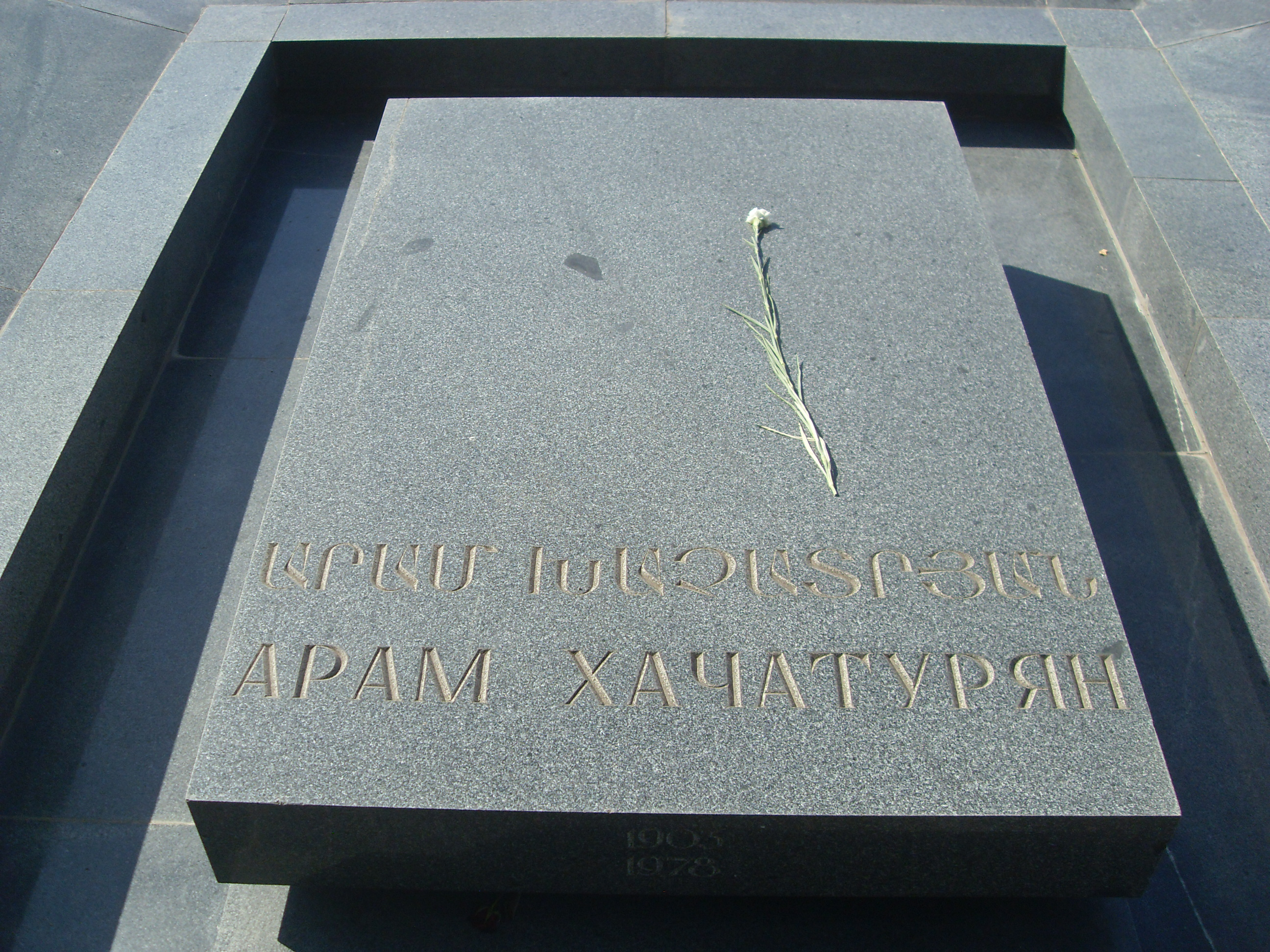
Khachaturian's tombstone at the Komitas Pantheon in Yerevan

=== Health and death ===
In early October 1965, Khachaturian was briefly admitted into a hospital in Geneva after a heart attack. He died in Moscow on 1 May 1978, after a long illness, just short of his 75th birthday. He was buried at the Komitas Pantheon in Yerevan on 6 May, next to other distinguished Armenians.

=== Views ===
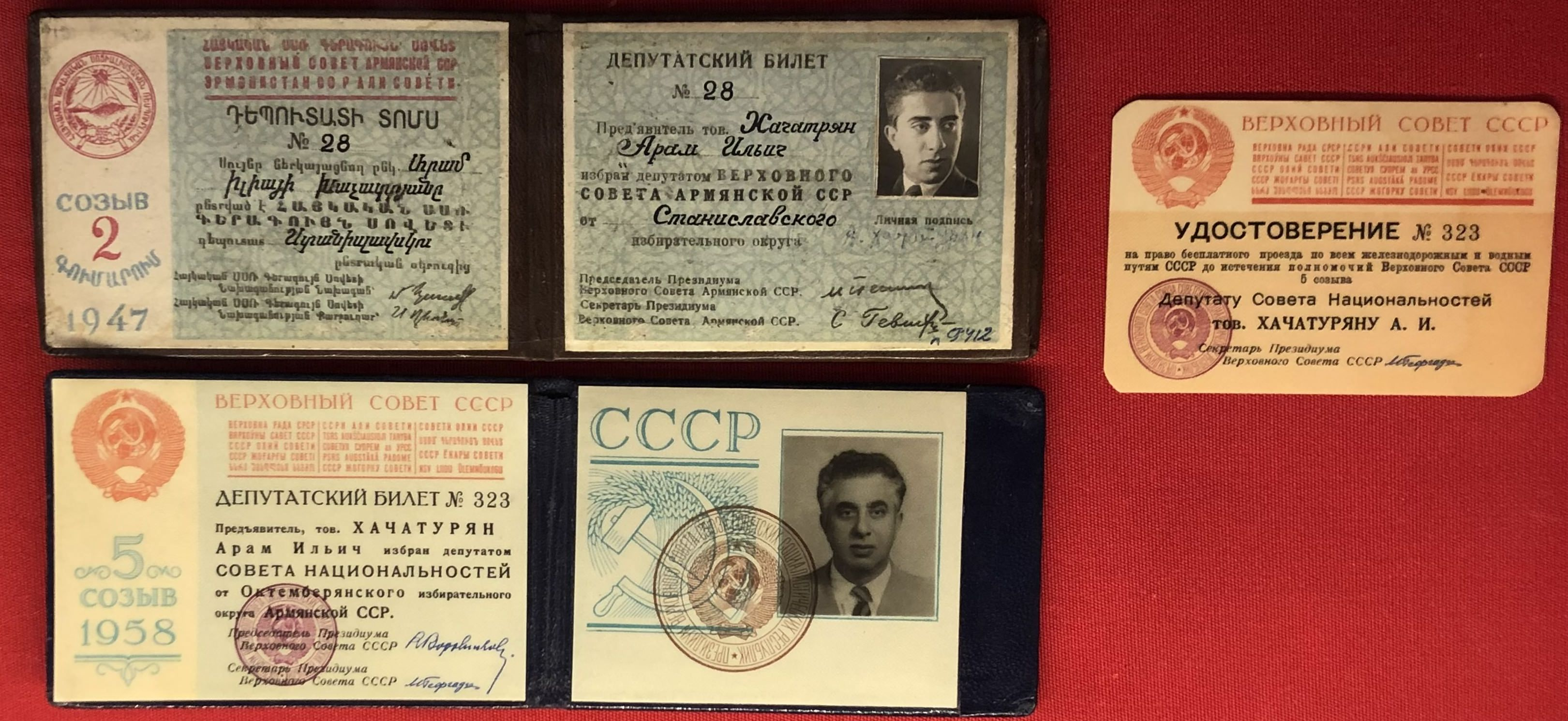
Aram Khachaturian's credentials for the Supreme Soviet on display at the House-Museum of Aram Khachaturian.

Khachaturian was reportedly an atheist (Note: When asked about his visit to the Vatican, Khachaturian has been quoted by Solomon Volkov as having said: "I'm an atheist, but I'm a son of the [Armenian] people who were the first to officially adopt Christianity and thus visiting the Vatican was my duty.") and remained enthusiastic about communism. Jeffrey Adams argues that he was a "loyal Communist ideologue" who was "devoted to making art relevant to the common worker." Khachaturian wrote: "the October Revolution fundamentally changed my whole life and, if I have really grown into a serious artist, then I am indebted only to the people and the Soviet Government."

Khachaturian denied any censorship of his music in the Soviet Union and when asked about 1948 purges, he said: "Well, they thought my music was too loud, I did write for 15 trumpets and even Stokowski decided against our doing that music when he found out the instrumentation. But I wouldn't change it. The composer must stick to his conception."

In January 1971, Khachaturian, along with Shostakovich, Igor Moiseyev, Maya Plisetskaya called on President Richard Nixon to free Angela Davis. In 1973 he joined eleven Soviet composers in condemning the nuclear physicist and dissident Andrei Sakharov after he met with Western correspondents.

== Recognition and reputation ==
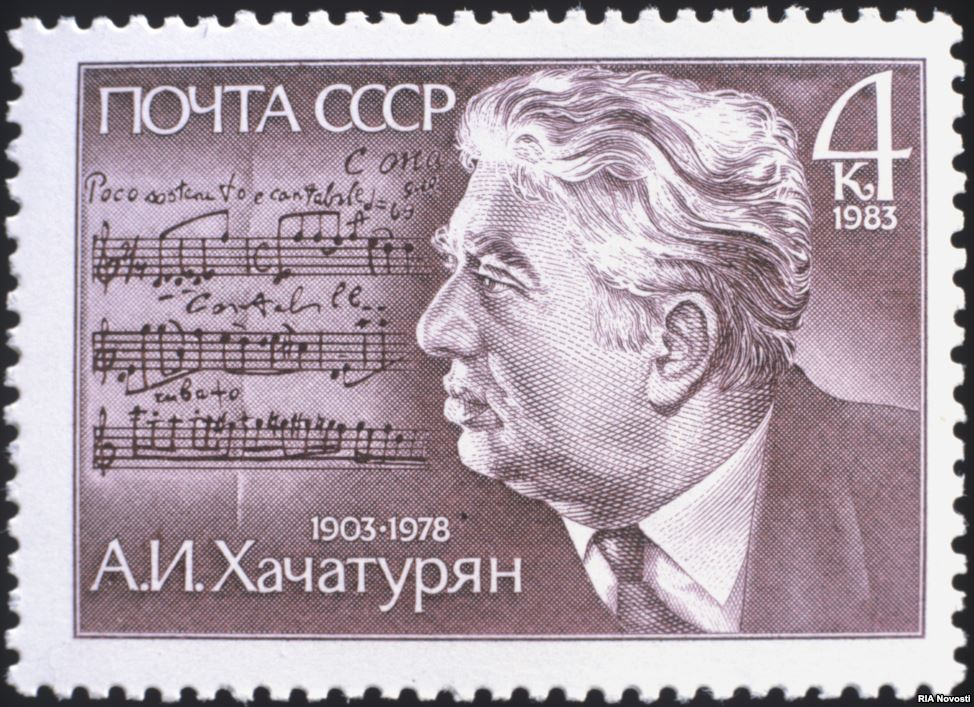
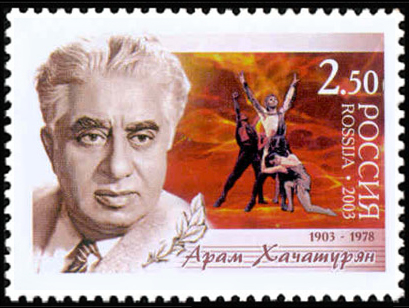
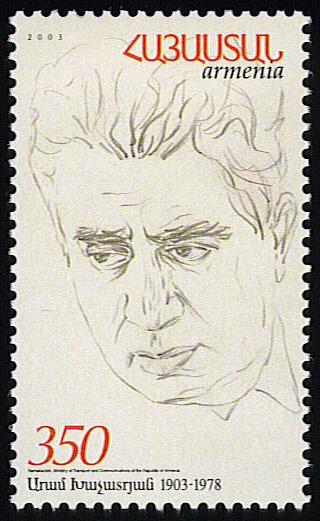
From left to right: Khachaturian depicted on Soviet (1983), Russian (2003) and Armenian (2003) postage stamps

Khachaturian is generally considered one of the leading composers of the Soviet Union. Alongside Dmitri Shostakovich and Sergei Prokofiev, he has been generally cited as one of the three greatest composers of the Soviet era. Ronald Crichton wrote on his death that, in his lifetime, Khachaturian "ranked as the third most celebrated Soviet composer after Shostakovich and Prokofiev."

According to the Los Angeles Philharmonic, "his works do not enjoy the international reputation that those of" Shostakovich and Prokofiev do. With these two and Dmitry Kabalevsky, Khachaturian "was one of the few Soviet composers to have become known to the wider international public". According to music historian Harlow Robinson, "his proletariat origins, non-Russian ethnic origins and Soviet training [made him] a powerful symbol within the Soviet musical establishment of the ideal of a multinational Soviet cultural identity, an identity which the composer enthusiastically embraced and exploited both at home and abroad". Unlike Prokofiev and Shostakovich, Khachaturian was "entirely a creation of the Soviet musical and dance establishment".

=== Reputation ===
The Age wrote that he was the "last survivor among such household names as Prokofiev, Shostakovich and Rachmaninov" and his death marked the "end of an era of the great Soviet composers." At the same time, his obituary argued that "on the whole Khachaturian was a writer of popular classics rather than intellectual music." Gramophone critic Ivan March noted in 1985 that Khachaturian's "reputation has sagged". He approved of the Violin Concerto and Gayane, but opined that "much of his music is disappointing." Richard Taruskin argued in 1996 that Khachaturian has not been "certified as [a] great artist by the promoters of classical music." Taruskin opined in 2003 that during his lifetime Khachaturian was "more popular than Shostakovich and rivaled only by Prokofiev — but these days it's different." He argued that musicians never "thought much of Khachaturian" as he was "always a composer for the crowds."

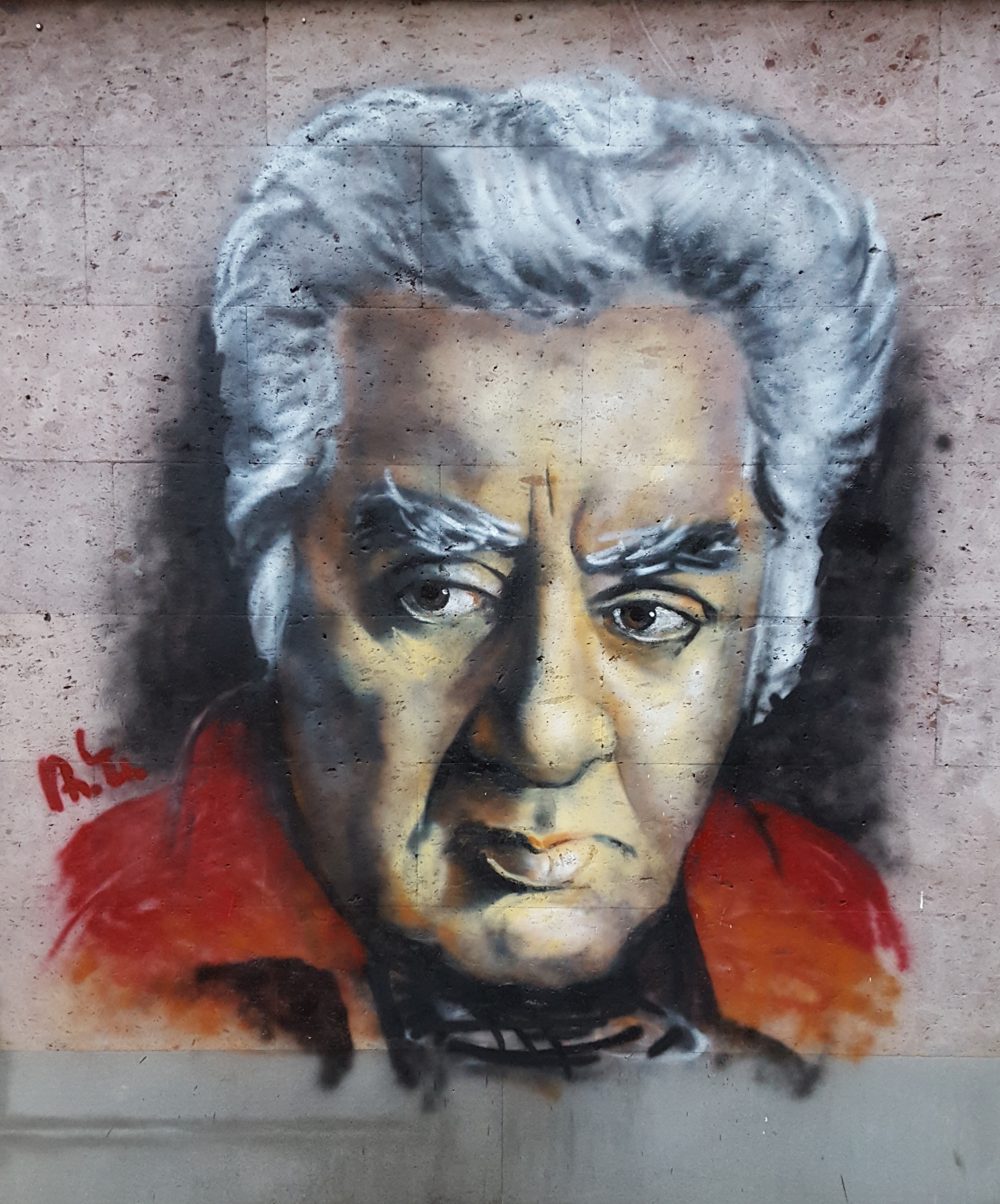
A mural of Khachaturian painted by Robert Nikoghosyan near the Yerevan Vernissage in July 2015

Josef Woodard, writing for the Los Angeles Times, suggests that Khachaturian has long been considered a "lighter-weight participant among 20th-century composers", while classic music broadcaster Norman Gilliland describes him as a "major" composer of the 20th century. Tim Ashley wrote in The Guardian in 2009 that Khachaturian's popularity fell in the West, because of his image as one of Soviet music's "yes-men". He argued, "Such a view is simplistic, given that he had a major brush with the authorities in 1948." In 2003 conductor Marin Alsop opined that Khachaturian is "very underperformed" and "somewhat underrated․"

Anne Midgette opined that Khachaturian is "remembered for Technicolor music, film-score-like in scale and sensibility." David Nice wrote in BBC Music Magazine that Khachaturian did best in dance and incidental music. Bernard Holland described Spartacus as "Socialist-Realism schlock", but argued that "Khachaturian writes inventive schlock—comfortably entertaining yet not without surprises." New York Times critic Harold C. Schonberg was often critical of Khachaturian. In 1968 he wrote that "Even at his best he was a minor figure, and his music these days has little to offer. Not because it is conventional, but because its materials and ideas are second-rate." Although describing him as an important and highly popular composer and a "man of pronounced gifts", Schonberg argued on his death in 1978 that Khachaturian "frankly composed popular music" and that after being exposed to his work it becomes evident that it is mostly "formula writing". While praising his work as exotic and colorful, he described Khachaturian as a "bureaucratic composer, turning out well-crafted pieces of no particular personality, and certainly nothing that would rock the boat". In 1968 New York Post music critic Harriett Johnson argued that while some may describe Khachaturian's style as "pop," she praised "the individuality of his melodies, infiltrated as they are with Oriental flavor of his Armenian heritage" and "the elemental surge of his rhythm which easily grows wild." She described him as an "immense musician who believes in the peasant heart and who has said so unabashedly in his music."

=== Recognition in Armenia ===
One of the "modern icons of Armenian pride", Khachaturian is considered a national treasure, and is celebrated by the Armenian people "as a famous son who earned world-wide recognition". Khachaturian was the most renowned Armenian composer of the 20th century, and the most famous representative of Soviet Armenian culture. He has been described as "by far the most important Armenian composer", the "Armenian Tchaikovsky", and deemed a key figure in 20th-century Armenian culture. He remains the only Armenian composer to rise to international significance. (Note: "Aram Khachaturian was the first, and so far the only, Armenian composer to achieve world renown.") Khachaturian is credited for bringing Armenian music worldwide recognition. Şahan Arzruni has described him as "the musical ambassador of Armenian culture".

== Posthumous honors and tribute ==
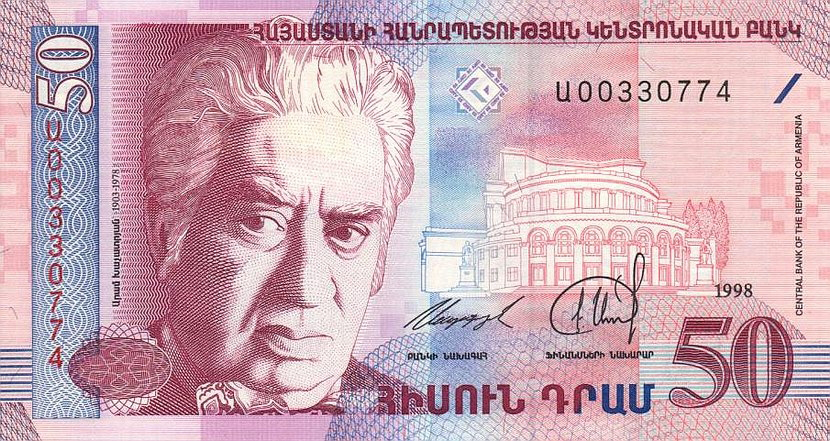
Khachaturian appeared on the 50-dram banknote (1998–2004)

The philharmonic hall of the Yerevan Opera Theater has been officially called the Aram Khachaturian Grand Concert Hall since 1978. The House-Museum of Aram Khachaturian in Yerevan was inaugurated in 1982.

Two younger Armenian composers dedicated pieces to Khachaturian's memory. Arno Babajanyan composed an elegy inspired by Sayat-Nova upon his death, while Edvard Mirzoyan composed Poem Epitaph In Memory of Aram Khachaturian, for string orchestra in 1988, on the 10th anniversary of his death.

In 1998, the Central Bank of Armenia issued 50-dram banknotes depicting Khachaturian's portrait and the Yerevan Opera Theater on the obverse and an episode from the ballet Gayane and Mount Ararat on the reverse. It remained in use until 2004 when it was replaced by a coin. He is one of the two composers depicted on the Armenian currency (the other is Komitas, who is depicted on the 10,000 dram banknote since 2018).

In 2013, UNESCO inscribed a collection of Khachaturian's handwritten notes and film music in the Memory of the World international register.

Music schools are named after Khachaturian in Tbilisi, Moscow (established in 1967, named after him in 1996), Yerevan, Martuni, Nagorno-Karabakh, and Watertown, Massachusetts, U.S. (run by the Hamazkayin). Streets in Yerevan, Tbilisi, Moscow and elsewhere are named after Khachaturian.

The Aram Khachaturian International Competition has been held annually in Yerevan since 2003.

=== Statues ===
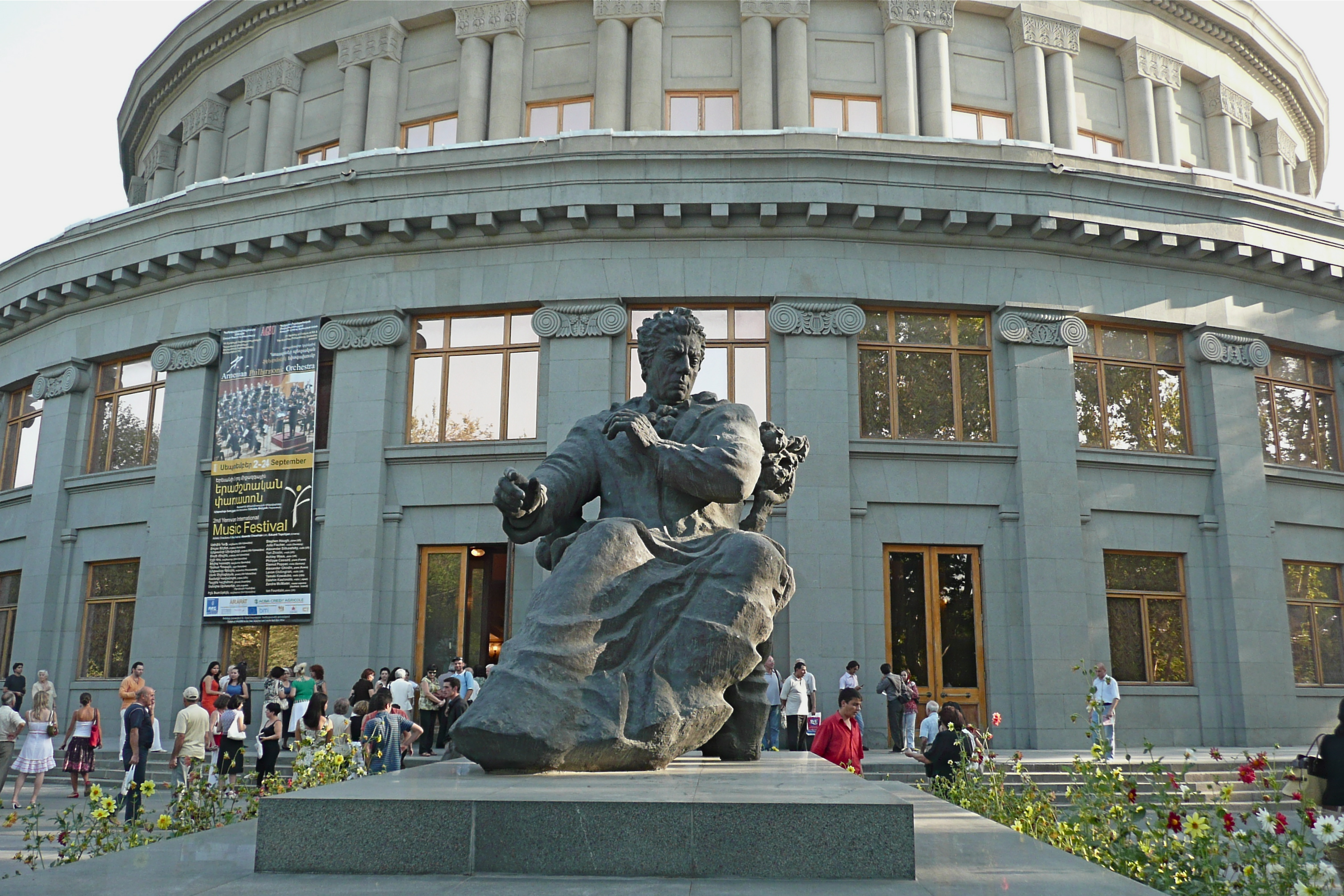
Khachaturian's statue near the Yerevan Opera Theater

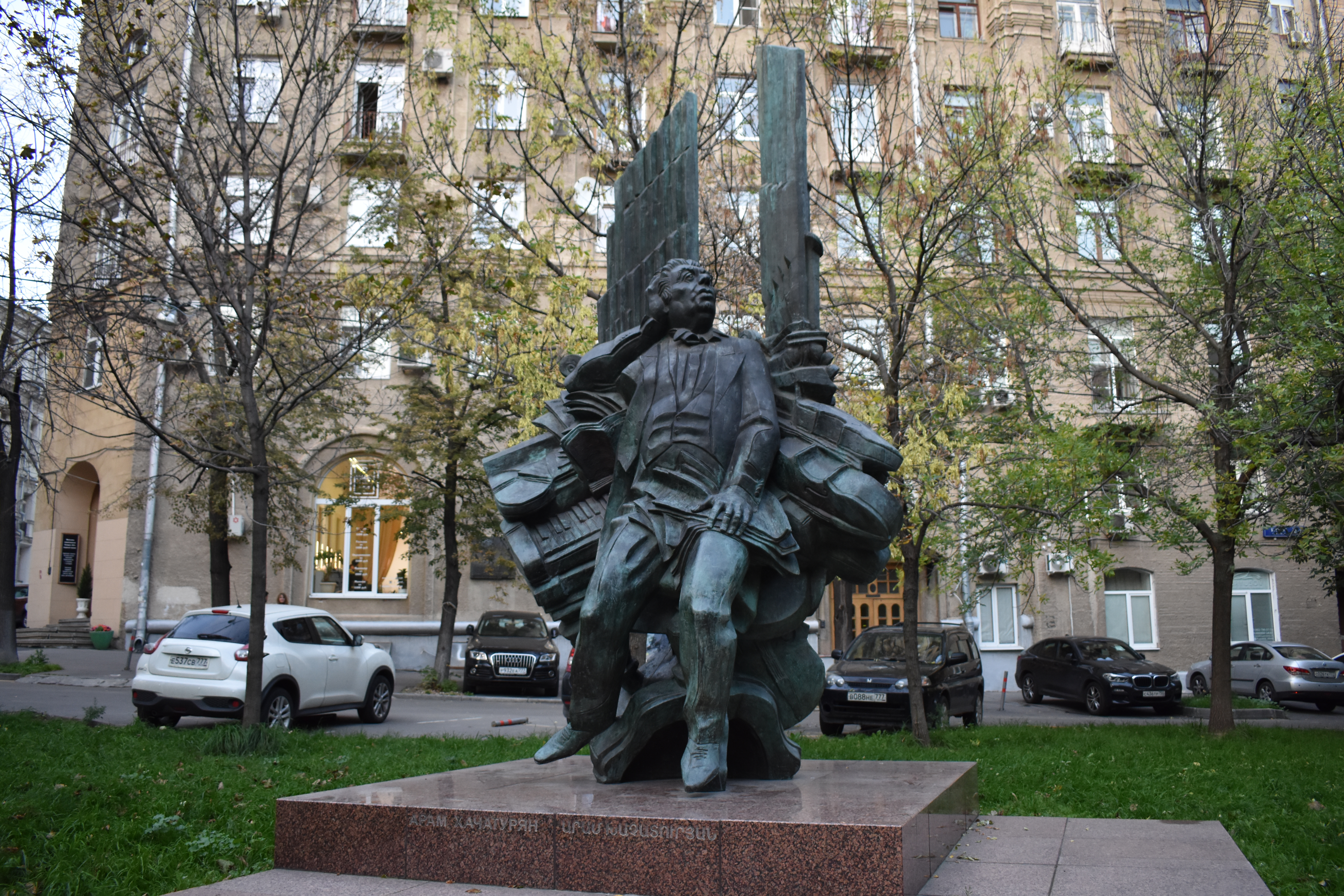
Khachaturian statue in Moscow

On 31 July 1999 a three-and-a-half meter high statue of Khachaturian in 19th-century realist style by Yuri Petrosyan was unveiled before the Khachaturian Hall of the Yerevan Opera Theater in attendance of President Robert Kocharyan, Speaker Karen Demirchyan and leading poet Silva Kaputikyan. On 30 April 2013, a bust of Khachaturian erected by sculptor Gevorg Gevorgyan was opened in the street named after him in Yerevan's Arabkir district by Yerevan Mayor Taron Margaryan on his 110th anniversary.

A statue of Khachaturian by Georgy Frangulyan was unveiled in Moscow on 31 October 2006. Notable attendees included Armenian President Kocharyan, Moscow Mayor Yury Luzhkov and Russia's First Lady Lyudmila Putina. Busts of Khachaturian by the Armenian sculptor Mikael Soghoyan were erected at the Moscow Conservatory in 2017 and in front of an arts school named after him in Nizhny Novgorod in August 2021.

=== Films ===
In 1977, a year before his death, Studio Ekran made a documentary on Khachaturian. In 1985, the Yerevan Studio produced another TV documentary on him. In 2003, an 83-minute-long documentary about Khachaturian with unique footage was directed by Peter Rosen and narrated by Eric Bogosian. The film won the Best Documentary at the 2003 Hollywood Film Festival. In 2004, TV Kultura, Russia's government-owned art channel, made a documentary on Khachaturian entitled Century of Aram Khachaturian (Век Арама Хачатуряна).

== Awards and honors ==
Soviet Union

- Stalin Prize second degree (1941) – for Violin Concerto
- Stalin Prize first degree (1943) – for ballet Gayane
- Stalin Prize first degree (1946) – for the Second Symphony
- Stalin Prize first degree (1950) – for the film The Battle of Stalingrad)
- USSR State Prize (1971) – for the Triad of Concerto-Rhapsodies: for violin and orchestra; for cello and orchestra; for piano and orchestra)
- Lenin Prize (1959) – for the ballet Spartacus
- Hero of Socialist Labour (1973)
- Order of Lenin (1939, 1963, 1973)
- People's Artist of the USSR (1954), Russian SFSR (1947), Armenian SSR (1955), Georgian SSR (1963), Azerbaijan SSR (1973)
- Honored Art Worker of the Armenian SSR (1938), Russian SFSR (1944), Uzbek SSR (1967)
- Order of the Red Banner of Labour (1945, 1966)
- Order of the October Revolution (1971)

Academic titles

- Professor of Music — 1950
- Full Member (Academician) of the Academy of Sciences of the Armenian SSR — 1963
- Doctor of Arts (Доктор искусствоведения), Academy of Sciences of the USSR — 1965

Other states

- Order of the Science of Art of the United Arab Republic (1961, "for outstanding musical achievements")
- Medal of Pope John XXIII (1963)
- Medal of the Iranian Shah (1965)
- Honored Art Worker of Polish People's Republic (1972, "for contribution to the Polish culture")
- Ordre des Arts et des Lettres (France) and title of Commandeur (1974)

Honorary titles

- Honorary Member of the Accademia Nazionale di Santa Cecilia, Rome, Italy — 1960
- Corresponding Member of the Academy of Arts of the German Democratic Republic — 1961
- Honorary Professor of the Conservatorio Nacional de Música, Mexico City — 1960

== Bibliography ==
=== Books and book chapters ===
- Bagar, Robert; Biancolli, Louis (1947). The Concept Companion: A comprehensive guide to symphonic music. New York & London: Whittlesey House.
- Bakst, James (1977). "Khachaturyan". A History of Russian-Soviet Music (Reprint ed.). Westport, Connecticut: Greenwood Press. ISBN 0837194229.
- Robinson, Harlow (2013). "The Caucasian Connection: National Identity in the Ballets of Aram Khachaturian". In Kanet, Roger E. (ed.). Identities, Nations and Politics After Communism. Routledge. pp. 23–32. ISBN 9781317968665.
- Shakarian, Pietro A. (2025). Anastas Mikoyan: An Armenian Reformer in Khrushchev's Kremlin. Bloomington: Indiana University Press. ISBN 978-0253073556.
- Shneerson, Grigory (1959). Aram Khachaturyan. Xenia Danko (translator). Moscow: Foreign Languages Publishing House.
- Yuzefovich, Victor (1985). Aram Khachaturyan. Nicholas Kournokoff and Vladimir Bobrov (translators). New York: Sphinx Press. ISBN 0-8236-8658-2.
- Hakobian, Levon [in Russian] (2016). Music of the Soviet Era: 1917-1991 (2nd ed.). London: Routledge. ISBN 9781317091875.

=== Dictionary and encyclopedia articles ===
- "Aram Ilich Khachaturian". Encyclopedia of World Biography. Detroit: Gale. 2004.
- "Aram Khachaturian". The Complete Classical Music Guide. London: Dorling Kindersley. 2012. p. 301. ISBN 9781465401342.
- Blackwood, Alan (2013). "Aram Khachaturian". In Stacy, Lee; Henderson, Lol (eds.). Encyclopedia of Music in the 20th Century. Abingdon, Oxon: Routledge. p. 341. ISBN 978-1-57958-079-7.
- Geodakyan, Gevorg (1979). "Խաչատրյան Արամ [Khachatryan Aram]". Soviet Armenian Encyclopedia Volume 5 (in Armenian). Yerevan: Armenian Encyclopedia Publishing. pp. 18–20.
- Geodakyan, Gevorg (1981). "Хачатурян А. И. [Khachaturian A. I.]". Музыкальная энциклопедия [Musical Encyclopedia] (in Russian). Moscow: Sovetskaya Entsiklopediya and Sovetsky Kompozitor. Archived from the original on 22 March 2014.
- Johnston, Blair (2005). "Aram Khachaturian: Artist Biography". In Woodstra, Chris; Brennan, Gerald; Schrott, Allen (eds.). All Music Guide to Classical Music: The Definitive Guide to Classical Music. San Francisco: Backbeat Books. pp. 685–6. ISBN 9780879308650.; also available online at AllMusic
- "Khachaturian, Aram". Current Biography Yearbook. 9. New York: H. W. Wilson Company: 345. 1949.
- Lebrecht, Norman (1996). "Aram Khachaturian". The Companion to 20th-century Music. New York: Da Capo Press. p. 183. ISBN 9780306807343.
- McCollum, Jonathan; Nercessian, Andy (2004). "Aram Khachaturian". Armenian Music: A Comprehensive Bibliography and Discography. Lanham, Maryland: Scarecrow Press. pp. 95–96. ISBN 9780810849679.
- Petrak, Albert M., ed. (1985). "Khachaturian, Aram Ilyich". David Mason Greene's Biographical Encyclopedia of Composers (1st ed.). Garden City, New York: Reproducing Piano Roll Foundation. pp. 1329–30. ISBN 9780385142786.
- Randel, Don Michael, ed. (1996). "Khachaturian, Aram Il'yich". The Harvard Biographical Dictionary of Music. Cambridge: Harvard University Press. p. 445. ISBN 9780674372993. "Khachaturian, Aram Il'yich."
- Rosenberg, Kenyon C. (1987). "Khachaturian, Aram". A Basic Classical and Operatic Recordings Collection for Libraries. Metuchen, New Jersey: Scarecrow Press. pp. 111–112. ISBN 9780810820418.
- Tomoff, Kiril (2006). Creative Union: The Professional Organization of Soviet Composers, 1939-1953. Ithaca, New York: Cornell University Press. pp. 34–35. ISBN 9780801444111.

=== Journal articles ===
- Chebotaryan, Gayane (1963). "OA Portal in Armenia" Արամ Խաչատրյան (Ծննդյան 60-ամյակի առթիվ). Patma-Banasirakan Handes (in Armenian). 3 (3). Yerevan: Armenian Academy of Sciences: 109–114.
- Ehrenburg, Ilya; Khachaturian, Aram; Pomerantsev, V. (1954). "Three Soviet artists on the present needs of Soviet art". Soviet Studies. 5 (4). Routledge: 412–445. doi:10.1080/09668135408409919.
- Frolova-Walker, Marina (Summer 1998). ""National in Form, Socialist in Content": Musical Nation-Building in the Soviet Republics". Journal of the American Musicological Society. 51 (2). University of California Press on behalf of the American Musicological Society: 331–337. doi:10.2307/831980. JSTOR 831980.
- Keldysh, Georgi (Summer 1954). "Soviet Music Today". Tempo. 32 (32): 23–28. doi:10.1017/S0040298200051883. JSTOR 943199. S2CID 145524684.
- N., G. (July 1978). "Aram Khachaturian". The Musical Times. 19 (1625). Musical Times Publications: 619. JSTOR 958852.
- Orga, Ates (1997). "Aram Il'yich Khachaturian (1903–1978)". Naxos Records. Archived from the original on 12 March 2014.
- Shostakovich, Dmitri (1959). "Яркий талант [Bright talent]". Music Academy (in Russian) (6). [an essay praising Khachaturian]
- Steyn, Carol (2009). "Khachaturyan in Armenia today: his presence in Armenian music, art and architecture, rooted in Socialist Realism" (PDF). South African Journal of Art History. 24 (3): 9–23. ISSN 0258-3542. Archived from the original (PDF) on 14 August 2014.
- Ter-Ghazarian, Zara (1983). "OA Portal in Armenia" Ա. Խաչատրյանի "Մակբեթ" ներկայացման պարտիտուրը [The score of A. Khachaturian's play "Macbeth"]. Lraber Hasarakakan Gitutyunneri (in Armenian). 6 (6). Yerevan: Armenian Academy of Sciences: 23–28. ISSN 0320-8117.
- Tigranova, Irina G. (1970). "OA Portal in Armenia" Արամ Խաչատրյանի ոճի մի առանձնահատկության մասին [About a Certain Particuliarity of Aram Khachatourian's Style]. Lraber Hasarakakan Gitutyunneri (in Armenian). 1 (1). Yerevan: Armenian Academy of Sciences: 26–35.

=== Newspaper articles ===
- "Khachaturian, a Leading Soviet Composer, Dies at 74". The New York Times. 3 May 1978. (archived)
- Holland, Bernard (14 October 2003). "Khachaturian Beckons With Little-Known Works". The New York Times.
- Huizenga, Tom (5 June 2005). "The 'Sabre Dance' Man". NPR. Archived from the original on 17 March 2014.
- Pritsker, Maya (5 October 2003). "What Could Khachaturian Do Besides An Encore?". The New York Times.
