= List of compositions by Aram Khachaturian =

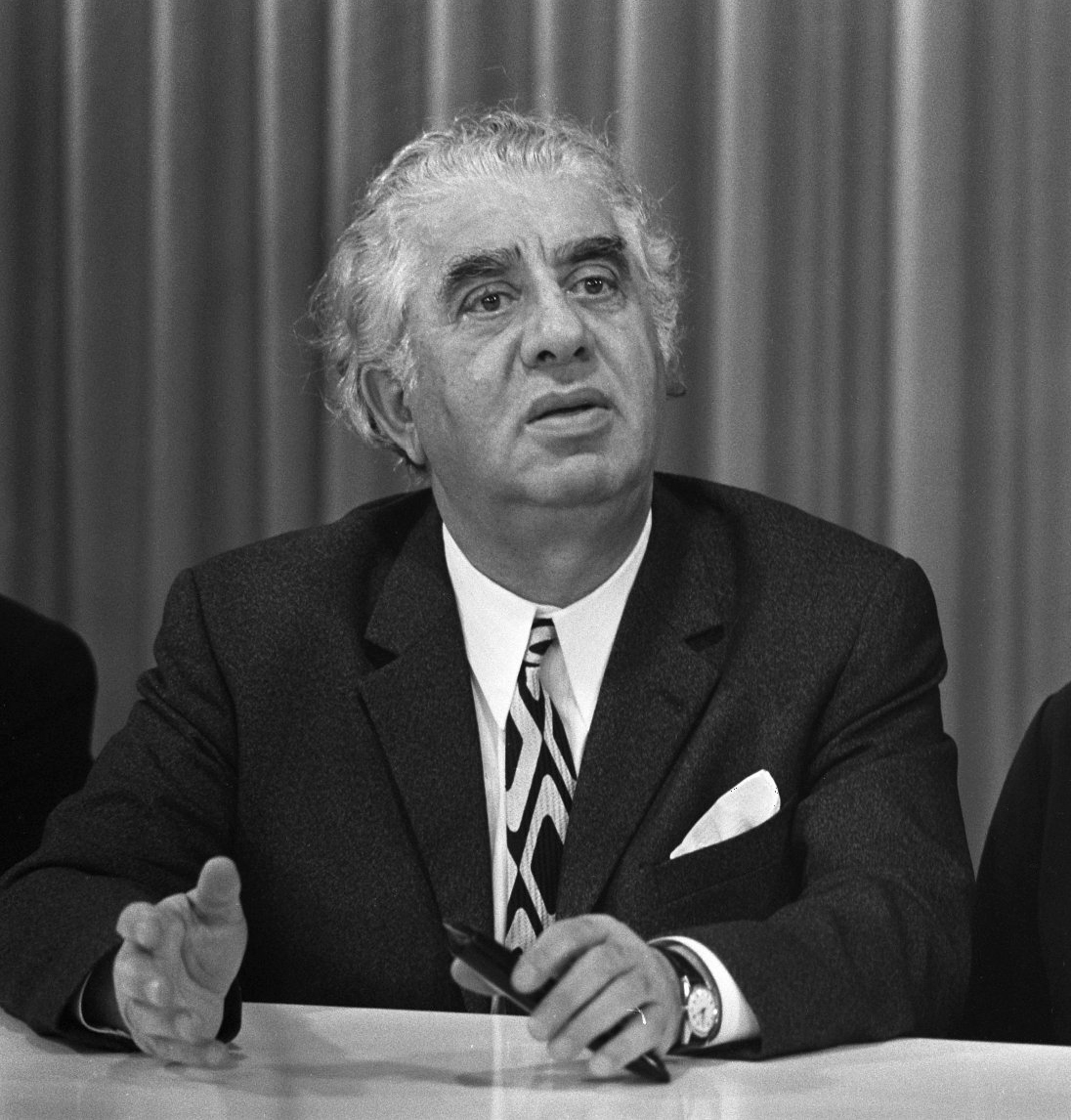
Aram Khachaturian in 1971

This is a list of compositions by Armenian composer Aram Khachaturian.

== Ballets ==
- Shchastye ("Happiness"; Yerevan, 1939)
- Gayane (1939–41), which includes the famous Sabre Dance, and the "Adagio" of 2001: A Space Odyssey
- Spartacus (1950–54)

== Orchestral ==
- Symphonies
  - Symphony No. 1 (1934)
  - Symphony No. 2 The Bell Symphony (two versions: 1943, 1944)
  - Symphony No. 3 Symphony-Poem (1947)
- Dance Suite (1933)
- Violin Concerto in D minor (1940)
- Suite from Gayane No. 1 (1943)
- Suite from Gayane No. 2 (1943)
- Suite from Gayane No. 3 (1943)
- State Anthem of the Armenian SSR (1944)
- The Russian Fantasy (1944)
- Suite from Masquerade (1944)
- Ode in Memory of Vladimir Ilich Lenin (1948)
- Suite from Battle of Stalingrad (1949)
- Triumphal Poem, a festive poem (1950)
- Suite from The Valencian Widow (1952)
- Suite from Spartacus No. 1 (1955)
- Suite from Spartacus No. 2 (1955)
- Suite from Spartacus No. 3 (1955)
- Symphonic Pictures from Spartacus (1955)
- Greeting (or Salutatory) Overture (1958)
- Suite from Lermontov (1959)

== Vocal orchestral ==
- Poem about Stalin (1938)
- Three Arias (Poem, Legend, Dithyramb), for high pitched voice and orchestra (1946)
- Ode of Joy, ballade for female soloist, chorus, violins, harps, and orchestra (1956)
- Ballade about Motherland, for soloist and symphony orchestra (1961)

== Songs ==
English title	Russian title	Year	Notes
	Армянская застольная	1948	
Avio-March	Авиамарш	?	
Ayu-Dag	Аю-Даг	?	
Oh, Where Is She	Ах, где она?	1957	Song in Armenian
Homeland Ballad	Баллада о Родине	1961	
	Будь готов	?	
Into Fight, Comrades!	В бой, камарадос	1936	
In a Great Time, Friends, We Live	В завидное время, друзья, мы живем...	?	
	Вальс дружбы	1951	
To You, Arabian Friends	Вам, арабские друзья	1964	
Spring Carnival	Весенний карнавал	1956	
	Встреча с поэтом	1948	
Guard's March	Гвардейский марш	1942	
State Anthem of Armenian SSR	Государственный гимн Армянской ССР	1944	
Children of Lenin	Дети Ленина	1935	
	Джавуз идим	1931	
Dithiramb	Дифирамб	1946	
Daughters of Iran	Дочери Ирана	1939	
Waiting for You	Жду тебя	1943	
	Заводская-станковая	?	
Into School Tomorrow	Завтра в школу	1933	
Dancing	Игровая	1931	
Captain Gastello	Капитан Гастелло	1941	
	Ковер счастья	1950	
Komsomolets	Комсомолец	1931	
Komsomolets and Komsomolka	Комсомолец и комсомолка	1931	
Komsomol Song	Комсомольская песня	1948	
	Комсомольская-шахтерская	1931	
Korean Partisan Song	Корейская партизанская песня	1952	Originally composed by Sunnam Kim
Red Fleet March	Краснофлотский марш	1933	
Legend	Легенда	1946	
Peace March	Марш мира	1962	
	Могучий Урал	1942	
Baltic Sea	Море Балтийское	1941	
My Homeland	Моя Родина	1950	
A Musical Pamphlet	Музыкальный памфлет	1951	
We Shall Win!	Мы победим!	1939	
On the Gogol Boulevard	На бульваре Гоголя	1935	
In Our Forest	На нашем лугу	1931	
We're Always Joyful	Нам сегодня весело	1963	
Ear Started Earing	Начал колос колоситься	1932	
Our Future	Наше будущее	1931	
New Song	Новая песня	1931	
What Children Phantasy About	О чем мечтают дети	1949	Lyrics by Viktor Vinnikov
What Children Phantasy About	О чем мечтают дети	1949	Lyrics by Petr Gradov
Patriotic Song	Патриотическая песня	?	
A Peace Protector's Song	Песня защитниц мира	1951	
Song	Песня	1952	
Song of Zulfia	Песня Зульфии	1939	From film "Сад"
Song About a Girl	Песня о девушке	1950	
	Песня о дружбе народов	1968	
Song about Erevan	Песня о Ереване	1948	
Red Army Song	Песня о Красной Армии	1943	In collaboration with Shostakovich
	Песня о пограничнике	1938	
	Песня про иву	1956	From film Othello
Pepo's Song	Песня Пэпо	1934	From film Pepo
Heart's Song	Песня сердца	1949	
Russian Sailors' Song	Песня русских матросов	1953	From film "Корабли штурмуют бастионы"
Red Fleet Song	Песня Черноморского флота (Краснофлотская)	1931	
Pioneer Olya	Пионерка Оля	1933	
	Пионерский барабан	1933	
Under Rain	Под дождем	1937	
	Полевая песня	1931	
	Походная красноармейская песня ударника обороны...	1932	
	Походная песня	1953	
Poem	Поэма	1946	
	Присяга миру	1950	
Romance of Nina	Романс Нины		From Mikhail Lermontov's Masquerade
Satiric	Сатирическая	1932	
World of Loving Eyes	Свет любимых глаз	1962	
Glory to Our Fatherland!	Слава нашей Отчизне!	1943	
Airplane	Самолет	?	
Comrade Hassan	Товарищ Гасан	1931	
	Третий заем	?	
Uralochka	Уралочка	1943	
Uralians Fight Hard	Уральцы бьются здорово	1942	

== Concertos ==
- Piano Concerto in D-flat major (1936)
- Violin Concerto in D minor (1940)
- Cello Concerto in E minor (1946)
- Concerto-Rhapsody for violin and orchestra (1961)
- Concerto-Rhapsody for cello and orchestra (1963)
- Concerto-Rhapsody for piano and orchestra (1968)

== Chamber ==
- Double Fugue for String Quartet (1931)
- Trio for Clarinet, Violin and Piano (1932)

== Instrumental ==
- Roaming Ashug's Song for cello and piano (1925)
- Elegy for cello and piano (1925)
- Piece for cello and piano (1926)
- Dance No. 1 for violin and piano (1926)
- Dream for cello and piano (1927)
- Pantomime for oboe and piano (1927)
- Allegretto for violin and piano (1929)
- Song-Poem (in Honor of Ashugs) for violin and piano (1929)
- Suite for viola and piano (1929)
- Mass Dance for bayan (1932)
- Violin Sonata (1932)
- Nocturne from Masquerade for violin and piano (1941)
- Sonata-Fantasia for unaccompanied cello (1974)
- Sonata-Monologue for unaccompanied violin (1975)
- Sonata-Song for solo viola (1976)

== Piano ==
- Poem (1925)
- Waltz-Etude (1926)
- Andantino (1926)
- Poem (1926)
- Poem (1927)
- Variations on the Theme "Solveig" (1928)
- Seven Recitatives and Fugues (1928, 1966)
- Suite (Toccata, Waltz-Capriccio, Dance) (1932; the Toccata is now best known as a piece separate from the suite)
- Dance No. 3 (1933)
- March No. 3 (1934)
- Budenovka, a mass dance (undated)
- Choreographic Waltz (1944)
- Three Pieces for two pianos (Ostinato, Romance, Fantastic Waltz) (1945)
- Album for Children No. 1, 10 pieces (1947)
- Waltz from Masquerade (1952)
- Piano Sonatina (1959)
- Piano Sonata (1961)
- Album for Children No. 2 (1965)
- Adventures of Ivan (1947)

== Incidental music ==
- Uncle Baghdasar (1927)
- Khatabala (1928)
- Oriental Dentist (1928)
- Debt of Honor (1931)
- Macbeth (1933)
- Devastated Home (1935)
- Great Day (1937)
- Baku (1937)
- The Valencian Widow (1940)
- Masquerade (1941)
- Kremlin Chimes (1942)
- Sound Scout (1943)
- The Last Day (1945)
- Southern Bale (1947)
- Tale About The Truth (1947)
- Ilya Golovin (1949)
- Spring Current (1953)
- Guardian Angel from Nebraska (1953)
- Lermontov (1954)
- Macbeth (1955)
- King Lear (1958)

== Film scores ==
- Pepo (1934-5)
- Zangezur (1937-8)
- The Garden (1939)
- Salavat Yulayev (1941)
- Girl No. 217 (1945)
- The Russian Question (1948)
- Vladimir Ilich Lenin (1948-9)
- The Battle of Stalingrad (1949)
- They Have a Motherland (1949)
- Secret Mission (1950)
- Admiral Ushakov (1953)
- Ships Storming the Bastions (1953)
- Saltanat (1955)
- Othello (1956)
- Undying Flame (1956)
- The Duel (1957)
- The Tocsin of Peace (1962)
- Those People of the Nile (1972)

== Wind band ==
- Combat March No. 1 (1929)
- Combat March No. 2 (1930)
- Dancing Music (on the theme of an Armenian song) (1932)
- March No. 3 (Uzbek March) (1932)
- Dance (on the theme of an Armenian song) (1932)
- To the Heroes of the Patriotic War, a march (1942)
- March of the Moscow Red Banner Militia (1973)
