= Matsuya (surname) =

Matsuya is a Japanese surname. Notable people with the surname include:

- Midori Matsuya (1943–1994), Japanese pianist
- Minoru Matsuya (1910–1995), Japanese jazz pianist

== Fictional characters ==
- Taki Matsuya, Marvel Comics character
- Misaki Matsuya, a character in the manga Excel Saga
