= Matsuya =

Matsuya may refer to:

- Matsuya (department store), Japanese department store
- Matsuya (surname)
- Matsuya Foods Co., a gyudon chain in Japan

== See also ==
- Matsya
