= Spartacus (ballet) =

Ballet by Aram Khachaturian

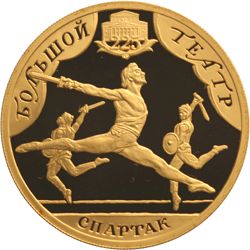
- Commemorative coin of the 225th anniversary of the Bolshoi Theater, with a representation of the ballet Spartacus as the center
- Choreographer: Leonid Yakobson
- Music: Aram Khachaturian
- Premiere: 1956 (70 years ago); Kirov Theatre, Leningrad, Soviet Union
- Original ballet company: Kirov Ballet
- Characters: Crassus; Spartacus; Phrygia; Aegina
- Genre: Neoclassical ballet

Spartacus (Russian: «Спартак», Spartak) is a ballet by Aram Khachaturian (1903–1978). The work follows the exploits of Spartacus, the leader of the slave uprising against the Romans known as the Third Servile War, although the ballet's storyline takes considerable liberties with the historical record.

Khachaturian composed Spartacus in 1954, and was awarded a Lenin Prize for the composition in 1959. It was first staged in Leningrad on 27 December 1956, as choreographed by Leonid Yakobson, for the Kirov Theatre of Opera and Ballet (Mariinsky Theatre), where it stayed in repertory for many years, but only with qualified success since Yakobson abandoned conventional pointe in his choreography.

Yakobson restaged his version for the Bolshoi Ballet in 1962 and it was part of the Bolshoi's 1962 tour to New York. The ballet received its first staging at the Bolshoi Theatre, Moscow in 1958, choreographed by Igor Moiseyev; however, it was the 1968 production, choreographed by Yury Grigorovich, which achieved the greatest acclaim for the ballet.

Spartacus remains one of Khachaturian's best-known works and is prominent within the repertoires of the Bolshoi Theatre and other ballet companies in Russia and the former Soviet Union.

== Synopsis ==
Principal characters:

- Crassus, Roman consul
- Spartacus, captive king of Thrace
- Phrygia, wife of Spartacus
- Aegina, concubine to Crassus

=== Act I ===
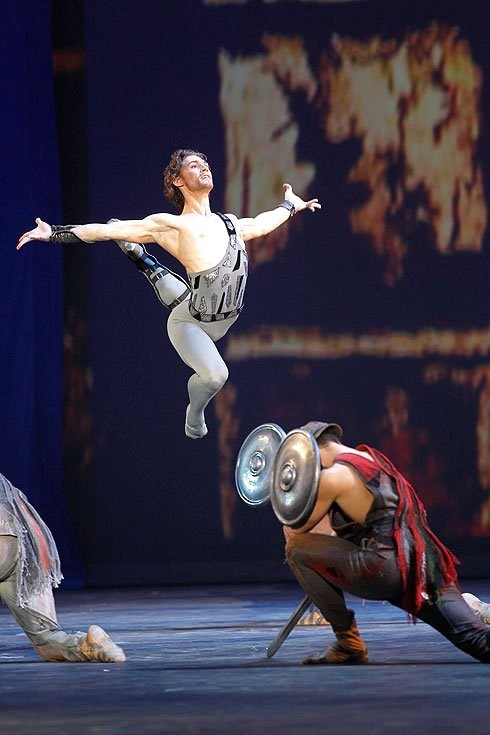
Ivan Vasiliev in an extract from Spartacus during re-opening gala of the Bolshoi Theatre, 28 October 2011

The Roman consul Crassus returns to Rome from his latest conquests in a triumphal procession. Among his captives are the Thracian king Spartacus and his wife Phrygia. Spartacus laments his captivity and bids a bitter farewell to Phrygia, who is taken off to join Crassus's harem of concubines. To entertain Crassus and his entourage, Spartacus is sent into the gladiatorial ring and is forced to kill a close friend. Horrified at his deed, Spartacus incites his fellow captives to rebellion.

=== Act II ===
The escaped captives celebrate their freedom. Meanwhile, Crassus entertains the Roman patricians with lavish entertainment. Spartacus and the other escaped captives disrupt the orgy and rescue the slave women, including Phrygia. Aegina insists that Crassus pursue the slave army immediately. The lovers celebrate their escape to the "Adagio of Spartacus and Phrygia".

=== Act III ===
Aegina discovers Spartacus's camp and observes the lovers emerging from their tent the next morning. Aegina sends word to Crassus, who sends his army in pursuit. Internecine struggles break out among Spartacus's forces. Finally, Crassus's forces discover Spartacus and impale him upon their spears. Spartacus's closest followers recover his body and carry it off while Phrygia mourns her loss.

== Orchestral adaptation ==
Khachaturian extracted and arranged music from the ballet in 1955 for four orchestral suites:

- Spartacus Suite No.1
  - Introduction – Dance of the Nymphs
  - Adagio of Aegina and Harmodius
  - Variation of Aegina and Bacchanalia
  - Scene and Dance with Crotala
  - Dance of the Gaditanae – Victory of Spartacus
- Spartacus Suite No.2
  - Adagio of Spartacus and Phrygia
  - Entrance of the Merchants – Dance of a Roman Courtesan –
  - General Dance
  - Entrance of Spartacus – Quarrel –
  - Treachery of Harmodius
  - Dance of the Pirates
- Spartacus Suite No.3
  - Dance of a Greek Slave
  - Dance of an Egyptian Girl
  - Night Incident
  - Dance of Phrygia – Parting Scene
  - At the Circus
- Spartacus Suite No.4
  - Bacchante's Melancholy Dance
  - Spartacus Procession
  - Death of the Gladiator
  - Call to Arms – Spartacus' Uprising

Instrumentation: 2 flutes, 2 oboes, 2 clarinets, 2 bassoons; 4 horns, 4 trumpets, 3 trombones, tuba; timpani, percussion; strings.

== In popular culture ==
- The "Adagio of Spartacus and Phrygia" (the opening piece in Suite No. 2), was used as the main love theme in the 1968 film Mayerling, and afterwards in other films including The Hudsucker Proxy (1994), Ice Age: The Meltdown (2006), IF (2024), and in Caligula (1979), where a disco version of the theme with lyrics by the artist Lydia was released as a single from the soundtrack.
- The Adagio was the opening theme for the British television series The Onedin Line (1971–1980) as well as in advertisements for Philips television sets in Australia in the late 1970s.
- Spartakus, a 1977 Soviet musical/ballet film directed by Vadim Derbenyov and Yuri Grigorovich, which is also a remake of the Bolshoi Theater's 1968 production also choreographed by Grigorovich.
- Portions of the ballet were performed by the Phantom Regiment Drum and Bugle Corps in 1981, 1982, and 2008 – with the Corps winning the 2008 DCI World Championship title, performing their interpretation of the ballet.
- In 1984, with words by Tony Hiller and Nicky Graham, it became a popular song, "Journey's End", recorded by Andy Williams on Capitol.
- In 1990, Mexican rock band Caifanes used "Adagio of Spartacus and Phrygia" for their hit song "Antes de que nos olviden" (Before We're Forgotten) from their album El Diablito.
- In 2004, Ukrainian rhythmic gymnast Anna Bessonova performed her bronze medal ball routine at the Athens Olympics to an excerpt of the Adagio.
- Michelle Kwan used "Adagio of Sparticus and Phrygia" for her short program in the 2004–2005 season, winning the 2005 US. Figure Skating Championships.
- Oksana Domnina and Maxim Shabalin won the 2009 World Figure Skating Championships Ice Dance competition with their free dance to the Adagio.
- Ashley Wagner won the 2015 U.S. Figure Skating Championships with her short program to the Adagio.

== See also ==
- List of ballets by title
- List of compositions by Aram Khachaturian
- List of historical ballet characters
