= Grigory Mikhaylovich Shneyerov =

Grigory Mikhaylovich Shneyerov (Russian: Григорий Михайлович Шнеерсон), sometimes given as Grigori Mikhailovich Schneerson, (13 March 1901 – 5 February 1982) was a Russian musicologist, pianist, and conductor.

== Life and career ==
Grigory Mikhaylovich Shneyerov was born in Yeniseysk, Siberia on 13 March 1901. He was trained as a pianist at the Petrograd Conservatory where he studied from 1915 through 1918. After graduating from the conservatory he relocated to Moscow where he studied privately with Nikolay Medtner around the end of World War I. He later studied in Moscow with Konstantin Igumnov from 1921 to 1923.

While living in Moscow, Shneyerov was employed at the Proletkult and worked as a conductor at several different theaters in that city. He was general secretary of the Communist Party's International Music Bureau from 1931 to 1935, and was head of the foreign bureau of the Union of Russian Composers from 1935 to 1940. From 1942 to 1948 he was director of the music department at VOKS, and from 1948 to 1961 he served as international editor of the journal Sovetskaya muzïka (now known as Muzykalnaya Akademiya). In 1968 he was elected president of the Soviet committee to Répertoire International de Littérature Musicale, and that same year was elected as a member of the Akademie der Künste der DDR.

As a musicologist, Shneerson's published work on Chinese music and on contemporary Western music, particularly music of England, France, Germany, and the United States. He was particularly critical of what he deemed "Western bourgeois art". In 1955 his book on global music, Pesni narodov mira, was published in Moscow. He also wrote books on American music (Sovremennaya amerikanskaya muzïka, 1945; Amerikanskaya pesnya, 1977; and Portretï amerikanskikh kompozitorov, 1977); Chinese music (Muzïkal′naya kul′tura Kitaya, 1952); French music (Muzïka Frantsii, 1958); and English music (Sovremennaya angliyskaya muzïka, 1949). At a period in history when the Iron Curtain was firmly in place, he was able to successfully write on contemporary foreign culture for a Russian audience.

Shneyerov died in Moscow on 5 February 1982.
