= Hiroaki Zakōji =

Japanese composer and pianist

Hiroaki Zakōji (座光寺 公明, Zakōji Hiroaki; born January 20, 1958 – January 29, 1987) was a Japanese composer and pianist.

== Biography ==
He was born in Tokyo on January 20, 1958. He was brought up in Asahikawa, Hokkaido from the age of 4 and lived there until he was 20 years old. He started learning to play the piano when he was 4 years old. From the age of 16, he studied composition under Masanobu Kimura.

In 1978, he entered the Music Department of Nihon University in Tokyo. There he learned composition under Kiyohiko Kijima and piano under Midori Matsuya (1943-1994). At the same time, he also studied composition under Roh Ogura (1916-1990) in Kamakura.

He graduated from university and entered the Music Institute of Nihon University in 1982. In the same year, he organised the Tokyo Shin-Wagaku Consort which regularly played his own and other contemporary composers' music.

In 1984, he performed Japanese contemporary works in Basel, Switzerland. In 1985, he was invited by the IGNM - Internationale Gesellschaft für Neue Musik - and performed his "Piano Piece I" (Op.28) in Basel. In April 1986, he returned to Switzerland where he composed and performed his "Piano Piece III" (Op.36) in Arlesheim near Basel. Also he travelled to Spain and Denmark and wrote an essay for a music journal. "Composition II" (Op.11) and "Composition" III (Op.13) were broadcast by a Spanish radio station.

In June 1986, he was one of the finalists in the Buddhist International Music Competition in Tokyo and his "Continuum" (Op.18) was given its first performance by the Tokyo Symphony Orchestra under Hiroyuki Iwaki (1932-2006).

He died just 9 days after his 29th birthday by acute cardiac failure on January 29, 1987, in Tokyo. He left 38 works in his short life of 29 years. All his scores and some music tapes are preserved in the Documentation Centre for Modern Japanese Music in Tokyo.

English composer, James Stevens wrote, "... His work was unique because, despite its essentially contemporary style, it owed nothing to any particular fad or fashion and thus was outside the mainstream of contemporary composers. His material was the product of an exquisite inner ear and it was treated with Mozartian integrity. It also embodied traditional Japanese concepts: hence he was able to compose with equal readiness for chamber group, synths, symphony orchestra or traditional instruments...."

Chamber Cello Concerto (Op. 29 a) was performed together with a work by Tōru Takemitsu and a work by Isang Yun in the concert, Orient Occident in Teatre Lliure in Barcelona in April and May in 1992.

In January 2008, some of Hiroaki's earlier works (Scherzo, Andante1, Adagio, Movement) were recorded by Catalan composer Llibert López Pascual. Scherzo was broadcast by Radio Fermo Uno in February 2008.

== Character ==
Since he was brought up in Hokkaidō, north part of Japan where the climate was cold and hard, he seemed to have acquired a very tough and patient character. He loved the nature and snow. He was extremely hard working. He was interested in Buddhism and the subject of "death". On the other hand, he was quite a sportsman who loved skiing. He had the 1st grade of Ski Association of Japan and he was working as a ski instructor at the Utsukushi-Gahara Mountain resort in Nagano in winter.

His interests in Japanese ancient mythology and history, as found in the Kojiki and Nihon-shoki, inspired him to write "Ame-no-Uzume" (Op.4). Also he was interested in Japanese traditional music, Gagaku and he wrote treatises, such as "Japanese Traditional Instruments" and "The research of Japanese traditional music and the conversion into my work". He loved the work of novelist Ryūnosuke Akutagawa. He left a notebook in which he was composing his new work, Opera, "The Spider's Thread" by Ryūnosuke Akutagawa when he died.

He won many friends with his sense of humor and character. Almost 300 people arrived to pay their respects at his funeral.

== Works ==
=== Orchestral music tunes ===
- Small Symphony for Strings, Op. 3 (1979)
- "Conversion" for Orchestra, Op. 7 (1980)
- "Meta Polyphony" for Orchestra, Op. 10 (1981)
- "Tied-Up Time" for Orchestra, Op. 32 (1982)
- "Time-Space Continuum", Op. 18 (1982) - 1st Performance: Buddhist Music International competition Tokyo 1986

=== Concertos ===
- Piano Concerto, Op. 21 (1983)
- Chamber Cello Concerto, Op. 29 a (1985)
- Chamber Cello Concerto, Op. 29 b (1985)

=== Chamber music ===
- Sonata for Flute and Piano, Op. 2 (1979)
- "Ame-no-Uzume", Music for Soprano Piano 3 Percussions and 7 Wind Instruments, Op. 4 (1980)
- Chamber Symphony, Op. 5 (1980)
- Composition I, "From the Inside of Silence" (Flute, Violin, Piano), Op. 8 (1981)
- String Quartet, Op. 9 (1981)
- String Quartet, Op. 12 a (1981)
- Prelude and Fugue for String Quartet, Op. 12 b (1981)
- Composition III, "KE" (Shakuhachi, Koto), Op. 13 (1981)
- "Time in the Time", for two Marimbas, Op. 17 (1982)
- Prelude for Strings, Op. 20 (1982)
- Piano Trio, (Piano, Flute, Violin), Op. 23 (1983)
- Quintet, (Flute, Clarinet, Violin, Violoncello, Piano), Op. 24 (1983)
- Composition V, Op. 26 (1983)
- Monodia, (Flute, Piano), Op. 31 (1985)
- Suite for Traditional Instrument, (Traverso, Va.da.Gamba, Cembalo), Op. 34 (1986)
- Composition VI, (Shakuhachi, Koto, Piano), Op. 37(1986)
- Morphology for 2 pianos, Op.38 (1986)

=== Solo performance tunes ===
- Composition II, "MYO", (Shakuhachi edition /Fl edition), Op. 11 (1981)
- Composition IV, "Holy Dance", (Solo Percussion), Op. 14 (1982)
- Variations for Solo Cello, Op. 16 (1982)
- Mono-morphology I, "FUJYU", (Solo Flute / Solo Shakuhachi), Op. 22 (1983)
- Mono-morphology II, (Solo Guitar), Op. 27 (1983)
- Piano Piece I, Op. 28 (1985)
- Piano Piece II, Op. 30 (1985)
- "AYA", For Solo Koto, Op. 35 (1986)
- Mono-morphology III, For Solo Oboe, Op. 33 (1986)
- Piano Piece III, Op. 36 (1986)

=== Solo singing tunes ===
- Three Song, settings of poem by Chūya Nakahara (Soprano, Piano), Op. 1 (1978)
- "Death and Smile" Poem by Makoto Ooka, (Baritone, Piano), Op. 6 (1980)
- Two songs sung by Prince Karu, (Ten, Pf), Op. 15 (1982)
- "From the Abyss of Death" Poem by Jun Takami, (Vocal, Piano), Op.19 (1982)

=== Chorus tunes ===
- "Celebration for the Dead", (Orch. and Chorus), Op.25 (1983)
- Invention (1985)
