= Roger Kanet =

American political scientist

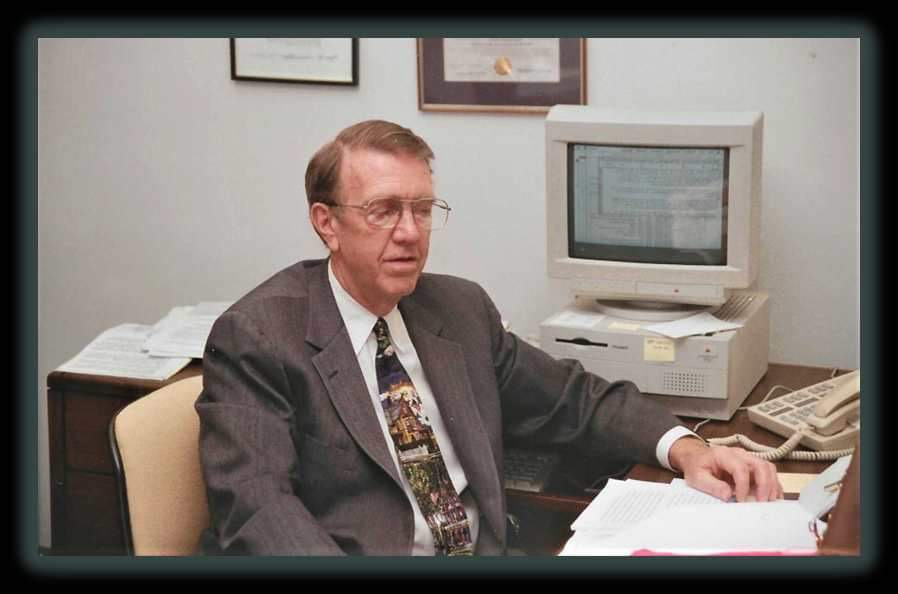
- Roger Kanet
- Born: September 1, 1936; Cincinnati, Ohio, United States
- Other name: Roger Edward Kanet
- Education: Berchmanskolleg, Ph.B. 1960; Xavier University, A.B. 1961; Lehigh University, MA 1963; Princeton University, A.M. 1965; Princeton University, Ph.D. 1966

Roger E. Kanet (born 1936) is professor emeritus of political science and former Associate Vice Chancellor for Academic Affairs (1989-1997), University of Illinois at Urbana-Champaign, and professor emeritus of political science and former Dean of the School of International Studies (1997–2000), University of Miami. Roger Kanet’s dissertation at Princeton, titled “The Soviet Union and Sub-Saharan Africa, 1917–1965,” included Henry Bienen as a member of his dissertation committee.

== Educational career ==
Roger E. Kanet – political scientist, professor emeritus of political science and former Associate Vice Chancellor for Academic Affairs (1989–1997), University of Illinois at Urbana-Champaign, and professor emeritus of political science and former Dean of the School of International Studies (1997–2000), University of Miami. Roger Kanet started his professional career working at the Political Science Department at the University of Kansas in 1966. He went on to work as an instructor at the U.S. Army Command and Staff College in Fort Leavenworth, Kansas. In 1972 he was a senior fellow at Columbia University and then began teaching at the University of Illinois in 1973. Kanet earned full professor rank in 1978. Kanet served as an Associate Vice Chancellor of Academic Affairs at the University of Illinois from 1989 to 1997. Dr. Kanet moved to the University of Miami in 1997. Kanet was dean of the School of International Studies at the University of Miami from 1997 to 2000 until the school was phased out due to budget cuts. He continued on as the director of undergraduate studies for the International Studies Department from 2002 to 2004. In 2014, Kanet transferred from the International Studies Department to the Political Science Department where he stayed until his retirement in 2019. Roger Kanet continued on as professor emeritus at both the University of Miami and at University of Illinois until his death.

== Works ==
Kanet has been the primary editor for 36 edited books and 5 special issues of journals. He has contributed over 155 chapters to edited volumes and published 95 peer-reviewed journal articles. He has also been the general editor for 34 book that appear in series. Recent edited/coedited works include Russian Foreign Policy in the 21st Century, The New Security Environment: The Impact On Russia, Central And Eastern Europe, and A Resurgent Russia and the West: The European Union, NATO and Beyond, "Power, Politics and Confrontation in Eurasia: Foreign Policy in a Contested Region", "Russia, Eurasia and the New Geopolitics of Energy: Confrontation and Consolidation", "Routledge Handbook of Russian Security", "Russia and the World in the Putin Era: From Theory to Reality in Russian Global Strategy" <

== Teaching ==
Kanet supervised many PhD candidates. He has overseen 41 successful dissertations through 2019 and served on another 23 committees. Successful PhD committees Kanet took part in include Donna Bahry, Beverly Barrett, Hanna Samir Kassab, Suzanne Loftus, Dina Moulioukova, Jonathan Rosen, Michael Szanto, and Marcus Thiel.
