= Roh Ogura =

Japanese composer and writer

- Born: January 19, 1916; Kitakyushu, Fukuoka, Japan
- Died: August 26, 1990 (aged 74); Japan
- Other name: 小倉 朗
- Occupations: composer, writer

Roh Ogura (小倉 朗, Ogura Rō; January 19, 1916 – August 26, 1990) was a Japanese composer and writer.

== Biography ==
He was born in Kitakyushu and lived in Tokyo and Kamakura. First he learned French Modern Music under Shiro Fukai and Tomojiro Ikenouchi. Then he studied under Joseph Rosenstock about how to conduct Beethoven's symphonies and he became very interested in German classical music and wrote many symphonies that made him end up being called, "Ogurahms". Then he faced a deadlock and abandoned most of his works.

Gradually, he became very interested in Bartók. Finally he broke a new ground and started writing his original music inspired by Japanese traditional folk songs and old nursery rhymes. He was also gifted writer who published several books. In the late period of his life he was passionate painter too who painted oil paintings.

He was a friend of Minoru Matsuya (1910–1995) and taught his son Midori Matsuya (1943–1994) harmony and composition. He was also a teacher of Hiroaki Zakoji (1958–1987).

== Works ==
- 1937 Sonatine for piano
- 1953 Dance Suite for two pianos
- 1953 Dance Suite for orchestra
- 1954 String Quartet in B
- 1957 Five Movements on Japanese Folk Songs for orchestra
- 1958 Nine Pieces on Children's Songs of Tohoku Region for female chorus a cappella
- 1959 Burlesque for orchestra
- 1960 Sonatine for violin and piano
- 1963 Sonatine for string orchestra
- 1966 Composition I for piano
- 1968 Composition II for piano
- 1968 Symphony in G
- 1971 Concerto for violin and orchestra
- 1972 Composition for string orchestra
- 1975 Composition in F# for orchestra
- 1977 Composition for flute, violin and piano
- 1980 Concerto for violoncello and orchestra

== See also ==
- Japan Composer's Association
