= Symphony No. 2 (Khachaturian) =

1943 symphony by Aram Khachaturian

- by Aram Khachaturian
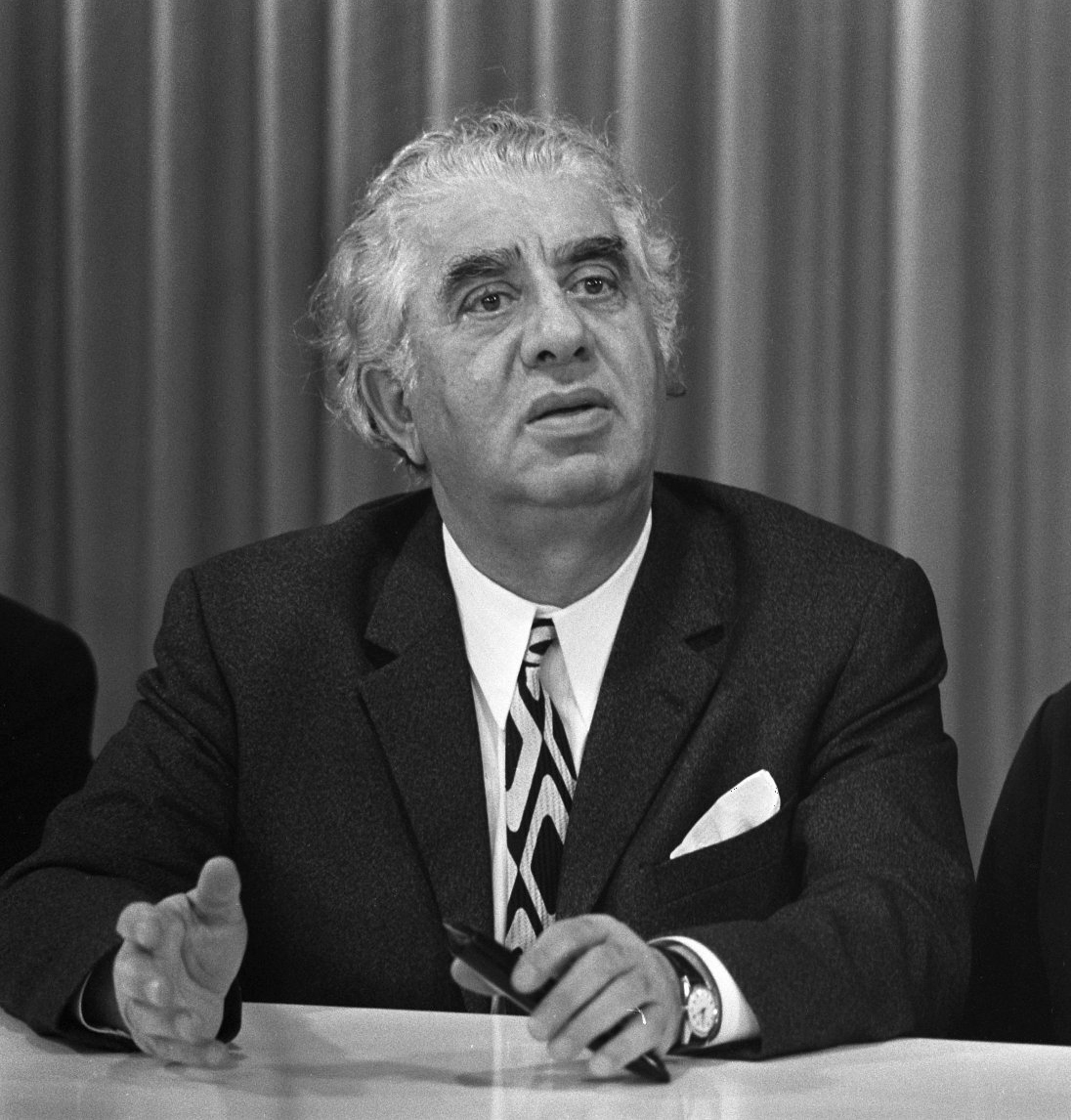
- Aram Khachaturian in 1971
- Key: E minor
- Composed: 1943-44
- Movements: 4

Premiere
- Date: 30 December 1943
- Location: Moscow Conservatory
- Conductor: Boris Khaykin
- Performers: State Symphony Orchestra of the USSR

The Symphony No. 2 in E minor, is one of the Armenian composer Aram Khachaturian's most well-known pieces of music. Completed in 1943, it was nicknamed The Bell or Symphony with Bells by Georgi Khubov for its bell motif that begins and ends the piece. A typical performance lasts about 50 minutes.

== Background ==
Written during the height of the Second World War, Khachaturian's second symphony illustrates the pain that humanity, and the composer himself, felt at the time. The composer described the piece as being "a requiem of wrath, a requiem of protest against war and violence." He also said that it "embodied everything that the people think and feel today." It was written for the 25th anniversary of the Russian Revolution. Critics have said of it: "The Bell is 50 minutes of unrelenting power, and those moments when you think it’s relenting are simply chances for Khachaturian to reload the IS-3 tank that is his orchestra." Although it took Khachaturian only two months to write, the composer would revise it many more times.

The world premiere took place on 30 December 1943 at the Moscow Conservatory, with the State Symphony Orchestra of the USSR and conductor Boris Khaykin. The symphony's United States premiere was given by Leonard Bernstein and a special orchestra as assembled only for the occasion in Carnegie Hall on 13 April 1945. All the musicians performing dedicated their service to the War Orphans of Stalingrad, where the concert's proceeds were donated as well.

== Structure ==
The symphony is scored for piccolo, two flutes, two oboes, English Horn, two clarinets, bass clarinet, two bassoons, four French Horns, three trumpets, three trombones, tuba, timpani, military drum, cymbals, tam-tam, bass drum, bells, xylophone, harp, piano, and strings.

During one of Khachaturian's numerous revisions of the symphony, he swapped places of the inner two movements. Below is the current order:

1. Andante maestoso
2. Allegro risoluto
3. Andante sostenuto
4. Andante mosso – allegro sostenuto. Maestoso

The first movement begins with a bell motif that gives the symphony its nickname, "but it immediately falls into the Technicolor, Armenian-flavored style familiar from Khachaturian's ballet Spartacus," James Reel writes. "A mournful section develops, carried mainly by the strings, and is repeatedly thrown into contrast with the alarming gesture from the movement's opening bars. Despite passages of high drama, the movement ends with a long, gradual fade-out." The Allegro risoluto, sometimes the second and sometimes the third movement, is very rhythmic and forward moving. This movement is much less sinister and more life filled than the other movements. Khachaturian called that life "rest after hard labor." The Andante sostenuto is the most tragic movement of the whole symphony, the most requiem-like part of the piece. Its funeral march atmosphere comes from an Armenian folk melody. Here, the climax is attained with the bell theme. However, the composer wrote of the Andante: "I wish that listeners would not look for concrete illustrations to a series of pictures of superhuman sufferings caused to the Soviet people by the Nazi monsters. But I can't help admitting that while writing the Andante, I saw those horrible sights before my mind's eye." Soviet critic Khubov, who gave the symphony its nickname, wrote of the last movement:

In the fourth movement ... exultation is the feeling. Piercing fanfares open the section. The brass hurls out what is perhaps aptly described as a "Brass Chorus of Glory." Some softer fragments follow with echoings of previous themes. Then, a grand climax is attained as the "bell theme" and the "Brass Chorus" thunder out an idea symbolic of triumph.

== Selected discography ==
- Bucharest Philharmonic Orchestra – George Georgescu. Melodiya, 1958.
- Royal Scottish National Orchestra – Neeme Järvi. Chandos Records, 1992.
- USSR State Symphony Orchestra – Aram Khachaturian. Colosseum, 1953.
- Vienna Philharmonic Orchestra – Aram Khachaturian. Decca London, 1962.
- Moscow Radio Symphony Orchestra – Natan Rakhlin. MGM, 1959.
- Symphony of the Air – Leopold Stokowski. United Artists, 1961 (USLP 0006).
- Armenian Philharmonic Orchestra – Loris Tjeknavorian. ASV, 1993.
- Russian Philharmonic Orchestra - Dmitry Yablonsky. Naxos, 2016
