= Minoru Matsuya =

Japanese jazz pianist (1910–1995)

Minoru Matsuya (松谷穣, Matsuya Minoru, 2 January 1910 – 15 May 1995) was a Japanese jazz pianist, graduated from Tokyo National University of Fine Arts and Music. He was also known as Jo Matsuya or Yuzuru Matsuya. He lived in Kamakura.

He learned piano under renowned Russian pianist Leo Sirota. After World War II, he started playing jazz music in an American base and taught many Japanese jazz vocalists. He was a close friend of Ichiro Fujiyama. He enjoyed performing some works by George Gershwin. He was also a good friend of Roh Ogura and made the first performance of Roh Ogura's work, Sonatine for piano (1937). He was the father of Midori Matsuya.
