= Midori Matsuya =

20th-century Japanese pianist

Midori Matsuya, 松谷翠 (18 March 1943 – 9 January 1994) was a Japanese pianist, graduated from Tokyo National University of Fine Arts and Music, studied under Kichigoro Sato, Noboru Toyomasu, Naoya Fukai and Lay Lev.

His father was a Japanese Jazz pianist, Minoru Matsuya (1910–1995). He taught him how to play the piano since he was a child. He was brought up in an environment to learn both classical and jazz music since his childhood. Also, he learned harmony and composition under Roh Ogura (1916–1990) in Kamakura.

In 1973, he left to Germany to study at Universität der Künste Berlin. In 1975, he returned to Japan and engaged in concert, broadcasting and recording activities.
He was a professor in Nihon University, Music Department. He was a piano teacher of Hiroaki Zakoji (1958–1987).
Composer and vocalist, Fuyuta Matsuya and vocalist, Leo Matsuya are his sons.

He recorded his last CD, Light Colored Album, a short time before his death.
