= Symphony No. 3 (Khachaturian) =

1947 symphony by Aram Khachaturian

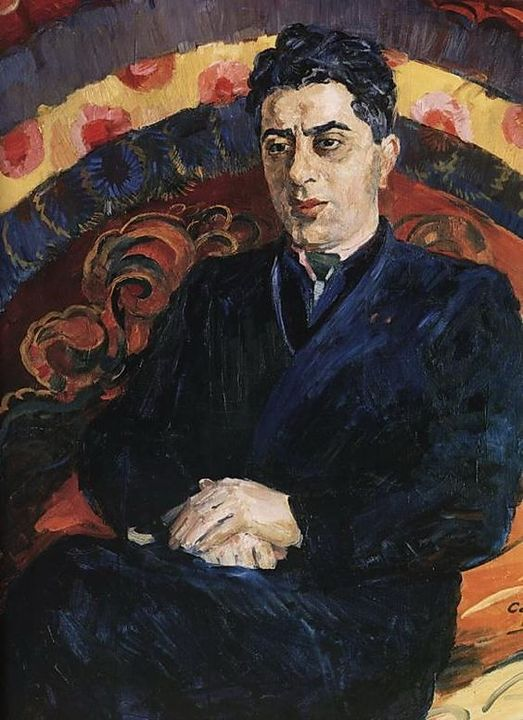
Portrait of Aram Khachaturian, 1944

The Symphony No. 3 by Aram Khachaturian, subtitled Symphony–Poem, was composed in 1947 for the 30th anniversary of the Russian Revolution. Its first public performance was in Leningrad on December 13 by the Leningrad Philharmonic conducted by Yevgeny Mravinsky.

It was Khachaturian's last contribution to the genre. Originally conceived as a symphonic poem, it is a single movement symphony featuring an organ solo and fifteen trumpets conceived as a hymn of praise of the Soviet Union, with Khachaturian saying that he "wanted this work to express the Soviet people’s joy and pride in their great and mighty country". However, the work's raw and strident style, which has been related to the 1920s Soviet constructivist avantgarde, and unorthodox structure and instrumentation dissatisfied the Stalinist cultural authorities, and it was condemned as formalistic in the 1948 Zhdanov decree.

== Discography ==
- Chicago Symphony Orchestra – Leopold Stokowski. RCA Red Seal, 1969.
- Moscow Philharmonic – Kirill Kondrashin, G. Grodberg, organist. Melodiya, 1969.
- Leningrad Philharmonic – Evgeny Mravinsky. Melodiya, 1983.
- Armenian Philharmonic – Loris Tjeknavorian. ASV, 1993.
- BBC Philharmonic – Fedor Glushchenko. Chandos, 1993.
