= Muzykalnaya Akademiya =

Russian music journal

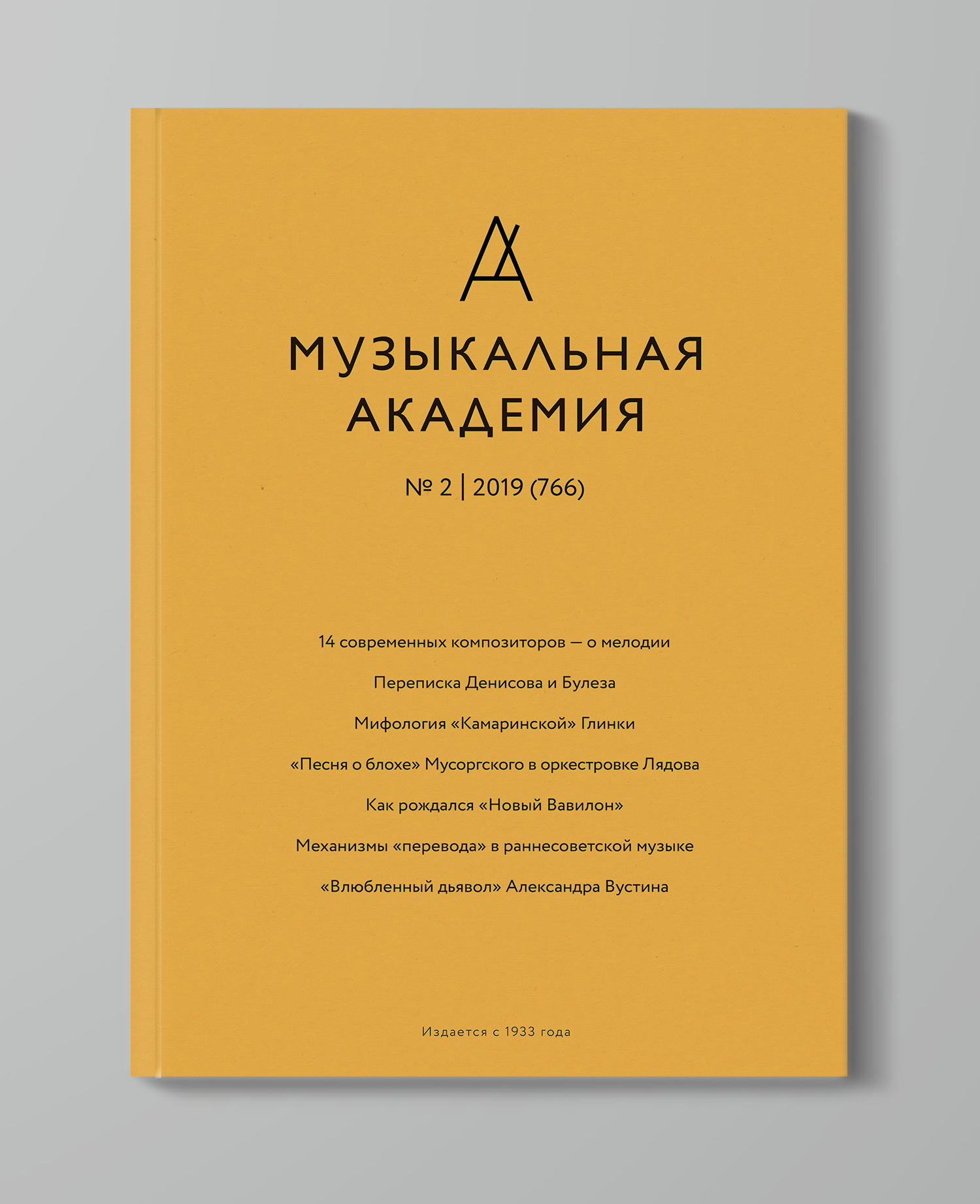
- Discipline: Music theory and analysis
- Language: Russian
- Edited by: Yaroslav Timofeev

Publication details
- Former name: Sovyetskaya Muzyka
- History: 1933–present
- Publisher: Kompozitor (Russia)
- Frequency: Monthly (1933–1991); Quarterly (1992–present)
- Open access: Delayed

Standard abbreviations
- ISO 4: Muzykalnaya Akad.

Indexing
- ISSN: 0869-4516
- OCLC no.: 471060032

Links
- Journal homepage

Muzykalnaya Akademiya (Russian: Музыкальная Академия, lit. 'Musical Academy'), known between 1933 and 1992 as Sovyetskaya Muzyka (Russian: Советская музыка, lit. 'Soviet Music'), is the oldest Russian peer-reviewed academic journal about music.

== History ==
Sovyetskaya Muzyka was established in February 1933 by the Union of Soviet Composers and the State Committee on the Arts. In the first year, the journal was a bimonthly publication 200 pages in length, but after that until World War II the journal was published once a month and was on average 110 pages long.

In 1979, the circulation of the magazine was 21,000 copies. In Soviet times, the journal published articles devoted to the works of domestic and foreign composers, the problems of music science, the development of national and ethnic musical cultures, heritage and education, and questions of the performer skills. The journal also contained various discussion materials, reviews of the concerts and theater premieres, book and music editions, and a chronicle of Soviet and foreign musical life.

Dmitry Kabalevsky was editor-in-chief of Soviet Music from 1940 to 1946.

In 1992, the name of journal was changed to Muzykalnaya Akademiya with new publishers: the Union of Russian Composers, the Russian Ministry of Culture, and Kompozitor.

== Editors-in-chief ==
The following persons are or have been editors-in-chief:

- Nikolai Chelyapov (1933–1937)
- Moses Greenberg (1937–1939)
- Dmitry Kabalevsky (1940–1946)
- Alexander Nikolaev (1947)
- Marian Koval (1948–1952)
- Georgy Hubov (1952–1957)
- Yuri Keldysh (1957–1961)
- Elena Grosheva (1961–1970)
- Yuri Korev (1970–2012)
- Marina Voinova (2012–2018)
- Yaroslav Timofeev (from 2018)
