= List of St. Xavier High School (Ohio) people =

This is a list of notable people associated with St. Xavier High School, a private high school near Cincinnati.

== Notable alumni ==
St. Xavier collectively refers to its graduates as the Long Blue Line, after the school colors and the blue attire worn at graduation. The school's living graduates number over 18,000, as of 2013. Many St. Xavier alumni are well-known figures in the Cincinnati area, and many others have gained recognition nationally and abroad as well. The following list includes those who completed the high school program at St. Xavier College, now Xavier University, between 1869 and 1934:

=== Arts and literature ===
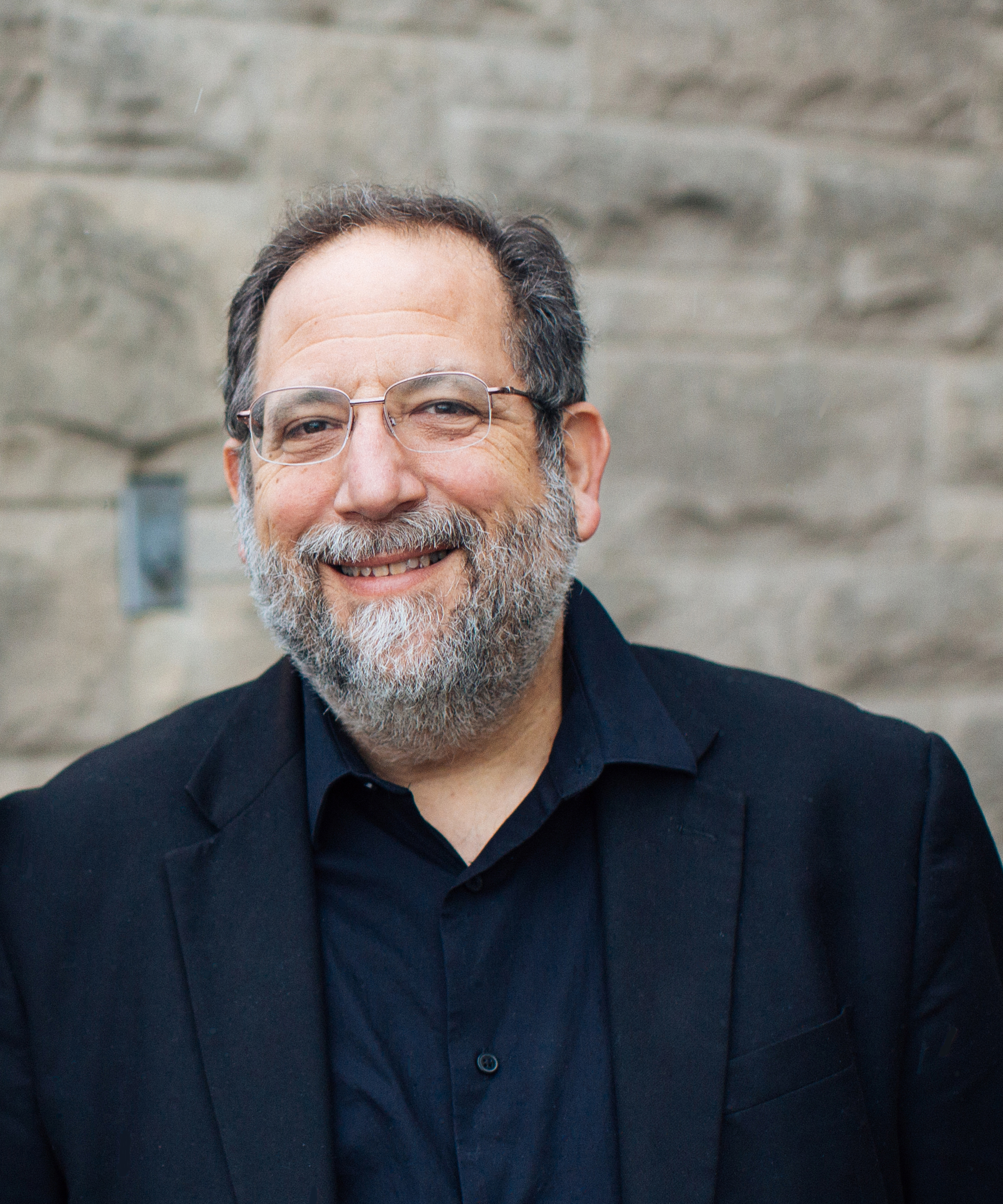
Phil DeGreg

- Kevin Allison (1988) – comedic actor and writer
- David Bell (1988) – suspense author
- Matt Berninger (1989) – singer for The National
- Matthew Betley (1990) – author of thriller novels
- Andy Blankenbuehler (1988) – Broadway dancer and choreographer
- Christopher Bollen (1994) – writer and novelist
- Phil DeGreg (1972) – jazz pianist
- John Diehl (1968) – actor
- Elliott Earls (1984) – graphic designer and performance artist
- Joey Kern (1995) – movie actor, most notably in Cabin Fever (2002), Grind (2003), and Super Troopers
- Kevin Kern (1992) – Broadway performer in Les Misérables and Wicked
- John Knoepfle (1941) – poet, translator, and educator
- Keith O'Brien (1991) – author and journalist
- Patrick Osborne (1999) – Academy Award-winning film animator and director, Paperman and Feast
- David Quammen (1966) – science writer
- Gustave Reininger (1968) – television screenwriter

=== Business ===
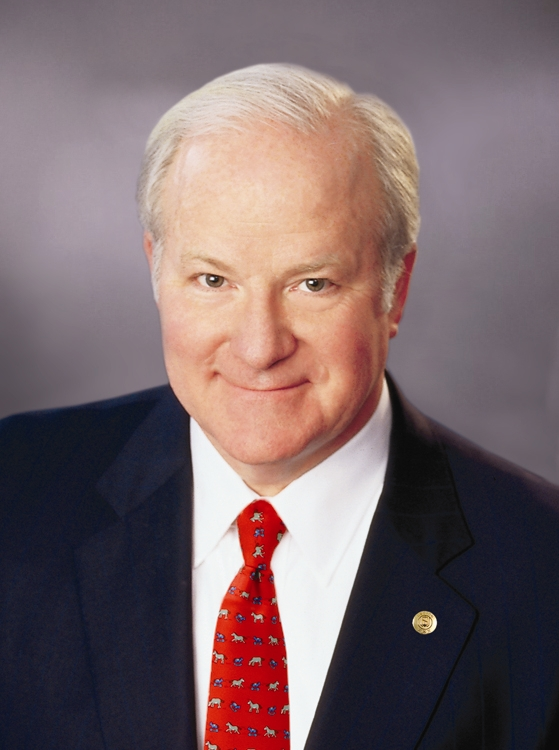
John F. Barrett

- John F. Barrett – CEO of Western & Southern Financial Group
- Anson Frericks (2002) – president of Anheuser-Busch Sales & Distribution and cofounder of Strive Asset Management
- James Michael Lafferty (1981) – CEO of Fine Hygienic Holding and former regional CEO of Procter & Gamble, Coca-Cola, and British American Tobacco
- Charles H. Keating Jr. (1941) – lawyer, real estate developer, banker, and financier, convicted of fraud in the 1989 Savings and Loan scandal, after whom the Keating Five were named
- Joel M. Podolny (1982) – Apple Inc. executive
- Vivek Ramaswamy (2003) – biopharmaceutical entrepreneur
- Chris Wanstrath (2003) – co-founder and former CEO of GitHub

=== Education ===
- Roger Kanet (1954) – political scientist, University of Miami
- Philip J. Pauly (1968) – historian of science and professor at Rutgers University
- Joel M. Podolny (1982) – sociologist and former dean of the Yale School of Management

=== Law ===
- Michael R. Barrett (1969) – United States federal judge, Southern District of Ohio
- Joe Deters (1975) – Ohio Supreme Court Justice
- Patrick F. Fischer (1976) – Ohio Supreme Court justice
- Thomas Geoghegan (1967) – labor lawyer and author
- Joseph Peter Kinneary (1924) – United States federal judge, Southern District of Ohio
- Simon L. Leis Jr. (1952) – Hamilton County prosecutor (1971–1983), common pleas judge (1983–1987), and sheriff (1987–2012)
- Robert O. Lukowsky (1945) – Kentucky Supreme Court justice

=== Medicine ===
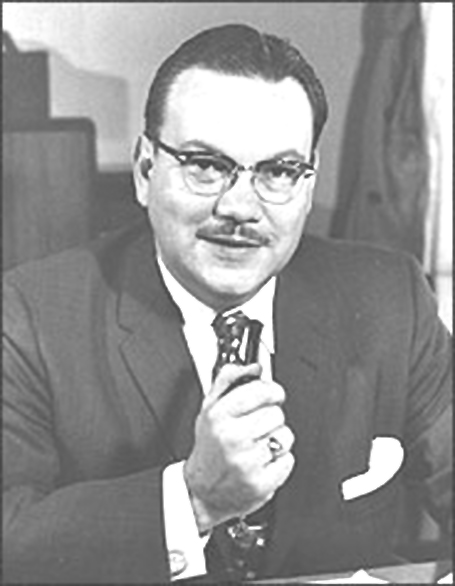
Francis M. Forster

- Francis M. Forster (1930) – neurologist and dean of the Georgetown University School of Medicine
- Branimir Ivan Sikic (1964) – oncologist and cancer pharmacologist, Stanford University School of Medicine

=== Military ===
- Robert Henry Doolan (1935) – Army Air Force navigator and prisoner of war

=== News media ===
- James W. Faulkner (c. 1881) – newspaperman and political writer, "Dean of Ohio Correspondents"; founder of and first president of the Ohio Legislative Correspondents Association
- William J. Keating (1945) – former publisher of The Cincinnati Enquirer and chairman of the board for Gannett Company and the Associated Press
- Joe Kernen (1974) – CNBC news anchor

=== Politics ===
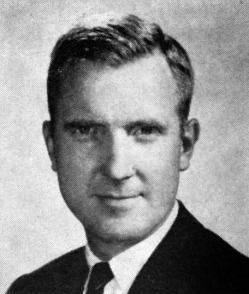
John J. Gilligan

- Jeff Berding (1985) – Cincinnati city councilman (D)
- Tom Brinkman (c. 1975) – Ohio state representative (R – 34), 2001–2008
- Jim Bunning (1949) – U.S. senator (R–KY), 1999–2011; U.S. representative (R–KY), 1987–1999
- John D. Carroll (1973) – Ohio state representative (D–13), 1985
- John Cranley (1992) – mayor of Cincinnati
- Chip Cravaack (1977) – U.S. representative (R–MN), 2011–2013
- John J. Gilligan (1939) – Ohio governor (D), 1971–1975; father of Health and Human Services Secretary Kathleen Sebelius
- Greg J. Holbrock (c. 1924) – U.S. representative (D–OH), 1941–1943
- Eric Kearney (1981) – Ohio state senator (D–9)
- William J. Keating (1945) – U.S. House of Representatives (R–OH), 1971–1974
- Bill Kraus (1965) – gay rights and AIDS activist
- Robert Mecklenborg (1970) – Ohio state representative (R–30), 2007–2011
- Vivek Ramaswamy (2003) – Republican presidential candidate
- Peter Stautberg (1982) – Ohio state representative (R–34)
- Brad Wenstrup (1976) – U.S. representative (R–OH)

=== Religion ===
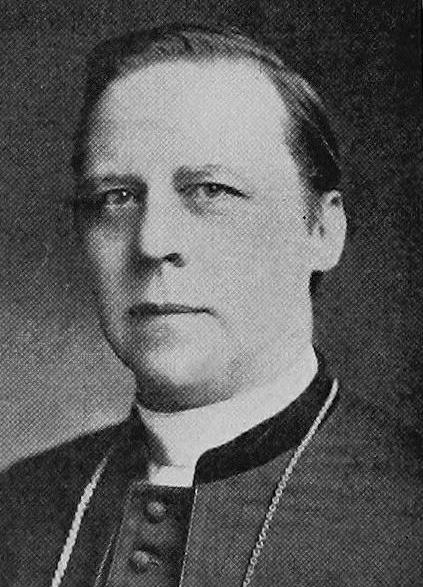
Archbishop Henry K. Moeller

- Rev. Francis Xavier Lasance (c. 1875) – devotional writer
- Most Rev. Henry K. Moeller (c. 1868) – archbishop of Cincinnati
- Most Rev. Anthony John King Mussio (1920) – bishop of Steubenville, Ohio
- Most Rev. Henry Richter (c. 1854) – bishop of Grand Rapids, Michigan

=== Sports ===
==== Baseball ====
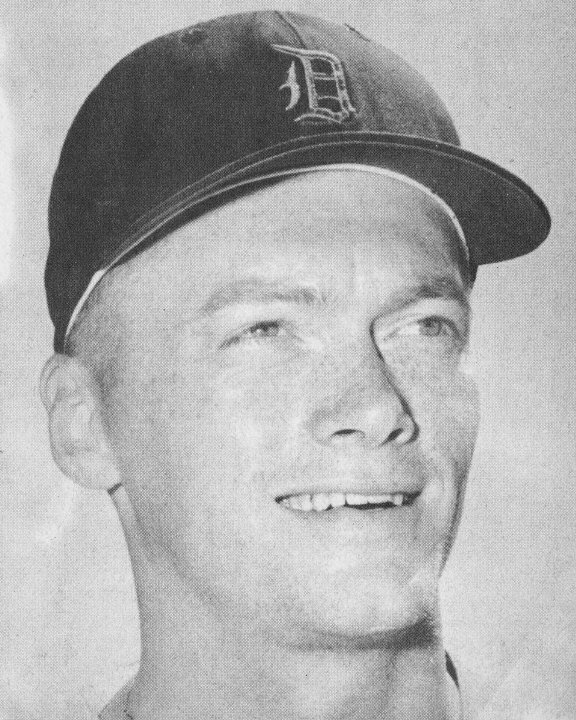
Jim Bunning

- Bob Arnzen (1965) – professional baseball player
- Neal Brady (c. 1915) – pitcher for the New York Yankees and Cincinnati Reds
- Jim Bunning (1949) – Hall of Fame professional baseball player
- Johnny Hodapp (1920s) – professional baseball player, Cleveland Indians
- Chris Sexton (1989) – professional baseball player, Cincinnati Reds
- Bill Sweeney (1904) – professional baseball player, Boston Doves
- Chris Welsh (1973) – broadcaster and former professional baseball player

==== Basketball ====
- Bob Arnzen (1965) – professional basketball player
- Brad Loesing (2008) – professional German basketball player
- Chris Mack (1988) – head men's basketball coach, College of Charleston
- Mike Mathis – professional basketball referee
- Charles Wolf (1944) – former professional basketball coach

==== Football ====
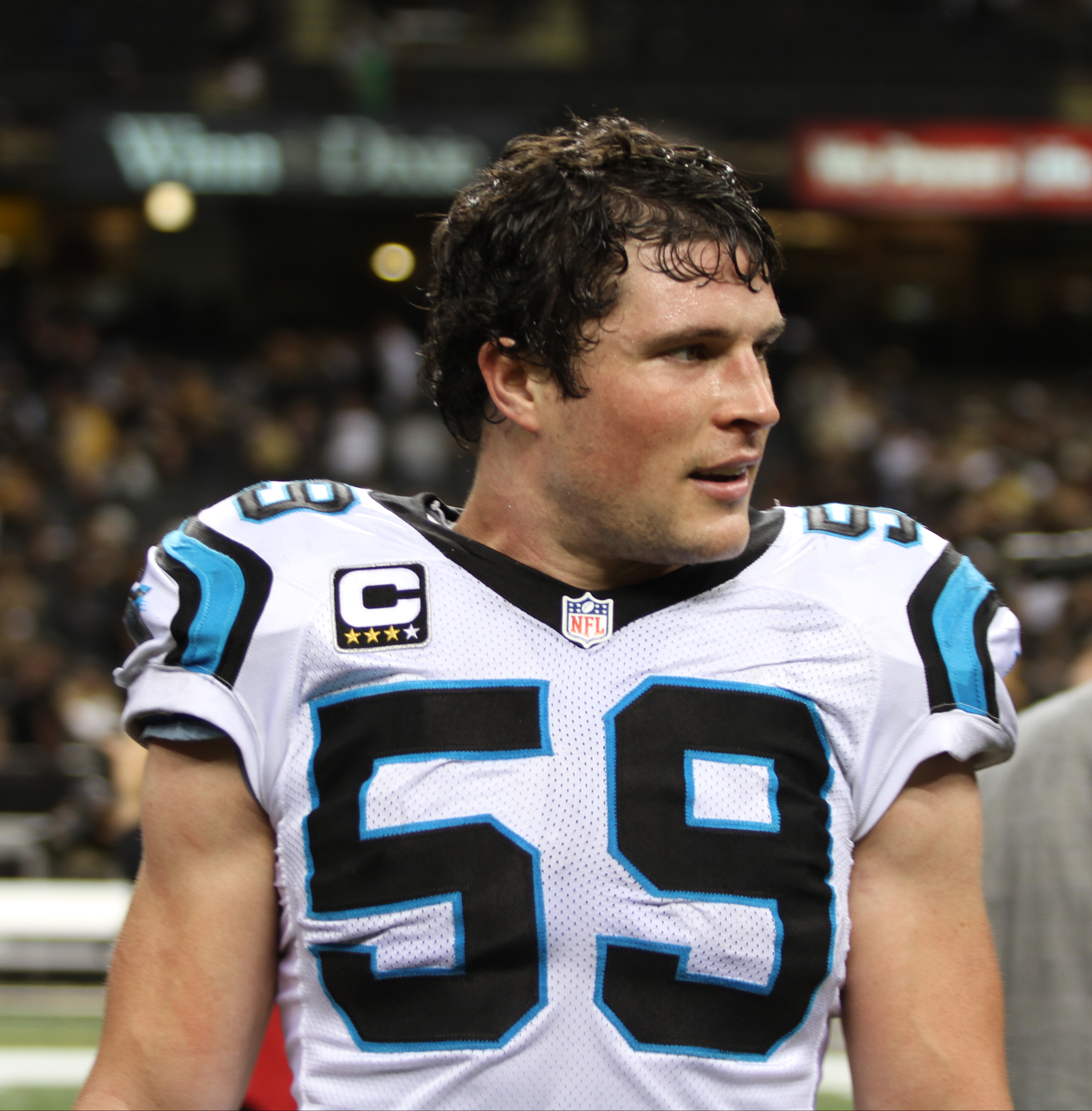
Luke Kuechly

- Alex Albright (2006) – professional football linebacker, Dallas Cowboys
- Bryson Albright (2012) – professional football linebacker, Cincinnati Bengals
- Dana Bible (1972) – football coach, NC State Wolfpack
- Rocky Boiman (1998) – broadcast college football analyst, former professional football player and Super Bowl XLI champion, Tennessee Titans
- Sean Clifford (2017) – quarterback for the Cincinnati Bengals
- Steven Daniels (2011) – professional football linebacker, Washington Commanders
- Sean Duggan (2011) – professional football coach and defensive assistant, Green Bay Packers
- Greg Frey (1986) – professional football player
- Clint Haslerig (1970) – professional football player
- Justin Hilliard (2015) – professional football linebacker
- Melvin Johnson (1990) – professional football player, Tampa Bay Buccaneers and Kansas City Chiefs
- Max Klare (2022) – college football player, Ohio State Buckeyes
- Luke Kuechly (2009) – former professional football linebacker, Carolina Panthers
- Lemar Marshall (1995) – professional football player, Cincinnati Bengals
- Art Mergenthal (1939) – professional football player and 1945 NFL champion, Cleveland Rams
- Tom O'Brien (1966) – head football coach, NC State Wolfpack
- Brian Parker II (2022) – professional football player, Cincinnati Bengals
- Hal Pennington (1930) – general manager and head coach, Cincinnati Bengals (second AFL)
- Dominic Randolph (2005) – Arena Football League quarterback
- George Ratterman (1944) – professional football player
- Pat Ross (2001) – professional football player, Seattle Seahawks
- Greg Scruggs (2008) – professional football tight end, New England Patriots

==== Golf ====
- Jim Herman (1996) – professional golfer

==== Rowing ====
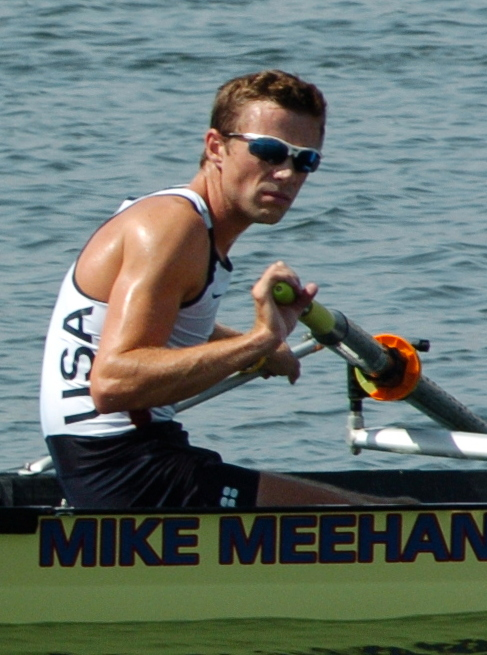
Pat Todd

- Pat Todd (1998) – semifinalist in the men's lightweight coxless four rowing event at the 2004 Summer Olympics and the same event at the 2008 Summer Olympics

==== Soccer ====
- Jeff Berding (1985) – president of FC Cincinnati

==== Swimming ====
- Jayme Cramer (2001) – bronze medalist in swimming at the 2003 Pan American Games and silver medalist at the 2006 FINA Short Course World Championships
- Joe Hudepohl (1992) – gold medalist at the 1992 and 1996 Olympic Games; swimming world record holder
- Charles Keating III (1973) – swimmer at the 1976 Olympic Games

==== Volleyball ====
- Steven Kehoe (2006) – professional volleyball player

== Recipients of honorary diplomas ==
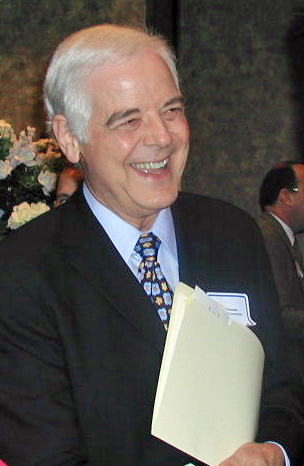
Nick Clooney

On at least two occasions, St. Xavier has awarded an honorary diploma to a former student who did not graduate with his class. In 2007, journalist and politician Nick Clooney was awarded an honorary diploma for the class of 1952. The same year, Louis Schipper was awarded an honorary diploma for the class of 1946, after dropping out of the school in 1943 to serve as a Seabee in World War II.

== Other notable students ==
- Bo Donaldson (1964–1967) – musician
- Paris Johnson Jr. (2016–2018) – American football offensive tackle, Ohio State Buckeyes
- Al Schottelkotte (late 1940s) – news anchor
- Admiral Schlei (1890s) – baseball player
- Tom Shah – CIA officer killed in 1998 United States embassy bombings
- Jim Tarbell – restaurateur and politician

== Notable faculty and staff ==
- Rev. Lawrence Biondi, S.J. (French and Latin teacher, 1965–1967) – president of Saint Louis University 1987–2013
- John Dromo (coach at large, 1942–1947) – Louisville Cardinals men's basketball head coach
- Michael Gallagher (Jesuit scholastic teaching English) – author and translator of Japanese literature
- Robert S. Johnston (classics, English, and mathematics teacher, 1901–1902) – president of Saint Louis University
- Urban Meyer (defensive back football coaching intern, 1985) – former Ohio State Buckeyes football head coach
- Dan J. Savage (football and baseball coach, 1926–1931) – previously Saint Louis Billikens football, basketball, and baseball coach
- Rev. Robert A. Wild, S.J. (Latin, Greek, and speech and debate teacher, 1964–1967) – president of Marquette University

== See also ==
- Xavier University § Notable alumni
- Xavier University § Notable faculty
