= Long Blue Line =

The phrase "Long Blue Line" may refer to:

== Collegiate alumni ==
- Marietta College, Marietta, Ohio
- United States Air Force Academy, Colorado
- United States Coast Guard Academy, New London, Connecticut

== Secondary school alumni ==
- St. Xavier High School, Cincinnati, Ohio (see List of St. Xavier High School (Ohio) people)

== Other uses ==
- An episode in season 6 of Cold Case, an American television series
- The Troopers Drum and Bugle Corps

== See also ==
- The Thin Blue Line (disambiguation)
- Blue Line (disambiguation)
- The Long Gray Line
