= Sio Gene Therapies =

American pharmaceutical company

Sio Gene Therapies, Inc.
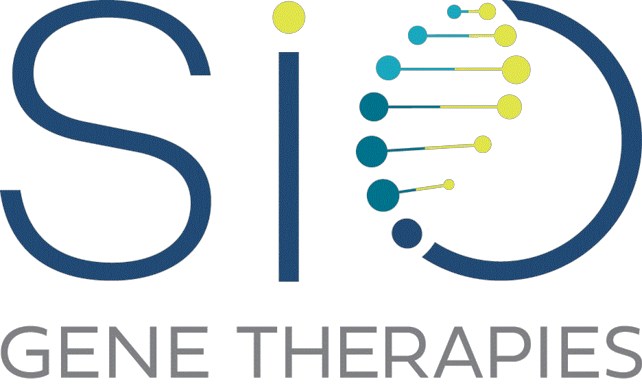
- Formerly: Axovant Gene Therapies
- Type: Public
- Traded as: Nasdaq: SIOX
- Industry: Biopharmaceutical
- Founded: October 2014; 12 years ago
- Founder: Vivek Ramaswamy
- Defunct: April 5, 2023
- Headquarters: New York City
- Key people: Pavan Cheruvu (CEO)
- Owner: Roivant Sciences (25%)
- Website: siogtx.com

Sio Gene Therapies, Inc. (formerly known as Axovant Gene Therapies) was a clinical-stage pharmaceutical company that developed gene therapies to treat neurological disorders. The company was headquartered in New York City and was incorporated in Basel, Switzerland. The company was founded by Vivek Ramaswamy in October 2014 as a wholly owned subsidiary of Roivant Sciences, which was itself founded in May 2014. Sio Gene Therapies repeatedly announced the potential release of medications that did not pass pharmaceutical tests; it is accused of securities fraud.

== History ==
In December 2014, Axovant acquired rights to the drug intepirdine from GlaxoSmithKline. Intepirdine is a potential add-on treatment to donepezil for patients with Alzheimer's disease and patients with dementia with Lewy bodies. GlaxoSmithKline had sold the rights to Axovant for only $5 million, a very small amount in the pharmaceutical industry, because four clinical trials had resulted in failure. Intepirdine was Axovant's only product.

Although no clinical development took place, Axovant held its IPO in June 2015 and raised $315 million, the largest biotech IPO ever, based on new phase IIB trials that were more promising. The lock-up period against reselling stock was reduced to an unusually short 90 days for hedge funds that showed interest in the IPO.

In July 2017, Axovant announced that the results of a phase III trial indicated that the drug was not effective for treatment of Alzheimer's disease. Since investors noticed Axovant could not release the product, its stock lost 75 percent of its value in a single day. Because of this incident, the company has been accused of developing a pump-and-dump scheme.

The company also entered clinical trials for dementia with Lewy bodies, which were unsuccessful as well. Consequently, Axovant announced in 2018 that it has discontinued development of intepirdine.

As of 2016 Axovant was also developing a second compound, nelotanserin. Axovant acquired global rights to nelotanserin from its former parent, Roivant, which had previously bought those rights from Arena Pharmaceuticals and intended to develop it as a treatment for Lewy body dementia. However, in late 2018, the company announced that nelotanserin failed to meet its primary endpoint of reducing the frequency of REM sleep behavior disorder (RBD) episodes in a small Phase 2 clinical trial for the treatment of RBD in LBD patients and that therefore its development would be discontinued.

In 2016 Axovant partnered with NFL broadcaster Solomon Wilcots to raise awareness of Alzheimer's clinical trials That year it also sponsored performances in several U.S. cities of "Forget Me Not," a play by Garrett Davis about an African American family coping with Alzheimer's disease, in order to raise awareness of its clinical trials in that community, because African Americans are twice as likely to develop Alzheimer's disease as white Americans, but have been historically underrepresented in clinical research studies.

Axovant logo from 2014 to 2020

In 2017, David Hung joined the company as CEO.

In 2018, David Hung resigned and Pavan Cheruvu became the new CEO.

In December 2018, Axovant added two gene therapy programs to treat GM1 gangliosidosis and Tay–Sachs and Sandhoff diseases.

In June 2019, Axovant announced a strategic partnership with Yposkesi, a leading Contract Development and Manufacturing Organization, to expand Axovant's gene therapy manufacturing capacity.

In August 2019, Axovant was preparing to report data from all three clinical-stage programs in the fourth quarter of 2019, including results from the second cohort of the AXO-LENTI-PD study and data from additional children dosed with AXO-AAV-GM1 and AXO-AAV-GM2.

In November 2020, Axovant rebranded as Sio Gene Therapies.

On April 5, 2023, the shareholders of Sio Gene Therapies voted to liquidate and dissolve the company.
