= Vivek Ramaswamy =

American entrepreneur (born 1985)

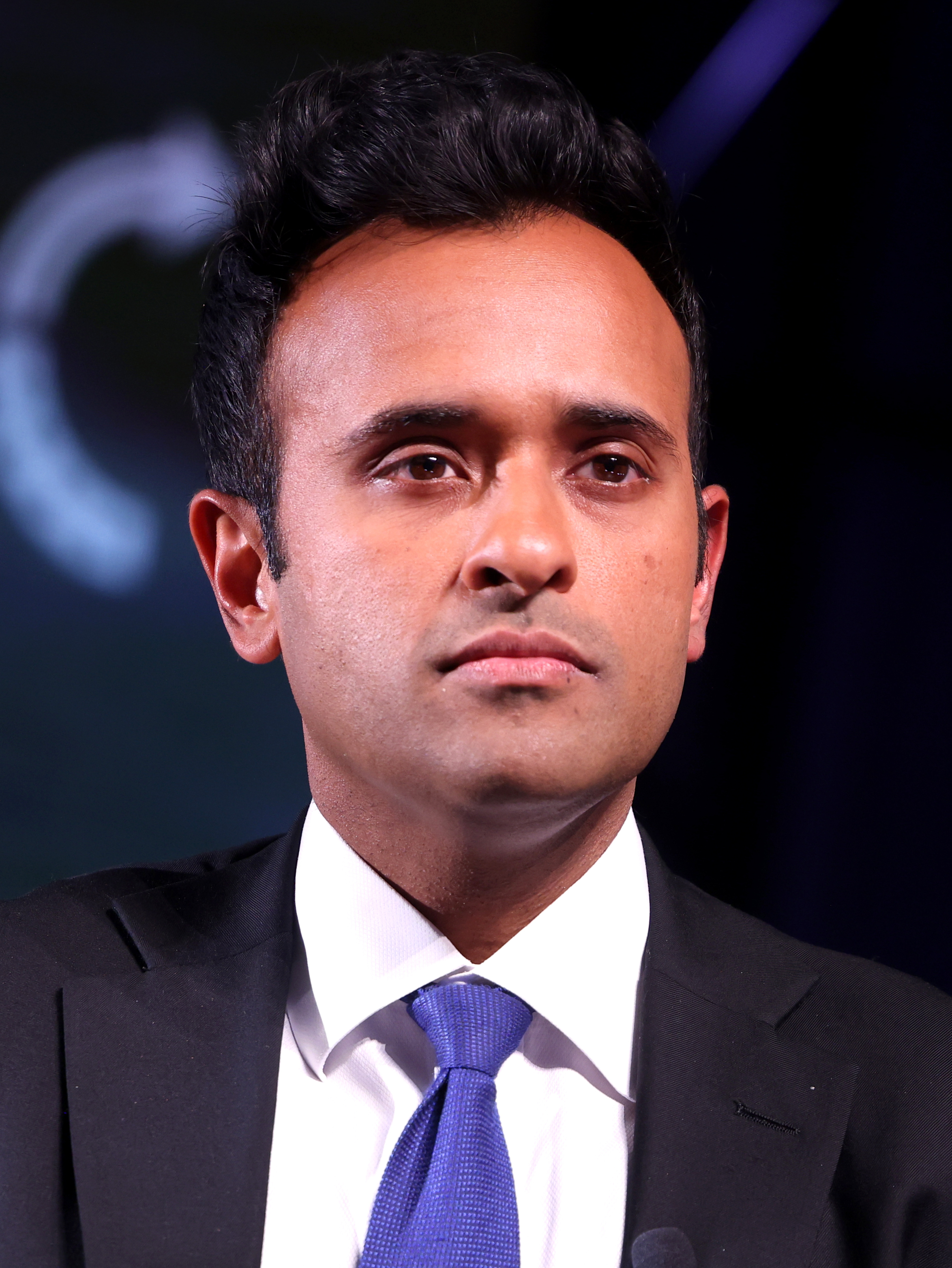
- Ramaswamy in 2026
- Born: Vivek Ganapathy Ramaswamy; August 9, 1985 (age 41); Cincinnati, Ohio, U.S.
- Education: Harvard University (BA); Yale University (JD)
- Political party: Republican
- Spouse: Apoorva Tewari (m. 2015)
- Children: 3
- Ramaswamy's voice Ramaswamy on U.S. demographics and his presidential candidacy. Recorded April 27, 2023
- Website: Official website

Vivek Ganapathy Ramaswamy (Note: Pronounced /vɪˈveɪk ɡəˈnɑːpəθi ˌrɑːməˈswɑːmi/ vih-VAYK gə-NAH-pə-thee RAH-mə-SWAH-mee) (born August 9, 1985) is an American billionare businessman, entrepreneur, and former political candidate. He founded Roivant Sciences, a biotechnological pharmaceutical company, in 2014 and was its chief executive officer until 2021. Ramaswamy was a candidate in the 2024 Republican primaries, but withdrew his bid and endorsed Donald Trump. He was the Republican nominee in the 2026 Ohio gubernatorial election, losing to Democratic nominee Amy Acton.

Ramaswamy was born in Cincinnati, Ohio, to Indian immigrant parents. He earned a bachelor's degree in biology from Harvard College in 2007 and a Juris Doctor from Yale Law School in 2013. He worked at a hedge fund before founding Roivant Sciences and co-founded an investment firm, Strive Asset Management, in 2022. Forbes estimated Ramaswamy's net worth to be $2.3 billion in September 2026, derived primarily from his biotech and financial businesses.

Ramaswamy’s tenure at Roivant Sciences, including its development of the Alzheimer’s drug candidate intepirdine, which failed in phase 3 trials, was criticized by political opponents during his campaigns. During the 2026 Ohio gubernatorial campaign, an advertisement from Ramaswamy’s campaign featuring Amy Acton's estranged mother drew criticism from Acton and from fellow Republicans, including Governor Mike DeWine.

Initially a libertarian and president of the Harvard Political Union, Ramaswamy described himself as apolitical for a period until 2020, when he supported Trump in the 2020 presidential election. In 2021, Ramaswamy wrote his first book, Woke Inc, and appeared on cable networks arguing against left-wing and "woke" policies.

== Early life ==
Vivek Ganapathy Ramaswamy was born in Cincinnati, Ohio, on August 9, 1985, to parents from India. His father, Vadakanchery Ganapathy Ramaswamy, a graduate of the National Institute of Technology Calicut, worked as an engineer for General Electric, and his mother, Geetha Ramaswamy, a graduate of the Mysore Medical College & Research Institute, worked as a geriatric psychiatrist for Merck and Schering-Plough. His parents are from the Palakkad district in Kerala, where their Palakkad Iyer family had an ancestral Agraharam home.

Ramaswamy was raised in Ohio. Growing up, Ramaswamy often attended a local Hindu temple in Dayton with his family. His conservative Christian piano teacher, who gave him private lessons from elementary through high school, also influenced his social views. He spent many summer vacations traveling to India with his parents. He played tennis in his youth, and was ranked No. 48 in the Midwest in the under-16 boys' regional rankings in 2001 by the United States Tennis Association.

=== Education ===
Ramaswamy attended public schools through eighth grade. He then attended Cincinnati's St. Xavier High School, a Catholic school affiliated with the Jesuit order, graduating as valedictorian in 2003. Ramaswamy received a Bachelor of Arts (summa cum laude) in biology from Harvard University in 2007. He was a member of Phi Beta Kappa. At Harvard, he gained a reputation as a brash and confident libertarian. He was a member of the Harvard Political Union, becoming its president. He told The Harvard Crimson that he considered himself a contrarian who loved to debate. While in college, he performed Eminem covers and libertarian-themed rap music under the stage name and alter ego "Da Vek", and was an intern for Amaranth Advisors, a hedge fund, and investment bank Goldman Sachs. He wrote his senior thesis on the ethical questions raised by creating human-animal chimeras, earning him a Bowdoin Prize.

In 2011, Ramaswamy was a recipient of the Paul & Daisy Soros Fellowships for New Americans. Ramaswamy later said that by the time he attended Yale Law School, he was already wealthy from his activities in the finance, pharmaceutical, and biotech industries; he said in 2023 that he had a net worth of around $15 million before graduating from law school. At Yale Law School, he befriended future vice president of the United States JD Vance. He received a Juris Doctor degree from Yale Law School in 2013. In a 2023 interview, Ramaswamy said that he was a member of the campus Jewish intellectual discussion society Shabtai while a law student.

== Business career ==
=== Early career ===
In 2007, Ramaswamy and Travis May co-founded Campus Venture Network, which published a private social networking website for university students who aspired to launch a business. The company was sold to the nonprofit Ewing Marion Kauffman Foundation in 2009. Ramaswamy worked at the hedge fund QVT Financial from 2007 to 2014. He was a partner and co-managed the firm's biotech portfolio. QVT's biotech investments under Ramaswamy included stakes in Palatin Technologies, Concert Pharmaceuticals, Pharmasset, and Martin Shkreli's Retrophin. In a 2023 speech and in his book Woke Inc., Ramaswamy called Shkreli, whose company had greatly increased the cost of a life-saving drug, both "brilliant" and a pathological liar. He criticized the U.S. Department of Justice for prosecuting Shkreli, calling his fraud a victimless crime.

=== Roivant Sciences and subsidiaries ===
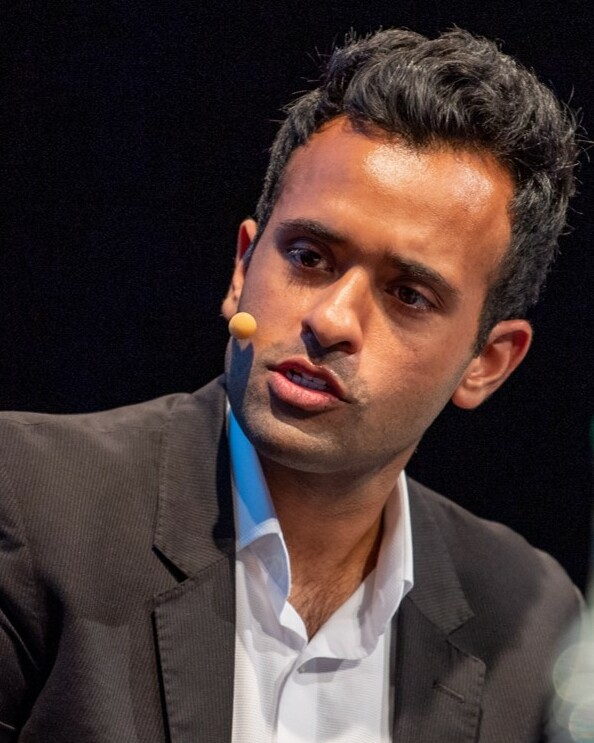
Ramaswamy in 2017

In 2014, Ramaswamy founded the biotechnology firm Roivant Sciences; the "Roi" in the company's name refers to return on investment. The company was incorporated in Bermuda, a tax haven, and received almost $100 million in start-up capital from QVT and other investors, including RA Capital Management, Visium Asset Management, and the hedge fund managers D. E. Shaw & Co. and Falcon Edge Capital. Roivant's strategy was to purchase patents from larger pharmaceutical companies for drugs that had not yet been successfully developed, and then bring them to market. The company created numerous subsidiaries, including Dermavant (focused on dermatology), Urovant (focused on urological disease), and China-based Sinovant and Cytovant, both focused on the Asian market.

In 2015, Ramaswamy raised $360 million for the Roivant subsidiary Axovant Sciences in an attempt to market intepirdine as a drug for Alzheimer's disease. In December 2014, Axovant purchased the patent for intepirdine from GlaxoSmithKline (where the drug had failed four previous clinical trials) for $5 million, a small sum in the industry. Ramaswamy appeared on the cover of Forbes in 2015, and said his company would "be the highest return on investment endeavor ever taken up in the pharmaceutical industry." Before new clinical trials began, he engineered Axovant's initial public offering (IPO); it became a "Wall Street darling" and raised $315 million. The company's market value initially soared to almost $3 billion, although at the time it only had eight employees, including Ramaswamy's brother and mother. Ramaswamy took a massive payout after selling a portion of his shares in Roivant to Viking Global Investors. He claimed more than $37 million in capital gains in 2015. Ramaswamy said his company would be the "Berkshire Hathaway of drug development" and touted the drug as a "tremendous" opportunity that "could help millions" of patients, prompting some criticism that he was overpromising.

In September 2017, the company announced that intepirdine had failed in its large clinical trial. The company's value plunged; it lost 75% in one day and continued to decline afterward. Shareholders who lost money included various institutional investors, such as the pension fund of the California State Teachers' Retirement System. Ramaswamy was insulated from much of Axovant's losses because he held his stake through Roivant. The company abandoned intepirdine. In 2018, Ramaswamy said he had no regrets about how the company handled the drug. In subsequent years, he said he regretted the outcome but was annoyed by criticism of the company. Axovant thereafter attempted to reinvent itself as a gene therapy company, and dissolved in 2023.

In 2017, Roivant partnered with CITIC Private Equity of the Chinese state-owned CITIC Group to form Sinovant. In 2017, Ramaswamy struck a deal with Masayoshi Son in which SoftBank invested $1.1 billion in Roivant. In 2019, Roivant sold its stake in five subsidiaries (or "vants"), including Enzyvant, to Sumitomo Dainippon Pharma; Ramaswamy made $175 million in capital gains from the sale. The deal also gave Sumitomo Dainippon a 10% stake in Roivant. While campaigning for the presidency, Ramaswamy called himself a "scientist" and said, "I developed a number of medicines."

In January 2021, Ramaswamy stepped down as CEO of Roivant Sciences and assumed the role of executive chairman. In 2021, after he resigned as CEO, Roivant was listed on the Nasdaq via a reverse merger with Montes Archimedes Acquisition Corp, a special purpose acquisition vehicle. In February 2023, Ramaswamy stepped down as chair of Roivant to focus on his presidential campaign. Ramaswamy remains the sixth-largest shareholder of Roivant, retaining a 7.17% stake. During Ramaswamy's time running Roivant the company had never been profitable.

=== Roivant Social Ventures ===
In 2020, when Ramaswamy was CEO of Roivant Sciences, the company established a nonprofit social-impact arm, Roivant Social Ventures (RSV), with his support. An earlier iteration of RSV, the Roivant Foundation, was created in 2018. Although Ramaswamy's presidential campaign centered on opposing corporate diversity, equity, and inclusion (DEI) and environmental, social, and corporate governance (ESG) initiatives, RSV worked in support of pro-DEI and ESG initiatives, including promoting health equity and diversity within the biopharma and biotech industries. While campaigning, Ramaswamy has downplayed his role in creating and overseeing RSV.

=== Strive Asset Management ===
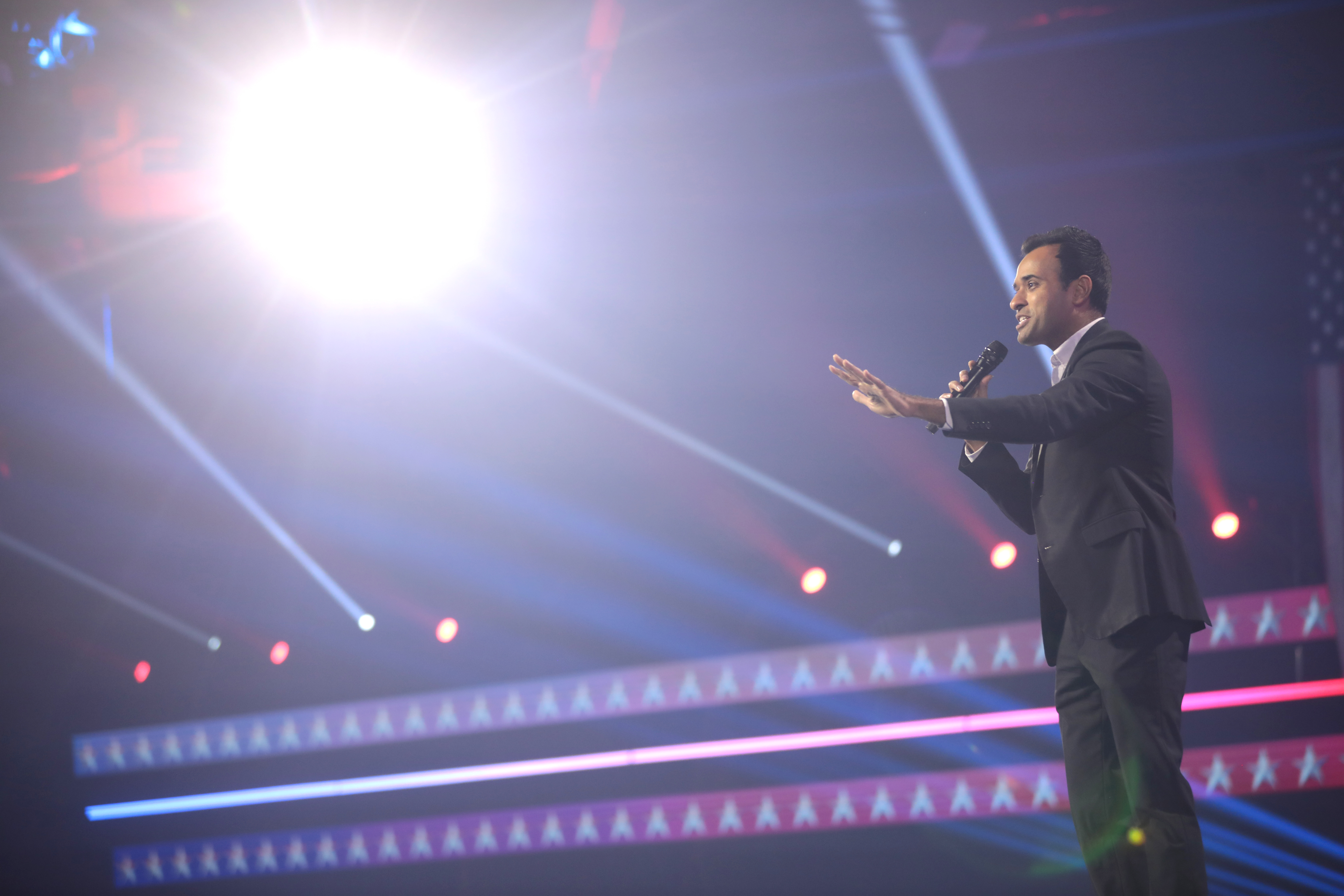
Ramaswamy speaking in 2022

In early 2022, together with his high school friend Anson Frericks, Ramaswamy co-founded Strive Asset Management, a Columbus, Ohio-based asset management firm. The firm raised about $20 million from outside investors, including Peter Thiel, JD Vance, and Bill Ackman. Strive has branded itself as "anti-woke" and its funds as "anti-ESG"; Ramaswamy has said that the largest asset managers, such as BlackRock, State Street, and Vanguard, mix business with ESG politics to the detriment of their funds' investors.

Pension fund managers take account of ESG in the assessment of long-term risk, including climate risks, when making portfolio decisions. Ramaswamy has crusaded against ESG and emphasizes the doctrine of shareholder primacy, famously articulated by Milton Friedman. In his book Woke, Inc.: Inside Corporate America's Social Justice Scam and elsewhere, he has depicted private corporations' socially conscious investing as simultaneously ineffective and the greatest threat to American society. He published a second book, Nation of Victims: Identity Politics, the Death of Merit, and the Path Back to Excellence, in September 2022, a few months before announcing his presidential candidacy.

Strive's flagship fund, the exchange-traded fund DRLL, launched in 2022 as an "anti-woke" energy sector index fund. Ramaswamy said that Strive would push energy companies to drill for more oil, frack for more natural gas, and "do whatever allows them to be most successful over the long run without regard to political, social, cultural or environmental agendas." In October 2022, Ramaswamy held closed-door meetings with South Carolina lawmakers in a session arranged by state treasurer Curtis Loftis; during the meetings, Ramaswamy pitched Strive to manage South Carolina pension funds. In June 2023, after The Post and Courier reported on the meetings, the sessions were criticized as a form of unregistered lobbying; Ramaswamy's campaign manager denied any impropriety.

Ramaswamy was Strive's executive chairman, before resigning in February 2023 to focus on his presidential campaign. In August 2026, a federal judge declined to dismiss a whistleblower lawsuit against Ramaswamy stemming from his tenure at Strive. Former Strive executive Joyce Rosely alleged that Ramaswamy and other executives pressured her to engage in securities-law violations and that she was fired after objecting to the alleged conduct. The ruling allowed her whistleblower retaliation claims to proceed, without determining whether the alleged securities-law violations occurred.

=== Other ventures ===
In 2020, Ramaswamy co-founded Chapter Medicare, a Medicare navigation platform. He participated in the Ohio COVID-19 Response Team, working with the lieutenant governor as an adviser on COVID-19 and regularly participating in Ohio's daily virus briefings. He was chairman of OnCore Biopharma, a position he maintained at Tekmira Pharmaceuticals when the two companies merged in March 2015. He also was chair of the board of Arbutus Biopharma, a Canadian firm.

In May 2024, Ramaswamy acquired a 7.7% stake in BuzzFeed, later increased to 8.4%, making him the second-largest Class A shareholder in the company. Soon after the acquisition, he sent a letter to the company's board of directors, in which he suggested they hire conservative pundits such as Candace Owens, Tucker Carlson, and Bill Maher, as well as three "high-profile directors, with strong track business records in new media" whom he knew.

== Political career ==
=== Early political involvement ===
Ramaswamy said that he voted for Michael Badnarik, the Libertarian Party presidential nominee in 2004, but did not vote in the presidential elections in 2008, 2012, or 2016. He described himself as apolitical during this period. He supported Donald Trump in the 2020 election. In November 2021, Ramaswamy registered to vote in Franklin County, Ohio, as "unaffiliated", but described himself as a Republican. Ramaswamy has made political contributions to both Democrats and Republicans. In 2016, he donated $2,700 to the campaign of Dena Grayson, a Florida Democrat running for Congress. From 2020 to 2023, he donated $30,000 to the Ohio Republican Party. Ramaswamy considered running in the 2022 U.S. Senate election in Ohio.

=== 2024 presidential campaign ===
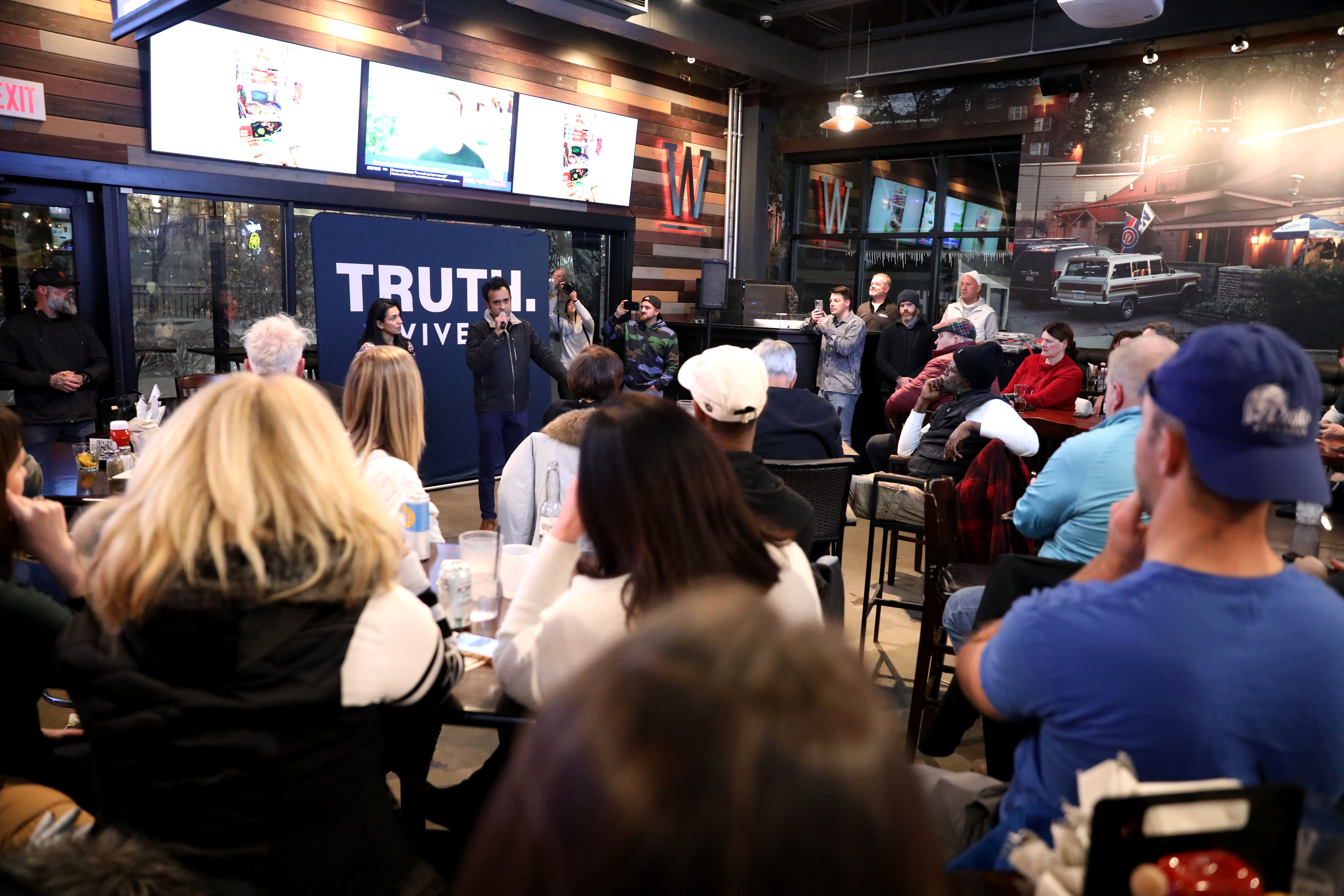
Ramaswamy speaks with supporters at a town hall in Des Moines, Iowa.

On February 21, 2023, Ramaswamy declared his candidacy for the Republican nomination for president of the United States in 2024 on Tucker Carlson Tonight. He publicly released 20 years of his individual income tax returns and called upon his rivals in the primary to do the same. His fortune had made up the vast majority of his campaign's fundraising. From February to July 2023, Ramaswamy loaned his campaign more than $15 million; his campaign ended the second quarter of 2023 with about $9 million in cash on hand. His fundraising lagged far behind Donald Trump's and Ron DeSantis's, but exceeded most of the other Republican primary candidates'.

During his campaign for the Republican presidential nomination, Ramaswamy sought to appeal to evangelical Christian right and Christian nationalist voters, an important part of the Republican base, some of whom are reluctant or unwilling to support a non-Christian presidential candidate such as Ramaswamy, who is Hindu. In campaign stops and interviews, Ramaswamy had criticized secularism, saying that the U.S. was founded on Christian values or Judeo-Christian values; that he shares those values; and that he believes in one God. While campaigning, Ramaswamy called himself an "unapologetic American nationalist"; he often attacked DeSantis but avoided directly criticizing Trump.

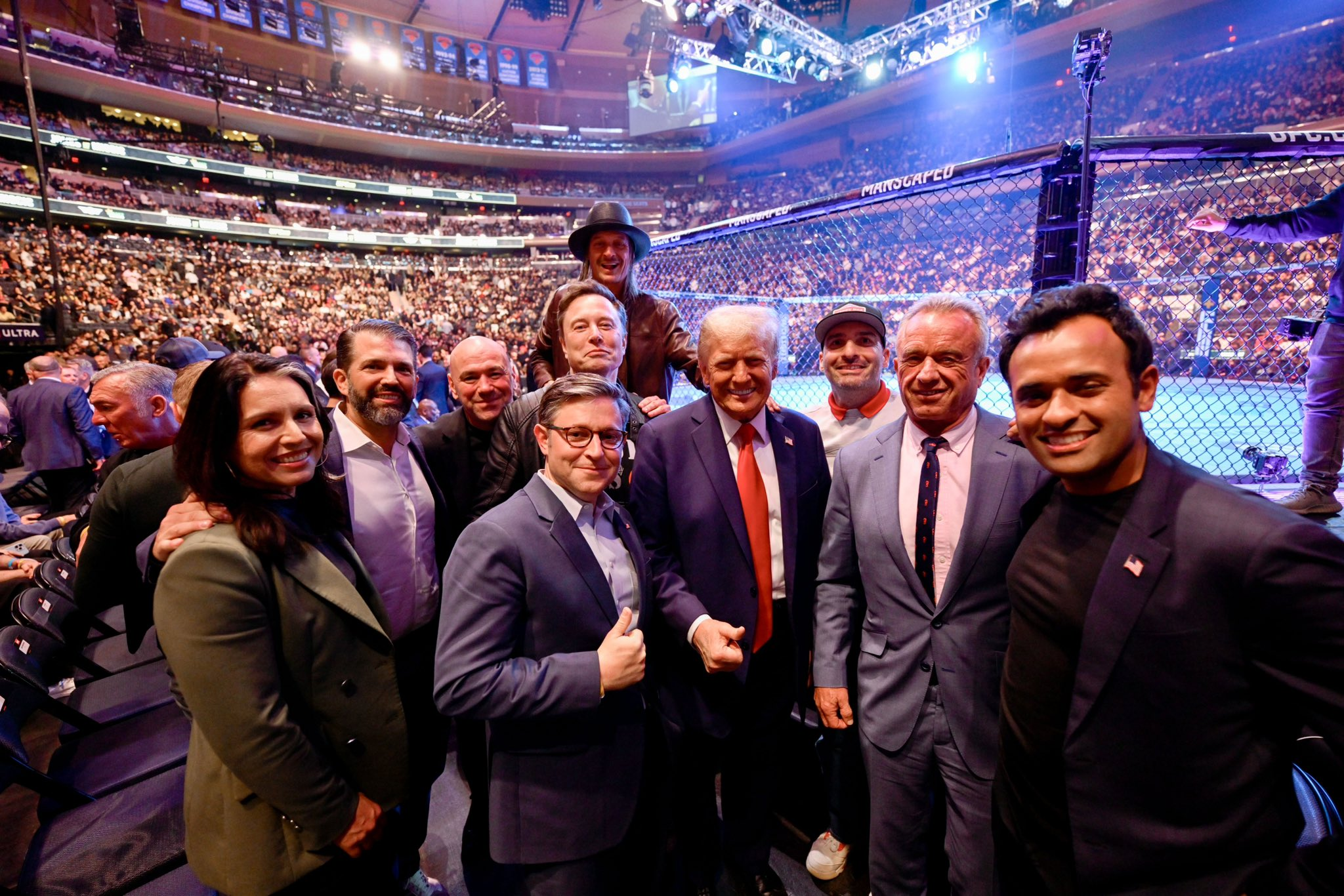
Ramaswamy at a UFC fight in November 2024, with President-elect Donald Trump and Elon Musk

In May 2023, Ramaswamy's campaign admitted that he had paid an editor to alter his Wikipedia biography before announcing his candidacy, but denied that the payment for edits was politically motivated. The edits to the Wikipedia biography removed references to Ramaswamy's postgraduate fellowship from the Paul & Daisy Soros Fellowship for New Americans, as well as his involvement with the Ohio COVID-19 Response Team. Paul and Daisy Soros are the elder brother and sister-in-law, respectively, of businessman and social activist George Soros, who has been the subject of numerous conspiracy theories among American conservatives and rightists. Ramaswamy's campaign denied attempting to "scrub" his Wikipedia page and argued the edits were revisions of "factual distortions".

In January, after finishing fourth in the Iowa caucuses, Ramaswamy ended his campaign and endorsed Trump. For the remainder of the 2024 U.S. presidential election, Ramaswamy served the Trump campaign as a political surrogate, representing the Trump campaign and attending campaign events in place of the candidate.

=== Department of Government Efficiency ===
A week after the 2024 election, President-elect Donald Trump announced that Ramaswamy and businessman Elon Musk had been tasked to lead the newly proposed Department of Government Efficiency (DOGE). However, Ramaswamy never worked with the DOGE team during the Trump administration, as on Inauguration Day, he dropped out of DOGE to focus on a potential 2026 Ohio gubernatorial campaign. The departure was reportedly due to friction between Ramaswamy and other DOGE leadership and staff, as well as Ramaswamy stating American work culture "venerated mediocrity over excellence".

=== 2026 Ohio gubernatorial election ===
On February 15, 2025, Ramaswamy filed to enter the 2026 Ohio gubernatorial election. He officially announced his run on February 24, and was endorsed by President Donald Trump in a social media post on the same day. According to political analysts, Trump's early backing of Ramaswamy's candidacy was expected to help his campaign avoid a difficult primary. Ramaswamy also received support from Elon Musk, who posted an endorsement on the social media platform X. On May 9, 2025, Ramaswamy received the official endorsement of the Ohio Republican Party's State Central Committee, marking the earliest the state Republican Party had ever endorsed a non-incumbent gubernatorial candidate.

On January 6, 2026, Ramaswamy announced that he had selected Ohio State Senate President Rob McColley as his running mate for lieutenant governor. On January 7, Ohio Governor Mike DeWine endorsed Ramaswamy's candidacy. Later that month, Ramaswamy's campaign ended its contract with a private security firm after a bodyguard assigned to his family was arrested on federal drug trafficking charges; it was later disclosed that several guards provided by the firm were not properly licensed to work as armed security in Ohio.

In the May 5 Republican primary, Ramaswamy defeated Casey Putsch, 82.5% to 17.5%. The Ramaswamy campaign has been described as "ugly" and heavily focused upon negative campaigning. In October, he took responsibility for an ad featuring the estranged mother of his opponent Amy Acton, telling voters not to trust her daughter. Acton's mother and stepfather lost custody of her when she was 12 years old, due to charges of child rape against the stepfather. Sitting Ohio governor Mike DeWine and senator Jon Husted condemned the ad and distanced themselves from Ramaswamy and his campaign following his campaign's decision to continue airing the ad.

On November 3, Ramaswamy lost the general election to Acton, becoming the first Republican nominee to lose an Ohio gubernatorial election since Ken Blackwell in 2006. If elected, Ramaswamy would have become Ohio's first Indian American and first billionaire governor. Acton let Ramaswamy's call to concede the election go to voicemail; she later stated she was uninterested in speaking with Ramaswamy, citing the attack advertisement featuring her estranged mother.

== Political positions ==
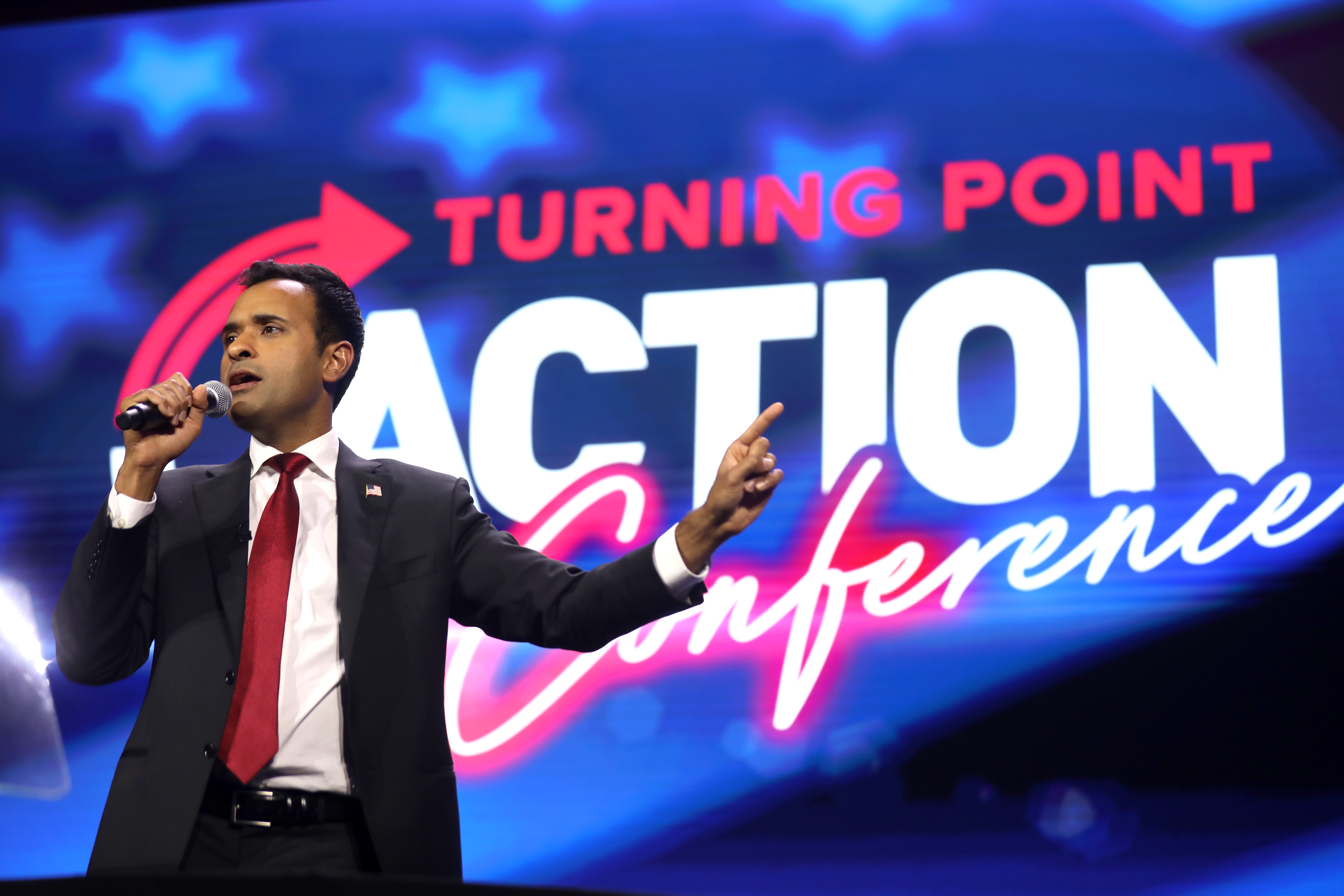
Ramaswamy in West Palm Beach, Florida

Ramaswamy has often described himself as an American nationalist. He has described the United States as being in the middle of a national identity crisis, precipitated by what he calls "new secular religions like COVID-ism, climate-ism, and gender ideology". Although they were running against each other for the 2024 Republican nomination, Ramaswamy vocally supported Trump. After Trump was indicted on federal criminal charges in 2023, Ramaswamy supported him, promising to pardon Trump if elected president. He also promised to pardon Julian Assange, Ross Ulbricht, and Edward Snowden. He suggested that he considered Robert F. Kennedy Jr. as a possible running mate.

=== Anti-woke ===
In 2023, The New York Times described Ramaswamy as an anti-woke candidate. Ramaswamy's August 2021 book, the New York Times bestseller, Woke Inc described his view of the so-called "modern woke-industrial complex". Ramaswamy gained recognition in right-wing circles by opposing corporate E.S.G. programs that advance political, social and environmental causes in businesses. In his presidential campaign, he asserted that "faith, patriotism and hard work" are being replaced by "new secular religions like Covidism, climatism and gender ideology."

=== Education ===
In September 2023, Ramaswamy called for publishing school curriculum online and installing cameras in classrooms. In November 2025, he suggested making Ohio schools operate year-round and extending the school day until 4 p.m. to reduce parents' childcare expenses.

In March 2026, Ramaswamy called for consolidating Ohio's public universities, arguing that the state had too many institutions and that consolidation could create specialized "centers of excellence." Following criticism, he clarified that he wanted to consolidate duplicated academic programs rather than close universities.

=== Critical race theory ===
He argued that critical race theory indoctrinates public school children. Ramaswamy has opposed affirmative action and vowed to rescind the now revoked Executive Order 11246. He argued that American-style capitalism provides an antidote to India's caste system.

=== Abortion ===
Ramaswamy has generally opposed abortion and called for abortion to be left to states while opposing a national ban. He has often equated abortion to murder. In the past, he has supported state-level six-week abortion bans, with exceptions for rape, incest, and danger to the woman's life.

=== LGBTQ rights ===
Ramaswamy has called the LGBTQ movement a "cult". He said through a spokesperson that he considered same-sex marriage "settled precedent", but has supported broad restrictions on the rights of transgender Americans and used anti-trans rhetoric.

=== Gun rights ===
In October 2026, Ramaswamy supported lowering Ohio's minimum age for purchasing handguns from 21 to 18.

=== Executive power ===
Ramaswamy pledged, if elected, to rule by executive fiat, to a degree unprecedented among modern U.S. presidents. He pledged to fire 75% of federal employees; dismantle civil service protections, making federal employment at-will; and abolish at least five federal agencies, including the Education Department, FBI, ATF, IRS, Nuclear Regulatory Commission, and USDA's Food and Nutrition Service. He called the Food and Drug Administration "corrupt" and vowed to "expose and ultimately gut" the FDA. He asserted that the president has the unilateral power to abolish agencies by executive order, although executive agencies and departments are created by statute, and under the Constitution, Congress has the power of the purse. He called for an eight-year term for all government employees and pledged to revoke Executive Order 10988, an order issued by President John F. Kennedy that gives federal employees the right to collectively bargain. He proposed to repeal the federal law that requires presidents to spend all the money Congress appropriates.

=== Voting rights ===
Ramaswamy favored raising the standard voting age from 18 to 25, which would require repealing the 26th Amendment to the Constitution. This proposal would have disenfranchised a portion of the U.S. electorate; nearly 9% of voters in the 2020 general election were under 25. Ramaswamy, who is a citizen because of birthright citizenship, has repeatedly called for an end to birthright citizenship. He said he would have allowed citizens between 18 and 24 to vote only if they are enlisted in the military, work as first responders, or pass the civics test required for naturalization. He also supported making Election Day a federal holiday, while eliminating Juneteenth (which he called "useless" and "redundant") as a federal holiday.

=== Border control ===
Ramaswamy pledged to "use our military to annihilate the Mexican drug cartels". He favored federal legalization of marijuana.

=== Taxes ===
He took no public position on the 2017 Trump tax cuts. In a thought experiment he expressed support for an inheritance tax, and called for ending the Federal Reserve's dual mandate, but during his presidential campaign he expressed opposition to an inheritance tax.

=== Work visas ===
Ramaswamy has supported the reforming of the H-1B visa, a work visa program for non-US citizens, noting problems with the current lottery-based system and suggesting it should instead be based on merit.

=== Foreign affairs ===
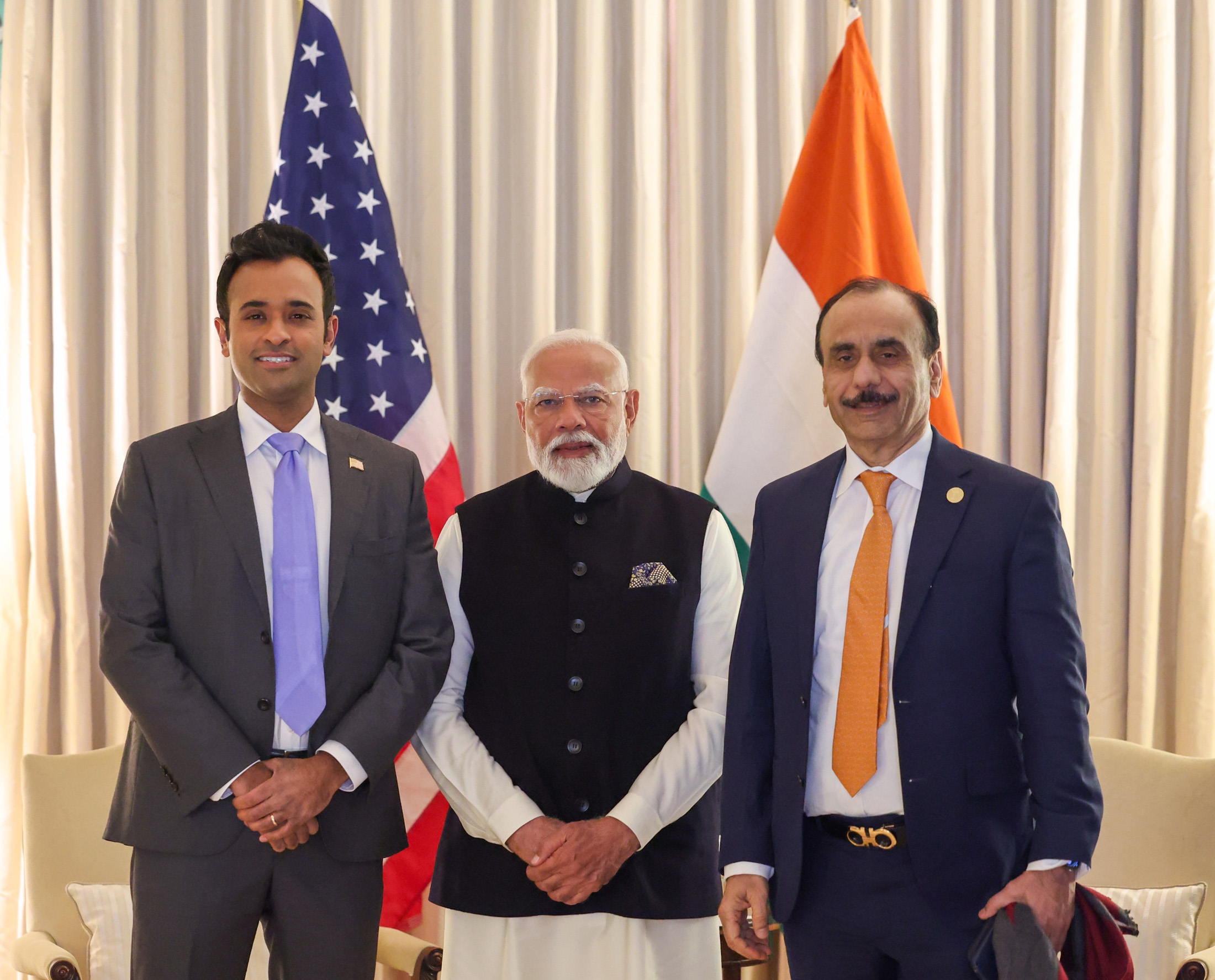
Ramaswamy with Prime Minister Narendra Modi, February 2025

Ramaswamy said he would not have used U.S. military force against Iran. In November 2023, he condemned Azerbaijan's military operation against the Armenian population of Nagorno-Karabakh and said that the U.S. should block all its military aid to Azerbaijan.

==== Russia-Ukraine ====
Ramaswamy said he favored "some major concessions to Russia, including freezing those current lines of control in a Korean-war style armistice agreement" to end the Russo-Ukrainian War. He favored ending U.S. military aid to Ukraine, excluding Ukraine from NATO, and allowing Russia to remain in occupied regions of Ukraine in exchange for an agreement that Russia end its alliance with China.

==== China-Taiwan ====
Ramaswamy expressed support for Taiwanese independence, and floated the idea of "putting a gun in every Taiwanese household" to deter an invasion by China, but said the U.S. should not militarily defend Taiwan from Chinese attack after the U.S. has achieved "semiconductor independence", which he pledged to achieve by 2028.

==== Israel-Palestine ====
Ramaswamy is pro-Israel and calls Israel "a Divine nation, charged with a Divine purpose". Ramaswamy has said Israel should feel free to oppose the two-state solution. After Hamas's October 7, 2023, attack on Israel, Ramaswamy said that in his view, "Israel should be able to make the decisions of how it defends itself" while suggesting that the U.S. should provide a "diplomatic Iron Dome" for Israel. Regarding the U.S. aid to Israel, he said that it should be contingent upon Israel's plans for defeating Hamas and its actions in Gaza.

=== Climate and energy ===
Although he said he is not a climate denier, Ramaswamy said in a Republican primary debate that "the climate change agenda is a hoax" and asserted, falsely, that "more people are dying from climate policies than actual climate change." At other times, he said that he accepted that burning fossil fuels causes climate change, but called global climate change "not entirely bad"; said that "people should be proud to live a high-carbon lifestyle"; and said that the U.S. should "drill, frack, burn coal".

Ramaswamy criticized what he calls the "climate cult" and said that as president, he would "abandon the anticarbon framework as it exists" and halt "any mandate to measure carbon dioxide". In 2022, he urged Chevron to increase oil production and criticized its support for a carbon tax. Ramaswamy's company holds a 0.02% stake in Chevron.

Ramaswamy opposed subsidies for electric vehicles. In his arguments, Ramaswamy used incorrect statistical claims about the history of carbon dioxide in the atmosphere. His critics said that when he cited the upsides of climate change and fossil fuels, such as reduced cold-related deaths, cheap energy, and faster plant growth, he ignored larger downsides, such as increases in other weather-related disasters, deaths, and plant damage, and ignored that there are now less-polluting sources of cheap energy.

=== Data centers ===
In March 2025, Ramaswamy expressed support for the expansion of data centers in Ohio, describing the state's growing data center industry as a "good thing."

=== Promotion of conspiracy theories ===
In Republican primary debates and campaign appearances, Ramaswamy often repeated and promoted an array of right-wing conspiracy theories and falsehoods. In the days after the January 6, 2021, attack on the Capitol, he condemned the attack, but argued that social media bans on Trump violate the First Amendment. Later, while running for president, Ramaswamy repeatedly claimed that the January 6 attack "was an inside job", a claim supported by no evidence and refuted by numerous investigations.

Invoking September 11 conspiracy theories, he asked whether "federal agents were on the planes" that hit the Twin Towers during the September 11 attacks. He has asserted that "big tech" played a role in stealing the 2020 election, referring the Hunter Biden laptop story being suppressed by the mainstream media and social networks, while also claiming that the "Great Replacement" conspiracy theory was "the Democratic Party's platform" to benefit from demographic shifts. When asked about some of his past remarks, Ramaswamy frequently denied making the comments or claimed to have been misquoted, even when those denials were belied by recordings, transcripts, or extracts from his writing.

== Personal life ==
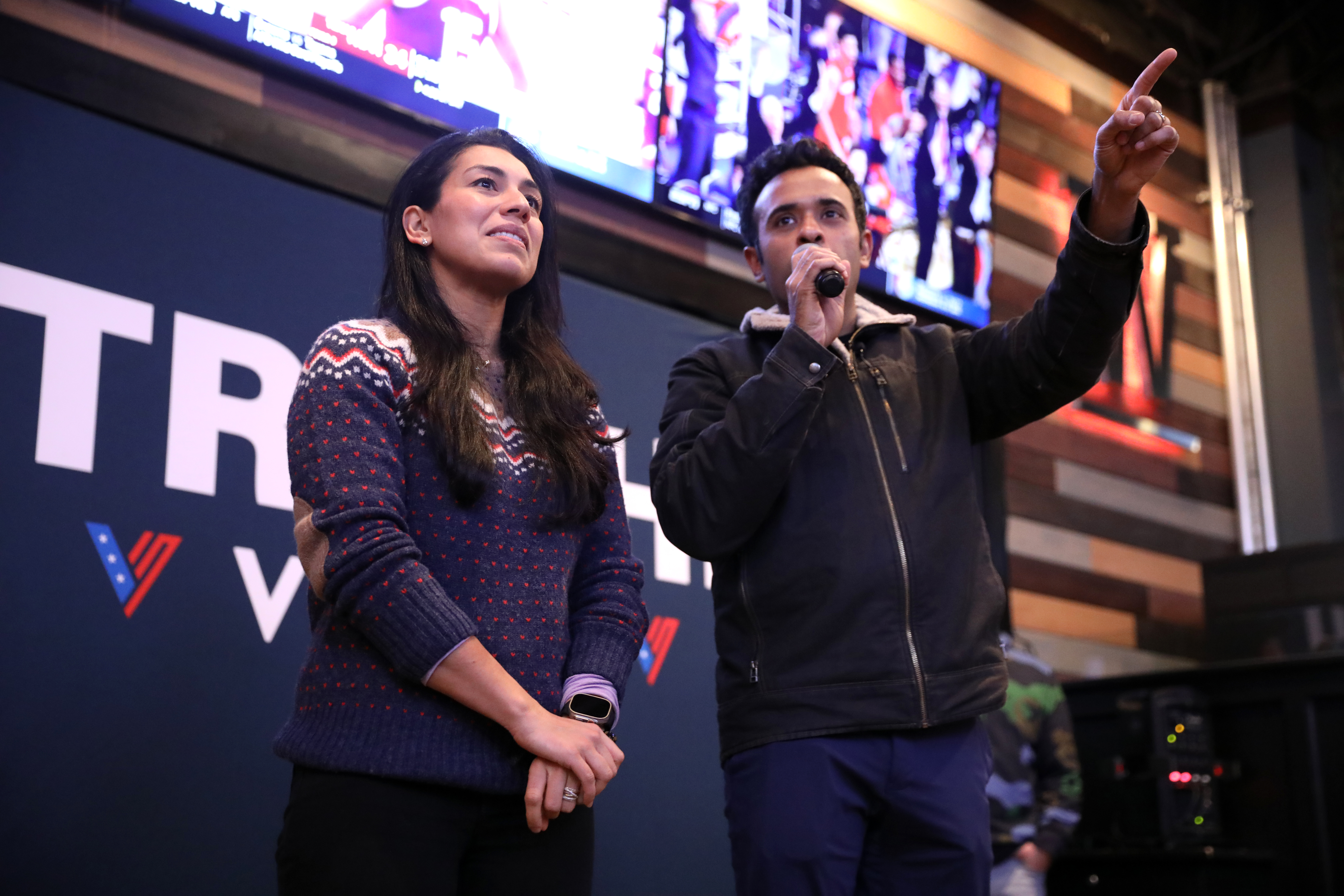
Apoorva and Ramaswamy in January 2024, campaigning in Des Moines, Iowa

Ramaswamy's wife, Apoorva Ramaswamy (née Tewari), is a laryngologist; they met at Yale, when he was studying law and she was studying medicine. They married in 2015 and have two sons and a daughter. Ramaswamy has a younger brother, Shankar, who worked for him at Axovant and later co-founded Kriya Therapeutics, a biopharmaceutical company.

Ramaswamy is a monotheistic Hindu. According to relatives, he is fluent in Tamil (Palakkad dialect) and understands (but does not speak) Malayalam. He is a vegetarian and wrote in 2020, "I believe it is wrong to kill sentient animals for culinary pleasure." According to his parents, he has tried to develop a good understanding of both Eastern and Western culture.

In 2023, Ramaswamy's campaign said his net worth was around $1 billion. In September 2026, Forbes estimated Ramaswamy's net worth to be $2.3 billion; his wealth comes from biotech and financial businesses. During his early venture capitalist career, he lived in Manhattan. As of 2021, he owned a house in Butler County, Ohio, but in 2023, the only real estate he reported owning was a house in Columbus, Ohio. A 2023 Politico profile of Ramaswamy mentions him living in a $2 million estate in the Columbus suburb of Upper Arlington. In 2025, Ramaswamy purchased American Eagle CEO Jay Schottenstein's $15 million mansion in Bexley, Ohio, near the Ohio Governor's Mansion.

== Electoral history ==
=== 2024 ===
Iowa Republican precinct caucuses, January 15, 2024
Candidate	Votes	Percentage	Actual delegate count		
Candidate	Votes	Percentage	Bound	Unbound	Total
Donald Trump	56,243	51.00%	20	0	20
Ron DeSantis	23,491	21.30%	9	0	9
Nikki Haley	21,027	19.07%	8	0	8
Vivek Ramaswamy	8,430	7.64%	3	0	3
Ryan Binkley	768	0.70%	0	0	0
Asa Hutchinson	188	0.17%	0	0	0
Other	90	0.08%	0	0	0
Chris Christie (withdrawn)	35	0.03%	0	0	0
Total:	110,272	100.00%	40	0	40

=== 2026 ===
2026 Ohio gubernatorial Republican primary
Party	Candidate	Votes	%	±%
Republican	Vivek Ramaswamy	673,902	82.5%	
Republican	Casey Putsch	143,257	17.5%	

2026 Ohio gubernatorial general election
Party	Candidate	Votes	%	±%
Democratic	Amy Acton	2,404,178	52.3%	
Republican	Vivek Ramaswamy	2,039,730	44.4%	
Libertarian	Don Kissick	151,874	3.3%	

== Published works ==
- Woke, Inc.: Inside Corporate America's Social Justice Scam. New York: Center Street. 2021. ISBN 978-1546090786. OCLC 1237631944.
- Nation of Victims: Identity Politics, the Death of Merit, and the Path Back to Excellence. New York: Center Street. 2022. ISBN 978-1546002963. OCLC 1546002960.
- Capitalist Punishment: How Wall Street Is Using Your Money to Create a Country You Didn't Vote For. New York: Broadside Books. 2023. ISBN 978-0063337756. OCLC 1362864450.
- Truths: The Future of America First. New York: Threshold Editions. 2024. ISBN 978-1668078433. OCLC 1453853062.

== Notes ==
Party political offices
Preceded by Mike DeWine	Republican nominee for Governor of Ohio; 2026	Most recent
