= Chapter (company) =

Healthcare company

- Type: Private
- Industry: Healthcare
- Founded: 2020; 6 years ago, in New York, NY
- Founders: Cobi Blumenfeld-Gantz; Corey Metzman; Vivek Ramaswamy
- Headquarters: New York City, U.S.
- Area served: United States
- Website: askchapter.org

Chapter is a Medicare advisory company headquartered in New York City. The company provides services for comparing Medicare coverage, choosing health plans, and identifying doctors and hospitals.

== History ==
CEO Cobi Blumenfeld-Gantz founded the company in 2020 with Corey Metzman, and Vivek Ramaswamy. Shortly after the company’s founding, Ramaswamy stepped down to run for political office.

Chapter started as a Medicare brokerage using AI to compare thousands of options to identify plans that met the particular medical needs of its clients, while preventing its advisors from seeing referral fees offered by insurance companies. Chapter built AI that can assess whether a doctor is likely to be included in an insurance network and whether an applicant is likely to pass an insurer's underwriting process.

In 2021, Chapter raised $17 million in a Series A funding round that was led by Narya Capital, a venture capital firm founded by JD Vance. Vance served on the company’s board of directors before stepping down to run for Senate in 2021 and was replaced by Peter Thiel.

By 2025, Chapter had developed an application for Medicare beneficiaries to access over-the-counter (OTC) benefits provided through their plans that might otherwise go unused. The app allows users to determine which products qualify under their OTC benefits and arrange for delivery of eligible items.

In 2026, Chapter raised $100 million in a funding round led by Generation Investment Management, a firm founded by Al Gore, which brought the company’s valuation to $3 billion.
