= Nelotanserin =

Chemical compound

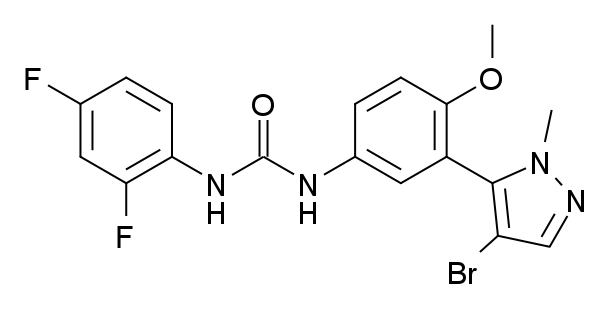

Clinical data
- Other names: APD-125; APD125
- Routes of administration: Oral
- Drug class: Serotonin 5-HT_{2A} receptor antagonist
- ATC code: None

Pharmacokinetic data
- Elimination half-life: 3.9–23.7 hours (dose-dependent)

Identifiers
- IUPAC name: 1-[3-(4-bromo-2-methyl-2H-pyrazol-3-yl)-4-methoxyphenyl]-3-(2,4-difluorophenyl)urea
- CAS Number: 839713-36-9
- PubChem CID: 11683556
- ChemSpider: 9858284
- UNII: 4ZA73QEW2P
- KEGG: D09645
- CompTox Dashboard (EPA): DTXSID40232868

Chemical and physical data
- Formula: C_{18}H_{15}BrF_{2}N_{4}O_{2}
- Molar mass: 437.245 g·mol^{−1}
- 3D model (JSmol): Interactive image
- SMILES: Brc1cnn(C)c1-c2cc(ccc2OC)NC(=O)Nc3ccc(F)cc3F
- InChI: InChI=1S/C18H15BrF2N4O2/c1-25-17(13(19)9-22-25)12-8-11(4-6-16(12)27-2)23-18(26)24-15-5-3-10(20)7-14(15)21/h3-9H,1-2H3,(H2,23,24,26); Key:COSPVUFTLGQDQL-UHFFFAOYSA-N

Nelotanserin (former developmental code name APD-125) is a drug developed by Arena Pharmaceuticals which acts as an inverse agonist on the serotonin receptor subtype 5-HT_{2A} and was under development for the treatment of insomnia. It was shown to be effective and well tolerated in clinical trials, but development was halted in December 2008 because the substance did not meet the trial's effectiveness endpoints. Research continues on newer analogues which may potentially be more successful.

== Pharmacology ==
=== Pharmacokinetics ===
The elimination half-life of nelotanserin is dose-dependent and ranges from 3.9 hours at 10 mg to 23.2–23.7 hours at doses of 80–160 mg.

== Research ==
Later, nelotanserin was repurposed for the treatment of Lewy body dementia (LBD) by Axovant Sciences (now Sio Gene Therapies). In late 2018, the company announced that while nelotanserin was generally well-tolerated by LBD patients in a small Phase 2 clinical trial for the treatment of REM sleep behavior disorder (RBD) and there were positive indications on some secondary trial outcomes such as sleep diaries and some polysomnogram sleep parameters, the drug failed to meet its primary endpoint of reducing the frequency of RBD episodes and would be discontinued.

== See also ==
- List of investigational insomnia drugs
