= John F. Barrett =

American businessman

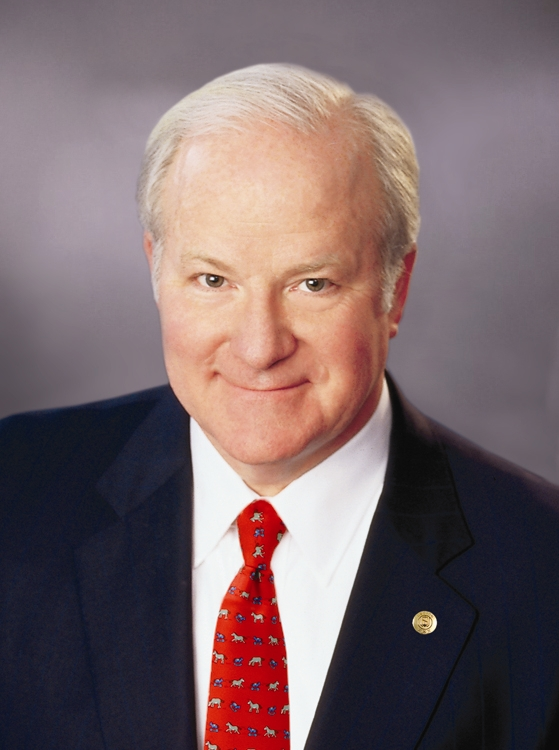
- Born: March 16, 1949 (age 77)
- Education: University of Cincinnati
- Occupations: CEO of Western & Southern Financial Group

John F. Barrett (born March 16, 1949) is the American chairman, president and chief executive officer of Western & Southern Financial Group. Barrett has been the CEO since 1994, and the president since 1989. Under Barrett's leadership, Western & Southern has grown from a small Midwestern life insurance company founded in 1888 into a national financial services enterprise and has doubled in size every five years for the past 15 years. Western & Southern has assets owned, managed and under care in excess of $100 billion as of 2021 and is one of the eight highest-rated life insurance groups in the world, based on its Standard & Poor's rating.

During the Great Recession, Western & Southern maintained strong economic health with Barrett at the helm. The company was able to develop, through its subsidiary Eagle Realty Group the largest office building in southern Ohio, the Great American Tower at Queen City Square. Barrett's leadership in securing a tenant for the Tower helped to ensure its success. The Great American Tower, opened in January 2011, is part of the Queen City Square complex that totals more than one million square feet.

== Early life ==
Barrett graduated from St. Xavier High School in Cincinnati. He obtained a bachelor's degree in business administration from the University of Cincinnati in 1971. He was a member of the Ohio Epsilon chapter of the Sigma Alpha Epsilon fraternity at UC. He was president and CEO of the Bank of New York (Delaware) before joining Western & Southern in 1987.

== Business and community involvement ==
A business leader and supporter of the Cincinnati community, Barrett is the recipient of the following awards and distinctions: the Honorary Doctor of Humane Letters from the University of Cincinnati (June 2011); the "Connecting Cultures and Communities Award" presented by the Cincinnati Human Relations Commission (May 2010); the most influential person in the Greater Cincinnati area by Cincy magazine in its annual Power 100 list (February 2009); and the 2007 Outstanding Community Service Award from Volunteers of America.

He received the 2008 Volunteer Leadership Award from the Health Improvement Collaborative of Greater Cincinnati for leading a joint task force created in 2001 to address the low number of physicians in Greater Cincinnati. Under his leadership, Cincinnati MD Resource Center was established, and in 2004, Cincinnati MDJobs.com was launched.

He gave the commencement address to the University of Cincinnati's Class of 2011 at its June ceremonies.

Barrett is president of the Association of Ohio Life Insurance Companies and is a member of Washington, D.C.'s Business Roundtable and the Financial Services Roundtable. In 2006, he led statewide tax reform in Ohio as part of his involvement as chairman of the Ohio Business Roundtable.

He was on the boards of many Cincinnati arts organizations, including the Cincinnati Arts Association, the Cincinnati Art Museum and the Taft Museum of Art.

Barrett has been on the board of directors of Convergys Corporation since 1998 and Cintas since 2011. He formerly was on several other boards, including Fifth Third Bancorp, The Andersons, Inc. and Touchstone Investment Trusts.

In 2013, Barrett led the controversial purchase of the Anna Louise Inn, a historic property and shelter for low-income women overlooking a scenic park around which Western & Southern has developed other real estate. The story of the contentious legal struggle received national attention and finally culminated in May 2013 when the Inn's owner, Cincinnati Union Bethel, sold the property to Western & Southern for $4 million.
