= Strive Asset Management =

American investment firm

- Type: Private (subsidiary of Strive Inc.)
- Traded as: Nasdaq: ASST
- Industry: Investment management
- Founded: 2022; 4 years ago
- Founders: Vivek Ramaswamy, Anson Frericks
- Headquarters: Dallas, Texas, U.S.
- Key people: Matt Cole (Chairman and CEO); Ben Werkman (Chief Investment Officer); Arshia Sarkhani (Chief Marketing Officer)
- Services: Exchange-traded funds, Mutual funds, Wealth management
- Parent: Strive Inc.
- Subsidiaries: Asset Entities, Inc.
- Website: www.strive.com

Strive Asset Management is an American investment management firm founded in 2022. The firm operates mutual funds, exchange-traded products (ETPs), and wealth management services. Headquartered in Dallas, Texas, it operates as a subsidiary of Strive Enterprises, Inc. and is registered with the U.S. Securities and Exchange Commission (SEC) as an investment adviser.

== History ==
Strive Asset Management was co-founded in early 2022 by Vivek Ramaswamy and former Anheuser-Busch president Anson Frericks. The firm was originally headquartered in Columbus, Ohio before relocating its headquarters to Dallas, Texas in 2024. It raised about $20 million from outside investors, including Peter Thiel, JD Vance, and Bill Ackman.

Strive's flagship fund, the exchange-traded fund DRLL, launched in 2022 as an "anti-woke" energy sector index fund. The fund focuses on the energy sector without incorporating environmental, social, and governance (ESG) criteria. Additional ETFs, mutual funds, and a proxy voting platform were subsequently introduced to facilitate shareholder participation in corporate governance.

By November 2022, Strive reported managing over $500 million in assets under management. Vivek Ramaswamy served as executive chairman before resigning in February 2023 to focus on his presidential campaign.

By 2024, the firm launched direct indexing services in partnership with Fidelity and Charles Schwab, providing customized portfolio management, tax-loss harvesting, and proxy voting tools. In 2025, Strive spun off its registered investment adviser (RIA) arm into an independent firm and consolidated advisory services under model portfolios and a collective investment trust (CIT).

=== Digital asset initiatives ===
In September 2025, Strive announced plans to enter the digital asset market with a Bitcoin Bond ETF, focused on bonds issued by companies acquiring Bitcoin. The announcement included a Board of Directors comprising Mahesh Ramakrishnan, co-founder of Escape Velocity (EV3); Pierre Rochard, chief executive of The Bitcoin Bond Company; James Lavish, managing partner of The Bitcoin Opportunity Fund; Avik Roy, co-founder of the Foundation for Research on Equal Opportunity; and Jonathan Macey, professor of corporate law at Yale University, among others.

In 2025, Strive merged with Asset Entities to form a publicly traded company under the Strive brand. The merger incorporated the companies’ Bitcoin holdings into the combined entity’s treasury and was supported by a $750 million private investment in public equity, with potential additional funding through warrants.

In September 2025, the firm announced the acquisition of Semler Scientific in an all-stock deal valued at $1.3 billion, increasing its combined Bitcoin treasury above 10,900 BTC. Strive also explored purchasing claims related to 75,000 BTC from Mt. Gox.

== Operations ==
Strive operates as a registered investment adviser providing asset management, fund distribution, proxy voting, and corporate governance services. Its investment products include sector-based ETFs, actively managed funds, and a direct indexing platform with shareholder engagement tools. The firm submits shareholder proposals and correspondence to U.S. corporations regarding governance and diversity policies.

== Reception ==
In 2023, the firm acquired a stake in McDonald’s Corporation and requested changes to the company’s diversity policies as part of its governance efforts.

In 2025, Morningstar assigned Strive a Below Average Parent Pillar rating, citing management turnover and strategic transitions, while noting low fees across its ETF and mutual fund products.
