= Philip J. Pauly =

American historian

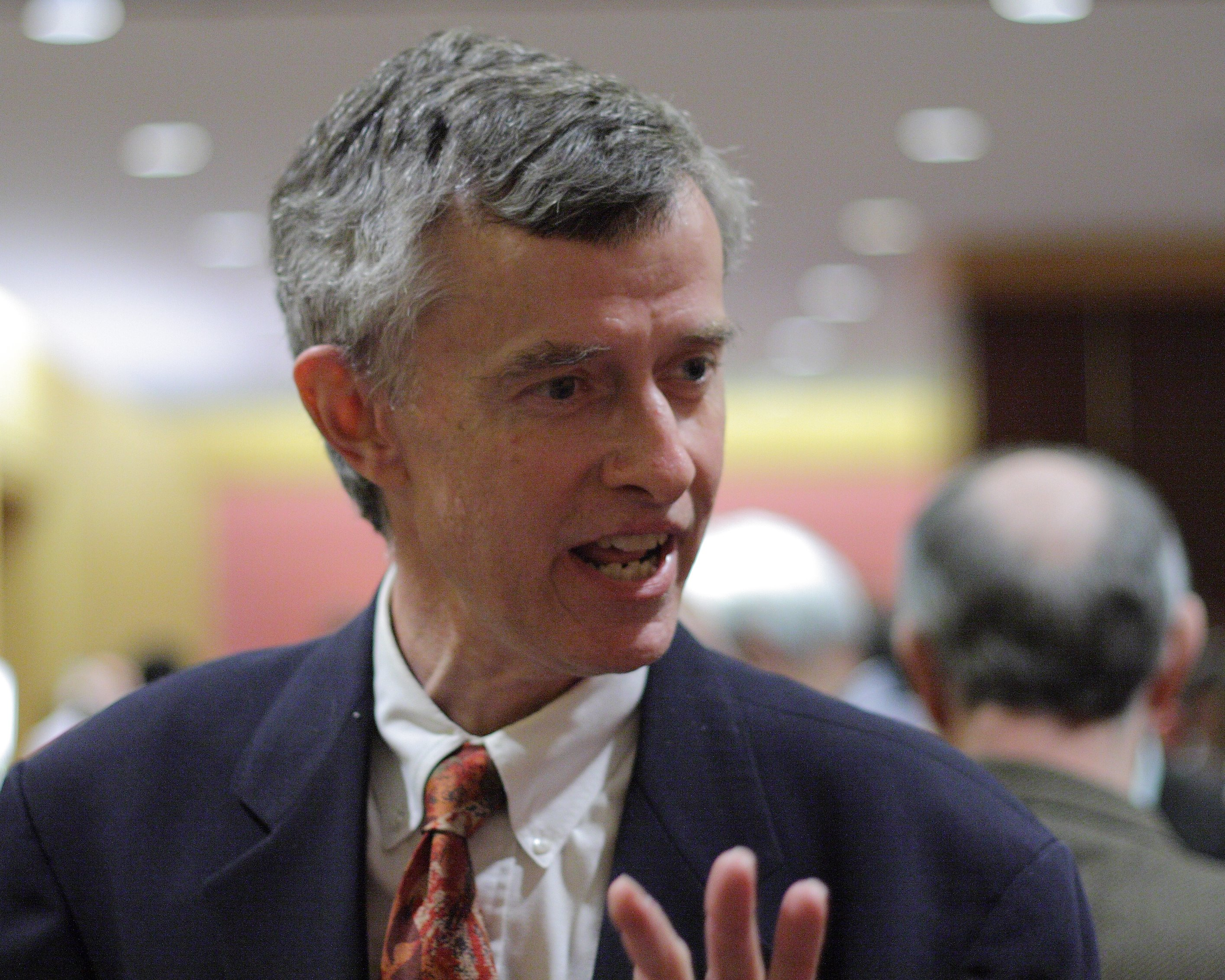
Philip J. Pauly in 2007

Philip Joseph Pauly (September 3, 1950 – April 2, 2008) was an American historian of science known for his work on the history of biology in the United States. A professor at Rutgers University, he published three books: Controlling Life: Jacques Loeb and the Engineering Ideal in Biology; Biologists and the Promise of American Life: From Meriwether Lewis to Alfred Kinsey; and Fruits and Plains: The Horticultural Transformation of America. His final book was honored with the Council on Botanical and Horticultural Libraries Annual Literature Award in 2009.

A native of Cincinnati, Ohio, Pauly graduated from St. Xavier High School in Cincinnati in 1968. He was an undergraduate at Catholic University, graduating in 1971. He earned an M.A. in 1975 from the University of Maryland, College Park and a Ph.D. in 1981 from Johns Hopkins University, where he studied with Donna Haraway. He also held a predoctoral fellowship at the Smithsonian Institution and a postdoctoral fellowship at Ohio State University. In 1981 he came to Rutgers University where he spent the rest of his career, becoming a full professor in 2001. He was also an active member of professional organizations such as the History of Science Society and the International Society for History, Philosophy, and Social Studies of Biology, serving on many committees and editorial boards.

For his scholarship, historian Jane Maienschien praised Pauly for his "way of seeing the larger picture". His first book, Controlling Life: Jacques Loeb and the Engineering Ideal in Biology (1987), is a biography of Jacques Loeb that also explores Loeb's broader influence on biology. His second book, Biologists and the Promise of American Life: From Meriwether Lewis to Alfred Kinsey (2000), traces the impact of biologists on American culture. His third book, Fruits and Plains: The Horticultural Transformation of America, which ties the history of biology to environmental history and American history more broadly.

Pauly married Michele Helen Bogart on July 23, 1981, with whom he had one son, Nicholas. Pauly was diagnosed with cancer in 1993; after treatment and a period of remission, the cancer (non-Hodgkin's lymphoma) returned in 2006, and despite treatment with stem cells from his sister, he died in 2008.

== Publications ==
- Pauly, Philip Joseph (1987), Controlling Life: Jacques Loeb and the Engineering Ideal in Biology, Oxford, UK: Oxford University Press, ISBN 0-19-504244-1
