= Intepirdine =

Chemical compound

Clinical data
- Other names: SB-742457, RVT-101
- Routes of administration: Oral
- ATC code: none

Legal status
- Legal status: Investigational/abandoned

Identifiers
- IUPAC name: 3-Phenylsulfonyl-8-(piperazin-1-yl)quinoline
- CAS Number: 607742-69-8
- PubChem CID: 11256720
- DrugBank: DB12680
- ChemSpider: 9431746
- UNII: 2IOB2M82HY
- KEGG: D10942
- ChEMBL: ChEMBL1083390
- CompTox Dashboard (EPA): DTXSID30976249
- ECHA InfoCard: 100.158.094

Chemical and physical data
- Formula: C_{19}H_{19}N_{3}O_{2}S
- Molar mass: 353.44 g·mol^{−1}
- 3D model (JSmol): Interactive image
- SMILES: C3CNCCN3c1cccc(c1nc4)cc4S(=O)(=O)c2ccccc2
- InChI: InChI=1S/C19H19N3O2S/c23-25(24,16-6-2-1-3-7-16)17-13-15-5-4-8-18(19(15)21-14-17)22-11-9-20-10-12-22/h1-8,13-14,20H,9-12H2; Key:JJZFWROHYSMCMU-UHFFFAOYSA-N

Intepirdine (INN; developmental codes SB-742457, RVT-101) is a selective 5-HT_{6} receptor antagonist with potential cognition, memory, and learning-enhancing effects. It was under development by GlaxoSmithKline for the treatment of Alzheimer's disease and demonstrated some preliminary efficacy in phase II clinical trials. GSK chose not to continue development and sold the rights to Axovant Sciences for $5 million in December 2014.

Results of a phase III clinical trial for the treatment of Alzheimer's disease were reported in September 2017. The trial showed no improvement over control group and Axovant lost 70% of its value upon the announcement of the trial results. Intepirdine also entered clinical trials for dementia with Lewy bodies, also with negative results. Consequently, Axovant Sciences announced in 2018 that it has discontinued development of this drug.

The company that purchased this medication, Axovant Sciences, is accused of directing a pump and dump scheme, a form of fraud consisting of a few investment leaders moving amounts of money sufficiently large to represent a high proportion of the assets under management to manipulate the market value of a publicly held financial instrument.
