= Francis M. Forster =

American physician

Francis Michael Forster
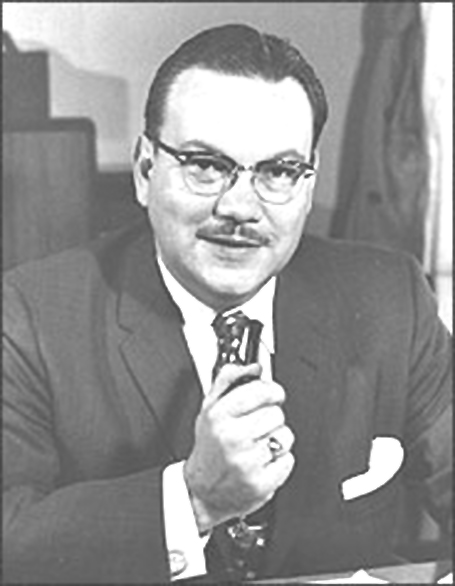
- Francis M. Forster in 1953
- Born: February 14, 1912; Cincinnati, Ohio
- Died: February 23, 2006 (aged 94); Cincinnati, Ohio
- Citizenship: US
- Education: Xavier University (B.S) & University of Cincinnati (M.D.)
- Known for: Research in Neurology; One of four founders of the American Academy of Neurology; Dean of the Georgetown University School of Medicine, 1953-1958; Consultant physician to President Dwight D. Eisenhower
- Awards: Honorary doctorates; Xavier University & Georgetown University
- Scientific career
- Fields: Medicine & Neurology
- Workplaces: Boston University; Jefferson Medical College; Georgetown University; & University of Wisconsin
- Academic advisors: Tracy Putnam & H. Houston Merritt

Francis Michael Forster was an eminent physician and neurologist, a former dean of the Georgetown University School of Medicine, and an internationally recognized expert on the diagnosis and treatment of epilepsy. Forster was born on February 14, 1912, in Cincinnati, Ohio, to Michael Joseph and Louise Barbara (née Schmidt) Forster, and he died on February 23, 2006, also in Cincinnati.

== Education ==
Forster attended St. Xavier High School in Cincinnati, garnering there an education in the classical languages of Greek and Latin. He then entered Xavier University, earning a B.S. degree in biology and chemistry in 1933, and was awarded an M.D. from the University of Cincinnati College of Medicine in 1937. Forster served as a rotating intern at Good Samaritan Hospital in Cincinnati, and then completed a residency in neurology at Boston City Hospital under the tutelage of Tracy Putnam and H. Houston Merritt. In the 1940s, training in neurology was paired inextricably with psychiatry, and Forster completed his postgraduate education in the latter discipline at the University of Pennsylvania. A Rockefeller Research Fellowship in neurophysiology followed thereafter at Yale University.

== Academic career ==
Forster's first academic appointment was as an instructor in neurology at the Boston University School of Medicine, where he joined the faculty in 1941. Two years later he moved to Jefferson Medical College in Philadelphia, Pennsylvania, where an interest developed in patients with epilepsy which would last for the rest of his career. Based largely on his research work in that area, Forster was invited to head the department of Neurology at Georgetown University School of Medicine as Professor & Chair, in 1950. At that institution, he expanded the teaching and clinical services in neuropsychiatry to include three affiliated hospitals in Washington, D.C., while continuing his personal research efforts in the study of epilepsy. Frank's skills as an administrator were increasingly recognized by his peers at Georgetown, and when Paul McNally, the dean of the medical school, became ill with coronary artery disease in 1952, Forster was chosen as his replacement. He presided over a steady expansion in the curriculum and the physical facilities at Georgetown over the next five years. Even though Forster's style was conversational and collegial, he was extremely adept politically and saw a tripling of extramural grant funding at Georgetown during his deanship. In addition, the Gorman Diagnostic & Research Center was built there under his guidance. In 1958, Forster was asked to chair the department of Neurology at the University of Wisconsin Medical School (UWMS) in Madison, Wisconsin, where a new facility had been built specifically for neurological patients and their rehabilitative needs. He remained on the active teaching and research faculty of UWMS for the next 20 years, and was subsequently the director of the Forster Epilepsy Center at the William Shainline Middleton Veterans Administration Hospital in Madison until 1982. Forster then retired to Cincinnati, where he remained active in public affairs and in alumni activities at Xavier University and the University of Cincinnati until shortly before his death from congestive heart failure in 2006. During the course of his long career, Forster trained over 100 academic neurologists, 16 of whom went on to become university departmental chairpersons on an international scale. In addition, he published over 200 peer-reviewed papers and five textbooks in the medical literature, and contributed many chapters to other monographs on neurology.

== Professional activities ==
In 1948, Forster worked together with Abraham B. Baker, Adolph Sahs, and Russell DeJong to create the American Academy of Neurology (AAN). They were thereafter known by Academy members as the founding "four horsemen," and the Francis Forster Fund at the AAN now honors Forster's contributions to the organization. He served as President of the AAN from 1957 to 1959, and was also President of the American Epilepsy Society and President of the American Board of Psychiatry & Neurology. Forster was a consultant to the surgeons general of the U.S. Air Force, U.S. Navy, and U.S. Public Health Service.

== Celebrity medical consultation ==
Because of his stature as an internationally-known neurologist and his local prominence in the area of Washington, D.C., Forster was called as a consultant in November 1957 to treat President Dwight D. Eisenhower, who had suffered a mild stroke. That episode resolved with no permanent disability for the chief executive, and Forster's role in the president's care further bolstered his reputation. He was next in the public eye in 1964, after the assassination of President John F. Kennedy and the murder of Kennedy's probable killer, Lee Harvey Oswald, by Jack Ruby in November 1963. Ruby's attorney, Melvin Belli, developed a premise for the defense wherein his client's aggressive behavior was explained by the presence of psychomotor-type temporal lobe epilepsy. Forster examined Ruby, as well as electroencephalograms that had been taken from him, and testified against Belli's hypothesis along with other neurologists. Ruby was convicted of Oswald's murder in March 1964. (However his conviction was later reversed and he died awaiting a new trial, still legally presumed innocent.) Forster also participated in 1958 in an international medical-exchange mission to the Soviet Union, visiting hospitals and clinics in Moscow, Leningrad, Kiev, Tbilisi, and Sokhumi and conferring with Soviet physicians in those cities. That effort helped to improve Russo-American medical communications during the 1960s and thereafter. At other points in his career, Forster was asked to consult on the diagnosis and treatment of President Elpidio Quirino of the Philippines, President Eduardo Lonardi of Argentina, Cardinal Archbishop Albert Gregory Meyer of Chicago, and Archbishop Gabriel Reyes of the Philippines.

== Personal life ==
Francis Forster married Helen Dorothy Kiley, a social worker, in 1937. They had five children together: Denis, Mark, Susan, Kathleen, and Marianne. His wife predeceased him in July 2004. The Forsters are buried in St. Mary's Cemetery in Cincinnati.
