= Anson Frericks =

American business executive

- Born: c. 1984 (age c. 40); Cincinnati, Ohio, United States
- Education: Yale University (AB); Harvard University (MBA)
- Occupation: Business executive
- Known for: Anheuser-Busch Inbev and Strive Asset Management

Anson Frericks (born c. 1984) is an American business executive. From 2011 to 2022, he worked for Anheuser-Busch Inbev and was president of Anheuser-Busch Sales & Distribution Co.

== Early life ==
Frericks attended St. Xavier High School in Cincinnati, Ohio from 1998 to 2002. He enrolled at Yale University from 2002 to 2006, graduating with a double major in history and political science. He played varsity lacrosse at Yale and was elected team captain for the 2005–2006 season. From 2006 to 2009, he worked as an associate at Summit Partners. During business school, he interned at Citadel. In 2011, Frericks obtained an MBA from Harvard Business School.

== Career ==
After graduating from HBS, Frericks joined Anheuser-Busch Inbev. He worked there from 2011 to 2022, finishing his career as president of Anheuser-Busch Sales & Distribution Co.

Afterwards, he helped launch Strive Asset Management, a financial company. He co-founded Strive with a friend from high school, Vivek Ramaswamy. Frericks is the co-founder and president of Strive. Strive now manages over $1 billion of assets.

As Anheuser-Busch's former president of sales, during the aftermath of the 2023 Bud Light boycott, Frericks has repeatedly given interviews in Fox Business and other media outlets commenting on Anheuser-Busch's failure to remediate the brand's public perception and declining sales. He has called for Anheuser-Busch's current CEO of North America, Brendan Whitworth, to step down as a path to improve the long-term profitability of the business.

Previously, as co-founder and president of Strive Asset Management, Anson wrote to Salesforce CEO Marc Benioff, criticizing his commitment to stakeholder capitalism while Salesforce earnings missed analyst expectations. He appeared on CNBC and other media outlets to discuss his letter.

In February 2025, Frericks published a book titled Last Call for Bud Light: The Fall and Future of America's Favorite Beer.

== Publications ==
Frericks has written op-eds for the Wall Street Journal, The Free Press, Fox Business, and the New York Times.

In 2025, he published the following book.

- Frericks, Anson (2025). Last Call for Bud Light. Threshold Editions. ISBN 978-1-6680-7090-1.

== Media ==
Frericks has appeared in the following television series:

- Eric Bolling The Balance (2023)
- Jesse Watters Primetime (2023)
- CNBC Squawk on the Street (2023)

He has also appeared on podcasts with Mike Rowe and Adam Carolla, as well as on television programs such as Varney & Co. and Fox & Friends.

== See also ==
- 2023 Bud Light boycott
- Vivek Ramaswamy
