= Political positions of the 2016 United States presidential candidates by political affiliation =

The United States presidential candidates in the 2016 United States presidential candidates by political affiliation hold a wide variety of stances on issues related to domestic and foreign policy and their political ideological views.

== Domestic policy ==
=== Capital punishment ===
| Political party | Democratic Party | | Republican Party | | Libertarian Party | Green Party |
| Candidate | Hillary Clinton | | Donald Trump | | Gary Johnson | Jill Stein |
|---|---|---|---|---|---|---|
| Federal capital punishment | Yes | Unitary state position | Yes | Unitary state position | No | No |

=== LGBTQ rights ===
Executive positions

| Political party | Democratic Party | | Republican Party | | Libertarian Party | | Green Party |
| Candidate | Hillary Clinton | | Donald Trump | | Gary Johnson | | Jill Stein |
|---|---|---|---|---|---|---|---|
| Arizona Senate Bill 1062 | No | | Unknown | | Unknown | | Unknown |
| Burwell v. Hobby Lobby | No | | Yes | | Unknown | | Unknown |
| Cap out-of pocket expenses for people with HIV/AIDS | Yes | | Unknown | | Unknown | | Unknown |
| Define the term "sex" in federal statute, federal agencies, and courts to include discrimination on the basis of "sexual orientation" and "gender identity" | Yes | | Unknown | | Unknown | | Unknown |
| Equality Act of 2015 | Yes | | Unknown | | Unknown | | Unknown |
| Executive Order 13672 | Yes | | Unknown | | Unknown | | Yes |
| Every Child Deserves a Family Act | Yes | | Unknown | | Unknown | | Unknown |
| Expand the utilization of HIV prevention medications, including pre-exposure prophylaxis (PrEP) | Yes | | Unknown | | Unknown | | Unknown |
| H.R. 2802 and S. 1598 | Unknown | | Yes | | Unknown | | Unknown |
| Indiana Senate Bill 101 | No | | Unknown | | Unknown | | Unknown |
| Kansas Senate Bill 175 | No | | Unknown | | Unknown | | Unknown |
| Law enforcement training on interactions with LGBT individuals. | Yes | | Unknown | | Unknown | | Unknown |
| LGBT Data Inclusion Act | Yes | | Unknown | | Unknown | | Unknown |
| LGBTQ adoption | No | Unitary state position | Unknown | Federalist position | Unknown | | Unknown |
| Medicaid expansion under the Patient Protection and Affordable Care Act | Yes | | Unknown | | Unknown | | Unknown |
| Mississippi House Bill 1523 | No | | Unknown | | Unknown | | Unknown |
| North Carolina House Bill 2 | No | Unitary state position | Yes | Federalist position | Unknown | | Unknown |
| Obergefell v. Hodges | No | Unitary state position | No | Federalist position | Unknown | | Unknown |
| Proposition 1 | Yes | | Unknown | | Unknown | | Unknown |
| Reporting of hate crimes data based on a victim's actual or perceived sexual orientation and gender identity | Yes | Unitary state position (federally collected data only); Federalist position (state and territorial collected data only) | Unknown | | Unknown | | Unknown |
| Runaway and Homeless Youth and Trafficking Prevention Act | Yes | | Unknown | | Unknown | | Unknown |
| Safe Schools Improvement Act | Yes | | Unknown | | Unknown | | Unknown |
| Same-sex marriage | Yes | Unitary state position | No | Federalist position | Yes | Unitary state position | Yes |
| Shelby County v. Holder | No | | Unknown | | Unknown | | Unknown |
| Student Non-Discrimination Act | Yes | | Unknown | | Unknown | | Unknown |
| Transgender individuals to change their gender marker on identification documents | Yes | Unitary state position (federally issued identification documentations only); Federalist position (state and territorial issued identification documentations only) | Unknown | | Unknown | | Unknown |
| U.S. Department of Defense regulations allowing transgender people to openly serve in the U.S. military | Yes | | Unknown | | Unknown | | Unknown |
| U.S. Department of Justice to require that data be collected on hate crimes committed basis of sexual orientation and gender identity whenever demographic data is collected | Yes | | Unknown | | Unknown | | Unknown |
| Voter ID laws | No | Unitary state position | Yes | Federalist position | Unknown | | No |

Appointments

=== Abortion ===
Executive positions

| Political party | Democratic Party | | Republican Party | | Libertarian Party | | Green Party |
| Candidate | Hillary Clinton | | Donald Trump | | Gary Johnson | | Jill Stein |
|---|---|---|---|---|---|---|---|
| Roe v. Wade | Yes | Unitary state position | No | Federalist position | No | Federalist position | Unknown |

Appointments

== Foreign policy ==
=== Iran ===
| Political party | Democratic Party | Republican Party | Libertarian Party | Green Party |
| Candidate | Hillary Clinton | Donald Trump | Gary Johnson | Jill Stein |
|---|---|---|---|---|
| Iran Deal | Yes | No | No | Unknown |

== Political ideologies ==
| Political party | Democratic Party | Republican Party | Libertarian Party | Green Party |
| Candidate | Hillary Clinton | Donald Trump | Gary Johnson | Jill Stein |
|---|---|---|---|---|
| As described by themselves | "modern progressive" "moderate" "centrist" "progressive who gets things done" | "liberal on healthcare" "commonsense conservative" | "libertarian" "fiscally conservative" "socially-accepting liberal" | Unknown |

== See also ==
- Political positions of the Democratic Party presidential primary candidates, 2016
- Political positions of the Republican Party presidential primary candidates, 2016
- Political positions of Hillary Clinton
- Political positions of Donald Trump
- Political positions of Gary Johnson
