= Political positions of the 2016 Democratic Party presidential primary candidates =

The Democratic candidates in the 2016 United States presidential election hold a wide variety of stances on issues related to domestic and foreign policy and their political ideological views.

== Domestic policy ==
	Jeff Boss	Harry Braun	Lincoln Chafee (Suspended campaign)	Hillary Clinton	Paul T. Farrell Jr.	Keith Judd	Lawrence Lessig (Suspended campaign)	David Mills	Martin O'Malley (Suspended campaign)	Bernie Sanders	Sam Sloan	Vermin Supreme	Jim Webb (Suspended campaign)	Robby Wells	Willie Wilson	John Wolfe, Jr.
$15 federal minimum wage	Yes	Unknown	Unknown	Unknown	Unknown	Unknown	Unknown	Yes	Yes	Unknown	Unknown	Unknown	No	Unknown	Unknown	
American Taxpayer Relief Act of 2012	Unknown	Unknown	Unknown	Yes	Unknown	Unknown	Unknown	Unknown	Unknown	Yes	Unknown	Unknown	Yes	Unknown	Unknown	Unknown
Cannabis legalization	Yes	Unknown	Yes	Unknown	Unknown	Yes	Yes	Unknown	Unknown	Yes	Unknown	Unknown	Unknown	Unknown	Yes	Unknown
Capital punishment	No	Yes	No	Yes	Unknown	Yes	No	Unknown	No	No	Unknown	Yes	Yes	No	Unknown	Unknown
Cybersecurity Information Sharing Act of 2015	Unknown	Unknown	Unknown	Unknown	Unknown	Unknown	Unknown	Unknown	Yes	No	Unknown	Unknown	Unknown	Unknown	Unknown	Unknown
Deferred Action for Childhood Arrivals	Unknown	Unknown	Unknown	Yes	Unknown	Unknown	Unknown	Unknown	Yes	Yes	Unknown	Unknown	Unknown	Unknown	Unknown	Unknown
Deferred Action for Parents of Americans and Lawful Permanent Residents	Unknown	Unknown	Unknown	Yes	Unknown	Unknown	Unknown	Unknown	Yes	Yes	Unknown	Unknown	Unknown	Unknown	Unknown	Unknown
DREAM Act	Unknown	No	Yes	Yes	Unknown	Unknown	Yes	Unknown	Yes	Yes	Unknown	Unknown	Yes	Unknown	Unknown	Unknown
Equality Act of 2015	Unknown	Unknown	Yes	Yes	Unknown	Unknown	Yes	Unknown	Yes	Yes	Unknown	Unknown	Unknown	Unknown	Unknown	Unknown
Expand Social security	Unknown	Unknown	Unknown	No	Unknown	Unknown	Yes	Unknown	Yes	Yes	Unknown	Unknown	Unknown	Unknown	Unknown	Unknown
Federal ban on conversion therapy for minors on the basis of sexual orientation and gender identity	Unknown	Unknown	Unknown	Yes	Unknown	Unknown	Unknown	Unknown	Yes	Unknown	Unknown	Unknown	Unknown	Unknown	Unknown	Unknown
Lifting the ban on military service for transgender Americans	Unknown	Unknown	Unknown	Yes	Unknown	Unknown	Yes	Unknown	Unknown	Yes	Unknown	Unknown	Unknown	Unknown	Unknown	Unknown
Maintain Obergefell v. Hodges	Unknown	Unknown	Yes	Yes	Unknown	No	Yes	Unknown	Yes	Yes	Unknown	Unknown	Yes	Unknown	Unknown	Unknown
Maintain Roe v. Wade	Unknown	Unknown	Yes	Yes	Unknown	Unknown	Unknown	Unknown	Yes	Yes	Unknown	Unknown	Yes	Unknown	Unknown	Unknown
Merrick Garland Supreme Court nomination	Unknown	Unknown	Unknown	Unknown	Unknown	Unknown	Unknown	Unknown	Unknown	No	Unknown	Unknown	Unknown	Unknown	Unknown	Unknown
National Defense Authorization Act for Fiscal Year 2012	Unknown	Unknown	Unknown	Unknown	Unknown	Unknown	Unknown	Unknown	Unknown	No	Unknown	Unknown	Yes	Unknown	Unknown	Unknown
Overturn Burwell v. Hobby Lobby	Unknown	Unknown	Unknown	Yes	Unknown	Unknown	Unknown	Unknown	Yes	Yes	Unknown	Unknown	Unknown	Unknown	Unknown	Unknown
Overturn Citizens United v. Federal Election Commission	Unknown	Unknown	Unknown	Yes	Unknown	Unknown	Yes	Unknown	Yes	Yes	Unknown	Unknown	Unknown	Unknown	Unknown	Unknown
Pro-choice	Yes	Yes	Yes	Yes	Unknown	No	Unknown	Unknown	Yes	Yes	Unknown	Yes	Yes	No	Unknown	Unknown
Proposition 1	Unknown	Unknown	Unknown	Yes	Unknown	Unknown	Unknown	Unknown	Yes	Yes	Unknown	Unknown	Unknown	Unknown	Unknown	Unknown
Public Facilities Privacy & Security Act	Unknown	Unknown	Unknown	No	Unknown	Unknown	Unknown	Unknown	Unknown	No	Unknown	Unknown	Unknown	Unknown	Unknown	Unknown
Reinstating Glass–Steagall Legislation	Unknown	Unknown	Yes (previously against until October 13, 2015)	No	Unknown	Unknown	Yes	Unknown	Yes	Yes	Unknown	Unknown	Unknown	Unknown	Unknown	Yes
Religious Freedom Restoration Act	Unknown	Unknown	Unknown	No	Unknown	Unknown	Unknown	Unknown	No	No	Unknown	Unknown	Unknown	Unknown	Unknown	Unknown
Religious Liberty Accommodations Act	Unknown	Unknown	Unknown	No	Unknown	Unknown	Unknown	Unknown	Unknown	No	Unknown	Unknown	Unknown	Unknown	Unknown	Unknown
Repeal of Foreign Intelligence Surveillance Act of 1978 Amendments Act of 2008	Unknown	Unknown	Unknown	Yes	Unknown	Unknown	Yes	Unknown	Unknown	Yes	Unknown	Unknown	No	Unknown	Unknown	Unknown
Repeal of USA PATRIOT Act	Yes	Unknown	Yes (previously against until October 13, 2015)	No	Unknown	Unknown	Yes	Unknown	No	Yes	Unknown	Unknown	No	Yes	Unknown	Unknown
Senate Bill 175	Unknown	Unknown	Unknown	No	Unknown	Unknown	Unknown	Unknown	Unknown	No	Unknown	Unknown	Unknown	Unknown	Unknown	Unknown
Single-payer health care	Unknown	Yes	Unknown	No	Unknown	Unknown	Yes	Unknown	Yes	Yes	Unknown	Unknown	Unknown	Unknown	Unknown	Yes
Terrorism Risk Insurance Program Reauthorization Act of 2015	Unknown	Unknown	Unknown	Yes	Unknown	Unknown	Unknown	Unknown	Unknown	No	Unknown	Unknown	Unknown	Unknown	Unknown	Unknown
Tuition-free public college	Unknown	Unknown	Unknown	No	Unknown	Unknown	Unknown	Unknown	No	Yes	Unknown	Unknown	Unknown	Yes	Unknown	Unknown
Update military service records of veterans dismissed due to their sexual orientation	Unknown	Unknown	Unknown	Yes	Unknown	Unknown	Unknown	Unknown	Yes	Yes	Unknown	Unknown	Unknown	Unknown	Unknown	Unknown
Supports same-sex marriage	Yes	Yes	Yes	Yes (previously against)	Unknown	No	Yes	Unknown	Yes	Yes	Unknown	Unknown	Yes	No	No	No
USA Freedom Act	Unknown	Unknown	Unknown	Yes	Unknown	Unknown	Unknown	Unknown	Yes	No (previously supported until June 1, 2015)	Unknown	Unknown	Unknown	Unknown	Unknown	Unknown
Universal background checks	No	No	Unknown	Yes	Unknown	Unknown	Unknown	Unknown	Yes	Yes	Unknown	Unknown	Unknown	No	Unknown	Unknown

== Foreign policy ==
	Jeff Boss	Harry Braun	Lincoln Chafee (Suspended campaign)	Hillary Clinton	Paul T. Farrell Jr.	Keith Judd	Lawrence Lessig (Suspended campaign)	David Mills	Martin O'Malley (Suspended campaign)	Bernie Sanders	Sam Sloan	Vermin Supreme	Jim Webb (Suspended campaign)	Robby Wells	Willie Wilson	John Wolfe, Jr.
Asylum for Syrian Civil War refugees	Unknown	Unknown	Unknown	Yes	Unknown	Unknown	Unknown	Unknown	Yes	Yes	Unknown	Unknown	Unknown	Unknown	Unknown	Unknown
Drone strikes on suspected enemy combatants	Yes	No	No	Yes	Unknown	Yes	Unknown	Unknown	Unknown	Yes	Unknown	Unknown	Unknown	Unknown	Unknown	Unknown
Ending the United States embargo against Cuba	Unknown	Unknown	Yes	Yes	Unknown	Unknown	Unknown	Unknown	Yes	Yes	Unknown	Unknown	Yes	Unknown	Unknown	Unknown
Enlargement of NATO	Unknown	Unknown	Yes	Yes	Unknown	Unknown	Unknown	Unknown	Unknown	No	Unknown	Unknown	Unknown	Unknown	Unknown	Unknown
Iran Nuclear Deal	Unknown	Unknown	Yes	Yes	Unknown	Unknown	Yes	Unknown	Yes	Yes	Yes	Unknown	No	Unknown	Yes	Unknown
Keystone Pipeline System	Unknown	No	Unknown	No (previously undecided until September 22, 2015)	Unknown	Yes	Unknown	Unknown	No	No	Unknown	Unknown	Yes	Unknown	Unknown	Unknown
Maintain some troops in Afghanistan	No	No	Unknown	Yes	Unknown	Unknown	Yes	Unknown	Unknown	Yes	Unknown	Unknown	Unknown	Unknown	Unknown	Unknown
Military intervention against ISIL	Unknown	Unknown	No	Yes	Unknown	Unknown	Unknown	Unknown	Unknown	Yes	Unknown	Unknown	Unknown	Unknown	Unknown	Unknown
Military funding for the Free Syrian Army	Unknown	Unknown	Unknown	Yes	Unknown	Unknown	Unknown	Unknown	Unknown	No	Unknown	Unknown	Unknown	Unknown	Unknown	Unknown
No-fly zone in Syria	Unknown	Unknown	Unknown	Yes	Unknown	Unknown	Yes	Unknown	No	No	Unknown	Unknown	Unknown	Unknown	Unknown	Unknown
Paris Agreement	Unknown	Unknown	Unknown	Yes	Unknown	Unknown	Unknown	Unknown	Yes	No	Unknown	Unknown	Unknown	Unknown	Unknown	Unknown
Sanctions against Iran	Unknown	Unknown	Yes	Yes	Unknown	Unknown	Unknown	Unknown	Yes	Yes	Unknown	Unknown	Yes	Unknown	Unknown	Unknown
Trans-Pacific Partnership	Unknown	Unknown	Yes	No	Unknown	Unknown	No	Unknown	No	No	Unknown	Unknown	Unknown	Unknown	Unknown	Unknown
Two-state solution	Unknown	Unknown	Yes	Yes	Unknown	Unknown	Unknown	Unknown	Yes	Yes	Unknown	Unknown	Unknown	Unknown	Unknown	Unknown

== Political ideologies ==
Note that some of these terms are self-identifiers (in quotation marks): the views linked to may not adequately represent all of their policy stances.

Jeff Boss	Harry Braun	Lincoln Chafee (Suspended campaign)	Hillary Clinton	Paul T. Farrell Jr.	Keith Judd	Lawrence Lessig (Suspended campaign)	David Mills	Martin O'Malley (Suspended campaign)	Bernie Sanders	Sam Sloan	Vermin Supreme	Jim Webb (Suspended campaign)	Robby Wells	Willie Wilson	John Wolfe, Jr.
truther	direct democrat	libertarian-leaning progressive	"progressive"	"conservative"	Unknown	"liberal"	"liberal"	"progressive"	"democratic socialist"	Unknown	"anarchist"	moderate liberal	"eaglist"	social liberal	"progressive"

== See also ==
- Democratic Party presidential candidates, 2016
- Political positions of the Republican Party presidential primary candidates, 2016
