= 2024 United States presidential election in Rhode Island =

- November 5, 2024
- Turnout: 63.5% ▼

Nominee	Kamala Harris	Donald Trump
Party	Democratic	Republican
Home state	California	Florida
Running mate	Tim Walz	JD Vance
Electoral vote	4	0
Popular vote	285,156	214,406
Percentage	55.54%	41.76%

Harris
40–50%
50–60%
60–70%
70–80%
80–90%
90–100%
Trump
40–50%
50–60%
60–70%
No data
President before election
Joe Biden
Democratic
Elected President
Donald Trump
Republican

The 2024 United States presidential election in Rhode Island was held on Tuesday, November 5, 2024, as part of the 2024 United States elections in which all 50 states plus the District of Columbia participated. Rhode Island voters chose electors to represent them in the Electoral College via a popular vote. The state of Rhode Island has four electoral votes in the Electoral College.

A New England state, Rhode Island has not voted for a Republican candidate since 1984, when Ronald Reagan won in a 49-state landslide. It is a blue state, being one of three states (along with Hawaii and Massachusetts) in 2020 to have every county vote for Democrat Joe Biden.

Although Harris won the state comfortably, including every county, this was the closest election in Rhode Island since 1988, with Trump decreasing his margin of defeat by 7% compared to 2020. This was the first time a Republican nominee won over 40% in Rhode Island since 1988.

Trump flipped three municipalities from 2020: Richmond, West Warwick, and Woonsocket, becoming the first Republican to win the latter since Ronald Reagan in 1984.

== Primary elections ==
=== Republican primary ===
The Rhode Island Republican primary was held on April 2, 2024, alongside primaries in Connecticut, New York, and Wisconsin.

Rhode Island Republican primary, April 2, 2024
Candidate	Votes	Percentage	Actual delegate count		
Candidate	Votes	Percentage	Bound	Unbound	Total
Donald Trump	10,898	84.5%	17		17
Nikki Haley (withdrawn)	1,371	10.6%	2		2
Uncommitted	257	2.0%			
Ron DeSantis (withdrawn)	178	1.4%			
Chris Christie (withdrawn)	154	1.2%			
Vivek Ramaswamy (withdrawn)	40	0.3%			
Total:	12,898	100.0%	19		19

=== Democratic primary ===
The Rhode Island Democratic primary was held on April 2, 2024, alongside primaries in Connecticut, New York, and Wisconsin.

Rhode Island Democratic primary, April 2, 2024
Candidate	Votes	%	Delegates
Joe Biden (incumbent)	21,336	80.75	25
Uncommitted	3,834	14.51	1
Dean Phillips (withdrawn)	660	2.50	0
Write-in votes	593	2.24	—
Total	26,423	100%	26

== General election ==
=== Predictions ===
Source	Ranking	As of
Cook Political Report	Solid D	December 19, 2023
Inside Elections	Solid D	April 26, 2023
Sabato's Crystal Ball	Safe D	June 29, 2023
Decision Desk HQ/The Hill	Safe D	December 14, 2023
CNalysis	Solid D	December 30, 2023
CNN	Solid D	January 14, 2024
The Economist	Safe D	August 20, 2024
538	Solid D	August 23, 2024
RCP	Solid D	June 26, 2024
NBC News	Safe D	October 6, 2024

=== Polling ===
Kamala Harris vs. Donald Trump

Poll source	Date(s) administered	Sample size (Note: Key: A – all adults RV – registered voters LV – likely voters V – unclear)	Margin of error	Kamala Harris Democratic	Donald Trump Republican	Other / Undecided
MassINC Polling Group (Note: Poll sponsored by Rhode Island Current)	September 12–18, 2024	800 (LV)	± 3.9%	56%	43%	1%

Kamala Harris vs. Donald Trump vs. Cornel West vs. Jill Stein vs. Chase Oliver

Poll source	Date(s) administered	Sample size	Margin of error	Kamala Harris Democratic	Donald Trump Republican	Cornel West Independent	Jill Stein Green	Chase Oliver Libertarian	Other / Undecided
University of New Hampshire	September 12–16, 2024	683 (LV)	± 3.7%	58%	38%	–	2%	0%	2% (Note: "Another candidate" with 1%; "Don't know/Not sure" with 1%)

Kamala Harris vs. Donald Trump vs. Robert F. Kennedy Jr. vs. Cornel West vs. Jill Stein vs. Chase Oliver

Poll source	Date(s) administered	Sample size	Margin of error	Kamala Harris Democratic	Donald Trump Republican	Robert F. Kennedy Jr. Independent	Cornel West Independent	Jill Stein Green	Chase Oliver Libertarian	Other / Undecided
MassINC Polling Group	September 12–18, 2024	800 (LV)	± 3.9%	53%	40%	2%	0%	1%	–	4%

Kamala Harris vs. Donald Trump vs. Robert F. Kennedy Jr.

Poll source	Date(s) administered	Sample size	Margin of error	Kamala Harris Democratic	Donald Trump Republican	Robert F. Kennedy Jr. Independent	Other / Undecided
University of Rhode Island/YouGov	August 15 – September 8, 2024	500 (A)	± 6.0%	53%	27%	9%	11% (Note: "Another candidate" with 1%)

Hypothetical polling with Joe Biden and Donald Trump

Joe Biden vs. Donald Trump

Poll source	Date(s) administered	Sample size	Margin of error	Joe Biden Democratic	Donald Trump Republican	Other / Undecided
University of New Hampshire	May 16–20, 2024	538 (LV)	± 4.2%	60%	40%	–
John Zogby Strategies (Note: Poll conducted for Kennedy's campaign)	April 13–21, 2024	398 (LV)	–	48%	43%	9%
Fleming & Associates (Note: Poll sponsored by WPRI-TV & Roger Williams University)	September 29 – October 2, 2022	402 (LV)	± 4.9%	49%	32%	19%
Echelon Insights (Note: Poll sponsored by NetChoice)	August 31 – September 7, 2022	373 (LV)	± 6.1%	51%	37%	12%

Joe Biden vs. Donald Trump vs. Robert F. Kennedy Jr. vs. Cornel West vs. Jill Stein

Poll source	Date(s) administered	Sample size	Margin of error	Joe Biden Democratic	Donald Trump Republican	Robert F. Kennedy Jr. Independent	Cornel West Independent	Jill Stein Green	Other / Undecided
University of New Hampshire	May 16–20, 2024	538 (LV)	± 4.2%	52%	33%	6%	1%	0%	8%

Joe Biden vs. Donald Trump vs. Robert F. Kennedy Jr.

Poll source	Date(s) administered	Sample size	Margin of error	Joe Biden Democratic	Donald Trump Republican	Robert F. Kennedy Jr. Independent	Other / Undecided
Embold Research (Note: Poll sponsored by Salve Regina University)	June 5–14, 2024	1,450 (LV)	± 2.8%	40%	33%	12%	15%

Hypothetical polling with other candidates

Joe Biden vs. Robert F. Kennedy Jr.

Poll source	Date(s) administered	Sample size	Margin of error	Joe Biden Democratic	Robert F. Kennedy Jr. Independent	Other / Undecided
John Zogby Strategies	April 13–21, 2024	398 (LV)	–	40%	48%	12%

Robert F. Kennedy Jr. vs. Donald Trump

Poll source	Date(s) administered	Sample size	Margin of error	Robert F. Kennedy Jr. Independent	Donald Trump Republican	Other / Undecided
John Zogby Strategies	April 13–21, 2024	398 (LV)	–	46%	40%	14%

Joe Biden vs. Ron DeSantis

Poll source	Date(s) administered	Sample size	Margin of error	Joe Biden Democratic	Ron DeSantis Republican	Other / Undecided
Echelon Insights	August 31 – September 7, 2022	373 (LV)	± 6.1%	47%	36%	17%

=== Results ===
State House district results: Trump 50–60% 60–70% / Harris 40–50% 50–60% 60–70% 70–80% 80–90%

State Senate district results: Trump 50–60% / Harris 40–50% 50–60% 60–70% 70–80% 80–90%

2024 United States presidential election in Rhode Island
Party	Candidate	Votes	%	±%
Democratic	Kamala Harris; Tim Walz	285,156	55.54%	▼3.85%
Republican	Donald Trump; JD Vance	214,406	41.76%	▲3.15%
Independent	Robert F. Kennedy Jr. (withdrawn); Nicole Shanahan (withdrawn)	5,045	0.98%	N/A
Green	Jill Stein; Butch Ware	2,900	0.56%	N/A
Libertarian	Chase Oliver; Mike ter Maat	1,617	0.31%	▼0.67%
Socialism and Liberation	Claudia De la Cruz; Karina Garcia	1,176	0.23%	▲0.07%
Party	Robby Wells; Tony Jones	359	0.07%	N/A
Write-in		2,727	0.53%	Steady
Total votes		513,386	100.00%	N/A

==== By county ====
County	Kamala Harris Democratic		Donald Trump Republican		Various candidates Other parties		Margin		Total
County	#	%	#	%	#	%	#	%	Total
Bristol	17,458	61.61%	10,048	35.46%	829	2.93%	7,410	26.15%	28,335
Kent	46,269	49.67%	44,526	47.80%	2,353	2.53%	1,743	1.87%	93,148
Newport	27,332	61.26%	16,027	35.92%	1,259	2.82%	11,305	25.34%	44,618
Providence	150,102	55.66%	112,443	41.70%	7,134	2.64%	37,659	13.96%	269,679
Washington	42,589	56.01%	31,247	41.10%	2,200	2.89%	11,342	14.91%	76,036
Totals	283,750	55.44%	214,291	41.87%	13,775	2.69%	69,459	13.57%	511,816

==== By congressional district ====
Harris won both congressional districts.

District	Harris	Trump	Representative
1st	59.64%	37.63%	Gabe Amo
2nd	52.06%	45.28%	Seth Magaziner

== See also ==
- United States presidential elections in Rhode Island
- 2024 United States presidential election
- 2024 Democratic Party presidential primaries
- 2024 Republican Party presidential primaries
- 2024 United States elections
- Party Party of Rhode Island

== Notes ==
Partisan clients
