= 2024 Reform National Convention =

Reform Party USA National Convention for the 2024 Presidential Election

- 2024 presidential election
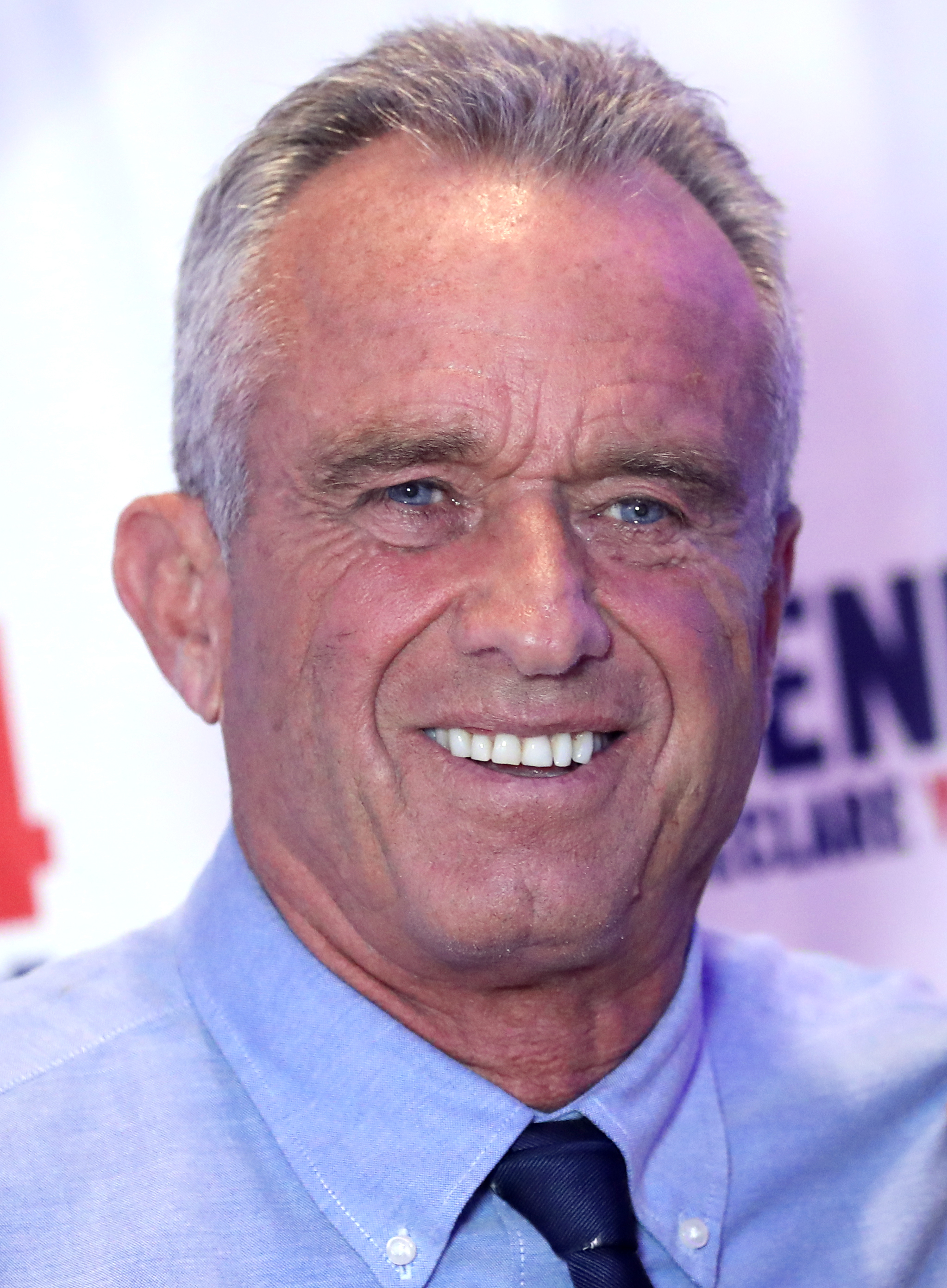
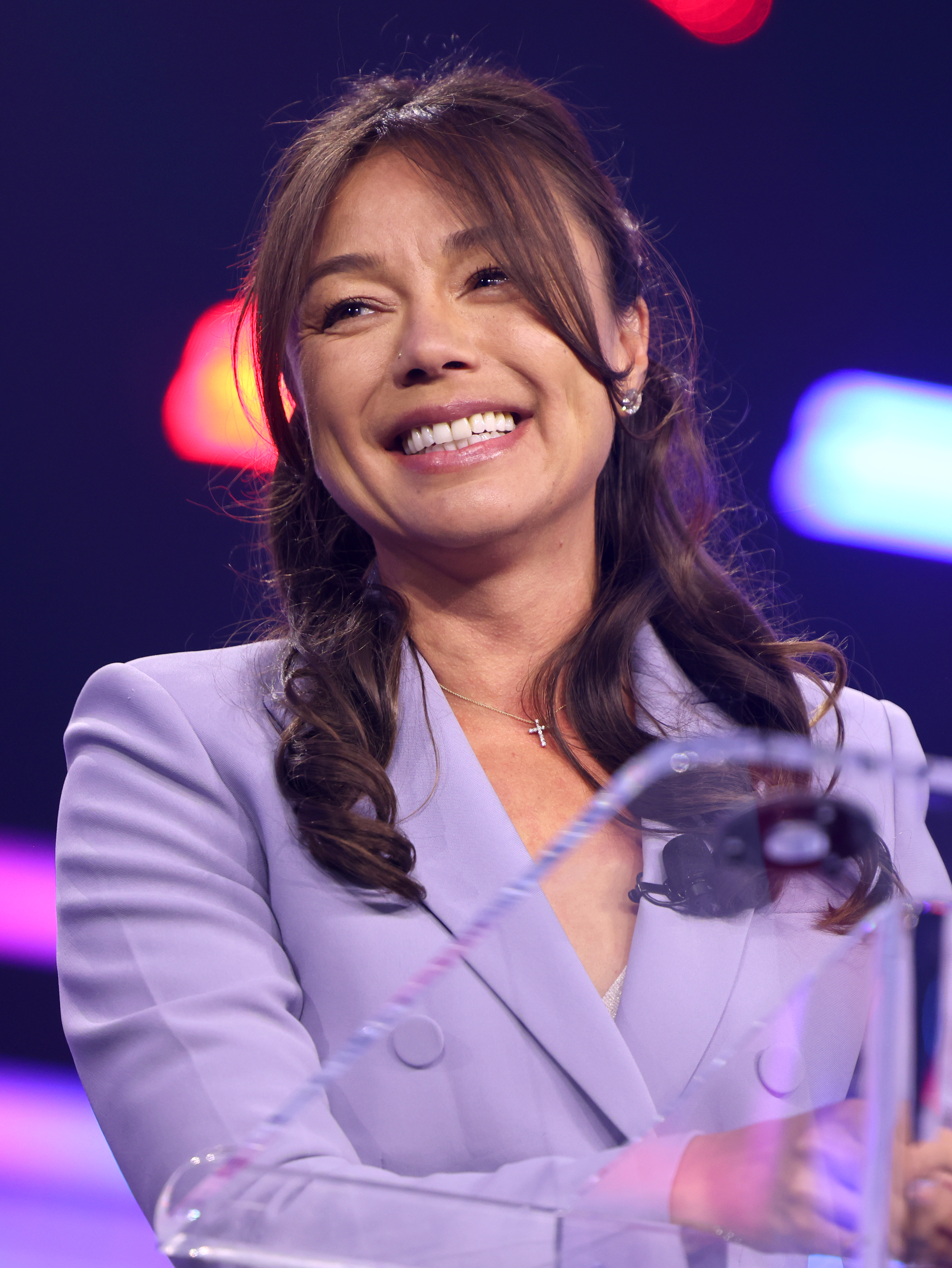
- Nominees (Kennedy and Shanahan)

Convention
- Dates: May 23, 2024

Candidates
- Presidential nominee: Robert F. Kennedy Jr. of California
- Vice-presidential nominee: Nicole Shanahan of California

On May 23, 2024, the Reform Party of the United States of America selected Robert F. Kennedy Jr. as its 2024 nominee for President of the United States at its convention. Kennedy withdrew his candidacy on August 23, 2024, and was removed as the Reform Party's presidential nominee.

The Reform Party of Florida regained its ballot access in June 2024, giving Kennedy and his vice presidential nominee, Nicole Shanahan, a spot on the Florida presidential ballot. There was little opposition to the nomination, with the only objection coming from a group of self-described "Reform Party activists" requesting another convention.

== Presidential nomination ==
=== Withdrew after Convention ===
Name	Born	Experience	Home state	Running mate	Ref.
Robert F. Kennedy Jr.	January 17, 1954 (age 72); Washington D.C.	Environmentalist and founder of Waterkeeper Alliance	New York	Nicole Shanahan	

=== Withdrew before Convention ===
Name	Born	Experience	Home state	Ref.
Tony Jones (Note: Withdrew to run for Rhode Island state representative and Narragansett Town Council. Jones was later nominated by the Party Party of Rhode Island as their vice-presidential nominee)	Unknown	Adjunct professor at Queens College of Theology; Founder of the Party Party of Rhode Island; Former contributor to Independent Political Report	Rhode Island	

=== Declined ===
The following candidates were subject to speculation about their potential candidacies, but did not announce a campaign.

- Nicholas Hensley, Chairman of the Reform Party of America (2014–present)
