= AllatRa =

International new religious movement

- Міжнародний громадський рух «АллатРа»
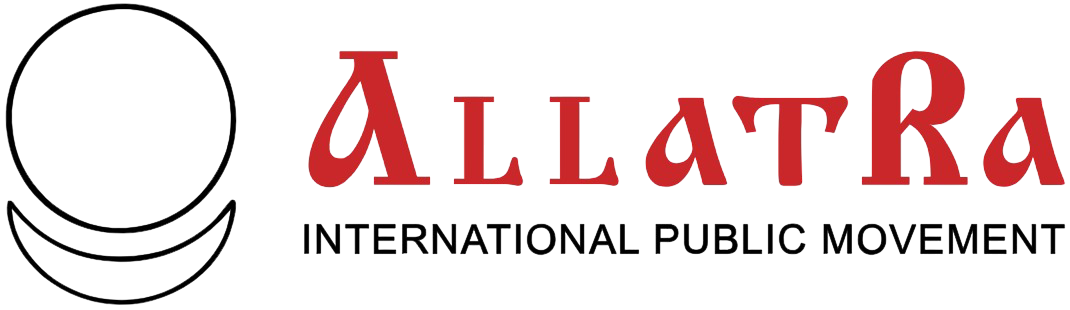
- Logo
- Type: New religious movement
- Classification: Syncretic spiritual movement
- Leader: Igor Danilov
- President: Maryna Ovtsynova
- Region: International
- Headquarters: Atlanta, Georgia, United States
- Founder: Lagoda, AllatRa LLC
- Origin: 15 July 2014; Ukraine
- Official website: allatra.org creativesociety.com

AllatRa, officially ALLATRA International Public Movement (Ukrainian: Міжнародний громадський рух «АллатРа»), is an international new religious movement founded in Ukraine and officially registered in 2014. In 2017, its headquarters were relocated to Atlanta, United States.

Its tradition is syncretic, including Slavic-inspired contemporary pagan elements alongside elements of Theosophy. It follows both a written and oral tradition, the latter supplemented by published videos. Since 2019, the movement has presented itself primarily through its project Creative Society, a media-oriented initiative focused on societal development and ecology.

AllatRa has been characterized as a cult by many media organizations and experts. It has also faced criticism for promoting pseudoscientific claims concerning climate change, natural disasters, geophysical processes and nanoplastics. Certain practices of the movement, such as reported group sex rituals, have also been criticized by various media organizations.

== History ==
Around 2003, the book Sensei. The Original of Shambhala was published under the pseudonym Anastasia Novykh, with Galina Yablochkina considered to be the actual author. Some sources identify Igor Danilov, Yablochkina's colleague, as the protagonist Rigden (in the writings of Helena Blavatsky and Nicholas Roerich, Rigden Jappo is the ruler of Shambhala, a mythical country in Tibet), who is described as a prophet and claimed to have divine qualities. In the following years, a number of similar books were published under the name Anastasia Novykh. The books claimed that Danilov could fly, talk with God and resurrect people.

In 2012, the trademark AllatRa was registered. On 15 July 2014, the organization was officially founded as the ALLATRA International Public Movement by Lagoda, a personal development center, and AllatRa LLC, a publishing house founded by Galina Yablochkina. The main purpose of AllatRa during its early years was to promote books authored by Yablochkina. Her works claimed to provide readers with "exclusive information about self-knowledge and secrets hidden from society".

The organization started creating branches in other countries and registering accounts on social media to promote its ideology. Members of AllatRa, who claimed to be health professionals, promoted the organization in schools and hospitals. AllatRa and its associates are present in various countries: Russia, Ukraine, Belarus, Czechia, United Kingdom, Romania, Moldova, Bulgaria, Switzerland, Canada and the United States. In 2020, AllatRa reportedly spread to Belize and to Cyprus in 2021. AllatRa operates websites and online media channels, including Allatra TV.

In 2017, the main office of AllatRa was relocated from Kyiv, Ukraine, where its headquarters had been located in 2014, to Atlanta, United States. At this time, it established the associated 501(c)(3) public charity AllatRa IPM USA Inc., with Maryna Ovtsynova serving as its president.

In 2019, AllatRa held an online conference where it announced the foundation of Creative Society. AllatRa later held a conference in Prague during which the president of Creative Society, Olga Schmidt, said the goal of her organization is to be an "independent, non-political, and non-religious project" that focuses on the climate crisis and discusses solutions for the issue. Creative Society was registered as a nonprofit organization in California, United States, in June 2022.

Ukrainian authorities blocked more than 20 centers in 2023. Separate administrative proceedings seeking the movement’s dissolution had been initiated earlier. However, in 2025, a Ukrainian court rejected the lawsuit seeking to ban the AllatRa, and in February 2026, the appellate administrative court upheld that decision. In 2023, Russia designated the organization as "undesirable," followed by its adding to the list of extremist and terrorist organizations in 2025.

Politician and American football coach Robby Wells has been associated with AllatRa and the Creative Society since 2019 and served as a spokesperson for the organizations. He ran for US president in the 2020 Democratic Party primaries. He presents himself as a foreign correspondent for Russia Today and believes the AllatRa project is the world’s only salvation. Pastor and politician Mark Burns has also been associated with both organizations since at least 2025. An AllatRa spokesperson Allen Egon Cholakian serves as AllatRa's lobbyist in US Congress. When Cholakian registered as a foreign agent in June 2024, he said that he will focus on "lifting the religious cult designation" by Ukraine and Russia.

In June 2024, Ovtsynova and Cholakian attended a conference organized by the Pontifical Foundation Centesimus Annus Pro Pontifice (CAPP), which promotes Catholic social teaching. During the event, they met with Pope Francis and Ovtsynova handed him Creative Society's climate report which predicts that the world will end in 2036. In May 2025, one month after the death of Pope Francis, Cholakian participated as a panelist at another conference organized by the same foundation, where Pope Leo XIV addressed the participants.

AllatRa members have participated in the United Nations Climate Change Conferences COP29 in Azerbaijan (2024) and COP30 in Brazil (2025), as well as the Bonn Climate Change Conference (2025) and the United Nations conferences on biodiversity and desertification. AllatRa founded a ALLATRA Global Research Center (ALLATRA GRC), which serves as the organization's think tank and research arm. The center has organized public events since at least early 2026. Investigative outlets have described the center as spreading pseudoscientific claims about climate change (by promoting cosmoclimatologist views), natural disasters, geophysical processes, nanoplastics and often presenting them in a scientific format while advancing the organization's broader narratives.

== Beliefs ==
The core sacred texts of AllatRa are a series of books authored by Galina Yablochkina under the pen name Anastasia Novykh. Drawing from a variety of traditions, the beliefs of the group incorporate millenarianism, reincarnation, an abstract life-force similar to Qi called Allat, and a divine pantheon of God and Satan. It also professes the presence of extraterrestrial life on Earth throughout history, particularly a benevolent race of ancient astronauts called Annunaki, and a corresponding malevolent race called Apexians. The group has academically published claims that a "septon field" is responsible for periodic geological and climatic events.

According to a professor of the Kyiv Theological Academy, AllatRa has cult-like characteristics. He said Igor Danilov is a guru of AllatRa and may be responsible for authoring or co-authoring AllatRa's books published under the name "Anastasia Novykh". Books of Allatra contain a theory about the coming end of the world, an apocalypse, and volcanic explosions. The texts said the only way to save humanity is to unite under Creative Society. A number of books featured a character named "Nomo", whose image was apparently inspired by Russian President Vladimir Putin. The books described Nomo as a "savior" of the Slavic civilization who is fighting against the Western world. He was introduced as the future leader of a nation that will fight "archonts" who planned to create a world government headed by NATO and enslave humanity.

== International responses ==
=== Russia ===
Russia declared AllatRa undesirable in August 2023 due to its alleged pro-Ukrainian views. In December 2024, Russian authorities conducted raids of several apartments belonging to members of the AllatRa; police confiscated a number of items and made arrests. In January 2025, the FSB detained seven members in Krasnoyarsk Krai. On June 24, 2025, a Russian court designated AllatRa as an extremist organization, it alleged that its members received "instructions from their Ukrainian supervisors" and that AllatRa members were "forcing Russian citizens to commit extremist crimes". The court banned the organization's activities. In April 2025, Russian authorities fined a married couple 5,000 rubles for organizing meetings for members of the organization and being in possession of the newspaper Sokrovennik, allegedly affiliated with AllatRa. In October 2025, Rosfinmonitoring added the AllatRa movement to its list of extremist and terrorist organizations.

=== Ukraine ===
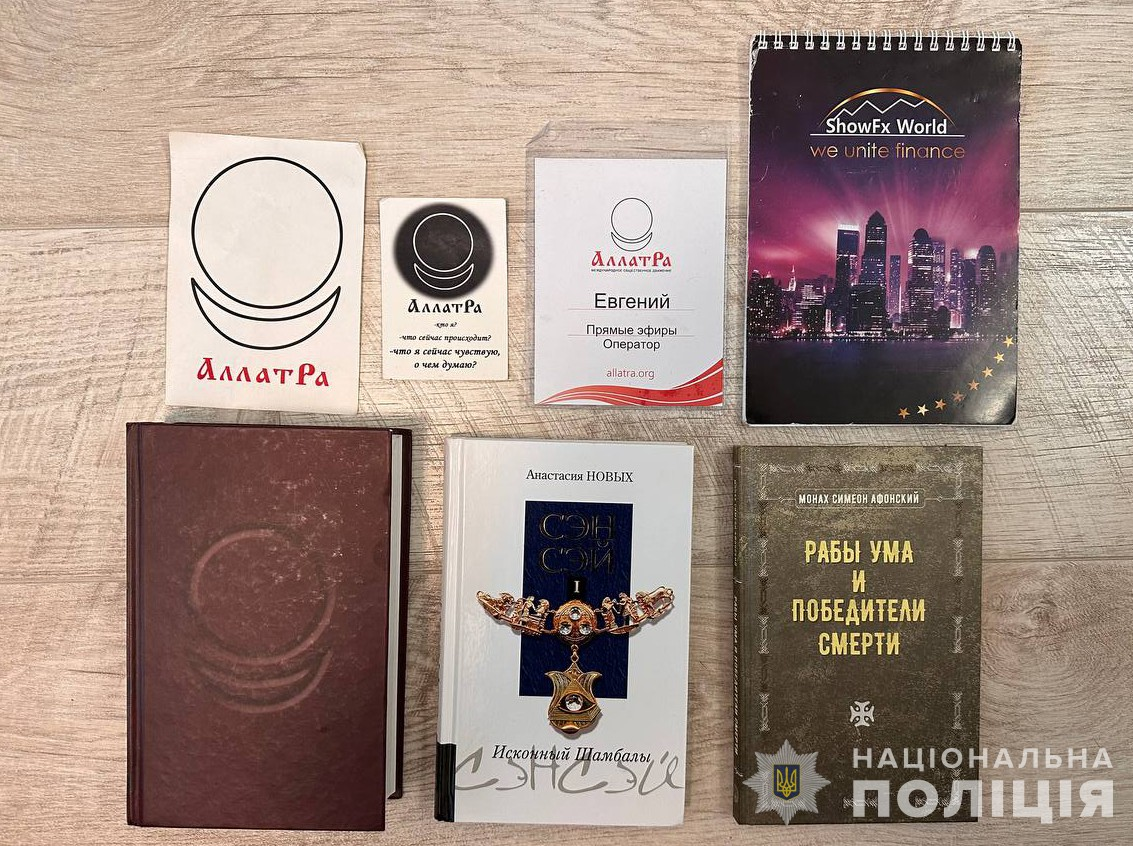
Materials seized by NPU and SBU during a search of AllatRa's offices in 2023

In 2017, the organization also came under criticism from the Ukrainian Orthodox Church of the Kyiv Patriarchate, which called its activities "destructive". The church's diocese described AllatRa as a "psychocult". AllatRa has been criticized by the BBC News in 2022 for its claims that the impact of greenhouse gases on climate change is negligible. Some Ukrainian media outlets said that AllatRa may be a second coming of the White Brotherhood cult, with Babel stating that AllatRa's espouses similar ideas.

In November 2023, the Security Service (SBU) and National Police of Ukraine conducted raids and searches across multiple regions, blocking over 20 centers of the AllatRa accused of collaborating with Russian special services, spreading pro-Kremlin propaganda to justify Russia's aggression in the Russo-Ukrainian war, and promoting a "union of Slavic peoples" under Moscow's leadership. SBU seized documents, weapons, and books from the series Project Russia from AllatRa's offices.

The organization's leader, Igor Danilov, and several associates were charged with high treason, creating a criminal organization, propagating communism, and justifying armed aggression. Despite multiple summonses, Danilov failed to appear for questioning by Ukrainian authorities. In December 2023, a warrant was issued for his arrest, and he was subsequently listed as an internationally wanted individual, along with six associates linked to AllatRa.

According to Ukrainian police, the leadership of the movement used forged documents to leave for the European Union in the spring of 2022, from where it continues to operate. In December 2023, Igor Danilov, who faces up to life imprisonment in Ukraine, was located by Czech journalists near the Veľká Domaša reservoir in eastern Slovakia. According to reporters from Seznam Zprávy, Danilov came with a group of women, members of the movement referred to as "heavenly birds," who are also accommodated at this location. According to multiple sources, these "heavenly birds" would regularly, multiple times a week, participate in group sex rituals meant to "save humanity and ease the climate crisis" (as according to one source) for Igor Danilov. According to one source, the Slovak newspaper Pravda, information has allegedly leaked that implies the existence of sexual assault being committed inside of AllatRa. Following the discovery of Danilov's presence in Slovakia, it was found that Ukraine had not issued either a European or an international arrest warrant for him, as confirmed by the Slovak Police.

In April 2025, a Ukrainian court dismissed the Ministry of Justice's lawsuit seeking to ban and dissolve AllatRa. In February 2026, the appellate court upheld the decision, finding insufficient admissible evidence and no legal grounds for prohibiting the organization, while noting evidence of its patriotic activities in Ukraine. The Ministry appealed the ruling. In February 2026, the appellate administrative court dismissed the appeal and affirmed the decision of the court of first instance.

In June 2025, a Ukrainian court authorized seizure of virtual assets treated as evidence in an ongoing investigation reportedly connected to AllatRa.

=== Czech Republic ===
In 2024, spokesperson for Czech Ministry of the Interior said that they are aware of AllatRa's and Creative Society's presence and are concerned that their "anti-system conspiracy theories" may radicalize people. He also stated that they are exploring the possibility of Russia using "information channels" of AllatRa and Creative Society to spread its influence. In October 2024, Czech investigative journalist Kristina Cirokova was investigated by Žilina Prosecutor's Office in Slovakia after writing reports about AllatRa. The complaint against her was filed by a man named Martin Kováč, who is suspected of being affiliated with AllatRa. Cirokova was accused of supporting a "movement that aims to undermine fundamental rights". Her lawyer described the accusations as "vague" and that they need further clarification. The prosecutor of the case, Lucia Pavlaninová, was reported to have participated in events organized by AllatRa and accused by some media outlets of supporting the organization. The incident was condemned by Reporters Without Borders and Czech Syndicate of Journalists as harassment of journalists. The IFJ condemned the Slovak authorities’ treatment of the journalists and separately noted that AllatRa had conducted a campaign portraying opponents as ‘anti-cultists’ and Nazis.

In 2025, Seznam Zprávy reported that thousands of social media accounts affiliated with the organization launched a smear campaign against Czech YouTuber and AllatRa critic Jakub Jahl, which began in June of that year. The accounts falsely accused Jahl of being a pedophile, animal abuser and committing child abuse in Africa. The allegations resulted in him receiving international death threats. One of the accounts uploaded a two hour-long "documentary" about Jahl. It featured Tanzanian locals accusing him of spreading Satanism, being LGBT and committing crimes such as raping children. Jahl later filed a police report and lawsuit against the creators of the video. A Prague court provisionally ordered David Bail to remove the video from his Facebook and Rumble accounts. Creative Society member Michal Voska sent an open letter to Charles University, where Jahl is studying, demanding that he be investigated for the video. The police responded and said that the "video footage is not based on the truth". A spokesman of the university said that the video could not be verified.

On 8 June 2026, a conference entitled Radikalizace a hybridní působení v náboženském prostředí (lit. 'Radicalization and Hybrid Action in the Religious Environment') was held in the Chamber of Deputies under the auspices of Deputy Speaker Jan Bartošek. Representatives of the Security Service of Ukraine (SBU) described AllatRa as a transnational movement that poses security risks beyond Ukraine. They alleged that the movement disseminates pro-Russian narratives, has radicalization potential, and has developed organizational and media structures in several countries. SBU representatives said Interpol rejected the request, reportedly because of restrictions concerning cases regarded as political or religious. During the conference, attention was also given to alleged intimidation of critics of the movement. Jakub Jahl was cited as an example, having been the target of an online campaign that accused him of various crimes and misconduct. According to conference participants, Czech police described the campaign as targeted defamation, while no criminal charges were brought.
