= 2004 District of Columbia Democratic presidential primary and caucuses =

The District of Columbia held a primary on January 13, 2004 and caucuses on February 14, 2004 during the 2004 Democratic presidential primary season. Delegates were only allocated in the February 14 caucuses.

== Non-binding primary ==
2004 District of Columbia Democratic presidential primary
- January 13, 2004

Non-binding preference poll
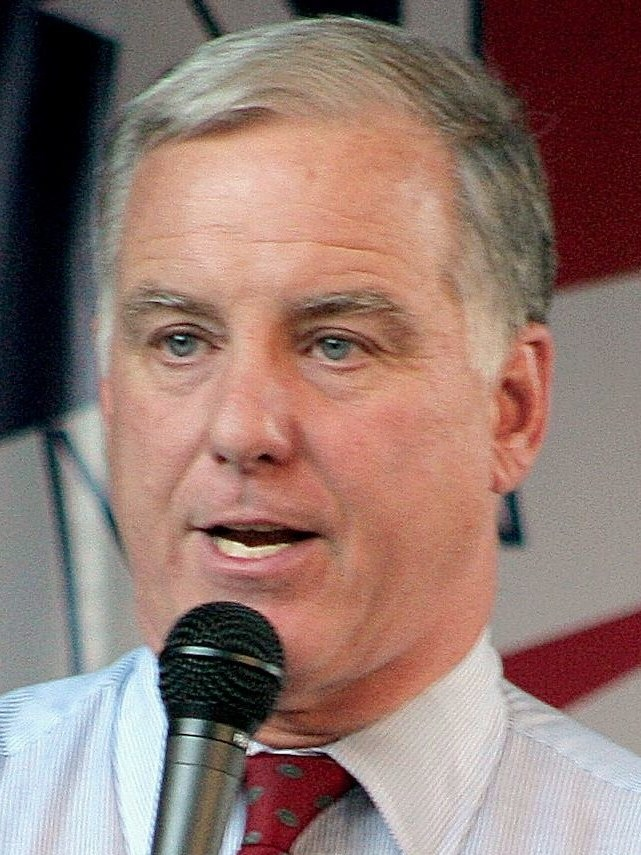

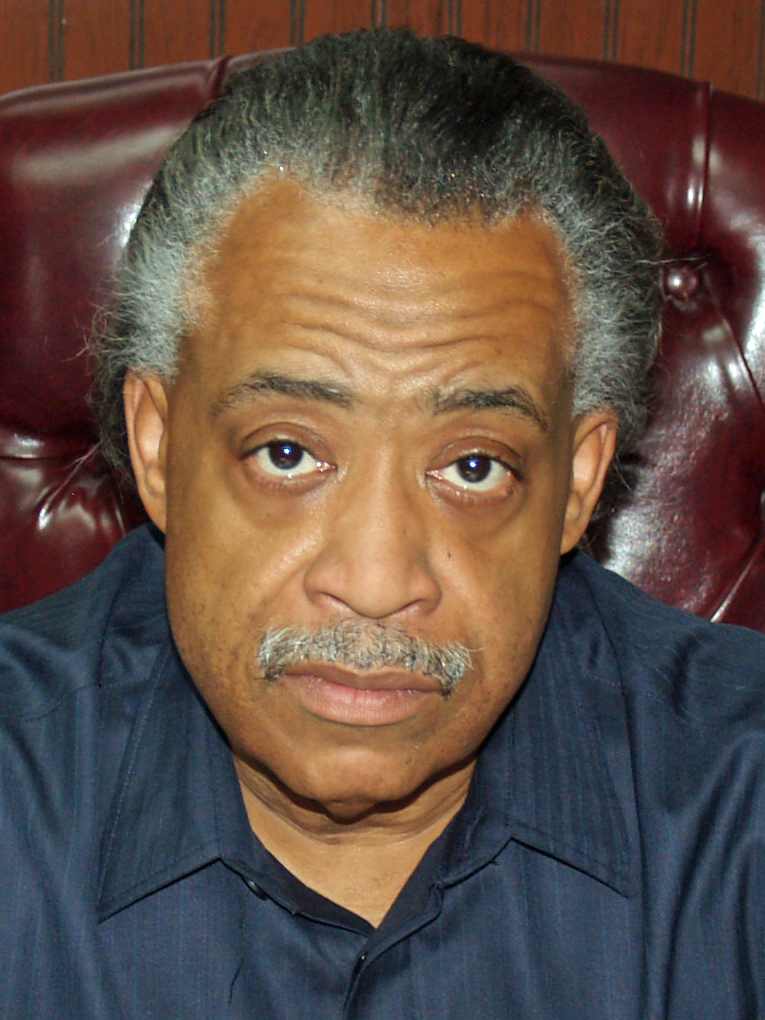

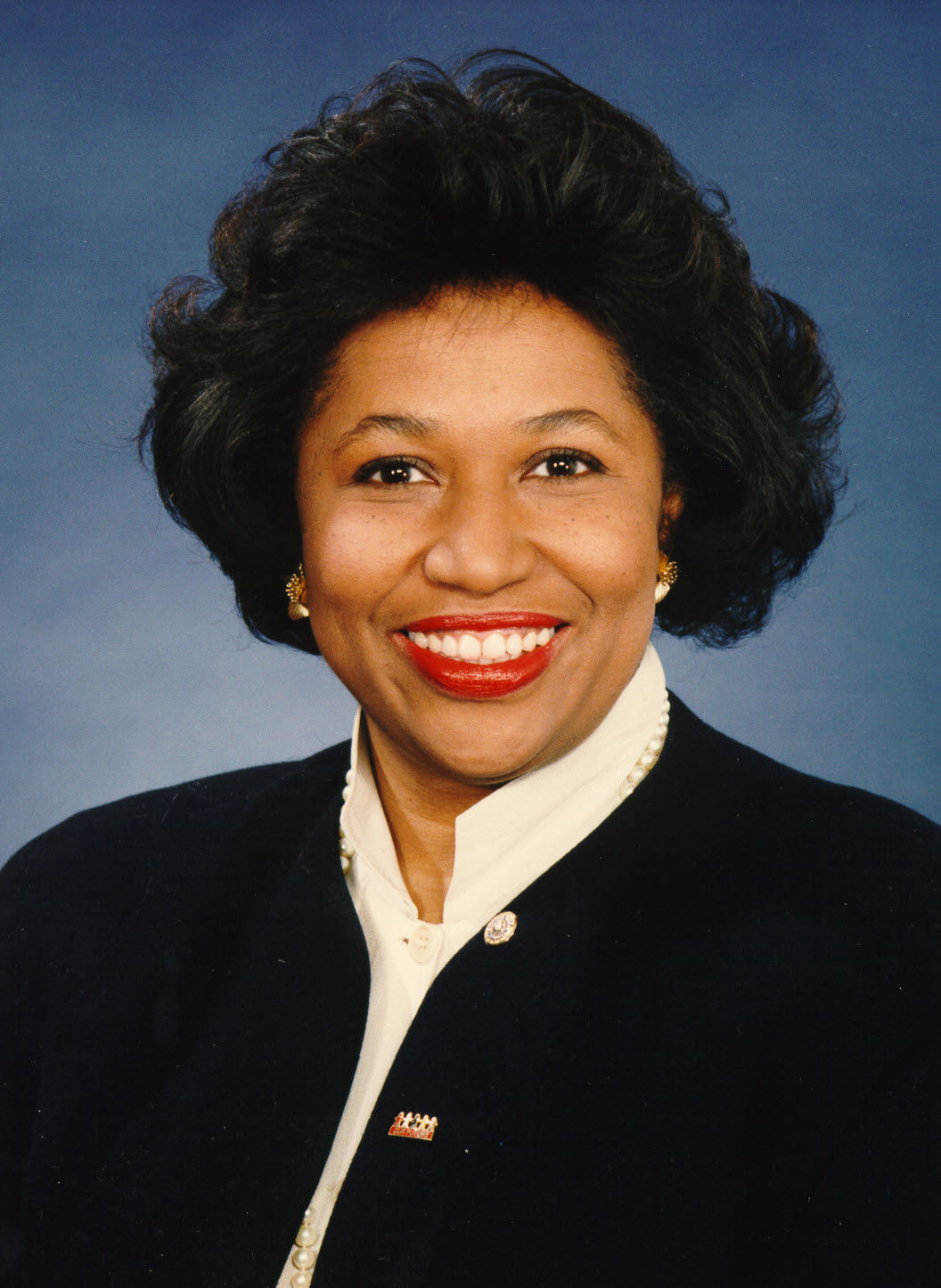

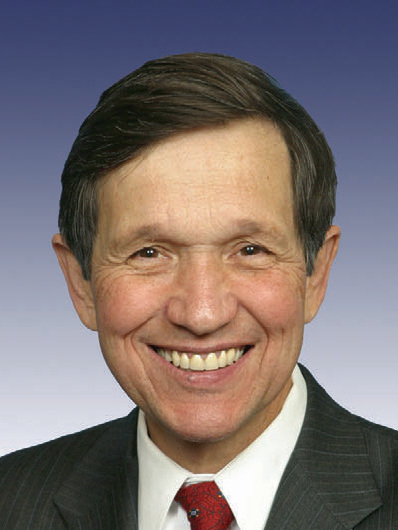
Candidate	Howard Dean	Al Sharpton
Home state	Vermont	New York
Popular vote	18,132	14,639
Percentage	42.65%	34.43%
Candidate	Carol Moseley Braun	Dennis Kucinich
Home state	Illinois	Ohio
Popular vote	4,924	3,481
Percentage	11.58%	8.19%

The primary was held on January 13, 2004, a week before the Iowa caucuses. Early favorite Howard Dean won the primary. Polling two months before had him leading civil rights activist Al Sharpton 45% to 11%. Then his poll numbers went down considerably, to 27% to 5%. The other candidates, John Kerry, John Edwards, Wesley Clark, Dick Gephardt and Joe Lieberman, were not on the ballot. Dean benefited from the endorsement of popular councilman Jack Evans. Following the primary, Carol Moseley Braun dropped out of the race and endorsed Dean.

=== Results ===
2004 District of Columbia Democratic presidential primary
Candidate	Popular vote	
Candidate	Count	Percentage
Howard Dean	18,132	42.65%
Al Sharpton	14,639	34.43%
Carol Moseley Braun	4,924	11.58%
Dennis Kucinich	3,481	8.19%
Lyndon LaRouche	522	1.23%
Florence Walker	257	0.60%
Aurther Jackson	241	0.57%
Vermin Supreme	149	0.35%
Harry Braun	85	0.20%
Jeanne Chebib	46	0.11%
Lucian Wojciechowski	40	0.09%
Total	42,516	100%

== Caucuses ==
2004 District of Columbia Democratic presidential caucuses
- February 14, 2004

39 Democratic National Convention delegates (16 pledged, 23 unpledged) The number of pledged delegates received is determined by the popular vote
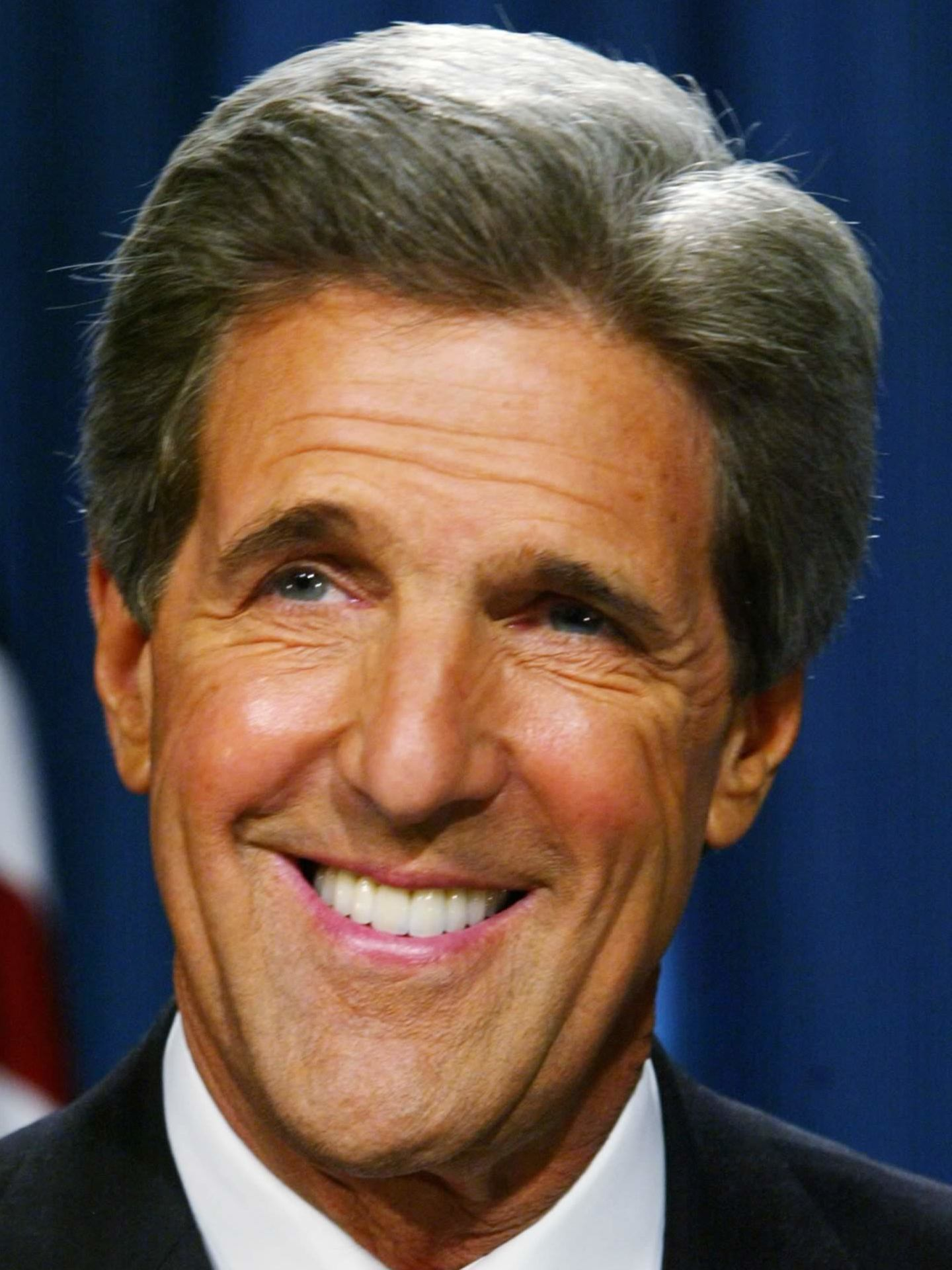

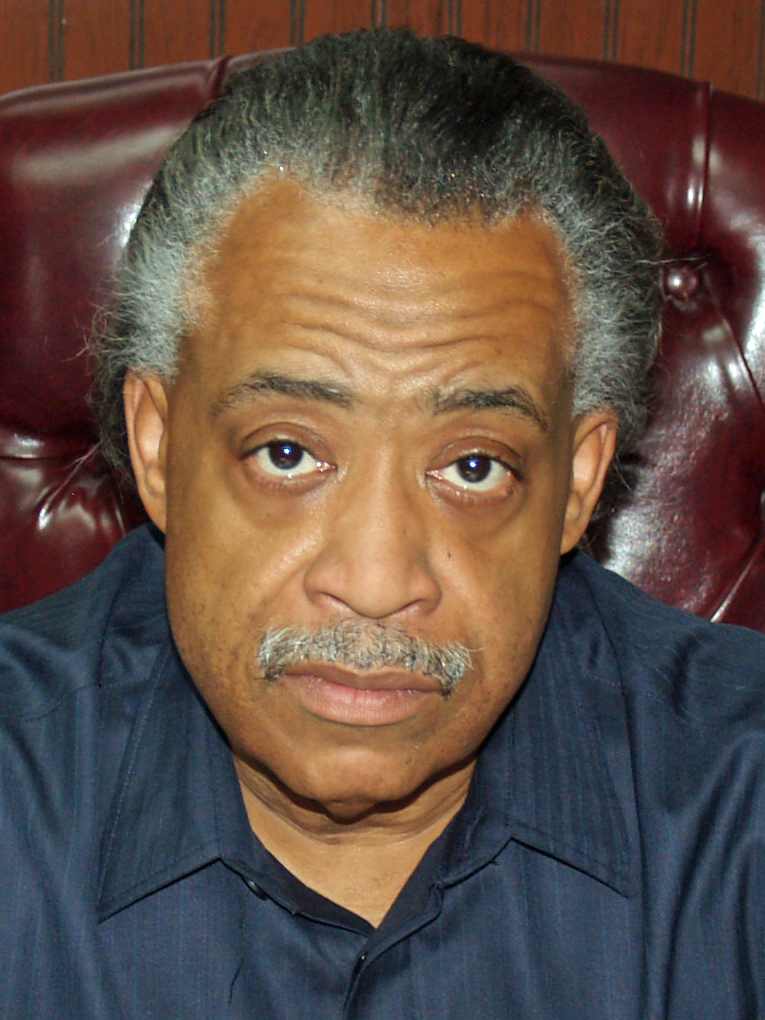

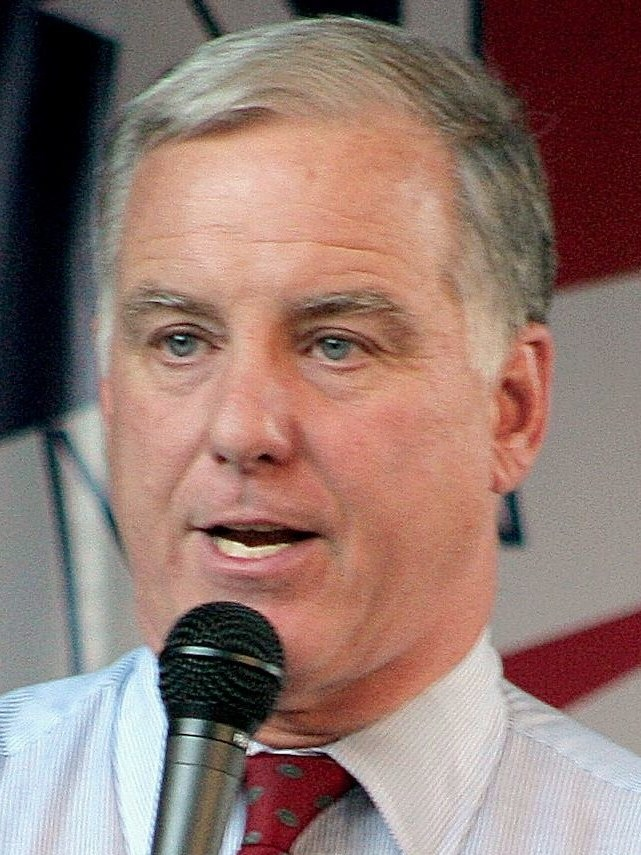

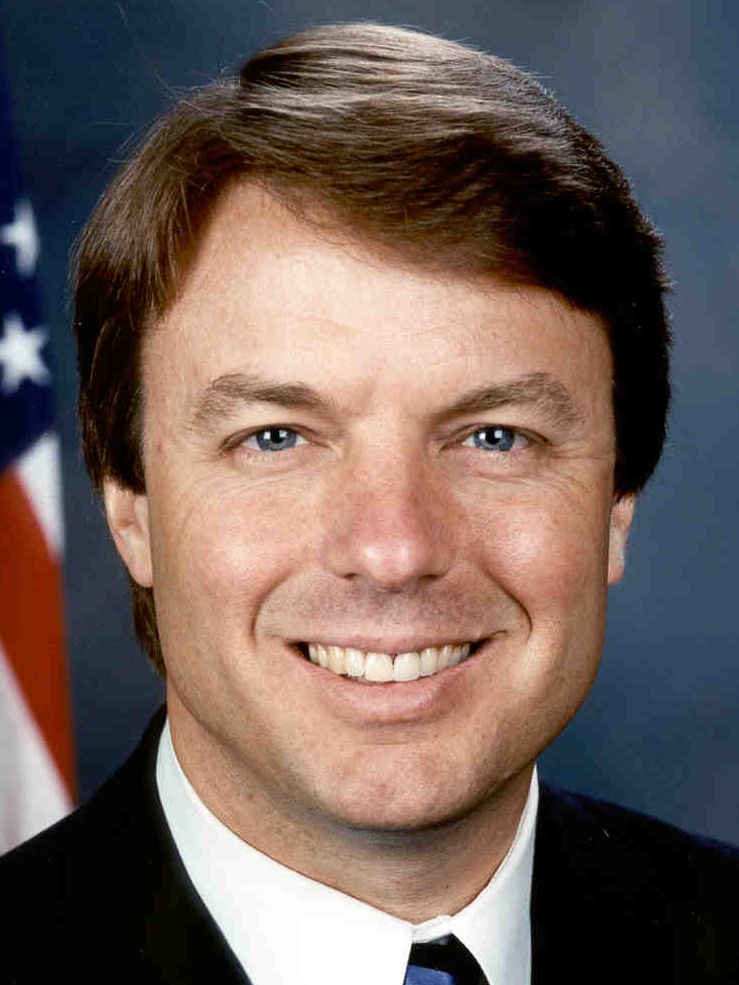
Candidate	John Kerry	Al Sharpton
Home state	Massachusetts	New York
Delegate count	9	4
Popular vote	4,278	1,824
Percentage	46.88%	19.99%
Candidate	Howard Dean	John Edwards
Home state	Vermont	North Carolina
Delegate count	3	0
Popular vote	1,596	927
Percentage	17.49%	10.16%

The District of Columbia caucuses were held on February 14, 2004. John Kerry won the caucuses.

=== Results ===
2004 District of Columbia Democratic presidential caucuses
Candidate	Popular vote		Pledged delegates
Candidate	Count	Percentage	Pledged delegates
John Kerry	4,278	46.88%	9
Al Sharpton	1,824	19.99%	4
Howard Dean	1,596	17.49%	3
John Edwards	927	10.16%	0
Dennis Kucinich	303	3.32%	0
Wesley Clark (withdrawn)	93	1.02%	0
Write-ins	55	0.60%	0
Joe Lieberman (withdrawn)	31	0.34%	0
Uncommitted	19	0.21%	0
Total	9,126	100%	16
