= 2024 New York Republican presidential primary =

- April 2, 2024

91 Republican National Convention delegates

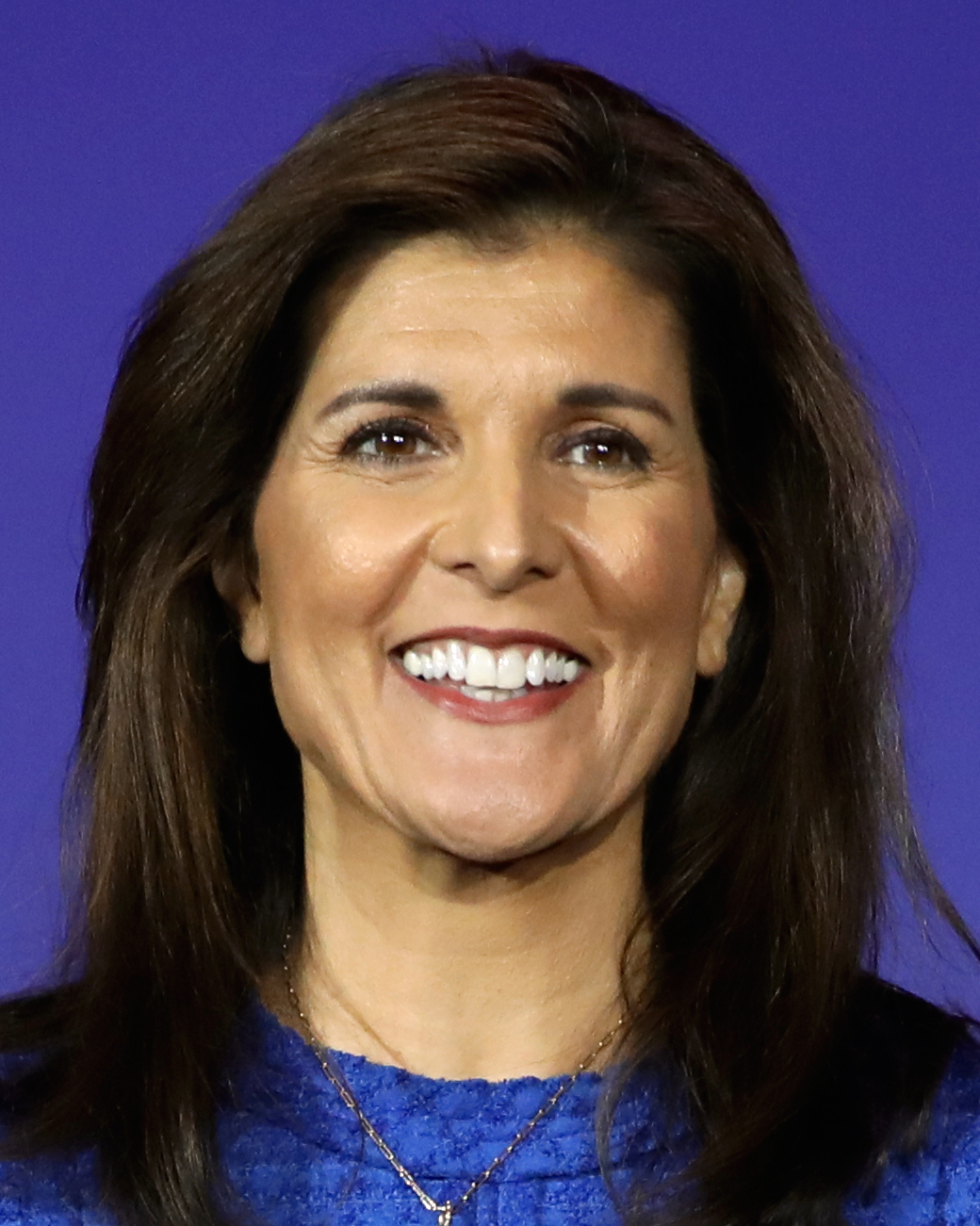
Candidate	Donald Trump	Nikki Haley (withdrawn)
Home state	Florida	South Carolina
Delegate count	91	0
Popular vote	132,698	21,145
Percentage	81.2%	12.9%

Trump
60–70%
70–80%
80–90%
>90%

The 2024 New York Republican presidential primary was held on April 2, 2024, as part of the Republican Party primaries for the 2024 presidential election. 91 delegates to the 2024 Republican National Convention were allocated on a winner-take-most basis. The contest was held alongside the primaries in Connecticut, Rhode Island, and Wisconsin.

== Endorsements ==
Ron DeSantis (withdrawn)

Former federal executive official

- Ed Rollins, White House Director of Political and Intergovernmental Affairs (1985); White House Director of Political Affairs (1982–1983)
Nikki Haley (withdrawn)

Notable individual

- Judy Sheindlin, host of Judge Judy, former prosecutor, author, television personality, former Manhattan family court judge, and civil court judge
Mike Pence (withdrawn)

Former U.S. Representative

- Peter King, NY-02 (2013–2021) and NY-03 (1993–2013)
Donald Trump

Former federal executive officials

- Sebastian Gorka, Deputy Assistant to the President (2017)
- Lynne Patton, Administrator of the U.S. Department of Housing and Urban Development for Region II (2017–2021)

U.S. Representatives

- Nick LaLota, NY-01 (2023–present)
- Nick Langworthy, NY-23 (2023–present)
- Nicole Malliotakis, NY-11 (2021–present)
- George Santos, NY-03 (2023)
- Elise Stefanik, NY-21 (2015–present); HRC chair (2021–present)
- Claudia Tenney, NY-24 (2023–present) and NY-22 (2021–2023, 2017–2019)
- Brandon Williams, NY-22 (2023–present)
- Lee Zeldin, NY-01 (2015–2023); Republican nominee in the 2022 New York gubernatorial election

Local officials

- Vito Fossella, Borough President of Staten Island (2022–present)
- Carl Paladino, Member of the Buffalo Public Schools Board of Education from the Park District (2013–2017)
- Leticia Remauro, chair of Staten Island Community Board 1 (2009–2015)

Notable individuals

- Eric Metaxas, radio host
- Norman Podhoretz, conservative political commentator

Organization

- New York Young Republican Club

== Results ==
Trump secured a comfortable victory, winning more than four fifths of the vote in the state. He won every county and congressional district in the state, performing best in the Staten Island and Staten Island-based 11th district. Both the county and the district were the only ones in New York City to back him over his Democratic opponent in both 2016 and 2020. He got his worst result in the 12th district. Trump showed his poorest performance in Tompkins County against Nikki Haley.

New York Republican primary, April 2, 2024
Candidate	Votes	Percentage	Actual delegate count		
Candidate	Votes	Percentage	Bound	Unbound	Total
Donald Trump	132,698	81.2%	91		91
Nikki Haley (withdrawn)	21,145	12.9%			
Chris Christie (withdrawn)	6,679	4.1%			
Vivek Ramaswamy (withdrawn)	1,667	1.0%			
Blank or void ballots	1,311	0.8%			
Total:	163,500	100.0%	91		91

== Polling ==
Poll source	Date(s) administered	Sample size (Note: Key: A – all adults RV – registered voters LV – likely voters V – unclear)	Margin of error	Chris Christie	Ron DeSantis	Nikki Haley	Asa Hutchinson	Mike Pence	Vivek Ramaswamy	Tim Scott	Donald Trump	Others	Undecided
Morning Consult	Nov 1–30, 2023	1,876 (LV)	–	4%	13%	8%	0%	–	5%	2%	66%	1% (Note: Doug Burgum with 1%)	1%
Morning Consult	Oct 1–31, 2023	2,014 (LV)	–	4%	12%	6%	0%	4%	7%	3%	64%	0% (Note: Doug Burgum and Will Hurd with 0%)	–
Morning Consult	Sep 1–30, 2023	1,924 (LV)	–	3%	14%	5%	1%	5%	8%	2%	62%	1% (Note: Doug Burgum with 1%; Will Hurd with 0%)	–
Siena College	Sep 10–13, 2023	804 (RV)	± 4.3%	–	–	–	–	–	–	–	64%	27%	8%
Morning Consult	Aug 1–31, 2023	2,006 (LV)	–	4%	14%	4%	0%	7%	10%	2%	57%	0% (Note: Doug Burgum, Will Hurd, and Francis Suarez with 0%)	2%
Siena College	Aug 13–16, 2023	803 (RV)	± 4.4%	–	–	–	–	–	–	–	63%	32%	5%
Morning Consult	July 1–31, 2023	1,886 (LV)	–	4%	18%	2%	0%	6%	8%	2%	58%	1% (Note: Will Hurd with 1%; Doug Burgum and Francis Suarez with 0%)	1%
Morning Consult	June 1–30, 2023	1,856(LV)	–	3%	17%	3%	1%	6%	4%	4%	60%	1% (Note: Liz Cheney with 1%; Doug Burgum, Will Hurd, and Kristi Noem with 0%)	1%
Siena College	Jun 20–25, 2023	817 (RV)	± 3.9%	–	–	–	–	–	–	–	61%	34%	5%
Morning Consult	May 1–31, 2023	1,932(LV)	–	–	17%	3%	1%	6%	4%	4%	63%	3% (Note: Liz Cheney with 2%; Kristi Noem with 1%; Greg Abbott and Glenn Youngkin with 0%)	–
Siena College	May 7–11, 2023	810 (RV)	± 4.1%	–	–	–	–	–	–	–	60%	32%	8%
Morning Consult	Apr 1–30, 2023	1,792(LV)	–	–	20%	3%	0%	6%	1%	3%	59%	7% (Note: Liz Cheney with 3%; Greg Abbott, Kristi Noem, Mike Pompeo, and Glenn Youngkin with 1%)	1%
Morning Consult	Mar 1–31, 2023	1,831(LV)	–	–	28%	4%	–	6%	0%	4%	51%	6% (Note: Liz Cheney with 3%; Greg Abbott, Kristi Noem, and Mike Pompeo with 1%; Glenn Youngkin with 0%)	1%
Siena College	Mar 19–22, 2023	802 (RV)	± 4.6%	–	27%	–	–	–	–	–	52%	18%	–
Morning Consult	Feb 1–28, 2023	1,410(LV)	–	–	28%	4%	–	8%	0%	2%	51%	6% (Note: Liz Cheney with 2%; Greg Abbott, Ted Cruz, Kristi Noem, and Mike Pompeo with 1%; Glenn Youngkin with 0%)	1%
Echelon Insights	Feb 21–23, 2023	600 (LV)	± 4.2%	–	45%	–	–	–	–	–	44%	–	13%
Morning Consult	Jan 1–31, 2023	1,871(LV)	–	–	34%	3%	–	9%	–	1%	46%	9% (Note: Liz Cheney with 3%; Ted Cruz and Kristi Noem with 2%; Mike Pompeo and Glenn Youngkin with 1%; Greg Abbott with 0%)	–
Morning Consult	Dec 1–31, 2022	1,074 (LV)	–	–	33%	3%	–	7%	–	3%	44%	9% (Note: Ted Cruz with 5%; Liz Cheney with 3%; Kristi Noem with 1%; Greg Abbott, Mike Pompeo and Glenn Youngkin with 0%)	1%

== See also ==
- 2024 Republican Party presidential primaries
- 2024 United States presidential election
- 2024 United States presidential election in New York
- 2024 United States elections
