= Political positions of the 2016 Republican Party presidential primary candidates =

The Republican candidates in the 2016 United States presidential election are not all the same in their opinions. The following chart shows the different positions they hold.

== Domestic policy ==
=== LGBT rights ===
	Jeb Bush (Suspended campaign)	Ben Carson	Chris Christie (Suspended campaign)	Ted Cruz	Mark Everson (Suspended campaign)	Jack Fellure (Suspended campaign)	Carly Fiorina (Suspended campaign)	Jim Gilmore (Suspended campaign)	Lindsey Graham (Suspended campaign)	Mike Huckabee (Suspended campaign)	Bobby Jindal (Suspended campaign)	John Kasich	Andy Martin (Suspended campaign)	Jimmy McMillan (Suspended campaign)	George Pataki (Suspended campaign)	Rand Paul (Suspended campaign)	Rick Perry (Suspended campaign)	Marco Rubio	Rick Santorum (Suspended campaign)	Donald Trump	Scott Walker (Suspended campaign)
Executive Order 13672	Unknown	Unknown	Unknown	No	Unknown	Unknown	Unknown	Unknown	Unknown	Unknown	Unknown	Unknown	Unknown	Unknown	Unknown	No	Unknown	No	Unknown	Unknown	Unknown
Federal statute prohibiting discrimination in public accommodations on the basis of sexual orientation	No	Unknown	Unknown	No	Unknown	Unknown	Unknown	Unknown	Unknown	Unknown	No	Unknown	Unknown	Unknown	Unknown	No	Unknown	Unknown	Unknown	Yes	Unknown
Federal statute prohibiting discrimination in public and private employment on the basis of gender identity	Unknown	Unknown	Unknown	No	Unknown	Unknown	No	Unknown	No	Unknown	Unknown	Unknown	Unknown	Unknown	Unknown	No	No	No	Unknown	Unknown	Yes
Federal statute prohibiting discrimination in public and private employment on the basis of sexual orientation	No	Unknown	Unknown	No	Unknown	Unknown	No	Unknown	No	No	No	Unknown	Unknown	Unknown	Unknown	No	No	No	No	Yes	Yes
Maintain Obergefell v. Hodges	Unknown	Yes	Yes	No	Unknown	Unknown	Unknown	Unknown	Yes	No	Unknown	Yes,	Unknown	Unknown	Unknown	Unknown	Unknown	Yes	Unknown	No	Unknown

== Foreign Policy ==
Jeb Bush (Suspended campaign)	Ben Carson	Chris Christie (Suspended campaign)	Ted Cruz	Mark Everson (Suspended campaign)	Jack Fellure (Suspended campaign)	Carly Fiorina (Suspended campaign)	Jim Gilmore (Suspended campaign)	Lindsey Graham (Suspended campaign)	Mike Huckabee (Suspended campaign)	Bobby Jindal (Suspended campaign)	John Kasich	Andy Martin (Suspended campaign)	Jimmy McMillan (Suspended campaign)	George Pataki (Suspended campaign)	Rand Paul (Suspended campaign)	Rick Perry (Suspended campaign)	Marco Rubio	Rick Santorum (Suspended campaign)	Donald Trump	Scott Walker (Suspended campaign)

== Political ideologies ==
Note that some of these terms are self-identifiers (in quotation marks): the views linked to may not adequately represent all of their policy stances.

	Jeb Bush (Suspended campaign)	Ben Carson	Chris Christie (Suspended campaign)	Ted Cruz	Mark Everson (Suspended campaign)	Jack Fellure (Suspended campaign)	Carly Fiorina (Suspended campaign)	Jim Gilmore (Suspended campaign)	Lindsey Graham (Suspended campaign)	Mike Huckabee (Suspended campaign)	Bobby Jindal (Suspended campaign)	John Kasich	Andy Martin (Suspended campaign)	Jimmy McMillan (Suspended campaign)	George Pataki (Suspended campaign)	Rand Paul (Suspended campaign)	Rick Perry (Suspended campaign)	Marco Rubio	Rick Santorum (Suspended campaign)	Donald Trump	Scott Walker (Suspended campaign)
"conservative"	"conservative"	"conservative"	"conservative"	Unknown	Unknown	"conservative"	"conservative"	"conservative"	"conservative"	"conservative"	"full-spectrum conservative"	"conservative"	"conservative"	Unknown	"limited government conservative"	"Reagan conservative"	"conservative"	"conservative"	"conservative"	"conservative"	"conservative"

== See also ==
- Republican Party presidential candidates, 2016
- Political positions of the Democratic Party presidential primary candidates, 2016
