= Independent Political Report =

American digital newspaper

- Format: Digital
- Owner(s): George Phillies
- Founder(s): Thomas L. Knapp
- Publisher: Outsider Media
- Editor-in-chief: Jordan Willow Evans
- Website: independentpoliticalreport.com

The Independent Political Report (sometimes referred to as IPR) is an American political digital newspaper focusing on independent politicians and third parties in the United States. The website was founded by libertarian activist Thomas L. Knapp in 2008, and is administered by the Outsider Media Foundation, a 501(c)(3) nonprofit organization focused on providing media coverage to third party politicians. It was described as a "starkly conservative-leaning website" in 2018 and was sued by the Las Vegas Review-Journal for copyright infringement during the 2010 election cycle.

== Editorial team and staff ==
=== Current editorial team ===
- George Phillies, writer and retired physics professor at Worcester Polytechnic Institute
- Jordan Willow Evans, former Republican Town Committee secretary in Charlton, Massachusetts
- Joseph G. Buchman, Utah perennial candidate and policy analyst

=== Former ===
- Dan "Red" Phillips, journalist
- Thomas L. Knapp, founder of the website and Boston Tea Party vice-presidential candidate
- Peter Gemma, former member of the Sarasota, Florida GOP executive committee and white nationalist
- Paulie Cannoli, co-founder of LPRadicals
