= Mark Burns (pastor) =

American evangelical minister (born 1979)

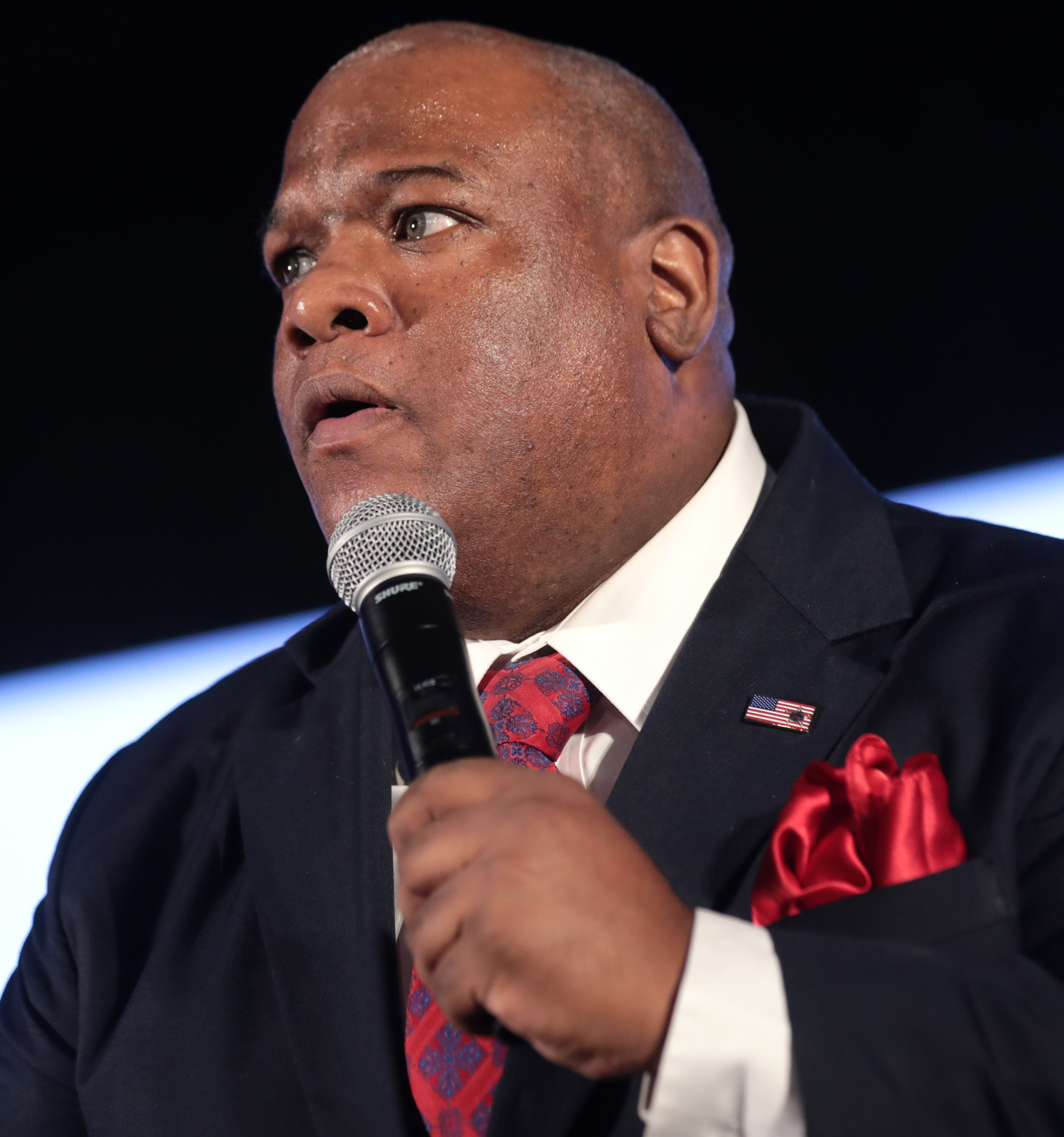
- Burns in 2019
- Born: John Mark Burns; September 21, 1979 (age 47); Anderson, South Carolina, U.S.
- Education: Southern Wesleyan University (attended); Tri-County Technical College (attended); North Greenville University (attended)
- Political party: Republican
- Children: 5
- Website: Official website

John Mark Burns (born September 21, 1979) is an American evangelical minister, televangelist and politician who is the pastor of the Harvest Praise & Worship Center in South Carolina. He was an early supporter of Donald Trump during the 2016 United States presidential election and by 2023 was a board member of Pastors for Trump.

Burns unsuccessfully ran for the United States House of Representatives in South Carolina's 4th congressional district in 2018 and 2022. He unsuccessfully ran to represent the 3rd congressional district in the 2024 election. He is co-founder of the NOW Television Network.

Burns has associated with AllatRa, variously described as a new religious movement and/or a cult, since at least 2025. Burns used his platform to amplify allegations of rape and child abuse against Czech Youtuber, anti-cult activist, and humanitarian aid worker Jakub Jahl; these allegations were found to be false by Czech police, and a Prague court ordered the removal of an online video containing such defamatory claims.

== Early life and education ==
Burns briefly attended Southern Wesleyan University, then transferred to Tri-County Technical College, and again to North Greenville University, which he attended for one semester before dropping out.

=== Education claims ===
Burns claimed to have held a Bachelor of Science degree from North Greenville University and claimed to have served six years in the U.S. Army Reserve. In August 2016, those claims were disproved by CNN. Burns attended North Greenville University for one semester and did not receive a degree. Burns served from 2001 to 2005 in the South Carolina Army National Guard, rather than the Army Reserve. Burns said the false claims about his life on his website were the result of the website being hacked. Later, he admitted that he had lied about his education, but said he was attacked because he is "a black man supporting Donald Trump for president."

== Career ==
=== Religious career ===
After working at a McDonald's, Burns founded a church in Easley, South Carolina, then moved into televangelism.

=== Donald Trump's 2016 presidential campaign ===
Burns was described by Time magazine as "Donald Trump's Top Pastor" and named one of the "16 People Who Shaped the 2016 Presidential Election" by Yahoo! News. Burns said he had usually voted Democratic, which included support for Barack Obama in the 2008 presidential election, saying, "I'm not ashamed to say that as a black man I wanted the first black man to enter the office." He later said, in 2016, he had "seen the light." Of Trump, he said, "He's a smart man. He knows authenticity. I believe he knows and recognizes real character."

At a Trump rally in North Carolina, Burns said that Democratic presidential candidate Bernie Sanders, who is Jewish, "gotta get saved." Burns later addressed his statement and said he had not intended to criticize Judaism and that his remarks "had nothing to do with [Sanders'] faith or religion or conversion to Christianity."

Burns offered the benediction on the first day of the 2016 Republican National Convention. Before the prayer, he addressed the convention, called Trump a "man of God," and called on Republicans not to attack each other, labeling Hillary Clinton and the Democratic Party the "enemy." Critics of the message, including the Interfaith Alliance, accused Burns of inserting God into partisan politics. Later, responding to the outrage, he said, "If I could go back and use different wording, I wouldn't have said 'enemy,' I would have said, 'political opponents.'"

In August 2016, Burns was criticized after retweeting a digitally manipulated image of Hillary Clinton in blackface. Burns later stated, "I prayed that those who [sic] I offended really receive ... a sincere apology," adding that he believes that the Democratic Party uses black people for votes.

=== 2018 U.S. House election ===
In February 2018, Burns announced his candidacy for South Carolina's 4th congressional district in the 2018 election. He ran for the seat held by Trey Gowdy, who was retiring from Congress, since 2011. Burns lost during the first round, receiving 2.48% of the vote.

=== 2022 U.S. House election ===
In 2022, Burns unsuccessfully challenged incumbent William Timmons in the Republican primary in South Carolina's 4th congressional district. Burns received 23.8% of the vote.

=== 2024 U.S. House election ===
In 2024, Burns filed to run in South Carolina's 3rd congressional district in the 2024 election and was endorsed by presidential candidate Donald Trump. In the primary, Burns came in first, receiving 33.2% of the vote. Failing to receive over 50% of the vote to win a primary in South Carolina, Burns advanced to a runoff with nurse practitioner Sheri Biggs, where she narrowly defeated him by 2% to become the Republican nominee on June 25.

== Views ==
In November 2020, during the 2020 presidential election, Burns made claims of voter fraud. He tweeted his concern towards "those who seek to undermine the sacred election process in our democracy" and shared that "President Trump is the clear winner of this 2020 Presidential election". After the January 6 United States Capitol attack, Burns was among those who advanced the idea that people associated with antifa were responsible for the attack.

In a 2022 interview with far-right internet personality Stew Peters, Burns called for the arrest of supportive parents of transgender children, comparing them and pro-LGBTQ teachers to the leaders of the Hitler Youth. He further called for their conviction for treason, reminding Peters that the penalty for treason is death.

He is a staunch supporter of Israel.

Despite having initially been "on record as being one of the staunch opponents of supporting Ukraine" during the Russo-Ukrainian War, following a personal visit to the country Burns admitted that he had been "brainwashed by fake news media about Ukraine" with regards to allegations of suppression of religious faith and atrocities being committed by Russia, declaring as a result his opinion of Vladimir Putin to be "Evil, pure evil". After visiting Ukraine, Burns supported US military aid to Ukraine.

== Personal life ==
Burns and his ex-wife, Tomarra Burns, have two children. Burns has three children from a separate previous marriage and was the step-father to Tomarra’s two children from previous relationships.
