= Robby Wells =

American politician and football coach (born 1968)

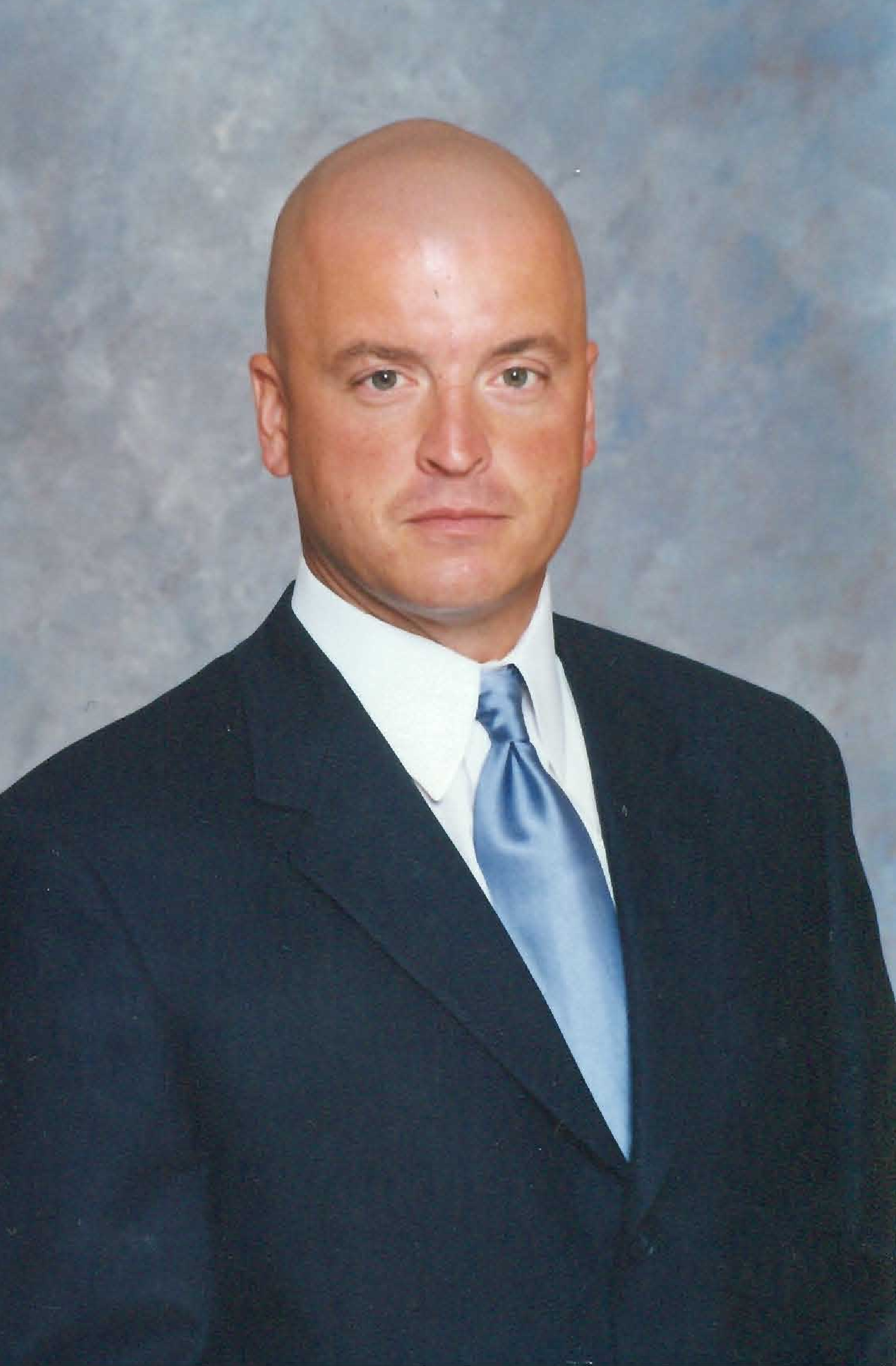

Personal details
- Born: April 10, 1968 (age 58) Bartow, Georgia, U.S.
- Party: Party (since c. 2022 – c. 2024)
- Other political affiliations: Reform (2011–2012); Constitution (2012); Democratic (2013–2016, 2018–c. 2020 – c. 2024); Independent (before 2011, 2013, 2016–2018)
- Coaching career

Playing career
- 1986–1989: Furman
- Position: Fullback

Coaching career (HC unless noted)
- 1990–1994: Greer HS (SC) (assistant)
- 1995–1997: C. E. Murray HS (SC)
- 1998–1999: South Carolina (DB)
- 2000–2001: South Carolina (LB)
- 2002–2005: South Carolina State (DC)
- 2007: Benedict (DC)
- 2008–2009: Savannah State

Head coaching record
- Overall: 7–15 (college)

Robert Andrew Crawford Wells (born April 10, 1968) is an American politician and former college football coach. He was the head football coach at Savannah State University in Savannah, Georgia for the 2008 and 2009 seasons.

Wells unsuccessfully sought the Constitution Party's nomination for President of the United States in the 2012 presidential election. He ran as an independent in the 2016 presidential election. He was a candidate in the 2020 Democratic Party presidential primaries, and the Party Party nominee in the 2024 presidential election.

In January 2024, Wells ran in Virginia's 6th congressional district as an independent.

== College football career ==
Wells played football at Furman University, playing fullback and wide receiver. He was a member of the 1988 NCAA Division I-AA national championship team.

== Coaching career ==
Wells coached football from 1990 to 2009. He began his career as an assistant coach at Greer High School in Greer, South Carolina from 1990 to 1994. He served as the head football coach at C. E. Murray High School in Greeleyville, South Carolina from 1995 to 1997.

Wells moved to the University of South Carolina as a graduate assistant for four seasons. He worked with the defensive backs (1998–1999) and middle linebackers (2000). Wells moved on to become the defensive coordinator at South Carolina State University in 2002. His Bulldogs defenses attained numerous national rankings and contributed to a Mid-Eastern Athletic Conference (MEAC) championship in 2004.

In 2006, Wells was hired as the general manager for the Augusta Spartans arena football team where his duties included coaching, player personnel decisions, player development, team travel, fund raising and media relations.

Wells' final position before joining Savannah State was as the defensive coordinator and football marketing director for one season at Benedict College in Columbia, South Carolina.

=== Savannah State ===
Wells was hired as head football coach on December 22, 2007. In his first season as head coach, the team saw as many victories as the previous four seasons combined. Wells resigned his position on January 28, 2010, citing personal reasons. He subsequently filed a lawsuit against SSU for reverse discrimination, alleging that his resignation as head coach was forced. The lawsuit was settled in November 2011.

== Head coaching record ==
=== College ===
| Year | Team | Overall | Conference | Standing | Bowl/playoffs |
|---|---|---|---|---|---|
Savannah State Tigers (NCAA Division I FCS independent) (2008–2009)
| 2008 | Savannah State | 5–7 | | | |
| 2009 | Savannah State | 2–8 | | | |
| Savannah State: | | 7–15 | | | |
| Total: | | 7–15 | | | |

== Political career ==
=== 2012 ===
See: Constitution Party National Convention

On November 21, 2011, Wells announced his candidacy for President of the United States in the 2012 general election. He initially stated that he would run as an independent, saying "Our party system is broken. We need a third option". In December, he became a candidate for the presidential nomination of the Reform Party. In January 2012, Wells withdrew his bid for the Reform Party nomination and announced that he would instead seek the presidential nomination of the Constitution Party. At the Constitution Party National Convention, Wells received 58 of 402 votes (14.39%) for the party's presidential nomination, which was won on the first ballot by former U.S. Congressman Virgil Goode.

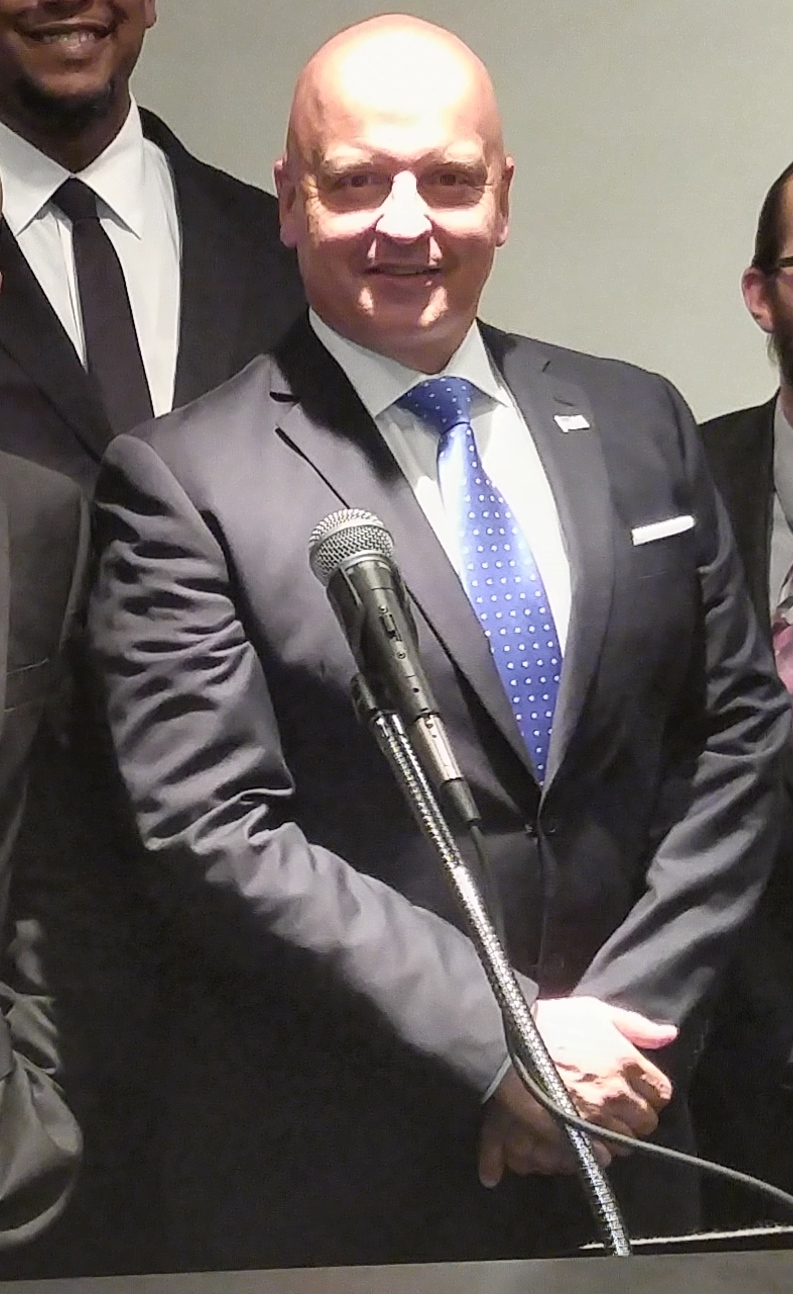
Wells at a debate between independent candidates

=== 2016 ===
Wells announced on November 3, 2012, that he would run for President of the United States again in 2016 as an independent candidate. On July 17, 2013, he held a conference call to address a variety of accusations by his former campaign managers.

On September 24, 2013, Wells announced that he would discontinue campaigning as an independent candidate and would instead seek the presidential nomination of the Democratic Party. On March 9, 2016, a press release on Wells' website claimed that Wells is no longer running as a Democrat, but as an independent once again.

=== 2020 ===
See 2020 Democratic Party presidential primaries

In 2018, Wells filed with the Federal Election Commission to run for President in the 2020 Democratic Party primary. He filed in person at the office of Secretary of State Bill Gardner to enter the New Hampshire Democratic primary on November 13, 2019. He then went on to get on the ballot in the Texas and Louisiana Democratic primaries. Starting in 2019, Wells has publicly associated himself with AllatRa, a new religious movement of Ukrainian origin.

=== 2024 ===
In February 2024, Wells announced he would run for the United States House of Representatives in Virginia's 6th district.

Wells was also available as a write-in presidential candidate in eight states along with vice-presidential running mate (and Party Party founder) Tony Jones.

The Wells/Jones Party Party ticket had ballot access in Rhode Island (4 electors) and appeared in the fourth slot on the 2024 Rhode Island presidential ballot.
