= Party Party of Rhode Island =

American centrist political party

- Leader: Tony Jones
- Founder: Tony Jones
- Founded: 18 November 2022
- Ideology: Centrism; Electoral reform
- Political position: Center
- Colors: Yellow

Website
- www.partyparty.vote

The Party Party of Rhode Island is a Rhode Island-based American political party founded in 2023 by broadcaster, entrepreneur, and theology professor Tony Jones.

== Campaigns ==
=== Presidential nominees ===
Year	Nominees		Performance					Ref
Year	President	Vice President	Votes	Percentage	±%	Electoral votes	Ballot access	Ref
2024	Robby Wells	Tony Jones	356	0.07%	+0.07%	0	RI	

==== 2024 elections ====
The Party submitted 1,000 signatures to the Rhode Island Secretary of State and was given the fourth spot on the Rhode Island presidential ballot. The party nominated Robby Wells for President of the United States and Tony Jones for Vice President of the United States. The party also nominated Jones as their presidential elector.

Jones also ran as a candidate in the primary for Narragansett Town Council on September 10th. He finished with 2.2% of the vote.

=== Best results in major races ===
Office	Percent	Result	State / District	Year	Nominee
President	0.07%	7th	Rhode Island	2024	Robby Wells/Tony Jones
City Council	2.2%	13th	Narragansett Town Council	2024	Tony Jones
