= 2024 Wisconsin Republican presidential primary =

- April 2, 2024

41 Republican National Convention delegates

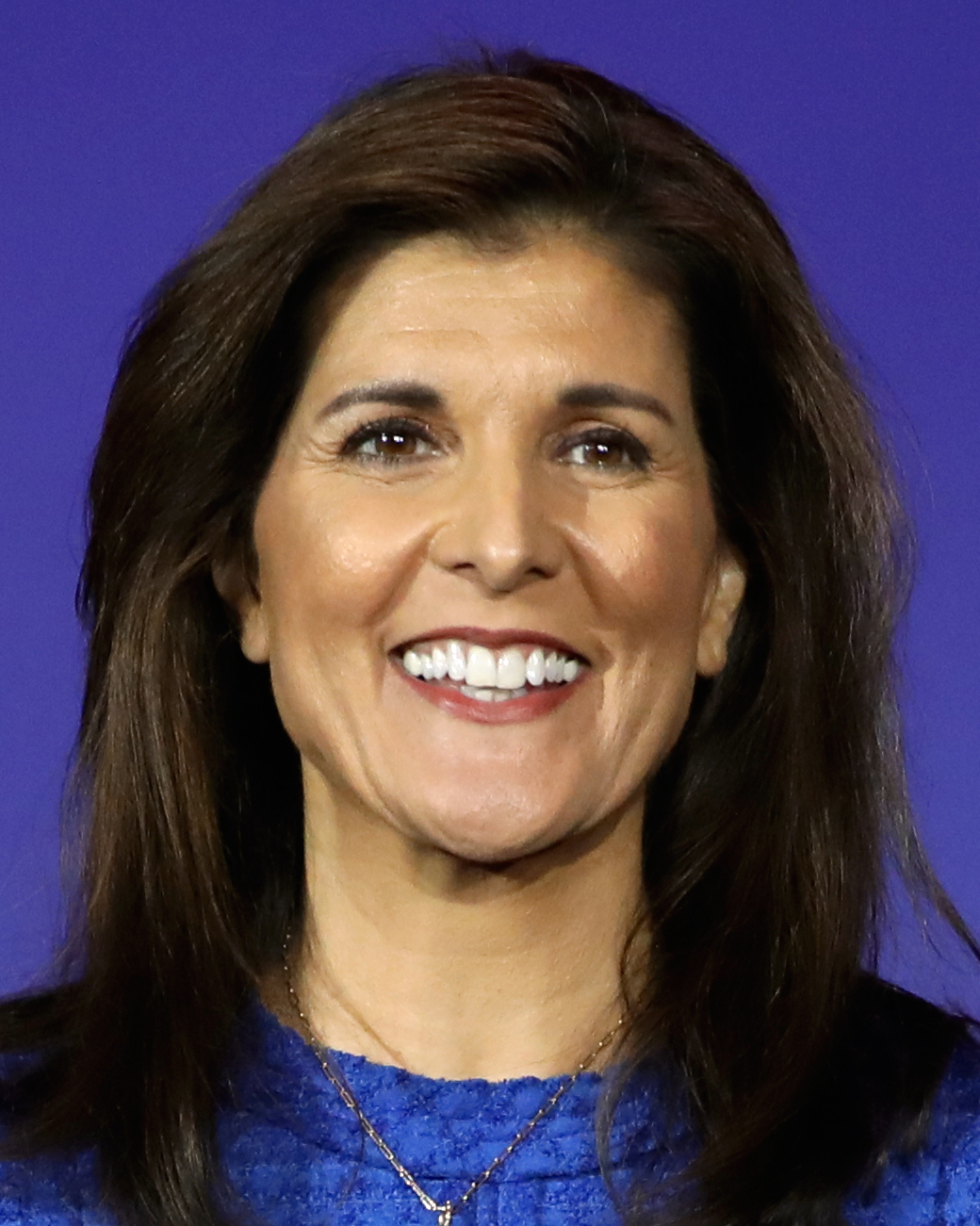
Candidate	Donald Trump	Nikki Haley (withdrawn)
Home state	Florida	South Carolina
Delegate count	41	0
Popular vote	477,103	76,841
Percentage	78.97%	12.72%

Trump
60–70%
70–80%
80–90%
>90%

The 2024 Wisconsin Republican presidential primary was held on April 2, 2024, as part of the Republican Party primaries for the 2024 presidential election. 41 delegates to the 2024 Republican National Convention were allocated on a winner-take-all basis.

== Campaign ==
=== Debate ===
The first Republican primary debate was held at the Fiserv Forum in Milwaukee, Wisconsin, on August 23, 2023. It was hosted by Fox News and Rumble, and was moderated Bret Baier and Martha MacCallum. The debate featured eight candidates: Doug Burgum, Chris Christie, Ron DeSantis, Nikki Haley, Asa Hutchinson, Mike Pence, Vivek Ramaswamy, and Tim Scott. The debate focused on issues relating to the crisis at the border with Mexico, the economy, abortion, and foreign policy.

== Candidates ==
- Donald Trump
- Chris Christie (withdrew January 10, 2024)
- Ron DeSantis (withdrew January 21, 2024)
- Nikki Haley (withdrew March 6, 2024)
- Vivek Ramaswamy (withdrew January 15, 2024)

Uninstructed Delegates was also an option on the primary ballot.

== Endorsements ==
Ron DeSantis (withdrawn)

State legislators

- John Gard, District 89 (1993–2007) and District 88 (1987–1993)
- Duey Stroebel, District 20 (2015–present)
Tim Scott (withdrawn)

U.S. Representatives

- Reid Ribble, WI-08 (2011–2017)
Nikki Haley (withdrawn)

U.S. Representative

- Paul Ryan, WI-01 (1999–2019); Speaker of the House (2015–2019); Republican nominee for Vice President in 2012

State legislators

- Devin LeMahieu, Majority Leader of the Wisconsin Senate (2021–present) from the 9th district (2015–present)
Donald Trump

U.S. Representatives

- Scott Fitzgerald, WI-05 (2021–present)
- Derrick Van Orden, WI-03 (2023–present)

Notable individual

- Tim Michels, Michels Corporation co-owner, nominee for Senate in 2004 and governor in 2022
Declined to endorse

U.S. senators

- Ron Johnson, (2011–present)

U.S. Representative

- Tom Tiffany, WI-07 (2020–present)

Statewide officials

- Scott Walker (2011–2019); candidate for president in 2016

Endorsements by incumbent Republicans in the Wisconsin Senate. Endorsed Ron DeSantis (1) (withdrawn) Endorsed Nikki Haley (1) (withdrawn) No endorsement (20)

== Results ==
Wisconsin Republican primary, April 2, 2024
Candidate	Votes	Percentage	Actual delegate count		
Candidate	Votes	Percentage	Bound	Unbound	Total
Donald Trump	477,103	78.97%	41	0	0
Nikki Haley (withdrawn)	76,841	12.72%	0	0	0
Ron DeSantis (withdrawn)	20,124	3.33%	0	0	0
Uninstructed	13,057	2.16%	0	0	0
Chris Christie (withdrawn)	9,771	1.62%	0	0	0
Vivek Ramaswamy (withdrawn)	5,200	0.86%	0	0	0
Write-ins	2,081	0.34%	0	0	0
Total:	604,177	100.00%	41	0	41

== Polling ==
Source of poll aggregation	Dates administered	Dates updated	Nikki Haley	Donald Trump	Other/ Undecided (Note: Calculated by taking the difference of 100% and all other candidates combined.)	Margin
270ToWin	February 7, 2024	February 15, 2024	22.5%	71.5%	6.0%	Trump +49.0
FiveThirtyEight	through February 4, 2024	February 15, 2024	21.1%	70.9%	8.0%	Trump +49.8

Poll source	Date(s) administered	Sample size (Note: Key: A – all adults RV – registered voters LV – likely voters V – unclear)	Margin of error	Doug Burgum	Chris Christie	Ron DeSantis	Nikki Haley	Asa Hutchinson	Mike Pence	Vivek Ramaswamy	Tim Scott	Donald Trump	Other	Undecided
Public Policy Polling (D)	Dec 11–12, 2023	503 (LV)	± 4.4%	–	5%	16%	15%	–	–	4%	–	54%	–	6%
Morning Consult	Nov 1–30, 2023	720 (LV)	–	1%	2%	17%	13%	1%	–	6%	2%	56%	–	2%
Marquette University Law School	October 26 – November 2, 2023	402 (RV)	± 6.8%	1%	1%	18%	11%	0%	6%	3%	1%	38%	0% (Note: Larry Elder with 0%)	24%
Morning Consult	Oct 1–31, 2023	713 (LV)	–	0%	3%	15%	12%	1%	4%	9%	3%	52%	–	1%
Morning Consult	Sep 1–30, 2023	665 (LV)	–	–	2%	16%	9%	1%	7%	11%	2%	50%	0% (Note: Will Hurd with 0%)	2%
Morning Consult	Aug 1–31, 2023	681 (LV)	–	–	3%	16%	6%	2%	8%	11%	5%	50%	0% (Note: Will Hurd with 0%)	–
Morning Consult	July 1–31, 2023	707 (LV)	–	0%	2%	25%	5%	1%	8%	8%	4%	46%	1% (Note: Will Hurd with 1%; Francis Suarez with 0%)	–
Morning Consult	June 1–30, 2023	666 (LV)	–	–	2%	24%	3%	0%	7%	6%	7%	51%	1% (Note: Liz Cheney with 1%; Greg Abbott with 0%)	–
Marquette Law School	June 8–13, 2023	419 (RV)	± 6.5%	0%	1%	30%	3%	0%	6%	3%	5%	31%	0% (Note: Larry Elder with <0.5%)	21%
Public Policy Polling	June 5–6, 2023	507 (LV)	± 4.4%	–	–	25%	5%	–	8%	2%	5%	41%	–	14%
Public Policy Polling	June 5–6, 2023	507 (LV)	± 4.4%	–	–	39%	–	–	–	–	–	43%	–	18%
Morning Consult	May 1–31, 2023	728 (LV)	–	–	–	24%	4%	0%	8%	5%	3%	52%	4% (Note: Liz Cheney with 3%; Kristi Noem with 1%; Glenn Youngkin with 0%)	–
Morning Consult	Apr 1–30, 2023	771 (LV)	–	–	–	31%	4%	0%	9%	2%	2%	45%	5% (Note: Liz Cheney with 4%; Mike Pompeo with 1%; Greg Abbott, Kristi Noem, and Glenn Youngkin with 0%)	2%
Morning Consult	Mar 1–31, 2023	722 (LV)	–	–	–	35%	6%	–	9%	1%	2%	43%	4% (Note: Liz Cheney with 2%; Mike Pompeo and Greg Abbott with 1%; Kristi Noem and Glenn Youngkin with 0%)	–
Morning Consult	Feb 1–28, 2023	626 (LV)	–	–	–	34%	4%	–	9%	0%	1%	44%	7% (Note: Liz Cheney with 4%; Ted Cruz, Mike Pompeo, and Greg Abbott with 1%; Kristi Noem and Glenn Youngkin with 0%)	1%
Morning Consult	Jan 1–31, 2023	897 (LV)	–	–	–	32%	2%	–	11%	–	2%	42%	10% (Note: Ted Cruz and Liz Cheney with 4%; Mike Pompeo and Greg Abbott with 1%; Kristi Noem and Glenn Youngkin with 0%)	1%
Morning Consult	Dec 1–31, 2022	558 (LV)	–	–	–	36%	4%	–	9%	–	1%	40%	8% (Note: Ted Cruz with 4%; Liz Cheney with 3%; Kristi Noem with 1%; Mike Pompeo and Greg Abbott with 0%)	2%

== See also ==
- 2024 Republican Party presidential primaries
- 2024 United States presidential election
- 2024 United States presidential election in Wisconsin
- 2024 United States elections
