= Mark Everson =

American politician (born 1954)

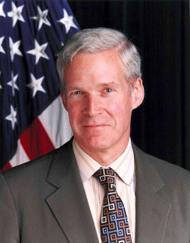

Commissioner of the Indiana Department of Workforce Development
- In office May 2010 – May 2012
- Governor: Mitch Daniels
- Preceded by: Teresa Voors
- Succeeded by: Scott Sanders

Commissioner of the Indiana Department of Administration
- In office January 2009 – May 2010
- Governor: Mitch Daniels
- Preceded by: Carrie Henderson
- Succeeded by: Robert Wynkoop

President and Chief Executive Officer of the American Red Cross
- In office May 29, 2007 – November 27, 2007
- Preceded by: Jack McGuire (acting)
- Succeeded by: Mary Elcano (acting)

46th Commissioner of Internal Revenue
- In office May 1, 2003 – May 4, 2007
- President: George W. Bush
- Preceded by: Charles Rossotti
- Succeeded by: Douglas Shulman

Deputy Director of the Office of Management and Budget for Management
- In office August 1, 2002 – May 1, 2003
- President: George W. Bush
- Preceded by: Sally Katzen
- Succeeded by: Clay Johnson

Personal details
- Born: Mark Whitty Everson; September 10, 1954 (age 71) New York City, New York, U.S.
- Party: Republican
- Spouse: Nanette Rutka (1984–2008)
- Children: 4
- Education: Yale University (BA); New York University (MBA)

Mark Whitty Everson (born September 10, 1954) is an American politician who is currently the Vice Chairman of alliantgroup and served as the 46th Commissioner of Internal Revenue from 2003 until 2007. Prior to his appointment as Commissioner of the IRS, Everson held a number of federal government positions in the administrations of George W. Bush and Ronald Reagan, as well as at the state level within the administration of Indiana Governor Mitch Daniels.

In August 2009, Everson joined alliantgroup, LP, a national tax advisory consultant, to advise the firm and its clients on matters related to the IRS and on strategic, operational, and client service initiatives. Everson was a candidate for the Republican presidential nomination in 2016, until he withdrew his candidacy on November 5, 2015.

== Education ==
Everson received his Bachelor of Arts degree in history from Yale University and Master of Science degree in accounting from New York University's Stern School of Business.

== Public service and business experience ==
Everson served in the Reagan administration from 1982 until 1988 holding several positions at the United States Information Agency and the Department of Justice, where he was deputy commissioner of the Immigration and Naturalization Service. While at INS, he oversaw implementation of the Immigration Reform and Control Act of 1986, landmark legislation providing for sanctions against employers hiring undocumented immigrants and granting amnesty to qualifying undocumented immigrants.

Prior to joining the Bush administration in August 2001, he was group vice president of finance at SC International Services, Inc., at the time a $2 billion privately owned, Dallas-based, food services company with leading market positions in both airline catering and home meals. From 1988 until 1998, he was an executive with the Pechiney Group, one of France's largest industrial groups. While with Pechiney, he held various financial and operating positions in the United States, France and Turkey.

From August 1, 2002, until his IRS confirmation, Everson served as deputy director for management for the Office of Management and Budget (OMB). He chaired the President's Management Council, which is composed of cabinet department and major agency chief operating officers. The council is charged with improving overall executive branch management, including implementation of the President's Management Agenda. Before becoming deputy director for management, he served as controller of the Office of Federal Financial Management, also a part of OMB.

Everson was appointed by President George W. Bush to a five-year term as Commissioner of Internal Revenue, the head of the Internal Revenue Service (IRS), and was confirmed by the U.S. Senate on May 1, 2003, as its 46th commissioner. Areas of focus during his tenure with the IRS included combating abusive tax shelters and the development of more productive enforcement relationships with counterpart tax authorities in other countries. Everson left the IRS effective May 4, 2007, before the end of his term to join the American Red Cross as its new CEO.

Later, Everson was a cabinet member for Indiana Governor Mitch Daniels from January 2009 to May 2012, where he served initially as Department of Administration Commissioner. From 2010 to 2012, Everson served as the Commissioner of the Department of Workforce Development, where he oversaw the state's unemployment system and federal training programs. In this role, Everson began a program that was endorsed by the Indiana Chamber of Commerce and the Indiana Manufacturers Association that helped qualifying ex-offenders realize employment opportunities.

=== American Red Cross ===
On April 18, 2007, the Board of Governors of the American Red Cross unanimously approved Everson as president and chief executive officer of the American Red Cross, effective May 29, 2007.

On November 27, 2007, the Board of Governors, after learning that Everson engaged in a personal relationship with a subordinate employee, asked for and received Everson's resignation.

== 2016 presidential campaign ==
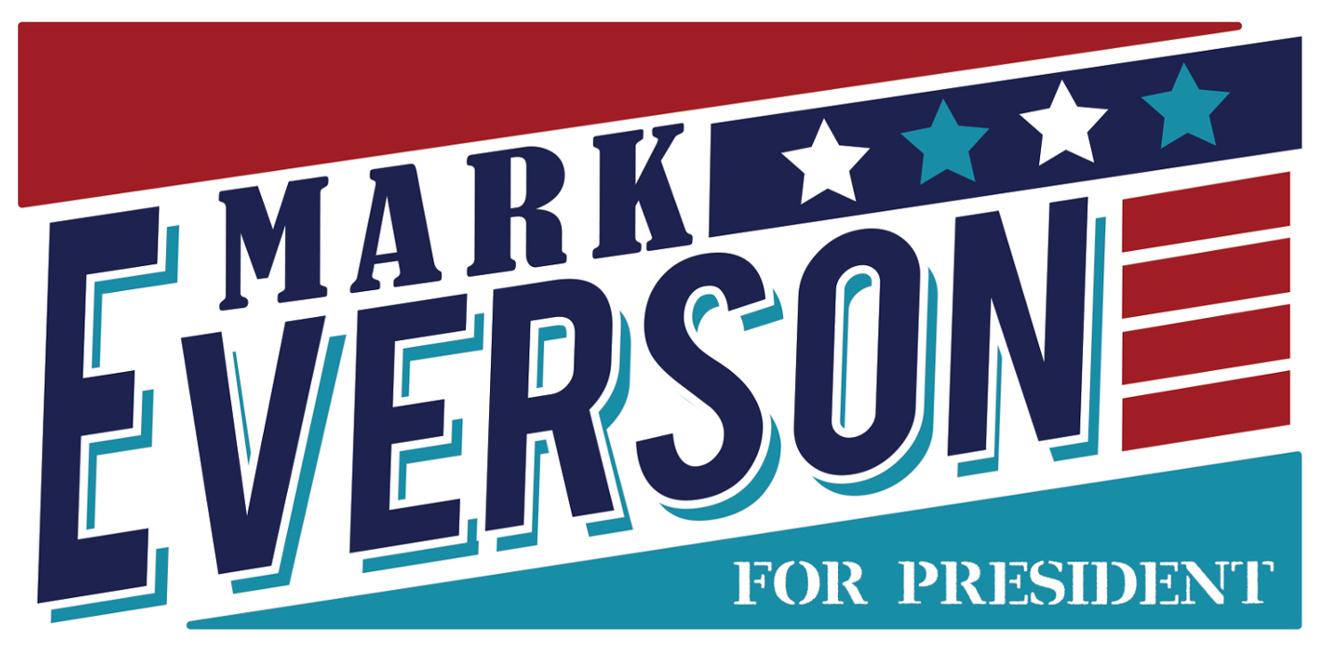
Mark Everson's campaign logo

On March 5, 2015, Everson announced his intention to seek the Republican Party's nomination for President of the United States in the 2016 Presidential election. He launched his bid with a video and 16-page open letter, in which he laid out six primary issues:

1. Fundamental tax reform.
2. Confronting the lawlessness of the Big Banks.
3. Re-establishing the draft in order to have a shared sense of national service.
4. Real, balanced reforms to America's entitlement programs.
5. Reinforcing the American tradition of assimilation through comprehensive immigration reform.
6. Serving only a single term to keep re-election politics out of Presidential decision-making.

On September 11, 2015, the Des Moines Register published an op-ed entitled "Iowans should learn Everson's name, ideas", praising him as a candidate "insider enough to understand the messy business of political compromise, and outsider enough, in his words, not to 'owe any backers.'"

Everson was the first declared candidate to open an office in Iowa, and logged more visits to the state than seven major candidates. He was one of the 18 candidates listed on the Republican National Committee's straw poll, and he outperformed some of the GOP's front-runners in non-scientific straw polls. However, he was not listed in the Iowa Poll sponsored by Register and Bloomberg Politics and was not invited to the televised debates.

After being informed that he would not be allowed to participate in a scheduled Fox News debate in Cleveland on August 6, 2015, Everson filed a formal complaint with the Federal Election Commission, arguing that Fox News had violated election laws by failing to adhere to consistent criteria in determining which candidates would make the debate stage. Fox News originally stated that candidates must be polling at 1 percent in an average of five national polls to participate, but did away with the standard a week before the scheduled debate. On August 7, 2015, the Cleveland Plain Dealer ran an op-ed arguing that Everson should have been included in the 5 p.m. debate.

While on the campaign trail, Everson was one of the earliest critics of eventual Republican presidential nominee Donald Trump. After Trump's presidential announcement, Everson called for Trump to drop out of the race; he asserted that comments made by Trump about Mexican immigrants "'divide at a time when we need to unite and reinforce our proud tradition of assimilation'".

Everson put almost $400,000 of his own money into the campaign and raised approximately $100,000. On November 5, 2015, Everson withdrew from the race, citing lack of funds, non-inclusion in debates, and scarce media attention as factors in his decision.

In June 2016, before the Republican convention, Everson stated that he could neither "get on board" with Trump nor "look the other way." He condemned the candidate's policy proposals as "reckless, be they stripping trillions in revenues from the Treasury ... or countenancing nuclear proliferation to name two of the worst." Everson wrote that "the deplorable demeanor he has deliberately cultivated over decades" disqualifies Trump from public service and that "his campaign is more than divisive; particularly for our young it is destructive and even frightening."

== Footnotes ==
=== References ===
This article incorporates information from the United States Internal Revenue Service. As a work of the U.S. federal government, it is in the public domain.
