= David Mills (author) =

American author (born 1959)

- Born: January 24, 1959 (age 67)
- Occupation: Author and politician

David Mills (born January 24, 1959) is an American author. Mills has argued that science and religion cannot be successfully reconciled. He is best known for his book Atheist Universe which was published in 2004. In his book The God Delusion, evolutionary biologist Richard Dawkins cites Mills' writings as "admirable work." Mills claims in his books to rebut both young- and old-earth creation science, as well as Intelligent Design.

Mills has been interviewed on multiple talk shows including The Infidel Guy, WBAI in New York, on Air America Radio, and elsewhere. He is also a self-proclaimed member of the Rational Response Squad.

He lives in Huntington, West Virginia, and ran for the 2016 Democratic presidential nomination.

In January 2026, Mills publicly revealed he was diagnosed with Stage IV prostate cancer that metastasized into his spinal cord.

== Published works ==
- Mills, David (2008). Atheist universe : the thinking person's answer to Christian fundamentalism. Berkeley, CA: Ulysses Press. ISBN 978-1569755679.
- Dr. Albert Ellis (Primary Contributor), David Mills (Artist) (June 26, 2009). Overcoming Self-Esteem: Why Your Pursuit of Self-Esteem Does More Harm than Good (CD audiobook). David Mills. ASIN B002EVPZ6W.
