= Jordan Willow Evans =

American politician

Jordan Evans
- Occupation: Politician
- Years active: 2016-2022
- Known for: Being the first and only openly transgender woman Republican Party elected official.
- Political party: Republican

Jordan Willow Evans is an American politician who was the only openly transgender Republican Party elected official in the United States.

Evans said she first tried coming out as trans in 2013. "I ended up going back into the closet," she told Cosmopolitan. Eventually, she began transitioning to female in 2015–2016.

As of 2016, she was Republican Town Committee secretary in Charlton, Massachusetts and elected trustee of the local library. She was elected Town Constable of Charlton in November 2017. She was elected again to the Dudley-Charlton Regional School Committee in 2020. She was included in an unsuccessful recall of her regional school committee by a local group known as Dudley Charlton United led by Carroll Sue Rehm of Florida concerned about sex education curriculum, critical race theory, and mask mandates in the district.

Evans left the Log Cabin Republicans in August 2019 after criticizing them in an op-ed in The Advocate for endorsing President Donald Trump's re-election. However, she remained associated with the Republican Party. In 2020, she ran unsuccessfully for Massachusetts Republican State Committee Woman. Her gender identity drew questions from local conservative press over whether she would be seated by the Massachusetts Republican Party if she won.

== See also ==
- List of transgender public officeholders in the United States
