= Project Russia =

Russian nonfiction book series

Project Russia is a Russian nonfiction book series written during the first decade of the 21st century. The books have placed highly on bestseller lists in Russia, including the political booklist in the Moskva bookshop and the nonfiction list of probooks.ru, which combines sales information from the eight largest retailers and networks. These books discuss aspects of political, economic and ideological life in Russia and the world, and try to predict the future.

As of 2011, four books have been published by EKSMO:

1. Project Russia (2005)
2. Project Russia, The Choice of the Way (2007)
3. Project Russia, The Third Millennium (2009)
4. Project Russia, The Great Idea (2010)

Project Russia touched on social questions, saying that Russia faced collapse and needed a unifying idea. State structural problems in Russia were also analyzed, exploring the possibility that the Russian Federation might cease to exist. The authors of Project Russia predicted the 2008 financial crisis in their 2005 book, describing the approaching unrest and analyzing its causes and the fall of the world order.

== History ==
The first volume was published anonymously in 2005. It was delivered by the DHS delivery service (a federal mail service of the Russian government) to most governmental departments of the Russian Federation (the Federal Security Service, the Presidential Administration of Russia, the Attorney General's office, the Duma and the Ministry of Foreign Affairs) and public figures, including film director Nikita Mikhalkov. As a result, the book was discussed in Russian political circles. In 2006, Project Russia was published by OLMA Press and Eksmo.

The second, third and fourth volumes were published by Eksmo, and the first edition of the third volume had a press run of one million copies. When The Third Millennium was published, advertisements in Kyiv had Ukraine as part of Russia. Three days later, the advertisements were ordered to be removed by the Security Service of Ukraine.

Mikhalkov said about Project Russia: "This book is very serious, very serious. Moreover, this is its anonymity that reveals the seriousness and unwillingness to appear personally and desire to express opinion about what occurs, occurred and will occur. I think that this book was written by very serious, religious and educated people". Alexander Khinshtein, a State Duma representative and journalist, said: "I completely agree with the words given in the book about the dominance of the people of limited thinking in power. I don't mind against monarchy, by the way we are living in the conditions not far from it". Project Russia books were seen in the office of First Deputy Chief of the Russian Presidential Administration Vladislav Surkov.

== Authors ==
Since the Project Russia author was anonymous and the first three volumes were not copyrighted, speculation began about the books' author. According to LDPR founder and leader Vladimir Zhirinovsky, the Kremlin produced Project Russia to create a unitary state. Although Internet reports indicated that the author is Russian ambassador to NATO Dmitry Rogozin, in an interview for the newspaper New Region Rogozin himself neither confirmed nor denied the possibility.

According to Alexander Goldfarb, a Russian activist close to oligarch Boris Berezovsky, all that is known for certain is that the project was ordered by the Kremlin. Goldfarb wrote that the CIA had two versions: Putin and his group conceived the project, or Project Russia was produced by high-level officials other than Putin. Possible Freemasonry authorship was mentioned, with similarities noted between Project Russia and the rules of masonic organizations. Sources in the Moscow Patriarchy called it a new sect: "Some structure, maybe even having thought out the technology of realization of its plan, spread nets for appealing people to another post-, or super-, or overreligious sect". Nothing was known about Project Russia's sponsorship, although Russian Railways president Vladimir Yakunin was rumored to be involved. Yakunin is considered a member of Putin's inner circle.

When the fourth volume was published in fall 2010, Project Russia's author appeared. Several months earlier, a scanned contract on LiveJournal confirmed that the author was Yuriy Shalyganov.
Project Russia, The Great Idea was copyrighted by Shalyganov, who gave several interviews. Shalyganov is not well known. According to the newspaper Komsomolskaya Pravda, he was born in Moscow in 1967 and may have worked for the KGB. Shalyganov has connections to Russian political, economic and church elites of Russia and foreign scientists and businesspeople. The recipient of several church and government awards, with a fortune estimated at more than $1 billion, he is married with one son. In interviews, Shalyganov does not talk about himself but only about the content of his books.

Shalyganov is a member of the council of experts of the Institute of Strategic Security. Little is known about the institute, except that it deals with problems similar to those analyzed in Project Russia.
