= Morning Consult =

US business intelligence and analytics company

- Type: Private
- Industry: Business intelligence
- Founded: 2014; 12 years ago
- Founder: Michael Ramlet (CEO); Kyle Dropp (president); Alex Dulin (Chief Technology Officer)
- Number of employees: 500+
- Website: morningconsult.com

Morning Consult is an American business intelligence company established in 2014. It was valued at more than one billion dollars in June 2021. The company specializes in online survey research technology and has offices in Washington, D.C., New York City, Chicago, and San Francisco. Morning Consult provides global survey research tools, data services and news to organizations in business, marketing, economics, and politics.

== History ==
Morning Consult started with a poll looking at whether young and uninsured Americans were going to sign up for the Affordable Care Act's insurance exchanges, published just before the exchanges went live in 2013.

In 2015, the company published a report on the "Shy Trump" voter in the Republican presidential primaries. The claim has since been challenged.

In June 2016 began polling with Bloomberg News on investor sentiment.

During the 2016 U.S. presidential election, Morning Consult and the political journalism company Politico published a weekly polling partnership on "political issues, personalities and media aspects that affect the daily debate". The polling relationship continued after the 2016 election and is released weekly in Politico Playbook.

The company's polling results for the 2016 U.S. presidential election showed a closer race than other pollsters.

Morning Consult conducts regular survey research with The New York Times.

In May 2020, Morning Consult completed a $31 million Series A funding round. The funding includes capital from James Murdoch's Lupa Systems, Advance Venture Partners and others. The funding values the company at $306 million.

In June 2021, Morning Consult raised a $60 million Series B funding round led by Advance Venture Partners with additional investors Susquehanna Growth Equity and Lupa Systems. Following this round of funding, the company is valued at over $1.01 billion.

== Polling and methodology ==
Morning Consult conducts scientific online polling. During the 2016 presidential election, Morning Consult predicted Hillary Clinton would win the national popular vote by 3 percent (her popular vote margin was 2.1 percent). In the 2018 and 2022 US midterm elections, Morning Consult performed well below average, with larger errors than most other pollsters.

== Survey on approval ratings ==
The company conducts surveys on the approval ratings of the leaders of major economies.

In October 2017, data from Brand Intelligence was cited in the New York Times showing changes in survey results on the NFL's brand after President Donald Trump criticized the league on Twitter.

== Economic Intelligence ==
Morning Consult launched its Economic Intelligence product in the fall of 2019, and in the spring of 2020 as it began to identify the dip in consumer confidence with the continued coronavirus outbreak. The Federal Reserve cited the company's data in its emergency meeting March 15, 2020.

The data is regularly referenced in the media, with past citations including The Associated Press, The New York Times, The Wall Street Journal, and The Washington Post.
