= Kansas Senate Bill 175 =

Proposed Kansas law

Senate Bill 175 is a 2016 Kansas legislative proposal that would prohibit public universities to "deny a religious student association any benefit available to any other student association" based on those organizations' "sincerely held religious beliefs" This bill is intended to protect student organizations who restrict membership in regards to LGBT students, which critics argue is discriminatory.

== Legislative history ==
On March 19, 2015, Kansas Senate passed, with a 30 yeas, 8 nays, and 2 absent or not voting, Senate Bill 175. On March 16, 2016, the Kansas House of Representatives passed, with 81 yeas, 41 days, and 3 absent or not voting, SB 175. On March 22, 2016, Governor Sam Brownback signed the bill and it went into effect on July 1, 2016.

== Reaction ==
On March 16, 2016, Human Rights Campaign blasted the Kansas House of Representatives for passing SB 175. On January 1, 2017, California barred state-funded travel to Kansas for enacting statutes that critics charge discriminate against members of the LGBT community.

== See also ==
- LGBT rights in Kansas
