= Harry Braun =

American politician (born 1948)

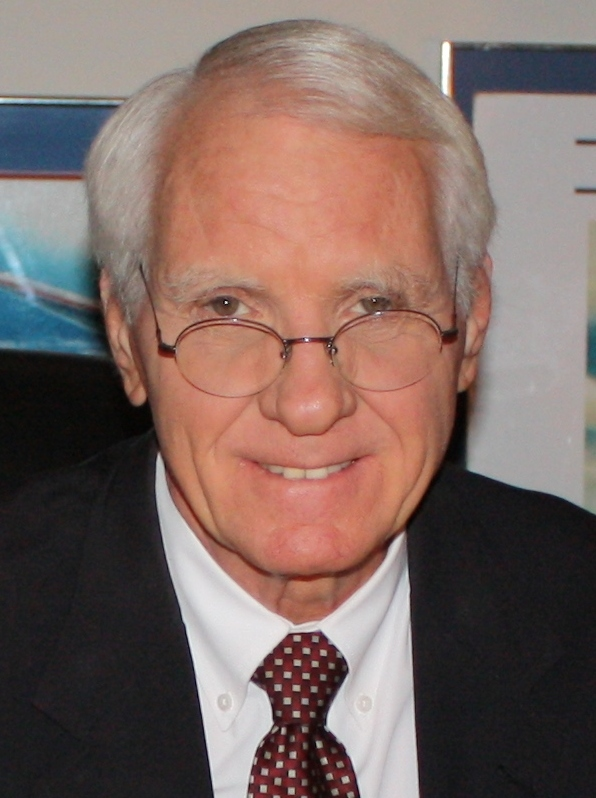
- Braun in 2012

Personal details
- Born: Harry William Braun III
- Party: Democratic
- Other political affiliations: Independent (2004)
- Spouse: Dorothy L. Braun
- Education: Arizona State University (BS)

Harry William Braun III is an American renewable energy consultant, researcher, and perennial candidate. He was a congressional nominee in 1984 and 1986, and has been a presidential candidate in 2004, 2012, 2016, and 2020. He has published papers on the hydrogen economy, solar power, and photobiology.

== Life and work ==
Braun is a graduate of Arizona State University Since 1998, Braun has been the principal of Mesa Wind LLC, which developed wind energy (and solar energy) projects.

Braun received a bachelor's degree in history and general science from Arizona State University in 1971. Since then, he has done independent research in the fields of energy technologies and resources, photobiology, molecular biology, and protein evolution. Braun is an Advisory Board Member of the International Association for Hydrogen Energy.

Braun is the founder and senior scientist of the Phoenix Project Foundation (PPF), a non-profit 501(c)(3) organization, which advocates for a hydrogen-based energy economy rather than the current fossil-fuel-based economy. The foundation promotes ideas outlined in Braun's book, Phoenix Project, initially published in 1990 and revised in 2000.

Braun's published papers and books include material on solar power, (Note: 1992, Solar Stirling Gensets for Large-Scale Hydrogen Production.) (Note: 1997, Stirling Energy Systems (SES): dish-Stirling program. (See also: Stirling Energy Systems.)) (Note: 1999, Status of the Boeing Dish Engine Critical Component project, 1999.) the hydrogen economy, (Note: 2003, Calculating hydrogen production costs.) and photobiology; (Note: 2008, Photobiology: The biological impact of sunlight on health & infection control. (See also, 1982.)) he has also published several versions of his book about using renewable energy to generate hydrogen, entitled The Phoenix Project. (Note: 2008, The Phoenix Project: Shifting to a Solar Hydrogen Economy by 2020. (Revised version; earlier versions published in 1990), 2000, and 2003.))

== Political campaigns ==
Braun has not been elected to office, but was the nominee of the Democratic party for two congressional races in the 1980s.

=== Congressional campaigns ===
In 1984, Braun was the Democratic nominee for Congress in the 1st congressional district of Arizona, losing to incumbent Republican congressman John McCain. According to The Arizona Republic, "A key element of Braun's energy platform is what he calls the 'Phoenix Project,' a plan to mass produce hydrogen with electrolysis by using solar power to produce the electricity." Major political problems of the 1980s that the plan could conceivably address included nuclear weapons, pollution, energy scarcity, and deficit spending. Braun received 22% of the vote.

In 1986, Braun ran again, and was again the Democratic nominee for Arizona's 1st congressional district, losing to Republican nominee Jay Rhodes. Energy policy in general, and solar power plus the hydrogen economy in particular, was again a key platform-plank of Braun's campaign. Braun also campaigned on a broader set of issues during October 1986, including irrigation and water-use policy. Braun improved on his 1984 performance, and received 29% of the vote.

=== Presidential campaigns ===
==== 2004 ====
In 2004, Braun ran an independent campaign for President, with the campaign-slogan of "Making America Energy Independent & Pollution Free with Windship Hydrogen Production Systems." Braun's energy policy was distinct from the hydrogen economy proposed by George W. Bush, in that Braun wanted to generate hydrogen from seawater via electrolysis (using renewable energy), as opposed to generating hydrogen from coal and nuclear power plants. Braun participated in a Presidential Candidates Forum in 2004 in New Hampshire that was covered by C-SPAN.

==== 2012 ====
Braun did not run in 2008, but did run again in 2012, against incumbent Democratic President Barack Obama. Braun's 2012 campaign included stops in Iowa.

==== 2016 ====
Braun ran for the Democratic nomination again in 2016.

==== 2020 ====
Braun announced his candidacy for the Democratic nomination again in 2020.

=== Proposed constitutional amendment ===
Braun has proposed an amendment to the United States Constitution which he calls the Democracy Amendment. It reads "We the People, hereby empower the majority of American citizens to approve all laws, federal legislation, presidential executive orders, and judicial decisions that impact the majority of citizens." His plan is for the amendment to be ratified directly by voters through constitutional conventions. He has made this amendment a focus of past presidential campaigns.
