= Political positions of Hillary Clinton =

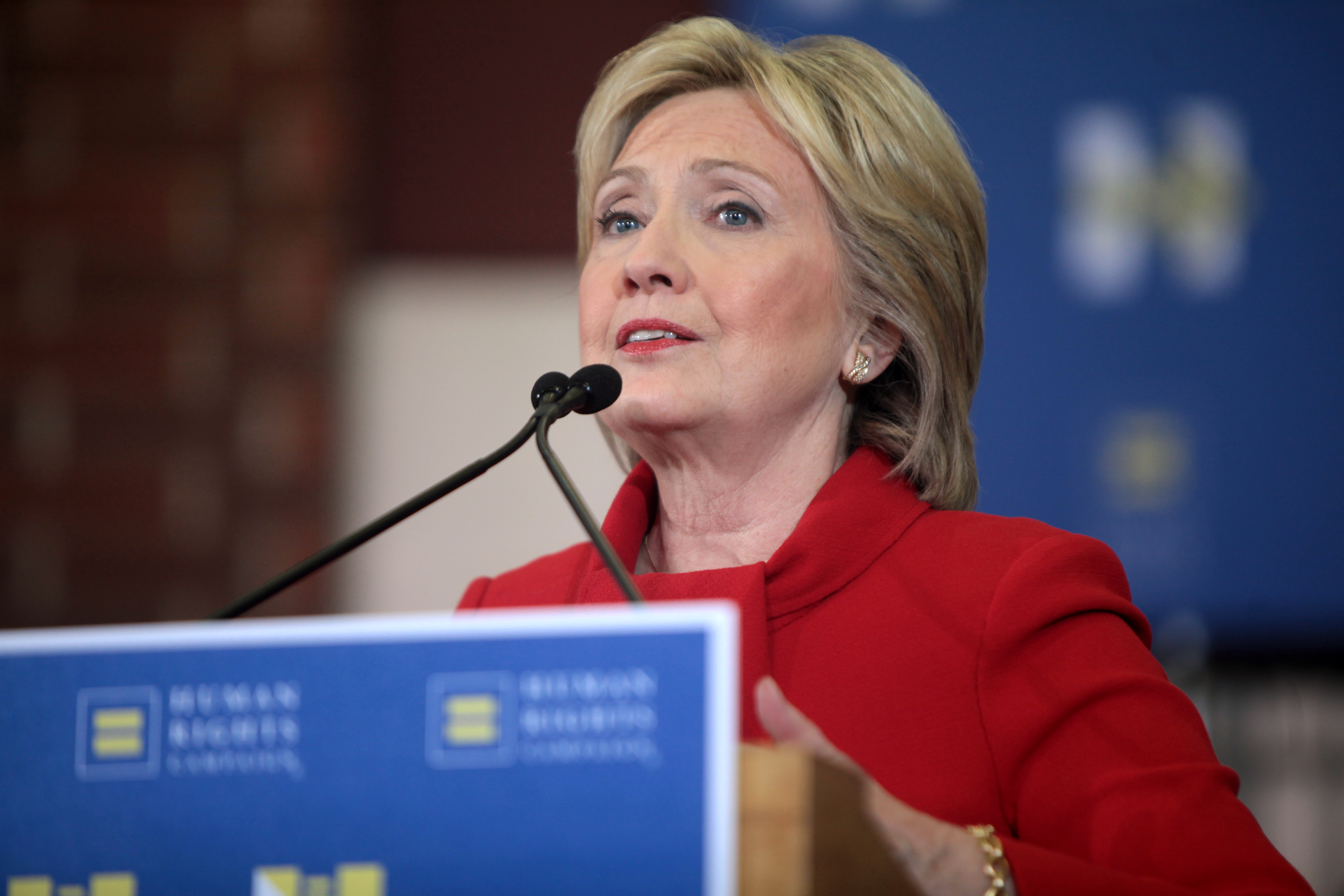
Hillary Clinton speaking at a "Get Out the Caucus" rally in Des Moines, Iowa, as part of her 2016 presidential campaign

Hillary Clinton, the nominee of the Democratic Party for president of the United States in 2016, has taken positions on political issues while serving as First Lady of Arkansas (1979–81; 1983–92), First Lady of the United States (1993–2001); as U.S. Senator from New York (2001–2009); and serving as the United States Secretary of State (2009–2013).

In accordance with longstanding custom, during her time as Secretary of State she largely avoided taking stances on most domestic political issues. In 2015, she announced her candidacy for the presidency. Clinton won the Democratic primaries defeating Bernie Sanders and formally became the party's nominee at the 2016 Democratic National Convention. She lost the 2016 US presidential election to billionaire real estate mogul and Republican nominee Donald Trump.

Over her career, Clinton has developed a reputation as a "policy wonk" who frequently consults with expert advisors and is deeply involved in the details of policy proposals. By August 2016, the Clinton campaign had released 38 policy proposals and 65 fact-sheets, totaling 112,735 words.

== Political philosophy ==
=== In her own words ===
In her 1996 book It Takes a Village, Clinton writes, "Most of us would describe ourselves as 'middle of the road'—liberal in some areas, conservative in others, moderate in most, neither exclusively pro- nor anti-government." Clinton has stated that she prefers the term "progressive" to "liberal", explaining that "Unfortunately, in the last 30, 40 years, [the word 'liberal'] has been turned up on its head and it's been made to seem as though it is a word that describes big government, totally contrary to what its meaning was in the 19th and early 20th century. I prefer the word 'progressive,' which has a real American meaning, going back to the Progressive Era at the beginning of the 20th century." Yale historian Beverly Gage claims this was due to the fact that "liberal" was considered "a term of opprobrium" by the time Bill and Hillary became involved in national politics, while the term "progressive" has consistently referred to vaguely positive notions of progress, from Republicans and Democrats alike, especially with regard to the Progressive Era.

At a Democratic primary debate in June 2007, in response to the question of whether she would describe herself as a liberal, Clinton said: "I consider myself a modern progressive, someone who believes strongly in individual rights and freedoms, who believes that we are better as a society when we're working together and when we find ways to help those who may not have all the advantages in life get the tools they need to lead a more productive life for themselves and their family. So I consider myself a proud modern American progressive, and I think that's the kind of philosophy and practice that we need to bring back to American politics."

In a September 2015 Women for Hillary event, Clinton said, "You know, I get accused of being kind of moderate and center. I plead guilty."

When asked by Anderson Cooper in October 2015 how she reconciles being both a progressive and moderate, "Do you change your political identity based on who you're talking to? Just for the record, are you a progressive or a moderate?", Hillary answered "I'm a progressive. But I'm a progressive who likes to get things done. And I know how to find common ground, and I know how to stand my ground, and I have proved that in every position that I've had, even dealing with Republicans who never had a good word to say about me, honestly."

=== Scales and rankings ===
Clinton's 2015 Crowdpac rating was −6.4 on a left-right scale, where −10 is the most liberal and 10 is the most conservative. The score is an aggregate of primarily campaign contributions but also votes and speeches. This represents a slight rightward shift from her 2008 rating of −6.9.

Clinton is rated a "Hard-Core Liberal" according to the OnTheIssues.org scale, which is based on her public statements on social and economic issues. According to FiveThirtyEight's review of this and other analyses, "Clinton was one of the most liberal members during her time in the Senate", slightly more liberal than Barack Obama, "as liberal as Elizabeth Warren and barely more moderate than Bernie Sanders". A New York Times analysis found that Clinton and Bernie Sanders voted the same 93 percent of the time in the two years they shared in the Senate (2007–2009), but also noted key areas of disagreement which possibly reflected "political calculations by Mrs. Clinton, who was preparing for a presidential run in 2008"

Clinton "was the 11th most liberal member of the Senate" according to DW-NOMINATE, a multidimensional scaling method based on legislative votes.

==== Interest groups ====
Clinton's lifetime rating from the American Conservative Union (based on Senate votes) is 8.13%, similar to that of Senator Bernie Sanders (I-VT) and Senator Elizabeth Warren (D-MA).

== Economic policy ==
Clinton giving a keynote on American economic mobility in 2014

=== General ===
In 2015, Vox reported that Clinton was more economically progressive than Obama and former President Bill Clinton, and had a more progressive voting record than Obama when they were both senators.

The 2016 Clinton campaign's in-house economic advisors were Michael Shapiro and Michael Schmidt, who worked on economic policy in the Obama administration. The campaign's external advisory group included professors Alan Krueger, Alan Blinder, Joseph Stiglitz, Simon Johnson, Aaron Chatterji, and Christina Romer, as well as Heather Boushey, an expert on inequality and paid family leave.

Moody's Analytics claimed Clinton's economic proposals would "result in a stronger U.S. economy under almost any scenario", saying they would, if enacted, create 10.4 million jobs during a four-year presidential term (3.2 million more than expected under current law). GDP growth would be 2.7%, as opposed to the 2.3% which was expected under current law until 2020. They noted that her immigration proposal and paid family leave proposal would increase the number of workers, and that her infrastructure spending would help business productivity.

Clinton's infrastructure plan was praised by economists across the political spectrum.[page no longer exists] One exception is John H. Cochrane, an economist who argued that Clinton's infrastructure spending plan would have limited effects on economic growth. Roughly 70% of the economists polled in late July said a Clinton victory in November would be positive for economic growth (compared with just under 14% for Trump). 55% of business economists in August felt that Clinton would do the best job as president of managing the U.S. economy (with 14% choosing Trump). Meanwhile, 13 of the 20 former Democratic members of the White House Council of Economic Advisers openly supported Clinton, and none opposed her. 19 Nobel laureates in economics signed a letter endorsing Clinton, saying she was better for the economy and country than Donald Trump.

=== Bankruptcy ===
In 2001, Clinton voted to advance a bankruptcy reform bill that would have made it more difficult for borrowers to discharge their debt as part of bankruptcy proceedings. She stated that her vote was contingent on the inclusion of provisions intended to protect women, including allowing them to collect child support payments if the father declared bankruptcy. Credit card companies, banks, and women's groups supported the bill, while consumer groups opposed it. Clinton explained, "I will not vote for final passage of this bill if it comes back from conference if these kind of reforms are missing". The bill did not come up for a final vote that legislative session. When similar legislation came up again in 2005, without the amendments added by Democrats in 2001, she opposed it.

In 2006 and 2007, while in the Senate, Clinton introduced the Student Borrower Bill of Rights. The legislation would have made it easier for "cash-strapped student borrowers to pay back their loans, have their loans refinanced, qualify for income-based loan payments, and discharge student debt in bankruptcy." The legislation did not pass at the time.

=== Campaign finance ===
In 2002, Clinton voted for the Bipartisan Campaign Reform Act, which imposed restrictions on soft money and political campaign advertising. In 2007, she spoke in favor of public financing of some campaigns: "I believe we have to move, eventually in our country, toward a system of public financing that really works for candidates running for federal office. I will support that as president." However, her own fundraising allowed her to opt out of the 30 year-old public financing scheme for presidential elections, a move followed by the other candidates for the democratic nomination: Barack Obama and John Edwards. In 2016, Clinton proposed a public financing system that would amplify small contributions.

In 2016, Clinton said that she would, if elected president, introduce a constitutional amendment within her first 30 days in office to overturn the Supreme Court's controversial decision in Citizens United v. FEC (2010), which "launched a new era of unbridled fundraising" in U.S. elections. Clinton said that she would appoint Supreme Court justices who would overturn Citizens United, stating she wanted to "protect the right to vote and [not] protect the right of billionaires to buy elections." Legislation would have been pushed demanding more "effective" disclosure of political spending by outside groups and, if Congress did not act, to sign an executive order requiring federal government contractors to disclose all political spending.

=== Capitalism and economic philosophy ===
In a 1996 interview, Clinton commented on the relationship between government and the private sector, saying: "I just believe that there's got to be a healthy tension among all of our institutions in society, and that the market is the driving force behind our prosperity, our freedom in so many respects to make our lives our own but that it cannot be permitted just to run roughshod over people's lives as well."

In a speech in October 2014, Clinton stated "Don't let anybody tell you that it's corporations and businesses that create jobs. You know that old theory, trickle-down economics. That has been tried; that has failed. It has failed rather spectacularly."

In July 2015, Clinton condemned what she called "short-termism" and "quarterly capitalism"—"the obsession with share prices and quarterly earnings over real value creation, which Clinton views as dangerous to the economy." Clinton called for "new, creative, disruptive ideas to save capitalism" and has said that capitalism "needs to be reinvented, it needs to be put back into balance."

In a Democratic primary debate in October 2015 with her rival, Bernie Sanders, Clinton said: "When I think about capitalism I think about all the business that started because they had the opportunity and the freedom to do that and to make a good living for themselves and their families ... We would be making a grave mistake to turn our backs on what built the greatest middle class in history." Unlike Sanders, Clinton is not a supporter of the Nordic model, saying in the same debate: "We are not Denmark. I love Denmark, but we are the United States of America, and it's our job to rein in the excesses of capitalism so it doesn't run amok." and "what we have to do every so often in America ... is save capitalism from itself."

Noting that the U.S. economy has performed better under Democratic presidents than Republican ones since World War II, Clinton has said: "The economy does better when you have a Democrat in the White House and that's why we need to have a Democrat in the White House in January 2017." Analysis by Max Ehrenfreund in The Washington Post noted that Clinton's statement was accurate but also noted it was difficult to say how much credit the White House could take for such economic upturns; or if other factors boost the economy and Democrats "just got lucky".

In March 2016, she laid out a detailed economic plan, which The New York Times called "optimistic" and "wide-ranging". Basing her economic philosophy on inclusive capitalism, Clinton proposed a "clawback" which would rescind tax relief and other benefits for companies that move jobs overseas; providing incentives for companies that share profits with employees, communities and the environment, rather than focusing on short-term profits to increase stock value and rewarding shareholders; increasing collective bargaining rights; and placing an "exit tax" on companies that move their headquarters out of America in order to pay a lower tax rate overseas.

=== Child care ===
In 2015, Clinton proposed to cap the expenses that a household spends on child care at 10 percent of a household's income. Clinton intended to accomplish the 10 percent cap with tax credits and subsidized child care.

=== Financial regulation and Wall Street reform ===
Clinton called for more robust financial regulation early on in the 2008 financial crisis, specifically for regulations to crack down on financial derivatives and subprime mortgages, and strengthen oversight of financial institutions and private-equity markets. She wanted "major federal intervention in the market for subprime loans", arguing that Wall Street "has played a significant role in our current problems", including the housing crisis.'" She supported the subsequent Dodd–Frank Wall Street Reform and Consumer Protection Act of 2010, a major overhaul of U.S. financial regulations enacted in the wake of the Great Recession. Several key architects and supports of the act were Clinton supporters who advised her on financial regulations during her 2016 campaign.

In 2016, Clinton proposed to impose a tax on types of high-frequency trading that she describes as "harmful". Her official platform said, "In particular, the tax would hit HFT strategies involving excessive levels of order cancellations, which make our markets less stable and less fair."

In December 2015, Clinton outlined her plans for regulating Wall Street, writing that she "would not only veto any legislation that would weaken financial reform, but I would also fight for tough new rules, stronger enforcement, and more accountability that go well beyond Dodd-Frank." She also called for an enhanced Volcker rule that would close "loopholes that still allow banks to make speculative gambles with taxpayer-backed deposits." She did not support reinstating the Glass-Steagall Act, a law (repealed in 1999) that mandated the separation of commercial and investment banks, preferring instead other tools to combat systemic risk. This included "a 'risk fee' on financial institutions with assets over $50 billion, regulations on the 'shadow banking' sector (i.e. hedge funds), and guidelines for prosecuting financial wrongdoing."

Clinton received criticism for her ties with Wall Street. Her claim in April 2016 that she was "the only candidate in the Democratic primary, or actually on either side, who Wall Street financiers and hedge fund managers are actually running ads against," was reported by PolitiFact as a lie. They found that all the candidates had been the target of attacks by "Wall Street funded groups", and that Trump had received the most of all the presidential candidates. Also, the Clinton-affiliated super PAC, Priorities USA Action, received a third of its contributions from the financial industry. Clinton received 53% of campaign contributions from Wall Street in March 2016, up from 32% and 33% in January and February respectively.

=== Fiscal policy and taxation ===
A graphic from Clinton's website in 2006

In a 2005 fund-raising speech, she was highly critical of the Bush tax cuts, saying that "Many of you are well enough off that the tax cuts may have helped you. We're saying that for America to get back on track, we're probably going to cut that short and not give it to you. We're going to take things away from you on behalf of the common good." In January 2008, Clinton called upon Congress to pass an economic stimulus package (totaling as much as $110 billion) to deal with the effects of a possible recession. The package would consist of funds to help deal with the effect of the subprime mortgage crisis, to help lower-income families pay for higher home energy costs, to extend unemployment insurance, and to possibly provide some tax refunds.

During her 2016 campaign for the presidency, Clinton has pledged not to raise taxes on working and middle-class families, defined as those with annual incomes below $250,000; this was controversial within the Democratic Party. In April 2016, Clinton expressed support for taxes on sugary drinks. This was criticized by Bernie Sanders, who opposes such taxes, and he contended that they would violate her pledge not to raises taxes of families with incomes below $250,000. A Coca-Cola executive later said that she had received assurances from the Clinton campaign that they would no longer comment on the soda tax.

Clinton proposed a number of new tax credits, including a new caregiver credit of up to $1,200 a credit for up to $5,000 per family (to those paying out-of-pocket healthcare costs in excess of 5 percent of their annual income), and a credit aimed at families paying for college. She also proposed to simplify tax filings for small businesses, citing research showing that small businesses currently spend 20 times more per employee to prepare their taxes.

In December 2015, Clinton outlined a plan to crack down on corporate tax inversions, described by Richard Phillips of the Citizens for Tax Justice as "a loophole through which U.S. companies pretend to be foreign in order to avoid taxes". She specifically criticized Pfizer's plan to make use of the controversial tax-avoidance maneuver by means of its proposed merger with Allergan. Phillips praised Clinton for her position on inversions, but criticized her proposal to use the new revenue to reduce corporate taxes, arguing that the revenue should go toward public investments or deficit reduction instead. She also expressed support for stripping tax benefits from companies that outsource jobs overseas.

In May 2016, the Committee for a Responsible Federal Budget (CRFB) estimated that Clinton's proposals would cost $1.80 trillion over a decade with interest, and would be heavily paid for with $1.60 trillion of offsets (primarily from taxes on high earners). She also proposed the "New College Compact": which would expand the Affordable Care Act, early childhood education, and paid family leave, increase spending on infrastructure and funding for veterans, and expand research funding. The CRFB concluded that the policies "would not substantially add to current law debt levels", but would keep debt (which was increasing as a percentage of GDP) at historically high post-war levels. In December 2016, McClatchy newspapers concluded that her proposals would cost "at least $1.1 trillion over 10 years", as billions would be spent on reducing college costs, increasing treatment for drug addiction, and helping employers pay for mandatory family and sick leave. This would be mostly offset by new revenue.

In March 2016, the Tax Policy Center summarized Clinton's tax proposals: she would raise taxes on high-income taxpayers, modify taxation of multinational corporations, repeal fossil fuel tax incentives, and increase estate and gift taxes. They estimated the proposals would increase revenue by $1.1 trillion over the next decade, and that nearly all of the tax increases would fall on the top 1 percent. They said marginal tax rates would increase, "reducing incentives to work, save, and invest", and the tax code would become more complex. They did not address her forthcoming proposal to cut taxes for low- and middle-income families.

Clinton specifically proposed a 4% surcharge on taxpayers earning over $5 million a year, a 30% minimum tax rate on millionaires (defined as those with adjusted gross incomes above $1 million), a 28% cap on most deductions, and increased taxes on long-term capital gains. It would have increased several business taxes, and penalized excessive risk-taking in the financial sector. However, it would have also created incentives for business programs, and would have helped workers and communities in distress.

The conservative Tax Foundation estimated in January 2016 that, in the long term, the plan would decrease economic growth by 1%, wages by 0.8%, and jobs by 311,000. They predicted an increase in revenues of $498 billion, but applied dynamic scoring analysis to that figure and reduced it to $191 billion, due to weaker economic growth. The Clinton campaign said "the Tax Foundation's analysis is misleading, and doesn't take into account her tax relief for businesses and individuals, nor her investments that would promote growth."

=== Health care ===
A 2016 RAND Corporation report analyzed four of Clinton's major proposed health-care policies and concluded that their combined effect, relative to current law, would be "to increase the number of insured by 9.1 million and increase the federal deficit by $88.5 billion." The report found that Clinton's plans would lower expenses, mainly for low- and moderate-income people; the greatest reductions in out-of-pocket spending under Clinton's plan would benefit Americans with incomes between 139 and 250 percent of the federal poverty level (i.e., $33,534 to $60,750 for a family of four).

==== Medicaid ====
Her 2016 plan proposed to encourage states to expand Medicaid by giving each signatory state a 100% match for the first three years. It also proposed an investment of $500 million per year in advertisements to encourage those eligible for Medicaid but not enrolled to enroll.

==== Medicare ====
Under Clinton's 2016 health care plan, people over 55 years old would be allowed to buy into Medicare if they wanted to. Currently, only those age 65 and over are covered by under Medicare. According to experts consulted by PolitiFact, nothing in Clinton's health care plan would undermine Medicare or harm current beneficiaries.

Clinton supports allowing Medicare to negotiate drug prices.

==== Mental health ====
On mental health, Clinton has proposed investing in brain and behavioral science research; fully enforcing existing laws that require mental health coverage to be an essential benefit in health insurance plans; creating a national suicide prevention initiative; expanding the reimbursement structures in Medicare and Medicaid; tasking the Center for Medicare and Medicaid Innovation to create and implement the new payment models; emphasizing; treatment over jail for low-level criminal offenders with mental health issues; and creating new housing and job opportunities for mentally ill Americans. Clinton's plan states that "the next generation must grow up knowing that mental health is a key component of overall health and there is no shame, stigma, or barriers to seeking out care."

As Senator, Clinton sponsored the Mental Health Parity and Addiction Equity Act of 2008, which requires that limits on mental health benefits to be no lower than the limits for medical and surgical benefits offered by health insurance plans.

==== Other ====
As First Lady of the United States, she worked with Senators Ted Kennedy and Orrin Hatch to develop the State Children's Health Insurance Program, which provides health insurance to children belonging to families with incomes below 200% of the federal poverty line but are too well-off to apply for Medicaid, and was signed into law by Bill Clinton in 1997 as a part of the Balanced Budget Act of 1997.

While Senator, Clinton supported a 2007 proposal to increase funding for SCHIP by $35 billion over five years.

==== Prescription drugs ====
Clinton proposed to redirect subsidies that go to direct-to-consumer drug company advertising to research and development of drugs; health insurance plans would be required to place a monthly limit of $250 on covered out-of-pocket prescription drug costs for individuals. She proposed to "fully fund the FDA's Office of Generic Drugs to clear out their multi-year generic drug approval backlog" and lower the exclusivity period of "biologics" from 12 to 7 years to "spur greater competition" and save government spending. Her prescription drug plan said that she would seek to prohibit "pay for delay" arrangements, referring to arrangements where patent holders make payments to potential competitors to stop them from entering the market with generic drugs.

In June 2015, when TPP was still being negotiated, Clinton said that drug firms that benefit from deal should offer discounts. One of her stated reasons for opposing the final version of TPP is that it put "the interests of drug companies ahead of patients and consumers".

==== Universal health care and the Affordable Care Act ====
In a speech to Harvard Medical School in June 1998, Clinton outlined general support for federal universal affordable health care for Americans. "There are 41 million people without health insurance. Who will take care of these people in the future? How will we pay for their care? How will we pay for the extra costs that come when someone is not treated for a chronic disease or turned away from the emergency room? The job of health care reform cannot be done when access to care depends on skin color or the neighborhood they live in or the amount of money in their wallet. Let's continue to work toward universal affordable, quality health care."

Reportedly, Clinton expressed support when she was First Lady for universal single-payer health care in the U.S. during multiple private conversations, while sometimes indicating that she believed such an approach would not be politically tenable.

Clinton later said that health care coverage improvements need to be made incrementally, in contrast to the more ambitious, wide-ranging plan that failed in 1993 to 1994.

In September 2007, as part of her presidential campaign, Clinton proposed her own health system reform plan (dubbed the "American Health Choices Plan"), which would have required that individuals have health care coverage from some source. The coverage options available would be: enrollment in private insurance plans via an "individual mandate" and an "employer mandate" requiring employers to provide health care benefits, or enrollment in a public program via an expanded version of Medicare or federal employee health plans. The projected cost of the plan was $110 billion annually, and would have required all employers to cover their employees' health insurance or contribute to the costs of their employees' health insurance coverage; tax credits would have been provided to companies with fewer than 25 employees to help cover costs. In order to pay for the program's estimated $110 billion annual cost, she favored repealing some of the Bush tax cuts for those earning more than $250,000.

In January 2016, Clinton said that single-payer healthcare "will never, ever come to pass." She does not disagree with the idea of single-payer healthcare (which she has advocated in the past), finding it instead impractical. She proposes to defend the Affordable Care Act from efforts to repeal it; she will build upon it. In July 2016, Clinton proposed to make Affordable Care Act funding for Federally Qualified Health Centers (such as community health centers) permanent, and expand the funding by $40 billion over the next 10 years.

Clinton claimed during a debate in January 2016 that "We now have driven (health care) costs down to the lowest they've been in 50 years". PolitiFact rated this statement "false," noting that "although the rate of growth has been at historic lows, the actual per-person cost of health care has increased steadily over the last half century."

===== Public option =====
Clinton supports federal and state efforts to create Medicare-like "public option" health insurance plans to compete against private insurers. According to a RAND Corporation study, Clinton's public option would provide insurance to 400,000 additional Americans and reduce the deficit by $700 million.

==== Vaccines ====
According to Vox, of the top four 2016 presidential candidates (Clinton, Trump, Gary Johnson, and Jill Stein), Clinton is "the only candidate not pandering to the anti-vaccine movement" and the only candidate with views on vaccines that are consistent with the scientific consensus. During her campaign, she wrote: "Through vaccinations and vaccine science, I am committed to protecting our nation's children, as well as populations worldwide, from infectious disease threats." Clinton has said that if elected president, she will work globally toward the elimination of vaccine-preventable infections such as measles, whooping cough, and diphtheria and domestically to "educate parents about vaccines, focusing on their extraordinary track record in saving lives and pointing out the dangers of not vaccinating our children." Clinton has criticized Republicans who have called vaccine science into question, writing, "The earth is round, the sky is blue, and #vaccineswork. Let's protect all our kids."

On a candidates' questionnaire in 2008, when asked whether "vaccines should be investigated as a possible cause of autism?," Clinton wrote: "I am committed to make investments to find the causes of autism, including possible environmental causes like vaccines. ... We don't know what, if any, kind of link there is between vaccines and autism — but we should find out." This statement was made two years before 2010, when a study published in 1998 alleging that the MMR vaccine caused autism was retracted after it was found to have been fraudulent.

In 1993, as first lady, Clinton was a key supporter of the program that became the Centers for Disease Control and Prevention's Vaccines for Children program, which provides free inoculations for eligible children.

=== Jobs, labor, and employment ===
==== Job creation ====
Moody's Analytics found in 2016 that Clinton's proposals would, if enacted, create 10.4 million jobs during a four-year presidential term (3.2 million more than expected under current law). The report used a forecasting model similar to those used by the Congressional Budget Office (CBO) and the Federal Reserve.

Clinton has proposed to put her husband Bill "in charge of revitalizing the economy" in her administration, citing economic growth under his Presidency (1993–2001).

==== Infrastructure ====
Her 2016 official platform claimed that investments in "infrastructure, clean energy, and scientific and medical research" will create jobs during her administration. In November 2015, her five-year, $275-billion federal infrastructure program "aimed at creating middle-class jobs" was described by the New York Times as "the most sprawling — and costliest — government program of her campaign to date". She has proposed a $30 billion plan for coal-producing areas, which is partly intended to help displaced coal workers find new jobs.

==== Regulations and licensing ====
In her book Hard Choices, Clinton wrote that there were regulatory hurdles for businesses to create jobs in America and India, saying, "There were still too many barriers and restrictions, but American companies were slowly gaining access to Indian markets, creating jobs and opportunities for people in both countries."

Clinton proposes to reduce unnecessary occupational licensing requirements to ease burdens on small business owners. She argues that this will help small businesses, in particular, by reducing the time and costs associated with licensing. She has proposed to incentivize states and localities to make licensing cheaper, easier and streamlined by providing federal funding to support innovative programs and offset forgone licensing revenue. She says she will work with states to standardize licensing requirements and reduce barriers for Americans seeking to work across state borders.

==== Labor unions ====
While a U.S. senator, Clinton "was a reliable labor ally, co-sponsoring, for instance, the pro-labor Employee Free Choice Act ('card check'), which cleared the House in 2007, but was filibustered in the Senate." During her 2016 campaign, Clinton has pledged to "restore collective bargaining rights for unions and defend against partisan attacks on workers' rights."

In August 2016, Clinton said that "strengthening unions doesn't just serve members – it leads to better pay, and benefits, and working conditions for all employees." According to NPR, there is evidence to support that assertion.

==== Manufacturing ====
Clinton has stated that "manufacturing is critical to the U.S. economy." Clinton wants to create tax incentives to encourage investment in communities that face significant manufacturing job losses, and has proposed a tax penalty for companies that move jobs or production overseas. She has said that she will "aggressively [combat] trade violations" by other countries.

Clinton has pledged to build and expand upon President Obama's support for a National Network for Manufacturing Innovation, which focuses on developing and commercializing manufacturing technologies through public-private partnerships between U.S. industry, universities, and federal agencies.

==== Minimum wage ====
During her 2016 campaign, Clinton proposed raising the federal minimum wage to $12 an hour. Clinton has expressed support for the "Fight for $15" campaign for higher minimum wages in individual states and cities (such as New York, Los Angeles, Detroit and St. Louis). At a Democratic primary debate in 2016, Clinton said that if Congress passes a bill for a $15 federal minimum wage, she would sign it. She explained her decision to support a $12 an hour federal minimum wage by invoking the research of Princeton professor Alan Krueger.

As a Senator, Clinton voted for an increase in the federal minimum wage. In 2014, Clinton said: "Don't let anyone tell you that raising the minimum wage will kill jobs – they always say that. I've been through this. My husband gave workers a raise in the 1990s. I voted to raise the minimum wage and guess what, millions of jobs were created or paid better and more families were secure." She followed that statement by saying "[a]nd don't let anybody tell you that it's corporations and businesses that create jobs. You know that old theory, trickle-down economics. That has been tried, that has failed. It has failed rather spectacularly." She has described the current federal minimum wage of $7.25 as a "starvation wage".

==== Paid family leave ====
Clinton supports 12 weeks of paid family and medical leave at a minimum two-thirds wage replacement rate. She would pay for this plan with increased taxes on the wealthy. She opposes pending similar legislation, called the Family Act, because it relies on a small increase to the payroll tax.

=== Social Security ===
Clinton opposes cutting Social Security. She instead supports an expansion of Social Security: boosting survivor benefits and creating a caregiver benefit for those who left the paid workforce to care for children, parents or ailing family members. Her expansion of Social Security has been criticized by the Progressive Change Campaign Committee for not going far enough. Clinton opposes a raise in the retirement age.

In 2008, Clinton supporting retaining the cap on the Federal Insurance Contributions Act (FICA) tax, the payroll tax which funds Social Security and Medicare. Under the cap at that time, the FICA tax applied to income up to $102,000, with income in excess of this amount (earned by the top 6% of income-earners) not taxable. Clinton said that a repeal of the FICA tax cap would amount to a "tax increase on the middle class."

=== Student loans ===
Clinton's plan for student debt relief is to allow those carrying existing student debt to refinance their student loans at current rates available to students taking out new loans. The Clinton campaign asserts that her plan "will cost around $350 billion over 10 years—and will be fully paid for by limiting certain tax expenditures for high-income taxpayers." The campaign estimates that 25 million borrowers will obtain relief, with the average borrower saving about $2,000 in total.

Clinton proposes to permit start-up founders and early employees to forgo payments on their federal student loans for up to three years. Those who launch businesses that provide social benefits would also be permitted to apply for forgiveness of up to $17,500 of their debt after five years.

=== Subprime mortgage crisis relief ===
On December 5, 2007, Clinton unveiled her plan to ameliorate the effects of the subprime mortgage crisis on homeowners. She called for a 90-day moratorium on foreclosures, in order that lenders and mortgage servicers have sufficient time to get through paperwork complications and an expected high volume of troubled borrowers without having to shut out the lights, and a five-year freeze on the interest rates of adjustable rate mortgages, so that borrowers would not get slammed by expected 30, 40 or more percent increases in monthly payments due to the effects of the crisis and of unwise initial borrowing decisions.

In late 2008, Clinton voted for the Troubled Asset Relief Program which provided $350 million to purchase toxic assets and equity from financial institutions to strengthen the financial sector during the subprime mortgage crisis.

Clinton claimed during a nationally televised townhall meeting in February 2016 that "You are three times more likely to be able to get a mortgage if you're a white applicant than if you're black or Hispanic, even if you have the same credentials." PolitiFact rated this claim "false," noting "while there is evidence of disparities in mortgage acceptance rates by race ... Experts say the gaps are not as drastic as Clinton says once you equalize for other key factors, such as income and credit history."

=== Trade ===
Clinton supported the proposed Trans-Pacific Partnership (TPP) during her tenure as Secretary of State. During her presidential campaign, Clinton opposed the TPP, supported the U.S. Export-Import Bank, and held that "any trade deal has to produce jobs and raise wages and increase prosperity and protect our security". As Senator (2001–2009), her record on trade was mixed, voting in favor of some trade agreements but not others. She favors Trade Adjustment Assistance, a measure that would help retrain and provide aid to workers displaced by globalization.

==== NAFTA ====
During the 1993 internal debate over the North American Free Trade Agreement, Clinton made clear her feeling that its passage was getting higher priority within the administration than it should, especially compared to the Clinton health care reform plan. By most accounts, Clinton was also unenthusiastic about the merits of the agreement, believing it would cause a loss of American jobs and would be politically unpopular. Once her husband decided to proceed with NAFTA, Clinton as First Lady participated in at least five meetings at the White House aimed at securing Congressional passage of the agreement, which Gergen and former official Robert J. Shapiro felt showed she had been a "good soldier" in getting behind a settled decision, but which other attendees interpreted as showing Clinton was in fact behind the agreement. During later years of the administration and in her memoir, Clinton touted her husband's support for NAFTA.

Clinton has since 2008 repeatedly called for renegotiating the "core labor and environmental standards" of NAFTA. During her 2008 presidential campaign, Clinton repeatedly criticized the NAFTA agreement, despite it being one of the major achievements of her husband's administration. She said, "NAFTA did not do what many had hoped. NAFTA was a mistake to the extent that it did not deliver on what we had hoped it would." She did say that she believed in the underlying idea behind trade agreements such as NAFTA: "I believe in the general principles it represented. But what we have learned is that we have to drive a tougher bargain. Our market is the market that everybody wants to be in. We should quit giving it away so willy-nilly. I believe we need tougher enforcement of the trade agreements we already have." She promised that if elected, she would work to implement changes to it that would benefit American workers, saying "I want to be a president who focuses on smart, pro-American trade. I will review every trade agreement. I'm going to ask for revisions that I think will actually benefit our country, particularly our workers, our exporters ... And NAFTA will be part of that review, to try to reform and improve it."

==== Other ====
In 2005, while representing New York in the U.S. Senate, Clinton said: "During my tenure as senator, I have voted for every trade agreement that has come before the Senate, and I believe that properly negotiated trade agreements can increase living standards and foster openness and economic development for all parties." Later in 2005, Clinton voted against the Central America Free Trade Agreement, believing that it did not provide adequate environmental or labor standards. As Secretary of State, Clinton adhered to the position of the Obama administration on the United States–Colombia Free Trade Agreement, supporting the agreement that she had opposed in the 2008 campaign given her "concerns about the history of violence towards trade unionists in Colombia".

Clinton, together with fellow New York Senator Charles Schumer, welcomed a 2006 decision by the United States Commerce Department that called for a 108.3% duty on imports from Chinese candlemakers, as the imports sought to circumvent an Anti-dumping Duty Order. Clinton stated, "This is a real victory for the Syracuse candle-making industry."

Clinton supports the U.S. Export-Import Bank, a decades-old trade promotion agency. She has asserted that "across our country, the Export-Import Bank supports up to 164,000 jobs."

In August 2016, Clinton promised to create a new position of trade prosecutor and to triple the number of enforcers. In the same speech, she said that "China and other countries have gamed the system for too long","Enforcement — especially during the Bush administration — has been too lax" and that "Investments at home that would make us more competitive have been blocked." She said, however, that "the answer is not to rant and rave – or to cut ourselves off from the world. That would kill even more jobs."

==== Trans-Pacific Partnership ====
Former top Obama adviser David Axelrod said on MSNBC that when Hillary Clinton was secretary of state from 2009 to 2013, she "owned" the 12-nation Trans-Pacific Partnership (TPP). During her tenure as Secretary of State, she spoke of the TPP negotiations in glowing terms, such as "the gold standard in trade agreements." In February 2013, Clinton left her job with the general framework of TPP in place. In her 2014 memoir Hard Choices, she wrote:

"Because TPP negotiations are still ongoing, it makes sense to reserve judgment until we can evaluate the final proposed agreement. It's safe to say the TPP won't be perfect -- no deal negotiated among a dozen countries ever will be -- but its higher standards, if implemented and enforced, should benefit American businesses and workers."

In an April 2015 presidential campaign stop in New Hampshire, Clinton said, "Any trade deal has to produce jobs and raise wages and increase prosperity and protect our security". Upon the completion of the TPP negotiations in October 2015, Clinton stated her opposition to the TPP, indicating that the final agreement did not meet the high standards she had set for such agreements. PolitiFact rules her shifting stance on TPP as a flip-flop. In August 2016, Clinton said, "I will stop any trade deal that kills jobs or holds down wages – including the Trans-Pacific Partnership. I oppose it now, I'll oppose it after the election, and I'll oppose it as president."

Clinton has named former Senator Ken Salazar, who is a prominent supporter of TPP, to chair her presidential transition team.

== Energy and environment policy ==
Clinton supports energy conservation, releasing oil reserves, increasing the number of hydrogen-powered vehicles, and ratification of the Kyoto Protocol. She opposes drilling in the Arctic National Wildlife Refuge and the Bush administration's energy policy.

Clinton supports cap-and-trade, which allows companies to trade carbon credits, seeks an 80% carbon cut by 2050, seeks a 10% national energy reduction by 2020, advocates a zero emission policy for federal buildings by 2030, calls for raising gas mileage standards to 35 mpg_{‑US} (6.7 L/100 km) within 10 years (having indicated a willingness to use administrative power if Congress fails to act on this), and opposes drilling in the Atlantic.

Clinton was endorsed by the League of Conservation Voters in 2015.

=== Climate change and renewable energy ===
Clinton accepts the scientific consensus on climate change and criticizes climate-change deniers "who still refuse to accept the settled science of climate change." Clinton called climate change "an urgent threat" and "the most consequential, urgent, sweeping collection of challenges we face as a nation and a world."

Clinton writes in her memoir Hard Choices that during her tenure in the State Department she played an instrumental role in the push toward an enforceable international agreement to reduce carbon emissions. In December 2009, as secretary of state, Clinton endorsed a climate-change adaption plan, stating: "The United States is prepared to work with other countries toward a goal of jointly mobilizing $100 billion a year by 2020 to address the climate change needs of developing countries." The commitment was welcomed by German Chancellor Angela Merkel and others as a solid first step, although the European Union made a more ambitious proposal for 100 billion euros a year (44% higher than the value Clinton mentioned). Clinton did not say specifically how much the U.S. would contribute, but did say that U.S. funding of climate-change mitigation efforts would be conditional upon China and other nations agreeing to "transparency" and verification of cuts in greenhouse gas emissions.

In July 2015, Clinton set forth two ambitious renewable energy goals for the United States: to generate enough clean renewable energy to power every U.S. home within ten years after taking office, and to install 500 million solar panels within her first term. Clinton aims to generate one-third of America's electricity from renewable sources by 2027. Clinton said in February 2016 that these proposals aim to "move from fossil fuels to clean energy ... in a quick, but thoughtful way" and to "reduce greenhouse gas emissions by up to 30 percent in 2025 relative to 2005 levels and chart a path to cut emissions more than 80 percent by 2050." Clinton states: "I want more wind, more solar, more advanced biofuels, more energy efficiency." Clinton supports the wind energy production tax credit and has called for making it permanent, and in the past has praised efforts to use vegetable oils as alternative energy.

Clinton has emphasized the jobs that renewable energy creates, saying in an April 2016 town-hall event broadcast on MSNBC that the U.S. must "use clean renewable energy to create more jobs." Clinton has said that "somebody is going to be the 21st century clean energy superpower. It's either going to be China, Germany or us. I want it to be us because there will be a lot of jobs, again, that have to be done right here in America." On one occasion in December 2015, Clinton stated that "we now have more jobs in solar than we do in oil"; PolitiFact found that this was not true, although the number of workers in the oil and gas industry has been declining while the number of workers employees in the solar industry has increased.

Clinton has praised the international Paris Agreement reached at the 2015 United Nations Climate Change Conference, saying: "The Paris agreement is testament to America's ability to lead the world in building a clean energy future where no one is left out or left behind ... as president, I will make combating climate change a top priority from day one, and secure America's future as the clean energy superpower of the 21st century." Clinton has promised to implement the U.S. commitment to the Paris Agreement.

In her official 2016 presidential platform, Clinton proposes to:

- "Reduce greenhouse gas emissions by up to 30 percent in 2025 relative to 2005 levels and put the country on a path to cut emissions more than 80 percent by 2050."
- "Reduce American oil consumption by a third through cleaner fuels and more efficient cars, boilers, ships and trucks."
- "Cut energy waste in American homes, schools, hospitals and offices by a third and make American manufacturing the cleanest and most efficient in the world."
- Support the Clean Power Plan.
- "Launch a $60 billion Clean Energy Challenge to partner with states, cities, and rural communities and give them the tools and resources they need to go beyond federal standards in cutting carbon pollution and expanding clean energy."
- "End wasteful tax subsidies for oil and gas companies."
- "Cut emissions of methane, a powerful greenhouse gas, by 40-45 percent and put in place strong standards for reducing leaks from both new and existing sources."

While in the Senate, Clinton had long opposed ethanol subsidies before she introduced a bill in May 2006 to create a $50 billion fund to expand the use of ethanol and other alternative fuels. In 2007, Clinton expressed support for corn ethanol as a biofuel. In August 2015, the Clinton campaign said that she would "strengthen" the Renewable Fuel Standard to promote development of advanced biofuels and access to ethanol products.

=== Fossil fuels ===
==== Coal ====
In March 2016, Clinton said that all of Obama's executive actions on the environment should be implemented, and that coal needed to transition to natural gas, and natural gas to clean energy. She also said, "I'm the only candidate which has a policy about how to bring economic opportunity using clean renewable energy as the key into coal country. Because we're going to put a lot of coal miners and coal companies out of business, right? And we're going to make it clear that we don't want to forget those people. Those people labored in those mines for generations, losing their health, often losing their lives to turn on our lights and power our factories. Now we've got to move away from coal and all the other fossil fuels, but I don't want to move away from the people who did the best they could to produce the energy that we relied on."

When confronted about her "out of business" statement in West Virginia, Clinton stated "I don't know how to explain it other than, what I said was totally out of context for what I meant, because I have been talking about helping coal country for a very long time. It was a misstatement, because what I was saying is the way things are going now: they will continue to lose jobs. It didn't mean that we were going to do it. What I said is that is going to happen unless we take action to help and prevent it."

She had a $30 billion plan intended to revitalize coal communities and aid them in the transition away from coal. The plan called for increased job training, small-business development, infrastructure investment, and sought to safeguard miners' healthcare and pensions.

==== Fracking ====
Clinton supports allowing hydraulic fracturing (fracking) but only when it meets her conditions regarding local choice, stronger environmental regulation and chemicals. In a March 2016 debate, Clinton outlined her position as follows: "I don't support it when any locality or any state is against it, No. 1. I don't support it when the release of methane or contamination of water is present. I don't support it — No. 3 — unless we can require that anybody who fracks has to tell us exactly what chemicals they are using. So by the time we get through all of my conditions, I do not think there will be many places in America where fracking will continue to take place. And I think that's the best approach, because right now, there are places where fracking is going on that are not sufficiently regulated." According to PolitiFact, the implementation of Clinton's three conditions "would uphold existing bans and add new ones to the mix." PolitiFact notes that there are 11 states with noted cases of spills (which could be covered under her second condition) and two fracking states where there are no rules on chemical disclosure on the books (which would be covered under her third condition).

As Secretary of State, Clinton promoted fracking services by American companies to various countries, to fight climate change, boost global energy supply, and undercut "the power of adversaries that used their energy resources as a cudgel."

==== Keystone XL pipeline ====
In 2010, Clinton stated that she was inclined to support the issuance by the State Department of a permit for the Northern leg of the Keystone XL pipeline. Through June 2015, she delayed announcing her position on the pipeline, noting that as Secretary of State, she had set in motion a review process to evaluate the pipeline, and preferred to allow time for her successor John Kerry, and Obama to make the decision. In September, she announced her opposition to Keystone. The pipeline was officially rejected by Kerry and Obama in November. PolitiFact found that Clinton had not flip-flopped on the issue.

==== Dakota Access Pipeline ====
In a Los Angeles Times op-ed in September 2016, Democratic platform member Bill McKibben was critical of the disparity between the Democratic platform – which calls for recognition of the "right of all tribes to protect their lands, air, and waters" – and Clinton's silence on the issue. In October 2016, young Native American activists met outside of Clinton headquarters in Brooklyn to protest her lack of a position on continued pipeline construction and to give her a letter. In an email to Democracy now!, campaign spokesperson Tyrone Gayle said that everyone should be heard on federal infrastructure agreements, a position that Bill McKibben characterized as "say[ing] literally nothing".

=== Nuclear power ===
Clinton wants to renew permits for existing nuclear power plants that are safe to operate and increase public investment in advanced nuclear power.

In February 2007, Clinton stated, "I think nuclear power has to be part of our energy solution ... We get about 20% of our energy from nuclear power in our country ... other countries like France get much much more, so we do have to look at it because it doesn't put greenhouse gas emissions into the air." In a July 2007 Democratic debate, when asked about nuclear power as an alternative energy source, she said, "I'm agnostic about nuclear power. Until we figure out what we're going to do with the waste and the cost, it's very hard to see nuclear as a part of our future."

In Democratic debates in 2016, Clinton said that she supported greater oversight of the Indian Point nuclear power plant, which had experienced calls for closure following leaks and other problems. She said any action "needs to be done in a careful, thoughtful way" and that: "We also have to be realistic and say, 'You get 25% of the electricity in the greater New York City area from Indian Point.' I don't want middle-class taxpayers to see a huge rate increase."

=== Environment ===
Clinton accepts the scientific consensus on climate change. In a December 2014 speech to the LCV, Clinton said, "The science of climate change is unforgiving, no matter what the deniers may say" and that, "if we act decisively now, we can still head off the most catastrophic consequences." She called climate change the most consequential collection of challenges facing the United States and the world. In 2010, Clinton stated that she supports a green building fund and green-collar job training.

In 2007, Clinton and Obama co-sponsored the Climate Stewardship and Innovation Act (a greenhouse gas cap-and-trade initiative which aimed to reduce greenhouse gas emissions by 60 percent from 2000 levels by 2050) and the Global Warming Pollution Reduction Act (a more ambitious plan which sought to reduce greenhouse gas emissions by 80 percent from 2000 levels by 2050). Clinton supported the Clean Power Plan (proposed by the EPA), which would have regulated carbon emissions from power plants. She stated that "the unprecedented action that President Obama has taken must be protected at all costs."

Clinton has supported offshore oil drilling, and in 2006 voted for a bill to open new Gulf Coast areas to drilling. However, she supported the protection of the Arctic National Wildlife Refuge, and criticized the idea of drilling there. She co-sponsored the Roadless Area Conservation Act. In 2016, some environmentalists expressed concern about the millions of dollars of contributions from major fossil fuel companies accepted by the Clinton Foundation.

Clinton was endorsed by the Sierra Club in her 2000 Senate campaign. Evaluating all of her votes throughout her Senate career, the League of Conservation Voters (LCV) gave Clinton a lifetime 82 percent pro-environment action rating in 2009. The Humane Society gave Clinton scores of 100 and 83 on her actions regarding Senate legislation that would protect animals. They endorsed her in 2016 race, saying that she had a "compelling record of support for animal protection".

== Immigration policy ==
The Clinton 2016 platform proposes to:

- "Fight for comprehensive immigration reform legislation with a path to full and equal citizenship."
- "Defend President Obama's DACA and DAPA executive actions."
- Promote the naturalization of the estimated nine million lawful permanent residents in the United States who are eligible to become U.S. citizens.
- Support immigrant integration through the creation of a national Office of Immigrant Affairs, $15 million in new grant funding for integration services, and an increase in federal resources for adult English language education and citizenship education.
- Conduct more humane and targeted immigration enforcement, by detaining and deporting those individuals who pose a violent threat to public safety; ending family detention and closing private immigrant detention centers.

=== Legal rights ===
Clinton's stance on illegal immigration has softened over time. In 2003, Senator Clinton said: "We've got to do several things and I am, you know, adamantly against illegal immigrants. ... Certainly we've got to do more at our borders. And people have to stop employing illegal immigrants." However, also during her time in the Senate, Clinton cosponsored a bipartisan amnesty bill for many illegal workers in the agricultural industry; backed a bill by Senator Edward M. Kennedy that would grant permanent resident status to some illegal immigrants who had been in the country for at least five years and worked for at least two years; and supported college tuition relief for young people who had entered the county illegally. In April 2006, speaking to the U.S. Hispanic Chamber of Commerce, Clinton said her work for her New York constituents could fall afoul of the Border Protection, Anti-terrorism and Illegal Immigration Control Act of 2005, since some of her constituents are illegal immigrants. "I realize I would be a criminal, too. My staff would be criminal. We help people with all kinds of problems." In March 2006, she strongly criticized H.R. 4437, a bill passed by the House of Representatives in December 2005 and sent to the Senate, Clinton called the measure "a rebuke to what America stands for" and said it would be "an unworkable scheme to try to deport 11 million people, which you have to have a police state to try to do." She believed the solution to the illegal immigration problem was to make "a path to earned citizenship for those who are here, working hard, paying taxes, respecting the law, and willing to meet a high bar for becoming a citizen."

In May and June 2007, Clinton cast preliminary votes (in terms of amendments and cloture) in support of the high-profile, compromise-based but very controversial, comprehensive immigration reform bill known as the Secure Borders, Economic Opportunity and Immigration Reform Act of 2007. When the bill was again brought forward, she continued to vote in favor of cloture motions to consider it. In October 2007, Clinton voted in favor of a small subset of the previous bill, the DREAM Act.

In 2007, Clinton called for an increase in the number of H-1B visas.

At a debate at Drexel University in Philadelphia on October 30, 2007, Clinton committed to support of New York Governor Eliot Spitzer's plan to give driver's licenses to illegal immigrants. Two minutes later, she recanted the position and blamed the Bush administration for not passing immigration reform. The following day, she clarified her position in a prepared statement by coming out in support of Spitzer's bill. Two weeks later, after Spitzer abandoned the plan due to widespread opposition, Clinton reversed her position on the issue once again, stating: "I support Governor Spitzer's decision today to withdraw his proposal. As president, I will not support driver's licenses for undocumented people and will press for comprehensive immigration reform that deals with all of the issues around illegal immigration, including border security and fixing our broken system." On November 16, when asked again if she supported granting driver's licenses to undocumented immigrants, she gave a one-word answer: "No."

In 2008, Clinton received a rating of "D−" from Americans for Better Immigration, an anti-immigration organization.

In 2014, Clinton stated that children from Central America who entered the United States illegally "should be sent back as soon as it can be determined who responsible adults in their families are, because there are concerns whether all of them should be sent back. But I think all of them who can be should be reunited with their families." She added: "We have to send a clear message. Just because your child gets across the border, that doesn't mean the child gets to stay. We don't want to send a message that is contrary to our laws or will encourage more children to make that dangerous journey."

In May 2015, Clinton stated that allowing illegal immigrants to have a path to citizenship "is at its heart a family issue." Clinton also "sharply criticized Republican presidential candidates who favor granting legal status for some undocumented immigrants, but oppose citizenship," saying: "When they talk about 'legal status,' that is code for 'second-class status.'" Clinton said that she supported President Obama's Deferred Action for Childhood Arrivals program, which grants undocumented youth (those who entered the U.S. as children) the chance to apply for a stay of deportation.

In 2015, Clinton said that she wanted the United States to accept 65,000 Syrian refugees, a significant increase to the 10,000 that the Obama administration pledged to accept.

In 2016, Clinton expressed support for Obama's Deferred Action for Parental Accountability (DAPA) program, which would allow up to five million undocumented immigrants to gain deferral of deportation and authorization to legally work in the United States, and she promised to expand it.

=== Border barrier ===
In September 2006, Clinton voted for the Secure Fence Act, authorizing the construction of 700 miles (1,100 km) of fencing along the United States–Mexico border. In 2015, Clinton said, "I voted numerous times when I was a senator to spend money to build a barrier to try to prevent illegal immigrants from coming in. And I do think you have to control your borders".

== Foreign and defense policy ==
=== Africa ===
==== Libya ====
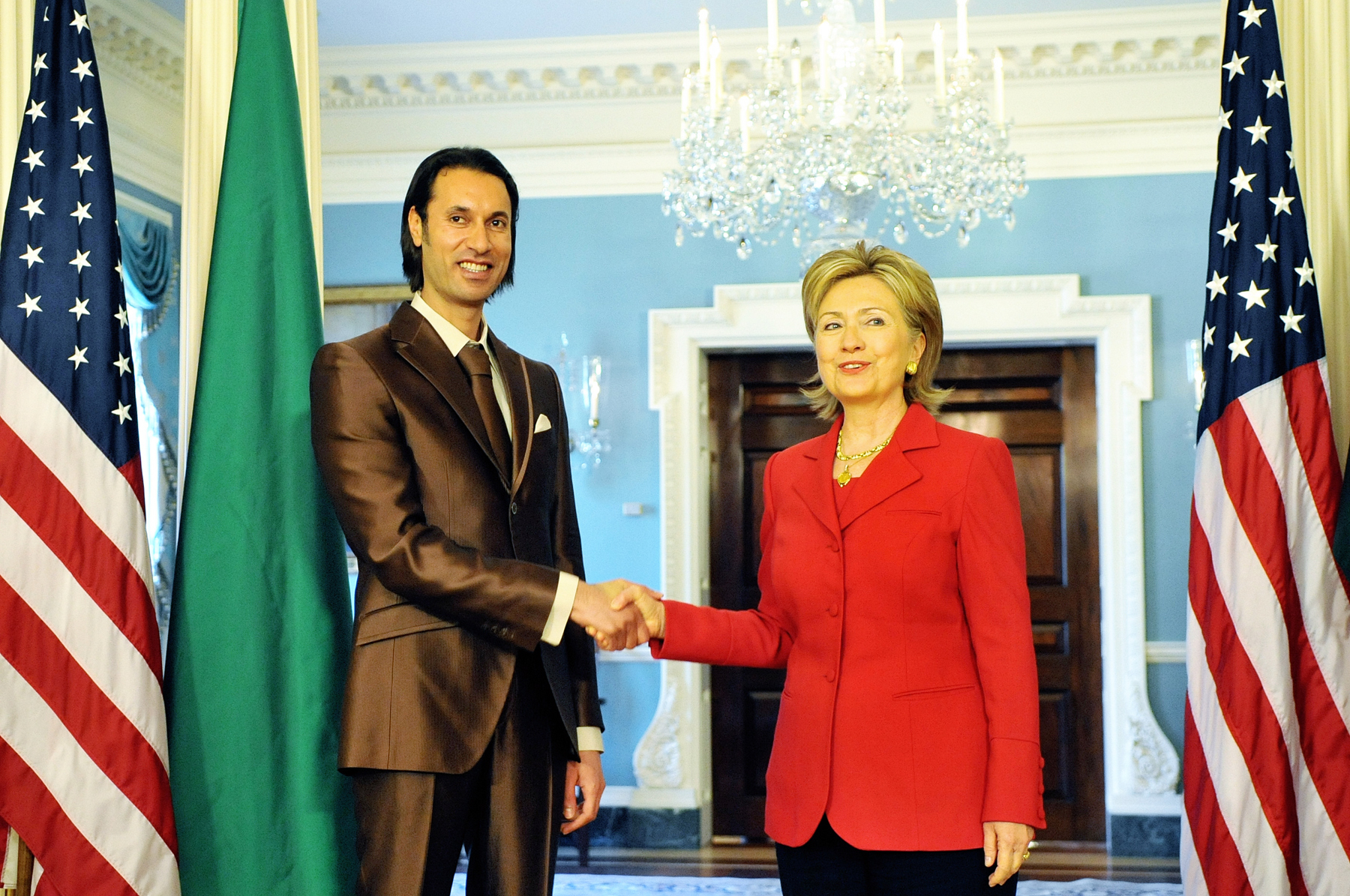
Clinton with Mutassim Gaddafi, the National Security Advisor of Libya. As Secretary of State, Clinton reportedly played a key role in promoting American military intervention against his father during the Libyan Civil War.

Clinton reportedly played a key role in persuading Obama to militarily intervene in Libya during the Libyan Civil War, and deemed it worthwhile to intervene due to fears of further atrocities by Libyan dictator Muammar Gaddafi; calls to action from Britain, France, and the Arab League; and a belief that the Libyan opposition could govern in the aftermath of an intervention. After the conclusion of the Libyan Civil War and the demise of Gaddafi, there remained factional violence in Libya until it erupted into renewed civil war in 2014. Terrorist groups have taken refuge in Libya, and large numbers of refugees have fled to neighboring countries and across the Mediterranean. When asked to defend her record on Libya, Clinton called it "a classic case of a hard choice" and found that the overthrow of Gaddafi represented "smart power at its best." When told of news reports of Qaddafi's death by an aide in between formal interviews, Clinton laughed and replied with "We came, we saw, he died".

Clinton has said that history's judgment on the intervention, and her role in it, are not yet final. In November 2015, she said to the Council on Foreign Relations that "the Libyan people have voted twice in free and fair elections for the kind of leadership they want. They have not been able to figure out how to prevent the disruptions that they are confronted with because of internal divides and because of some of the external pressures that are coming from terrorist groups and others. So I think it's too soon to tell. And I think it's something that we have to be, you know, looking at very closely."

=== Asia ===
==== East Asia ====
===== China =====
Clinton described the U.S.-China relationship in Hard Choices as one that does not fit "neatly into categories like friend or rival". According to the Council on Foreign Relations, "Clinton was a central actor in the Obama administration's strategic 'pivot' to Asia" during her tenure as Secretary of State. She has criticized China for its cyberattacks and industrial espionage against the U.S., and for behaving in threatening ways towards U.S. allies such as the Philippines.

Clinton stated in 2010 that competing maritime claims in the South China Sea were a U.S. national interest: "The United States has a national interest in freedom of navigation, open access to Asia's maritime commons and respect for international law in the South China Sea." The Chinese foreign minister responded, saying that "remarks were in effect an attack on China".

Clinton has repeatedly criticized the Chinese government's human rights record. In 2011, for example, she described the Chinese government's human rights record as "deplorable" and its crackdown on dissent as "a fool's errand." Clinton has criticized Chinese leader Xi Jinping's record on gender inequality, accusing the Chinese regime of "persecuting feminists," referring to the detention of five Chinese women activists (Wei Tingting and four others) who had campaigned against sexual harassment. As First Lady, she criticized China's one-child policy. She has been criticized by Chinese state media and "government-affiliated opinion writers," as well as by Chinese social media commentators, for her forceful human rights critiques and her opposition to China's activities in the South China Sea. In 2008, she called on President Bush to boycott the opening ceremony of the Beijing Olympics, citing political violence in Tibet and China's failure to pressure Sudan to halt the violence in Darfur. As Secretary of State, Clinton warned against "new colonialism" in Africa, referring to China's involvement in Africa. On a trip to Africa in 2011, Clinton said that China was not a role model for governance. In a trip to Africa the following year, Clinton launched the trip by contrasting the U.S. commitment to "democracy and human rights" with rival powers' desire "to look the other way and keep the resources flowing"—a comment that was widely interpreted as a veiled attack on China.

===== North Korea =====
Clinton says that she wants to increase sanctions on North Korea to curtail its nuclear weapons program, urge China to put pressure on North Korea to curtail its nuclear weapons program, and bolster the ballistic missile shield with allies Japan and South Korea. She supported the Obama administration's pivot to Asia, in part because the United States needed a greater military presence in the region to counter the North Korean threat.

==== South Asia ====
===== Afghanistan =====
Clinton supports President Barack Obama's decision to keep 5,500 U.S. troops in Afghanistan through the end of his term in January 2017. She has said that the primary goal of these forces should be to support and train the Afghan National Army rather than to engage in "on-the-ground combat." When asked in June 2014 about U.S. withdrawal from Afghanistan, Clinton said that it would depend upon "conditions on the ground and what was being asked for."

As Secretary of State under Obama, Clinton advocated more hawkish policies than other senior administration officials; "Clinton's more activist philosophy" occasionally clashed with Obama's "instincts toward restraint." Clinton supported the 2009 increase in U.S. troop levels in Afghanistan. During the administration's Afghanistan War review in 2010, Clinton endorsed General Stanley McChrystal's recommendation for 40,000 more troops to Afghanistan, before endorsing a fallback proposal (ultimately accepted by Obama) for 30,000 troops.

In January 2010, Clinton supported a $500 million plan developed by NATO, Britain, and the Afghan government to reintegrate low-level Taliban insurgents into Afghan society. The plan, to be funded by a "Peace and Reintegration Trust Fund," Clinton set three end conditions for any reintegration of insurgents: the renunciation of violence, a break with al-Qaeda, and a commitment to abide by Afghan law, including an Afghan Constitution guaranteeing "the rights of all individuals, especially women." Mary Akrami of the Afghan Women Skills Development Center, were "initially dubious" of the plan, given the Taliban's record of threatening and attacking girls and women. Marc Grossman (who served as U.S. Special Representative for Afghanistan and Pakistan at the time) stated that "the moral ambiguity of talking to insurgents was clarified by our commitment to the principles Secretary Clinton had laid out before we started to talk."

U.S.-Taliban talks lasted from mid-2011 to March 2012 and were ultimately unsuccessful. In October 2011, Clinton said that a door for a negotiated peace as part of an inclusive political process was still open to the Taliban, and that the Taliban would face "unrelenting" attacks if they refused. Clinton also said at the time that Pakistani cooperation was vital to Afghan security and urged the Pakistani government "to deny safe haven to extremists sheltering across the border." Clinton stated in her memoir Hard Choices: "I acknowledged, as I had many times before, that opening the door to negotiations with the Taliban would be hard to swallow for many Americans after so many years before. Reintegrating low-level fighters was odious enough; negotiating directly with top commanders was something else entirely. But diplomacy would be easy if we had to talk only to our friends. That's not how peace is made."

During internal U.S. government talks in 2011–12, Clinton was highly skeptical of the exchange of five Taliban detainees for U.S. Army Sgt. Bowe Bergdahl. Clinton pushed for stricter conditions as part of any agreement and was "disinclined to trust the Taliban or the Haqqani network in Pakistan," which held Bergdahl prisoner.

==== Southeast Asia ====
===== Burma =====
Clinton has described Burma's transition to democracy as "a high point of my time as Secretary." While noting that obstacles toward full democracy remain, Clinton emphasized her role in nudging the nation toward political reform. Clinton praised the landmark free elections held in Burma in 2015, calling them "an important, though imperfect, step forward in the country's long journey toward democracy" and saying that they represented "an affirmation of the indispensable role the United States can and should play in the world as a champion of peace and progress."

==== West Asia ====
===== Iran =====
Clinton has described Iran as a long-term strategic challenge to the United States, its NATO allies, and Israel. In 2006, she called for sanctions to deter Iran from obtaining nuclear weapons and refused to rule out a military strike, saying: "We cannot take any option off the table in sending a clear message to Iran that they will not be permitted to acquire nuclear weapons." In 2007, she accused Iran of state-sponsored terrorism and using its surrogates to supply explosives that kill U.S. troops in Iraq. She criticized the Bush administration for refusing to talk to Iran about its nuclear program; meanwhile, Iran allegedly enhanced its nuclear-enrichment capabilities. In September 2007, she voted for a symbolic non-binding amendment to label Iran's Islamic Revolutionary Guard Corps as a "foreign terrorist organization," and to use diplomatic economic, intelligence economic, and U.S. military "instruments" to enforce U.S. policy against Iran and "its proxies" within Iraq. Clinton insisted that she continued to support vigorous diplomacy with Iran, defending her vote by saying Iranian arms shipments to Iraq have slowed down since the Senate resolution passed. But her Democratic opponents criticized her for contributing to what they said was Bush administration saber rattling on Iran. In October 2007, Clinton cosponsored a bill prohibiting the use of funds for military action in Iran without "explicit Congressional authorization." In April 2008, Clinton threatened Iran with nuclear annihilation if they attacked Israel with nuclear weapons, saying "If Iran were to launch a nuclear attack on Israel what would our response be? I want the Iranians to know that if I'm the president, we will attack Iran. That's what we will do. There is no safe haven." She continued, "Whatever stage of development they might be in their nuclear weapons program in the next 10 years during which they may foolishly consider launching an attack on Israel, we would be able to totally obliterate them."

During Clinton's tenure as Secretary of State, "upping sanctions on Iran was a clear priority." Clinton was personally involved in the U.S. State Department's successful efforts to convince other nations, including Russia and China, to rapidly ramp up international sanctions against Iran. Clinton also successfully secured the passage of United Nations Security Council Resolution 1929 in June 2010, which added strict new sanctions on Iran, including an arms embargo and limits on the country's financial and shipping activities. The sanctions imposed on Iran by the U.S. during Clinton's tenure are generally regarded as one of several factors that compelled Iran to go to the negotiating table over its nuclear program.

According to experts, "Clinton's team also played a role in the sanctions that Congress passed" during Clinton's tenure, although "Congress did pass some sanctions that went further than the administration's wishes." One such measure, placing sanctions on the Iran's central bank, was enacted by Congress and signed into law by President Obama over the objections of State Department officials. The State Department ultimately implemented it, although it issued waivers from the sanctions for several countries, prompting criticism from some lawmakers and advocacy groups.

During her 2008 election campaign, Clinton criticized Obama for being willing to negotiate with Iran without preconditions. As Secretary of State, Clinton helped arrange secret lower-level talks with the nation in 2012 and in 2013. After resigning as Secretary of State, she stated that negotiations were the most likely way for the U.S. to influence the country's nuclear development.

In April 2015, Clinton confirmed her support for an agreement to lift economic sanctions on Iran in exchange for limits on the country's nuclear program, calling it "an important step" in controlling the nation's security. In January 2016, Clinton said, "I'm very proud of the Iran Nuclear Agreement. I was very pleased to be part of what the president put into action when he took office. I was responsible for getting those sanctions imposed which put the pressure on Iran. It brought them to the negotiating table which resulted in this agreement. But I think we still have to carefully watch them."

===== Iraq =====
In October 2002, Clinton voted in favor of the Authorization for Use of Military Force Against Iraq, commonly known as the Iraq War Resolution, to give President Bush authority for the Iraq War. In an interview on December 18, 2006, she expressed regret for the vote: "Obviously, if we knew then what we know now, there wouldn't have been a vote, and I certainly wouldn't have voted for it." By February 2007, Clinton failed to state that her vote was a mistake, or to apologize for it, as anti-war Democrats demanded. "If the most important thing to any of you is choosing someone who did not cast that vote or has said this vote was a mistake, then there are others to choose from," Clinton told an audience in Dover, New Hampshire.

In a 2008 Democratic debate, Clinton said that she voted for the resolution under the impression that Bush would allow more time for UN inspectors to find proof of weapons of mass destruction before proceeding. Reporter Carl Bernstein and others have questioned why Clinton would have voted against the Levin Amendment, which would have required President Bush to allow more time to UN weapons inspectors and also would have required a separate Congressional authorization to allow a unilateral invasion of Iraq, if her vote was simply a vote for strong diplomacy.

During an April 2004 interview on Larry King Live, Clinton was asked about her October 2002 vote in favor of the Iraq war resolution.

Obviously, I've thought about that a lot in the months since. No, I don't regret giving the president authority because at the time it was in the context of weapons of mass destruction, grave threats to the United States, and clearly, Saddam Hussein had been a real problem for the international community for more than a decade. ... The consensus was the same, from the Clinton administration to the Bush administration. It was the same intelligence belief that our allies and friends around the world shared.

But, she said, the Bush Administration "really believed it. They really thought they were right, but they didn't let enough sunlight into their thinking process to really have the kind of debate that needs to take place when a serious decision occurs like that."

In a November 29, 2005 letter to her constituents, Senator Clinton said, "There are no quick and easy solutions to the long and drawn out conflict [the Bush] Administration triggered ... I do not believe that we should allow this to be an open-ended commitment without limits or end. Nor do I believe that we can or should pull out of Iraq immediately."

On June 8, 2006, Clinton said of the U.S. airstrike that killed Abu Musab al-Zarqawi: "I saw firsthand the terrible consequences of Zarqawi's terrorist network when Bill, Chelsea and I visited the hotel ballroom in Amman, Jordan last November where Zarqawi's followers had detonated a bomb at a wedding, killing and wounding innocent people. We owe our thanks to our men and women in uniform and others in Iraq who have been fighting Zarqawi and other insurgents and who are responsible for today's success." In a speech on June 13, she sharply criticized Bush's handling of the Iraq War, saying that he "rushed to war" and "refused to let the UN inspectors conduct and complete their mission ... We need to be building alliances instead of isolation around the world ... There must be a plan that will begin to bring our troops home." In the same speech, Clinton reiterated her longstanding opposition to a timeline for U.S. withdrawal, saying: "I do not think it is a smart strategy either for the president to continue with his open-ended commitment which I think does not put enough pressure on the Iraqi government, nor do I think it is a smart policy to set a date certain."

In February 2007, she announced the Iraq Troop Protection and Reduction Act of 2007. This act would compel President Bush to begin relegating troops from Iraq within 90 days of remote passage, or, according to Clinton, Congress would have to dismantle their authorization for the war. The Act would also end the blank check to the Iraqi government and submit them to harsh consequences if boundaries are violated. Lastly, the Act would require the Secretary of Defense to verify the condition, in terms of supplies and in terms of their training, of all Iraqi troops before they are sent.

In March 2007 she voted in favor of a war spending bill that required President Bush to begin withdrawing troops from Iraq within a certain deadline; it passed almost completely along party lines but was subsequently vetoed by President Bush.

In May 2007, Clinton, along with then democratic rival Obama and 12 other senators, voted against a compromise war funding bill that removed previously vetoed withdrawal deadlines but tied funding to progress benchmarks for the Iraqi government. She said, "I fully support our troops [but this measure] fails to compel the president to give our troops a new strategy in Iraq."

While calling for ending the war in Iraq, Clinton's indicated in July 2007 that she advocates keeping a reduced number of U.S. troops in Iraq for the foreseeable future, stating "we cannot lose sight of our very real strategic national interests in this region." In the speech, she posited redeploying U.S. forces to protect the Kurdish region in the north, to engage in targeted operations against al-Qaeda in Iraq, and to train and equip Iraqi forces. Clinton's position is similar to that of the Iraq Study Group in that she highlights the need for political reconciliation in Iraq, supports the withdrawal of U.S. combat brigades, and favors keeping a reduced number of troops to serve in training and support roles such as protection of the U.S. Embassy.

In August 2007, Clinton credited the troop surge and related new tactics with helping to produce the Anbar Awakening in Al Anbar Governorate, but said that overall the increase in troops had not met stated goals: "The surge was designed to give the Iraqi government time to take steps to ensure a political solution to the situation. It has failed to do so. The White House's report in September wont change that. It is abundantly clear that there is no military solution to the sectarian fighting in Iraq. We need to stop refereeing the war, and start getting out now." Furthermore, Clinton, following the lead of Senate Armed Services Committee chair Carl Levin, called on the Iraqi Parliament to replace Nouri al-Maliki as Prime Minister of Iraq with "a less divisive and more unifying figure," saying that Maliki had failed to make progress in bridging differences between the hostile factions within Iraq: "Iraqi leaders have not met their own political benchmarks to share power, modify the de-Baathification laws, pass an oil law, schedule provincial elections, and amend their constitution."

By late November 2007, with still more evidence that the surge and other tactics and developments had led to a significant lessening of the civil violence in Iraq, Clinton acknowledged the successes but said that the underlying equation had not changed: "Our troops are the best in the world; if you increase their numbers they are going to make a difference. The fundamental point here is that the purpose of the surge was to create space for political reconciliation and that has not happened, and there is no indication that it is going to happen, or that the Iraqis will meet the political benchmarks. We need to stop refereeing their civil war and start getting out of it."

At the January 16, 2008 Democratic debate, Clinton, along with Senators Barack Obama and John Edwards, maintained that they cannot guarantee the removal of all U.S. troops by the end of their first presidential term due to continuing support roles. All three pledged to begin the withdrawal of combat brigades within 60 days of taking office. Additionally, Clinton used the opportunity to ask Senator Obama to co-sponsor legislation to prevent President Bush from signing long-term agreements with the government of Iraq without the express consent of congress, stating: "So I've introduced legislation that clearly requires President Bush to come to the United States Congress. It is not enough, as he claims, to go to the Iraqi parliament, but to come to the United States Congress to get anything that he's trying to do, including permanent bases, numbers of troops, all the other commitments he's talking about as he's traveling in that region."

===== Israel =====
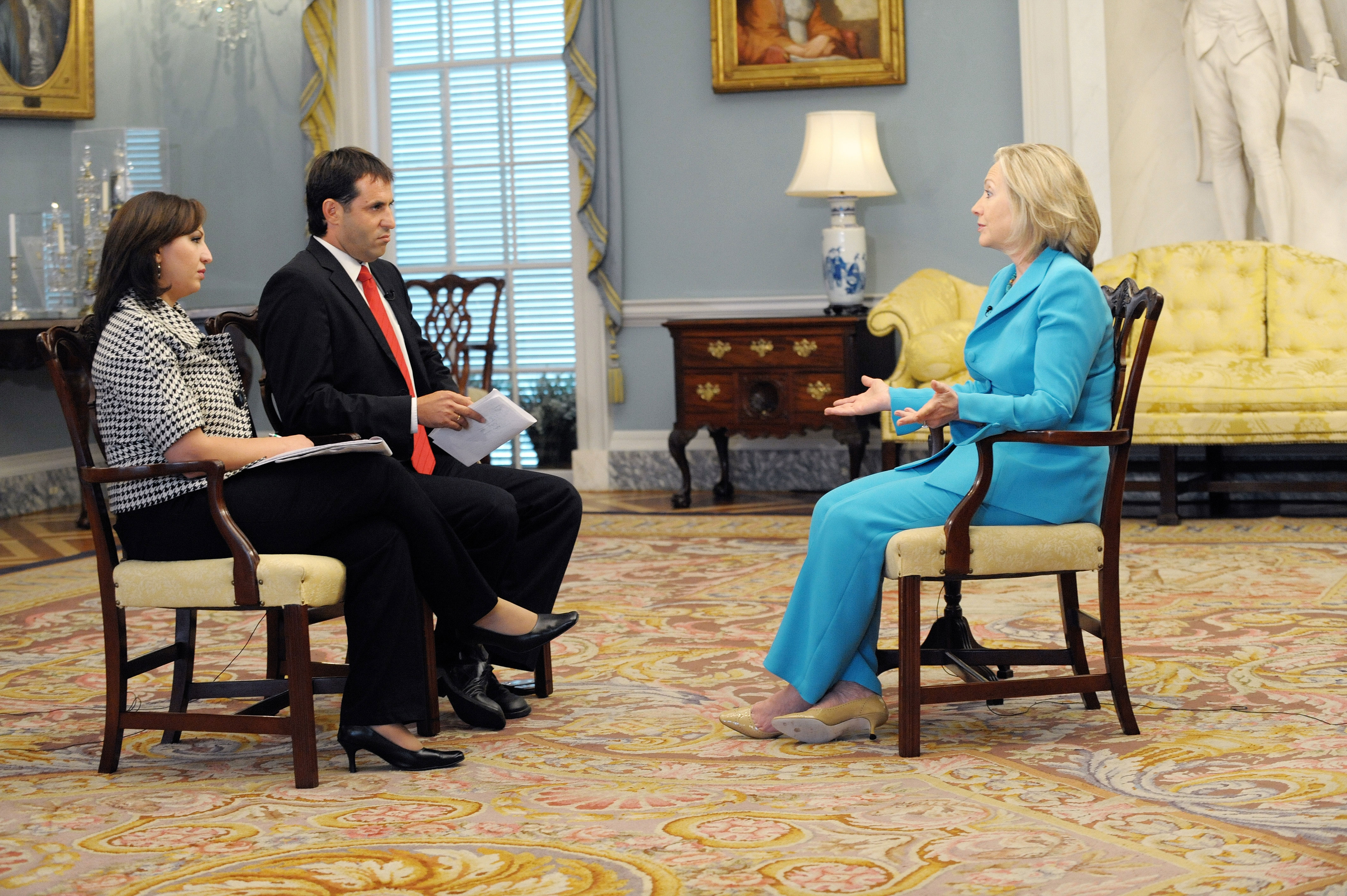
Clinton in a joint TV interview with Israeli journalist Udi Segal and Palestinian journalist Amirah Rishmawi in September 2010

Clinton has stated that she is "an emphatic, unwavering supporter of Israel's safety and security." CNN noted in 2016 that Clinton "has a long and detailed track record on supporting Israel in efforts to find a two-state solution throughout her time in the Senate and as secretary of state." In her speech to the 2016 AIPAC conference, Clinton reaffirmed her longstanding support for a negotiated two-state solution as "the only way to guarantee Israel's long-term survival as a strong Jewish and democratic state." In 1998, Clinton said that such an arrangement would "be in the long-term interests of the Middle East."

In 2010, as secretary of state, Clinton presided over three sessions of direct face-to-face talks between Israeli Prime Minister Benjamin Netanyahu and Palestinian National Authority President Mahmoud Abbas. In her 2016 AIPAC speech, Clinton said that if elected president she would continue to pursue direct Israel-Palestinian negotiations but would "vigorously oppose any attempt by outside parties to impose a solution, including by the U.N. Security Council."

Clinton has condemned the Boycott, Divestment and Sanctions (BDS) movement and "all efforts to malign, isolate and undermine Israel and the Jewish people." Clinton is opposed to Israeli settlement expansion, arguing that a settlement freeze is key for peace talks to succeed.

In November 2005, Clinton said that she supports the creation of the West Bank barrier, stating: "This is not against the Palestinian people. This is against the terrorists." In July 2006, Clinton expressed support for Israel's efforts in the 2006 Israel-Lebanon conflict: "We are here to show solidarity and support for Israel. We will stand with Israel, because Israel is standing for American values as well as Israeli ones." In 2007 she spoke before an American Israel Public Affairs Committee (AIPAC) audience in New York and declared that "Israel is a beacon of what's right in a neighborhood overshadowed by the wrongs of radicalism, extremism, despotism and terrorism." During her presidential campaign for the 2016 election she expressed strong support for Israel. She penned a letter where she praised the country as a "a vibrant democracy". She also pledged to "deepen America's unshakeable commitment to Israel's security, including our long standing tradition of guaranteeing Israel's qualitative military edge".

As a senator and throughout her career, Clinton has said that she regards Jerusalem as the "eternal and indivisible capital of Israel," and Clinton supported legislation requiring the U.S. government to identify Jerusalem as the capital of Israel and move the U.S. Embassy to Israel from Tel Aviv to Jerusalem (the Jerusalem Embassy Act). In 2011, as Secretary of State, Clinton filed a brief with the U.S. Supreme Court in the case of Zivotofsky v. Clinton, involving an act of Congress requiring that U.S. passports for persons born in Jerusalem read "Jerusalem, Israel" (rather than "Jerusalem") under place of birth. Consistent with the U.S.'s policy of the last 60 years recognizing no state as having sovereignty over Jerusalem, Clinton's brief argued that "any American action, even symbolically, toward recognizing Jerusalem as the capital of Israel" might have an influence on the Israeli-Palestinian peace process. The Supreme Court subsequently struck down the passport law on separation-of-powers grounds, holding that Congress had intruded upon the president's constitutional power to recognize foreign states.

While the 2014 Gaza war was ongoing, Clinton said in an interview that Hamas had intentionally provoked Israel by firing rockets into the country. In regard to whether Israel's response against Hamas had been proportionate, she said, "I'm not a military planner, but Hamas puts its missiles – its rockets – in civilian areas. Part of it is that Gaza's pretty small and it's very densely populated. They put their command and control of Hamas military leaders in those civilian areas. Israel, I know, has sent warnings and tried to get people to move, but in any kind of conflict there are going to be civilian casualties, and we need to try to get to a cease-fire as soon as possible."

At the 2025 Israel Hayom summit in New York City, Clinton argued that young people's pro-Palestinian views were due to social media, and claimed that videos on TikTok showing Israeli violence in Gaza were "totally made up" and "pure propaganda", adding that it was "a serious problem for democracy". She repeated her remarks at the Doha Forum in Qatar. Clinton's comments received criticism, including from journalist Robby Soave.

===== Turkey =====
During the 2016 Turkish coup d'état attempt, Clinton said: "We should all urge calm and respect for laws, institutions, and basic human rights and freedoms - and support for the democratically elected civilian government."

====== Armenian Genocide ======
During her time in the Senate, Clinton was a co-sponsor of the Armenian Genocide Resolution, and as senator twice wrote to President Bush, calling on him to refer to the Armenian genocide in his annual commemorative statement. (The use of the word "genocide" is contested by the government of Turkey.) In 2008, during her presidential run, she stated that "I believe the horrible events perpetrated by the Ottoman Empire against Armenians constitute a clear case of genocide."

As secretary of state under Obama, Clinton shifted her position on the atrocity; consistent with administration policy, neither Clinton nor the Department of State used the word genocide, which angered Armenians and the Armenian National Committee of America. At a State Department event in January 2012, Clinton stated that the atrocity "has always been viewed, and I think properly so, as a matter of historical debate" causing "high emotions" and "that is the right posture for the United States Government" to avoid using the word.

After leaving office as secretary of state, Clinton resumed using the term genocide. A Clinton aide told Newsweek in April 2015 that Clinton "has a record of expressing her own view that this was a genocide."

=== Europe ===
==== Russia and Ukraine ====
Clinton discussing the New START treaty at a March 2010 press conference

As secretary of state, Clinton oversaw the completion of the New START nuclear arms control treaty between the United States and Russia, and successfully pushed for its ratification. In April 2016, the Clinton campaign ran an advertisement claiming credit for Clinton in "securing a massive reduction in nuclear weapons" through the treaty. FactCheck.org found that this ad overstated Clinton's nuclear achievement, noting that New START limits the number of deployed strategic nuclear warheads but does not require either side to destroy nuclear weapons or reduce their nuclear stockpile, that Russia was below the limit when the treaty took effect, and that the country has increased them since then.

The New START treaty was part of Clinton's broader role in the 2009 "reset" of U.S.-Russia relations. Clinton defended the "reset" in 2014, saying that the signing of the New START treaty, enhanced sanctions on Iran and the securing of supply lines to American troops in Afghanistan were all successes that came from the reset.

In an interview with a Russian journalist in 2010, Clinton stated "One of the fears that I hear from Russians is that somehow the United States wants Russia to be weak. That could not be farther from the truth. Our goal is to help strengthen Russia. We see Russia with the strong culture, with the incredible intellectual capital that Russia has, as a leader in the 21st century. And we sometimes feel like we believe more in your future than sometimes Russians do." After Russia's 2011 elections, Clinton said that they were "neither free nor fair", a statement that was consistent with claims by elections observers and the statements by other Western leaders.

Clinton has criticized Russian president Vladimir Putin on a number of occasions for his aggressive conduct, particularly after Russia annexed Crimea and supported separatists in eastern Ukraine, which led to ongoing increased tensions with the West. In July 2014, Clinton said that Putin "can be dangerous" and that "his latest aggression in Ukraine must be answered with a joint reaction by the West." In January 2015, Clinton called for increased financial aid, military equipment, and military training to Ukraine (contingent on measures to ensure accountability) to "help Ukraine defend its borders" and combat Russian-backed separatists.

=== North America ===
==== Cuba ====
Clinton supported the Helms–Burton Act of 1996. In 2000, Clinton stated that she supported increasing food and medicine exports to Cuba and allowing more travel to the Cuba, but was "not ready to vote to lift" the U.S. embargo against Cuba, insisting that "Castro should make some good faith show of moving toward ending repression, freeing political prisoners and some steps toward democratization" before the U.S. acted to lift the embargo. Clinton held the same view for the same reasons in 2008.

Clinton later shifted her view, writing in her 2014 book Hard Choices that near the end of her tenure as Secretary of State, she recommended that Obama review the Cuban embargo, as it was not achieving its goals and might have been counterproductive. Clinton wrote that the embargo was "holding back our broader agenda across Latin America" and that "After 20 years of observing and dealing with the U.S.-Cuba relationship, I thought we should shift the onus onto the Castros to explain why they remained undemocratic and abusive."

In December 2014, after expressed her support for lifting the embargo, after President Obama announced that the administration would be taking steps to do so. Clinton said in a speech to the Council on Foreign Relations in 2014 that the embargo was "Castro's best friend," and the following year stated that "Despite good intentions, our decades-long policy of isolation has only strengthened the Castro regime's grip on power. As I have said, the best way to bring change to Cuba is to expose its people to the values, information, and material comforts of the outside world. The goal of increased U.S. engagement in the days and years ahead should be to encourage real and lasting reforms for the Cuban people."

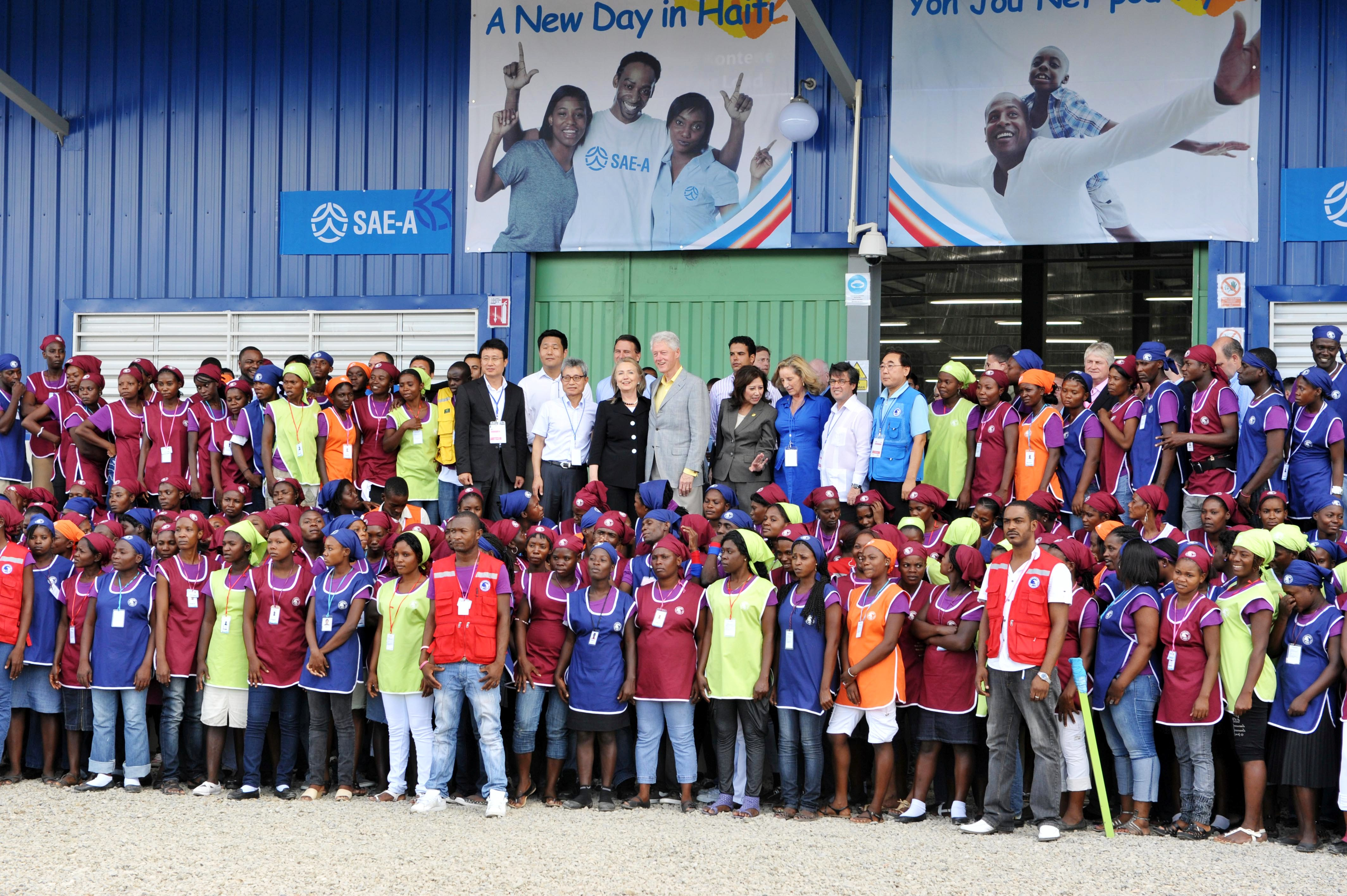
Bill and Hillary Clinton at Caracol Industrial Park in Haiti in 2012

==== Haiti ====
The Clinton Foundation has been involved in channeling significant financial aid to Haiti both before and after the 2010 Haiti earthquake, leading both Bill and Hillary Clinton to become active supporters of Haitian politicians with mixed results. The Clinton Foundation's role in the creation of the Caracol Industrial Park has been the source of significant criticism.

==== Honduras ====
Greg Grandin and some other commentators have criticized Clinton for legitimizing the military-backed ouster of President Manuel Zelaya in the 2009 Honduran coup d'état, which occurred amidst a constitutional crisis in that country. Grandin also faulted Clinton for supporting what he characterized as neoliberal economic policies such as privatization in Mexico, El Salvador, and elsewhere in Latin America.

In 2016, when asked about events in Honduras, Clinton took the position that the removal of President Zelaya was legal, although "I didn't like the way it looked or the way they did it." Clinton noted that if the U.S. government had declared a coup, it would have been legally obliged to immediately cut off all aid, including humanitarian aid, which would "just make the situation worse by punishing the Honduran people." Clinton noted that she had worked with Nobel Peace Prize laureate Óscar Arias to navigate "a very difficult situation, without bloodshed, without a civil war, that led to a new election" and stated: "I think that was better for the Honduran people. But we have a lot of work to do to try to help stabilize that and deal with corruption, deal with the violence and the gangs and so much else."

=== South America ===
==== Brazil ====
In 2010, Clinton criticized the Brazilian government (then led by President Luiz Inácio Lula da Silva) and the Turkish government (led by President Recep Tayyip Erdoğan) for making a fuel-swap agreement with Iran. Clinton stated that the agreement had a "number of deficiencies" and was a "transparent ploy" by Iran.

Clinton visited Brasília in 2012, leading the U.S. delegation to the third U.S.-Brazil Global Partnership Dialogue. and giving opening remarks with Brazilian President Dilma Rousseff at the First Annual High-Level Meeting of the Open Government Partnership (OGP), an international initiative (co-chaired by Brazil and the United States and including many countries and civil society organizations) that is aimed at fighting corruption. On the occasion, Clinton praised Rousseff for her "commitment to openness, transparency, her fight against corruption"; Rousseff was at the time known as a champion of anti-corruption efforts, although years later (in 2016), Rousseff was impeached on allegations of impropriety.

==== Venezuela ====
As secretary of state, Clinton frequently criticized controversial Venezuelan President Hugo Chávez and his government, saying that the U.S. was open to improving relations with the country but that "it doesn't appear that he wants to." In 2010, Chávez said in a speech: "I'm not loved by Hillary Clinton ... and I don't love her either." Clinton described Chávez as "a self-aggrandizing dictator who was more of an aggravation than a real threat" in her book Hard Choices.

=== Counterterrorism and homeland security ===
==== Syria, Iraq and fight against ISIL ====
Clinton has proposed intensifying the current air campaign against ISIL's strongholds in Iraq and Syria. She says she will step up support for local forces on the ground. In 2014, Clinton advocated for arming the moderate rebels in the Syrian Civil War, saying that "the failure to help build up a credible fighting force of the people who were the originators of the protests against Assad ... left a big vacuum, which the jihadists have now filled." She wants to pursue "a diplomatic strategy to resolve Syria's civil war and Iraq's sectarian conflict". She is opposed to putting combat troops on the ground in Syria or Iraq, but does support an expanded deployment of U.S. special operations troops on the ground to assist local forces.

On the American-led military actions against ISIL in Syria, Clinton advocates going further than what President Obama has done in terms of the air campaign and support for local forces. Clinton has also proposed a no-fly zone in northern Syria, enforced by the U.S. and allies, that would provide a humanitarian buffer zone (or "safe haven") that would protect civilians fleeing the Assad regime and ISIL. Clinton has also called upon the Arab states of the Persian Gulf to stop funding terrorist groups, saying: "Once and for all, the Saudis, the Qataris and others need to stop their citizens from directly funding extremist organizations."

At the beginning of his administration, President Obama sought to improve relations with Syria. He returned the U.S. ambassador to the country (who had been withdrawn by the Bush administration following the assassination of the Lebanese prime minister) and a number of congressional delegations visited the country. Appearing on Face the Nation on March 27, 2011, Secretary of State Clinton said "There's a different leader in Syria now. Many of the members of Congress of both parties who have gone to Syria in recent months have said they believe he's a reformer." After members of Congress and the media criticized her statement, she said "I referenced opinions of others. That was not speaking either for myself or for the administration." A Washington Post invstgiation found no evidence that any Republicans has made statements to support Clinton's statement and concluded: "In fact, Clinton's remarks gave a highly misleading impression—that there was general consensus by experts on Syria in both parties that Assad was a reformer, even though Clinton's own State Department reports label him otherwise."

Following the 2016 Brussels bombings, Clinton said: "We need to work with the brightest minds of Silicon Valley to more effectively track and analyze ISIS' social media and map jihadists' networks online."

==== Criticism of the Arab Gulf states for terrorist funding ====
Clinton criticized several Arab states of the Persian Gulf in June 2016 for their funding of terrorism, saying: "It is long past time for the Saudis, the Qataris and the Kuwaitis and others to stop their citizens from funding extremist organizations. And they should stop supporting radical schools and mosques around the world that have set too many young people on a path toward extremism." The Associated Press describes her rhetoric as "a window into how a President Clinton might approach the combustible, complex Middle East: polite but harsh truth-telling, with specifics, delivered as if among friends." It was reported in 2010 that Clinton in leaked diplomatic cables described donors in Saudi Arabia as the "most significant source of funding to Sunni terrorist groups worldwide".

==== Homeland security ====
In December 2004, regarding the passage of the Intelligence Reform and Terrorism Prevention Act (IRTPA), Senator Clinton delivered remarks on her approach to homeland security. "[This] legislation calls for dramatic improvements in the security of our nation's transportation infrastructure, including aviation security, air cargo security, and port security. Through this legislation, the security of the Northern Border will also be improved, a goal I have worked toward since 2001. Among many key provisions, the legislation calls for an increase of at least 10,000 border patrol agents from Fiscal Years 2006 through 2010, many of whom will be dedicated specifically to our Northern Border. There will also be an increase of at least 4,000 full-time immigration and customs enforcement officers in the next five years.

Later in the speech, Clinton described her satisfaction with the way in which IRTPA tackles what she views as the root causes of terrorism by improving education around the world and establishing schools in Muslim countries that will replace the current madrassas.

I am also pleased that the legislation addresses the root causes of terrorism in a proactive manner. This is an issue that I have spent a good deal of time on in the past year because I believe so strongly that we are all more secure when children and adults around the world are taught math and science instead of hate. The bill we are voting on today includes authorization for an International Youth Opportunity Fund, which will provide resources to build schools in Muslim countries. The legislation also acknowledges that the U.S. has a vested interest in committing to a long-term, sustainable investment in education around the globe. Some of this language is modeled on legislation that I introduced in September, The Education for All Act of 2004, and I believe it takes us a small step towards eliminating madrassas and replacing them with schools that provide a real education to all children.

Clinton has sponsored and co-sponsored several bills relating to protecting Americans from acts of terrorism, as well as providing assistance to the victims of such acts.

In February 2006, then-Senator Clinton, along with Senator Robert Menendez, introduced legislation to bar companies controlled by foreign governments from buying U.S. port operations. Clinton and Menendez expressed concern about port security following the Dubai Ports World controversy.

=== Humanitarian intervention abroad ===
As first lady, Clinton said, "I am very pleased that this president and administration have made democracy one of the centerpieces of our foreign policy." Clinton favored intervention in Haiti (1994), the Bosnian War (1995), as well as in the Kosovo War (1999). Before the Kosovo war, she phoned Bill Clinton from Africa. As she recalled later, "I urged him to bomb", arguing that Bill Clinton could not let the massacres in Kosovo "go on at the end of a century that has seen the major holocaust of our time."

In a February 2005 speech at the annual Munich Conference on Security Policy, Clinton expressed regret that the international community had failed to effectively intervene in the 1990s during the Rwandan genocide and early in the Bosnian War. She praised the United Nations and NATO interventions that did occur later in the Bosnian War (leading to the Dayton Agreement), Kosovo War, and East Timor. Regarding the ongoing large-scale killing in the Darfur conflict, she then advocated "at least a limited NATO role in logistics, communication and transportation in Darfur in support of the African Union."

During the July 2007 CNN/YouTube Democratic debate, Clinton was characterized by The Chicago Tribune as against U.S. military intervention. Asked again whether U.S. troops should be sent to Darfur, Clinton said the region should see "...sanctions, divestment and UN peacekeepers", but not American ground troops.

=== NATO and U.S. relations with allies ===
Clinton has also criticized the "inflammatory rhetoric" of Ted Cruz and Donald Trump, adding that Trump's proposal to build a wall on the U.S.–Mexico border and his proposed ban on Muslims entering the United States would harm the security of the United States and the world as a whole. Clinton added that Trump's suggestion for the U.S. to withdraw from involvement in the North Atlantic Treaty Organization would benefit the Russian government, saying in an address at Stanford University that: "If Mr. Trump gets his way, it will be like Christmas in the Kremlin." Clinton added that "Putin already hopes to divide Europe." Clinton has said that the U.S.'s partnerships through NATO have been one of the best security investments made by the United States.

Clinton has stressed the role of international alliances and coordination in counterterrorism efforts, saying in March 2016 that "We need our allies as much as ever" and adding that these alliances provide the United States and Europe with a strategic advantage over nations such as China or Russia.

==== U.S. relationship with Britain and other European allies ====
Clinton has affirmed "America's steadfast commitment to the special relationship with Britain and the transatlantic alliance with Europe." After the UK voted in a June 2016 referendum to withdraw from the European Union, Clinton issued a statement saying: "We respect the choice the people of the United Kingdom have made. Our first task has to be to make sure that the economic uncertainty created by these events does not hurt working families here in America. ... This time of uncertainty only underscores the need for calm, steady, experienced leadership in the White House to protect Americans' pocketbooks and livelihoods, to support our friends and allies, to stand up to our adversaries, and to defend our interests."

Clinton has expressed admiration for German Chancellor Angela Merkel, referring to her in 2014 as "the greatest leader in Europe" and praising her role in navigating the Eurozone's sovereign debt crisis.

=== Security vs. human rights ===
In November 2007, when asked "[is] national security more important than human rights?" Clinton responded, "I agree with that completely. The first obligation of the president of the United States is to protect and defend the United States of America. That doesn't mean that it is to the exclusion of other interests. And there's absolutely a connection between a democratic regime [in Pakistan] and heightened security for the United States."

Prior to assuming the role of Secretary of State, Clinton signed an agreement with the administration which precluded the Clinton Foundation from accepting new donations from foreign governments during her tenure in order to mitigate the potential for inappropriate influence of the State Department. In February 2015, the Washington Post reported that the foundation had accepted $500,000 from Algeria in 2010, in apparent violation of her agreement with the administration. The foundation indicated that the donation was to contribute to relief efforts in Haiti. The Post noted that the donation "coincided with a spike" in lobbying efforts by Algeria of the State Department regarding their human rights record.

=== Torture ===
Clinton has pledged to "never condone or practice torture anywhere in the world" if elected president. Clinton has stated that "lots of empirical evidence" shows that torture does not work, a statement rated "true" by PolitiFact. Clinton believes that torture is counterproductive, stating that "It does put our own soldiers, and increasingly our own civilians, at risk."

=== United Nations ===
In February 2005, at the Munich Conference on Security Policy, Clinton outlined her support for a strong United Nations:

My first observation is simple but it must govern all that we do: The United Nations is an indispensable organization to all of us – despite its flaws and inefficiencies. This means quite simply, that everyone here today, and governments everywhere, must decide that our global interests are best served by strengthening the UN, by reforming it, by cleaning up its obvious bureaucratic and managerial shortcomings, and by improving its responsiveness to crises, from humanitarian to political. ... At its founding in San Francisco sixty years ago, fifty members signed the Charter. Today, the UN has 191 members, and, quite frankly, many of them sometimes act against the interests of a stronger UN, whether consciously or not, with alarming regularity. Since the UN is not, in the final analysis, an independent hierarchical organization, like for example a sports team or a corporation, but no more – or less – than a collection of its members, the UN becomes progressively weakened by such action. Ironically, 'the UN' – an abstraction that everyone from journalists to those of us in this room use in common discussions – is often blamed for the actions (or inactions) of its members.

While in the Senate, Clinton co-sponsored a resolution "expressing the sense of the Senate on the importance of membership of the United States on the United Nations Human Rights Commission."

=== Wikileaks ===
Reacting to WikiLeaks and the 2010 U.S. diplomatic cables release, Clinton expressed her condemnation of any disclosure that puts lives at risk and threatens national security.

== Democracy and governmental structure ==
=== D.C. statehood ===
In May 2016 Clinton declared her support for D.C. statehood, saying that she would be a "vocal champion" on the issue if elected.

=== Electoral college ===
In November 2000, Clinton called for a Constitutional amendment to abolish the Electoral College, replacing it with a national popular vote, saying "we are a very different country than we were 200 years ago." "I believe strongly that in a democracy, we should respect the will of the people and to me, that means it's time to do away with the Electoral College and move to the popular election of our president. I hope no one is ever in doubt again about whether their vote counts." She promised to co-sponsor legislation that would abolish it resulting in the direct election of the president.

=== Executive authority ===
Clinton's advisors have said that she believes that the "president usually deserves the benefit of the doubt from Congress on matters of executive authority". In 2003, Clinton stated that she was "a strong believer in executive authority," wishing that when her husband was president, Congress had been more willing to recognize presidential authority.

=== Supreme Court ===
An analysis by FiveThirtyEight shows that, under the assumption that Scalia's vacant seat on the Court will not be filled and taking account of the old age of three of the sitting justices, that under a Clinton presidency, "the court may quickly become the most liberal it's been in at least 80 years."

== Civil liberties and domestic policy ==
The American Civil Liberties Union has given her a 75 percent lifetime rating through 2007.

=== 9/11 responders ===
In 2006, Clinton co-sponsored the Zadroga 9/11 Health Act which became law in 2011. The legislation funds and establishes a health program to provide medical treatment for responders and survivors who experienced or may experience health complications related to the 9/11 terrorist attacks. Since leaving the Senate, Clinton has repeatedly urged Congress to reauthorize the legislation.

=== Abortion and birth control ===
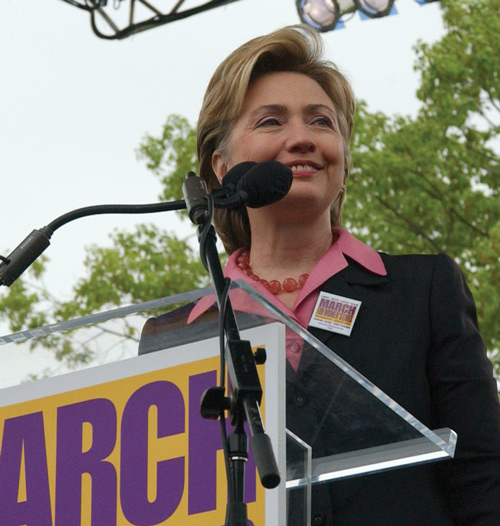
Clinton at the women's rights- and abortion rights-focused March for Women's Lives rally in 2004

Clinton is pro-choice, stating that abortion should be safe and legal. Clinton has stated that "birth control is basic health care". Clinton favors legislation that would make it illegal for pharmacists to refuse to provide access to emergency contraception. Clinton opposes the Hyde Amendment, which bars federal funds to pay for abortion unless the pregnancy arises from incest, rape, or to save the life of the mother.

NARAL Pro-Choice America consistently gave Clinton a 100 percent pro-choice rating from 2002 to 2006. Planned Parenthood endorsed Clinton in 2016, stating that "no other presidential contender in our nation's history has demonstrated such a strong, proactive commitment to women or has such a clear and outspoken record on behalf of women's health and rights."

Clinton has stressed prevention, sexual education, and abstinence. In 2005 and 2006, Senators Clinton and Senator Patty Murray led the opposition towards the Bush administration's attempt to restrict over-the-counter sales of the Plan B contraceptive. In April 2007, Clinton expressed dismay at the Supreme Court's Gonzales v. Carhart ruling that upheld the Partial-Birth Abortion Ban Act.

Clinton opposed the 2014 Burwell v. Hobby Lobby Supreme Court decision, stating, "It's the first time that our court has said that a closely held corporation has the rights of a person when it comes to religious freedom, which means the corporation's employers can impose their religious beliefs on their employees, and, of course, denying women the right to contraceptives as part of a health care plan is exactly that. I find it deeply disturbing that we are going in that direction." In June 2016, she hailed the Supreme Court decision to strike down an anti-abortion law in Texas as "a victory for women in Texas and across America."

Clinton stated in June 2016, "I will always stand with Planned Parenthood. It should be funded, supported and appreciated – not undermined, misrepresented, and demonized."

=== Americans with disabilities ===
Clinton supports the American with Disabilities Act, because "it opened educational opportunities to all Americans, expanded transportation, made sure everyone can enter buildings, and ensured that no one would be turned down for a job because of a disability". As Secretary of State, Clinton tried to get the United States to join the United Nations Convention on the Rights of Persons with Disabilities. Clinton supports the Disability Integration Act, which requires that states and insurance companies provide people with disabilities who need long-term care the choice to receive care at home instead of solely in institutions and nursing facilities." The Disability Integration Act is supported by many disability rights groups. Clinton has called for closing a loophole that allows employers to gain an exemption from the minimum for workers with disabilities.

=== Anti-terrorism and domestic surveillance ===
Clinton voted for the USA PATRIOT Act in October 2001 when it was first enacted. In December 2005, when a political battle ensued over its renewal, Clinton supported a general filibuster against it, on the grounds that the renewal legislation did not appropriate enough money to New York for anti-terrorism efforts. During the renewal debate she expressed some concerns with it regarding civil liberties. She then voted in favor of a compromise renewed act in March 2006 that passed.

Regarding the December 2005 NSA warrantless surveillance controversy, Clinton stated that she was "troubled" by President Bush's 2002 actions. In a statement, she said: "The balance between the urgent goal of combating terrorism and the safeguarding of our most fundamental constitutional freedoms is not always an easy one to draw. However, they are not incompatible, and unbridled and unchecked executive power is not the answer."

Following the 2016 mass shooting at Pulse, a gay nightclub in Orlando, Clinton called for creating more "integrated intelligence use" among local, state and national law enforcement; "strengthening communication" with other countries; and working with Silicon Valley to "prevent online radicalization."

==== Edward Snowden ====
Clinton has called for Edward Snowden to face trial, saying "He broke the laws of the United States. He could have been a whistleblower, he could have gotten all the protections of a whistleblower. He chose not to do that. He stole very important information that has fallen into the wrong hands so I think he should not be brought home without facing the music." PolitiFact rated her statement that Snowden could have gotten the protections of a whistleblower as "mostly false", noting that "the protections that Clinton referenced do not seem to be as strong as she suggested, and most of the expert opinion suggests they would not apply to Snowden."

=== Arts and culture ===
Clinton has frequently expressed support for the arts and humanities. Clinton served as honorary chairwoman of a committee that issued a report, Creative America, in February 1997, calling for an appropriation by $2 per citizen by the year 2000 for museums, libraries, the National Endowment for the Arts, and the National Endowment for the Humanities, which would represent a modest increase in federal arts and humanities spending. Clinton's position was in contrast to that of congressional Republicans who called for an end to all federal funding of the National Endowment for the Arts. Clinton stated at the time that: "The arts and humanities can offer children safe and productive alternatives to crime, violence, gangs and drugs, transporting them beyond the bounds of their difficult circumstances."

While in the Senate, Clinton—along with fellow New York Senator Chuck Schumer—unsuccessfully pushed for the inclusion of a $1 million appropriation for the Museum at Bethel Woods (a museum commemorating the Woodstock Music Festival of 1969) in a 2007 omnibus health and education spending bill. Republicans criticized the proposed expenditure as wasteful, while Schumer and Clinton said that the museum would "continue to promote education, the arts, culture and tourism in the region."

In January 2013, while secretary of state, Clinton published an article in Vanity Fair magazine, writing that "art is also a tool of diplomacy" and promoting the Department of State's longstanding Art in Embassies Program.

While campaigning in 2015, Clinton expressed support for art education, saying: "I believe that the arts and culture are important in their own right ... but they're also important drivers for economic growth, tourism, and attracting young people."

=== Capital punishment ===
Clinton is not in favor of abolishing capital punishment "because I do think there are certain egregious cases that still deserve the consideration of the death penalty, but I'd like to see those be very limited and rare, as opposed to what we've seen in most states." She has encouraged the federal government to rethink the use of capital punishment, citing concerns over the frequent and discriminatory application of the punishment.

Clinton sponsored the Innocence Protection Act, which requires DNA testing before administering federal executions. In regards to the Justice Department's decision to seek the death penalty for Dylann Roof, her spokesperson said "she respects the Justice Department decision."

=== Church and state ===
In a 2005 speech, Clinton said that religious political officials should be able to "live out their faith in the public square."

Speaking at an event for candidates on faith and compassion in April 2008, Clinton said that "we want religion to be in the public square. If you are a person of faith, you have a right and even an obligation to speak from that wellspring of your faith."

=== Crime ===
Clinton summarizes her key proposals on criminal justice reform as follows:

- "End the era of mass incarceration, reform mandatory minimum sentences, and end private prisons."
- "Encourage the use of smart strategies — like police body cameras — and end racial profiling to rebuild trust between law enforcement and communities."
- "Help formerly incarcerated individuals successfully re-enter society."

According to PolitiFact, Clinton "focuses more on what happens before prison (such as sentencing of people not currently incarcerated) and after prison (especially reintegrating ex-convicts into society after they are released) than actually releasing current inmates." As for releasing current inmates, Clinton focuses on nonviolent offenders.

In 2000, during a Senate debate in Manhattan, Clinton voiced her support for drug courts to address drug abuse problems when she stated, "We need more treatment [for drug addicts]. It is unfair to urge people to get rid of their addiction and not have the treatment facilities when people finally make up their minds to get treatment."

In 2001, Clinton co-sponsored legislation that would create more tracking and harsher sentences for hate crimes.

In a speech in April 2015, Clinton said that body-worn cameras for police should be "the norm everywhere." During the same speech, she also urged an end to excessive prison sentences that burden black communities. She said that reform of mandatory sentencing laws are "long overdue" and criticized the militarization of police.

In March 2016, when asked about the Violent Crime Control and Law Enforcement Act of 1994 signed into law by Bill Clinton that she supported at the time, she said that "there were some aspects that worked well" including violence against women provisions, but she noted that other portions related to increasing incarceration "were a mistake." In 1994, she referred to the bill as a "very well-thought-out crime bill that is both smart and tough," and voiced support for three strikes laws when she stated "We need more police, we need more and tougher prison sentences for repeat offenders. The three strikes and you're out for violent offenders has to be part of the plan." According to the Marshall Project's reporting, Clinton's position on the 1994 crime bill started to shift in a 1998 column as she picked and chose "from the crime bill's legacy, emphasizing the gun-control measures, prevention programs for juveniles, and funding for more police officers, without mentioning the law's contributions to mass incarceration."

=== Drug policy ===
During her 2016 campaign, Clinton had proposed a $10 billion plan, much of which would have been funded by the federal government, intended to treat those suffering from addiction, increase emergency responders' access to a life-saving rescue drug targeting overdoses, and curb incarceration for nonviolent drug offenses.

Clinton supports diversion programs such as treatment-focused drug courts, saying in 2007: "Non-violent offenders should not be serving hard time in our prisons. They need to be diverted from our prison system."

==== Sentencing disparities ====
While in the Senate, Clinton supported reducing the sentencing disparity that punished crack cocaine crimes more harshly than powder cocaine crimes, and in 2015, Clinton called for eliminating the disparity, saying: "We're talking about two forms of the same drug. It makes no sense to continue treating them differently." (A 1986 federal law created a 100:1 power-crack disparity; the Fair Sentencing Act of 2010 reduced this to an 18:1 disparity). While campaigning in 2007, Clinton did not support making the elimination of the sentencing disparity retroactive, but in 2015 she expressed support for making change retroactively as well as prospectively.

==== Marijuana ====
Clinton supports rescheduling marijuana, legalizing medical marijuana, and the right of states to legalize recreational marijuana. She has called for greater research on the subject. Her views on marijuana were described in 2015 as similar to the "cautious, leave-it-to-the-states strategy" of the Obama administration.

In May 2007, Clinton suggested the federal government was being "excessive" in its approach to patients who used medical marijuana. The following month, while campaigning in New Hampshire, Clinton has said she would end federal raids against such patients in states where the use of marijuana for medical purposes is legal. In June 2014, Clinton said that on medical marijuana, "I don't think we've done enough research yet. Although I think for people who are in extreme medical conditions and have anecdotal evidence that it works, there should be availability under appropriate circumstances. But I do think we need more research, because we don't know how it interacts with other drugs." On recreational marijuana, which has been legalized in 25 states as of 2024, Clinton said: "states are the laboratories of democracy. We have at least two states that are experimenting with that right now. I want to wait and see what the evidence is."

In April 2016, Clinton stated that she favored the removal of marijuana from Schedule I of the Controlled Substances Act, which would make scientific studies of the substance significantly easier. Clinton also stated: "We have enough anecdotal evidence ... about what marijuana can do for medical conditions, easing pain. And we need to be doing research on it because I am 100 percent in favor of medical uses for marijuana. But I want to know what the evidence is." In her 2016 policy position on marijuana, Clinton says that she supports rescheduling marijuana to Schedule II; "allowing states that have enacted marijuana laws to act as laboratories of democracy, as long as they adhere to certain federal priorities such as not selling to minors, preventing intoxicated driving, and keeping organized crime out of the industry"; and "focus[ing] federal enforcement resources on violent crime, not simple marijuana possession."

==== Opioid crisis ====
While campaigning for the presidency, Clinton has hosted forums on the opioid addiction crisis in the United States, listing it as a top concern. Clinton has pledged to make substance-abuse treatment, including medication-assisted treatment, available to more addicts. Clinton also has pledged to make naloxone (Narcan), an antidote to opioid overdose, available to all police departments.

=== Education ===
Clinton voted for President Bush's No Child Left Behind Act in 2001, but subsequently criticized the program because of the government's failure to fully fund it. In June 2007, with the Act up for renewal by Congress, Clinton criticized the program, saying that its emphasis on testing has caused American children to narrow their studies and lose their creative edge. In 2007, Clinton stated "No Child Left Behind has been a terrible imposition on teachers and school districts and families and students." Clinton said that she believed in accountability and acknowledged "a place for testing," but said that the U.S. had "gone overboard" with too much emphasis on testing. In 2008, Clinton called for extensive changes to the act, saying that she would put an end to the unfunded mandate called No Child Left Behind." In 2008, Clinton said: "I will work to reduce the teaching to the test and bring back a well-rounded curriculum and change the one-size-fits-all approach to addressing the challenges facing struggling schools.

In 2015, Clinton praised an Obama administration initiative to reduce unnecessary standardized testing. Clinton stated: "While testing can provide communities with full information about how our students are doing and help us determine whether we have achievement gaps, we can and must do better. We should be ruthless in looking at tests and eliminating them if they do not actually help us move our kids forward. I embrace the principles laid out today by the Obama administration because they move us in the right direction. Standardized tests must be worth taking, high quality, time-limited, fair, fully transparent to students and parents, just one of multiple measures, and tied to improving learning."

Clinton has been a longtime supporter of early childhood education. During her 2008 campaign for the Democratic nomination for president, Clinton has proposed a $10 billion matching grant program for the states to provide universal access to voluntary pre-kindergarten programs. In 2015, in one of her first policy speeches during the 2016 campaign, Clinton again pledged to work for affordable access to prekindergarten for every American four-year-olds if elected president. Clinton has specifically proposed giving incentives to states "to provide public preschool to children whose family incomes are below 200 percent of the federal poverty line."

Clinton has often emphasized the importance of community colleges in the United States, and on the campaign trail met with community college students and called for more community-college funding. Clinton has also emphasized the importance of vocational and technical education, saying that one of the U.S.'s "biggest errors was getting rid of all technical and vocational education in most of our high schools." Clinton has proposed an expansion of apprenticeships in the United States, proposed new tax credits for businesses that hire and train apprentices (a $1,500 tax credit for each apprentice under 25 years old and a $1,000 tax credit for each older apprentice).

Clinton is against education vouchers for use at private schools. On September 13, 2000, she said, "I do not support vouchers. And the reason I don't is because I don't think we can afford to siphon dollars away from our underfunded public schools." Outlining a different objection, on February 21, 2006, she said: "First family that comes and says 'I want to send my daughter to St. Peter's Roman Catholic School' and you say 'Great, wonderful school, here's your voucher.' Next parent that comes and says, 'I want to send my child to the school of the Church of the White Supremacist ... ' The parent says, 'The way that I read Genesis, Cain was marked, therefore I believe in white supremacy. ... You gave it to a Catholic parent, you gave it to a Jewish parent, under the Constitution, you can't discriminate against me.' So what if the next parent comes and says, 'I want to send my child to the School of the Jihad'? ... I won't stand for it."

Clinton supports the Common Core State Standards. She said this about Common Core: "The really unfortunate argument that's been going on around Common Core, it's very painful because the Common Core started off as a bipartisan effort. It was actually nonpartisan. It wasn't politicized. ... Iowa has had a testing system based on a core curriculum for a really long time. And [speaking to Iowans] you see the value of it, you understand why that helps you organize your whole education system. And a lot of states unfortunately haven't had that, and so don't understand the value of a core, in this sense a Common Core."

Clinton has supported charter schools as early as the 1990s. During her campaign for the presidency in 2015, Clinton expressed support for charter schools as long as they are high quality, and expressed support for federal funding to expand "high-quality charter schools." Clinton said that she did not support requiring school districts to tie teacher pay to student test scores.

At a town-hall meeting in November 2015, Clinton said that she had for thirty years "supported the idea of charter schools, ... not as a substitute for the public schools, but as a supplement for the public schools" and said that "there are good charter schools and there are bad charter schools, just like there are good public schools and bad public schools." Clinton stated that "Most charter schools—I don't want to say every one—but most charter schools, they don't take the hardest-to-teach kids, or, if they do, they don't keep them." FactCheck.org found that Clinton's "broad claim" on charter schools and the hardest-to-teach students was "not supported by the evidence", noting that a GAO report found that information on "why enrollment levels of students with disabilities in charter schools and traditional public schools differ" is anecdotal, and that while some charter schools had high rates of expulsion, the evidence did not show that "most" charter schools had high rates of expulsion.

=== Faith-based initiatives ===
Clinton supports faith-based programs that address social issues and provide social services, saying that "there is no contradiction between support for faith-based initiatives and upholding our constitutional principles."

=== Gun control ===
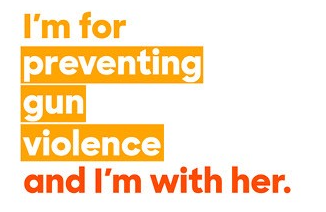
2016 graphic made by Hillary for America

Clinton was the "first candidate to produce an extensive position paper on guns and gun violence" during the 2016 campaign. Her plan calls for strengthening background checks for firearm purchases and closing loopholes in the current system by requiring, for example, background checks on purchases at gun shows; barring firearm sales to suspected terrorists, as well as "domestic abusers, other violent criminals, and the severely mentally ill"; and reinstating the now-expired Federal Assault Weapons Ban, which Clinton voted for in the Senate.

Clinton's opponent in the 2016 presidential election, Donald Trump, has repeatedly and falsely claimed that Clinton has advocated "abolishing" the Second Amendment. PolitiFact found "no evidence that Clinton has ever advocated for repealing or abolishing the Second Amendment," and FactCheck.org found Trump's statement to be a distortion of Clinton's actual views.

Clinton supports the Brady Handgun Violence Prevention Act of 1993 (the "Brady Bill"), which mandates federal background checks on firearm purchasers and imposes a five-day waiting period on purchases. During the 2016 Democratic presidential primaries, she criticized Bernie Sanders for voting against the Brady Bill five times.

Clinton opposes what she calls the "Charleston loophole," which allows gun sales to go through without a background after the three-day waiting period for the government to perform a background check runs out. Clinton also opposes the Protection of Lawful Commerce in Arms Act of 2005, which protects firearms manufacturers and dealers from being held liable when crimes have been committed with their products, She has called for the act's repeal, saying: "the industry's sweeping legal protection for illegal and irresponsible actions ... makes it almost impossible for people to hold them accountable."

Clinton disagrees with the Supreme Court's decision in District of Columbia v. Heller, in which a divided Court struck down, by 5–4 vote, a handgun ban in Washington D.C. and found an individual right to keep and bear arms in the Second Amendment (as opposed to a right to keep and bear arms only as part of a "well-regulated militia"). A Clinton spokesman said that Clinton "believes Heller was wrongly decided in that cities and states should have the power to craft common sense laws to keep their residents safe."

Clinton suggested on one occasion in 2015 that Australia's gun buyback program was "worth looking at" and "worth looking into," although such a program is not part of her gun policy proposals. Although the Australian program was compulsory, Clinton referenced it alongside voluntary gun buyback programs conducted in U.S. communities, comparing them to President Obama's Cash for Clunkers program.

Clinton made gun licensing and registration a part of her 2000 Senate campaign.

Clinton was taught to shoot and hunt by her father. On hunting and shooting, Clinton said in 2008: "It's part of culture. It's part of a way of life. People enjoy hunting and shooting because it's an important part of who they are." In the 1999 Proposition B in Missouri campaign, which would have allowed concealed carry of firearms in the state, Clinton's voice was used in a robocall message aimed at women, saying "It's just too dangerous for Missouri families." She made gun rights a part of her 2008 Presidential campaign, after highlighting the importance of passing "gun-safety laws" during her 2000 campaign for the Senate, although according to Politico her messages were not directly contradictory.

In 2016, the Brady Campaign to Prevent Gun Violence endorses Clinton for president, saying that she "has been a national leader on gun violence prevention for decades" and "has the experience, record, and demonstrated commitment to help reach the Brady Campaign's goal of cutting gun deaths in half by 2025." She has received an "F" rating from the National Rifle Association of America; the NRA, which endorsed Trump, has been a longtime Clinton adversary.

=== Habeas corpus ===
Clinton "vigorously opposed" and voted against the Military Commissions Act of 2006, which changed the law to explicitly forbid the invocation of the Geneva Conventions when executing the writ of habeas corpus or in other civil actions. Clinton called the act "deeply troubling" and said: "Our Nation must not indefinitely detain anyone without safeguards to ensure we are holding the right person. This is one of the bedrock principles enshrined in our Constitution; it is the way our Founders believed we could be secure against those who would abuse government power. I believe we do not have to abandon our constitutional principles or our values as Americans in the name of fighting terrorism."

Clinton was a co-sponsor of the Habeas Corpus Restoration Act in 2007.

=== Income inequality ===
Clinton believes that income inequality is a barrier to equal opportunity. She has suggested that the growing inequality is reminiscent of the Gilded Age of the robber barons: "economists have documented how the share of income and wealth going to those at the very top, not just the top 1% but the top .1% or the .01% of the population, has risen sharply over the last generation. Some are calling it a throwback to the Gilded Age of the robber barons."

=== Space ===
Clinton has said that investments in the space program has "prompted a long period of American leadership in science and technology, and spurred a generation of innovators." She wants to "advance inspirational, achievable, and affordable space initiatives. We must maintain our nation's leadership in space with a program that balances science, technology and exploration; protect our security and the future of the planet through international collaboration and Earth systems monitoring; expand our robotic presence in the solar system; and maximize the impact of our R&D and other space program investments by promoting stronger coordination across federal agencies, and cooperation with industry."

=== Technology policy ===
==== Net neutrality ====
Clinton strongly supports net neutrality. Senator Clinton was a cosponsor of the Internet Freedom Preservation Act, also known as the Snowe-Dorgan bill, as an amendment to the Telecommunications Act of 1996, that protects network neutrality in the United States. The bill aims to protect internet consumers and small businesses from Internet service providers charging large companies different amounts for Internet access than smaller customers. Clinton has stated that the Internet must continue to use an "open and non-discriminatory framework" so that it may be used as a forum where "views are discussed and debated in an open forum without fear of censorship or reprisal". In 2007, she stated, "I support net neutrality ... [The Internet] does not decide who can enter its marketplace and it does not pick which views can be heard and which ones silenced. It is the embodiment of the fundamental democratic principles upon which our nation has thrived for hundreds of years." While secretary of state, Clinton delivered a major speech (entitled "Remarks of Internet Freedom") in January 2010, declaring that "We stand for a single Internet where all of humanity has equal access to knowledge and ideas." In her 2016 platform, Clinton proposed to defend and enforce "the FCC decision under the Obama Administration to adopt strong network neutrality rules that deemed internet service providers to be common carriers under Title II of the Communications Act."

==== Broadband competition and access ====
Clinton has been critical of the lack of broadband competition, stating that the monopolies "[use] their power to raise prices, limit choices for consumers, lower wages for workers, and hold back competition from startups and small businesses." Her 2016 platform proposes to "reduce regulatory barriers to the private provision of broadband services", "coordinate the development of broadband infrastructure with other municipal services" and "develop public-private partnerships for broadband." She proposes to create a grant program encouraging local governments to reduce regulatory barriers to private investment; promote "dig once" programs that install fiber or fiber conduit during road construction projects; and develop public-private partnerships.

In June 2016, Clinton released a comprehensive technology plan. The plan calls for every American household to have access to high-speed Internet by 2020, as part of her $275 billion infrastructure program. The plan also proposes expanding free Wi-Fi in public places, such as recreation centers, airports, and train stations. Clinton has said that she would seek "to speed development of next-generation 5G mobile technology and free up spectrum to make way for more connected devices." She has proposed to continue investments in the Connect America Fund, the Rural Utilities Service program, the Broadband Technology Opportunities Program (BTOP), and Lifeline. She wants to expand federal funding to bring free Wi-Fi and high-speed Internet to "recreation centers, public buildings like one-stop career centers, and transportation infrastructure such as train stations, airports, and mass transit systems." She proposed to encourage state and local governments to relax rules that protect incumbents from new competitors, such as "local rules governing utility-pole access that restrain additional fiber and small cell broadband deployment." She proposes to push federal agencies to identify anticompetitive practices "such as tying arrangements, price fixing, and exclusionary conduct," and refer potential violations of antitrust law to the Department of Justice and Federal Trade Commission.

==== Patent reform ====
Clinton has "pledged to continue the Obama Administration's efforts to rein in frivolous lawsuits by patent trolls, supporting laws that would curb forum shopping." She wants to require that specific allegations be made in demand letters and pleadings in patent litigation, and to increase transparency in ownership by making patent litigants disclose the real party in interest.

She has called for faster review of patent applications, and investment in the U.S. Patent and Trademark Office to make it act faster and ensure that only valid patents are issued.

==== Other ====
Clinton opposes the Stop Online Piracy Act (SOPA), stating that the bill would "unnecessarily restrict the free flow of data online".

=== Voting rights ===
In June 2015, Clinton called for sweeping changes in national voter access laws, including automatically registering American citizens to vote at age 18 and mandating 20 days of early voting in all states.

Clinton has criticized laws passed by Republican-controlled state legislatures that do not permit student IDs at polling places, place limits on early voting, and eliminate same-day voter registration. Clinton has said: "Today Republicans are systematically and deliberately trying to stop millions of American citizens from voting. What part of democracy are they afraid of?" Clinton alleged that Republican efforts to limit voter registration have a disproportionate impact on "people of color, poor people and young people." In 2013, Clinton gave a speech to the American Bar Association, in which she "slammed the Supreme Court's Shelby County ruling that year weakening the Voting Rights Act (VRA), called on Congress to fix the landmark law and urged the Obama administration to step up enforcement of voting rights cases."

=== Kenneth Starr investigation ===
As First Lady, she referred to the Clinton–Lewinsky scandal as being part of a politically motivated "vast right-wing conspiracy" against President Bill Clinton. Clinton later wrote in her 2003 autobiography that "I might have phrased my point more artfully, but I stand by the characterization of [Kenneth] Starr's investigation."

=== LGBT rights ===
First Lady of the United States

On December 9, 1999, Clinton told a group of gay contributors that LGBT people should be allowed to openly serve in the United States military. Also that same day, Clinton spokesman Howard Wolfson stated she supported the Defense of Marriage Act and that "same-sex unions should be recognized and that same-sex unions should be entitled to all the rights and privileges that every other American gets." On January 10, 2000, Clinton stated she opposed legalizing same-sex marriage.

107th United States Congress

In February 2001, Clinton voted against the George W. Bush's nomination of John Ashcroft as United States Attorney General. In March, she cosponsored the Local Law Enforcement Enhancement Act of 2001. In June, Clinton voted in favor of S.Amdt.803 to S.Amdt.562 (which amends S.Amdt.358), which amends the Better Education for Students and Teachers Act and voted against S.Amdt.648 to S.Amdt.574 (which amends S.Amdt.358), which amends the Better Education for Students and Teachers Act. In July, Clinton cosponsored S. Res. 294. and the Employment Non-Discrimination Act of 2002. In November, Clinton voted in favor of S.Amdt. 2107, an amendment to District of Columbia Appropriations Act, 2002. In June 2002, Clinton voted in favor of cloture the Local Law Enforcement Enhancement Act of 2001. Clinton received a score of 100% on the Human Rights Campaign 107th Congress scorecard.

108th United States Congress

In May 2003, Clinton cosponsored the Local Law Enforcement Enhancement Act of 2003. In June, she cosponsored the Domestic Partnership Benefits and Obligations Act of 2003. In October, Clinton cosponsored the Employment Non-Discrimination Act of 2003. In June 2004, Clinton voted in favor of S.Amdt.3183 to the Ronald W. Reagan National Defense Authorization Act for Fiscal Year 2005, as well as the Ronald W. Reagan National Defense Authorization Act for Fiscal Year 2005. In July, Clinton voted against the motion to invoke cloture on the Federal Marriage Amendment. Clinton received a score of 88% on the Human Rights Campaign 108th Congress scorecard.

109th United States Congress

In February 2005, Clinton cosponsored the Early Treatment for HIV Act of 2005. In May 2005, Clinton cosponsored the Local Law Enforcement Enhancement Act of 2005. In June 2005, Clinton voted against George W. Bush's nomination of William H. Pryor Jr. to be a federal judge on the United States Court of Appeals for the Eleventh Circuit. In January 2006, Clinton voted against George W. Bush's nomination of Samuel Alito to be an Associate Justice of the Supreme Court of the United States. In February, she was criticized by gay rights advocates for opposing same-sex marriage, although she approved of civil unions. In June, Clinton voted in favor of S.Amdt. 4689 to the Child Interstate Abortion Notification Act. In July, Clinton voted against the motion to invoke cloture on the Federal Marriage Amendment. In October, Clinton told a group of gay elected officials that she would not oppose the legalization of same-sex marriage in New York if a future governor and state legislature chose to enact it. Clinton also stated that supporting the Defense of Marriage Act was a strategic decision to help derail a constitutional amendment that would have banned same-sex marriage and that it was not fair that the gay partner of Gerry Studds was not receiving his benefits. Her claim about the reason for her support of the Defense of Marriage Act was questioned and her staff urged her not to repeat it. Clinton received a score of 89% on the Human Rights Campaign 109th Congress scorecard.

110th United States Congress

In March 2007, Clinton cosponsored the Early Treatment for HIV Act of 2007. In April, Clinton cosponsored the Matthew Shepard Local Law Enforcement Hate Crimes Prevention Act of 2007 and the Tax Equity for Domestic Partner and Health Plan Beneficiaries Act. On a May 2007 Human Rights Campaign questionnaire, Clinton stated she supported repealing the provision of Defense of Marriage Act that may prohibited the federal government from providing benefits to people in states that recognize same sex marriage. In July 2008, Clinton voted in favor of the Tom Lantos and Henry J. Hyde United States Global Leadership Against HIV/AIDS, Tuberculosis, and Malaria Reauthorization Act of 2008. In September 2007, Clinton voted in favor of S.Amdt. 3035, which amend the National Defense Authorization Act for Fiscal Year 2008. On October 12007, Clinton voted in favor of the National Defense Authorization Act for Fiscal Year 2008, and against Bush's nomination of Leslie Southwick as a federal judge to the United States Court of Appeals for the Fifth Circuit. She received a score of 95% on the Human Rights Campaign 110th Congress scorecard.

Clinton's message to the LGBT community in October 2010

2010s

In June 2011, Clinton endorsed the Marriage Equality Act.

In March 2013, Clinton came out in favor of same-sex marriage. In June, Hillary and Bill Clinton issued a joint statement in favor of ruling in the case of the United States v. Windsor.

During her 2016 campaign, Clinton stressed the importance of anti-discrimination laws covering sexual orientation and gender identity, stating that "you can get married on Saturday and get fired on Monday because we still permit discrimination in employment and in public accommodations."

Alternate version of Clinton's 2016 campaign logo in rainbow colors, used on Twitter and Facebook by the campaign after her April 2015 statement on same-sex marriage

In March 2015, Clinton condemned the Religious Freedom Restoration Act. In April, Adrienne Elrod, spokesperson for Hillary for America, stated that Clinton hoped that the United States Supreme Court would find a constitutional right for same-sex couples to marry nationwide in the case of Obergefell v. Hodges. In June, Clinton praised the ruling in the case of Obergefell v. Hodges. In July, Clinton endorsed the Equality Act of 2015. In October, Clinton came out in favor of allowing transgender people to openly serve in the United States military, and endorsed Proposition 1. She also criticized Senator Rand Paul's comments about LGBT rights, and claimed her husband's reasoning for enacting the Defense of Marriage Act was a defensive action to prevent the political momentum to amend the U.S. Constitution to ban same-sex marriage.

On November 2, 2015, Clinton got into a Twitter fight with Governor Greg Abbott over Proposition 1. On November 6, at the First in the South Candidates Forum, Clinton, when asked why Proposition 1 failed, stated that "the far right did, very successfully, is really engender a lot of fear and a lot of anxiety, and create this backlash against this ordinance. And they used the bathroom issue. And yet, you could go to another city in Texas, like San Antonio, and you would know that that was totally without merit, that there was no basis for it. I think this is a reminder that if you stand for equal rights, if you stand against discrimination, you don't just do it once and you're done," and "You've got to keep fighting for it, you've got to keep standing up for it, you've got to keep moving forward." In December, Clinton revealed a comprehensive plan for LGBT rights, including an endorsement of federal ban LGBT conversion therapy for minors.

In January 2016, Clinton criticized Senator Bernie Sanders for his comments that the Human Rights Campaign was "part of the establishment." In February, Clinton endorsed Florida's Competitive Workforce Act. In March, in an interview with MSNBC at Nancy Reagan's funeral service, Clinton credited Reagan with starting the national conversation about AIDS. Clinton's comments drew heavy criticism from LGBT groups and the media, who said that the Reagans had ignored the issue, causing Clinton to apologize and retract her statement. She also condemned the Public Facilities Privacy & Security Act and Senate Bill 175. In April, she condemned the Religious Liberty Accommodations Act. In July 2016, Clinton stated she was proud of The Pentagon's decision to lift the prohibition on openly transgender people serving in the United States military. In October, she was the first major-party presidential candidate ever to write an op-ed for an LGBT newspaper (Philadelphia Gay News), and her Twitter account stated conversion therapy for minors should be ended.

=== Native American issues ===
Clinton cosponsored the Indian Health Care Improvement Act Amendment of 2007.

During both her 2008 and 2016 campaigns, Clinton has met with Native American leaders and held events on Indian reservations.

During her 2008 run, Clinton released a position statement on Native American issues emphasizing the need to both provide vital services and support tribal sovereignty. Clinton specifically committed, among other things, "to meaningful increases to the Indian Health Service budget"; to improve health care for Native Americans (who suffer from significant health disparities); to "appoint Native Americans to key positions in a number of federal departments and agencies"; to increase funding for the American Indian Head Start Program; to improve housing and law enforcement in Indian country; and to increase support for tribal colleges and universities.

=== Poverty ===
At an April 2008 candidates' forum on faith and compassion, Clinton said that "the incredible demands that God places on us, and that the prophets ask of us, and that Christ called us to respond to on behalf of the poor are unavoidable."

In 2008, Clinton said that if elected president, she would appoint a "cabinet-level poverty czar" focused on "ending poverty as we know it." She was criticized by liberal groups for supporting an increase in the work requirement for welfare.

=== Racial issues ===
According to Clinton, there is "systemic racism in our criminal justice system." She has expressed support for "retraining police officers" and "looking at ways to end racial profiling." Addressing crowds on the campaign trail in 2015 and 2016, Clinton has said both "Yes, black lives matter" and "all lives matter." Clinton has met with Black Lives Matter leadership, to which activist DeRay Mckesson said "We didn't agree about all the issues, but in the end I think that we felt heard." In the meeting Clinton supported ending private prisons and immigration detention centers.

Clinton addressed the African Methodist Episcopal Church in Philadelphia in July 2016, following the killings of two black men by police officers and the subsequent killings of five police officers by a black man in Dallas. According to CNN, she argued that "it was important to acknowledge the 'implicit bias' in society and some police departments and, in particular, called on white Americans to empathize with African-Americans".

=== Scientific research ===
==== Science funding ====
According to Clinton's platform, she "would increase funding for scientific research at agencies like the National Institutes of Health (NIH) and the National Science Foundation," rapidly ramp up NIH spending from about $600 million per year now to $2 billion, and increasing funding for autism research.

==== Stem cell research ====
Clinton cosponsored the Stem Cell Research Enhancement Act of 2005, which called for federal funding of stem cell research based on stem cell lines derived from discarded human embryos. The bill was vetoed by President Bush. She also voted for the 2007 bill with the same name that passed in Congress.

=== Veterans ===
Clinton has spoken in favor of overhauling governance of the Department of Veterans Affairs (VA) and reforming veterans' health care. She has described the problems at the VA as "serious, systemic and unacceptable." Clinton favors allowing the federal government to contract with private companies to provide some veterans' healthcare services, but opposes outright privatization of the VA.

On MSNBC's Rachel Maddow Show in October 2015, Maddow asked Clinton about the controversy over VA patients that have been backlogged and put on secret waiting lists while waiting for an appointment. (An audit by the VA Inspector General in 2014 found that 57,000 veterans had waited more than 90 days for their scheduled appointments, and that approximately 70 percent of VA facilities maintained secret, off-the-books waiting lists of patients.) Maddow asked Clinton about her thoughts on Republican ideas to abolish the VA or privatize the VA, and what she would do to fix the problems at the VA. In response, Clinton acknowledged that there were problems, "but it's not been as widespread as it has been made out to be. There have been a number of surveys of veterans, and overall, veterans who do get treated are satisfied with their treatment ... Nobody would believe that from the coverage that you see and the constant berating of the VA that comes from the Republicans, in part, in pursuit of this ideological agenda that they have." Clinton said that recent efforts to speed up treatment for veterans should be given a chance to work, but that VA health reforms may need a "SWAT team" to ensure accountability.

=== Video game regulation ===
Clinton urged an inquiry into the "Hot Coffee" mod of the video game Grand Theft Auto: San Andreas, which unlocked hidden sexually graphic images. She said that if the game's manufacturer did not change the game's ESRB rating from M (Mature 17+) to AO (Adults Only 18+), she would introduce federal legislation to regulate video games. On July 20, 2005, the ESRB changed the rating and as a result, the game was removed from the shelves of Wal-Mart, Target, Best Buy, and other stores.

Five months later, Clinton introduced the legislation anyway. In December 2005, Clinton introduced the Family Entertainment Protection Act, S.2126, a bill that would prohibit the sale of sexual or violent video games to anybody under the age of 18.

=== Women's rights ===
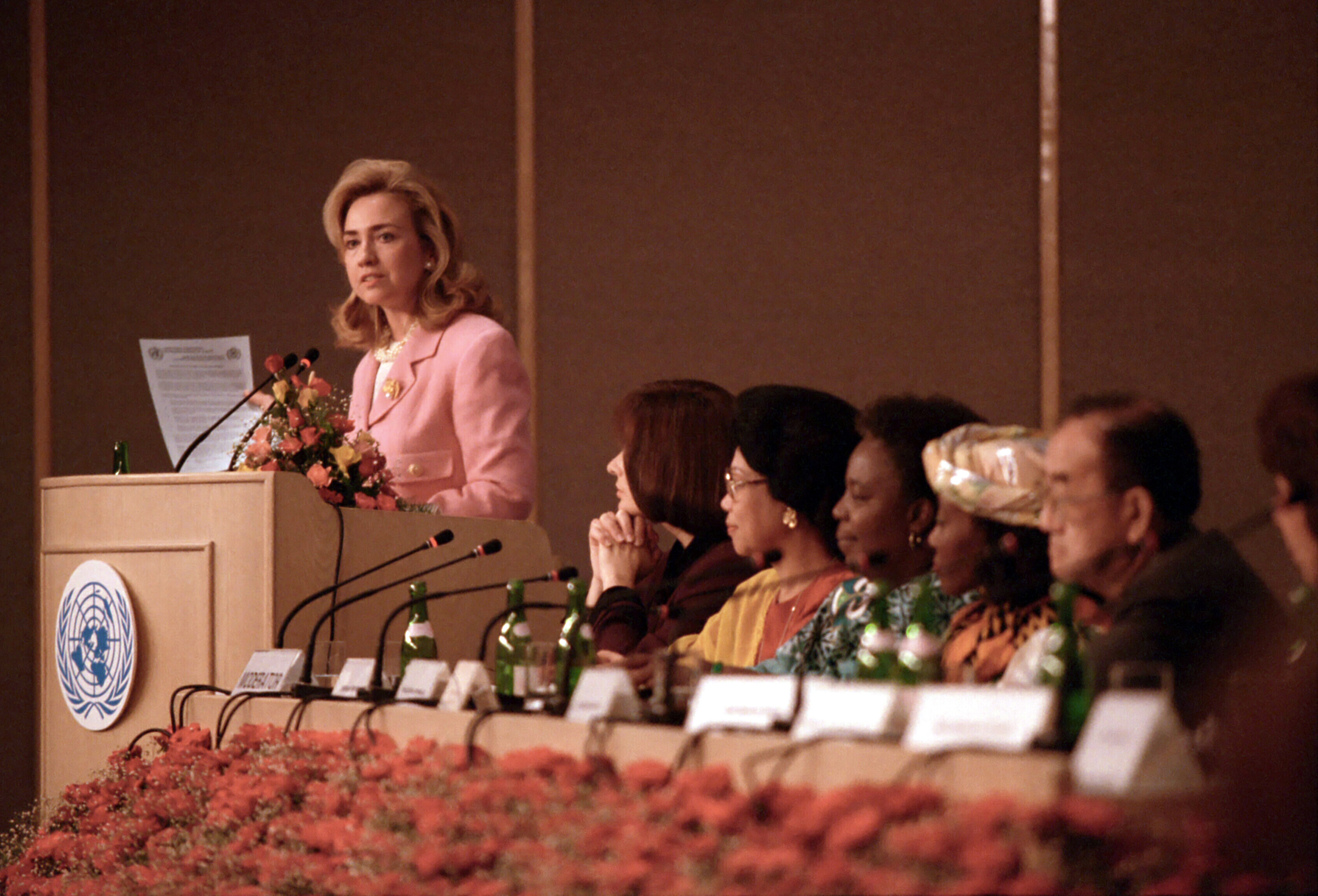
Clinton delivering the "Women's rights are human rights" speech in 1995

Clinton gave an influential speech called "Women's Rights are Human Rights" on September 5, 1995, at the United Nations Fourth World Conference on Women in Beijing. In 2013, the Clinton Foundation and Gates Foundation partnered to study the progress of women and girls around the world since the 1995 conference, called "No Ceilings: The Full Participation Project."

Clinton has promoted equal pay for equal work and proposes action to close the gender pay gap. She supports the Paycheck Fairness Act. As a Senator, she co-sponsored the Lilly Ledbetter Fair Pay Act of 2009; during her 2016 campaign, Clinton received the endorsement of the Act's namesake, Lilly Ledbetter. As Secretary of State, Clinton created the post of Ambassador-at-Large for Global Women's Issues, and called for the U.S. to ratify the Convention on the Elimination of All Forms of Discrimination Against Women, which was signed by President Jimmy Carter in 1980 but never ratified by the Senate.

In 2014, Clinton supported an Oregon state Equal Rights Amendment, which provided legal protection against discrimination based on sex. In 2014 and 2015, she said that she was a feminist, defining feminism as favoring equal rights for women. She also criticized those who considered feminism as outdated, and said women and girls were "central to our foreign policy," claiming that nations that support women are more stable and "less likely to breed extremism."

Clinton said in 2016 that if elected president, half of her Cabinet would have been women, a move that would have been historic, considering gender-equal cabinets are rare worldwide.

=== Zika ===
Clinton has been critical of Congress's handling of the Zika outbreak in Florida. In August 2016, she stated that she was "very disappointed that the Congress went on recess before agreeing what resources to put in this fight." She stated that "We need to step up mosquito control and abatement, provide families with critical health services, including access to contraception, develop a vaccine and treatment, and ensure people know how to protect themselves and their kids."
