= United States Hispanic Chamber of Commerce =

American Hispanic business organization

- Founded: 1979
- Type: Education, Advocacy
- Purpose: Education, Business Advocacy
- Location: Washington, DC
- Region served: United States
- Key people: Ramiro Cavazos, President and CEO; Jackie Puente, Chairwoman;
- Website: http://ushcc.com

The United States Hispanic Chamber of Commerce (USHCC) is the largest Hispanic business organization in the United States. It was founded in 1979 and is headquartered in Washington, DC.

The chamber promotes the economic growth and development of entrepreneurs and represents the interests of nearly 4.7 million Hispanic owned businesses in the US that contribute in excess of $700 billion to the American economy. It serves as the umbrella organization for more than 250 local chambers and business associations in the United States and Puerto Rico. Additionally, it advocates for the 259 major American companies who are its supporting members.

The association is bipartisan. It regularly invites public officials and political candidates from both sides of the aisle to present to its members.

== Studies ==
In September 2015, the chamber and the business intelligence firm, Geoscape, released a study showing that Hispanic businesses grew at an annual rate of 7.5% between 2012 and 2015, "which is 15 times faster than the .5% percent growth rate for all companies." Since 2007, the number of Hispanic-owned businesses increased by 57% to 4.07 million, and revenues at these companies grew by 88% to roughly $660 billion.

== Annual National Convention ==
Each year, the chamber hosts its national convention and business expo. This is the country's largest networking venue for Hispanic businesses and Fortune 1000 corporations interested in the Hispanic market. The four-day convention affords Hispanic vendors and corporate buyers the opportunity to establish partnerships; provides sessions and discussions about business development, chamber training, innovative trends and solutions; and focuses on current issues that impact the Hispanic entrepreneur. The 2015 convention, held in Houston, TX, had 6,000 people in attendance.

== Annual Legislative Summit ==
Each year during the session of the United States Congress, the chamber hosts its annual Legislative Summit. The summit provides chamber members, Hispanic business leaders, and corporate executives the opportunity to discuss legislative policy issues that impact the small business community. Hispanic chamber executives also use the opportunity to meet with their Congressional representatives. In addition, every two years, the chamber issues its Legislative Policy and Priorities to the White House and Congress.

== Annual Energy Summit ==
In April 2022 the USHCC hosted their first ever Energy Summit in Santa Fe, NM. The summit expands the reach of the organization's convention by allowing Hispanic business leaders and executives to discuss energy policy and issues affecting the energy sector in the 21st century. The summit focuses both on natural and renewable resources with focus on the sustainability of both. The inaugural summit featured partnerships with notable energy companies like PNM and AVANGRID. Notable Panelists include former Commissioner of the Public Utility Commission of Texas Rolando Pablos and Lea Márquez Peterson Current Commissioner on the Arizona Corporation Commission.

== See also ==
- Chamber of commerce
- Greater Philadelphia Hispanic Chamber of Commerce
- Mid-Atlantic Hispanic Chamber of Commerce
- Tampa Bay Hispanic Chamber of Commerce
- Hispanic Chamber of E-Commerce
- United States Chamber of Commerce
