= Geoscape Europe =

Company in Amsterdam, the Netherlands

Geoscape Europe provides actionable business and geographic marketing intelligence via data, technology and analytical services to help multinationals access high-growth opportunities. Geoscape Europe BV is headquartered in Amsterdam, the Netherlands and is an affiliate of Geoscape in the U.S., based in Miami, FL. Geoscape has developed the Geoscape Intelligence System (GIS) a web-based marketing intelligence platform offered as software as service (SaaS).

== History ==
Geoscape International, Inc. was founded in 1995 by César M Melgoza with an emphasis on international and Latin American markets. In 2001, Geoscape began focusing more intently on the multicultural American business environment and in June 2007 engaged the investment firm Goldman Sachs. Geoscape serves clients nationwide from offices in Miami and employees distributed throughout the U.S. Geoscape Europe BV was founded in 2002 and is based in Amsterdam and serves the EMEA and Pacific rim markets.

== Operations ==
In addition to the Geoscape Intelligence System, Geoscape’s principal lines of business are Worldwide Market Data & Map sales and consultancy services. The company provides retailers and other multinationals with marketing information & services to support business strategy to focus on growth opportunities. The company makes micro-level portraits of the market potential by region, neighbourhood or by store location. This information can be used for: benchmarking, predictive modelling, customer profiling, retail network planning, category/brand management, distribution logistics, advertising, direct marketing and database marketing.
