= Apple Inc. =

American multinational technology company

- Apple logo used since 1999

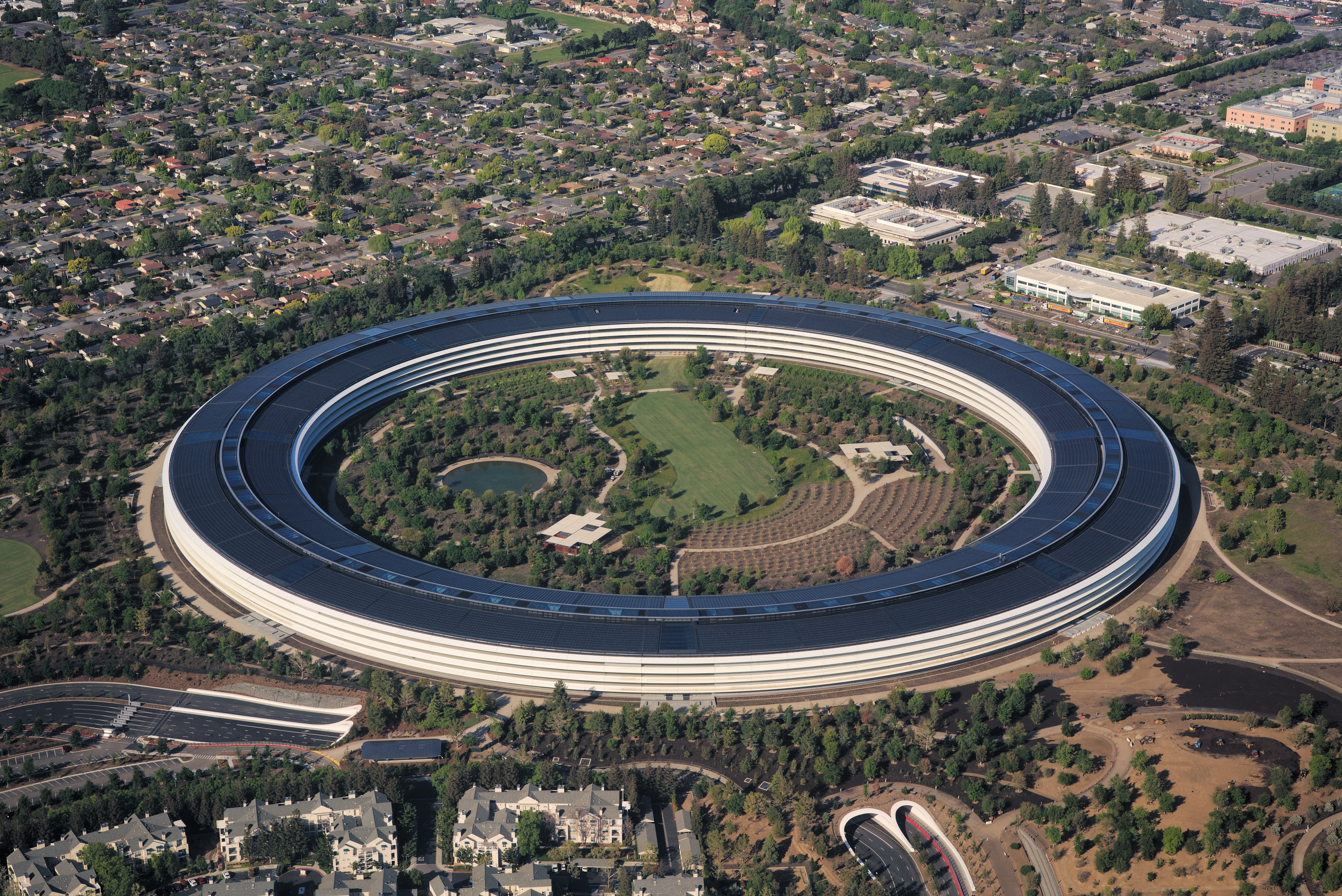
- Apple Park, the company's headquarters, in Cupertino, California
- Formerly: Apple Computer Company (1976–1977); Apple Computer, Inc. (1977–2007)
- Type: Public
- Traded as: Nasdaq: AAPL; Nasdaq-100 component; DJIA component; S&P 100 component; S&P 500 component
- ISIN: US0378331005
- Industry: Technology
- Founded: April 1, 1976 (50 years ago), in Los Altos, California, US
- Founders: Steve Jobs; Steve Wozniak; Ronald Wayne
- Headquarters: Apple Park, Cupertino, California, US
- Number of locations: 540 Apple Stores (2026)
- Area served: Worldwide
- Key people: Tim Cook (chairman); John Ternus (CEO)
- Products: AirPods; Apple TV; Apple Vision Pro; Apple Watch; HomePod; iPad; iPhone; Mac
- Services: App Store; Apple Card; Apple Music; Apple Pay; Apple TV; iCloud
- Revenue: ▲US$479 billion (2026)
- Operating income: ▲US$158 billion (2026)
- Net income: ▲US$132 billion (2026)
- Total assets: ▲US$404 billion (2026)
- Total equity: ▲US$112 billion (2026)
- Number of employees: 166,000 (2025)
- Subsidiaries: Apple Studios; Beats Electronics; Claris
- ASN: 714
- Website: apple.com
- Footnotes; Financials as of fiscal year ended September 27, 2025. References

Apple Inc. is an American multinational technology company headquartered in Cupertino, California, in Silicon Valley, and known for consumer electronics, software and online services. Founded in 1976 as Apple Computer Company by Steve Jobs, Steve Wozniak and Ronald Wayne, the company was incorporated by Jobs and Wozniak as Apple Computer, Inc. the following year. Its current name was adopted in 2007 as the company expanded its focus from computers to consumer electronics. Apple is one of the Big Tech companies.

The company was founded to market Wozniak's Apple I computer. Its successor, the Apple II, became one of the first successful mass-produced personal microcomputers. Apple introduced the Lisa in 1983 and the Macintosh in 1984, popularizing graphical user interfaces navigated by a mouse. By 1985, internal conflicts led to Jobs leaving the company to form NeXT, while Wozniak had assumed a less active role for personal reasons. During the 1990s, Apple lost considerable market share to lower-priced Wintel computers, Intel-powered PC clones running Windows. By 1997, Apple was reporting major losses and struggling to deliver a modernized operating system, leading it to acquire NeXT, which brought Jobs back to the company. Under his leadership, Apple returned to profitability through the iMac, iPod, iPhone, and iPad, the iTunes Store, the Apple Store retail chain, and the "Think different" advertising campaign. Jobs resigned in 2011 for health reasons and died later that year.

Apple's product lineup includes portable and home hardware like the iPhone, iPad, Mac, Apple Watch, and AirPods; several in-house operating systems such as iOS, iPadOS, and macOS; and various software and services including Apple Pay and iCloud, as well as multimedia streaming services like Apple Music and Apple TV. Since 2011, Apple has for the most part been the world's largest company by market capitalization, and, as of 2024, is the largest manufacturing company by revenue, the fourth-largest PC vendor, the largest vendor of tablet computers, and the largest vendor of mobile phones. Apple became the first publicly traded US company to be valued at over $1 trillion in 2018, and, as of November 2025, is valued at just over $5 trillion.

Apple has received criticism regarding its contractors' labor conditions, its relationship with trade unions, its environmental practices, and its corporate ethics, including anti-competitive tactics, materials sourcing, and its acquisitions of smaller businesses. Nevertheless, the company has a large following and enjoys a high level of customer loyalty. Apple has consistently been ranked as one of the world's most valuable brands since the late 2000s.

== History ==
=== 1976–1984: Founding and incorporation ===
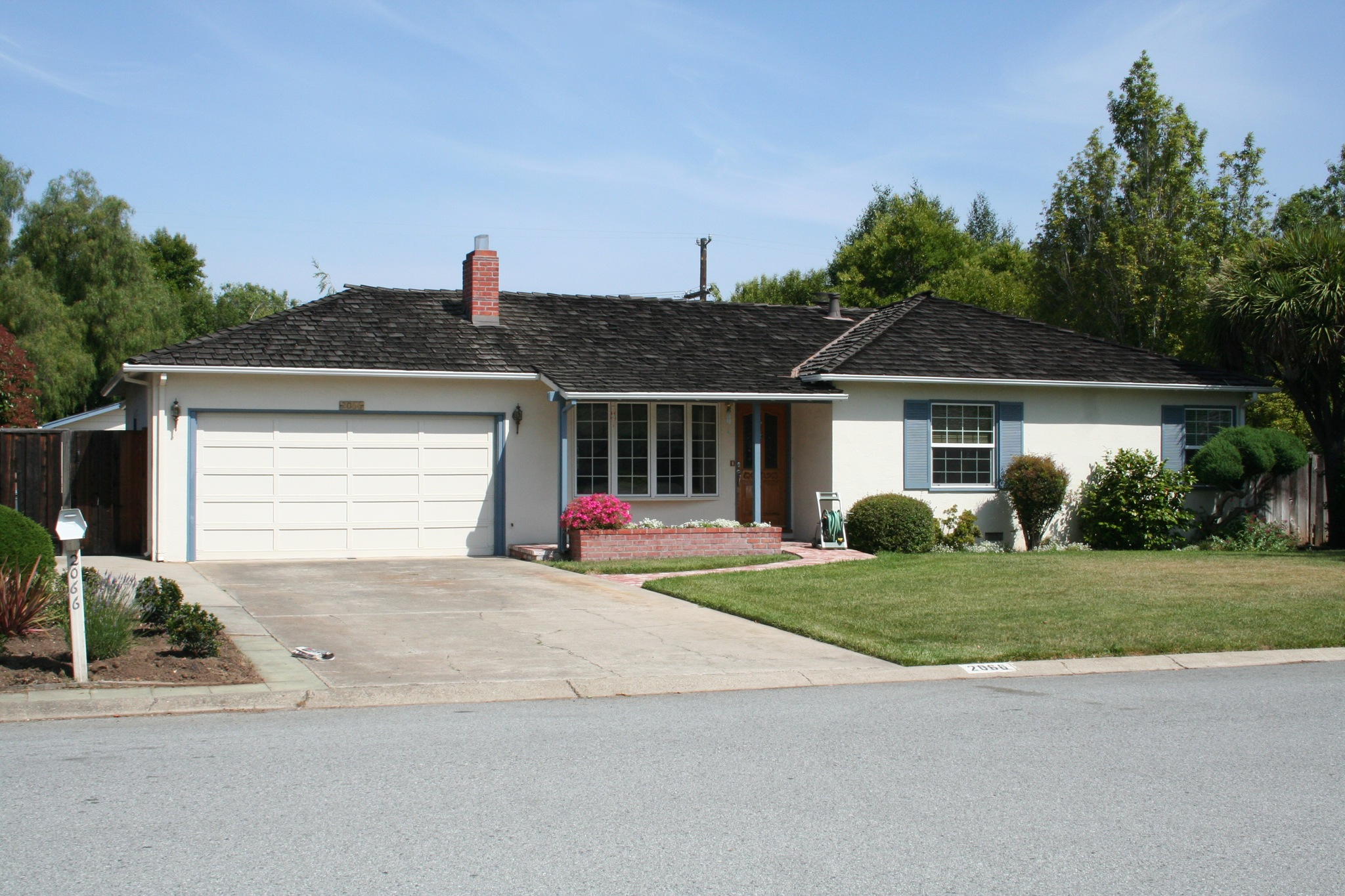
In 1976, Steve Jobs and Steve Wozniak co-founded Apple in Jobs' parents' home in Los Altos, California.

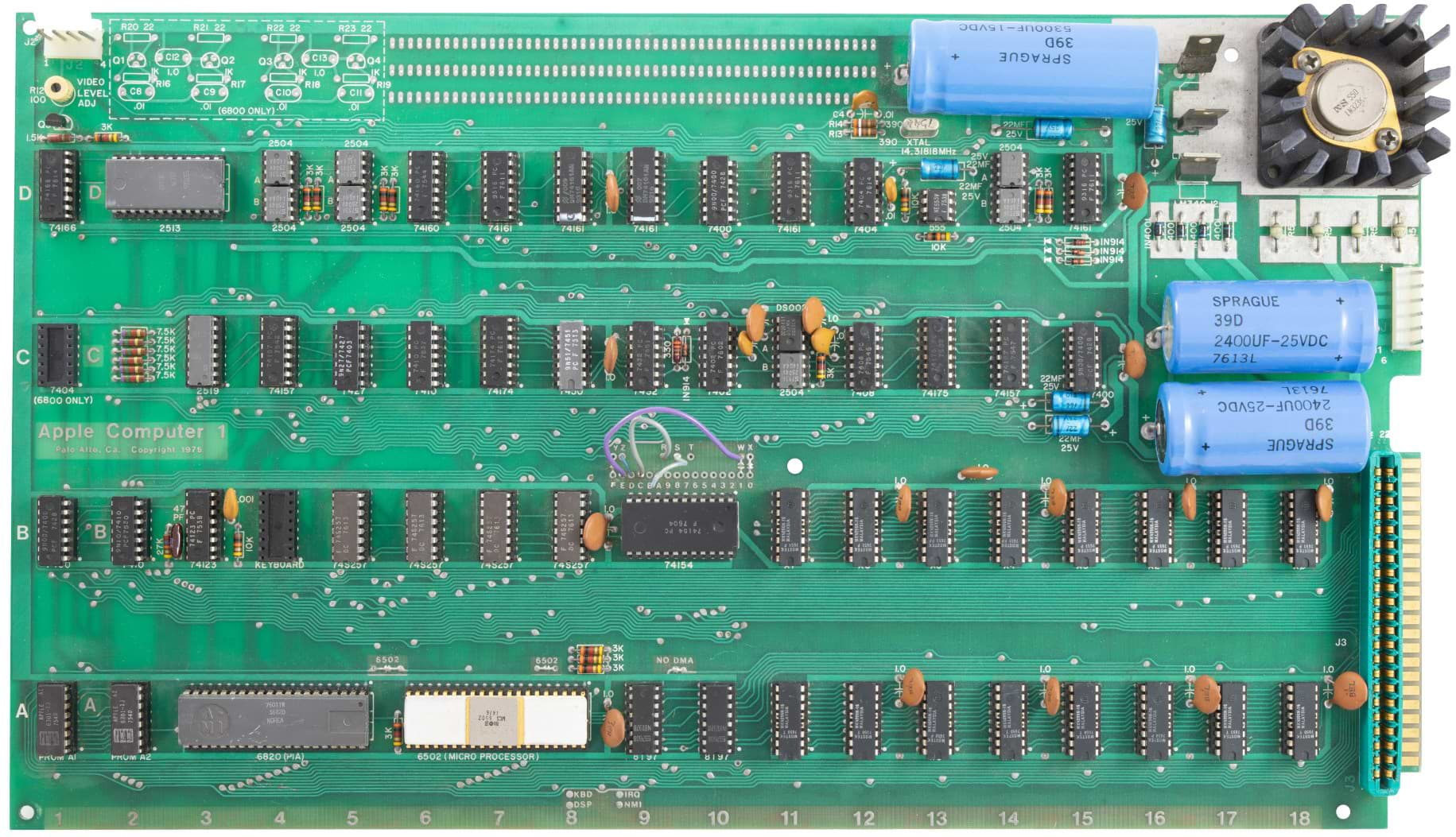
The Apple I, the company's first product, was sold as an assembled board without a keyboard, power supply, or case.

Apple Computer Company was founded as a partnership on April 1, 1976, by Steve Jobs, Steve Wozniak, and Ronald Wayne. The company's first product was the Apple I, designed by Wozniak and hand-built. To finance production, Jobs sold his Volkswagen Bus and Wozniak sold his HP-65 calculator. Although neither received the full selling price, together they raised $1,300 (equivalent to $7,400 in 2025).

Wozniak demonstrated the first Apple I prototype at the Homebrew Computer Club in July 1976, where local computer retailer Byte Shop placed an order for 50 fully assembled computers. Unlike most contemporary hobbyist computers, which were sold as kits requiring assembly, the Apple I came as a pre-assembled motherboard with a CPU, RAM, and built-in video circuitry, allowing it to connect directly to a household television instead of requiring a costly computer terminal. Users still had to provide a case, power supply, and keyboard. It was introduced at a price of $666.66 (equivalent to $3,770 in 2025).

Apple Computer, Inc. was incorporated in Cupertino, California, on January 3, 1977, without Wayne, who had left and sold his share of the company back to Jobs and Wozniak for $800 (equivalent to $4,530 in 2025) twelve days after its founding. Multimillionaire Mike Markkula provided business expertise and invested $250,000 (equivalent to $1,328,000 in 2025) during the company's incorporation. During its first five years, revenue grew rapidly, doubling approximately every four months. Between September 1977 and September 1980, annual sales increased from $775,000 to 118 million, an average annual growth rate of 533%.

The Apple II, also designed by Wozniak, was introduced on April 16, 1977, at the first West Coast Computer Faire. Alongside the Commodore PET 2001 and the TRS-80, it formed the "1977 Trinity" of influential personal computers that established the home computer market. Unlike the Apple I, the Apple II was mass-produced as a complete personal computer housed in a plastic case with a built-in keyboard, color graphics, and an open architecture. Apple introduced the Disk II 5 1/4-inch floppy disk drive in 1978, replacing cassette tape storage with faster and more reliable removable disks.

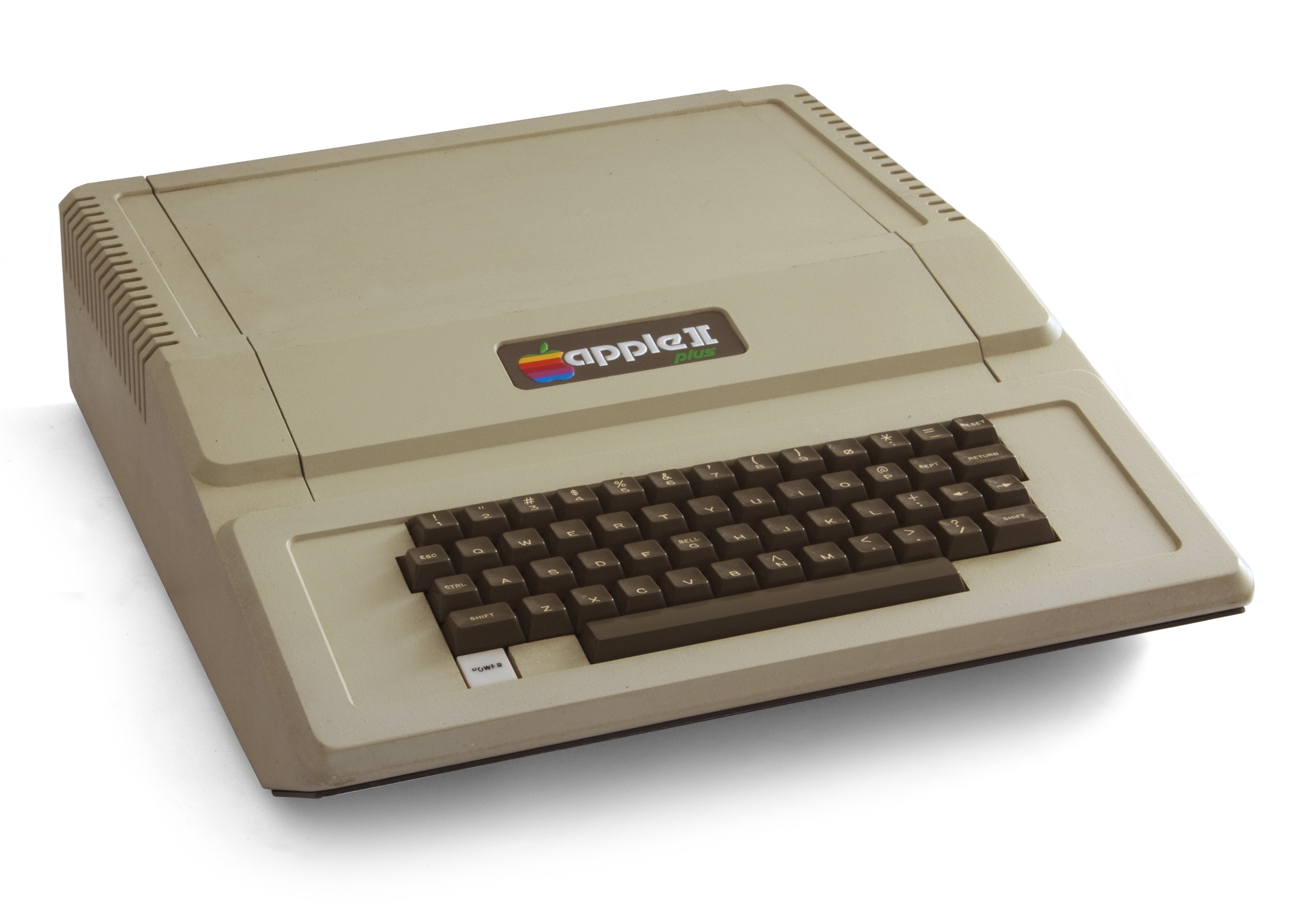
The Apple II, introduced in 1977, became Apple's first commercially successful computer.

The Apple II became Apple's first major commercial success following the 1979 release of VisiCalc, the first widely adopted spreadsheet program and one of the earliest personal computer "killer applications". Initially available exclusively for the Apple II, VisiCalc transformed the computer into a popular business tool and helped establish Apple in the growing personal computer industry.

On December 12, 1980, Apple became a public company through an initial public offering (IPO) on the Nasdaq. The company sold 4.6 million shares at $22 each, raising more than $100 million, the largest IPO since Ford Motor Company's 1956 offering. By the end of the first day of trading, Apple's market capitalization reached $1.778 billion and more than 300 employees and investors became millionaires.

In November and December 1979, Apple employees, including Jobs and Jef Raskin, visited Xerox PARC twice as part of a technology exchange negotiated by Jobs, in which Xerox was granted the right to purchase $1 million of Apple's pre-IPO stock. There they observed the experimental Xerox Alto, which featured a graphical user interface (GUI) navigated with a mouse, that inspired Jobs to incorporate a GUI into Apple's future products. Apple's first GUI-based computer, the Apple Lisa, was introduced in 1983. Although the Lisa was pioneering as a mass-marketed GUI computer, its high price and limited software library resulted in poor sales.

Jobs was removed from the Lisa project during its early development and joined the Macintosh division in 1981. The Macintosh had originally been conceived by Raskin as a low-cost, portable computer, with early contributions from Wozniak. After Wozniak stepped back following a plane crash, Jobs took over the project, transforming the Macintosh into a mouse-driven computer with a GUI similar to the Lisa. Wozniak later speculated that Jobs' rivalry with the Lisa project was the driving force behind this shift in direction. Jobs was also hostile toward the Apple II division, which at the time generated most of the company's revenue.

=== 1984–1991: Success with Macintosh ===
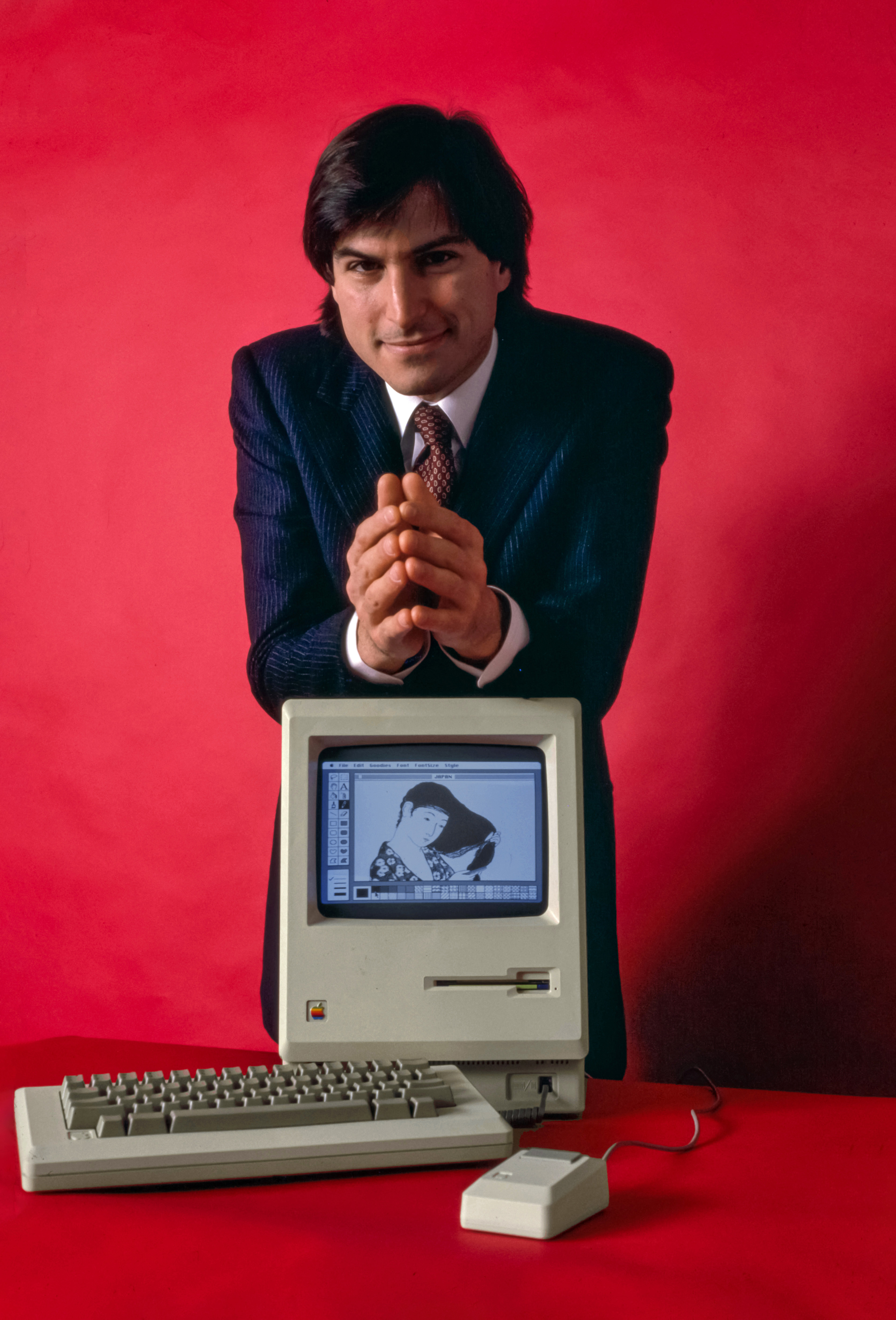
Steve Jobs in 1984 with the Macintosh, the first successful mass-market personal computer to feature an integral graphical user interface and mouse

In 1984, Apple launched the original Macintosh on January 24, 1984, introducing it to the public with "1984", a US$1.5-million television advertisement directed by Ridley Scott that aired during the third quarter of Super Bowl XVIII on January 22, 1984. This was hailed as a watershed event for Apple's success and was called a "masterpiece" by CNN and one of "the greatest TV commercials of all time" by TV Guide. Although initial Macintosh sales were strong, they declined rapidly after the first few months as reviewers criticized its limited 128 KB of RAM, small software library, and relatively high price of $2,495 (equivalent to $7,700 in 2025).

Slow Macintosh sales led to a power struggle between Jobs and chief executive officer John Sculley, whom Jobs had recruited from PepsiCo in 1983. The board of directors instructed Sculley to limit Jobs' ability to launch further expensive forays into untested products. Rather than accept Sculley's direction, Jobs attempted to remove him as chief executive. Jean-Louis Gassée informed Sculley of Jobs' efforts to organize a boardroom coup, prompting an emergency meeting in which Apple's executive staff sided with Sculley. In May 1985, the board stripped Jobs of all operational duties. Jobs resigned from Apple in September 1985 and founded competitor NeXT, taking several Apple employees with him.

Wozniak had already stepped away from day-to-day operations following a 1981 plane crash. He left active employment at Apple in 1985, citing frustration that the company was prioritizing the Macintosh over the Apple II division, which continued to generate a significant portion of Apple's revenue during the mid-1980s. He remained an Apple shareholder and continued to represent the company in a ceremonial capacity.

After the departures of Jobs and Wozniak in 1985, Sculley shifted Apple's focus toward expanding the Macintosh platform and appointed Gassée to lead Macintosh development, placing him in the role previously held by Jobs. That year, Apple introduced the LaserWriter in March, one of the first affordable PostScript-based laser printers, while Aldus Corporation introduced PageMaker in July. The combination of the Macintosh, LaserWriter, and PageMaker helped establish the desktop publishing market.

In March 1987, Apple introduced the Macintosh II, a modular computer with a separate monitor. It was the first Macintosh to support color graphics and feature internal expansion slots, broadening the platform's capabilities beyond the original all-in-one design.

Apple's success in desktop publishing allowed the company to pursue a premium pricing strategy, sometimes referred to as the "high-right policy" because of its position on a price–profitability chart. Under this strategy, Apple focused on higher-margin products rather than competing on price, with executives believing that power users would continue to pay for increased performance and capabilities. The policy was championed by Gassée, who promoted a target Macintosh profit margin of 55 percent. Gassée also opposed proposals to license the Mac OS to other manufacturers.

The strategy propelled apple to be one of the most profitable companies in the world for several years in the mid-1980s.

By 1988, Gassée was viewed by some as a potential successor to Sculley, however, the "high-right policy" he championed began to lose ground as desktop publishing software became available on IBM PC compatible computers that sold at lower prices, eroding Apple's market share. For the first time in the company's history, sales declined in the 1989 holiday season, followed by a 20 percent drop in Apple's stock price. In January 1990, Sculley appointed Michael Spindler as chief operating officer, reducing Gassée's influence. Gassée left Apple at the end of 1990 and founded competitor Be Inc. in 1991, taking several Apple employees with him.

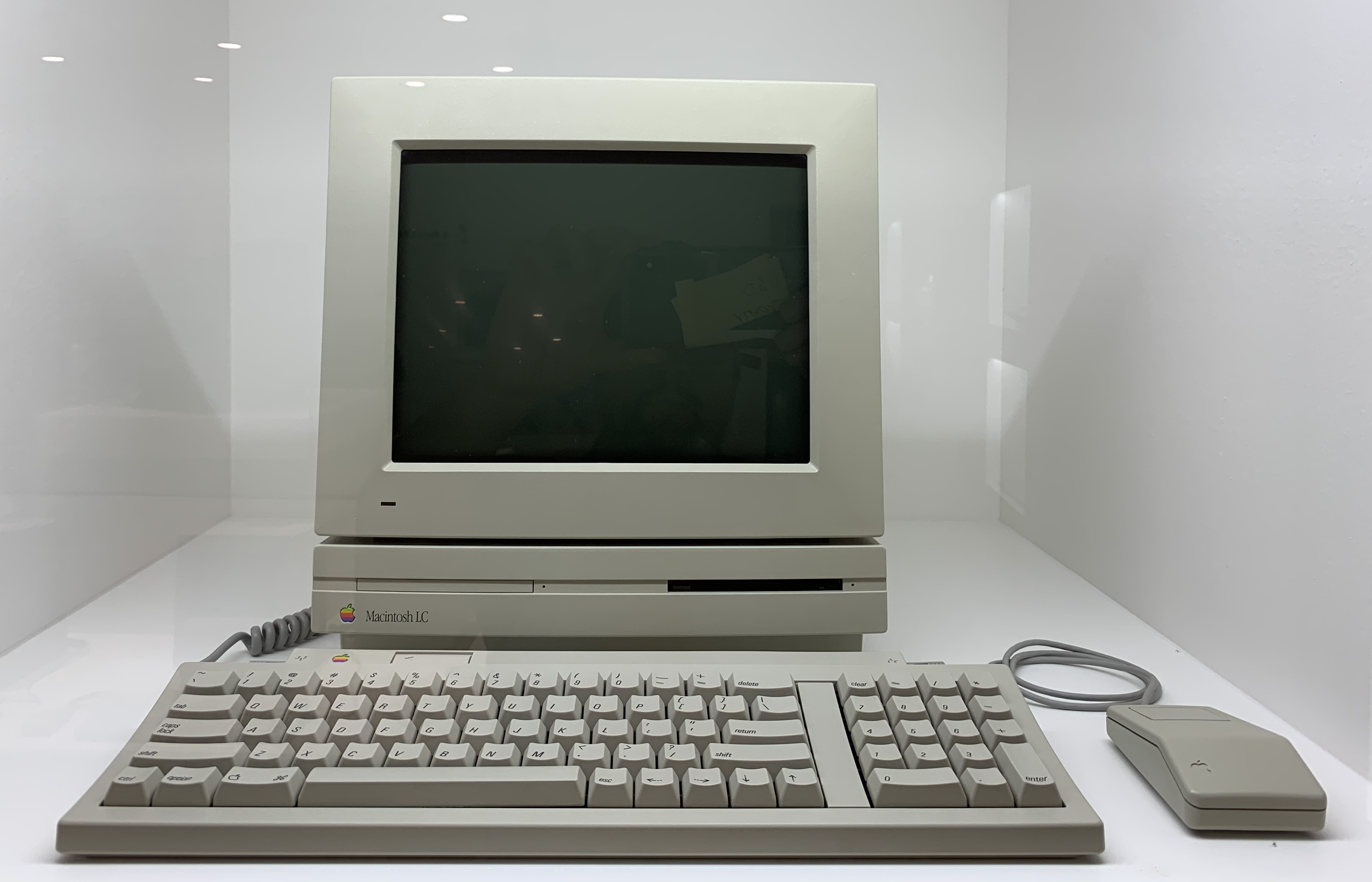
Macintosh LC

The company shifted its product strategy and, in October 1990, introduced three lower-cost models: the Macintosh Classic, LC, and IIsi, all of which sold well. In 1991, Apple introduced the PowerBook line of laptop computers, whose design influenced nearly all future laptops by placing the keyboard behind a built-in pointing device, creating palm rests. The PowerBook was commercially successful, capturing about 40 percent of the notebook computer market during its first year. The same year, Apple introduced System 7, a major upgrade to the Macintosh operating system that introduced a color user interface and improved networking capabilities. The success of the lower-priced Macintosh models and the PowerBook contributed to increased revenue. MacAddict later described the period from 1989 to 1991 as the Macintosh's "first golden age".

=== 1991–1997: Decline and increased competition ===
The success of lower-cost Macintosh models also cannibalized sales of Apple's high-end systems. In response, the company introduced several new product brands, selling largely similar machines at different price points for different markets: the high-end Quadra series, the mid-range Centris, and the consumer-oriented Performa. The overlapping product lines contributed to widespread consumer confusion. Apple discontinued the Apple II in 1993 after encouraging developers and customers to transition to the Macintosh, bringing its longest-running product line to an end.

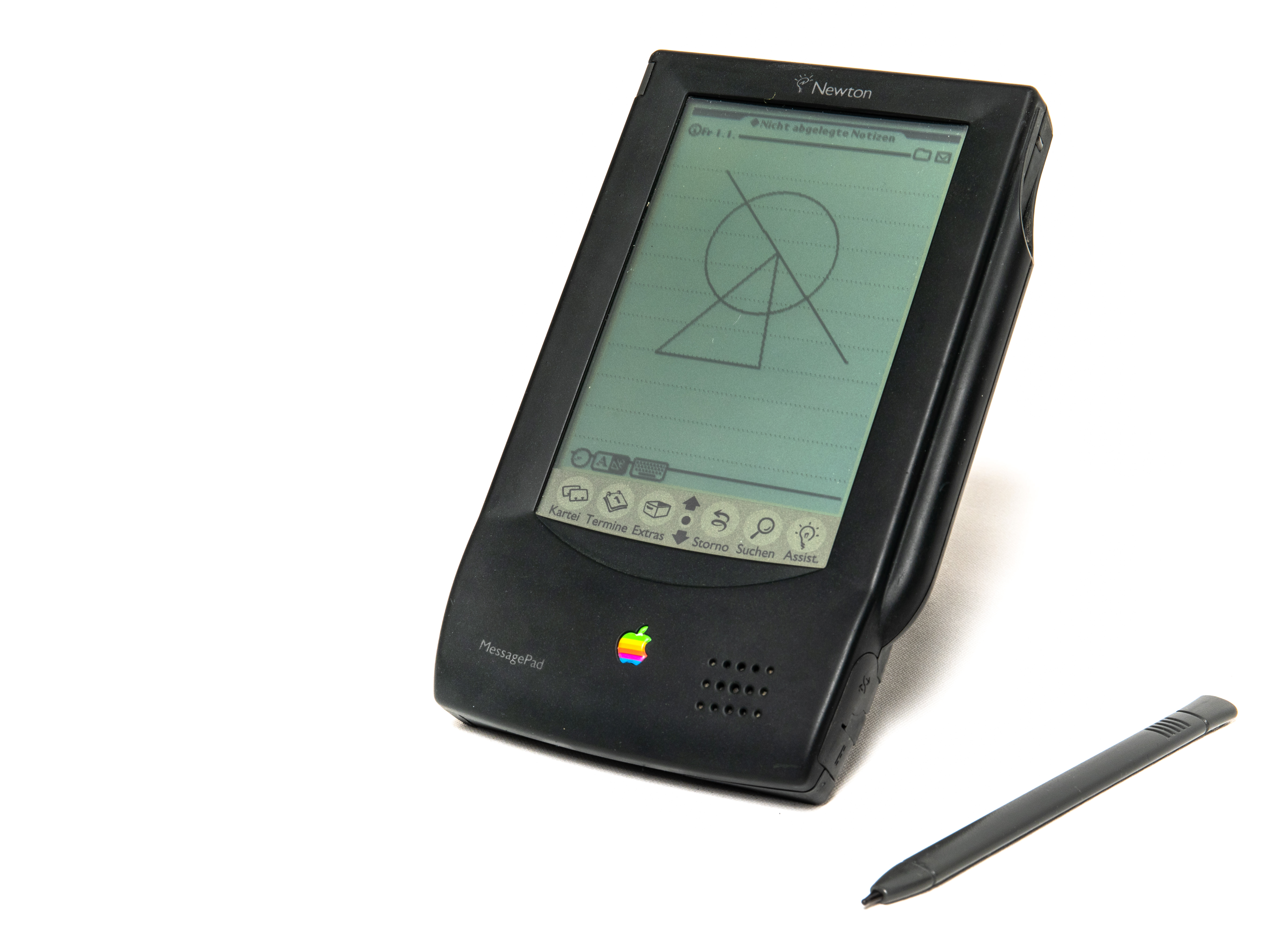
Newton MessagePad with stylus

During the 1990s, Apple branched out beyond computers into consumer electronics and other markets, developing products such as the QuickTake digital cameras, PowerCD, Pippin game console, eWorld online service, Apple Interactive Television Box, and Newton personal digital assistant line. None achieved widespread commercial success.

Meanwhile, Microsoft expanded the reach of Windows by focusing on inexpensive personal computers, while Apple continued to emphasize premium hardware with high profit margins. The resulting loss of market share, along with difficulties in developing new products and operating systems, contributed to declining confidence in Apple's leadership. In 1993, John Sculley was replaced as CEO by Michael Spindler. The board directed Spindler to pursue efforts to sell or merge Apple with another company. Negotiations with IBM, Sun Microsystems, and Philips extended over the rest of Spindler's tenure but failed to produce an agreement.

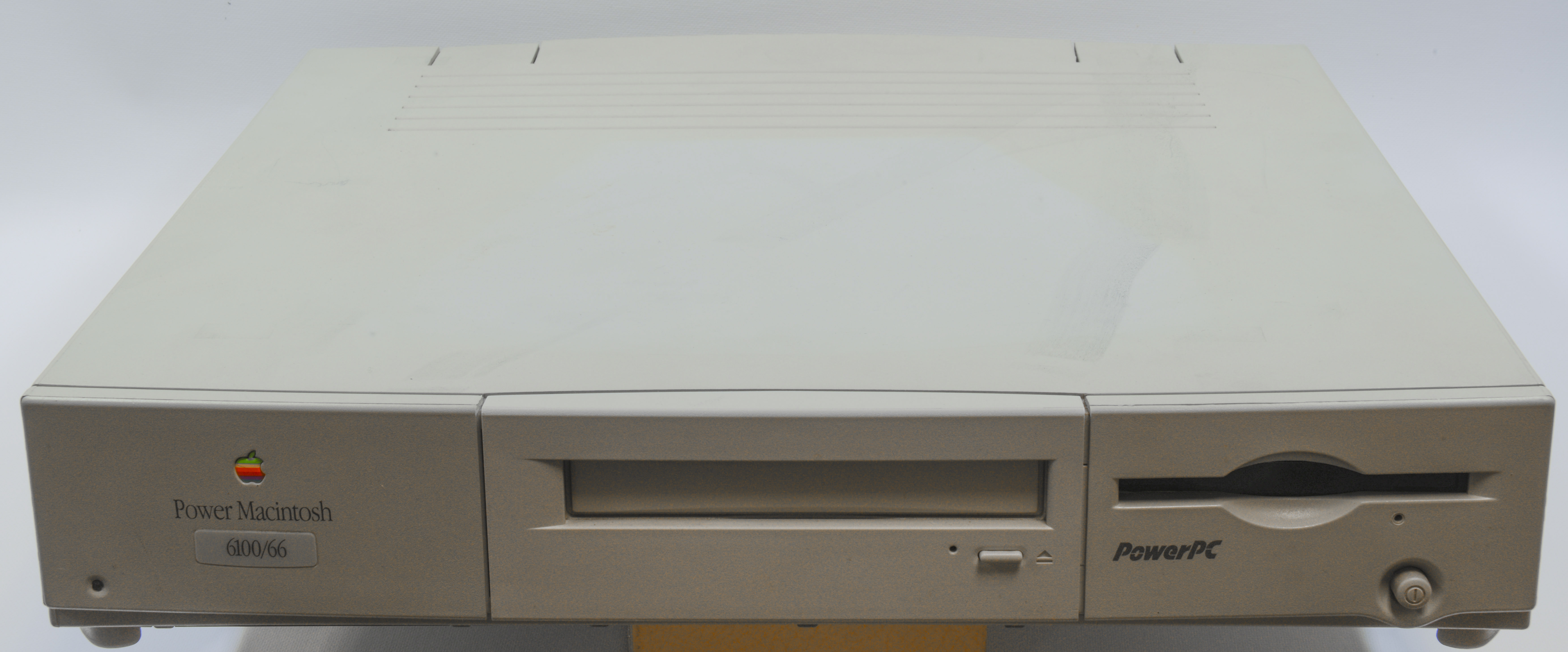
Power Macintosh 6100, one of Apple's first computers with a PowerPC processor, introduced in 1994

In 1991, Apple, IBM, and Motorola had formed the AIM alliance to promote the PowerPC platform. Apple introduced its first three Power Macintosh models using PowerPC processors in 1994, beginning the transition away from the Motorola 68000 series architecture.

In 1994, Apple's lawsuit against Microsoft, filed in 1988 over similarities between Windows and the Lisa operating system, was decided in Microsoft's favor. The following year, Microsoft released Windows 95, which became a commercial success and further increased competitive pressure on Apple.

As part of its efforts to expand the Macintosh platform's market share, Apple began licensing its operating system to other manufacturers, allowing them to produce Macintosh clones. By 1996, however, Apple executives were concerned that the clones were taking sales from the company's own high-end computers, which had higher profit margins, rather than expanding its market share.

Spindler's tenure was also marked by repeated failed attempts to modernize the Macintosh operating system. The original System 1 was not designed for multitasking, or running several applications simultaneously. Although Apple introduced cooperative multitasking in System 5, the company concluded that a more modern operating system was needed. Internal development efforts, including Pink, A/UX, and Copland, did not produce a suitable successor, with Copland falling well behind schedule before being abandoned.

In 1996, Spindler was replaced as CEO by Gil Amelio, who was hired for his reputation as a corporate rehabilitator. Amelio made big changes, including extensive layoffs and cost-cutting. Amelio began evaluating external options to replace the Mac OS, including Microsoft's Windows NT and Sun's Solaris, before entering negotiations to acquire Be Inc. and its BeOS operating system. The talks ultimately collapsed amid disagreements over the company's valuation, with Be seeking substantially more than Apple was willing to pay. Gassée later disputed that the negotiations failed solely over price, stating that disagreements over his prospective role at Apple also contributed to the breakdown.

Apple instead acquired NeXT, the company founded by Steve Jobs, for its NeXTSTEP operating system. Apple purchased NeXT for $427 million in cash, stock, stock options, and assumed debt. At the insistence of Amelio, Jobs accepted 1.5 million Apple shares to lend credibility to the deal and agreed to return to Apple as an advisor.

=== 1997–2007: Restructuring and return to profitability ===
The NeXT acquisition was completed on February 7, 1997. Jobs quickly became frustrated with the leadership of Amelio and Apple's board. In June 1997, he anonymously sold his 1.5 million shares, sending the company's stock price lower and contributing to pressure on Amelio, whom the board ousted the following month. Jobs became Apple's de facto leader and was formally appointed interim CEO on September 16.

In August 1997, Jobs secured a $150 million investment from Microsoft and a commitment to continue developing software for the Mac platform, an agreement widely viewed as beneficial to both companies following Microsoft's antitrust settlement with the US Department of Justice. Jobs ended the Macintosh clone licensing program, and in September 1997, acquired the core assets of the largest clone manufacturer, Power Computing. In November 1997, the online Apple Store launched and adopted a build-to-order manufacturing model similar to that used by Dell. By the end of 1997, Jobs had returned Apple to profitability, reporting a profit of $309 million.

The 'four-quadrant' devices

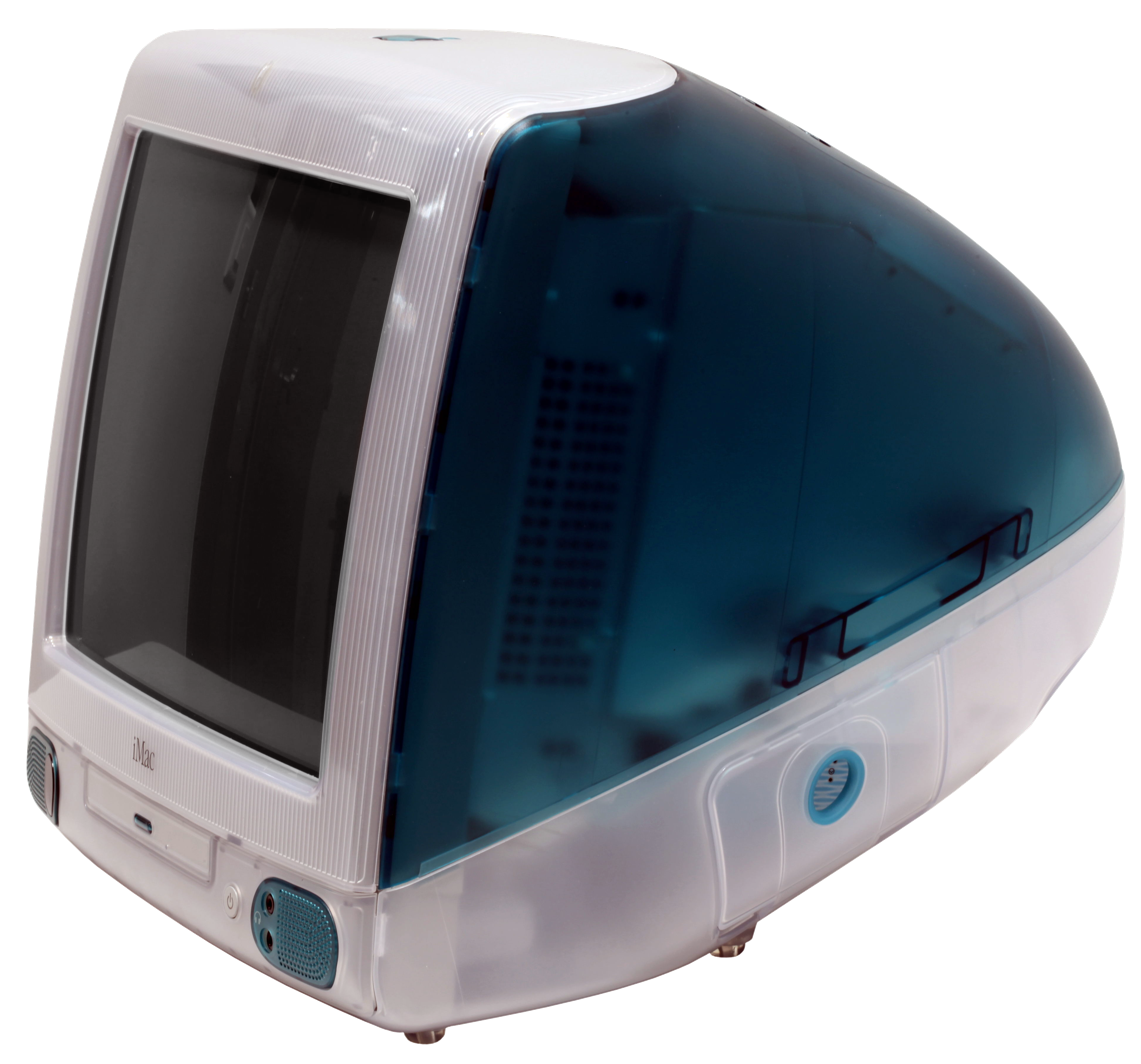
iMac

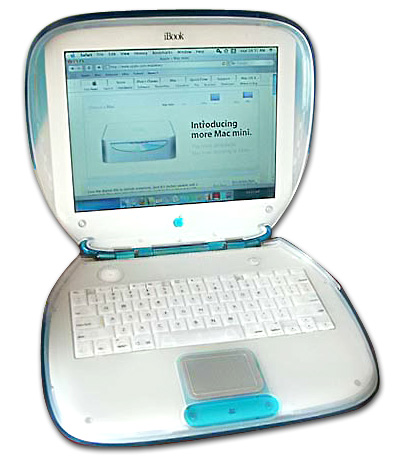
iBook

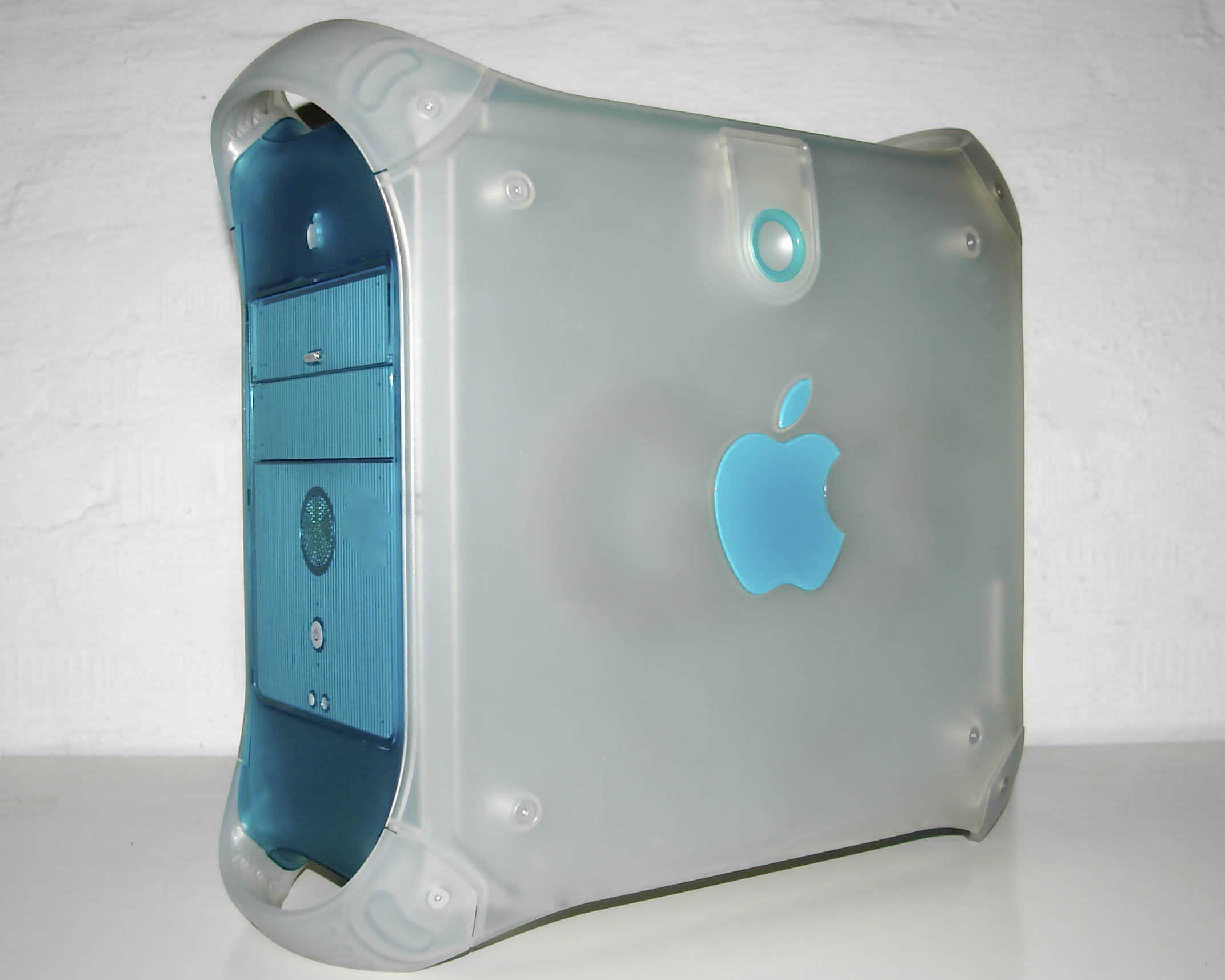
Power Macintosh G3

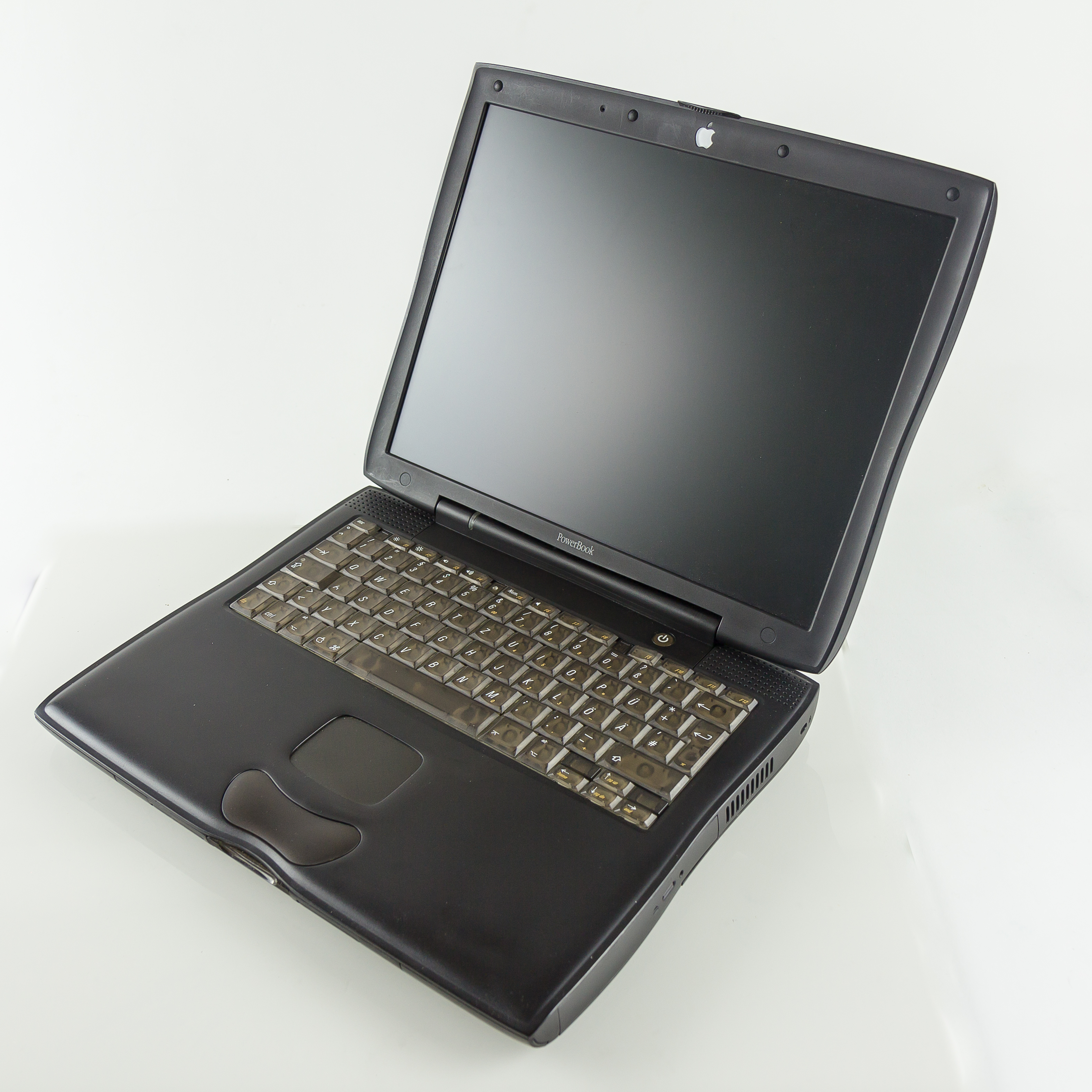
PowerBook G3

Jobs streamlined Apple's product lineup, eliminating roughly 70 percent of existing models and introducing a simplified 'four-quadrant' product strategy consisting of one desktop and one laptop computer each for consumer and professional markets. The restructuring eliminated approximately 3,000 jobs.

The first all-new product introduced under this strategy was the iMac, unveiled on May 6, 1998. Designed by Jony Ive, the all-in-one computer featured a distinctive translucent design enclosure, emphasized Internet connectivity (the "i" in iMac), adopted modern technologies such as USB, and omitted legacy technologies like the floppy disk drive. It sold approximately 800,000 units within its first five months on the market.

Apple completed the transition to the four-quadrant lineup on July 21, 1999, with the introduction of the consumer-oriented iBook laptop. It joined the iMac and updated G3-powered versions of the professional Power Macintosh desktop and PowerBook laptop, completing the simplified product matrix. Jobs said the smaller product lineup allowed Apple to focus more on quality and innovation.

During this period, Apple also focused on building an ecosystem around digital media, similar to its earlier efforts in desktop publishing, through a series of acquisitions and product launches. Apple acquired Macromedia's Key Grip digital video editing project, which became Final Cut Pro in April 1999. The technology also contributed to the development of iMovie, Apple's consumer video-editing application, released in October 1999. In April 2000, Apple acquired German company Astarte, whose DVDirector DVD authoring software was repackaged as DVD Studio Pro for professionals and adapted into iDVD for consumers. Later that year, Apple acquired SoundJam MP from Casady & Greene and relaunched it as iTunes, adding a simplified interface and CD-burning capabilities.

In 2001, Apple made three announcements that would shape its future direction. On March 24, Apple released Mac OS X, its next-generation operating system after years of failed attempts to modernize the classic Mac OS. Based on NeXTSTEP, Mac OS X combined a stable, reliable, and secure Unix foundation with a redesigned GUI. In May, Apple opened its first two Apple Store retail locations in McLean, Virginia, and Glendale, California, providing controlled spaces to showcase its products and services. Despite skepticism that it would be able to compete as a retailer, the stores succeeded, and Apple expanded to more than 500 locations worldwide. On November 10, Apple released the iPod, its first major consumer product outside the computer market in years. The portable digital audio player became a major success, selling more than 100 million units within six years.

In 2002, Apple acquired Nothing Real for its digital compositing application Shake, and Emagic, developer of the music production software Logic. The acquisition made Apple the first computer manufacturer to own a music software company and was followed by the development of the consumer-oriented GarageBand application. In 2002, Apple also introduced iPhoto, completing the iLife software suite.

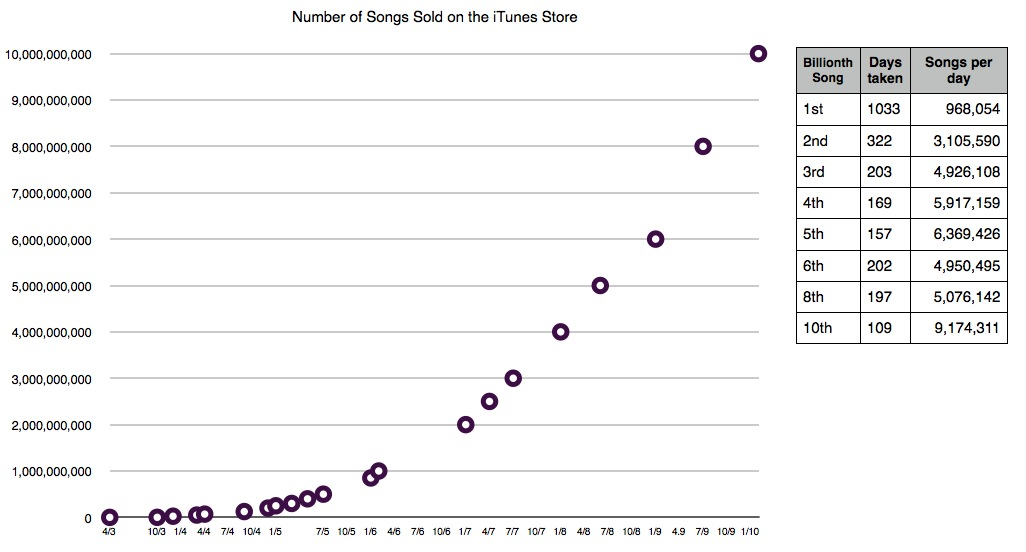
The iTunes Store was highly successful in shaping the legal music downloading industry; chart shows the number of songs sold from 2003 to 2010.

In 2003, Apple launched the iTunes Store, allowing customers to purchase and download music for 99¢ per song. The service quickly became the leading online music retailer, reaching more than 5 billion downloads by June 2008 and becoming the world's largest music retailer two years later. The iTunes Store helped transform the music industry by shifting consumers from unauthorized file-sharing services such as Napster toward paid digital distribution.

In January 2005, Apple introduced the Mac Mini, a low-cost computer intended to attract Windows users. It was priced starting at US$499 (equivalent to $800 in 2025) with users expected to re-use their existing display, keyboard, and mouse.

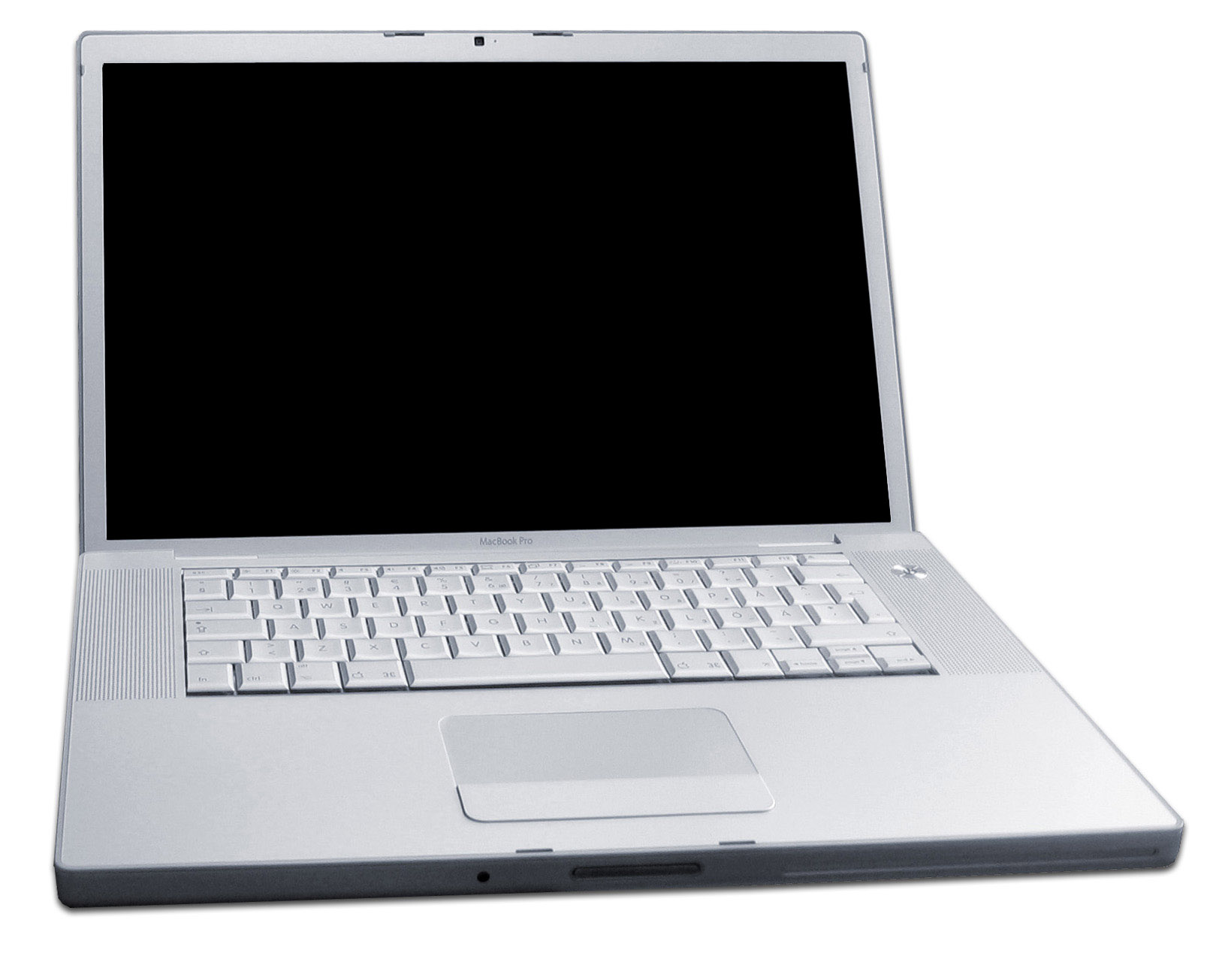
MacBook Pro, Apple's first laptop with an Intel processor, introduced in 2006

At the Worldwide Developers Conference on June 6, 2005, Jobs announced that Apple would transition the Mac from PowerPC to Intel processors over the following two years. The first Intel-based Macs, the MacBook Pro and iMac, were introduced on January 10, 2006, using Intel's Core Duo processors. Apple completed the transition on August 7, 2006, approximately one year ahead of its announced schedule. During the transition, the Power Mac, iBook, and PowerBook brands were retired and replaced by the Mac Pro, MacBook, and MacBook Pro. Apple also introduced Boot Camp in 2006, allowing users to install Windows on Intel-based Macs alongside Mac OS X.

Between 2003 and 2006, the price of Apple's stock increased more than tenfold, from around $6 per share (split-adjusted) to over $80. When Apple surpassed Dell's market cap in January 2006, Jobs sent an email to Apple employees saying Michael Dell should eat his words, referencing his 1997 remark that, if he ran Apple, he would "shut it down and give the money back to the shareholders".

=== 2007–2011: Success with mobile devices ===
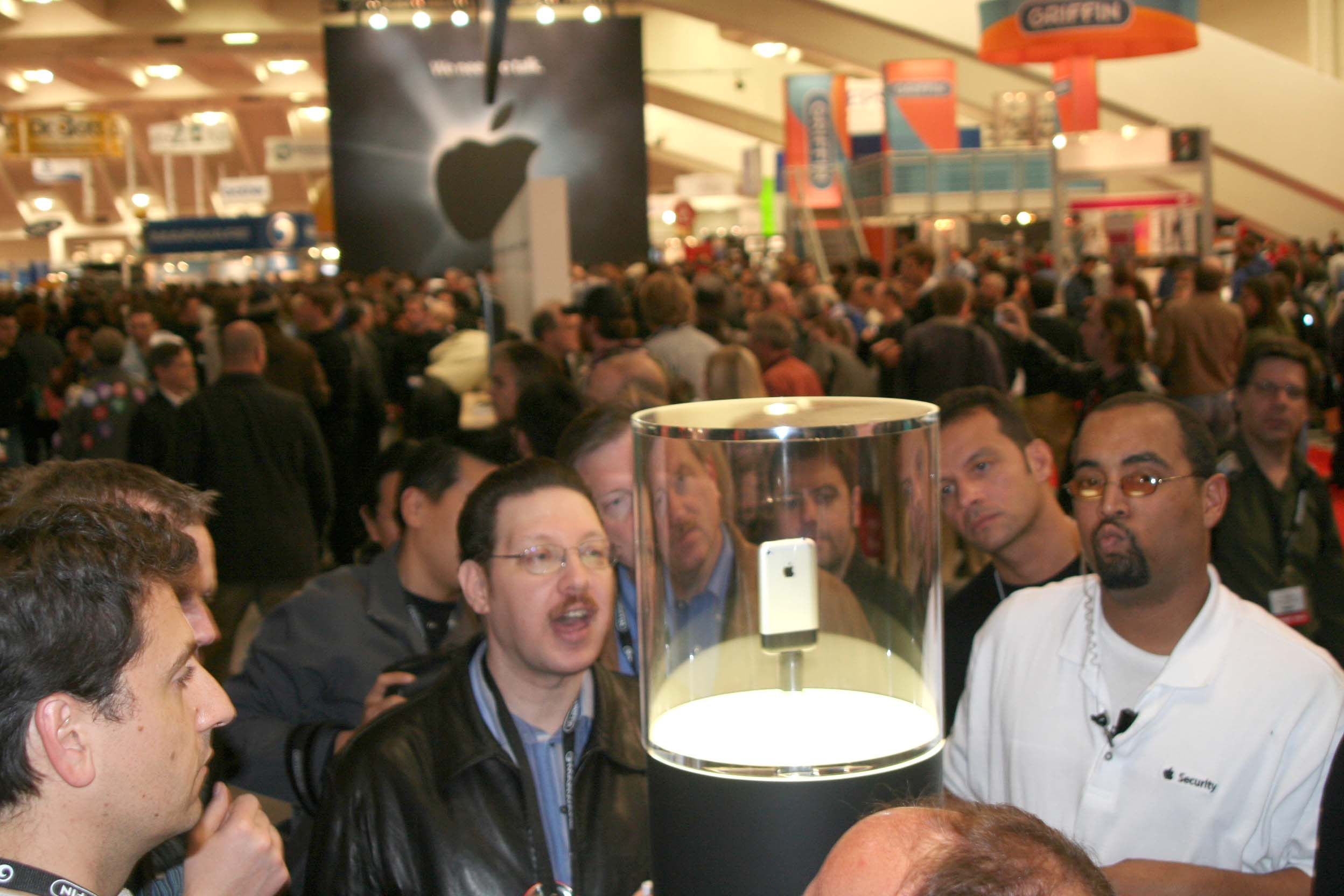
The newly announced first-generation iPhone was on display at the 2007 Macworld Expo.

During his keynote at the Macworld Expo on January 9, 2007, Jobs announced that Apple Computer, Inc. would be renamed Apple Inc. to reflect the company's expanded focus on consumer electronics. He also introduced the Apple TV and the iPhone. The iPhone had been developed in secret since 2005 and was the subject of widespread speculation before its introduction. Jobs presented it as a device that combined the functions of an iPod, a mobile phone, and an Internet communications device. Unlike most contemporary mobile phones, it used a finger-operated multi-touch interface and eliminated most physical buttons. Released in the United States on June 29, 2007, the iPhone sold 270,000 units within 30 hours of release.

In an open letter published on February 6, 2007, Jobs said Apple favored selling music on the iTunes Store without FairPlay, its digital rights management (DRM) technology, if record labels agreed to remove DRM from their music catalogs. On April 2, 2007, EMI announced that DRM would be removed from its catalog beginning in May 2007. Other record labels later followed suit, and Apple announced in January 2009 that all songs were available without DRM.

In July 2008, Apple launched the App Store for third-party iPhone applications. Within a month, the store had sold 60 million applications and generated average daily revenue of $1 million. Jobs said the App Store could become a billion-dollar business for Apple.

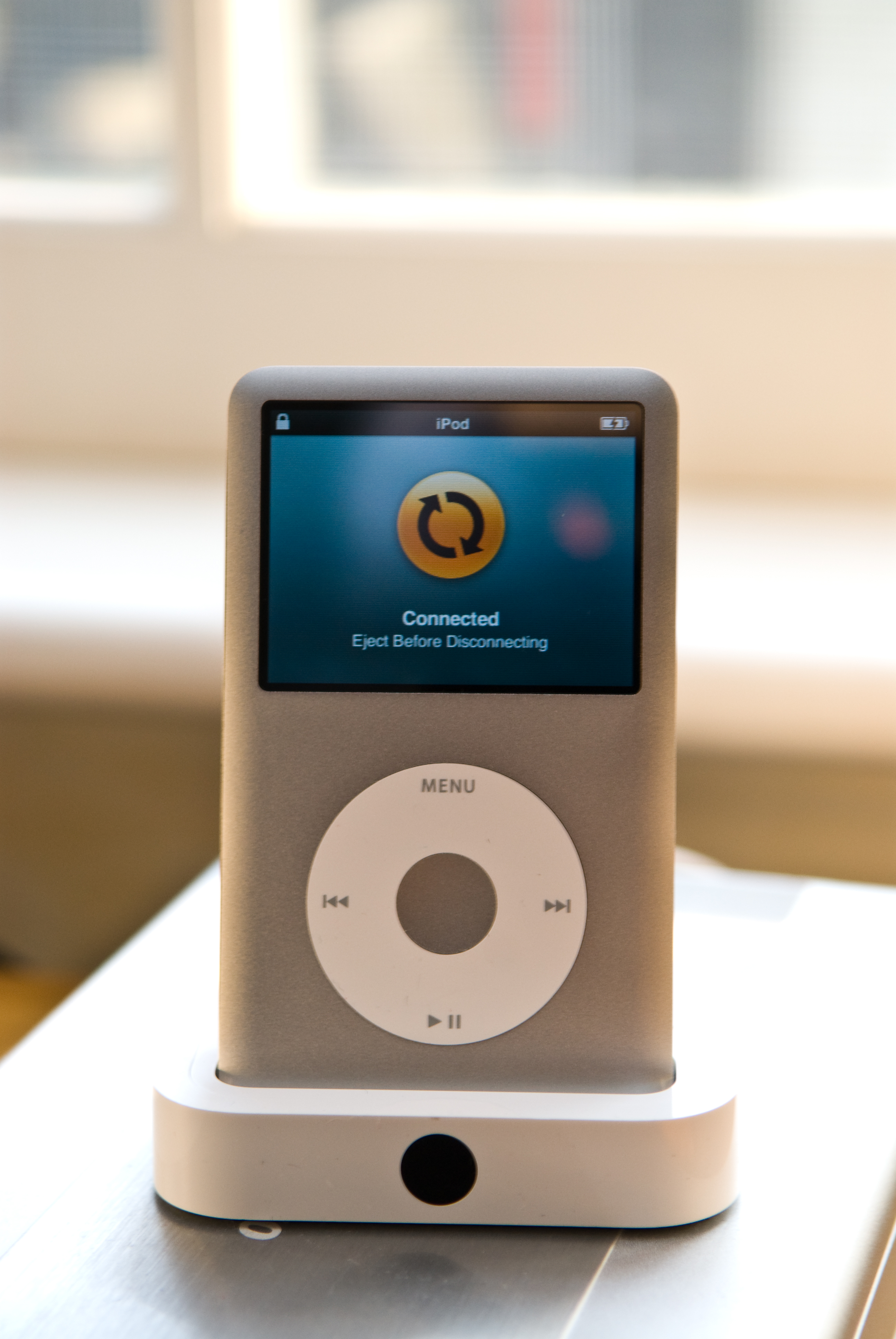
A docked iPod Classic; Apple worked with other manufacturers to implement purpose-built "Made for iPod" docking stations.

On January 14, 2009, Jobs announced that he would take a six-month medical leave of absence through the end of June to focus on his health. During his absence, Apple reported revenue of $8.16 billion and profit of $1.21 billion for its first fiscal quarter of 2009.

Apple introduced the iPad on January 27, 2010. It ran the same touch-based operating system as the iPhone and supported existing iPhone applications. Released in the United States on April 3, 2010, the iPad sold more than 300,000 units on its first day and more than 500,000 during its first week. In May 2010, Apple's market capitalization exceeded Microsoft's for the first time since 1989.

On January 17, 2011, Jobs announced in an internal Apple memo that he would take another indefinite medical leave to focus on his health. Chief operating officer Tim Cook assumed responsibility for Apple's day-to-day operations while Jobs remained involved in major strategic decisions. In June 2011, Jobs introduced iCloud, an online storage and synchronization service that replaced MobileMe. It was the last Apple product launch presented by Jobs before his death.

On August 24, 2011, Jobs resigned as Apple's chief executive officer because of his health. Cook succeeded him as CEO, and Jobs became chairman of Apple, a new position at the company. Arthur Levinson succeeded Jobs as chairman in November 2011 following Jobs' death.

=== 2011–2020: Post-Jobs era, new devices ===
On October 5, 2011, Steve Jobs died. That same month, Apple released the iPhone 4s, which introduced Siri, an intelligent software assistant built into iOS. On August 20, 2012, Apple's rising stock price increased the company's market capitalization to a then-record $624 billion. This beat the non-inflation-adjusted record for market capitalization previously set by Microsoft in 1999.

In May 2014, Apple announced it would acquire Dr. Dre and Jimmy Iovine's company Beats Electronics, the producer of the "Beats by Dr. Dre" headphone line and operator of the Beats Music streaming service, for US$3 billion. It was the largest acquisition in Apple's history at the time. At WWDC in June 2015, Apple launched Apple Music, a subscription streaming service built on the Beats acquisition.

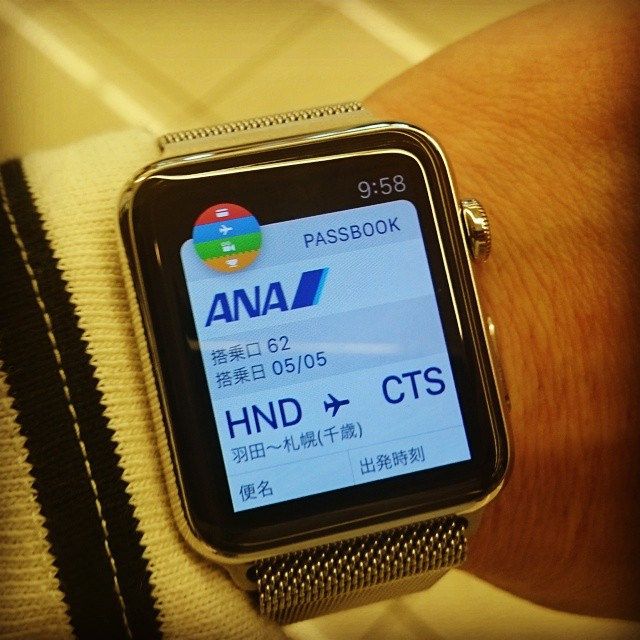
First-generation Apple Watch (2015)

During a press event on September 9, 2014, Apple introduced the Apple Watch, its first smartwatch. Apple initially marketed the device as a fashion accessory and a companion to the iPhone, before shifting its focus toward health and fitness features to compete with dedicated activity trackers.

In September 2017, Apple released the iPhone X, which replaced the physical home button with an edge-to-edge display and introduced Face ID, a facial-recognition system that replaced Touch ID as the phone's unlock method. The design set the template for subsequent iPhone models. That same year, in June 2017, Apple announced HomePod, its first smart speaker, aimed at competing with Sonos, Google Home, and Amazon Echo.

Also in 2017, Apple formed a video unit to produce original television series and films, later marketed as Apple TV, and in June 2018, Apple signed the Writers Guild of America's minimum basic agreement.

On August 19, 2020, Apple's share price briefly topped $467.77, making it the first US company with a market capitalization of US$2 trillion.

=== 2020–2026: Transition to Apple silicon ===
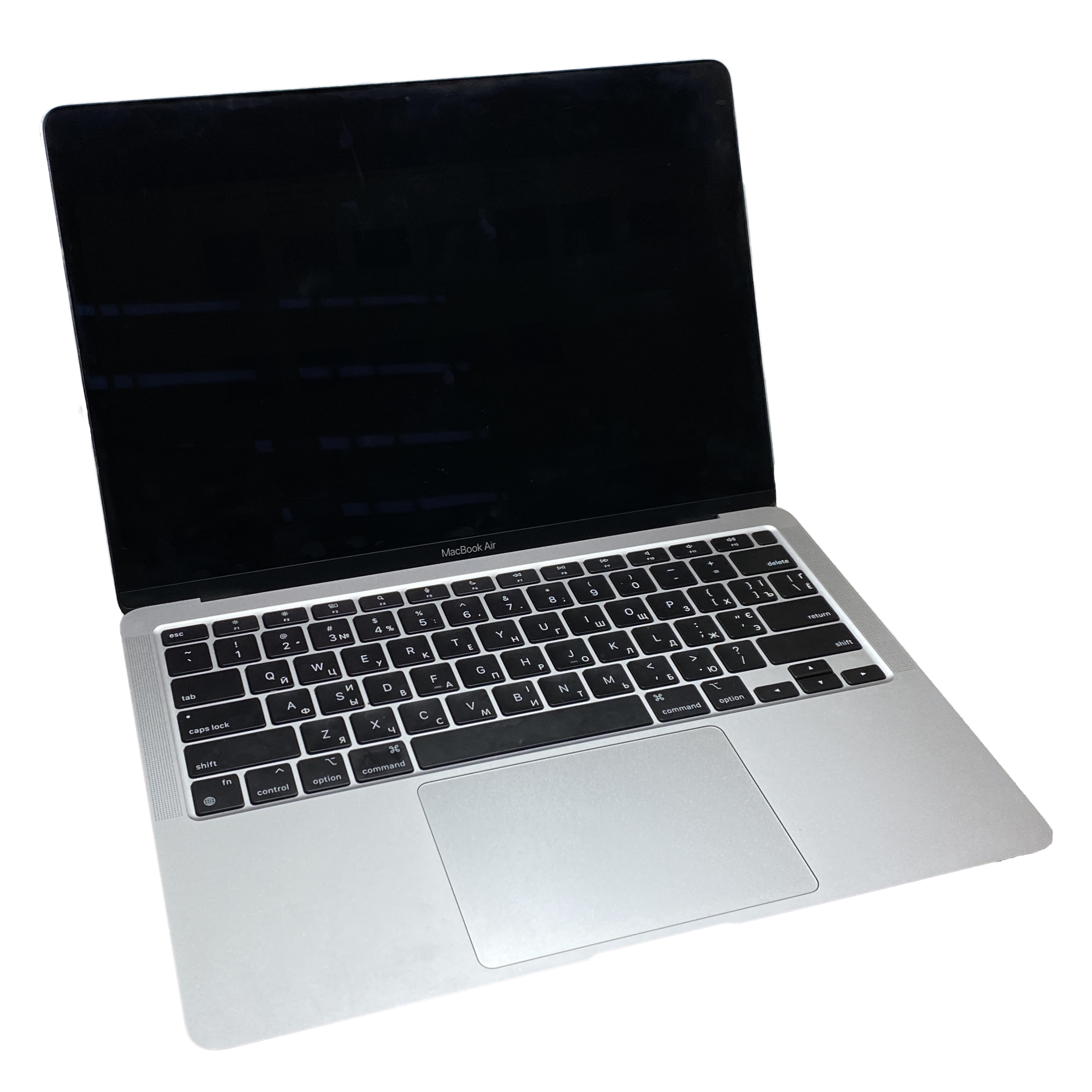
MacBook Air, one of Apple's first laptops with an ARM-based processor, introduced in 2020

Apple announced its transition away from Intel processors to Apple-designed silicon at WWDC in 2020. The first Macs powered by the M1 chip were introduced later that year, with the company highlighting their improved performance and energy efficiency. The transition to Apple-designed processors also reduced the company's dependence on external suppliers during the global semiconductor shortage.

In March 2022, Apple TV+'s CODA won the Academy Award for Best Picture, making it the first film distributed by a streaming service to win the award.

In June 2023, Apple announced the Vision Pro, a mixed-reality headset. It was released in February 2024.

In January 2024, Apple responded to Digital Markets Act regulations by allowing users within the European Union to use alternative app stores, alternative payment methods within apps, and choose alternative web browsers on devices.

At WWDC 2024, Apple introduced Apple Intelligence, a suite of artificial intelligence (AI) features integrated across its operating systems.

In 2025, Apple announced plans to invest more than US$500 billion in the United States over four years, including expanded manufacturing, research, and AI infrastructure. At WWDC 2025, the company introduced the Liquid Glass design language across its operating systems.

=== 2026–present: John Ternus era ===
On September 1, 2026, Tim Cook stepped down as CEO after 15 years in the role, transitioning to executive chairman of the company's board of directors. John Ternus succeeded him as CEO. At the same time, Arthur Levinson, who had served as board chairman for 15 years, became lead independent director.

On November 10, 2026, Apple announced that they are shutting down the Apple Support Community Forums on November 20 after 28 years of operation, while the company made the forums read-only.

== Products ==
Since the company's founding and into the early 2000s, Apple primarily sold computers, marketed under the Macintosh brand since the mid-1980s. Since the early 2000s, the company has expanded beyond personal computers, beginning with the now-discontinued iPod (2001), followed by the iPhone (2007) and iPad (2010). The company also sells products that it categorizes as "Wearables, Home and Accessories", including the Apple Watch, Apple TV, AirPods, HomePod, and Apple Vision Pro. Since 2019, Apple has increasingly emphasized its services business.

Commentators have described Apple devices as forming a cohesive ecosystem when used together, while criticizing them for reduced functionality or fewer available features when used with competing devices and for relying on Apple's proprietary features, software, and services—an approach often described as a "walled garden". Cory Doctorow, a Canadian intellectual property researcher and activist, has described Apple's practice of promoting interoperability among its own products while reducing functionality when used with competing devices as an anti-competitive practice.

=== Mac ===
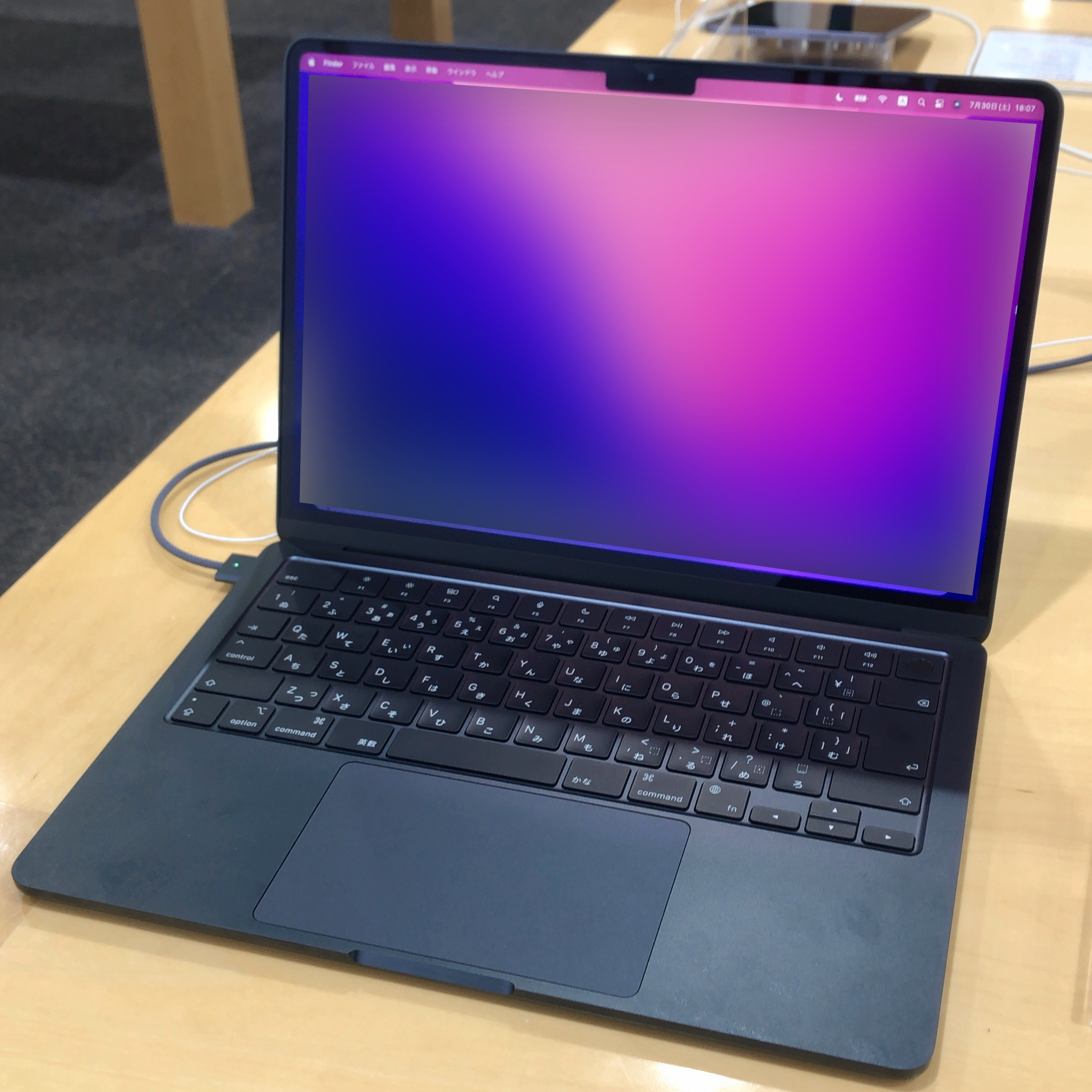
MacBook Air, consumer ultra-thin notebook computer

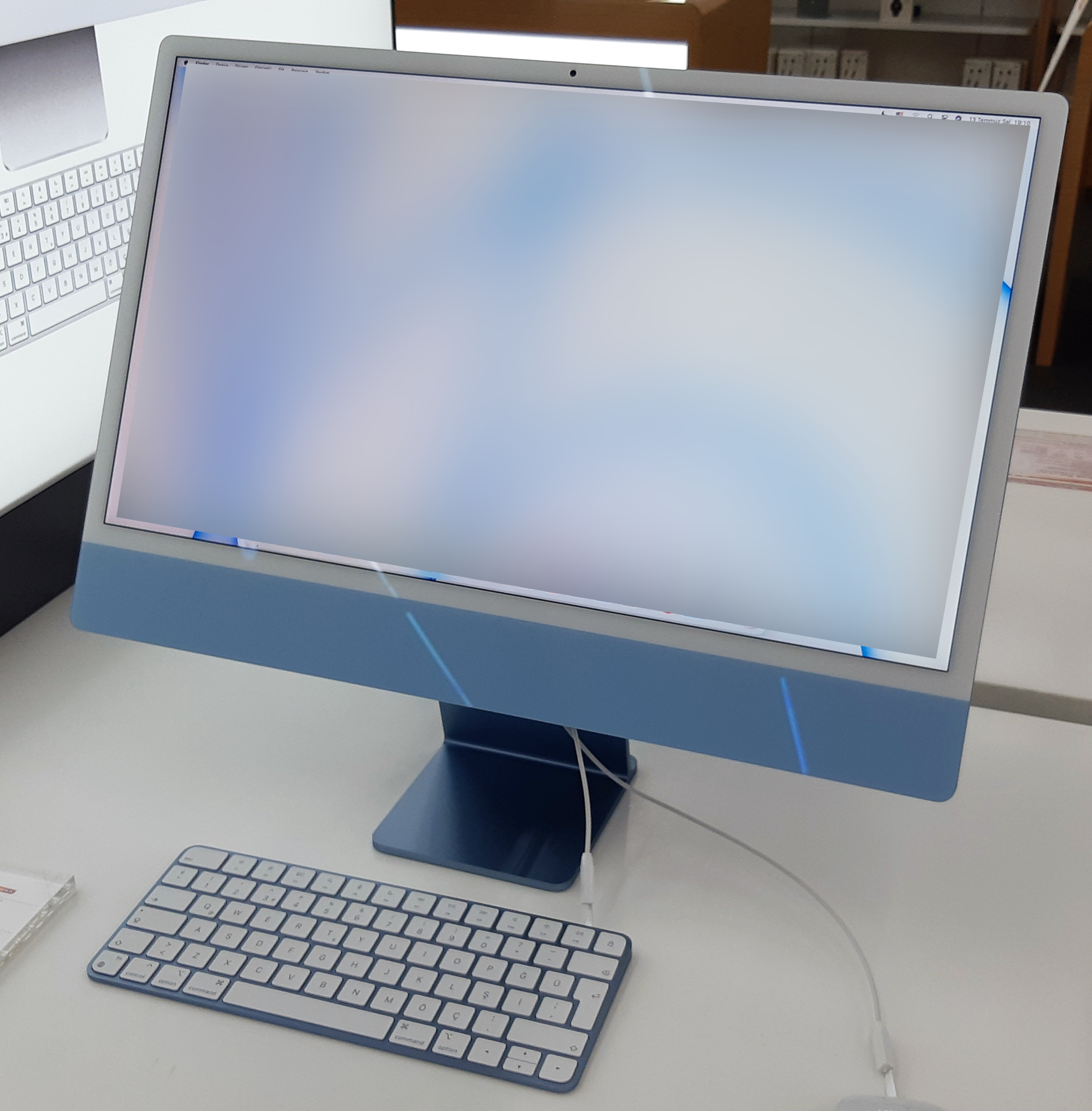
iMac, consumer all-in-one desktop computer

Mac, short for Macintosh, is Apple's line of personal computers that run the company's macOS operating system. Personal computers were Apple's original business line, but as of the end of 2025 they account for only about eight percent of the company's revenue.

Apple currently produces six Mac families:

- iMac – Consumer all-in-one desktop computer, introduced in 1998.
- Mac Mini – Consumer small form factor desktop computer, introduced in 2005.
- MacBook Pro – Professional notebook computer, introduced in 2006.
- MacBook Air – Consumer ultra-thin notebook computer, introduced in 2008.
- Mac Studio – Professional small form factor desktop computer, introduced in 2022.
- MacBook Neo – Consumer low-cost notebook computer, introduced in 2026.

Unlike most other personal computer manufacturers, Apple controls nearly every aspect of the Mac platform, developing its own Apple silicon processors, the macOS operating system, and bundled applications including Safari, iMovie, GarageBand, and the iWork productivity suite. Apple also develops and sells professional applications including Final Cut Pro, Logic Pro, and Xcode.

=== iPhone ===
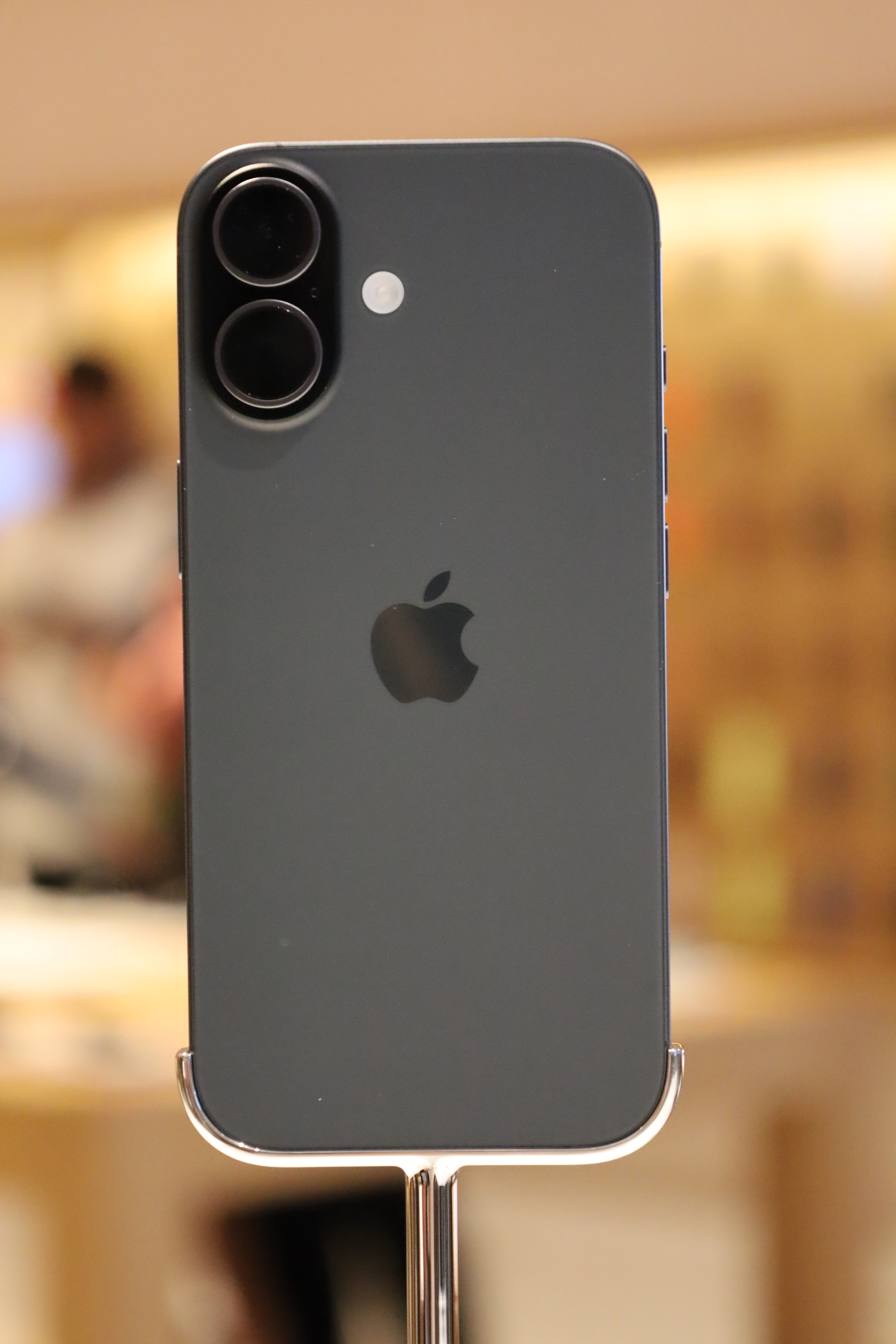
Backside of an iPhone 17

The iPhone is Apple's line of smartphones, which run the company's iOS operating system. The first iPhone was unveiled by Steve Jobs on January 9, 2007. Since then, new iPhone models have been released every year. When it was introduced, its multi-touch screen was described as "revolutionary" and a "game-changer" for the mobile phone industry. The device has been credited with creating the app economy.

iOS is one of the two major smartphone platforms in the world, alongside Android. The iPhone has generated large profits for the company, and is credited with helping to make Apple one of the world's most valuable publicly traded companies. As of the end of 2025, the iPhone accounts for over half of the company's revenue.

=== iPad ===
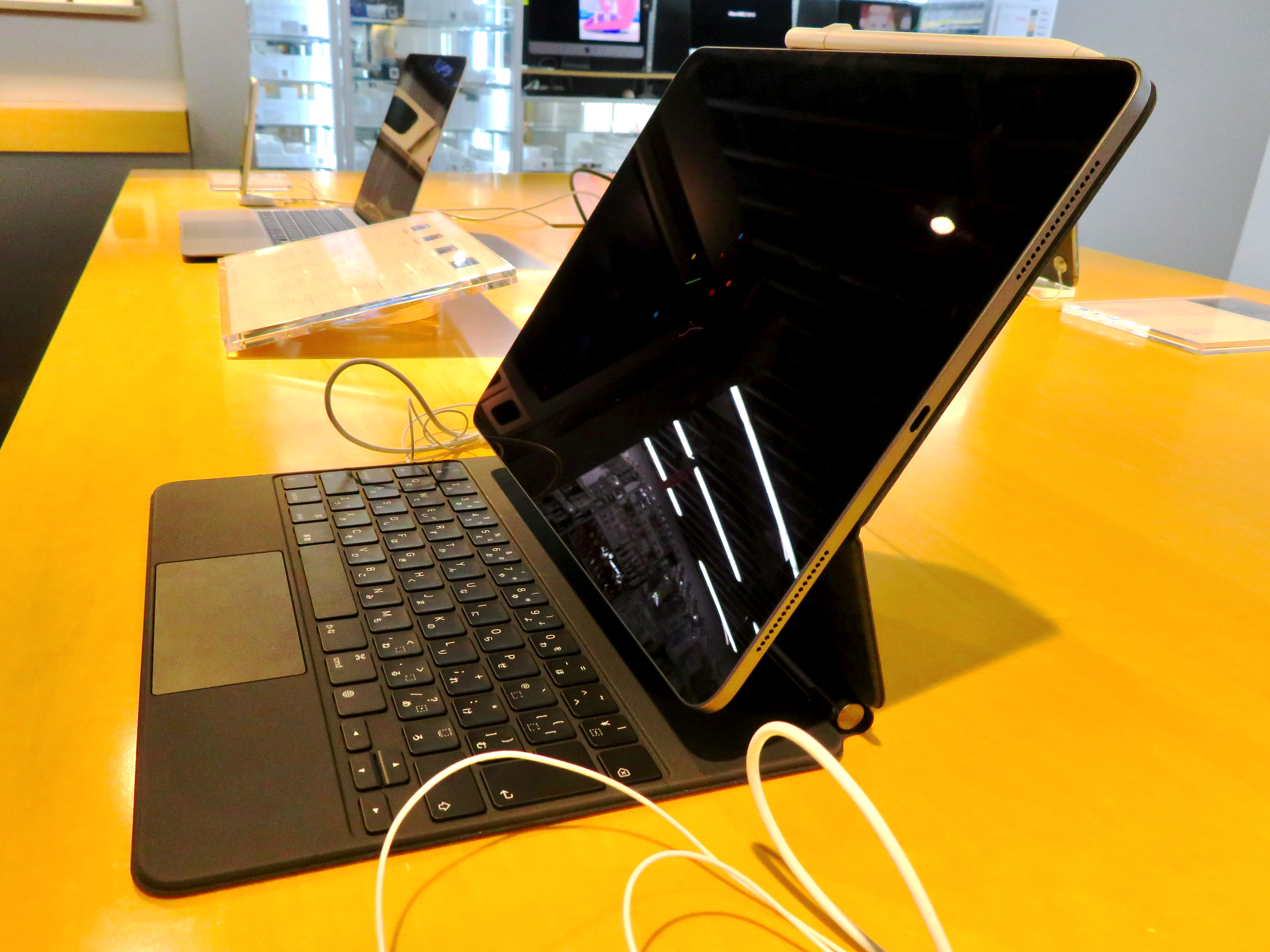
The 2020 iPad Pro on display

The iPad is Apple's line of tablets, which run the company's iPadOS operating system. The first-generation iPad was announced on January 27, 2010. The iPad is mainly marketed for consuming multimedia, creating art, working on documents, videoconferencing, and playing games. The iPad lineup consists of several base iPad models, and the smaller iPad Mini, upgraded iPad Air, and high-end iPad Pro. Apple has consistently improved the iPad's performance, with the iPad Pro adopting the same M-series chips as the Mac, though the iPad continues to receive criticism for its limited OS.

As of September 2020, Apple had sold more than 500 million iPads, though sales peaked in 2013. The iPad remains the most popular tablet computer by sales as of the second quarter of 2020, and accounted for seven percent of the company's revenue as of the end of 2025.

=== Other products ===
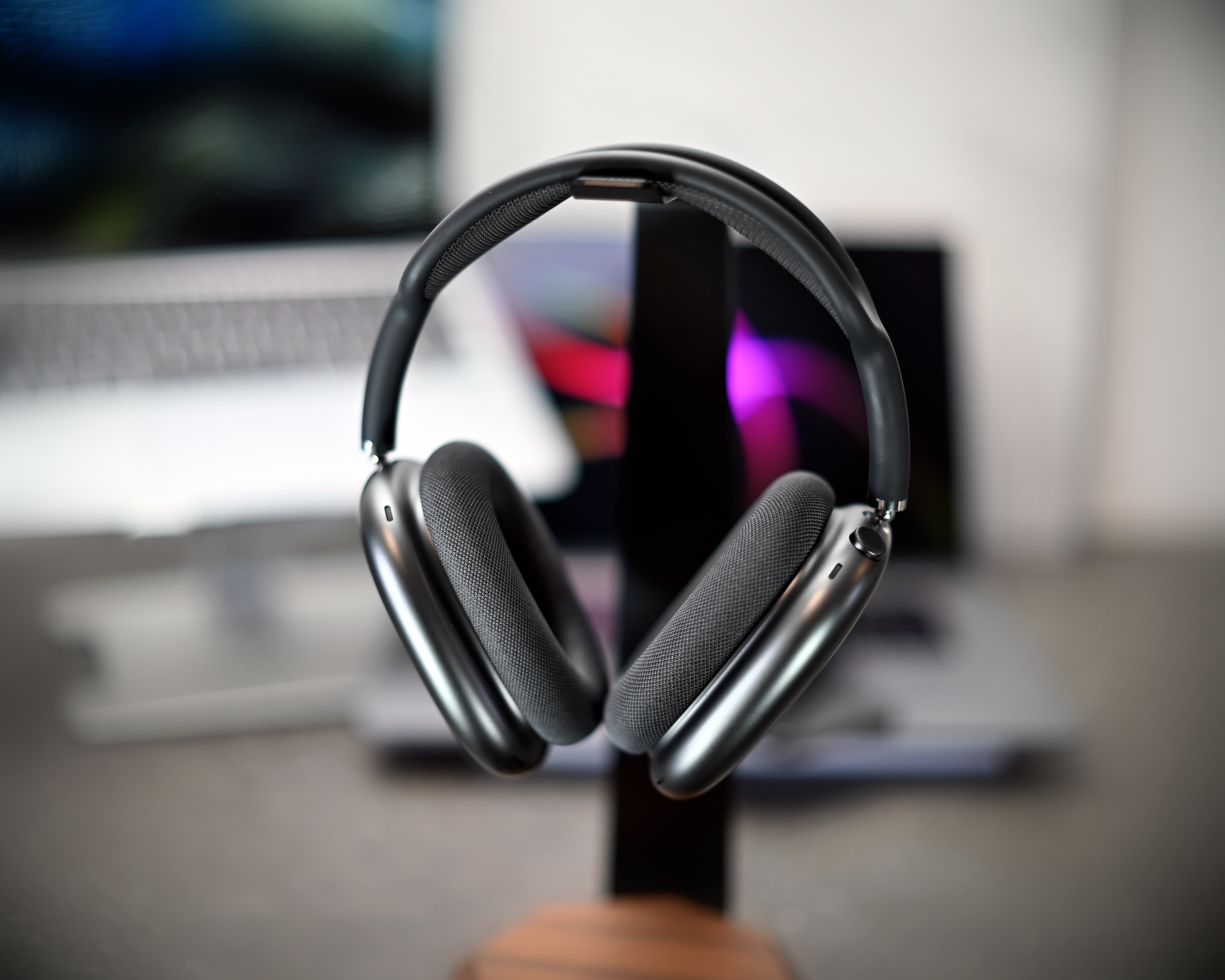
AirPods Max

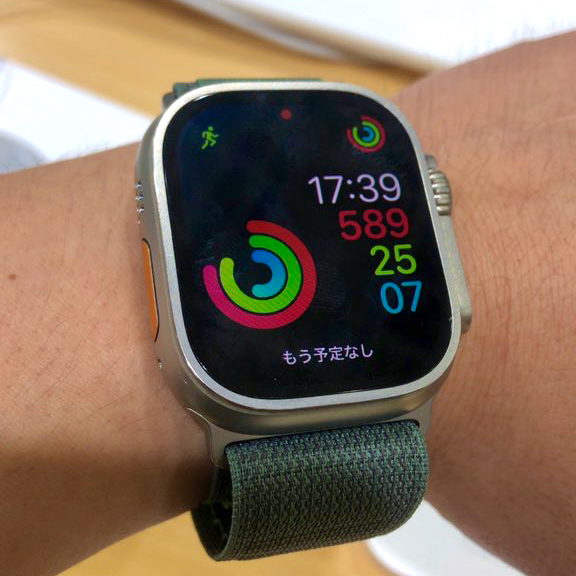
Apple Watch Ultra

Apple makes several other products that it categorizes as "Wearables, Home and Accessories". These products include the AirPods line of wireless headphones, Apple TV digital media players, Apple Watch smartwatches, Beats headphones, HomePod and HomeView smart speakers, and the Vision Pro mixed reality headset. As of the end of 2025, this broad line of products comprises about nine percent of the company's revenues.

=== Services ===
Apple also generates revenue from a range of services, including commissions from the App Store on app sales and in-app purchases, extended warranties through AppleCare+, cloud storage through iCloud+, and payment services through the Apple Card credit card and Apple Pay platform. The company also provides digital content services, including Apple Books, Apple Fitness+, Apple Music, Apple News, Apple TV, and the iTunes Store. Apple One bundles several of these services into a single subscription. Since 2019, Apple has placed greater emphasis on expanding its services business as a source of recurring revenue. As of the end of 2025, services comprise about 26% of the company's revenue.

== Marketing ==
=== Branding ===
The original official logo of Apple was used from 1977 to 1999.

According to Steve Jobs, the company's name was inspired by his visit to an apple farm while on a fruitarian diet. Apple's first logo, designed by Ron Wayne, depicts Sir Isaac Newton sitting under an apple tree. It was replaced in 1977 by a rainbow-colored silhouette of an apple with a bite taken out of it, designed by Rob Janoff.

On August 27, 1999, Apple dropped the rainbow scheme and began using single-color logos nearly identical in shape to the previous incarnation. An Aqua-themed version of the logo was used from 1997 until 2003, and a glass-themed version from 2007 until 2013.

Guy Kawasaki has described the brand fanaticism as "something that was stumbled upon". Jony Ive said in 2014 that "people have an incredibly personal relationship" with Apple's products.

Fortune named Apple the most admired company in the United States in 2008, and the most admired company in the world from 2008 to 2012. In 2013, Apple surpassed Coca-Cola to become the world's most valuable brand in Interbrand's "Best Global Brands" report. Boston Consulting Group ranked Apple as the world's most innovative company every year from 2005 through 2017. As of February 2023, more than two billion Apple devices were in active use worldwide.

=== Advertising ===
Apple's first slogan, "Byte into an Apple", was coined in the late 1970s. From 1997 to 2002, the slogan "Think different" was used in advertising campaigns, and is still closely associated with Apple. Apple also has slogans for specific product lines—for example, "iThink, therefore iMac" was used in 1998 to promote the iMac, and "Say hello to iPhone" has been used in iPhone advertisements. "Hello" was also used to introduce the original Macintosh, Newton, iMac ("hello (again)"), and iPod.

From the introduction of the Macintosh in 1984, with the Super Bowl XVIII advertisement "1984" to the more modern Get a Mac adverts, Apple has been recognized for its efforts toward effective advertising and marketing for its products. However, claims made by later campaigns were criticized, particularly the 2005 Power Mac ads. Apple's product advertisements gained significant attention as a result of their graphics and song choice. Musicians who benefited from an improved profile as a result of their songs being included on Apple advertisements include Canadian singer Feist with the song "1234" and Yael Naim with the song "New Soul".

=== Stores ===
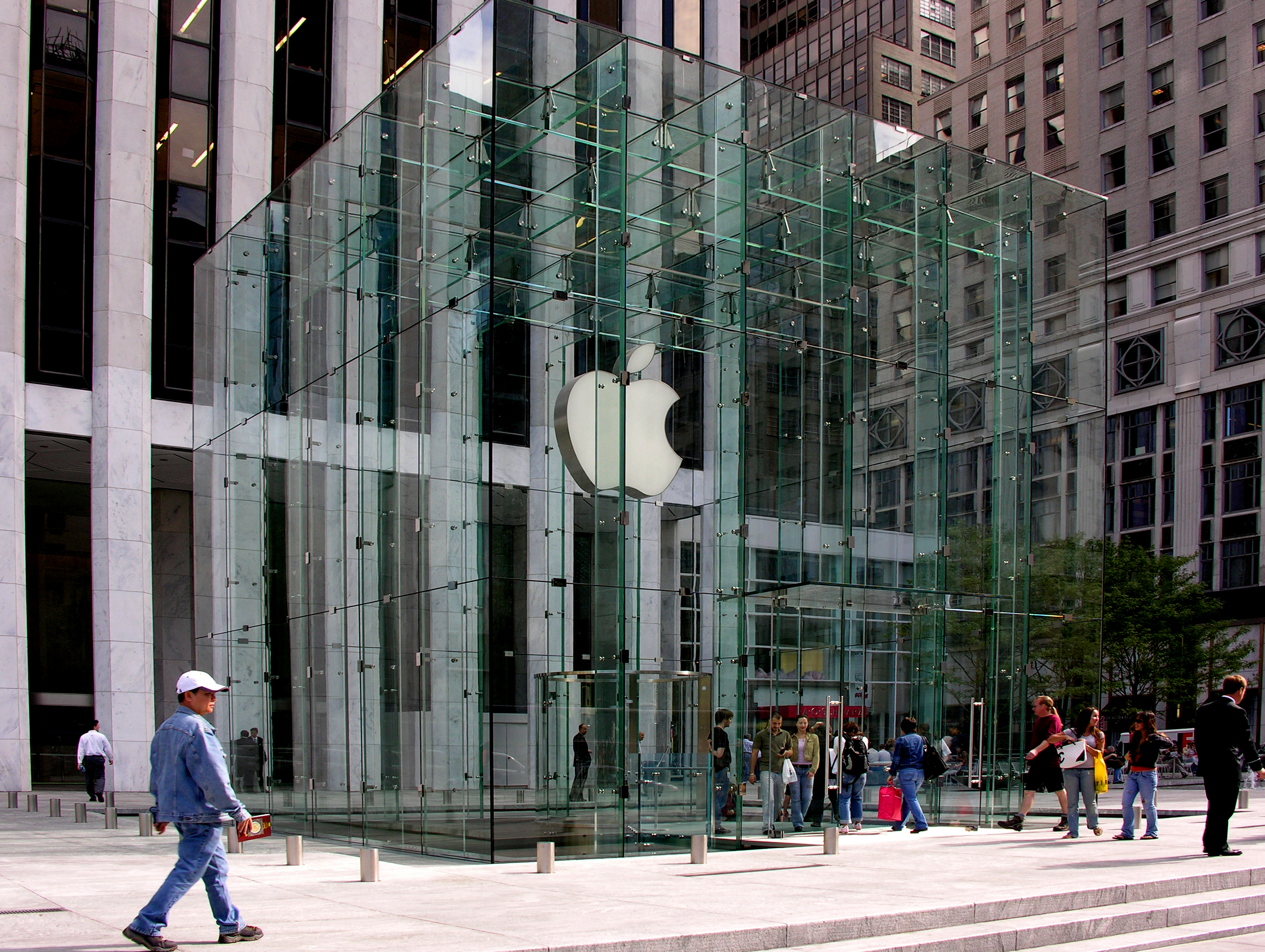
Apple Fifth Avenue is the flagship store in New York City.

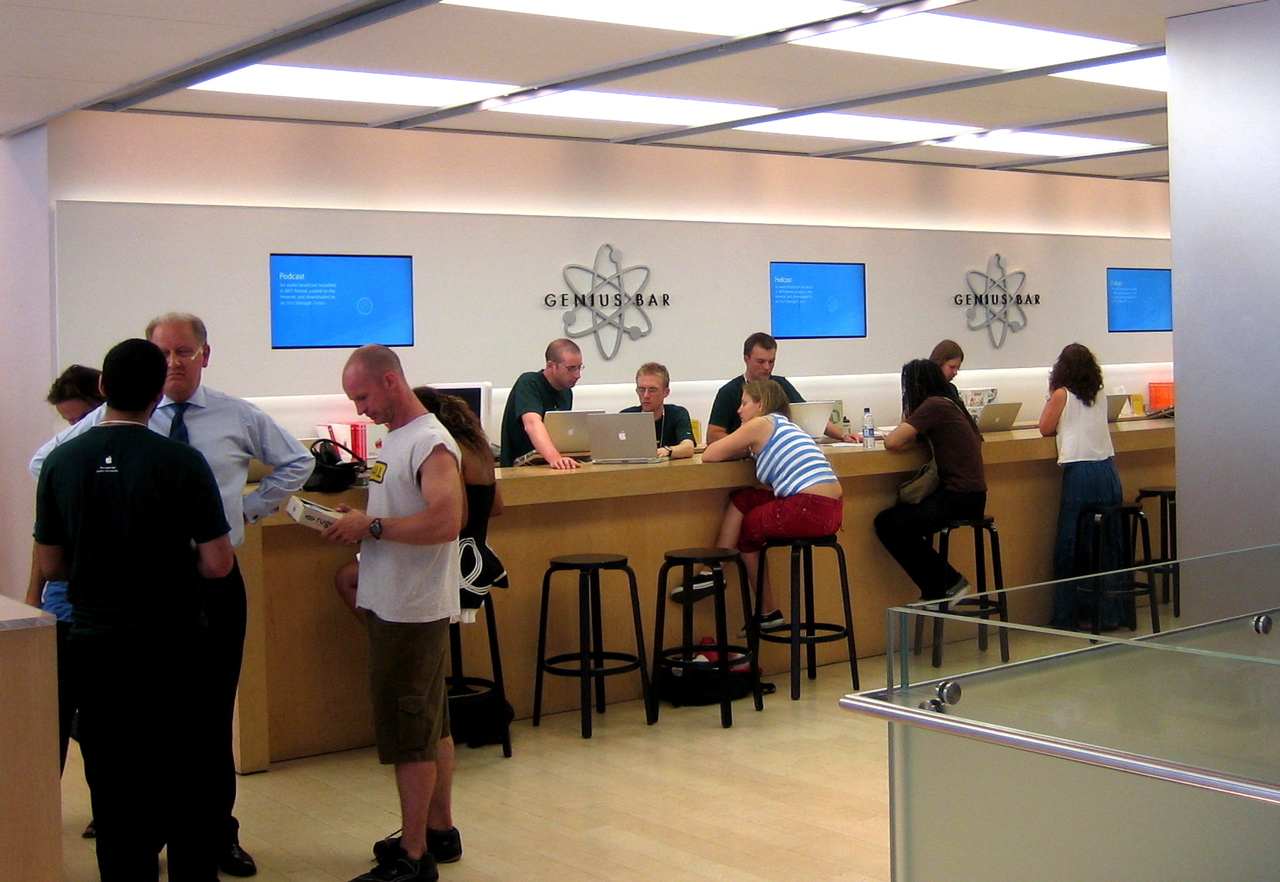
Customers visit the Genius Bar at Apple's Regent Street store in 2006.

The first Apple Stores were originally opened as two locations in May 2001 by then-CEO Steve Jobs, after years of attempting but failing store-within-a-store concepts. Seeing a need for improved retail presentation of the company's products, he began an effort in 1997 to revamp the retail program to improve the company's relationship with consumers, and hired Ron Johnson in 2000. Jobs relaunched Apple's online store in 1997, and opened the first two physical stores in 2001. The media initially speculated that Apple would fail, but they exceeded the sales numbers of competing nearby stores, and within three years reached US$1 billion in annual sales, becoming the fastest retailer in history to do so.

Over the years, Apple has expanded the number of retail locations and its geographical coverage, with 499 stores across 22 countries worldwide as of December 2017. Strong product sales have placed Apple among the top-tier retail stores, with sales over $16 billion globally in 2011. Apple Stores underwent a period of significant redesign, beginning in May 2016. This redesign included physical changes to the Apple Stores, such as open spaces and re-branded rooms, and changes in function to facilitate interaction between consumers and professionals.

Many Apple Stores are located inside shopping malls, but Apple has built several stand-alone "flagship" stores in high-profile locations. It has been granted design patents and received architectural awards for its stores' designs and construction, specifically for its use of glass staircases and cubes. The success of Apple Stores have had significant influence over other consumer electronics retailers, which have lost traffic, control and profits due to a perceived higher quality of service and products at Apple Stores. Due to the popularity of the brand, Apple receives a large number of job applications, many of which come from young workers. Although Apple Store employees receive above-average pay, are offered money toward education and health care, and receive product discounts, there are limited or no paths of career advancement.

=== Market power ===
On March 16, 2020, France fined Apple €1.1 billion for colluding with two wholesalers to stifle competition and keep prices high by impeding independent resellers. The arrangement created aligned prices for Apple products such as iPads and personal computers for about half the French retail market. According to the French regulators, the abuses occurred between 2005 and 2017 but were first discovered after a complaint by an independent reseller, eBizcuss, in 2012.

On August 13, 2020, Epic Games, the maker of the popular game Fortnite, sued Apple and Google after Fortnite was removed from Apple's and Google's app stores. The lawsuits came after Apple and Google blocked the game after it introduced a direct payment system that bypassed the fees that Apple and Google had imposed. In September 2020, Epic Games founded the Coalition for App Fairness together with thirteen other companies, which aims for better conditions for the inclusion of apps in the app stores. Later, in December 2020, Facebook agreed to assist Epic in its legal game against Apple, planning to support the company by providing materials and documents to Epic. Facebook had, however, stated that the company would not participate directly with the lawsuit, although did commit to helping with the discovery of evidence relating to the trial of 2021. In the months prior to their agreement, Facebook had been dealing with feuds against Apple relating to the prices of paid apps and privacy rule changes. Head of ad products for Facebook Dan Levy commented, saying that "this is not really about privacy for them, this is about an attack on personalized ads and the consequences it's going to have on small-business owners", commenting on the full-page ads placed by Facebook in various newspapers in December 2020.

=== Privacy ===
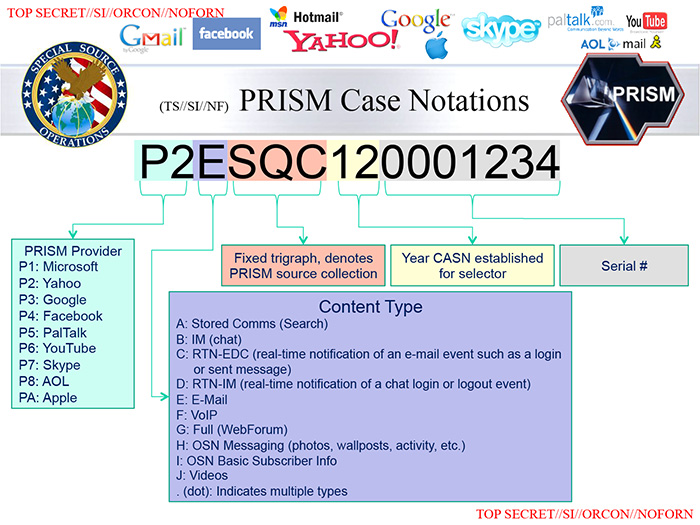
PRISM is a clandestine surveillance program under which the NSA collects user data from companies such as Facebook and Apple.

Apple has publicly taken a pro-privacy stance, actively making privacy-conscious features and settings part of its conferences, promotional campaigns, and public image. With its iOS 8 mobile operating system in 2014, the company started encrypting all contents of iOS devices through users' passcodes, making it impossible at the time for the company to provide customer data to law enforcement requests seeking such information. With the popularity rise of cloud storage solutions, Apple began a technique in 2016 to do deep learning scans for facial data in photos on the user's local device and encrypting the content before uploading it to Apple's iCloud storage system. It also introduced "differential privacy", a way to collect crowdsourced data from many users, while keeping individual users anonymous, in a system that Wired described as "trying to learn as much as possible about a group while learning as little as possible about any individual in it". Users are explicitly asked if they want to participate, and can actively opt-in or opt-out.

However, Apple has aided law enforcement in criminal investigations by providing iCloud backups of users' devices, and the company's commitment to privacy has been questioned by its efforts to promote biometric authentication technology in its iPhone models starting with the iPhone 5s, which do not have the same level of constitutional privacy as a passcode in the United States.

With Apple's release of an update to iOS 14, Apple required all developers of iPhone, iPad, and iPod Touch applications to directly ask iPhone users permission to track them. The feature, called "App Tracking Transparency", received heavy criticism from Facebook, whose primary business model revolves around the tracking of users' data and sharing such data with advertisers so users can see more relevant ads, a technique commonly known as targeted advertising. After Facebook's measures, including purchasing full-page newspaper advertisements protesting App Tracking Transparency, Apple released the update in early 2021. A study by Verizon subsidiary Flurry Analytics reported only 4% of iOS users in the United States and 12% worldwide have opted into tracking.

Prior to the release of iOS 15, Apple announced new efforts at combating child sexual abuse material on iOS and Mac platforms. Parents of minor iMessage users can now be alerted if their child sends or receives nude photographs. Additionally, on-device hashing would take place on media destined for upload to iCloud, and hashes would be compared to a list of known abusive images provided by law enforcement; if enough matches were found, Apple would be alerted and authorities informed. The new features received praise from law enforcement and victims rights advocates. However, privacy advocates, including the Electronic Frontier Foundation, condemned the new features as invasive and highly prone to abuse by authoritarian governments.

Ireland's Data Protection Commission launched a privacy investigation to examine whether Apple complied with the EU's GDPR law following an investigation into how the company processes personal data with targeted ads on its platform.

In December 2019, security researcher Brian Krebs discovered that the iPhone 11 Pro would still show the arrow indicator – signifying location services are being used – at the top of the screen while the main location services toggle is enabled, despite all individual location services being disabled. Krebs was unable to replicate this behavior on older models and when asking Apple for comment, he was told by Apple that "It is expected behavior that the Location Services icon appears in the status bar when Location Services is enabled. The icon appears for system services that do not have a switch in Settings." Apple later further clarified that this behavior was to ensure compliance with ultra-wideband regulations in specific countries, a technology Apple started implementing in iPhones starting with iPhone 11 Pro, and emphasized that "the management of ultra wideband compliance and its use of location data is done entirely on the device and Apple is not collecting user location data." Will Strafach, an executive at security firm Guardian Firewall, confirmed the lack of evidence that location data was sent off to a remote server. Apple promised to add a new toggle for this feature and in later iOS revisions Apple provided users with the option to tap on the location services indicator in Control Center to see which specific service is using the device's location.

According to published reports by Bloomberg News on March 30, 2022, Apple turned over data such as phone numbers, physical addresses, and IP addresses to hackers posing as law enforcement officials using forged documents. The law enforcement requests sometimes included forged signatures of real or fictional officials. When asked about the allegations, an Apple representative referred the reporter to a section of the company policy for law enforcement guidelines, which stated, "We review every data request for legal sufficiency and use advanced systems and processes to validate law enforcement requests and detect abuse."

== Corporate affairs ==
=== Business trends ===
The key trends for Apple are, as of each financial year ending September 24:

Fiscal year	Revenue (in billion US$)						Net profit (in billion US$)	Employees (FTE)	Ref.
Fiscal year	Total	iPhone	Mac	iPad	Other (Note: Apple defines this category as "Wearables, home, and accessories".)	Services	Net profit (in billion US$)	Employees (FTE)	Ref.
2011	108	45.9	21.7	19.1	11.9	9.3	25.9	60,400	
2012	156	78.6	23.2	30.9	10.7	12.8	41.7	72,800	
2013	170	91.2	21.4	31.9	10.1	16.0	37.0	80,300	
2014	182	101	24.0	30.2	8.3	18.0	39.5	92,600	
2015	233	155	25.4	23.2	10.0	19.9	53.3	110,000	
2016	215	136	22.8	20.6	11.1	24.3	45.6	116,000	
2017	229	139	25.5	18.8	12.8	32.7	48.3	123,000	
2018	265	164	25.1	18.3	17.3	39.7	59.3	132,000	
2019	260	142	25.7	21.2	24.4	46.2	55.2	137,000	
2020	274	137	28.6	23.7	30.6	53.7	57.4	147,000	
2021	365	191	35.1	31.8	38.3	68.4	94.6	154,000	
2022	394	205	40.1	29.2	41.2	78.1	99.8	164,000	
2023	383	200	29.3	28.3	39.8	85.2	96.9	161,000	
2024	391	201	29.9	26.6	37.0	96.1	93.7	164,000	
2025	416	209	33.7	28.0	35.6	109	112	166,000	

=== Leadership ===
==== Senior management ====
As of September 1, 2026, the management of Apple includes:

- John Ternus (chief executive officer)
- Eddy Cue (SVP, services and health)
- Craig Federighi (SVP, software engineering)
- Greg Joswiak (SVP, worldwide marketing)
- Sabih Khan (chief operating officer)
- Jennifer Newstead (SVP, general counsel and government affairs)
- Deirdre O'Brien (SVP, retail and people)
- Kevan Parekh (chief financial officer)
- Johny Srouji (chief hardware officer)

==== Board of directors ====
As of September 1, 2026, the board of directors of Apple includes:

- Tim Cook (executive chairman)
- Arthur Levinson (lead independent director)
- John Ternus (CEO)
- Wanda Austin
- Alex Gorsky
- Andrea Jung
- Monica Lozano
- Ronald Sugar
- Susan Wagner

==== Previous CEOs ====
1. Michael Scott (1977–1981)
2. Mike Markkula (1981–1983)
3. John Sculley (1983–1993)
4. Michael Spindler (1993–1996)
5. Gil Amelio (1996–1997)
6. Steve Jobs (1997–2011)
7. Tim Cook (2011–2026)

==== Previous chairmen ====
1. Mike Markkula (1977–1981)
2. Steve Jobs (1981–1985)
3. Mike Markkula (1985–1993)
4. John Sculley (1993)
5. Mike Markkula (1993–1996)
6. Gil Amelio (1996–1997)
7. Steve Jobs (2011)
8. Arthur Levinson (2011–2026)

=== Corporate culture ===
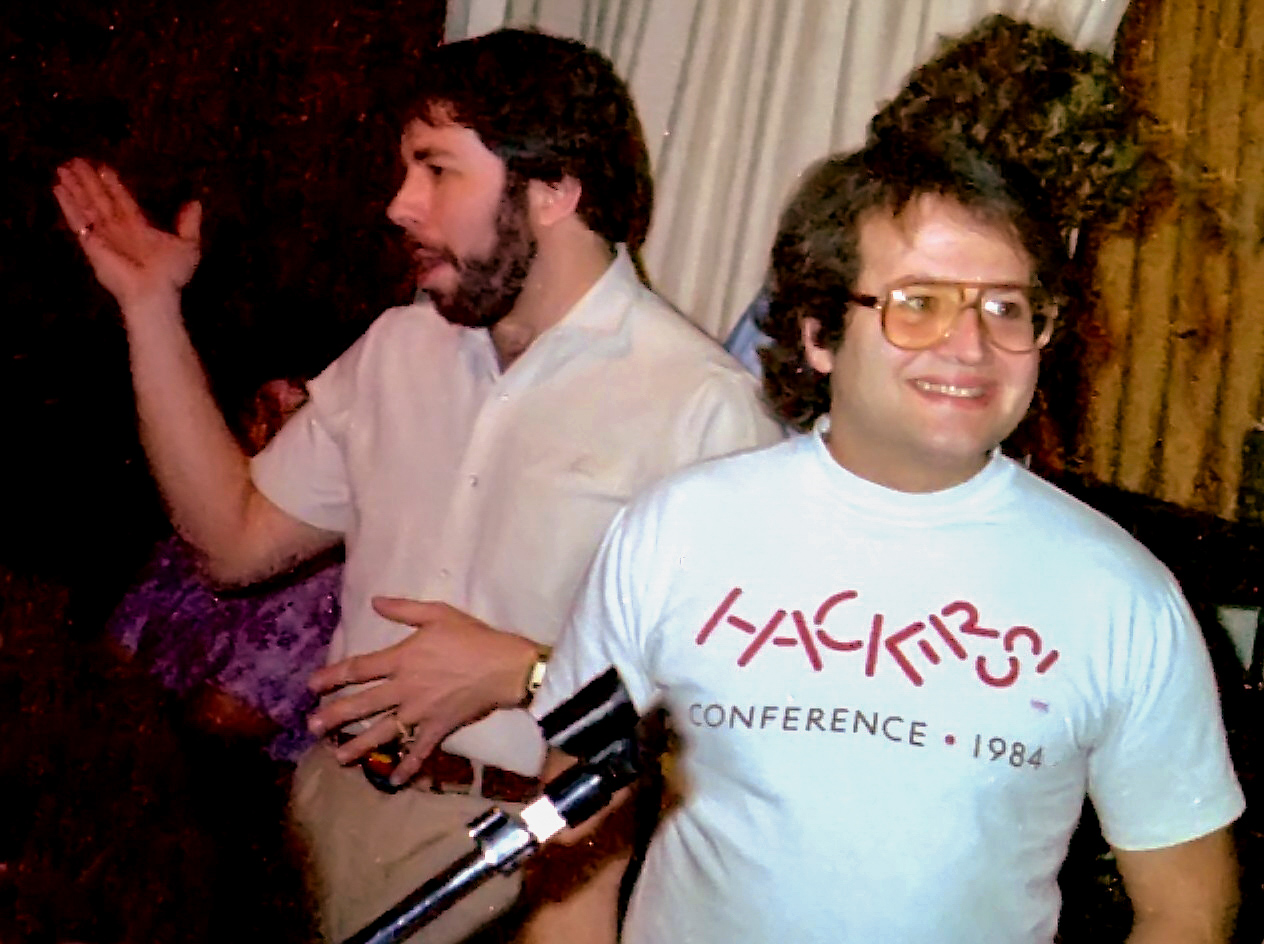
Co-founder Steve Wozniak and Macintosh engineer Andy Hertzfeld attended the Apple User Group Connection club in 1985.

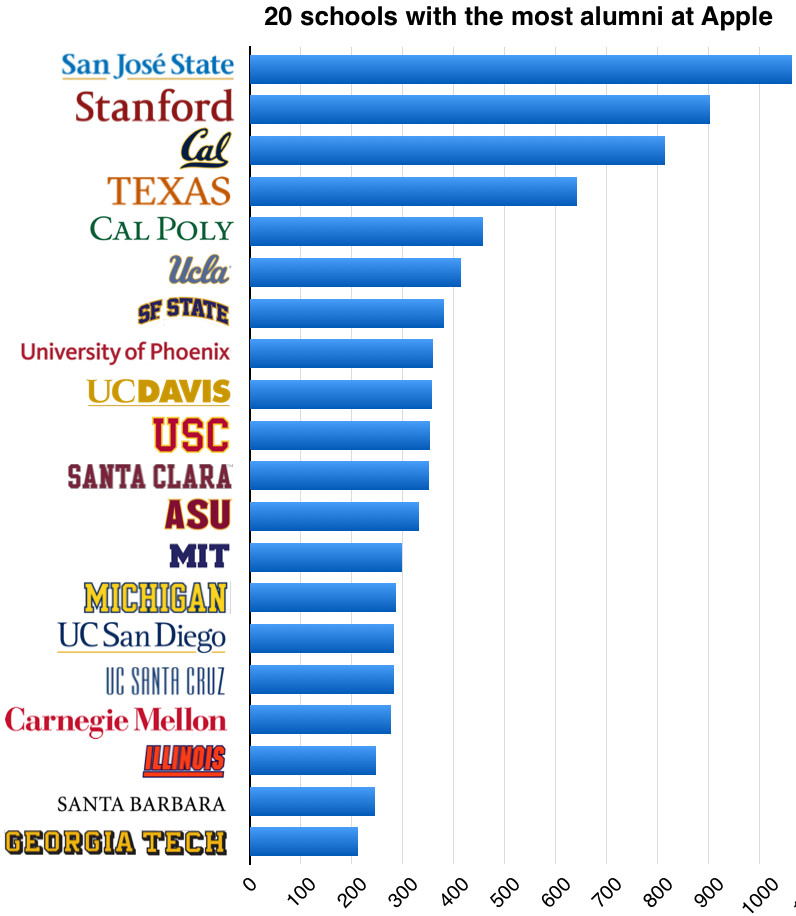
Universities that produced the most alumni who became Apple employees

Apple is one of several highly successful companies founded in the 1970s that bucked the traditional notions of corporate culture. Jobs often walked around the office barefoot even after Apple became a Fortune 500 company. By the time of the "1984" television advertisement, Apple's informal culture had become a key trait that differentiated it from its competitors. According to a 2011 report in Fortune, this has resulted in a corporate culture more akin to a startup rather than a multinational corporation. In a 2017 interview, Wozniak credited watching Star Trek and attending Star Trek conventions in his youth as inspiration for co-founding Apple.

As the company has grown and been led by a series of differently opinionated chief executives, some media have suggested that it has lost some of its original character. Nonetheless, it has maintained a reputation for fostering individuality and excellence that reliably attracts talented workers, particularly after Jobs returned. Numerous Apple employees have stated that projects without Jobs' involvement often took longer than others.

The Apple Fellows program awards employees for extraordinary technical or leadership contributions to personal computing. Recipients include Bill Atkinson, Steve Capps, Rod Holt, Alan Kay, Guy Kawasaki, Al Alcorn, Don Norman, Rich Page, Steve Wozniak, and Phil Schiller.

Jobs intended that employees were to be specialists who are not exposed to functions outside their area of expertise. For instance, Ron Johnson—Senior Vice President of Retail Operations until November 1, 2011—was responsible for site selection, in-store service, and store layout, yet had no control of the inventory in his stores. This was done by Tim Cook, who had a background in supply-chain management. Apple is known for strictly enforcing accountability. Each project has a "directly responsible individual" or "DRI" in Apple jargon. Unlike other major US companies, Apple provides a relatively simple compensation policy for executives that does not include perks enjoyed by other CEOs like country club fees or private use of company aircraft. The company typically grants stock options to executives every other year.

In 2015, Apple had 110,000 full-time employees. This increased to 116,000 full-time employees the next year, a notable hiring decrease, largely due to its first revenue decline. Apple does not specify how many of its employees work in retail, though its 2014 SEC filing put the number at approximately half of its employee base. In September 2017, Apple announced that it had over 123,000 full-time employees.

Apple has a strong culture of corporate secrecy, and has an anti-leak Global Security team that recruits from the National Security Agency, the Federal Bureau of Investigation, and the United States Secret Service. In December 2017, Glassdoor said Apple was the 48th best place to work, having originally entered at rank 19 in 2009, peaking at rank 10 in 2012, and falling down the ranks in subsequent years. In 2023, Bloomberg's Mark Gurman revealed the existence of Apple's Exploratory Design Group (XDG), which was working to add glucose monitoring to the Apple Watch. Gurman compared XDG to Alphabet's X "moonshot factory".

=== Criticism and controversies ===
Apple has faced criticism regarding its market practices, labor conditions, and privacy policies. The company has been criticized for alleged anti-competitive behavior and its alleged participation in the PRISM surveillance program. Significant concerns have been raised about labor issues in its supply chain, restrictions on the right to repair, and the company's tax strategies and environmental impact. Furthermore, Apple has faced scrutiny for its business operations in nations with restrictive human rights records, such as China.

On May 5, 2026, Apple settled for $250 million a shareholder lawsuit after the lawsuit was filed by Peter Landsheft in US federal court in California in 2024 over delays in AI upgrades to Siri.

=== Offices ===
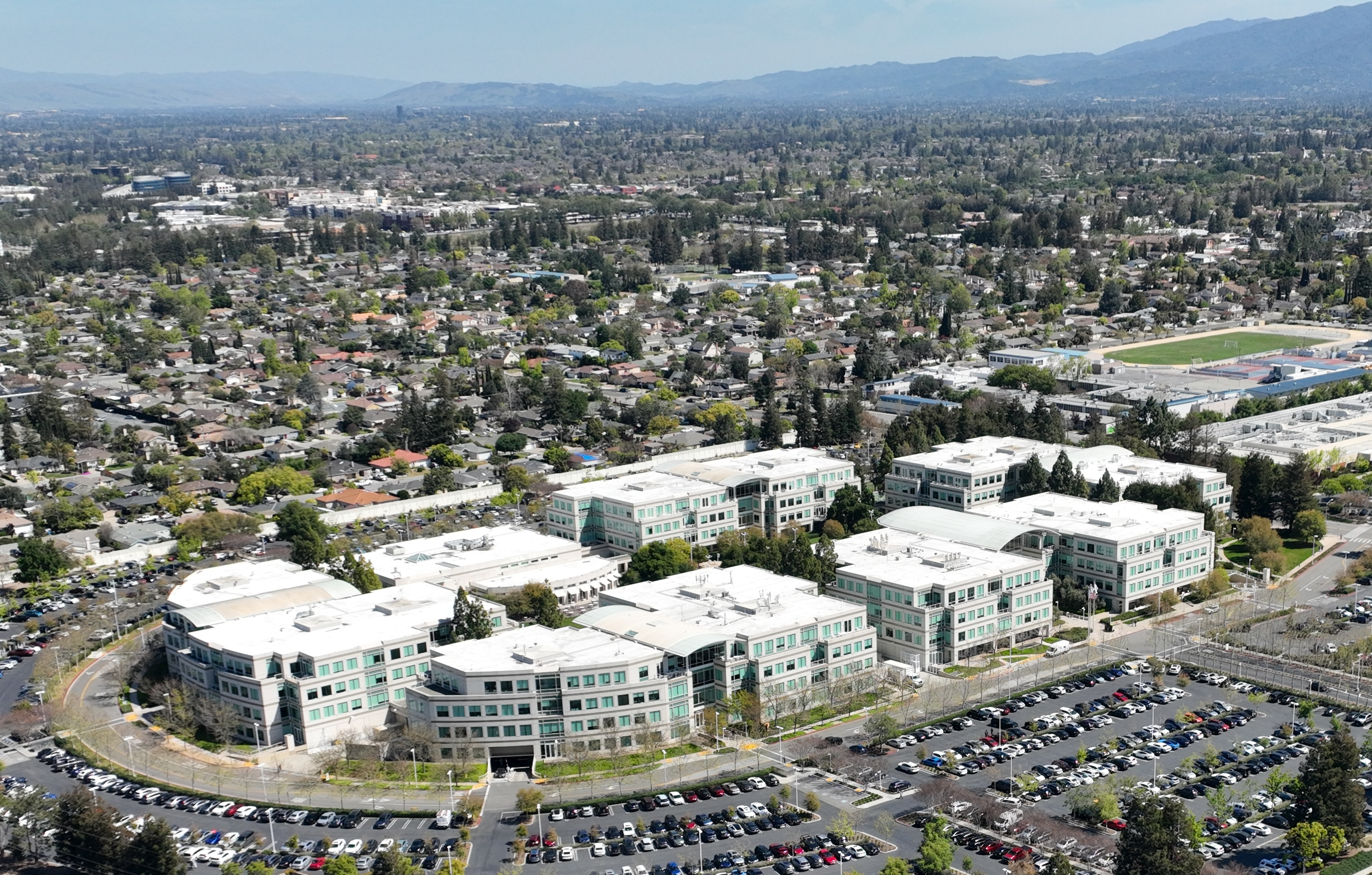
Apple Infinite Loop campus in Cupertino

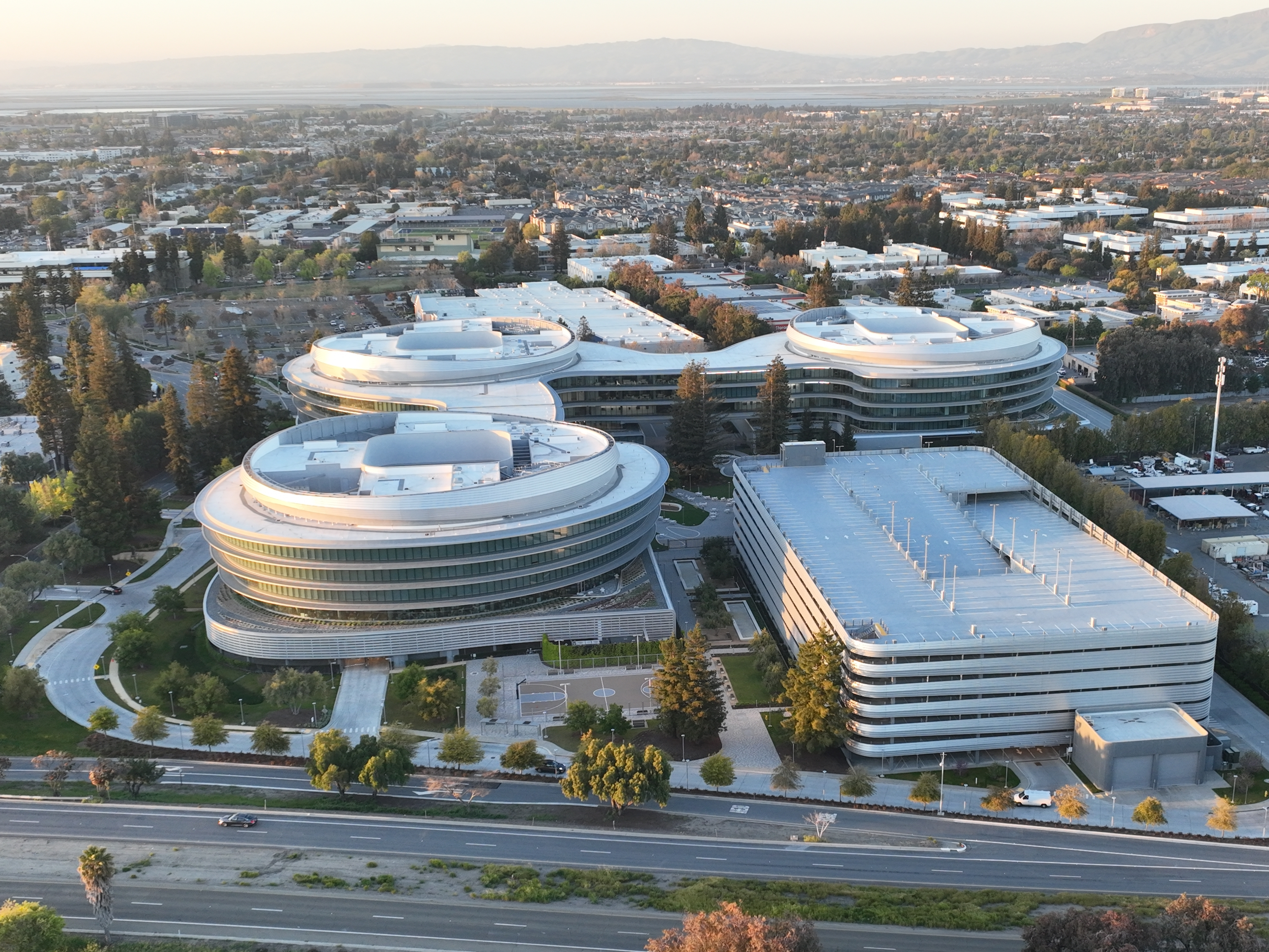
Apple Wolfe campus in Sunnyvale

Apple's headquarters are located at Apple Park in Cupertino, in the center of Silicon Valley. Opened in 2017, the circular groundscraper houses more than 12,000 employees. Apple co-founder Steve Jobs envisioned the campus as resembling a nature preserve rather than a conventional office park, and presented the proposal to the Cupertino City Council in June 2011 during his final public appearance before his death.

Apple also operates the Infinite Loop campus, approximately 1 mile (1.6 km) west of Apple Park. Opened in 1993 as a research and development campus, it served as Apple's headquarters from 1997 until the opening of Apple Park in 2017 and continues to house offices and laboratories.

In nearby Sunnyvale, California, Apple occupies the Wolfe campus, which was completed in 2018 after the company acquired the office development during construction.

In addition to these campuses, Apple occupies numerous office and research buildings throughout Cupertino and Sunnyvale, including the former headquarters buildings Stephens Creek 3 (1977–1978) and Mariani 1 (1982–1993).

Apple's headquarters for Europe, the Middle East and Africa (EMEA) are located in Cork in the south of Ireland, called the Hollyhill campus. The facility, which opened in 1980, houses 5,500 people and was Apple's first location outside of the United States. Apple's international sales and distribution arms operate out of the campus in Cork.

Apple has two campuses near Austin, Texas: a 216,000-square-foot (20,100 m^{2}) campus opened in 2014 houses 500 engineers who work on Apple silicon and a 1.1-million-square-foot (100,000 m^{2}) campus opened in 2021 where 6,000 people work in technical support, supply chain management, online store curation, and Apple Maps data management. The company also has several other major locations in Boulder, Colorado, Culver City, California, Elk Grove, California, Herzliya, London, Los Angeles, Munich, San Diego, Seattle, and Shanghai that each employ hundreds of people.

=== Litigation ===
Apple has been a participant in various legal proceedings and claims since it began operation. In particular, Apple is known for and promotes itself as actively and aggressively enforcing its intellectual property interests. Some litigation examples include Apple v. Samsung, Apple v. Microsoft, Motorola Mobility v. Apple Inc., and Apple Corps v. Apple Computer. Apple has also had to defend itself against charges on numerous occasions of violating intellectual property rights. Most have been dismissed in the courts as shell companies known as patent trolls, with no evidence of actual use of patents in question. On December 21, 2016, Nokia announced that in the US and Germany, it has filed a suit against Apple, claiming that the latter's products infringe on Nokia's patents.

Most recently, in November 2017, the United States International Trade Commission announced an investigation into allegations of patent infringement regarding Apple's remote desktop technology; Aqua Connect, a company that builds remote desktop software, has claimed that Apple infringed on two of its patents.

Epic Games filed a lawsuit against Apple in August 2020 in the United States District Court for the Northern District of California, related to Apple's practices in the App Store for iOS.

In January 2022, Ericsson sued Apple over payment of royalty of 5G technology. On June 24, 2024, the European Commission accused Apple of violating the Digital Markets Act by preventing "app developers from freely steering consumers to alternative channels for offers and content". In April 2025, Apple was found guilty and fined €500 million ($570 million) for violating the Digital Markets Act.

In September 2026, Apple faced a proposed £2 billion collection action in the UK Competition Appeal Tribunal concerning its App Tracking Transparency framework, with thousands of app developers alleging that the rules disadvantaged third-party developers.

=== Lobbying ===
In 2025, Apple was one of the donors who funded the White House's East Wing demolition and planned building of a ballroom.

== Finances ==
Revenue by market (2024)
Country	Share
Americas	43.7%
EMEA	25.9%
Greater China	17.1%
Rest of Asia-Pacific	7.8%
Japan	6.1%

As of 2024, Apple was the world's fourth-largest personal computer vendor, the largest vendor of tablet computers, and the largest vendor of mobile phones. It is a Big Tech company.

In its fiscal year ending in September 2011, Apple reported a total of $108 billion in annual revenues—a significant increase from its 2010 revenues of $65 billion—and nearly $82 billion in cash reserves. On March 19, 2012, Apple announced plans for a $2.65-per-share dividend beginning in the fourth quarter of 2012, per approval by its board of directors.

The company's worldwide annual revenue in 2013 totaled $170 billion. In May 2013, Apple entered the top ten of the Fortune 500 list of companies for the first time, rising 11 places above its 2012 ranking to take the sixth position. As of 2016, Apple has around US$234 billion of cash and marketable securities, of which 90% is located outside the United States for tax purposes.

Apple amassed 65% of all profits made by the eight largest worldwide smartphone manufacturers in quarter one of 2014, according to a report by Canaccord Genuity. In the first quarter of 2015, the company garnered 92% of all earnings.

On April 30, 2017, The Wall Street Journal reported that Apple had cash reserves of $250 billion, officially confirmed by Apple as specifically $256.8 billion a few days later.

As of August 3, 2018, Apple was the largest publicly traded corporation in the world by market capitalization. On August 2, 2018, Apple became the first publicly traded US company to reach a $1 trillion market value, and, as of October 2025, is valued at just over $4 trillion. Apple was ranked No. 3 on the 2023 Fortune 500 rankings of the largest United States corporations by revenue.

In July 2022, Apple reported an 11% decline in Q3 profits compared to 2021. Its revenue in the same period rose 2% year-on-year to $83 billion, though this figure was also lower than in 2021, where the increase was at 36%. The general downturn is reportedly caused by the slowing global economy and supply chain disruptions in China. That year, Apple was one of the largest corporate spenders on research and development worldwide, with R&D expenditure amounting to over $27 billion.

In May 2023, Apple reported a decline in its sales for the first quarter of 2023. Compared to that of 2022, revenue for 2023 fell by 3%. This is Apple's second consecutive quarter of sales decline. This fall is attributed to the slowing economy and consumers putting off purchases of iPads and computers due to increased pricing. However, iPhone sales held up with a year-on-year increase of 1.5%. According to Apple, demands for such devices were strong, particularly in Latin America and South Asia.

=== Taxes ===
Apple has created subsidiaries in low-tax places such as Ireland, the Netherlands, Luxembourg, and the British Virgin Islands to cut the taxes it pays around the world. According to The New York Times, in the 1980s Apple was among the first tech companies to designate overseas salespeople in high-tax countries in a manner that allowed the company to sell on behalf of low-tax subsidiaries on other continents, sidestepping income taxes. In the late 1980s, Apple was a pioneer of an accounting technique known as the "Double Irish with a Dutch sandwich", which reduces taxes by routing profits through Irish subsidiaries and the Netherlands and then to the Caribbean.

British Conservative Party Member of Parliament Charlie Elphicke published research on October 30, 2012, which showed that some multinational companies, including Apple, were making billions of pounds of profit in the UK, but were paying an effective tax rate to the UK Treasury of only 3 percent, well below standard corporate tax rates. He followed this research by calling on the Chancellor of the Exchequer George Osborne to force these multinationals, which also included Google and the Coca-Cola Company, to state the effective rate of tax it pays on its UK revenues. Elphicke also said that government contracts should be withheld from multinationals who do not pay their fair share of UK tax.

According to a US Senate report on the company's offshore tax structure concluded in May 2013, Apple has held billions of dollars in profits in Irish subsidiaries to pay little or no taxes to any government by using an unusual global tax structure. The main subsidiary, a holding company that includes Apple's retail stores throughout Europe, has not paid any corporate income tax in the last five years. "Apple has exploited a difference between Irish and U.S. tax residency rules", the report said. On May 21, 2013, Apple CEO Tim Cook defended his company's tax tactics at a Senate hearing.

Apple says that it is the single largest taxpayer in the US, with an effective tax rate of approximately of 26% as of Q2 FY2016. In an interview with the German newspaper FAZ in October 2017, Tim Cook stated that Apple was the biggest taxpayer worldwide.

In 2016, after a two-year investigation, the European Commission claimed that Apple's use of a hybrid Double Irish tax arrangement constituted "illegal state aid" from Ireland, and ordered Apple to pay €13 billion ($14.5 billion) in unpaid taxes, the largest corporate tax fine in history. This was later annulled, after the European General Court ruled that the commission had provided insufficient evidence. In 2018, Apple repatriated $285 billion to the United States, resulting in a $38-billion tax payment spread over the following eight years.

Apple's effective tax rate in %
2000	2001	2002	2003	2004	2005	2006	2007	2008	2009	2010	2011	2012	2013	2014	2015	2016	2017	2018	2019
28	30	25	26	28	26	29	30	30	31.8	24.4	24.2	25.2	26.2	26.1	26.4	25.6	24.6	18.3	15.9
2020	2021	2022	2023	2024	2025														
14.4	13.3	16.2	14.7	24.1	15.6														

=== Charity ===
Apple is a partner of Product Red, a fundraising campaign for AIDS charity. In November 2014, Apple arranged for all App Store revenue in a two-week period to go to the fundraiser, generating more than US$20 million, and in March 2017, it released an iPhone 7 with a red color finish. As of 2021, Apple has donated over $250 million to Product Red.

Apple contributes financially to fundraisers in times of natural disasters. In November 2012, it donated $2.5 million to the American Red Cross to aid relief efforts after Hurricane Sandy, and in 2017 it donated $5 million to relief efforts for both Hurricane Irma and Hurricane Harvey, and for the 2017 Central Mexico earthquake. The company has used its iTunes platform to encourage donations in the wake of environmental disasters and humanitarian crises, such as the 2010 Haiti earthquake, the 2011 Japan earthquake, Typhoon Haiyan in the Philippines in November 2013, and the 2015 European migrant crisis. Apple emphasizes that it does not incur any processing or other fees for iTunes donations, sending 100% of the payments directly to relief efforts, though it also acknowledges that the Red Cross does not receive any personal information on the users donating and that the payments may not be tax deductible.

On April 14, 2016, Apple and the World Wide Fund for Nature (WWF) announced that they have engaged in a partnership to, "help protect life on our planet". Apple released a special page in its App Store, Apps for Earth. In the arrangement, Apple has committed that through April 24, WWF will receive 100% of the proceeds from the applications participating in the App Store via both the purchases of any paid apps and the In-App Purchases. Apple and WWF's Apps for Earth campaign raised more than $8 million in total proceeds to support WWF's conservation work. WWF announced the results at WWDC 2016 in San Francisco.

During the COVID-19 pandemic, Apple's CEO Cook announced that the company would be donating "millions" of masks to health workers in the United States and Europe. On January 13, 2021, Apple announced a $100-million Racial Equity and Justice Initiative to help combat institutional racism worldwide after the 2020 murder of George Floyd. In June 2023, Apple announced that it was doubling this and then distributed more than $200 million to support organizations focused on education, economic growth, and criminal justice. Half is philanthropic grants and half is centered on equity.

== Environment ==
=== Apple Energy ===
Apple Energy, LLC is a wholly owned subsidiary of Apple that sells solar energy. As of June 6, 2016, Apple's solar farms in California and Nevada have been declared to provide 217.9 megawatts of solar generation capacity. Apple has received regulatory approval to construct a landfill gas energy plant in North Carolina to use the methane emissions to generate electricity. Apple's North Carolina data center is already powered entirely by renewable sources.

=== Energy and resources ===
In 2010, Climate Counts, a nonprofit organization dedicated to directing consumers toward the greenest companies, gave Apple a score of 52 points out of a possible 100, which puts Apple in its top category "Striding". This was an increase from May 2008, when Climate Counts only gave Apple 11 points out of 100, which placed the company last among electronics companies, at which time Climate Counts also labeled Apple with a "stuck icon", adding that Apple at the time was "a choice to avoid for the climate-conscious consumer".

Following a Greenpeace protest, Apple released a statement on April 17, 2012, committing to ending its use of coal and shifting to 100% renewable clean energy. By 2013, Apple was using 100% renewable energy to power its data centers. Overall, 75% of the company's power came from clean renewable sources.

In May 2015, Greenpeace evaluated the state of the Green Internet and commended Apple on its environmental practices saying, "Apple's commitment to renewable energy has helped set a new bar for the industry, illustrating in very concrete terms that a 100% renewable Internet is within its reach, and providing several models of intervention for other companies that want to build a sustainable Internet."

As of 2016, Apple states that 100% of its US operations run on renewable energy, 100% of Apple's data centers run on renewable energy and 93% of Apple's global operations run on renewable energy. However, the facilities are connected to the local grid which usually contains a mix of fossil and renewable sources, so Apple uses carbon offsets for its electricity use. The Electronic Product Environmental Assessment Tool (EPEAT) allows consumers to see the effect a product has on the environment. Each product receives a Gold, Silver, or Bronze rank depending on its efficiency and sustainability. Every Apple tablet, notebook, desktop computer, and display that EPEAT ranks achieves a Gold rating, the highest possible. Although Apple's data centers recycle water 35 times, the increased activity in retail, corporate and data centers also increase the amount of water use to 573 million US gal (2.2 million m^{3}) in 2015.

During an event on March 21, 2016, Apple provided a status update on its environmental initiative to be 100% renewable in all of its worldwide operations. Lisa P. Jackson, Apple's vice president of Environment, Policy and Social Initiatives who reports directly to CEO, Tim Cook, announced that as of March 2016, 93% of Apple's worldwide operations are powered with renewable energy. Also featured was the company's efforts to use sustainable paper in its product packaging; 99% of all paper used by Apple in the product packaging comes from post-consumer recycled paper or sustainably managed forests, as the company continues its move to all paper packaging for all of its products.

Apple announced on August 16, 2016, that Lens Technology, one of its major suppliers in China, has committed to power all its glass production for Apple with 100 percent renewable energy by 2018. The commitment was a large step in Apple's efforts to help manufacturers lower their carbon footprint in China. Apple also announced that all 14 of its final assembly sites in China are now compliant with UL's Zero Waste to Landfill validation. The standard, which started in January 2015, certifies that all manufacturing waste is reused, recycled, composted, or converted into energy (when necessary). Since the program began, nearly 140,000 metric tons of waste have been diverted from landfills.

On July 21, 2020, Apple announced its plan to become carbon neutral across its entire business, manufacturing supply chain, and product life cycle by 2030. In the next 10 years, Apple will try to lower emissions with a series of innovative actions, including: low carbon product design, expanding energy efficiency, renewable energy, process and material innovations, and carbon removal.

In June 2024, the United States Environmental Protection Agency (EPA) published a report about an electronic computer manufacturing facility leased by Apple in 2015 in Santa Clara, California, code named Aria. The EPA report stated that Apple was potentially in violation of federal regulations under the Resource Conservation and Recovery Act (RCRA). According to a report from Bloomberg in 2018, the facility is used to develop microLED screens under the code name T159. The inspection found that Apple was potentially mistreating waste as only subject to California regulations and that it had potentially miscalculated the effectiveness of Apple's activated carbon filters, which filter volatile organic compounds (VOCs) from the air. The EPA inspected the facility in August 2023 due to a tip from a former Apple employee who posted the report on X.

=== Toxins ===
Following further campaigns by Greenpeace, in 2008, Apple became the first electronics manufacturer to eliminate all polyvinyl chloride (PVC) and brominated flame retardants (BFRs) in its complete product line. In June 2007, Apple began replacing the cold cathode fluorescent lamp (CCFL) backlit LCDs in its computers with mercury-free LED-backlit LCD and arsenic-free glass, starting with the upgraded MacBook Pro. Apple offers comprehensive and transparent information about the CO_{2}e, emissions, materials, and electrical usage concerning every product it currently produces or has sold in the past (and which it has enough data needed to produce the report), in its portfolio on its homepage. Allowing consumers to make informed purchasing decisions on the products it offers for sale. In June 2009, Apple's iPhone 3GS was free of PVC, arsenic, and BFRs. Since 2009, all Apple products have mercury-free LED-backlit LCDs, arsenic-free glass, and non-PVC cables. All Apple products have EPEAT Gold status and beat the latest Energy Star guidelines in each product's respective regulatory category.

In November 2011, Apple was featured in Greenpeace's Guide to Greener Electronics, which ranks electronics manufacturers on sustainability, climate and energy policy, and how "green" its products are. The company ranked fourth of fifteen electronics companies (moving up five places from the previous year) with a score of 4.6/10. Greenpeace praised Apple's sustainability, noting that the company exceeded its 70% global recycling goal in 2010. Apple continues to score well on product ratings, with all of its products now being free of PVC plastic and BFRs. However, the guide criticized Apple on the Energy criteria for not seeking external verification of its greenhouse gas emissions data, and for not setting any targets to reduce emissions. In January 2012, Apple requested that its cable maker, Volex, begin producing halogen-free USB and power cables.

=== Green bonds ===
In February 2016, Apple issued a US$1.5-billion green bond (climate bond), the first ever of its kind by a US tech company. The green bond proceeds are dedicated to the financing of environmental projects.

== Supply chain ==
As of 2018, Apple used hardware components from 43 different countries.

Apple products were made in the United States in Apple-owned factories until the late 1990s; however, as a result of outsourcing initiatives in the 2000s, almost all of its manufacturing is now handled abroad. According to a report by The New York Times, Apple insiders "believe the vast scale of overseas factories, as well as the flexibility, diligence and industrial skills of foreign workers, have so outpaced their American counterparts that 'Made in the U.S.A.' is no longer a viable option for most Apple products". South Korean firms, including Samsung and LG, worked closely with Apple as parts partners for the iMac, iPod, and iPhone before it increased its reliance on Taiwan and China. Taiwanese Apple suppliers such as Foxconn, Wistron, Pegatron, Quanta, and Compal Electronics established a sizable manufacturing presence in China. By the 2020s, orders were shifting to Chinese firms such as to Luxshare, BYD Electronic, Goertek, and Wingtech. By 2021, Apple had more suppliers from China than Taiwan. In March 2017, The Wall Street Journal reported that Apple would begin manufacturing iPhone models in India "over the next two months", and in May, the Journal wrote that an Apple manufacturer had begun production of iPhone SE in the country, In May 2017, the company announced a $1-billion funding project for "advanced manufacturing" in the United States, In April 2019, Apple initiated manufacturing of iPhone 7 at its Bengaluru facility.

The company's manufacturing, procurement, and logistics enable it to execute massive product launches without having to maintain large, profit-sapping inventories. In 2011, Apple's profit margins were 40 percent, compared with between 10 and 20 percent for most other hardware companies. Cook's catchphrase to describe his focus on the company's operational arm is: "Nobody wants to buy sour milk."

=== Labor force ===
Apple directly employs 147,000 workers including 25,000 corporate employees in Apple Park and across Silicon Valley. The vast majority of its employees work at the over 500 retail Apple Stores globally. Apple relies on a larger, outsourced workforce for manufacturing, particularly in China where Apple directly employs 10,000 workers across its retail and corporate divisions. In addition, one further million workers are contracted by Apple's suppliers to assemble Apple products, including Foxconn and Pegatron. Zhengzhou Technology Park alone employs 350,000 Chinese workers in Zhengzhou to exclusively work on the iPhone.

Apple workers around the globe have been involved in organizing since the 1990s. Apple unions are made up of retail, corporate, and outsourced workers. Apple employees have joined trade unions or formed works councils in Australia, France, Germany, Italy, Japan, the United Kingdom and the United States. In 2021, Apple Together, a solidarity union, sought to bring together the company's global worker organizations. The majority of industrial labor disputes (including union recognition) involving Apple occur indirectly through its suppliers and contractors, notably Foxconn plants in China and, to a lesser extent, in Brazil and India.

Apple has been criticized for labor sourcing and conditions at the facilities of its contract manufacturers as well as mines.

== See also ==
- List of Apple Inc. media events
- Outline of Apple Inc.
