= Criticism of Apple Inc. =

Apple Inc. has been the subject of criticism and legal action. This includes criticisms of its handling of labor violations at outsourced manufacturing hubs in China, the environmental impact of its supply chains, tax and monopoly practices, a lack of diversity and women in leadership in corporate and retail roles, labor conditions including the handling of sexual misconduct complaints, and its response to worker organizing.

== Antitrust and anti-competitive practices ==
United States v. Apple is an antitrust lawsuit by the United States Department of Justice (DOJ) in 2024. The lawsuit contrasts Apple's practices with those of Microsoft in United States v. Microsoft Corp. and alleges that Apple engages in similar tactics while committing even more egregious violations. This followed Epic Games v. Apple and the enforcement of the Digital Markets Act in the European Union.

Apple, Google, and other major technology companies illegally conspired in a "no-poaching" pact to prevent employees from seeking improved compensation, a practice that The New York Times called ‘embarrassing.’ A class-action lawsuit was settled for $415 million in 2015.

Additionally, the European Union fined Apple €1.84 billion (approximately $2 billion) in March 2024 for abusing its market power in the App Store with music streaming services by preventing developers from mentioning cheaper options to iOS users.

=== Intellectual property enforcement ===
Apple has faced criticism for its aggressive enforcement of intellectual property (IP) rights, including legal actions challenging various trademark applications. For example, The New York Times reported that Apple opposed trademarks such as a logo featuring three interlocking apples used by the Appleton Area School District, and a podcast named "Talk About Apples" created by an Atlanta-based artist. The company has also objected to trademark filings by Apple Urgent Care in California, artist Franki Pineapple, DOPi (a company that makes laptop bags and phone cases) for the lowercase i, and the Woolworths supermarket chain in Australia, whose "W" logo resembles an apple. Critics have described these enforcement actions as examples of corporate overreach, with The New York Times describing Apple's strategy as "bullying" and NBC News as "lunacy". In 2023, Apple sought IP rights over apple-related imagery in Switzerland, which drew further scrutiny over its approach to trademark enforcement. Smaller competitors told the United States Congress in 2020 that such "bullying" drives them out of business, stifling competition. The Register wrote in 2006 that Apple "sues itself in the foot" for a lawsuit against a community site for deep linking to the MacBook Pro service manual claiming the site infringed on their IP rights. Apple has pursued civil and criminal action against blogs over IP to maintain its culture of secrecy.

=== Vendor lock-in practices ===
Apple has been criticized for the use of proprietary parts, thereby hindering self‑repair and independent servicing. Apple has similarly faced controversy for having proprietary content ecosystems where the corporation gets to set unilateral policy. These proprietary services include the iTunes music and the App Store where it gets to unilaterally determine what content will be hosted, margins, and pricing.

== Culture of secrecy ==
Employees have criticized Apple's culture of secrecy saying that differing levels of access to information create hierarchies of superiority within the company. They said it wears developers down and isolates them from their loved ones. In 2017, an Apple engineer was fired after his daughter recorded a video of the new iPhone X in the cafeteria and posted it to YouTube. Employees and outsiders have described Apple's secretive culture as creating a culture of fear and oppression. One employee told The New York Times, "Never have I met people more terrified to speak out against their employer."

The Outline said the secrecy is a "needless cult" because it does not stop leaks. Apple has issued misinformation to find leakers and keep the media unsure of current developments. Apple coordinated 'controlled' leaks to the public to gauge viability of products such as the iPad. The Guardian reported research showing pre-release product information gives people the time and opportunity to consider their purchases carefully, but sudden product launches cause people to make purchases more impulsively.

=== Investigating leaks and tracking lost prototypes ===
Apple aggressively investigates potential leaks and prosecutes and litigates against employees who are caught. In 2004, Apple sued several unnamed employees for leaking confidential information to two blogs. The Electronic Frontier Foundation (EFF) opposed Apple’s request for discovery of the blogs’ sources, and in 2006 the court of appeals sided with the EFF. In 2009, the strict secrecy drew ire from the public after a worker who lost a device died by suicide.

In 2009, Gizmodo published an article titled, "Apple Gestapo: How Apple Hunts Down Leaks," which detailed Apple's Worldwide Loyalty Team responsible for tracking down leaks and lost prototypes. Employees reportedly called the team the Gestapo, named after Nazi Germany's secret police. When the team suspects a leak, suspected departments are put on lockdown, searched, and asked to hand over their devices and sign non-disclosure agreements or face disciplinary action up to termination. Gizmodo and ZDNET compared the practice to George Orwell's novel 1984. ZDNET referred to the operations as "raids" and characterized them as "quite scary."

In 2010, a Reuters reporter was assaulted while taking photos outside of a Foxconn plant during an investigation. Later that year, Apple obtained a search warrant to raid a Gizmodo blogger's home in search of an iPhone prototype that was purchased from someone who found it at a bar. The man who found it at the bar was charged with theft and the blogger was cleared of all charges. The New York Times described Apple's response to the events as "churlish". CNN argued that constitutionally and under the Law of California, the district attorney should have issued a subpoena instead of a search warrant. Columbia Journalism Review published an article about Apple's aggressive behavior toward journalists to maintain secrecy, referencing the Gizmodo case, but also three lawsuits Apple filed against bloggers for reporting on leaked trade secrets.

The following year, Wired reported that Apple employees allegedly posed as San Francisco Police Department (SFPD) officers to search a home for a lost iPhone prototype left at a bar, which Apple tracked with GPS. Four plain-clothed SFPD officers accompanied two Apple investigators to the home. Three officers flashed their badges and announced they were the police, but the investigators did not identify themselves as Apple employees. The resident presumed they were all officers and allowed the investigators to search the home. The resident did not know anything about the device. One Apple investigator was later identified as a former police sergeant. No report was ever filed and there is no public record of the visit. Time and The New York Times referred to the incident as "sketchy" and Time asked, "Does Apple have its own secret mafia?"

Employees have said that Apple's secrecy policies conflate legally-protected speech such as working conditions with protecting product development. The National Labor Relations Board (NLRB) made a statement that Apple's rules and communication around secrecy violate federal labor laws after a recording of an employee townhall, which detailed workplace conditions, was leaked to the press. Tim Cook sent employees follow-up memo that said they were doing "everything in our power to identify those who leaked," that "people who leak confidential information do not belong here," and "whether it’s product IP or the details of a confidential meeting." An employee who asked questions at the townhall and was known for activism at the company was investigated for the leak and subsequently fired after she deleted materials from her work devices.

== Data privacy, transparency, and fair use ==
=== AI training data sources and transparency ===
In 2005, four voice actors, including Susan Bennett, made voice recordings as part of a database owned by Scansoft and licensed by Apple. None of them were compensated or told what the project was for.

In 2017, Apple announced Face ID as a neural network technology that was private and safe because it was stored locally on the device and never uploaded to the cloud. The Verge questioned Apple's intent for future uses of the data. Minnesota senator Al Franken questioned the privacy and security implications, asking about the source of Apple’s facial training data (reported to exceed one billion images), the diversity of the dataset, and how Apple planned to respond to law‑enforcement requests for facial data. Apple noted in their response, "We worked with participants from around the world to include a representative group of people accounting for gender, age, ethnicity and other factors," and that studies were conducted with informed consent. In August 2021, The Verge published "Apple cares about privacy, unless you work at Apple," which detailed an internal tool called "Glimmer" (formerly "Gobbler") employees used to test Face ID. One employee later suggested the billion images came from Apple's dogfooding, a practice CEO Steve Jobs started in the 1980s. In 2020, Apple said they 3D scanned hundreds of ears for the development of the AirPods in user studies which invited participation of Apple employees.

In 2024, Apple announced the introduction of its generative artificial intelligence feature, Apple Intelligence. The company came under criticism from some artists and publishers who expressed concern about a lack of transparency in the sources used for AI training data. According to Apple, data collection is conducted using its proprietary web crawler, AppleBot, which is designed to respect publisher preferences set in robots.txt files. However, some media outlets have questioned the effectiveness of this opt-out system, arguing that it places the responsibility on publishers and questioning whether data can be fully retracted from training sets once collected. CNN criticized the procedure saying it places the burden on publishers to safeguard their data from Apple. Earlier in the year, Apple apologized for a "dystopian" advertisement for the iPad, which crushed art tools and musical instruments with a hydraulic press, after the ad was widely criticized by artists.

=== Copyright and patent infringement ===
In 2012, multiple groups of Chinese writers were awarded compensation of over $200,000 from Apple for hosting apps that contained unlicensed versions of their books, according to Chinese state media. Also in 2012, a US district judge ruled that Apple infringed on The Tetris Company's copyrights when it cloned Tetris into a game called Mino.

In 2023, Dan Ackerman sued Apple alleging that the film Tetris copied material from his 2016 book The Tetris Effect.

In 2022 and 2023, the United States International Trade Commission ruled that Apple had infringed on health company AliveCor's electrocardiogram technology and Masimo's blood oxygen sensor patent on the Apple Watch. AliveCor's antitrust lawsuit was dismissed in 2024.

=== Device scanning and recording ===
In 2019, Apple contractor Thomas le Bonniec filed complaints with European privacy regulators and went to the press with allegations that Apple had been recording, storing, and using audio of its consumers without their knowledge or consent using Siri. In 2020, Apple apologized and suspended the program. They were ordered to pay $95 million to settle a class action lawsuit related to the practice.

In 2022, Apple scrapped a plan to scan iCloud for child pornography, which received widespread criticism for its privacy and surveillance implications.

=== Safari IP address leaks ===
Apple Inc. has been sending the IP addresses of Safari users in China to Tencent Safe Browsing since 2019. Since 2022, Apple Inc. has also been sending the IP addresses of Safari users in Hong Kong to Tencent, while Google Safe Browsing is not blocked by the Government of Hong Kong.

== Environmental impact ==
Apple’s environmental record has attracted both positive and negative attention. The company has been commended for reducing hazardous substances in its products and transitioning towards renewable energy, but criticized for its opposition to right to repair legislation and concerns over electronic waste generation. Environmental authorities, including the United States Environmental Protection Agency (EPA), have fined Apple for improper hazardous waste handling. In June 2024, an EPA report found potential violations of the Resource Conservation and Recovery Act at one of Apple's facilities in Santa Clara, California.

== Government surveillance and censorship ==
Leaked National Security Agency documents obtained by The Guardian and The Washington Post in June 2013 included Apple in the list of American companies that allegedly cooperate with PRISM, which authorizes the US government to secretly access data of non-American citizens hosted by American companies without a warrant. Following the leak, US government officials acknowledged the existence of the program. According to the leaked documents, the NSA has direct access to servers of those companies, and the amount of data collected through the program had been growing fast in years prior to the leak. Apple has denied having any knowledge of the program.

In 2019, The Atlantic published the article "Apple’s Empty Grandstanding About Privacy," which alleged that Apple enables surveillance while the CEO claims that "privacy is a fundamental human right."

Apple has given governments data related to push notifications.

Apple has been criticized for censorship in compliance with authoritarian governments around the world, including during 2020 Belarusian protests, during the 2022 COVID-19 protests in China, the 2019–2020 Hong Kong protests, the 2021 Russian legislative election, the annexation of Crimea by the Russian Federation, and for filtering out terms like "democracy" and "human rights" for iPhone engravings in Chinese and banning Muslim content from the App Store. Apple has also been criticized for censoring various media in the United States including books, music, podcasts, newspaper articles, and television shows.

Apple Inc. has been sharing the IP addresses of Safari users in mainland China with Tencent Safe Browsing since at least 2019. Apple originally said the Tencent blocklist would be used only for Safari users in mainland China. However, after 24 November 2022, Apple quietly edited its Safari privacy policy to note the Tencent blacklist would be used for devices in Hong Kong as well, while Google is not yet blocked by the Government of Hong Kong, unlike mainland China. In 2022, Hong Kong former Apple Inc. senior software engineer Chu Ka-cheong discovered that Apple Safari blocked GitLab in mainland China and Hong Kong due to Tencent's blacklist, which labeled GitLab, a California-based American software company and the first partly Ukrainian unicorn, as containing dangerous "misinformation." Maciej Stachowiak, who is the leader of Apple WebKit, replied with “we will look into it.”

== Labor conditions ==
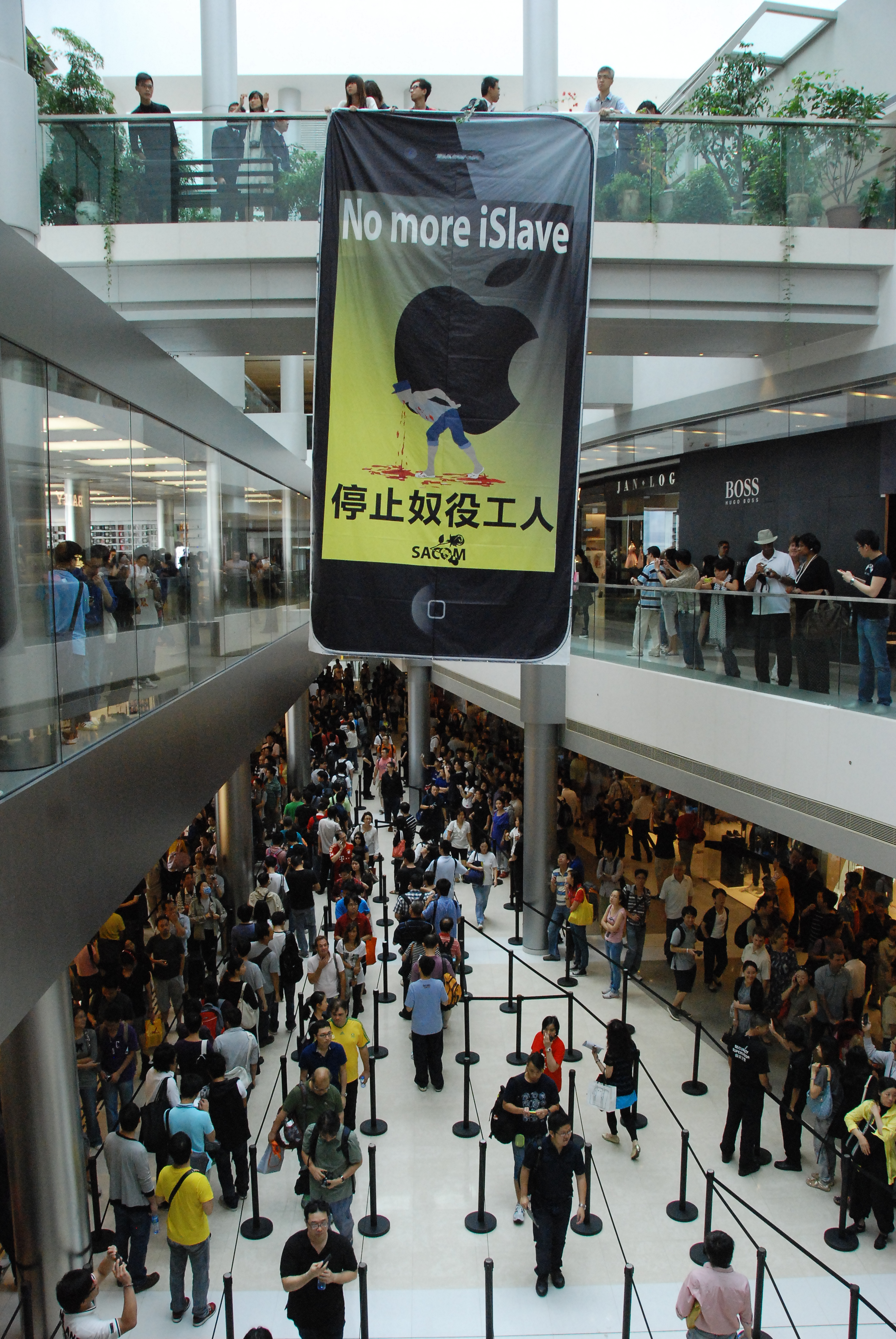
SACOM protests in 2013 at the opening of the first Apple Store in Hong Kong over labor rights violations in its supplier factories Foxconn and Wintek

Apple workers around the globe have been involved in organizing since the 1990s. Apple unions are made up of retail, corporate, and outsourced workers. Apple employees have joined trade unions and or formed works councils in Australia, France, Germany, Italy, Japan, the United Kingdom and the United States.

The majority of industrial labor disputes (including union recognition) involving Apple occur indirectly through its suppliers and contractors, notably Foxconn plants in China, and, to a lesser extent, in Brazil and India.

=== Privacy and surveillance ===
Corporate employees have criticized Apple's employee privacy rules, including a rule that says that employees have "no expectation of privacy" when using a personal device to conduct Apple-related business. They also spoke out about a practice of being discouraged from keeping a separate device for work and are expected to test software with informed consent. Retail employees involved in unionizing used Android phones due to surveillance concerns from software Apple installs on employee devices and practices such as bag checks. An employee filed a lawsuit against the company in California in December 2024 for its employee privacy practices.

=== Diversity, equity, and inclusion ===
Apple has been criticized for a lack of diversity and a culture of sexual harassment and mishandling of complaints by human resources and management. In particular, wage gaps and the failure to promote women into leadership have been criticized since the early 1990s. In 2022, Apple removed concealment clauses from its employment agreements after a practice of offering severance in exchange for non-disclosure agreements was reported by Financial Times, corroborated by a third-party audit, and reported to the U.S. Securities and Exchange Commission. Employees remarked that it was a part of Apple's culture of secrecy. A gender pay bias and sexual harassment lawsuit was filed in June 2024 seeking class status.

=== Contract manufacturers ===
Apple manufactures most of its products in China through partners like Foxconn. Apple's decision to outsource its manufacturing has received significant criticism, due to allegations of poor working conditions, long work hours, and other labor rights violations. A total of 18 suicide attempts were recorded at the Foxconn facility in 2010, with 14 attempts resulting in deaths. At least one suicide was due to the company's culture of secrecy after the worker lost a prototype. The Guardian reported that an audit of Apple’s supply chain found that two‑thirds of its factories did not properly compensate workers, lacked adequate safety and environmental credentials, and included several instances of 15‑year‑old workers.

Apple, Foxconn and Chinese workers are stakeholders in high-technology production, but relations between the three are perceived by analysts as imbalanced. Apple was able to capture 58.5 percent of the value of the iPhone, despite the fact that the manufacture of the product is entirely outsourced. Particularly notable is that labor costs in China account for the smallest share: 1.8 percent, or nearly US$10, of the US$549 retail price. While both Apple and Foxconn rely on Chinese workers to perform 12-hour working days to meet demand, the costs of Chinese labor in processing and assembly are insignificant in the overall commercial success of Apple. Other major component providers—such as Samsung and LG—captured slightly over 14 percent of the value of the iPhone, while the cost of raw materials was just over one-fifth of the total value (21.9 percent).

In 2020, The Information published "Apple Took Three Years to Cut Ties With Supplier That Used Underage Labor," an article which detailed the company's reluctance to sever partnerships in their supply chain, even when they violate its ethics policies using child labor. Also in 2020, report by the Australian Strategic Policy Institute listed Apple as a company that was "potentially directly or indirectly benefiting" from forced Uyghur labor. In 2020, Apple lobbyists tried to weaken the Uyghur Forced Labor Prevention Act, a U.S. bill against forced labor in Xinjiang, China.

=== Conflict minerals and cobalt suppliers ===
An Amnesty International report on cobalt mining in the Democratic Republic of the Congo linked Apple to suppliers using child labor, some children as young as seven in 2016. The following year, The Washington Post reported Apple's intention to stop buying cobalt from the region until conditions were improved. Victims of child labor in the cobalt mines attempted to sue Apple and other technology companies, but were dismissed by the courts on procedural grounds. In 2023, an investigation into corporate technology supply chains carried out by The Independent found that Apple was among 400 companies associated with the Responsible Minerals Initiative (RMI) to root out child labor and human rights violations. Issues reported ranged from mines burying workers alive—including children—to sexual assault and birth defects caused by exposure to toxins. RMI said that the audits do not include site visits, despite being aware of the conditions at mines. Siddharth Kara, author of Cobalt Red, told The Independent, "there’s not much happening of any merit to assist the people of the Congo in addressing the human rights and environmental violations taking place every day as a consequence of cobalt mining." The Congolese government threatened legal action against Apple in 2024, later alleging they had evidence linking Apple to conflict areas.

== Marketing ==
In July 2024, Apple released the short commercial film The Underdogs: Out of Office, which promoted Apple products' usage for businesses abroad. The commercial was set and filmed in Bangkok, Thailand. The film follows three employees from a paper‑box manufacturer who are sent to Thailand to find a business partner. Facing struggles and difficulties, they were able to find their way through with assistance from their Apple devices. The film depicts the characters’ U.S. office in cool tones to suggest modernity, while using vintage filters to portray Thailand as an underdeveloped ‘third‑world’ state, including scenes of the airport, accommodations, and transport that critics said did not reflect the country’s current level of development. The film received criticism from the Thai public and foreigners, both residents and previous visitors, as "a stereotypical and dated portrayal of Thai society". On August 2, 2024, Apple apologized and removed access to the film on YouTube.

== Security practices ==
Apple's advertising has promoted a perception that its products are more secure than others. Apple has claimed that its products are less likely to be breached by hackers or infected by viruses or malware, while critics argue this is mainly because attackers show less interest in targeting Apple devices. A 2006 report by McAfee found a 228% increase of the annual rate of vulnerabilities in Apple's products in 2003–2005, more than three times that of Microsoft's. The public's lack of awareness over the security vulnerabilities of Apple products has created criticism over Apple misleading the public. In 2022, hackers exploited a security flaw to take full control of devices including the Mac. Security experts believe that Apple plays down security concerns, does not pay researchers on par with the industry, and is slow to acknowledge and fix reported security bugs.

CNET said Apple's delay to fix security flaws puts users at risk and attributed it to the company's culture of secrecy. In 2011, Apple took nearly three years to fix the vulnerability that led to the exploit of the FinFisher trojan. Apple took six months to update a security flaw in Java, far longer than other companies, drawing sharp criticism by experts and journalists. It took five months to fix security flaw in Find My, reported by a former Apple security engineer. Apple's AirTag was identified as a stalking vector upon launch in 2021, on a much larger scale than similar products from Tile. In 2024, a judge denied Apple's motion to dismiss a lawsuit on behalf of stalking victims who allege that Apple has not done enough to "diminish the ability of stalkers to use AirTags effectively".

== Taxes ==
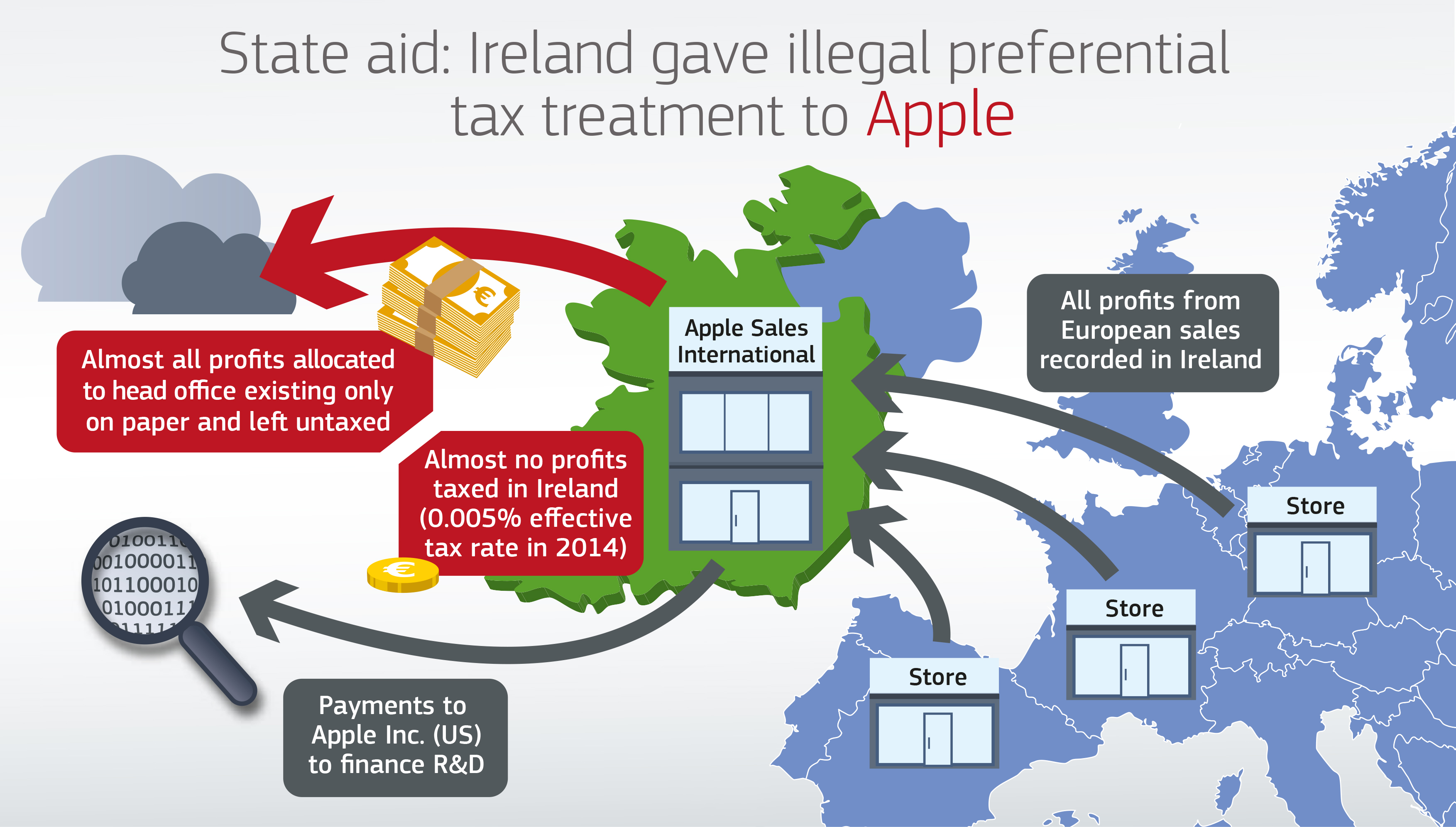
The EU Commission's diagram of Apple's "Double Irish" BEPS tool

Apple has created subsidiaries in low-tax places such as Ireland, the Netherlands, Luxembourg, and the British Virgin Islands to cut the taxes it pays around the world. According to The New York Times, in the 1980s Apple was among the first tech companies to designate overseas salespeople in high-tax countries in a manner that allowed the company to sell on behalf of low-tax subsidiaries on other continents, sidestepping income taxes. In the late 1980s, Apple was a pioneer of an accounting technique known as the "Double Irish with a Dutch sandwich", which reduces taxes by routing profits through Irish subsidiaries and the Netherlands and then to the Caribbean.

There is a decade-long dispute between Apple and the European Commission regarding the tax arrangements between Apple and Ireland, which allowed the company to pay close to zero corporate tax over 10 years. In September 2024, The European Court of Justice ruled that Apple must pay $14.3 billion (€13 billion) in back taxes, determining that Ireland's tax breaks to the company were unlawful. This decision reverses a 2020 ruling that favoured Apple and Ireland, covering profits earned by Apple's Dublin units from 1991 to 2014. The unpaid taxes had been placed in an escrow account since 2018.

== See also ==
- Apple in China
- Pentalobe screw
