= Apple and unions =

Apple-related worker organizations and unions

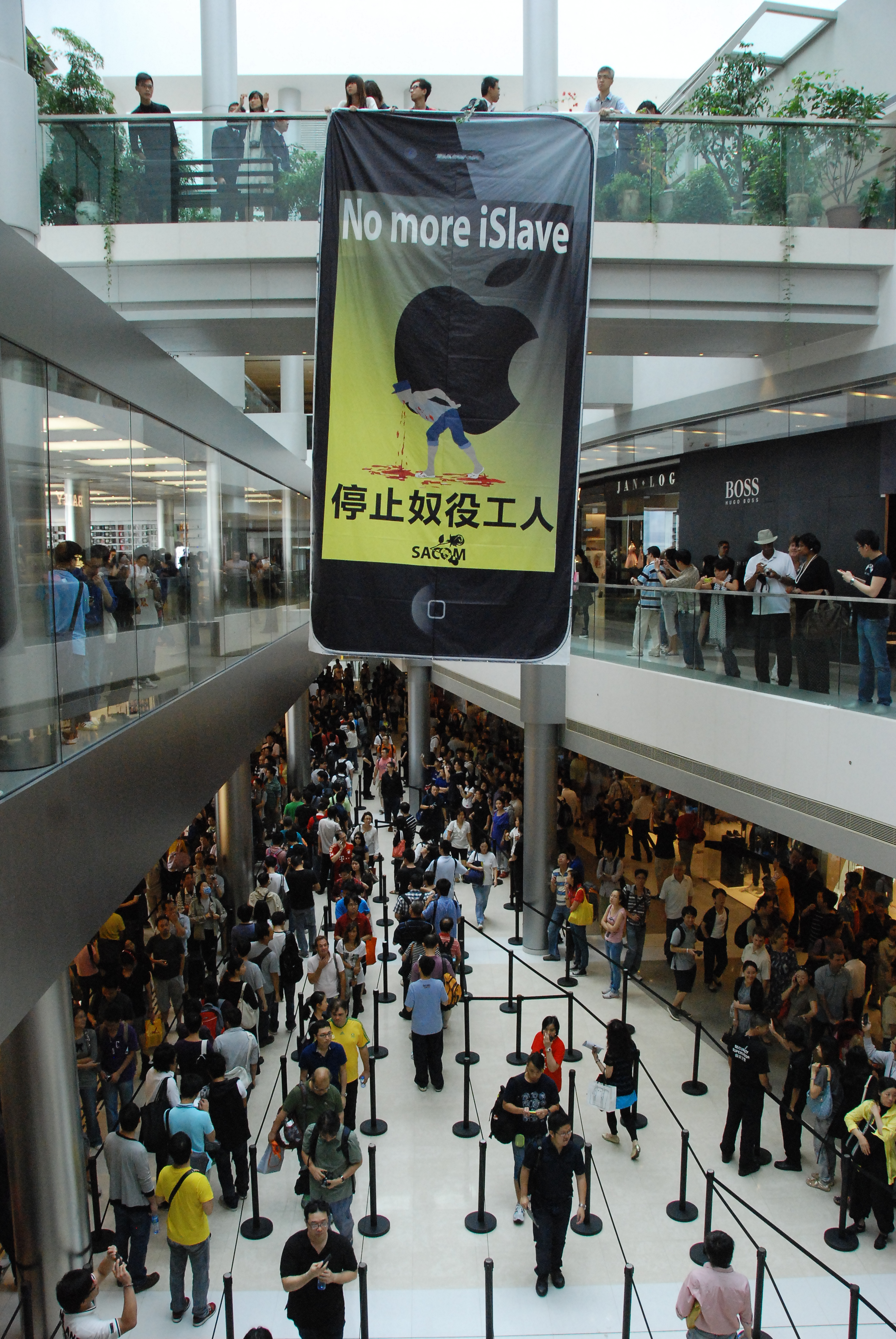
SACOM protests in 2013 at the opening of the first Apple Store in Hong Kong over labor rights violations in its supplier factories Foxconn and Wintek

Apple workers around the globe have been involved in organizing since the 1990s. Apple unions are made up of retail, corporate, and outsourced workers. Apple employees have joined trade unions and or formed works councils in Australia, France, Germany, Italy, Japan, the United Kingdom and the United States.

The majority of industrial labor disputes (including union recognition) involving Apple occur indirectly through its suppliers and contractors, notably Foxconn plants in China, and, to a lesser extent, in Brazil and India.

In 2021, Apple Together, a solidarity union, sought to bring together the company's global worker organizations. In the 2020s, a surge in new organizing took place in Australia, United Kingdom and the United States.

== Industrial composition ==
Apple was founded in 1976, and has become one of the most valuable corporations in the world, being valued over $1 trillion in 2018, and in 2020 becoming the first American company to be valued over $2 trillion. Since the 1980s, Apple, like other Silicon Valley companies, shifted assembly operations and other manufacturing services from the United States to countries with lower labor, overhead costs and flexible scaling. Apple directly employs 147,000 workers including 25,000 corporate employees in Apple Park and across Silicon Valley. The vast majority of its employees work at 500 retail Apple stores globally.

Apple relies on a larger, outsourced workforce for manufacturing, particularly in China. As of 2021, Apple uses hardware components from 43 different countries. The majority of assembling is done by Taiwanese original design manufacturer firms Foxconn, Pegatron, Wistron and Compal Electronics in factories primarily located inside China, and to a lesser extent, Foxconn plants in Brazil, and India.

== Australia ==
Apple Australia employs 4,000 employees. On October 18, 2022, 150 retail workers from one of Apple's three unions in Australia, represented by Retail and Fast Food Workers Union, went on strike over pay and benefits in Brisbane, Chermside, and Charlestown. Other unionized workers in Australia are represented by the Shop, Distributive and Allied Employees Association and Australian Services Union.

== Brazil ==
In 2012, Foxconn opened a second Foxconn factory in Jundiaí, Brazil, the first plant to focus exclusively on assembling Apple products. The Brazilian Metalworkers Union (Confederação Nacional dos Trabalhadores Metalúrgicos; CNTM) affiliated to IndustriALL had previous experience organizing Foxconn workers at the first non-Apple plant that was established in 2007. After a 5-day strike in 2014 involving 3,700 workers, Foxconn made a collective agreement with the Metalworkers Union to match the salaries of the newer Apple contract workers with the better paid Foxconn workers of the non-Apple focused plant. A prior strike happened in February 2013 over similar demands.

== China ==
In China, Apple directly employs 10,000 workers across its retail and corporate divisions. In addition, one further million workers are contracted by Apple's suppliers to assemble Apple products, including Foxconn and Pegatron. The Foxconn Zhengzhou Technology Park alone employs 350,000 Chinese workers in Zhengzhou to exclusively work on the iPhone.

Pegatron workers are not represented by any trade union, according to a 2015 China Labor Watch report.

Despite Foxconn being the largest 'unionized' company in the world, with 90% of the 1.4 million workforce registered; the Foxconn Federation of Labour Unions (Chinese: 富士康科技集团工会联合会), more commonly known as the Foxconn Trade Union (Chinese: 富士康工会) is by and large a company union dominated by management rather than workers.

Foxconn made global headlines in 2010, when over a dozen workers committed suicide in iPhone factories, due to strenuous working conditions. Apple responded by bringing in the Fair Labor Association (FLA), a US based NGO as an external auditor from 2012 to 2016. One of FLA's findings was that the Foxconn Trade Union failed to adequately represent workers. The Economic Policy Institute criticized the FLA report for giving Apple and Foxconn 'undue' credit, despite ongoing issues including forced overtime and the continued use of underage labor. Foxconn promised in 2013 with the help of FLA to prepare genuine representative elections through an anonymous voting process to elect up to 18,000 new union committees.

A 2017 Students and Scholars Against Corporate Misbehaviour report criticized the limited worker participation inside the Foxconn Trade Union and the lack of awareness or involvement of workers in the first democratic union elections Foxconn held in early 2015.

== France ==
Apple has 20 retail stores in France, 9 in Paris, as of 2023. Apple employees are represented by four trade-unions, CGT, Unsa, CFDT and Cidre-CFTC.

Ahead of the iPhone 5 debut in 2012, employees in French Apple retail stores voted to go on strike after collective bargaining negotiations stalled. Solidaires, the main trade union involved represents 25% of the 1,000 French employees.

== Germany ==
In February 2012, the first works council in Germany was established in the Munich Apple retail store. In an interview with Manager Magazin, a ver.di union representative cited excessive overtime, high noise level and insufficient health measures as motivating factors for workers to form a works council, as well as the lack of any collective agreements. In December, retail workers at the Frankfurt Apple store elected a works council, the second one in Germany, making the establishment of a Germany wide General Works Council mandatory. A third works council was elected in the Jungfernstieg Apple store in Hamburg in early March 2013. In September 2013, another works council was formed in Augsburg.

== India ==
Apple expanded in India by manufacturing iPhones through its Wistron contract manufacturer, located near Bangalore.

Foxconn, which was present in India since 2006, explored setting up iPhone production in India as early as 2010, but scrapped plans in favor of opening a new plant in Brazil. Apple expanded production in 2019 in Chennai through contract manufacturers Pegatron and Foxconn in the special economic zone located in Sriperumbudur.

On December 17, 2021, 250 women workers at the iPhone Foxconn plant were medically treated for food poisoning, with productions halted on December 18. Nearly 3,000 workers blocked the highway to the factory, leading to 167 workers being detained for 24 hours, including trade union officials from Centre of Indian Trade Unions.

== Italy ==
Ahead of the iPhone 4S launch in 2011, workers in the Rome Apple retail store went on strike, featuring the slogan "Strike Different", a play on "Think Different". Strike demands included higher monthly bonus schemes of US$200, limiting employee surveillance and increasing staffing.

In 2013, three Italian trade unions FILCAMS-CGIL, FISASCAT and UILTuCS signed the first collective agreement with Apple in Italy representing 1,300 workers across 14 Apple stores and improved working conditions compared to the existing national retail collective agreement.

== Japan ==
On December 18, 2014, retail workers of Apple Japan announced a union affiliated with Tozen using the slogan "Work Different". Three of Japan's ten Apple stores are unionized with Tozen.

== Spain ==
Workers in six Apple stores in Spain are members of syndicalist unions. Five of the stores are affiliated with General Confederation of Labor (CGT), while the Passeig de Gràcia store in Barcelona is affiliated with Confederación Nacional del Trabajo (CNT).

== United Kingdom ==
In June 2022, after joining GMB Scotland, retail workers at the Buchanan Street Apple store, one of two Apple's Glasgow stores filed paperwork to unionize, the first in the United Kingdom to do so. In November, Apple voluntarily recognized the Glasgow Apple union. On February 8, 2023, Apple signed a collective agreement with the store, the first Apple store to do so in the United Kingdom.

In July 2022, United Tech and Allied Workers Union (UTAW), affiliated with the Communications Workers Union organized a day of action in two London Apple stores on Regent Street and Covent Garden. UTAW claims to have members working in Apple stores in Exeter, Manchester, Brighton, and Norwich. On December 12, 2022, White City, London Apple store workers unionized with UTAW.

== United States ==
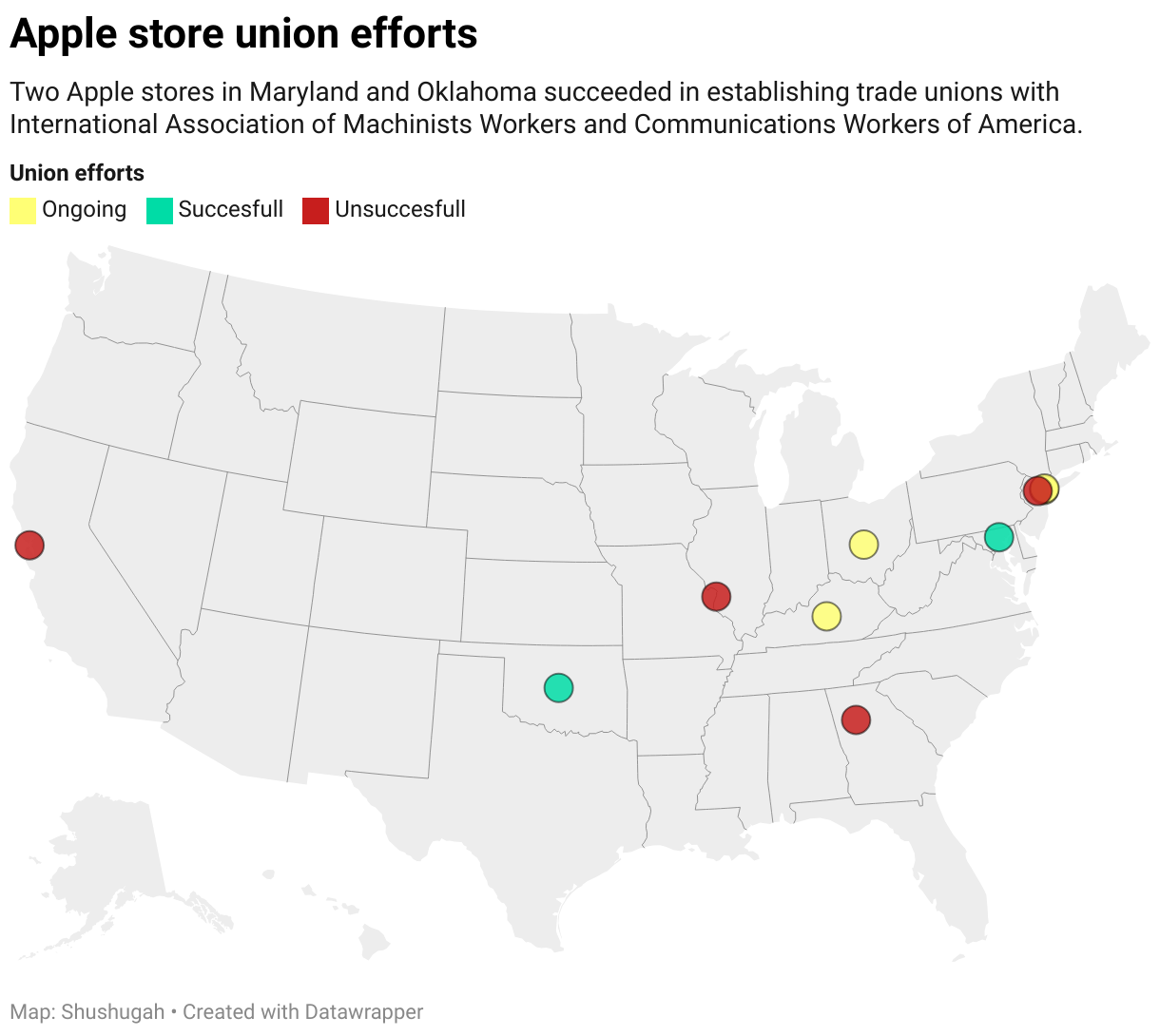
Map of union election efforts at 10 different Apple Stores in the United States

As of 2019, Apple directly employs 90,000 employees in the United States, including 25,000 corporate employees in Apple Park and across the west coast. In 1990 Employees for One Apple was the first organized worker initiative, in protest of changes to employee profit sharing. In 2011 an unsuccessful unionization effort was launched by Cory Moll in the San Francisco retail store. In 2021 the #AppleToo initiative launched, publishing over 500 stories of worker experiences with harassment. One year later, #AppleToo evolved into Apple Together, a network of different Apple Unions.

The vast majority of the 270 Apple retail stores are not unionized. Apple hired Littler Mendelson law firm, known for their "anti-union" stance, to represent Apple in 2022.

For the first time ever, in 2022, two stores unionized in Maryland and Oklahoma with the support of International Association of Machinists and Aerospace Workers (IAM) and Communications Workers of America (CWA) respectively. Workers at the Towson Mall store in Maryland approved the first collective agreement on August 6, 2024. (That store was closed along with locations in Trumbull, Connecticut and Escondito, California on April 6, 2026.) Additional unionization efforts are underway in New York (Grand Central and World Trade Center), Kentucky and Ohio. There were unsuccessful and or cancelled efforts in California, New Jersey, Georgia and Missouri.

=== Employees for One Apple ===
In January 1990, following an announcement to cut employee profit sharing, workers on an internal network bulletin board system who had previously organized around affirmative action, recycling, and smoking on campus, "literally swamped" the system in protest of the changes, resulting in management walking back the changes. One employee compiled a list of participants in the profit sharing revolt and wrote to each of them forming a small group that soon merged with another recently formed group: the "concerned employees' league."

The initial group of 50 workers using the name "Employees for One Apple" met in May 1990 and sought a restoration of the company's former "corporate culture," more direct communications with executives, a flattened hierarchy including distinctions and perks between management and employees, more influence over company decisions, and an "institutionalized voice" for employees. Management agreed to the formation of an "Employee-Executive Forum" consisting of 15 randomly selected employees, allowed to meet quarterly with management to discuss their concerns.

In June 1991, the group, which had grown to 500 members, organized a rally outside of one of the Cupertino, California offices in protest of forthcoming mass layoff as part of the company's cost-cutting plan. Workers demanded executives take pay-cuts as part of the cutbacks. In the days following the rally, CEO John Sculley announced a 15 percent pay cut, along with other top executive pay cuts. The group said they were considering unionization, a stance in contrast with their original opposition to unions. In 1997, CEO Gil Amelio fired 4,100 workers with severance to cut costs. One fired worker said the company's biggest problem was mismanagement.

=== Unionization efforts ===
In early 2022, employees reported that recent compensation adjustments from the company had backfired, with many reporting their raises were not enough to cover inflation. One worker told The Post, "I have a lot of co-workers and friends who I genuinely love and they do not make enough to get by." Others have criticized that while the company used to pay competitively, it has not been reflective of the record profits reported throughout the COVID-19 pandemic, as described in a Medium post by an Ohio worker, Matt Herbst.

Organizers alleged that since they started union activity, managers had begun surveilling workers and giving anti-union speeches. Rebecca Kolins Givan, an associate professor at Rutgers University warned that union busting activity by Apple against organizers could "tarnish" their brand.

In May 2022, Vice shared a leaked memo, allegedly proving that Apple is training Apple Store managers to persuade employees against unionization. Apple hired Littler Mendelson law firm, known for their "anti-union" stance, to represent Apple.

==== Apple Retail Workers Union ====
In May 2011, exactly one decade after the first Apple store opened, Cory Moll launched the Apple Retail Workers Union in San Francisco, California, citing compensation, pay, benefits and hiring processes as motivations. In November, Apple launched a private training for managers on how to "manage worker unions". A source contacted CNET News to clarify that the training was not related to retail employees. In April 2013, according to a tweet Moll posted, Moll left the company on his own accord.

==== Apple Together ====
Apple Together logo

Apple Together is a solidarity union, or a "global network of solidarity between [Apple] unions," made up of corporate and retail workers, founded by Cher Scarlett, Janneke Parrish, and other anonymous Apple workers. The website states that it is the evolution of the #AppleToo movement using the phrase "From #AppleToo to Apple Together", and the group has used the tagline "Think Equitable".

On December 24, 2021, Christmas Eve, the group staged a walkout in some retail stores and called for a consumer boycott, urging the public not to shop at the retailer on the busy holiday shopping day. The group set out a list of demands on Twitter, including hazard pay, living wages, benefits for part-time workers, and several specific requests due to the COVID-19 pandemic, such as N95 masks and sanitization stations, and more strict rules around customer interactions. The walkout involved at least 50 retail employees across stores from three states, and comes following news of retail conditions around mental health issues, subpar wages, customer abuse, and poor management of the COVID-19 pandemic. The walkout started at the Jacksonville, Florida retail store, where recent aggression from customers had been ignored by the store's management.

On April 29, 2022, the group wrote an open letter to corporate management speaking out against the company's return-to-office plans asking for more flexibility around working remotely, pointing to what the group alleged would have an adverse impact on the company's diversity.

The corporate employees reportedly supported retail efforts to unionize, including by donating funds via The Solidarity Fund for organizing efforts. Several union representatives "hang out" in the union's Discord server to assist in unionizing efforts. As of May 2022, Scarlett and Parrish were members of the union as advisors.

==== Apple Retail Union ====
In 2022, Communications Workers of America (CWA) launched an effort to help Apple retail stores unionize. The campaign is a part of Campaign to Organize Digital Employees, CWA's effort to unionize tech and gaming.

On April 20, 2022, the first Apple store in the United States filed a petition for union recognition with the NLRB. The store is located in Atlanta, Georgia and of the 30% of authorization cards required for the 107-employee location in Cumberland Mall, the workers gathered 70%. The union, led by Derrick Bowles and Sydney Rhodes, refers to themselves as "Apple Workers Union". The vote was scheduled to take place on June 2, 2022, but was later withdrawn after what workers alleged to be "intimidation". In December, the NLRB corroborated that Apple violated federal labor law.

In May 2022, CWA filed an unfair labor practice report against Apple, claiming the company held captive audience meetings to counter unionization efforts. The same month, CWA filed another complaint, alleging Apple interrogated workers about labor activity, prohibited the posting of pro-union flyers and held mandatory anti-union presentations at the World Trade Center store in Manhattan, New York. In September, the NLRB issued a complaint against Apple alleging discrimination against union supporters and interrogating staff, which Apple denied.

On May 25, 2022, workers at Oxmoor Center in Louisville, Kentucky announced their union drive with CWA.

On February 21, 2022, retail workers at the Apple store in Grand Central Terminal, in New York City, voted to affiliate themselves with Workers United under the name "Fruit Stand Workers United". An organizer had reached out to Cher Scarlett "distraught" after the union's prior partnership had unexpectedly dissolved. Scarlett, who had previously worked for Starbucks, was helping unionize the coffee chain and connected the organizers to her Workers United contact, reviving the effort. In April 2022, the workers began gathering signatures to file a petition for union representation with the NLRB. In June 2022, a press release by Workers United announced that CWA's Apple Retail Union will take over supporting Fruit Stand Workers United.

In September 2022, workers at Apple's Penn Square store in Oklahoma, filed a petition with the NLRB to hold a union election. The following month, they became the second unionized Apple store in the country with workers voting 56–32 in favor of unionizing.

In Columbus, Ohio in the Easton Town Center store, Apple circulated fliers promoting "a dedicated working group that can be used as a formal means for employees and leaders to provide feedback on both local and retail organization-wide initiatives, policies and practices." In response, CWA filed a complaint with the NLRB on December 16, 2022, alleging that Apple interfered with unionization efforts by setting up its own pseudo-union controlled by the employer.

In Short Hills, New Jersey, Apple workers voted 57–41 against forming a union with CWA, on 11 May 2024. It the third union election, followed by the two successful elections in Maryland and Oklahoma.

==== AppleCore ====
On May 3, 2022, Apple employees working at the Genius Bar at Towson Mall in Baltimore, Maryland sent a letter to CEO Tim Cook notifying the company of their intention to file for union recognition with the NLRB called the Coalition of Organized Retail Employees, or AppleCore. The union is affiliated with International Association of Machinists and Aerospace Workers (IAM). The workers filed a petition with the NLRB on May 4, 2022, and voted 65–33 to join the union on June 18, 2022, becoming the first unionized Apple store in the nation. A majority of the 85-employee bargaining unit approved the first collective agreement at any Apple store on August 6, 2024. The agreement would include a 10% salary increase over 3-years and new rules related to scheduling, sub-contracting, and severance. On April 9, 2026, Apple announced that it would be permanently closing its Towson Mall store in June, along with two other stores located in Trumbull, Connecticut and Escondito, California.

On November 16, 2022, IAM petitioned the NLRB to represent 83 Apple employees at the Galleria Apple store in St. Louis, Missouri. On November 23, 2022, the IAM withdrew its unionization petition from the NLRB, citing a hostile environment, while a published statement and union-withdrawal petition by Apple workers contradicted IAM stating they did not wish to work with IAM.

== See also ==
- Amazon worker organization
- IBM and unions
- Google worker organization
- REI worker organization
- History of Apple Inc.
