= Apple supply chain =

As of 2018, Apple used components from 43 countries. The majority of assembling is done by Taiwanese original design manufacturer firms Foxconn, Pegatron, Wistron and Compal Electronics with factories mostly located inside China, but also Brazil, and India.

Apple has been able to capture more than half of the value of the iPhone, despite the fact that the manufacture of the product is entirely outsourced. Labor costs in China account for the smallest share: 1.8 percent. Other major component providers—such as Samsung and LG—have captured slightly over 14 percent of the value of the iPhone, while the cost of raw materials being just over one-fifth of the total value .

Several product leaks have come from Apple's supply chain rather than its corporate offices, leading Apple to reinforce its secrecy measures.

Apple's decision to outsource its manufacturing has received significant criticism, due to allegations of poor working conditions, long work hours, and other labor rights violations. In response, Apple launched its Supplier Responsibility program, which aimed to improve Apple's oversight of supplier partners and enforce its ethics policies. It has also attempted to introduce greater diversification into its supply chain by sourcing products from other countries.

== Geographic distribution ==
As of 2021, Apple uses components from 43 countries. The majority of assembling is done by Taiwanese original design manufacturer firms Foxconn, Pegatron, Wistron and Compal Electronics with factories mostly located inside China, but also Brazil, and India.

=== Taiwan ===
Taiwan Semiconductor Manufacturing Co., (TSMC) is a pure-play semiconductor manufacturing company. They make the majority of Apple's smartphone SoCs, with Samsung Semiconductor, playing a minority role. Apple, alone accounted for over 25% of TSMC's total income in 2021. Apple's Bionic lineup of smartphone SoCs, are currently made exclusively by TSMC from the A11 bionic onward, previously manufacturing was shared with Samsung. The M series of Apple SoC for consumer computers and tablets is made by TSMC.

=== China ===
Apple's considerable commercial success is partly attributable to the outsourcing of its consumer electronics production to Asia. Apple's manufacturers have relied on China's "floating population" of 200 million migrants.

During the 2022 COVID-19 protests in China, Chinese state-owned company Wingtech was reported by The Wall Street Journal to gain an additional foothold in Apple's supply chain following protests at a Foxconn factory in the Zhengzhou Airport Economy Zone.

In China's A-shares market, it is an established strategy to invest in companies along the Apple supply chain such as Lens Technology (which manufactures glass for iPhones), Ofilm (which manufactures camera modules), Goertek (which makes acoustic units) and Desai Battery.

=== India ===
Apple has gradually expanded its efforts in getting its products into the Indian market. In July 2012, during a conference call with investors, CEO Tim Cook said that he "[loves] India", but that Apple saw larger opportunities outside the region. India's requirement that 30% of products sold be manufactured in the country was described as "really adds cost to getting product to market". In May 2016, Apple opened an iOS app development center in Bangalore and a maps development office for 4,000 staff in Hyderabad. In March, The Wall Street Journal reported that Apple would begin manufacturing iPhone models in India "over the next two months", and in May, the Journal wrote that an Apple manufacturer had begun production of the iPhone SE in the country, while Apple told CNBC that the manufacturing was for a "small number" of units. In April 2019, Apple initiated manufacturing of the iPhone 7 at its Bengaluru facility, keeping in mind demand from local customers even as they seek more incentives from the government of India. At the beginning of 2020, Tim Cook announced that Apple schedules the opening of its first physical outlet in India for 2021, while an online store is to be launched by the end of the year. The opening of the Apple Store was postponed, and finally took place in April 2023, while the online store was launched in September 2020.

=== United States ===
In May 2017, the company announced a $1-billion funding project for "advanced manufacturing" in the United States, and subsequently invested $200 million in Corning Inc., a manufacturer of toughened Gorilla Glass technology used in Apple's iPhones. The following December, Apple's chief operating officer, Jeff Williams, told CNBC that the "$1 billion" amount was "absolutely not" the final limit on its spending.

=== Other ===
French company, Eldim assisted with the development of "Face ID" facial recognition system for the iPhone X.

== Controversies ==
=== Contract manufacturers ===
Apple's supply chain has reportedly used child labor and potentially involved forced Uyghur labor. Apple has taken steps to maintain those controversial sources of labor.

Workers who assemble iPhones, iPads, and other devices often labor under harsh conditions. According to company reports and advocacy, Apple's suppliers in China have improperly disposed of hazardous waste and falsified records. Workers have also been harmed by conditions such as poisoning, improper ventilation, explosion, overwork, low wages, and physical abuse.

After allegations of sweatshop conditions, Apple launched an investigation and worked with their manufacturers to ensure that conditions were acceptable by its standards. In 2007, Apple started yearly audits of the labor conditions of all its suppliers, slowly raising standards and severing relationships with suppliers that did not comply—yearly progress reports have also been published since 2008.

In 2010, Apple and other clients reportedly investigated a series of suicides at Foxconn. Foxconn implemented various measures in response to the suicides.

A 2014 BBC investigation found excessive hours and other problems persisted, despite Apple's promise to reform factory practice after the 2010 Foxconn suicides. Apple publicly disagreed with the BBC and stated: "We are aware of no other company doing as much as Apple to ensure fair and safe working conditions". In the period following these exposures, Apple has continued to receive criticism for its labor rights record.

=== Mines ===
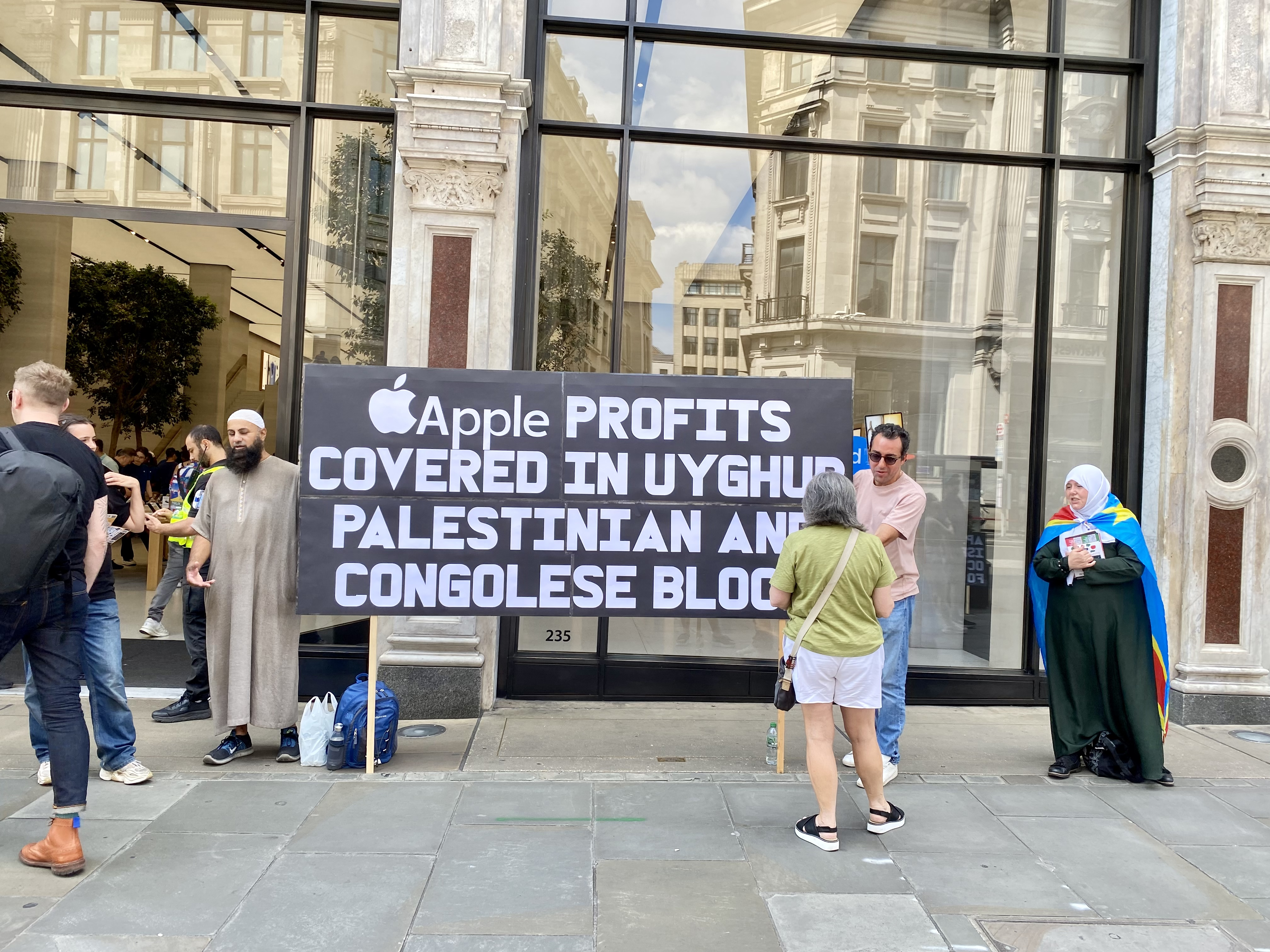
Protest at the Apple Store on Regent Street in London, August 2025

In 2019, Apple was named as a defendant in a forced labour and child slavery lawsuit by Congolese families of children injured and killed in cobalt mines owned by Glencore and Zhejiang Huayou Cobalt, which supply battery materials to Apple and other companies.

In April 2024, lawyers representing the Democratic Republic of the Congo notified Apple of evidence that Apple might be sourcing minerals from conflict areas of eastern Congo. Apple policies and documentation describe mitigation efforts against conflict minerals; however, the lawyers identify discrepancies in supplier reporting as well as a Global Witness report describing a lack of "meaningful mitigation" on Apple's part. In December 2024, DRC filed a lawsuit against Apple's European subsidiaries, accusing them of using conflict minerals. In response, Apple said it "strongly disputes" these allegations and insisted it is "deeply committed to responsible sourcing" of the minerals it uses.

== See also ==
- Criticism of Apple Inc.
