= Trader Joe's unions =

Collective worker action at the American grocery store chain

Starting in 2022, workers from several Trader Joe's grocery stores have voted on whether to unionize. A store in Hadley, Massachusetts, became the first to unionize and created Trader Joe's United, an independent union unaffiliated with national unions. Stores in Minneapolis, Louisville, and Oakland joined them. Other workers have organized with the United Food and Commercial Workers. Trader Joe's, a chain with over 500 locations and over 50,000 employees, is known for its neighborhood store vibe and over-the-top customer service, which has sometimes clashed with its working conditions. Corporate management has a history of resisting staff unionization efforts. Driven by COVID-19 pandemic working conditions, American service sector organization increased, and Trader Joe's worker concerns over safety, pay, and benefits contributed to their union drive.

== Background ==
Trader Joe's is a grocery store chain in the United States known for its "quirky neighborhood vibe" and over-the-top customer service, such as personally leading inquiring customers to products they could not find on the shelf, opening product packaging for tastings, and accepting returns for any reason. Historically, the company's strategy has included higher rates of pay and benefits than the industry, offset by increased sales and lower turnover costs. In return, some employees, who are known internally as "crew members", feel tension between upholding the appearance of happiness and friendliness while coping with unfavorable or toxic working conditions, such as managerial malfeasance, surveillance, and unaddressed safety issues, especially as exacerbated during the COVID-19 pandemic. While the company contends that its pay, benefits, and working conditions are already among the best in the grocery industry, some employee benefits diminished in the 2010s, such as retirement fund contributions and health insurance for part-time workers.

As of 2022, Trader Joe's employed over 50,000 workers across over 530 Trader Joe's grocery stores in the United States. As of 2023, four of those stores have unionized. Trader Joe's is owned by the German grocer Aldi Nord. The company's management has retained Littler Mendelson, a firm known for union avoidance, as their legal representation.

== Pre-union organization ==
Trader Joe's management has generally resisted staff unionization efforts, seen more visibly during the COVID-19 pandemic. Prior to the pandemic, Trader Joe's had a history of tracking worker rumors about unionization. In 2016, an employee's firing for insufficiently friendly greetings uncovered wider morale issues in some stores and led workers to ask the Retail, Wholesale and Department Store Union (RWDSU) for assistance in organizing. In spring 2019, workers protested restrictions on pronoun pins, which resulted in allowance for pins up to an inch in diameter, but reignited talks of unionization.

With the rise of the Covid public health crisis in March 2020 in the United States, activism increased among workers providing essential services, such those in grocery stores, for better protections and working conditions. Worker protections early in the pandemic included reducing hours, closing stores after workers test positive for Covid, offering bonuses, and adding a week of paid sick leave. Some workers held that the latter two were inadequate and that the safety precautions were applied inconsistently. While the company had allowed masks and gloves at different points, protocol varied between individual stores, and some store managers banned masks and gloves based on perception for customers. Some stores were slow to close after workers were initially infected. Unions were immediately affiliated with union organizing, as even before the end of March 2020, Trader Joe's organizers had petitioned for additional hazard pay, connected the RWDSU with workers, and management had responded, with anti-union talking points from store and regional managers during regular team meetings. A worker coalition called for a boycott based on inadequate COVID procedure. On March 31, CEO Dan Bane circulated a company memo opposing the union, the latest in a series of company memos and actions against union organizing.

The drive to unionize Trader Joe's came amidst a wave of service worker organization in the United States, a sector that has traditionally been difficult to organize due to high turnover. By the time the first Trader Joe's unions went to vote, a Starbucks campaign had organized more than 200 company-owned locations in half a year, and campaigns at Apple and Amazon had seen successful drives. The National Labor Relations Board saw a 58% increase in union petitions in the first nine months of its 2022 fiscal year compared to the same period of the prior fiscal year.

== Trader Joe's United ==
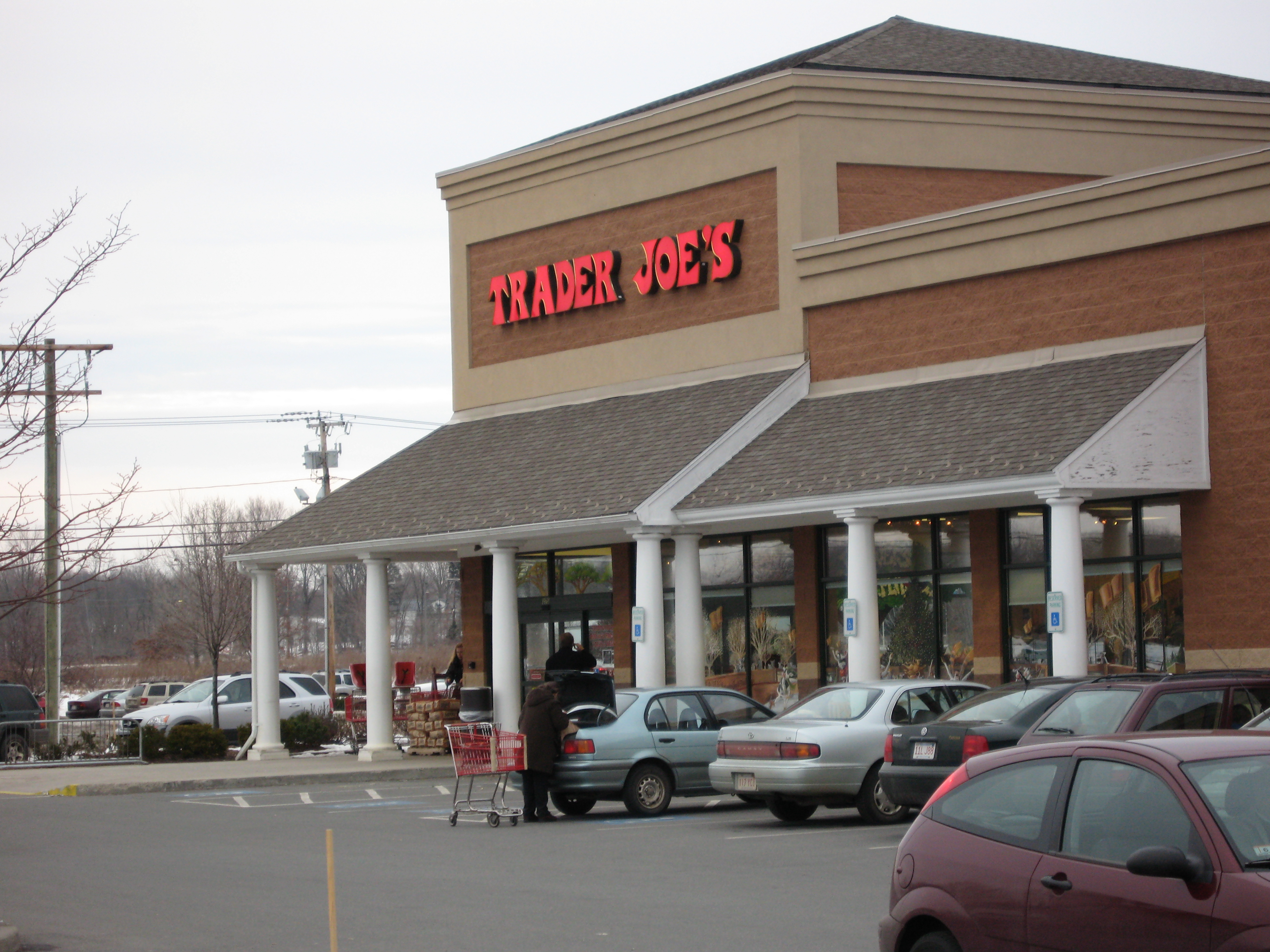
The Hadley Trader Joe's, the first company location to unionize, pictured in 2007

Trader Joe's United is a self-managed union, run entirely by the workers themselves and unaffiliated with a national labor union. Workers from a store location in Hadley, Massachusetts, were the company's first to organize and chose to initiate a union particular to Trader Joe's. It also represents workers stores in Minneapolis, Louisville and Oakland.

Workers in Hadley, Massachusetts, near Springfield, first began discussion of unionizing in late 2021 upon recognition that they were unaware of a state mandate that provided for paid time off for Covid-related reasons. Organizing began in January 2022 and went public with an open letter response to the CEO in mid-May. Union supporters were motivated by reductions in healthcare and retirement benefits as well as desire to address health and safety issues. The company had previously contributed 15% of annual earnings into individual retirement accounts but reduced the contribution to 10% before putting it fully at the company's discretion, and many employees did not notice the changes until January 2022. Organizers felt that pay had become less competitive over time. All of the Hadley organizers had 10 to 20 years' tenure at Trader Joe's. During the pandemic, while Trader Joe's initially enforced masks, occupancy limits, and temporary pay increases, organizing workers held that the company retracted those measures too soon. Hadley workers contracted Covid in spring 2022 as mask enforcement was removed and the social practice of masking dissipated. Hadley workers were additionally inspired by unionization at Starbucks and Amazon. Worker organizing was supported by the Emergency Workplace Organizing Committee.

By early June, Hadley workers filed for a National Labor Relations Board (NLRB) vote as Trader Joe's United. Though their union is independent, the workers received administrative and legal assistance from other unions. Over 30% of the 88 non-management employees signed cards seeking union representation. While the company expressed its interest in a fair vote, in the lead-up to the election, two senior corporate officials were sent to the store to meet with employees in small groups or one-on-one, and suggested that benefits could become less generous and that their relationship with management could worsen upon an affirmative vote. A spokesperson said that this speaking with leadership was a common practice. In one such session, a union organizer said a manager and an official told her group to vote "no". Prior to filing for a vote, the union additionally filed an unfair labor practice charge over an alleged retaliation incident by which a worker was sent home for wearing a union pin, a protected concerted activity.

Hadley's final tally, counted in July 2022, was 45 to 31, in favor of unionization. Management expressed willingness to immediately begin collective bargaining and to use an existing union contract from another multi-state grocery company as a template.

Workers from a second store, in Minneapolis, voted to unionize with Trader Joe's United the following month, joining Hadley in self-organizing without national union representation. Minneapolis workers announced their campaign in late June 2022 with a campaign for compensation, benefits, safety, and representation in day-to-day operations. They chose the independent union formed by Hadley for its familiarity with their unique work culture. Minneapolis voted to unionize, 55 to 5, in August.

A third store, in Williamsburg, Brooklyn, voted against unionizing with Trader Joe's United. The group petitioned to unionize in late September 2022, seeking better wages, benefits, sick leave, and a fairer disciplinary process. The company announced the union drive in the store's break room prior to the union's own announcement. The organizers said this undermined trust in the union. The company also fired a prominent organizer after the break room announcement, for which the organizers filed a complaint with the NLRB on October 14, prior to their late October vote. Brooklyn voted 94 to 66 against unionization. The NLRB dismissed the complaint against Trader Joe's three months later.

A store in Louisville, Kentucky, voted to unionize (48 to 36) with Trader Joe's United in January 2023, following a petition to unionize the month prior. The company objected to the vote with a NLRB filing that the union illegally pressured unsupportive workers.

The Hadley and Minneapolis stores are bargaining separately but in parallel. The union's initial economic proposals were a $30 hourly starting wage, health insurance without premiums or high deductibles, increased paid time off for illness and bereavement leave, and guaranteed employer contributions to a retirement plan. During contract bargaining, Trader Joe's United filed unfair labor practice charges against the company for not bargaining in good faith.

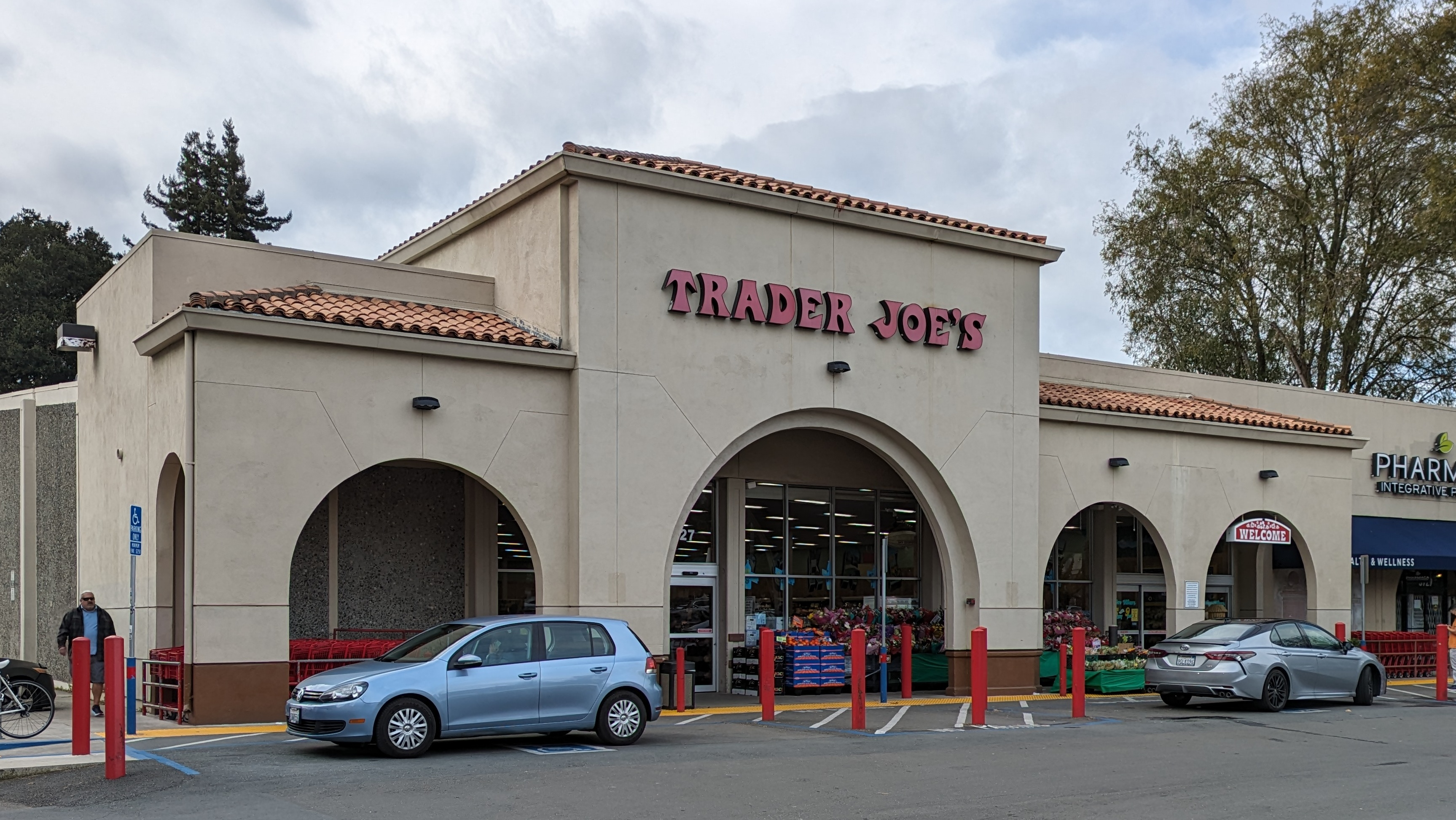
The Trader Joe's store on College Avenue in Oakland, where employees voted to unionize in 2023

A store in Oakland, California voted to unionize (73 to 53) with Trader Joe's United on April 20.

On April 21, workers at the Lower East Side, NY store lost their union vote in a 76 to 76 tie. This was the third unionization attempt in New York within a year. Previously, the store in Brooklyn voted against unionizing and the Wine Shop in Manhattan shut down before workers could vote.

== United Food and Commercial Workers ==
Trader Joe's workers in Boulder, Colorado, followed Hadley and Minneapolis in filing for a union election in late July 2022. Unlike the prior two, the group was attempting to unionize with a national union, the United Food and Commercial Workers. Top concerns from the organization drive included reduction in retirement plan contribution matching and tenure-based pay disparities. Boulder workers withdrew their election petition in August 2022, and filed unfair labor practice charges.

Workers in Trader Joe's New York City Wine Shop, who were also working with the United Food and Commercial Workers, had amassed internal support and were planning to file for an election when the store was abruptly closed in August 2022. The company said the store's closure followed a long-term review on how best to use their sole license to sell wine in the state.
