= SACOM =

- Japanese corporation System Sacom
- Students & Scholars Against Corporate Misbehaviour
