= Emergency Workplace Organizing Committee =

American union organizer training organization

- Abbreviation: EWOC
- Formation: March 2020
- Founder: DSA and UE
- Type: Union organizer training organization
- Location: United States
- Website: workerorganizing.org

The Emergency Workplace Organizing Committee (EWOC) is an American union organizer training organization founded in 2020. EWOC is a joint project of the Democratic Socialists of America (DSA) and the United Electrical, Radio and Machine Workers of America (UE). EWOC provides labor organizing support and training to non-union workers in the United States.

== Model ==
EWOC attempts to help "everyday people" organize on the job. EWOC provides direct, remote support to non-union workers who contact the organization. Workers are connected with volunteer organizers, who help them assess workplace issues, map relationships among co-workers, build an organizing committee, and plan collective action. EWOC runs online trainings and publishes organizing materials. EWOC is not a union. EWOC volunteers help workers organize shop-floor campaigns and affiliate with an established union.

EWOC's model is highly distributed and relies heavily on volunteers, including labor organizers and DSA members, to assist workers remotely. EWOC was inspired by the volunteer-based organizing methods used in the Bernie Sanders 2020 presidential campaign.

== History ==
=== Origins ===
EWOC began in March 2020, during the COVID-19 pandemic. EWOC initially focused on helping workers organize around COVID-19 workplace protections, including paid sick leave, vaccine access, hazard pay, and masking.

Since 2021, EWOC has focused on organizing the unorganized workers of America. EWOC focuses on industries that have been under-served by the labor movement, such as food service workers.

=== Unionization campaigns ===
In February 2021, EWOC volunteers helped organize retail workers at Bookshop Santa Cruz in Santa Cruz, California. Workers voted to join Communication Workers of America (CWA) as Local 9423.

In September 2022, EWOC volunteers helped organize healthcare workers at Ascension Seton Medical Center in Austin, Texas. Workers voted to join National Nurses Organizing Committee/National Nurses United (NNOC/NNU). In March 2024, workers won a first contract.

In October 2022, EWOC volunteers helped organize food service workers at Chipotle in Lawrence, Kansas. However, Lawrence Chipotle workers were unable to form a union due to extensive unfair labor practices from Chipotle, as determined by the National Labor Relations Board (NLRB). Chipotle settled with the NLRB, posting material about the right to organize in staff areas, but nobody was reinstated or given back pay. Workers in the Lawrence Chipotle were inspired by the August 2022 vote by Chipotle workers in Lansing, Michigan, who were supported by Metro Detroit DSA. Workers voted 11-3 to unionize with International Brotherhood of Teamsters Local 243, the chain's first unionized location. The Lansing Chipotle was the only Chipotle location to successfully unionize. Contract negotiations in Lansing stalled until 2026, when the union failed to win a contract. Chipotle has never recognized any union at any location. Chipotle was forced to pay $240,000 for busting a union attempt in Augusta, Maine.

In March 2023, EWOC volunteers helped organize retail workers at REI in SoHo. Workers voted to create the REI Union with the Retail, Wholesale and Department Store Union (RWDSU) of the AFL-CIO. On March 2, 2022, workers at REI's SoHo store voted 88–14 in support of the union. As of 2025, eleven REI stores have voted to unionize, but have yet to finish negotiating a contract.

In April 2023, EWOC volunteers helped organize workers at Drunk Shakespeare in Chicago. Workers voted to unionize as Drunk Shakespeare United (DSU) with the Actors' Equity Association (AEA). DSU spread from Chicago to other Drunk Shakespeare locations, including Phoenix and Washington, D.C. In November 2024, DSU Chicago won their first contract, crediting EWOC training and mentorship, which included pay raises, health insurance, and limits to on-stage drinking.

In July 2023, EWOC volunteers helped organize food service workers at Barboncino, a Crown Heights pizzeria. A majority of workers at Barboncino voted to unionize with Workers United NY/NJ of the Service Employees International Union (SEIU), representing 40 workers and becoming the first unionized pizzeria in New York City.

In November 2023, EWOC volunteers helped organize service workers at board game cafe Hex&Co. in New York City. EWOC helped workers in New York board game cafes The Uncommons and The Brooklyn Strategist follow suit. Their union, Tabletop Workers United within Workers United NY/NJ of SEIU, became the first board game worker union in New York City. Out of 94 voters, 77 voted to unionize. Tabletop Workers United now represents over 100 workers at all three cafes. In 2024, TWU ratified its first contract at Brooklyn Strategist. In 2025, TWU won contracts at all cafes.

In November 2023, EWOC volunteers helped organize retail workers at Trader Joe's in Hadley, Minneapolis, Louisville, and Oakland. Workers voted to form the independent union Trader Joe's United.

In May 2024, EWOC volunteers helped organize food service workers at Blue Bottle Coffee (owned by Nestlé) in Boston, Massachusetts. Workers voted 38–4 form the Blue Bottle Independent Union (BBIU). In August 2025, EWOC volunteers helped organize Blue Bottle workers in downtown Berkeley, Piedmont Avenue, Old Oakland, and downtown Oakland. California workers voted 22-5 to join BBIU. In November 2025, after 92% of workers voted in favor, 80 Boston and 35 California workers went on strike for 4 days during the Thanksgiving weekend. BBIU accused the company of negotiating the union contract in bad faith.

In August 2025, EWOC volunteers helped organize beauty care workers at Sugared + Bronzed in Los Angeles and Santa Monica. Workers voted to unionize with Communications Workers of America (CWA) Local 9505, the first salon union in the country.

== Impact ==
In early 2022, Jacobin reported that more than 3,000 workers had contacted EWOC and that nearly 400 organizing campaigns had begun with EWOC support. In June 2023, EWOC reported 186 active labor organizing campaigns. In 2024, Jacobin reported that more than 5,000 workers had reached out to EWOC since 2020.

== See also ==
- Democratic Socialists of America
- United Electrical, Radio and Machine Workers of America
- Labor Notes
