= REI worker organization =

Unionization efforts at the U.S. outdoor recreation retail company

Workers at Recreational Equipment, Inc. (REI), an American retail and outdoor recreation services co-op, have one recognized trade union. The company has faced accusations of being anti-union. In 2016, REI workers went public with organization efforts that had been growing over concerns about wages and working conditions in the Pacific Northwest, and the company has since faced increasing public criticism from its employees nationwide over issues including living wages, hourly worker policies, and safety protocols during the COVID-19 pandemic. Workers have organized at least five petitions since 2016. REI has maintained that it is committed to adjusting and improving working conditions for its employees.

In 2022, a REI store in SoHo, Manhattan, New York City, became the first in the retailer's history to file a petition for a union vote with the National Labor Relations Board. The store's employees voted in support of the union.

As of 2026, eleven stores have voted to unionize, Soho, New York; Berkeley, California; Cleveland, Ohio; Chicago, Illinois; Boston, Massachuetts; Durham, North Carolina; Maple Grove, Minnesota; Bellingham, Washington; Castleton, Indiana; Santa Cruz, California; and Greensboro, North Carolina. Negotiations began in 2022, with REI originally represented by Perkins Coie. Currently, the company is represented by Morgan, Lewis, and Bockius LLP. In July 2024, the workers and the employer entered into a side letter agreement that established a bargaining structured that would inform store level CBAs. Negotiations are ongoing.

== REI Employees for Real Change ==
REI Employees for Real Change logo

=== 2016 ===
In 2016 a group of REI employees, and former employee Alpine Anderson, in Seattle, Washington, where REI is headquartered, calling themselves "REI Employees for Real Change" created a Facebook page, an Instagram account, and started a petition with Coworker.org, a nonprofit labor group that assists workers in organizing. The workers claimed that following a rise in the city's minimum wage, the raises they got were not commensurate with the hike, and many had their hours cut and scheduling was "erratic". In May 2016, at the consumer co-op’s annual members’ meeting, a worker asked then-chief executive officer (CEO) Jerry Stritzke why retail workers hadn't gotten a raise for the prior year in spite of record revenues, saying, "Can we get the signal that we matter too?" Strizke said that the co-op could not afford to pay all its workers the $15 minimum wage they were asking for, but that he considered them REI's "most important asset".

A few months later, in July, the workers organized a union forum at Seattle's city hall with the assistance of the United Food and Commercial Workers and Kshama Sawant, a Seattle City Councilmember and member of Democratic Socialists of America, to advocate for better working conditions and pay, which the group said hadn't kept up with the success of the business. The co-op maintained it complied with local laws and paid competitive hourly wages to accommodate the flexibility preferred by other staffers. At the forum, Anderson alleged she had been unlawfully terminated on December 12, 2015, from a Portland, Oregon, store after she led 55 of her colleagues in organizing around increases in hourly wages and better scheduling. REI said they could not comment on personnel issues, but that Anderson's claims were "not accurate". One employee, asked at the forum, "Why does the company that we all love so much, that makes billions of dollars in revenues, not give us enough hours so that we can afford food and rent with our wages, let alone health care and other benefits?" Following the forum, the co-op sent employees a memorandum that read: "REI management is not anti-union ... We just don’t need [a union] at REI. We sincerely urge you not to sign a union authorization card." Workers involved in the organizing interpreted the memos to be discouraging them from unionizing. Workers who spoke at the forum were adamant that they were proud to work for REI, and wanted to continue working for the retailer. REI stated that the co-op believed the full picture was not being properly represented by Councilmember Sawant, reiterating its pay and benefits packages were highly competitive with the market, and that the co-op diverted 72 percent of its profits to employees, cooperative members, and philanthropy.

The workers also sent a letter to management, asking for cost-of-living increases, in addition to the forthcoming minimum-wage increases in the city, access to full time hours, and if enough signatures were collected to file a union petition with the National Labor Relations Board (NLRB), unopposed acknowledgement of the union. The co-op raised wages in seven cities the following month, including in Seattle, and promised it would implement new scheduling mechanisms to improve the consistency of hours the following October. REI also said they "welcome open, constructive dialogue" with employees, and encouraged workers to meet about any issues they were facing individually with their store managers, in one-on-one meetings.

=== 2018 ===
In November 2018, after neighboring Whole Foods Market, and its parent company Amazon, raised the company-wide minimum wage to $15 per hour, Anderson led the group, then made up of around 200 workers, to call for consumers to boycott the co-op for the same bump in wages, and for better working conditions, partnering again with Coworker.org. REI responded saying that Anderson was "not an REI employee", and that no employees were behind the petition. The petition stated "Collectively, we have faced: homelessness, medical debt, having to rely on food stamps to feed ourselves, even selling our plasma so we can pay the rent, and living off of credit cards." Anderson said that the main complaint of the Seattle workers was issues with scheduling, and not getting enough hours.

REI has said that they "have made a substantial investment in retail pay, and we’re proud to say we target retail hourly pay above the majority of retailers", and that they "want to do more for [REI workers] where [they] can".

=== 2020 ===
In spring 2020, during the COVID-19 pandemic, the group, led by former worker Caleb Lawson, started another petition with Coworker.org accusing REI of prioritizing sales over the safety of its workers. The petition demanded hazard pay and improved safety protocols. Workers in Grand Rapids, Michigan, Texas, and Tucson, Arizona, alleged that they had not been informed about exposure to COVID-19 and that management had instructed them not to share their positive test results with their teammates or on social media. The Grand Rapids store had been closed for one day, July 3, 2020, to investigate "potential" exposure, but reopened the following day, after leadership had determined no one had been exposed. On July 6, 2020, a worker alerted their colleagues in a group chat, allegedly against the wishes of leadership, that they tested positive for the virus on July 2, 2020, and that management had told them not to tell anyone. Devin Hilla, a worker who quit because of the incident, alleged that the human resources department told him his contact with the sick worker did not count as exposure. Lawson alleged that he was pressured to resign after raising concerns and starting the petition. REI said that their notification policies were meant to avoid revealing confidential health information of workers, and to protect COVID-positive employees from exclusion or other poor treatment from coworkers. REI later changed their policy to notify everyone at a store of positive test cases and the last date that employee worked, CEO Eric Artz saying, "Some employees wanted transparency above what C.D.C. guidelines and our policies directed". REI closed all of its stores in March 2020, and they were all re-opened in seven waves, utilizing contactless shopping and limiting in-store transactions, by July 6, 2020.

Workers also criticized the co-op for furloughing its retail staff, unpaid, during April until July 2020, and then laying off 400 of the workers while opening six new stores. REI said it had closed the stores to prioritize the safety of workers and customers, and paid the employees as long as they could before the furlough, and maintained all employee benefits during the closures. Artz gave up his entire salary during the unpaid leave, along with board members and REI executives taking a 20-percent reduction in pay and forfeiture of bonuses for 2021. The company also laid off 300 corporate employees due to the pandemic. REI said that the decisions made during 2020 were necessary to maintain a healthy infrastructure, later selling their recently opened Bellevue, Washington, corporate headquarters in favor of a "remote-first" approach to recoup losses from the pandemic.

In fall 2020, the group called out REI's marketing around the 2015 #OptOutside campaign a "marketing move" that only benefited corporate workers. Workers in Pittsburgh, Saratoga, and Portland alleged that the company's marketing of its image covered up "what REI is" and the working conditions, alleging that working at REI in retail "you cannot make a living". The campaign was centered around workers receiving one full day of paid time off on Black Friday to "do what they love most – be outside", and the ethical responsibility of discouraging shopping. REI said in a press release that they were paying all of its 12,000 employees for the day off. Workers said that members and staff were excited about the annual initiative, but also reported that a minimum to receive paid days off at the co-op is 24 hours, a threshold they said many had struggled to meet, saying that closing on Black Friday resulted in a reduction of hours that disqualified them from receiving holiday pay on both Thanksgiving and Black Friday. Workers alleged the practice was systemic, but REI said that their scheduling was based around customer experience, and employee availability and performance. The campaign was widely praised by the public and by corporate REI employees, and workers organizing and speaking to the press said that they believed REI was one of the best retailers for which to work. REI also said that it offered bonuses to all employees, and employees who worked more than 20 hours a week were eligible for "some of the best benefits available to retail employees".

The co-op said that it put more than 70 percent of profits into employee profit sharing programs and its member dividend program, and that it placed "purpose before profits".

=== 2021 ===
In May 2021, REI dropped its in-store mask requirements, and employees staged a "sick out" and asked consumers to boycott the store on May 22, 2021. Workers at stores in Bellingham, Des Moines, Columbus, Salt Lake City, and Portland expressed to The New York Times their shock at the co-op's sudden change to its policies, saying they felt endangered. Several workers in Portland walked off the job when the announcement was made. REI later reversed the policy.

=== 2023 ===
In March 2023, REI workers in Orange, OH voted to unionize by a vote of 27–12. In April, its Eugene, OR location filed a petition for union elections with the National Labor Relations Board. On May 25 the company's Durham, NC store's workers voted 20-12 to unionize with the United Food and Commercial Workers International Union, after a four-day strike precipitated by the co-op's alleged retaliation against a union organizer. Durham's thus became the sixth REI store to unionize.

In November 2023, workers at eight REI retail stores accused the company of dozens of violations of federal labor law, including retaliating against pro-union workers, altering working conditions without union consultation, and refusing to bargain in good faith with unions at stores that had voted in favor of unionization.

=== 2026 ===
In March 2026, HuffPost reported that unionized REI workers were planning to hold a vote to decide whether they would formally request that REI customers refrain from shopping at REI stores during the company's annual anniversary sale, held in May of each year.

== SoHo ==
Logo of the REI Union SoHo organizing committee

On January 21, 2022, 115 workers at REI's SoHo store in Manhattan, New York City, led by Claire Chang, filed the retailer's first NLRB petition for a union vote with the Retail, Wholesale and Department Store Union. The SoHo organizing campaign was supported by the Emergency Workplace Organizing Committee. Kate Denend, one of the store's organizers, alleged that the company keeps workers classified as part-time for a year, depriving them of benefits, despite working 32 or more hours per week, and often keeps workers under-scheduled following the holiday season. She alleged it was a "facade of being a progressive, liberal company", and that none of the workers are "making a living wage". Graham Gale, another union organizer, alleged that workers had faced "unsafe working conditions during a global pandemic" and that many of the workers laid off during the pandemic had been at the company for many years and were among the most outspoken about workplace issues. Workers involved in organizing and joining the union were reported to be determined to stay with the company, strongly believing in the work that they do, and wanting to make a good workplace better.

The unionizing workers asked for voluntary recognition by the company, but REI declined. The company was accused of union busting, with Artz telling workers that a union was not "needed or beneficial", and managers giving anti-union speeches in required morning meetings, putting up anti-union flyers, and freezing promotions. As of February 2022, REI's website stated that "unions exist to collect dues, assess fines, and tell you to go on strike". Mother Jones criticized the company for misleading rhetoric around its cooperative status, as it is a consumers' cooperative, not a worker cooperative. The company told the magazine that the workers are "REI employees, first and foremost", and "a part of the co-op", but "the presence of union representation will impact [REI's] ability to communicate directly with those employees and resolve concerns as they arise". The organizers tweeted about the company's response, pointing to one of the company's slogans, "We go further together", writing: "To us, that means employees need a seat at the table to collaboratively develop our agreements with you." REI has continued to reiterate that it is not anti-union, and respects the choice of its workers choice to join a union.

The company said it is "committed to resolving the concerns of its employees", stating that they "respect the rights of [REI] employees", and that they "believe that unions play an important role in the rights of workers, and in workplaces or companies where employees do not have a voice". The company also released a podcast episode in February 2022 featuring Artz and Wilma Wallace, the company's chief diversity and social impact officer, in which Artz stated: "Every employee has the right to expect me to listen, to hear, to understand concerns and ideas and suggestions." Some alleged the podcast weaponized "social justice language" against its workers and the public in an attempt to make unionizing sound at-odds with ideals like social equity. Artz and Wallace, neither of whom are of Indigenous descent, were both criticized for opening the podcast mentioning the Native lands on which they were at the time of recording. Land acknowledgement in the United States is meant to recognize and address the past involving native peoples, and some scholars of Indigenous studies argue that these types of executions of land acknowledgment by non-natives can be interpreted as a "hollow and performative" virtue signalling. REI has a history of being a social impact brand, and when Wallace, who is Black, was promoted as the appointee to the new C-suite position, she launched a program to invest in businesses owned by Black, Indigenous, and other people of color, which she said was a part of her commitment to using her own lived experience to advancing social justice initiatives. Just prior to her appointment, REI had also sponsored a Native Governance Center event called "Beyond Land Acknowledgment", which was meant to help attendees "learn how to take meaningful action to support Indigenous people and nations".

On March 2, 2022, workers at REI's SoHo store voted 88–14 in support of the union.

== Berkeley ==
In August 2022, the REI store in Berkeley, California, voted to join the United Food and Commercial Workers union.

== See also ==
- Amazon worker organization
- Apple worker organizations
- Starbucks unions
