= James Supercave =

- Origin: Los Angeles, California, U.S.
- Genres: Psychedelic rock
- Years active: 2010––present
- Label: Fairfax Recordings
- Members: Joaquin Pastor; Patrick Logothetti; Andreas Villalobos
- Website: jamessupercave.com

James Supercave is an American rock band formed in Los Angeles, California, in 2010. The members are Joaquin Pastor, Patrick Logothetti, and Andreas Villalobos. The band received popular attention upon releasing M.O.W.O. On February 12, 2016, the band first released their debut album, Better Strange, through Fairfax Recordings, however, they released an extended play prior in 2014, titled The Afternoon.

M.O.W.O was a four-song release on February 21, 2020. The title is an abbreviation of "Money is the Only Way Out." Featured on M.O.W.O was Poor George as a single, their most-listened to song on Spotify. Poor George has been described as "a mock pity party for the male species" by Pastor. James Supercave collaborated with Ian Scott and Mark Jackson for Poor George.

Before releasing M.O.W.O, they released Alarm Will Sound, an EP with six songs, including Fools on January 25, 2019.
