= Fairfax Recordings =

- Founded: 2011
- Founder: Kevin Augunas
- Defunct: 2016
- Status: Inactive
- Genre: Rock
- Location: Van Nuys, California
- Official website: fairfaxrecordings.com

Fairfax Recordings was a record label and recording studio based in Van Nuys, California, and founded by producer Kevin Augunas. It was located at Sound City Studios from 2011 to 2017.

The company was best known for its collection of vintage studio recording equipment and instruments. The studio utilized analog recording equipment and techniques and experimented with recording directly to vinyl, bypassing the mix-down process entirely.
