= Environmental impact of Apple Inc. =

Apple Inc. has received both praise and criticism for its environmental practices – the former for its usage reduction of hazardous chemicals in its products and transition to clean energy supplies, and the latter for its wasteful use of raw materials in manufacturing, its vigorous opposition to right to repair laws, and the amount of e-waste created by its products.

Apple, in partnership with The Conservation Fund, have preserved 36,000 acres of working forests in Maine and North Carolina. In 2015, a partnership was planned with the World Wildlife Fund to preserve up to 1,000,000 acres (4,000 km^{2}) of forests in China. Featured was the company's installation of a 40 MW solar power plant in the Sichuan province of China that was designed to coexist with surrounding grasslands supporting the yak population. Its solar projects in China compensated for more than all of the energy necessary for Apple's stores and offices, negating the company's energy carbon footprint in the country. In Singapore, Apple has worked with the Singaporean solar energy system developer Sunseap to cover the rooftops of 800 buildings in the city-state with solar panels, allowing Apple's Singapore operations to be powered by 100% renewable energy. In 2016, Apple introduced Liam, an advanced robotic disassembler and sorter designed by Apple engineers in California specifically for recycling outdated or broken iPhones. It reuses and recycles parts from traded-in products.

== Timeline ==
=== Carbon Footprint ===
In 2001, Apple computers and displays first met Energy Star requirements, in which they voluntarily phased out tetrabromobisphenol A (TBBPA) in all their plastic enclosure parts greater than 25 grams. They also began to purchase 100 percent of electricity for the Austin facility from renewable sources, called Austin's "Green Choice" Power Program. In 2002, Apple continued to build a more environmentally friendly effort. For example, Apple signed the European Union Code of Conduct on Power Supplies, which encourages manufacturers to design power supplies that minimize energy consumption in "off" mode.

In 2009, Apple revealed a complete life cycle analysis of greenhouse gas emissions, which set a new standard for full environmental disclosure. Apple is the only company in the industry that publishes the environmental footprint of each of its products. Other companies only report on a fraction of their emissions. All of their products became BFR-free with shipping and mercury-free LED-backlit displays with arsenic-free display glass. The Mac mini, iMac, and Mac Pro met the Energy Star 5.0 specification.

In 2012, Apple launched the redesigned iMac, using 68% less material and generating 67% fewer carbon emissions than earlier generations. Also, the aluminum stand on the iMac is made using 30% recycled content. Meanwhile, at their headquarters in Cupertino, energy use was cut by over 30%, and Apple provided a biogas-powered fuel cell and built rooftop solar photovoltaic systems. They introduced their redesigned AirPort Express with an enclosure containing bio-based polymers derived from industrial-grade rapeseed and post-consumer recycled PC-ABS plastic.

In December 2016, Apple agreed to pay the California Environmental Protection Agency a $450,000 settlement in what they said was "an oversight in paperwork" for operating and closing 803,000 pounds of electronic waste at two hazardous-waste processing plants in Cupertino and Sunnyvale without filing the proper paperwork.

In April 2021, Apple claimed to have started a $200 million fund in order to combat climate change by removing 1 million metric tons of carbon dioxide from the atmosphere each year.

In 2023, Apple announced it was dropping leather from its product lines, citing the material's "significant carbon footprint". The move earned Apple a 2023 Company of the Year award from PETA.

=== E-Waste and Recycling ===
In 1990, Apple officially released and implemented its environmental policy, while in 1991, a phase-out of lead ibatteries began.

In 1994, there was also a phase-out of nickel-cadmium batteries, while in 1995, PVC in packaging materials was phased out as well. The first Apple manufacturing site in Sacramento, California became ISO 14001 certified. ISO 14001:2004 set the criteria for an environmental management system, mapping out a framework that a company or an organization can use. If one chooses to use ISO 14001:2004, it can provide assurance to company management and employees as well as external stakeholders that environmental impact is being measured and improved. The benefits of using ISO 14001:2004 are reduced cost of waste management, saving in consumption of energy and materials, lower distribution costs, and improved corporate image among regulators, customers, and the public.

In 2004, there was a phaseout of substances included in the European Restriction of Hazardous Substances (RoHS) Directive was initiated. Importantly noted, The Apple Supplier Code of Conduct was implemented in 2005, and in 2006, Apple was the first computer manufacturer to replace CRT displays with material-efficient and energy-efficient LCDs.

In 2008, Apple introduced the unibody MacBook and MacBook Pro, which are made with recyclable aluminum and glass enclosures with arsenic and mercury-free displays. It is also made with PVC-free internal components. The MacBook Air was the first Mac to use Mercury free backlight technology with arsenic-free LCD display glass. Along with that, the iPhone 3G shipped with PVC-free handset, headphones, and USB cables; BFR-free printed circuit boards; and a mercury and arsenic-free display. Apple achieved a recycling rate of 41.9%.

In 2011, Apple introduced iTunes cards that use 100% recyclable paper, and they also introduced the Mac App Store in 123 countries. Delivering digital downloads reduces the environmental impact of delivering software by eliminating the packaging and transportation. Apple also eliminates restored DVDs that were previously included in Mac product packaging.

In June 2012, Apple withdrew its product line from the global registry for greener electronics program, Electronic Product Environmental Assessment Tool (EPEAT), reporting the line no longer qualified for EPEAT's ratings for green certification; the San Francisco Department of Environment then notified its agencies that Apple computers no longer qualified for city purchase funds. The line of products has since been added back.

In April 2017, Vice obtained documents via FOIA requests, showing that Apple's recycling program forbade the salvage and reuse of parts. A report written by John Yeider, Apple's recycling program manager at the time, said "All hard drives are shredded in confetti-sized pieces. The pieces are then sorted into commodities grade materials. After sorting, the materials are sold and used for production stock in new products. No reuse. No parts harvesting. No resale."

In October 2018, the Italian government fined Apple €10 million for planned obsolescence after they admitted to installing software updates on iPhones that deliberately lowered their performance to force users to replace their devices sooner than necessary, creating extraneous e-waste.

=== Energy Consumption ===
In 1992, Apple officially became a founding member of the U.S. EPA Energy Star program, which was developed to identify and promote energy-efficient computers and monitors. During this time, there was also a phase-out of chlorofluorocarbons (CFCs) in Apple manufacturing, which are substances that deplete the ozone layer.

In 2010, all displays that were offered by Apple became mercury-free and used arsenic-free display glass. Apple introduced the Apple Battery charger for rechargeable batteries, which reduces battery waste by 78% and the carbon footprint by 63% over a four-year period. Also, Apple introduced the Mac mini, which was the world's most energy-efficient desktop computer, because it can operate on 10 watts of electricity (which is less power than a single energy-efficient CFL lightbulb). By this time, Apple also began to build facilities in Cork, Ireland; Austin, Texas; and Sacramento, California, and converted to using 100% renewable energy.

In 2011, Greenpeace called on Apple to power its data centers with renewable energy. In early 2013, Apple announced it was now using 100% renewable energy to power their data centers, and that 75% of the company's overall power use came from renewable sources. That same year, the Chinese environmental group Institute of Public and Environmental Affairs (IPE) accused Apple's Chinese suppliers of discharging polluted waste and toxic metals into surrounding communities and threatening public health.

In April 2018, Apple announced that its retail stores, offices, data centers and co-located facilities are running on clean energy, mostly from solar panels and wind.

=== Hazardous Chemicals ===
In 1997, the first Apple products were tested for conformity to TCO Certified standards. TCO Certified standards involve requirements that cover a variety of issues: environment, ergonomics, usability, emission of electrical and magnetic fields, and energy consumption, and electrical fire safety. For example, environmental demands restrict the use of heavy metals, chlorinated solvents, and other various things. Mainly, products that are labeled must meet these environmental demands. Two years after Apple agreed to meet TCO Certified's standards, in 1999, Apple introduced "Apple Product Environmental Specifications (APES) files", in which lead and cadmium in cables were restricted. Shortly after, in 2000, all of Apple's manufacturing sites became ISO 14001 certified worldwide. This accredited that Apple had a structured environmental management system (EMS) in order to manage the environmental impact of their operations.

In June 2006, Apple temporarily stopped selling the eMac desktop computer and the AirPort wireless router in Europe, as they were non-compliant with the European Union's directive on harmful substances.

In 2007, Apple shareholders voted on a proposal to eliminate persistent and Bioaccumulative toxic chemicals, speed up the phase-out of toxic chemicals such as Polyvinyl chloride (PVC) and Brominated flame retardants (BFRs), and adopt a stronger e-waste "take-back" and recycling program. Shortly afterwards, Steve Jobs published an open letter claiming that "Apple is ahead of, or will soon be ahead of, most of its competitors in these areas". Apple was fined in 2007 by the Sacramento Metropolitan Air Quality Management Districts $43,200 for air quality violations at their Elk Grove facility in 2006.

In June 2017, the North Carolina Department of Environmental Quality fined Apple $40,000 for violations in its Maiden data center against the state's solid waste disposal laws. Apple had contracted Bloom Energy to dispose of its hazardous materials properly.

=== Pushback ===
In June 2020, the Supreme Court of Norway validated Apple's usage of trademark law to prevent repair shops from using refurbished parts.

In February 2022, the NewClimate Institute, a German environmental policy think tank, published a survey evaluating the transparency and progress of the climate strategies and carbon neutrality pledges announced by 25 major companies in the United States that found that Apple's carbon neutrality pledge and climate strategy was unsubstantiated and misleading.

In June 2024, the United States Environmental Protection Agency (EPA) published a report about an electronic computer manufacturing facility leased by Apple in 2015 in Santa Clara, California, code named Aria. The EPA report stated that Apple was potentially in violation of federal regulations under the Resource Conservation and Recovery Act (RCRA). According to a report from Bloomberg in 2018, the facility is used to develop microLED screens under the code name T159. The inspection found that Apple was potentially mistreating waste as only subject to California regulations and that they had potentially miscalculated the effectiveness of Apple's activated carbon filters, which filter volatile organic compounds (VOCs) from the air. The EPA inspected the facility in August 2023 due to a tip from a former Apple employee who posted the report on X.

== Planned obsolescence ==
The Apple company has often been accused of planned obsolescence – the idea that it deliberately manufactures its devices so that they seem obsolete before this is the case, typically with the intent of selling a 'new and improved' version. A class action lawsuit alleging planned obsolescence in the iOS 9 update was filed in New York state in December 2015. An online petition created by consumer group SumOfUs in July 2016 accused Apple of "sabotaging" devices with software upgrades designed to slow down older models. Another SumOfUs petition that reached over 300,000 signees in September 2016 also accused Apple of planned obsolescence by removing the standard headphone jack in the iPhone 7.

Upon its release, Apple stated that the iOS 10.2.1 update contained fixes to address unexpected shutdowns reported by some users, particularly on iPhone 6 and 6S models when they had 30% battery life remaining. In December 2017, Apple admitted that these changes included new power management routines that throttle the CPUs on older iPhone models (beginning with the first-generation iPhone SE and iPhone 6 series, and extended to the iPhone 7 series on iOS 11) in order to preserve system stability. Apple explained that the devices' batteries "become less capable of supplying peak current demands when in cold conditions, have a low battery charge or as they age over time, which can result in the device unexpectedly shutting down to protect its electronic component", and stated that these measures were part of efforts to "deliver the best experience for customers, which includes overall performance and prolonging the life of their devices".

Apple subsequently announced that through most of 2018, it would offer battery replacements at a discounted price (US$29, $50 cheaper than the normal cost for an out-of-warranty battery replacement) for existing iPhone models. The iOS 11.3 update would add a "Battery health" area to the system settings menu, allowing users to view the effective capacity of their device's battery, whether "performance management" had been enabled in order to preserve battery health and stability, and suggests when a battery replacement should be obtained. In January 2019, Apple CEO Tim Cook stated in a shareholder letter that over 11 million battery replacements had been made under the discount program.

The iPhone 12 and 12 Pro gained controversy in 2020 when it was discovered by iFixit and Australian tech YouTuber Hugh Jeffreys that a number of key components such as the cameras malfunction or display warnings if they are replaced with new ones or those taken from an otherwise identical donor unit. Internal Apple documents also mention that, beginning with the iPhone 12 and subsequent models, authorized technicians would have to run the phones through an internal System Configuration tool to reprogram repaired units in order to account for hardware changes. While Apple has yet to comment on the issue, the inability to replace key system components have raised concerns about right to repair and planned obsolescence.

== Criticism by Greenpeace ==
Greenpeace has criticized Apple for having products that they saw as unfriendly to the environment. In 2007, Greenpeace wrote an article explaining the hazardous materials that have been found in the iPhone, such as vinyl (PVC) plastic with phthalates, along with brominated compounds. Greenpeace also mentions in a different article from 2004 that Apple had refused to take the step of phasing out toxic chemicals in all of their products. They argued that Sony was removing toxins from their TVs, and that Samsung, Nokia, and Puma had also announced to phase out toxic chemicals in all of their products, yet Apple was not playing their part in the issue.

Because of Greenpeace's concern, they published a ranking guide in 2006 to improve policies and practices regarding the process of "going green". Greenpeace reached out to Apple's fans and consumers in attempt to gain the attention of Steve Jobs in September 2006. In order to do this, they launched a "Green my Apple" website that was designed to look like Apple's site. The caption on the site was, "I love my Mac. I just wish it came in green." They called this the "Green my Apple" campaign. Ultimately, their campaign was successful. Steve Jobs spoke of the company's desire to become greener in 2007.

Much later, in November 2012, Greenpeace created a ranking of companies in their progression toward greener products and waste management Apple moved up to number six (out of sixteen), just behind Dell. Number one was Wipro, and number sixteen was RIM. Apple scored a six due to the company's lack of transparency on GHG emission reporting, clean energy advocacy, further information on its management of toxic chemicals, and details on post-consumer recycled plastic use. Despite that Apple lost points on Greenpeace's e-waste criteria, Apple exceeded its 70% goal of global recycling in 2010. Greenpeace argues that the company can increase its score by setting an ambitious goal for boosting its renewable energy use by 2020. Apple also did not plan to phase out antimony or beryllium in their products, but overall, score well on the product criteria. For example, the MacBook Pro has been known for easy recycling.

Apple has been making progress since 2006 regarding greener tactics and products. Presently in 2013, Apple states that they achieve to power every Apple facility with energy from renewable sources. They have already achieved this goal at facilities in Austin, Cork, Munich, and at the Infinite Loop campus in Cupertino. Currently, Apple's corporate facilities worldwide are at 75% renewable energy.
