= Drunk Shakespeare =

2014 off-Broadway play

Drunk Shakespeare is an off-Broadway play created by Scott Griffin and David Hudson currently performing in New York City, Chicago, Washington D.C., Phoenix, and Houston. It premiered at Quinn's Bar and Grill in March 2014. As of Jan 2019, there have been over 2000 performances. It received a New York Times Critic's Pick saying "it seems inevitable that all performing will soon be done either plastered or stoned". Drunk Shakespeare follows a trend of drinking and performing popularized by the Comedy Central series Drunk History.

In 2023, the actors, stage managers, bartenders, and servers unionized as Drunk Shakespeare United.

== Premise ==
The show has five actors. One has between four and six shots of alcohol in front of the audience. The cast then attempts to perform one of Shakespeare's plays. The drunk actor can do anything they want and the four sober actors must follow their requests.

== Cast ==
As of October 2026, the NYC cast includes: Emma Brock, Gracie Lee Brown, Ryan Farnsworth, Christian Frost, Kevin Ganzekaufer, Morgan Haney, Craig Jackson, Howard Hendrix Powell, Travis Raeburn, Bell Reeves, Brandon Salerno, and Sky Young.
