= Eldim =

French optical company

Eldim S.A.
- Trade name: Eldim
- Company type: Private (Société Anonyme)
- Industry: Research and design of electronic, microelectronic, optoelectronic and electro-mechanical systems
- Founded: 1991; 35 years ago in Hérouville-Saint-Clair, France
- Founder: Thierry and François Leroux
- Headquarters: Hérouville-Saint-Clair, France
- Owner: Crédit Mutuel; Leroux Family (LRX Investissement); Siparex Xange Venture
- Number of employees: 87 (2024)
- Website: eldim.com

Eldim S.A. is a private French company that specializes in precision optics and facial recognition systems, based in Hérouville-Saint-Clair, Normandy. It was founded in 1991 by Thierry Leroux, a former researcher at the French Atomic Energy Commission (CEA). The company is one of Apple's subcontractors in Europe.

As of 2024, the company had 87 employees, up from 52 in 2004.

== History ==
In 1991, Thierry and Françoise Leroux founded Eldim, a company specializing in optical instrumentation for flat-screen colorimetry and photometry.

In May 2004, Eldim announced its entry into the medical sector with the development of two new quality control products for the treating cancer.

In October 2017, Apple CEO Tim Cook visited the company's headquarters to mark the release of the new iPhone X, featuring Apple's new "Face ID" facial recognition system, on which Eldim worked.

In September 2020, together with Normandy start-up Loop Dee Science and the virology laboratory at Caen University Hospital, it iwa developing a rapid PCR analysis kit that did not require a laboratory.

== See also ==
- Face ID
- Apple
