= Foxconn suicides =

Series of deaths in Foxconn City, China

The Foxconn suicides were a spate of suicides linked to low pay and brutal working conditions at the Foxconn City industrial park in Shenzhen, China, that occurred alongside several additional suicides in the early 2010s at various other Foxconn-owned locations and facilities in mainland China. The series of suicides drew attention from the press, and employment practices at Foxconn—one of the world's largest contract electronics manufacturers—were investigated by several of its customers, including Apple and Hewlett-Packard (HP).

== Events of suicide ==
=== Pre-2010 ===
While 2010 was a notable year for the company in the number of suicides, preceding years saw suicides being reported as well.

English name	Chinese name	Sex	Age	Suicide attempt date	Description	Status
Mr. Hou	Unknown; Family name: 侯	Male	19	18 Jun 2007	Hanged himself in a company bathroom.	Deceased
Sun Dan-yong	孙丹勇	Male	25	16 Jul 2009	Threw himself from an apartment building after losing an iPhone prototype in his possession. Before death, he stated that he was beaten and his residence searched by Foxconn employees.	Deceased

=== 2010 ===
English name	Chinese name	Sex	Age	Suicide attempt date	Description	Status
Ma Xiang-qian	马向前	Male	19	23 Jan 2010	Threw himself from building	Deceased
Mr. Li	Unknown; Family name: 李	Male	28	11 Mar 2010	Threw himself from building	Unknown
Tian Yu	田玉	Female	17	17 Mar 2010	Threw herself from building	Paralyzed from waist down
Mr. Lau	Unknown; Family name: 刘	Male	23	29 Mar 2010	Threw himself from building	Unknown
Rao Shu-qin	饶淑琴	Female	18	6 Apr 2010	Threw herself from building	Survived
Ms. Ning	Unknown; Family name: 宁	Female	18	7 Apr 2010	Threw herself from building	Deceased
Lu Xin	卢新	Male	24	6 May 2010	Threw himself from building	Deceased
Zhu Chen-ming	祝晨明	Female	24	11 May 2010	Threw herself from building	Deceased
Liang Chao	梁超	Male	21	14 May 2010	Threw himself from building	Deceased
Nan Gan	南刚	Male	21	21 May 2010	Threw himself from building	Deceased
Li Hai	李海	Male	19	25 May 2010	Threw himself from building	Deceased
Mr. He	Unknown; Family name: 贺	Male	23	26 May 2010	Threw himself from building	Unknown
Mr. Chen	Unknown; Family name: 陈	Male	25	27 May 2010	Suicide	Deceased
Mr. Liu	Unknown; Family name: 刘	Male	18	20 Jul 2010	Threw himself from the sixth floor of a dormitory building	Deceased
Unknown	Unknown	Male	23	5 Nov 2010	Threw himself from building	Deceased

=== 2011 ===
English name	Chinese name	Sex	Age	Suicide attempt date	Description	Status
Wang Ling	Unknown	Female	25	7 Jan 2011	Jumped from building after being sent to a psychiatric hospital	Deceased
Unknown	Unknown	Male	20	26 May 2011	Threw himself from building. Died in Deyuan town, Chengdu (possibly in Pi County)	Deceased
Mr. Cai	Unknown; Family name: 蔡	Male	21	July 2011	Threw himself from building at Shenzhen plant.	Deceased
Li Rongying	Unknown	Female	20	23 November 2011	Threw herself from building	Deceased

=== 2012 ===
English name	Chinese name	Sex	Age	Suicide attempt date	Description	Status
Unknown	Unknown	Male	23	14 June 2012	Threw himself from building	Deceased

Additionally, 150 Chinese workers threatened suicide in protest on 2 January 2012.

=== 2014 ===
English name	Chinese name	Sex	Age	Suicide attempt date	Description	Status
Xu Lizhi	许立志	Male	24	30 September 2014	Threw himself from building	Deceased

=== 2016 ===
Eva Dou of The Wall Street Journal reported the suicide of a 31-year-old night shift worker at Foxconn's production building in Zhengzhou on 18 August 2016.

=== 2018 ===
English name	Chinese name	Sex	Age	Suicide attempt date	Description	Status
Li Ming	李明	Male	31	6 January 2018	Threw himself from building	Deceased

== Response ==
=== Foxconn clients ===
Apple issued a public statement about the suicides, and company spokesperson Steven Dowling said "[Apple is] saddened and upset by the recent suicides at Foxconn... A team from Apple is independently evaluating the steps they are taking to address these tragic events, and we will continue our ongoing inspections of the facilities where our products are made." The statement was released after the results from the company's probe into its suppliers' labor practices were published in early 2010. Foxconn was not specifically named in the report, but Apple suggested poor treatment of workers in facilities that manufacture its products may include violations of labor laws, violations of Apple's own rules for suppliers, and child labor (workers as young as 14 could legally work in China through special programs around the time this report was compiled).

Apple committed to the implementation of changes following the suicides, but in late 2014 news reports of labor issues at another factory of a Chinese supplier also surfaced.

=== Reports ===
The 2010 suicides prompted twenty Chinese universities to compile an 83-page report on Foxconn, which they described as a "labor camp". Interviews of 1,800 Foxconn workers at 12 factories found evidence of illegal overtime and failure to report accidents. The report also criticized Foxconn's management style, which it called inhumane and abusive. Additionally, long working hours, discrimination towards Mainland Chinese workers by their Taiwanese coworkers, and a lack of working relationships were all presented as potential problems in the university report.

A 2012 audit of Foxconn performed by the Fair Labor Association, at the request of Apple Inc., suggested that workplace accidents might be commonplace and that workers may consider overtime pay insufficient.

=== Crisis management ===
During the first two and a half months, which included six of the fourteen deaths from suicide, Foxconn took a "no comment" approach to their business crisis. This left them vulnerable to attacks from the press, allowing news media to fill in their own information about the suicides. Li and Xu made a statement, in their case study about the business' suicides, that "Foxconn's series of employee suicides were severe events in the mind of the general public, and its 'no comment' strategy led to a more negative perception of its reputation and severe consequences." After the sixth suicide, Liu Kun, a spokesperson for Foxconn, stated that they were handling the crisis. He also started using a "denial strategy" to avoid any blame for the suicides and instead directed the fault at "the victims and societal problems."

One of the ways Foxconn started handling the crisis was to require that employees sign a waiver stating that Foxconn would not be made liable if any individuals were to die by suicide. This, however, caused more troubles for Foxconn and they eventually retracted the document. After they removed the waiver, they installed safety netting around the facility to prevent future suicides. Foxconn also implemented a pay raise from 950 yuan to 1200 yuan, but they in turn increased their quota by 20% as well. Lastly, Foxconn opened their doors to two-hundred journalists. Foxconn informed the writers that they were taking extra steps for the future; which included safety netting and more help hotlines for employees to be able to call.

=== Foxconn ===
The chairman of Foxconn, Terry Gou, made the following statement at a press conference focused on the controversy: "We are certainly not running a sweatshop. We are confident we'll be able to stabilize the situation soon. A manufacturing team of 800,000 people is very difficult to manage." At the time of the company's press conference, the factory complex where the deaths occurred employed up to 300,000 people.

In response to the suicides, Foxconn substantially increased wages for its Shenzhen factory workforce, installed suicide-prevention netting, brought in Buddhist monks to conduct prayer sessions and asked employees to sign no-suicide pledges. Workers were also required to sign a legally-binding document guaranteeing that they and their descendants would not sue the company as a result of unexpected death, self-injury or suicide.

=== Protests ===
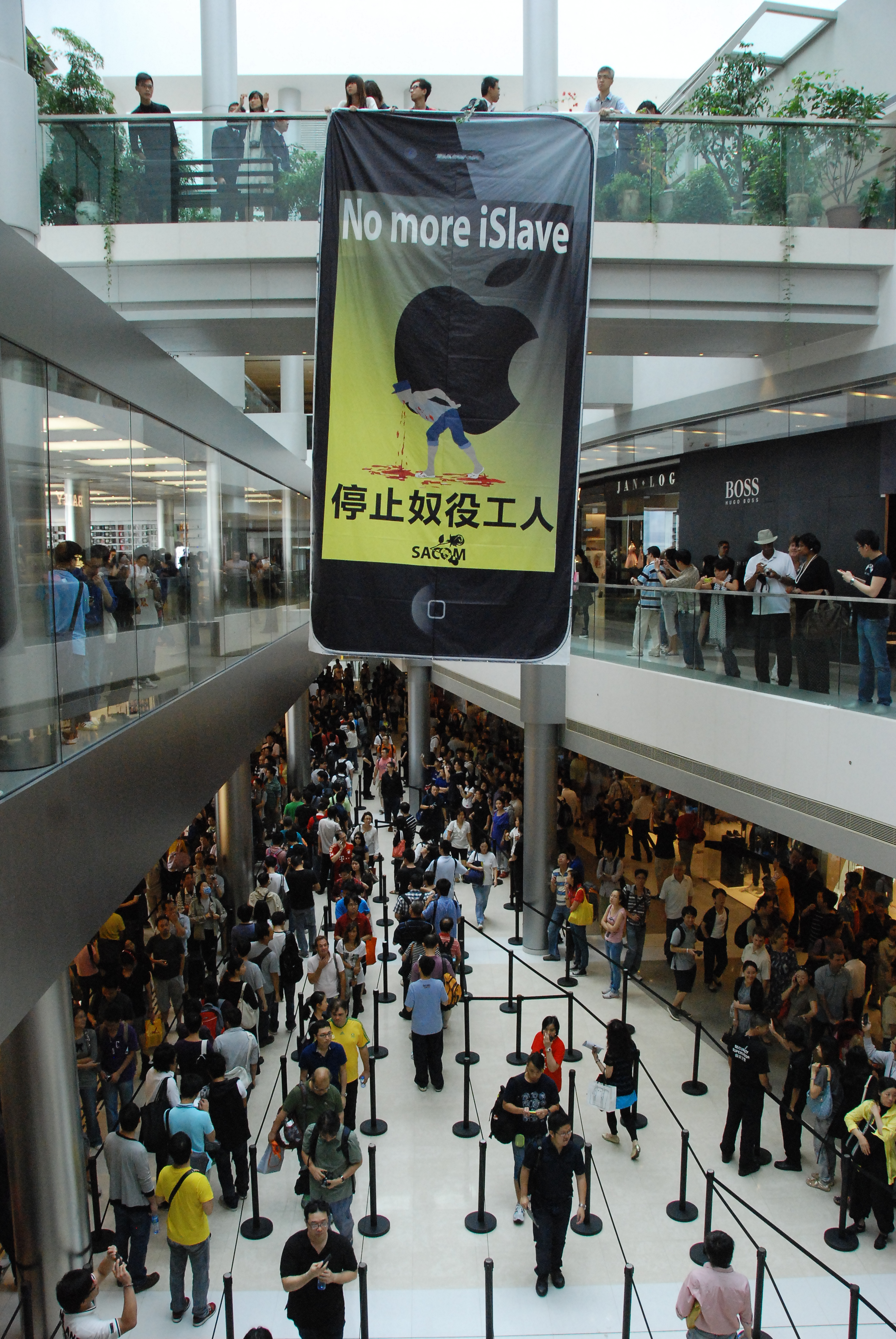
SACOM protests in 2013 at the opening of the first Apple Store in Hong Kong over labor rights violations in its supplier factories Foxconn and Wintek

In May 2010, the Students & Scholars Against Corporate Misbehaviour (SACOM) group held a protest in the lobby of Foxconn's Hong Kong headquarters. Around 25 protestors laid mannequins to rest and conducted funeral rites, while a spokesperson informed the media and onlookers: "We are staging the protest because of the high death rate [at Foxconn], with an abnormal number of workers committing suicide in the past five months". Activists from the Hong Kong Confederation of Trade Unions were also present and held signs that read "Foxconn lacks a conscience" and "Suicide is no accident". They also burned cardboard cutouts resembling iPhones.

The family of Ma Xianqian, one of the dead workers, protested outside the Foxconn factory. On 28 May 2010, demonstrators protested outside Hon Hai's Taipei headquarters, laying flowers for those who had died at the Foxconn plant. Taiwanese unions and labor activists were also present at the Taipei protest and displayed banners that displayed Chinese text that translates into English as: "For wealth and power—physical and mental health spent, hopes lost" and "For profit of the brand—youth spent, dreams shattered".

On 8 June 2010, the date of Foxconn's Annual General Meeting, student protesters from SACOM, Hong Kong labor unions and rights groups demonstrated outside a Hong Kong Apple store.

A small group of young organizers picketed at an Apple store in San Francisco on 17 June 2010. The protesters carried placards showing the names and ages of the dead workers.

== In pop culture ==
The Foxconn suicides have become the basis of works including the song "Chairman Gou" by James Supercave. The song mentions two persons involved in the incident, Chairman Terry Gou and Lu Xin. The content of the song is specifically referencing the suicide of 24 year old Chinese rural migrant worker Lu Xin, who died by suicide at the Shenzhen factory on 6 May 2010, certified dead onsite. By the end of May, CEO Terry Gou brought in psychiatrists to offer advice to depressed workers over phone and installed "safety nets" to deter employees from jumping off a building. This is reflected in the lines "Hire a hundred telephones/To talk the kids out of meaninglessness" and "Pay the right man to build a suicide net".

In the webnovel The Earthly Master by Xu Shengzhi, the protagonist works on feng shui cases, one of which is the Foxconn suicides.

== See also ==
- Labor relations in China
- 2010 Chinese labour unrest
- France Télécom staff suicides
- Suicide in the People's Republic of China
- Xu Lizhi
