= Students and Scholars Against Corporate Misbehaviour =

Students and Scholars Against Corporate Misbehaviour (SACOM; Chinese: 大學師生監察無良企業行動) is a non-government organization founded in 2005 by a group of students and scholars from tertiary institutions in Hong Kong. SACOM monitors and publicizes the misconducts of multinational corporations (e.g. Apple Inc., Disney) through first-hand investigations in supplier factories.

== Major campaigns ==
=== Toys and gifts ===
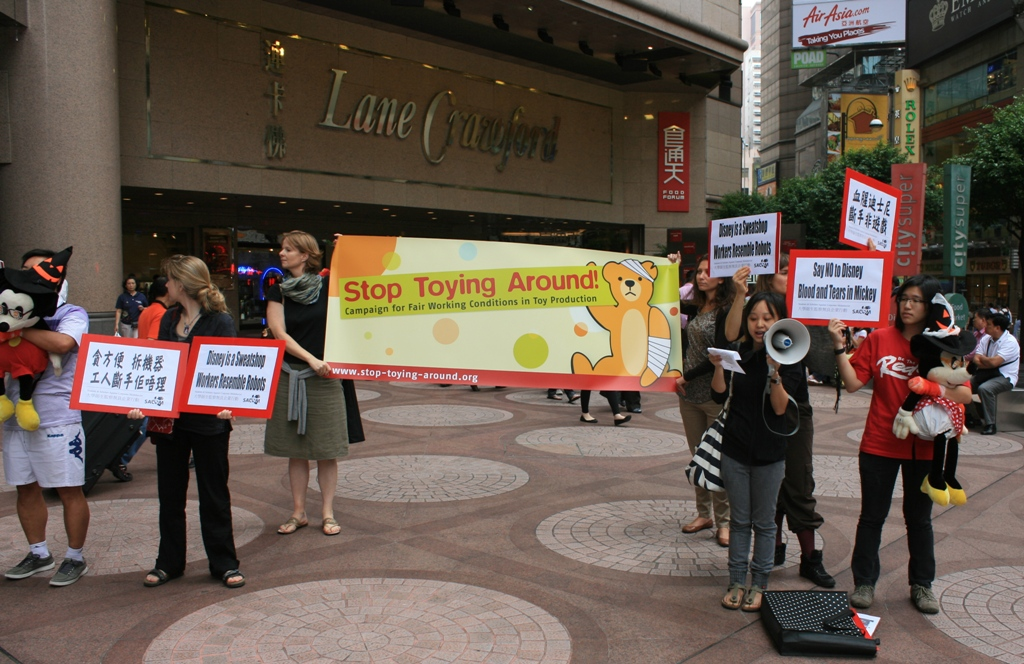
SACOM's protest in Oct 2010 against the Disney sweatshop practice.

In August 2005, SACOM launched the debut campaign called Looking For Mickey Mouse's Conscience amid the opening of Hong Kong Disneyland. It aimed to advocate conscience consumption against sweatshop products such as Disney toys and gifts. SACOM's follow-up investigations exposed the frequent labour rights violations in Disney's supplier factories, and there has been little improvement over years.

In August 2009, SACOM and Stop Toying Around jointly published the report titled Exploitations of Toy Factory Workers at the Bottom of Global Supply Chain. The report highlighted the poor working conditions within Chinese supplier factories of famous brands such as Disney, Mattel and Walmart. These factories adopted the ICTI Care Process, a so-called ethical manufacturing certification programme. It was found that the certification process non-transparent and unaccountable to the public, workers and civil society, becoming a de facto cover for labour rights infringement for global toy brands.

In January 2012, SACOM released its investigative findings regarding to the production of Wenlock and Mandeville, the official mascots of 2012 London Olympics and Paralympics, and pointed out the production process violated the Sustainable Sourcing Code of London Organising Committee of the Olympic and Paralympic Games (LOCOG).

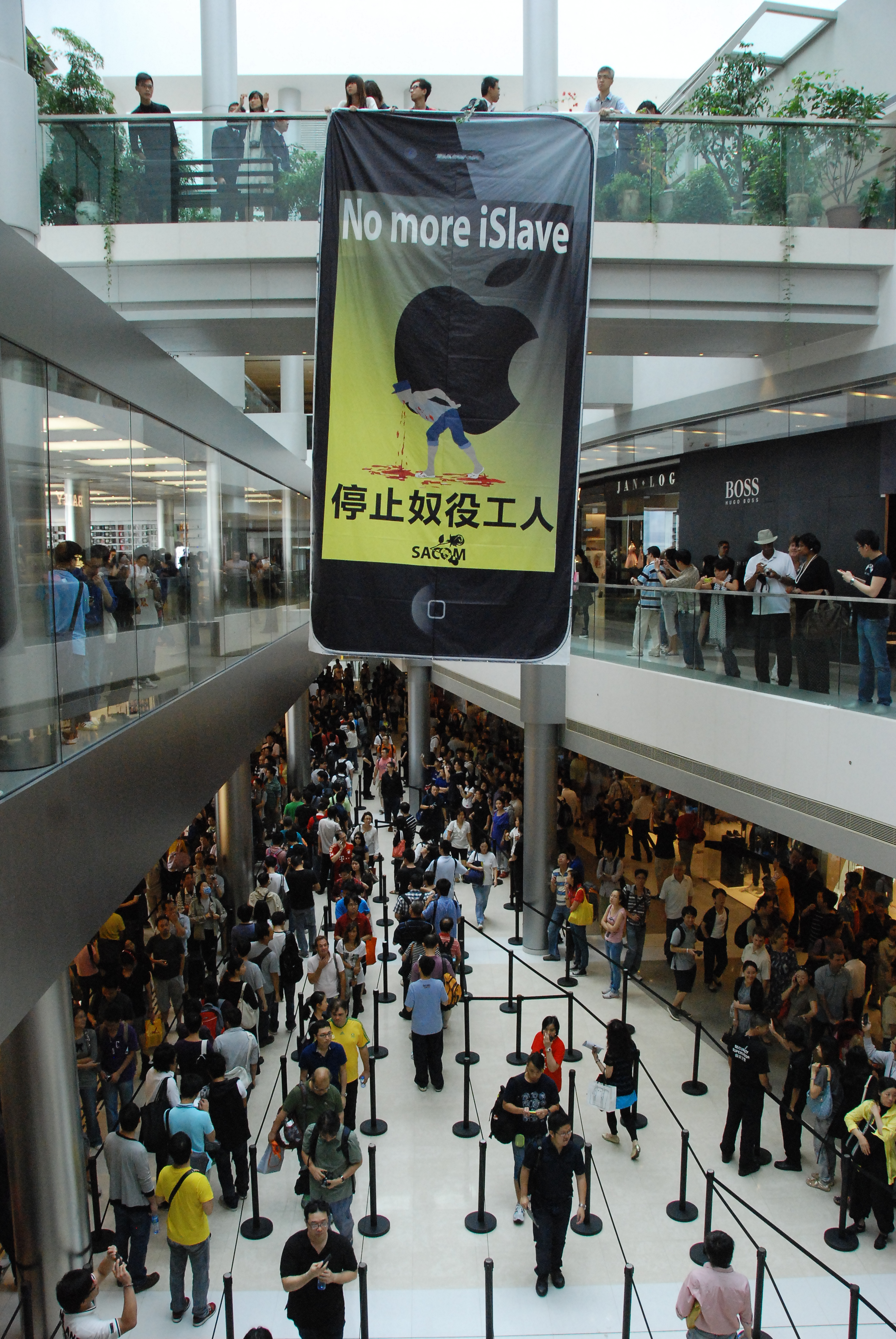
SACOM protests at the opening of the first Apple Store in Hong Kong against the serious labour rights abuse in its supplier factories such as Foxconn and Wintek.

=== Electronics ===
In 2010, SACOM launched investigative reports on Apple in response to the serial suicides in Foxconn and the mass n-hexane poisoning in Wintek (Suzhou), both of which are Apple's major suppliers. SACOM urged Apple to take responsibility for the poisoning and suicides, for its ethical codes were violated in the production of iPhones and iPads. Subsequent investigations of SACOM in Apple's Chinese supplier factories made the shocking discoveries that Foxconn treated its workers as machines and enforced military management.

In February 2011, SACOM released the report Game console and music player production in China jointly with makeITfair”’,“SOMO” and “Finnwatch”, which investigated the supplier factories of Apple, Microsoft, Motorola, Phillips and Sony. The study revealed that their workers’ working hours exceeded the statutory limit while being paid far below the living wage. In addition, the workers were unable to form genuine unions to protect their own rights.

=== Clothing ===
In December 2005, SACOM's report on Giordano revealed the alleged labour right abuses in its supplier factories, and demanded Giordano to fulfill its monitoring responsibilities.

In July 2012, SACOM jointly published the investigation results with IHLO Hong Kong Liaison Office, War on Want (WoW) and Clean Clothes Campaign (CCC) concerning the use of sandblasting for distressing jeans, which can cause workers fatal silicosis disease. Sandblasting was found to be still commonly used in the Chinese suppliers of Western brands including Abercrombie & Fitch and H&M, despite many brands announced during 2010–2011 to ban the practice.

== Support programmes ==
SACOM supported the Coke Concerned Student Group in Mainland China, which aims to improve the working conditions of bottling plants in China.

SACOM also collaborated with other Hong Kong NGOs to train the employees of all levels in two HP supplier factories in Dongguan, China, to enhance their understanding of labour rights.
