= Compal Electronics =

Taiwanese contract Notebook manufacturer

Compal Electronics, Inc.

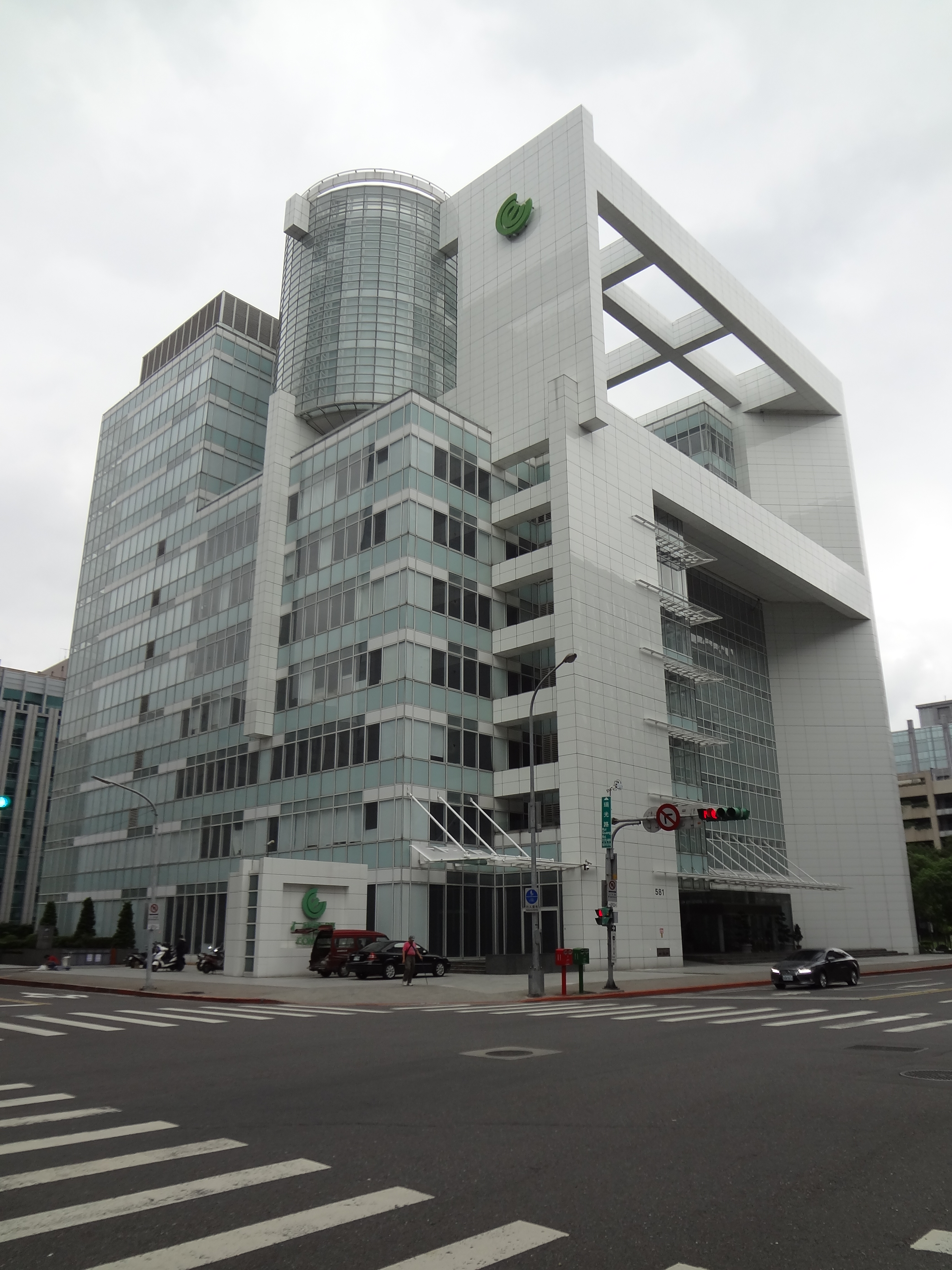
- Headquarters in Neihu, Taipei
- Type: Public
- Traded as: TWSE: 2324
- Industry: Computer hardware Electronics
- Founded: June 1, 1984; 42 years ago Taipei, Taiwan
- Founder: Chau-Ing Hsu; Sheng-Hsiung Hsu; Wen-Being Hsu; Charng-Chyi Ko
- Headquarters: Neihu, Taipei, Taiwan
- Key people: Ray Chen (Chairman); Anthony Peter Bonadero (President & CEO)
- Products: Notebooks, PDAs, televisions, and others
- Revenue: ▲US$31 billion (2023)
- Number of employees: Over 60,000 worldwide
- Website: www.compal.com

Compal Electronics, Inc. (Chinese: 仁寶電腦工業股份有限公司) is a Taiwanese original design manufacturer (ODM), handling the production of notebook computers, smart phones, tablets, televisions, wearable devices, and more for a variety of clients around the world, including Apple, Alphabet, Acer, Caterpillar, Cisco, Dell, Fujitsu, Framework, Hewlett-Packard, Lenovo, Panasonic, Sony, Toshiba, and many more.

As of December 2023, it was ranked #420 on the Fortune Global 500 list.

== Overview ==
The company is listed on the Taiwan Stock Exchange (TWSE). As of December 2023, the company had annual revenue of NT$947 billion (US$31 billion), with over 60,000 employees across the world. The company's headquarters is located in Taipei, Taiwan, with offices in mainland China, South Korea, Poland, Brazil, Vietnam, the United Kingdom, and the United States. Compal's main production facility is located in Kunshan, China.

Compal is the second largest notebook manufacturer in the world after Quanta Computer, also based in Taiwan.

== History ==
Compal was founded in June 1984 as a computer peripherals supplier. It went public in April 1990.

In September 2011, Compal announced it would form a joint venture with Lenovo to make laptops in China. The venture was expected to start producing laptops by the end of 2012.

In January 2015, Toshiba announced that due to intense price competition, it will stop selling televisions in the US and will instead license the Toshiba TV brand to Compal.

In September 2018, it was revealed that due to overwhelming demand for the Apple Watch, Compal was brought on as a second contract manufacturer to produce the Apple Watch Series 4.

== CCI ==
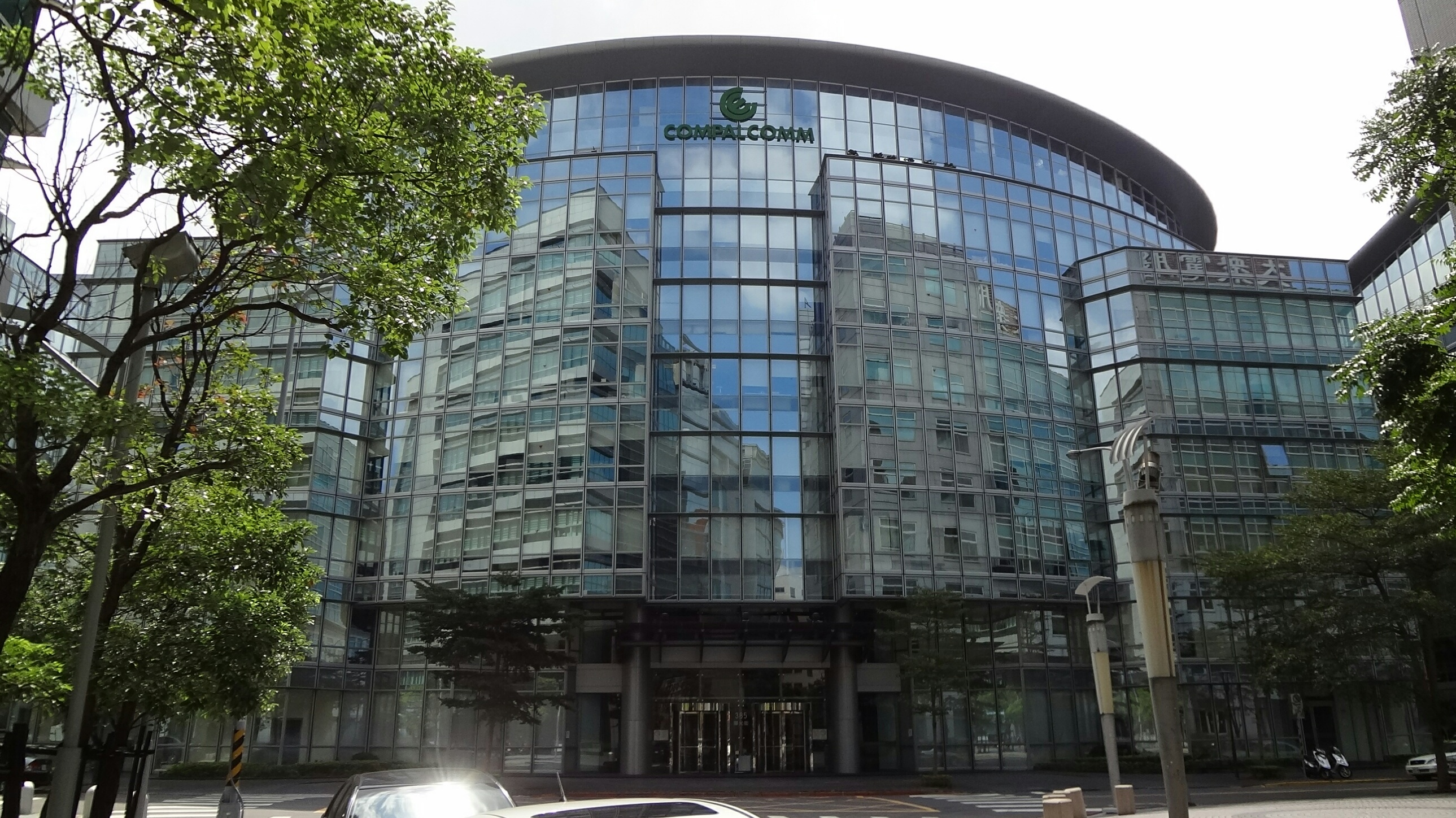
Compal Communications headquarters

Compal subsidiary Compal Communications (華寶通訊, CCI) is a major manufacturer of mobile phones. The phones are produced on an ODM basis, i.e., the handsets are sold through other brands. In 2006, CCI produced 68.8 million handsets and was the largest mobile handset ODM in the world. CCI's largest customer by far was Motorola. Motorola's volumes have been reduced year by year, and CCI's volumes have followed. In 2007, the volume was 48.7 million.

== See also ==
- List of companies of Taiwan
