= Wintek =

Electronic manufacturing company of Taiwan

- Native name: 勝華科技股份有限公司
- Company type: Public
- Traded as: TWSE: 2384
- Founded: 1990; 36 years ago
- Defunct: October 2014
- Fate: Bankrupted
- Headquarters: Taichung, Taiwan
- Website: www.wintek.com.tw

Wintek was a Taiwanese maker of electronic components, mainly touch screens for devices such as Apple's iPhone. Its headquarters was in Taichung, Taiwan.

== History ==
Wintek was established in 1990 and produces components in Taiwan, India, China and Vietnam.

== Worker illness controversy ==
In May 2010 it emerged that employees in China producing touchscreens for the iPhone had been poisoned by a cleaning chemical called n-hexane, leading to nerve damage and in some cases paralysis. n-Hexane was introduced into the production process because it evaporates very quickly, thus speeding the manufacturing. A hospital in Suzhou has treated more than 100 workers who breathed in the hexane vapours. Some workers have been hospitalized for more than six months. While some workers have said that Wintek paid their medical bills and promises to keep their jobs for them while on medical leave, under Chinese law these workers will only get compensation if they leave these jobs.

== Bankruptcy ==
In October 2014, Wintek filed for bankruptcy protection as it was hit hard by poor sales of panels for personal computers and a marketing offensive by Chinese competitors in the smartphone panel sector.
