= Criticism of McDonald's =

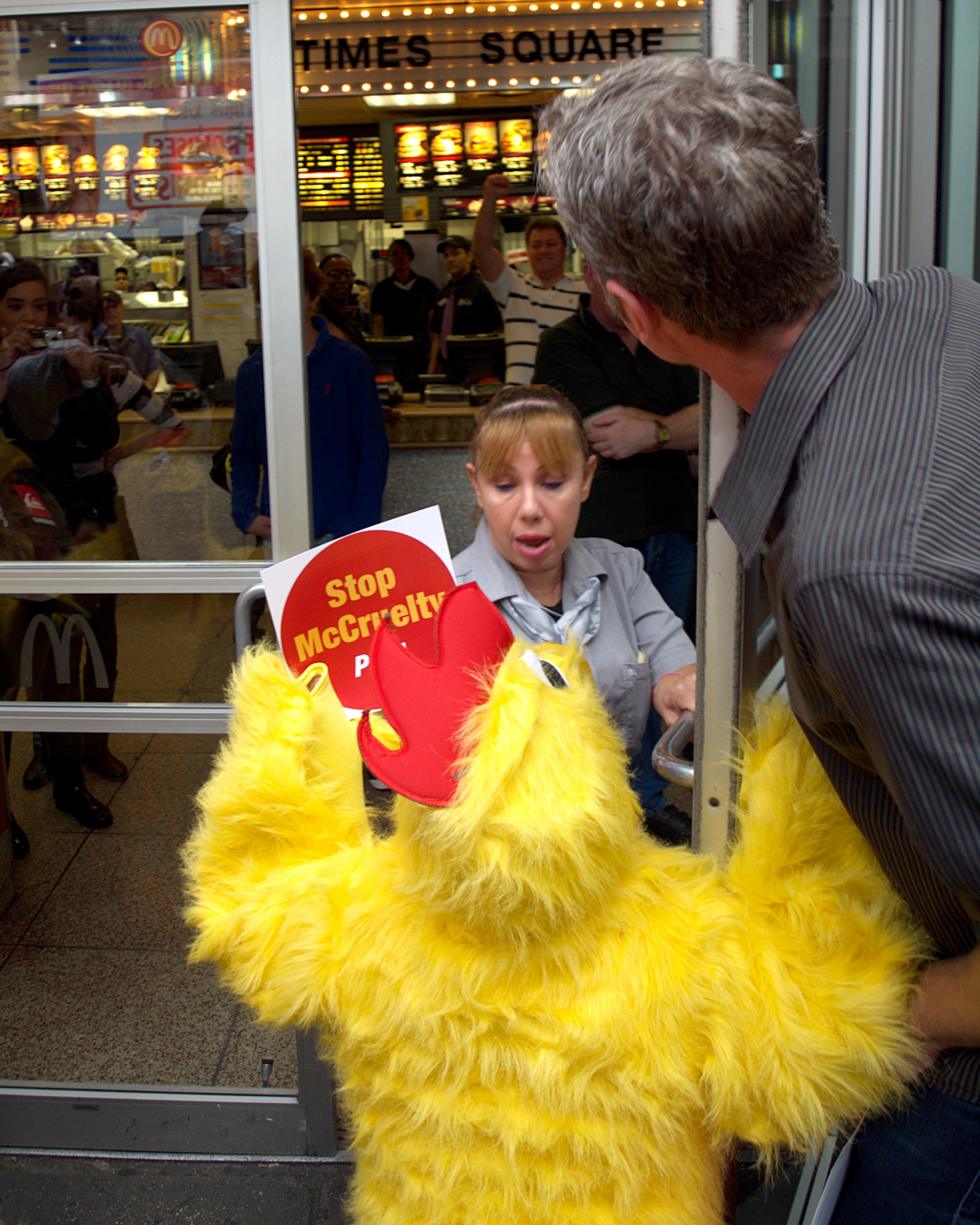
A PETA activist dressed as a chicken confronts the manager of the Times Square McDonald's over the company's animal welfare standards.

The American restaurant chain McDonald's has been criticised for numerous aspects of its business, including the health effects of its products, its treatment of employees, the environmental impact of its operations, and other business practices.

== Food ==
In the late 1980s, Phil Sokolof, a millionaire businessman who had suffered a heart attack at the age of 43, took out full-page newspaper ads in New York, Chicago, and other large cities accusing McDonald's menu of being a threat to American health, and asking them to stop using beef tallow to cook their french fries.

In 1990, activists from a small group known as London Greenpeace (no connection to the international group Greenpeace) distributed leaflets entitled What's wrong with McDonald's?, criticizing its environmental, health, and labor record. The corporation wrote to the group demanding they desist and apologize, and, when two of the activists refused to back down, sued them for libel leading to the "McLibel case", one of the longest cases in English civil law. A documentary film of the McLibel Trial has been shown in several countries.

In 2001, Eric Schlosser's book Fast Food Nation included criticism of the business practices of McDonald's. Among the critiques were allegations that McDonald's (along with other companies within the fast food industry) uses its political influence to increase its profits at the expense of people's health and the social conditions of its workers. The book also brought into question McDonald's advertisement techniques in which it targets children. While the book did mention other fast-food chains, it focused primarily on McDonald's.

In 2002, vegetarian groups, largely Hindu and Buddhist, successfully sued McDonald's for misrepresenting its French fries as vegetarian, when they contained beef broth. In the same year, Spanish band Ska-P released a song titled "McDollar" in their album ¡¡Que Corra La Voz!! criticizing McDonald's.

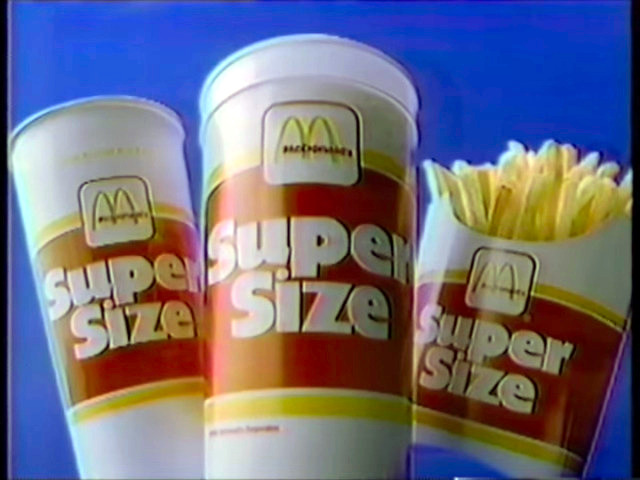
McDonald's eliminated "super size" options six weeks after the premiere of the 2004 documentary Super Size Me.

Morgan Spurlock's 2004 documentary film Super Size Me claimed that McDonald's food was contributing to the increase of obesity in society and that the company was failing to provide nutritional information about its food for its customers. Six weeks after the film premiered, McDonald's announced that it was eliminating the super size option, and was creating the adult Happy Meal. A counter-documentary called Fat Head purported to point out inconsistencies in Super Size Me.

=== Company responses to criticism ===
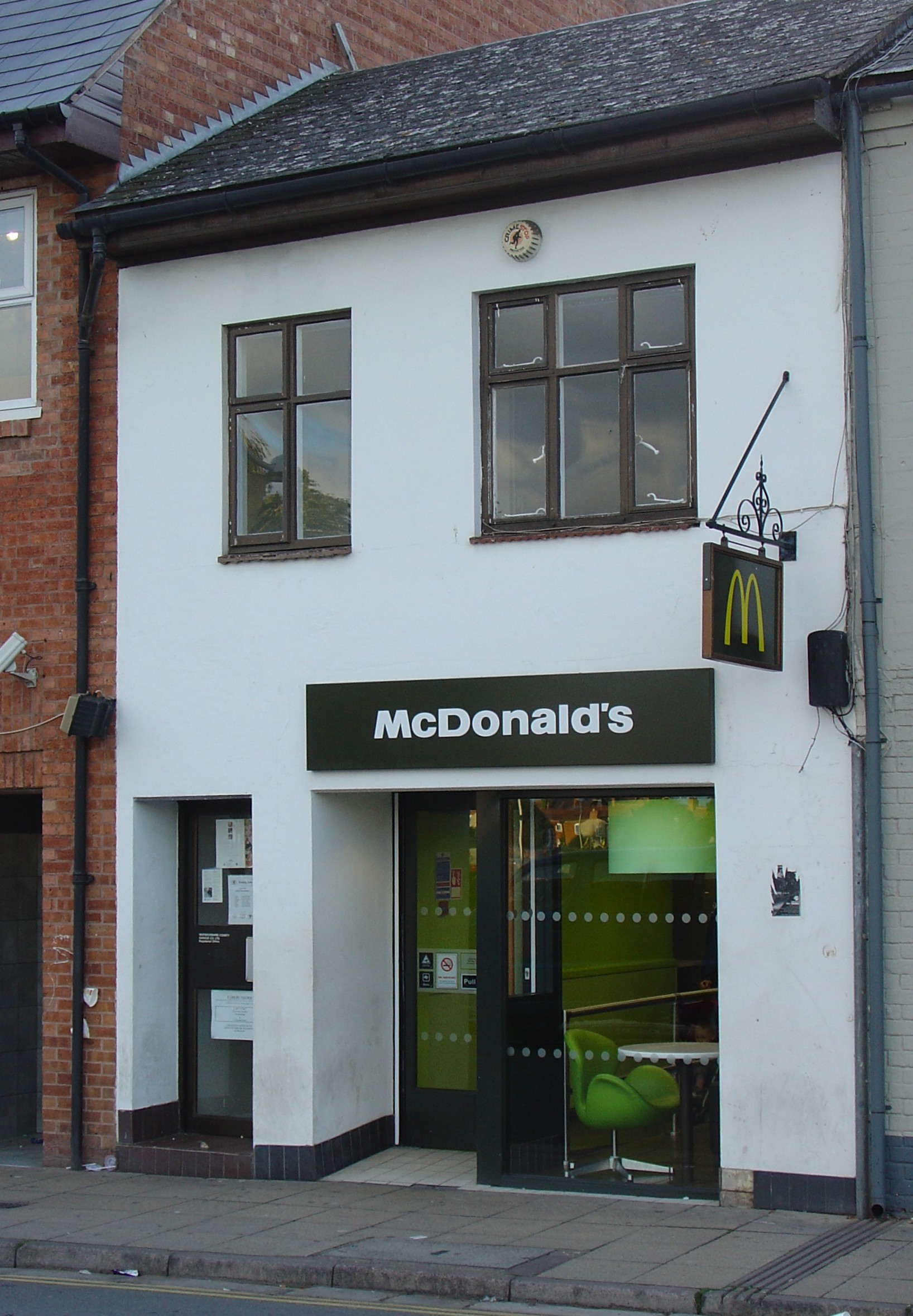
Discreet shopfront in historic Stratford-upon-Avon

In response to public pressure, McDonald's has sought to include more healthy choices in its menu and has introduced a new slogan to its recruitment posters: "Not bad for a McJob". The word McJob, first attested in the mid-1980s and later popularized by Canadian novelist Douglas Coupland in his book Generation X: Tales for an Accelerated Culture, has become a buzzword for low-paid, unskilled work with few prospects or benefits and little security. McDonald's disputes this definition of McJob. In 2007, the company launched an advertising campaign with the slogan "Would you like a career with that?" on Irish television, asserting that its jobs have good prospects.

In an effort to respond to growing consumer awareness of food provenance, the fast-food chain changed its supplier of both coffee beans and milk. UK chief executive Steve Easterbrook said: "British consumers are increasingly interested in the quality, sourcing, and ethics of the food and drink they buy". In a bid to tap into the ethical consumer market, McDonald's switched to using coffee beans taken from stocks that are certified by the Rainforest Alliance, a conservation group. Additionally, in response to pressure, McDonald's UK started using organic milk supplies for its bottled milk and hot drinks, although it still uses conventional milk in its milkshakes, and in all of its dairy products in the United States. According to a report published by Farmers Weekly in 2007, the quantity of milk used by McDonald's could have accounted for as much as 5 percent of the UK's organic milk output.

McDonald's announced in May 2008 that, in the United States and Canada, it has switched to using cooking oil that contains no trans fats for its french fries, and canola-based oil with corn and soy oils, for its baked items, pies and cookies, by the end of 2018.

With regard to acquiring chickens from suppliers who use CAK/CAS methods of slaughter, McDonald's says that it needs to see more research "to help determine whether any CAS system in current use is optimal from an animal welfare perspective."

== Corporate practices ==
Though the company objected, the term "McJob" was added to Merriam-Webster's Collegiate Dictionary in 2003. The term was defined as "a low-paying job that requires little skill and provides little opportunity for advancement". Merriam-Webster's Unabridged Dictionary also contains the word "McMansion", a critical, pejorative term used to describe an overly large, ostentatious, sometimes poorly designed or constructed house, often found in a suburb or in new developments on traditionally rural land. McMansions are often built in multiples that are difficult to distinguish from one another, like assembly-line factory parts or fast-food hamburgers.

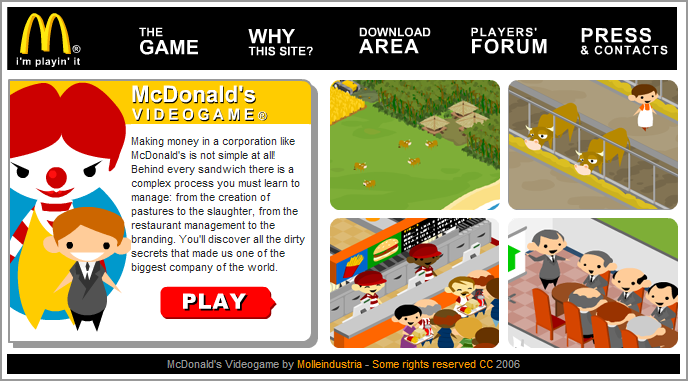
Screenshot from McDonald's Video Game, a satirical parody of the company's business practices

In 2006, an unsanctioned McDonald's Video Game by Italian group Molleindustria was released online. It is a parody of the business practices of the corporate giant, taking the guise of a tycoon style business simulation game. In the game, the player plays the role of a McDonald's CEO, choosing whether or not to use controversial practices like genetically altered cow feed, plowing over rainforests, and corrupting public officials. McDonald's issued a statement distancing itself from the game.

In January 2014, McDonald's was accused of having used a series of tax maneuvers to avoid taxes in France. French authorities have fined McDonald's France in 2016 300 million euros for unpaid taxes on profit.

In April 2020, McDonald's apologized after footage showing a notice that was being displayed inside one of its restaurants in China saying that "black people are not allowed to enter."

In October 2020, the Azerbaijan branch of McDonald's was criticized for Facebook and Instagram posts endorsing Azerbaijan's military actions against Armenia in Nagorno-Karabakh. While McDonald's restaurants exist in Armenia, as of January 2020, none of them were franchises of the global chain.

June 2023 saw McDonald's receive scrutiny for removing and replacing content on the fan-run McDonald's Wiki on Fandom with advertising. The company paid Fandom an undisclosed amount to temporarily replace the page about Grimace, which originally detailed the history of the character, into an advertisement promoting the chain's Grimace Shake. The decision was vocally protested by Nathan Steinmetz, author of the Grimace article, arguing that the effort he placed into sourcing and writing the article was thrown down the drain in order to promote the product. Steinmetz further credited wikis as among the last places where people share knowledge unconditionally, stating to multiple outlets that the move by Fandom set a "really bad precedent that an IP holder can approach Fandom or whoever and have user generated content basically ‘suppressed’ and replaced with a press release".

In April 2024, a McDonald's in Nantong, China apologized to a customer after the word "shǎbī" was written on his receipt for a refund. They assured the employee responsible has been reprimanded, and promised to improve staff training and customer service procedures.

Although McDonald's has a policy against abuse of staff, reports in the UK have shown numerous cases of sexual and racial abuse by managers towards younger employees.

== Environmental record ==
Since McDonald's began receiving criticism for its environmental practices in the 1970s, it has significantly reduced its use of materials. For instance, an "average meal" in the 1970s—a Big Mac, fries, and a drink—required 46 grams (1.6 oz) of packaging; today, it requires 25 grams (0.88 oz), a 46 percent reduction. In addition, McDonald's eliminated the need for intermediate containers for cola by using a delivery system that pumps syrup directly from the delivery truck into storage containers, saving two million pounds (910 tonnes) of packaging annually. Weight reductions in packaging and products, as well as increased usage of bulk packaging, ultimately decreased packaging by twenty-four million pounds (11,000 tonnes) annually. McDonald's efforts to reduce solid waste by using less packaging and by promoting the use of recycled materials were recognized by the U.S. Environmental Protection Agency.

In April 2008, McDonald's announced that 11 of its restaurants in Sheffield, England, were engaged in a biomass trial program that cut its waste and carbon footprint by half in the area. In this trial, waste from the restaurants was collected by Veolia Environmental Services and used to produce energy at a power plant. McDonald's announced plans to expand this project, although the lack of biomass power plants in the United States would prevent adoption of this plan as a national standard there anytime soon. In addition, in Europe, McDonald's has been recycling vegetable grease by converting it to fuel for its diesel trucks.

In an effort to reduce energy usage by 25 percent in its restaurants, McDonald's opened a prototype restaurant in Chicago in 2009, intending to use the model in its other restaurants throughout the world. Building on past efforts, specifically a restaurant it opened in Sweden in 2000 that was the first to incorporate green ideas, McDonald's designed the Chicago site to save energy by managing storm water, using skylights for more natural lighting, and installing partitions and tabletops made from recycled goods, among other measures.

In 2012, McDonald's announced they would trial replacing styrofoam coffee cups with an alternative material.

In 2018, McDonalds switched from plastic straws to paper ones in Ireland and the United Kingdom and Australia in an effort to reduce plastic pollution. The Netherlands followed suit in 2020, so did Germany in 2021.

In January 2021, McDonald's Arcos Dorados, the largest independent McDonald's franchise in the world which operates stores in Latin America and the Caribbean, introduced food trays manufactured by UBQ Materials that use a mix of food waste by-products to reduce the use of virgin plastic.

McDonald's uses a corn-based bioplastic to produce containers for some products. The environmental benefits of this technology are controversial, with critics noting that biodegradation is slow and produces greenhouse gases, and that contamination of traditional plastic waste streams with bioplastics can complicate recycling efforts.

Studies of litter have found that McDonald's is one of the most littered brands worldwide. In 2012, a Keep Australia Beautiful study found that McDonald's was the most littered brand in Queensland. In 2009, Keep Britain Tidy likewise found McDonald's to be the leading producer of fast-food litter on British streets, accounting for 29% of the total. An early protest against this practice was "Operation Send-It-Back", launched by London Greenpeace in 1994 in response to the company's targeting of activists in the McLibel Trial. Participants in Operation Send-It-Back returned 30 sacks of McDonald's litter to the company. In the 2010s, similar individual protests took place in New Zealand and England.

=== Animal cruelty ===
McDonald's has been the subject of animal rights activism. In 2021, Animal Rising blockaded four UK distribution centers using bamboo towers, leading to food shortages at restaurants. They cited "suffering of animals" in the McDonald's supply chain as a motivating factor.

== Controversy in Israeli-Palestinian conflict ==
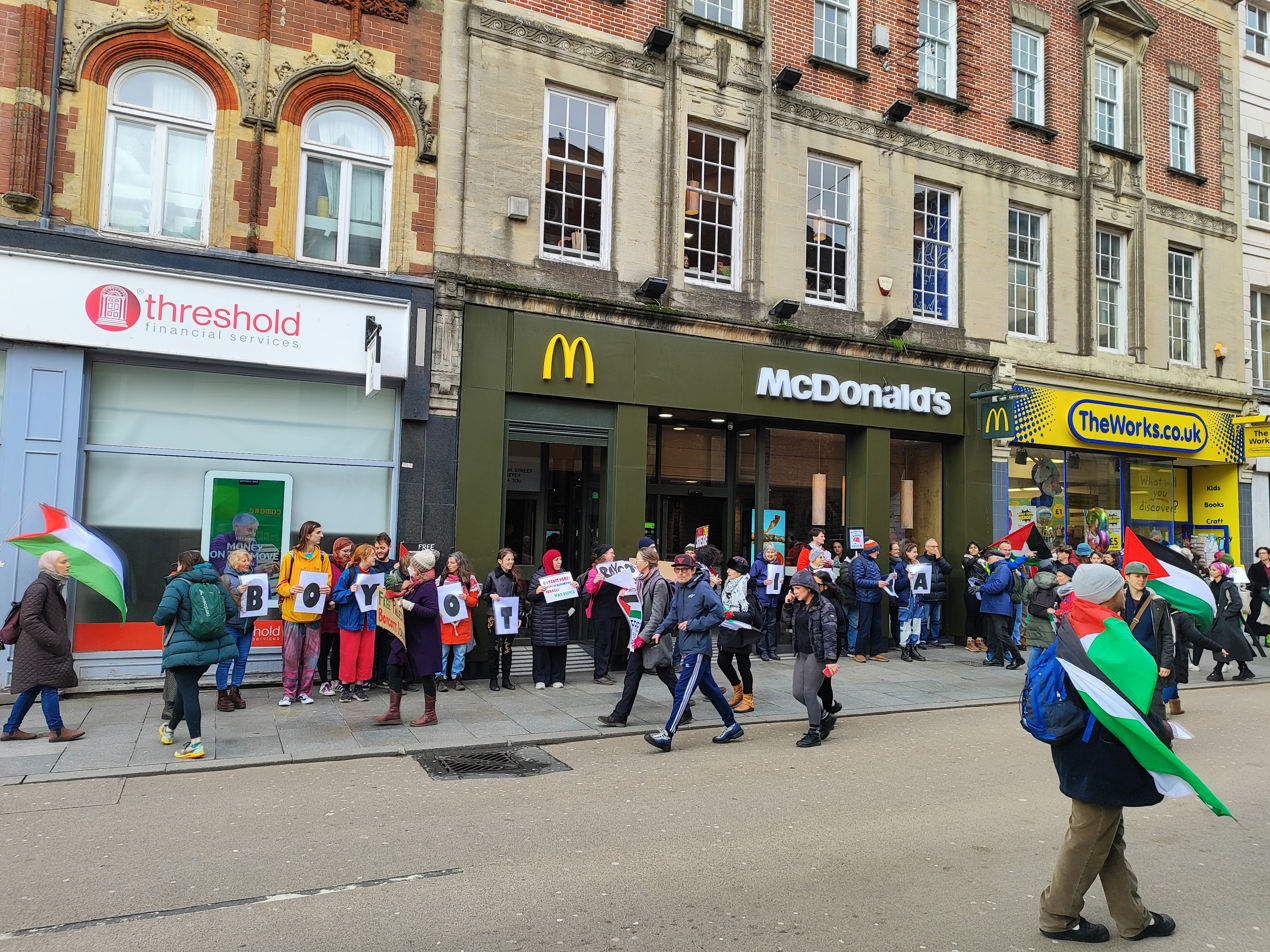
Pro-Palestinian protest outside McDonald's in Exeter, England on 10 February 2024

During the Gaza war, amidst the Israeli blockade of supplies in Gaza, McDonald's in Israel was condemned after giving free food to the Israel Defense Forces who were accused of committing war crimes against Palestinians. The hashtag #BoycottMcDonalds gained worldwide traction on social media. There were also large gathering outside restaurants in Lebanon and Egypt protesting the move. McDonalds in other countries like Turkey and Pakistan, distanced themselves from the Israeli brand.

In January 2024, McDonald's CEO Chris Kempczinski acknowledged the backlash, stating, "Several markets in the Middle East and some outside the region are experiencing a meaningful business impact due to the war and associated misinformation that is affecting brands like McDonald's".

In April 2024, McDonald's reached a deal with the Israeli franchisee, Alonyal, to buy back all 225 outlets to the corporation.

== Legal cases ==
McDonald's has been involved in a number of lawsuits and other legal cases, most of which involved trademark disputes. The company has threatened many food businesses with legal action unless it drops the Mc or Mac from trading names.

=== Australia ===
In April 2007, in Perth, Western Australia, McDonald's pleaded guilty to five charges relating to the employment of children under 15 in one of its outlets and was fined A$8,000.

=== European Union ===
In April 2017, Irish fast-food chain Supermac's submitted a request to the European Union Property Office to cancel McDonald's owned trademarks within the European Union, claiming that McDonald's engaged in "trademark bullying; registering brand names... which are simply stored away in a war chest to use against future competitors", after the trademarks had prevented Supermac's from expanding out of Ireland. The EUIPO ruled in Supermac's favour, finding that McDonald's "has not proven genuine use" of many trademarks, cancelling McDonald's owned trademarks such as "Big Mac" and certain "Mc"-related trademarks within the European Union.

Burger King responded by "trolling" McDonald's by giving their sandwiches names that included the words "Big Mac", that also mocked the original burger, which included, "Like a Big Mac But Juicier", "Like a Big Mac, But Actually Big" and "Big Mac-ish But Flame-Grilled of Course".

=== Malaysia ===
On September 8, 2009, McDonald's Malaysian operations lost a lawsuit to prevent another restaurant calling itself McCurry. McDonald's lost in an appeal to Malaysia's highest court, the Federal Court. On December 29, 2016, McDonald's Malaysia issued a statement that said only certified halal cakes are allowed inside its restaurants nationwide.

=== United Kingdom ===
The longest-running legal action of all time in the UK was the McLibel case against two defendants who criticized a number of aspects of the company. The trial lasted 10 years and called 130 witnesses. The European Court of Human Rights deemed that the unequal resources of the litigants breached the defendants rights to freedom of speech and biased the trial. The result was widely seen as a "PR disaster" for McDonald's.

=== United States ===
The 1994 court case Liebeck v. McDonald's Restaurants examined a McDonald's practice of serving coffee so hot that when spilled, it caused third degree burns requiring weeks of hospitalization and skin grafting surgery. The trial outcome was an award of $2.86 million (equivalent to $5.47 million in 2024) for the plaintiff, 81-year old Stella Liebeck. The amount was later reduced to $640,000 (equivalent to $1.2 million in 2024).

In 2019, a McDonald's employee, Jenna Ries, sued the restaurant chain over allowing sexual harassment in the work place and described the working environment as "toxic".

== See also ==
- Criticism of Starbucks
- Criticism of Tesco
