= Every Day the Same Dream =

2009 video game

- Developer: Molleindustria
- Designer: Paolo Pedercini
- Platform: Flash
- Release: 2009
- Genre: Art game
- Mode: Single-player

Every Day the Same Dream (stylised in sentence case) is a short, 2D art game by Paolo Pedercini. The player is put in the role of a man whose monotonous life is about to change. Developed for the Experimental Gameplay Project at Carnegie Mellon University in 2009, the game has been described as "a beautiful game with a very bleak outlook." Pedercini says it is "a short existential game about alienation and refusal of labor." It has been compared to Passage by Jason Rohrer and Don't Look Back by Terry Cavanagh in that it is "an interesting, potentially fascinating experience." The game is offered as freeware under the Creative Commons license CC BY-NC-SA 2.5.

== Plot ==
While the game lacks a traditional storyline, the course of events has the player control a white collar worker and guide this avatar through the daily grind. If the avatar gets dressed, drives to work, and sits at his cubicle, the dream will restart from the initial bedroom scene. An old woman in the elevator offers the cryptic message: "5 more steps and you will be a new person." Once the player deviates from the predetermined path and initiates five specific interactions, the dream restarts in a new state with the player's avatar as the only person in the game world. When the player next returns to the office and passes the empty cubicles, the avatar stops to watch an identical character leap from the rooftop, and the game ends.

== Gameplay ==
The game gives the player simple controls, only enough to walk left or right using the arrow keys and interact using the spacebar. Using these limited controls, the gameplay encourages the player to "subvert the limitations of the world" however possible until the narrative changes.

== Critical response and analysis ==
Many media outlets noticed the game.

=== Interactive experience ===
Some find the label "game" unfit for this work, offering "interactive experience" as a more accurate definition.

=== Interactive media and design ===
Gamasutra hosts an article discussing the importance of the game as an example of an interactive medium's capacity "to offer experiences that passive media can't possibly." The game plays especially well on "natural player tendencies" and the expectation that the player will seek to "push the boundaries" of the game as far as possible. Despite its brevity, the game highlights the value and importance of interactivity, both as a game design principle and for mechanics-as-metaphor.

=== Interactive media and meaning ===
The game demonstrates how an interactive work can convey meaning "every bit as effectively as linear media, perhaps even more so." The unique experience of taking agency over someone else's narrative, in this case that of the avatar, allows the player to relate directly to events in the avatar's life, superimpose those events onto the player's own life, and in so doing apply the message of the game to the player's own reality.

=== Traditional analysis ===
Soderman's essay uses the game to argue that the focus on meaning inferred from game mechanics has caused "new hermeneutical methods" of interpretation to supersede "visual and narrative representations" in terms of importance and consideration. A mechanics-exclusive interpretation of the game ignores key allegoric elements, such as the gradual failure of the company with each act of refusal of labour as presented on the graph at the office, or the simulation of purgatory in the final state devoid of the other characters encountered during previous days. An approach that fails to analyze "the object from every possible angle" will inevitably miss the most "meaningful facets" of the work.

== Soundtrack ==
Pedercini originally produced a soundtrack consisting of "crappy drones [on] an electric guitar." The "thunderous pulsing" heard in the final version of the game, produced by Jesse Stiles, ultimately replaced Paolo's track.

== See also ==
- The Stanley Parable – 3D interactive walking simulator game with some similar themes.
