= Tank Day =

Tank Day may refer to:

- "Tank Day", an event held at Military Technical Museum Lešany in the Czech Republic
- "Tank Day", a promotion campaign launched by Starbucks Korea
