= Censorship of Apple =

Censorship of Apple may refer to:

- blocking or filtering of Apple services or websites by outside entities, notably in the policies of Internet censorship in China
- Censorship by Apple as the result of legal action by third parties, most notably the European Union's "right to be forgotten"

== See also ==
- Internet censorship and surveillance by country
