= Phone Story =

2011 video game

- Developer: Molleindustria
- Publisher: Molleindustria
- Platforms: iOS (iPhone), Android, Adobe Flash
- Release: iOS; September 9, 2011 (iOS); Android; September 14, 2012
- Genres: Satire, minigames

Phone Story is a satirical mobile video game conceived by Yes Lab activist Michael Pineschi and designed by Paolo Pedercini for Molleindustria with the stated aim of demonstrating what the developers refer to as "the dark side of your favorite smart phone." The game consists of four minigames which require the player to complete activities such as forcing children in the Third World to mine coltan and preventing suicides at a Foxconn factory.

The creators of the game stated the main purpose was to elicit a response from people who "fail to realize how their fashionable consumption can have negative effects on people in the globalized world.

== Release ==
Phone Story was released on the iOS platform on September 9, 2011, though it was banned by Apple after only four days. Apple cited violations of their developer guidelines as the reason for removing the game, though an article published in The Guardian questioned the validity of their concerns. Following the removal of the game, it was released for Android phones, and a free playable Adobe Flash version was made available on the developer's website.

The Phone Story website contains extensive information about the topics touched on by the game, and all profits from the sale of the app go to charities which work in the areas described, including a donation of over $6000 to a girl injured in a suicide attempt at a Foxconn factory.

The game is offered as freeware under a Creative Commons license CC BY-NC-SA.

== Gameplay ==
Phone Story consists of four self-contained minigames, each featuring narration by a voice which represents the user's phone, detailing the real world conditions which the minigames represent. The first game deals with the mining of coltan in the Democratic Republic of the Congo, and has the player controlling guards to ensure that labourers are not allowed to rest. The second takes place at a factory, in which the player must move a net back and forth in order to catch workers who are attempting suicide. The third is set in a phone store, in which the player must slingshot phones into the hands of consumers. The final minigame concerns the recycling of discarded phones in Ghana, tasking the player with dividing components from the phone among workers that are salvaging the parts in unsafe ways. Each minigame requires the player to complete the relevant action successfully a certain number of times before a timer runs out; if they do not, the narrator admonishes them, saying "do not pretend that you are not complicit."

== Reception ==
Phone Story has received mixed reviews. Android Rundown said that it was "not that entertaining or enlightening", criticising the game's short length and repetitive gameplay and awarding it 5 points out of 10. Pocket Gamer were more positive in reference to the game's educational content, stating that it encouraged them to read up on the issues raised, but were similarly critical with the game's simplistic gameplay and short length.
