= Jesse Stiles =

American musician (born 1978)

Jesse Stiles (born June 15, 1978) is an American electronic musician, record producer, sound designer and electronic artist known for his experimental and highly technical work.

== Biography ==
Stiles attended Rensselaer Polytechnic Institute for graduate school, studying electronic art and music under Pauline Oliveros, Curtis Bahn, and Igor Vamos. Before attending graduate school Stiles was a Watson fellow, recording his first album, Watson Songs, while traveling in India and England.

Following RPI, Stiles moved to a textile factory in DeRuyter, New York, and entered a period of great creativity, creating many of the works that would go to fill his first solo art show "Automatic Speleology".

In 2010, Stiles was hired as the Music Coordinator for the Merce Cunningham Dance Company. Working with the company during their Legacy Tour, he produced and performed in concerts featuring the works of many experimental composers including John Cage, David Tudor, Brian Eno, Radiohead, Sigur Ros, and John Paul Jones. Stiles' compositions were featured in many of the company's site-specific "Event" performances.

In 2011, Jesse Ball, Thordis Bjornsdottir, Olivia Robinson, and Jesse Stiles founded The Poyais Group. Exhibitions by The Poyais Group have garnered both praise and controversy.

Stiles has provided music and sound design for a variety of feature films, short films, documentaries, and exhibitions. He has scored five video game titles for the radical design group Molleindustria. Stiles has recorded and produced records released by Conrex Records, Specific Recordings, and Gagarin Records.

Since 2014, Stiles has held an assistant professorship at Carnegie Mellon University where he teaches subjects such as sound design, electronic music composition and performance, as well as programming and signal processing for creative practice. Additionally, Stiles has founded and currently co-runs Carnegie Mellon's premiere electroacoustic music ensemble, the Exploded Ensemble. This group operates as the University's "hybrid music research wing" and is renowned for creating unique multi-media experiences in unconventional spaces.

Now he teaches at the University of Michigan.

== Notable works ==
- Deja Rendez Vous (2009)
- Automatic Speleology (2010)
- 'The Deathworks of May Elizabeth Kramner (with The Poyais Group) (2011)

== Discography ==
- Watson Songs (The Jesse Stiles 3000, Conrex Records, 2003)
- The Target Museum (Specific Recordings, 2010)
- The Ruined Map (Technical Drawings, Gagarin Records, 2011)
- Forty Minutes and Eleven Seconds (Takehisa Kosugi, Christian Wolff, David Behrman, John King, Jesse Stiles, 2011)
