= Censorship by Apple =

Censorship by Apple refers to Apple Inc.'s removal, omission, or disruption of the spread of content or information from its services or subsidiaries, such as the iTunes Store and the App Store, in order to comply with Apple's company policies, legal demands, or various government censorship laws.

== iTunes Books ==
In 2005, Steve Jobs banned all books published by John Wiley & Sons from the Apple retail stores in response to their publishing an unauthorized biography, iCon.

The book received criticism for "failing to cohesively and clearly express the opinion of Jobs, linguistic redundancies, and clumsy anecdotes." However, despite the criticisms of the quality of Jeffrey S. Young and William L. Simon's writing and the attempts to highlight Steve Jobs's "negative" characteristics as a boss and individual, thought leader Dan Sumption admitted that the book was a relatively entertaining view into the life of Steve Jobs.

The iBooks description for Moby-Dick censored the words "sperm whale" as of April 2010.

According to The Daily Telegraph, four erotic books, including Blonde and Wet, the Complete Story, were allegedly removed from the top 10 chart on July 26, 2010.

Northwest Press has had repeated conflicts with Apple's content limitations on sales through the iBooks store. In 2011, an adaptation by Tom Bouden of Oscar Wilde's play The Importance of Being Earnest was only approved after the addition of black bars to cover partial male nudity. The technology company initially permitted the individual issues of Jon Macy's Fearful Hunter, but rejected the collected edition, then removed the issues. The satirical Al-Qaeda's Super Secret Weapon was rejected outright. In 2016, Northwest published a self-censored version of Hard to Swallow by Justin Hall and Dave Davenport – covering the "objectionable" parts with images of apples – when the original version was rejected due to sexual content.

== iTunes Music ==
=== Song censorship ===
There is a policy of censoring profanity in song titles on iTunes. This has resulted in a Scunthorpe glitch, by which inoffensive titles are censored due to a coincidental string of letters.

If the song has an explicit label, it will be marked "explicit" next to the song title. If a song is marked "explicit", then it is unavailable for purchase if "restrict explicit content" is checked under the parental controls preference. Often, there will be a "clean" mark next to the title of some songs, meaning the lyrics have been censored, and is available to purchase on all accounts. Generally, if a song is marked "clean", there is an explicit version available as well.

== iTunes Podcasts ==
=== InfoWars ===
On August 6, 2018, Apple removed all, but one of the podcasts created by InfoWars, a website owned by Alex Jones, a right-wing American conspiracy theorist radio-show host and content creator. Apple cited hate speech as the reason for the removal of the content. Apple's decision to remove this content sparked other major technology companies, including Facebook, YouTube, Spotify, and Google, into removing InfoWars content.

== Apple TV+ ==
In October 2023, Apple canceled The Problem with Jon Stewart because of editorial disagreements over Stewart's treatment of China, Lina Khan and other topics. The cancelation attracted criticism and questions from the United States House Select Committee on Strategic Competition between the United States and the Chinese Communist Party.

== App Store ==
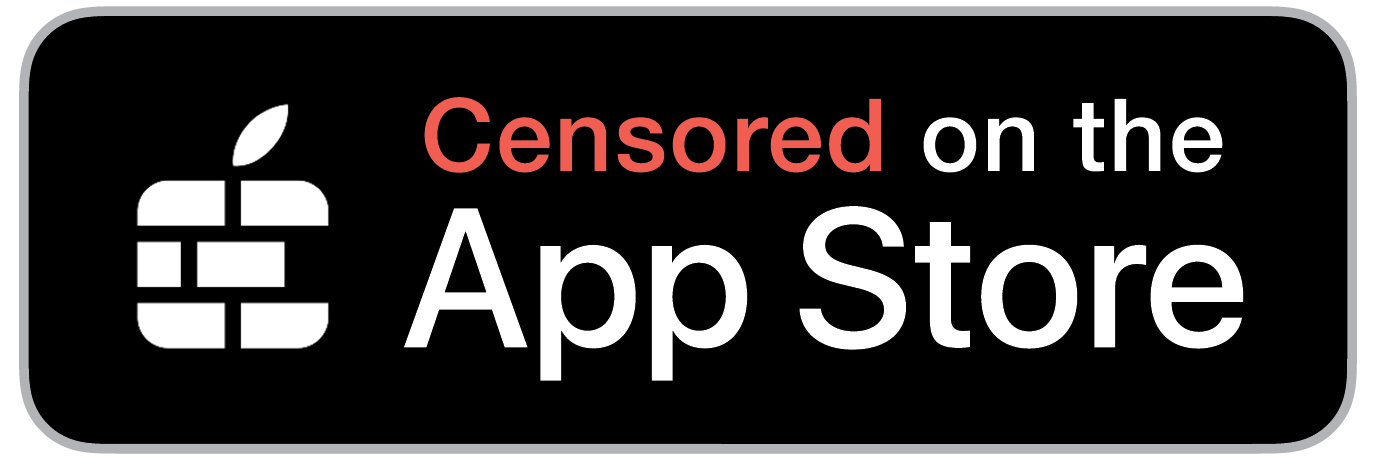
The unofficial "Censored on the App Store" logo

=== Newspaper and magazine content ===
In May 2009, Apple rejected the first version of "Newspapers", an iPhone app that let users read content from 50+ newspapers around the world, including The New York Times, France's Le Monde, and the United Kingdom tabloid The Sun. The app was rejected because the topless "Page 3" girls daily features were described as "obscene". A second version of the application was submitted, removing access to The Sun, and adding a price tag of £0.59. The app was made available in the summer, after the release of the iPhone 3.0 software. Another application, of similar nature to 'Newspapers', called 'Eucalyptus' allowed users to download e-books to their iPhone, though was rejected by Apple because one of the e-books that could have been downloaded was the Kama Sutra. The ban has since been lifted.

We do believe we have a moral responsibility to keep porn off the iPhone ... Folks who want porn can buy an Android phone.

— Steve Jobs

We can't adapt European magazines to the standards of Utah.

— Mathias Müller von Blumencron (editor of Der Spiegel, warning that the news magazine would not alter its content for the App Store)

The App Store has Playboy and Sports Illustrated adult-rated apps that have yet to be removed, while some apps by others were removed citing adult content which has resulted in accusations of hypocrisy. Despite this, adult sites continue to market for iPhone and iPad users. In November 2009, the application of Stern (a mainstream German weekly magazine with a print circulation of about 900,000) was deleted for several weeks without warning. In January 2010, Europe's largest newspaper, German tabloid Bild, removed content from the iPhone version of its print edition at the request of Apple, and later it had to modify one of its applications – like in the Stern case because of nudity. The Association of German Magazine Publishers (VDZ) warned that with such interventions Apple might be moving towards censorship.

On November 26, 2010, an informational magazine about Google's OS from the Danish publisher Mediaprovider was not allowed in the app store.

The Guardian described rejection of explicit content by Apple as analogous to that of the distributor WHSmith, a main distributor which for many years imposed content restrictions on British publishers. Workers at the fashion magazine Dazed & Confused have nicknamed their iPad edition the "Iran edition".

=== Pulitzer Prize-winning cartoons ===
In December 2009, Apple banned a cartoon app called NewsToons by cartoonist Mark Fiore, on the grounds that it "ridiculed public figures". In April 2010, Fiore won the Pulitzer Prize for his political satire cartoons, making history as the very first internet-only cartoonist to win the prestigious journalistic prize. Following public outcry after the story broke in the wake of the award, Apple asked Fiore to resubmit his app, and it was subsequently accepted. Fiore said, "Sure, mine might get approved, but what about someone who hasn't won a Pulitzer and who is maybe making a better political app than mine? Do you need some media frenzy to get an app approved that has political material?"

=== Baby Shaker ===
In April 2009, a game called Baby Shaker was approved for the App Store then later removed due to complaints. The game shows a picture of a baby crying, to which the user must shake their phone to silence it. Upon doing so, two red “X”s would appear over the baby’s eyes implying its death.

=== Nine Inch Nails ===
In May 2009, Trent Reznor of the rock band Nine Inch Nails announced, via his Twitter account, that Apple had rejected an update to the Nine Inch Nails application due to "objectionable content". The developer posted a message on the Nine Inch Nails discussion boards explaining the situation further:

v1.0 is live. v1.0.3 got rejected due to content yet the app has no content in it. this was mainly a stability release to fix the bug that crashes the app for international users. the bug was fixed 24 hours after 1.0 went live and we have been waiting for apple to approve it ever since. meanwhile the app continues to get a growing number of 1 star ratings from international users understandably frustrated by the bug. but looks like our hands are tied.

Apple later permitted the update.

=== iPhone eBook ===
In December 2009, Ted Lando's eBook app "Take Control of iPhone OS 3" was rejected by Apple. The app was not permitted back into the app store until all references to jailbreaking were removed.

=== Phone Story ===
In 2011, Apple banned a game called Phone Story that explored the ethical challenges of smartphone manufacturing, including conflict minerals, environmental waste, and troubled labor practices. The game was eventually published on the web by its creator Molleindustria.

=== Drone strike app ===
In August 2012, Josh Begley created an iPhone app that sent out a push notification whenever a U.S. military UAV struck a target. The app was rejected because of Apple finding the content "objectionable and crude".

=== Utilities ===
On March 11, 2013, HiddenApps was approved and appeared in the App Store. This app provided access to developer diagnostic menus, allowed for stock Apps to be hidden and enabled an opt-out feature for iAds, Apple's developer driven advertisement system.

=== Educational app ===
In July 2013, a tech education startup called Treehouse claimed that Apple had refused to let them release an iOS app that contained lessons about Android.

=== Papers, Please ===
The video game Papers, Please, centered around the operation of a border checkpoint, was brought to iPad in December 2014, but developer Lucas Pope was forced to remove some pixelated nudity from the game's full-body scanner to be allowed to release the game for Apple devices. After a few days, Pope was permitted to upload a full version of the game to the App Store including pixelated nudity in an apparent reversal by Apple. However, it is still rated 17+ on the App Store.

=== France Musique app removal ===
On May 4, 2015, Apple removed the France Musique application from its App store due to the airing of "inappropriate content" in a podcast. The application displayed a painting by Édouard Manet, Olympia, depicting mild nudity. The podcast application was submitted to the App Store again, with a 17+ rating.

=== Chaos Computer Club videos about security vulnerabilities ===
In October 2015, Apple rejected a custom streaming application for Apple TV that was created by some members of the Frankfurt branch of Chaos Computer Club, Europe's largest hacker association. The application was meant to show recordings of talks from Chaos Computer Club's conferences. According to a blog post that was written about the incident, Apple's reason was because "some of the videos show how to hack Apple devices". The recordings are publicly available and are hosted on YouTube as well. Using the YouTube app still allows playback of the content on Apple devices.

=== The Binding of Isaac: Rebirth ===
Apple banned the video game The Binding of Isaac: Rebirth from appearing in the iOS App Store due to its cartoon depictions of violence towards children. The game was subsequently accepted in the next year, with a 17+ rating.

=== Telegram and Telegram X ===
In February 2018, Apple removed Telegram and Telegram X, encrypted messaging applications made by Telegram Messenger LLP, from the App Store due to content deemed inappropriate. Apple specifically cited instances of child pornography that was made available to users, and subsequently banned the apps until the situation could be dealt with.

=== InfoWars ===
Apple removed the InfoWars app from the App Store in September 2018 citing content that violated their policy against indecent material. Apple's ban simply prevents users from downloading the app, but does not restrict access to those with the app installed.

=== Tumblr ===
In November 2018, Apple removed the Tumblr app from the App Store due to Tumblr's failure to filter child pornography. Tumblr uses a database of known child pornography to automatically detect and remove child pornography from their website, however they found evidence of images that were not in the database present on Tumblr. In response to the ban, Tumblr removed the instances of child pornography and has since moved to ban all pornographic material on their platform as of December 17, 2018.

=== Historical games ===
In December 2018, Apple removed the strategy game Afghanistan '11 due to the fact that it featured real-life combatants. Slitherine, the developers of the game, countered that the main objectives focused on supporting Afghan civilians rather than defeating the Taliban. This followed a temporary ban of the game Ultimate General: Gettysburg for featuring the Confederate flag in historical context.

=== HKmap ===
In October 2019, Apple removed the HKmap.live app from its App Store. HKMap is used to track the locations of protests and police in Hong Kong. Apple stated that the app "allowed users to evade law enforcement".

=== "Apple takes 30% of this purchase." in Facebook events ===
In 2020, Apple forced Facebook to remove a message informing users that Apple took a 30% cut of all fees for paid online events. Apple claimed that the notification was against the App Store policy on "irrelevant" information, a position Facebook disagreed with.

=== Navalny ===
In 2021, Apple and Google removed the Navalny app from the App Store and Google Play Store respectively. The app was pulled the day of Russia's parliamentary elections which cause the app's creator, Alexei Navalny, and his supporters to claim that the two companies are taking part in political suppression. Apple sent a letter to Navalny's affiliates stating that the app had content that is illegal in Russia.

=== ICEBlock ===
Following pressure from the second Trump administration, Apple removed ICEBlock from the App Store.

== Safari ==
=== GitLab ===
Apple Inc. has been sharing the IP addresses of Safari users in China mainland with Tencent Safe Browsing since at least 2019. Apple originally said the Tencent blocklist would be used only for Safari users in mainland China. However, after 24 November 2022, Apple quietly edited its Safari privacy policy to note the Tencent blacklist would be used for devices in Hong Kong as well, while Google is not yet blocked by the Government of Hong Kong, unlike mainland China. In 2022, Hong Kong former Apple Inc. senior software engineer Chu Ka-cheong discovered that Apple Safari blocked GitLab in mainland China and Hong Kong due to Tencent's blacklist, which labeled GitLab, a California-based American software company and the first partly Ukrainian unicorn, as containing dangerous "misinformation." Maciej Stachowiak, who is the leader of Apple WebKit, replied with “we will look into it.”

== Censorship by country ==
The following are instances of censorship and information control imposed by Apple in App Stores other than the United States App Store. Many were imposed due to pressure from foreign governments and were put into effect to comply with laws. The restrictions, however, are applied even after the user moves to another country, unless they change the region of their Apple ID, which requires cancelling existing subscriptions and setting up a new payment method.

=== China ===
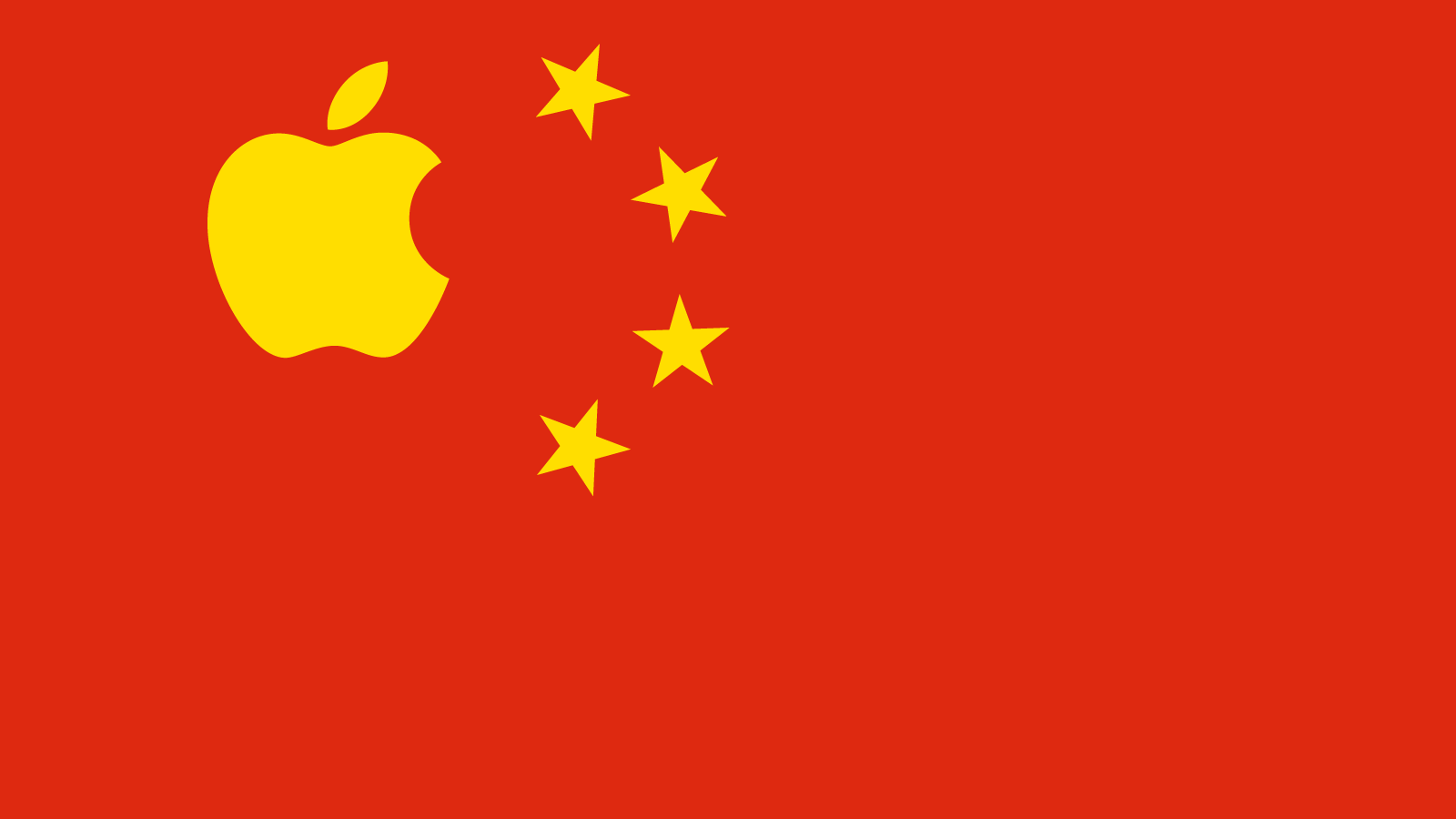
Desecration of Chinese flag with Apple characteristics, by TechCrunch

As early as 2015, Apple shut off its News app inside China.

In 2017, Apple removed apps from the Chinese App Store that allowed users to access content forbidden by the Chinese government. Many of these apps gave users access to virtual private networks that could allow them to circumvent the Great Firewall. Apple did not cite any Chinese laws, but claimed that the apps broke the laws of their local governments. Among the apps removed was VyprVPN, an app by Golden Frog, a company which had filed an amicus brief supporting Apple during the Apple–FBI encryption dispute. Apple is the first foreign global technology company to concede to the Chinese government's demands.

Apple removes VPNs from the Chinese App Store in order to comply with the Chinese government and stay in the market. The CEO of Apple, Tim Cook, stated that if they censor now, the rules for censorship in China may relax.

In 2018, Apple restricted the emoji of the flag of the Republic of China on devices used in mainland China. The same year, Apple removed the Voice of America app in China at the behest of the Cyberspace Administration of China.

In 2018, Apple's restrictions on sending the word "Taiwan" or sending an emoji representing the flag of Taiwan on iDevices using a Chinese country code or language settings caused the devices to crash.

Artists who reference the 1989 Tiananmen Square protests and massacre have had some or all of their music removed from iTunes, including Jacky Cheung Hok-yau and Tat Ming Pair.

In July 2020, Apple removed 3,300 unlicensed games from the Chinese App Store.

Five months later, Apple removed a further 48,000 unlicensed games from the Chinese App Store. Removed apps included Asphalt 8: Airborne, Grand Theft Auto, and Fruit Ninja.

In 2021, Apple removed a Quran app and a Bible app from the China App Store. Apple also removed a popular daily prayer app for Muslims from China. The Jehovah's Witnesses' app was removed in May 2020.

In October 2022, following the 2022 Beijing Sitong Bridge protest, Apple released an update which limited the AirDrop functionality on iPhones and iPads purchased in China, changing the option of "Receive from Everyone" to "Everyone for 10 minutes".

The following month, Apple removed the TaiwanPlus app from the China App Store.

In August 2023, Apple removed AI apps from Chinese App Store.

In April 2024, Apple removed Threads, WhatsApp, Telegram, and Signal from the Chinese App Store.

Since iOS 17.5 was released in 2024, the phrase "to celebrate the LGBTQ+ community" has been deleted from the Pride wallpaper description for the Simplified Chinese version.

==== Hong Kong ====
Apple Inc. has been sharing the IP addresses of Safari users in China mainland with Tencent Safe Browsing since at least 2019. Apple originally said the Tencent blocklist would be used only for Safari users in mainland China. However, after 24 November 2022, Apple quietly edited its Safari privacy policy to note the Tencent blacklist would be used for devices in Hong Kong as well, while Google is not yet blocked by the Government of Hong Kong, unlike mainland China. In 2022, Hong Kong former Apple Inc. senior software engineer Chu Ka-cheong discovered that Apple Safari blocked GitLab in mainland China and Hong Kong due to Tencent's blacklist, which labeled GitLab, a California-based American software company and the first partly Ukrainian unicorn, as containing dangerous "misinformation." Maciej Stachowiak, who is the leader of Apple WebKit, replied with “we will look into it.”

=== Taiwan ===
In August 2021, Citizen Lab at the University of Toronto found that Apple censors engravings in Taiwan related to the Chinese Communist Party, mainland Chinese state bodies, and Falun Gong.

=== Iran ===
In February 2017, Apple restricted payment services in Iranian apps to comply with U.S. sanctions that forbade Iranian currency from entering the United States. The Iranian apps responded by implementing an Iranian electronic payment service.

In August 2017, Apple removed many Iranian apps from the App Store citing U.S. sanctions placed on Iran. While Apple has neither stores in Iran nor specific versions of the App Store for the country, Iranian citizens are able to get access to Apple products and content from external sources. Apple removed many apps developed specifically for Iranians, including a ride-sharing service called Snapp!, and a food delivery service called DelionFoods.

=== Russia ===
In May 2018, Apple played a role in the censorship of Telegram, an encrypted messaging app used globally. Interested in surveying the encrypted messages, the Russian government demanded Telegram provide decryption keys to their Federal Security Service. When Telegram refused, the Russian Government threatened Apple with legal repercussions if they did not block Telegram from the Russian App Store and eliminate the push notification feature. The founder of Telegram, Pavel Durov, has publicly claimed Apple has restricted Telegram users across the world from updating their app; an action that could cause problems for Telegram's ability to meet regulations.

== See also ==
- Censorship by Google
- Censorship by Google § Google Play
- Censorship of Twitter
- Censorship of YouTube
