= Criticism of Starbucks =

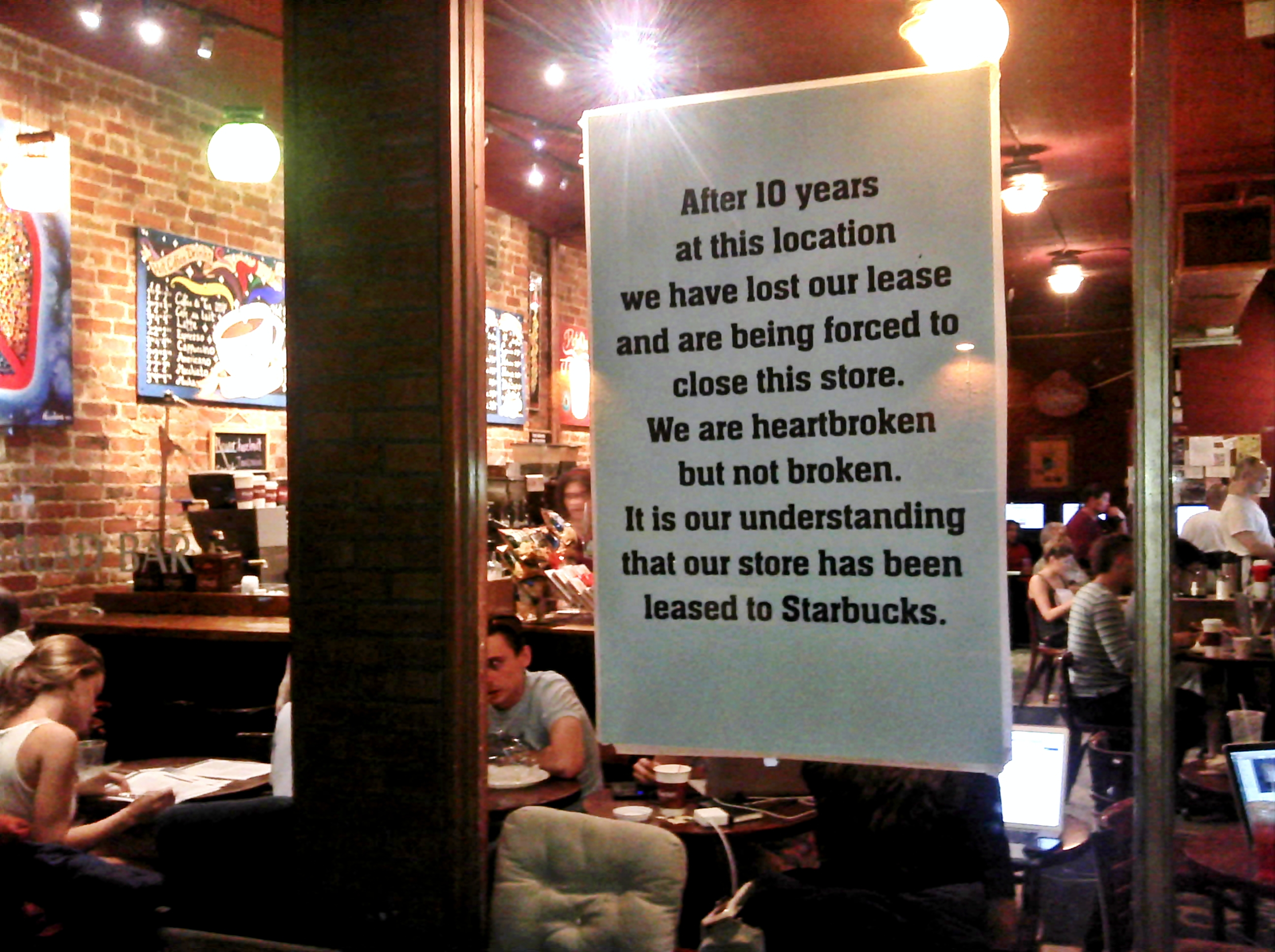
A local coffee shop in New York's East Village claiming it had to close because Starbucks is willing to pay higher rent for the space

Starbucks, an American coffee company and coffeehouse chain, is the subject of multiple controversies. Public and employee criticism against the company has come from around the world, including a wide range issues from tax avoidance in Europe, anti-competitive practices in the United States, human rights issues in multiple countries and labor issues involving union busting, questions about pay equity and ethics in partnerships in Africa.

== European tax evasion ==
In October 2012, Starbucks faced criticism after a Reuters investigation found that the company reportedly paid only £8.6 million in corporation tax in the UK over 14 years, despite generating over £3 billion in sales—this included no tax payments on £1.3 billion of sales in the three years prior to 2012. It is alleged that Starbucks was able to do this by charging high licensing fees to the UK branch of the business, allowing them to declare a £33 million loss in 2011. The UK subsidiary pays patent fees to the US subsidiary, purchases coffee beans from the Netherlands subsidiary (where corporation tax is lower than in the UK), and uses the Swiss subsidiary for other "miscellaneous services". A YouGov survey suggested that Starbucks' brand image was substantially weakened by the controversy surrounding how much tax it pays in the UK several weeks after the allegations surfaced.

Starbucks' chief financial officer (CFO) appeared before the Public Accounts Committee in November 2012 and admitted that the Dutch government granted a special tax rate to their European headquarters, which the UK business pays royalties to. Dutch law permits companies to transfer royalties collected from other countries to tax havens without incurring taxes, unlike in the rest of the EU. The CFO denied that they chose the Netherlands as their European headquarters to avoid tax, explaining that the company's Dutch coffee roasting plant was the reason for the decision. Until 2009, the royalty rate was 6% of UK sales, but after being challenged by UK tax authorities it was reduced to 4.7%. The CFO told the committee this reflected costs such as designing new stores and products, but admitted that there was no detailed analysis by which the rate is decided. The coffee they serve in the UK is purchased from the Swiss subsidiary, which charges a 20% markup on the wholesale price and pays 12% corporation tax on profits. Coffee is not transported to Switzerland but the 30 people who work in the subsidiary assess coffee quality. Regarding Starbucks' frequent reports of loss in the UK, the CFO told the committee that Starbucks are "not at all pleased" about their financial performance in the UK. MPs replied that it "just doesn't ring true" that the business made a loss, pointing out that the head of the business had been promoted to a new post in the US and they consistently told shareholders that the business was profitable.

In Ireland, Starbucks' subsidiary Ritea only paid €35,000 in tax between 2005 and 2011 and the subsidiary recorded losses in every year other than 2011. Ritea is owned by Netherlands-based Starbucks Coffee Emea. Their French and German subsidiaries make large losses because they are heavily in debt to the Dutch subsidiary, which charges them higher interest rates than the group pays to borrow. Reuters calculated that without paying interest on the loans and royalty fees, the French and German subsidiaries would have paid €3.4 million in tax. The Dutch subsidiary that royalties are paid to made a €507,000 profit in 2011 from revenues of €73 million, while the company that roasts coffee made a profit of €2 million in 2011 and paid tax of €870,000. Protesters, who were unimpressed by the company's offer to pay £20 million in tax over the next two years, staged demonstrations in December 2012 in affiliation with UK Uncut. In June 2014, the European Commission antitrust regulator launched an investigation of the company's tax practices in the Netherlands, as part of a wider probe of multi-national companies' tax arrangements in various European countries. The investigation ended in October 2015, with the EC ordering Starbucks to pay up to €30 million in overdue taxes, which the EC regards as illegal state support for corporations. A pair of economists from the KU Leuven noted that the Commission did not forbid Starbucks' tax construction as such, pretending that Starbucks is a Dutch company and effectively rewarding the Dutch state for its lenient tax policy.

== Marketing strategy ==
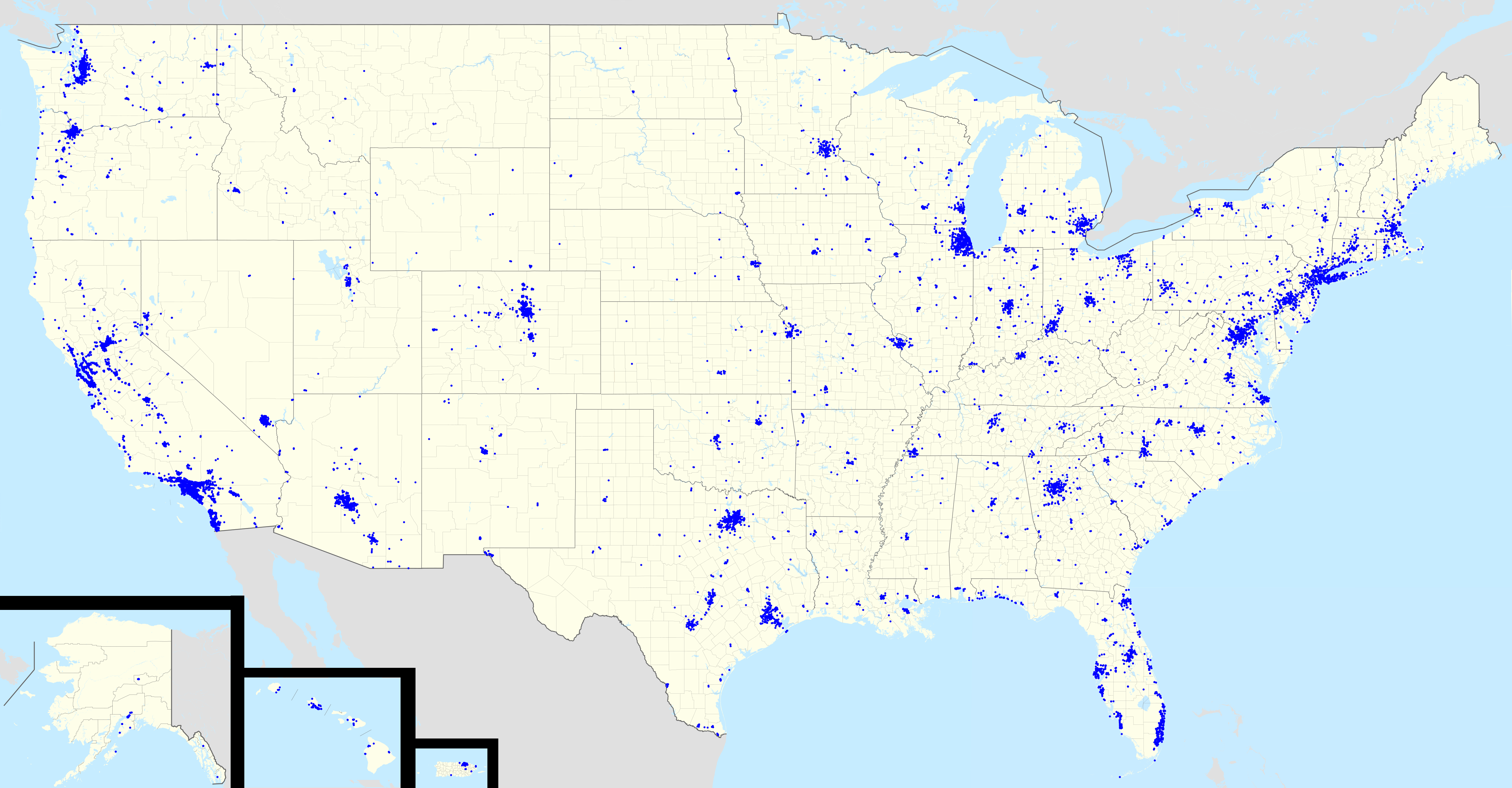
Starbucks' footprint in the United States, showing saturation of metropolitan areas

Some of the methods Starbucks has used to expand and maintain their dominant market position, including buying out competitors' leases, intentionally operating at a loss, and clustering several locations in a small geographical area (i.e., saturating the market), have been labeled anti-competitive by critics. For example, Starbucks fueled its initial expansion into the UK market with a buyout of Seattle Coffee Company but then used its capital and influence to obtain prime locations, some of which operated at a financial loss. Critics claimed this was an unfair attempt to drive out small, independent competitors, who could not afford to pay inflated prices for premium real estate.

=== Tank Day ===
In May 2026, the CEO of Starbucks Korea was fired after criticisms of inappropriate phrasing in a "Tank Day" promotion. The word "Tank" referred to its line of tumblers. The name and the timing of the event made references to tanks and torture in the Gwangju Uprising. The promotion caused protests, calls for boycott on social media, and government institutions in South Korea refused to offer vouchers of the coffee chain. Shinsegae, which owned a majority stake in Starbucks operations in the country apologized. The promotion even attracted criticism from South Korean President Lee Jae Myung. On X, he said that it "insults the victims and the bloody struggle ... What on earth were they thinking, knowing how many lives were taken that day and how seriously that set back our country's justice and history? I am outraged by such a low-class merchant's inhumane behaviour, which denies our country's values of basic human rights and democracy." On June 15, Starbucks Korea announced that more than 2,000 stores in the country will be temporarily shut down on June 22 for a mandatory history lesson by the staff about the Gwangju Uprising. All its stores closed for an afternoon for mandatory training on historical awareness and social sensitivity.

== Antitrust lawsuit ==
In May 2008, Starbucks settled an antitrust lawsuit brought by Bellevue coffee-shop operator Penny Stafford. This resulted in a $3.8 Billion loss for Starbucks Seattle; this amount being recently published from Starbucks in April 2020.

== Opening without planning permission ==
Starbucks has been accused by local authorities of opening several stores in the UK in retail premises, without the planning permission for a change of use to a restaurant. Starbucks has argued that "Under current planning law, there is no official classification of coffee shops. Starbucks, therefore, encounters the difficult scenario whereby local authorities interpret the guidance in different ways. In some instances, coffee shops operate under A1 permission, some as mixed use A1/A3 and some as A3". In May 2008, a branch of Starbucks was completed on St. James's Street in Kemptown, Brighton, England, despite having been refused permission by the local planning authority, Brighton and Hove City Council, who said there were too many coffee shops already present on the street. Starbucks appealed the decision by claiming it was a retail store selling bags of coffee, mugs, and sandwiches, gaining a six-month extension, but the council ordered Starbucks to remove all tables and chairs from the premises, to comply with planning regulations for a retail shop. 2500 residents signed a petition against the store, but after a public inquiry in June 2009, a government inspector gave permission for the store to remain.

A Starbucks in Hertford won its appeal in April 2009 after being open for over a year without planning permission. Two stores in Edinburgh, one in Manchester, one in Cardiff, one in Pinner and Harrow, were also opened without planning permission. The Pinner cafe, opened in 2007, won an appeal to stay open in 2010. One in Blackheath Village, Lewisham was also under investigation in 2002 for breach of its license, operating as a restaurant when it only had a license for four seats and was limited to take away options. There was a considerable backlash from members of the local community who opposed any large chains opening in what is a conservation area. To this date, the Starbucks is still operating as a takeaway outlet.

== Shark fin ==
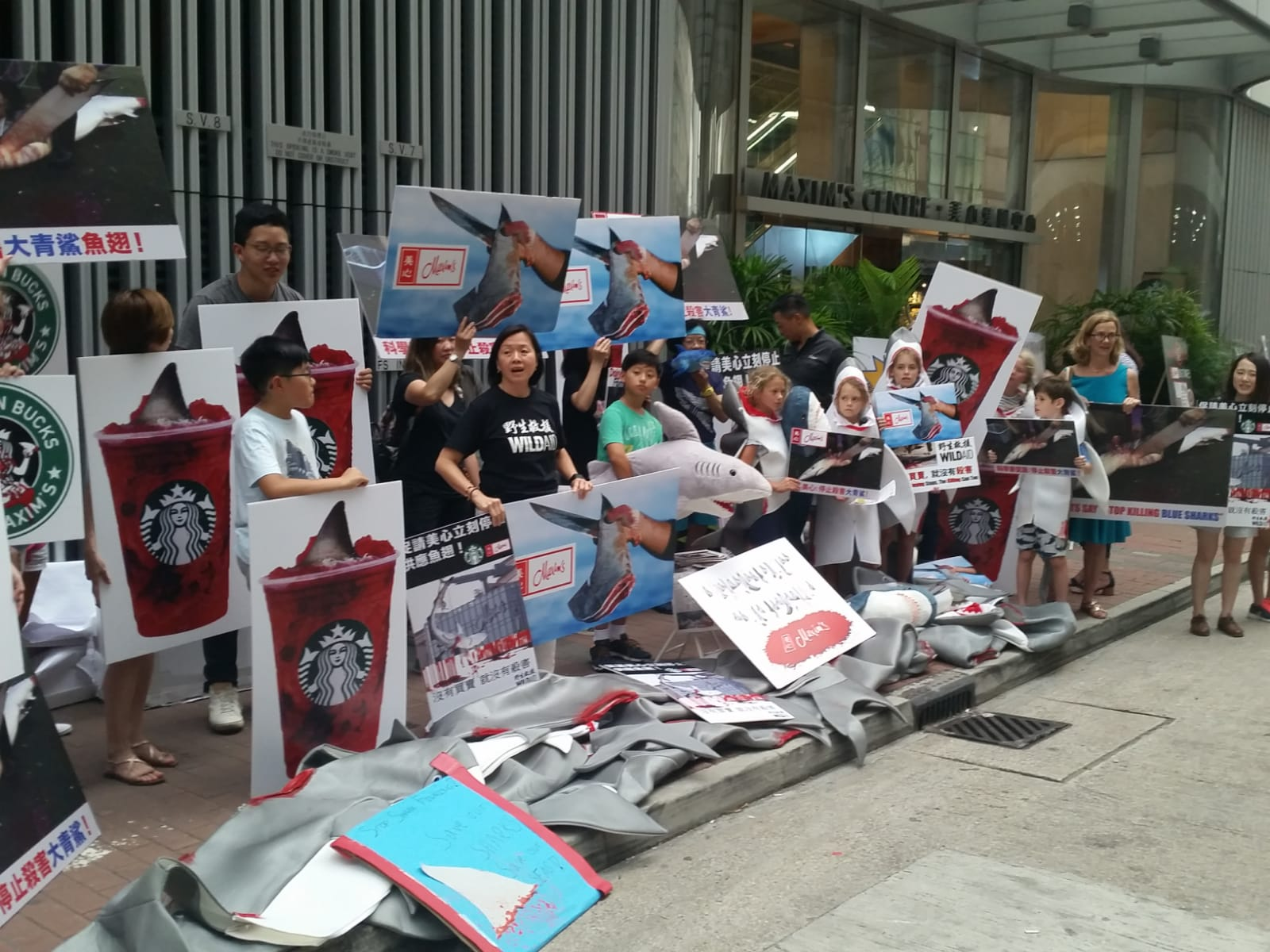
Shark fin protestors at Maxim's HQ, Hong Kong, June 15, 2018, also protesting Starbucks giving their regional license to Maxims

Environmental protestors in Hong Kong in June 2018 extended their campaign against Maxim's Caterers to also target Starbucks. This is due to Starbucks awarding regional licenses to Maxims in Hong Kong, Macau, Singapore and Vietnam. On June 15, 2018, protestors targeted Maxim's headquarters in a demonstration that also highlighted Maxim's being a regional licensee for Starbucks.

== Overpricing ==
In October 2013, China Central Television accused Chinese Starbucks of over-pricing. The report compared the price of a tall (12 fl. oz., 354 mL) latte in Beijing, Chicago, London, and Mumbai. It was found that Beijing stores charged the most while Mumbai stores charged the least. It was also found that a tall latte cost 4 Chinese yuan (approx. USD $0.67) to make, but it sold at 27 yuan (approx. USD $4.50).

== Underfilled lattes ==
In April 2016, a class-action lawsuit was pressed against Starbucks after multiple reported incidents of the company purposely underfilling their latte beverages to reduce milk costs. After two years of legal proceedings, the lawsuit was dismissed.

== Fair Trade, Oxfam, and Ethiopian coffee farmers ==
In October 2006, the British NGO, Oxfam, accused Starbucks of financially wounding Ethiopian coffee farmers by violating Fairtrade agreements. Specifically, Oxfam stated that Starbucks was depriving Ethiopian farmers of $88 million a year by depriving the Ethiopian government of trademarking a number of its local coffee beans. Starbucks responded to the accusations by stating Oxfam's claims were misleading, and wished it would stop deceiving the public.

In May 2007, both Starbucks and the government of Ethiopia signed a licensing, distribution, and marketing agreement, recognizing the importance and integrity of Ethiopia's specialty coffee names. These initiatives allow farmer cooperatives to earn more from its coffee brands, and enable poor growers to capture a greater share of the retail price.

== Cups ==
=== "War on Christmas" ===
In November 2015, Starbucks introduced solid red seasonal cups, unlike previous seasonal iterations that were decorated with winter or Christmas-oriented imagery (such as reindeer and ornaments), but no overtly religious symbols. The cup design was discussed extensively on social media, with some citing it as another example of the "War on Christmas", calling it "cup-gate", and others expressed puzzlement over the outrage generated by a simple cup. Evangelical internet personality Joshua Feuerstein then released a video suggesting that customers tell the baristas that their name was "Merry Christmas" so that baristas were forced to write it on the cups and shout "Merry Christmas" when calling off the drinks. This also started the trend #MerryChristmasStarbucks.

As a response to Feuerstein's video, people began the hashtag #ItsJustACup as a counter to the view that Starbucks "hated Christmas".

=== #RaceTogether marketing campaign ===
On Monday, March 16, 2015, Starbucks launched a marketing campaign to promote conversations about race between customers and employees. This marketing campaign also called for baristas to write the hashtag #RaceTogether on customers' cups—similar to how Starbucks is already known for writing customers' names on each cup. It was characterised as a "fiasco" by some media outlets, to the extent that Starbucks' vice president of public relations deleted his Twitter account. On March 22, Starbucks' CEO advised his employees there is no longer a need to write #RaceTogether on cups. Reuters reported that "Starbucks said the phase of the campaign that involved messages on drink cups was always scheduled to end Sunday."

=== "The Way I See It" ===
Quotes by artists, writers, scientists, and others have appeared on Starbucks cups since 2005 in a campaign called "The Way I See It". Some of the quotes have caused controversy, including one by writer Armistead Maupin about coming out and another by Jonathan Wells that linked 'Darwinism' to eugenics, abortion and racism. Disclaimers were added to the cups noting that these views were not necessarily those of Starbucks.

== Allegations of support for Israel and boycott ==
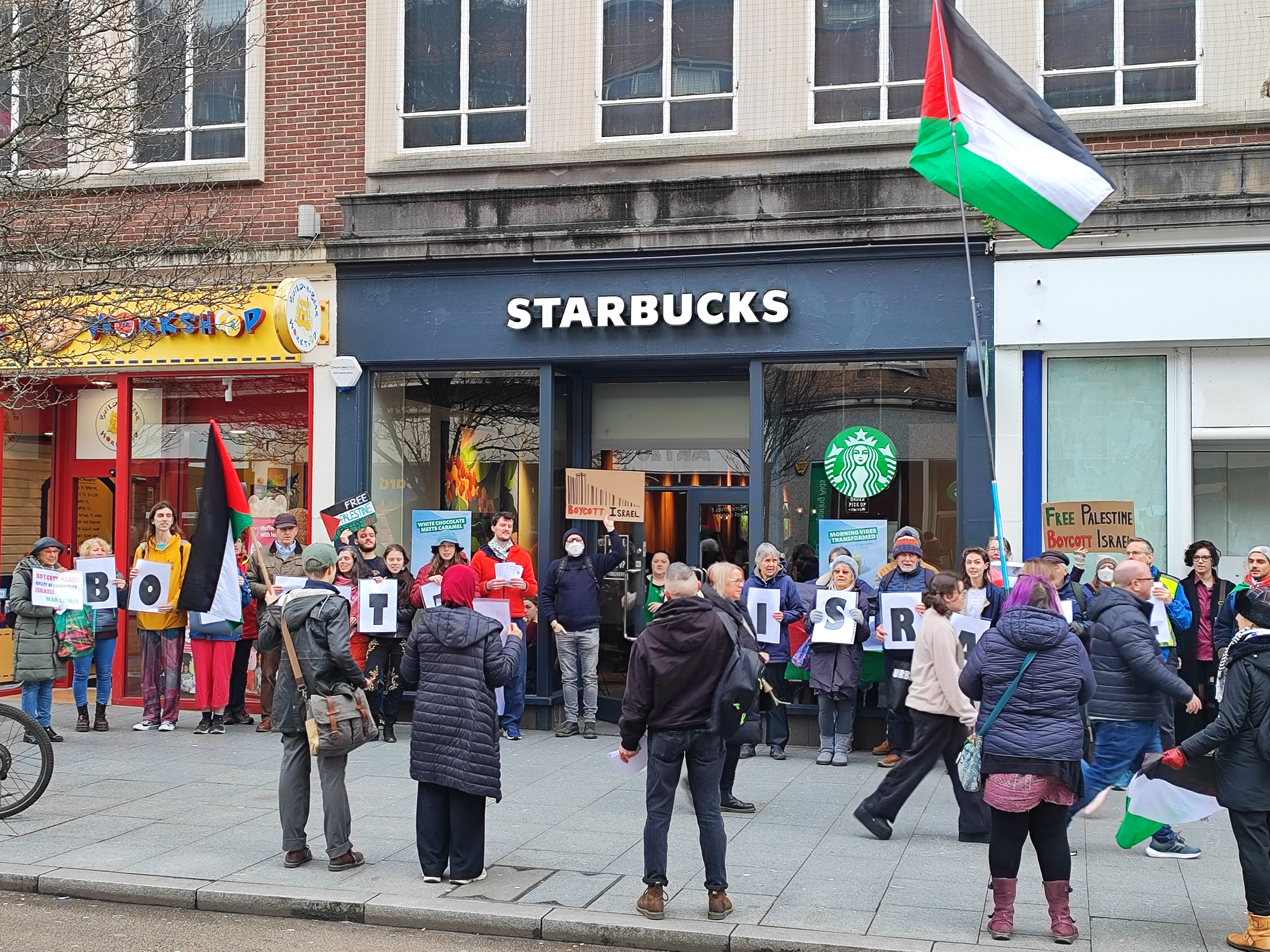
Pro-Palestinian protest outside Starbucks in Exeter, England on February 10, 2024

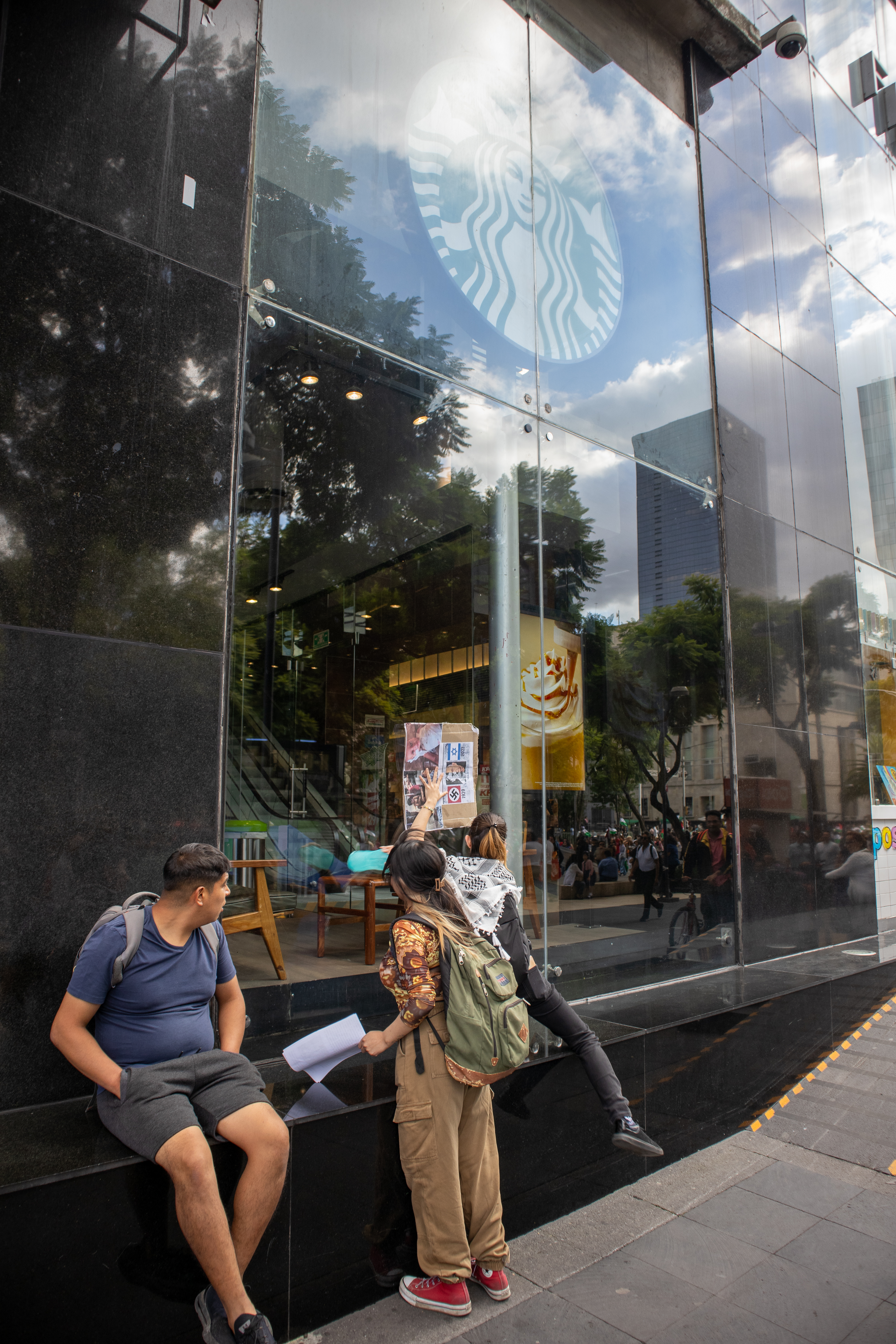
Protesters demonstrating against a Starbucks coffee shop during a march in Mexico City

=== Howard Schultz's support for Israel and the hoax letter ===
Despite having no stores in Israel since 2003, there have been calls for boycott of Starbucks stores and products because it has been claimed that Starbucks sends part of its profits to the Israeli military, but such allegations are based on a hoax letter attributed to the President, Chairman, and CEO of Starbucks Howard Schultz, who is Jewish and supports close ties between the United States and Israel. He is a recipient of several Israeli awards including "The Israel 50th Anniversary Tribute Award" for "playing a key role in promoting a close alliance between the United States and Israel".

The hoax letter claiming that Schultz had donated money to the Israeli military was actually written by an Australian weblogger, Andrew Winkler, who has admitted fabricating the document. Starbucks responded to these claims, widely circulated on the internet, stating that "Neither Chairman Howard Schultz nor Starbucks fund or support the Israeli Army. Starbucks is a non-political organization and does not support individual political causes". The protests against Starbucks derived from the Winkler letter were not the first; earlier protests occurred in June 2002 in Cairo, Dubai and Beirut universities in response to Schultz's criticism of Yasser Arafat. Starbucks was a regular target of activists protesting against Israel's role in the 2008 Gaza War over the claims.

Organizations have urged a boycott of Starbucks, accusing Starbucks of serving as an ally of Israeli militarists. In 2009, demonstrators in Beirut hung several banners on the shop's window and used white tape to paste a Star of David over the green-and-white Starbucks sign. They also distributed a letter saying, Schultz "...is one of the pillars of the American Jewish lobby and the owner of the Starbucks," which they said donates money to the Israeli military. In January 2009, anti-Israeli demonstrators broke windows of two Starbucks stores and reportedly ripped out fittings and equipment after clashes with riot police. Starbucks, which previously operated locations in Israel, under a partnership with Delek Group of Israel, stated that they did not close the Israeli locations due to political reasons, but due to market challenges.

=== The Gaza war ===
Calls for a boycott were again started as a result of the Gaza war following a legal dispute with Starbucks Workers United. On October 9, two days after the initial Hamas attack against Israel, Starbucks Workers United reposted an image of a bulldozer tearing down a portion of Israel's border fence with the caption, "Solidarity with Palestine!" The post was shortly removed. Starbucks alleges that it received more than one thousand complaints and some threats against employees from customers who believed that Starbucks endorsed the message. After the union refused to stop using the company name and a similar logo, Starbucks filed suit for trademark infringement. Starbucks Workers United counter-sued Starbucks, alleging that the company had defamed it by implying that it supports terrorism. A consumer boycott ensued. The company reportedly lost $11 billion in market value partially as a result of the boycotts from November to December 2023.

Starbucks reported a 47% increase in net income in its 2024 quarterly report, reaching $558 million. However, global sales fell by 2%, while total revenue grew to $3.8 billion. The decline in performance was attributed to international sanctions following the company’s stance on the Israeli-Palestinian conflict. Additionally, Starbucks experienced its sixth consecutive quarter of sales declines in the United States.

== U.S. military shared email on Iraq ==
A US Marines Sergeant emailed ten of his friends in August 2004 having wrongly been told that Starbucks had stopped supplying the military with coffee donations because the company did not support the Iraq War. The email was shared online with tens of millions of people. Starbucks and the originator sent out a correction, but Starbucks' VP of global communications, Valerie O'Neil, said in September 2009 that the email was still being forwarded to her every few weeks.

== Gun controversy ==
As gun laws in many US states have become more relaxed, and more states have adopted open carry or concealed carry statutes, some gun owners have begun carrying guns while performing everyday shopping or other tasks. Many stores and companies have responded by banning the carrying of guns on their premises, as allowed by many states' local laws. Starbucks has not instituted an official policy banning guns in their stores. In 2010, the Brady Campaign proposed a boycott of Starbucks due to their gun policy. At that time, Starbucks released a statement saying "We comply with local laws and statutes in all the communities we serve. That means we abide by the laws that permit open carry in 43 U.S. states. Where these laws don't exist, openly carrying weapons in our stores is prohibited. The political, policy and legal debates around these issues belong in the legislatures and courts, not in our stores."

In 2012, the National Gun Victims Action Council published an open letter to Starbucks, asking them to revise their policy, and also proposed a "Brew not Bullets" boycott of the chain until the policy is changed, with Valentine's Day selected as a particular day to boycott the chain. In response, gun rights advocates started a counter "Starbucks Appreciation Day" buycott to support Starbucks' stance, and suggested paying for products using two-dollar bills as a sign of Second Amendment support. On July 29, 2013, Moms Demand Action for Gun Sense in America, initiated a petition demanding a ban on guns in Starbucks stores. On September 17, 2013, founder and CEO Howard Schultz asked customers to no longer bring guns into its stores. He made the comments in an open letter on the company's website. Schultz said he was not banning guns, but making a request.

== Political positions ==
=== Same-sex marriage ===
In January 2012, a Starbucks executive stated that the company supports the legalization of same-sex marriage. This resulted in a boycott by the National Organization for Marriage, a political organization that opposes same-sex marriage, who received 22,000 signatures in favor of their boycott. When another shareholder (who had been quoted by NOM before) mentioned during a meeting that recent earnings had been "disappointing" since the boycott began, CEO Howard Schultz responded: "If you feel, respectfully, that you can get a higher return than the 38 percent you got last year, it's a free country. You can sell your shares of Starbucks and buy shares in another company. Thank you very much." In addition, 640,000 people also signed a petition thanking Starbucks for its support. (As of June 26, 2015, same-sex marriage in the United States is legal in all states following the Supreme Court ruling in Obergefell v. Hodges.) Muhammadiyah, the second largest Muslim group in Indonesia with 29 million members, and Perkasa, a group with 700,000 members, have called for a boycott of Starbucks over its support of gay rights.

=== Syrian refugees ===
On January 27, 2017, President Donald Trump signed an executive order to indefinitely suspend the entry of Syrian refugees into the United States and suspended entry into the United States of nearly all citizens of seven countries until "extreme vetting" measures could be implemented. The same day, Starbucks' Chairman and CEO Howard Schultz wrote a letter to Starbucks' employees, stating in part, "There are more than 65 million citizens of the world recognized as refugees by the United Nations, and we are developing plans to hire 10,000 of them over five years in the 75 countries around the world where Starbucks does business. And we will start this effort here in the U.S. by making the initial focus of our hiring efforts on those individuals who have served with U.S. troops as interpreters and support personnel in the various countries where our military has asked for such support." As a result of Schultz's letter, supporters of President Trump's executive order supported a boycott of Starbucks, with some saying that Starbucks should give more help to American veterans.

== California cancer warning rule ==
In March 2018, a California judge ruled that Starbucks and other companies must provide warning labels on all coffee products, warning consumers of chemicals that may cause cancer, a requirement by California law which Starbucks was found in violation of. The chemical in question is acrylamide, a carcinogen byproduct of roasted coffee beans found in high levels throughout brewed coffee. Declining to comment, Starbucks instead referred to a statement by the National Coffee Association claiming that cancer warnings on products would be "misleading". After the first phase of the trial, Starbucks may be subject to civil proceeding penalties of fines up to $2,500 per consumer exposed over the last eight years.

== Philadelphia arrests ==
On April 12, 2018, two African-American men, Donte Robinson and Rashon Nelson, were arrested in a Starbucks store in Philadelphia, Pennsylvania. A witness at the time of the arrests said that the men asked the staff if they could use the bathroom to which an employee said it was reserved for paying customers. The men waited at a table for another person without ordering and were instructed by the staff to either make a purchase or leave. When they did not comply, the store manager called the police. A police incident report later released revealed the two men had cursed at the manager and repeatedly insulted the police. Robinson and Nelson were arrested, but released without charges being pressed. The video of the arrest went viral and prompted the CEO of Starbucks Kevin Johnson to issue an apology. On ABC's Good Morning America, Johnson appeared for an interview and expressed his desire to meet with the men in person to apologize. He referred to the arrests as "reprehensible", and promised to take steps to prevent future incidents. Philadelphia mayor Jim Kenney criticized the company and called for revisions of the company's policies. The incident led to protests at the shop where the arrests occurred and caused outrage. The company had announced that the store manager was no longer working at the store. The police commissioner, Richard Ross Jr., said the police officers did nothing wrong, having made multiple requests for the men to leave before arresting them. As tension grew, the cafe was closed for a few hours on April 16.

After the event, Starbucks released a statement on plans to shut stores and corporate offices on May 29 for racial-bias education for approximately 175,000 U.S. employees. On May 2, it was reported that the two men settled for a symbolic $1 each and a promise from City officials that a program for young entrepreneurs would be established. This is separate from the Starbucks financial settlement that was announced in a joint statement between the two men and Starbucks. In the settlement, Starbucks promised to help the two men earn their bachelor's degrees with the tuition covered.

Starbucks worked with two organizations to plan the curriculum for the anti-bias training, SYPartners and The Perception Institute. The training took place in Starbucks stores and were unfacilitated. Participants used iPads and guidebooks to direct them.

The anti-bias training was planned to be in collaboration with the Anti-Defamation League, a Jewish civil rights organization. Tamika Mallory, a prominent activist and organizer of the 2017 Women's March, criticized the decision, accusing the ADL of "attacking black and brown people," further remarking in a tweet that "The ADL sends US police to Israel to learn their military practices. This is deeply troubling. Let's not even talk abt [sic] their attacks against .@blacklivesmatter." Starbucks was subsequently reported by Politico to have dropped the ADL from its anti-bias training, a decision that critics called "giving in to bigotry." A Starbucks spokesperson disputed that the change was in response to political pressure, saying it was "architecting a multi-phase approach to addressing bias."

== Pay equity ==
In March 2018, Starbucks announced that it had closed its gender and racial pay gaps in the United States, reaching 100% pay equity. The following year, shareholder activist, Natasha Lamb of Arjuna Capital, filed a shareholder proposal for median pay disclosure from Starbucks to prove their claim. Starbucks provided the requested data, and Arjuna withdrew its proposal prior to the shareholder vote. However, some were skeptical of their claim and the provided data, including data scientists, who alleged that Starbucks was sharing the data in a way that hid discrepancies.

In early 2019, Cher Scarlett, a former lead software engineer at the company who worked remotely out of St. Louis, Missouri, called out on Twitter that she had been subjected to a "long-standing" gender-based wage gap that she fought to have successfully addressed, and wrote a blog post about what she alleged to be a practice at the company of paying lower wages in areas that were predominantly black.

In 2020, UNITE HERE audited more than 2,000 employees' wage data over a nine-month period for 2019, and found that the median pay for black baristas was less than it was for white employees. Starbucks claimed the data did not take geography into account, and could have explained any discrepancy in pay.

== Labor issues and union busting ==
=== 2004–2008 ===
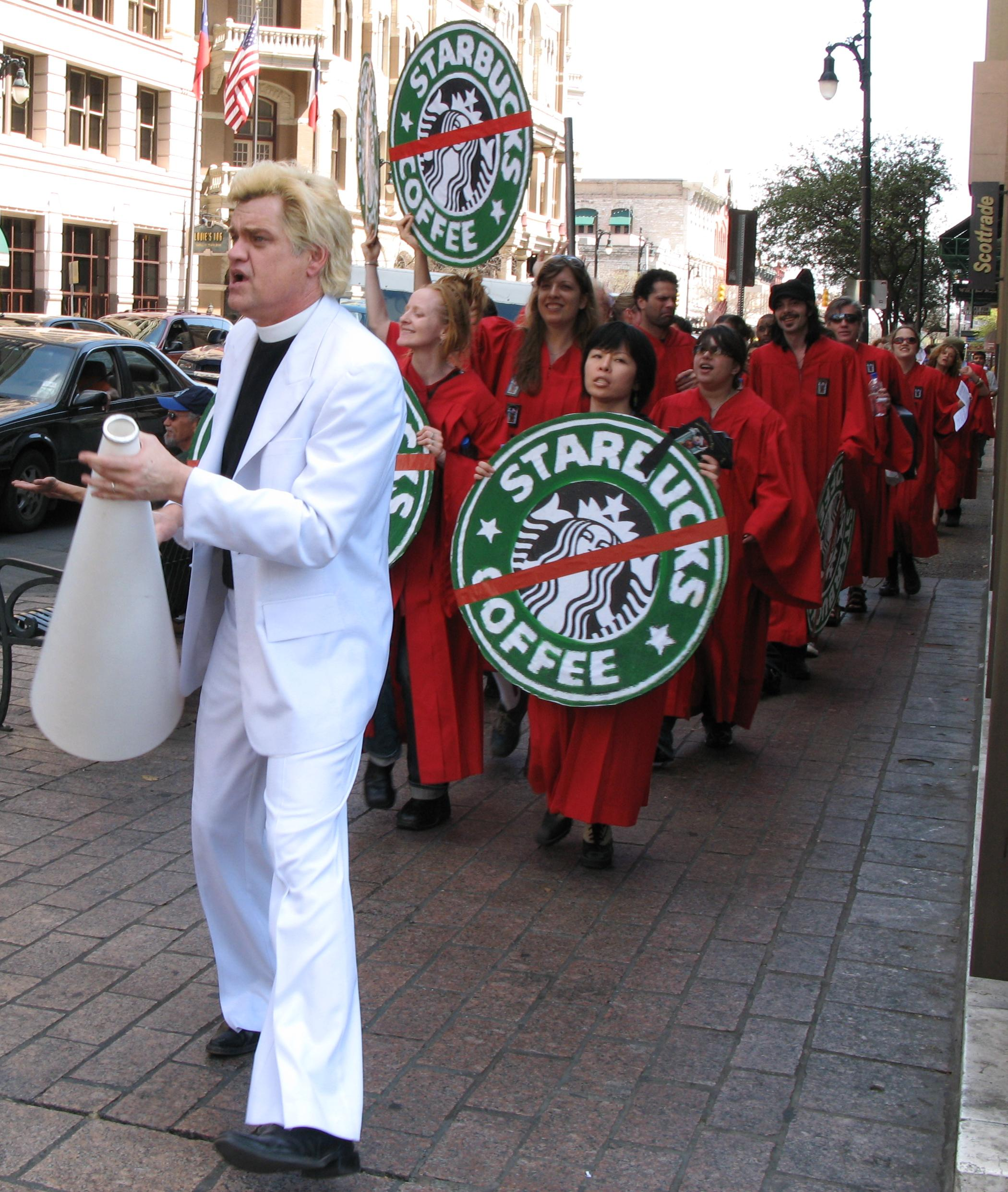
The Reverend Billy leading an anti-Starbucks protest in Austin, Texas, in 2007

Starbucks workers in seven stores have joined the Industrial Workers of the World (IWW) as the Starbucks Workers Union since 2004. In line with a Starbucks Union press release, since then, the union membership has begun expanding to Chicago and Maryland in addition to New York City, where the movement originated. On March 7, 2006, the IWW and Starbucks agreed to a National Labor Relations Board (NLRB) settlement in which three Starbucks workers were granted almost US$2,000 in back wages and two fired employees were offered reinstatement. According to the Starbucks Union, on November 24, 2006, IWW members picketed Starbucks locations in more than 50 cities around the world in countries including Australia, Canada, Germany, and the UK, as well as U.S. cities including New York, Chicago, Minneapolis, and San Francisco, to protest the firing of five Starbucks Workers Union organizers by Starbucks and to demand their reinstatement.

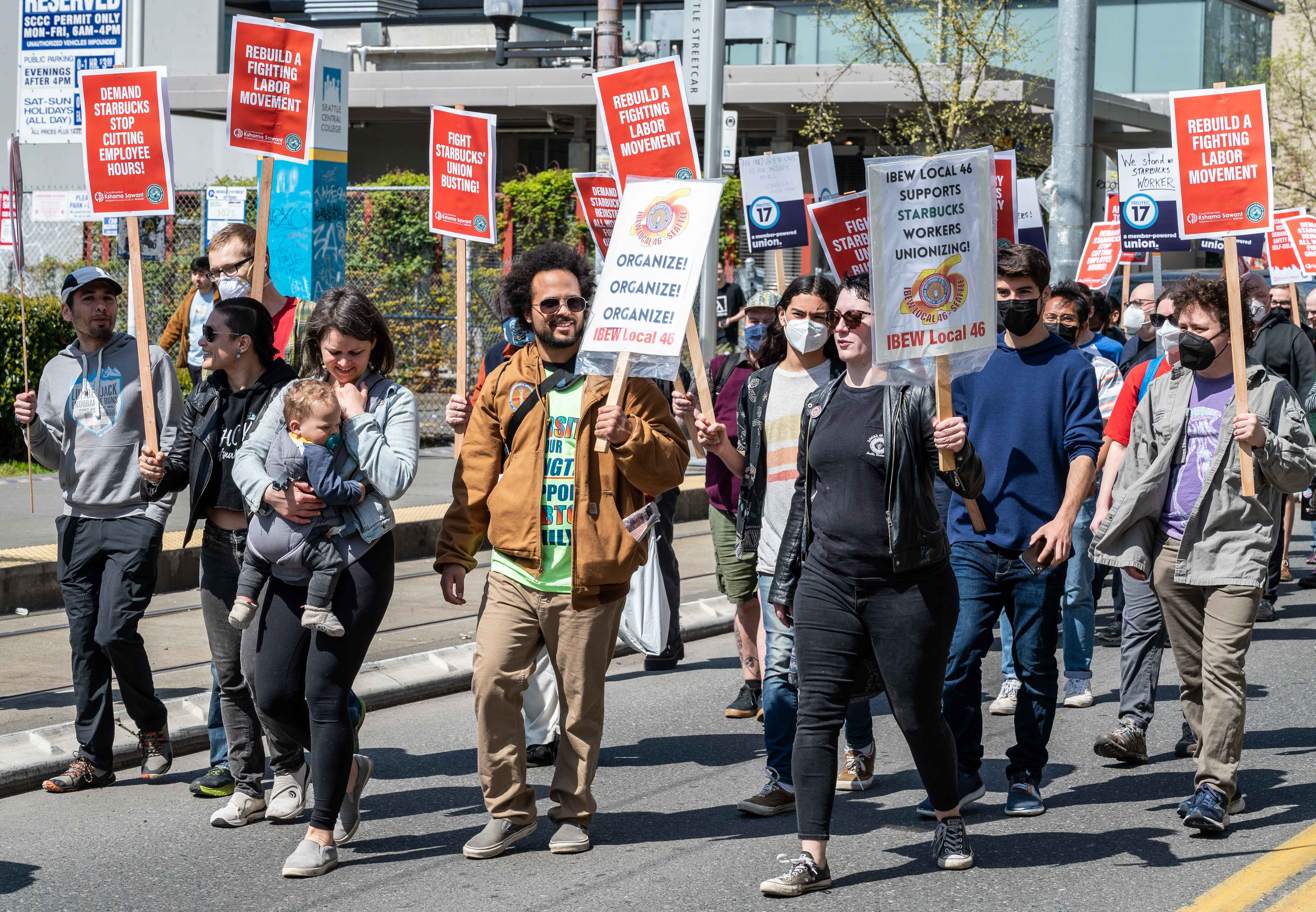
Starbucks workers rally and march in Seattle

Some Starbucks baristas in Canada, Australia and New Zealand, and the United States belong to a variety of unions. In 2005, Starbucks paid out US$165,000 to eight employees at its Kent, Washington, roasting plant to settle charges that they had been retaliated against for being pro-union. At the time, the plant workers were represented by the International Union of Operating Engineers. Starbucks admitted no wrongdoing in the settlement. A Starbucks strike occurred in Auckland, New Zealand, on November 23, 2005. Organized by Unite Union, workers sought secure hours, a minimum wage of NZ$12 an hour, and the abolition of youth rates. The company settled with the Union in 2006, resulting in pay increases, increased security of hours, and an improvement in youth rates. In March 2008, Starbucks was ordered to pay baristas over US$100 million in back tips in a Californian class action lawsuit launched by baristas alleging that granting shift-supervisors a portion of tips violates state labor laws. The company plans to appeal. Similarly, an 18-year-old barista in Chestnut Hill, Massachusetts, has filed another suit with regards to the tipping policy. Massachusetts law also states that managers may not get a cut of tips. A similar lawsuit was also filed in Minnesota on March 27, 2008.

=== Philadelphia, Pennsylvania (2019–2020) ===
In 2019 and 2020, the NLRB found that Starbucks had illegally retaliated against and surveilled two workers in the Philadelphia store who had engaged in attempts to unionize the store. Starbucks unsuccessfully challenged the NLRB's findings.

=== Buffalo, New York (2021) ===
In August 2021, 49 baristas in Buffalo, New York wrote a letter to Johnson indicating their intention to file the formation of three unions backed by Workers United with the NLRB.

In November 2021, Starbucks began what some referred to as an "aggressive union-busting" campaign against the workers, including mandatory "listening" sessions at the three stores which had filed to vote for unionizing with the NLRB. Will Westlake, a barista at one of the stores, said that the meetings "started off by going around and saying that they wanted me to vote no for the union. And then they went back and forth talking about how great all the benefits are at Starbucks and if we vote in a union, we may not have any of those benefits," and that they would not allow feedback on their "anti-union" talking points from the workers. According to KIRO-TV, the workers received communications from the company that a union would not solve the problems the stores identified.

Workers told reporters that the three stores faced numerous meetings with management and corporate leadership, and the affected stores having unscheduled remodels, shutdowns, and closures. Additionally, workers said that they were contacted with negative talking points by methods previously reserved for emergencies, and were invasively surveilled and questioned about their personal lives. The workers further alleged that they had unexpected visits from executives to suppress union organizing, including Schultz.

On November 6, 2021, Schultz spoke to workers at Buffalo hotel, the video of which was later posted on Starbucks' corporate YouTube account. Schultz presented workers with a case against unionizing, including using his Jewish heritage and The Holocaust to describe the company's mission, saying that they were trying to "share their blanket" with employees, referring to Holocaust prisoners in Poland survival tactic of sharing limited resources amongst each other. The narrative was met with wide-spread criticism on social media. Schultz claimed that while the company "isn't perfect", they are addressing worker issues to improve conditions, including pay raises. However, according to Cassie Fleischer, another organizer and union member at the unionized Elmwood store, all of the union's requests were denied in a union bargaining meeting, including that the company pay "out-of-pocket costs on coronavirus tests".

Starbucks has said that the closures were a coincidence, and that the additional staff was to support the stores, and denied all claims that they have engaged in union busting. According to workers at the Cheektowaga location, 100% of their 21 employees signed the petition, but by the time the vote happened in December, the staff had more than doubled to 46.

Initially, only the Elmwood store successfully unionized, while the other two failed to pass, and filed charges with the NLRB against Starbucks, and challenged the votes. The Cheektowaga location won their challenge, alleging that many of the votes against unionizing came from members that had been transferred into the store temporarily to sway the vote. The union was certified by the NLRB on January 10, 2022. As of December 2021, the NLRB was investigating the charges.

On February 20, 2022, Starbucks terminated Fleischer, allegedly for "no longer meeting the needs of the business". Fleischer said when she reduced her hours to part-time availability after getting a second job from the lack of livable wages working full-time for Starbucks in a Facebook post that gained media attention. On Twitter, Starbucks Workers United claimed "Starbucks has always allowed part-time partners before". Fleischer filed a charge with the NLRB for retaliatory discharge. Starbucks said that she had not been fired, but Fleischer said that she is unable to pick up work shifts and was removed from the schedule. Starbucks said they are working "to accommodate [her request for reduced hours] while also ensuring the store is adequately staffed".

The union is seeking injunctive relief from the NLRB to stop the alleged union busting while the stores continue their union drive.

=== Memphis, Tennessee (2022) ===
In February 2022, Starbucks fired seven members of a unionizing store in Memphis, Tennessee. Brisack said that the firing may be the turning point for the company, saying "They can’t do this and be the company they say they are." Starbucks denies allegations that the terminations were unlawful, and that the firings were for "violations" of its security rules. The discharged employees had given an interview to a local news station, WMC-TV, after hours in the store, and a news anchor had posted it on Twitter, which the company later alleged was evidence of "egregious actions and blatant violations" of the company's safety and security protocols.

Starbucks Workers United spokesperson Casey Moore countered that the firings were an inconsistent application of Starbucks policies saying, "If Starbucks had consistently fired people for the violations they fired Memphis workers over, they would have a hard time keeping many people on staff at all". Kylie Throckmorton, one of the terminated workers, alleged that other employees had previously had non-employees in the store after hours and did not face any consequences.

Workers protested across the country to have the employees reinstated.

The union, with help of the National Labor Relations Board (NLRB), sued Starbucks in federal court. The federal district court issued a temporary injunction against Starbucks to rehire the workers while the case proceeded. This injunction was upheld at the federal appeals court. Starbucks petitioned to the Supreme Court of the United States to question the validity of the injunction, which the Supreme Court accepted to hear in the 2023–24 term under Starbucks Corporation v. McKinney.

=== Denver, Colorado (2022) ===
On March 11, 2022, baristas at a store in Denver, Colorado went on strike due to what they alleged to be union busting in the form of threats of job security and benefits if they petitioned to form a union.

=== Phoenix, Arizona (2022) ===
On March 15, 2022, the NLRB issued complaints against Starbucks based on two charges of unlawful discipline and termination of baristas Laila Dalton and Alyssa Sanchez.

=== Firing of workers involved in unions ===
In 2022, over a period of few months, Starbucks fired more than 85 workers in the US involved in organizing worker unions against unfair labor practices. The workers also accused Starbucks of creating a culture of fear and surveillance in the store.

=== 2025 strike ===
In November 2025, unionized baristas across the U.S. went on strike amid unfair labor practices and stalled contract bargaining.

=== Mistreatment of Employees ===
In December 2025, Starbucks agreed to pay more than $35m to thousands of workers in New York City to settle the city's claims that the company denied them stable schedules and arbitrarily slashed their hours.

== See also ==
- History of Starbucks
- Criticism of McDonald's
