= Starbucks Israel =

Coffee chain in Israel

Starbucks Israel (סטארבקס)
- Type: Subsidiary
- Industry: Fast-food restaurant
- Founded: Israel (2001)
- Defunct: 2003
- Headquarters: Tel Aviv, Israel
- Area served: Tel Aviv, Israel
- Key people: CEO - Micki Kenan; Chairman - Giora Sarig
- Products: Coffee
- Parent: Delek Group of Israel 80.5% Starbucks 19.5%

Starbucks Israel (Hebrew: סטארבקס) was a coffee chain in Israel, opening in 2001, with six locations in Tel Aviv before closing in 2003.

== History ==
=== Opening ===
Starbucks Coffee International, a subsidiary of Starbucks Coffee Company, partnered with Delek Group of Israel to form the Israeli subsidiary of Starbucks, under the joint venture known as Shalom Coffee Company. The joint venture, formed in 2001, was owned 19.5% by Starbucks and 80.5% by Delek, with Starbucks holding the option to increase their share to 50%.

Delek paid $250,000 for the franchise rights, plus owed 6% of sales to Starbucks.

Plans were for September 1, 2001 to have the first location open in Tel Aviv's Rabin Square. Starbucks had hoped to have 20 locations open in Israel within the first year.

=== Closing ===
In 2002, within a year of Starbucks Israel opening, Delek was already looking to sell its stake.

Before its closing, Starbucks had six locations in Tel Aviv, with 120 employees. Additionally they had previously planned on opening a location in Jerusalem but withdrew the plans due to fear of terror attacks. On March 31, 2003, Starbucks announced that they would be closing their stores in Israel.

Starbucks closing caused many controversies over rumors that the stores were closing due to political reasons. Many rumors began circulating on the internet that they were closing as part of an Arab boycott of American businesses in Israel. Based on information put out by Starbucks, no information pointed towards caving into anti-Israel pressure. Bill O’Shea, Starbucks VP of Business Development in Europe, Middle East and Africa, released a letter stating that Starbucks chose to close their Israel locations due to business reasons, not political.

=== Reemergence attempt ===
In September 2005 Starbucks hired MAN Properties Real Estate Consultants to explore options to return to Israel. Starbucks was looking for a managing partner to team up with in Israel for the renewed deployment strategy.

== See also ==
- Culture of Israel
- Israeli cuisine
- Economy of Israel
- List of restaurants in Israel
- Starbucks alleged support for Israel in the Gaza War
