= Faith Fighter =

Fight video game featuring religious figures

- Player selection screen From left, top row: God, Jesus, Buddha; Bottom: Ganesha, Budai, Muhammad
- Developer: Molleindustria
- Platform: Browser
- Genre: Beat 'em up
- Mode: Single-player

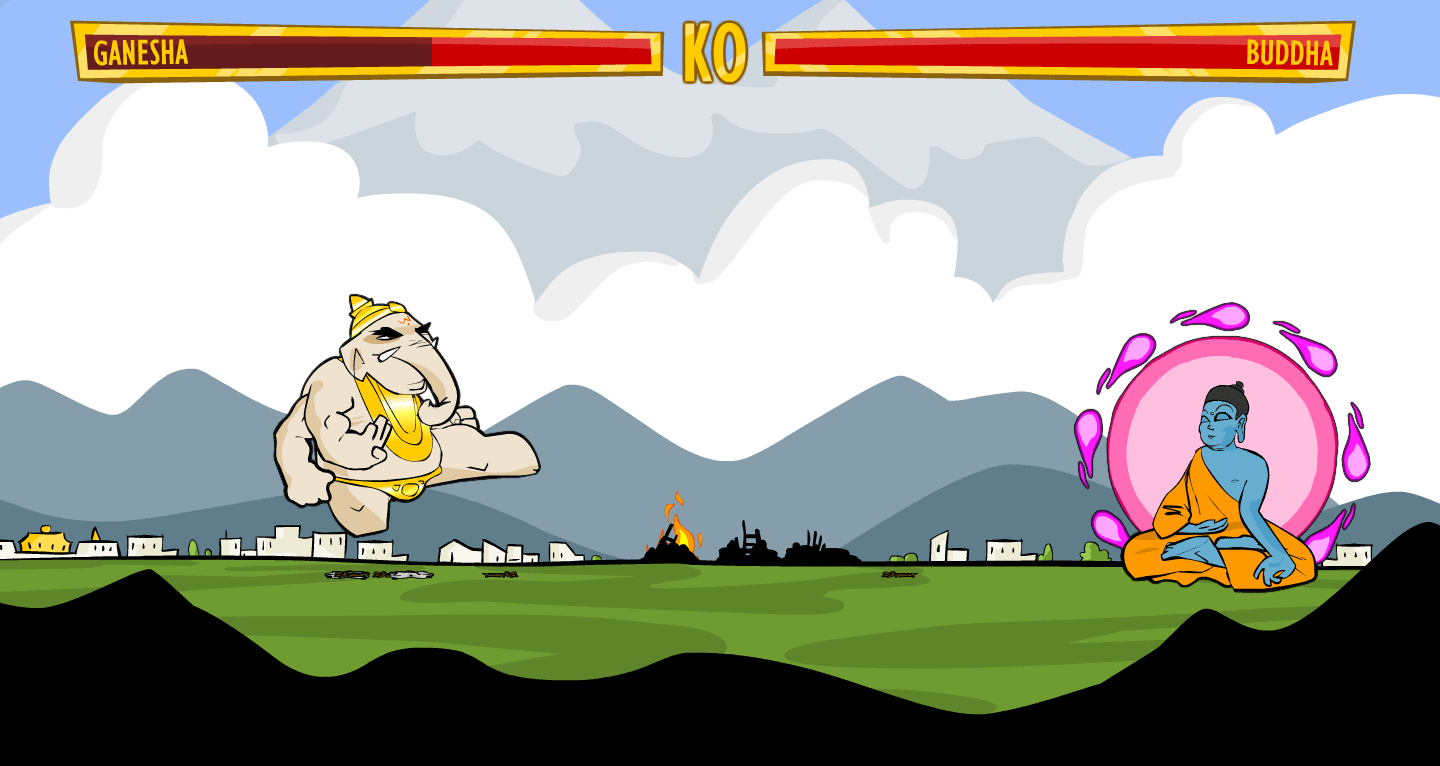
Screenshot

Faith Fighter is a Flash fighting game developed by the Italian website Molleindustria in which players fight as religious figures such as Gautama Buddha, Jesus or Muhammad and must fight Xenu after beating all playable characters.

The game was temporarily withdrawn from its hosting web site in late April 2009, in response to protests from the Islamophobia Observatory of the Organisation of the Islamic Conference In response, the game's creators posted a sequel to the game with the figure of Muhammad's face censored, in which the player must bestow "love" by clicking on each religious figure in turn: without this action, the figures slowly fade away. The original game has since been reposted on the maker's website.

In Brazil, Universo Online was forced to remove the game from its servers following a judicial ruling, in a case sponsored by a mosque in Barretos, São Paulo state.
