= The Republia Times =

2012 video game

- Screenshot of gameplay
- Developer: Lucas Pope
- Engine: Flixel
- Platform: Browser
- Release: April 2012
- Genre: Indie
- Mode: Single-player

The Republia Times is a free-to-play indie browser video game created by Lucas Pope, released in April 2012. In the game, the player takes the role of the editor of a newspaper torn between personal opposition to the government and threats to the lives of the editor's wife and children if the editor does not generate loyalty among the population.

Originally created as a warm up for a Ludum Dare game jam, The Republia Times was nominated in two categories in the Games for Change Awards.

In 2016, Swedish publisher Coffee Stain Studios released The Westport Independent, which is essentially a more fully featured version of the same basic idea and which also started out as a 72-hour game-jam project, though they have stated they were unaware of The Republia Times until the 72-hour version was complete.

== Gameplay ==
The player takes on the role of the news editor of The Republia Times, a leading newspaper in the fictional authoritarian nation of Republia. (Note: Republia later appears as one of several fictional countries in Pope's game Papers, Please. However, in Papers, Please the country is landlocked, which is not the case in this game.) The player determines which stories are included in each day's issue of the Times, and how much prominence each story receives. The player has to balance publishing pro-government stories to convince a skeptical public to support the oppressive government, while also publishing popular gossip stories to increase readership. The player must carefully choose which stories to publish, as the government is holding the editor's family hostage.

== Development ==
The Republia Times was developed by Lucas Pope, as a warm up for Ludum Dare 23, a game jam held April 20–23, 2012. It was his first Flash game, and he called Flash debugging "a nightmare".

== Reception ==
Rock, Paper, Shotgun called The Republia Times "Simple and not especially challenging (as only doing exactly what you're ordered to generally tends to be), it's compulsive and sharp regardless". Patricia Hernandez of Kotaku compared it to "something out of the book 1984" and thought that "despite being a somewhat simple game, The Republia Times is easy to pick up and provocative—especially once you get to the twist". Gamasutra named The Republia Times in their "Best of Indie Games".

=== Awards ===
The Republia Times was nominated in two categories in 2013's Games for Change Awards, for "Best Gameplay" and "Most Significant Impact Developer".

== See also ==
- The New York Times Simulator
