= The New York Times Simulator =

2024 video game

- Screenshot of gameplay
- Developer: Paolo Pedercini
- Platform: Browser
- Release: March 29, 2024
- Genres: News, simulation, satire

The New York Times Simulator is a 2024 satirical news game created by Molleindustria, the alias of Italian game designer Paolo Pedercini. The user plays as the editor of The New York Times, and must draw readership while keeping various interest groups happy. The game criticizes media coverage of the Gaza war and editorial bias while drawing on themes relating to Noam Chomsky's theory of manufactured consent.

== Gameplay ==
The player takes on the role of the editor-in-chief of The New York Times. As stories appear, they can be placed into one of four slots for articles on the front page of the paper. The goal of the game is to maximize readership with grabbing headlines, while also appealing to the approval ratings of three groups: the police, the rich, and the state of Israel. If at any point the player's approval with one of these factions drops too low, or they run out of readers, they will be "fired" and lose the game. The player has the option to alter potential articles as they appear, possibly reframing them to be more favorable to the groups they are trying to keep happy, often through the use of passive voice. For example, one article headline presented in the game is "Israel is starving Gaza's children", which may be rewritten to the passive voice headline "Starvation is Stalking Gaza's Children". Using the latter headline prevents the player from losing points with the Israel faction. The article slots above the fold are weighted more heavily and will draw more readership, with the main article slot, in the top left, worth the most. Articles will also lose readership the longer they are in the paper.

== Development and release ==
The game was released for free on March 29, 2024, on itch.io. The game mostly uses real headlines from The New York Times, The Wall Street Journal, and other media outlets, and in some cases the in-game headline revisions are edits which actually occurred to those headlines. The game took Pedercini approximately three weeks to complete. Pedercini used data from Fairness & Accuracy in Reporting to create the headlines used in the game, as well as Google News to compare how different outlets covered the same stories. Pedercini also annotated the game's data and released it to the public.

== Analysis ==
Pedercini says that the game is based on Noam Chomsky's idea of manufactured consent and the propaganda model of communication, as the game reflects Chomsky's theory that the need of news organizations to keep certain groups happy can result in self-censorship. The game was inspired by Pedercini's frustration with media coverage of the Gaza war. On his inspiration, Pedercini said, "The war crimes and the suffering of civilians are painstakingly documented, a great majority of Americans across party lines disapprove of Israel's conduct, and yet the Western elites united in supporting Netanyahu's government ... I think 'liberal' [publications] like The New York Times or The Washington Post are what these elites read, and they play a big role in manufacturing the consent for this genocide."

Many of the headlines have the option to reword them into passive voice, in order to shift responsibility for negative actions away from the groups the player must keep happy. For example, one option in the game for a headline covering Palestinians killed in an Israeli bombardment reads, "Lives Ended in Gaza". Critics, as well as Pedercini himself, have compared the game to The Republia Times, a similar news game set in a fictional authoritarian society.

== Reception ==
The game has been praised for its commentary, though according to critic Joshua Wolens it is "more an extended joke than it is a challenge", taking only about 10 minutes to beat. Ben Sledge of The Gamer gave the game a positive review, writing, "Put simply, I want my games to say something. The New York Times Simulator says a lot."

== See also ==
- List of The New York Times controversies
- The Republia Times
