= McDonald's Video Game =

2006 video game

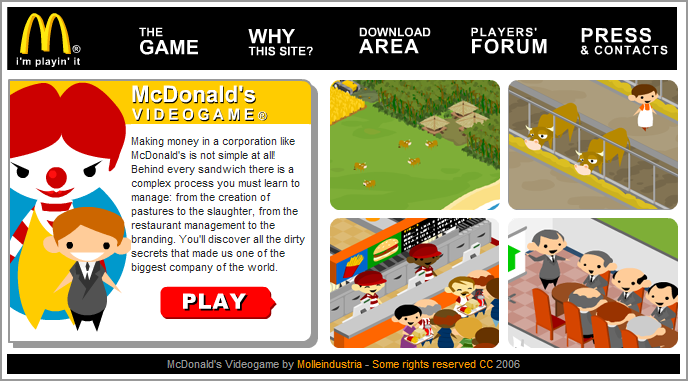
- Screenshot
- Developer: Molleindustria
- Publisher: Molleindustria
- Engine: Macromedia Flash 7
- Platform: Flash
- Release: February 1, 2006
- Genres: Tycoon simulation, parody
- Mode: Single-player

McDonald's Video Game is a Flash game published and developed by the Italy-based group Molleindustria in 2006. It is described as an "anti-advergame", meaning a satire of various companies and their business practices. It has also been classified as a newsgame or an editorial game by Ian Bogost.

== Overview and gameplay ==
McDonald's Video Game is a satirical parody of the business practices of the corporate quick-service restaurant giant McDonald's, taking the guise of a tycoon-style business-simulation game. The game presents the player with four views: the farmland, the slaughterhouse, the restaurant and the corporate HQ. Through each of these views, decisions can be made which will affect the fate of the player's company. In the game, the player takes on the role of a McDonald's CEO by choosing whether or not to feed the player's cows genetically altered grain, plow over rainforests or feed the player's cattle to other cattle (a practice known to spread mad cow disease). The player can also choose advertising strategies and public official corruption to counteract opponents of the player's actions.

Choices within the game include demolishing villages and bribing public officials. McDonald's issued a statement saying that the game "has no association with McDonald's and is therefore a complete misrepresentation of our people and our values."

== Release ==
On some websites (such as Kongregate), Molleindustria released a version of the game called Burger Tycoon which is exactly the same except that it eliminates all mention of McDonald's such as the franchise logo and a bear replacing the Ronald McDonald mascot. This was done in order to avoid intellectual property infringement. The game has been translated into nine languages: English, Spanish, Italian, Finnish, Danish, Turkish, Portuguese, French and German.
