= National Gun Victims Action Council =

American organization

- Founder: Elliot Fineman
- Website: www.gunvictimsaction.org

The National Gun Victims Action Council (NGVAC) is an American organization which advocates against gun violence and for gun control. The NGVAC uses targeted boycotts of various businesses and organizations in an attempt to persuade those organizations into changing their gun policies, or advocate for increased gun control. NGAC is based in Chicago, Illinois, and headed by Elliot Fineman, who "became active in gun control causes after his son was shot and killed in a San Diego restaurant in 2006 by a mentally ill man wielding a legally purchased handgun."

== Starbucks boycott ==
In 2010, the Brady Campaign proposed a boycott of Starbucks due to their gun policy. At that time, Starbucks released a statement saying "We comply with local laws and statutes in all the communities we serve. That means we abide by the laws that permit open carry in 43 U.S. states. Where these laws don’t exist, openly carrying weapons in our stores is prohibited. The political, policy and legal debates around these issues belong in the legislatures and courts, not in our stores."

In 2012, the National Gun Victims Action Council published an open letter to Starbucks, asking them to revise their policy, and also proposed a "Brew not Bullets" boycott of the chain until the policy is changed, with Valentine's Day selected as a particular day to boycott the chain.

After counter-protests by gun rights advocates, Starbucks founder and CEO Howard Schultz asked customers to no longer bring guns into its stores. He made the comments in an open letter published in September 2013 on the company's website. Schultz said he was not banning guns, but making a request.

== See also ==
- Open Carry
