= Paolo Pedercini =

Italian game designer (born 1981)

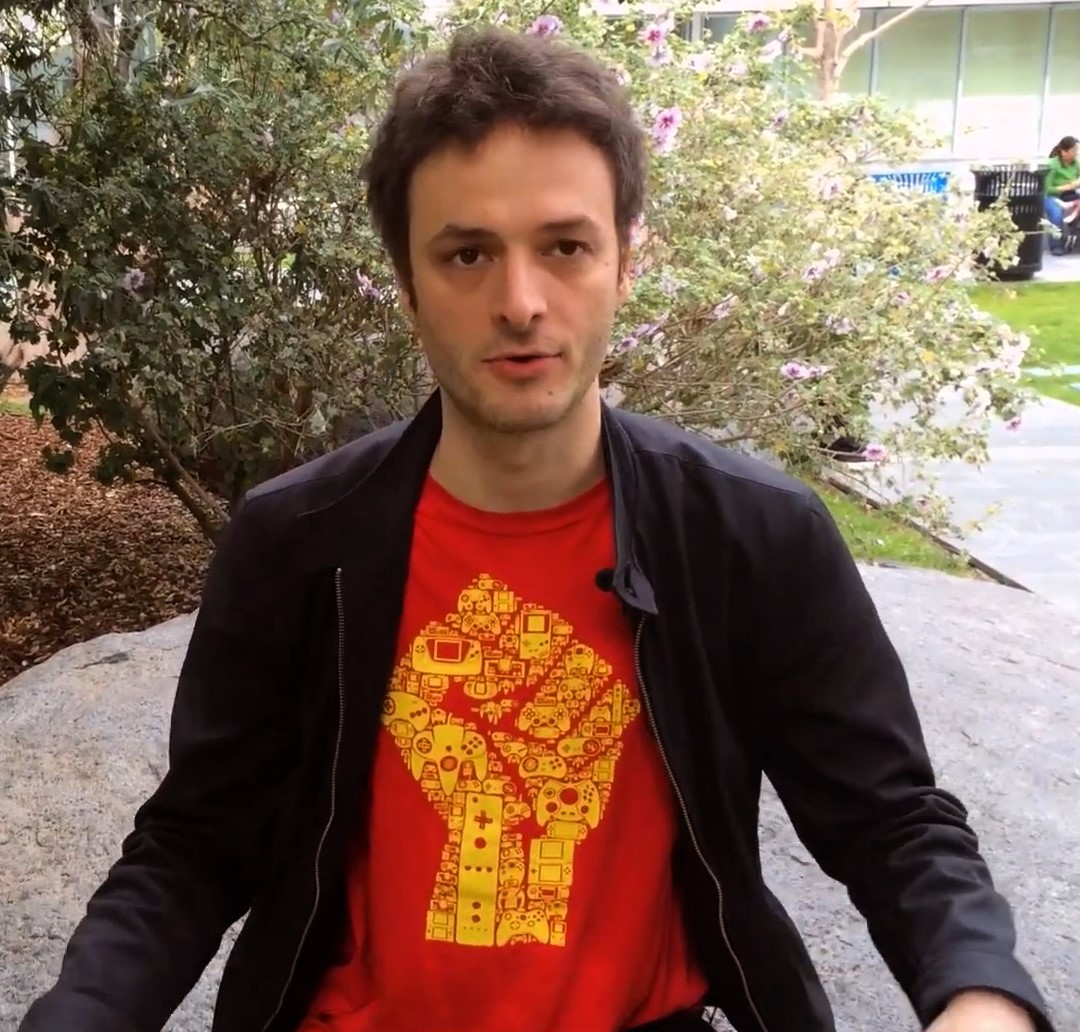
- Pedercini at the 2014 Game Developers Conference
- Born: 1981 (age 44–45)
- Education: Rensselaer Polytechnic Institute
- Occupation: Video game designer
- Years active: 2002–present
- Known for: McDonald's Videogame; Faith Fighter; Every Day the Same Dream; Phone Story; The New York Times Simulator
- Website: Official site

Paolo Pedercini (born 1981) is an Italian game designer known for making Flash videogames based on provocative left-wing socio-political points of view, on topics such as labour market flexibility and queer theory, in explicit opposition with the mainstream video game industry. He is known under the pseudonym Molleindustria, the name of his website. He created games such as Queer Power, Faith Fighter and the McDonald's Video Game. The games are often offered as freeware under a Creative Commons NonCommercial license.

== Works and activism ==
In 2003, Pedercini launched Molleindustria, a platform for politically active video games, along with a manifesto. The manifesto described Molleindustria as the "theory and practice of soft conflict – sneaky, viral, guerrillero, subliminal conflict – through and within videogames."

In June 2007 the game Operazione: Pretofilia (transl. Operation: Pedopriest) inspired by the controversial BBC documentary Sex Crimes and the Vatican, was removed from Pedercini's site after a point of order in the Italian Parliament called "Countermeasures to the religions' offences".

In April 2009, Pedercini initially bowed to complaints from the Organisation of the Islamic Conference by removing Faith Fighter from their site, but later put up a new version that gives the player the choice between a full and a censored version. Pedercini has later started producing a mock sequel that sarcastically pretends to promote religious pluralism and tolerance. Both games have since been put back on the website.

In September 2011, Pedercini released a game entitled Phone Story for smartphones that was banned from the Apple iTunes Store. Phone Story focused on what Pedercini considered the "dark side" of smartphone manufacturing. When Apple banned the game, he released the game for the Android market.

For the tenth anniversary of Molleindustria, his original manifesto was translated into English for the first time.

== Personal life ==
Pedercini was born in Italy and moved to the United States in 2007. He is an associate professor of art at Carnegie Mellon University, teaching game design. As of 2026, he lives in Pittsburgh with his wife, a graphic designer.

== Games ==
- Tamatipico (2003) – a game based on the life of a worker. The game was produced in support of the 2003 Italian referendum, which concerned worker rights.
- Tuboflex (2003) – a game based on the need of human resources vs. the demands of flex work.
- Orgasm Simulator (2003) – a game based on how women sometimes fake orgasms.
- Mayday Net Parade (2004) – a virtual parade for May Day, composed of precarious workers.
- Queer Power (2004) – a game based on how queer people change gender roles in a sexual setting.
- McDonald's Video Game (2005) – a game based on how the fast food industry works.
- Operation: Pedopriest (2007) – a game based on the sexual abuse cases of the Catholic Church.
- Faith Fighter (2008) – a game based on a satirical vision of religious intolerance.
- The Free Culture Game (2008) – a game based on the struggle between free culture and copyright laws.
- Oiligarchy (2008) – A game about how the oil industry works, loosely based on the theory of Peak Oil.
- Every Day the Same Dream (2009) – a game about short existence, alienation, and refusal of labor
- To My Favourite Sinner (2009)- a co-operative game set in hell. This game was re-released by LA Game Space in 2013.
- Ergon/Logos (2009) – non-linear visual poetry.
- Memory Reloaded (2010) – a game based on recent issues in the world.
- Run Jesus Run (2010) – "The ten second gospel".
- Leaky World (2010) – a game based on the issues of WikiLeaks.
- Inside a Dead Skyscraper (2010) – a game about the September 11 World Trade Center chaos and attacks.
- Phone Story (2011) – a game that looks at the hidden world of smartphone manufacturing, in particular relation to the Foxconn suicides.
- Unmanned (2012) – a game about the life of an unmanned drone pilot. Won the Grand Jury award at IndieCade 2012.
- The Best Amendment (2013) – a game that counters Wayne LaPierre's argument, made in the wake of the Sandy Hook Elementary School shooting, that "The only thing that stops a bad guy with a gun is a good guy with a gun."
- To Build A Better Mousetrap (2014) - a game that explores rise of automation in the workforce and its effects on workers (and profits).
- TrademarkVille (2014) – a word guessing game where trademarked words are disallowed. A critique of trademark abuse released in the wake of King's attempt to trademark the word "candy". Co-developed with Mikhail Popov.
- Nova Alea (2016) – A game on the forces that shape cities.
- A Short History of the Gaze (2016) – A visual essay on virtual reality.
- The Ills of Woman (2018) – a faux Victorian operation game.
- A Prison Strike (2018) – a game about the 2018 U.S. prison strike.
- Guilty Smells (2019) – A game where the player takes on the role of a sniffing dog for the Department for the Enforcement of the American Diet.
- Lichenia (2019) – An open-ended city building game built around sustainability.
- Democratic Socialism Simulator (2020) – A government simulation game akin to Reigns, aiming to highlight the challenges and obstacles a Bernie Sanders-like presidential administration would face.
- Green New Deal Simulator (2023) – A deck-building game focused on mitigating greenhouse gas emissions while balancing a budget.
- The New York Times Simulator (2024) - A news game where the player plays as the editor of The New York Times, balancing gaining readership with keeping interest groups happy.
- Future? No Thanks! (2026) – An open-world narrative game set in an ecosocialist future, following an elderly man who feels out of place in a society that has moved beyond the world he knew.

== See also ==
- Traceroute (documentary film)
- Hacktivism
