= Christmas controversies =

Christmas ideological, political and religious disputes

A 1931 edition of the Soviet magazine Bezbozhnik, published by the League of Militant Atheists, depicting an Orthodox Christian priest being forbidden to take home a tree for the celebration of Christmastide, which was banned under the Marxist–Leninist doctrine of state atheism

Christmas is the Christian celebration of the birth of Jesus Christ, which, in Western Christian churches, is held annually on 25 December. For centuries, it has been the subject of several reformations, both religious and secular.

In the 17th century, the Puritans had laws forbidding the ecclesiastical celebration of Christmas, unlike the Catholic Church or the Anglican Church, from the latter of which they separated. With the atheistic Cult of Reason in power during the era of the French Revolution, Christian Christmas religious services were banned and the three kings cake was forcibly renamed the "equality cake" under anticlerical government policies. Later, in the 20th century, Christmas celebrations were prohibited under the doctrine of state atheism in the Soviet Union. In Nazi Germany, Christmas celebrations were propagandized so as to serve the ideology of the Nazi party.

Modern-day controversy, colloquially known as the "war on Christmas", occurs mainly in China, the United States, and—to a much lesser extent—the United Kingdom. Some opponents have denounced the generic term "holidays" and avoidance of using the term "Christmas" as being politically correct. This often involves objections to government or corporate efforts to acknowledge Christmas in a way that is multiculturally sensitive. In China, the government not only does not recognize Christmas as a statutory holiday, but local governments restrict Christmas celebrations in some places.

== History ==
=== Date of Christmas Day ===
There are two competing theories on why 25 December was chosen as the date of Christmas, although theology professor Susan Roll writes that liturgical historians generally accept that it had some relation to "the winter solstice and the popularity of solar worship in the later Roman Empire". One theory is that the Church chose 25 December as the birthday of Jesus to appropriate the Roman festival of the "birthday of the Sun" at the winter solstice, which was on the same date; this is known as the "history of religions hypothesis". Another theory, the Calculation Hypothesis, posits that the birthdate of Jesus was calculated as nine months after a date chosen for Jesus's conception: 25 March, the Roman date of the spring equinox.

In Christian belief, the teaching that God came into the world in the form of man to atone for the sins of humanity, rather than the exact birth date, is considered to be the primary purpose in celebrating Christmas; the exact date of the birth of Jesus of Nazareth is considered a non-issue.

==== History of religions hypothesis ====
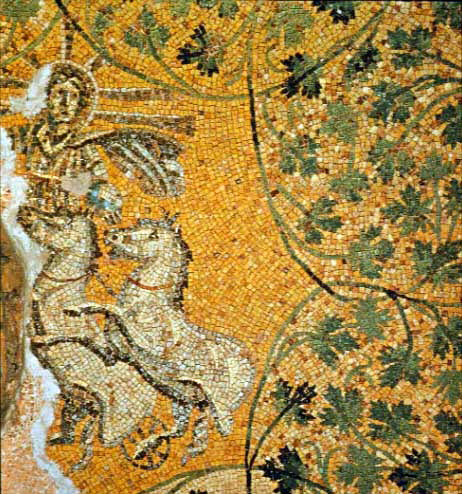
A mosaic dated to around 300 AD in the Tomb of the Julii, an apparently Christian tomb in the Vatican Necropolis. Most scholars believe it depicts Jesus as the sun god Sol / Helios.

The earliest document to place Jesus's birth on 25 December is the Chronograph of 354 (also called the Calendar of Filocalus), which also names it as the birthday of the Invincible Sun. Proponents of the "substitution theory" argue that pagan Romans were celebrating the winter solstice as the birthday of a Sun god before Christians began celebrating it as Jesus's birthday. The Calendar of Antiochus of Athens, c. second century AD, marks 25 December as the "birthday of the Sun". From AD 274, the Roman festival Dies Natalis Solis Invicti (birthday of Sol Invictus, the 'Invincible Sun') was held on 25 December. Sol Invictus became the chief god of the Roman Empire under Aurelian. Gary Forsythe, Professor of Ancient History, says: "This celebration would have formed a welcome addition to the seven-day period of the Saturnalia (December 17–23), Rome's most joyous holiday season since Republican times, characterized by parties, banquets, and exchanges of gifts". The Christian treatise De solstitiis et aequinoctiis, from the late fourth century AD, associates Jesus's birth with the "birthday of the sun" and Sol Invictus:

Our Lord, too, is born in the month of December ... the eighth before the calends of January [25 December] ... But they [the pagans] call it the 'birthday of the invincible one' (Invictus). But who then is as invincible as our Lord who defeated the death he suffered? Or if they say that this is the birthday of the sun, well He Himself is the Sun of Justice.

In a mid fifth century Christmas sermon, Pope Leo I rebukes those "who hold the pernicious belief that our celebration today seems to derive ... from, as they say, the rising of the 'new sun'." The theory is mentioned in an annotation added to a manuscript by 12th-century Syrian bishop Jacob Bar-Salibi. The scribe wrote:

It was a custom of the Pagans to celebrate on the same 25 December the birthday of the Sun, at which they kindled lights in token of festivity. In these solemnities and revelries, the Christians also took part. Accordingly, when the doctors of the Church perceived that the Christians had a leaning to this festival, they took counsel and resolved that the true Nativity should be solemnised on that day.

According to C. Philipp E. Nothaft, a professor at Trinity College Dublin, though the history of religions hypothesis "is nowadays used as the default explanation for the choice of 25 December as Christ's birthday, few advocates of this theory seem to be aware of how paltry the available evidence actually is."

==== Calculation hypothesis ====
Proponents of the "calculations theory" such as Louis Duchesne, Hieronymus Engberding and Thomas Talley, argue that Christmas was celebrated on 25 December before the Natalis Solis Invicti and suggest that Aurelian established it in order to compete with the Christian feast. They point out that in AD 221, Sextus Julius Africanus suggested the spring equinox, 25 March in the Roman calendar, as the day of creation and of Jesus's conception. While this implies a birth in December, Africanus did not offer a birth date for Jesus, and he was not an influential writer at the time. Adam C. English, professor of religion at Campbell University, has argued for the veracity of 25 December as Jesus's date of birth. The Bible in Luke 1:26 records the Annunciation to Mary to be at the time when Elizabeth, mother of John the Baptist, was in her sixth month of pregnancy. English assumes that Zechariah's ministry in the Temple, as described in Luke 1:5–23, took place on Yom Kippur the year before Jesus's birth; he then traces the narrative in the Gospel of Luke through the Annunciation and the birth of John the Baptist to conclude that Jesus was born on 25 December. Susan Roll, a critic of the calculations theory sees it as merely an attempt by early Christians to retroactively justify the winter solstice date.

=== Origin of customs ===
The Christian Council of Tours of 567 established Advent as the season of preparation for Christmas, as well as the season of Christmastide, declaring "the twelve days between Christmas and Epiphany to be one unified festal cycle", thus giving significance both to 25 December and to 6 January, a solution that would "coordinate the solar Julian calendar with the lunar calendars of its provinces in the east".

During the winter, the burning of logs was a common practice among many cultures across Northern Europe. In Scandinavia, this was known as the yule log and originally had a pagan significance; after the Christianization of Scandinavia, it may have been incorporated into the Christian celebration of Christmas there, with the pagan significance no longer remaining. However, as there are no existing references to a Christmas log prior to the 16th century, the burning of the Christmas block may have been an early modern invention by Christians unrelated to the pagan practice.

Many other Advent and Christmastide customs developed within the context of Christianity, such as the lighting of the Advent wreath (invented by Lutherans in 16th century Germany), the marking of an Advent calendar (first used by Lutherans in the 19th century), the lighting of a Christingle (invented by Moravians in 19th century Britain), and the viewing of a Nativity play (first enacted by Catholic monks in 11th century Italy).

=== Puritan opposition during the English Interregnum ===
Prior to the Victorian era, Christmas was primarily a religious holiday observed by Christians of the Roman Catholic, Anglican, and Lutheran denominations. Its importance was often considered secondary to that of Epiphany and Easter.

The Puritans as Calvinists objected to the Christian feast of Christmas. As previously with Calvin in Geneva during the English Interregnum, when England was ruled by a Puritan Parliament. Puritans sought to remove elements they viewed as unbiblical, from their practice of Christianity, including those feasts established by the Anglican Church. In 1647, the Puritan-led English Parliament banned the celebration of Christmas, replacing it with a day of fasting and considering it "a popish festival with no biblical justification", and a time of wasteful and immoral behaviour. Puritans disliked traditions that inverted social hierarchies, such as wassailing in which the rich were expected to give to the poor on demand, and which with the addition of alcohol sometimes turned into violent intrusions. Protests followed as pro-Christmas rioting broke out in several cities and for weeks Canterbury was controlled by the rioters, who decorated doorways with holly and shouted royalist slogans. The book The Vindication of Christmas (London, 1652) argued against the Puritans, and makes note of Old English Christmas traditions, dinner, roast apples on the fire, card playing, dances with "plow-boys" and "maidservants", old Father Christmas and carol singing. The Restoration of King Charles II in 1660 ended the ban. Poor Robin's Almanack contained the lines: "Now thanks to God for Charles return, / Whose absence made old Christmas mourn. / For then we scarcely did it know, / Whether it Christmas were or no." Many clergymen still disapproved of Christmas celebration. In Scotland, the presbyterian Church of Scotland also discouraged observance of Christmas. James VI commanded its celebration in 1618, but attendance at church was scant.

=== 17th and 18th centuries ===
In Colonial America, the Pilgrims of New England disapproved of Christmas. The Plymouth Pilgrims put their loathing for the day into practice in 1620 when they spent their first Christmas Day in the New World building their first structure in the New World—thus demonstrating their complete contempt for the day. Non-Puritans in New England deplored the loss of the holidays enjoyed by the laboring classes in England. Christmas observance was outlawed in Boston in 1659 in light of the impending Restoration with a fine of five shillings. It was also banned in the Province of New Hampshire and Maine, which were controlled by Massachusetts. The ban by the Puritans was revoked in New Hampshire in 1683 by Edward Cranfield and in Massachusetts in 1686 by an English appointed governor, Edmund Andros; however, it was not until the mid-19th century that celebrating Christmas became fashionable in the Boston region. Before the Declaration of Independence in 1776, it was not widely celebrated in the American Colonies.

When the state sponsored atheistic belief system, the Cult of Reason in power during the era of Revolutionary France, Christian Christmas church services were banned and the three kings cake was forcibly renamed the "equality cake" under antireligious government policies.

=== 19th century ===
With the appearance of the Oxford Movement in the Anglican Church, a revival in the traditional rituals and religious observances associated with Christmastime occurred. This ushered in "the development of richer and more symbolic forms of worship, the building of neo-Gothic churches, and the revival and increasing centrality of the keeping of Christmas itself as a Christian festival" as well as "special charities for the poor" in addition to "special services and musical events". Historian Ronald Hutton believes the current state of observance of Christmas is largely the result of a mid-Victorian revival of the holiday, spearheaded by Charles Dickens, who "linked worship and feasting, within a context of social reconciliation". Dickens was not the first author to celebrate Christmastide in literature, but it was he who superimposed his humanitarian vision of the holiday upon the public, an idea that has been termed as Dickens's "Carol Philosophy".

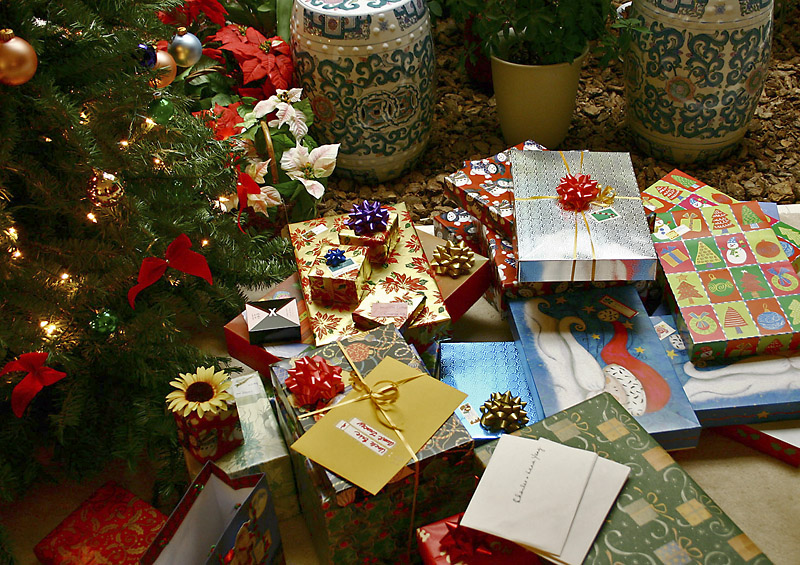
Modern celebrations of Christmas include more commercial activity in comparison with those of the past.

Historian Stephen Nissenbaum contends that the modern celebration in the United States was developed in New York State from defunct and imagined Dutch and English traditions in order to refocus the holiday from one where groups of young men went from house to house demanding alcohol and food into one centered on the happiness of children. He notes that there was a deliberate effort to prevent children from becoming greedy in response. Christmas was not proclaimed a holiday by the United States Congress until 1870.

=== 20th century ===
In the early 20th century, Christian writers such as C. S. Lewis noted what he saw as a distinct split between the religious and commercialized observance of Christmas, the latter of which he deplored. In Xmas and Christmas: A Lost Chapter from Herodotus, Lewis gives a satire of the observance of two simultaneous holidays in "Niatirb" ("Britain" spelled backward) from the supposed view of the ancient Greek historian Herodotus (484–425 BC). One of the holidays, "Exmas", is observed by a flurry of compulsory commercial activity and expensive indulgence in alcoholic beverages. The other, "Crissmas", is observed in Niatirb's temples. Lewis's narrator asks a priest why they kept Crissmas on the same day as Exmas. He receives the reply:

"It is not lawful, O Stranger, for us to change the date of Crissmas, but would that Zeus would put it into the minds of the Niatirbians to keep Exmas at some other time or not to keep it at all. For Exmas and the Rush distract the minds even of the few from sacred things. And we indeed are glad that men should make merry at Crissmas; but in Exmas there is no merriment left." And when I asked him why they endured the Rush, he replied, "It is, O Stranger, a racket ..."

The Soviet Union (until 1936), and certain other Communist regimes, banned Christmas observances in accordance with the Marxist–Leninist doctrine of state atheism. In the 1920s USSR, the League of Militant Atheists encouraged school pupils to campaign against Christmas traditions, such as the Christmas tree, and encouraged them to spit on crucifixes as protest against this holiday; the League established an antireligious holiday to be the 31st of each month as a replacement. Additionally the League of Militant Atheists organised festivals "specifically to denigrate religious holidays" in the USSR.

Most customs traditionally associated with Christmas, such as decorated trees (renamed as New Year Trees), presents, and Ded Moroz (Father Frost), were later reinstated in Soviet society, but tied to New Year's Day instead; this tradition remains as of the present day. However, most Russian Christians are of the Orthodox community, whose religious festivals (Christmas, Easter etc.) do not necessarily coincide precisely with those of the main western Christian churches (Catholic or Protestant), because of continued connection of the church calendar to the Julian calendar.

In Nazi Germany, Christmas celebrations were propagandized so as to serve the ideology of the Nazi party, including denial of the Jewish origin of Jesus.

The December 1957 News and Views published by the Church League of America, a conservative organization founded in 1937, attacked the use of Xmas in an article titled "X=The Unknown Quantity". The claims were picked up later by Gerald L. K. Smith, who in December 1966 claimed that Xmas was a "blasphemous omission of the name of Christ" and that "'X' is referred to as being symbolical of the unknown quantity." Smith further argued that Jews introduced Santa Claus to suppress the New Testament accounts of Jesus, and that the United Nations, at the behest of "world Jewry", had "outlawed the name of Christ". There is, however, a well-documented history of use of Χ (actually a chi) as an abbreviation for "Christ" (Χριστός) and possibly also a symbol of the cross. The abbreviation appears on many Orthodox Christian religious icons.

== By country ==
=== China ===
The People's Republic of China has a doctrine of state atheism and prior to the start of the Christmas season in 2018, the Chinese government shut down many Christian churches and arrested their pastors to prevent them from celebrating the holiday. The Human Rights Watch says Wang Yi, a member in the Christian community, pastor, and former legal scholar, is known for his criticism against the Chinese Communist Party and wrote an essay to them about the "unrighteous politics" of the "Communist Regime". According to NetEase, on the Christmas Day of 2014, a "Boycotting Christmas" campaign launched in downtown Changsha, Hunan Province, China.

=== United States ===
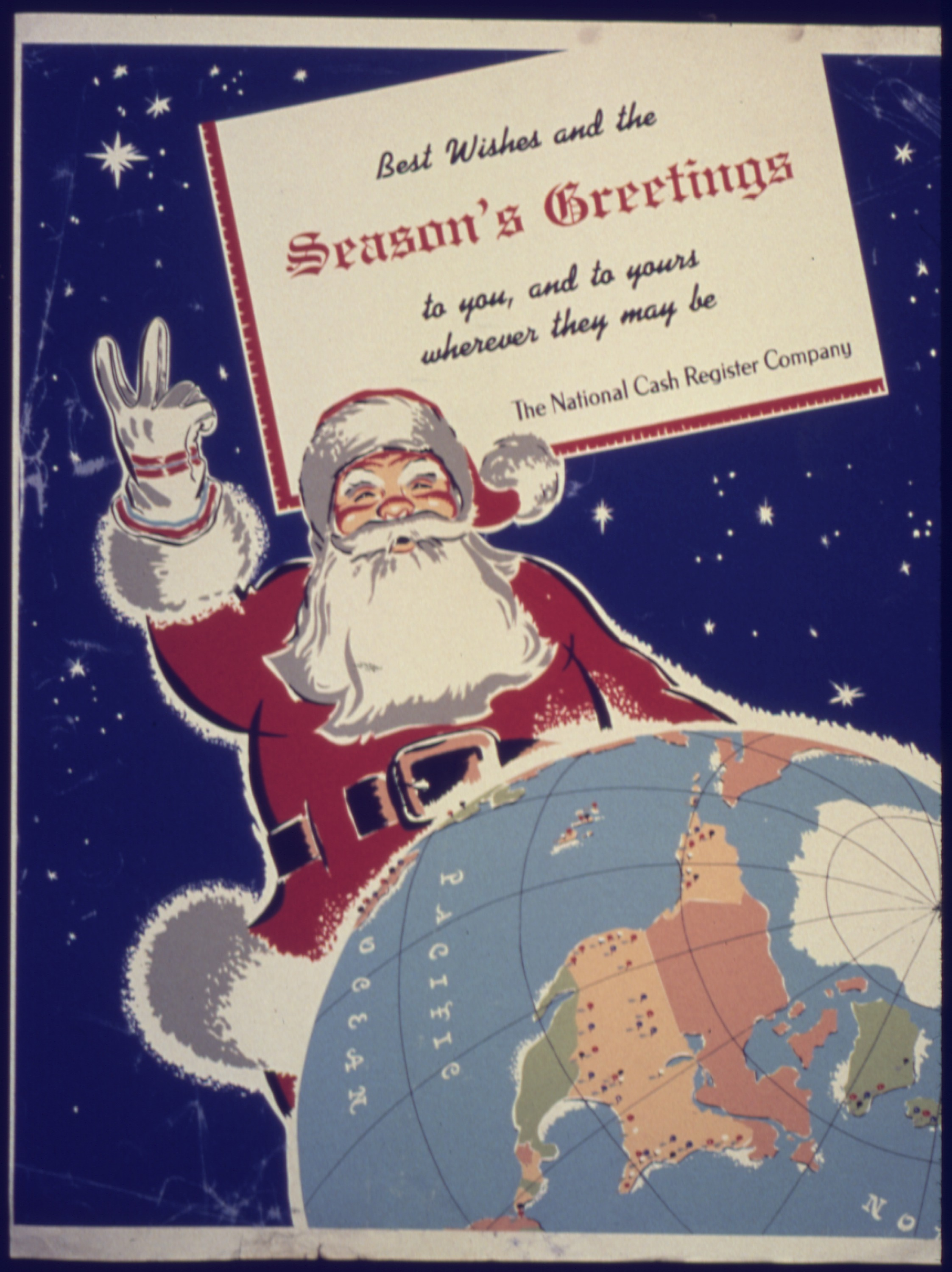
Season's Greetings, 1942–1943.

The expression "the War on Christmas" has been used in the media to denote Christmas-related controversies. The term was popularized by conservative commentators such as Peter Brimelow and Bill O'Reilly beginning in the early 2000s.

Brimelow, O'Reilly and others claimed that any specific mention of the term "Christmas" or its religious aspects was increasingly censored, avoided, or discouraged by a number of advertisers, retailers, government sectors (prominently schools), and other public and secular organizations. As the egalitarian term "holidays" gained popularity, some Americans and Canadians denounced that usage as a capitulation to political correctness.

Jeff Schweitzer, a commentator for The Huffington Post, addressed the position of commentators such as O'Reilly, stating that "There is no war on Christmas; the idea is absurd at every level. Those who object to being forced to celebrate another's religion are drowning in Christmas in a sea of Christianity dominating all aspects of social life. An 80 percent majority can claim victimhood only with an extraordinary flight from reality."

Heather Long, an American columnist for The Guardian, addressed the "politically correct" question in America over use of the term "holidays", writing, "people who are clearly celebrating Christmas in their homes tend to be conflicted about what to say in the workplace or at school. No one wants to offend anyone or make assumptions about people's religious beliefs, especially at work."

Christmas Day is recognized as an official federal holiday by the United States government. The American Civil Liberties Union argues that government-funded displays of Christmas imagery and traditions violate the U.S. Constitution—specifically the First Amendment, which prohibits the establishment by Congress of a national religion; on the other hand the Alliance Defending Freedom, a Christian advocacy organization, believes that Christmas displays are consistent with the First Amendment, as well as court rulings that have repeatedly upheld accommodationism. The debate over whether religious displays should be placed within public schools, courthouses, and other government buildings has been heated in recent years.

In some cases, popular aspects of Christmas, such as Christmas trees, lights, and decorating are still prominently showcased, but are associated with unspecified "holidays" rather than with Christmas. The controversy also includes objections to policies that prohibit government or schools from forcing unwilling participants to take part in Christmas ceremonies. In other cases, the Christmas tree, as well as Nativity scenes, have not been permitted to be displayed in public settings altogether. Also, several U.S. chain retailers, such as Walmart, Macy's, and Sears, have experimented with greeting their customers with "Happy Holidays" or "Season's Greetings" rather than with "Merry Christmas".

Supreme Court rulings, starting with Lynch v. Donnelly in 1984, have permitted religious themes in government-funded Christmas displays that had "legitimate secular purposes". Since these rulings have been splintered and have left governments uncertain of their limits, many such displays have included secular elements such as reindeer, snowmen and elves along with the religious elements. Other recent court cases have brought up additional issues such as the inclusion of Christmas carols in public school performances, but none of these cases have reached the Supreme Court.

A controversy regarding these issues arose in 2002, when the New York City public school system banned the display of Nativity scenes but allowed the display of what the policy deemed less overtly religious symbols such as Christmas trees, Hanukkah menorahs, and the Muslim star and crescent. The school system successfully defended its policy in Skoros v. City of New York (2006).

==== Retail ====
Since at least 2005, religious conservative groups and media in the United States, such as the American Family Association (AFA) and Liberty Counsel, have called for boycotts of various prominent secular organizations, particularly retail giants, demanding that they use the term "Christmas", rather than solely "holiday", in their print, TV, online, and in-store marketing and advertising. This was also seen by some as containing a hidden anti-Jewish message. All the major retailers named denied the charges.

==== 2000s ====
- In 2005, Walmart was criticized by the Catholic League for avoiding the word "Christmas" in any of their marketing efforts. The company had downplayed the term "Christmas" in much of its advertising for several years. This caused some backlash among the public, prompting some groups to pass around petitions and threaten boycotts against the company, as well as several other prominent retailers that practiced similar obscurations of the holiday. In 2006, in response to the public outcry, Walmart announced that they were amending their policy and would be using "Christmas" rather than "holiday". Among the changes, they noted that the former "Holiday Shop" would become the "Christmas Shop", and that there would be a "countin' down the days to Christmas" feature.
- In 2005, Target Corporation was criticized by the American Family Association for their decision not to use the term "Christmas" in any of their in-store, online, or print advertising.
- When it was revealed in November 2006 that Walmart would be using the term "Christmas" in their advertising campaign, an article about the issue initiated by USA Today pointed out that Best Buy Corporation would be among the retailers that would not be using "Christmas" at all in their advertising that year. Dawn Bryant, a Best Buy spokeswoman, stated: "We are going to continue to use the term holiday because there are several holidays throughout that time period, and we certainly need to be respectful of all of them." The AFA launched a campaign against Best Buy's policy. In reaction to the same policy, the Catholic League placed Best Buy on its 2006 Christmas Watch List.
- In late October 2008, U.S. hardware retailer The Home Depot was criticized by the AFA for using terms such as "holiday" and "Hanukkah" on their website, but avoiding the term "Christmas". The retailer responded by saying they will be adjusting their website to make references to Christmas more prominent. Snopes later stated that the AFA's characterization of Home Depot's advertising was false, as the retailer's advertising had initially included several instances of the word "Christmas".
- On 11 November 2009, the AFA called for a "limited two-month boycott" of Gap, Inc. over what they claimed was the "company's censorship of the word 'Christmas.'" In an advertising campaign launched by Gap on 12 November, the term "Christmas" was both spoken and printed on their website at least once, and a television ad entitled "Go Ho Ho" featured lyrics such as "Go Christmas, Go Hanukkah, Go Kwanzaa, Go Solstice" and "whatever holiday you wanna-kah". On 17 November, AFA responded to this campaign by condemning the ads for references to the "pagan holiday" of solstice, and declined to call off the boycott. On 24 November, the AFA ended the boycott, after learning from Gap's corporate vice president of communications that the company planned to launch a new commercial with a "very strong Christmas theme".

==== 2010s ====
- In November 2010, the word "Christmas" on two signs at Philadelphia's Christmas Village was removed by the organizers after complaints, but restored three days later after the mayor intervened.
- In 2014, Northwest University closed the campus completely on Christmas Eve, and all the requests for leave were rejected by the school officials.
- In November 2015, the coffee shop chain Starbucks introduced Christmas-themed cups colored in solid red and containing no ornamentation besides the Starbucks logo, contrasting previous designs which featured winter-related imagery, and non-religious Christmas symbols such as reindeer and ornaments. On 5 November, a video was posted on Facebook by evangelist and self-proclaimed "social media personality" Joshua Feuerstein, in which he accused Starbucks of "hating Jesus" by removing Christmas-oriented imagery from the cup, followed by him "tricking" a barista into writing "Merry Christmas" on the cup, and encouraging others to do the same. The video became a viral video, spurring discussions and commentary: businessman and Republican 2016 president-candidate (later elected) Donald Trump supported Feuerstein's claim by suggesting a boycott of Starbucks, saying that "If I become president, we're all going to be saying 'Merry Christmas' again." Many social media users, including other Christians, perceived the criticism to be an overreaction. In contrast to the controversy, the color red has been associated with Christmas since at least the 19th century, and is often present in Christmas decorations and Christian services, such as the red ribbon that is tied around the oranges used for Christingles. Also in 2015, Resolution 564 received 36 sponsors including Doug Lamborn to assert Christmas in public. Newt Gingrich's stance of defence against the supposed "War on Christmas" resonated in popular culture for years.

=== Canada ===
In 2007, a controversy arose when a public school in Ottawa, Ontario, planned to have the children in its primary choir sing a version of the song "Silver Bells" with the word "Christmas" replaced by "festive"; the concert also included the songs "Candles of Christmas" and "It's Christmas" with the original lyrics. In 2011, in Embrun, Ontario, near Ottawa, some parents were displeased when a school replaced the Christmas concert it had held in previous years with a craft sale and winter concert scheduled for February.

=== United Kingdom ===
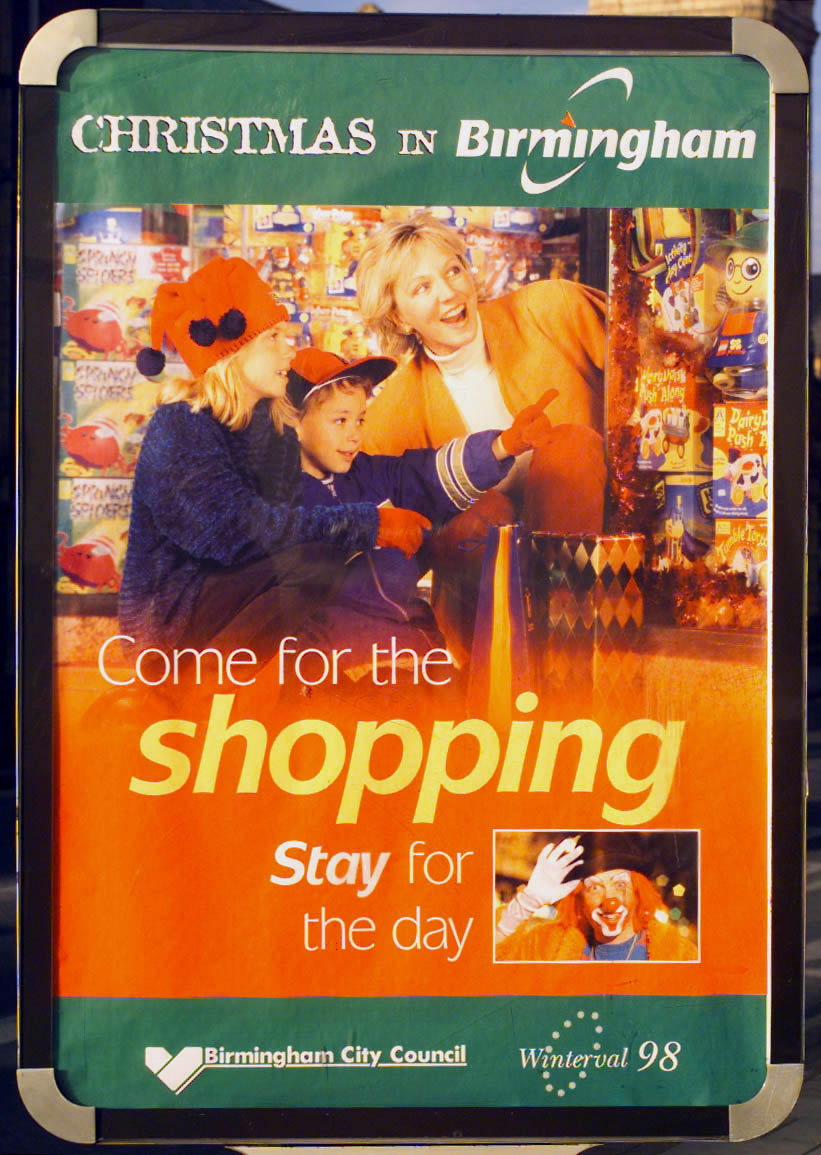
1998 'Christmas in Birmingham' poster, with the Winterval logo in smaller type than the word 'Christmas'

In the United Kingdom, the temporary promotion of the phrase Winterval for a whole season of events (first from 20 November to 31 December 1997 and then from Halloween to the Chinese New Year in January) by Birmingham City Council in the late 1990s remains a controversial example of "Christmas controversy". Critics attack the use of the word "Winterval" as being "political correctness gone mad", and accuse council officials of trying to take the Christ out of Christmas. The council responded to the criticism by stating that Christmas-related words and symbols were prominent in its publicity material: "there was a banner saying Merry Christmas across the front of the council house, Christmas lights, Christmas trees in the main civil squares, regular carol-singing sessions by school choirs, and the Lord Mayor sent a Christmas card with a traditional Christmas scene wishing everyone a Merry Christmas"

In November 2009, the city council of Dundee was accused of banning Christmas because it promoted its celebrations as the Winter Night Light festival, initially with no specific references to Christianity. Local church leaders were invited to participate in the event, and they did.

=== South Africa ===
The Christian holidays of Christmas Day and Good Friday remained in secular post-apartheid South Africa's calendar of public holidays. The Commission for the Promotion and Protection of the Rights of Cultural, Religious and Linguistic Communities (CRL Rights Commission), a chapter nine institution established in 2004, held countrywide consultative public hearings in June and July 2012 to assess the need for a review of public holidays following the receipt of complaints from minority groups about unfair discrimination. The CRL Rights Commission stated that they would submit their recommendations to the Department of Home Affairs, the Department of Labour, various Portfolio Committees and the Office of the Presidency by October 2012. The CRL Rights Commission published its recommendations on 17 April 2013, including the scrapping of some existing public holidays to free up days for some non-Christian religious public holidays.

=== Norway ===
The common practice of schoolchildren visiting local churches for Christmas services in December is opposed by the Norwegian Humanist Association, the Children's Ombudsman and by the Union of Education. There have been several local controversies over the issue. The political parties have mostly been in favor of this being decided by the schools themselves, but the government has underlined that schools who participate in Christmas services must offer an alternative for pupils who do not want to attend and that services must not take place on the day that marks the closing of schools before the Christmas holiday. The Solberg's Cabinet says in its government declaration that it looks positively upon schools taking part in services in churches before religious holidays.

According to a 2013 poll by Norstat for Vårt Land, 68% of Norwegians support having school-arranged Christmas services, while 14% are opposed. 17% do not hold any opinion on the issue.

=== Sweden ===
A 2011 school law stating that public schools should be non-confessional led to debate over what this meant for the tradition that schools gather in churches in December to celebrate Advent, Lucia or Christmas. Eighty thousand Swedes signed a 2012 protest letter (Adventsuppropet) initiated by the newspaper Dagen to Minister for Education Jan Björklund, demanding that school visits to churches should still be allowed to include religious rituals. The minister clarified that church visits before Christmas might include the singing of Christmas hymns and a priest talking about the Christmas gospel, but common prayers and reading a Confession of Faith would violate the law.

In 2012, Sveriges Radio reported that about one in six schools had changed the way they mark Christmas traditions as a result of the new law.

== Christmas tree ==
In 2007, U.S. hardware store chain Lowe's published a catalog that accidentally referred to Christmas trees as "family trees".

The Soviet Union, and certain other Communist regimes, banned Christmas observances in accordance with the Marxist–Leninist doctrine of state atheism. In the 1920s USSR, the League of Militant Atheists encouraged school pupils to campaign against Christmas traditions such as the Christmas tree and the country rehashed the Christmas tree as the New Year tree, devoid of its Christian associations.

Since the 1980s, there have been instances in the United States and Canada when officials used the term "holiday tree" to refer to what is commonly called a "Christmas tree". Reaction to such nomenclature has been mixed.

In 2005, when the city of Boston labeled their official decorated tree as a holiday tree, the Nova Scotian tree farmer who donated the tree responded that he would rather have put the tree in a wood chipper than have it named a "holiday" tree.

In 2009 in West Jerusalem, the Lobby for Jewish Values, with support of the Jerusalem Rabbinate, handed out fliers condemning Christmas and called for a boycott of "restaurants and hotels that sell or put up Christmas trees and other 'foolish' Christian symbols".

The Brussels Christmas tree in the Belgian capital sparked controversy in December 2012, as it was part of renaming the Christmas Market as "Winter Pleasures". Local opposition saw it as appeasement of the Muslim minority in the city.

Efforts have also been made to rename official public holiday trees as "Christmas trees". In 2002, a bill was introduced in the California Senate to rename the State Holiday Tree the California State Christmas Tree; while this measure did not pass, at the official lighting of the tree on 4 December 2007, California Governor Arnold Schwarzenegger referred to the tree as a Christmas tree in his remarks and in the press release his office issued after the ceremony. Schwarzenegger had previously ended the secular practice of calling it a "holiday tree" in 2004 during the 73rd annual lighting. The name change was in honor of the late Senator William "Pete" Knight. Schwarzenegger said at Knight's funeral that he would change the name back to Christmas tree. Knight had lobbied unsuccessfully to change the name after Governor Davis decided to call it a holiday tree.

The Michigan Senate had a debate in 2005 over whether the decorated tree in front of the Michigan Capitol would continue to be called a holiday tree (as it had been since the early 1990s) or named a Christmas tree. The question was revisited in 2006, when the bipartisan Michigan Capitol Committee voted unanimously to use the term Christmas tree. And in 2007, Wisconsin lawmakers considered whether to rename the tree in the Wisconsin Capitol rotunda, a holiday tree since 1985, the Wisconsin State Christmas Tree.

== Rejection of Christmas among certain groups ==
=== Judaism ===
Jewish theology rejects the divinity of Jesus and that he is the true Messiah, therefore Judaism does not include a Christmas celebration. Many Jewish texts express negative sentiments about Christmas. Nittel Nacht is a term used in historical Jewish literature for Christmas Eve. On this night, many Jews, especially Hasidic Jews, avoid the appearance of celebrating Christmas by avoiding experiencing any joy, refuse to study the Torah, eat garlic to ward off evil spirits and practice sexual abstinence. Medieval apostates such as Johann Pfefferkorn, Julius Conrad Otto, Johann Adrian, and Samuel Friedrich Brenz wrote that the common belief among Jews at the time was that on Christmas Eve, Jesus would wander all the toilets of the world as a punishment for spreading false teachings. They wrote that Jews feared that if Jesus heard them reading the Torah, he would get a respite from his suffering, so they refrained from it. The apostates also wrote about Jews eating a lot of garlic on Christmas Eve to ward off the 'demon' Jesus, as well as Jewish children being hesitant to use the latrine on Christmas Eve from the fear of Jesus reaching out and pulling them in.

=== Islam ===
The celebration of Christmas has occasionally been criticized by Muslims in Turkey. Turkey has adopted a secular version of Christmas and a Santa Claus figure named Noel Baba (from the French Père Noël). During the 2013 holiday season, a Muslim youth group launched an anti–Santa Claus campaign, protesting against the celebration of Christmas in the country. In December 2015, political and religious activists organized protests against the growing influence of Christmas and Santa Claus in Turkish society. In Indonesia, some radicalists have suggested proposing 25 December as "World Moslem Convert Day" (Hari Muallaf Sedunia), even though some people dismiss this idea as both asinine and dangerous.

=== Restorationist Movement ===
Some churches, sects, and communities of the Restoration Movement reject the observance of Christmas for theological reasons; these include Jehovah's Witnesses, Armstrongites, the True Jesus Church, the Church of God (Seventh-Day), the Iglesia ni Cristo, the Christian Congregation in Brazil, the Christian Congregation in the United States, and the Churches of Christ, as well as certain reformed and fundamentalist churches of various persuasions, including some Independent Baptists and Oneness Pentecostals.

== See also ==
- Culture war
- Santa Claus § Opposition from some Christian denominations
