= Starbucks unions =

Unionization efforts at the multinational coffee shop chain

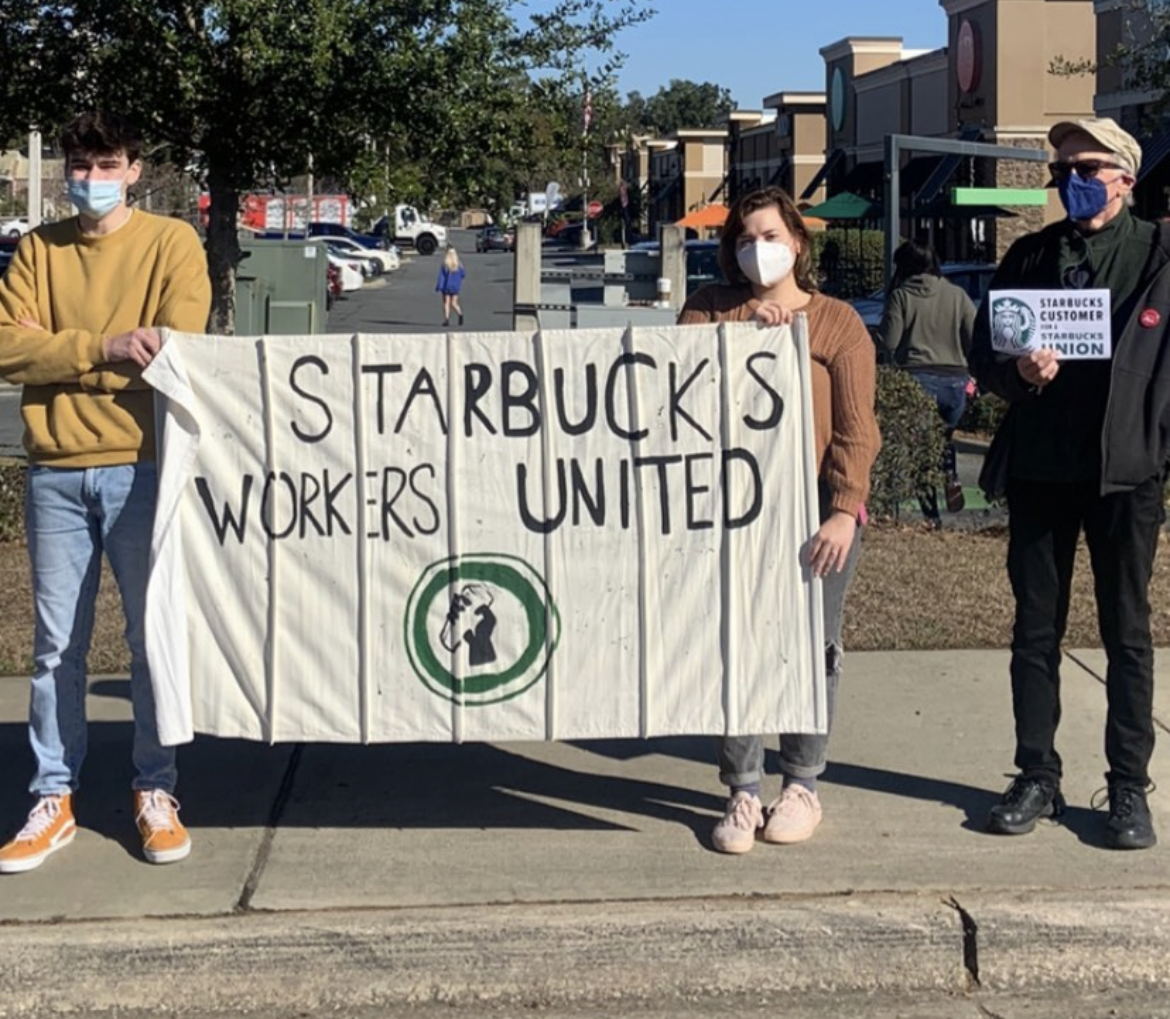
Starbucks workers protesting outside a Tallahassee location

As of June 2026, over 15,000 workers at 706 Starbucks stores in the United States had voted to unionize with Workers United. Workers United and Starbucks have been engaged in negotiations over a national collective bargaining agreement since February 2024. This unionization effort started at a store in Buffalo, New York. About a third of Starbucks' Chilean workforce is already unionized, as well as 450 workers in New Zealand and eight stores in Canada. The longest Starbucks strike lasted 64 days, took place in Brookline, Massachusetts in September 2022 and resulted in the unionization of the employees at that location.

Starbucks Workers United (SBWU) has conducted strikes at over 190 store locations for more than 450 total days striking. The largest strike action to date was on March 22, 2023, where 117 union locations staged the "One Day Longer, One Day Stronger" strike to commemorate outlasting interim-CEO Howard Schultz, who resigned prior to the Senate HELP committee hearing on union busting sanctioned by Schultz.

Previously in the United States, there had been inconsistent unionization efforts beginning in the 1980s. Many of those unions folded, in part due to the company's long history of opposing unionization efforts. Warehouse and roasting plant workers in Seattle were Starbucks first to unionize in 1985. During contract negotiation, the bargaining unit expanded to include store workers but the same workers moved to decertify their representation within two years.

Starbucks stores and a distribution plant unionized in British Columbia in the mid-1990s through the mid-2000s. The company strongly opposed unionization efforts in the 2000s through present day, with multiple National Labor Relations Board complaints ending in settlements or findings of labor law violations. The Industrial Workers of the World led an organizing campaign in the mid-2000s based in New York City that did not result in union recognition.

In December 2021, the Elmwood Avenue store in Buffalo became the first location in the United States to unionize in the 2020s. The first union vote in Starbucks' hometown of Seattle was unanimously in favor of the union.

== Historical unionization ==
=== United States ===
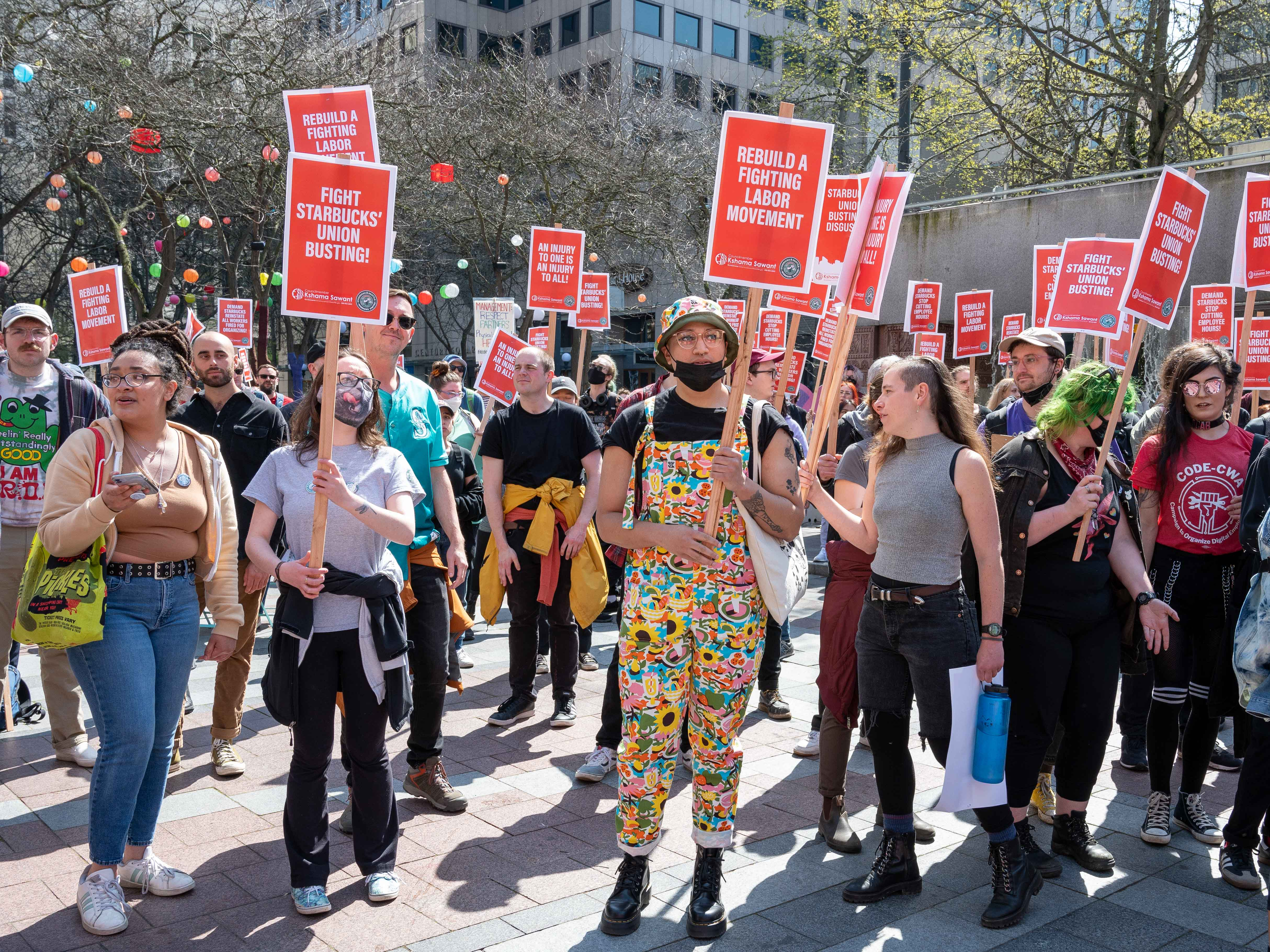
Starbucks workers rally and march in Seattle.

Starbucks workers first voted to unionize with United Food and Commercial Workers (UFCW) Local 1001 in March 1985. The unit included about 120 people. Their contract, secured in 1986, brought health care coverage, paid vacation, and sick leave to Starbucks part-time workers in Seattle and its suburbs. Howard Schultz has claimed credit for initiating "the first company in America to provide comprehensive health insurance to part-time people" despite that when Schultz became president of the company in 1987, he reneged on his pledge to honor that contract, and that it had been the standard for more than a decade prior for UFCW part-timers. In new negotiations, Schultz wanted to expand the warehouse and roasting plant bargaining unit to include workers from the 11 Starbucks stores. This approach intended for the larger, diluted unit to reject the union but backfired when the store workers did the opposite. Schultz proposed reductions in medical benefits, work hours, just-cause termination protections established in the prior contract. These negotiations, interrupted by a movement to decertify the union, did not result in a collective bargaining contract.

One store employee, Daryl Moore, together with signatures of other workers opposed to the union, successfully moved to decertify the union in late 1987. The union for warehouse and roasting plant workers was also decertified in 1992. While company president Schultz wrote that the company had no involvement in the employee's decertification filing, local union leaders said that the company management had made the decertification filing and hired anti-union consultants and lawyers to help. In his 1997 memoir, Pour Your Heart Into It, Schultz defended his decisions saying, "If [Starbucks workers] had faith in me and my motives, they wouldn't need a union."

In 2014, Starbucks workers started two petitions on Coworker.org, one demanding the company overturn its "no-tattoo policy", and the other to better scheduling practices.

Between 1992 and 2021, the only unionized Starbucks employees were those who worked for other companies with unionized labor and a licensing agreement, such as those who operated kiosks in unionized supermarkets.

On March 29, 2023, Howard Schultz testified in front of the US Senate Labor Committee. Schultz was asked by US Senator Bernie Sanders to respond to the ruling National Labor Relations Board (NLRB) Judge Michael Rosas had made regarding Starbucks unionization. Rosas had said that "Starbucks had displayed "egregious and widespread misconduct"" in responding to the unionization efforts in Buffalo, New York. Rosas ordered that Schultz must read the employees of Starbucks their rights or be present at a meeting where those rights are read. Schultz said he would not comply with this ruling "...because Starbucks Coffee did not break the law." On April 26, 2023, US labor board prosecutors indicated that the corporate leadership of Starbucks had not collectively bargained fairly with 144 unionized Starbucks cafes by essentially having "failed and refused" to negotiate with the unions which represent those sites. Furthermore, the NLRB has made 80 claims that Starbucks has engaged in anti-union activity including threats to shutdown stores, and terminating employees because of their unionization activities.

==== Industrial Workers of the World ====
In 2004, Industrial Workers of the World (IWW or Wobblies) led a grassroots campaign called "Starbucks Workers Union" in which workers across a number of cities, including Chicago, Illinois and New York City started organizing unions. The IWW, which works outside the mainstream American labor movement, intended to prove that unions could break into the fast food industry. In New York City in 2006, four Manhattan stores ran an unsuccessful union drive with the campaign. The workers cited unlivable wages and difficulty securing enough hours to earn health benefits. The campaigns led to a series of NLRB cases that uncovered how corporate executives coordinated to fill union-supporting stores with anti-union hires.

In 2008, the NLRB found that during the campaign, Starbucks committed 30 labor violations, including unlawfully terminating and threatening to discharge other union organizers to ward off union activity, unlawful surveillance and interrogation, and prohibiting the workers from discussing the union on their breaks. Starbucks denied any wrongdoing, and one charge that an employee was fired for organizing, to be rehired with back pay, was reversed on appeal. A 2007 complaint to the Occupational Safety and Health Administration about animal and insect infestation found other violations but no health hazards.

Barista Erik Forman at the Mall of America 1 Starbucks in Bloomington, MN was fired and then reinstated in 2008 under an NLRB settlement of a complaint of being fired for organizing. In a 2019 Philadelphia union drive, the company fired two organizing employees, which the labor board ruled unlawful. Starbucks appealed the verdict. In June 2021, the company was again found to have been engaged in certain unfair labor practices in the case.

=== Canada ===
When 12 stores and a distribution plant in Vancouver, British Columbia unionized in the late-1990s with Canadian Auto Workers, Starbucks extended the contract to non-union stores to mitigate unionization incentives, which it tried to undo in the subsequent contract. Western Canada union representation ended in the mid-2000s. More Starbucks stores unionized in Canada. A Quebec City store briefly unionized in 2009 through the IWW.

In August 2020, a Victoria store joined United Steelworkers as the only unionized store in the country. Among their top grievances were COVID-19 pandemic safety precautions. They signed a three-year agreement in 2021.

Starting in 2023, with a store in Waterloo joining the United Steelworkers union, Ontario became the third Canadian province to have unionized locations. This breakthrough was followed with rapid expansion in the following year, with successful union votes in Kitchener, Ajax, and Toronto. Later that year, a store in Chicoutimi, Quebec, unionized under the banner of the CSN, finally signing their first collective bargaining agreement in November 2024.

=== Chile ===
Starbucks workers in Chile formed the Sindicato de Starbucks Coffee Chile union in 2009. In 2011, the 200 workers of the union went on strike for better wages and health care, the first strike in the company's history. Their leaders began a hunger strike after receiving no corporate response from two weeks of striking. At the time, Chile had the company's largest union population, including about 30% of its 670 workers since the company entered the country in 2003. American IWW Starbucks Workers Union employees planned a "global week of action" in solidarity with the unaffiliated Chilean union. The union signed a contract with Starbucks in 2015. In March 2025, the union went on a 25 day strike. As of February 2026, two-thirds of Starbucks workers in Chile are members of the union.

=== New Zealand ===
Unite, a new union in New Zealand, led demonstrations against Starbucks in 2005 and negotiated a contract with the country's Starbucks operator offering 450 workers better pay and hours.

== Starbucks Workers United ==
Starbucks Workers United
- Formation: 2021
- Founded at: Buffalo, New York
- Location: United States
- Members: 706 stores 15,272 workers
- Parent organization: Workers United
- Website: sbworkerunited.org twitter.com/SBWorkersUnited

Workers from the Elmwood Avenue Starbucks store in Buffalo, New York, voted to unionize in late 2021, making it the only unionized shop among the chain's 9,000 company-owned stores in the United States. Two other Buffalo stores voted concurrently, of which one voted to unionize and the other did not. The workers joined Workers United of the Service Employees International Union. They sought to redress issues of under-staffing and under-training, issues that have been long associated with the company and exacerbated during the COVID-19 pandemic. The successful union vote was recognized as a symbolic victory for the American labor movement and came during a time of heightened unionization activity in the country in an industry known for low unionization rates (1.2% of American food service workers).

During the union drive, the company sent other managers and executives, including its North America retail president, to Buffalo to engage with employees about operational issues and participate in their work. Employees were forced to attend captive audience meetings that contained anti-union messages. Starbucks temporarily closed some area stores for remodeling and added excessive staff to one of the stores preparing to vote. Workers said this reduced union support there, while Starbucks said the support was meant to compensate for increased sick leave during the pandemic as it had done elsewhere in the country.

The company also requested that all 20 Buffalo-area stores vote simultaneously, as close to half of area employees worked at more than one store that year. This approach generally works against unionization and would have expanded the voting pool from 81 employees to 450. The NLRB sided against the company twice, letting stores vote as individual units and not delaying the vote count further. The ballot was conducted by mail. Separately, workers filed a NLRB complaint of company intimidation and surveillance to discourage the union drive. Prior to the vote's scheduling, Starbucks announced a minimum wage increase to $15 per hour and pay raises for tenured workers. Starbucks is represented by Littler Mendelson.

Starbucks workers union petitions over 2021–2022

Inspired by the success at Elmwood in Buffalo, union organizing drives proliferated across the United States. At the beginning of November 2021, workers at three other Buffalo locations had filed petitions with the NLRB for union votes. In early January 2022, the number of stores that had filed petitions extended outside of the Buffalo area and the state of New York increased to more than 10. By the end of that January, more than 50 company-owned Starbucks stores in locations across the United States had petitioned for union recognition. By mid-February, the number increased to more than 70 across 20 states, and by the end of the month, to more than 100 stores across 25 states. In mid March 2022, the number grew to more than 150. Vice described the union drive as among the most promising initiatives to rebuild what had been a declining American labor movement.

The NLRB certified the first union outside of the Buffalo area on February 25, 2022, with a Mesa, Arizona location voting 25 to 3, with 3 votes being challenged. On March 22, 2022, the first Seattle store voted to unionize, with the workers voting unanimously in favor of the union. By May 27, 2022, a total of 100 stores voted in favor of unionizing; 200 stores had organized by late July. Workers and the NLRB at the challenged stores alleged stores that voted majority against unionizing were due to union busting, an allegation which Starbucks denies. In September 2023, an NLRB judge found that Starbucks had violated labor law when it had announced pay raises only for non-union employees. As of August 2026, 15,272 workers at 706 Starbucks stores in the United States had voted to unionize, the vast majority under Starbucks Workers United.

=== Lawsuits and boycott ===
On October 9, 2023, two days after the 2023 Hamas-led attack on Israel, Starbucks Workers United reposted an image of a bulldozer tearing down a portion of Israel's border fence with the caption, "Solidarity with Palestine!" The post was shortly removed. Starbucks alleges that it received more than one thousand complaints and some threats against employees from customers who believed that Starbucks endorsed the message. After the union refused to stop using the company name and a similar logo, Starbucks filed suit for trademark infringement. Starbucks Workers United counter-sued Starbucks, alleging that the company had defamed it by implying that it supports terrorism. A consumer boycott ensued against Starbucks, reportedly contributing to an $11 billion loss in market value.

In August 2026, Starbucks Workers United called for a boycott of Starbucks to pressure it to sign a labor contract with the union.

== Strikes ==
Since January 2022, Starbucks Workers United has conducted strikes at over 400 store locations for more than 1,000 total days striking.

=== 2022 strikes ===
The longest Starbucks union strike in 2022 lasted 64 days, beginning on July 11, 2022, and ending on September 15, 2022, at the 874 Commonwealth Avenue location in Brookline, Massachusetts in the United States. This particular strike was sparked by a new policy that would require workers to adjust their schedules to meet a minimum availability of hours. This strike remained the longest duration strike in the campaign history until the Red Cup Rebellion of 2025-2026, which lasted three months and spread over hundreds of Union store locations. The workers at this Starbucks walked out on July 11, 2022 (when the policy was to take effect), picketing at the entrance for 64 days.

Starbucks Workers United also organized major nationwide strike actions on November 17, 2022, called the "Red Cup Rebellion" to disrupt business on Starbucks' largest single-day sales event, "Red Cup Day." 105 store locations participated in this single-day strike.

SBWU also organized a three-day strike the weekend before Christmas holiday, 2022 across 100 store locations, which the campaign dubbed the "Double Down Strike."

The largest strike action to date on the SBWU campaign was on March 22, 2023, where 117 union locations staged the "One Day Longer, One Day Stronger" strike to commemorate outlasting interim-CEO Howard Schultz, who resigned prior to the Senate HELP committee hearing on union-busting sanctioned by Schultz.

=== 2023 LGBTQ pride display strike ===
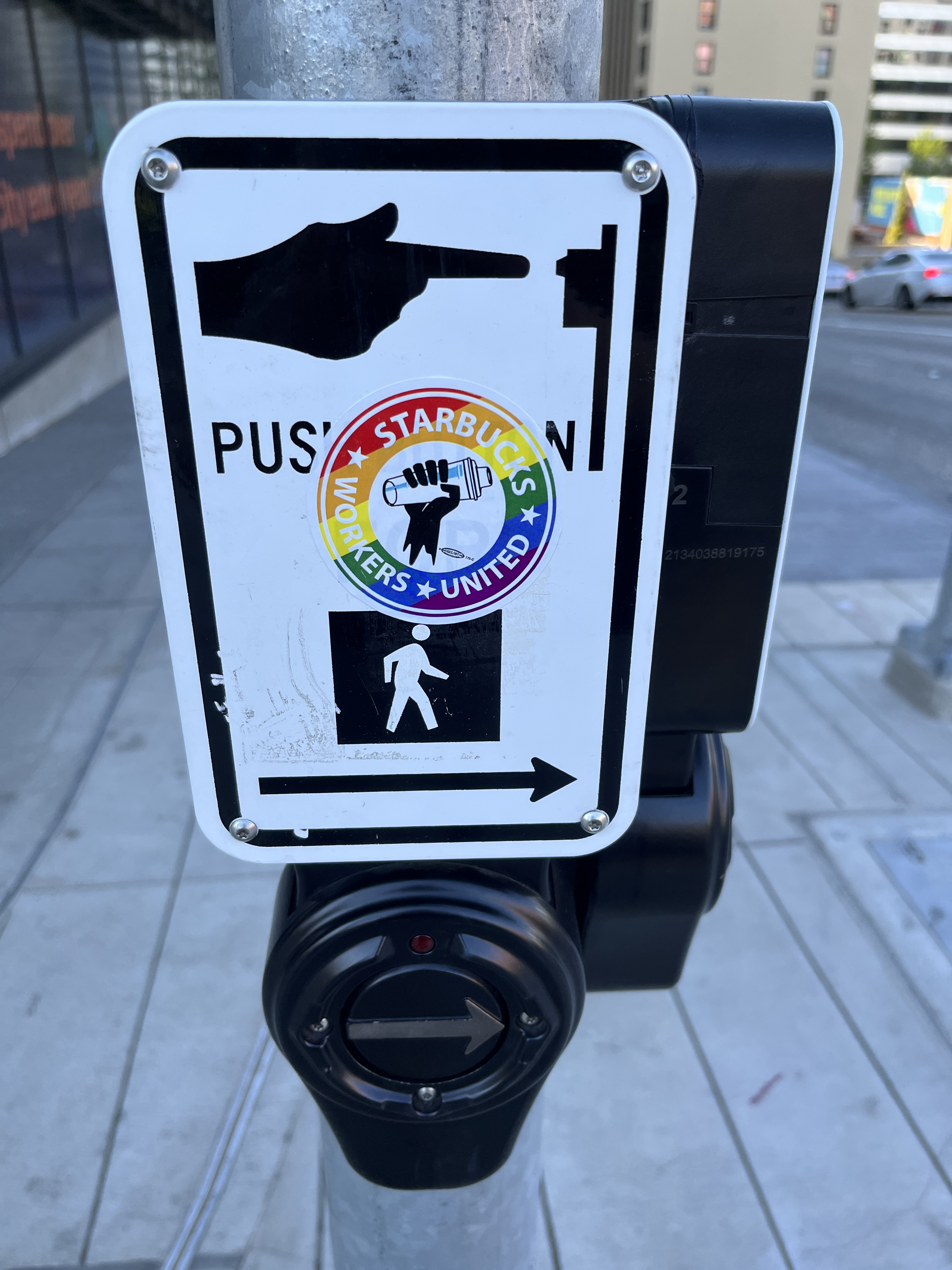
Rainbow-colored Starbucks Workers United sticker on a crosswalk sign in Seattle, Washington, in June 2023

On June 23, 2023, Starbucks Workers United led workers at 150 Starbucks stores across the United States on a week-long, staggered strike to protest the company's removal of and ban on LGBTQ pride displays. The strike followed an unfair labor practices charge, filed June 7 with the National Labor Relations Board, regarding the alleged worsening treatment of LGBTQ employees. On June 26, Starbucks issued a press release promising to offer clearer guidelines surrounding the LGBTQ display policy.

=== 2025 strike ===
Before the 2025 strike, twenty-six U.S. Senators and eighty-two U.S. Representatives signed letters to Starbucks CEO Brian Niccol, demanding that Starbucks reach a contract with its workers. Elected officials such as Zohran Mamdani (then mayor-elect of New York City), Katie Wilson (then mayor-elect of Seattle), and Brad Lander (then comptroller of New York City) have also supported the strike. In early November, 92% of unionized Starbucks workers voted to authorize an open-ended strike if a contract with Starbucks was not finalized. On November 13, 2025, Starbucks Workers United launched an unfair labor practice strike involving over 1,000 workers in more than 40 US cities on Starbucks' annual "Red Cup Day", while also urging customers to boycott the company as part of a "No Contract, No Coffee" campaign. A week later, the strike had grown to include more than 2,000 workers in 65 US cities. The strike started with a wave of 65 stores. Thirty more stores went on strike on November 20, 2025, bringing the total number of Starbucks locations on strike to 95.

On November 19, 2025, in Pennsylvania, hundreds of baristas and supporters blockaded the largest Starbucks distribution center in the country. This prevented deliveries to stores across the Northeastern U.S. Labor historian Kate Bronfenbrenner noted that the economic, legal and political climate had changed since the union of bargain 2024, as a loosening of regulations from an "anti-union administration" had emboldened Starbucks to refuse to bargain for a first agreement.

== Union busting ==
Starbucks has fought and strongly opposed unionization for decades.

Union organizers across the United States accused the company of a strong union-busting campaign during the Workers United campaign during 2021 and 2022. In early February, Starbucks fired multiple leaders of a Memphis, Tennessee, store's unionization efforts for breaking company store access policy, which the union described as an act of retaliation. A judge ruled in August 2022 that the firings were illegal and ordered Starbucks to reinstate the workers. Workers also alleged that Starbucks terminated other workers in the Buffalo stores. Baristas in Denver, Colorado, went on strike on March 11, 2022, due to what they alleged were threats to their job security and benefits if they petitioned to form a union. In the spring of 2022, Vice News obtained a leaked memo from Starbucks management telling baristas in Olympia, Washington, that "benefits and wages will essentially be frozen" during collective bargaining that could take a year or longer "if a contract is reached at all." In May 2023, Starbucks closed every store in Ithaca, New York, one year after it became the first U.S. city in which all its locations were unionized. In September 2024, an administrative law judge ordered Starbucks to reopen two of its three Ithaca locations due to Starbuck's unlawful retaliation against its previously shuttered union stores.

=== Memphis Seven / Starbucks Corporation v. McKinney, No. 23-367 ===
In February 2022, seven Memphis, Tennessee employees known for their efforts at unionization were fired, ostensibly for violating security and safety policies by letting a TV crew enter a closed store. Both the fired employees and the National Labor Relations Board argued that the firing was retribution for their unionization efforts. In August 2022, the NLRB got a federal judge to issue an injunction requiring Starbucks to reinstate the workers.

Starbucks appealed the ruling, and in the US Supreme Court case 'Starbucks Corporation v. McKinney, No. 23-367', Starbucks argued that the standards by which judges issue these types of injunctions varies across the states, and that the standards to issue injunctions for labor law cases were lower than the standards used for other types of law, and that the higher standards should be used. On June 13, 2024, the court unanimously agreed with Starbucks' position, and returned the case to the lower courts.

== See also ==
- Amazon worker organization
- Apple worker organizations
- REI worker organization
- List of Starbucks union petitions
