= Joshua Feuerstein =

American evangelical Internet personality

Joshua Kane Feuerstein
- Born: January 7, 1981 (age 45); Stanislaus County, California, U.S.
- Spouse: Jessica Reynolds (m. 2014)
- Children: 6
- Parents: Thomas K Feuerstein (father); Kathleen Ashworth Feuerstein (mother)

Joshua Feuerstein (born January 7, 1981) is an American right-wing evangelical internet personality. Feuerstein received media attention in 2015 for posting videos on social media wherein he discussed then-recent events such as same-sex marriage legislation in the United States and Starbucks' red holiday cups, and is known for his opposition to COVID restrictions, gun control measures, and what he views as America's obsession with arguments about race.

== Life and career ==
Feuerstein was born on January 7, 1981, in Stanislaus County, California. He married Jessica Reynolds in 2014, and the couple have six children. Feuerstein and his family reside just outside of Forney, Texas. He is of Jewish descent.

=== Online videos ===
==== Bakery video ====
Feuerstein first received media attention in April 2015 after he posted a video where he denounced Cut the Cake, a bakery in Longwood, Florida. In the video, Feuerstein stated that he had called the bakery on April 1, 2015, and asked them to make a cake with an anti-gay marriage message on it. After the owner refused, Feuerstein posted the video and encouraged his followers to call the bakery themselves and show what he said was hypocrisy. This resulted in his followers attacking the bakery's Facebook page, including posting one-star reviews. Feuerstein later removed the video and stated that he had done this as part of a social experiment on religious freedom. Cut the Cake commented on his video, stating that his video had hurt their business and that they had received death threats over his actions. The bakery held an Indiegogo crowdfunding campaign, through which they raised over $13,000.

==== Second Amendment video ====
Feuerstein received more media attention in July 2015 after uploading a video that some media outlets such as Salon and Logo TV implied that he was encouraging followers to use violent actions against backers of anti-discrimination measures and legalized same-sex marriage. In the video, Feuerstein cited several media cases to back up claims that there were attacks on Christianity, such as claims that owners of the Hitching Post Wedding Chapel were going to face jail time and fines if they did not perform same-sex marriages. Towards the end of the video, Feuerstein stated "They are coming after our First Amendment constitutional rights. Well, check this out. This is one pastor that will not bow. Why? Because my First Amendment right is guaranteed by my Second Amendment right." The Advocate heavily criticized Feuerstein, calling the video "disturbing". Writers for The Advocate and HuffPost also asserted that several of his claims were inaccurate.

==== Planned Parenthood video ====
On July 29, 2015, Feuerstein also uploaded a video onto the video-sharing website Vimeo, in which he is shown saying, "I say, tonight, we punish Planned Parenthood. I think it's time that abortion doctors should have to run and hide and be afraid for their life." [sic] The original video was taken down on November 30, 2015, in the aftermath of the Colorado Springs Planned Parenthood shooting but it was saved and reposted on YouTube by several others.

==== Starbucks video ====
In November 2015, Feuerstein posted a video on Facebook criticizing Starbucks for removing Christmas-related symbols from its seasonal cups in favor of a solid red design. The video made national headlines and Feuerstein appeared on CNN that same month. In his appearance, he stated that his post was not just about the Starbucks cup, adding, "The silent majority is sick and tired of consistently being bullied to be quiet about our beliefs and trying to remove Christ out of Christmas." He appeared alongside radio personality Pete Dominick, who heavily criticized Feuerstein and stated that his energy would have been better spent feeding the homeless, which he stated would accomplish Feuerstein's point "without all the hatred and bigotry and cynical self-promotion".

=== 2021 storming of the United States Capitol ===
On January 5, 2021, Feuerstein spoke at a rally in D.C. where he and a number of other anti-abortion pastors, including Pastors Ken Peters and Jon Schrock, spoke in support of Donald Trump's false claims that election fraud happened during the 2020 United States presidential election. During his speech, Feuerstein specifically talked about Mike Pence's role in the following day's counting and claimed he would not refuse to certify the election "like the little coward, the little swamp monster, the little slimeball he is." Feuerstein would go on to condemn Senators Ben Sasse, Mitt Romney, and Mitch McConnell for allowing the "steal" to happen. Feuerstein concluded his speech by saying, "It is time for war! And let us stop the steal!" As a result of his participation in this rally, Feuerstein was suspected of inciting the insurrection attempt that happened the following day, as many of the attendees at the January 5 rally were arrested during the following day's events. In a televised interview with Newsmax, Feuerstein said that he had been contacted by the FBI and was under investigation.

=== 2024 Texas House of Representatives Run ===
On December 5, 2023, Feuerstein announced that he would be running for the Texas House of Representatives in the 4th House of Representatives district against incumbent Keith Bell in the 2024 election.

=== 2026 Facebook post about daughter with Down syndrome ===
On July 9, 2026, Feuerstein made a Facebook post where he used the ableist slur retard and compared the intelligence of his daughter with Down syndrome to Democratic Party voters. Feuerstein wrote "I have a Down Syndrome daughter and still use the word "RETARD". Why? My daughter is not a retard. She has never voted for a Democrat and never will. THOSE people are retards."
