= List of Starbucks union petitions in the United States =

Following a successful union vote at Buffalo, New York, locations of the multinational coffeehouse chain Starbucks, multiple other company-owned locations began petitions for union elections.

== List ==
At least 206 company-owned Starbucks stores have publicized their petitions for a union ballot in the United States.

Location	City/Metropolitan	State	Petition date	Vote count date	Result
Elmwood Village (Elmwood Avenue)	Buffalo	New York	August 30, 2021	December 9, 2021	For union
Genesee Street	Buffalo (Cheektowaga)	New York	August 30, 2021	December 9, 2021	For union
Camp Road	Buffalo (Hamburg)	New York	August 30, 2021	December 9, 2021	Against union
Transit Road	Buffalo (Depew)	New York	November 9, 2021	March 9, 2022	For union
Sheridan & N. Bailey	Buffalo (Amherst)	New York	November 9, 2021	March 9, 2022	For union
Walden & Anderson	Buffalo (Cheektowaga)	New York	November 9, 2021	March 9, 2022	For union
Power & Baseline	Mesa	Arizona	November 18, 2021	February 25, 2022	For union
Commonwealth Avenue	Boston (Allston)	Massachusetts	December 13, 2021	April 11, 2022	For union
Harvard Street	Boston (Brookline)	Massachusetts	December 13, 2021	April 11, 2022	For union
Broadway & Denny Way	Seattle (Capitol Hill)	Washington	December 20, 2021	March 22, 2022	For union
Merchant Drive	Knoxville	Tennessee	December 27, 2021	March 29, 2022	For union
Rock Creek Circle	Denver (Superior)	Colorado	December 30, 2021	April 22, 2022	For union
N. Wabash Avenue	Chicago (Loop)	Illinois	December 30, 2021	June 7, 2022	Against union
Logan & California	Chicago (Logan Square)	Illinois	January 7, 2022	June 7, 2022	Against union
Willamette	Eugene	Oregon	January 7, 2022	April 13, 2022	For union
W. 6th Street	Cleveland	Ohio	January 10, 2022	May 24, 2022	For union
Denow Road	Hopewell	New Jersey	January 11, 2022	April 25, 2022	For union
N. Monroe Street	Tallahassee	Florida	January 11, 2022	May 3, 2022	For union
55th & Woodlawn	Chicago (Hyde Park)	Illinois	January 14, 2022	June 7, 2022	For union
Downtown La Grange	Chicago (La Grange)	Illinois	January 14, 2022	May 6, 2022	Against union
Poplar & Highland	Memphis	Tennessee	January 17, 2022	June 7, 2022	For union
Crismon & Southern	Mesa	Arizona	January 18, 2022	March 25, 2022	For union
Midlothian Turnpike and Carmia Way	Richmond (Chesterfield Towne Center)	Virginia	January 19, 2022	April 20, 2022	For union
Forest Hill Avenue	Richmond	Virginia	January 19, 2022	April 20, 2022	For union
Cleveland Circle	Boston (Brighton)	Massachusetts	January 19, 2022	May 3, 2022	For union
Western Avenue	Boston (Allston)	Massachusetts	January 19, 2022	May 3, 2022	For union
Beth Israel Deaconess Medical Center	Boston	Massachusetts	January 19, 2022	May 3, 2022	For union
N. Charles Street	Baltimore (Mid-Town Belvedere)	Maryland	January 20, 2022	April 25, 2022	For union
Ocean & Water	Santa Cruz	California	January 21, 2022	May 11, 2022	For union
Brookline Avenue	Boston	Massachusetts	January 21, 2022	May 11, 2022	For union
Mount Auburn	Watertown	Massachusetts	January 21, 2022	May 3, 2022	For union
Westlake Avenue	Seattle	Washington	January 25, 2022	June 6, 2022	Against union
Fifth & Pike	Seattle	Washington	January 25, 2022	June 6, 2022	For union
East Colfax Avenue	Denver	Colorado	January 27, 2022	May 10, 2022	For union
Washtenaw Avenue	Ann Arbor	Michigan	January 28, 2022	June 7, 2022	For union
Hall Road	Clinton Township	Michigan	January 28, 2022	June 9, 2022	For union
S. Saginaw Street	Grand Blanc	Michigan	January 28, 2022	June 9, 2022	Against union
9th Street	Philadelphia	Pennsylvania	January 28, 2022	May 22, 2022	For union
Callowhill Street	Philadelphia	Pennsylvania	January 28, 2022	May 25, 2022	For union
Commons	Ithaca	New York	January 31, 2022	April 8, 2022	For union
College Avenue	Ithaca	New York	January 31, 2022	April 8, 2022	For union
Meadow Street	Ithaca	New York	January 31, 2022	April 8, 2022	For union
Monroe & Clover	Rochester (Brighton)	New York	January 31, 2022	April 7, 2022	For union
Mount Hope Avenue	Rochester	New York	January 31, 2022	April 7, 2022	For union
Mission & Dufour	Santa Cruz	California	January 31, 2022	May 11, 2022	For union
75th & I-35	Kansas City (Overland Park)	Kansas	January 31, 2022	April 8, 2022	For union
Country Club Plaza	Kansas City	Missouri	January 31, 2022	June 9, 2022	Withdrawn
Walker Road	Beaverton	Oregon	January 31, 2022		For union
Cedar Hills Boulevard	Beaverton	Oregon	January 31, 2022		For union
7th & Washington	Eugene	Oregon	January 31, 2022	April 28, 2022	For union
Oakway Center	Eugene	Oregon	January 31, 2022	April 28, 2022	Against union
Franklin & Villard	Eugene	Oregon	January 31, 2022	April 28, 2022	For union
37th & Broadway	Everett	Washington	January 31, 2022	June 1, 2022	For union
Delaware & Chippewa	Buffalo	New York	January 31, 2022	April 7, 2022	
Garden Home Road	Portland	Oregon	January 31, 2022		For union
Ocean Street	Santa Cruz	California	February 1, 2022	May 24, 2022	For union
Mason & Lassen	Los Angeles (Chatsworth)	California	February 2, 2022	June 29, 2022	For union
Market Street	Philadelphia (Center City)	Pennsylvania	February 3, 2022	May 25, 2022	For union
Walnut Street	Philadelphia (West Philadelphia)	Pennsylvania	February 3, 2022	May 25, 2022	For union
Lake Lansing Road	Lansing	Michigan	February 4, 2022	June 9, 2022	For union
S. State Street	Ann Arbor	Michigan	February 4, 2022	June 7, 2022	For union
South University Avenue	Ann Arbor	Michigan	February 4, 2022	June 7, 2022	Against union
South Main Street	Ann Arbor	Michigan	February 4, 2022	June 7, 2022	For union
Erb Memorial Union	Eugene	Oregon	February 6, 2022	April 28, 2022	For union
Delta & Green Acres	Eugene	Oregon	February 6, 2022	April 28, 2022	For union
Howell Mill Road	Atlanta	Georgia	February 7, 2022	March 29, 2022	Withdrawn
410 & Vance Jackson	San Antonio	Texas	February 7, 2022	June 14, 2022	For union
Zeeb Road	Ann Arbor	Michigan	February 7, 2022	June 7, 2022	For union
Reserve Roastery	New York City (Meatpacking District)	New York	February 10, 2022	April 1, 2022	For union
Ceasar's Bay Shopping Center	New York City (Gravesend)	New York	February 10, 2022	May 3, 2022	For union
Astor Place	New York City (East Village)	New York	February 10, 2022	April 29, 2022	For union
Great Neck Road	Long Island (Great Neck)	New York	February 10, 2022	May 3, 2022	Against union
Liberty Avenue	Pittsburgh (Bloomfield)	Pennsylvania	February 11, 2022	April 13, 2022	For union
University & Main	Peoria	Illinois	February 11, 2022	April 26, 2022	For union
Cedar Avenue and 47th Street	Minneapolis–Saint Paul (Minneapolis)	Minnesota	February 11, 2022	May 2, 2022	For union
Snelling Avenue	Minneapolis–Saint Paul (St. Paul)	Minnesota	February 11, 2022	April 27, 2022	For union
Howell Avenue	Oak Creek	Wisconsin	February 11, 2022	April 27, 2022	For union
Mililani Shopping Center	Oʻahu (Mililani)	Hawaiʻi	February 11, 2022	May 2, 2022	Against union
North Arthur Ashe Boulevard & Myers	Richmond	Virginia	February 14, 2022	April 19, 2022	For union
West Cary Street	Richmond (Carytown)	Virginia	February 14, 2022	April 19, 2022	For union
Westchester Commons	Richmond (Midlothian)	Virginia	February 14, 2022	April 20, 2022	For union
Huguenot Village Shopping Center	Chesterfield County	Virginia	February 14, 2022	April 20, 2022	For union
8 Old Whitmore Ave	Roanoke	Virginia	February 14, 2022	June 27, 2022	For union
Pike Street (Reserve Roastery)	Seattle	Washington	February 14, 2022	April 21, 2022	For union
West 49th Street	Miami (Hialeah)	Florida	February 14, 2022	April 22, 2022	Against union
Massapequa Village Square	Long Island (Massapequa)	New York	February 15, 2022	May 3, 2022	For union
Sherman Oak Place	Raleigh, North Carolina	North Carolina	February 15, 2022	May 3, 2022	Against union
San Jose Blvd and Ricky Drive	Jacksonville	Florida	February 15, 2022	May 10, 2022	For union
Willow Lawn	Richmond	Virginia	February 15, 2022	April 20, 2022	For union
63rd & Grand	Nichols Hills	Oklahoma	February 16, 2022	May 9, 2022	For union
South Magnolia Drive	Tallahassee	Florida	February 16, 2022	May 25, 2022	Against union
I-85 and Pelham Parkway	Greenville	South Carolina	February 16, 2022	May 16, 2022	For union
West Tennessee Street	Tallahassee	Florida	February 16, 2022	May 25, 2022	For union
Foothills Boulevard	Roseville	California	February 16, 2022	April 11, 2022	Withdrawn
Clifton Boulevard	Cleveland	Ohio	February 18, 2022		For union
Mayfield Road	Cleveland	Ohio	February 18, 2022		For union
McDill Crossroads	Plover	Wisconsin	February 21, 2022	May 4, 2022	For union
Scottsdale and Mayo	Phoenix	Arizona	February 22, 2022	May 5, 2022	Against union
S. Main Street	Farmville	Virginia	February 22, 2022	May 3, 2022	For union
Huntsman Square	Fairfax County (Springfield)	Virginia	February 23, 2022	April 14, 2022	Against union
Holman Road	Seattle	Washington	February 24, 2022	April 30, 2022	For union
Northwest Highway	Cary	Illinois	February 24, 2022	April 26, 2022	For union
San Marco	Jacksonville	Florida	February 25, 2022	May 10, 2022	For union
Whitehorse-Mercerville Road	Hamilton	New Jersey	February 25, 2022	May 2, 2022	For union
2 Beechwood Road	Summit	New Jersey	March 2, 2022	May 2, 2022	For union
E. Mitchell Hammock Road	Oviedo	Florida	March 3, 2022	June 9, 2022	For union
SE 28th & Powell	Portland	Oregon	March 4, 2022	May 13, 2022	For union
Amos Hall	Pittsburgh (Oakland)	Pennsylvania	March 4, 2022	May 6, 2022	For union
SW 5th & Oak	Portland	Oregon	March 4, 2022	May 13, 2022	For union
23rd & West Burnside	Portland	Oregon	March 4, 2022	May 13, 2022	For union
NE Grand & Lloyd	Portland	Oregon	March 4, 2022	May 13, 2022	For union
16th Street	Denver	Colorado	March 4, 2022	May 19, 2022	For union
39th Street & Arrowhead Avenue	Kansas City (Independence)	Missouri	March 7, 2022	May 24, 2022	For union
East Grand River Avenue	East Lansing	Michigan	March 7, 2022	June 9, 2022	For union
Miller Road and I-75	Flint	Michigan	March 7, 2022	June 9, 2022	For union
Seventh & Redondo Avenue	Long Beach	California	March 7, 2022	May 13, 2022	For union
Candlewood & Lakewood Boulevard	Lakewood	California	March 7, 2022	May 13, 2022	For union
Burton & Rosemont	Grand Rapids	Michigan	March 7, 2022	May 13, 2022	For union
West 24th & Nueces Street	Austin	Texas	March 8, 2022	June 10, 2022	For union
W Nursery Rd.	Baltimore (Linthicum)	Maryland	March 8, 2022	May 10, 2022	For union
Merrifield & Leesburg	Loudon County (Leesburg)	Virginia	March 8, 2022	April 23, 2022	For union
Downtown Disney	Anaheim	California	March 8, 2022	June 16, 2022	For union
Katella and Anaheim	Anaheim	California	March 8, 2022	June 9, 2022	For union
Gallows and Gatehouse	Falls Church	Virginia	March 8, 2022	April 22, 2022	For union
Classen & Highway 9	Norman	Oklahoma	March 9, 2022	July 7, 2022	Against union
Brookside and Nevada	Colorado Springs	Colorado	March 10, 2022	May 19, 2022	For union
Robert C Daniel Jr. Parkway	Augusta	Georgia	March 14, 2022	April 28, 2022	For union
N Academy Blvd & Flintridge Dr	Colorado Springs	Colorado	March 14, 2022	May 19, 2022	For union
Kingston Pike and Montvue	Knoxville	Tennessee	March 14, 2022	May 26, 2022	For union
Fortress Blvd	Murfreesboro	Tennessee	March 14, 2022	May 27, 2022	Against union
East Houston Street	San Antonio	Texas	March 15, 2022	June 21, 2022	For union
Factory Lane	Louisville	Kentucky	March 15, 2022	May 26, 2022	For union
Curtiss Parkway	Miami Springs	Florida	March 15, 2022	May 10, 2022	For union
23rd and Robinson	Oklahoma City	Oklahoma	March 16, 2022	May 31, 2022	For union
2nd & Central	Los Angeles (Little Tokyo)	California	March 15, 2022	May 23, 2022	For union
Strawberry Village Shopping Center	Mill Valley	California	March 18, 2022	June 6, 2022	Against union
45th Street and N. Lamar Boulevard	Austin	Texas	March 21, 2022	June 3, 2022	For union
East Broad Street	Columbus	Ohio	March 21, 2022		For union
Leetsdale Drive	Denver	Colorado	March 21, 2022	May 19, 2022	For union
East Central Street	Worcester	Massachusetts	March 26, 2022	June 3, 2022	For union
Cooper Point Road NW	Olympia	Washington	March 28, 2022	April 30, 2022	For union
23rd Street	Lawrence	Kansas	March 28, 2022	June 7, 2022	For union
South Lindbergh Boulevard	St. Louis (Ladue)	Missouri	March 29, 2022	June 13, 2022	For union
Schenectady Road	Latham	New York	March 29, 2022	May 17, 2022	For union
East Main Street	Madison	Wisconsin	March 29, 2022	June 30, 2022	For union
Lyndale Ave. and 54th Street	Minneapolis	Minnesota	March 30, 2022	June 14, 2022	Against union
Clares and 41st St	Capitola	California	March 30, 2022	June 6, 2022	For union
NW 36th & May	Oklahoma City	Oklahoma	April 1, 2022	June 14, 2022	For union
Bel Air Plaza	Bel Air	Maryland	April 2, 2022	June 1, 2022	For union
US-50 E & Thompson Creek	Stevensville	Maryland	April 2, 2022	June 1, 2022	For union
Nottingham Square Shopping Center	White Marsh	Maryland	April 4, 2022	June 1, 2022	For union
Pride Drive and Blowing Rock Road	Boone	North Carolina	April 4, 2022	April 30, 2022	For union
Rayzor Ranch	Denton	Texas	April 5, 2022	June 30, 2022	For union
Georgia Ave	Olney	Maryland	April 6, 2022	May 20, 2022	For union
1070 W. Bryn Mawr Ave.	Chicago	Illinois	April 7, 2022	May 25, 2022	For union
Northland Avenue	Appleton	Wisconsin	April 8, 2022	June 16, 2022	For union
3650 Carpenter Rd.	Ann Arbor	Michigan	April 12, 2022	June 7, 2022	For union
20th St. S	Birmingham	Alabama	April 13, 2022	May 26, 2022	For union
South State Street	Westerville	Ohio	April 13, 2022	June 29, 2022	For union
126 Rockland Plaza	Nanuet	New York	April 14, 2022	June 3, 2022	For union
Westbury Plaza	Long Island (Westbury)	New York	April 15, 2022		For union
Iowa and King Street	Bellingham	Washington	April 15, 2022	June 24, 2022	For union
University and Euclid	Tucson	Arizona	April 18, 2022	June 28, 2022	For union
Corbin's Corner	West Hartford	Connecticut	April 18, 2022	June 9, 2022	For union
7700 Maple Street	New Orleans	Louisiana	April 19, 2022	June 4, 2022	For union
Marks and Herndon	Fresno	California	April 22, 2022	July 11, 2022	Against union
Hwy 141 and I-44	Valley Park	Missouri	April 22, 2022	July 7, 2022	For union
3515 University Ave	Madison	Wisconsin	April 28, 2022		Withdrawn
6512 Monona Drive	Monona	Wisconsin	April 28, 2022		Withdrawn
2981 Triverton Pike Drive	Fitchburg	Wisconsin	April 28, 2022	July 11, 2022	Against union
North Ocean Ave	Long Island (Farmingville)	New York	April 29, 2022	July 26, 2022	For union
S. Park Avenue	Winter Park	Florida	May 2, 2022	June 14, 2022	Against union
Alfred Street	Biddeford	Maine	May 12, 2022		For union
3001 Perryville Road	Rockford	Illinois	May 13, 2022	July 21, 2022	For union
Talcottville Road	Vernon	Connecticut	May 18, 2022	July 14, 2022	For union
21st & Amidon	Wichita	Kansas	May 20, 2022	August 1, 2022	Against union
SMU/Mockingbird station	Dallas	Texas	May 25, 2022	July 29, 2022	For union
Belt Line Road	Dallas	Texas	May 25, 2022		TBA
1143 Wantagh Avenue	Long Island (Wantagh)	New York	June 2022	September 7, 2022	For union
1231 Veterans Parkway	Clarksville	Indiana	May 31, 2022	July 29, 2022	For union
2230 Main Street	Green Bay	Wisconsin	October 10, 2022	Nov, 29, 2022	For union
Main Street	Royal Oak	Michigan	October 2022		Withdrawn
Burlington & Clinton	Iowa City	Iowa	March 27, 2023		For union
University & Richmond	San Diego	California		August 4, 2023	For union
Leucadia & I-5	Encinitas	California		May 22, 2023	For union
2111 Central Avenue	Cheyenne	Wyoming	June 27, 2023	July 31, 2023	For union
11538 Page Service Dr	St. Louis	Missouri	June 28, 2023	August 15, 2023	For union
1124 Wallace Rd NW #105	Salem	Oregon	June 29, 2023	August 17, 2023	For union
5500 Connecticut	Washington D.C.	Washington D.C.	June 29, 2023	August 16, 2023	
304 W 8th St	Vancouver	Washington	June 29, 2023	August 16, 2023	For union
9350 SW Beaverton Hillsdale Hwy	Beaverton	Oregon	Jun 29, 2023	August 15, 2023	For union
428 Clairton Blvd	Pleasant Hills	Pennsylvania	Jun 29, 2023	August 15, 2023	Against union
115 S SR 46 Bypass	Bloomington	Indiana	Jun 30, 2023	August 8, 2023	For union
401 Route 10	Ledgewood	New Jersey	July 3, 2023	August 10, 2023	For union
744 Irving Street	San Francisco	California	July 5, 2023	August 11, 2023	For union
2208 Lincoln Highway East	Lancaster	Pennsylvania	July 12, 2023	August 23, 2023	For union
5260 Grant Creek Rd	Missoula	Montana	July 13, 2023	August 16, 2023	For union
646 North Michigan	Chicago	Illinois	July 14, 2023	August 26, 2023	TBA
1082 Tiger Blvd	Clemson	South Carolina	July 17, 2023	August 28, 2023	For union
29 Enon Street	Beverly	Massachusetts	July 26, 2023	September 7, 2023	TBA
305 Harrison Street, Suite 220	Seattle	Washington	August 4, 2023	September 15, 2023	For union
245 W. Jackson	Hayward	California	August 4, 2023	September 8, 2023	Against union
105 Saluda Pointe Court	Lexington	South Carolina	August 9, 2023	September 20, 2023	For union
1450 Travis Boulevard	Fairfield	California	August 22, 2023	September 29, 2023	For union
6564 Tara Boulevard	Jonesboro	Georgia	September 5, 2023	October 11, 2023	For union
