= Jeff Schweitzer =

American non-fiction author (born 1957)

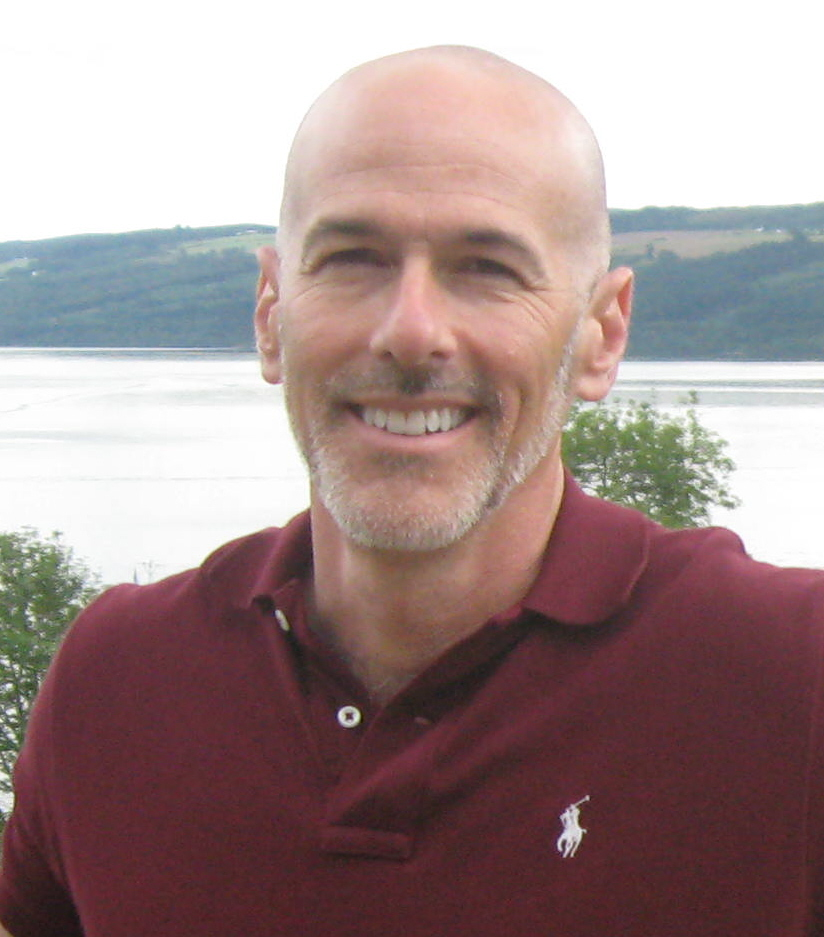
Jeff Schweitzer

Jeff Schweitzer (born 1957) is an American non-fiction author, scientist, political commentator and proponent of scientific skepticism. His published works are largely devoted to the interrelationship between politics, morality, religion and science. He writes for The Huffington Post.

== Early life, education and career ==
Schweitzer was born and raised in Southern California. Schweitzer began his scientific career in the fields of marine biology and neurophysiology. He earned his Ph.D. from Scripps Institution of Oceanography at the University of California, San Diego. Schweitzer joined the Center for the Neurobiology of Learning and Memory at the University of California, Irvine in 1984. While at U.C. Irvine, Schweitzer was selected in 1986 to participate in the Science, Engineering and Diplomacy Fellowship program of the American Association for the Advancement of Science. In 1991 Schweitzer was appointed as the chief environmental officer at the State Department's Agency for International Development.

Schweitzer is the founder of the multi-agency International Cooperative Biodiversity Group Program, a U.S. Government effort to promote the conservation of biodiversity through rational economic use of natural resources. In 1992 he was appointed to the position of assistant director for International Affairs in the White House Office of Science and Technology Policy which is an Executive Office of the President of the United States.

Schweitzer was responsible for providing scientific and technological policy advice and analysis directly to Vice President Al Gore and the director of the OSTP. He worked with President Bill Clinton’s cabinet and 22 U.S. Government technical agencies, and with countries throughout the world, in biology, physics, chemistry, geophysics, agriculture, oceanography and marine sciences. He helped establish the permanent Global Forum on Science and Technology at the Organization for Economic Cooperation and Development to promote greater international scientific collaboration.

== Politics ==
Schweitzer identifies with the moderate left wing of the Democratic Party. According to Schweitzer, “History has shown that Democrats offer stronger support for science than Republicans."

His book, Vote To Save The Planet, was a collection of short articles intended to inform voters about the benefits of electing Barack Obama/Joe Biden and the disadvantages of electing John McCain/Sarah Palin in the 2008 Presidential Election. His criticisms of McCain/Palin were also a major focus of his Huffington Post articles during that time.

Schweitzer contends that the GOP is hostile to environmental regulation, and claims that Republicans and Tea Party enthusiasts have recklessly and irresponsibly attacked reasonable attempts to clean our air.

== Religious views ==
Schweitzer describes himself as a rationalist. He rejects the use of the term atheist, which means without god, because "we cannot be without something that does not exist". He further rejects the idea that his belief system can be defined as the negative of another belief system. According to Schweitzer, "The world should be divided between rationalists and 'arationalists'".

Schweitzer argues that war, overpopulation, poverty, destruction of the environment, intolerance, and indifference to the needs and rights of other life forms all result, to a large extent, from an obsolete religious moral code. Schweitzer claims that the very foundation of our moral code is fundamentally flawed; that the current code of ethics predominant in modern societies, shaped largely by divine command theory (most religion, especially Western religion), is based on false promises of eternal salvation or threats of damnation, not on a morality inherent to the human condition.

== Personal life ==
Schweitzer and his wife, Sally Schweitzer, live in Central Texas, moving there following his service at the White House. Schweitzer is a pilot who owns and operates his personal aircraft. He and his wife Sally are avid scuba divers, often travelling the globe to explore new wildlife.

== Published works ==
- Beyond Cosmic Dice-Moral Life In a Random World (ISBN 0-9819311-0-3 ISBN 978-0-9819311-0-4)
- Vote to Save the Planet (ISBN 4-930813-12-3 ISBN 978-1-935073-00-0)
- Calorie Wars: Fat, Fact and Fiction (ISBN 978-0-9847166-0-9 ISBN 0-9847166-0-2)
- Healing the Heart of the World (ISBN 0-9710888-5-3)
- Global Change of Planet Earth (ISBN 92-64-14069-7 ISBN 978-92-64-14069-1)
- The Dilemma of the Sphinx (ISBN 88-7413-120-8)
- Indo-Pacific Fish Biology (ISBN 4-930813-12-3 ISBN 978-4-930813-12-1)
- Media:Malibu Mirage Magazine – founder, editor and contributor
- Huffington Post – Featured Blogger
