= Starbucks Red Cup =

Promotional marketing campaign and holiday tradition

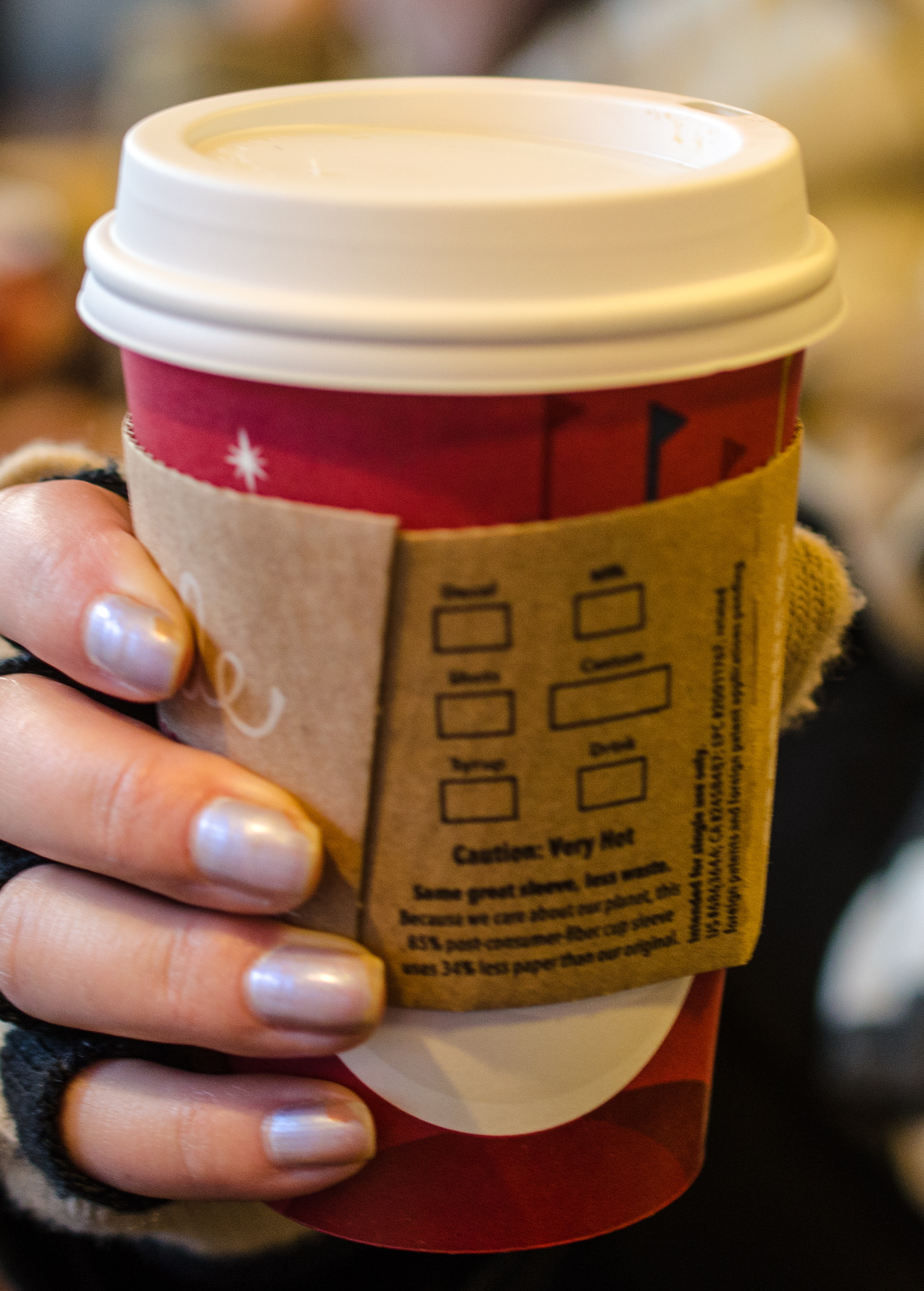
A Starbucks Red Cup in 2012

The Starbucks Red Cup, also called the Starbucks holiday cup, is a modern Christmas and holiday season tradition and promotional campaign operated by coffee chain Starbucks; each winter, only seasonal drinks served at Starbucks cafés will be served in cups with a red background and various festive designs instead of the regular white cups. New designs are used each year. Starbucks have used the campaign to support HIV/AIDS research. In 2015 the cups were plain red without the festive designs, and were accused of being anti-Christian.

== History ==
Starbucks first offered holiday-themed cups in 1997, designed by Sandy Nelson; this cup was not necessarily red, but featured a "jazz-themed design" emulating gift wrap available in different colors. Other designs in the years since include those that have been mostly or entirely green, white, and purple. The company reports that although social media did not exist in 1997, the initial launch still caused buzz. In the 2014 holiday season, an image of a Starbucks red cup was reportedly shared on social media every 14 seconds.

The holiday cups were predominantly red for the first time in 1999. This quickly became a tradition, with the color highlighted in marketing for the cups in 2005 (at "theredcup.com") and 2006 (at "itsredagain.com"). These websites were highly user-active, with promotions, videos, games, tips, quizzes, skills, and other posts every day during the promotional period. Besides online engagement, creative marketing has been used: 2004 red cups were attached to the roofs of taxis, continuing into January 2005, and the cups in 2011 featured augmented reality codes that could be viewed through a branded app on certain devices to see different holiday characters, with customers who unlocked all characters able to receive a free gift.

Further promotions have been offered on anniversaries of the cups. In 2022, to celebrate the 25th anniversary, Starbucks created designs that reflected the gift wrap style of the original. They also featured a shade of peppermint to celebrate the simultaneous 20th anniversary of the Starbucks Peppermint Mocha drink.

According to Ad Age, the Starbucks red cups have been a large factor in the increased presence of commercial Christmas in China. With Starbucks' presence in the 2010s as an aspirational brand, Chinese young adults engaged with the holiday theme and invented Christmas nostalgia through being seen with the red cups.

== Related promotions ==
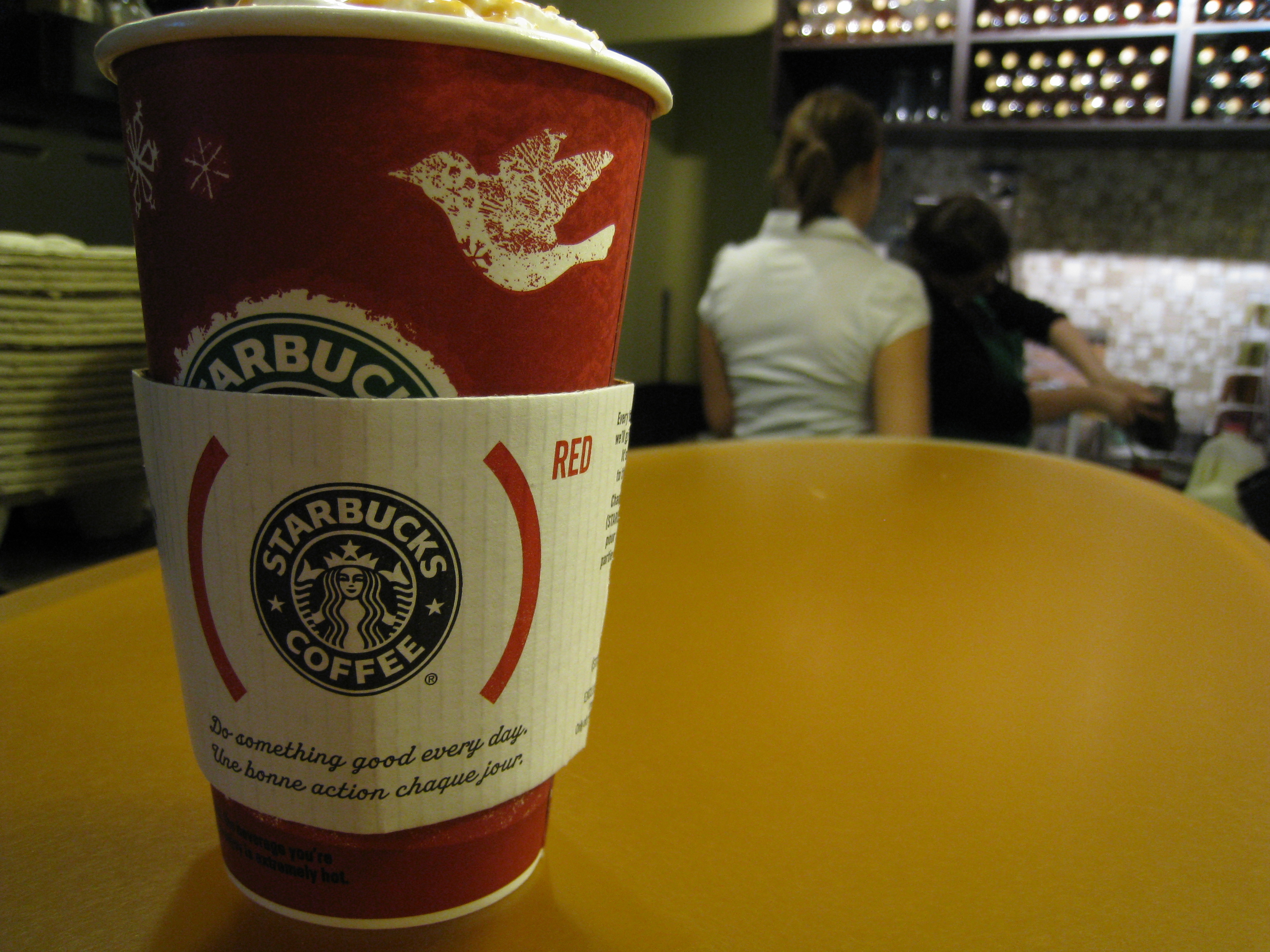
A cup supporting Product Red in 2008

Typically, seasonal drinks coincide with the red cup period, and they are released and promoted together. The launch day of the red cups each year is Red Cup Day, and may see additional Starbucks promotions. The anticipation of Red Cup Day has become an internet phenomenon, with countdowns dedicated to the event; Between 2011 and 2024, "countdowntoredcups.com" tracked the cups' arrival in five countries (United States, Canada, United Kingdom, Ireland, Philippines, and Australia) and the MENA region.

The promotion paired with Product Red in December 2008, using the shared color theme to help raise money for HIV/AIDS research. In December 2010, Starbucks ran the "12 days of sharing" promotion on its website, offering in-store offers as well as continuing to support Product Red. American band the Killers have also produced a Christmas song each year to support HIV/AIDS research, and in 2010 the music video for their song "Boots" was premiered on the Starbucks website on December 1, World AIDS Day. The Starbucks promotions supporting this research donate $0.05 per purchase/per play of the song.

Starbucks partnered with American musician Taylor Swift to promote the release of Red (Taylor's Version) in 2021; the November release coincided with the red cup holiday season and customers were able to order Swift's favorite coffee drink by asking for a "Taylor's Latte". Her music, including the album, were also played inside Starbucks stores.

In 2022, Starbucks held Red Cup Day on November 17, giving free reusable red cups to customers purchasing certain seasonal drinks, as part of their initiative to reduce waste by 50% by 2030.

== Controversies ==
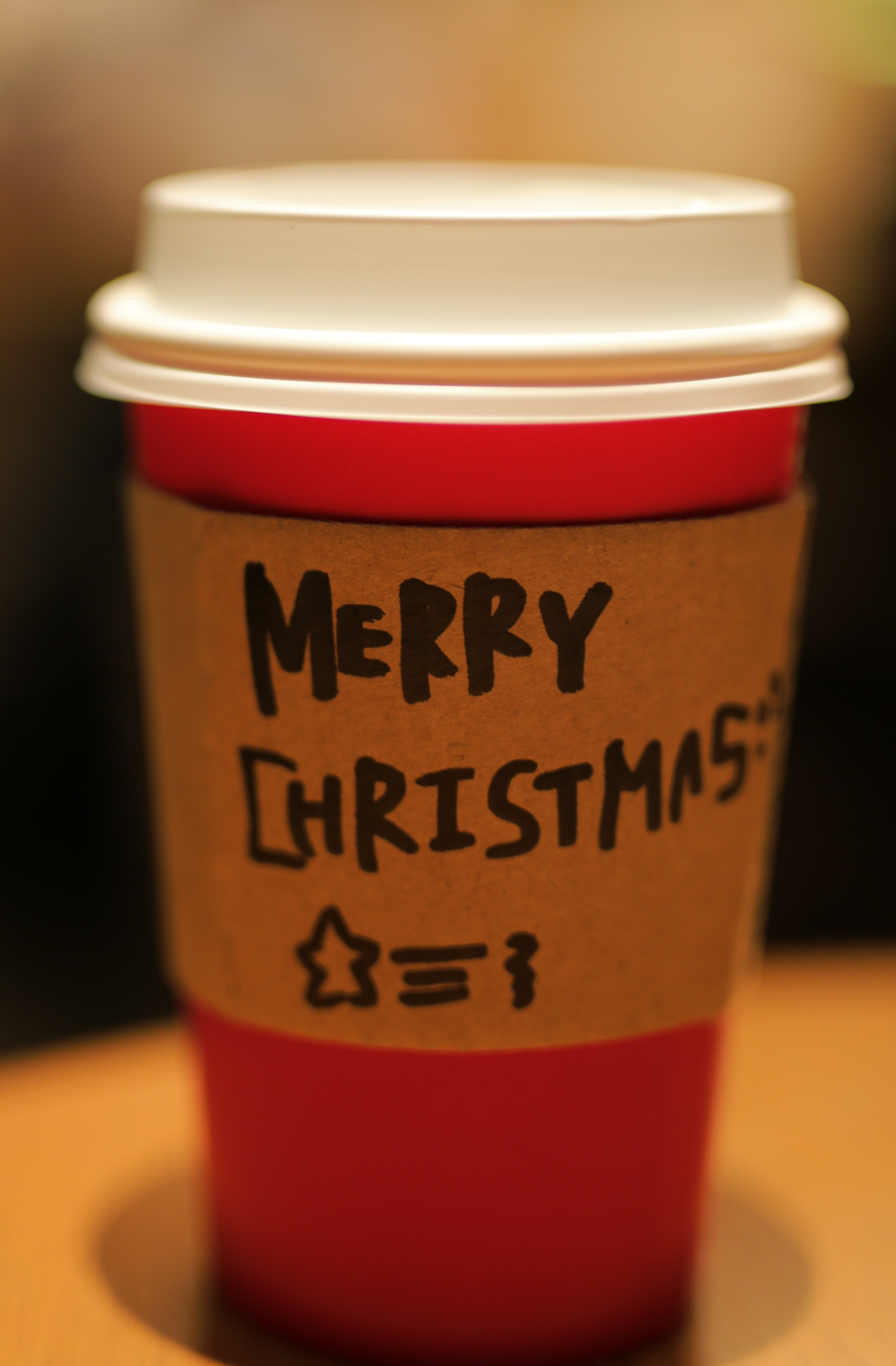
A plain red cup with "Merry Christmas" written on it in 2015

American evangelical far-right commentator Joshua Feuerstein became famous in 2015 when he posted an online rant criticizing Starbucks and calling the company anti-Christian for removing the festive designs from the cups, although the designs had never included Christian imagery and 2014 cups also featured a muted design, with a pine tree in a deeper red shade the only decoration. Then-presidential candidate Donald Trump called for a boycott of Starbucks as a result. Feuerstein suggested that people tell baristas at Starbucks that their name is "Merry Christmas" so that they would have to say it when calling orders; people began trending "#MerryChristmasStarbucks" with this idea. Some people who felt the controversy was unnecessary responded by getting "#ItsJustACup" to trend. The original hashtag was also hijacked by people writing other messages on their cups and sharing them.

There have been criticisms that Starbucks releasing the cups, which are seen as signaling the start of the holiday season, too early in November has helped cause increased Christmas creep.

== Red Cup Rebellion ==
In 2022, Starbucks workers in the United States held a strike on the first Red Cup Day over worker rights, including Starbucks' refusal to cooperate with unions and firing of people involved with Starbucks unions. Approximately 2,000 staff across 25 states joined the strike. The day was reportedly chosen due to it being a highly popular service day, being more taxing on the staff and meaning more to customers who would be affected.

In November 2025, Starbucks Union stores picketed again, as an annual tradition on Red Cup Day. expanding to 65 cities in the U.S. including New York City. Workers United argues that the contract they seek — addressing pay, staffing, and ULPs — would cost the company less than one average day of sales and less than CEO Brian Niccol’s $96 million compensation after four months on the job.
