= CMP =

CMP may refer to:

== Arts and entertainment ==
- Cancionero Musical de Palacio, a Spanish manuscript of Renaissance music
- Chipmunk Punk, a 1990 album by The Chipmunks
- CM Punk (born 1978), American wrestler

== Computing ==
- cmp (Unix), a file-comparison utility
- Certificate Management Protocol, an Internet protocol
- Chip multiprocessor, a CPU die type
- Cloud management platform
- Consent management provider, for HTTP cookies

== Government, law and politics ==
- Câmara Municipal do Porto, Portugal
- Center for Medical Progress, United States
- Communist Marxist Party, India
- Citizens' Municipal Party, Australia (1935–1976)
- Closed material procedures, in UK law courts
- Comparative Manifestos Project, in political science
- Congestion management program, California, US
- Chattogram Metropolitan Police, Bangladesh
- Republican Nation Party (Cumhuriyetçi Millet Partisi), Turkey (1954-1958)

== Medicine ==
- Cardiomyopathy, a heart muscle disease
- Chondromalacia patellae, a degenerative condition of the knee cap
- Chronic myofascial pain, associated with hypersensitive muscular trigger points
- Common myeloid progenitor (CFU-GEMM), a progenitor cell
- Comprehensive metabolic panel, a group of 14 blood tests often used in medical diagnosis
- Cytidine monophosphate, a DNA nucleotide

== Military and firearms ==
- Canadian Military Pattern truck, a truck design in World War II
- Chief of Military Personnel, the senior Canadian Armed Forces officer responsible for the military's human resource programs
- Civilian Marksmanship Program, a U.S. government program that promotes firearms safety training and rifle practice
- Compact machine pistol, a class of firearm that encompasses small fully automatic firearms
- Corps of Military Police, the former name of the Royal Military Police of the British Army

== Science and technology ==
- Camshaft position sensor, an engine sensor that can be used in used in combination with a crankshaft position sensor
- Center for Machine Perception, a research group at Czech Technical University in Prague, Czech Republic
- Chemical-mechanical polishing, a technique used in semiconductor fabrication; also known as planarization
- Command Module Pilot, a position of the Apollo program crewed missions
- Condensed matter physics, a branch of physics
- Conjugated microporous polymer, a type of porous material
- Cytidine monophosphate

== Transport ==
- Copa Airlines, Panama (ICAO: CMP; founded 1944)
- Compagnie du chemin de fer métropolitain de Paris, a Paris Metro operator (1898–1948)
- Chevrolet CMP (or Labo), a pickup truck (made 1991–2021)
- Common Modular Platform, a 2018 Franco-Chinese car design

== Other uses ==
- Central Maine Power, an American utility
- Central Malayo-Polynesian languages, proposed language branch
- Certified Meeting Professional, a certification for event planners
- Company of Mission Priests, an Anglican monastic order
- Compañía Minera del Pacífico, an iron mining company in Chile

== See also ==
- Comp (disambiguation)
- Conflict Management and Peace Science (CMPS), an academic journal
- CPM (disambiguation)
