= Republican Party (United States) =

Political party

- Abbreviation: GOP, R
- Chairperson: Joe Gruters
- Governing body: Republican National Committee
- U.S. President: Donald Trump
- U.S. Vice President: JD Vance
- Speaker of the House: Mike Johnson
- Senate Majority Leader: John Thune
- House Majority Leader: Steve Scalise
- Founders: Alvan E. Bovay; Henry Jarvis Raymond; Horace Greeley; John C. Frémont; Francis Preston Blair; Edwin D. Morgan; Amos Tuck; Salmon P. Chase
- Founded: March 20, 1854; 172 years ago Ripon, Wisconsin, U.S.
- Merger of: Whig Party; Free Soil Party; Anti-Nebraska movement
- Headquarters: 310 First Street SE, Washington, D.C., U.S.
- Student wing: College Republicans; High School Republican National Federation
- Youth wing: Young Republicans; Teen Age Republicans
- Women's wing: National Federation of Republican Women
- Overseas wing: Republicans Overseas
- LGB wing: Log Cabin Republicans
- Registered voters (July 2026): 37.9 million (29.8%) (Note: Only includes voters registered as party affiliates in the District of Columbia and the 32 states which allow voter registration with a specific party. Voters can also register as "independent", which has risen over time. In the United States, voter registration determines eligibility to vote in internal party elections such as primaries, rather than dues-paying membership as in the rest of the world. Voter registration states include Alaska, Arizona, Arkansas, California, Colorado, Connecticut, Delaware, District of Columbia, Florida, Idaho, Iowa, Kansas, Kentucky, Louisiana, Maine, Maryland, Massachusetts, Missouri, Nebraska, Nevada, New Hampshire, New Jersey, New Mexico, New York, North Carolina, Oklahoma, Oregon, Pennsylvania, South Dakota, Utah, West Virginia and Wyoming. The remaining states lean heavily Republican, so the total percentage of the population that is Democrat or Republican is much closer than these values depict.)
- Ideology: Right-wing populism (Note: Includes Trumpism); American neo-nationalism (Note: The GOP is classified as populist-nationalist, more specificly neo-nationalist.); Factions: Conservatism (US) (Note: Political scientists had generally seen the party as upholding American conservatism before 2017; it is now considered a minority view in the party.) (Note: Reagan-era conservatism, generally considered to be a leading faction of the party that is distinct from national-populism, is now a minority. Due to the hegemonic historical influence of classical liberalism on American conservatism, scholars disagree on whether Trumpism is a form of, outgrowth, or deviation away from the ideology, a subject discussed in Max Boot's Reagan: His Life and Legend. The GOP continues to generally adhere to socially conservative positions, and scholars have noted analogies between Trumpism and national conservative parties.); Christian right; Right-libertarianism (US)
- Political position: Right-wing to far-right
- International affiliation: International Democracy Union; Asia Pacific Democracy Union; European Conservatives and Reformists Party (Note: The Republican Party is a "global partner" of the European Conservatives and Reformists Party, a European political party.)
- Caucuses: Republican Governance Group; Main Street Caucus; Republican Study Committee; Freedom Caucus
- Colors: Red
- Senate: 53 / 100
- House of Representatives: 218 / 435 (Note: 218 representatives are members of the party; however, one independent member, Kevin Kiley, caucuses with the Republicans.)
- State governors: 26 / 50
- State upper chambers: 1,117 / 1,973
- State lower chambers: 2,946 / 5,413
- Territorial governors: 2 / 5
- Territorial upper chambers: 15 / 97
- Territorial lower chambers: 9 / 91

Election symbol

Website
- gop.com

The Republican Party, also known as the Grand Old Party (GOP), is a political party in the United States, sitting on the right wing to far-right of the political spectrum. Founded in 1854, it emerged as the main rival of the Democratic Party in the 1850s; the two parties have dominated American politics since then.

The Republican Party was founded by anti-slavery activists who opposed the Kansas–Nebraska Act and the expansion of slavery into American territories. It rapidly gained support in the North, drawing in former Whigs, Free Soilers, and former Know Nothings. Abraham Lincoln's election in 1860 as president led to the secession of Southern states and the outbreak of the American Civil War. Under Lincoln and a Republican-controlled Congress, the party led efforts to preserve the Union, defeat the Confederacy, and abolish slavery. During the Reconstruction era, Republicans sought to extend civil rights protections to freedmen, and by the late 1870s, the party shifted its focus toward business interests and industrial expansion. In the late 19th and early 20th centuries, it dominated national politics, promoting protective tariffs, infrastructure development, and laissez-faire economic policies, while navigating internal divisions between progressive and conservative factions. The party's support declined during the Great Depression, as the New Deal coalition reshaped American politics. Republicans returned to national power with the 1952 election of Dwight D. Eisenhower, whose moderate conservatism reflected a pragmatic acceptance of many New Deal-era programs.

Following the civil rights era, the Republican Party's use of the Southern strategy appealed to many white voters disaffected by Democratic support for civil rights, and de facto flipping two of the parties' voting blocs (African Americans and White Southerners). The 1980 election of Ronald Reagan as president realigned national politics, consolidating a coalition of free market advocates, social conservatives and foreign policy hawks under the Republican banner. Since 2009, a shift toward right-wing populism culminated in the 2016 election of Donald Trump as president, whose leadership style and political agenda—often referred to as Trumpism—reshaped the party's identity and political platform.

The present-day Republican Party is primarily right-wing populist and neo-nationalist, with smaller conservative, Christian right, and libertarian factions, all of which have greatly diminished in influence since 2016. Its ideology has largely shifted towards illiberalism, favoring strong presidential power and a statist government to enforce conservative cultural values. This includes broad opposition to abortion, LGBT rights, immigration, and gun control. On economic policy, it supports tariffs while opposing free trade and labor unions.

During the 20th and early 21st centuries, the Republican Party has cooperated internationally with conservative parties. Since the 2020s it has aligned with global far-right parties, while white nationalist beliefs have become influential within the party, (Note: Multiple sources: Massey, Douglas S. (2021). "The Bipartisan Origins of White Nationalism". Daedalus. 150 (2): Abstract. doi:10.1162/daed_a_01843. ISSN 0011-5266. Archived from the original on January 29, 2026. "Until 2016, this cultivation relied on a dog whistle politics of racially coded symbolic language, but with the election of Donald Trump as president, White nationalist sentiments became explicit and White nationalism emerged as an ideological pillar of the Republican Party."; Ehrenberg, John (May 18, 2022). White Nationalism and the Republican Party: Toward Minority Rule in America (1 ed.). New York: Routledge. doi:10.4324/9781003182962. ISBN 978-1-003-18296-2.; Bartels, Larry M. (September 15, 2020). "Ethnic antagonism erodes Republicans' commitment to democracy". Proceedings of the National Academy of Sciences. 117 (37): 22752–22759. Bibcode:2020PNAS..11722752B. doi:10.1073/pnas.2007747117. PMC 7502764. PMID 32868419.; Olzak, Susan (2023). "Ethno-nationalism and Right-Wing Extremist Violence in the United States, 2000 through 2018". Sociological Science. 10: 197–226. doi:10.15195/v10.a6. "The Republican party has increasingly aligned itself with extremist right-wing views that can be classified as ethno-nationalist (Bonikowski 2017; Thompson 2021)."; Woods, Eric Taylor; Fortier-Chouinard, Alexandre; Closen, Marcus; Ouellet, Catherine; Schertzer, Robert (December 7, 2023). "The Battle for the Soul of the Nation: Nationalist Polarization in the 2020 American Presidential Election and the Threat to Democracy". Political Communication. 41 (2): 173–198. doi:10.1080/10584609.2023.2291150. ISSN 1058-4609.; Manza, Jeff; Crowley, Ned (2018). "Ethnonationalism and the Rise of Donald Trump". Contexts. 17 (1): 28–33. doi:10.1177/1536504218766548. ISSN 1536-5042. "With ethnonationalist sentiment increasingly centered in the GOP base, the possibility of future Trump-like candidacies cannot be discounted."; McClellan, Fletcher; Le, Loan (January 22, 2025), Democratic Theory and the New Undergraduate Political Science Major, doi:10.33774/apsa-2025-1blzz, "Lieberman and Schlozman (2024) categorized the Republican Party as a majority ethnic party, based on white group identity, which executed backsliding behaviors such as vote manipulation and voter suppression."; Velshi, Ali; Ahmed, Amel; Detzel, Allison (November 11, 2025). "As Democrats expand their coalition, Republicans are embracing extremism". MS NOW. "Republicans have become increasingly defined by white Christian nationalism, exclusion and resentment of the nation's pluralism — and they're no longer feeling the need to disguise any of it.") including support for remigration.

== History ==
=== 1850s to 1930s ===
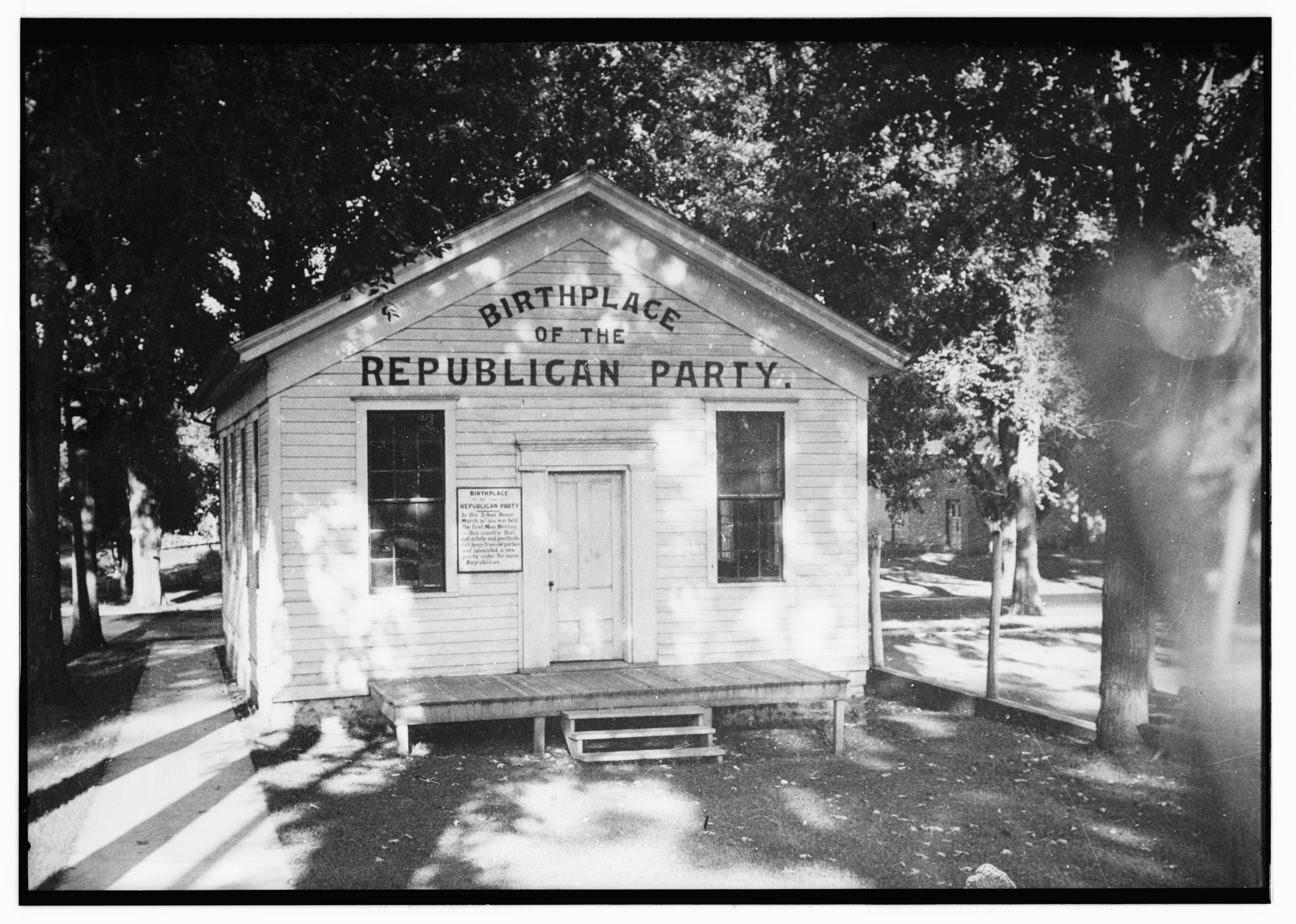
Birthplace of the Republican Party in the Little White Schoolhouse in Ripon, Wisconsin

In 1854, the Republican Party began as an anti-slavery party to combat the expansion of slavery into western territories after the passing of the Kansas–Nebraska Act by the Democrats under Stephan Douglas. The party was formed in the Northern and Border states, but not the South. It rapidly gained support in the North, drawing in former Whigs and Free Soil Democrats. Under the Presidency of Abraham Lincoln it led the successful war effort against the Confederacy.

By 1865 it encompassed northern Protestants, factory workers, professionals, businessmen, prosperous farmers, and also black former slaves. It also included a minority of white Southerners who had opposed the Confederacy—men ridiculed by Democrats as "Scalawags". The great majority of white southerners were Democrats, as were the great majority of Irish Catholics and German Catholics. While both parties adopted pro-business policies in the 19th century, the early GOP was distinguished by its support for the national banking system, the gold standard, railroads, and high tariffs.

The Republican Party largely dominated the national political scene until 1932. However it split in 1912, as former president Theodore Roosevelt formed the liberal Progressive Party to oppose the conservatives under William Howard Taft. The split allowed Democrats under Woodrow Wilson to win in 1912. The GOP lost its congressional majorities during the Great Depression (1929–1940). Under Franklin D. Roosevelt and Harry S Truman, the Democrats formed a winning New Deal coalition that was dominant from 1932 through 1952.

=== Shift rightward ===
After the Civil Rights Act of 1964, the Voting Rights Act of 1965, and the Southern strategy, the party's core base shifted with the Southern states becoming more reliably Republican in presidential politics and the Northeastern states becoming more reliably Democratic. White voters increasingly identified with the Republican Party after the 1960s. Following the Supreme Court's 1973 decision in Roe v. Wade, the Republican Party opposed abortion in its party platform and grew its support among evangelicals. The Republican Party won five of the six presidential elections from 1968 to 1988. Two-term President Ronald Reagan, who held office from 1981 to 1989, was a transformative party leader. His conservative policies called for reduced social government spending and regulation, increased military spending, lower taxes, and a strong anti-Soviet foreign policy. Reagan's influence upon the party persisted into the early 21st century.

Since the 1990s, the party's support has chiefly come from the South, the Great Plains, the Mountain States, and rural areas in the North.

=== Trump era ===
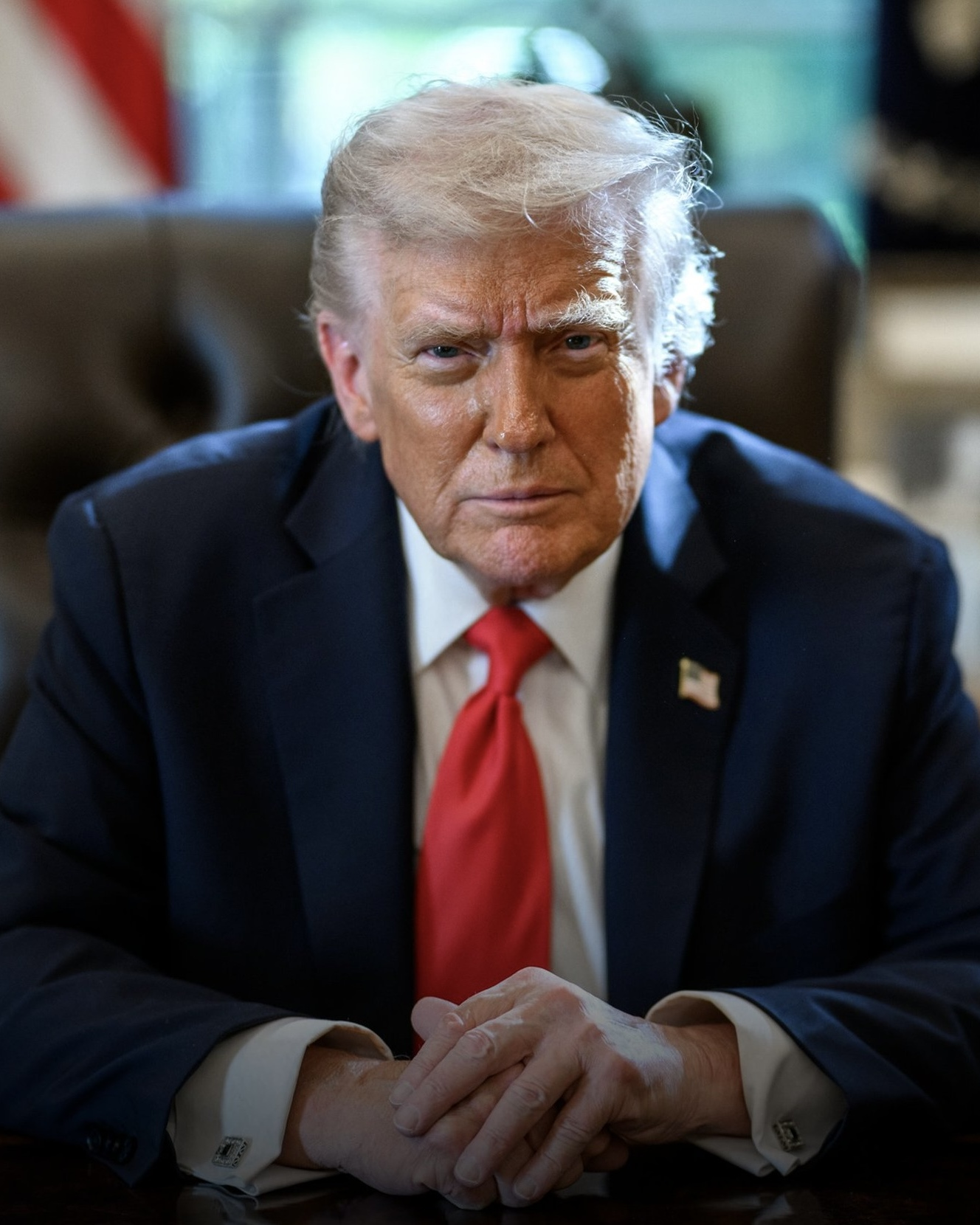
Donald Trump, the 45th (2017–2021) and 47th (since 2025) president

In the 2016 presidential election, Republican nominee Donald Trump defeated Democratic nominee Hillary Clinton. The result was unexpected; polls leading up to the election showed Clinton leading the race. Trump's victory was fueled by narrow victories in three states—Michigan, Pennsylvania, and Wisconsin—that had been part of the Democratic blue wall for decades. It was attributed to strong support amongst working-class white voters, who felt dismissed and disrespected by the political establishment. Trump became popular with them by abandoning Republican establishment orthodoxy in favor of a broader nationalist message. His election accelerated the Republican Party's shift towards right-wing populism (Note: Multiple sources: Hacker, Jacob S.; Pierson, Paul (July 7, 2020). "The origins of the Republican Party's plutocratic populism". The Washington Post. Archived from the original on January 30, 2021.; Bolton, Alexander (July 17, 2023). "GOP senators rattled by radical conservative populism". The Hill. Archived from the original on December 14, 2024.; Lange, Jason; Oliphant, James (March 21, 2024). "Republicans have taken sharp populist turn in the Trump era: Reuters/Ipsos". Reuters. Archived from the original on June 28, 2024.; Cliffe, Jeremy (February 15, 2023). "The strange death of the centre right". The New Statesman. Archived from the original on February 11, 2025. "In Western democracies conventional conservatism is foundering. How did this once-dominant political force become so diminished?") and resulted in decreasing influence among its conservative factions.

After the 2016 elections, Republicans maintained their majority in the Senate, the House, and governorships, and wielded newly acquired executive power with Trump's election. The Republican Party controlled 69 of 99 state legislative chambers in 2017, the most it had held in history. The Party also held 33 governorships, the most it had held since 1922. The party had total control of government in 25 states, the most since 1952. The opposing Democratic Party held full control of only five states in 2017. In the 2018 elections, Republicans lost control of the House, but strengthened their hold on the Senate.

Over the course of his presidency, Trump appointed three justices to the Supreme Court. Trump lost the 2020 presidential election to Joe Biden but refused to concede the race, claiming widespread electoral fraud and attempting to overturn the results. On January 6, 2021, the United States Capitol was attacked by Trump supporters following a rally at which Trump spoke. After the attack, the House impeached Trump for a second time on the charge of incitement of insurrection, making him the only federal officeholder to be impeached twice; however, he was not removed from office. The Senate acquitted him in February 2021, after he had already left office.

Following the 2020 election, election denial became increasingly mainstream in the party, with the majority of Republican candidates in 2022 being election deniers. The party also made efforts to restrict voting based on false claims of fraud. Furthermore, the party began to systematically downplay, deny, or reinterpret controversial actions from Trump's first term, particularly the Capitol attack, regarding which the party has circulated revisionist narratives, some of which are also being presented as official accounts during Trump's second term.

By the early 2020s, the Republican Party had largely shifted towards illiberalism, (Note: Also described as one of the key ideological components of Trumpism. Multiple sources: Tyler Godines Camarillo, C.; Clark Wilson, Walter; Perroud, Jace; VanGoethem, Margaret (January 3, 2026). "The New Republican Revolution: The Implications of Illiberalism and Populism for GOP Politics and Policy". The Roads to Congress 2024: Navigating Elections in an Era of Upheaval. Palgrave Macmillan Cham. pp. 127–151. ISBN 978-3-032-07119-4.; Laruelle, Marlene, ed. (2024). The Oxford Handbook of Illiberalism. Oxford University Press. p. 213-219. ISBN 9780197639108.; "The Republican Party has lurched towards populism and illiberalism". The Economist. October 31, 2020. ISSN 0013-0613. Archived from the original on June 2, 2024. "In the late 20th century the Republican Party already looked a bit less liberal and more populist than most mainstream European parties. But according to the V-Dem Institute's analysis, it only really started to deviate to "illiberalism" when it embraced religious values under Mr Bush after his election in 2000. The party then veered into populism in 2010 with the rise of the Tea Party movement, which vowed to curb what it saw as the unjustifiable expansion of the federal government under Barack Obama. However, the greatest shift, especially towards illiberalism, came with the election of Mr Trump."; Encarnación, Omar G. (June 12, 2023). "Democratic Backsliding: Comparative Reflections on the American Experience". Political Science Quarterly. 138 (3): 407–424. doi:10.1093/psquar/qqad036. pp. 410–423: "Despite the appearance of being consolidated, the American political system is institutionally vulnerable to backsliding—from an electoral system fraught with so many deficiencies that election experts deem it archaic and undemocratic; to an imperial presidency that sits at the center of federal power and towers over the legislature and the judiciary; to the recent transformation of the Republican Party into an illiberal force more interested in acquiring power than in governing. ... The Republican Party's pivotal role in enabling backsliding in the Trump era mirrors the post-Communist experience. In recent years, the Republican party has fashioned itself after the Fidesz Party in Hungary (Europe's most sobering example of backsliding), from embracing the ideology of Christian Nationalism to using the state to fight culture wars to cynically rejecting the idea of democracy. In connection to the last point, a popular argument among Republican election deniers is that the United States is not a democracy but a republic. As noted by the New York Times, "There is more at stake than the health of the Republican Party when its core activists, as well as a growing number of officials and those campaigning for governmental positions, openly espouse hostility not just to democratic principles, but, increasingly, to the word 'democracy' itself." Indeed, this illiberal behavior puts American democracy in peril."; Main, Thomas J. (January 4, 2022). The Rise of Illiberalism. Washington, D.C.: Brookings Institution Press. p. 188. ISBN 9780815738503. Archived from the original on January 28, 2025. "A sharp repudiation at the polls would have checked the vogue for illiberal and identitarian ideologies and driven the Republican party back within the bounds of the liberal democratic political spectrum."; Laruelle, Marlene (March 1, 2022). "Illiberalism: a conceptual introduction". East European Politics. 38 (2): 303–327. doi:10.1080/21599165.2022.2037079. hdl:11385/259401. ISSN 2159-9165. pp. 315–316: "Classical conservatives—such as the Christian Democrats in Europe or the Republican Party in the US before Donald Trump—are/were fervent supporters of political rights and constitutionalism, while illiberalism challenges them ... The struggle of the European People's Party to win concessions from Orbán's Fidesz or the Polish PiS, as well as the subjugation of the Republican Party by Donald Trump, have revealed how attractive illiberal leaders may be to the more mainstream right. As Marc Plattner has stated, the future of liberal democracy will largely depend on how successful or unsuccessful the classical conservative right is at resisting illiberalism."; Cooley, Alexander; Nexon, Daniel H. (January–February 2022). "The Real Crisis of Global Order: Illiberalism on the Rise". Foreign Affairs. Vol. 101, no. 1. New York City: Council on Foreign Relations. ISSN 0015-7120. "The election of Donald Trump in 2016 sparked a major debate over the nature and fate of the liberal international order, suddenly caught, it seemed, between the Charybdis of illiberal great-power challengers and the Scylla of a hostile U.S. president. Trump may have lost the presidency in 2020, but the liberal order remains under threat. ... In the United States, one of the two major political parties remains beholden to an authoritarian demagogue. Motivated by the "Big Lie" (the objectively false claim that Democrats stole the election from Trump through systematic voter fraud), the Republican Party is purging officials who stood in the way of efforts to overturn the 2020 presidential election. Republican voter-suppression efforts are accelerating."; Dunwoody, Phillip T.; Gershtenson, Joseph; Plane, Dennis L.; Upchurch-Poole, Territa (August 9, 2022). "The fascist authoritarian model of illiberal democracy". Frontiers in Political Science. 4 907681. doi:10.3389/fpos.2022.907681. ISSN 2673-3145. p. 12: "All the components of the fascist authoritarian model of illiberal democracy were evidenced in the recent 2020 U.S. presidential election. ... In classic authoritarian fashion, Trump sought to remain in power by asserting his preferred fiction over more objective realities promoted by those in traditional, truth-based professions. Trump engaged in threat othering to work up his base so that they would support the use of force to "save" their country. The result of these combined mechanisms was the support of blatantly illiberal antidemocratic behavior at the U.S. Capitol on January 6, 2021."; Hopkin, Jonathan; Blyth, Mark (2020). "Global Trumpism: Understanding Anti-System Politics in Western Democracies". In Vormann, Boris; Weinman, Michael D. (eds.). The Emergence of Illiberalism. Routledge. ISBN 978-0367366247. Archived from the original on February 15, 2021.; Norris, Pippa (2017). "Online Exchange on "Democratic Deconsolidation" (PDF). Journal of Democracy. 12. pp. 14–15–18: "The rise of populist authoritarianism in the United States, especially by the risks that President Trump poses to core democratic values, practices and institutions, pose major threats to liberal democracy. ... When the populist style of governance is coupled with authoritarian values, however, this potent combination presents most dangerous risk to the principles and practices at the heart of liberal democracy. Trump falls into this category. ... populist-authoritarian forces threatening to dismantle core values in liberal democracy pose the gravest risk, especially in America, given the vast powers of the U.S. presidency and its hegemonic role in the world. The mainstream news media, the courts, and a reenergized civil society are actively pushing back to resist the threats to democracy arising from the Trump administration. In Congress and State Houses, however, the Democrats are decimated, and the Republican party and conservative activists seem willing to be seduced by dreams of power."; Drutman, Lee (June 8, 2021). "The Republican party is now an explicitly illiberal party". The Guardian. ISSN 0261-3077. "Though these anti-democratic sentiments have been building within the ranks of the party for years, the events of 2021 mark the transformation of the Republican party into a genuinely illiberal party, and a grave threat to the continuation of American democracy as we've known it.") with a 2020 study conducted by the V-Dem Institute concluding that it was more ideologically extreme than France's National Rally and similar in its views, rhetoric, actions and practices to authoritarian or far-right parties such as Law and Justice in Poland, Fidesz in Hungary, Justice and Development in Turkey, Bharatiya Janata Party in India, and Alternative for Germany. (Note: Multiple sources: "The Republican Party has lurched towards populism and illiberalism". The Economist. October 31, 2020. ISSN 0013-0613. Archived from the original on June 2, 2024. "In the late 20th century the Republican Party already looked a bit less liberal and more populist than most mainstream European parties. But according to the V-Dem Institute's analysis, it only really started to deviate to "illiberalism" when it embraced religious values under Mr Bush after his election in 2000. The party then veered into populism in 2010 with the rise of the Tea Party movement, which vowed to curb what it saw as the unjustifiable expansion of the federal government under Barack Obama. However, the greatest shift, especially towards illiberalism, came with the election of Mr Trump."; Lührmann, Anna; Medzihorsky, Juraj; Hindle, Garry; Lindberg, Staffan I. (October 2020). "New Global Data on Political Parties: V-Party" (PDF). Briefing Paper No. 9. V-Dem Institute. Archived (PDF) from the original on November 14, 2024.; Drutman, Lee (March 18, 2021). "American Democracy Can't Survive Unless the Far Right Is Marginalized. Here's How to Do It". Time. "By international standards, the current Republican Party is an illiberal anti-democratic nativist global outlier, with positions more extreme than France's National Rally, and in line with the Germany's AfD, Hungary's Fidesz, Turkey's AKP and Poland's PiS, according to the widely respected V-Dem (Varieties of Democracy) Institute."; Kottasová, Ivana (October 26, 2020). "Republicans are starting to look like authoritarian parties in Hungary and Turkey, study finds". CNN. "Experts from the V-Dem Institute at the University of Gothenburg in Sweden said the US Republican Party had become more illiberal and populist in recent decades and that its recent retreat from democratic norms has left it resembling authoritarian ruling parties like Hungary's Fidesz and Turkey's AKP."; "Trump's GOP resembles authoritarian parties in India and Turkey, and Poland, study stays". The Independent. October 26, 2020. "Donald Trump's Republican party has become more illiberal and retreated from upholding democratic norms in recent years, a study has found, with its rhetoric shifting closer that of authoritarian parties ruling in Turkey, Hungary, Poland and India."; Borger, Julian (October 26, 2020). "Republicans closely resemble autocratic parties in Hungary and Turkey – study". The Guardian. ISSN 0261-3077. "In a significant shift since 2000, the GOP has taken to demonising and encouraging violence against its opponents, adopting attitudes and tactics comparable to ruling nationalist parties in Hungary, India, Poland and Turkey.") The United States has experienced substantial democratic backsliding under the two presidencies of Donald Trump, with a majority of political scientists and several democracy indices classifying the country as either having transitioned or being in a phase of transition from a liberal democracy to an illiberal democracy or hybrid regime since 2016. (Note: Multiple sources: "DEMOCRACY REPORT 2026: Unraveling The Democratic Era?" (PDF). V-Dem Institute. March 17, 2026. "One notable shift is the transformation of the Republican Party to endorsing a far-right, nationalist, and anti-pluralist agenda. Nationalist, anti-liberal, far-right parties and leaders have largely driven the "third wave of autocratization." Yet the USA stands out as the only case where such movement seized control over one party in a rigid two-party system."; Klaas, Brian (September 9, 2025). "Is The United States Still A Democracy?". The London School of Economics and Political Science. "Political scientists continue to debate this topic, but few would classify the United States as a robust democracy. It is either a democracy in crisis that is barely clinging onto the label, or one that has tipped over the edge into competitive authoritarianism - and I believe it's the latter."; Grumbach, Jacob M. (December 1, 2021). "Laboratories of Democratic Backsliding". American Political Science Review. 117 (3). Published by Cambridge University Press on behalf of the American Political Science Association: 967–984. doi:10.1017/S0003055422000934. ISSN 0003-0554. "Prominent cross-national measures of democracy from the Varieties of Democracy Project (V-Dem), Bright Line Watch, and Freedom House, which had once ranked the country as a global leader, show a U.S. democracy slipping toward "mixed regime" or "illiberal democracy" status."; Morris, G. Elliott (October 1, 2025). "Experts now rate the U.S. as a "mixed" or "illiberal" democracy". www.gelliottmorris.com.; Langfitt, Frank (April 22, 2025). "Hundreds of scholars say U.S. is swiftly heading toward authoritarianism". NPR. "A survey of more than 500 political scientists finds that the vast majority think the United States is moving swiftly from liberal democracy toward some form of authoritarianism."; Gambino, Lauren (January 21, 2026). "American democracy on the brink a year after Trump's inauguration, experts say". The Guardian. ISSN 0261-3077.; Schenkkan, Nate (January 15, 2026). "Century's New Democracy Meter Shows America Took an Authoritarian Turn in 2025". The Century Foundation. "The Century Foundation's 2025 evaluation finds that American democracy is already collapsing—the Democracy Meter rates the United States at 57/100, a 28 percent drop in just one year. In the first year of Trump 2.0, the United States went from being a passing if imperfect democracy to behaving like an authoritarian state: breaking the law, ignoring court rulings, engaging in grand corruption, targeting critics for persecution, and conducting a campaign against immigrants, in particular, that flagrantly violates civil rights."; "index". Polity data series. "The USA is no longer considered a democracy and lies at the cusp of autocracy; it has experienced a Presidential Coup and an Adverse Regime Change event (8-point drop in its POLITY score).")

Trump easily won the nomination to be the party's candidate again in 2024, marking the third straight election of him being the GOP nominee. Trump achieved victory against Vice President Kamala Harris. He won both the electoral college and a plurality of the popular vote, becoming the first Republican to do so since George W. Bush in 2004, and improving his vote share among working class voters, particularly among young men, those without college degrees, and Hispanic voters. In the 2020s, the GOP increased support among Hispanic and Latino conservatives, black conservatives, and Asian American and Pacific Islander conservatives, although by 2025 research and polling showed prior gains in minority support had significantly decreased.

=== Current status ===
As of 2026, the GOP holds the presidency, and holds 26 state governorships, 28 state legislatures, and 23 state government trifectas. Six of the nine current U.S. Supreme Court justices were appointed by Republican presidents. There have been 19 Republicans who have served as president, the most from any one political party; the most recent being current president Donald Trump, who became the 47th president on January 20, 2025. Trump also served as the 45th president from 2017 to 2021.

During Trump's second term, the GOP has been partially divided on a number of key policies, including tariffs and support for Ukraine in the Russo-Ukrainian war.

== Name and symbols ==
The Republican Party's founding members chose its name as homage to the values of republicanism promoted by the Democratic-Republican Party, which its founder, Thomas Jefferson, called the "Republican Party". The idea for the name came from an editorial by the party's leading publicist, Horace Greeley, who called for "some simple name like 'Republican' [that] would more fitly designate those who had united to restore the Union to its true mission of champion and promulgator of Liberty rather than propagandist of slavery". The name was selected as it "connected voters with the original political organization of Thomas Jefferson in the 1790s, the Democratic-Republican Party". "Republican" has a variety of meanings around the world, and the Republican Party has evolved such that the meanings no longer always align.

The term "Grand Old Party" is a traditional nickname for the Republican Party, and the abbreviation "GOP" is a commonly used designation. The term originated in 1875 in the Congressional Record, referring to the party associated with the successful military defense of the Union as "this gallant old party". The following year in an article in the Cincinnati Commercial, the term was modified to "grand old party". The first use of the abbreviation is dated 1884.

The traditional mascot of the party is the elephant. A political cartoon by Thomas Nast, published in Harper's Weekly on November 7, 1874, is considered the first important use of the symbol. The cartoon was published during the debate over a possible run for a third term by President Ulysses S. Grant. It draws imagery and text from the Aesop fable "The Ass in the Lion's Skin", combined with rumors of animals escaping from the Central Park Zoo. An alternate symbol of the Republican Party in states such as Indiana, New York, and Ohio is the bald eagle as opposed to the Democratic rooster or the Democratic five-pointed star. In Kentucky, the log cabin is a symbol of the Republican Party.

Traditionally the party had no consistent color identity. After the 2000 presidential election, the color red became politically associated with Republicans. During and after the election, the major broadcast networks used the same color scheme for the electoral map: states won by Republican nominee George W. Bush were colored red and states won by Democratic nominee Al Gore were colored blue. Due to the weeks-long dispute over the election results, these color associations became firmly ingrained, persisting in subsequent years. Although the assignment of colors to political parties is unofficial and informal, the media has come to represent the respective political parties using these colors. The party and its candidates have also come to embrace the color red.

Contrarily, the color red tends to represent left-leaning socialist, communist, and labor political movements in many nations, while blue is linked with conservatism.

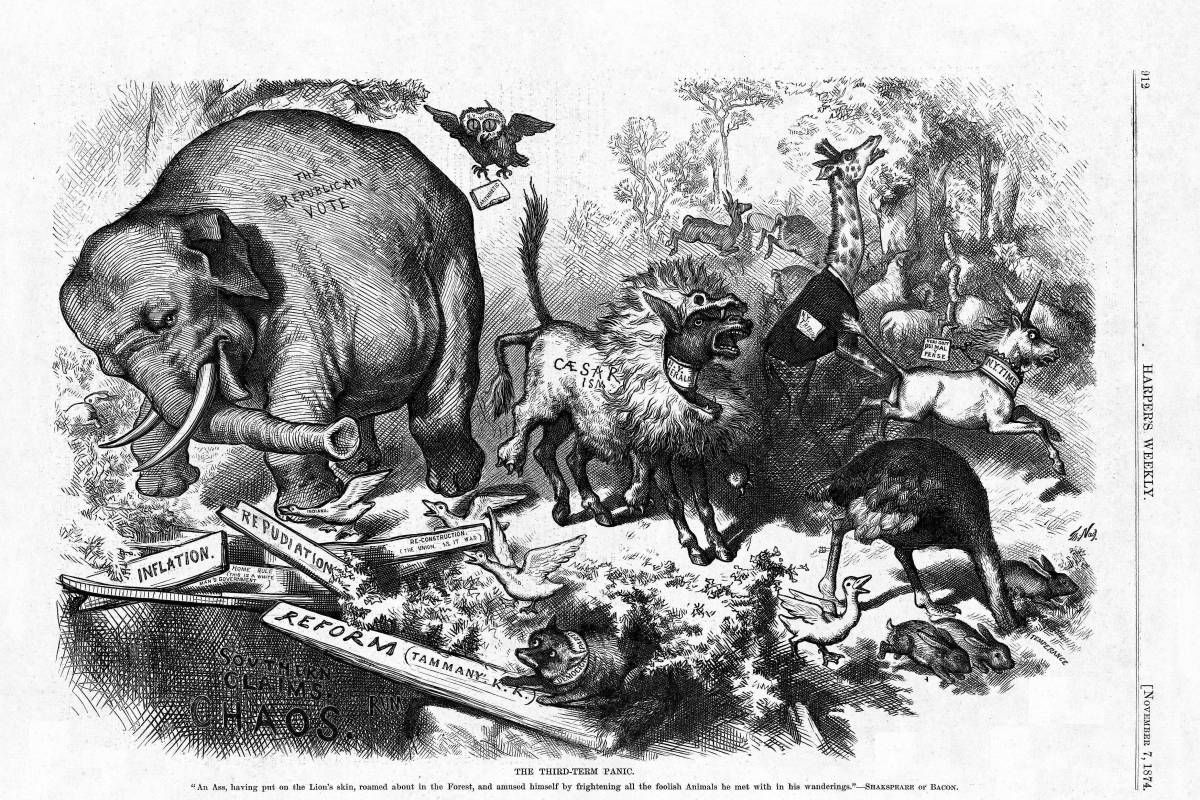
An 1874 cartoon by Thomas Nast, featuring the first notable appearance of the Republican elephant

The red, white, and blue elephant as seen on the GOP website in 2011

The GOP banner logo, c. 2013

A GOP banner logo, c. 2017

== Factions ==
=== Civil War and Reconstruction era ===
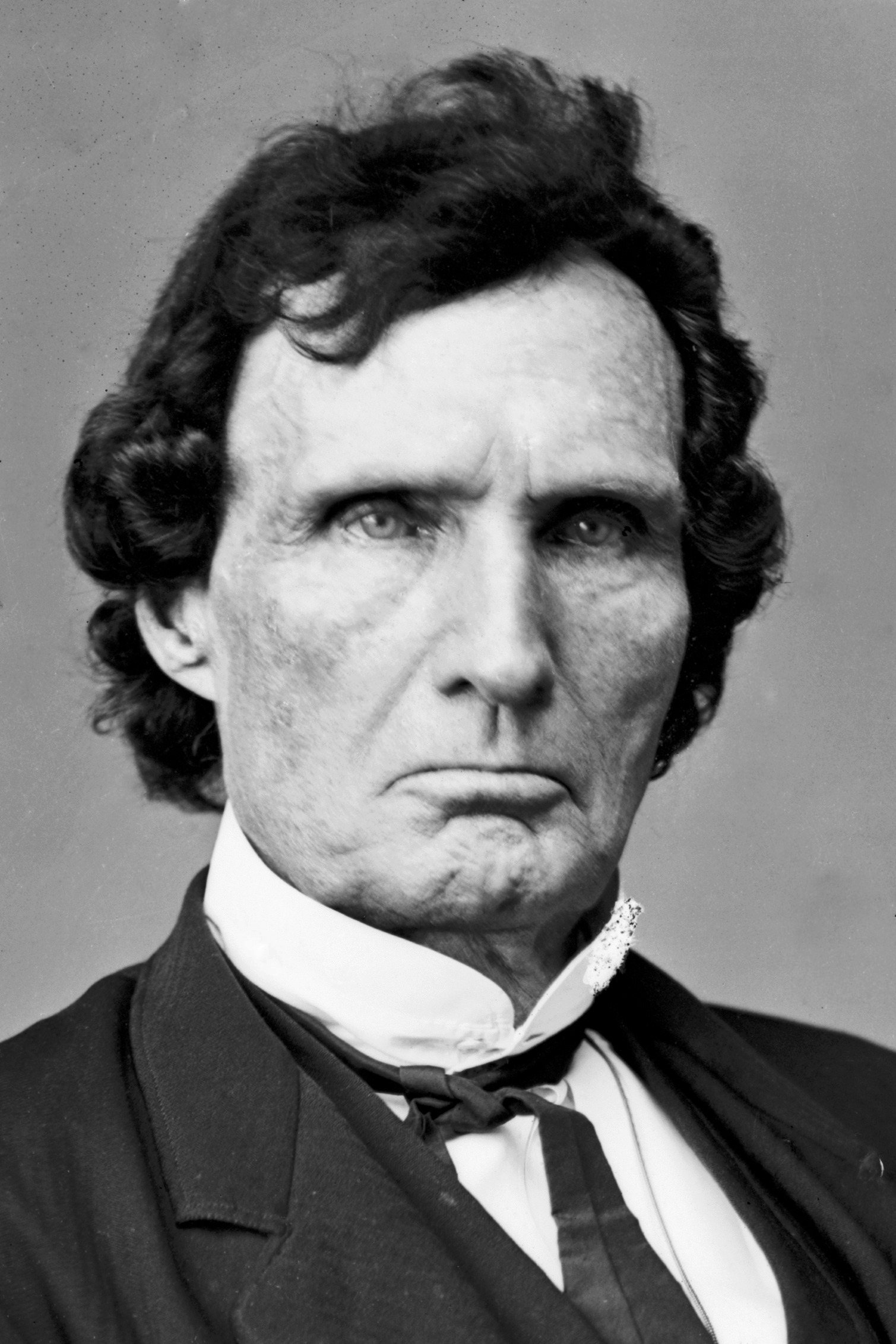
U.S. representative Thaddeus Stevens, considered a leader of the Radical Republicans, was a fierce opponent of slavery and discrimination against African Americans.

The Radical Republicans were a major factor in the party from its inception in 1854 until the end of the Reconstruction Era in 1877. Like the moderate Republicans the radicals strongly opposed the expansion of slavery. Unlike the moderates they were hard-line abolitionists calling for the end of slavery in the South. By 1865 Both factions advocated equal rights for the freedmen. Radicals were heavily influenced by religious ideals and evangelical Christianity. Radical Republicans pressed for abolition as a major war aim and they opposed the moderate Reconstruction plans of Abraham Lincoln as both too lenient on the Confederates and not going far enough to help former slaves. After the war's end and Lincoln's assassination, the Radicals clashed with Andrew Johnson over Reconstruction policy. Radicals led efforts to establish civil rights for former slaves and fully implement emancipation, pushing the Fourteenth Amendment for statutory protections through Congress. They opposed allowing ex-Confederate officers to retake political power in the Southern U.S., and emphasized liberty, equality, and the Fifteenth Amendment which provided voting rights for the freedmen. Many later became Stalwarts, who supported machine politics.

Moderate Republicans were known for their loyal support of President Abraham Lincoln's war policies and expressed antipathy towards the more militant stances advocated by the Radical Republicans. In contrast to Radicals, Moderate Republicans were less enthusiastic on the issue of Black suffrage even while embracing civil equality and the expansive federal authority observed throughout the American Civil War. They were also skeptical of the lenient, conciliatory Reconstruction policies of President Andrew Johnson. Members of the Moderate Republicans comprised in part of the previous Radical Republicans who became disenchanted with the alleged corruption of the latter faction. They generally opposed efforts by Radical Republicans to rebuild the Southern U.S. under an economically mobile, free-market system.

=== 20th century ===
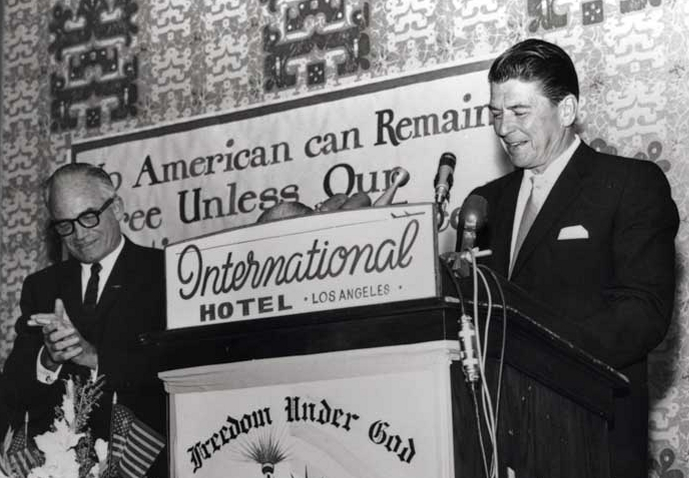
Ronald Reagan speaks in support of Republican presidential candidate Barry Goldwater during the 1964 presidential campaign.

The 20th century saw the Republican party split into an Old Right and a moderate-liberal faction in the Northeast that eventually became known as Rockefeller Republicans. Opposition to Roosevelt's New Deal saw the formation of the conservative coalition. The 1950s saw fusionism of traditionalist and social conservatism and right-libertarianism, along with the rise of the First New Right to be followed in 1964 with a more populist Second New Right.

The rise of the Reagan coalition in the 1980s began what has been called the Reagan era. Reagan's rise displaced the liberal-moderate faction of the GOP and established Reagan-style conservatism as the prevailing ideological faction of the Party for the next thirty years, until the rise of the right-wing populist faction. Reagan conservatives generally supported policies that favored limited government, individualism, traditionalism, republicanism, and limited federal governmental power in relation to the states.

=== 21st century ===
Republicans began the 21st century with the election of George W. Bush in the 2000 United States presidential election and saw the peak of a neoconservative faction that held significant influence over the initial American response to the September 11 attacks through the war on terror. The election of Barack Obama saw the formation of the Tea Party movement in 2009 that coincided with a global rise in right-wing populist movements from the 2010s to 2020s. The global rise in right-wing populism has been attributed to factors including economic insecurity due to financialization, a decline in organized religion, backlash to globalization, and migrant crises.

Right-wing populism became an increasingly dominant ideological faction within the GOP throughout the 2010s and helped lead to the election of Donald Trump in 2016. Starting in the 1970s and accelerating in the 2000s, American right-wing interest groups invested heavily in external mobilization vehicles that led to the organizational weakening of the GOP establishment. The outsized role of conservative media, in particular Fox News, led to it being followed and trusted more by the Republican base over traditional party elites. The depletion of organizational capacity partly led to Trump's victory in the Republican primaries against the wishes of a very weak party establishment and traditional power brokers. Trump's election exacerbated internal schisms within the GOP, and saw the GOP move from a center coalition of moderates and conservatives to a solidly right-wing party hostile to liberal views and any deviations from the party line.

The Party has since faced intense factionalism. These factions are particularly apparent in the U.S. House of Representatives, where three Republican House leaders (Eric Cantor, John Boehner, and Kevin McCarthy) have been ousted since 2009. (Note: Multiple sources: Kane, Paul (October 5, 2023). "McCarthy thought he could harness forces of disruption. Instead they devoured him". The Washington Post. Archived from the original on August 11, 2024. "As far back as 2009, the future House speaker tried to channel the anti-politician, tea party wave building into a political force, but the movement crushed him."; Martin, Jonathan (June 10, 2014). "Eric Cantor Defeated by David Brat, Tea Party Challenger, in G.O.P. Primary Upset". The New York Times. Archived from the original on June 11, 2014.; Lizza, Ryan (December 14, 2015). "A House Divided: How a radical group of Republicans pushed Congress to the right". The New Yorker. Archived from the original on February 7, 2021.; Steinhauer, Jennifer (September 25, 2015). "John Boehner Will Resign From Congress". The New York Times. Archived from the original on March 27, 2021.; "McCarthy elected House speaker in rowdy post-midnight vote". AP News. January 7, 2023. Archived from the original on January 7, 2023.; "Speaker McCarthy ousted in historic House vote, as scramble begins for a Republican leader". AP News. October 3, 2023. Archived from the original on October 3, 2023.) All three of the top Republican elected officials during Trump's first term (Vice President, Speaker of the House, and Senate Republican leader) were ousted or stepped down by Trump's second term.

The party's establishment conservative faction has lost all of its influence. Many conservatives critical of the Trumpist faction have also lost influence within the party, with no former Republican presidential or vice presidential nominees attending the 2024 Republican National Convention.

The victory of Trump in the 2024 presidential election saw the party increasingly shift towards Trumpism, and party criticism of Trump was described as being muted to non-existent. The New York Times described it as a "hostile takeover", and a victory of right-wing populism over the old conservative establishment. Polling found that 53% of Republican voters saw loyalty to Trump as central to their political identity and what it means to be a Republican. During Trump's second presidency, Republican members of Congress were described by political commentators and news media as largely submissive to Trump, letting him dictate policies without pushback.

==== Right-wing populists and Trumpists ====
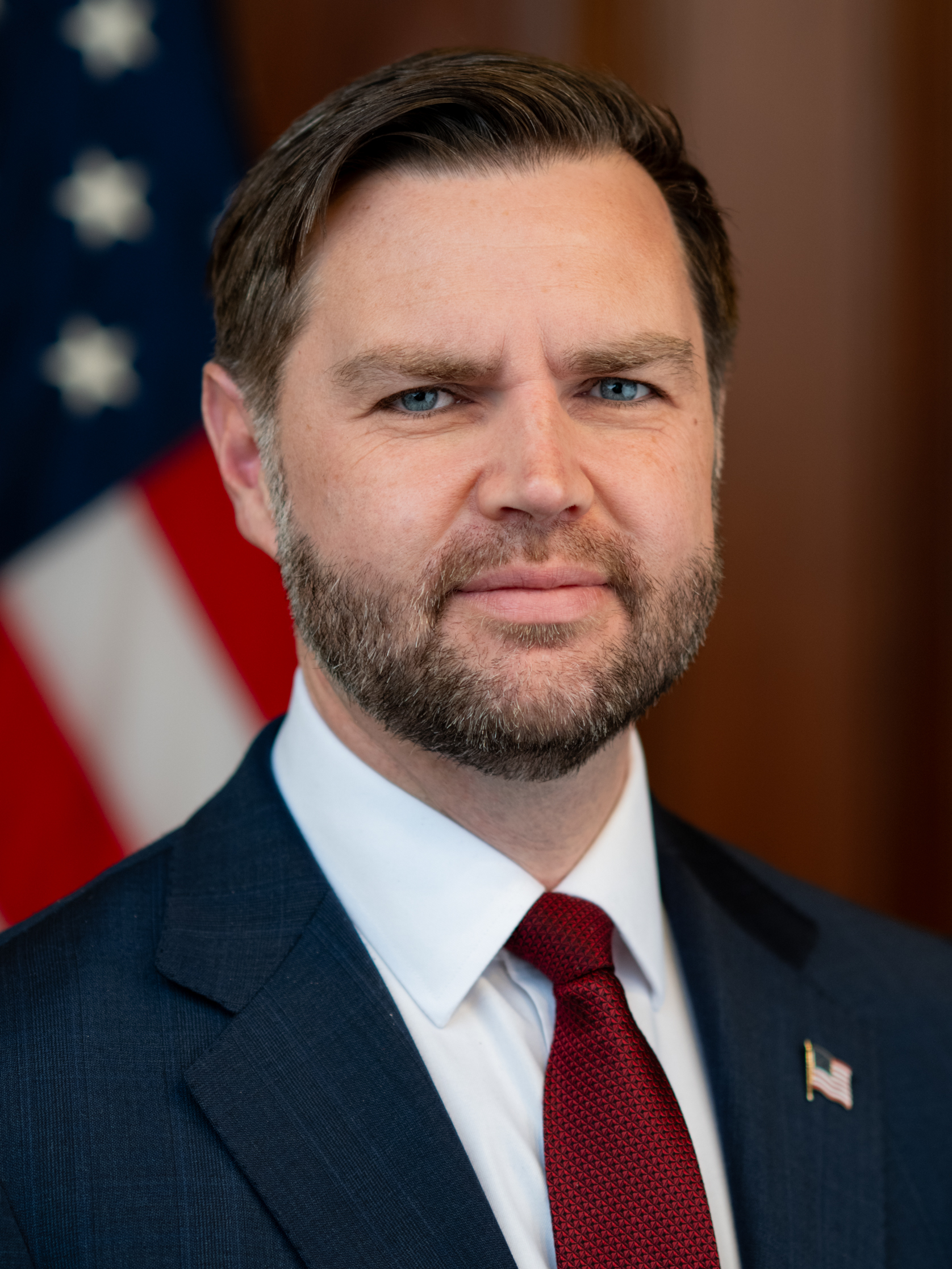
JD Vance, Donald Trump's vice president during Trump's second term. Initially critical of Trump, he became a staunch advocate of Trumpism later in Trump's first term and has been described as a right-wing populist.

Right-wing populism is the dominant political faction of the GOP. Sometimes referred to as the MAGA or "America First" movement, Republican populists have been described as consisting of a range of right-wing ideologies including but not limited to right-wing populism, national conservatism, neo-nationalism, ultraconservatism, mercantilism, and Trumpism. (Note: Multiple sources: Katzenstein, Peter J. (March 20, 2019). "Trumpism is US". WZB | Berlin Social Science Center. Archived from the original on February 15, 2021.; The Christian Science Monitor (November 5, 2020). "Why Trumpism is here to stay". The Christian Science Monitor. Archived from the original on June 12, 2024.; Klein, Rick; Parks, Mary Alice (June 13, 2018). "The Note: Trumpism again dominates Republican Party". ABC News. Archived from the original on June 12, 2024.) Trump has been described as one of many nationalist leaders, including Vladimir Putin of Russia, Xi Jinping of China, Recep Tayyip Erdoğan of Turkey, Narendra Modi of India, Mohammed bin Salman of Saudi Arabia, Viktor Orbán of Hungary, and Benjamin Netanyahu of Israel. (Note: Multiple sources: Mazzetti, Mark; Kingsley, Patrick (March 21, 2025). "For Trump and Netanyahu, Similar Strategies With Similar Goals". The New York Times. "The American and Israeli leaders have been mirroring each other as they go to war with their own governments"; "With Trump's Victory, Europe's Populist Right Sees Return of a Fellow Believer". New York Times. November 8, 2024.; "Saudi Arabia Has Its Own 'Deal of the Century' for Trump". Newsweek. November 24, 2024. "The president-elect's "America First" platform resounds heavily with the transformative, increasingly nationalist path on which Riyadh's monarch-in-waiting has embarked.")

The Republican Party's right-wing populist movements emerged in concurrence with a global increase in populist movements in the 2010s and 2020s, coupled with entrenchment and increased partisanship within the party since 2010. This included the rise of the Tea Party movement, which has also been described as far-right.

Compared to other Republicans, the populist faction is more likely to oppose legal immigration, free trade, neoconservatism, and environmental protection laws. It has been described as featuring anti-intellectualism and overtly racial appeals.

In international relations, populists typically support American aid to Israel but not to Ukraine, though since 2025, a growing element is critical of aid to Israel as well. They are generally supportive of improving relations with Russia, (Note: Multiple sources: Lillis, Mike (February 28, 2024). "GOP strained by Trump-influenced shift from Reagan on Russia". The Hill. Archived from the original on February 28, 2024. "Experts say a variety of factors have led to the GOP's more lenient approach to Moscow, some of which preceded Trump's arrival on the political scene ... Trump's popularity has only encouraged other Republicans to adopt a soft-gloves approach to Russia."; Ball, Molly (February 23, 2024). "How Trump Turned Conservatives Against Helping Ukraine". The Wall Street Journal.; Chait, Jonathan (February 23, 2024). "Russian Dolls Trump has finally remade Republicans into Putin's playthings". Intelligencer. Archived from the original on February 29, 2024. "But during his time in office and after, Trump managed to create, from the grassroots up, a Republican constituency for Russia-friendly policy ... Conservatives vying to be the Trumpiest of them all have realized that supporting Russia translates in the Republican mind as a proxy for supporting Trump. Hence the politicians most willing to defend his offenses against democratic norms — Marjorie Taylor Greene, Jim Jordan, Tommy Tuberville, Mike Lee, J. D. Vance — hold the most anti-Ukraine or pro-Russia views. Conversely, the least-Trumpy Republicans, such as Mitch McConnell and Mitt Romney, have the most hawkish views on Russia. The rapid growth of Trump's once-unique pro-Russia stance is a gravitational function of his personality cult.") and favor an isolationist "America First" foreign policy agenda. This faction has been described as closer to that of Vladimir Putin's Russia and Recep Tayyip Erdoğan's Turkey than Western Europe and the Anglosphere in terms of positions on international cooperation, support for an autocratic leadership style, and trust in institutions. This faction takes nationalist and irredentist views towards other countries in North America, advocating for American territorial expansion to include Canada, Greenland and the Panama Canal, the renaming of the Gulf of Mexico, and potential military action on Mexican soil. (Note: Multiple sources: "Trump is teasing US expansion into Panama, Greenland and Canada". CNN. December 23, 2024. "His pitch to seize the Panama Canal – which he described as a "vital national asset" though it's been decades since America controlled it – reflected a similarly nationalist agenda that Trump often describes as "America First.""; "Lawmaker lauds Trump's expansion plan: Panama, Greenland, Canada 'should be honored'". The Hill. January 8, 2025.; "Trump refuses to rule out use of military force to take control of Greenland and the Panama Canal". AP. January 8, 2025.; "AS REPUBLICANS THIRST FOR WAR WITH MEXICO, DEMOCRATS PUSH TO MAKE THEM VOTE ON IT". The Intercept. August 31, 2023. "The response to the war powers resolution from the office of Rep. Matt Gaetz, R-Fla. — who has led recent efforts to reduce the U.S. military's foreign entanglements — highlights populist Republicans' growing pains in their emerging anti-war coalition with progressive Democrats.")

The party's far-right faction includes members of the Freedom Caucus. (Note: Multiple sources: Chatelain, Ryan (March 10, 2023). "Freedom Caucus issues demands for raising debt limit". Spectrum News NY1.; "Far-right Republicans drafted a short-term funding bill with GOP centrists. It's now at risk of collapse". NBC4 Washington. September 19, 2023.; Hulse, Carl (October 25, 2023). "In Mike Johnson, Far-Right Republicans Find a Speaker They Can Embrace". The New York Times.; Mascaro, Lisa; Freking, Kevin; Amiri, Farnoush (October 13, 2023). "Republicans pick Jim Jordan as nominee for House speaker, putting job within the Trump ally's reach". AP News.) They generally reject compromise within the party and with the Democrats, and are willing to oust fellow Republican office holders they deem to be too moderate. According to sociologist Joe Feagin, political polarization by racially extremist Republicans as well as their increased attention from conservative media has perpetuated the near extinction of moderate Republicans and created legislative paralysis at numerous government levels in the last few decades. The rise of the party's populists diminished the influence of its other factions.

==== Conservatives ====
Percent of self-identified conservatives by state as of 2018, according to a Gallup poll: 45% and above 40–44% 35–39% 30–34% 25–29% 24% and under

Ronald Reagan's presidential election in 1980 established Reagan-style American conservatism as the dominant ideological faction of the Republican Party until the election of Donald Trump in 2016. (Note: Attributed to multiple sources.) Traditional conservatives combine support for free-market economic policies with social conservatism and a hawkish approach to foreign policy. Other parts of the conservative movement are composed of fiscal conservatives and deficit hawks.

Conventional conservatism has been in decline across the Western world, not just the United States. In the European Union's multi-party system, right-wing populist parties and European conservative parties both received support from about a quarter of voters in the early 2020s, the highest share for right-wing populist parties since the end of World War II.

==== Christian right ====
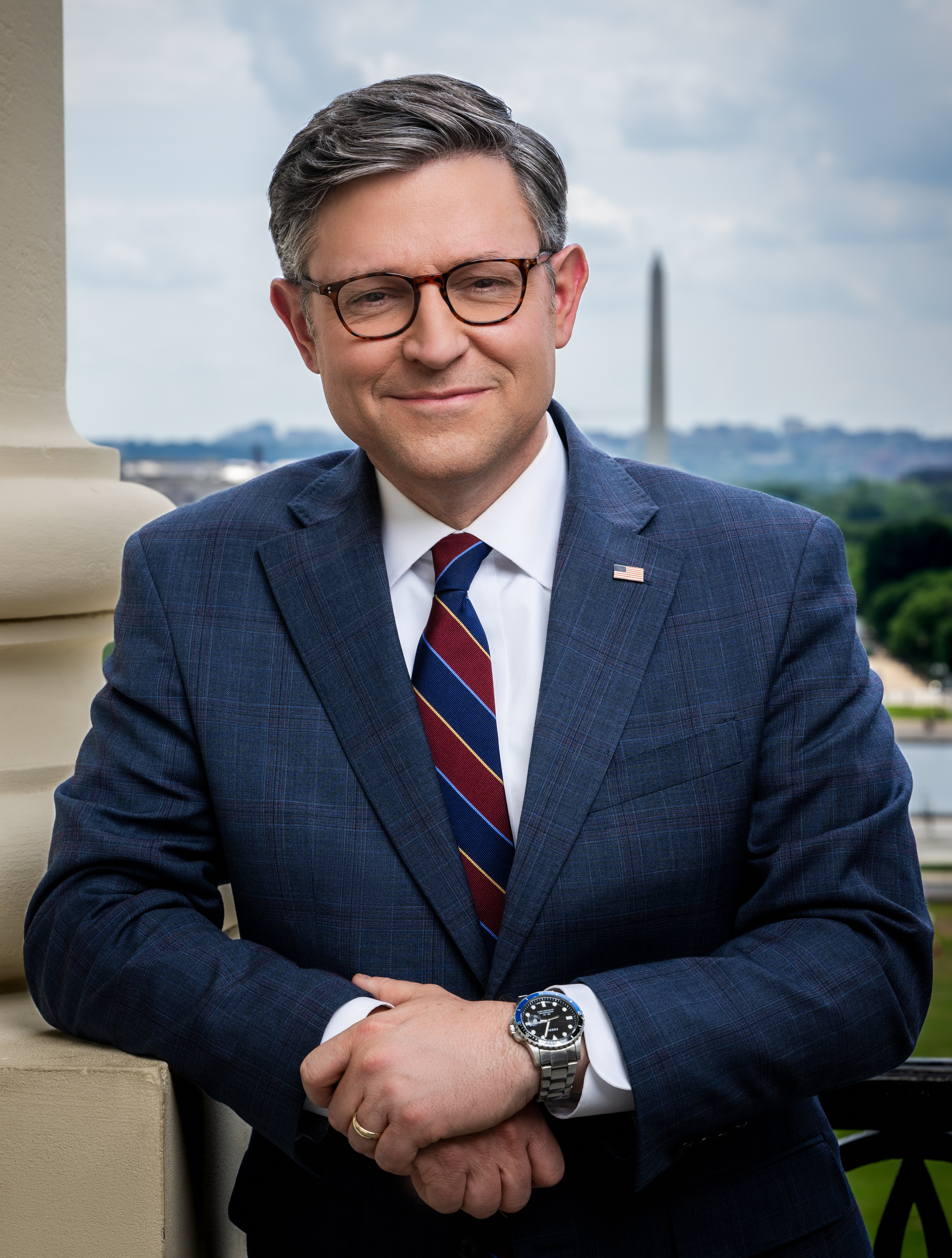
House Speaker Mike Johnson (2023–present)

Since the rise of the Christian right in the 1970s, the Republican Party has drawn significant support from evangelicals, Mormons, and traditionalist Catholics. The Christian right faction is characterized by strong support of socially conservative policies. (Note: Multiple sources: McDaniel, Eric L.; Nooruddin, Irfan; Shortle, Allyson F. (2022). "Preface". The Everyday Crusade. pp. xiii–xvi. doi:10.1017/9781009029445.001. ISBN 978-1-009-02944-5. p. xiii: "White Christian Nationalists are today the base of the Republican Party and those who attacked the U.S. Capitol are drawn from their ranks."; "First of Its Kind Survey Maps Support for Christian Nationalism Across All 50 States". Public Religion Research Institute. February 7, 2024. Archived from the original on June 16, 2024. "At the national level, Christian nationalism is strongly linked to Republican Party affiliation, white evangelical Protestant affiliation, and higher church attendance."; Whitehead, Andrew L.; Perry, Samuel L. (2020). Taking America Back for God. doi:10.1093/oso/9780190057886.001.0001. ISBN 978-0-19-005788-6.; "A Christian Nation? Understanding the Threat of Christian Nationalism to American Democracy and Culture". Public Religion Research Institute. February 8, 2023. Archived from the original on June 15, 2024. "Partisanship is closely linked to Christian nationalist views. Most Republicans qualify as either Christian nationalism sympathizers (33%) or adherents (21%), while at least three-quarters of both independents (46% skeptics and 29% rejecters) and Democrats (36% skeptics and 47% rejecters) lean toward rejecting Christian nationalism. Republicans (21%) are about four times as likely as Democrats (5%) or independents (6%) to be adherents of Christian nationalism."; Baker, Joseph O.; Perry, Samuel L.; Whitehead, Andrew L. (August 6, 2020). "Crusading for Moral Authority: Christian Nationalism and Opposition to Science". Sociological Forum. 35 (3): 587–607. doi:10.1111/socf.12619. hdl:1805/26816. "Christian nationalism has become a powerful predictor of supporting conservative policies and political candidates. This is in large part due to the Republican Party platform becoming synonymous with "restoring" the sacred values, moral superiority, unity, pride, and prosperity of America's mythic past."; Whitehead, Andrew L.; Perry, Samuel L.; Baker, Joseph O. (January 25, 2018). "Make America Christian Again: Christian Nationalism and Voting for Donald Trump in the 2016 Presidential Election". Sociology of Religion. 79 (2): 147–171. doi:10.1093/socrel/srx070. JSTOR 48556986. "The current study establishes that, independent of these influences, voting for Trump was, at least for many Americans, a symbolic defense of the United States' perceived Christian heritage. Data from a national probability sample of Americans surveyed soon after the 2016 election shows that greater adherence to Christian nationalist ideology was a robust predictor of voting for Trump..."; Lauter, David (February 17, 2024). "Will Republicans become a Christian nationalist party? Can they win if they do?". Los Angeles Times. Los Angeles, California. Archived from the original on April 5, 2024. "The strength of Christian nationalist sentiment can be clearly seen in a wide range of issues that Republican elected officials have stressed, including efforts to curtail the rights and visibility of transgender people, but also some less obvious topics, such as immigration."; Whitehead, Andrew L.; Perry, Samuel L. (February 17, 2024). "Is Christian nationalism growing or declining? Both". The Washington Post. ProQuest 2728318819. Archived from the original on June 16, 2024. "According to political scientists Stella Rouse and Shibley Telhami, most Republicans support declaring the United States a Christian nation. And Christian nationalists are running for office at all levels of government, from local school boards to presumptive presidential candidates. Though the numbers of those who claim Christian nationalist beliefs may decline, Christian nationalism's influence in public life only continues to grow."; Perry, Samuel (August 5, 2022). "After Trump, Christian nationalist ideas are going mainstream – despite a history of violence". The Conversation. Archived from the original on June 1, 2024. "The presence of Christian nationalist ideas in recent political campaigns is concerning, given its ties to violence and white supremacy. Trump and his advisers helped to mainstream such rhetoric with events like his photo op with a Bible in Lafayette Square in Washington following the violent dispersal of protesters, and making a show of pastors laying hands on him. But that legacy continues beyond his administration."; Cummings, Mike (March 15, 2022). "Yale sociologist Phil Gorski on the threat of white Christian nationalism". Yale News. Archived from the original on June 12, 2024. "White Christian nationalism is a dangerous threat because it's incredibly well-organized and powerful. There's absolutely nothing like it on the left."; Smith, Peter (February 17, 2024). "Many believe the founders wanted a Christian America. Some want the government to declare one now". The Associated Press. New York. Archived from the original on February 19, 2024.; Rouse, Stella; Telhami, Shibley (September 21, 2022). "Most Republicans Support Declaring the United States a Christian Nation". Politico. Archived from the original on September 27, 2022. "Christian nationalism, a belief that the United States was founded as a white, Christian nation and that there is no separation between church and state, is gaining steam on the right. Prominent Republican politicians have made the themes critical to their message to voters in the run up to the 2022 midterm elections."; Contreras, Russell (February 18, 2026). "Where Christian nationalism is most dominant in the U.S." Axios. "56% of all Republicans are Christian nationalism "adherents" or "sympathizers," the survey said. ... The report found that many of those who support Christian nationalism also support far-right conservative views around immigration, pluralism, and gender roles") Holding to right-wing interpretations of Christianity, they have varying beliefs on how it should influence law and public policy. Compared to other Republicans, the Christian right faction is more likely to oppose LGBT rights, marijuana legalization, and support significantly restricting the legality of abortion.

The Christian right is strongest in the Bible Belt, which covers most of the Southern United States. Mike Pence, Donald Trump's vice president from 2017 to 2021, was a member of the Christian right. In October 2023, a member of the faction, Louisiana representative Mike Johnson, was elected the 56th Speaker of the United States House of Representatives.

==== Libertarians ====
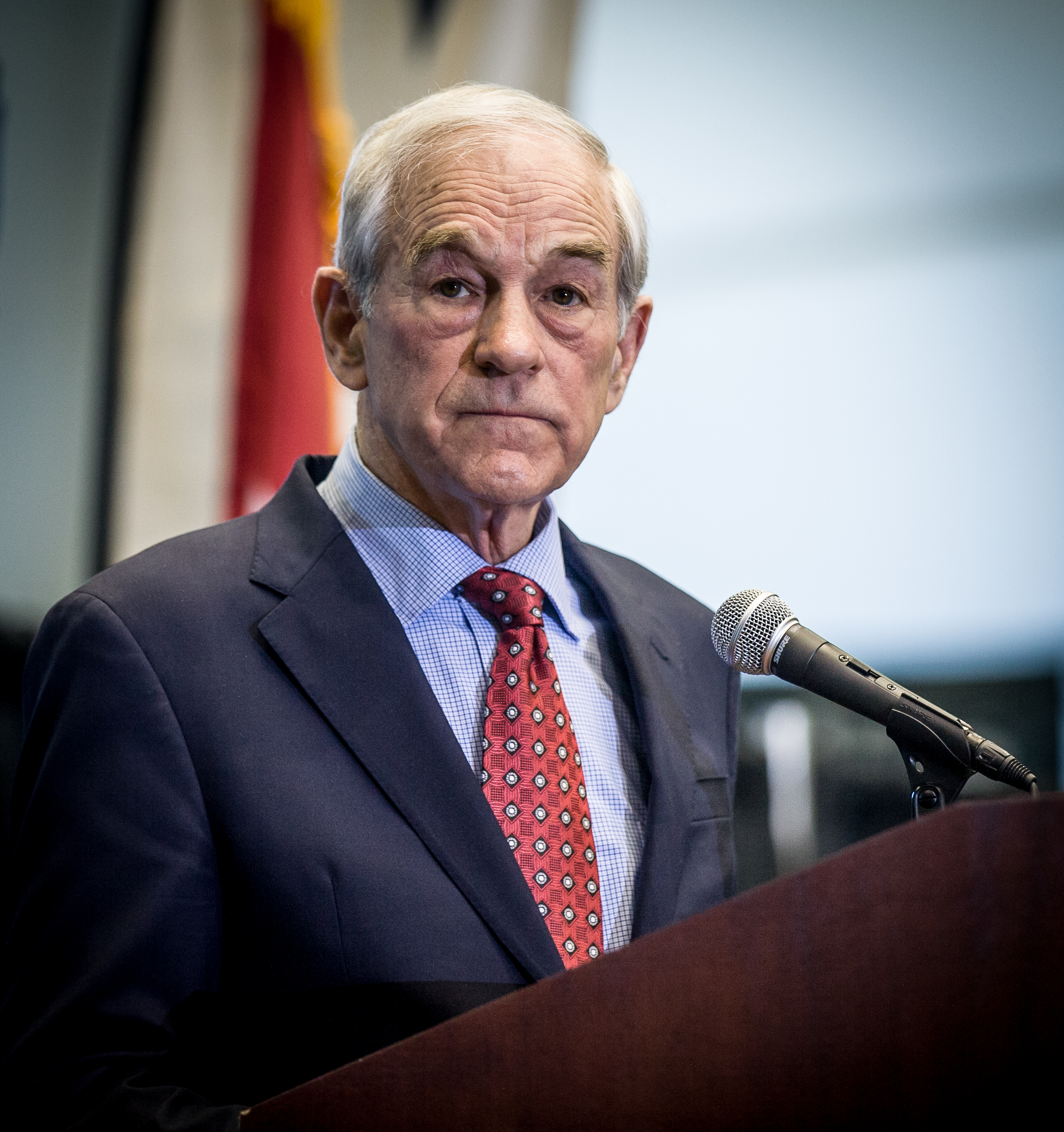
Former Rep. Ron Paul of Texas, who set off a libertarian revival while running for president in 2008 and 2012

The Republican Party has a libertarian faction. This faction of the party is most popular in the Midwestern and Western United States. Libertarianism emerged from fusionism in the 1950s and 60s. Barry Goldwater had a substantial impact on the conservative-libertarian movement of the 1960s. Libertarian Republicans support isolationism and a small government, and are the party faction with the lowest support for Trump as of 2023. Right-wing libertarians are strongly divided on the subject of abortion. Prominent libertarian conservatives within the Republican Party include Rand Paul, Thomas Massie, and Mike Lee.

==== Moderates ====
Moderates in the Republican Party are an ideologically centrist and center-right group that predominantly come from the Northeastern United States, and are typically located in swing states or blue states. Moderate Republicans are typically highly educated, affluent, fiscally conservative, socially moderate or liberal and often supported the "Never Trump" movement. Moderate Republicans differ in that some are for affirmative action, LGBT rights and same-sex marriage, legal access to abortion, gun control laws, environmental regulation and action on climate change, fewer restrictions on immigration and a path to citizenship for illegal immigrants. In the 21st century, a significant amount of former Republican moderates have switched to the Democratic Party, and the faction is in decline. (Note: Multiple sources: "The Decline of GOP Moderates". Washington Post. December 7, 2006.; "Decline of the GOP moderates". The Seattle Times. November 29, 2006.; Harris, Paul (October 25, 2008). "Republicans fear long exile in the wilderness". The Guardian.; Horowitz, Jason (January 18, 2012). "Mitt Romney and the fall of Republican moderates". Washington Post.; Drutman, Lee (August 24, 2020). "Why There Are So Few Moderate Republicans Left". FiveThirtyEight. Archived from the original on August 24, 2020.; Berman, Russell (January 27, 2023). "'We Used to Be Called Moderate. We Are Not Moderate.'". The Atlantic.; Skolnik, Jon (December 3, 2021). "Moderate Republicans are quitting as the GOP's big tent narrows". Salon. Archived from the original on December 3, 2021.)

Notable Republicans include Senators Lisa Murkowski of Alaska and Susan Collins of Maine, Vermont governor Phil Scott, and former Maryland governor Larry Hogan.

== Political positions ==
The Republican Party is a right-wing populist and neo-nationalist party. (Note: Scholars broadly agree that the modern GOP is a neo-nationalist party. There is an ongoing academic debate on type, and they have variously described the party as civic, cultural, or ethnic nationalist, (Note: One example is Steven Levitsky.) or taking aspects from them. (Note: Political scientist Cas Mudde discusses this debate in his 2019 book The Far-Right Today.) In 2026, the V-Dem Institute reported a consensus in political science that the party is "far-right" and its nationalism is "anti-pluralist".) Until 2017, it was generally described as upholding traditional American conservatism, with conservatives now only making up a minority of the party.

Comparative politics studies by the V-Dem Institute, Polity Data Series, Global Party Survey, Protect Democracy, The Washington Post, and the Manifesto Project Database classify the party as "far-right" in an international context, as well as a majority of political scientists. (Note: In 2026, the V-Dem Institute stated that there was a broad academic consensus that the GOP is located on the far-right of the international political spectrum. Political scientists and historians who hold to this stance, outside of comparative politics studies, include Cas Mudde, Pippa Norris, Lee Drutman, Steven Levitsky, Roger Griffin, Robert Paxton, Brian Klaas, Cristóbal Rovira Kaltwasser, Kenneth Roberts, Staffan I. Lindberg, and Jan-Werner Müller.) Freedom House described "the Republicans on the right and the Democrats on the left" in its 2026 report for the United States. The political theorist Jan-Werner Müller argued in 2026 that the Republican Party had "alarmingly radicalized" to a point of being further right than the far-right Alternative for Germany (AfD), but because of the U.S.' established two-party system, "still gives many people the impression of being "mainstream"."

By the early 2020s, the Republican Party distanced itself from its traditional international conservative allies and aligned itself with the global far-right, supporting right-wing populist parties such as the AfD in Germany, Fidesz in Hungary, the National Rally in France and Reform UK in the United Kingdom amongst others.

=== Embrace of Trumpism and far-right ideology ===
The election of Trump in 2016 saw the Republican Party shift to embrace and bring far-right, fringe, and extreme ideas and organizations into the mainstream. (Note: Multiple sources: Baker, Peter (December 1, 2022). "Trump Embraces Extremism as He Seeks to Reclaim Office". The New York Times. "Analysts and strategists see Mr. Trump's pivot toward the far right as a tactic to re-create political momentum [...] Mr. Trump has long flirted with the fringes of American society as no other modern president has, openly appealing to prejudice based on race, religion, national origin and sexual orientation, among others [...] Mr. Trump's expanding embrace of extremism has left Republicans once again struggling to figure out how to distance themselves from him."; Oreskes, Benjamin (May 23, 2024). "Trump and GOP repeatedly echo Nazi and far-right ideology as they aim to retake White House". Los Angeles Times.; Bierman, Noah (August 22, 2016). "Donald Trump helps bring far-right media's edgier elements into the mainstream". Los Angeles Times.; Swenson, Ali; Kunzelman, Michael (November 18, 2023). "Fears of political violence are growing as the 2024 campaign heats up and conspiracy theories evolve". AP News. "Trump has amplified social media accounts that promote QAnon, which grew from the far-right fringes of the internet to become a fixture of mainstream Republican politics [...] In his 2024 campaign, Trump has ramped up his combative rhetoric with talk of retribution against his enemies. He recently joked about the hammer attack on Paul Pelosi and suggested that retired Gen. Mark Milley, a former Joint Chiefs of Staff chairman, should be executed for treason."; Heer, Jeet (July 31, 2023). "The GOP's Nazi Problem Has Deep Roots". The Nation. ISSN 0027-8378. "His [Trump's] extensive record [...] includes his numerous sly uses of alt-right memes, his promotion of extremists like Steve Bannon and Sebastian Gorka, and his infamous "very fine people" response to the 2017 white nationalist rally in Charlottesville, Va."; Lowndes, Joseph (November 8, 2021). "Far-right extremism dominates the GOP. It didn't start — and won't end — with Trump". The Washington Post. ISSN 0190-8286. "But far-right extremism did not work its way to the heart of the Republican Party until the nomination and 2016 election of Trump. Neither single election cycles nor individual presidencies determine the trajectories of political parties. But through racial demonization, the treatment of political opponents as enemies and an embrace of executive authoritarianism, Trump achieved two critical things at once: He moved far-right radicals toward the Republican Party and the Republican voter base toward greater radicalization."; Brownstein, Ronald (February 14, 2021). "Analysis: Is the GOP's extremist wing now too big to fail?". CNN. "Robert P. Jones, founder and CEO of the Public Religion Research Institute, agrees. All these findings about Republican voters' tolerance for violence and conspiracy theories, he says, present "a chilling portrait of how far down the extremist tracks rank-and-file Republicans have gone with Trump."") His election shifted traditional Republican beliefs and ideology into a new leadership style and political agenda referred to as Trumpism. This realignment saw a reflexive opposition of liberal policies to "own the libs" become a core belief among its base.

Trump explicitly and routinely disparages racial, religious, and ethnic minorities, and scholars consistently find that racial animus regarding black people, immigrants, and Muslims are the best predictors of support for Trump. By 2025, congressional Republicans have increasingly used overtly bigoted language and offensive tropes against the racial and religious identity of their political opponents with little to no pushback from GOP leadership. In 2026, elected Republicans have increasingly used blatantly anti-Muslim rhetoric which was described by commentators as mirroring a prior increase in such rhetoric by the GOP following the 9/11 attacks in 2001.

The second presidency of Trump saw him nominate several White House officials, such as Paul Ingrassia and Kingsley Wilson, with ties to antisemitic extremists. His administration promoted social media content promoting remigration and containing antisemitic slurs, and was criticized as promoting Nazism and white nationalism, the latter of which has become influential within the party since the 2020s. Other social media posts from multiple government agencies have variously alluded to neo-Nazi and white supremacist literature and promoted ethnic cleansing and QAnon conspiracies. The Southern Poverty Law Center found that some "images and language appear to come directly from antisemitic and neo-Nazi publications and a white Christian nationalist website".

According to The New York Times, Republican youth groups have grown increasingly divided over the acceptance and prevalence of far-right speakers and ideology. In October 2025, Politico revealed leaked group chats among high-ranking leaders of the "Young Republicans" that included language praising Adolf Hitler and promoting Nazism, encouraging the rape and killing of political opponents, extensive use of antisemitic and racial slurs, and favorable opinions on slavery. The messages drew bipartisan condemnation, and another incident involving the display of an American flag with a swastika in Republican Congressman David Taylor's office a day later spurred significant political commentary about the future of the GOP and condemnation about the prominence of Nazi ideology within the party. (Note: Multiple sources: Kim, Catherine; McHugh, Calder (October 16, 2025). "The Young Republicans' Leaked Chat Is a Sign of Where We Could Be Headed". Politico.; Dunbar, Marina (October 15, 2025). "US Capitol police investigating flag with swastika in Republican representative's office – report". The Guardian. ISSN 0261-3077.; Stieb, Matt (October 15, 2025). "Republicans Have a Real Nazi Thing Going On". Intelligencer.; Heer, Jeet (October 17, 2025). "JD Vance Thinks That Tomorrow Belongs to Hitler-Loving Young Republicans". The Nation.; Chait, Jonathan (October 16, 2025). "Vance's Telling Defense of a Racist Group Chat". The Atlantic. Archived from the original on October 17, 2025.) The same month, Politico posted more leaked messages from Paul Ingrassia, then the Republican nominee for Office of Special Council, where he stated he had "a Nazi streak", that he wanted white men in positions of leadership, used ethnic slurs for Black people and Italians, and proposed making Kwanzaa and all celebrations of Black culture illegal. In March 2026, group chats among young Republicans created by the Miami-Dade Republican Party included slurs against Black and Jewish people, killing African-Americans, and Hitler's policies. Politico reported that several more scandals in 2026 involving Republican officials making controversial remarks led to concerns over the influence of "Groypers" and far-right ideology among young Republicans, with the conservative Manhattan Institute finding 31% of Republicans under the age of 50 self-identified as having "racist" views.

Starting in October 2025, Axios, Politico, The Economist, The Wall Street Journal, and The New York Times described the party as undergoing a "rift" among a growing cohort of anti-Jewish and antisemitic voices within the party and debate over how expansive the party's coalition should be. (Note: Multiple sources: Beeferman, Jason (December 3, 2025). "Young Republicans chapter plans to host far-right German leader after 'I love Hitler' chat". Politico. "The event is taking place amid a broader rift among Republicans over whether anti-Jewish voices have a place in their party and as an anti-Israel fervor among Democrats has sparked a wave of primary challenges in New York."; Benson, Samuel (November 2, 2025). "GOP leaders denounce antisemitism in their ranks but shift blame to Democrats". Politico. "Republican Jews acknowledged antisemitism is cropping up in their movement during a conference this weekend, but were quick to blame left-leaning Democrats for fanning the flames."; Zitner, Aaron; Collins, Eliza (December 22, 2025). "After Charlie Kirk's Death, MAGA Battles Over Free Speech". The Wall Street Journal. "Now, three months after Kirk was shot and killed at one of those events, his commitment to open debate is at the center of a bitter fight within the MAGA movement over the rise of antisemitic ideas and conspiracy theories."; Axelrod, Tal (November 2, 2025). "MAGA's war within: Right-wing purity tests". Axios. "President Trump's MAGA movement is increasingly at war with itself. The central issue: a purity test over MAGA inclusion. Why it matters: The MAGA fight, ignited by ideological differences over Israel, pulls on a lot of -isms — nativism, antisemitism, racism, sexism and Trumpism.") In January 2026, Trump publicly came out against those with antisemitic views in the party, which The New York Times and The Economist described as being contrasted with J.D. Vance's prior refusal to condemn the incidents and statement that the party did not need "purity tests".

Beginning in the early 2020s, several Republican politicians have been promoting the Great Replacement conspiracy theory. (Note: Multiple sources: Blake, Aaron (September 27, 2021). "How Republicans learned to stop worrying and embrace 'replacement theory' — by name". The Washington Post. ISSN 0190-8286.; Legum, Judd (May 17, 2022). "Republicans have invoked the 'great replacement' theory over and over". The Guardian. ISSN 0261-3077.; Joffe-Block, Jude (September 13, 2024). "How Trump is relying on a racist conspiracy theory to question election results". NPR. "He was also echoing the latest iteration of a once-fringe racist conspiracy theory that has now become mainstream in the Republican Party. The conspiracy — known as the "great replacement" — claims there is a plan to bring nonwhite immigrants into the United States and other Western countries to replace white voters to achieve a political agenda."; Beauchamp, Zack (December 2, 2025). "The dark reality behind Trump's new anti-immigrant policies". Vox. "And the concept of a "great replacement" of Americans by migrants, once the province of tiki-torch marchers at Charlottesville, is now widely proclaimed by the Republican Party's leading figures – from Trump on down."; Confessore, Nicholas; Yourish, Karen (May 16, 2022). "A Fringe Conspiracy Theory, Fostered Online, Is Refashioned by the G.O.P." The New York Times. ISSN 0362-4331.; Serwer, Adam (May 18, 2022). "Conservatives Are Defending a Sanitized Version of 'The Great Replacement'". The Atlantic. "Their reaction to the Buffalo shooting shows that the racist theory has now entered the Republican mainstream."; "Our View: 'Great replacement' lie runs deep in Republican politics". The Portland Press Herald. May 17, 2022. "Once again, the political agenda was "the great replacement" conspiracy theory, an idea born in the fringes of white supremacist movements that is becoming mainstream in Republican politics."; Goldmacher, Shane; Broadwater, Luke (May 17, 2022). "Republicans Play on Fears of 'Great Replacement' in Bid for Base Voters". The New York Times. ISSN 0362-4331.)

=== Economic policies ===
Enacting high tariffs on foreign imports is a core component of Donald Trump's fiscal agenda. Tariffs are taxes on foreign imports, mainly paid by domestic businesses, given that consumers generally do not import foreign goods directly. By raising tariffs to their highest levels since the Gilded Age, Trump enacted one of the largest tax increases by any Republican president. The Constitution's Import-Export Clause requires that only the federal government be allowed to collect tariff revenue from imports.

Historically, Republicans advocated for free markets and individual achievement as the primary factors behind economic prosperity. Reduction in income taxes for those with higher incomes is a core component of Republicans' fiscal agenda.

In February 2026, the New York Times contrasted Trump's economic policies with those of Mitt Romney, the previous Republican presidential nominee before Trump. It described Trump's economic ideology as similar to dirigisme, used in some countries such as France.

==== State capitalism ====
The relationship between income and voting broke down in the 2010s. Instead, age and education became the best predictors of voting behavior. Writing for Time magazine in 2024, Jeffrey Sonnenfeld described Trump's moves against capitalism as sharing "more in common with far-left progressive positions than with traditional GOP views, and are often far more progressive than the Biden Administration" and wrote that he expected such attacks to continue into his second term.

By 2025, Trump and the Republican Party largely abandoned traditional Republican orthodoxy about protecting and promoting the free market, (Note: Multiple sources: Aspan, Maria (August 14, 2025). "Trump is tightening the screws on corporate America — and CEOs are staying mum". NPR. "By demanding a cut of a private company's sales, in exchange for the right to do business, Trump is defying the traditionally Republican gospel of free-market capitalism."; Morrow, Allison; Mattingly, Phil (August 20, 2025). "Corporate America is silent as Trump abandons free-market principles". CNN.; Wile, Rob (August 22, 2025). "U.S. takes 10% stake in Intel as Trump flexes more power over big business". NBC News. "Trump continues to bulldoze through long-held norms regarding government and business, departing from the free-market ethos that has long prevailed in both major U.S. political parties."; Sutton, Sam; Guida, Victoria (August 22, 2025). "Trump is turning the government into an investment firm". Politico. "From tariff carveouts to pro bono legal work from white-shoe law firms, Trump is exerting power over U.S. businesses in ways that go beyond even Sen. Bernie Sanders's (I-Vt.) aspirations. His ability to inject his agenda into private enterprises and dealmaking has shaken the guardrails that protect businesses from sudden political shifts and defied the free-market orthodoxy that was a hallmark of Republican economic policymaking.") instead favoring state capitalism by taking direct government equity stakes in major US corporations, an approach that has been characterized by critics in favor of free market economics as socialist. (Note: Multiple sources: Graham, David A. (August 25, 2025). "Trump's Right-Wing Socialism". The Atlantic.; Bennett, John T. (September 5, 2025). "'This is socialism': Trump's private sector intervention causes heartburn on right". Roll Call.; Johnson, Keith; Lu, Chritina (July 16, 2025). "Trump Embraces State Capitalism". Foreign Policy.; "Trump wants to command bosses like Xi does. He is failing". The Economist. August 13, 2025. "Thankfully, Mr Trump only dabbles in state capitalism. Even so, his approach is damaging."; Morrow, Allison (August 13, 2025). "Trump is tightening his grip on the economy, taking a page from China". CNN. "Trump's realignment of American business also bears similarities to China's model of "state capitalism" — a mix between socialism and classic free-market capitalism in which the state is involved in, but doesn't directly own, private businesses."; Ip, Greg (August 11, 2025). "The U.S. Marches Toward State Capitalism With American Characteristics". The Wall Street Journal.) The Trump administration has also deviated from the GOP's conventional free market approach by ordering Nvidia and AMD to pay the federal government a portion of chip sales to China.

==== Taxes and trade ====
As of 2026, the Republican Party supports near-universal tariffs, but that has not always been the case. For example, during the last half of the 20th century, Republicans were strong proponents of free trade. However 68% of Republicans and Republican-leaning independents approve of the increasing tariffs while the Democrats overwhelmingly disapprove of it at 89%. The current Republican president, Donald Trump, has been a staunch proponent of enacting tariffs as a means of generating tax revenue and has been described as a mercantilist. In 2025, Trump raised American tariff rates to the highest in the world, at the highest level since the Smoot–Hawley Tariff Act of 1930. Donald Trump opposes globalization, and his economic policies have been described as attempting to unravel the multilateral global economic order, including the power of the World Trade Organization (WTO). Trump has expressed his admiration for Republican president William McKinley's tariff policies. McKinley was the author of the Tariff Act of 1890, and both Trump and McKinley nicknamed themselves as a "Tariff Man". According to an April 2025 Economist/YouGov poll, "Republican voters overwhelmingly support Trump's tariffs, while Democratic voters generally do not."

At its inception, the Republican Party supported protective tariffs. Abraham Lincoln enacted tariffs during the Civil War. The great battle over the high Payne–Aldrich Tariff Act in 1910 caused a split in the party. The Reciprocal Tariff Act of 1934 marked a sharp departure from the era of protectionism in the United States. American duties on foreign products declined from an average of 46% in 1934 to 12% by 1962, which included the presidency of Republican president Dwight D. Eisenhower. After World War II, the U.S. promoted the General Agreement on Tariffs and Trade (GATT) established in 1947, to minimize tariffs and other restrictions, and to liberalize trade among all capitalist countries. During the Reagan and George H. W. Bush administrations, Republicans abandoned protectionist policies and came out against quotas and in favor of the GATT and the World Trade Organization policy of minimal economic barriers to global trade. Free trade with Canada came about as a result of the Canada–United States Free Trade Agreement of 1987, which led in 1994 to the North American Free Trade Agreement (NAFTA) based on Reagan's plan to enlarge the scope of the market for American firms to include Canada and Mexico. President Bill Clinton, with strong Republican support in 1993, pushed NAFTA through Congress over the vehement objection of labor unions.

The 2016 presidential election marked a return to supporting protectionism, beginning with Donald Trump's first presidency. In 2017, only 36% of Republicans agreed that free trade agreements are good for the United States, compared to 67% of Democrats. When asked if free trade has helped respondents specifically, the approval numbers for Democrats drop to 54%, however approval ratings among Republicans remain relatively unchanged at 34%.

Income tax cuts have been at the core of Republican economic policy since 1980. At the national level and state level, Republicans tend to pursue policies of tax cuts and deregulation. Modern Republicans advocate the theory of supply-side economics, which holds that lower tax rates increase economic growth. Many Republicans oppose higher tax rates for higher earners, which they believe are unfairly targeted at those who create jobs and wealth. They believe private spending is more efficient than government spending. Republican lawmakers have also sought to limit funding for tax enforcement and tax collection.

The modern Republican Party's economic policy positions tend to align with business interests and the affluent.

Republicans have traditionally advocated in favor of fiscal conservatism. By the 2020s, Republicans have largely abandoned fiscal conservatism as an ideological cornerstone.

==== Labor unions and the minimum wage ====
The Republican Party is generally opposed to labor unions. Republicans believe corporations should be able to establish their own employment practices, including benefits and wages, with the free market deciding the price of work. Since the 1920s, Republicans have generally been opposed by labor union organizations and members. At the national level, Republicans supported the Taft–Hartley Act of 1947, which gives workers the right not to participate in unions. Modern Republicans at the state level generally support various right-to-work laws. (Note: Right-to-work laws ban union security agreements, which require all workers in a unionized workplace to pay dues or a fair-share fee regardless of whether they are members of the union or not.) Most Republicans also oppose increases in the minimum wage.

==== Environmental policies ====
Democrats and Republicans have diverged on the seriousness of the threat posed by climate change, with Republicans' assessment remaining essentially unchanged over the past decade.

Opinion about human causation of climate change increased substantially with education among Democrats, but not among Republicans. Conversely, opinions favoring becoming carbon neutral declined substantially with age among Republicans, but not among Democrats.

Historically, progressive leaders in the Republican Party supported environmental protection. Republican President Theodore Roosevelt was a prominent conservationist whose policies eventually led to the creation of the National Park Service. While Republican President Richard Nixon was not an environmentalist, he signed legislation to create the Environmental Protection Agency in 1970 and had a comprehensive environmental program. However, this position has changed since the 1980s and the administration of President Ronald Reagan, who labeled environmental regulations a burden on the economy. Since then, Republicans have increasingly taken positions against environmental regulation, with many Republicans rejecting the scientific consensus on climate change. Republican voters are divided over the human causes of climate change and global warming. Since 2008, many members of the Republican Party have been criticized for being anti-environmentalist and promoting climate change denial in opposition to the general scientific consensus, making them unique even among other worldwide conservative parties.

In 2006, then-California Governor Arnold Schwarzenegger broke from Republican orthodoxy to sign several bills imposing caps on carbon emissions in California. Then-President George W. Bush opposed mandatory caps at a national level. Bush's decision not to regulate carbon dioxide as a pollutant was challenged in the Supreme Court by 12 states, with the court ruling against the Bush administration in 2007. Bush also publicly opposed ratification of the Kyoto Protocols which sought to limit greenhouse gas emissions and thereby combat climate change; his position was heavily criticized by climate scientists.

The Republican Party rejects cap-and-trade policy to limit carbon emissions. In the 2000s, Senator John McCain proposed bills (such as the McCain-Lieberman Climate Stewardship Act) that would have regulated carbon emissions, but his position on climate change was unusual among high-ranking party members. Some Republican candidates have supported the development of alternative fuels to achieve energy independence for the United States. Some Republicans support increased oil drilling in protected areas such as the Arctic National Wildlife Refuge, a position that has drawn criticism from activists.

Many Republicans during the presidency of Barack Obama opposed his administration's new environmental regulations, such as those on carbon emissions from coal. In particular, many Republicans supported building the Keystone Pipeline; this position was supported by businesses, but opposed by indigenous peoples' groups and environmental activists.

According to the Center for American Progress, a non-profit liberal advocacy group, more than 55% of congressional Republicans were climate change deniers in 2014. PolitiFact in May 2014 found "relatively few Republican members of Congress ... accept the prevailing scientific conclusion that global warming is both real and man-made." The group found eight members who acknowledged it, although the group acknowledged there could be more and that not all members of Congress have taken a stance on the issue.

From 2008 to 2017, the Republican Party went from "debating how to combat human-caused climate change to arguing that it does not exist", according to The New York Times. In January 2015, the Republican-led U.S. Senate voted 98–1 to pass a resolution acknowledging that "climate change is real and is not a hoax"; however, an amendment stating that "human activity significantly contributes to climate change" was supported by only five Republican senators. By 2025, the GOP during the second Trump administration moved to abandon all efforts to regulate greenhouse gases by reversing the endangerment finding, and Trump criticized global warming as a "hoax" and a "con job". The Energy Department also released a report promoting climate change denial and refuting the scientific consensus on climate change after several climate skeptics were given government jobs.

==== Health care ====
The party opposes a single-payer health care system, describing it as socialized medicine. It also opposes the Affordable Care Act and expansions of Medicaid. Historically, there have been diverse and overlapping views within both the Republican Party and the Democratic Party on the role of government in health care, but the two parties became highly polarized on the topic during 2008–2009 and onwards.

Both Republicans and Democrats made various proposals to establish federally funded aged health insurance prior to the bipartisan effort to establish Medicare and Medicaid in 1965. No Republican member of Congress voted for the Affordable Care Act in 2009, and after it passed, the party made frequent attempts to repeal it. At the state level, the party has tended to adopt a position against Medicaid expansion.

Republicans typically believe individuals should take responsibility for their own circumstances and that the private sector is more effective in helping the poor through charity than the government is through welfare programs, and argue that social assistance programs cause government dependency. As of November 2022, all 11 states that had not expanded Medicaid had Republican-controlled state legislatures.

By the 2020s, Republican officials had increasingly adopted anti-vaccine activism and policy.

=== Foreign policy ===
The Republican Party has a persistent history of skepticism or opposition to multilateralism in American foreign policy. Its members have frequently advocated for restricting foreign aid to assert the interests of the United States. The modern GOP opposes liberal internationalism. Trump shifted the party towards an isolationist and nationalist agenda that is skeptical of international alliances and free trade.

==== Israel ====
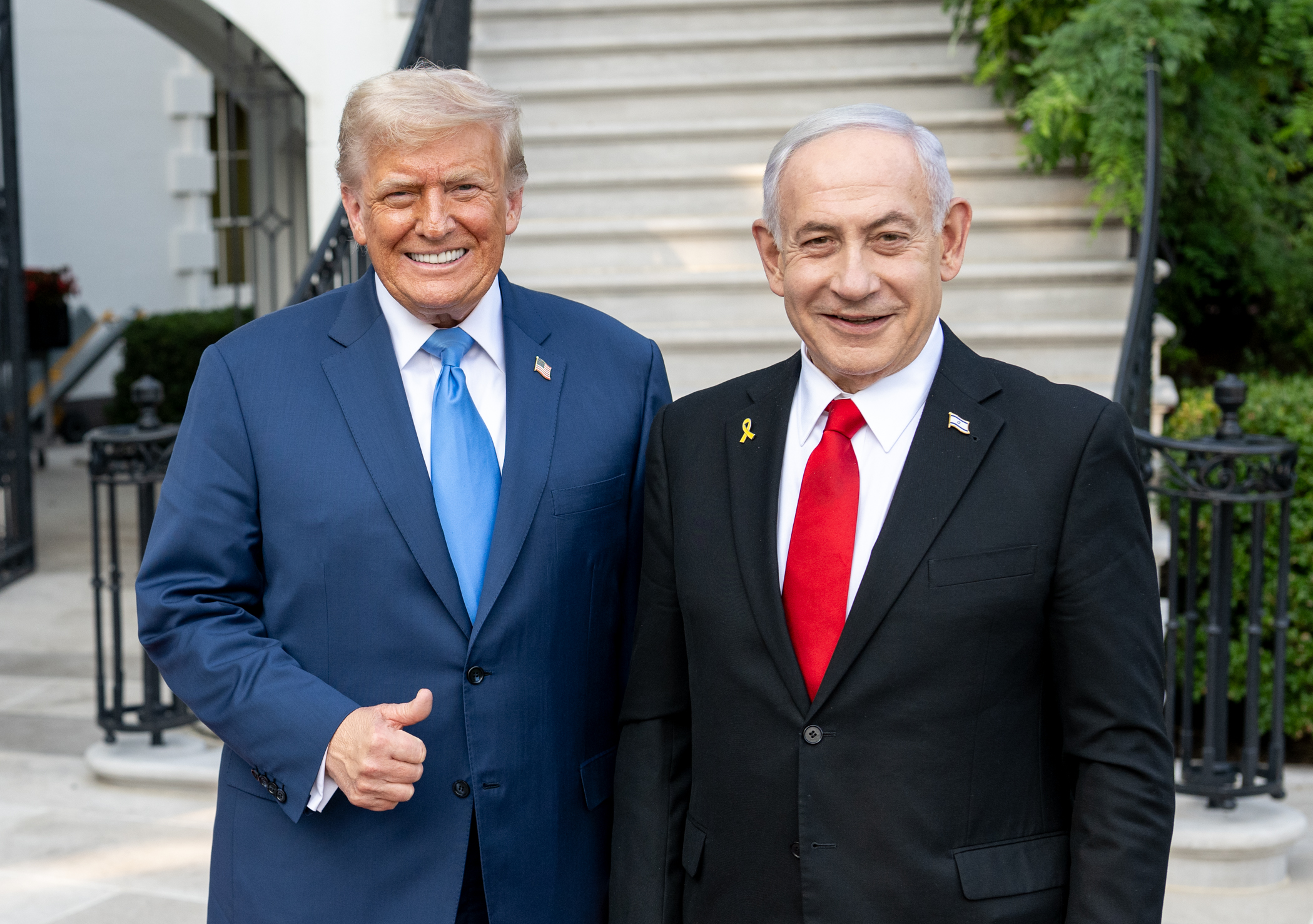
President Trump with the current Prime Minister of Israel, Benjamin Netanyahu (July 2025)

During the 1940s, many Republicans, particularly Senator Robert A. Taft, advocated for recognition of Israel, leading to support for Israel being integrated into the 1948 Republican Party platform. Nevertheless, some Republicans at the time opposed the cause of an independent Jewish state due to the influence of conservatives of the Old Right. The rise of neoconservatism saw the Republican Party become further pro-Israel by the 1990s and 2000s, although notable anti-Israel sentiment persisted through paleoconservative figures such as Pat Buchanan. As president, Donald Trump strongly supports Israel, but has at times been critical of Israeli Prime Minister Benjamin Netanyahu. According to i24NEWS, the 2020s have seen declining support for Israel among nationalist Republicans, led by individuals such as Tucker Carlson. Nevertheless, the 2024 Republican Party platform reaffirmed the party would "stand with Israel" and called for the deportation of "pro-Hamas radicals", while expressing a desire for peace in the Middle East. Although the Republican Party has often positioned itself as an opponent of antisemitism and denounced Democrats as insufficiently supportive of Israel, many members of the Christian right support Israel primarily due to theological beliefs about the centrality of Israel to the Second Coming of Jesus Christ and the conversion or damnation of Jews and other non-Christians.

==== Taiwan ====
In its 2016 platform, the Republican Party's stance on Taiwan was: "We oppose any unilateral steps by either side to alter the status quo in the Taiwan Straits on the principle that all issues regarding the island's future must be resolved peacefully, through dialogue, and be agreeable to the people of Taiwan." In addition, if "China were to violate those principles, the United States, in accord with the Taiwan Relations Act, will help Taiwan defend itself".

Mention of Taiwan was omitted from the party's 2024 platform.

==== War on terror ====
Since the terrorist attacks on September 11, 2001, neoconservatives in the party have supported the war on terror, including the War in Afghanistan and the Iraq War. The George W. Bush administration took the position that the Geneva Conventions do not apply to unlawful combatants, while other prominent Republicans, such as Ted Cruz, strongly oppose the use of enhanced interrogation techniques, which they view as torture. In the 2020s, Trumpist Republicans such as Matt Gaetz supported reducing American military presence abroad and ending intervention in countries such as Somalia.

==== Europe, Russia and Ukraine ====
The 2016 Republican platform eliminated references to giving weapons to Ukraine in its fight with Russia and rebel forces; the removal of this language reportedly resulted from intervention from staffers to presumptive Republican presidential nominee Donald Trump. However, the Trump administration approved a new sale of anti-tank weapons to Ukraine in 2017. Republicans generally question European NATO members' alleged insufficient investment in defense funding, and some are dissatisfied with American aid to Ukraine. Some Republican members of the U.S. Congress support foreign aid to Israel but not to Ukraine, and have been described by U.S. media as pro-Russian.

Amid the Russian invasion of Ukraine, several prominent Republicans criticized some colleagues and conservative media outlets for echoing Russian propaganda. Liz Cheney, formerly the third-ranking House Republican, said "a Putin wing of the Republican Party" had emerged. Former vice president Mike Pence said, "There is no room in the Republican Party for apologists for Putin." House Foreign Affairs Committee chairman Michael McCaul asserted that Russian propaganda had "infected a good chunk of my party's base". House Intelligence Committee chairman Mike Turner confirmed McCaul's assessment, asserting that some propaganda coming directly from Russia could be heard on the House floor. Republican senator Thom Tillis characterized the influential conservative commentator Tucker Carlson, who frequently expresses pro-Russia sentiments, as Russia's "useful idiot".

In April 2024, a majority of Republican members of the U.S. House of Representatives voted against a military aid package to Ukraine. Both Trump and Senator JD Vance, the 2024 Republican presidential nominee and vice presidential nominee respectively, have been vocal critics of military aid to Ukraine and advocates of a peace deal between Russia and Ukraine. The 2024 Republican Party platform did not mention Russia or Ukraine, but stated the party's objectives to "prevent World War III" and "restore peace to Europe".

In February 2025, during the Trump–Zelenskyy meeting, Trump and Vance hostilely berated Ukrainian president Volodymyr Zelenskyy.

=== Social issues ===
The Republican Party is generally associated with social conservative policies, although it does have dissenting centrist and libertarian factions. The social conservatives support laws that uphold their traditional values, such as opposition to same-sex marriage, abortion, and marijuana. The Republican Party's positions on social and cultural issues are in part a reflection of the influential role that the Christian right has had in the party since the 1970s. Most conservative Republicans also oppose gun control, affirmative action, and illegal immigration. By the 2020s, the GOP has shifted from traditional conservative support of limited government to instead support statism and increased government oversight when enforcing conservative cultural values.

==== Abortion and embryonic stem cell research ====
The Republican position on abortion has changed significantly over time. During the 1960s and early 1970s, opposition to abortion was concentrated among members of the political left and the Democratic Party; most liberal Catholics—which tended to vote for the Democratic Party—opposed expanding abortion access while most conservative evangelical Protestants supported it.

During this period, Republicans generally favored legalized abortion more than Democrats, although significant heterogeneity could be found within both parties. Leading Republican political figures, including Richard Nixon, Gerald Ford, Ronald Reagan, and George H. W. Bush, took pro-choice positions until the early 1980s. However, starting at this point, both George H.W. Bush and Ronald Reagan described themselves as pro-life during their presidencies.

In the 21st century, both George W. Bush and Donald Trump described themselves as "pro-life" during their terms. However, Trump stated that he supported the legality and ethics of abortion before his candidacy in 2015.

Summarizing the rapid shift in the Republican and Democratic positions on abortion, Sue Halpern writes:

...in the late 1960s and early 1970s, many Republicans were behind efforts to liberalize and even decriminalize abortion; theirs was the party of reproductive choice, while Democrats, with their large Catholic constituency, were the opposition. Republican governor Ronald Reagan signed the California Therapeutic Abortion Act, one of the most liberal abortion laws in the country, in 1967, legalizing abortion for women whose mental or physical health would be impaired by pregnancy, or whose pregnancies were the result of rape or incest. The same year, the Republican strongholds of North Carolina and Colorado made it easier for women to obtain abortions. New York, under Governor Nelson Rockefeller, a Republican, eliminated all restrictions on women seeking to terminate pregnancies up to twenty-four weeks gestation.... Richard Nixon, Barry Goldwater, Gerald Ford, and George H.W. Bush were all pro-choice, and they were not party outliers. In 1972, a Gallup poll found that 68 percent of Republicans believed abortion to be a private matter between a woman and her doctor. The government, they said, should not be involved...

Since the 1980s, opposition to abortion has become strongest in the party among traditionalist Catholics and conservative Protestant evangelicals. Initially, evangelicals were relatively indifferent to the cause of abortion and overwhelmingly viewed it as a concern that was sectarian and Catholic. Historian Randall Balmer notes that Billy Graham's Christianity Today published in 1968 a statement by theologian Bruce Waltke that: "God does not regard the fetus as a soul, no matter how far gestation has progressed." Typical of the time, Christianity Today "refused to characterize abortion as sinful" and cited "individual health, family welfare, and social responsibility" as "justifications for ending a pregnancy." Similar beliefs were held among conservative figures in the Southern Baptist Convention, including W. A. Criswell, who is partially credited with starting the "conservative resurgence" within the organization, who stated: "I have always felt that it was only after a child was born and had a life separate from its mother that it became an individual person and it has always, therefore, seemed to me that what is best for the mother and for the future should be allowed." Balmer argues that evangelical American Christianity being inherently tied to opposition to abortion is a relatively new occurrence. After the late 1970s, he writes, opinion against abortion among evangelicals rapidly shifted in favor of its prohibition.

Today, opinion polls show that Republican voters are heavily divided on the legality of abortion, although the vast majority of the party's national and state candidates are anti-abortion and oppose elective abortion on religious or moral grounds. While many advocate exceptions in the case of incest, rape, or the mother's life being at risk, in 2012 the party approved a platform advocating banning abortions without exception. There were not highly polarized differences between the Democratic Party and the Republican Party before the Roe v. Wade 1973 Supreme Court ruling (which made prohibitions on abortion rights unconstitutional), but after the Supreme Court ruling, opposition to abortion became an increasingly key national platform for the Republican Party. As a result, Evangelicals gravitated towards the Republican Party. Most Republicans oppose government funding for abortion providers, notably Planned Parenthood. This includes support for the Hyde Amendment.

Until its dissolution in 2018, Republican Majority for Choice, an abortion rights PAC, advocated for amending the GOP platform to include pro-abortion rights members.

The Republican Party has pursued policies at the national and state levels to restrict embryonic stem cell research beyond the original lines because it involves the destruction of human embryos.

After the overturning of Roe v. Wade in 2022, a majority of Republican-controlled states passed near-total bans on abortion, rendering it largely illegal throughout much of the United States.

==== Affirmative action ====
Republicans generally oppose affirmative action, often describing it as a "quota system" and believing that it is not meritocratic and is counter-productive socially, with critics arguing that it promotes reverse discrimination. According to a 2023 ABC poll, a majority of Americans (52%) and 75% of Republicans supported the Supreme Court's decision in Students for Fair Admissions v. Harvard prohibiting race as a factor in college admissions, compared to only 26% of Democrats.

The 2012 Republican national platform stated, "We support efforts to help low-income individuals get a fair chance based on their potential and individual merit; but we reject preferences, quotas, and set-asides, as the best or sole methods through which fairness can be achieved, whether in government, education, or corporate boardrooms...Merit, ability, aptitude, and results should be the factors that determine advancement in our society."

==== Gun policy ====
Both major parties in the United States support policies on gun ownership, in comparison to a large majority of the world, which give broad legality to the possession of private firearms. The modern Republican Party is now often seen as more favorable to laissez-faire gun laws. The National Rifle Association of America, a special interest group in support of gun ownership, has consistently aligned itself with the Republican Party. Following gun control measures under the Clinton administration, such as the Violent Crime Control and Law Enforcement Act of 1994, the Republicans allied with the NRA during the Republican Revolution in 1994. Since then, the NRA has consistently backed Republican candidates and contributed financial support.

Scholars note that Republicans and conservatives have historically supported forms of gun control when leftist groups, including Black Power and feminist movements, embrace "guns as tools for resistance and self‐defense against systemic oppression".

==== Criminal justice ====
The Republican Party has generally promoted strict anti-crime policies, such as mandatory minimum sentences and the death penalty. In the 2010s, however, prominent Republicans demonstrated some interest in criminal justice reform designed to combat mass incarceration, with President Trump signing the First Step Act, which expanded good behavior credits for perpetrators of most nonviolent crimes and required the U.S. Attorney General to develop a system to assess the recidivism risk of all federal prisoners. By 2024, however, the Republican Party and its leaders had largely left behind its prior support for reform of the justice system. Republican elected officials have historically supported the war on drugs. They generally oppose legalization or decriminalization of drugs such as marijuana.

Opposition to the legalization of marijuana has softened significantly over time among Republican voters and politicians. A 2021 Quinnipiac poll found that 62% of Republicans supported the legalization of recreational marijuana use and that net support for the position was +30 points. Some Republican-controlled states have legalized medical and recreational marijuana in recent years. In September 2024, then-candidate Donald Trump endorsed the legalization of recreational marijuana.

==== Immigration ====
Avatar of Homeland Security

Homeland Security
(@DHSgov)
tweeted:

The stakes have never been higher, and the goal has never been more clear:

Remigration now.

November 28, 2025

The Republican Party has taken widely varying views on immigration throughout its history, but has generally and traditionally taken an anti-immigration and nativist stance compared to the opposition. In the period between 1850 and 1870, the Republican Party was more opposed to immigration than the Democrats. The GOP's opposition was, in part, caused by its reliance on the support of anti-Catholic and anti-immigrant parties such as the Know-Nothings. In the decades following the Civil War, especially in the 1880s, the Republican Party lessened its stance on immigration, as it represented the manufacturers in the northeast (who wanted additional labor); although during this period, the Democratic Party still came to be seen as the party of both American and foreign labor, and many religious Republicans used anti-Irish and pro-Christian sentiments. Starting in the early 1930s, the parties focused on Mexican emigration, as the Democrats proposed a softer stance on Mexican immigration during the Great Depression and New Deal, rather than Republicans under Herbert Hoover.

The modern GOP opposes the large majority of immigration from non-Western countries, including the Middle East, Africa, Asia, and Latin America. In 2016, Donald Trump proposed to build a wall along the southern border of the United States. Trump immigration policies during his administration included a travel ban from multiple Muslim-majority countries, a Remain in Mexico policy for asylum-seekers, a controversial family separation policy, and attempting to end DACA. The party largely opposes immigration reform. The party's 2024 platform is opposed to immigration, and calls for the mass deportation of all illegal immigrants in the United States, which during Trump's second presidency was extended to immigrants without permanent legal status. The platform also calls for eliminating family-sponsored immigration, replacing the employment-based preference framework with a points system, and cutting federal funding for sanctuary cities.

Since the 2024 presidential election, the party's leading figures have shifted towards supporting remigration. In September, Donald Trump called for "remigration" of illegal immigrants to their home countries and suspending refugee resettlement, also pledging to "do large deportations in Springfield, Ohio", referring to the town's community of legal Haitian immigrants. The usage mainstreamed the term in the country. In May 2025 the Department of State released a "reorganisation chart" that included the creation of an "Office of Remigration". As President, Trump once again endorsed "remigration" in June 2025 as "reversing the invasion" of illegal immigrants into the United States. In July 2025 Trump claimed that the One Big Beautiful Bill Act would allow for remigration to be implemented. White House Deputy Chief of Staff Stephen Miller has been described as an advocate for remigration within the Trump administration. In October 2025, the U.S. Department of Homeland Security gained attention after tweeting "remigrate" from its official X account.

The Trump administration has brought Afrikaner South Africans to the United States and other European-ethnic refugees through its refugee program. In May 2025, Ramaphosa made a state visit to meet with President Donald Trump. During the press conference, Trump confronted him with claims of Afrikaner genocide in South Africa, which was denied by Ramaphosa.

==== LGBT issues ====
The Republican Party is broadly opposed to LGBT rights, including same-sex marriage, expression, and transgender rights. The large majority of its state and county/equivalent chapter platforms oppose same-sex marriage.

From the early 2000s to the mid-2010s, Republicans opposed same-sex marriage, while being divided on the issue of civil unions and domestic partnerships for same-sex couples. During the 2004 election, George W. Bush campaigned prominently on a constitutional amendment to prohibit same-sex marriage; many believe it helped Bush win re-election. In both 2004 and 2006, President Bush, Senate Majority Leader Bill Frist, and House Majority Leader John Boehner promoted the Federal Marriage Amendment, a proposed failed constitutional amendment which would legally restrict the definition of marriage to heterosexual couples.

As more states legalized same-sex marriage in the 2010s, Republicans increasingly supported allowing each state to decide its own marriage policy. As of 2014, most state GOP platforms expressed opposition to same-sex marriage. The 2016 GOP platform defined marriage as "natural marriage, the union of one man and one woman," and condemned the Supreme Court's ruling legalizing same-sex marriages. The 2020 platform, which reused the 2016 platform, retained the statements against same-sex marriage. Following his election as president in 2016, Donald Trump stated that he had no objection to same-sex marriage or to the Supreme Court decision in Obergefell v. Hodges, but had previously promised to consider appointing a Supreme Court justice to roll back the constitutional right. The Trump administration banned transgender individuals from service in the United States military and rolled back other protections for transgender people which had been enacted during the previous Democratic presidency.

The Republican Party platform previously opposed the inclusion of gay people in the military and opposed adding sexual orientation to the list of protected classes since 1992. The Republican Party opposed the inclusion of sexual preference in anti-discrimination statutes from 1992 to 2004. The 2008 and 2012 Republican Party platform supported anti-discrimination statutes based on sex, race, age, religion, creed, disability, or national origin, but both platforms were silent on sexual orientation and gender identity. The 2016 platform was opposed to sex discrimination statutes that included the phrase "sexual orientation". In the early 2020s, numerous Republican-led states proposed or passed laws that have been described as anti-trans by critics, (Note: Multiple sources: Gabriel, Trip (July 22, 2022). "After Roe, Republicans Sharpen Attacks on Gay and Transgender Rights". The New York Times.; Funakoshi, Minami (August 19, 2023). "The rise of anti-trans bills in the US". Reuters.; Clare Foran, Shawna Mizelle (April 20, 2023). "CNN". CNN.; "1A Remaking America: Why The GOP Has Rallied Behind Anti-Trans Legislation : 1A". NPR. June 2, 2022.; "From drag bans to sports restrictions, 75 anti-LGBTQ bills have become law in 2023". NBC News. December 17, 2023.; Schoenbaum, Hannah (January 7, 2023). "Republican states aim to restrict transgender health care in first bills of 2023". PBS News.) as well as laws limiting or banning public performances of drag shows, and teaching schoolchildren about LGBT topics. The 2024 party platform removes all mention of same-sex marriage saying instead "Republicans will promote a Culture that values the Sanctity of Marriage." However, the platform does explicitly declare opposition to topics relating to gender identity being taught in public schools, opposition to transgender women participating in women's sports, and opposition to federal funding for gender-affirming surgery.

==== Voting rights ====
Virtually all restrictions on voting have in recent years been implemented by Republicans. Republicans, mainly at the state level, argue that the restrictions (such as the purging of voter rolls, limiting voting locations, and limiting early and mail-in voting) are vital to prevent voter fraud, saying that voter fraud is an underestimated issue in elections. Polling has found majority support for early voting, automatic voter registration, and voter ID laws among the general population.

In defending their restrictions to voting rights, Republicans have made false and exaggerated claims about the extent of voter fraud in the United States; all existing research indicates that it is extremely rare, and civil and voting rights organizations often accuse Republicans of enacting restrictions to influence elections in the party's favor. Many laws or regulations restricting voting enacted by Republicans have been successfully challenged in court, with court rulings striking down such regulations and accusing Republicans of establishing them with a partisan purpose.

After the Supreme Court decision in Shelby County v. Holder rolled back aspects of the Voting Rights Act of 1965, Republicans introduced cuts to early voting, purges of voter rolls, and imposition of strict voter ID laws. The 2016 Republican platform advocated proof of citizenship as a prerequisite for registering to vote and photo ID as a prerequisite when voting.

After Donald Trump and his Republican allies made false claims of fraud during the 2020 presidential election, Republicans launched a nationwide effort to impose tighter election laws at the state level. Such bills are centered around limiting mail-in voting, strengthening voter ID laws, shortening early voting, eliminating automatic and same-day voter registration, curbing the use of ballot drop boxes, and allowing for increased purging of voter rolls. Republicans in at least eight states have also introduced bills that would give lawmakers greater power over election administration, after they were unsuccessful in their attempts to overturn election results in swing states won by Biden. (Note: Multiple sources: Corasaniti, Nick (March 24, 2021). "Republicans Aim to Seize More Power Over How Elections Are Run". The New York Times. Archived from the original on June 11, 2022.; Kalmbacher, Colin (May 26, 2021). "Arizona GOP Bill Would Allow GOP-Controlled State Legislature to Strip Key Election Powers from Democratic Secretary of State". Law & Crime. Archived from the original on May 31, 2021.; Gardner, Amy (May 29, 2021). "Texas Republicans finalize bill that would enact stiff new voting restrictions and make it easier to overturn election results". The Washington Post. Archived from the original on July 14, 2021.)

Supporters of the bills argue they would improve election security and reverse temporary changes enacted during the COVID-19 pandemic; they point to false claims of significant election fraud, as well as the substantial public distrust of the integrity of the 2020 election those claims have fostered, (Note: According to an NPR/PBS NewsHour/Marist poll, while more than 60% of Americans believe the 2020 election was secure, a large majority of Republican voters say they do not trust the results of the 2020 election. According to a poll by Quinnipiac, 77% of Republicans believe there was widespread voter fraud.) as justification. Political analysts say that the efforts amount to voter suppression, are intended to advantage Republicans by reducing the number of people who vote, and would disproportionately affect minority voters. (Note: Multiple sources: Glasberg, Davita; Armaline, William; Purkayastha, Bandana (January 1, 2022). "I Exist, Therefore I Should Vote: Political Human Rights, Voter Suppression and Undermining Democracy in the U.S." Societies Without Borders. 16 (1): 20–47. ISSN 1872-1915. Archived from the original on October 28, 2022.; Hardy, Lydia (May 1, 2020). "Voter Suppression Post-Shelby: Impacts and Issues of Voter Purge and Voter ID Laws". Mercer Law Review. 71 (3). ISSN 0025-987X. Archived from the original on October 28, 2022.; Brewster, Adam; Huey-Burns, Caitlin (February 25, 2021). "Proposals to restrict voting gain traction in Republican states". CBS News. Archived from the original on March 30, 2021.; Skelley, Geoffrey (May 17, 2021). "How The Republican Push To Restrict Voting Could Affect Our Elections". FiveThirtyEight. Archived from the original on October 21, 2023.)

== Republican presidents ==
As of 2025, there have been 19 Republican presidents and 20 Republican presidencies, which is 3 more than the Democratic Party.

Order of presidency	Name (lifespan)	Portrait	State	Presidency start date	Presidency end date	Time in office
16	Abraham Lincoln (1809–1865)		Illinois	March 4, 1861	April 15, 1865 (Note: Died in office)	4 years, 42 days
18	Ulysses S. Grant (1822–1885)		Illinois	March 4, 1869	March 4, 1877	8 years, 0 days
19	Rutherford B. Hayes (1822–1893)		Ohio	March 4, 1877	March 4, 1881	4 years, 0 days
20	James A. Garfield (1831–1881)		Ohio	March 4, 1881	September 19, 1881	199 days
21	Chester A. Arthur (1829–1886)		New York	September 19, 1881	March 4, 1885	3 years, 166 days
23	Benjamin Harrison (1833–1901)		Indiana	March 4, 1889	March 4, 1893	4 years, 0 days
25	William McKinley (1843–1901)		Ohio	March 4, 1897	September 14, 1901	4 years, 194 days
26	Theodore Roosevelt (1858–1919)		New York	September 14, 1901	March 4, 1909	7 years, 171 days
27	William Howard Taft (1857–1930)		Ohio	March 4, 1909	March 4, 1913	4 years, 0 days
29	Warren G. Harding (1865–1923)		Ohio	March 4, 1921	August 2, 1923	2 years, 151 days
30	Calvin Coolidge (1872–1933)		Massachusetts	August 2, 1923	March 4, 1929	5 years, 214 days
31	Herbert Hoover (1874–1964)		California	March 4, 1929	March 4, 1933	4 years, 0 days
34	Dwight D. Eisenhower (1890–1969)		Kansas	January 20, 1953	January 20, 1961	8 years, 0 days
37	Richard Nixon (1913–1994)		California	January 20, 1969	August 9, 1974 (Note: Resigned from office)	5 years, 201 days
38	Gerald Ford (1913–2006)		Michigan	August 9, 1974	January 20, 1977	2 years, 164 days
40	Ronald Reagan (1911–2004)		California	January 20, 1981	January 20, 1989	8 years, 0 days
41	George H. W. Bush (1924–2018)		Texas	January 20, 1989	January 20, 1993	4 years, 0 days
43	George W. Bush (born 1946)		Texas	January 20, 2001	January 20, 2009	8 years, 0 days
45	Donald Trump (born 1946)		New York/ Florida	January 20, 2017	January 20, 2021	5 years, 305 days
47	Donald Trump (born 1946)		Florida	January 20, 2025	Incumbent	5 years, 305 days

== Election results ==
=== In congressional elections: 1854–present ===
United States congressional elections
House election year	No. of overall House seats won	+/–	Presidency	No. of overall Senate seats won	+/– (Note: Comparing seats held immediately preceding and following the general election)	Senate election year
1854	13 / 234	▲13	Franklin Pierce	3 / 62	▲3	1854
1856	90 / 237	▲77	James Buchanan	18 / 62	▲15	1856
1858	113 / 238	▲23	James Buchanan	25 / 66	▲7	1858
1860	108 / 180	▼5	Abraham Lincoln	31 / 68	▲6	1860
1862	98 / 183	▼10	Abraham Lincoln	31 / 70	0	1862
1864	147 / 192	▲49	Abraham Lincoln	33 / 72	▲2	1864
1866	144 / 193	▼3	Andrew Johnson	39 / 72	▲6	1866
1868	171 / 243	▲27	Ulysses S. Grant	57 / 74	▲18	1868
1870	136 / 243	▼35	Ulysses S. Grant	58 / 74	▲1	1870
1872	199 / 292	▲63	Ulysses S. Grant	54 / 74	▼4	1872
1874	103 / 292	▼96	Ulysses S. Grant	42 / 74	▼12	1874
1876	136 / 293	▲33	Rutherford B. Hayes	39 / 76	▼3	1876
1878	132 / 293	▼4	Rutherford B. Hayes	31 / 76	▼8	1878
1880	151 / 293	▲19	James A. Garfield	37 / 76	▲6	1880
1882	117 / 325	▼34	Chester A. Arthur	37 / 76	0	1882
1884	141 / 325	▲24	Grover Cleveland	37 / 76	0	1884
1886	152 / 325	▲11	Grover Cleveland	38 / 76	▲1	1886
1888	179 / 332	▲27	Benjamin Harrison	38 / 76	0	1888
1890	86 / 332	▼93	Benjamin Harrison	47 / 88	▲9	1890
1892	124 / 356	▲38	Grover Cleveland	37 / 88	▼8	1892
1894	253 / 356	▲129	Grover Cleveland	39 / 88	▲2	1894
1896	206 / 357	▼47	William McKinley	46 / 90	▲7	1896
1898	187 / 357	▼19	William McKinley	51 / 90	▲5	1898
1900	200 / 357	▲13	William McKinley	55 / 90	▲4	1900
1902	206 / 386	▲6	Theodore Roosevelt	57 / 90	▲2	1902
1904	251 / 386	▲45	Theodore Roosevelt	57 / 90	0	1904
1906	223 / 391	▼28	Theodore Roosevelt	60 / 90	▲3	1906
1908	219 / 391	▼4	William Howard Taft	60 / 90	0	1908
1910	161 / 391	▼58	William Howard Taft	50 / 92	▼10	1910
1912	134 / 435	▼27	Woodrow Wilson	45 / 96	▼5	1912
1914	196 / 435	▲62	Woodrow Wilson	39 / 96	▼6	1914
1916	215 / 435	▲19	Woodrow Wilson	42 / 96	▲3	1916
1918	240 / 435	▲25	Woodrow Wilson	49 / 96	▲7	1918
1920	302 / 435	▲62	Warren G. Harding	59 / 96	▲10	1920
1922	225 / 435	▼77	Warren G. Harding	53 / 96	▼6	1922
1924	247 / 435	▲22	Calvin Coolidge	55 / 96	▲2	1924
1926	238 / 435	▼9	Calvin Coolidge	49 / 96	▼6	1926
1928	270 / 435	▲32	Herbert Hoover	56 / 96	▲7	1928
1930	218 / 435	▼52	Herbert Hoover	48 / 96	▼8	1930
1932	117 / 435	▼101	Franklin D. Roosevelt	36 / 96	▼12	1932
1934	103 / 435	▼14	Franklin D. Roosevelt	25 / 96	▼11	1934
1936	88 / 435	▼15	Franklin D. Roosevelt	17 / 96	▼8	1936
1938	169 / 435	▲81	Franklin D. Roosevelt	23 / 96	▲6	1938
1940	162 / 435	▼7	Franklin D. Roosevelt	28 / 96	▲5	1940
1942	209 / 435	▲47	Franklin D. Roosevelt	38 / 96	▲10	1942
1944	189 / 435	▼20	Franklin D. Roosevelt	38 / 96	0	1944
1946	246 / 435	▲57	Harry S. Truman	51 / 96	▲13	1946
1948	171 / 435	▼75	Harry S. Truman	42 / 96	▼9	1948
1950	199 / 435	▲28	Harry S. Truman	47 / 96	▲5	1950
1952	221 / 435	▲22	Dwight D. Eisenhower	49 / 96	▲2	1952
1954	203 / 435	▼18	Dwight D. Eisenhower	47 / 96	▼2	1954
1956	201 / 435	▼2	Dwight D. Eisenhower	47 / 96	0	1956
1958	153 / 435	▼48	Dwight D. Eisenhower	34 / 98	▼13	1958
1960	175 / 435	▲22	John F. Kennedy	36 / 100	▲2	1960
1962	176 / 435	▲1	John F. Kennedy	32 / 100	▼4	1962
1964	140 / 435	▼36	Lyndon B. Johnson	32 / 100	0	1964
1966	187 / 435	▲47	Lyndon B. Johnson	36 / 100	▲4	1966
1968	192 / 435	▲5	Richard Nixon	42 / 100	▲5	1968
1970	180 / 435	▼12	Richard Nixon	44 / 100	▲2	1970
1972	192 / 435	▲12	Richard Nixon	42 / 100	▼2	1972
1974	144 / 435	▼48	Gerald Ford	37 / 100	▼5	1974
1976	143 / 435	▼1	Jimmy Carter	38 / 100	▲1	1976
1978	158 / 435	▲15	Jimmy Carter	41 / 100	▲3	1978
1980	192 / 435	▲34	Ronald Reagan	53 / 100	▲12	1980
1982	166 / 435	▼26	Ronald Reagan	54 / 100	0	1982
1984	182 / 435	▲16	Ronald Reagan	53 / 100	▼2	1984
1986	177 / 435	▼5	Ronald Reagan	45 / 100	▼8	1986
1988	175 / 435	▼2	George H. W. Bush	45 / 100	0	1988
1990	167 / 435	▼8	George H. W. Bush	44 / 100	▼1	1990
1992	176 / 435	▲9	Bill Clinton	43 / 100	▼1	1992
1994	230 / 435	▲54	Bill Clinton	52 / 100	▲9	1994
1996	227 / 435	▼3	Bill Clinton	55 / 100	▲3	1996
1998	223 / 435	▼5	Bill Clinton	55 / 100	0	1998
2000	221 / 435	▼2	George W. Bush	50 / 100	▼5	2000 (Note: Republican Vice President Dick Cheney provided a tie-breaking vote, initially giving Republicans a majority from Inauguration Day until Jim Jeffords left the Republican Party to caucus with the Democrats on June 6, 2001.)
2002	229 / 435	▲8	George W. Bush	51 / 100	▲1	2002
2004	232 / 435	▲3	George W. Bush	55 / 100	▲4	2004
2006	202 / 435	▼30	George W. Bush	49 / 100	▼6	2006
2008	178 / 435	▼21	Barack Obama	41 / 100	▼8	2008
2010	242 / 435	▲63	Barack Obama	47 / 100	▲6	2010
2012	234 / 435	▼8	Barack Obama	45 / 100	▼2	2012
2014	247 / 435	▲13	Barack Obama	54 / 100	▲9	2014
2016	241 / 435	▼6	Donald Trump	52 / 100	▼2	2016
2018	200 / 435	▼41	Donald Trump	53 / 100	▲1	2018
2020	213 / 435	▲13	Joe Biden	50 / 100	▼3	2020 (Note: Democratic Vice President Kamala Harris provided a tie-breaking vote, giving Democrats a majority from Inauguration Day until the end of the 117th Congress.)
2022	222 / 435	▲9	Joe Biden	49 / 100	▼1	2022
2024	220 / 435	▼2	Donald Trump	53 / 100	▲4	2024

=== In presidential elections: 1856–present ===
Election	Presidential ticket		Votes	Vote %	Electoral votes	+/–	Result
Election	Presidential nominee	Running mate	Votes	Vote %	Electoral votes	+/–	Result
1856	John C. Frémont	William L. Dayton	1,342,345	33.1	114 / 296	New party (▲114)	Lost
1860	Abraham Lincoln	Hannibal Hamlin	1,865,908	39.8	180 / 303	▲66	Won
1864	Abraham Lincoln (Note: Lincoln and Johnson were nominated by the National Union Party, a wartime coalition of Republicans, War Democrats, and Unconditional Unionists.)	Andrew Johnson	2,218,388	55.0	212 / 233	▲32	Won
1868	Ulysses S. Grant	Schuyler Colfax	3,013,421	52.7	214 / 294	▲2	Won
1872	Ulysses S. Grant	Henry Wilson	3,598,235	55.6	286 / 352	▲72	Won
1876	Rutherford B. Hayes	William A. Wheeler	4,034,311	47.9	185 / 369	▼134	Won (Note: Although Hayes won a majority of votes in the Electoral College, Democrat Samuel J. Tilden won a majority of the popular vote.)
1880	James A. Garfield	Chester A. Arthur	4,446,158	48.3	214 / 369	▲29	Won
1884	James G. Blaine	John A. Logan	4,856,905	48.3	182 / 401	▼32	Lost
1888	Benjamin Harrison	Levi P. Morton	5,443,892	47.8	233 / 401	▲51	Won (Note: Although Harrison won a majority of votes in the Electoral College, Democrat Grover Cleveland won a plurality of the popular vote.)
1892	Benjamin Harrison	Whitelaw Reid	5,176,108	43.0	145 / 444	▼88	Lost
1896	William McKinley	Garret Hobart	7,111,607	51.0	271 / 447	▲126	Won
1900	William McKinley	Theodore Roosevelt	7,228,864	51.6	292 / 447	▲21	Won
1904	Theodore Roosevelt	Charles W. Fairbanks	7,630,457	56.4	336 / 476	▲44	Won
1908	William Howard Taft	James S. Sherman	7,678,395	51.6	321 / 483	▼15	Won
1912	William Howard Taft	Nicholas M. Butler (Note: Incumbent vice-president James S. Sherman was re-nominated as Taft's running-mate, but died six days before the election. Butler was chosen to receive the Republican vice-presidential votes after the election.)	3,486,242	23.2	8 / 531	▼313	Lost (Note: Taft finished in third place in both the electoral and popular vote, behind Progressive Theodore Roosevelt.)
1916	Charles E. Hughes	Charles W. Fairbanks	8,548,728	46.1	254 / 531	▲246	Lost
1920	Warren G. Harding	Calvin Coolidge	16,144,093	60.3	404 / 531	▲150	Won
1924	Calvin Coolidge	Charles G. Dawes	15,723,789	54.0	382 / 531	▼22	Won
1928	Herbert Hoover	Charles Curtis	21,427,123	58.2	444 / 531	▲62	Won
1932	Herbert Hoover	Charles Curtis	15,761,254	39.7	59 / 531	▼385	Lost
1936	Alf Landon	Frank Knox	16,679,543	36.5	8 / 531	▼51	Lost
1940	Wendell Willkie	Charles L. McNary	22,347,744	44.8	82 / 531	▲74	Lost
1944	Thomas E. Dewey	John W. Bricker	22,017,929	45.9	99 / 531	▲17	Lost
1948	Thomas E. Dewey	Earl Warren	21,991,292	45.1	189 / 531	▲90	Lost
1952	Dwight D. Eisenhower	Richard Nixon	34,075,529	55.2	442 / 531	▲253	Won
1956	Dwight D. Eisenhower	Richard Nixon	35,579,180	57.4	457 / 531	▲15	Won
1960	Richard Nixon	Henry Cabot Lodge Jr.	34,108,157	49.6	219 / 537	▼238	Lost
1964	Barry Goldwater	William E. Miller	27,175,754	38.5	52 / 538	▼167	Lost
1968	Richard Nixon	Spiro Agnew	31,783,783	43.4	301 / 538	▲249	Won
1972	Richard Nixon	Spiro Agnew	47,168,710	60.7	520 / 538	▲219	Won
1976	Gerald Ford	Bob Dole	38,148,634	48.0	240 / 538	▼280	Lost
1980	Ronald Reagan	George H. W. Bush	43,903,230	50.7	489 / 538	▲249	Won
1984	Ronald Reagan	George H. W. Bush	54,455,472	58.8	525 / 538	▲36	Won
1988	George H. W. Bush	Dan Quayle	48,886,097	53.4	426 / 538	▼99	Won
1992	George H. W. Bush	Dan Quayle	39,104,550	37.4	168 / 538	▼258	Lost
1996	Bob Dole	Jack Kemp	39,197,469	40.7	159 / 538	▼9	Lost
2000	George W. Bush	Dick Cheney	50,456,002	47.9	271 / 538	▲112	Won (Note: Although Bush won a majority of votes in the Electoral College, Democrat Al Gore won a plurality of the popular vote.)
2004	George W. Bush	Dick Cheney	62,040,610	50.7	286 / 538	▲15	Won
2008	John McCain	Sarah Palin	59,948,323	45.7	173 / 538	▼113	Lost
2012	Mitt Romney	Paul Ryan	60,933,504	47.2	206 / 538	▲33	Lost
2016	Donald Trump	Mike Pence	62,984,828	46.1	304 / 538	▲98	Won (Note: Although Trump won a majority of votes in the Electoral College, Democrat Hillary Clinton won a plurality of the popular vote.)
2020	Donald Trump	Mike Pence	74,223,975	46.8	232 / 538	▼72	Lost
2024	Donald Trump	JD Vance	77,302,580	49.8	312 / 538	▲80	Won

== See also ==
- List of African-American Republicans
- List of Hispanic and Latino Republicans
- List of Republican Party (United States) organizations
- List of state parties of the Republican Party (United States)
- Political parties in the United States
- Political party strength in U.S. states
