= Komp =

Komp or KOMP may refer to:

- Komp (Königswinter), division of Königswinter, Northrhine-Westfalia, Germany
- Komp (Denklingen) and Komp (Eckenhagen), divisions of Reichshof, Northrhine-Westfalia, Germany
- Betty Komp, American politician and member of the Oregon House of Representatives
- KOMP (FM), a radio station (92.3 FM) licensed to Las Vegas, Nevada, United States
- KOMP 104.9 Radio Compa, an album by Akwid
- Knockout Mouse Program (KOMP), part of the International Knockout Mouse Consortium

== See also ==
- Comp (disambiguation)
