= Lee Drutman =

American political scientist

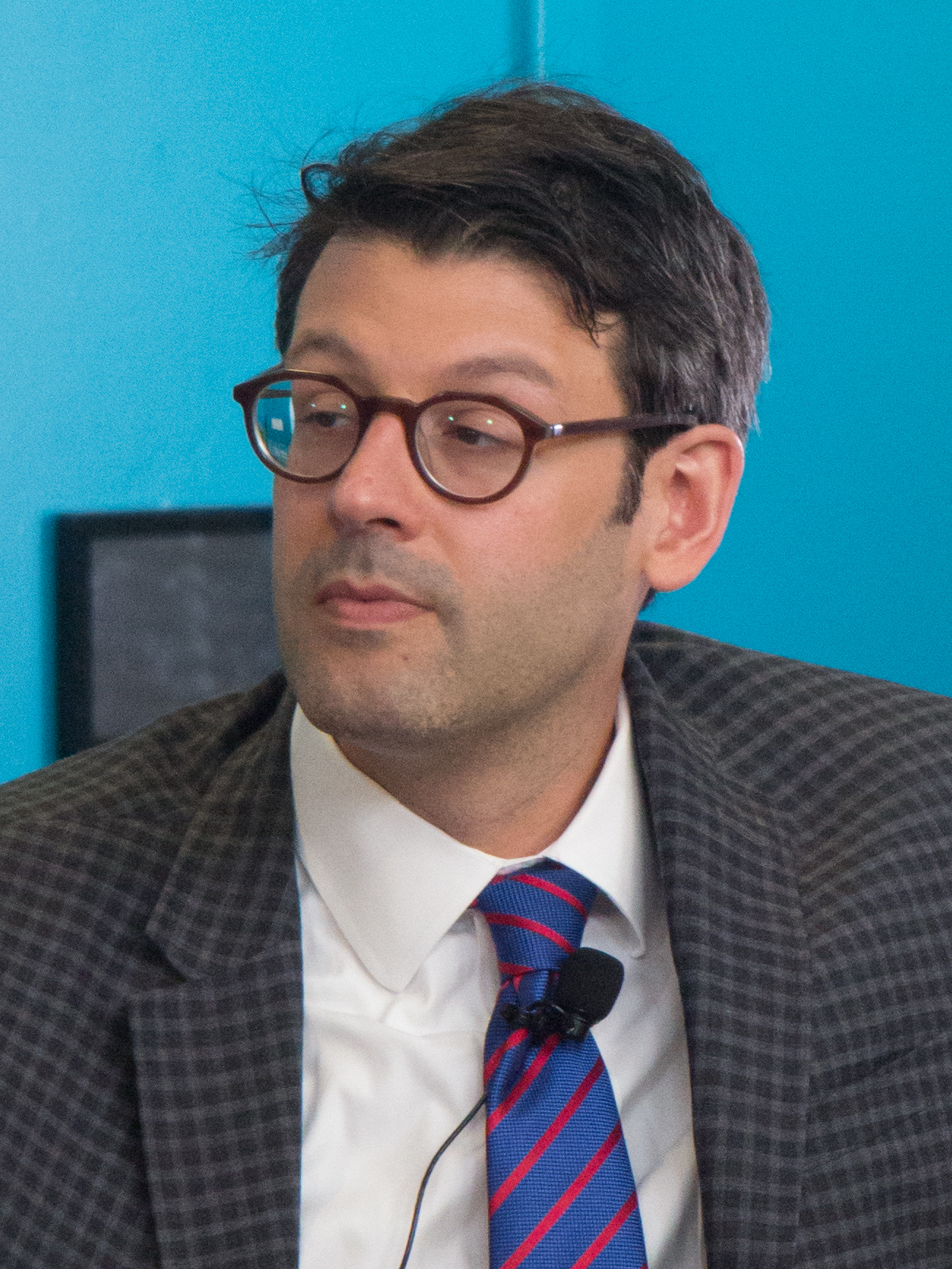
- Drutman in 2018
- Education: Brown University (BA); University of California, Berkeley (MA, PhD)

Lee Drutman is an American political scientist. He is a senior fellow at the New America Foundation. He is known as an advocate for proportional representation, particularly open-list, and fusion voting.

== Career ==
He has a PhD from the University of California, Berkeley, and a BA from Brown University. He received the 2016 American Political Science Association's Robert A. Dahl Award for "scholarship of the highest quality on the subject of democracy".

== Advocacy ==
He has advanced his arguments in favor of proportional voting in Breaking the Two-Party Doom Loop: The Case for Multiparty Democracy in America. In 2021, Washingtonian magazine listed him as one of the most influential people of Washington D.C., citing his advocacy for proportional voting. He was a regular contributor to FiveThirtyEight, where he wrote on current affairs. His work appeared in Noema, as well as Foreign Policy.

Initially, Drutman advocated for proportional representation (PR) with ranked-choice voting (single transferable vote) in the U.S. political system, arguing that it would reduce political polarization and minimize the risks of democratic backsliding. Since 2023, Drutman has argued the United States should use an open-list PR system for multi-seat races (Congress, legislatures, etc.) and fusion voting for inherently single-winner races (the presidency, governors, etc.) instead of ranked-choice voting. Despite opposing the primary system, Drutman says that ranked-choice-voting is useful in large candidate fields.

== Bibliography ==
- The Business of America Is Lobbying, Oxford University Press, 2015 ISBN 9780190677435.
- Two-Party Doom Loop: The Case for Multiparty Democracy in America, Oxford University Press, 2020. ISBN 9780190913854
