= Comp =

Comp, COMP or Comps may refer to:

== Places ==
In England:

- Comp, Kent

In France:

- Comps, Drôme
- Comps, Gard
- Comps, Gironde
- Comps-la-Grand-Ville
- Comps-sur-Artuby

== Music ==
- Accompaniment, especially in jazz
  - Comping (jazz)
- Compilation album
- Comping (post-production), an edited recording from the best parts of multiple takes
- Music composition

== Business and finance ==
- Comp (casino), complimentary item or service given by casinos to patrons to encourage gambling
- Comparable company analysis
- Comparables, in real estate, in determining a property's market value
- Complimentary, as in free of charge, such as a restaurant not charging for an unsatisfactory meal
- Comprehensive layout, in advertising and marketing, a proposed design presented to a client
- Same-store sales, in evaluating retail outlets' revenues
- Workers' compensation, compensation for work-related injuries and diseases

== Computing and technology ==
- Comp (command), a command in some computer operating systems which compares two or more files
- Comp.*, a class of Usenet groups devoted to computers and related technology
- Coordinated Multipoint (CoMP), a wireless communication technology

== Education ==
- College of Osteopathic Medicine of the Pacific, an osteopathic medical school in Pomona, California
- Composition studies, writing instruction emphasizing content and structure, as opposed to handwriting
- Comprehensive examination, in higher education
- Comprehensive school, a type of school in the United Kingdom

== Science ==
- Cartilage oligomeric matrix protein, or COMP
- Comparettia, an orchid genus

== Other uses ==
- Comp cards, used by modeling agencies in promoting models
- Competition Eliminator, a drag racing class commonly called Comp or Comp Eliminator
- Recoil compensator, a mechanism on a firearm
- Sweepstakes, called competitions or comps in Australia and the United Kingdom
