= Manifesto Project Database =

Database of political manifestos

The Manifesto Project Database (MPD) is the full database of political manifestos as well as election performance compiled by the Manifesto Research on Political Representation (MARPOR) project (MARPOR), formerly known as the Manifesto Research Group/Comparative Manifestos Project (MRG/CMP). It is maintained on the website of the Social Science Research Center Berlin in Germany. It describes itself as based on "quantitative content analyses of parties’ election programmes from more than 50 countries covering all free, democratic elections since 1945."

== History ==
The Manifesto Project Database grew out of the work of the Manifesto Research Group/Comparative Manifestos Project (MRG/CMP), started before 2003. In 2003, Hans-Dieter Klingemann of Social Science Research Center Berlin received the American Political Science Association's Lijphart/Przeworski/Verba Data Set Award for the project. Since October 2009, the Manifesto Project has been financed by a long-term funding grant from the Deutsche Forschungsgemeinschaft (DFG) to the Manifesto Research on Political Representation (MARPOR) project to update and make available manifesto texts and content-analytical data to the scientific community.

== Reception ==
=== Academic reception ===
The Manifesto Project can be considered one of the most widely used and influential comparative datasets in political science; its importance was recognized in 2003 by the Lijphart/Przeworski/Verba Data Set Award of the American Political Science Association for best data set in political science. There has been considerable academic research identifying potential problems with using the Manifesto Project Database (also referred to in the literature as the Comparative Manifestos Project) and ways to correct for it. Data from the Manifesto Project Database has been referenced in research on the policy preferences of voters.
