= List of Republican Party (United States) organizations =

This is an incomplete list of official and unofficial organizations associated with the United States Republican Party.

Some organizations are not formally affiliated with the national party due to campaign finance restrictions.

== Notable organizations ==
- Americans for a Republican Majority
- Capitol Hill Club
- Republican Majority for Choice
- Republicans for Choice
- College Republicans
- Republican Conference of the United States House of Representatives
- Republican Conference of the United States Senate
- National Republican Congressional Committee
- Congressional Hispanic Conference
- Congressional Institute
- ConservAmerica
- Delegates Unbound
- Freedom Caucus
- GOPAC
- Republican Governors Association
- Hollywood Congress of Republicans
- Hoover League
- Huck PAC
- Idaho Federation of Reagan Republicans
- International Republican Institute
- Republican Jewish Coalition
- Kansas Traditional Republican Majority
- Republican Leadership Council
- Liberty Caucus
- Republican National Coalition for Life
- Lincoln–Roosevelt League
- Log Cabin Republicans
- Republican Main Street Partnership
- Mainstream Republicans of Washington
- National Black Republican Association
- Republican National Committee
- National Council for a New America
- National Federation of Republican Assemblies
- National Federation of Republican Women
- Physicians' Council for Responsible Reform
- Republican Liberty Caucus
- Republican National Hispanic Assembly
- Republican State Leadership Committee
- Republicans Abroad
- Republicans for Immigration Reform
- Republicans Overseas
- RightChange.com
- RightNOW Women
- Ripon Society
- SarahPAC
- National Republican Senatorial Committee
- Republican Study Committee
- Tea Party Caucus
- Teen Age Republicans
- Texans for a Republican Majority
- The Tuesday Group
- Republican Unity Coalition
- The Wish List
- Young Republicans

== See also ==
- List of state parties of the Republican Party (United States)
