= List of state parties of the Republican Party (United States) =

The Republican Party is one of the two major contemporary political parties in the United States, the other being the Democratic Party. Founded by Slave activists in 1854, it dominated politics nationally for most of the period from 1860 to 1932. There have been 19 Republican presidents, the first being Abraham Lincoln, serving from 1861 to 1865, and the most recent being Donald Trump. See: List of presidents of the United States.

This is a list of the official state and territorial party organizations of the Republican Party.

== State and territorial organizations ==
Republican majority

State and territorial organizations. Party breakdown by upper and lower house. And executive offices.
State/Territorial Party	Chair	Start	Elected Executive Offices	Upper House Seats	Lower House Seats	Website
Republican National Committee	Joe Gruters	August 22, 2025	2 / 2	53 / 100	Voting members: 220 / 435; Non-voting members: 3 / 6	
Alabama Republican Party	Scott Stadthagen	March 7, 2026	10 / 10	27 / 35	76 / 105	
Alaska Republican Party	Carmela Warfield	April 20, 2024	2 / 2	13 / 20 (+1 Democrat in caucus)	21 / 40 (-2 caucusing with the Democratic coalition) (-1 without a caucus)	
Arizona Republican Party	Sergio Arellano	January 25, 2026	8 / 11	16 / 30	31 / 60	
Republican Party of Arkansas	Joseph K. Wood	August 19, 2023	7 / 7	29 / 35	82 / 100	
California Republican Party	Corrin Rankin	March 16, 2025	0 / 8	8 / 40	18 / 80	
Colorado Republican Party	Craig Steiner	May 30, 2026	0 / 5	12 / 35	19 / 65	
Connecticut Republican Party	Ben Proto	June 22, 2021	0 / 6	12 / 36	53 / 151	
Republican State Committee of Delaware	Gene Truono	August 11, 2025	0 / 6	6 / 21	15 / 41	
Republican Party of Florida	Evan Power	December 17, 2023; Acting: December 17, 2023 – January 8, 2024	5 / 5	28 / 40	87 / 120	
Georgia Republican Party	Josh McKoon	July 10, 2023	11 / 13	33 / 56	102 / 180	
Hawaii Republican Party	Shirlene Ostrov	November 3, 2025; Acting: November 3, 2025 – December 2025	0 / 2	2 / 25	6 / 51	
Idaho Republican Party	Dorothy Moon	July 16, 2022	7 / 7	28 / 35	59 / 70	
Illinois Republican Party	Bob Grogan	May 18, 2026	0 / 6	19 / 59	40 / 118	
Indiana Republican Party	Lana Keesling	February 13, 2025	7 / 7	39 / 50	70 / 100	
Republican Party of Iowa	Jeff Kaufmann	June 28, 2014	6 / 7	34 / 50	64 / 100	
Kansas Republican Party	Danedri Herbert	March 1, 2025	4 / 6	28 / 40	85 / 125	
Republican Party of Kentucky	Robert Benvenuti	December 11, 2023	5 / 7	31 / 38	80 / 100	
Republican Party of Louisiana	Derek Babcock	April 6, 2024	7 / 7	28 / 39	73 / 105	
Maine Republican Party	Jim Deyermond	January 11, 2025	0 / 1	13 / 35	68 / 151	
Maryland Republican Party	Nicole Beus Harris	December 10, 2022	0 / 4	13 / 47	39 / 141	
Massachusetts Republican Party	Amy Carnevale	January 31, 2023	0 / 6	5 / 40	25 / 160	
Michigan Republican Party	Jim Runestad	February 22, 2025	0 / 4	18 / 38	58 / 110	
Republican Party of Minnesota	Alex Plechash	December 14, 2024	0 / 5	33 / 67	67 / 134; 1 vacant	
Mississippi Republican Party	Mike Hurst	May 13, 2024	8 / 8	36 / 52	76 / 122	
Missouri Republican Party	Peter Kinder	February 1, 2025	6 / 6	24 / 34	111 / 163	
Montana Republican Party	Art Wittich	June 28, 2025	6 / 6	34 / 50	68 / 100	
Nebraska Republican Party	Mary Jane Truemper	March 22, 2025	6 / 6	Nebraska Legislature; 32 / 49 (Officially nonpartisan)		
Nevada Republican Party	Mike McDonald	April 22, 2012	3 / 6	8 / 21	14 / 42	
New Hampshire Republican State Committee	Scott Maltzie	January 23, 2026	1 / 1	14 / 24	199 / 400	
New Jersey Republican State Committee	Christine Hanlon	January 9, 2026	0 / 2	15 / 40	34 / 80	
Republican Party of New Mexico	Mike Nelson; Acting	May 27, 2026	0 / 7	15 / 42	25 / 70	
New York Republican State Committee	Ed Cox	March 13, 2023	0 / 4	21 / 63	48 / 150	
North Carolina Republican Party	Jason Simmons	March 26, 2024	5 / 10	30 / 50	72 / 120	
North Dakota Republican Party	Matthew Simon	June 16, 2025	13 / 13	43 / 47	82 / 94	
Ohio Republican Party	Alex Triantafilou	January 6, 2023	6 / 6	24 / 33	65 / 99	
Oklahoma Republican Party	Charity Linch	May 3, 2025	11 / 11	40 / 48	81 / 101	
Oregon Republican Party	Connie Whelchel	April 9, 2025	0 / 5	11 / 30	25 / 60	
Pennsylvania Republican Party	Greg Rothman	February 8, 2025	3 / 5	28 / 50	101 / 203	
Rhode Island Republican Party	Allyn Meyers	January 30, 2026	0 / 5	5 / 38	10 / 75	
South Carolina Republican Party	Drew McKissick	May 13, 2017	7 / 8	34 / 46	88 / 124	
South Dakota Republican Party	Jim Eschenbaum	February 22, 2025	13 / 13	31 / 35	63 / 70	
Tennessee Republican Party	Scott Golden	December 3, 2016	1 / 1	27 / 33	75 / 99	
Republican Party of Texas	D'rinda Randall	June 12, 2026	9 / 9	19 / 31	86 / 150	
Utah Republican Party	Rob Axson	April 22, 2023	5 / 5	23 / 29	61 / 75	
Vermont Republican Party	Paul Dame	November 6, 2021	2 / 6	7 / 30	37 / 150	
Republican Party of Virginia	Jeff Ryer	February 7, 2026	0 / 3	19 / 40	36 / 100	
Washington State Republican Party	Jim Walsh	August 12, 2023	0 / 9	20 / 49 (+1 Democrat caucusing)	41 / 95	
West Virginia Republican Party	Josh Holstein	July 26, 2025	6 / 6	32 / 34	91 / 100	
Republican Party of Wisconsin	Brian Schimming	December 10, 2022	1 / 5	18 / 33	54 / 99	
Wyoming Republican Party	Bryan Miller	May 3, 2025	5 / 5	28 / 30	56 / 60	
Republican Party of American Samoa	Will Sword	October 27, 2018	2 / 2	0 / 18 (Officially nonpartisan)	0 / 21 (Officially nonpartisan)	
District of Columbia Republican Party	Patrick Mara	January 14, 2021	0 / 2	D.C. Council; 0 / 13		
Republican Party of Guam	Shawn Gumataotao	March 16, 2024	1 / 4	Guam Legislature; 6 / 15		
Northern Mariana Islands Republican Party	James Ada	August 1, 2026	1 / 3	4 / 9	3 / 20 (+1 independent in caucus)	
Republican Party of Puerto Rico	Ángel Cintrón	May 7, 2021	1 / 1	0 / 30	0 / 51	
Republican Party of the Virgin Islands	John Yob	May 4, 2024	0 / 2	Legislature of the Virgin Islands; 0 / 15		
Republicans Overseas	Bruce Ash	September 14, 2013	N/A	N/A	N/A	

== See also ==
- List of United States state legislatures
- Republican Party (United States) organizations
- List of state parties of the Democratic Party (United States)
- List of state parties of the Libertarian Party (United States)
