= Senator Nunn (disambiguation) =

Sam Nunn (born 1938) was a U.S. Senator from Georgia from 1972 to 1997. Senator Nunn may also refer to:

- Matt Nunn (politician) (born 1978), Kentucky State Senate
- Zach Nunn (born 1979), Iowa State Senate
