= Ed Ford =

Ed Ford may refer to:

- Ed Ford (baseball)
- Ed Ford (politician)
