= Rick Fox (disambiguation) =

Rick Fox (born 1969) is a Bahamaian-Canadian former basketball player and politician.

Rick Fox may also refer to:

- Rick Fox (American football), American football coach
- Rick Fox (politician) (born 1952), American politician

== See also ==
- Rik Fox (born 1955), American bassist
