= Republican Majority for Choice =

Defunct pro-choice Republican PAC

The Republican Majority for Choice (RMC) was a Republican organization in the United States dedicated to preserving legal access to abortion. The group also supported federal funding for all kinds of stem cell research, including embryonic stem cell research.

RMC had a political action committee and supported Republicans across the country who favored abortion rights. The group closed operations in 2018.

== History ==
The Republican Majority for Choice began its life as the Republican Coalition for Choice, founded in 1989 by Mary Dent Crisp, former Co-Chair of the Republican National Committee and former National Committeewoman from Arizona. It was renamed from the Republican Pro-Choice Coalition in 2004.

The Republican Majority for Choice was allied with other Moderate to Liberal Republican Groups such as The Republican Main Street Partnership, Christine Todd Whitman's It's My Party Too, Ann Stone's Republicans for Choice, the Log Cabin Republicans, The Wish List, Republicans for Environmental Protection, and the Kansas Traditional Republican Majority. In 2018, the RMC announced that it was closing operations and its leadership announced they were leaving the GOP citing the party's anti-abortion platform.

== Supported candidates ==
The following candidates were supported by the Republican Majority for Choice in one or more of their elections.

=== U.S. Senate ===
- Susan Collins, Maine
- Shelley Moore Capito, West Virginia
- Lisa Murkowski, Alaska
- Scott Brown, Massachusetts (retired)
- Lincoln Chaffee, Rhode Island (retired, switched to Democratic Party, then Libertarian Party)
- Olympia Snowe, Maine (retired)
- Arlen Specter, Pennsylvania (retired, switched to Democratic Party)

=== U.S. House of Representatives ===
- Lynn Jenkins, Kansas (KS-2) (retired)
- Rodney Frelinghuysen New Jersey (NJ-11) (retired)
- Charlie Dent, Pennsylvania (PA-15) (retired)

== See also ==
- Republicans for Choice
- Democrats for Life of America
