= Daniel Mongiardo =

American physician and politician

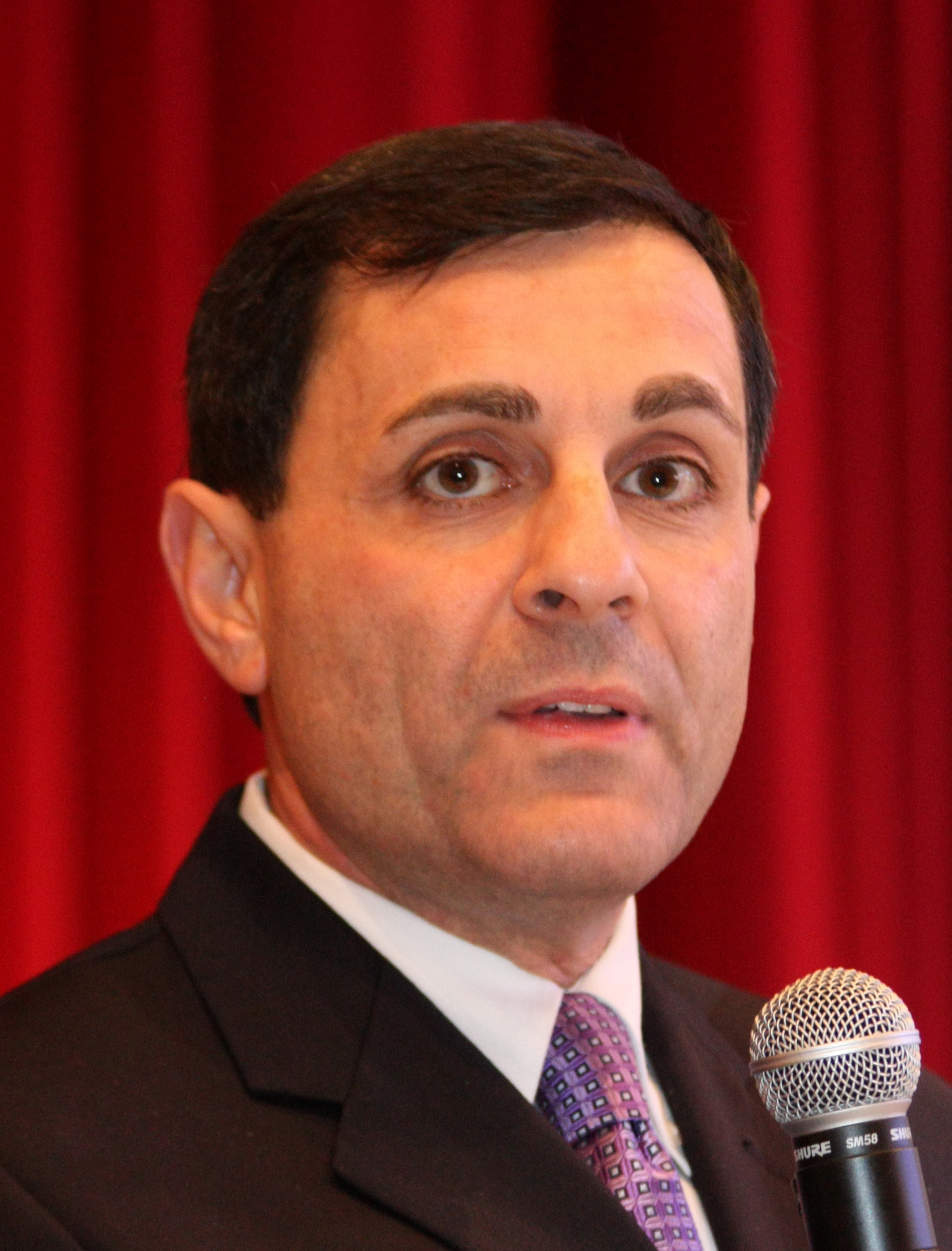
- Mongiardo in 2009

54th Lieutenant Governor of Kentucky
- In office December 11, 2007 – December 13, 2011
- Governor: Steve Beshear
- Preceded by: Steve Pence
- Succeeded by: Jerry Abramson

Member of the Kentucky Senate
- In office January 1, 2001 – December 11, 2007
- Preceded by: Glenn Freeman
- Succeeded by: Brandon Smith
- Constituency: 17th district (2001–2003); 30th district (2003–2007)

Personal details
- Born: July 4, 1960 (age 66) Hazard, Kentucky, U.S.
- Party: Democratic
- Spouse: Allison Patrick
- Education: Transylvania University (BS); University of Kentucky (MD)

Frank Daniel Mongiardo (born July 4, 1960) is an American physician and politician from the Commonwealth of Kentucky. Mongiardo is a Democrat and was the 54th lieutenant governor of Kentucky from 2007 until 2011. He was a member of the Kentucky State Senate from 2001 to 2007. He also ran for the U.S. Senate in 2004, narrowly losing in the general election to Jim Bunning, and again in 2010, losing in the primary election to Jack Conway.

== Personal life and career ==
Mongiardo was born to Italian immigrants in Hazard, Kentucky. His father, Jimmy, owned a whiskey store and coin laundry, for many years, before retiring, and his mother, Katherine, died in 1988 of colon cancer. Mongiardo attended Transylvania University and received his medical degree at the University of Kentucky College of Medicine in 1986. From 1986 to 2000, Mongiardo worked as an ear, nose, and throat surgeon, performing his residency in Lexington. Mongiardo helped open a free health clinic and became chief of staff at the Hazard Appalachian Hospital. He entered politics in 2000 and was elected to the state senate, after defeating incumbent Glenn Freeman in an expensive and bitter Democratic primary with 49.1 percent of the vote and then winning the general election with 70 percent of the vote.

Mongiardo was reelected to a redrawn district in 2002 that covers Bell, Harlan, Leslie, and Perry counties with 65.6 percent of the vote. In this campaign, Mongiardo, argued his opponent, Johnnie Turner, had used images of Mohamed Atta in a television advertisement to compare Atta to him. In the Kentucky Senate, Mongiardo worked to bring water projects to his district, pressed for legislation to establish an electronic medical network, and voted against a constitutional amendment that would allow the legislature to limit the payment of punitive damages in medical malpractice cases. Mongiardo continued his private practice and married Allison Patrick in Covington, Kentucky in 2008. Their first child, Kathryn, was born on December 22, 2009, their second child, Cannon, was born on September 28, 2011, and third child, Barron, was born August 30, 2014.

== 2004 U.S. Senate race ==
Mongiardo ran in the 2004 U.S. Senate election to unseat incumbent first-term Senator Jim Bunning, a former Major League Baseball player. He won the primary election with 64.9 percent of the vote and made health care his top campaign priority. Although early polls showed Mongiardo at a significant disadvantage against Bunning, who had more name recognition and campaign funds, Mongiardo was able to make large gains, on account of several missteps committed by Bunning and other Kentucky Republicans, including Bunning's admission not to have read newspapers articles on the Iraq war and claims made against Mongiardo regarding his staff's violence against Bunning's wife, his sexual preference, and his physical likeness to Saddam Hussein's sons, for the last of which Bunning later apologized. Mongiardo responded with statements about his co-sponsorship of a constitutional amendment banning same-sex marriage in Kentucky and his intent to vote in favor of a Federal Marriage Amendment, and he argued that Bunning was removed from the interests of families. Mongiardo gained support from national Democratic organizations, but he lost the bitterly contested election, 49.3 percent to 50.7 percent. Mongiardo was ahead with as much as 80 percent of the returns in. However, the western portion of the state broke strongly for Bunning, providing the ultimate margin of victory.

== Lieutenant governor ==
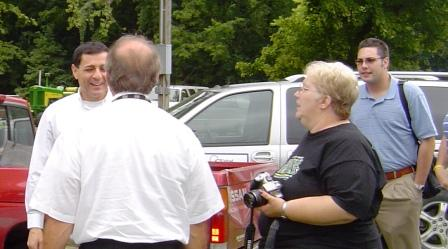
Lt. Gov. Mongiardo greets media while campaigning for Democratic candidates in September 2008.

Former Kentucky Lieutenant Governor Steve Beshear chose Mongiardo as his running mate for the 2007 gubernatorial election in Kentucky. They won the Democratic primary election on May 22, 2007, with 41 percent of the vote against several tickets, including Bruce Lunsford and Greg Stumbo, and Steve Henry and Renee True, and with enough votes to avoid a June runoff. Beshear-Mongiardo were elected over incumbent Republican Governor Ernie Fletcher on November 6, 2007, winning with 58.7 percent of the state vote. Mongiardo did not risk losing his seat in the state senate, because Kentucky holds its constitutional officer elections in odd years.

In September 2008, Mongiardo claimed that some rural voters would not support Barack Obama, because of unfamiliarity with Obama, ignorance, or race. Mongiardo had endorsed Obama, who had supported him in the 2004 U.S. Senate election. Republican Kentucky State Senate President David L. Williams demanded Mongiardo apologize. Mongiardo argued that if Williams suggested racism was not an issue, he was "out of touch."

== 2010 U.S. Senate race ==
In January 2009, Mongiardo announced that he would be running for the U.S. Senate seat currently held by incumbent Jim Bunning. Mongiardo called for Bunning to withdraw from reelection, questioning his ability to represent the state, because of controversial statements made about the health of U.S. Supreme Court Justice Ruth Bader Ginsburg and Bunning's reportedly strained relationship with other Republican senators. Bunning later announced that he would not run in 2010. Mongiardo was narrowly defeated in the Democratic Primary by the Attorney General of Kentucky Jack Conway.

Under a bill changing the selection process of candidates for Lieutenant Governor, which was proposed to the Kentucky House of Representatives, Mongiardo could seek reelection as Lieutenant Governor, even if he lost the Democratic primary to the U.S. Senate in 2010. Governor Steve Beshear, however, privately indicated his desire to assemble his 2011 reelection team prior to the conclusion of the 2010 election cycle. On July 19, 2009, Beshear named Louisville Mayor Jerry Abramson as his running mate in for reelection in 2011.

On January 20, 2009, Mongiardo appeared on the Tonight Show, where he lost an inaugural trivia contest to Hooters girls.

Kentucky Senate
Preceded by Glenn Freeman	Member of the Kentucky Senate from the 17th district 2001–2003	Succeeded by Damon Thayer
Preceded by Ed Miller	Member of the Kentucky Senate from the 30th district 2003–2007	Succeeded by Brandon Smith
Party political offices
Preceded by Scotty Baesler	Democratic nominee for U.S. Senator from Kentucky (Class 3); 2004	Succeeded by Jack Conway
Preceded by Charlie Owen	Democratic nominee for Lieutenant Governor of Kentucky; 2007	Succeeded by Jerry Abramson
Political offices
Preceded by Steve Pence	Lieutenant Governor of Kentucky; 2007–2011	Succeeded by Jerry Abramson
