= Mary Dent Crisp =

American Republican leader and feminist (1923–2007)

- Born: November 5, 1923; Allentown, Pennsylvania
- Died: March 24, 2007 (aged 83)
- Education: Degree in Botany, Oberlin College, 1946 Masters in Political Science, Arizona State University, 1975
- Occupation: Vice-chair of the Mariposa County Republican Committee Vice-chair of Arizona's Republican State Committee Arizona Republican National Committeewoman Secretary of the Republican National Convention Co-Chairwoman of the Republican National Committee Campaign Manager for John Anderson
- Years active: Vice-Chair of the Mariposa County Republican Committee 1968-1970 Vice-Chair of Arizona's Republican State Committee 1971-1972 Arizona Republican National Committeewoman 1972-1976 Secretary of the Republican National Convention 1976-1977 Co-Chairman of the Republican National Committee 1977-1980 Campaign Manager for John Anderson 1980
- Known for: Political and Feminist Activism

Mary Dent Crisp (November 5, 1923 – March 24, 2007) was an American Republican leader and feminist who was ousted from her party after publicly opposing its views on abortion rights and the Equal Rights Amendment. She was a member of the Republican Party for over 20 years and served in roles in the party's administration beginning in 1968, culminating in service from 1977 to 1980 as Co-Chairwoman of the Republican National Committee. Crisp spoke against the party's decision to stop supporting the Equal Rights Amendment in a speech at the 1980 Republican National Convention, after which she announced that she would not seek re-election to her position. Crisp also spoke out in favor of abortion rights.

== Personal life and education ==
Crisp was born on November 5, 1923, in Allentown, Pennsylvania, the 7th child of Elizabeth (Patch) and Harry Dent. In 1946, Crisp graduated with a degree in botany from Oberlin College then studied political science at Arizona State University. In 1948, she married William Crisp. They had three children together, William, Barbara, and Anne. Mary and William divorced in 1976. Mary Dent Crisp had Parkinson's disease and died on March 24, 2007.

== Political life ==
Crisp was active as a volunteer in politics. Her political career began in 1961 as a deputy registrar for the campaign of Barry Goldwater. Following this, Crisp was elected to positions within the Republican Party, serving as vice-chair of the Mariposa County Republican Committee from 1968 to 1970, and as vice-chair of Arizona's Republican State Committee from 1971 to 1972. In 1972 she became a Republican National Committeewoman in Arizona. In 1976 Crisp became Secretary of the Republican National Convention. From 1977 to 1980 she served as Co-Chairwoman of the Republican National Committee.

Crisp directed Business Executives for National Security, a political action committee from 1984 to the mid-1990s.

== Activism ==
In 1977, Crisp wrote to every Republican in Congress in order to gain support for a bill that would extend the ERA ratification deadline. In her speech at the 1980 Republican National Convention, Crisp publicly challenged and spoke against the Republican Party’s decision to abandon the Equal Rights Amendment and support and abandon their anti-abortion platform.

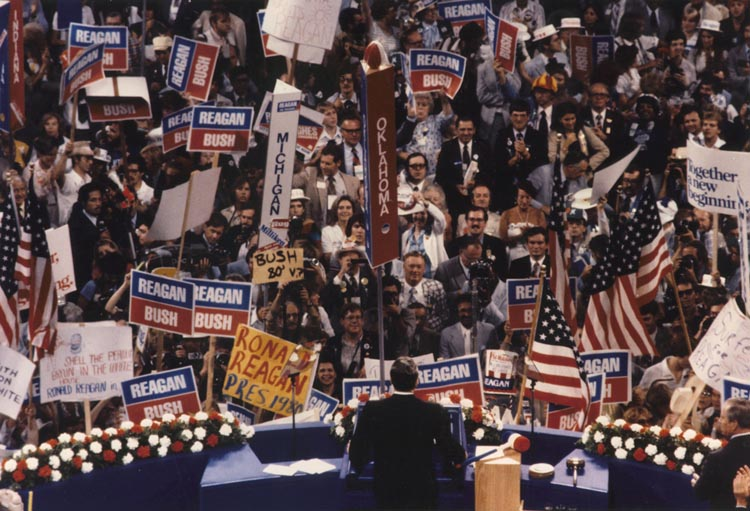
1980 Republican Convention, Crisp later challenged against the Republican Party

After Crisp spoke out against the Republican Party, the party chairman, Bill Brock, told her that “[She] should adopt the lowest profile possible,.” Brock ordered her remarks to be deleted from the program of the national nominating convention, and canceled two convention events that Crisp was supposed to host. Crisp had endorsed an independent Republican John B. Anderson of Illinois for president, but denied endorsing him and arranged with Brock that she would no longer talk to reporters and would not seek re-election of her position. Later, her friends said that Crisp agreed to listen to Brock to protect her staff members from being fired.

Shortly afterward, Crisp signed on as campaign manager for John B. Anderson's 1980 presidential run as an independent. She served on boards for numerous political organizations and "fought to return the Republican Party to what she believed were its ideological roots: individual freedom and limited government". Mary devoted her life as an ardent feminist to "promoting issues of women's freedom, opportunity, choice, and peace".

A supporter of Equal Rights Amendment and abortion rights, Crisp supported pro-choice and women's right to make their own reproductive choices. Crisp also protested the Republican Party's decision to oppose federal funding for abortion. In 1989, the Supreme Court in Webster v. Reproductive Health Services, restricted federal funding for abortion Crisp then left her position under pressure from supporters of President Ronald Reagan. In the same year, Crisp co-founded the National Republican Coalition for Choice, where she served as chair and spokesperson, in response to the government's abandonment of the abortion and equal rights.

In addition, she spoke out for federal support for childcare, redressing gender inequities in Social Security, and against job discrimination.

== Speeches and writings ==
Crisp made numerous speeches on behalf of the Republican National Committee. The target of most of her speeches were Republican organizations. In addition, Crisp gave speeches campaigning for Republican candidates running for office. After leaving the Republican Party, many of Crisp's speeches related to her work for the National Republican Coalition for Choice.

== Office wiretapping incident (June 1980) ==
In June 1980, the Republican National Committee officials investigated with an electronic inspection of their headquarters to see if it had been bugged. The report was inconclusive that Mary Crisp’s office was used in the wiretapping. However, chairman Brill Brock ordered for the investigation to stop after he found out that a police officer had entered the headquarters before they were there. Nothing was found after the search. The police officer had been sent by Winston Norman, who was the chief of security for the Republican national committee. Later, two electronic experts said that a magnetic field and suspicious wires that were found in Mary Crisp’s office could have been for eavesdropping.

== Accolades and credits ==
- Women's Economic Roundtable Advisory Board
- National Women's Political Caucus
- National Advocacy Board of Planned Parenthood
- Trustee for The Thomas Jefferson Center for the Protection of Free Expression
- Honorary Doctor of Law degree from Cedar Crest College in 1981
- Honorary Doctor of Law degree from Oberlin College in 1982
