= Shelley Moore Capito =

American politician (born 1953)

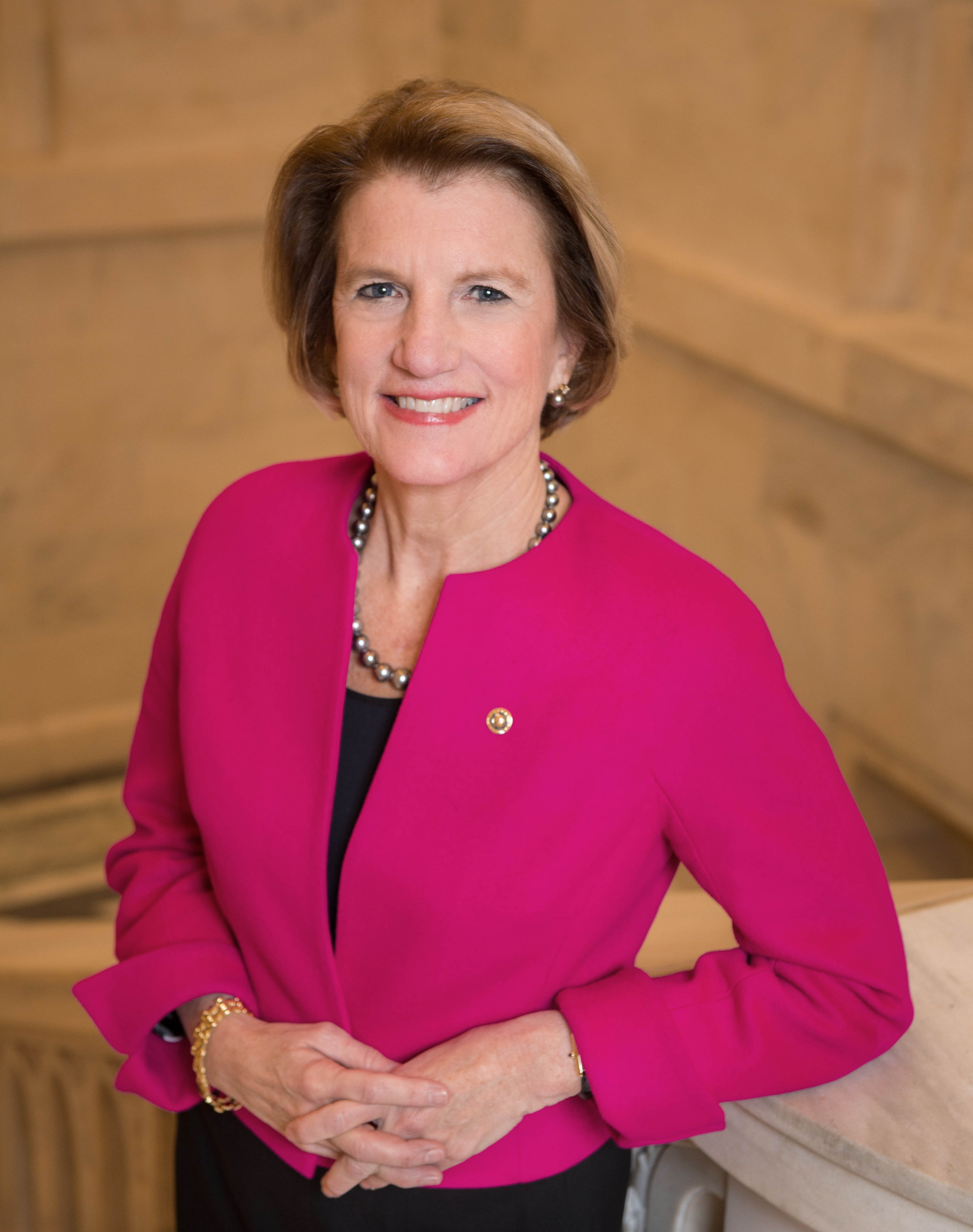
- Official portrait, 2015

United States Senator from West Virginia
- Incumbent
- Assumed office January 3, 2015 Serving with Jim Justice
- Preceded by: Jay Rockefeller
Senate positions
Chair of the Senate Environment Committee
Incumbent
Assumed office January 3, 2025
Preceded by	Tom Carper
Chair of the Senate Republican Policy Committee
Incumbent
Assumed office January 3, 2025
Leader	John Thune
Preceded by	Joni Ernst
Vice Chair of the Senate Republican Conference
In office January 3, 2023 – January 3, 2025
Leader	Mitch McConnell
Preceded by	Joni Ernst
Succeeded by	James Lankford
Ranking Member of the Senate Environment Committee
In office February 3, 2021 – January 3, 2025
Preceded by	Tom Carper
Succeeded by	Sheldon Whitehouse

Member of the U.S. House of Representatives from West Virginia's 2nd district
- In office January 3, 2001 – January 3, 2015
- Preceded by: Bob Wise
- Succeeded by: Alex Mooney

Member of the West Virginia House of Delegates from the 30th district
- In office December 1, 1996 – December 1, 2000
- Preceded by: Multi-member district
- Succeeded by: Multi-member district

Personal details
- Born: Shelley Wellons Moore; November 26, 1953 (age 72) Glen Dale, West Virginia, U.S.
- Party: Republican
- Spouse: Charles Capito (m. 1976)
- Relations: Riley Moore (nephew)
- Children: 3, including Moore
- Parents: Arch Moore (father); Shelley Moore (mother)
- Education: Duke University (BA); University of Virginia (MEd)
- Occupation: Politician; educator
- Website: Senate website Campaign website
- Shelley Moore Capito's voice Capito supporting the Electoral Count Reform Act. Recorded September 27, 2022

Shelley Wellons Moore Capito (/ˈkæpɪtoʊ/ KAP-ih-toh; born November 26, 1953) is an American politician serving as the senior United States senator from West Virginia. A member of the Republican Party, Capito served from 2001 to 2015 as the U.S. representative from West Virginia's 2nd congressional district. She is the daughter of three-term West Virginia governor and six-term U.S. representative Arch Alfred Moore Jr.

Capito was first elected to the Senate in 2014, becoming the first woman elected to the U.S. Senate from West Virginia and the first West Virginia Republican to win a full term in the Senate since 1942. She was reelected in 2020 and 2026.

Capito has chaired the Environment and Public Works Committee since 2025, and is the dean of West Virginia's congressional delegation.

== Early life and education ==
Shelley Wellons Moore Capito was born in Glen Dale, West Virginia, on November 26, 1953. She is the daughter of Shelley (née Riley) and Arch Alfred Moore Jr., who served three terms as the state's governor. A resident of Charleston, Capito was educated at the Holton-Arms School, a private college-preparatory school in Bethesda, Maryland; Duke University, where she earned her bachelor's degree in zoology; and the University of Virginia School of Education and Human Development, where she earned her master's degree. She is a member of Kappa Kappa Gamma sorority and represented West Virginia as the 1972 Cherry Blossom Princess.

== Early career ==
After earning her master's degree, Capito was a career counselor at West Virginia State University and director of the educational information center for the West Virginia Board of Regents.

Capito was elected to Kanawha County's seat in the state House of Delegates in 1996, and served two terms, from 1996 to 2000.

== U.S. House of Representatives ==
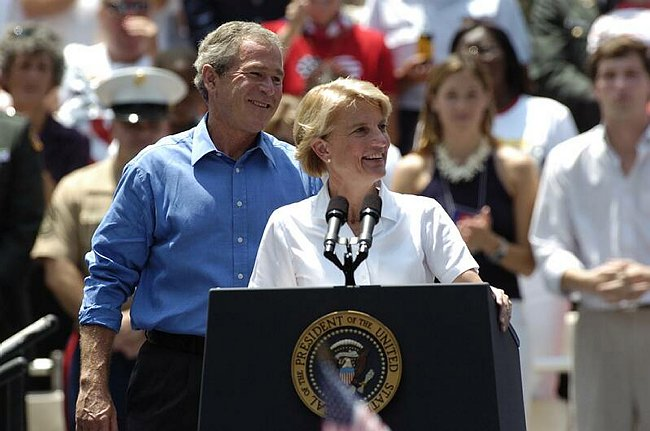
Capito with President George W. Bush in 2004

=== Elections ===
==== 2000 ====
When Democratic U.S. Representative Bob Wise ran for governor in 2000, Capito ran as a Republican for the open seat in West Virginia's 2nd district. She defeated the Democratic nominee, lawyer Jim Humphreys, by two percentage points in an upset. She was the first Republican to represent West Virginia in Congress since 1983, as well as the first woman elected to Congress from West Virginia who was not the widow of a member of Congress.

==== 2002 ====
Capito was reelected, defeating Humphreys again, 60%–40%.

==== 2004 ====
Capito was reelected to a third term, defeating former newscaster Erik Wells 57%–41%.

==== 2006 ====
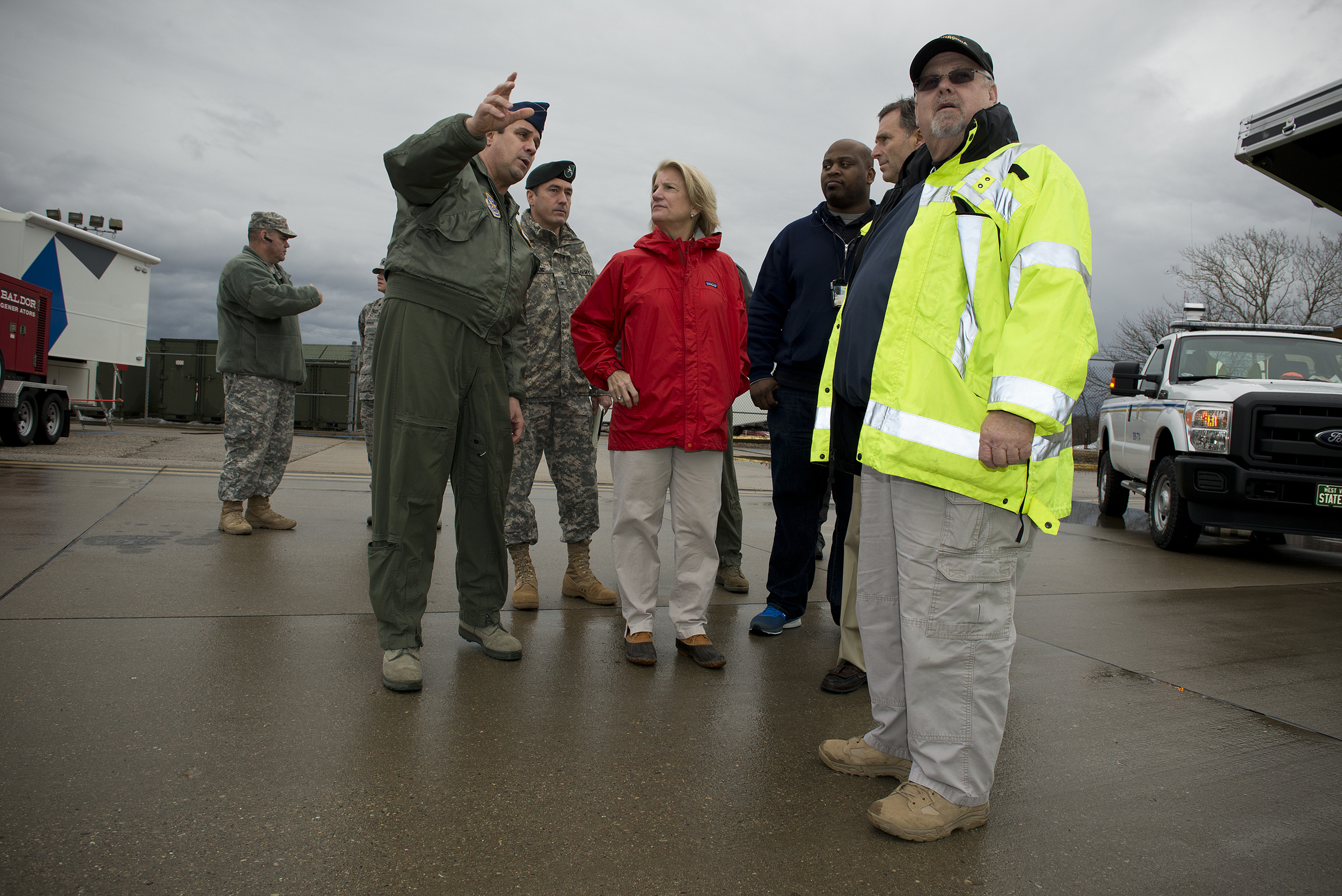
Capito surveys safe drinking water with a FEMA contingent and U.S. Air Force Col. Jerome Gouhin.

Capito was mentioned as a possible challenger to Senator Robert Byrd in 2006, but opted to run for reelection to the House. She was reelected to a fourth term, defeating West Virginia Department of Environmental Protection Secretary Mike Callaghan, 57%–43%.

==== 2008 ====
Capito was reelected to a fifth term, defeating Anne Barth, a former aide to Byrd, 57%–43%.

==== 2010 ====
Capito was mentioned as a possible challenger to Joe Manchin for the vacated United States Senate seat of the late Robert Byrd. She decided against a Senate bid, and was reelected to a sixth term, defeating Virginia Lynch Graf, 68%–30%.

==== 2012 ====
After redistricting, Capito was challenged in the Republican primary. She defeated Delegate Jonathan Miller and Michael Davis. She was reelected to a seventh term, defeating former gubernatorial aide Howard Swint, 70%–30%.

=== Committee assignments ===
- Committee on Financial Services
  - Subcommittee on Financial Institutions and Consumer Credit (chair)
  - Subcommittee on Insurance, Housing and Community Opportunity
- Committee on Transportation and Infrastructure
  - Subcommittee on Highways and Transit
  - Subcommittee on Railroads, Pipelines, and Hazardous Materials
  - Subcommittee on Water Resources and Environment

=== Caucus memberships ===
Capito is a former chair of the Congressional Caucus for Women's Issues and a member of the Congressional Arts Caucus, Rare Disease Caucus, and Afterschool Caucuses. After the Upper Big Branch Mine Disaster, Capito founded the Congressional Coal Caucus.

=== Tenure ===
Capito served on the House Page Board during the Mark Foley congressional page incident, in which Foley, a Republican representative from Florida, sent sexually explicit messages to teenage boys who had previously served as congressional pages. According to Capito, she wasn't aware of Foley's conduct until informed by the press.

== U.S. Senate ==
In the 2014 U.S. Senate election, Capito received a majority of the votes in all 55 counties.

=== Elections ===
==== 2014 ====
On November 26, 2012, Capito announced her candidacy for the United States Senate in 2014, intending to challenge Democratic incumbent Jay Rockefeller, who subsequently announced his retirement. Despite initial protests from Tea Party groups and anti-establishment conservatives that her House voting record was "too liberal", Capito won 87% of the Republican primary vote, and defeated Democratic Secretary of State Natalie Tennant in the general election, 62% to 34%.

==== 2020 ====
In her 2020 reelection campaign, Capito easily defeated Republican primary challengers Allen Whitt and Larry Butcher, before facing Democratic nominee Paula Jean Swearengin in the general election. Swearengin, a progressive activist whose 2018 U.S. Senate campaign was featured in the Netflix documentary Knock Down the House, defeated state senator Richard Ojeda and former South Charleston mayor Richie Robb in the Democratic primary race.

In the November general election, Capito defeated Swearengin with over 70% of the vote.

==== 2026 ====
On May 13, Capito won the Republican nomination, defeating State Senator Tom Willis with 66.5% of the vote. She faced Democratic nominee Rachel Fetty Anderson in the general election. She defeated her opponent with 58.3% of the vote, making her the winner of the election.

=== Tenure ===
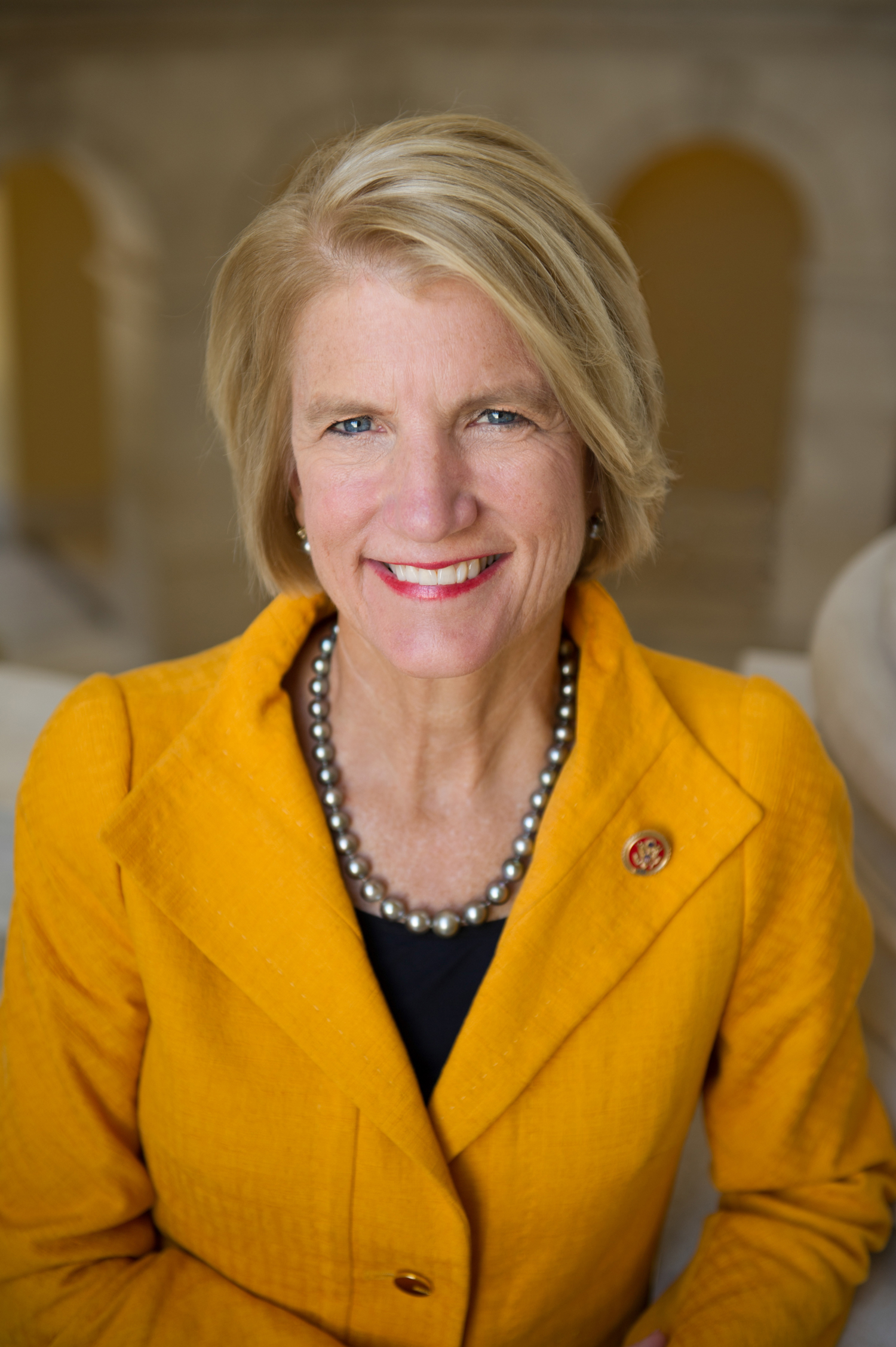
Capito congressional photo 2013

On January 5, 2016, Mitch McConnell appointed Capito as counsel to the majority leader, along with Rob Portman and Deb Fischer.

=== Senate Committee assignments ===
- Committee on Appropriations
  - Subcommittee on Commerce, Justice, Science, and Related Agencies
  - Subcommittee on Defense
  - Subcommittee on Homeland Security
  - Subcommittee on Interior, Environment, and Related Agencies
  - Subcommittee on Labor, Health and Human Services, Education, and Related Agencies (Chair)
  - Subcommittee on Transportation, Housing and Urban Development, and Related Agencies
- Committee on Commerce, Science, and Transportation
  - Subcommittee on Aviation, Space, and Innovation
  - Subcommittee on Telecommunications and Media
  - Subcommittee on Consumer Protection, Technology, and Data Privacy
  - Subcommittee on Surface Transportation, Freight, Pipelines, and Safety
- Committee on Environment and Public Works (Chair)
  - As Chair of the full committee, Sen. Moore Capito is entitled to sit as an ex officio member of all subcommittees.
- Committee on Rules and Administration

=== Caucus memberships ===
- Republican Main Street Partnership
- Senate Taiwan Caucus

== Political positions ==
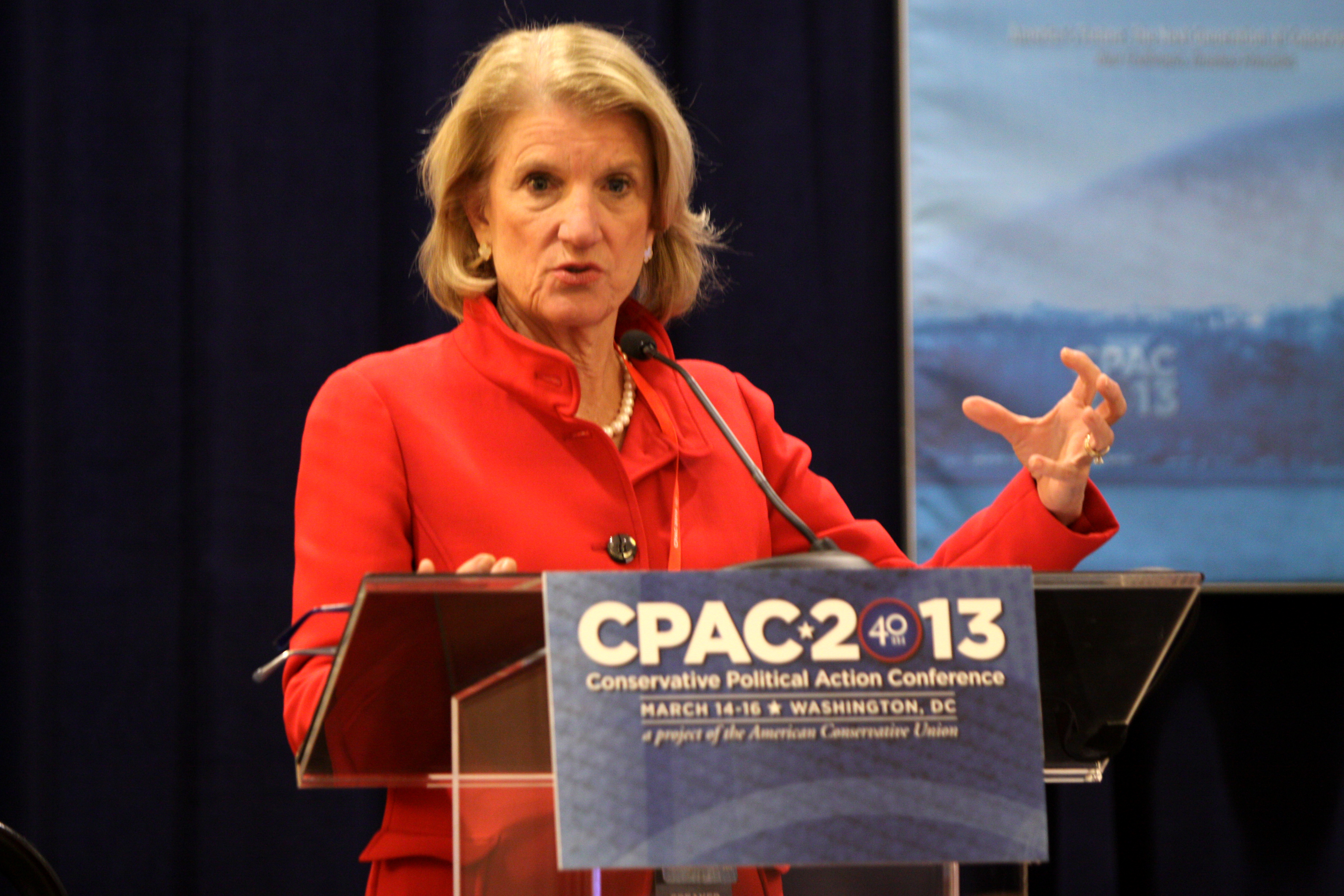
Capito at the Conservative Political Action Conference in 2013

Capito has voted with her party 96% of the time. She is considered relatively moderate and has crossed the aisle on some votes. In 2017, The New York Times and The Washington Post reported that Capito was one of the three most moderate Republican senators according to a study by DW-NOMINATE. In 2023, The Lugar Center and McCourt School of Public Policy ranked Capito in the top fifth among senators for bipartisanship. According to FiveThirtyEight, as of January 2023, Capito had voted with President Biden's position about 56% of the time.

=== Donald Trump's candidacy and presidency ===
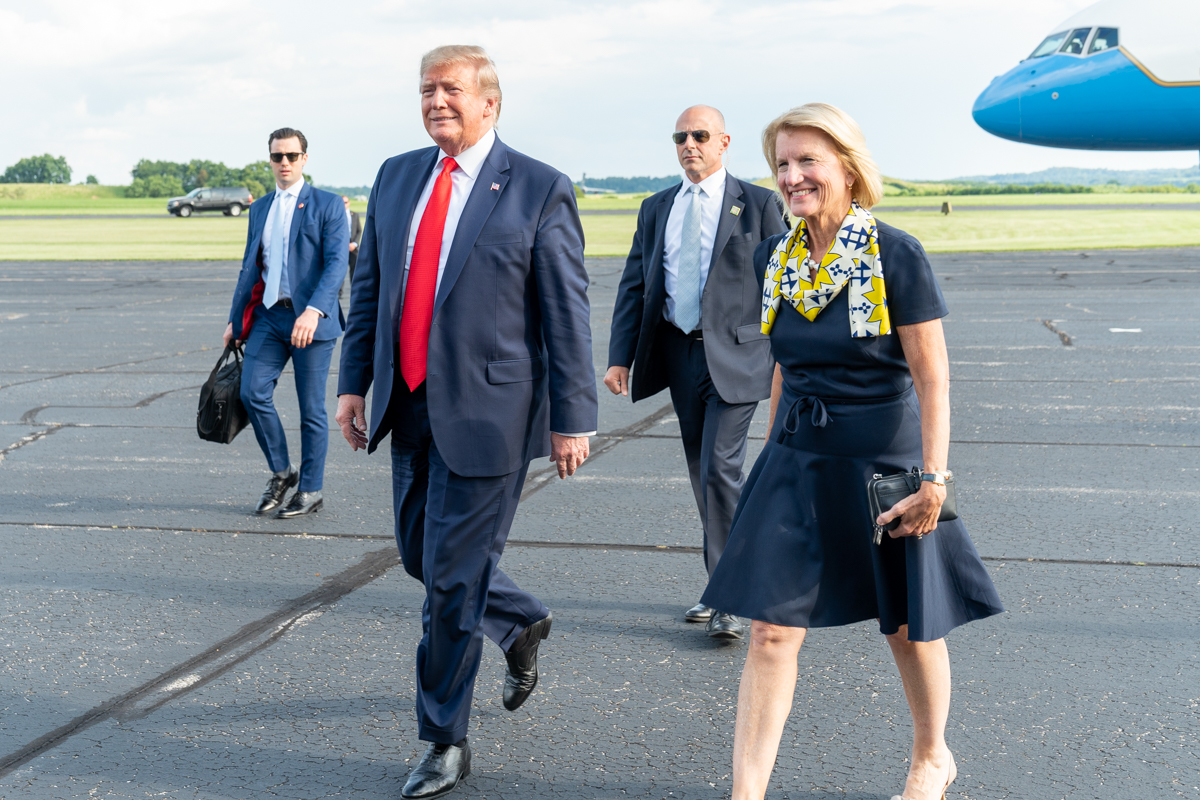
Capito with President Donald Trump in 2019

In 2016, Capito raised concerns about Trump's tone and rhetoric during his presidential campaign. After the Access Hollywood tape emerged, Capito said he should "reexamine his candidacy". But she later said she supported Trump for president. In 2020, Capito said she would be "impartial" and "fair" to both sides during Trump's Senate trial after his second impeachment, and voted to acquit him. According to FiveThirtyEight, she had voted with the Trump administration's position 94.9% of the time.

As of November 19, 2020, Capito had not publicly acknowledged that Joe Biden won the 2020 presidential election, though it had been called by all major media and analysts. By November 23, she issued a statement recognizing that Biden would be the next president. By December 5, she was among only 27 congressional Republicans to acknowledge Biden as the winner of the election. Trump subsequently attacked them, calling them RINOs.

On May 28, 2021, Capito voted against creating the January 6 commission. Asked about Trump's future role in the Republican Party, she said she partially blamed him for the "insurrection" and did not think he would be the Republican nominee for president in 2024. Capito eventually endorsed Trump in the 2024 election.

=== Social policy ===
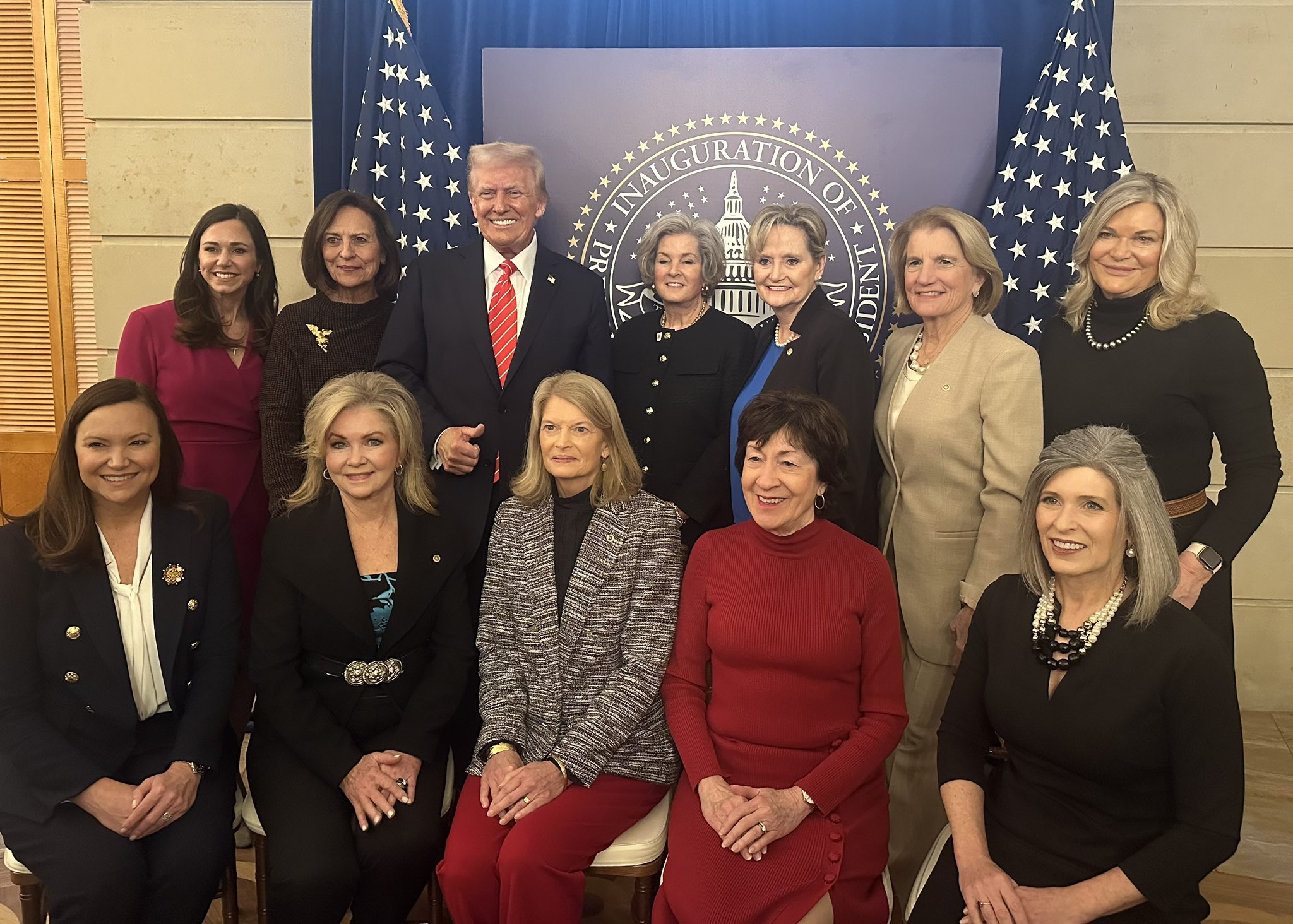
Capito and the female Republican Senators with President Trump and the first-female chief of staff, Susie Wiles, 2025

Capito is a sponsor of the Gender Advancement in Pay (GAP) Act, saying "it should be common sense that women and men get equal pay for equal work" and expressing concern about sex discrimination against women in the workplace. She is a sponsor of the Rural Access to Hospice Act to improve the quality, access, and retention of hospice facilities in rural parts of the nation. She opposes the Freedom to Vote Act which, among other reforms, would establish Election Day as a public holiday and "ensure states have early voting for federal elections, overhaul how congressional districts are redrawn and impose new disclosures on donations to outside groups active in political campaigns." On social policy, the National Journal gave Capito a score of 54% conservative and 43% liberal.

==== LGBT rights ====
Capito has a mixed record on LGBT issues. The Human Rights Campaign gave her a score of 30% in the 113th Congress and 64% in the 114th Congress. She received a 0% score in the 115th Congress and a 10% score in the 116th Congress.

In 2004 and 2006, Capito voted for the Federal Marriage Amendment, which intended to ban same-sex marriage in the United States. But in 2015, she said she believed marriage was a state issue. In 2007 Capito voted against the Employment Non-Discrimination Act and against repealing the Don't Ask Don't Tell policy.

In 2009, Capito voted for the 2009–2010 Defense Appropriations bill, which expanded the legal definition of a hate crime to include crimes committed because of someone's gender identity. Also that year, she voted against legislation that defined hate crimes as including those committed because of someone's sexual orientation. In 2013, she voted to reauthorize the Violence Against Women Act, which includes provisions to assist victims regardless of sexual orientation or gender identity and prohibits funding programs that discriminate.

In 2015, Capito voted for an amendment to the Runaway and Homeless Youth Act that provided support and protections for LGBT youth. In 2015, she voted to give same-sex married couples access to Social Security and veterans' benefits. In 2017, Capito disagreed with President Trump's use of Twitter to announce a ban on transgender troops in the military, saying, "we should be thankful for any American who selflessly serves our country to defend our freedoms." In 2021, she released a statement that she opposed the inclusion of trans youth in the sporting programs of their gender identity; in particular, she opposed the inclusion of trans girls in girls' sporting teams and introduced legislation to ban trans girls from participating.

In response to the Supreme Court's decision in Obergefell v. Hodges, which found a constitutional right to same-sex marriage, Capito said, "While I would have preferred that the Supreme Court leave this decision to the states, it is my hope that all West Virginians will move forward and continue to care for and respect one another." In November 2022, Capito was one of 12 Republicans voting to advance legislation, the Respect for Marriage Act, to codify same-sex marriage into federal law; referring to civil same-sex marriage as a "civil partnership," Capito said that the "legislation will allow those who have entered into a civil partnership since the Supreme Court’s 2015 ruling in Obergefell v. Hodges, to continue to have their partnerships respected for federal benefit purposes." She voted for the final passage of the Respect for Marriage Act on November 29, 2022.

==== Abortion ====
Capito had described herself as "pro-choice," or pro-abortion rights, but has a mixed record on abortion. She had previously been among the few Republican senators who publicly supported Roe v. Wade, the U.S. Supreme Court decision ruling abortion bans unconstitutional. But in 2020, she declared her support for March for Life, an anti-abortion movement, and in 2022, she reversed her position on Roe, saying she believes states should be free to ban abortion. She supports legal abortion in cases when the pregnant patient's health is at risk and said abortions should be rare. She has mixed ratings from anti-abortion organizations opposing abortion and abortion rights organizations advocating legal abortion. In 2002, her third-largest contributor was The WISH List, an abortion rights PAC. In 2000, she received support from Republicans for Choice. She has been endorsed by West Virginians for Life, an anti-abortion PAC, the WISH List, and by Republican Majority for Choice, an abortion rights PAC.

Capito voted against federal funding for abortion and for the Partial-Birth Abortion Ban Act, but against banning family-planning funding in US aid. She previously opposed the Hyde Amendment, but now supports it. She supported federal funding for family planning in the House but voted to require parental consent for minors seeking an abortion. She opposed banning funds for mifepristone, the "abortion pill". She voted for spending bills funding Planned Parenthood and against a bill to defund it, but has also voted to defund Planned Parenthood. She is against bans on abortion after six weeks of pregnancy, but supports banning abortion after 20 weeks. She voted with her party in 2018 to ban federal funding for facilities that promote abortion. Capito supports other anti-abortion legislation supported by her party. In 2021, she signed a letter put forward by the Senate's anti-abortion caucus opposing the repeal of the Hyde Amendment and opposing legislation to liberalize current federal abortion laws.

In 2017, "West Virginians for Life, said [it] still supports Capito, despite the abortion rights self-identification and support for Roe v. Wade, because of Capito's steadfast voting record restricting abortions and defunding Planned Parenthood". In 2018, Capito said she was neutral on an initiative to ban abortion in West Virginia. She supported Trump's Supreme Court nominee Brett Kavanaugh; when asked about Roe, Capito said she does not think the court will overturn the ruling. "Fundamentally, it's been a precedent for a long time," she said. Capito also supported Trump's nomination of Amy Coney Barrett to the Supreme Court. Barrett signed a letter calling for the end of Roe v. Wade, and supported a group that holds that life begins at fertilization. In 2020, Capito declined to sign an amicus brief asking the Supreme Court to reconsider Roe. Also in 2021, she was one of just three Senate Republicans (with Susan Collins and Lisa Murkowski) to decline to sign amicus briefs in the Mississippi case that seeks to ban abortion after 15 weeks of pregnancy. Asked about a 2022 draft Supreme Court opinion that would overturn Roe v. Wade, reportedly joined by Barrett, Kavanaugh, and Neil Gorsuch, all of whom Capito voted to confirm, she responded by criticizing the leak of the draft and said, "this is a draft opinion that is not binding Supreme Court precedent. Roe still remains the law of the land until the Supreme Court issues its final ruling." After the Supreme Court overturned Roe in the Dobbs v. Jackson Women's Health Organization decision, Capito said she supported the court's decision and believed the issue should be decided at the state level. In September 2022, Capito said she was opposed to a national 15-week abortion ban proposed by Senator Lindsey Graham of South Carolina.

==== Sexual assault ====
Capito is partnering with Democrats Kirsten Gillibrand, Patty Murray, Amy Klobuchar and other bipartisan members of Congress to update the Congressional Accountability Act of 1995. In August 2018, She and Senator Joe Manchin announced $899,927 for the West Virginia Foundation for Rape Information and Services through the U.S. Department of Justice's Office on Violence Against Women.

==== Embryonic stem-cell research ====
Capito supports embryonic stem cell research. In 2001, Capito voted for a bill to ban the cloning of human embryos. In May 2005, as a representative, Capito broke with her party, voting with a majority of Democrats, to repeal restrictions on embryonic stem-cell research funding. Capito also voted in 2006 to attempt to override President Bush's veto of the 2005 bill. Also in 2007, Capito again voted in favor of funding stem-cell research. She also voted in favor of research using stem cells derived from donated embryos. In 2009, Capito voted for a budget bill that prohibited the creation of human embryos for research.

==== Gun rights ====
Capito was endorsed by the NRA Political Victory Fund and West Virginia Citizen's Defense League which both support gun owners' rights in 2014. In 2016, she voted in favor of alerting law enforcement when a person suspected of terrorism attempts to purchase a firearm and in favor of an amendment to improve the National Instant Background Check System, but she voted against two other gun control amendments. In 2018, Capito opposed President Trump's suggestion that teachers be armed, saying, "I don't think a teacher should carry a gun in a classroom." In January 2019, she was one of 31 Republican senators to cosponsor the Constitutional Concealed Carry Reciprocity Act, a bill introduced by John Cornyn and Ted Cruz that would grant individuals with concealed carry privileges in their home state the right to exercise this right in any other state with concealed carry laws while concurrently abiding by that state's laws. Capito said she was open to supporting red flag laws. As of 2020, the NRA has given her a rating of 92%, for supporting their positions, and Gun Owners of America gives her a 69% rating.

==== Healthcare ====
As a representative, Capito opposed the Affordable Care Act (also known as Obamacare) and has since voted repeatedly to repeal it. In July 2017, Capito opposed repealing the ACA without a replacement proposal, and was one of three Republican senators, along with Susan Collins and Lisa Murkowski, who blocked a bill to repeal the ACA without a replacement early in the attempted repeal process. Later that July, she voted to repeal the ACA.

Capito was one of a few Republicans who broke with their party in favor of the State Children's Health Insurance Program. In January 2009, she voted to expand the Children's Health Insurance Program (CHIP) as part of its reauthorization. The expanded coverage would include about four million more children in the program. In May 2008, Capito voted for the Post-9/11 Veterans Educational Assistance Act of 2008 (commonly called the new G.I. Bill), which expanded the educational benefits for military veterans who have served since September 11, 2001. During the 112th Congress, she voted for H.R. 525 to expand the ACA grant programs. In 2014, she supported repealing the Affordable Care Act.

On March 3, 2017, Capito supported preserving the ACA's Medicaid expansion in any GOP bill to repeal it . With three other Republicans, she signed a letter opposing the House plan to repeal the ACA. She opposed the Better Care Reconciliation Act because of her opposition to an amendment to the bill as well as over opioid issues. She was one of seven Republicans who voted against repealing the ACA without a replacement.

In 2018, Capito voted for the bipartisan Opioid Crisis Response Act to address the nation's opioid crisis. She also voted to increase Telemedicine funding in five West Virginia counties.

In January 2019, Capito cosponsored the Community Health Investment, Modernization, and Excellence (CHIME) Act, a bipartisan bill that would continue federal funding of community health centers and the National Health Service Corps (NHSC) beyond that year's September 30 deadline for five years and provide both with yearly federal funding increases beginning in fiscal year 2020. In 2021, she announced support for increasing funding for virtual healthcare options, and she co-sponsored bipartisan legislation to expand seniors' access to Telehealth, with "virtual [healthcare] visits." She supports extending Medicare to cover therapies to prevent diabetes.

In 2024, Capito led a bill to create an advisory council to support research, care, and services to find a cure for Parkinson’s disease.

==== Immigration ====
Capito has said that she does not support a pathway to citizenship for undocumented immigrants, but voted against a 2004 bill that would have forced hospitals to report undocumented immigrants; she also voted for a 2001 bill to allow some immigrants to "remain in the country while pursuing residency". In 2010, she voted against the DREAM Act. In 2018, Capito said of DACA and immigration, "It's probably going to be some sort of legal status for DACA recipients that gives them the permanence of legal status and then the border security". Of her views on DACA, Capito's office said that she "could support an immigration solution that provides for increased border security to protect Americans and provides relief for those in the DACA program. She is encouraged by ongoing negotiations between the Trump Administration and members of Congress to improve immigration policy and add resources for enforcement."

In 2018, Capito voted to withhold federal funding from sanctuary cities, voted against the McCain-Coons proposal to offer a pathway to citizenship without funding for a border wall, against Senator Collins's bipartisan bill to increase funding for border security and offer a pathway to citizenship, and in favor of Trump's proposal to offer a pathway to citizenship for 1.8 million undocumented immigrants while reducing legal immigration numbers and using federal funds to build a border wall. In December 2018, Capito supported a bipartisan compromise funding bill that would have allocated $1.6 billion, instead of the $5 billion Trump requested, for a border wall to avoid a government shutdown.

Capito voiced disagreement with Trump's "zero-tolerance" policy that included separating children from their parents or guardians. She said, "we need to keep the families together". In 2019, she supported legislation to increase funding and humanitarian aid for "relief and comfort for migrants" on the US southern border. She also voted in committee for a bipartisan plan with $4.6 billion in funding with "$2.9 billion for the care of migrant children and $1.3 billion to improve facilities at the border".

Special interest groups for and against immigration reform have given Capito mixed ratings. NumbersUSA, which opposes illegal immigration and seeks to reduce legal immigration, gave her an 81% score and the Federation for American Immigration Reform, which also opposes illegal immigration and wants to reduce legal immigration, gave her an 88% score; conversely, the Hispanic Federation and UnidosUS, which both support immigration, gave Capito a 59% rating.

==== Drug policy ====
Capito disagreed with U.S. Attorney General Jeff Sessions's 2018 memo on marijuana-related prosecutions, saying, "I'm going to go on the record as saying I'm against recreational marijuana, but I respect the states' rights to make that decision". She also said that she had concerns, but accepted and supported the legalization of medical marijuana.

==== Environmental policy ====
Capito has received at lifetime rating of 17% from the League of Conservation Voters, indicating an anti-environment voting record. In 2018, she voted for a bill that would curtail the federal government's ability to regulate fracking. She has also voted to restrict the Department of the Interior's ability to regulate methane emissions.

In February 2019, in response to reports of the EPA intending to decide against setting drinking water limits for perfluorooctane sulfonic acid (PFOS) and perfluorooctanoic acid (PFOA) as part of an upcoming national strategy to manage the aforementioned class of chemicals, Capito was one of 20 senators to sign a letter to Acting EPA Administrator Andrew R. Wheeler calling on the EPA "to develop enforceable federal drinking water standards for PFOA and PFOS, as well as institute immediate actions to protect the public from contamination from additional per- and polyfluoroalkyl substances (PFAS)." In 2020, she cosponsored legislation with fellow West Virginia Senator Joe Manchin to "enhance a tax credit that Congress expanded in 2018 to spur investment in carbon capture technology."

=== Foreign policy ===
Capito has sponsored approximately 40 bills about international trade and international finance, the most of any other legislative topic during her career. She criticized the vulnerabilities in national security policy in the wake of the 2015 San Bernardino attack and has sponsored eight bills on the military and national security. Capito was one of 47 Republican senators to sign Senator Tom Cotton's open letter to the Iranian government in 2015. The letter, which sought to dissuade Iran from reaching an agreement with President Barack Obama on nuclear peace, was described by the White House as "undercutting foreign policy".

In April 2017, Capito co-sponsored the Israel Anti-Boycott Act (S. 720), which would make it a federal crime for Americans to encourage or participate in boycotts against Israel and Israeli settlements in the occupied Palestinian territories if protesting actions by the Israeli government.

On foreign policy, the National Journal gave her a score of 77% conservative and 15% liberal.

==== International trade ====
In 2005, Capito voted against the Dominican Republic–Central America Free Trade Agreement (CAFTA), the major trade agreement negotiated under President George W. Bush. In 2003, 2004, and 2007, she voted to approve free trade agreements with Chile, Singapore, Australia, and Peru. She supports tariffs against countries that manipulate currencies, and she sponsored a bill that would create an import fee on countries with an undervalued currency.

=== Interior policy ===
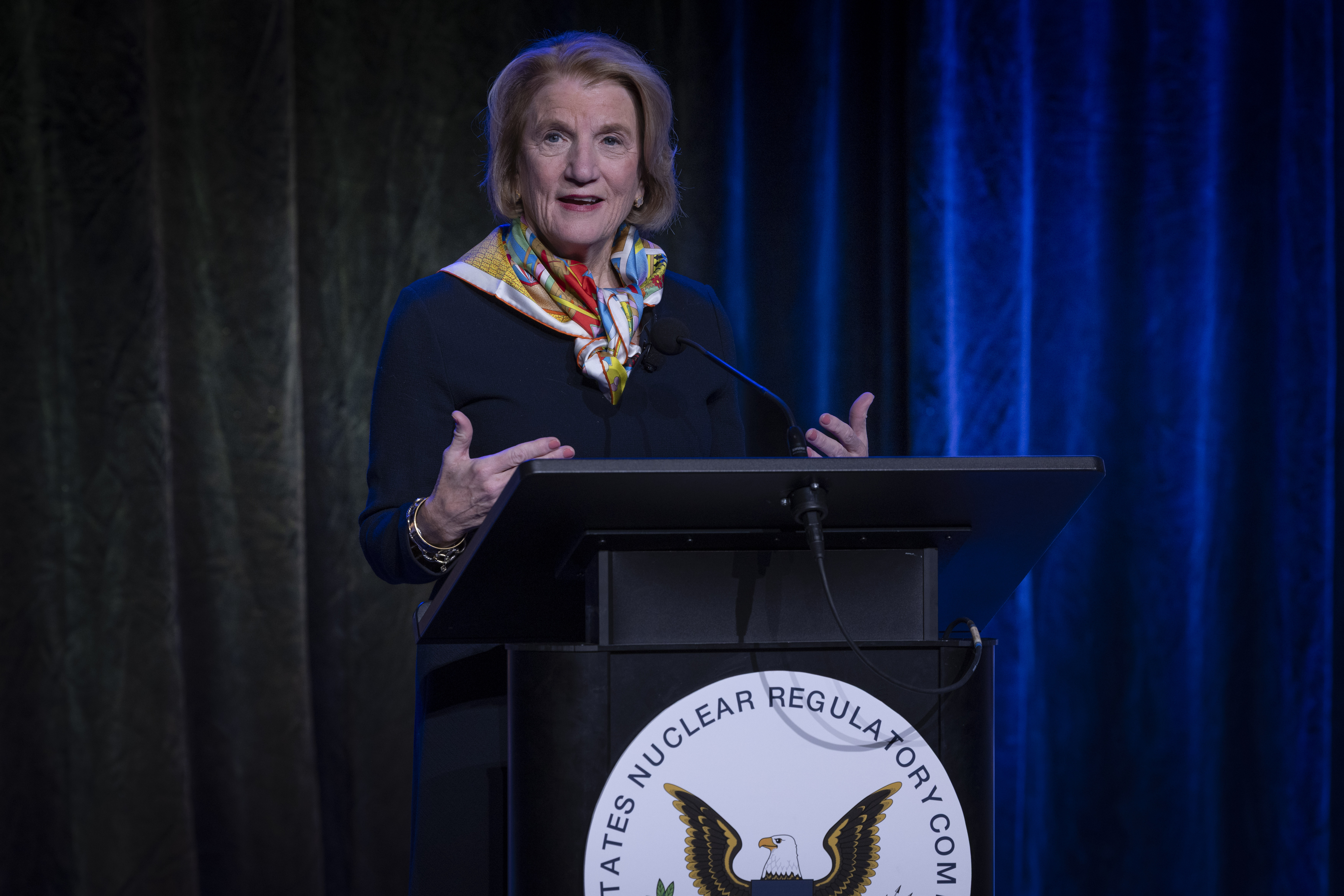
Capito speaks at the 2025 Nuclear Regulatory Commission Regulatory Information Conference

Capito supports the Republican Main Street Partnership's motion to elevate the EPA to be a Cabinet-level department, which would bring more oversight to the entity.

Capito opposes legislation aimed at capping greenhouse gas emissions. In January 2010, she reportedly asked the president if he would reconsider "job-killing" policies like limiting greenhouse gases.

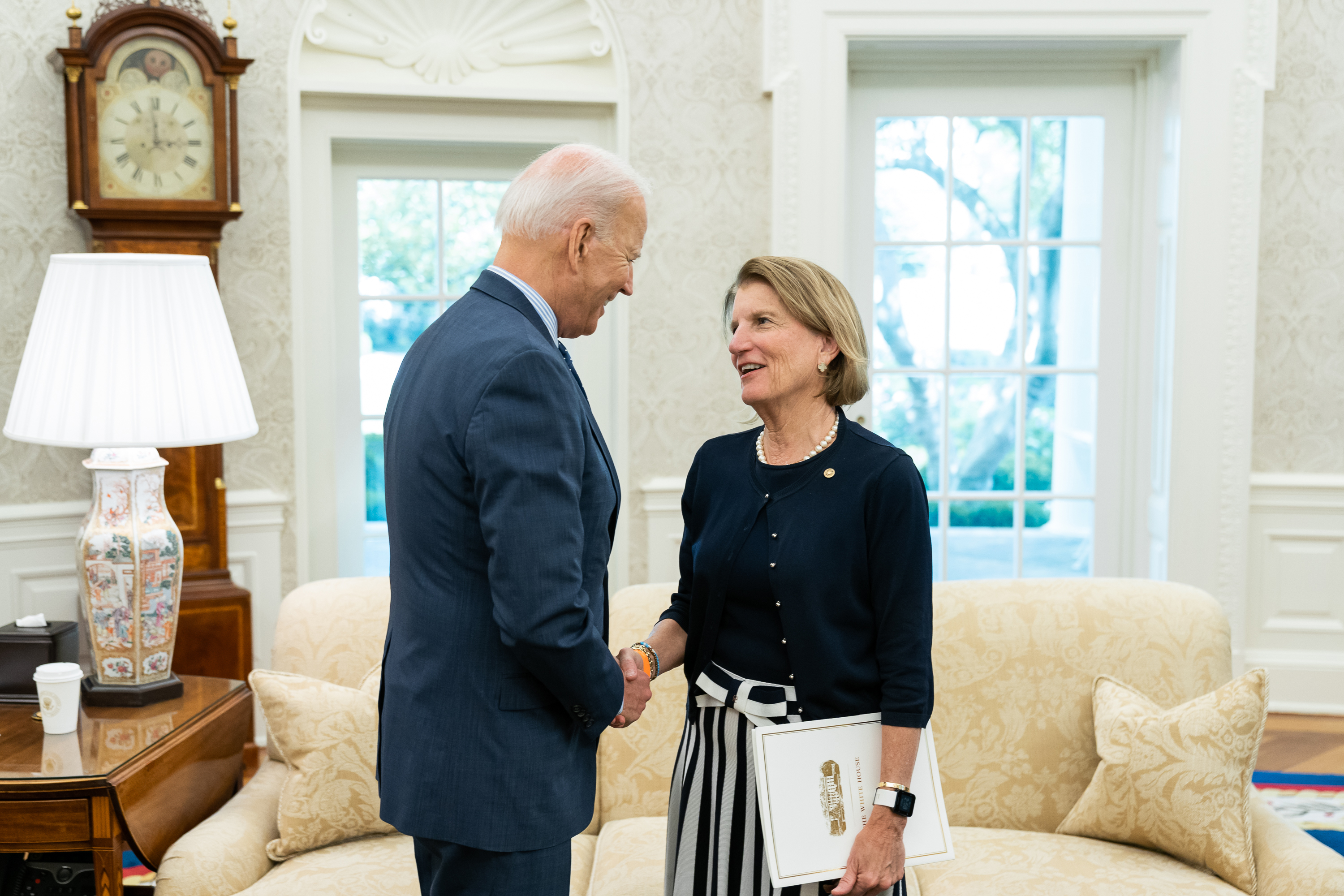
Capito meets with President Joe Biden in the Oval Office during discussions about an infrastructure bill, 2021.

In March 2011, Capito and other members of West Virginia's House delegation co-sponsored a campaign to allow the remains of the last American living veteran of World War I, Frank Buckles, to lie in state at the Capitol rotunda. The move, requested by Buckles's family, had been blocked by Senate Majority Leader Harry Reid and House Speaker John Boehner. Reid and Boehner supported a special ceremony at the Arlington National Cemetery. Capito said, "This is a matter close to the hearts of many West Virginians, but everyone can appreciate the desire to come together one last time to respect and remember America’s last doughboy". The campaign was unsuccessful and Buckles lay in honor at the Arlington National Cemetery.

Capito supported Trump's decision to withdraw from the Paris climate agreement. She called the decision "the right decision for the American economy and workers in West Virginia and across the country." She supports regulations implemented by the EPA, based on her bipartisan legislation, to increase clean water standards.

In March 2023, Capito introduced the Accelerating Deployment of Versatile, Advanced Nuclear for Clean Energy (ADVANCE) Act of 2023 in support of generation IV reactor technology and nuclear development in general. The ADVANCE Act was incorporated into the Fire Grants and Safety Act and signed into law in July 2024.

=== Fiscal policy ===
In 2016, the fiscally conservative PAC the Club for Growth gave her a 50% lifetime rating. In 2011, while in the House, Capito voted for a Balanced Budget Amendment to the United States Constitution. In 2020, she said she opposed cuts to government spending, but also opposed any increases.

In December 2010, Capito voted to extend the tax cuts enacted during the administration of President George W. Bush.

Capito supports a federal prohibition on online poker. In 2006, she cosponsored H.R. 4777, the Internet Gambling Prohibition and Enforcement Act. She also supported H.R. 4411, the Goodlatte-Leach Internet Gambling Prohibition Act. In June 2003, Capito introduced the Family Fairness in Taxing Act of 2003, which would accelerate the increase to the child tax credit, increase the qualification age for children, and revise refundability criteria for the credit.

In 2001, Capito voted in favor of the Bush tax cuts. In 2002, she supported partially privatizing Social Security but opposed complete privatization. In 2006, Capito joined Democrats to vote for an increase of the minimum wage. In 2012, during her campaign for the Senate, the Senate Conservative Fund opposed her nomination because "her spending record in the House is too liberal". In 2013, she voted against cutting funding for food stamps. In 2017, Capito opposed President Trump's proposed budget, saying that it would cut "too close to the bone". In 2017, she said she supported full repeal of the inheritance tax. She also voted in favor of Trump's tax cut bill. In 2019, she came out against budget cuts proposed by the Trump administration. Capito was among a few Republicans, including Joni Ernst of Iowa and Susan Collins of Maine, to express criticism of Trump's nominee to the Federal Reserve, Stephen Moore, because of comments he had made about women; he ultimately withdrew the nomination. In 2019, Capito announced support for paid family leave. In 2020, she opposed budget cuts due to the "spending needs" of states like West Virginia. On September 30, 2021, she was among 15 Senate Republicans to vote with all Democrats and both Independents for a temporary spending bill to avoid a government shutdown. On October 7, 2021, she was one of 11 Republicans voting with all members of the Democratic caucus to end a filibuster on raising the debt ceiling, but voted against the bill to raise the debt ceiling. On August 10, 2021, Capito was one of 19 Senate Republicans to vote with the Democratic caucus in favor of the Infrastructure Investment and Jobs Act. On economic issues, the National Journal gave her a rating of 53% conservative and 47% liberal.

=== Judiciary ===
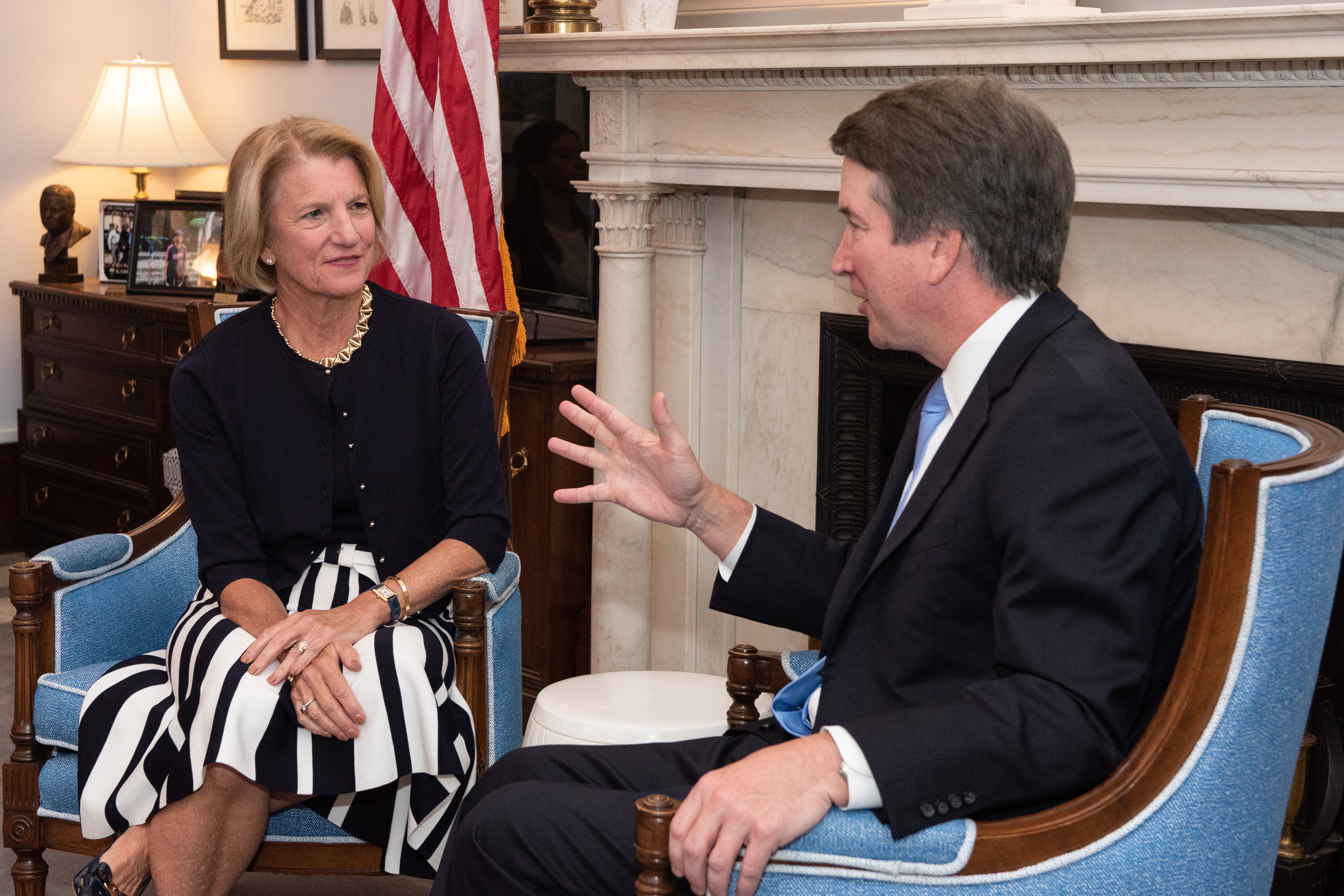
Capito meets with Supreme Court nominee Judge Brett Kavanaugh, July 2018

Capito opposed having a hearing for President Obama's nominee, Merrick Garland, to the Supreme Court due to the nomination's proximity to the 2016 presidential election. In 2017, she voted to confirm President Trump's first Supreme Court nominee, Neil Gorsuch. After Trump nominated a second justice, Capito announced her support for the nominee, Brett Kavanaugh, and after he was accused of sexual assault, she continued to support his nomination. But she also said she considered the allegation serious and was among a handful of Republican senators to ask for a vote to be delayed in order to hear from the accuser and from Kavanaugh. Some of her fellow alumnae from the Holton-Arms School personally delivered her a letter signed by more than a thousand alumnae of the school, saying that they believe Kavanaugh's accuser because her allegations are "all too consistent with stories we heard and lived" while attending Holton-Arms.

In March 2019, Capito was one of 12 senators to cosponsor a resolution that would impose a constitutional amendment limiting the Supreme Court to nine justices. The resolution was introduced after multiple Democratic presidential candidates expressed openness to the idea of expanding the seats on the Supreme Court.

In September 2020, less than two months before the next presidential election, Capito supported an immediate vote on Trump's nominee to fill the Supreme Court vacancy caused by Justice Ruth Bader Ginsburg's death. In March 2016, she took the opposite position when facing Obama's nominee, saying that a justice should not be considered during a presidential election year because "West Virginians and the American people should have the ability to weigh in at the ballot box". As of November 2021, Capito had a mixed voting record on Biden's judicial nominees.

== Vice presidential speculation ==
Capito was considered a possible contender for vice president on the Republican ticket with Donald Trump in 2016, and in May 2016 she was one of several senators to meet with Trump in Washington, D.C. In the end, Trump picked Indiana Governor and former U.S. Representative Mike Pence to join him on the Republican ticket.

== Electoral history ==
West Virginia's 2nd congressional district election, 2000
Primary election
Party	Candidate	Votes	%
Republican	Shelley Moore Capito	33,667	100.00
Total votes		33,667	100.00
General election
Republican	Shelley Moore Capito	108,769	48.49
Democratic	Jim Humphreys	103,003	45.92
Libertarian	John Brown	12,543	5.59
Total votes		224,315	100.00
Republican gain from Democratic			

West Virginia's 2nd congressional district election, 2002
Primary election
Party	Candidate	Votes	%
Republican	Shelley Moore Capito (incumbent)	32,655	100.00
Total votes		32,655	100.00
General election
Republican	Shelley Moore Capito (incumbent)	98,276	60.04
Democratic	Jim Humphreys	65,400	39.96
Total votes		163,676	100.00
Republican hold			

West Virginia's 2nd congressional district election, 2004
Primary election
Party	Candidate	Votes	%
Republican	Shelley Moore Capito (incumbent)	40,985	100.00
Total votes		40,985	100.00
General election
Republican	Shelley Moore Capito (incumbent)	147,676	57.46
Democratic	Erik Wells	106,131	41.29
Mountain	Julian Martin	3,218	1.25
Total votes		257,025	100.00
Republican hold			

West Virginia's 2nd congressional district election, 2006
Primary election
Party	Candidate	Votes	%
Republican	Shelley Moore Capito (incumbent)	29,031	100.00
Total votes		29,031	100.00
General election
Republican	Shelley Moore Capito (incumbent)	94,110	57.18
Democratic	Mike Callaghan	70,470	42.82
Total votes		164,580	100.00
Republican hold			

West Virginia's 2nd congressional district election, 2008
Primary election
Party	Candidate	Votes	%
Republican	Shelley Moore Capito (incumbent)	42,476	100.00
Total votes		42,476	100.00
General election
Republican	Shelley Moore Capito (incumbent)	147,334	57.07
Democratic	Anne Barth	110,819	42.92
Write-in		16	0.01
Total votes		258,169	100.00
Republican hold			

West Virginia's 2nd congressional district election, 2010
Primary election
Party	Candidate	Votes	%
Republican	Shelley Moore Capito (incumbent)	27,958	100.00
Total votes		27,958	100.00
General election
Republican	Shelley Moore Capito (incumbent)	126,814	68.46
Democratic	Virginia Lynch Graf	55,001	29.69
Constitution	Phil Hudok	3,431	1.85
Total votes		185,246	100.00
Republican hold			

West Virginia's 2nd congressional district election, 2012
Primary election
Party	Candidate	Votes	%
Republican	Shelley Moore Capito (incumbent)	35,088	82.96
Republican	Jonathan Miller	4,711	11.14
Republican	Michael Davis	2,495	5.90
Total votes		42,294	100.00
General election
Republican	Shelley Moore Capito (incumbent)	158,206	69.77
Democratic	Howard Swint	68,560	30.23
Total votes		226,766	100.00
Republican hold			

2014 United States Senate election in West Virginia
Primary election
Party	Candidate	Votes	%
Republican	Shelley Moore Capito	74,655	87.50
Republican	Matthew Dodrill	7,072	8.29
Republican	Larry Butcher	3,595	4.21
Total votes		85,322	100.00
General election
Republican	Shelley Moore Capito	281,820	62.12
Democratic	Natalie Tennant	156,360	34.47
Libertarian	John Buckley	7,409	1.63
Mountain	Bob Henry Baber	5,504	1.21
Constitution	Phil Hudok	2,566	0.57
Total votes		453,658	100.00
Republican gain from Democratic			

2020 United States Senate election in West Virginia
Primary election
Party	Candidate	Votes	%
Republican	Shelley Moore Capito (incumbent)	173,331	83.34
Republican	Allen Whitt	19,972	9.60
Republican	Larry Butcher	14,673	7.06
Total votes		207,976	100.00
General election
Republican	Shelley Moore Capito (incumbent)	547,454	70.28
Democratic	Paula Jean Swearengin	210,309	27.00
Libertarian	David Moran	21,155	2.72
Total votes		778,918	100.00
Republican hold			

== Personal life ==
Capito is married to Charles L. Capito, and they have three children: Charles, Moore, and Shelley. Her father served over two years in prison on corruption charges. Her sister, Lucy Moore Durbin, was arrested in 1992 along with her husband for selling cocaine to an undercover officer. Capito and the Moore Capito family are members of First Presbyterian Church in Charleston, West Virginia, a congregation of the Presbyterian Church (USA).

In September 2015, Runner's World featured Capito in its "I'm a Runner" vlog, where she states she has been a distance runner for over 30 years.

== See also ==
- Women in the United States House of Representatives
- Women in the United States Senate

U.S. House of Representatives
Preceded by Bob Wise	Member of the U.S. House of Representatives from West Virginia's 2nd congressional district 2001–2015	Succeeded by Alex Mooney
Preceded by Judy Biggert	Chair of the Congressional Women's Caucus; 2003–2005	Succeeded by Ginny Brown-Waite
Party political offices
Preceded by Jay Wolfe	Republican nominee for U.S. Senator from West Virginia (Class 2); 2014, 2020, 2026	Most recent
Preceded by Joni Ernst	Vice Chair of the Senate Republican Conference; 2023–2025	Succeeded by James Lankford
Preceded by Joni Ernst	Chair of the Senate Republican Policy Committee; 2025–present	Incumbent
U.S. Senate
Preceded by Jay Rockefeller	U.S. Senator (Class 2) from West Virginia; 2015–present Served alongside: Joe Manchin, Jim Justice	Incumbent
Preceded by Tom Carper	Ranking Member of the Senate Environment Committee; 2021–2025	Succeeded by Sheldon Whitehouse
Preceded by Tom Carper	Chair of the Senate Environment Committee; 2025–present	Incumbent
U.S. order of precedence (ceremonial)
Preceded by Joni Ernst	Order of precedence of the United States as United States Senator	Succeeded by Mike Rounds
Preceded by Cory Booker	United States senators by seniority 46th	Succeeded by Gary Peters
