= Johnnie Turner (Kentucky politician) =

American attorney and politician (1947–2024)

Member of the Kentucky Senate from the 29th district
- In office January 1, 2021 – October 22, 2024
- Preceded by: Johnny Ray Turner
- Succeeded by: Scott Madon

Member of the Kentucky House of Representatives from the 88th district
- In office January 1, 1999 – January 1, 2003
- Preceded by: Thomas Pope
- Succeeded by: Bill Farmer (redistricting)

Personal details
- Born: December 24, 1947 Bledsoe, Kentucky, U.S.
- Died: October 22, 2024 (aged 76) Knoxville, Tennessee, U.S.
- Party: Republican
- Education: Union College (BS); University of Kentucky (JD)

Military service
- Branch/service: United States Army
- Years of service: 1967–1969

Johnnie Lloyd Turner (December 24, 1947 – October 22, 2024) was an American attorney and politician who served as a member of the Kentucky Senate from the 29th district. Elected in November 2020, he assumed office on January 1, 2021, and served until his death in October 2024.

== Early life and education ==
Turner was born in Bledsoe, Kentucky, on Christmas Eve 1947. He attended Pine Mountain Settlement School as well as the Red Bird Mission School. He earned a Bachelor of Science degree in accounting from Union College (now Union Commonwealth University) in 1974 and a Juris Doctor from the University of Kentucky College of Law in 1977.

== Career ==
From 1967 to 1969, Turner served as a medic in the United States Army and was at one time stationed in the Panama Canal Zone. He later worked as an attorney for Harlan County Public Schools. He also operated a private legal practice and was also an attorney for the city of Cumberland, Kentucky.

Turner was elected to the Kentucky House of Representatives in 1998, defeating Democratic incumbent Thomas Pope. In the 2002 redistricting cycle, his district was eliminated and redrawn in Lexington. He instead ran for the Kentucky Senate, losing to Daniel Mongiardo.

He was a candidate for the Kentucky House of Representatives in 2016 but withdrew before the election. Turner was elected to the Kentucky Senate in November 2020 and assumed office on January 1, 2021.

== Death ==
On September 15, 2024, Turner was critically injured after a lawn mower he was driving fell into an empty swimming pool at his home in Harlan. He was then taken to Harlan ARH Hospital before being transferred out-of-state to Knoxville, Tennessee's UT Medical Center. On October 22, Turner died from his injuries at 76 years of age.
