= Glenn Freeman =

American politician and businessman

Member of the Kentucky Senate from the 17th district
- In office January 1, 1997 – January 1, 2001
- Preceded by: Charles W. Berger
- Succeeded by: Daniel Mongiardo

Member of the Kentucky House of Representatives
- In office January 1, 1974 – January 1, 1978
- Preceded by: Bert Pollitte
- Succeeded by: Roger Noe
- Constituency: 88th district
- In office January 1, 1970 – January 1, 1972
- Preceded by: Needham Saylor
- Succeeded by: Jeff Howell (redistricting)
- Constituency: 89th district

Personal details
- Born: July 17, 1933
- Died: June 7, 2014 (aged 80)
- Party: Democratic

Glenn Richard Freeman (July 17, 1933 – June 7, 2014) was an American politician and businessman.

Born in Cumberland, Kentucky, Freeman served in the United States Army and received his bachelor's degree from University of Kentucky. Freeman also went to Cumberland University and Western Kentucky University. He worked in his family's businesses. He served in the Kentucky House of Representatives from 1970 to 1971 and from 1974 to 1977 and then in the Kentucky State Senate from 1996 to 2000 as a Democrat. He died in Corbin, Kentucky.
