= Roger Noe =

American politician (born 1950)

Member of the Kentucky House of Representatives from the 88th district
- In office January 1, 1978 – January 1, 1993
- Preceded by: Glenn Freeman
- Succeeded by: Rick Fox

Personal details
- Party: Democratic

Roger Noe (born 1950) is an American politician from Kentucky who was a member of the Kentucky House of Representatives from 1978 to 1993. Noe was first elected in 1977 after incumbent representative Glenn Freeman retired. He was defeated for renomination in 1992 by Rick Fox.
