= Kentucky's 30th Senate district =

American legislative district

Kentucky's 30th State Senate district
Senator
Brandon Smith; R–Hazard
since February 11, 2008
- Registration: 50.9% Democratic; 43.7% Republican; 5.1% No party preference
- Demographics: 94.8% White; 1.2% Black; 1.2% Hispanic; 0.5% Asian; 0.1% Native American; 0.1% Hawaiian/Pacific Islander; 0.1% Other; 2.1% Multiracial
- Population (2023): 117,974
- Registered voters (2025): 86,081

Kentucky's 30th Senatorial district is one of 38 districts in the Kentucky Senate. Located in the eastern part of the state, it comprises the counties of Breathitt, Estill, Lee, Leslie, Magoffin, Morgan, Perry, Powell, and Wolfe. It has been represented by Brandon Smith (R–Hazard) since 2008. As of 2023, the district had a population of 117,974.

== Voter registration ==
On January 1, 2025, the district had 86,081 registered voters, who were registered with the following parties.

Party	Registration	
Party	Voters	%
Democratic	43,815	50.90
Republican	37,599	43.68
Independent	2,277	2.65
Libertarian	203	0.24
Green	40	0.05
Constitution	23	0.03
Socialist Workers	7	0.01
Reform	3	0.00
"Other"	2,114	2.46
Total	86,081	100.00
Source: Kentucky State Board of Elections

== Election results from statewide races ==
=== 2014 – 2020 ===
Year	Office	Results (Note: Figures presented in this table are calculated by summing precinct election results published by the Kentucky State Board of Elections, using precinct data that list each precinct's senatorial district.)
2014	Senator	McConnell 65.8 - 30.9%
2015	Governor	Bevin 61.2 - 35.4%
2015	Secretary of State	Knipper 55.5 - 44.5%
2015	Attorney General	Westerfield 57.3 - 42.7%
2015	Auditor of Public Accounts	Harmon 57.9 - 42.1%
2015	State Treasurer	Ball 55.8 - 44.2%
2015	Commissioner of Agriculture	Quarles 65.5 - 34.5%
2016	President	Trump 79.2 - 18.2%
2016	Senator	Paul 65.4 - 34.6%
2019	Governor	Bevin 57.4 - 40.7%
2019	Secretary of State	Adams 64.8 - 35.2%
2019	Attorney General	Cameron 63.2 - 36.8%
2019	Auditor of Public Accounts	Harmon 66.8 - 30.9%
2019	State Treasurer	Ball 70.0 - 30.0%
2019	Commissioner of Agriculture	Quarles 66.8 - 31.1%
2020	President	Trump 80.1 - 18.6%
2020	Senator	McConnell 73.8 - 22.4%
2020	Amendment 1	Yes 57.1 - 42.9%
2020	Amendment 2	No 64.3 - 35.7%

=== 2022 – present ===
Year	Office	Results
2022	Senator	Paul 71.8 - 28.2%
2022	Amendment 1	Yes 53.3 - 46.7%
2022	Amendment 2	Yes 59.7 - 40.3%
2023	Governor	Cameron 50.3 - 49.7%
2023	Secretary of State	Adams 67.1 - 32.9%
2023	Attorney General	Coleman 65.5 - 34.5%
2023	Auditor of Public Accounts	Ball 68.2 - 31.8%
2023	State Treasurer	Metcalf 63.0 - 37.0%
2023	Commissioner of Agriculture	Shell 67.7 - 32.3%
2024	President	Trump 80.4 - 18.1%
2024	Amendment 1	Yes 65.0 - 35.0%
2024	Amendment 2	No 65.1 - 34.9%

== List of members representing the district ==
Member	Party	Years	Electoral history	District location
Wilson Palmer (Cynthiana)	Democratic	January 1, 1962 – January 1, 1974	Elected in 1961. Reelected in 1965. Reelected in 1969. Lost renomination.	1944–1964; Bracken, Grant, Harrison, Nicholas, Pendleton, and Robertson Counties.
Wilson Palmer (Cynthiana)	Democratic	January 1, 1962 – January 1, 1974	Elected in 1961. Reelected in 1965. Reelected in 1969. Lost renomination.	1964–1972
Wilson Palmer (Cynthiana)	Democratic	January 1, 1962 – January 1, 1974	Elected in 1961. Reelected in 1965. Reelected in 1969. Lost renomination.	1972–1974
Thomas Ward (Versailles)	Democratic	January 1, 1974 – January 31, 1977	Elected in 1973. Resigned to become executive director of the Governor's Task Force on Welfare.	1974–1984
Ed Ford (Cynthiana)	Democratic	January 1, 1978 – January 1, 1995	Elected in 1977. Reelected in 1981. Reelected in 1986. Reelected in 1990. Retired.	1974–1984
Ed Ford (Cynthiana)	Democratic	January 1, 1978 – January 1, 1995	Elected in 1977. Reelected in 1981. Reelected in 1986. Reelected in 1990. Retired.	1984–1993; Bourbon, Fayette (part), Harrison, Nicholas, Robertson, Scott, and Woodford Counties.
Ed Ford (Cynthiana)	Democratic	January 1, 1978 – January 1, 1995	Elected in 1977. Reelected in 1981. Reelected in 1986. Reelected in 1990. Retired.	1993–1997
Denny Nunnelley (Versailles)	Democratic	January 1, 1995 – January 1, 1999	Elected in 1994. Lost renomination.	1993–1997
Denny Nunnelley (Versailles)	Democratic	January 1, 1995 – January 1, 1999	Elected in 1994. Lost renomination.	1997–2003
Ed Miller (Cynthiana)	Democratic	January 1, 1999 – January 1, 2003	Elected in 1998. Redistricted to the 28th district and lost renomination.	1997–2003
Daniel Mongiardo (Hazard)	Democratic	January 1, 2003 – December 11, 2007	Redistricted from the 17th district and reelected in 2002. Reelected in 2006. Resigned after being elected Lieutenant Governor of Kentucky.	2003–2015
Brandon Smith (Hazard)	Republican	February 11, 2008 – present	Elected to finish Mongiardo's term. Reelected in 2010. Reelected in 2014. Reelected in 2018. Reelected in 2022. Reelected in 2026.	2003–2015
Brandon Smith (Hazard)	Republican	February 11, 2008 – present	Elected to finish Mongiardo's term. Reelected in 2010. Reelected in 2014. Reelected in 2018. Reelected in 2022. Reelected in 2026.	2015–2023
Brandon Smith (Hazard)	Republican	February 11, 2008 – present	Elected to finish Mongiardo's term. Reelected in 2010. Reelected in 2014. Reelected in 2018. Reelected in 2022. Reelected in 2026.	2023–present
