= Thomas Pope (Kentucky politician) =

American politician

Member of the Kentucky House of Representatives from the 88th district
- In office January 1, 1997 – January 1, 1999
- Preceded by: Rick Fox
- Succeeded by: Johnnie L. Turner

Personal details
- Party: Democratic

Thomas R. Pope (born 1947) is an American politician from Kentucky who was a member of the Kentucky House of Representatives from 1997 to 1999. Pope was elected in 1996, defeating incumbent representative Rick Fox for renomination. He was defeated for reelection in 1998 by Republican Johnnie L. Turner.
