= Kentucky's 17th Senate district =

American legislative district

Kentucky's 17th State Senate district
Senator
Matt Nunn; R–Sadieville
since January 1, 2025
- Registration: 52.3% Republican; 35.2% Democratic; 11.8% No party preference
- Demographics: 86.4% White; 4.5% Black; 4.6% Hispanic; 1.0% Asian; 0.1% Native American; 0.2% Other; 3.2% Multiracial
- Population (2023): 127,003
- Registered voters (2025): 101,425

Kentucky's 17th Senatorial district is one of 38 districts in the Kentucky Senate. Stretching from Lexington to the northern part of the state, it comprises the counties of Grant, Scott, and parts of Fayette and Kenton. It has been represented by Matt Nunn (R–Sadieville) since 2025. As of 2023, the district had a population of 127,003.

== Voter registration ==
On January 1, 2025, the district had 101,425 registered voters, who were registered with the following parties.

Party	Registration	
Party	Voters	%
Republican	53,003	52.26
Democratic	35,745	35.24
Independent	5,492	5.41
Libertarian	603	0.59
Green	69	0.07
Constitution	52	0.05
Socialist Workers	10	0.01
Reform	6	0.01
"Other"	6,445	6.35
Total	101,425	100.00
Source: Kentucky State Board of Elections

== Election results from statewide races ==
=== 2022 – present ===
Year	Office	Results (Note: Figures presented in this table are calculated by summing precinct election results published by the Kentucky State Board of Elections, using precinct data that list each precinct's senatorial district.)
2022	Senator	Paul 63.7 - 36.3%
2022	Amendment 1	No 52.0 - 48.0%
2022	Amendment 2	No 54.0 - 46.0%
2023	Governor	Beshear 50.6 - 49.4%
2023	Secretary of State	Adams 63.5 - 36.4%
2023	Attorney General	Coleman 59.9 - 40.1%
2023	Auditor of Public Accounts	Ball 63.9 - 36.1%
2023	State Treasurer	Metcalf 60.3 - 39.7%
2023	Commissioner of Agriculture	Shell 62.1 - 37.9%
2024	President	Trump 66.4 - 31.8%
2024	Amendment 1	Yes 66.2 - 33.8%
2024	Amendment 2	No 65.1 - 34.9%

== List of members representing the district ==
Member	Party	Years	Electoral history	District location
Durham W. Howard (Pineville)	Republican	January 1, 1960 – January 1, 1968	Elected in 1959. Reelected in 1963. Lost renomination.	1944–1964; Bell and Knox Counties.
Durham W. Howard (Pineville)	Republican	January 1, 1960 – January 1, 1968	Elected in 1959. Reelected in 1963. Lost renomination.	1964–1972
Charles B. Upton (Williamsburg)	Republican	January 1, 1968 – January 1, 1972	Elected in 1967. Lost renomination.	1964–1972
Denver C. Knuckles (Middlesboro)	Republican	January 1, 1972 – January 1, 1976	Elected in 1971. Lost reelection.	1972–1974
Denver C. Knuckles (Middlesboro)	Republican	January 1, 1972 – January 1, 1976	Elected in 1971. Lost reelection.	1974–1984
Bert Ed Pollitte (Harlan)	Democratic	January 1, 1976 – January 1, 1980	Elected in 1975. Retired.	1974–1984
Charles W. Berger (Harlan)	Democratic	January 1, 1980 – January 1, 1997	Elected in 1979. Reelected in 1983. Reelected in 1988. Reelected in 1992. Lost renomination.	1974–1984
Charles W. Berger (Harlan)	Democratic	January 1, 1980 – January 1, 1997	Elected in 1979. Reelected in 1983. Reelected in 1988. Reelected in 1992. Lost renomination.	1984–1993; Bell, Harlan, Letcher (part), and Perry (part) Counties.
Charles W. Berger (Harlan)	Democratic	January 1, 1980 – January 1, 1997	Elected in 1979. Reelected in 1983. Reelected in 1988. Reelected in 1992. Lost renomination.	1993–1997
Glenn Freeman (Cumberland)	Democratic	January 1, 1997 – January 1, 2001	Elected in 1996. Lost renomination.	1997–2003
Daniel Mongiardo (Hazard)	Democratic	January 1, 2001 – January 1, 2003	Elected in 2000. Resigned after being elected to the 30th senate district.	1997–2003
Damon Thayer (Georgetown)	Republican	February 4, 2003 – January 1, 2025	Elected to finish Mongiardo's term. Reelected in 2004. Reelected in 2008. Reelected in 2012. Reelected in 2016. Reelected in 2020. Retired.	2003–2015
Damon Thayer (Georgetown)	Republican	February 4, 2003 – January 1, 2025	Elected to finish Mongiardo's term. Reelected in 2004. Reelected in 2008. Reelected in 2012. Reelected in 2016. Reelected in 2020. Retired.	2015–2023
Damon Thayer (Georgetown)	Republican	February 4, 2003 – January 1, 2025	Elected to finish Mongiardo's term. Reelected in 2004. Reelected in 2008. Reelected in 2012. Reelected in 2016. Reelected in 2020. Retired.	2023–present
Matt Nunn (Sadieville)	Republican	January 1, 2025 – present	Elected in 2024.	2023–present
