= Denny Nunnelley =

American politician

Member of the Kentucky Senate from the 30th district
- In office January 1, 1995 – January 1, 1999
- Preceded by: Ed Ford
- Succeeded by: Ed Miller

Personal details
- Born: 1951 (age 74–75)
- Party: Democratic

Earl Dennis Nunnelley (born 1951) is an American politician from Kentucky who was a member of the Kentucky Senate from 1995 to 1999. Nunnelley was elected in 1994 after incumbent senator Ed Ford retired. He was defeated for renomination in 1998 by Ed Miller.
