= Bill Farmer (politician) =

American politician

Member of the Kentucky House of Representatives from the 88th district
- In office January 1, 2003 – January 1, 2013
- Preceded by: Johnnie Turner (redistricting)
- Succeeded by: Robert Benvenuti

Personal details
- Party: Republican

William Farmer Jr. (born March 18, 1962) is an American politician from Kentucky who was a member of the Kentucky House of Representatives from 2003 to 2013. Farmer was first elected in 2002 when the 88th district in Harlan County was eliminated and redrawn in Lexington. He did not seek reelection in 2012 and was succeeded by Robert Benvenuti. When Benvenuti retired in 2018, Farmer ran for the seat again, losing to Democrat Cherlynn Stevenson.
