= Ed Miller (Kentucky politician) =

American politician

Member of the Kentucky Senate from the 30th district
- In office January 1, 1999 – January 1, 2003
- Preceded by: Denny Nunnelley
- Succeeded by: Daniel Mongiardo (redistricting)

Personal details
- Born: August 22, 1931
- Died: May 2, 2005 (aged 73)
- Party: Democratic

Edwin Earl “Ed” Miller (August 22, 1931 – May 2, 2005) was an American politician from Kentucky who was a member of the Kentucky Senate from 1999 to 2003. Miller was elected in 1998, defeating incumbent senator Denny Nunnelley for renomination. In 2002, redistricting moved the 30th district to southeastern Kentucky. Miller instead ran in the 28th district, losing the Democratic nomination to incumbent senator R. J. Palmer.

He died in May 2005 at age 73.
