= Robert Benvenuti =

American politician

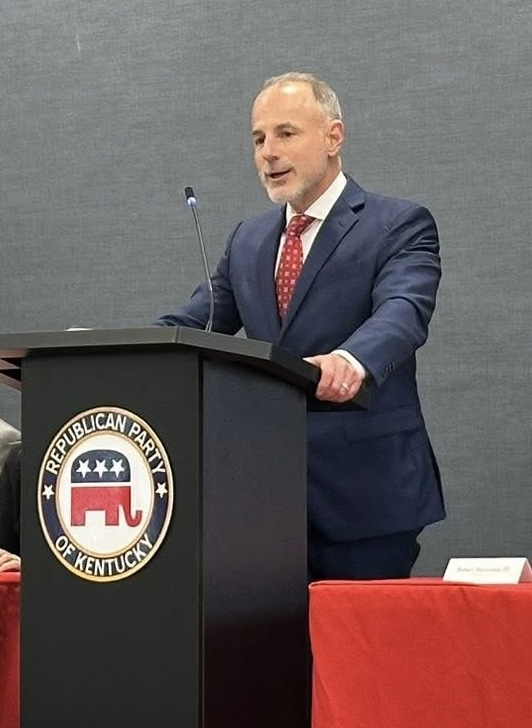
- Benvenutti in 2025

Chair of the Kentucky Republican Party
- Incumbent
- Assumed office December 11, 2023
- Preceded by: Mac Brown

Member of the Kentucky House of Representatives from the 88th district
- In office January 1, 2013 – January 1, 2019
- Preceded by: Bill Farmer
- Succeeded by: Cherlynn Stevenson

Personal details
- Born: August 31, 1966 (age 59)
- Party: Republican
- Education: University of Kentucky (BS, MPA, JD)
- Website: Campaign website

Robert James Benvenuti III (born August 31, 1966) is an American politician and current chair of the Kentucky Republican Party.

Previously, he was a member of the Kentucky House of Representatives representing Kentucky's 88th House district from 2013 to 2019.

== Education and early career ==
Benvenuti is a native of Sparta, New Jersey. He earned a Bachelor of Science degree in communications in 1988 and a Master of Public Administration degree in 1991, both from the University of Kentucky. He also earned a Juris Doctor from the University of Kentucky College of Law in 1998.

Following graduation, Benvenuti was employed as the corporate compliance officer for UK's Chandler Medical Center, and was an attorney for the firm Stites & Harbison. In 2004, he was appointed inspector general of the Kentucky Cabinet for Health and Family Services.

== Political career ==
=== Elections ===
In 2012, Kentucky's 88th House district incumbent, Bill Farmer, chose not to seek reelection. Benvenuti was unopposed for the May 22, 2012 Republican primary and won the 2012 Kentucky House of Representatives election with 12,959 votes (54.0%) against Democratic nominee and future state senator Reggie Thomas. He was unopposed in both the 2014 and 2016 Republican primary, and was also unopposed in the 2016 Kentucky House of Representative election.

In 2018, Bevenvunti did not seek reelection.

2016 Election Results
Party	Candidate	Votes	%
Republican	Robert Benvenuti	20,242	100.0%

2014 Election Results
Party	Candidate	Votes	%
Republican	Robert Benvenuti	11,592	64.2%
Democratic	Creasa Reed	6,473	35.8%

2012 Election Results
Party	Candidate	Votes	%
Republican	Robert Benvenuti	12,959	54.0%
Democratic	Reggie Thomas	11,054	46.0%

Party political offices
Preceded by Mac Brown	Chair of the Kentucky Republican Party; 2023–present	Incumbent
