= Kansas Traditional Republican Majority =

Political action committee

The Kansas Traditional Republican Majority (KTRM) is a political action committee founded in 2005 that supports more state government programs (especially education) and moderate social policies. It is connected to the Republican Main Street Partnership. Becky Johnson chairs the group.

KTRM's website states, "Our Republican Party must be a model that not only claims the mantle of Abraham Lincoln, Ronald Reagan, Dwight D. Eisenhower, and Nancy Kassebaum, but that is also willing to embody their values."

KTRM is notable for opposing the conservative Republican members of the state school board who wanted to introduce the teaching of Creationism or Intelligent Design at various times in 2005 and 2006.

One of the first newspapers articles about KTRM said their purpose was to disempower the far right. Charlotte Esau, a leading conservative from Kansas Republican Assembly, said, "Based on what I've seen so far, this is not a Republican group. It's a liberal front group for Democrats who want to pretend they are Republicans so they can hoodwink the voters into electing candidates who will talk Republican before the election and vote Democrat once in office."

KTRM representing Kansas moderates says they attempt to move the Kansas Republican Party to the political center. Moderates object to being labeled as RINOs.

Conservatives say KTRM is attempting to move the Kansas Republican Party to the left and is a liberal group since KTRM has shared major donors with the Kansas Democratic Party. A political profile of KTRM members shows their help to Kansas Democrats, including Governor Kathleen Sebelius.

KTRM has received much support from former Kansas Senator and 1996 Presidential Candidate Bob Dole.

KTRM has joined with moderate GOP groups such as the Republican Main Street Partnership and Republicans for Environmental Protection.

In the August 2012 Republican primary KTRM was a major recipient of funds from the leadership PAC, Senate Republican Leadership Committee PAC, controlled by moderate Kansas Senate President Stephen Morris. A former KTRM treasurer and executive director was a key player in other PACs receiving funds directly or indirectly from the Senate Republican Leadership PAC.
