= Idaho Federation of Reagan Republicans =

The Idaho Federation of Reagan Republicans was an independent Republican Party activist group in the United States that seeks to build on the legacy of Ronald Reagan by "Actively Building the New Conservative Majority"; its precursor organization was the Kootenai County Reagan Republicans, and its president is Jeff Ward.

Founded in January 2012, its first and to date only statewide action was proposing a citizen's initiative to privatize liquor sales and disband the Idaho State Liquor Division (thus removing Idaho from the control state system). Having been initially reviewed by the Attorney General of Idaho as presenting a constitutional conflict between the legislature's vested authority and the people's initiative power (a conflict which presents an avenue for a court challenge should the initiative pass), if eventually vetted the initiative must then gather 47,432 petition signatures (6% of registered Idaho voters as of the last general election) by April 30, 2012, in order to be placed on the ballot for the general election of November 2012. Its own initiative is currently under review by the Idaho Federation of Reagan Republicans.

Jeff Ward had previously stated that "It was important to us that this initiative is written in regards to the proper role of government, not who would benefit by the privatization of liquor sales." (A similar ballot measure had been considered by the Northwest Grocery Association, which decided to hold off until the 2013 legislative session).

Gov. Butch Otter had previously stated just two weeks before, however, that he didn't think Idaho was an environment where privatization would "find a soft landing," given that Idaho's 1890 Constitution mandates that "The first concern of all good government is the virtue and sobriety of the people, and the purity of the home. The legislature should further all wise and well directed efforts for the promotion of temperance and morality." The proposed initiative has been furthermore been regarded by the Washington Spokesman-Review both as being problematic for Idaho (due to the minarchist/temperance conflict being in effect a conservative wedge issue), and as a scaled-down version of Washington's Initiative 1183 battle, which dismantled that state's three-tier system of alcohol distribution.
