= Ed Ford (politician) =

American politician

Member of the Kentucky Senate from the 30th district
- In office January 1, 1978 – January 1, 1995
- Preceded by: Thomas Ward
- Succeeded by: Denny Nunnelley

Personal details
- Born: January 1, 1930
- Died: July 2, 2010 (aged 80)
- Party: Democratic

Edward Sinclair Ford Jr. (January 1, 1930 – July 2, 2010) was an American politician from Kentucky who was a member of the Kentucky Senate from 1978 to 1995. Ford was first elected in 1977 after incumbent senator Thomas Ward resigned to join the administration of governor Julian Carroll. He did not seek reelection in 1994.

He died in July 2010 at age 80.
