= Republicans for Choice =

American political action committee

Republicans for Choice is an American political action committee (PAC) composed of members of the United States Republican Party who support abortion rights.

== History ==
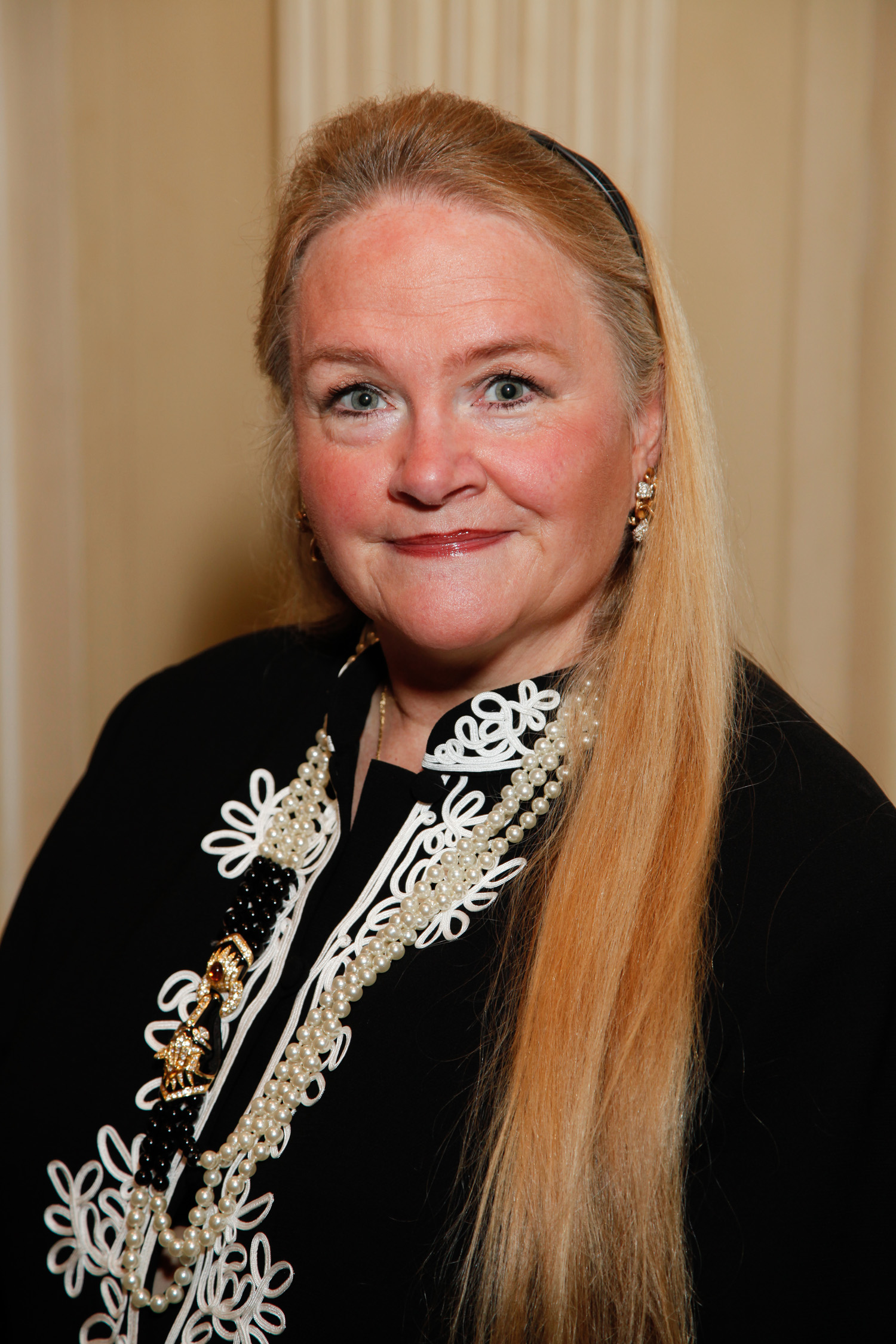
Ann Stone, as honoree at Women's eNews 21 Leaders 2012

Republicans for Choice was founded in 1989 by conservative fundraiser and activist Ann Stone, the first wife of Roger Stone, at the suggestion of Lee Atwater, a former chairman of the RNC, to counter the Republican Party's perceived increasing focus on anti-abortion candidates and political platform, and Stone brought this agenda to the 1992 Republican National Convention.

As of 2020, three Republicans serving in Congress had been supported by Republicans for Choice, Senators Shelley Moore Capito of West Virginia, Susan Collins of Maine, and Lisa Murkowski of Alaska. However, the committee spends very little on campaigns, relative to other PACs, spending 10.6% of total spending on "direct assistance to candidates", while the similar Republican Majority for Choice PAC has spent more than 87% on campaigns.

== Supported Members of Congress ==
=== Senate ===
Serving as of 2020:

- Susan Collins, Maine
- Shelley Moore Capito, West Virginia
- Lisa Murkowski, Alaska

=== House ===
Serving as of 2020:

- None

== Mission ==
The organization has quoted the Republican Party's Statement of Principles, suggesting that this encompasses the option to choose abortion: the Party wants "[a]n America with a smaller less burdensome government that trusts its people to decide what is best for them ... [a]n America where freedom of expression, individual conscience, and personal privacy are cherished and respected."

It has called for the Human Life Amendment to be removed from the abortion plank and that the platform reflect real policy that represents a common ground approach where both sides of the GOP can work together to make abortion unnecessary without taking away women's rights.

The RFC endorses republicans with conservative values who support allowing women to choose if they would like an abortion.

In that light, Republicans for Choice has suggested changes to the Republican National Platform with regard to societal attitudes towards gay and lesbian issues.

Republicans for Choice is partners with other Republican groups such as The Wish List, The Republican Majority For Choice, IMP-PAC (It's My Party Too), and the Republican Main Street Partnership.

== See also ==
- Democrats for Life of America
- Libertarians for Life
- Republican Majority for Choice
