= Rick Fox (politician) =

American politician (born 1952)

Member of the Kentucky House of Representatives from the 88th district
- In office January 1, 1993 – January 1, 1997
- Preceded by: Roger Noe
- Succeeded by: Thomas Pope

Personal details
- Born: 1952 (age 73–74)
- Party: Democratic

Rick Fox (born 1952) is an American politician from Kentucky who was a member of the Kentucky House of Representatives from 1993 to 1997. Fox was first elected in 1992 after defeating incumbent representative Roger Noe in the May primary election. He was defeated for renomination in 1996 by Thomas Pope.
