= National Council for a New America =

Republican Party group

The National Council for a New America is a group of Republican Party members that is aimed at rebranding the party. The group was formed as a way to both rebound from recent setbacks, and to cast off the "party of no" labeling that the Republicans have been given by the Democrats.

The first meeting was conducted on May 2, 2009, in Arlington, Virginia.

== History ==
News reports cite sources that say the panel was born of conversations between Cantor and the members of the experts panel.

== Members ==
The council consists of a "National Panel of Experts". Members of the panel are:

- Haley Barbour
- Bobby Jindal
- Mitt Romney
- Jeb Bush
- John McCain
- Sarah Palin
- Newt Gingrich

The panel will report to Republican congressional leaders, including:

- John Boehner
- Eric Cantor
- Mike Pence
- Mitch McConnell
- Jon Kyl
- Lamar Alexander
