= Matt Nunn (politician) =

Kentucky politician

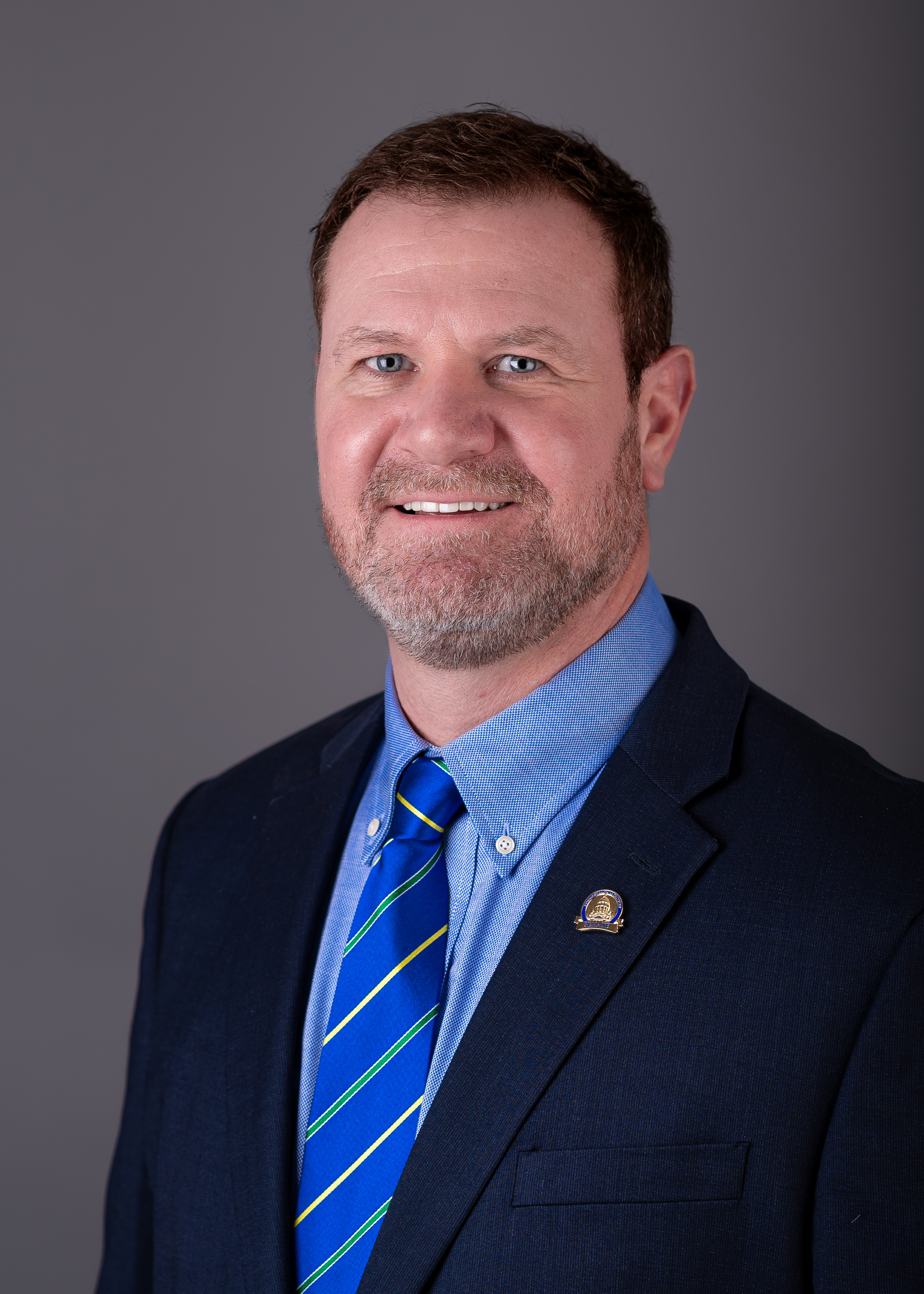
- Official portrait, 2025

Member of the Kentucky Senate from the 17th district
- Incumbent
- Assumed office January 1, 2025
- Preceded by: Damon Thayer

Personal details
- Born: January 6, 1978 (age 48)
- Party: Republican

Matt Nunn (born January 6, 1978) is an American politician who is a member of the Kentucky Senate. His term began in January 2025. He represents the 17th district, which includes Grant and Scott Counties, and parts of Fayette and Kenton.

== Political career ==
Nunn was elected in the 2024 Kentucky Senate election following the retirement of incumbent senator Damon Thayer. He received 69.1 percent of the vote, defeating Democratic candidate Kiana Fields.

== Electoral history ==
=== 2024 ===
Republican primary results
Party	Candidate	Votes	%
Republican	Matt Nunn	6,291	67.0
Republican	Julia Jaddock	3,099	33.0
Total votes		9,390	100.0

2024 Kentucky Senate 17th district election
Party	Candidate	Votes	%
Republican	Matt Nunn	42,430	69.1
Democratic	Kiana Fields	19,015	30.9
Total votes		61,445	100.0
Republican hold			

Kentucky Senate
Preceded by Damon Thayer	Member of the Kentucky Senate from the 17th district 2025–present	Succeeded by incumbent
