= The Wish List (political organization) =

Political action committee in the U.S

The Wish List is a political action committee devoted to electing pro-abortion rights, also called pro-choice, Republican women to the House of Representatives and Senate. The Wish List was founded in 1992. The acronym "WISH" stands for Women In the Senate and House. The Wish List recruits candidates to run for federal office and state legislative offices.

== History ==
The Wish List was established in 1992 following an organizing effort in December, 1991, led by Lynn Shapiro who became the Executive Director. Glenda Greenwald, who was president of the PAC, was among the women activists predicting that 1992 would be the Year of the Woman, and she argued that the GOP was not sufficiently funding women candidates. The primary purpose was to specifically fund women Republican candidates. Inspired by EMILY's List, a PAC supporting pro-abortion rights Democratic women, Wish claimed 1,600 members after its founding in 1992. In 1994, Victoria Toensing, also a founder of the Wish List, claimed the group had grown to 2,000 members and stated that the PAC would only fund pro-abortion rights Republican women, and would not support anti-abortion Republican women.

The PAC was present at the 1992 Republican National Convention, together with Republicans for Choice and the National Republican Coalition for Choice, and was addressed by then-Representative Olympia Snowe of Maine. In the 1994 election cycle, The Wish List endorsed Kay Bailey Hutchison and Olympia Snowe for the Senate, and Susan Collins in her unsuccessful gubernatorial campaign in Maine. Senator Kay Bailey Hutchison also served as an honorary board member of the organization. The PAC was present at the 1996 Convention, again with Republicans for Choice, and a survey of Republican delegates at the 1996 Convention found that legal abortion was supported by 24% of the delegates. In 2006, the Wish List supported three Republican women for US Senate, Jeanine Pirro in New York, Olympia Snowe in Maine, and Cynthia Thielen in Hawaii. Although originally supporting exclusively women Republican candidates, the PAC supported Rudy Giuliani's presidential campaign in 2008.

The Wish List offers support for candidates by bundling contributions from their members. They have hosted events in DC, being featured on C-SPAN, to promote their candidates. The organization encourages members to donate to two of the eligible candidates during an election cycle. The organization claims to raise over $1 million per year from their supporters. The PAC was among the largest in the US between 1995 and 1996, raising more than $1million for its endorsed candidates. In 2004, the Wish List supported 11 Republican candidates for federal office. However, by 2010, the PAC reported giving only $1,579 to federal candidates, and has reported no contributions to federal candidates since 2012.

== Views and relationships ==
This committee is the Republican equivalent to EMILY's List, whose goal is to elect pro-abortion rights Democratic women. Susan B. Anthony List is the anti-abortion counterpart to this organization, whose goal is to assist anti-abortion, or what they describe as "pro-life," women candidates. Research published by Political Research Quarterly found that contributors to EMILY's List typically espoused politically liberal and feminist views while contributors to the Wish List tended to express a libertarian rationale for supporting pro-abortion rights and women's rights movements. The same study also explored political ideology among contributors of the Wish List and found that more than half self-identified as moderate, approximately a third as "somewhat conservative," and 1% as "very conservative."

The Wish List maintained strong alliances with other moderate Republican groups, such as the Republican Majority for Choice, It's My Party Too, and Republicans For Choice. In 2010, the Wish List had officially joined with the Republican Majority for Choice. In 2018, the Republican Majority for Choice ceased to be an active PAC. The Wish List continues to be an active PAC.

== Members ==
- Wish List Chairwoman, Glenda L. Greenwald
- President, Pat Giardina Carpenter
- Secretary, Victoria Toensing
- Treasurer, Maureen H. Lydon

== Senate ==
- Lisa Murkowski, Alaska
- Susan Collins, Maine
- Shelley Moore Capito, West Virginia (currently considered "pro-life"; no longer considered as "pro-choice")
- Kay Bailey Hutchison, Texas (former Senator)
- Olympia Snowe, Maine (former Senator)

== House ==
- Mary Bono Mack of California (former U.S. Representative)
- Lynn Jenkins of Kansas (former U.S. Representative)
- Kay Granger of Texas (former U.S. Representative; currently identifies as "pro-life"; no longer as "pro-choice")
- Nancy Johnson, Connecticut (former U.S. Representative)
- Heather Wilson of New Mexico (former U.S. Representative)
- Ginny Brown-Waite, Florida (former U.S. Representative)
- Sue Kelly, New York (former U.S. Representative)
- Judy Biggert of Illinois (former U.S. Representative)
- Deborah Pryce of Ohio (former U.S. Representative)

== Governors ==
- Jodi Rell, Connecticut (No longer a governor)
- Linda Lingle, Hawaii (No longer a governor)

== Other statewide offices ==
- Arizona Corporation Commissioner Kristin Mayes (No longer in office; now a Democrat)
- Kansas Insurance Commissioner Sandy Praeger (No longer Insurance Commissioner; now a Democrat)
- North Carolina Labor Commissioner Cherie Killian Berry (No longer in office)
- Arizona Secretary of State Michele Reagan (No longer Secretary of State)
- Illinois State Comptroller Judy Baar Topinka (died in office)
- Massachusetts Lieutenant Governor Kerry Healey (No longer Lt. Governor)
- Delaware State Treasurer Janet Rzewnicki (No longer in office)
- Massachusetts Acting Governor Jane Swift (No longer in office)

== State Senate ==
Carolyn Allen, Arizona (deceased)	Barbara Allen, Kansas (No longer a Senator)	Pat Vance, Pennsylvania
Toni Hellon, Arizona (No longer listed)	Jean Kurtis Schodorf, Kansas (No longer a Senator; now a Democrat)	Mary Jo White, Pennsylvania
Nancy Spence, Colorado	Vicki Schmidt, Kansas (No Longer a Senator, elected to be insurance commissioner)	June Gibbs, Rhode Island
Cathy Cook, Connecticut (No longer listed)	Diane Allen, New Jersey	Diane Snelling, Vermont
Judith Freedman, Connecticut	Martha Bark, New Jersey (No longer a Senator)	Wendy Wilton, Vermont (No longer listed)
Liane Sorenson, Delaware	Sue Wilson Beffort, New Mexico	Cheryl Pflug, Washington
Pamela Althoff, Illinois (out of office)	Patricia McGee, New York (No longer a Senator)	
Christine Radogno, Illinois (out of office)	Jane Earll, Pennsylvania	

== State House ==
Gabrielle LeDoux, Alaska (No longer listed)	Nancy Detert, Florida (deceased)	Julie Brown, New Hampshire
Michele Reagan, Arizona	Barbara Marumoto, Hawaii (no longer in office)	Patricia Dunlap, New Hampshire (No longer listed)
Lynn Daucher, California (No longer a Representative)	Cynthia Thielen, Hawaii (no longer in office)	Stephanie Eaton, New Hampshire
Shirley Horton, California	Jana Kemp, Idaho (No longer listed)	Sheila Francoeur, New Hampshire
Penny Bacchiochi, Connecticut	Suzanne Bassi, Illinois (no longer in office)	Elizabeth Hager, New Hampshire
Toni Boucher, Connecticut	Elizabeth Coulson, Illinois (no longer in office)	Sandra Balomenos Keans, New Hampshire (No longer listed)
Ruth Fahrbach, Connecticut	Carolyn Krause, Illinois (no longer in office)	Charlotte Vandervalk, New Jersey
Livvy Floren, Connecticut	Patricia Reid Lindner, Illinois (no longer in office)	Nancy Calhoun, New York
Lile Gibbons, Connecticut	Rosemary Mulligan, Illinois (no longer in office)	Donna Ferrara, New York (No longer listed)
Sonya Googins, Connecticut	Sandra Pihos, Illinois (no longer in office)	Teresa Sayward, New York
DebraLee Hovey, Connecticut	Vaneta Becker, Indiana (No longer listed)	Dierdre Scozzafava, New York (no longer in office, now a Democrat)
Themis Klarides, Connecticut	Phyllis Pond, Indiana (deceased)	Vicki Berger, Oregon
Claudia Powers, Connecticut	Libby Swanson Jacobs, Iowa (No longer listed)	Sue Cornell, Pennsylvania (No longer listed)
Pamela Ziegler Sawyer, Connecticut	Susan Williams Gifford, Massachusetts (deceased)	Carole Rubley, Pennsylvania (No longer a Representative)
Lenny Winkler, Connecticut	Shirley Gomes, Massachusetts (No longer a Representative)	Carol Mumford, Rhode Island
Donna Stone, Delaware	Karyn Polito, Massachusetts (currently Lieutenant Governor of Massachusetts)	Jodi Cutler, South Dakota
Nancy Wagner, Delaware	Susan W. Pope, Massachusetts	Joyce Errecart, Vermont
Donna Clark, Florida (No longer listed)	Mary Rogeness, Massachusetts	
Faye Culp, Florida	Kathlyn Fares, Missouri	
