= ConservAmerica =

National nonprofit organization

- Logo
- Formation: 1995; 31 years ago
- Type: 501(c)(3)
- Purpose: Conservative environmental advocacy
- Headquarters: Washington, D.C.
- Region served: United States
- President: Jeff Kupfer
- Vice President: Todd Johnston
- Website: conservamerica.org
- Formerly called: Republicans for Environmental Protection

ConservAmerica, formerly known as Republicans for Environmental Protection (REP), is a national nonprofit organization formed in 1995. REP's stated purpose is to strengthen the Republican Party's stance on environmental issues and support efforts to conserve natural resources and protect human and environmental health. Incorporated in Illinois, its headquarters are in Sturgis, Michigan.

On March 30, 2012, REP President Rob Sisson and Chairwoman Tina Beattie announced that the organization would be changing its name to ConservAmerica. ConservAmerica had been the name of REP's sister 501(c)(3) organization; that nonprofit is now called the Conservatives for Responsible Stewardship.

== History ==
REP was founded in 1995 by three women, Martha Marks, who at the time was a member of the Lake County, Illinois, Board of County Commissioners; Kim O'Keefe-Wilkins; and Aurie Kryzuda. They met at an endangered species conference in Chevy Chase, Maryland. As lifelong Republicans, they were concerned that the new Republican majority in the 104th Congress was seeking to weaken the Clean Water Act and other environmental laws.

In April 2012, ConservAmerica became a separate organization from REP led by Rob Sisson. The new group named itself "ConservAmerica", a name that it said represented "the inherent connection between conservation and conservatism".

== Mission ==
"ConservAmerica's mission is to educate the public and elected officials on conservative approaches to today's environmental, energy, and conservation challenges."

ConservAmerica's slogan, "Conservation is Conservative," is based on the traditional conservative philosophy of writers and thinkers such as British statesman Edmund Burke, President Theodore Roosevelt, and authors Russell Kirk, author of The Conservative Mind, and Richard Weaver, author of Ideas Have Consequences. ConservAmerica argues in its literature that conservation and responsible environmental stewardship are core conservative values that necessarily extend from concepts such as prudence, personal responsibility, thrift and Burke's view that society is a partnership among past, present and future generations.

ConservAmerica cites the conservation achievements of Republican leaders, including Abraham Lincoln's initial protection of Yosemite Valley and pioneering conservationist president, Theodore Roosevelt's establishment of national forests, monuments, parks, and wildlife refuges. Other Republican leaders often cited by REP for their conservation records include Presidents Herbert Hoover, Dwight Eisenhower, Richard Nixon, Gerald Ford, and Ronald Reagan, Senators Barry Goldwater, John Chafee, William Roth and John McCain, Congressman John Saylor, and California Governor Arnold Schwarzenegger.

== Issue advocacy ==
ConservAmerica advocates for conservation and environmental protection on a wide variety of environment and energy-related issues. The organization favors retention of environmental laws that were adopted with bipartisan support, such as the Wilderness Act, Clean Air Act, Clean Water Act, Endangered Species Act, the National Environmental Policy Act (NEPA) and the Wild & Scenic Rivers Act.

Since 2018, ConservAmerica has focused on advocating for market-oriented approaches to addressing energy and climate issues. ConservAmerica advocates for reduced U.S. dependence on oil and other fossil fuels through more energy efficiency, and more use of renewable and nuclear energy. ConservAmerica's environmental policy positions are covered in the organization's website under the Issues tab and detailed in a variety of ConservAmerica policy papers.
