= 2026 United States House of Representatives elections in Kentucky =

- November 3, 2026

All 6 Kentucky seats to the United States House of Representatives
	Majority party	Minority party
Party	Republican	Democratic
Seats before	5	1
Seats won	4	2
Seat change	▼1	▲1
Popular vote	765,229	622,448
Percentage	53.80%	43.76%
Swing	▼19.27%	▲16.89%

Republican hold
Democratic hold Democratic gain
Republican
40–50%
50–60%
60–70%
70–80%
80–90%
Democratic
40–50%
50–60%
60–70%
70–80%

The 2026 United States House of Representatives elections in Kentucky were held on November 3, 2026, to elect the six U.S. representatives from the state of Kentucky, one from each of the state's congressional districts. The elections coincided with other elections to the House of Representatives, elections to the United States Senate, and various state and local elections. The primary elections took place on May 19, 2026. Democrats gained one seat, winning the sixth district for the first time since 2010.

== District 1 ==
2026 Kentucky's 1st congressional district election
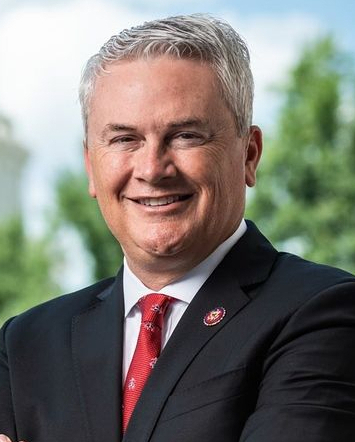

Nominee	James Comer	Drew Williams
Party	Republican	Democratic
Popular vote	154,910	74,260
Percentage	67.60%	32.40%
- Comer: 50–60% 60–70% 70–80% 80–90% Williams: 50–60%
U.S. representative before election
James Comer
Republican
Elected U.S. representative
James Comer
Republican

The 1st district is based in Western Kentucky, and stretches into Central Kentucky, taking in Henderson, Hopkinsville, Madisonville, Paducah, Murray, and Frankfort. The incumbent is Republican James Comer, who was re-elected with 74.7% of the vote in 2024.

=== Republican primary ===
==== Nominee ====
- James Comer, incumbent U.S. representative

==== Eliminated in primary ====
- Penny Arcos
- David Sims, truck driver
- Bob Sutherby, pastor and independent candidate for Tennessee's 7th congressional district in 2025

==== Endorsements ====
James Comer

Executive branch officials

- Donald Trump, 45th and 47th president of the United States (2017–2021, 2025–present)

Organizations

- AIPAC

==== Fundraising ====
Campaign finance reports as of April 29, 2026
Candidate	Raised	Spent	Cash on hand
James Comer (R)	$1,478,703	$1,588,676	$3,099,249
David Sims (R)	$1,800	$1501	$298
Source: Federal Election Commission

==== Results ====
Republican primary results
Party	Candidate	Votes	%
Republican	James R. Comer (incumbent)	77,678	88.1
Republican	David Sims	5,068	5.7
Republican	Robert James Sutherby	2,774	3.1
Republican	Penny Arcos	2,645	3.0
Total votes		88,165	100.0

=== Democratic primary ===
==== Nominee ====
- John "Drew" Williams, event organizer

==== Fundraising ====
Campaign finance reports as of April 29, 2026
Candidate	Raised	Spent	Cash on hand
Drew Williams (D)	$79,747	$68,318	$11,387
Source: Federal Election Commission

=== General election ===
==== Predictions ====
Source	Ranking	As of
Decision Desk HQ	Safe R	July 14, 2026
The Cook Political Report	Solid R	February 6, 2025
Inside Elections	Solid R	March 7, 2025
Sabato's Crystal Ball	Safe R	June 3, 2025

==== Post-primary endorsements ====
James Comer (R)

Labor unions

- United Mine Workers of America COMPAC

==== Fundraising ====
Campaign finance reports as of October 14, 2026
Candidate	Raised	Spent	Cash on hand
James Comer (R)	$2,318,361	$3,904,151	$1,623,432
Drew Williams (D)	$223,180	$213,881	$7,977
Source: Federal Election Commission

==== Results ====
2026 Kentucky's 1st congressional district election
Party	Candidate	Votes	%	±%
Republican	James R. Comer (incumbent)	154,910	67.60	−7.12
Democratic	John "Drew" Williams	74,260	32.40	+7.12
Total votes		229,170	100.0	N/A
Republican hold				

== District 2 ==
2026 Kentucky's 2nd congressional district election
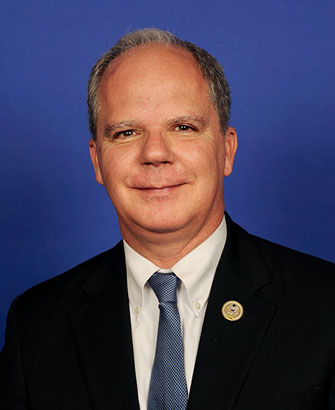

Nominee	Brett Guthrie	Megan Wingfield
Party	Republican	Democratic
Popular vote	145,139	81,112
Percentage	62.82%	35.10%
- Guthrie: 50–60% 60–70% 70–80% 80–90%
U.S. representative before election
Brett Guthrie
Republican
Elected U.S. representative
Brett Guthrie
Republican

The 2nd district is located in west central Kentucky, and includes Bowling Green, Owensboro, Elizabethtown, and a portion of eastern Louisville. The incumbent is Republican Brett Guthrie, who was re-elected with 73.1% of the vote in 2024.

=== Republican primary ===
==== Nominee ====
- Brett Guthrie, incumbent U.S. representative

==== Eliminated in primary ====
- Joshua Ferguson, former constable
- G. "Shay" Perry-Adelmann, former teacher, community activist and candidate for Jefferson County school board district three in 2022

==== Endorsements ====
Brett Guthrie

Executive branch officials

- Donald Trump, 45th and 47th president of the United States (2017–2021, 2025–present)

Organizations

- AIPAC

==== Fundraising ====
Campaign finance reports as of April 29, 2026
Candidate	Raised	Spent	Cash on hand
Joshua Ferguson (R)	$7,078	$7,013	$65
Brett Guthrie (R)	$4,193,324	$2,898,393	$1,661,176
Shay Perry-Adelmann (R)	$100,500	$1,483	$99,117
Source: Federal Election Commission

==== Results ====
Republican primary results
Party	Candidate	Votes	%
Republican	S. Brett Guthrie (incumbent)	65,176	85.4
Republican	Joshua M. Ferguson	7,187	9.4
Republican	G. "Shay" Perry-Adelmann	3,963	5.2
Total votes		76,326	100.0

=== Democratic primary ===
==== Nominee ====
- Megan Wingfield, mechanic

==== Eliminated in primary ====
- William Compton, Plum Springs city commissioner and candidate for this district in 2022 and 2024
- David Hatfield
- Hank Linderman, recording engineer and nominee for this district in 2018, 2020, 2022, and 2024

==== Endorsements ====
William Compton

Organizations

- Progressive Victory
- Track AIPAC

==== Fundraising ====
Campaign finance reports as of April 29, 2026
Candidate	Raised	Spent	Cash on hand
William Compton (D)	$62,061	$58,437	$271
Hank Linderman (D)	$3,800	$23,339	$2,023
Source: Federal Election Commission

==== Results ====
Democratic primary results
Party	Candidate	Votes	%
Democratic	Megan Wingfield	16,330	40.7
Democratic	Hank Linderman	8,401	20.9
Democratic	David S. Hatfield	8,254	20.6
Democratic	William Dakota Compton	7,126	17.8
Total votes		40,111	100.0

=== Independent candidates ===
- Thomas A. Loecken

=== General election ===
==== Predictions ====
Source	Ranking	As of
Decision Desk HQ	Safe R	July 14, 2026
The Cook Political Report	Solid R	February 6, 2025
Inside Elections	Solid R	March 7, 2025
Sabato's Crystal Ball	Safe R	June 3, 2025

==== Post-primary endorsements ====
Megan Wingfield (D)

Organizations

- National Women's Political Caucus

==== Fundraising ====
Campaign finance reports as of October 14, 2026
Candidate	Raised	Spent	Cash on hand
Brett Guthrie (R)	$5,986,647	$4,905,596	$1,447,296
Megan Wingfield (D)	$9,584	$7,832	$1,271
Source: Federal Election Commission

==== Results ====
2026 Kentucky's 2nd congressional district election
Party	Candidate	Votes	%	±%
Republican	S. Brett Guthrie (incumbent)	145,139	62.82	−10.29
Democratic	Megan Wingfield	81,112	35.10	+8.21
Independent	Thomas A. Loecken	4,807	2.08	N/A
Total votes		231,058	100.0	N/A
Republican hold				

== District 3 ==
2026 Kentucky's 3rd congressional district election
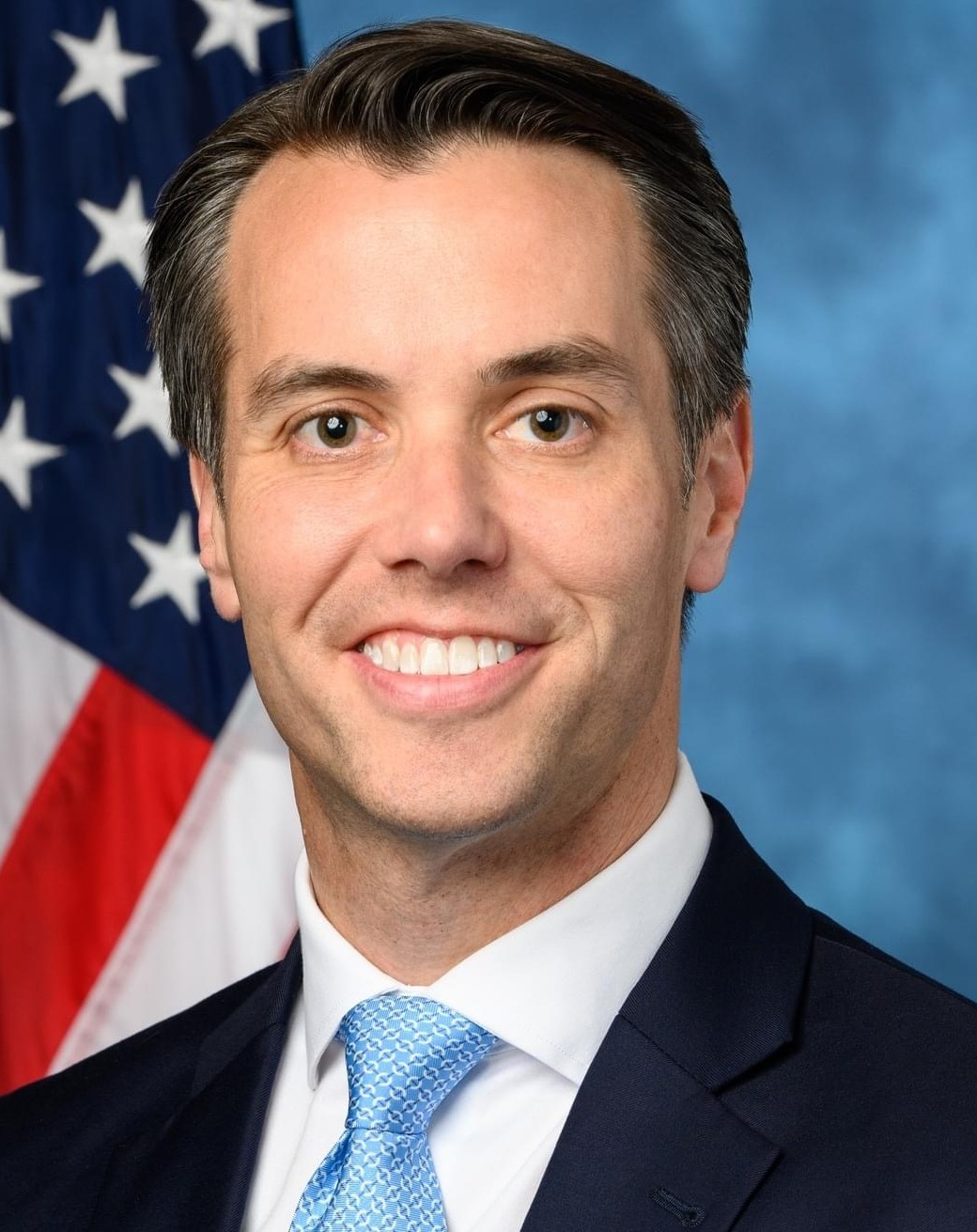

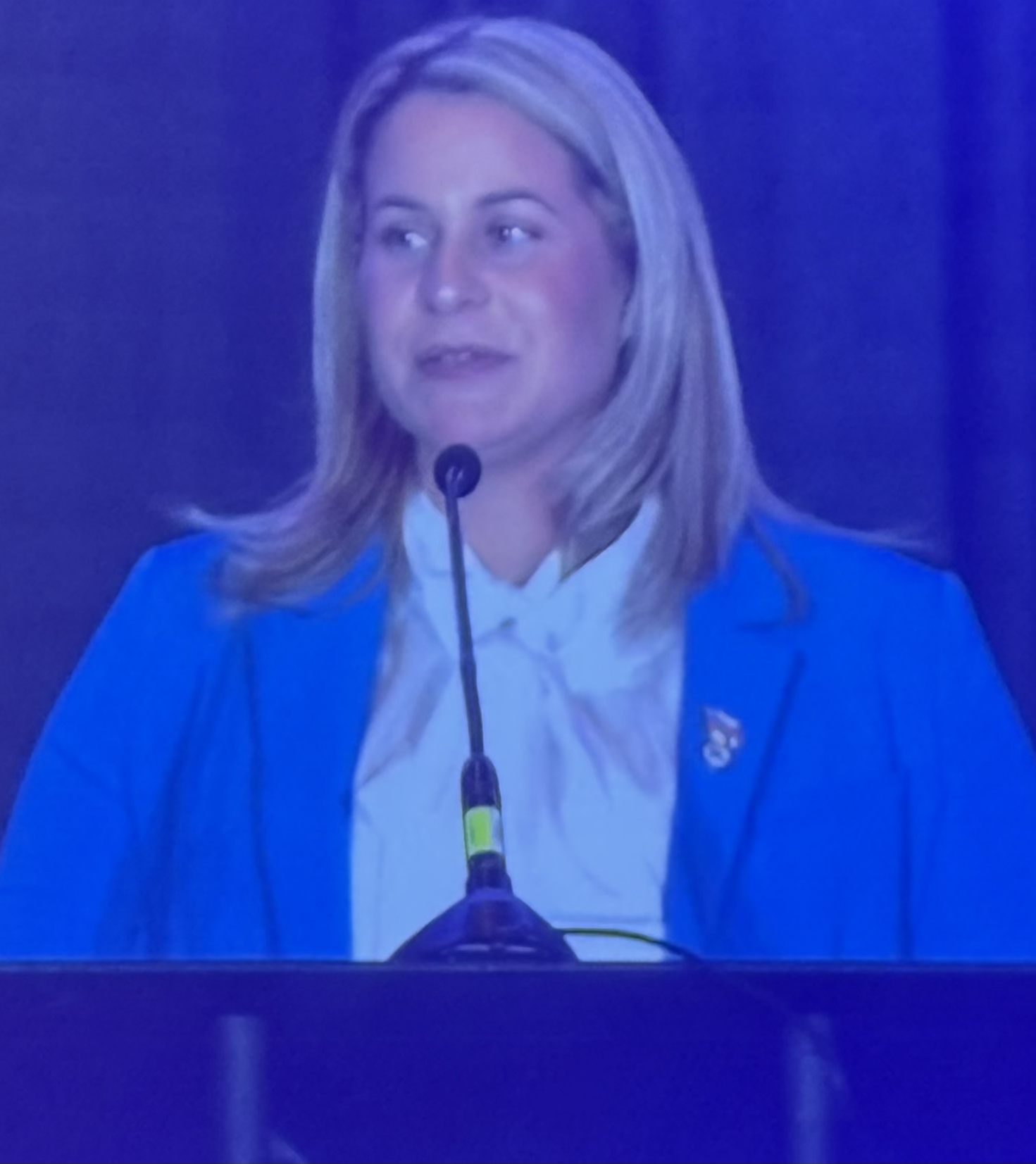
Nominee	Morgan McGarvey	Maria Rodriguez
Party	Democratic	Republican
Popular vote	174,781	73,719
Percentage	70.33%	29.67%
- McGarvey: 70–80%
U.S. representative before election
Morgan McGarvey
Democratic
Elected U.S. representative
Morgan McGarvey
Democratic

The 3rd district encompasses nearly all of Louisville Metro, which, since the merger of 2003, is consolidated with Jefferson County, though other incorporated cities, such as Shively and St. Matthews, exist within the county. The incumbent is Democrat Morgan McGarvey, who was re-elected with 61.9% of the vote in 2024.

=== Democratic primary ===
==== Nominee ====
- Morgan McGarvey, incumbent U.S. representative

==== Withdrawn ====
- Jared Randall, community activist

==== Endorsements ====
Morgan McGarvey

Organizations

- Joint Action Committee for Political Affairs
- League of Conservation Voters
- Planned Parenthood Action Fund

==== Fundraising ====
Campaign finance reports as of April 29, 2026
Candidate	Raised	Spent	Cash on hand
Morgan McGarvey (D)	$1,448,999	$986,553	$1,725,862
Source: Federal Election Commission

=== Republican primary ===
==== Nominee ====
- Maria Rodriguez, cleaning contractor

==== Eliminated in primary ====
- Daniel Cobble, carpet cleaner and perennial candidate
- David Nichter
- Donald Pay, entrepreneur and author

==== Fundraising ====
Campaign finance reports as of April 29, 2026
Candidate	Raised	Spent	Cash on hand
Donald Pay (R)	$2,546	$2,254	$291
Maria Rodriguez (R)	$18,620	$3,057	$15,562
Source: Federal Election Commission

==== Results ====
Republican primary results
Party	Candidate	Votes	%
Republican	Maria Teresa Rodriguez	15,855	48.2
Republican	David Joseph Nichter	6,807	20.7
Republican	Daniel Cobble	5,893	17.9
Republican	Donald Pay	4,313	13.1
Total votes		32,868	100.0

=== Independent candidates ===
==== Did not qualify ====
- Oumou Diallo, former PASTEF activist and candidate for the Senegalese National Assembly in 2024

==== Fundraising ====
Campaign finance reports as of April 29, 2026
Candidate	Raised	Spent	Cash on hand
Oumou Diallo (I)	$2,493	$1,312	$1,180
Source: Federal Election Commission

=== General election ===
==== Predictions ====
Source	Ranking	As of
Decision Desk HQ	Safe D	July 14, 2026
The Cook Political Report	Solid D	February 6, 2025
Inside Elections	Solid D	March 7, 2025
Sabato's Crystal Ball	Safe D	June 3, 2025

==== Post-primary endorsements ====
Morgan McGarvey (D)

Organizations

- Giffords

==== Fundraising ====
Campaign finance reports as of October 14, 2026
Candidate	Raised	Spent	Cash on hand
Morgan McGarvey (D)	$1,998,328	$1,327,900	$1,933,846
Maria Rodriguez (R)	$75,079	$42,618	$32,361
Source: Federal Election Commission

==== Results ====
2026 Kentucky's 3rd congressional district election
Party	Candidate	Votes	%	±%
Democratic	Morgan McGarvey (incumbent)	174,781	70.33	+8.39
Republican	Maria Teresa Rodriguez	73,719	29.67	−8.37
Total votes		248,500	100.0	N/A
Democratic hold				

== District 4 ==
2026 Kentucky's 4th congressional district election

Nominee	Ed Gallrein	Melissa Strange
Party	Republican	Democratic
Popular vote	137,623	103,713
Percentage	54.22%	40.86%
- Gallrein: 50–60% 60–70% 70–80% Strange: 40–50%
U.S. representative before election
Thomas Massie
Republican
Elected U.S. representative
Ed Gallrein
Republican

The 4th district is located in the northeastern part of the state, along the Ohio River, including the suburbs of Cincinnati and the eastern suburbs of Louisville. The incumbent is Republican Thomas Massie, who was re-elected unopposed in 2024.

=== Republican primary ===
Thomas Massie, a libertarian Republican first elected in 2012, has frequently clashed with Donald Trump on fiscal and international issues both during and between his terms as president. By March 2025, Trump had openly called for a primary challenge to Massie in response to his votes on the 2025 federal budget. Other high-profile clashes between the two have included Massie's vote against the One Big Beautiful Bill Act, his advocacy for the release of the Epstein files, and his condemnation of U.S. strikes on Iranian nuclear sites.

On October 17, 2025, Trump endorsed farmer and retired Navy SEAL Ed Gallrein for the seat. On October 21, Gallrein announced his candidacy, challenging Massie. On May 11, 2026, the primary became the most expensive U.S. House primary in American history, with over $25.6 million in ad spending beating the prior record of $25.2 million from the Democratic primary for New York's 16th congressional district in 2024. By May 17, ad spending exceeded $32 million, with pro-Israel interest groups accounting for over $9 million of the spending against Massie. Massie described the primary election as a "referendum on whether Israel gets to buy seats in Congress," while others described it as a referendum on Trump.

During the campaign, pro-Massie and pro-Gallrein PACs both used AI-generated political ads to attack each other's campaigns. One AI-generated ad from pro-Gallrein PAC MAGA KY included imagery of Massie having a threesome with pro-Palestinian Democratic representatives Ilhan Omar and Alexandria Ocasio-Cortez. Massie, Omar, and former Rep. Marjorie Taylor Greene condemned the ad, with Greene accusing the ad of violating the TAKE IT DOWN Act. On May 16, a pro-Trump group announced that Secretary of Defense Pete Hegseth would visit Kentucky to raise support for Gallrein. Hegseth's move was accused by critics of violating the Hatch Act, which the White House denied. During the campaign, Gallrein declined to debate Massie, ignored most interview requests, and conducted few public rallies.

On May 19, Gallrein obtained the Republican nomination, defeating Massie 54.9% to 45.1%. Massie conceded the election on election night, joking in his concession speech that "it took a while to find Ed Gallrein in Tel Aviv." AIPAC later sent out an announcement on X, stating that "support for America's alliance with Israel is good policy and good politics."

==== Nominee ====
- Ed Gallrein, farmer, retired Navy SEAL, and candidate for Kentucky's 7th Senate district in 2024

==== Eliminated in primary ====
- Thomas Massie, incumbent U.S. representative

==== Withdrawn ====
- Niki Lee Ethington, registered nurse
- Dennis Jackson, farmer
- Robert Wells, physician

==== Declined ====
- Daniel Cameron, former Kentucky Attorney General (2019–2024), and nominee for governor in 2023 (unsuccessfully ran for U.S. Senate)

==== Endorsements ====
Ed Gallrein

Executive branch officials

- Pete Hegseth, U.S. secretary of defense (2025–present)
- Donald Trump, president of the United States (2017–2021, 2025–present)

U.S. senators

- Tim Sheehy, Montana (2025–present)

U.S. representatives

- Andy Barr, KY-06 (2013–present)
- Erin Houchin, IN-09 (2023–present)

Individuals

- Nate Morris, businessman and 2026 U.S. Senate candidate

Organizations

- U.S. Chamber of Commerce
Thomas Massie

U.S. senators

- Rand Paul, Kentucky (2011–present)

U.S. representatives

- Justin Amash, former MI-03 (2011–2021)
- Lauren Boebert, CO-04 (2021–present)
- Warren Davidson, OH-08 (2016–present)
- Matt Gaetz, former FL-01 (2017–2024)
- Marjorie Taylor Greene, former GA-14 (2021–2026)
- Dana Rohrabacher, former CA-48 (1989–2019)
- Victoria Spartz, IN-05 (2021–present)

State legislators

- Savannah Maddox, HD-61 (2021–present)
- Robin L. Webb, SD-18 (2009–present)
- Gex Williams, SD-20 (2023–present) and SD-24 (1993–1999)

Individuals

- James Fishback, investor and 2026 Florida gubernatorial candidate
- Zachary Levi, actor
- Kyle Rittenhouse, gun rights advocate

Organizations

- Kentucky Right to Life
- MAHA PAC
Declined to endorse

Statewide officials

- Trey Grayson, former Secretary of State of Kentucky (2004–2011)
- Ron DeSantis, governor of Florida (2019–present)

==== Polling ====
Poll source	Date(s) administered	Sample size (Note: Key: A – all adults RV – registered voters LV – likely voters V – unclear)	Margin of error	Ed Gallrein	Thomas Massie	Other	Undecided
Big Data Poll (R)	May 16–18, 2026	587 (LV)	± 4.0%	50% (Note: With voters who lean towards a given candidate)	50%	−	−
Big Data Poll (R)	May 16–18, 2026	587 (LV)	± 4.0%	44%	43%	−	13%
Grayhouse (R)	May 16–17, 2026	435 (LV)	± 4.7%	51%	44%	−	5%
Big Data Poll (R)	May 15–17, 2026	555 (LV)	± 4.0%	50%	50%	−	−
Big Data Poll (R)	May 15–17, 2026	555 (LV)	± 4.0%	44%	43%	−	13%
SoCal Strategies (R)	May 15–16, 2026	450 (LV)	–	49%	42%	−	9%
Big Data Poll (R)	May 14–16, 2026	510 (LV)	± 4.0%	49%	51%	−	−
Big Data Poll (R)	May 14–16, 2026	510 (LV)	± 4.0%	43%	44%	−	13%
Neighborhood Research and Media (R)	May 12–15, 2026	291 (LV)	± 6.0%	39%	39%	−	22%
Big Data Poll (R)	May 12–14, 2026	518 (LV)	± 4.0%	49%	51%	−	−
Quantus Insights (R)	May 11–12, 2026	908 (LV)	± 3.3%	53%	45%	−	2%
Quantus Insights (R)	May 11–12, 2026	908 (LV)	± 3.3%	48%	43%	−	8%
Quantus Insights (R)	April 6–7, 2026	438 (LV)	± 4.4%	38%	47%	2% (Note: "Would not vote" with 2%)	14%
Big Data Poll (R)	April 3–7, 2026	433 (LV)	± 4.0%	48%	52%	–	–

Hypothetical polling

Thomas Massie vs. Niki Lee Ethington

Poll source	Date(s) administered	Sample size	Margin of error	Thomas Massie	Niki Lee Ethington	Undecided
Kaplan Strategies (R)	June 23–24, 2025	368 (LV)	± 5.1%	19%	31%	50%

Thomas Massie vs. "Trump-endorsed Republican"

Poll source	Date(s) administered	Sample size	Margin of error	Thomas Massie	Trump-endorsed Republican	Undecided
McLaughlin & Associates (R) (Note: Poll sponsored by MAGA PAC, which opposes Massie.)	June 2025	–	–	23%	52%	25%

==== Fundraising ====
Italics indicate a withdrawn candidate.

Campaign finance reports as of April 29, 2026
Candidate	Raised	Spent	Cash on hand
Ed Gallrein (R)	$3,163,892	$2,620,239	$543,653
Dennis Jackson (R)	$2,590	$2,590	$0
Thomas Massie (R)	$5,541,900	$5,840,666	$608,244
Robert Wells (R)	$113,241	$94,102	$19,139
Source: Federal Election Commission

==== Debate ====
2026 Kentucky's 4th district congressional debate
Date	Host	Moderators	Republican	Republican
Key: P Participant I Invited W Withdrawn A Absent N Not invited				
Key: P Participant I Invited W Withdrawn A Absent N Not invited			Thomas Massie	Ed Gallrein
May 4, 2026	Kentucky Educational Television	Renee Shaw	P	A

==== Results ====
Results by county: Gallrein: 50–60%; 60–70%; Massie: 50–60%; 60–70%

Republican primary results
Party	Candidate	Votes	%
Republican	Ed Gallrein	57,822	54.9
Republican	Thomas Massie (incumbent)	47,539	45.1
Total votes		105,361	100.0

=== Democratic primary ===
==== Nominee ====
- Melissa Strange, businesswoman

==== Eliminated in primary ====
- Jesse Brewer, inventory management professional

==== Withdrawn ====
- Monica Dean, project manager

==== Fundraising ====
Italics indicate a withdrawn candidate.

Campaign finance reports as of April 29, 2026
Candidate	Raised	Spent	Cash on hand
Jesse Brewer (D)	$9,680	$9,722	$0
Monica Dean (D)	$9,189	$5,518	$3,671
Melissa Strange (D)	$69,085	$56,277	$12,808
Source: Federal Election Commission

==== Results ====
Democratic primary results
Party	Candidate	Votes	%
Democratic	Melissa Claire Strange	30,108	72.4
Democratic	Jesse Russell Brewer	11,461	27.6
Total votes		41,569	100.0

=== Libertarian Party ===
==== Nominee ====
- Jeremy Todd, salesperson

=== Kentucky Party ===
==== Withdrawn ====
- Mohammad Wael Ahmad

=== Write-in candidates ===
==== Declared ====
- Peter Harmon Williams

=== General election ===
==== Predictions ====
Source	Ranking	As of
Decision Desk HQ	Safe R	July 14, 2026
The Cook Political Report	Solid R	February 6, 2025
Inside Elections	Solid R	March 7, 2025
Sabato's Crystal Ball	Safe R	June 3, 2025

==== Post-primary endorsements ====
Melissa Strange (D)

Organizations

- National Women's Political Caucus
Jeremy Todd (L)

Executive branch officials

- Joe Kent, former director of the National Counterterrorism Center (2025–2026) (Republican)

U.S. representatives

- Cynthia McKinney, former GA-4 (1997-2003, 2005–2007) and GA-11 (1993-1997) (Green)
- Ron Paul, former TX-22 (1976–1977, 1979–1985) and TX-14 (1997–2013) (Republican)

Organizations

- Anti-Zionist America PAC

Political parties

- Libertarian Party of Kentucky

==== Fundraising ====
Campaign finance reports as of October 14, 2026
Candidate	Raised	Spent	Cash on hand
Ed Gallrein (R)	$4,095,784	$3,662,249	$433,535
Melissa Strange (D)	$157,330	$123,485	$40,742
Jeremy Todd (L)	$30,838	$27,449	$3,389
Source: Federal Election Commission

==== Results ====
2026 Kentucky's 4th congressional district election
Party	Candidate	Votes	%	±%
Republican	Ed Gallrein	137,623	54.22	−45.38
Democratic	Melissa Claire Strange	103,713	40.86	N/A
Libertarian	Jeremy Todd	12,484	4.92	N/A
Write-in		15	0.01	N/A
Total votes		253,835	100.0	N/A
Republican hold				

== District 5 ==
2026 Kentucky's 5th congressional district election
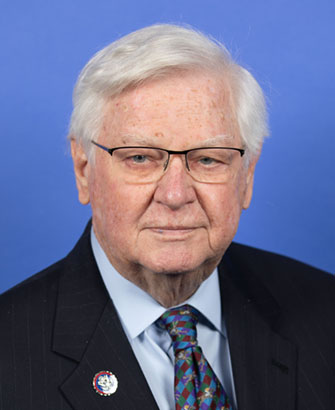

Nominee	Hal Rogers	Ned Pillersdorf
Party	Republican	Democratic
Popular vote	139,808	49,805
Percentage	71.16%	25.35%
- Rogers: 50–60% 60–70% 70–80% 80–90%
U.S. representative before election
Hal Rogers
Republican
Elected U.S. representative
Hal Rogers
Republican

The 5th district is based in the coalfields of eastern Kentucky. The incumbent is Republican House dean Hal Rogers, who was re-elected unopposed in 2024.

=== Republican primary ===
==== Nominee ====
- Hal Rogers, incumbent U.S. representative

==== Eliminated in primary ====
- Benjamin Hurley, real estate agent
- Brandon Monhollon, realtor and veteran
- Jerry Lee Shelton, electrician and Crab Orchard city commissioner
- Kevin Smith, political strategist

==== Declined ====
- Alan Keck, mayor of Somerset and candidate for governor in 2023

==== Endorsements ====
Hal Rogers

Executive branch officials

- Donald Trump, 45th and 47th president of the United States (2017–2021, 2025–present)

Organizations

- AIPAC

==== Fundraising ====
Campaign finance reports as of April 29, 2026
Candidate	Raised	Spent	Cash on hand
Hal Rogers (R)	$747,740	$858,906	$860,086
Kevin Smith (R)	$110,370	$90,131	$20,238
Source: Federal Election Commission

==== Results ====
Republican primary results
Party	Candidate	Votes	%
Republican	Hal Rogers (incumbent)	81,554	77.4
Republican	Kevin Smith	12,312	11.7
Republican	Benjamin Hurley	5,537	5.3
Republican	Brandon R. Monhollon	3,458	3.3
Republican	Jerry Lee Shelton	2,464	2.3
Total votes		105,325	100.0

=== Democratic primary ===
==== Nominee ====
- Ned Pillersdorf, attorney, candidate for this district in 1992, and husband of former Kentucky Supreme Court justice Janet Stumbo

==== Endorsements ====
Ned Pillersdorf

Executive branch officials

- Martin O'Malley, former Social Security Administration Commissioner (2023–2024) and former governor of Maryland (2007–2015)

==== Fundraising ====
Campaign finance reports as of April 29, 2026
Candidate	Raised	Spent	Cash on hand
Ned Pillersdorf (D)	$115,581	$32,060	$83,521
Source: Federal Election Commission

=== Independents ===
==== Candidates ====
- Gerardo Serrano
- Mikel Wein, archaeologist

=== Write-in candidates ===
==== Declared ====
- Billy Ray Wilson, veteran and activist

=== General election ===
==== Predictions ====
Source	Ranking	As of
Decision Desk HQ	Safe R	July 14, 2026
The Cook Political Report	Solid R	February 6, 2025
Inside Elections	Solid R	March 7, 2025
Sabato's Crystal Ball	Safe R	June 3, 2025

==== Post-primary endorsements ====
Hal Rogers

Executive branch officials

- Donald Trump, 45th and 47th president of the United States (2017–2021, 2025–present)

Organizations

- AIPAC
Ned Pillersdorf

Statewide officials

- Paul E. Patton, former governor of Kentucky (1995-2003)

Executive branch officials

- Martin O'Malley, former Social Security Administration Commissioner (2023–2024) and former governor of Maryland (2007–2015)

==== Fundraising ====
Campaign finance reports as of October 14, 2026
Candidate	Raised	Spent	Cash on hand
Hal Rogers (R)	$1,026,114	$1,295,442	$701,924
Ned Pillersdorf (D)	$377,089	$270,620	$106,494
Source: Federal Election Commission

==== Results ====
2026 Kentucky's 5th congressional district election
Party	Candidate	Votes	%	±%
Republican	Hal Rogers (incumbent)	139,808	71.16	−28.84
Democratic	Ned Pillersdorf	49,805	25.35	N/A
Independent	Mikel Wein	4,117	2.10	N/A
Independent	Gerardo Serrano	2,738	1.39	N/A
Write-in		8	0.00	N/A
Total votes		196,476	100.0	N/A
Republican hold				

== District 6 ==
2026 Kentucky's 6th congressional district election

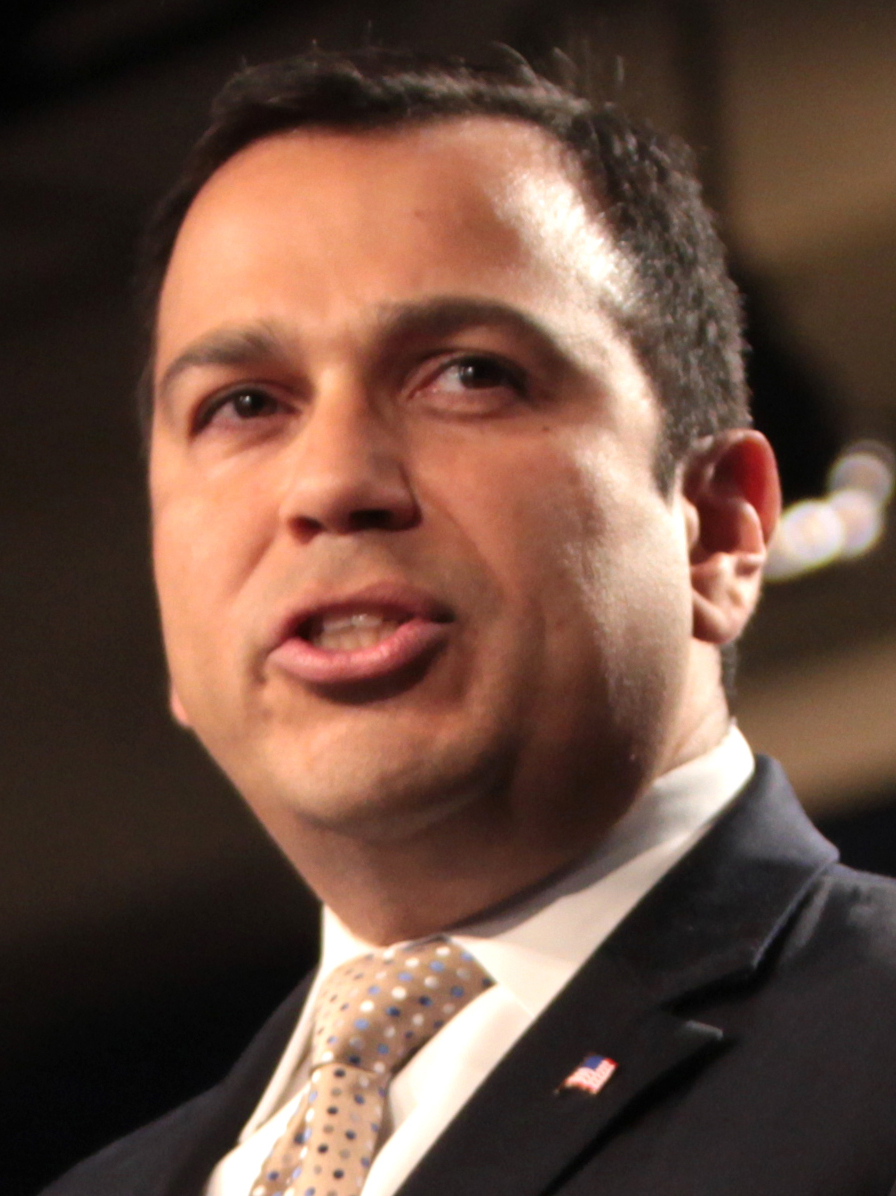
Nominee	Zach Dembo	Ralph Alvarado
Party	Democratic	Republican
Popular vote	138,777	114,030
Percentage	52.65%	43.27%
- Dembo: 50–60% 60–70% Alvarado: 40–50% 50–60% 60–70%
U.S. representative before election
Andy Barr
Republican
Elected U.S. representative
Zach Dembo
Democratic

The 6th district is located in central Kentucky, taking in Lexington, Richmond, and Georgetown. The incumbent is Republican Andy Barr, who was re-elected with 63.0% of the vote in 2024.

On April 22, 2025, Barr announced that he would run for U.S. Senate in 2026.

Democrats last won this district in 2010, when Ben Chandler was narrowly reelected.

=== Republican primary ===
==== Nominee ====
- Ralph Alvarado, former Tennessee Commissioner of Health (2023–2025), former Kentucky state senator (2015–2023), and nominee for lieutenant governor in 2019

==== Eliminated in primary ====
- Ryan Dotson, state representative from the 73rd district
- Greg Plucinski, pharmaceutical entrepreneur
- Steve Shannon

==== Withdrawn ====
- Adam Perez Arquette (endorsed Alvarado, remained on ballot)
- Deanna Frazier Gordon, state representative from the 81st district (running for re-election)

==== Declined ====
- Andy Barr, incumbent U.S. representative (running for U.S. Senate)
- Amanda Mays Bledsoe, state senator from the 12th district
- Damon Thayer, former Majority Leader of the Kentucky Senate (2013–2025) (endorsed Alvarado)

==== Endorsements ====
Ralph Alvarado

Executive branch officials

- Donald Trump, president of the United States (2017–2021, 2025–present)

U.S. representatives

- Brett Guthrie, KY-02 (2009–present)
- Mike Johnson, speaker of the United States House of Representatives (2023–present) from LA-4 (2017–present)
- Jim Jordan, OH-04 (2007–present)
- Hal Rogers, KY-05 (1981–present)
- Matt Van Epps, TN-07 (2025–present)

State legislators

- Damon Thayer, former majority leader of the Kentucky Senate (2013–2025) from SD-17 (2003–2025)

Organizations

- U.S. Chamber of Commerce
Ryan Dotson

U.S. representatives

- Paul Gosar, AZ-09 (2011–present)

==== Fundraising ====
Italics indicate a withdrawn candidate.

Campaign finance reports as of March 31, 2026
Candidate	Raised	Spent	Cash on hand
Ralph Alvarado (R)	$808,804	$256,554	$552,250
Adam Perez Arquette (R)	$4,990,948	$1,672,032	$1,656,948
Ryan Dotson (R)	$517,084	$221,413	$295,671
Deanna Gordon (R)	$372,174	$101,051	$271,123
Greg Plucinski (R)	$620,019	$389,451	$230,568
Source: Federal Election Commission

==== Polling ====
Poll source	Date(s) administered	Sample size	Margin of error	Ralph Alvarado	Adam Perez Arquette	Ryan Dotson	Greg Plucinski	Steve Shannon	Undecided
	May 12, 2026	Arquette withdraws from the race							
1892 Polling (R) (Note: Poll sponsored by Alvarado's campaign)	May 4–7, 2026	400 (LV)	± 4.9%	38%	1%	15%	8%	3%	35%
1892 Polling (R)	April 6–8, 2026	– (LV)	–	32%	0%	11%	6%	1%	50%
1892 Polling (R)	February 10–12, 2026	– (LV)	–	21%	1%	13%	0%	2%	63%

==== Debates ====
2026 Republican primary debates
No.	Date	Host	Moderator	Link	Participants				
Key: P Participant A Absent N Non-invitee I Invitee W Withdrawn
Key: P Participant A Absent N Non-invitee I Invitee W Withdrawn					Ralph Alvarado	Adam Perez Arquette	Ryan Dotson	Greg Plucinski	Steve Shannon
1	February 26, 2026	Spectrum News 1 Kentucky	Mario Anderson		P	N	P	N	N

==== Results ====
Results by county: Alvarado: 40–50%; 50–60%; 60–70%

Republican primary results
Party	Candidate	Votes	%
Republican	Ralph Alvarado	36,217	56.5
Republican	Ryan Dotson	16,897	26.4
Republican	Gregory George Plucinski	5,670	8.8
Republican	Steve Shannon	3,980	6.2
Republican	Adam Perez Arquette (withdrawn)	1,332	2.1
Total votes		64,096	100.0

=== Democratic primary ===
==== Nominee ====
- Zach Dembo, former federal prosecutor

==== Eliminated in primary ====
- Jimmy Ausbrooks, mental health counselor and perennial candidate
- Harvey Carroll, real estate developer and consultant
- Corey Edwards
- David Kloiber, former Lexington city councilor and runner-up for mayor of Lexington in 2022
- Erin Petrey, sustainability and infrastructure professional, bourbon writer and educator
- Cherlynn Stevenson, former state representative from the 88th district (2019–2025)

==== Declined ====
- Chad Aull, state representative from the 79th district (2023–present)
- Ben Chandler, former U.S. representative (2004–2013) (endorsed Dembo)
- Jacqueline Coleman, Lieutenant Governor of Kentucky (2019–present) (endorsed Stevenson)

==== Endorsements ====
Zach Dembo

U.S. representatives

- Ben Chandler, KY-06 (2004–2013)

Local officials

- Jim Gray, mayor of Lexington (2011–2019)

Newspapers

- Lexington Herald-Leader (Democratic primary only)

Organizations

- National Education Association
- VoteVets
- With Honor Fund
Erin Petrey

Organizations

- Track AIPAC
- Progressive Victory
Cherlynn Stevenson

U.S. representatives

- Lois Frankel, FL-22 (2013–2017, 2023–present)

Statewide officials

- Jacqueline Coleman, lieutenant governor of Kentucky (2019–present)
- Paul E. Patton, former governor of Kentucky (1995–2003)

Organizations

- Elect Democratic Women
- EMILYs List

==== Fundraising ====
Campaign finance reports as of December 31, 2025
Candidate	Raised	Spent	Cash on hand
Zach Dembo (D)	$552,182	$208,900	$343,282
David Kloiber (D)	$195,955	$51,340	$144,614
Erin Petrey (D)	$174,307	$53,721	$120,585
Cherlynn Stevenson (D)	$453,005	$328,062	$125,118
Source: Federal Election Commission

==== Polling ====
Poll source	Date(s) administered	Sample size	Margin of error	Jimmy Ausbrooks	Zach Dembo	Corey Edwards	David Kloiber	Erin Petrey	Cherlynn Stevenson	Other	Undecided
Normington Petts (D) (Note: Poll commissioned by EMILY's List, which supports Stevenson)	April 6–9, 2026	430 (LV)	± 4.9%	2%	13%	4%	2%	6%	27%	1% (Note: Harvey Carroll with 1%)	44%

==== Results ====
Democratic primary results
Party	Candidate	Votes	%
Democratic	Zach Dembo	26,858	39.6
Democratic	Cherlynn Stevenson	21,312	31.5
Democratic	Erin Petrey	10,703	15.8
Democratic	David Kloiber	3,041	4.5
Democratic	Corey Edwards	2,952	4.4
Democratic	Harvey Carroll Jr.	1,958	2.9
Democratic	Jimmy Clifton Ausbrooks	940	1.4
Total votes		67,764	100.0

=== Third-party and indepedents ===
==== Candidates ====
- Pete Lynch (Kentucky Party), political science lecturer
- Jay Bowman (Independent), businessman and presidential candidate in 2024
- Robert Quigley (Write-in)

=== General election ===
==== Predictions ====
Source	Ranking	As of
Decision Desk HQ	Tossup	November 3, 2026
The Cook Political Report	Tossup	October 23, 2026
Inside Elections	Tossup	October 29, 2026
Sabato's Crystal Ball	Lean R	November 2, 2026

==== Post-primary endorsements ====
Zach Dembo (D)

U.S. representatives

- Suzan DelBene, WA-01 (2012–present)
- Adam Gray, CA-13 (2025–present)

Statewide officials

- Andy Beshear, governor of Kentucky (2019–present)
- Mikie Sherrill, governor of New Jersey (2026–present)

Labor unions

- National Education Association

Organizations

- Blue Dog PAC
- DCCC Red to Blue
- J Street
- Jewish Democratic Council of America
- League of Conservation Voters
- New Democrat Coalition Action Fund

==== Fundraising ====
Campaign finance reports as of October 14, 2026
Candidate	Raised	Spent	Cash on hand
Ralph Alvarado (R)	$2,307,369	$2,126,558	$180,812
Zach Dembo (D)	$3,205,462	$2,585,132	$620,330
Jay Bowman (I)	$18,958	$18,183	$216
Source: Federal Election Commission

==== Polling ====
Poll source	Date(s) administered	Sample size	Margin of error	Ralph Alvarado (R)	Zach Dembo (D)	Other	Undecided
Public Policy Polling (D) (Note: Poll sponsored by the House Majority PAC, which is focused on electing Democrats to the U.S. House of Representatives)	October 19–20, 2026	572 (LV)	—	41%	47%	—	12%
DCCC (D)	October 2–5, 2026	606 (LV)	± 4.0%	40%	46%	6% (Note: Jay Bowman (I) with 5%; Pete Lynch (KP) with 1%)	8%
Change Research (D) (Note: Poll sponsored by Kentuckians Not Corruption, which supports Dembo)	September 29 – October 5, 2026	524 (LV)	± 4.4%	38%	47%	7% (Note: "A third-party candidate" with 7%)	8%
Lake Research Partners (D)	September 30 – October 4, 2026	400 (LV)	—	40%	47%	4% (Note: Jay Bowman (I) with 3%; Pete Lynch (KP) with 1%)	10%
Lake Research Partners (D)	September 30 – October 4, 2026	400 (LV)	—	45%	48%	—	7%
GQR (D) (Note: Poll sponsored by Dembo's campaign)	September 25–30, 2026	401 (LV)	± 4.9%	37%	42%	11% (Note: Jay Bowman (I) & Pete Lynch (KP) together with 11%)	9%
GQR (D)	September 25–30, 2026	401 (LV)	± 4.9%	43%	46%	—	11
Lake Research Partners (D)	August 17–23, 2026	400 (LV)	± 4.0%	44%	45%	—	11%
DCCC (D)	July 29–30, 2026	474 (V)	± 4.5%	47%	47%	—	6%
GQR (D)	June 24–28, 2026	440 (V)	—	42%	39%	—	19%
	May 19, 2026	Primary elections					
Public Policy Polling (D)	April 24–25, 2026	675 (RV)	± 3.8%	37%	37%	—	26%

Hypothetical polling

Ralph Alvarado vs. Cherlynn Stevenson

Poll source	Date(s) administered	Sample size	Margin of error	Ralph Alvarado (R)	Cherlynn Stevenson (D)	Undecided
Public Policy Polling (D)	April 24–25, 2026	675 (RV)	± 3.8%	37%	36%	27%

Ryan Dotson vs. Zach Dembo

Poll source	Date(s) administered	Sample size	Margin of error	Ryan Dotson (R)	Zach Dembo (D)	Undecided
Public Policy Polling (D)	April 24–25, 2026	675 (RV)	± 3.8%	33%	38%	29%

Ryan Dotson vs. Cherlynn Stevenson

Poll source	Date(s) administered	Sample size	Margin of error	Ryan Dotson (R)	Cherlynn Stevenson (D)	Undecided
Public Policy Polling (D)	April 24–25, 2026	675 (RV)	± 3.8%	37%	36%	27%

==== Results ====
2026 Kentucky's 6th congressional district election
Party	Candidate	Votes	%	±%
Democratic	Zach Dembo	138,777	52.65	+15.69
Republican	Ralph Alvarado	114,030	43.27	−19.77
Independent	Jay J. Bowman	6,710	2.55	N/A
Kentucky	Pete Lynch	3,836	1.46	N/A
Write-in		208	0.08	N/A
Total votes		263,561	100.0	N/A
Democratic gain from Republican				

== Notes ==
Partisan clients

== See also ==
- Elections in Kentucky
- Political party strength in Kentucky
- Kentucky Democratic Party
- Kentucky Republican Party
- Government of Kentucky
- 2026 United States Senate election in Kentucky
- 2026 United States elections
