= Third party (U.S. politics) =

US political parties other than the two major parties

James B. Weaver won five states in 1892.

Theodore Roosevelt won six states in 1912, four more than sitting president William Howard Taft.

Robert M. La Follette won his home state of Wisconsin in 1924.

Strom Thurmond won four states in 1948.

George Wallace won five states in 1968.

Third party, or minor party, is a term used in the United States' two-party system for political parties other than the Democratic and Republican parties. The Electoral College for presidential elections and the plurality voting system for most other elections have established a two-party system in American politics. Third parties are most often encountered in presidential elections; while third-party candidates rarely win elections, they can have an effect on them through vote splitting and other impacts.

With few exceptions, the U.S. system has two major parties which have won, on average, 98% of all state and federal seats. According to Duverger's law, two main political parties emerge in political systems with plurality voting in single-member districts. In this case, votes for minor parties can potentially be regarded as splitting votes away from the most similar major party. Third-party vote splitting exceeded a president's margin of victory in three elections: 1844, 2000, and 2016.

Minor parties have rarely been competitive with the major parties, occasionally replacing one of the major parties in the 19th century. No third-party candidate has won the presidency since the Republican Party became the second major party in 1856 and won in 1860. Since then, a third-party candidate won states in five elections: 1892, 1912, 1924, 1948, and 1968. 1992 was the last time a third-party candidate placed second in any state, and 1996 was the last time a third-party candidate got over 5% of the vote nationally.

== Notable exceptions ==
Greens, Libertarians, and others have elected state legislators and local officials. The Socialist Party elected hundreds of local officials in 169 cities in 33 states by 1912, including Milwaukee, Wisconsin; New Haven, Connecticut; Reading, Pennsylvania; and Schenectady, New York. There have been governors elected as independents, and from such parties as the Progressive Bull Moose Party, Wisconsin Progressive Party–National Progressives, Reform, Farmer-Labor, Populist, and Prohibition. After losing a Republican primary in 2010, Bill Walker of Alaska won a single term in 2014 as an independent by joining forces with the Democratic nominee. In 1998, wrestler Jesse Ventura was elected governor of Minnesota on the Reform Party ticket.

Sometimes a national officeholder that is not a member of any party is elected. Previously, Senator Lisa Murkowski won re-election in 2010 as a write-in candidate after losing the Republican primary to a Tea party candidate, and Senator Joe Lieberman ran and won reelection to the Senate as an "Independent Democrat" in 2006 after losing the Democratic primary. As of 2025, there are only two U.S. senators, Angus King and Bernie Sanders, who identify as Independent and both caucus with the Democrats.

The last time a third-party candidate carried any states in a presidential race was George Wallace in 1968, while the last third-party candidate to finish runner-up or greater was former president Teddy Roosevelt's 2nd-place finish on the Bull Moose Party ticket in 1912. The only three U.S. presidents without a major party affiliation upon election were George Washington, John Tyler, and Andrew Johnson, and only Washington served his entire tenure as an independent. Neither of the other two were ever elected president in their own right, both being vice presidents who ascended to office upon the death of the president, and both became independents because they were unpopular with their parties. John Tyler was elected on the Whig ticket in 1840 with William Henry Harrison, but was expelled by his own party. Johnson was the running mate for Abraham Lincoln, who was reelected on the National Union ticket in 1864; it was a temporary name for the Republican Party.

== More favorable electoral systems for third parties ==
=== Electoral fusion ===
Electoral fusion in the United States is an arrangement where two or more United States political parties on a ballot list the same candidate, allowing that candidate to receive votes on multiple party lines in the same election.

Electoral fusion is also known as fusion voting, cross endorsement, multiple party nomination, multi-party nomination, plural nomination and ballot freedom.

Electoral fusion was once widespread in the U.S. and legal in every state. However, as of 2024, it remains legal and common only in New York and Connecticut.

=== Ranked-choice voting ===
Ranked-choice voting in the US by state, as of March 2026 Some state-wide elections Local option for municipalities to opt-in Local elections in some jurisdictions Ranked choice voting banned state-wide

Ranked-choice voting (RCV) can refer to one of several ranked voting methods used in some cities and states in the United States. The term refers to the general category of voting systems where voters rank candidates. In the US, the specific system is most often instant-runoff voting (IRV) or single transferable vote (STV), the main difference between the two being whether only one winner or multiple winners are elected. At the federal and state level, instant-runoff voting is used for congressional and presidential elections in Maine; state, congressional, and presidential general elections in Alaska; and special congressional elections in Hawaii. Since 2025, it is also used for all elections in the District of Columbia.

Single transferable voting, only possible in multi-winner contests, is not currently used in state or congressional elections. It is used to elect city councillors in Portland, Oregon, Cambridge, Massachusetts, and several other cities.

As of April 2025, RCV is used for local elections in 47 US cities including Salt Lake City, Utah and Seattle, Washington. It has also been used by some state political parties in party-run primaries and nominating conventions. As a contingency in the case of a runoff election, ranked ballots are used by overseas voters in six states.

Since 2020, voters in seven states have rejected ballot initiatives that would have implemented, or allowed legislatures to implement, ranked-choice voting. As of March 2026, ranked-choice voting has also been banned in nineteen states. Complexity, cost, difficulty of voting, and issues of transparency have been cited as barriers to adoption.

=== Approval voting ===
On an approval ballot, the voter can select any number of candidates.

Approval voting is a single-winner rated voting system where voters approve of any number of candidates named on a ballot, and the candidate with the most votes is victorious. The method is designed to eliminate vote-splitting while keeping election administration simple and easy to count, requiring only a single score for each candidate. Proponents of approval voting argue that the system more accurately represents candidates not belonging to a major party.

While approval voting is primarily considered in single-winner contexts, application to multiple-winner contexts is also possible. For example, if there are ten seats to be filled, the ten most-voted candidates would be selected. Winners can be selected in a single round of approval voting, but preliminary "narrowing" rounds can be included.

Approval voting has been used in both organizational and political elections to improve representativeness and voter satisfaction. As the number of candidates a voter may approve of is unlimited, approval voting is immune to overvoting.

=== Proportional representation ===
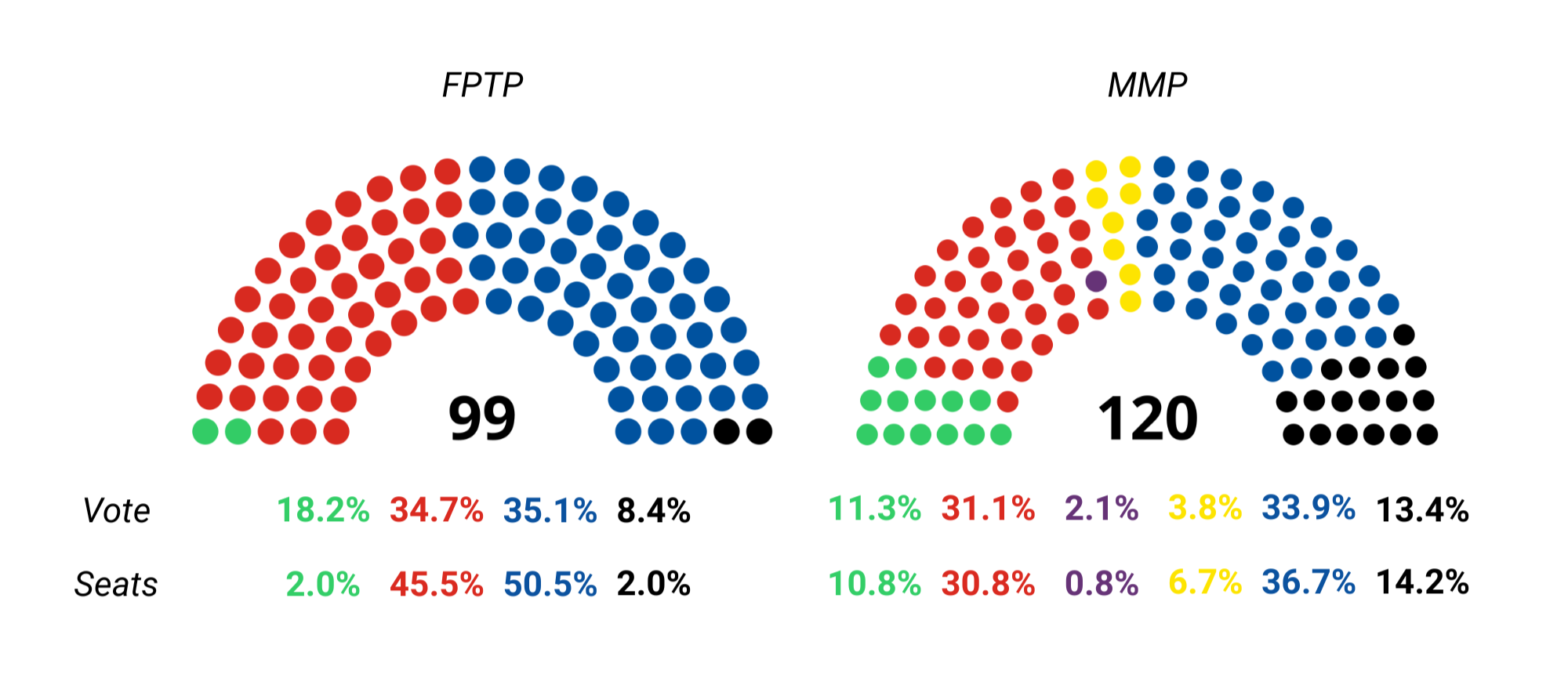
On the left are the results of the last first-past-the-post election in New Zealand before the implementation of mixed-member proportional representation in 1996. PR systems aim to align vote percentage with seat distribution. The 1996 seat results (right) matched the popular vote more closely than the 1993 election.

Proportional representation (PR) is achieved by any electoral system under which subgroups of an electorate are reflected proportionately in the elected body. The party make-up of the elected representatives reflects the party make-up of the votes cast. The concept applies to representation of political parties and also other divisions of voters.

The term is used for any of the various electoral systems that produce proportional representation. The aim of such systems is that all votes cast, or at least a large proportion, are used to elect someone and that each representative in an assembly is elected by a roughly equal number of votes, and thus all (or most) votes have equal weight. Under other election systems, a slight majority in a district – or even just a minority of votes when it forms a plurality – is all that is needed to elect a member or group of members. PR systems provide balanced representation to different factions, usually defined by parties, reflecting how votes were cast.

In closed list PR systems where only a choice of parties is allowed, the seats are allocated to parties in proportion to the vote tally or vote share each party receives. Under open list PR systems and candidate-based PR systems (such as the single transferable vote), the winning candidates are elected both on personal appeal and party label.

Exact proportionality is never achieved under PR systems, except by chance. The use of electoral thresholds that are intended to limit the representation of small, often extreme parties reduces proportionality in list systems, and any insufficiency in the number of levelling seats reduces proportionality in mixed-member proportional (MMP) or additional-member systems. Under single-transferable-vote (STV) or party-list PR systems, districts with a small or moderate number of seats allow local representation but may reduce proportionality. Any use of districts dividing the electorate creates a possibility of somewhat disproportionate results. Other sources of disproportionality arise from electoral tactics, such as party splitting in some MMP systems, where the voters' true intent is difficult to determine.

Nonetheless, PR systems approximate proportionality much better than single-member plurality voting (SMP) and block voting. PR systems also are more resistant to gerrymandering and other forms of manipulation.

Some PR systems do not necessitate the use of parties; others do. The most widely used families of PR electoral systems are party-list PR, used in 85 countries; mixed-member PR (MMP), used in 7 countries; and single transferable vote (STV), used in Ireland, Malta, the Australian Senate, and the Indian Rajya Sabha. Proportional representation systems are used at all levels of government and are also used for elections to non-governmental bodies, such as corporate boards.

== Barriers to third party success ==
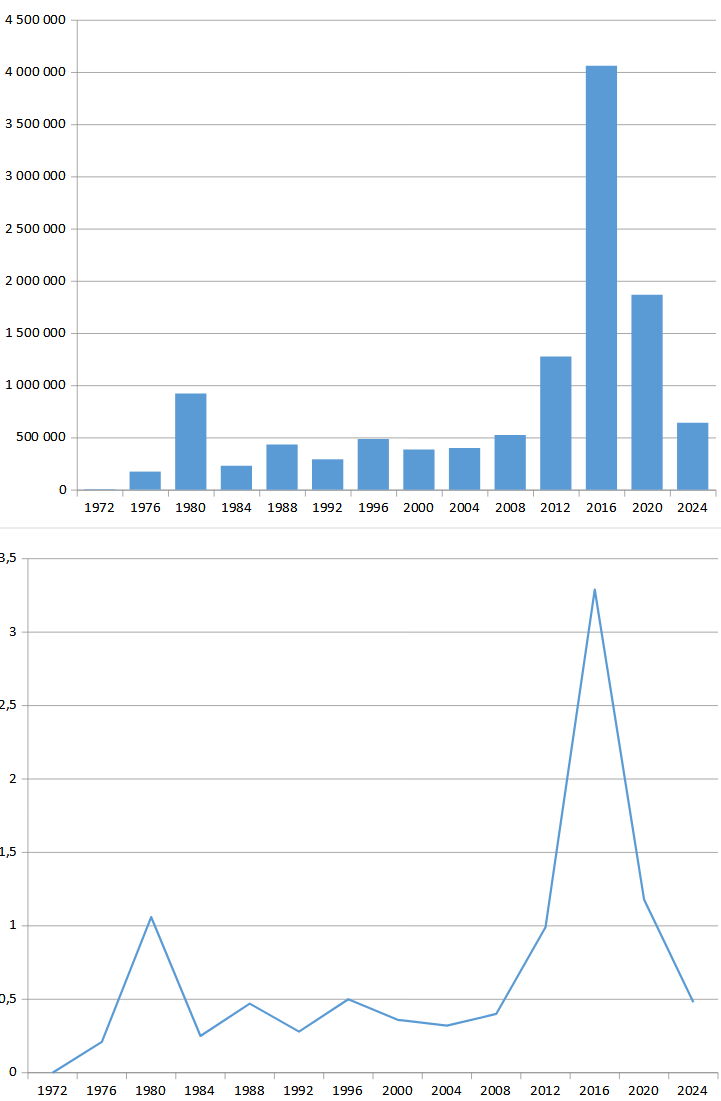
The presidential election results for all Libertarian Party candidates from 1972 to 2024

=== Winner-take-all vs. proportional representation ===
In winner-take-all (or plurality voting), the candidate with the largest number of votes wins, even if the margin of victory is extremely narrow or the proportion of votes received is not a majority. Unlike in proportional representation, runners-up do not gain representation in a first-past-the-post system. In the United States, systems of proportional representation are uncommon, especially above the local level and are entirely absent at the national level (even though states like Maine have introduced systems like ranked-choice voting, which ensures that the voice of third party voters is heard in case none of the candidates receives a majority of preferences). In Presidential elections, the majority requirement of the Electoral College, and the Constitutional provision for the House of Representatives to decide the election if no candidate receives a majority, serves as a further disincentive to third party candidacies.

In the United States, if an interest group is at odds with its traditional party, it has the option of running sympathetic candidates in primaries. Candidates failing in the primary may form or join a third party. Because of the difficulties third parties face in gaining any representation, third parties tend to exist to promote a specific issue or personality. Often, the intent is to force national public attention on such an issue. Then, one or both of the major parties may rise to commit for or against the matter at hand, or at least weigh in. H. Ross Perot eventually founded a third party, the Reform Party, to support his 1996 campaign. In 1912, Theodore Roosevelt made a spirited run for the presidency on the Progressive Party ticket, but he never made any efforts to help Progressive congressional candidates in 1914, and in the 1916 election, he supported the Republicans.

Micah Sifry argues that despite years of discontentment with the two major parties in the United States, third parties should try to arise organically at the local level in places where ranked-choice voting and other more democratic systems can build momentum, rather than starting with the presidency, a proposition incredibly unlikely to succeed. However, this ignores that in some states a third party is required to have a presidential candidate in order to also run local level candidates.

=== Spoiler effect ===
Strategic voting often leads to a third-party that underperforms its poll numbers with voters wanting to make sure their vote helps determine the winner. In response, some third-party candidates express ambivalence about which major party they prefer and their possible role as spoiler or deny the possibility. The US presidential elections most consistently cited as having been spoiled by third-party candidates are 1844, 2000, and 2016.This phenomenon becomes more controversial when a third-party candidate receives help from supporters of another candidate hoping they play a spoiler role.

=== Ballot access laws ===
Nationally, ballot access laws require candidates to pay registration fees and provide signatures if a party has not garnered a certain percentage of votes in previous elections. In recent presidential elections, Ross Perot appeared on all 50 state ballots as an independent in 1992 and the candidate of the Reform Party in 1996. Perot, a billionaire, was able to provide significant funds for his campaigns. Patrick Buchanan appeared on all 50 state ballots in the 2000 election, largely on the basis of Perot's performance as the Reform Party's candidate four years prior. The Libertarian Party has appeared on the ballot in at least 46 states in every election since 1980, except for 1984 when David Bergland gained access in only 36 states. In 1980, 1992, 1996, 2016, and 2020 the party made the ballot in all 50 states and D.C. The Green Party gained access to 44 state ballots in 2000 but only 27 in 2004. The Constitution Party appeared on 42 state ballots in 2004. Ralph Nader, running as an independent in 2004, appeared on 34 state ballots. In 2008, Nader appeared on 45 state ballots and the D.C. ballot.

=== Debate rules ===
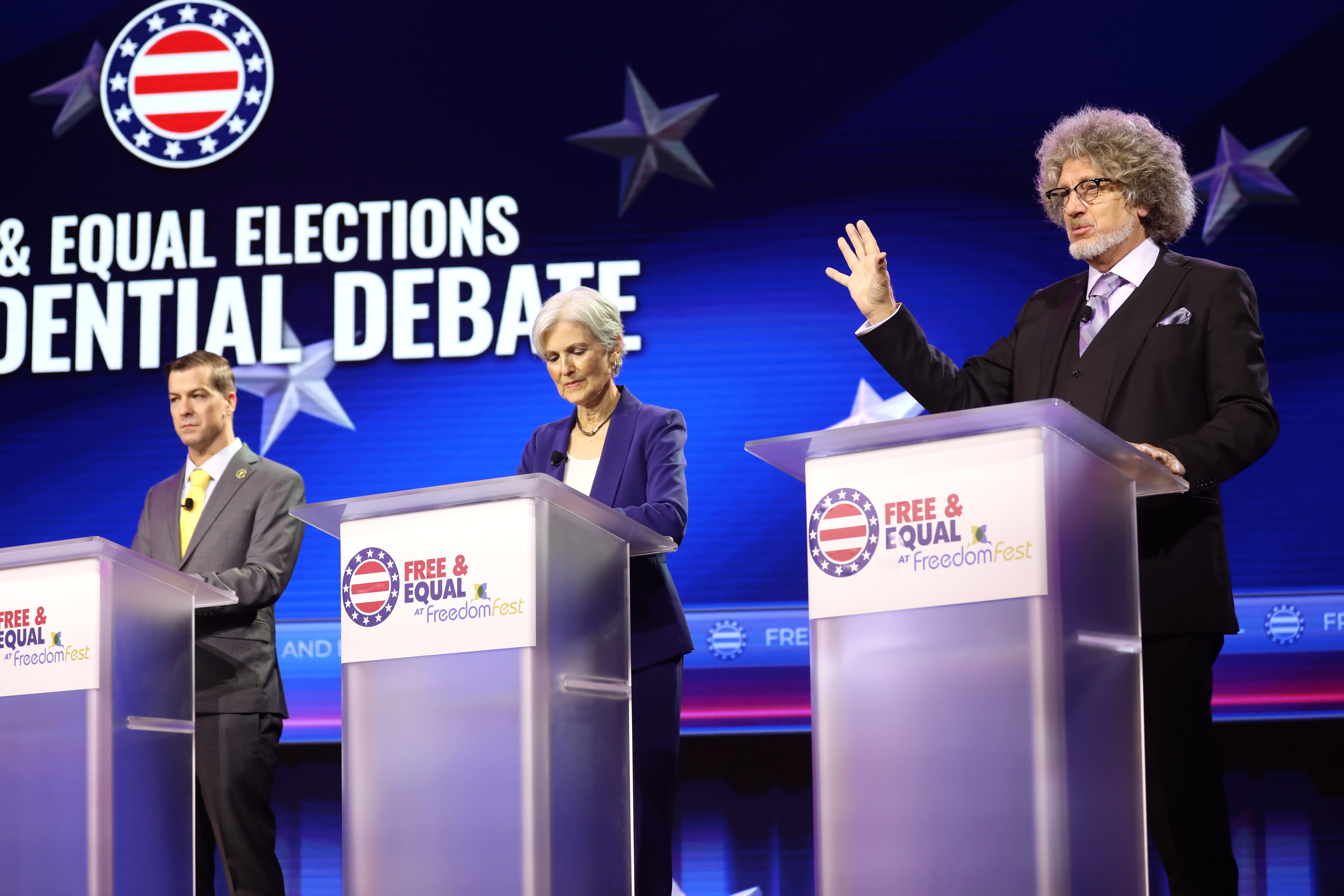
From left to right: Libertarian, Green, and Constitution candidates at a 2024 Free & Equal debate in Las Vegas

Presidential debates between the nominees of the two major parties first occurred in 1960, then after three cycles without debates, resumed in 1976. Third party or independent candidates have been in debates in only two cycles. Ronald Reagan and John Anderson debated in 1980, but incumbent President Carter refused to appear with Anderson, and Anderson was excluded from the subsequent debate between Reagan and Carter. Independent Ross Perot was included in all three of the debates with Republican George H. W. Bush and Democrat Bill Clinton in 1992, largely at the behest of the Bush campaign. His participation helped Perot climb from 7% before the debates to 19% on Election Day.

Perot did not participate in the 1996 debates. In 2000, revised debate access rules made it even harder for third-party candidates to gain access by stipulating that, besides being on enough state ballots to win an Electoral College majority, debate participants must clear 15% in pre-debate opinion polls. This rule has been in effect since 2000. The 15% criterion, had it been in place, would have prevented Anderson and Perot from participating in the debates in which they appeared. Debates in other state and federal elections often exclude independent and third-party candidates, and the Supreme Court has upheld this practice in several cases. The Commission on Presidential Debates (CPD) is a private company.

The Free & Equal Elections Foundation hosts various debates and forums with third-party candidates during presidential elections.

=== Major parties adopt third-party platforms ===
They can draw attention to issues that may be ignored by the majority parties. If such an issue finds acceptance with the voters, one or more of the major parties may adopt the issue into its own party platform. A third-party candidate will sometimes strike a chord with a section of voters in a particular election, bringing an issue to national prominence and amount a significant proportion of the popular vote. Major parties often respond to this by adopting this issue in a subsequent election. After 1968, under President Nixon the Republican Party adopted a "Southern Strategy" to win the support of conservative Democrats opposed to the Civil Rights Movement and resulting legislation and to neutralize right-wing third-party movements. This can be seen as a response to the popularity of segregationist candidate George Wallace who gained 13.5% of the popular vote in the 1968 election for the American Independent Party. In 1996, both the Democrats and the Republicans agreed to deficit reduction on the back of Ross Perot's popularity in the 1992 election. This severely undermined Perot's campaign in the 1996 election.

However, changing positions can be costly for a major party. For example, in the US 2000 Presidential election Magee predicts that Gore shifted his positions to the left to account for Nader, which lost him some valuable centrist voters to Bush. In cases with an extreme minor candidate, not changing positions can help to reframe the more competitive candidate as moderate, helping to attract the most valuable swing voters from their top competitor while losing some voters on the extreme to the less competitive minor candidate.

== Current U.S. third parties ==
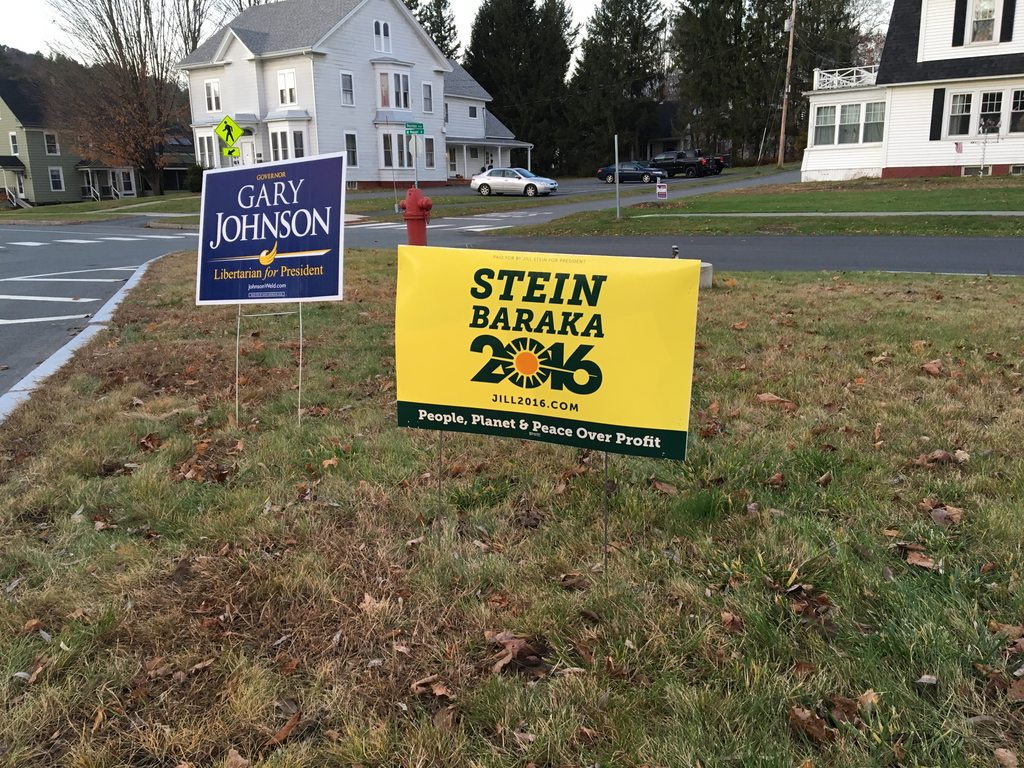
Currently, the Libertarian and Green parties are the largest in the U.S. after the Republican and Democratic parties. Shown here are signs of their 2016 campaigns, respectively.

=== Largest ===
Top 5 U.S. third parties by registration (2024)
Party	No. registrations	% registered voters
Libertarian Party	704,455	0.44%
Green Party	249,276	0.13%
Conservative Party of New York State	164,826	0.10%
Peace and Freedom Party	138,238	0.09%
No Labels	109,920	0.07%

=== Smaller parties (listed by ideology) ===
This section includes only parties that have actually run candidates under their name in recent years.

==== Right-wing ====
This section includes any party that advocates positions associated with American conservatism, including both Old Right and New Right ideologies.

- Christian Liberty Party
- Constitution Party

===== State-only right-wing parties =====
- Alaskan Party
- American Independent Party (California)
- Constitution Party of Oregon
- Libertarian Party of New Hampshire

==== Centrist ====
This section includes any party that is independent, populist, or any other that either rejects left–right politics or does not have a party platform.

- Alliance Party
- American Solidarity Party
- Citizens Party
- Forward Party/Forward
- Liberal Party USA
- Reform Party of the United States of America
- United States Pirate Party
- United States Transhumanist Party
- Unity Party of America

===== State-only centrist parties =====
- Cascade Party of Washington
- Colorado Center Party
- Moderate Party of New Jersey
- Moderate Party of Rhode Island
- Independent Party of Delaware
- Independent Party of Oregon

==== Left-wing ====
This section includes any party that has a left-liberal, progressive, social democratic, democratic socialist, or Marxist platform.

- American Communist Party
- Communist Party USA
- Freedom Socialist Party
- People's Party
- Progressive Labor Party
- Party for Socialism and Liberation
- Peace and Freedom Party
- Socialist Action
- Social Democrats, USA
- Socialist Equality Party
- Socialist Alternative
- Socialist Party USA
- Socialist Workers Party
- Working Class Party
- Workers World Party
- Working Families Party

===== State-only left-wing parties =====
- Charter Party (Cincinnati, Ohio, only)
- Green Mountain Peace and Justice Party (Vermont)
- Green Party of Alaska
- Green Party of Rhode Island
- Kentucky Party
- Labor Party (South Carolina Workers Party)
- Liberal Party of New York
- Oregon Progressive Party
- Progressive Dane (Dane county, Wisconsin)
- United Independent Party (Massachusetts)
- Vermont Progressive Party
- Washington Progressive Party

==== Ethnic nationalism ====
This section includes parties that primarily advocate for granting special privileges or consideration to members of a certain race, ethnic group, religion etc.

- American Freedom Party
- Black Riders Liberation Party
- National Socialist Movement
- New Afrikan Black Panther Party

Also included in this category are various parties found in and confined to Native American reservations, almost all of which are solely devoted to the furthering of the tribes to which the reservations were assigned. An example of a particularly powerful tribal nationalist party is the Seneca Party that operates on the Seneca Nation of New York's reservations.

==== Secessionist parties ====
This section includes parties that primarily advocate for Independence from the United States. (Specific party platforms may range from left wing to right wing).

- Aloha ʻĀina Party (Hawaii)
- California National Party

==== Single-issue/protest-oriented ====
This section includes parties that primarily advocate single-issue politics (though they may have a more detailed platform) or may seek to attract protest votes rather than to mount serious political campaigns or advocacy.

- Grassroots–Legalize Cannabis Party
- Legal Marijuana Now Party
- Prohibition Party
- United States Marijuana Party

===== State-only parties =====
- Approval Voting Party (Colorado)
- Natural Law Party (Michigan)
- New York State Right to Life Party
- Rent Is Too Damn High Party (New York)

== Electoral results ==
=== 1944 ===
Third-party candidates and results for 1944
Candidate	Party	Votes	Percentage	Best state percentage
Unpledged Elector	Texas Regulars	143,238	0.30%	Texas: 11.77%
Norman Thomas	Socialist	79,017	0.16%	Wisconsin: 0.99%
Claude A. Watson	Prohibition	74,758	0.16%	Indiana: 0.75%
Other		57,004	0.12%	—N/a
Total		346,218	0.72%	—N/a

=== 1948 ===
Third-party candidates and results for 1948
Candidate	Party	Votes	Percentage	Best state percentage
Strom Thurmond	States' Rights Democratic	1,176,023	2.41%	Mississippi: 87.17%
Henry A. Wallace	Progressive	1,157,328	2.37%	New York: 8.25%
Norman Thomas	Socialist	139,569	0.29%	Wisconsin: 0.98%
Other		150,069	0.30%	—N/a
Total		2,623,896	5.38%	—N/a

=== 1952 ===
Third-party candidates and results for 1952
Candidate	Party	Votes	Percentage	Best state percentage
Vincent Hallinan	Progressive	140,746	0.23%	New York: 0.90%
Stuart Hamblen	Prohibition	73,412	0.12%	Indiana: 0.78%
Eric Hass	Socialist Labor	30,406	0.05%	New Jersey: 0.24%
Other		56,759	0.09%	—N/a
Total		299,967	0.49%	—N/a

=== 1956 ===
Third-party candidates and results for 1956
Candidate	Party	Votes	Percentage	Best state percentage
Unpledged Elector	Independent	196,318	0.32%	South Carolina: 29.45%
T. Coleman Andrews	States' Rights	108,956	0.18%	Virginia: 6.16%
Eric Hass	Socialist Labor	44,450	0.07%	Washington: 0.65%
Other		65,047	0.10%	—N/a
Total		414,771	0.67%	—N/a

=== 1960 ===
Third-party candidates and results for 1960
Candidate	Party	Votes	Percentage	Best state percentage
Unpledged Elector	Democratic	286,359	0.42%	Alabama: 38.99%
Eric Hass	Socialist Labor	47,525	0.07%	Washington: 0.88%
Rutherford Decker	Prohibition	46,203	0.07%	Kansas: 0.45%
Other		123,255	0.18%	—N/a
Total		503,342	0.73%	—N/a

=== 1964 ===
Third-party candidates and results for 1964
Candidate	Party	Votes	Percentage	Best state percentage
Unpledged Elector	Democratic	210,732	0.30%	Alabama: 30.55%
Eric Hass	Socialist Labor	45,189	0.06%	Washington: 0.62%
Clifton DeBerry	Socialist Workers	32,706	0.05%	Colorado: 0.33%
Other		48,118	0.07%	—N/a
Total		336,745	0.48%	—N/a

=== 1968 ===
Third-party candidates and results for 1968
Candidate	Party	Votes	Percentage	Best state percentage
George Wallace	American Independent	9,901,118	13.53%	Alabama: 65.86%
Henning Blomen	Socialist Labor	52,589	0.07%	Colorado: 0.37%
Dick Gregory	Peace and Freedom	47,149	0.06%	New York: 0.36%
Other		143,521	0.20%	—N/a
Total		10,144,377	13.86%	—N/a

=== 1972 ===
Third-party candidates and results for 1972
Candidate	Party	Votes	Percentage	Best state percentage
John G. Schmitz	American Independent	1,100,896	1.42%	Idaho: 9.30%
Linda Jenness	Socialist Workers	83,380	0.11%	Arizona: 4.74%
Benjamin Spock	People's	78,759	0.10%	California: 0.66%
Other		139,063	0.18%	—N/a
Total		1,402,098	1.80%	—N/a

=== 1976 ===
Third-party candidates and results for 1976
Candidate	Party	Votes	Percentage	Best state percentage
Eugene McCarthy	Independent	744,763	0.91%	Oregon: 3.90%
Roger MacBride	Libertarian	172,557	0.21%	Alaska: 5.49%
Lester Maddox	American Independent	170,373	0.21%	Idaho: 1.74%
Other		472,572	0.58%	—N/a
Total		1,560,265	1.91%	—N/a

=== 1980 ===
Third-party candidates and results for 1980
Candidate	Party	Votes	Percentage	Best state percentage
John B. Anderson	Independent	5,719,850	6.61%	Massachusetts: 15.15%
Ed Clark	Libertarian	921,128	1.06%	Alaska: 11.66%
Barry Commoner	Citizens	233,052	0.27%	Oregon: 1.15%
Other		252,303	0.29%	—N/a
Total		7,126,333	8.24%	—N/a

=== 1984 ===
Third-party candidates and results for 1984
Candidate	Party	Votes	Percentage	Best state percentage
David Bergland	Libertarian	228,111	0.25%	Alaska: 3.07%
Lyndon LaRouche	Independent	78,809	0.09%	Virginia: 0.62%
Sonia Johnson	Citizens	72,161	0.08%	Louisiana: 0.56%
Other		241,328	0.26%	—N/a
Total		620,409	0.67%	—N/a

=== 1988 ===
Third-party candidates and results for 1988
Candidate	Party	Votes	Percentage	Best state percentage
Ron Paul	Libertarian	431,750	0.47%	Alaska: 2.74%
Lenora Fulani	New Alliance	217,221	0.24%	D.C.: 1.50%
David Duke	Populist	47,004	0.05%	Louisiana: 1.14%
Other		202,638	0.22%	—N/a
Total		898,613	0.98%	—N/a

=== 1992 ===
Third-party candidates and results for 1992
Candidate	Party	Votes	Percentage	Best state percentage
Ross Perot	Independent	19,743,821	18.91%	Maine: 30.44%
Andre Verne Marrou	Libertarian	290,087	0.28%	New Hampshire: 0.66%
Bo Gritz	Populist	106,152	0.10%	Utah: 3.84%
Other		269,507	0.24%	—N/a
Total		20,409,567	19.53%	—N/a

=== 1996 ===
Third-party candidates and results for 1996
Candidate	Party	Votes	Percentage	Best state percentage
Ross Perot	Reform	8,085,294	8.40%	Maine: 14.19%
Ralph Nader	Green	684,871	0.71%	Oregon: 3.59%
Harry Browne	Libertarian	485,759	0.50%	Arizona: 1.02%
Other		419,986	0.43%	—N/a
Total		9,675,910	10.04%	—N/a

=== 2000 ===
Third-party candidates and results for 2000
Candidate	Party	Votes	Percentage	Best state percentage
Ralph Nader	Green	2,882,955	2.74%	Alaska: 10.07%
Pat Buchanan	Reform	448,895	0.43%	North Dakota: 2.53%
Harry Browne	Libertarian	384,431	0.36%	Georgia: 1.40%
Other		232,920	0.22%	—N/a
Total		3,949,201	3.75%	—N/a

=== 2004 ===
Third-party candidates and results for 2004
Candidate	Party	Votes	Percentage	Best state percentage
Ralph Nader	Independent	465,650	0.38%	Alaska: 1.62%
Michael Badnarik	Libertarian	397,265	0.32%	Indiana: 0.73%
Michael Peroutka	Constitution	143,630	0.15%	Utah: 0.74%
Other		215,031	0.18%	—N/a
Total		1,221,576	1.00%	—N/a

=== 2008 ===
Third-party candidates and results for 2008
Candidate	Party	Votes	Percentage	Best state percentage
Ralph Nader	Independent	739,034	0.56%	Maine: 1.45%
Bob Barr	Libertarian	523,715	0.40%	Indiana: 1.06%
Chuck Baldwin	Constitution	199,750	0.12%	Utah: 1.26%
Other		404,482	0.31%	—N/a
Total		1,866,981	1.39%	—N/a

=== 2012 ===
Third-party candidates and results for 2012
Candidate	Party	Votes	Percentage	Best state percentage
Gary Johnson	Libertarian	1,275,971	0.99%	New Mexico: 3.60%
Jill Stein	Green	469,627	0.36%	Oregon/Maine: 1.10%
Virgil Goode	Constitution	122,389	0.11%	Wyoming: 0.58%
Other		368,124	0.28%	—N/a
Total		2,236,111	1.74%	—N/a

=== 2016 ===
Third-party candidates and results for 2016
Candidate	Party	Votes	Percentage	Best state percentage
Gary Johnson	Libertarian	4,489,341	3.28%	New Mexico: 9.34%
Jill Stein	Green	1,457,218	1.07%	Hawaii: 2.97%
Evan McMullin	Independent	731,991	0.54%	Utah: 21.54%
Other		1,149,700	0.84%	—N/a
Total		7,828,250	5.73%	—N/a

=== 2020 ===
Third-party candidates and results for 2020
Candidate	Party	Votes	Percentage	Best state percentage
Jo Jorgensen	Libertarian	1,865,535	1.18%	South Dakota: 2.63%
Howie Hawkins	Green	407,068	0.26%	Maine: 1.00%
Rocky De La Fuente	Alliance	88,241	0.06%	California: 0.34%
Other		561,311	0.41%	—N/a
Total		2,922,155	1.85%	—N/a

=== 2024 ===
third place winners by state

In 2023 and 2024, Robert F. Kennedy Jr. initially polled higher than any third-party presidential candidate since Ross Perot in the 1992 and 1996 elections. As Democrat Joe Biden withdrew from the race and the election grew closer, his poll numbers and notoriety would drop drastically.

Third-party candidates and results for 2024
Candidate	Party	Votes	Percentage	Best state percentage
Jill Stein	Green	868,693	0.56%	Maryland: 1.09%
Robert F. Kennedy Jr.	Independent	757,432	0.49%	Montana: 1.96%
Chase Oliver	Libertarian	650,109	0.42%	North Dakota: 1.69%
Claudia de la Cruz	Party for Socialism and Liberation	167,609	0.11%	California: 0.46%
Cornel West	Independent	84,018	0.05%	Vermont: 0.42%
Peter Sonski	American Solidarity	46,472	0.03%	Alaska: 0.21%
Randall Terry	Constitution	41,412	0.03%	South Carolina: 0.21%
Other		262,646	0.17%	—N/a
Total		3,058,275	1.91%	—N/a

== Maps ==
=== State wins ===
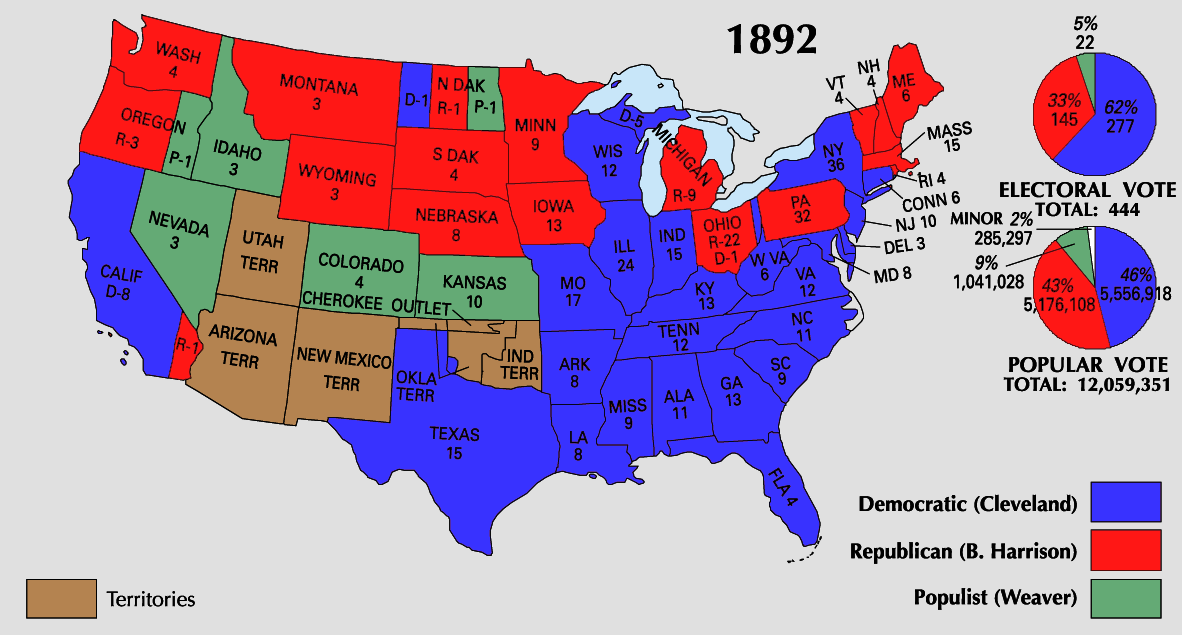
1892 United States presidential election; green denotes electoral votes won by James B. Weaver of the Populist Party.

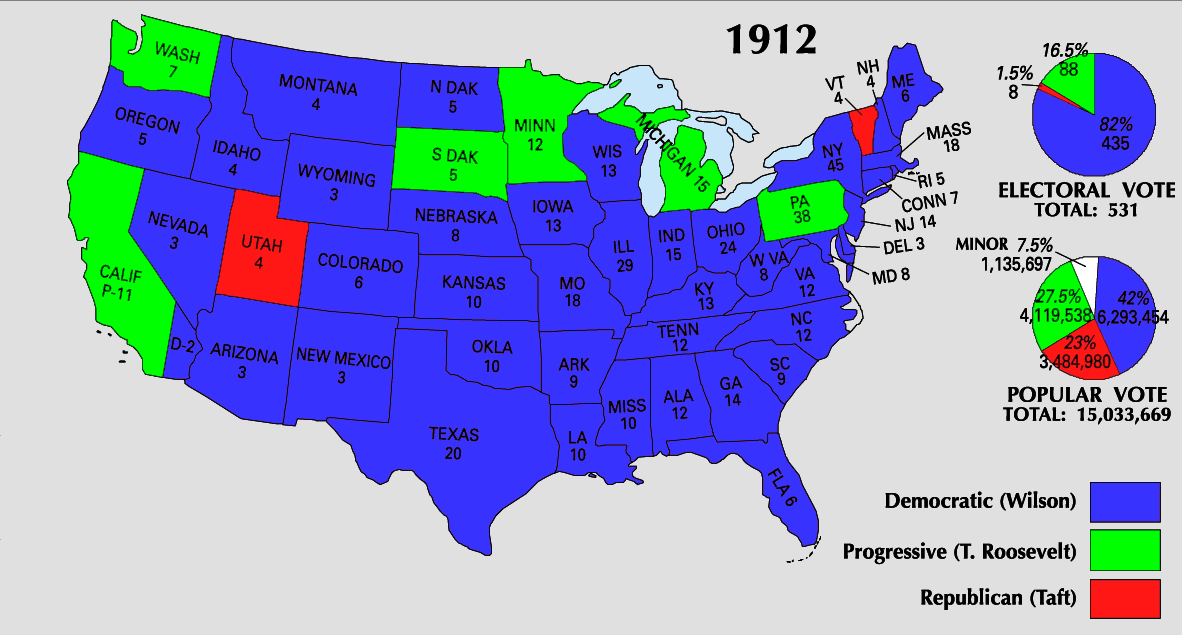
1912 United States presidential election; green denotes electoral votes won by Theodore Roosevelt of the Progressive Party.

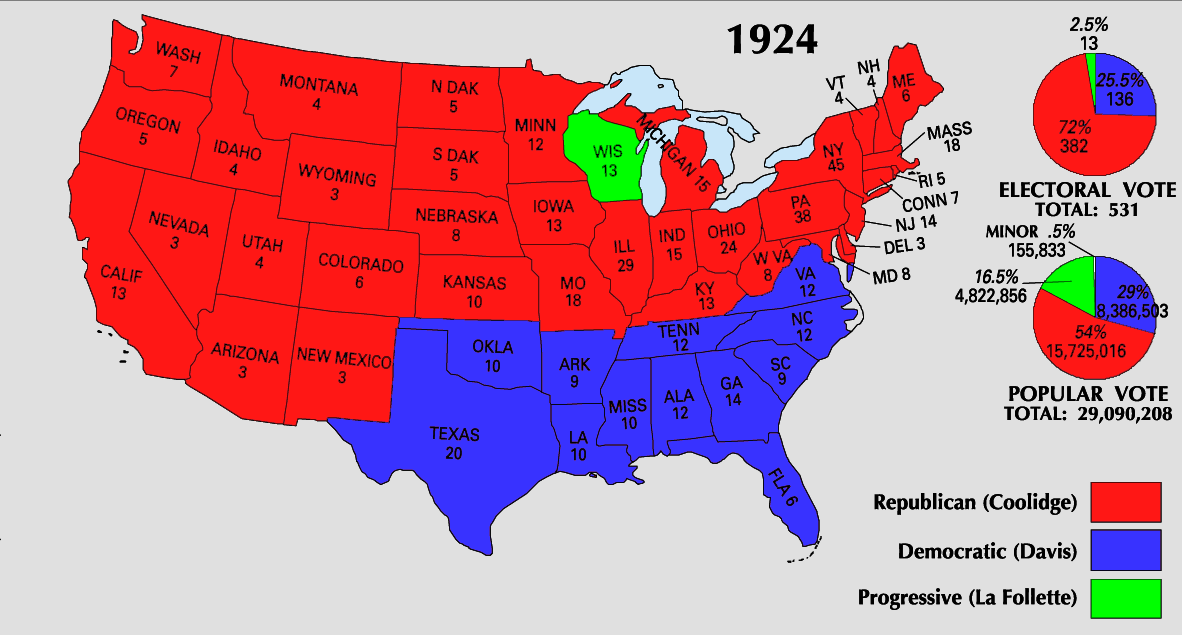
1924 United States presidential election; green denotes electoral votes won by Robert M. La Follette of the Progressive Party.

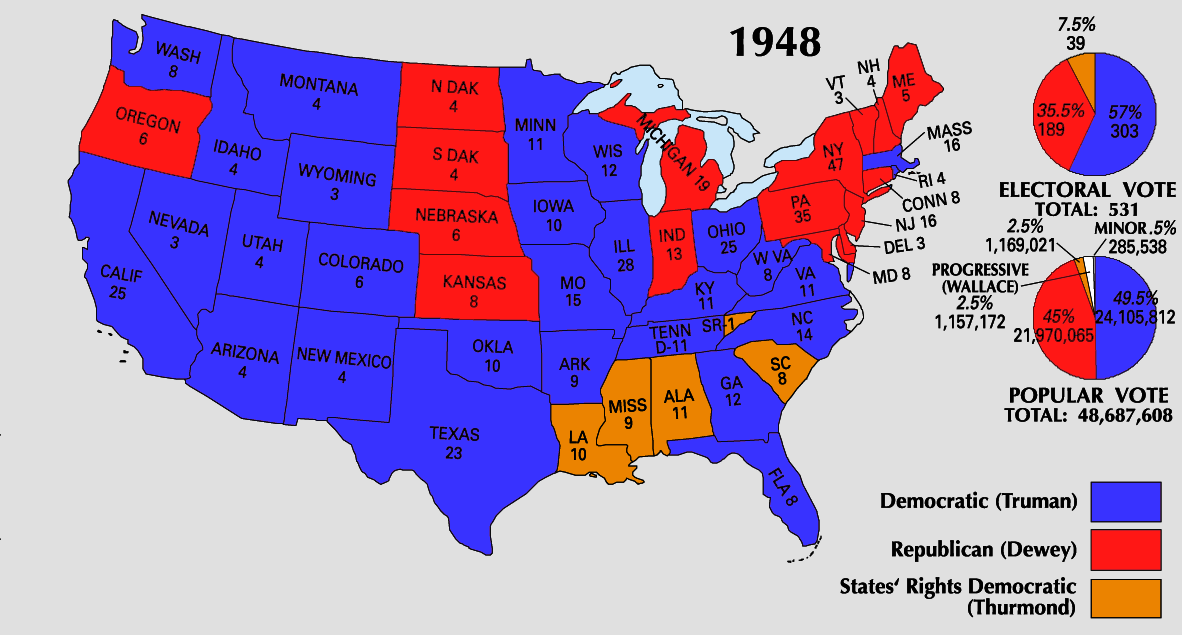
1948 United States presidential election; orange denotes electoral votes won by Strom Thurmond of the Dixiecrat.

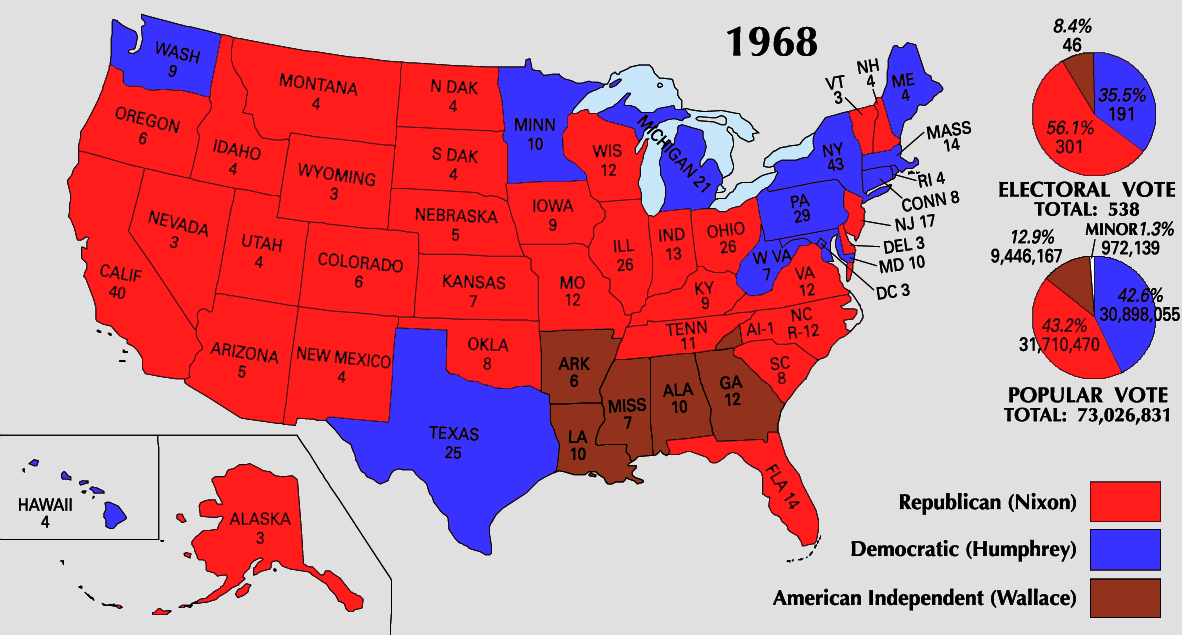
1968 United States presidential election; Brown denotes electoral votes won by George Wallace of the American Independent Party.

=== Vote percentages ===
Vote percentage received by Pat Buchanan in the 2000 US presidential election by state or territory

2000 United States presidential election results by county, shaded according to percentage of the vote for Green candidate Ralph Nader

2016 United States presidential election results by county, shaded according to percentage of the vote for Libertarian candidate Gary Johnson

2016 United States presidential election results by county, shaded according to percentage of the vote for Green candidate Jill Stein
