= Cherlynn Stevenson =

American politician and businesswoman (born 1976)

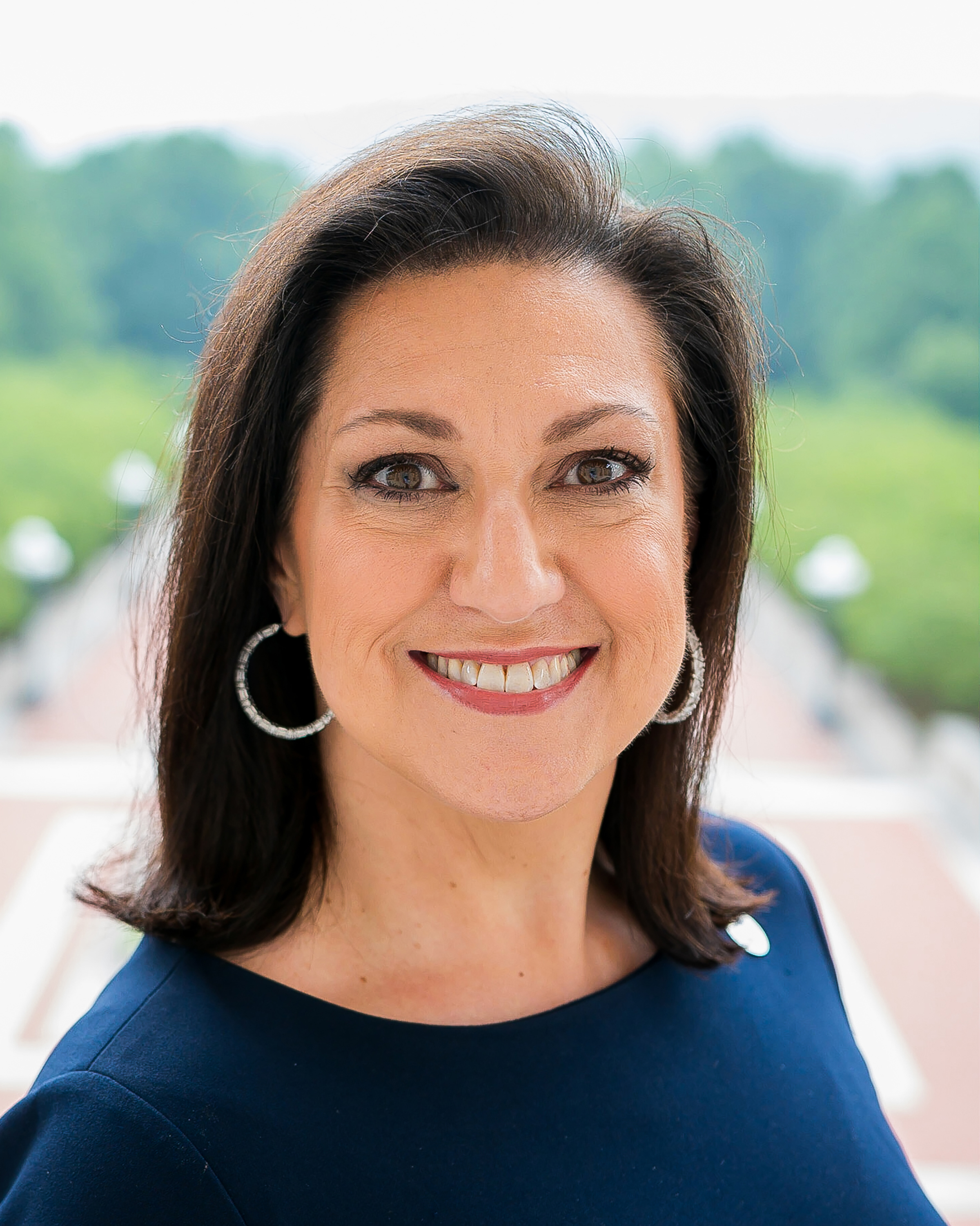
- Stevenson in 2023

Member of the Kentucky House of Representatives from the 88th district
- In office January 1, 2019 – January 1, 2025
- Preceded by: Robert Benvenuti
- Succeeded by: Vanessa Grossl

Personal details
- Born: Cherlynn Watley Stevenson; July 17, 1976 (age 50) Hindman, Kentucky, US
- Party: Democratic
- Education: Morehead State University (BS)
- Occupation: Politician, businesswoman
- Website: Campaign website

Cherlynn Watley Stevenson (born July 17, 1976) is an American politician and businesswoman. A Democrat, she was a member in the Kentucky House of Representatives, representing the 88th district from 2019 to 2025. Her district comprised parts of Fayette and Scott counties.

On May 13, 2025, Stevenson declared her candidacy for Kentucky's 6th congressional district in the 2026 United States House of Representatives elections, which is being vacated by incumbent U.S. Representative Andy Barr, who is running for senator.

== Biography ==
Stevenson was born on July 17, 1975, in Hindman, Kentucky, the daughter of a schoolteacher and a coal miner. She graduated from Morehead State University with a bachelor of science in behavioral sciences.

Before entering politics, Stevenson was a small business owner, and previously worked in healthcare and manufacturing. She was also an event planner.

Stevenson was a Democrat. She was a member of the kentucky House of Representatives, from January 1, 2019, to January 1, 2025, representing the 88th district. During her time in the House, she served as Democratic Minority Caucus Chair. she lost her re-election to Vanessa Grossl, by a margin of 125 votes.

On May 13, 2025, Stevenson announced her candidacy for Kentucky's 6th congressional district in the 2026 U.S. House of Representatives elections, the seat is being vacated by Republican incumbent Andy Barr, who ran for the United States Senate. The district was last held by a Democrat in 2010, with Ben Chandler, though was believed to be flippable. Zach Dembo ended up winning the election.

Stevenson is Christian.
