= Kentucky Party =

Political party in the US State of Kentucky

The Kentucky Party is a political party in the United States that operates only in Kentucky. Founded in 2024, the party initially formed to secure ballot access for Green Party presidential candidate Jill Stein in the 2024 United States presidential election. It subsequently continued as a political organization and fielded candidates for local, state, and federal office in the 2026 elections.

The party's platform focuses on anti-war politics, calls for political transparency, and advocates for changes to Kentucky's political and economic system.

== History ==
=== Formation and 2024 presidential election ===
The Kentucky Party was established in 2024 by a group of Kentucky voters seeking to create a new political organization independent of the Democratic and Republican parties. The organization submitted petitions to place Green Party presidential nominee Jill Stein on the Kentucky ballot after the state's own inactive Green Party lacked ballot access. The petition effort required 5,000 signatures from Kentucky voters. Jill Stein subsequently appeared on the November 2024 ballot under the Kentucky Party designation, with Samson LeBeau Kpadenou as her vice-presidential running mate.

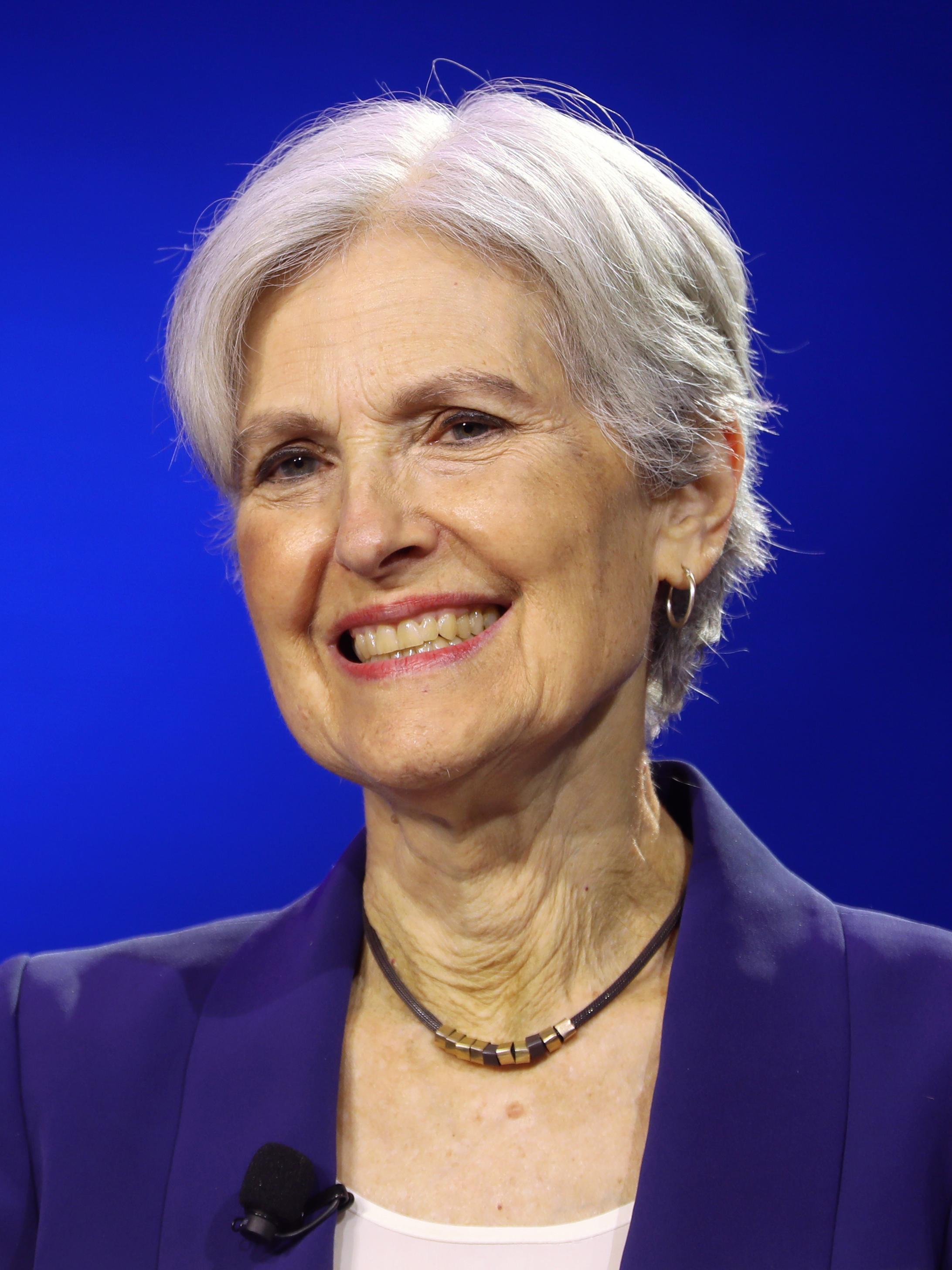
Jill Stein in 2024.

Stein received 7,566 votes, or approximately 0.36 percent of the statewide vote.

=== Development after 2024 ===
The party's activities after the 2024 election marked a shift from its initial role in securing ballot access for Stein toward an ongoing organization seeking to field candidates under the Kentucky Party designation. In 2025, the party held a statewide convention and described its purpose as providing an electoral organization centered on Kentucky and opposition to war and political corruption.

The party subsequently began recruiting candidates for federal, state, and local offices for 2026 elections. Its stated strategy emphasized recruiting independent candidates and securing ballot access rather than requiring all candidates to adopt an extensive common policy platform.

The Kentucky State Board of Elections began including the Kentucky Party among the political organizations whose voter registration totals it tracks. The administrative regulation began listing the Kentucky Party alongside the Constitution, Green, Libertarian, Reform, and Socialist Workers parties for purposes of voter-registration tracking. As of August 2026, the Kentucky State Board of Elections reported 305 voters under the Kentucky Party designation.

=== 2026 elections ===
The Kentucky Party nominated candidates in several federal and state races in the 2026 election. Christopher Campbell filed as the party's candidate for the 2026 United States Senate election in Kentucky. Pete Lynch filed as the Kentucky Party candidate in Kentucky's 6th congressional district, while Palestinian-American activist Mohammad Wael Ahmad filed as the party's candidate in Kentucky's 4th congressional district. Geoffrey M. Young filed as the party's candidate for the Kentucky House of Representatives in the 75th district.

Ahmad subsequently withdrew from the race in August.

The Kentucky Party's candidates also attracted coverage in state political media. Lynch, a political science lecturer at the University of Kentucky, has published opinion pieces in the Herald-Leader on issues such as campaign-finance reform and economic populism. He has also appeared at local forums on data centers, raising concerns on local impact and input.

Campbell participated in the 146th St. Jerome Church Picnic, an annual political event in Fancy Farm, Kentucky, alongside the Democratic and Republican nominees for U.S. Senate. Kentucky Educational Television published a recording of his speech as part of its coverage of the August 1, 2026, event.

In the U.S. Senate race, Christopher Campbell ran as the Kentucky Party candidate against Republican Andy Barr and Democrat Charles Booker. Campbell received 29,892 votes (approximately 2.09% of the total vote), with Barr winning the seat.

In the 6th Congressional District, Pete Lynch represented the Kentucky Party in a race against Democrat Zach Dembo, Republican Ralph Alvarado, and Independent Jay J. Bowman. Lynch received 3,836 votes (approximately 1.55% of the total vote) in the election won by Dembo.

Geoffrey M. Young represented the party in the Kentucky House of Representatives 75th District general election against Democratic incumbent Lindsey Burke and Republican Jeff Forsyth, receiving 505 votes (approximately 4.1% of the total vote) in the race won by Burke.

== Organization ==
The Kentucky Party operates as a statewide political organization in Kentucky. The Federal Election Commission lists the Kentucky Party as an active quarterly 'Party – Nonqualified' political committee and identifies Geoffrey M. Young as its treasurer.

The party has also maintained a statewide convention and an organizational structure for recruiting candidates and conducting elections. Its organizational materials identify ballot access and candidate recruitment as central functions of the party.

== See also ==
- Political party strength in Kentucky
- Jill Stein 2024 presidential campaign
- Third party (U.S. politics)
