= Ralph Alvarado =

American physician and politician

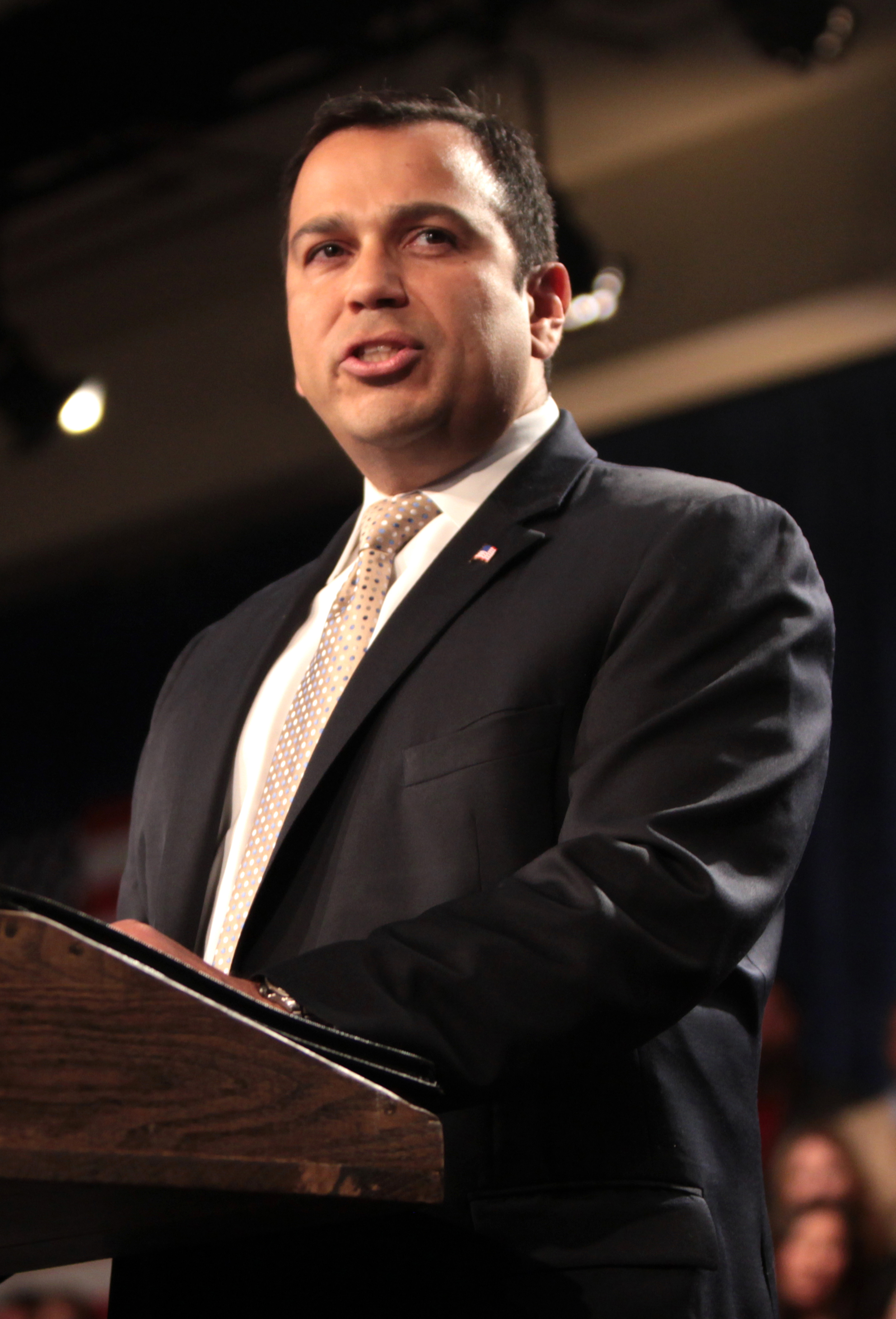
- Alvarado in 2015

15th Commissioner of the Tennessee Department of Health
- In office January 16, 2023 – July 11, 2025
- Governor: Bill Lee
- Preceded by: Morgan McDonald (acting)
- Succeeded by: John Dunn (acting)

Member of the Kentucky Senate from the 28th district
- In office January 1, 2015 – January 6, 2023
- Preceded by: R. J. Palmer
- Succeeded by: Greg Elkins

Personal details
- Born: April 30, 1970 (age 56) San Francisco, California, U.S.
- Party: Republican
- Education: Loma Linda University (BS, MD)
- Website: Campaign website

Ralph A. Alvarado (born April 30, 1970) is an American physician and politician who most recently served as the 15th Commissioner of the Tennessee Department of Health from 2023 until his resignation in 2025. He previously served as a member of the Kentucky Senate, representing Kentucky's 28th Senate district from 2015 to 2023.

Alvarado ran for the U.S. House of Representatives in Kentucky's 6th congressional district in the 2026 election, losing to Democratic nominee Zach Dembo.

== Early life and education ==
Alvarado was born April 30, 1970, in San Francisco, California, and raised in Pacifica and San Jose, California. His father is from Costa Rica and his mother is from Argentina.

He graduated from Bellarmine College Preparatory in San Jose in 1988. In 1990, Alvarado graduated from Loma Linda University in California with a Bachelor of Science degree in biology and completed an MD from the same university in 1994. He completed his residency at the University of Kentucky Albert B. Chandler hospital.

== Political career ==
=== Kentucky Senate ===
In 2014, Alvarado was elected to the Kentucky State Senate representing Kentucky's 28th Senate district. In 2016, he spoke at the Republican National Convention. In 2017, he sponsored a medical malpractice tort reform bill that was later struck down by the Kentucky Supreme Court for obstructing access to the courts.

=== 2019 gubernatorial election ===
Alvarado was chosen by Governor Matt Bevin to be his running mate in the 2019 Kentucky gubernatorial election. The Bevin-Alvarado ticket lost the general election on November 5, 2019, to the Democratic ticket of Andy Beshear and Jacqueline Coleman.

=== Commissioner of the Tennessee Department of Health ===
On November 22, 2022, Tennessee Governor Bill Lee announced that he had appointed Alvarado commissioner of the Tennessee Department of Health. Alvarado resigned from the Kentucky Senate on January 6, 2023, and became the 15th Commissioner of the Tennessee Department of Health on January 16, 2023. He served in this role until his resignation on July 11, 2025.

=== 2026 congressional campaign ===
On July 8, 2025, Alvarado revealed he was considering a run for Kentucky's 6th congressional district seat being vacated by incumbent Andy Barr, due to the latter's candidacy for the U.S. Senate seat held by the retiring Mitch McConnell. After resigning from his commissioner role on July 11, Alvarado announced his official entry into the 6th district Republican primary on July 17, 2025. He won the Republican nomination on May 19, 2026.

During the primary election, Alvarado campaigned as a "MAHA doctor" and emphasized his support of President Donald Trump. On May 1, 2026, he was endorsed by Trump as well as Speaker Mike Johnson. After the primary, he removed references to President Trump from the homepage of his campaign website and emphasized his "independent leadership".

In February 2026, Alvarado expressed support for the Iran war after the Assassination of Ali Khamenei. He has since called for an end to the war. On November 3, 2026, Alvarado lost the general election to Democrat Zach Dembo.

Party political offices
| Preceded by Jenean Hampton | Republican nominee for Lieutenant Governor of Kentucky; 2019 | Succeeded by Robby Mills |
