= Vanessa Grossl =

Kentucky politician (born 1980)

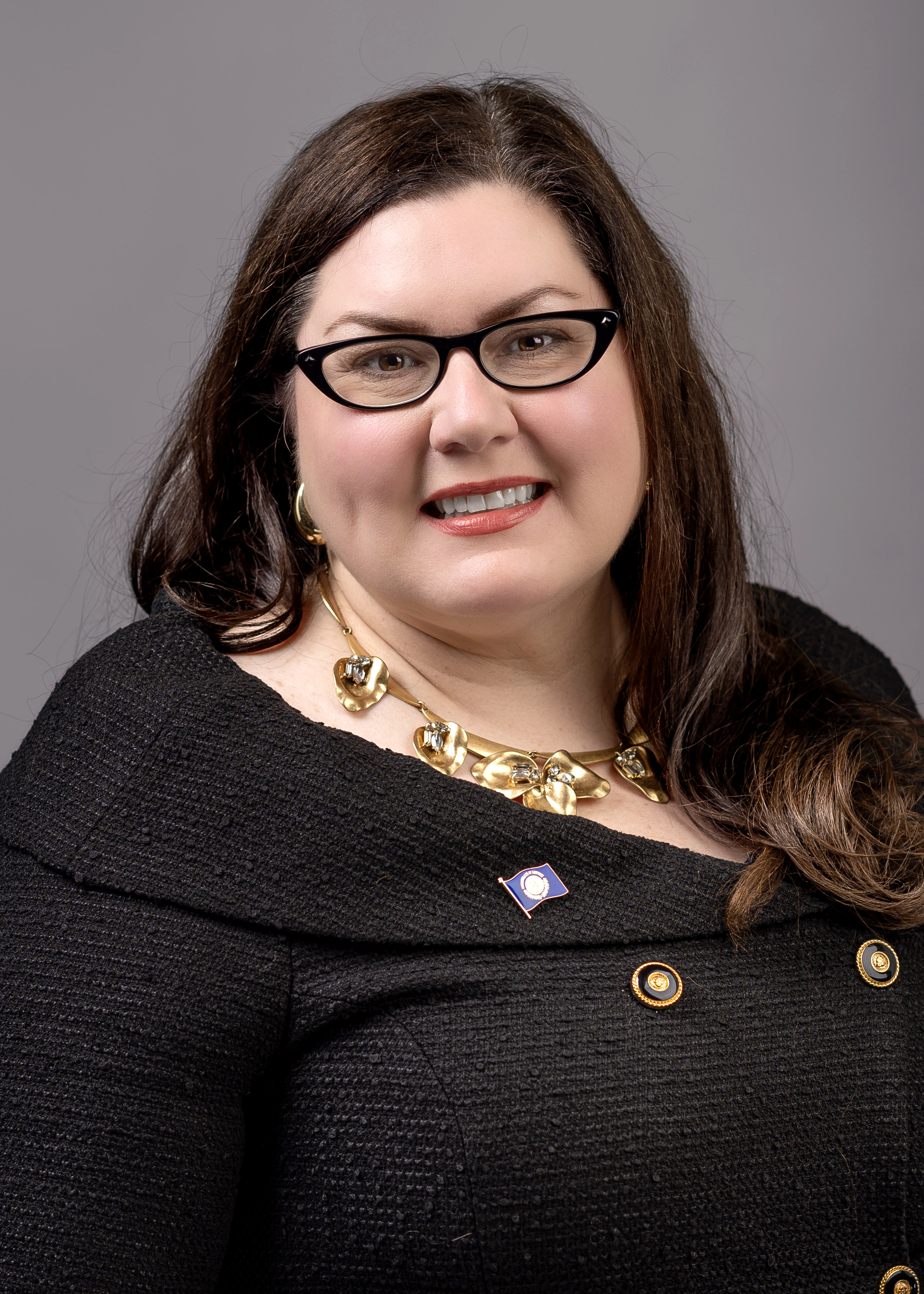

Member of the Kentucky House of Representatives from the 88th district
- Incumbent
- Assumed office January 1, 2025
- Preceded by: Cherlynn Stevenson

Personal details
- Born: February 22, 1980 (age 46)
- Party: Republican

Vanessa S. Grossl (born February 22, 1980) is an American politician who has served as a member of the Kentucky House of Representatives since January 2025. She represents the 88th district, which includes parts of Fayette and Scott Counties.

== Political career ==
Grossl was elected in the 2024 Kentucky House of Representatives election. She received 50.3 percent of the vote, defeating incumbent Democratic representative Cherlynn Stevenson for reelection. On March 12, 2026, Grossl became the first sitting Republican legislator in Kentucky to speak at a Planned Parenthood rally.

== Electoral history ==
=== 2024 ===
2024 Kentucky House of Representatives 88th district election
Party	Candidate	Votes	%
Republican	Vanessa Grossl	11,722	50.3
Democratic	Cherlynn Stevenson (incumbent)	11,597	49.7
Total votes		23,319	100.0
Republican gain from Democratic			

Kentucky House of Representatives
Preceded by Cherlynn Stevenson	Member of the Kentucky House of Representatives from the 88th district 2025–present	Succeeded by incumbent
