= Tennessee Department of Health =

Government organization in Tennessee, United States

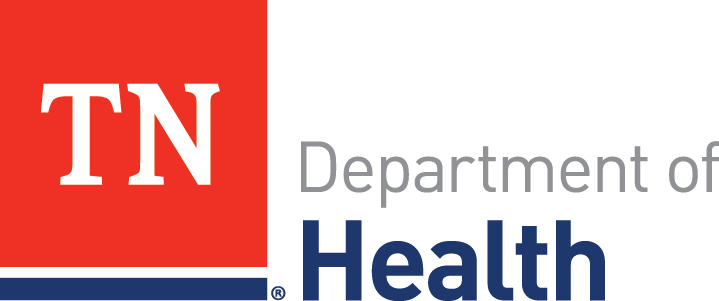

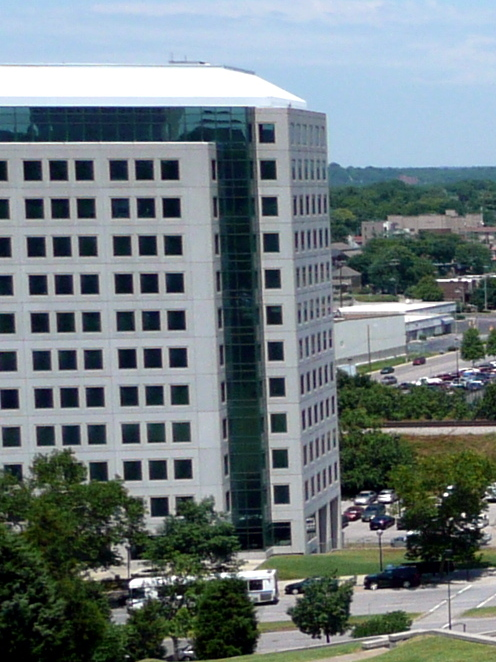
- TDH is headquartered in the Andrew Johnson Tower in Nashville

Agency overview
- Jurisdiction: State of Tennessee
- Headquarters: 710 James Robertson Parkway; Nashville, Tennessee
- Employees: 3,400
- Agency executive: John R. Dunn, Interim Commissioner
- Website: www.tn.gov/health, History

The Tennessee Department of Health (TDH) is the primary agency of state government in Tennessee responsible for public health. Its workforce provides a variety of direct and indirect services to residents and visitors in all 95 counties of the state.

== Purpose ==
In 2014, some 1.4 million of Tennessee's 6.6 million people received direct services in the 89 rural county health departments or the six metropolitan county health departments. Each year the department, in collaboration with many communities, creates a state health plan to help provide direction for the department.

== Organization ==
The Commissioner of the Tennessee Department of Health is appointed by the Governor and oversees an enterprise affecting population health across the state. The commissioner, in turn, has an executive leadership team reporting directly to him that manages various areas or responsibilities within the department. The department has had 15 Commissioners since its creation in 1923. The current Interim Commissioner is John R. Dunn who has served since his appointment in July 2025.

The Tennessee Department of Health has seven regional offices located across Tennessee; each of these is responsible for assisting county health departments within their jurisdiction. The TDH commissioner is responsible for appointing both regional and county directors.

There are six metro health departments in Tennessee, located in the following counties: Davidson, Hamilton, Knox, Madison, Shelby, and Sullivan. Though not under the direct supervision of the commissioner of the Tennessee Department of Health, metro health department directors and staff members work collaboratively with TDH regional and TDH central office staff on a variety of public health services and functions. By statute, the Commissioner, in consultation with county mayors, appoints each new county director including metros. By tradition, metro health departments are engaged directly in day-to-day pre-decisional tactical operations through the Health Systems Council structure. The metro health departments serve approximately 40 percent of Tennesseans and are another source of population health innovations that are often identified as best practices and adopted by their rural counterparts statewide.

In both rural and metro areas, a county board of health, whose members are appointed under their local form of governance and serve varying term lengths without financial compensation, provide oversight of their county's public health department. County boards of health typically include at least one medical doctor. Each county also has a separate and distinct county health council. These positions are also appointed and uncompensated.

Metro and rural county health departments routinely engage with the Tennessee Emergency Management Agency in preparedness exercises for both natural and man-made disasters that may affect population health.

The Tennessee Department of Health provides staff members for the 24 Health Professional Boards, three committees, two councils and four registries responsible for the licensure and regulation of more than three dozen health and medical professions in Tennessee. Approximately 260,000 individuals are licensed and regulated by the boards. Board members are appointed by the Governor. Tennessee has had a licensing board for health professionals since 1947. Additionally, the Tennessee Office of Health Care Facilities licenses 14 different types of facilities. Currently, more 2,400 facilities are inspected.

The Tennessee Department of Health maintains a free online information portal for anyone to review licensure status of health and medical professionals:

https://apps.health.tn.gov/Licensure/default.aspx

There is also a free online information portal to review status of licensed health-related facilities in Tennessee: https://apps.health.tn.gov/FacilityInspections/

== County Health Departments ==
Tennessee's network of county health departments assures all residents have access to a variety of local health services intended to maintain or improve health. Services include wellchild exams, fluoride varnish applications, immunizations, family planning, control of sexually transmitted diseases, nutrition counseling, the Women, Infants and Children program, children's special services, prenatal care, the Help Us Grow Successfully (HUGS) program, Vital Records, Environmental Health Inspection programs and others. In some county health departments, medical staff members are available for diagnosing and treating acute and chronic illnesses; some also provide dental care.

County health departments can also assist with those wanting certificates of births and deaths that occur in Tennessee. Records Vital Records pertaining to deaths and marriages are available from the TDH central office in Nashville. For information about genealogy, researchers may also find information at the Tennessee State Library and Archives.

== Environmental Health ==
The Tennessee Department of Health and local county health departments regulate and inspect many locations and establishments. In the case of food, the department partners with the Tennessee Department of Agriculture in licensing and regulating providers. The Tennessee Department of Agriculture (TDA) is responsible for those food service providers that are physically a part of another retail establishment, such as a gas station or convenience store. Establishments, operations and services licensed and regulated by the Tennessee Department of Health include food service providers that are ‘free-standing’ and not associated with other retail operations; hotels, motels and camps; public swimming pools, spas, hot tubs and camps; body art facilities; correctional facilities; and more.

The department maintains efforts to prevent the spread of vector-borne and zoonotic diseases. Tennessee is home to a number of insects or arthropods that are known carriers of disease. Illnesses such as West Nile Virus, La Cross Encephalitis and Rocky Mountain Spotted Fever, though rare, do occur in the state. Rabies, once a scourge in the state, is exceptionally rare thanks to effective vaccination programs for animals and heightened awareness in humans. The Tennessee Department of Environment of Conservation, once a part of TDH, has been a separate department since 1992, providing a range of environment protection services.

== Laboratory Services ==
TDH Laboratory Services provide analytical services of medical and environmental testing at its facilities in Nashville and Knoxville.
