= Zach Dembo =

American politician (born 1985)

Member-elect of the U.S. House of Representatives from Kentucky's 6th district
- Assuming office January 3, 2027
- Succeeding: Andy Barr

Personal details
- Born: December 3, 1985 (age 40)
- Party: Democratic
- Education: Stanford University (BA); University of Michigan (JD)

Zachary David Dembo (born December 3, 1985) is an American politician who is the U.S. representative-elect for Kentucky's 6th congressional district.

== Early life and education ==
Dembo was born December 3, 1985, and raised in Lexington. His mother is from Finchville, Kentucky, and comes from seven generations of Kentucky farmers. His father grew up on Long Island and moved to Kentucky to teach at the University of Kentucky.

He graduated from Stanford University in 2007 with a Bachelor of Arts in History. After college, Dembo moved to the Mississippi Delta as a corps member in the Teach For America program, where he taught 8th grade English in Greenville, Mississippi, from 2007 to 2009.

After Teach For America, Dembo enrolled in the University of Michigan Law School and received his Juris Doctor in 2012. He then commissioned into the Navy as an officer in the United States Navy Judge Advocate General's Corps, where he handled a wide array of legal tasks, including helping sailors and Marines, for five years.

== Legal career ==
After receiving his honorable discharge from active duty, Dembo became a federal prosecutor at the Department of Justice in 2017, serving as a line prosecutor in the Civil Rights Division under the first Trump Administration. This is where he met his wife, Lindsey Dembo Studebaker, who is also a lawyer. He served in that position until March 2020, when he accepted a position as Kentucky Governor Andy Beshear's Policy Advisor and was then promoted to Legislative Director in 2021. He then returned to federal law enforcement as a prosecutor in the United States District Court for the Eastern District of Kentucky.

Between 2016 and 2025, he prosecuted at least 38 criminal defendants at trial, including drug trafficking, rape, kidnapping, immigration offenses, constitutional rights crimes and hate crimes, with the cases he was assigned resulting in 35 convictions and three acquittals.

Dembo says he resigned from 11 years of federal service after witnessing what he described as "the corruption and politicization of the Department of Justice."

== U.S. House of Representatives ==
=== 2026 congressional campaign ===
Dembo ran for the United States House of Representatives for Kentucky's 6th congressional district in the 2026 elections. Endorsed by the moderate Blue Dog PAC, he defeated Republican nominee Ralph Alvarado.

Dembo announced his entry into the 6th district Democratic primary on July 17, 2025. A first time candidate, Dembo won the Democratic nomination on May 19, 2026, carrying 15 of the 16 counties in the district.

Dembo with Barr, 2026

Dembo campaigned as a public servant tackling the cost of corruption he saw as a federal prosecutor in the Department of Justice before he resigned. He put out a 10-point anti-corruption plan. In late April through late-May, he was endorsed by the National Education Association, former Lexington mayor Jim Gray, the last Democrat to represent the seat Ben Chandler, and Governor Andy Beshear, among others. In particular, Beshear took an active role in the campaign and worked closely with Dembo to flip the seat.

=== Tenure ===
Dembo will assume office on January 3, 2027.

== Political positions ==
Dembo labels himself as a "Blue Dog Democrat". He was endorsed by Blue Dog PAC and he posted on social media that he is excited to be part of the Blue Dogs after the Blue Dog Coalition welcomed incoming members for the 120th Congress.

U.S. House of Representatives
Preceded by Andy Barr	Member of the U.S. House of Representatives from Kentucky's 6th congressional district Taking office 2027	Elect
