= Fwends =

- Australian film poster
- Directed by: Sophie Somerville
- Produced by: Sarah Hegge-Taylor, Carter Looker, Sophie Somerville
- Starring: Emmanuelle Mattana; Melissa Gan
- Cinematography: Carter Looker
- Edited by: Sophie Somerville
- Release dates: 15 February 2025 (Berlin International Film Festival); 7 June 2025 (Australia)
- Running time: 92 minutes
- Country: Australia
- Language: English

Fwends is a 2025 film directed by Sophie Somerville, shot on location in Melbourne, Australia. It stars Emmanuelle Mattana and Melissa Gan as two friends, Em and Jessie, who reunite for the first time in years one Christmas season and spend a weekend bonding and coming to terms with the ways in which they have changed. Somerville stated she wished to make "a portrait of relatable female angst that finds joy, wonder and a glimmer of madness along the way" and was inspired by My Dinner with Andre. There was a treatment but no script; the dialogue was entirely improvised.

Fwends premiered at the Berlin International Film Festival, where it won the Innovation Award.

== Plot ==
One year during the Christmas season, Em leaves Sydney on a spontaneous weekend trip to Melbourne to see Jessie, an old friend she has not seen for a long time. Jessie tries to show her around the city but finds that Em is constantly talking about herself, her career in law and her climate anxiety. Em also reveals that the trip was motivated by a recent incident in which she was sexually harassed at work, and Jessie that she has recently experienced a breakup. They return to Jessie's apartment in Fitzroy, where a late night silly conversation with a novelty karaoke microphone turns into a heated argument about science which forces them to confront the ways in which they have changed. They go out for dinner, then find themselves locked out of Jessie's apartment and are forced to spend the rest of the night on the streets. Jessie contacts a drug dealer and obtains MDMA, which they both take. The two bond throughout the night as they run through the streets. Jessie also reveals that her cheating led to her recent breakup and a fallout from her entire social circle. They make it back into the apartment after sunrise via the building's garage door and immediately crash on the couch. As Jessie falls asleep on her lap, Em reads a passage aloud from Bill McKibben's Falter: Has the Human Game Begun to Play Itself Out? The film ends as the two part ways at Southern Cross Station, leaving it ambiguous whether they will ever see each other again.

== Cast ==
- Emmanuelle Mattana as Em
- Melissa Gan as Jessie
