= Falter: Has the Human Game Begun to Play Itself Out? =

2019 non-fiction book by Bill McKibben

Falter
- Author: Bill McKibben
- Language: English
- Subjects: Climate change, global catastrophic risk
- Genre: Nonfiction, Opinion
- Publication date: 2019-04-16
- Publication place: United States

Falter: Has the Human Game Begun to Play Itself Out? is a 2019 book by American author Bill McKibben. He argues that the human game is risking playing itself out because of "leverage", or the scale of change to the planet that humans are causing. The book is largely about climate change, but also includes some discussion of unregulated artificial intelligence and bioengineering, two other modern developments that in the author's view pose significant risks to humanity. The book received mostly positive reviews.

== Background ==
In a 2019 interview with Murtaza Hussain of The Intercept, McKibben claimed that at merely one degree Celsius of warming above pre-industrial levels, "[it] is already becoming difficult to live in large parts of the planet. On our current trajectory, we are headed for 3 or 4 degrees of warming. At that level, we simply won't have a civilization like we do now."

With regards to the solutions, McKibben argued in 2019, "We have already made efforts at fossil fuel divestment and halting the construction of pipelines, but the next crucial area is finance: focusing on the banks and asset managers that give [those in the fossil fuel industry] the money to do what they do."

== Synopsis ==
Falter is divided into four sections: "The Size of the Board", "Leverage", "The Name of the Game", and "An Outside Chance".

The beginning of Falter explains the growing consequences of a changing climate. In detail, Bill McKibben explains how environmental factors such as pollution and ocean acidity are contributing to a decrease in the quality of human and natural life.

The book then describes concerns about economic policy and political ideology. Specifically, Falter references numerous individuals who are involved with the oil industry in the U.S. Falter contains numerous references to Exxon, which is contributing to the climate emergency through oil exploitation. Criticism of right-wing politics and blame of the Koch Brothers and Donald Trump is prevalent, explaining how conservatism and libertarianism contribute to the climate epidemic.

In the ending of Falter McKibben transitions from the warnings of rapid human innovation, then provides reasons for hope, such as renewable energy advances (especially solar panels) and climate activism.

== Reception ==
The book was praised by Elizabeth Kolbert and Naomi Klein. One review criticizes the book for its reliance on journalistic sources. The Washington Post called Falter one of the ten best books of 2019.

== In popular culture ==
The book was featured in the 2025 Australian film Fwends, about two friends who reunite after many years apart and come to terms with how they have changed. The character of Em is suffering from climate anxiety and has been reading Falter. In a key scene, she reads a long passage from it aloud.
