= Bill McKibben =

American environmentalist and writer (born 1960)

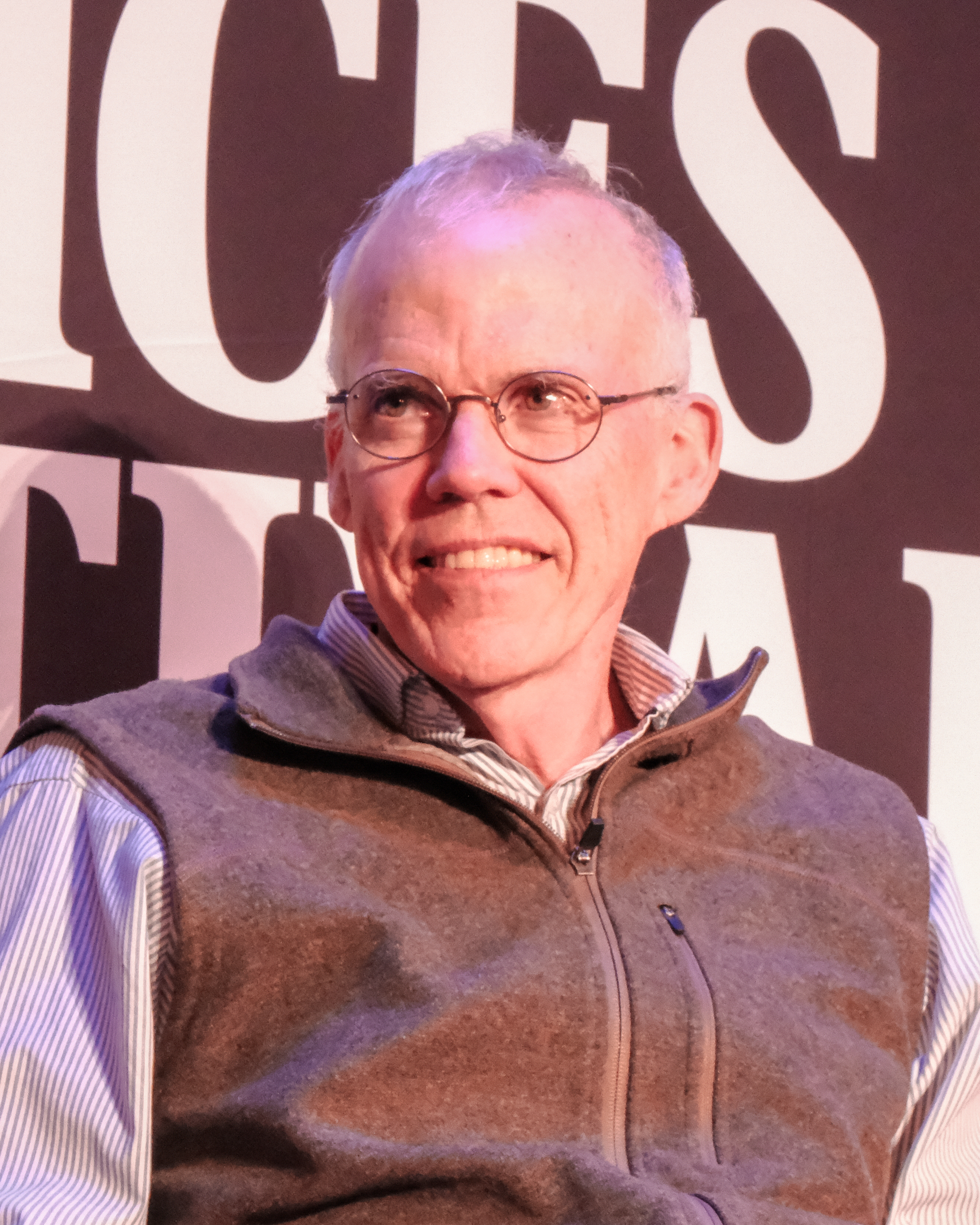
- McKibben in 2026
- Born: William Ernest McKibben; December 8, 1960 (age 65); Palo Alto, California, U.S.
- Education: Harvard University (BA)
- Spouse: Sue Halpern
- Children: 1
- Writing career
- Notable awards: Gandhi Peace Award; Right Livelihood Award
- Website: Official website

William Ernest McKibben (born December 8, 1960) is an American environmentalist, author, and journalist who has written extensively on the impact of global warming. He is the Schumann Distinguished Scholar of environmental studies at Middlebury College and leader of the climate campaign groups 350.org and the Third Act Movement. He has authored a dozen books about the environment, including his first, The End of Nature (1989), about climate change, Falter: Has the Human Game Begun to Play Itself Out? (2019), and Here Comes the Sun (2025) about the state of the environmental challenges facing humanity and future prospects.

In 2009, he led 350.org's organization of 5,200 simultaneous demonstrations in 181 countries. In 2010, McKibben and 350.org conceived the 10/10/10 Global Work Party, which convened more than 7,000 events in 188 countries, as he had told a large gathering at Warren Wilson College shortly before the event. In December 2010, 350.org coordinated a planet-scale art project, with many of the 20 works visible from satellites. In 2011 and 2012 he led the environmental campaign against the proposed Keystone XL pipeline project and spent three days in jail in Washington, D.C. Two weeks later he was inducted into the literature section of the American Academy of Arts and Sciences.

He was awarded the Gandhi Peace Award in 2013. Foreign Policy magazine named him to its inaugural list of the 100 most important global thinkers in 2009 and MSN named him one of the dozen most influential men of 2009. In 2010, The Boston Globe called him "probably the nation's leading environmentalist" and Time magazine book reviewer Bryan Walsh described him as "the world's best green journalist". In 2014, he was awarded the Right Livelihood Award for "mobilizing growing popular support in the USA and around the world for strong action to counter the threat of global climate change." In 2019, Aidan Smith, writing for Current Affairs, mentioned McKibben as a possible future Secretary of the Interior or Secretary of Energy in the cabinet of a hypothetical future progressive President.

== Early life ==
Bill McKibben was born in Palo Alto, California. His family later moved to Lexington, Massachusetts, where he attended high school. His father, who once, in 1971, had been arrested during a protest in support of Vietnam veterans against the war, wrote for Business Week, before becoming business editor at The Boston Globe, in 1980. As a high school student, McKibben wrote for the local paper and participated in statewide debate competitions. Entering Harvard College in 1978, he became an editor of The Harvard Crimson and was chosen president of the paper for the calendar year 1981.

In 1980, following the election of Ronald Reagan, he determined to dedicate his life to the environmental cause.

Graduating in 1982, he worked for five years for The New Yorker as a staff writer, writing much of the Talk of the Town column from 1982 to early 1987. Inspired by the Gospel of Matthew, he became an advocate of nonviolent resistance. While doing a story on the homeless, he lived on the streets; there, he met his wife, Sue Halpern, who was working as a homeless advocate. In 1987, McKibben quit The New Yorker after longtime editor William Shawn was forced out of his job. He and his family shortly after moved to a remote spot in the Southeastern Adirondacks of upstate New York, where he began to work as a freelance writer.

== Writing ==
McKibben began his freelance writing career at about the same time that climate change appeared on the public agenda following the hot summer and fires of 1988 and testimony by James Hansen before the United States Senate Committee on Energy and Natural Resources in June of that year. His first contribution to the debate was a brief list of literature on the subject and commentary published December 1988 in The New York Review of Books and a question, "Is the World Getting Hotter?"

He became and remains a frequent contributor to various publications, including The New York Times, The Atlantic, Harper's, Orion, Mother Jones, The American Prospect, The New York Review of Books, Granta, National Geographic, Rolling Stone, Adbusters, and Outside. He is also a board member at and contributor to Grist.

His first book, The End of Nature, was published in 1989 by Random House after being serialized in The New Yorker. Described by Ray Murphy of the Boston Globe as a "righteous jeremiad", the book excited much critical comment, pro and con; was for many people their first introduction to the question of climate change; and the inspiration for a great deal of writing and publishing by others. It has been printed in more than 20 languages. Several editions have come out in the United States, including an updated version published in 2006.

In 1992, The Age of Missing Information was published. It is an account of an experiment in which McKibben collected everything that came across the 100 channels of cable TV on the Fairfax, Virginia, system (at the time among the nation's largest) for a single day. He spent a year watching the 2,400 hours of programming, and then compared it to a day spent on the mountaintop near his home. This book has been widely used in colleges and high schools and was reissued in a new edition in 2006.

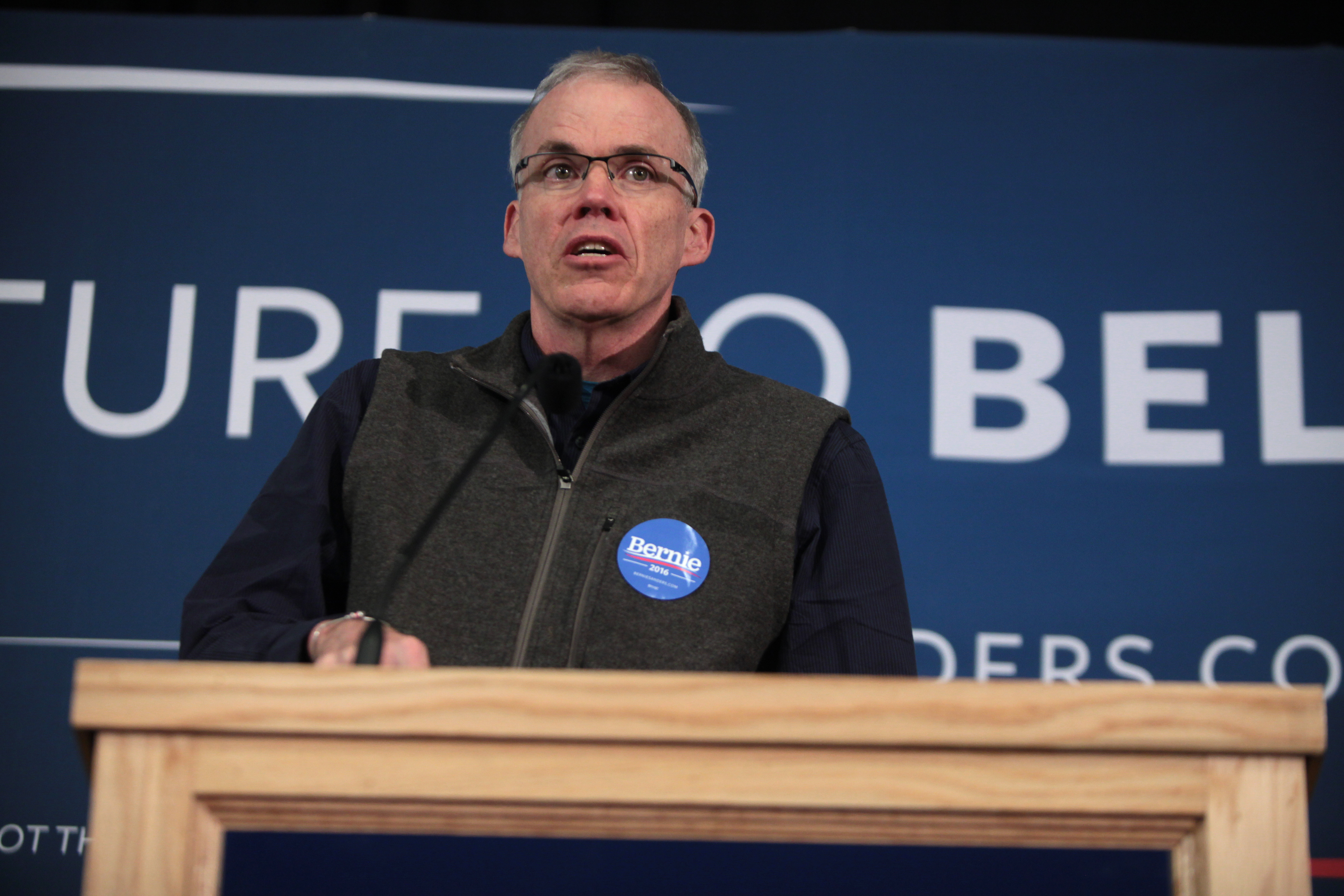
McKibben speaking at a Bernie Sanders campaign rally at Southern New Hampshire University in January 2016

Subsequent books include Hope, Human and Wild, about Curitiba, Brazil, and Kerala, India, which he cites as examples of people living more lightly on the earth; The Comforting Whirlwind: God, Job, and the Scale of Creation, which is about the Book of Job and the environment; Maybe One, about human population; Long Distance: A Year of Living Strenuously, about a year spent training for endurance events at an elite level; and Enough, about what he sees as the existential dangers of genetic engineering and nanotechnology. Speaking about Long Distance at the Cambridge Forum, McKibben cited the work of Mihaly Csikszentmihalyi and Csikszentmihalyi's idea of "flow" relative to feelings McKibben had had—"taking a break from saving the world", he joked—as he immersed himself in cross-country skiing competitions.

Wandering Home is about a long solo hiking trip from his home in the mountains east of Lake Champlain in Ripton, Vermont, back to his longtime neighborhood in the Adirondacks. His book Deep Economy: the Wealth of Communities and the Durable Future, published in March 2007, was a national bestseller. It addresses what he sees as shortcomings of the growth economy and envisions a transition to more local-scale enterprise.

In fall 2007, he published, with members of his Step It Up team, Fight Global Warming Now, a handbook for activists trying to organize their local communities. In 2008, came The Bill McKibben Reader: Pieces from an Active Life, a collection of essays spanning his career. Also in 2008, he edited for Library of America the anthology, American Earth: Environmental Writing Since Thoreau. In 2010, he published another national bestseller, Eaarth: Making a Life on a Tough New Planet, an account of the rapid onset of climate change. It was excerpted in Scientific American.

In 2019, McKibben published Falter: Has the Human Game Begun to Play Itself Out?, which details the growing concerns over climate change, how the Koch Brothers are contributing to an increase in carbon emissions by funding oil companies, and his concern with libertarianism, which he argues was sparked by the politics of the Reagan Revolution. He frequently argues that the Nordic model is preferable to a deregulated capitalist system, and that rapid innovation may come to hurt humanity.

In 2022, he published two books. We Are Better Together is a picture book for children celebrating the power of human cooperation and the beauty of life on Earth, illustrated by artist Stevie Lewis. The Flag, the Cross, and the Station Wagon: A Graying American Looks Back at His Suburban Boyhood and Wonders What the Hell Happened is a personal memoir that also digs into America's history to reflect on what has brought us to the present environmental crisis.

Some of McKibben's work has been extremely popular; an article in Rolling Stone in July 2012 received over 125,000 likes on Facebook, 14,000 tweets, and 5,000 comments.

McKibben was the guest editor of the 2024 edition of The Best American Science and Nature Writing anthology.

His book, "Here Comes The Sun," was published in 2025. The book's theme is that renewable energy prices are falling rapidly, and, as the title suggests, so are solar prices. The book is named after the Beatles' song, "Here Comes the Sun." In that book, he writes in the introduction: "We are on the verge of turning to the heavens for energy instead of to hell."

== Environmental campaigns ==
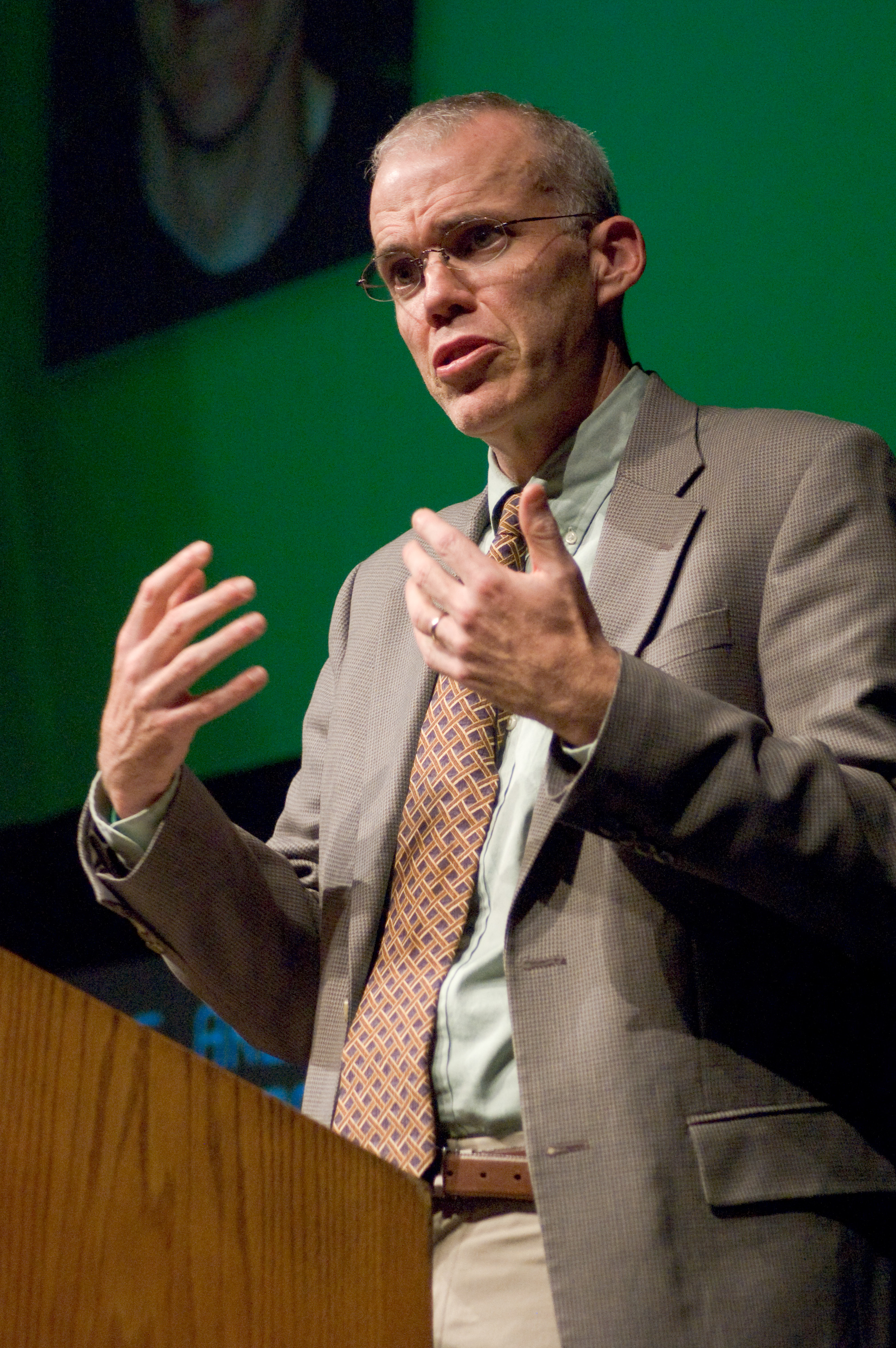
McKibben speaking at Rochester Institute of Technology, November 6, 2008

=== Step It Up ===
Step It Up 2007 was a nationwide environmental campaign, organized by McKibben, to demand action on global warming by the U.S. Congress.

In late summer 2006 he helped lead a five-day walk across Vermont to call for action on global warming. Beginning in January 2007, he founded Step It Up 2007, which organized rallies in hundreds of American cities and towns on April 14, 2007, to demand that Congress enact curbs on carbon emissions by 80 percent by 2050. The campaign quickly won widespread support from a wide variety of environmental, student, and religious groups.

In August 2007, McKibben announced Step It Up 2, to take place November 3, 2007. In addition to the 80% by 2050 slogan from the first campaign, the second adds "10% [reduction of emissions] in three years ("Hit the Ground Running"), a moratorium on new coal-fired power plants, and a Green Jobs Corps to help fix homes and businesses so those targets can be met" (called "Green Jobs Now, and No New Coal").

=== 350.org ===
In the wake of Step It Up's achievements, the same team announced a new campaign in March 2008 called 350.org. The organizing effort, aimed at the entire globe, drew its name from climate scientist James E. Hansen's contention earlier that winter that any atmospheric concentration of carbon dioxide (CO_{2}) above 350 parts per million was unsafe. "If humanity wishes to preserve a planet similar to that on which civilization developed and to which life on Earth is adapted, paleoclimate evidence and ongoing climate change suggest that CO_{2} will need to be reduced from its current 385 ppm to at most 350 ppm, but likely less than that." Hansen et al. stated in the Abstract to their paper.

350.org, which has offices and organizers in North America, Europe, Asia, Africa and South America, attempted to spread that 350 number in advance of international climate meetings in December 2009 in Copenhagen. It was widely covered in the media. On October 24, 2009, it coordinated more than 5,200 demonstrations in 181 countries, and was widely lauded for its creative use of internet tools, with the website Critical Mass declaring that it was "one of the strongest examples of social media optimization the world has ever seen." Foreign Policy magazine called it "the largest ever global coordinated rally of any kind."

Subsequently, the organization continued its work, with the Global Work Party on 10/10/10 (10 October 2010). As of 2022, McKibben is a senior advisor to 350.org and May Boeve is the executive director.

=== Keystone XL ===
McKibben is one of the environmentalists against the proposed Canadian-U.S. Keystone XL pipeline project.

=== People's Climate March ===
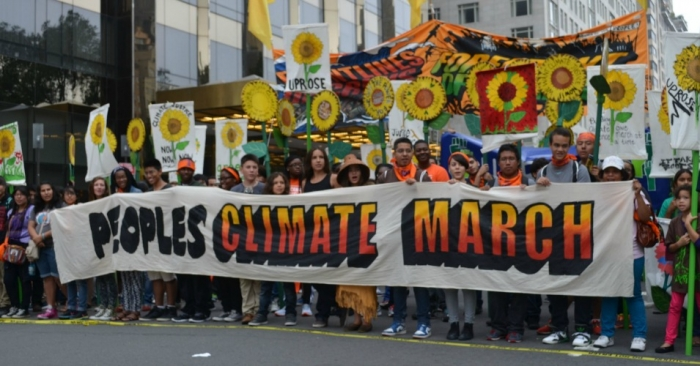
The People's Climate March 2014

On May 21, 2014, McKibben published an article on the website of Rolling Stone magazine (later appearing in the magazine's print issue of June 5) titled "A Call to Arms", which invited readers to a major climate march (later dubbed the People's Climate March) in New York City on the weekend of September 20–21, as part of the People's Climate Movement. (Note: Both dates were mentioned in the article because the actual date of the march was uncertain at the time of publication. After negotiations with New York City authorities, event planners chose Sunday, September 21 as the date.) In the article, McKibben calls climate change "the biggest crisis our civilization has ever faced", and predicts that the march will be "the largest demonstration yet of human resolve in the face of climate change".

On Sunday, July 5, 2015, McKibben led a similar climate march in Toronto, Ontario, with the support of various celebrities.

=== Third Act ===
In September 2021, McKibben launched Third Act, a group and campaign for climate change activists aged 60 or older, hoping to leverage the demographic's free time and accumulated assets for political pressure on government. Supporters like Bernie Sanders and Jane Fonda promoted the project.

=== Electoral politics ===
During the 2016 Democratic presidential primary campaigns, McKibben served as a political surrogate for Vermont Senator Bernie Sanders. Sanders appointed him to the committee charged with writing the Democratic Party's platform for 2016. After Sanders' defeat by Hillary Clinton, McKibben endorsed her and spoke at their first joint event in Portsmouth, New Hampshire. He has been mentioned as a potential future Cabinet member should Sanders win the presidency.

=== Keynotes ===
In 2020, McKibben delivered a keynote at 2020 Vision: Finding Hope in Climate Action.

=== Climate Words ===
In 2024, McKibben worked with Climate Words, a nonprofit that is dedicated to bridging gaps in climate communication and breaking down barriers to meaningful dialogue about climate justice, on the meaning behind the term 3.5%. According to McKibben, Harvard political scientist Erica Chenoweth found that if about 3.5% of people peacefully protest, they are likely to succeed in creating change. This small group, around 280 million people worldwide, can make a big difference, especially in fighting climate change.

TED Talk

In 2026, McKibben gave a speech at TED in favour of a global transition towards solar energy, referring primarily to its economic benefits to humanity globally.

== Views ==
In 2016, McKibben claimed in an opinion piece in The New York Times that he was "under surveillance" by people he characterized as "right-wing stalkers" who follow and photograph him and members of his family in search of ostensible instances of environmental hypocrisy. Two years later, McKibben claimed in the New York Times he had received occasional death threats since the 1990’s.

In December 2019, McKibben and 42 others signed a letter endorsing the British Labour Party under Jeremy Corbyn's leadership in the 2019 general election. The letter stated: "Labour's election manifesto under Jeremy Corbyn's leadership offers a transformative plan that prioritizes the needs of people and the planet over private profit and the vested interests of a few."

== Personal life ==
McKibben resides in Ripton, Vermont with his wife, writer Sue Halpern. Their only child, a daughter, was born in 1993 in Glens Falls, New York. He is a Schumann Distinguished Scholar at Middlebury College, where he also directs the Middlebury Fellowships in Environmental Journalism. McKibben is also a fellow at the Post Carbon Institute. He is a longtime Methodist.

Since 2013, McKibben has been listed on the Advisory Council of the National Center for Science Education.

In 2026, McKibben endorsed Avi Lewis in that year's federal NDP leadership race.

== Awards ==
- McKibben has been awarded both a Guggenheim Fellowship (1993) and a Lyndhurst Fellowship.
- He won a Lannan Literary Award for nonfiction writing in 2000.
- In 2010, Utne Reader magazine listed McKibben as one of the "25 Visionaries Who Are Changing Your World."
- He has honorary degrees from Whittier College (2010), Marlboro College, Colgate University, the State University of New York, Sterling College, Green Mountain College, Unity College, and Lebanon Valley College.
- He won the Puffin/Nation Prize for Creative Citizenship in 2010, for his work with 350.org
- McKibben was the recipient of the Sierra Club's highest honor in 2011, the John Muir Award.
- In 2012, he won the Sam Rose and Julie Walters Prize for Global Environmental Activism at Dickinson College; accepting the prize, he told the graduating Dickinson students that, in addition to be the greatest problem of their lives, global climate change is the greatest challenge that has ever confronted human society.
- In 2013, he won the international environment and development prize Sophie Prize.
- McKibben and 350.org were awarded the Right Livelihood Award in 2014 for mobilizing growing popular support in the United States and around the world for strong action to counter the threat of global climate change".
- In 2018, McKibben was awarded the John Steinbeck Award at San Jose State University.

== Bibliography ==
=== Books ===
- McKibben, Bill (1986). The End of Nature. New York: Random House.
- The Age of Missing Information (1992) ISBN 0-394-58933-5, challenges Marshall McLuhan's "global village" ideal and claims the standardization of life in electronic media is that of image and not substance, resulting in a loss of meaningful content in society
- Hope, Human and Wild: True Stories of Living Lightly on the Earth (1995) ISBN 0-316-56064-2
- Maybe One: A Personal and Environmental Argument for Single Child Families (1998) ISBN 0-684-85281-0
- Hundred Dollar Holiday (1998) ISBN 0-684-85595-X
- Long Distance: Testing the Limits of Body and Spirit in a Year of Living Strenuously (2001) ISBN 0-452-28270-5
- Enough: Staying Human in an Engineered Age (2003) ISBN 0-8050-7096-6
- Wandering Home (2005) ISBN 0-609-61073-2
- The Comforting Whirlwind: God, Job, and the Scale of Creation (2005) ISBN 1-56101-234-3
- Deep Economy: The Wealth of Communities and the Durable Future (2007) ISBN 0-8050-7626-3
  - Reviewed in Tim Flannery, "We're Living on Corn!" The New York Review of Books 54/11 (28 June 2007) : 26–28
- Fight Global Warming Now: The Handbook for Taking Action in Your Community (2007) ISBN 9780805087048
- The Bill McKibben Reader: Pieces from an Active Life (2008) ISBN 9780805076271
- American Earth: Environmental Writing Since Thoreau (edited) (2008) ISBN 9781598530209
- Eaarth: Making a Life on a Tough New Planet (2010) ISBN 978-0-8050-9056-7
- The Global Warming Reader (OR Books, 2011) ISBN 978-1-935928-36-2
- Oil and Honey: The Education of an Unlikely Activist (Times Books, 2013) ISBN 9780805092844
- Radio Free Vermont: A Fable of Resistance. (Blue Rider Press, 2017) ISBN 9780735219861, 9781524743727
- Falter: Has the Human Game Begun to Play Itself Out?. Description & arrow/scrollable preview. (Henry Holt and Co., 2019) ISBN 9781250178268
- We Are Better Together, (Henry Holt and Co., 2022) ISBN 9781250755155
- The Flag, the Cross, and the Station Wagon: A Graying American Looks Back at His Suburban Boyhood and Wonders What the Hell Happened (Henry Holt and Co., 2022) ISBN 9781250823601
- Here Comes the Sun: a Last Chance for the Climate and a Fresh Chance for Civilization (WW Norton, 2025) ISBN 978-1-324-10623-4 (Note: McKibbon, Bill (August 2025). Here comes the sun: a last chance for the climate and a fresh chance for civilization. New York, USA: WW Norton. ISBN 978-1-324-10623-4. Hardcover edition.)

=== Essays and reporting ===
- McKibben, Bill (January 7, 1985). "An American dilemma". The Talk of the Town. The New Yorker. 60 (47): 21. (Note: Renaming of Sixth Avenue in Manhattan as 'Avenue of the Americas'.)
- — (January 14, 1985). "Notes and comment". The Talk of the Town. The New Yorker. 60 (48): 23. (Note: Friend whose prior military rank was inadvertently promoted by Geraldine Ferraro.)
- — (January 21, 1985). "Flowers". The Talk of the Town. The New Yorker. 60 (48): 28. (Note: Textile designers Leslie Tillett and Brian Goodin.)
- — (January 28, 1985). "Up front". The Talk of the Town. The New Yorker. 60 (50): 22–23. (Note: Rolls-Royce grille designer Tony Kent.)
- — (October 13, 1986). "Commerce". The Talk of the Town. The New Yorker. 62 (34): 38–39.
- — (June 29, 2015). "Power to the people : why the rise of green energy makes utility companies nervous". Annals of Innovation. The New Yorker. 91 (18): 30–35. (Note: Title in the online table of contents is "Solar power for everyone".)
- — (August 15, 2016). "A World at War". The New Republic.
- — (March 18, 2022). "In A World on Fire, Stop Burning Things". The New Yorker.
- "Toward a Land of Buses and Bikes" (review of Ben Goldfarb, Crossings: How Road Ecology Is Shaping the Future of Our Planet, Norton, 2023, 370 pp.; and Henry Grabar, Paved Paradise: How Parking Explains the World, Penguin Press, 2023, 346 pp.), The New York Review of Books, vol. LXX, no. 15 (5 October 2023), pp. 30–32. "Someday in the not impossibly distant future, if we manage to prevent a global warming catastrophe, you could imagine a post-auto world where bikes and buses and trains are ever more important, as seems to be happening in Europe at the moment." (p. 32.)

———————

== Filmography ==
=== Broadcasts ===
- McKibben, Bill (June 18, 2010). "Point of Inquiry - Our Strange New Eaarth". Point of Inquiry.
- McKibben, Bill (March 24, 2012). "The rise of public radio in the US". Saturday Extra. Australia: ABC Radio National.
- "Democracy Now! Special 3-Hour Broadcast of the People's Climate March". Democracy Now!. September 21, 2014.

=== Documentary film ===
- Do The Math (2013), 42-minute documentary (written and directed by Kelly Nyks and Jared Scott) on fossil fuel phase-out and fossil fuel divestment, featuring him

== See also ==
- Individual and political action on climate change
