= Political positions of the Republican Party (United States) =

The platform of the Republican Party of the United States has historically been based on American conservatism, contrasting with the modern liberalism of the Democratic Party. The positions of the Republican Party have evolved over time.

Until recently, the party's fiscal conservatism included support for lower taxes, smaller government, free market capitalism, free trade, deregulation of corporations, and restrictions on labor unions. However, starting under the first presidency of Donald Trump and dramatically accelerating in the second presidency of Donald Trump, there has been a major realignment away from fiscal conservatism and the free market towards state capitalism and protectionism through the imposition of large-scale tariffs on the U.S. import of goods from countries around the world, including to raise tax revenue.

The party's social conservatism includes support for gun rights outlined in the Second Amendment, the death penalty, and other traditional values, often with a Christian foundation, including restrictions on abortion. In foreign policy, Republicans usually favor increased military spending, strong national defense, and unilateral action. Other Republican positions include opposition to illegal immigration, drug legalization, and affirmative action, as well as support for school choice, and school prayer.

== Economic issues ==
Historically, the Republican Party since the 1920s has adhered to an ideology of fiscal conservatism. By the 2020s, Republicans have largely abandoned fiscal conservatism as an ideological cornerstone.

Traditional Republicans strongly believe that free markets and individual achievement are the primary factors behind economic prosperity. To this end, they historically advocated in favor of laissez-faire economics, limited government, free markets and free trade, tax cuts, reduced government spending, privatization, and the reduction of government run welfare programs in favor of private-sector nonprofits and encouraging personal responsibility. However, beginning with the first presidency of Donald Trump, some Republicans have switched their support of free trade to trade protectionism in the lead-up to the imposition of nearly global tariffs in 2025 during the second presidency of Donald Trump. By 2025, Trump and Republicans largely abandoned traditional Republican orthodoxy about protecting and promoting the free market, instead, in one case, favoring state capitalism by taking direct government equity stakes in a major US corporation, Intel, in a shift described as a seeming embrace of socialism, Marxism or Maoism.

According to Ross Douthat, the party always had strong bases in the local business community, as well as the national Big Business corporations that emerged in the Gilded Age after the Civil War. That has been changing in the 21st century, as much of Big Business has moved left.

The Republican Party in the Trump era remained a mostly pro-business party in its policies but its constituencies and rhetoric have tilted more working class and populist, with many Romney Republicans drifting into the Democratic coalition....much of corporate America has swung culturally into liberalism’s camp. That process was well underway a decade ago, but it’s been accelerated by anti-Trump backlash, the more left-leaning commitments of big business’s younger customers and (especially) younger employees, and the relative ease with which the radical-sounding language of identity politics can be assimilated to corporate management techniques. As a consequence, today’s G.O.P. is most clearly now the party of local capitalism — the small-business gentry, the family firms.... Much of the party elite wish to continue doing business with big business as before. But the party’s base regards corporate institutions — especially in Silicon Valley, but extending to more traditional capitalist powers — as cultural enemies, with too much consolidated power and too much interest in pressuring, censoring, and propagandizing against socially conservative views and policy.

=== Taxes ===
A leading economic theory advocated by modern Republicans is supply side economics. Some fiscal policies influenced by this theory were popularly known as Reaganomics, a term popularized during the Ronald Reagan administration. This theory holds that reduced income tax rates increase GDP growth and thereby generate the same or more revenue for the government from the smaller tax on the extra growth. This belief is reflected, in part, by the party's long-term advocacy of tax cuts. Many Republicans consider the income tax system to be inherently inefficient and oppose graduated tax rates, which they believe are unfairly targeted at those who create jobs and wealth. They also believe private spending is usually more efficient than government spending. Republicans generally oppose the estate tax.

Between the 19th century and the early-20th century, Republicans favored tariffs to protect and encourage American industry and industrial workers. In 1896, the GOP platform pledged to "renew and emphasize our allegiance to the policy of protection, as the bulwark of American industrial independence, and the foundation of development and prosperity. This true American policy taxes foreign products and encourages home industry. It puts the burden of revenue on foreign goods; it secures the American market for the American producer. It upholds the American standard of wages for the American workingman."

=== Welfare ===
The Republican Party opposes government run welfare programs for the poor, believing that it encourages laziness and dependence on the government. They instead advocate personal responsibility and self-reliance to empower citizens to take responsibility for their own lives. Republicans introduced and strongly supported the welfare reform of 1996, which was signed into law by Democratic President Bill Clinton and limited eligibility for welfare for thousands of American households.

=== Education ===
Most Republicans support school choice through charter schools and school vouchers for private schools; many have denounced the performance of the public school system and teachers unions. The party has insisted on a system of greater accountability for public schools, most prominently in recent years with the No Child Left Behind Act of 2001. The act received bipartisan support in Congress and was signed by President George W. Bush. Many Republicans, however, opposed the creation of the United States Department of Education when it was initially created in 1979.

=== Health care ===
The party opposes a government-run single-payer health care system, claiming it constitutes socialized medicine. It favors a personal or employer-based system of insurance supplemented by Medicare for the elderly and Medicaid which covers approximately 40% of the poor. In 2003, Congress passed the Medicare Modernization Act with bipartisan support creating Medicare Part D covering prescription drugs. It was signed into law by President George W. Bush.

Republicans have a mixed record of supporting Social Security, Medicare, and Medicaid. Congressional Republicans and the Bush administration supported to reduce Medicaid's growth rate; however, congressional Republicans expanded Medicare, supporting a new drug plan for seniors starting in 2006. House Republicans overwhelmingly voted for a proposal known as The Path to Prosperity and for major changes to Medicare, Medicaid, and the Affordable Care Act. Many Republicans support increased health insurance portability, laws promoting coverage of pre-existing medical conditions, a cap on malpractice lawsuits, implementing a streamlined electronic medical records system, an emphasis on preventative care rather than emergency room care, and tax benefits aimed to make health insurance more affordable for the uninsured and to promote universal access. They generally oppose government funding for elective abortions.

By 2020, Republican officials have increasingly adopted anti-vaccine activism and policy.

=== Labor unions ===
Since the 1920s Republicans have generally been opposed to labor unions, which comprise a major component of the Democratic New Deal coalition. Although unions have lost membership in the private sector since the 1970s, they have gained among public sector unions (such as school teachers). Republicans at the state level generally support various right to work laws that weaken unions. At the national level, Republicans supported the Taft–Hartley Act of 1947, which gives workers the right not to participate in unions, as opposed to a closed shop, which prohibits workers from choosing not to join unions in workplaces. Most Republicans are opposed to increases in the minimum wage, believing that such increases hurt many businesses by forcing them to cut jobs and services, export jobs overseas, and raise the prices of goods to compensate for the decrease in profit. As Taylor Dark has emphasized in his analysis of the enduring alliance between labor unions and the Democrats, the unions' "most virulent opponents have moved into the Republican Party".

Republicans elected with Tea Party support in 2010, most notably Governor Scott Walker of Wisconsin, have launched major efforts against public sector unions due in part to state government pension obligations along with the allegation that the unions are too powerful. Walker was challenged by a coalition of unions and Democrats, but beat back a recall effort and was reelected in 2014.

=== Environment ===
Historically, more progressive leaders in the Republican party supported environmental protection. For example, Republican President Theodore Roosevelt was a prominent conservationist whose policies eventually led to the creation of the modern National Park Service. Republican President Richard Nixon was responsible for establishing the Environmental Protection Agency in 1970.

In 2006, Arnold Schwarzenegger, then the Republican Governor of California, signed into law a set of carbon emission regulations that were the country's first cap on greenhouse gases, and included vehicle emissions standards higher than those of the Federal Government. These regulations were opposed by the Bush administration. President George W. Bush publicly opposed ratification of the Kyoto Protocol on the claim that they unfairly targeted Western industrialized nations such as the United States while favoring major polluters such as China and India.

Democrats and Republicans have diverged on the seriousness of the threat posed by climate change, with Republicans' assessment essentially unchanged over the past decade.

The sharp divide over the existence of and responsibility for global warming and climate change falls largely along political lines. Overall, 60% of Americans surveyed said oil and gas companies were "completely or mostly responsible" for climate change.

Opinion about human causation of climate change increased substantially with education among Democrats, but not among Republicans. Conversely, opinions favoring becoming carbon neutral declined substantially with age among Republicans, but not among Democrats.

Right-wing political views in the U.S. correlate with the highest degree of disbelief among any surveyed nation about the seriousness of climate change, underpinning the single widest degree of division (left % minus right %) among those nations.

In 2000, the Republican Party adopted as part of its platform support for the development of market-based solutions to environmental problems. According to the platform, "economic prosperity and environmental protection must advance together, environmental regulations should be based on science, the government's role should be to provide market-based incentives to develop the technologies to meet environmental standards, we should ensure that environmental policy meets the needs of localities, and environmental policy should focus on achieving results processes."

The Bush administration, along with several of the candidates that sought the Republican presidential nomination in 2008, supported increased Federal investment into the development of clean alternative fuels, increased nuclear power, as well as fuels such as ethanol, as a way of helping the U.S. achieve energy independence, as opposed to supporting less use of carbon dioxide-producing methods of generating energy. The Republican party rejects cap-and-trade policy. Some Republicans support increased oil drilling in protected areas such as the Arctic National Wildlife Refuge, a position that has drawn sharp criticism from some environmental activists.

Republican voters are divided over the human causes of climate change and global warming. Since 2008, many members of the Republican Party have been criticized for being anti-environmentalist and promoting climate change denial in opposition to the general scientific consensus, making them unique even among other worldwide conservative parties.

Younger Republicans express higher levels of concern about climate change. When the College Republican National Committee proposed an anti-carbon tax resolution at its 2019 annual meeting, 25 presidents of statewide college Republican groups responded by forming "an advocacy organization to lobby Congress for conservative solutions to the climate crisis."

Green conservatism manifests itself as a movement in groups such as ConservAmerica, which seeks to strengthen the Republican Party's stance on environmental issues and support efforts to conserve natural resources and protect human and environmental health. Nevertheless, because it requires two-thirds of the Senate to agree, the US is the only UN member state which has not ratified the Convention on Biological Diversity.

== Social issues ==
The Republican Party has generally associated with socially conservative policies, although it does have dissenting centrist and libertarian factions. Social conservatives advocate for laws that uphold traditional family values, often rooted in Christianity. Such laws include opposition to abortion, same-sex marriage, transgender rights, comprehensive sex education, and recreational drug use. Most conservative Republicans also oppose gun control, affirmative action, critical race theory, and illegal immigration.

=== Abortion and embryonic stem cell research ===
A majority of the party's national and state candidates are at the very least moderately anti-abortion and oppose elective abortion on religious or moral grounds. However, many hold exceptions in the case of rape, incest or the mother's life being at risk while others may accept early-stage abortions (firmly opposing "partial-birth" abortion still). When Congress voted on the Partial-Birth Abortion Ban Act in 2003, congressional Republicans voted overwhelmingly to support the ban. Recently, many Republicans have shifted their position and now hold exceptions only if the mother's life is at risk.

Although Republicans have voted for increases in government funding of scientific research, some members actively oppose the federal funding of embryonic stem cell research beyond the original lines because it involves the destruction of human embryos, while arguing for applying research money into adult stem cell or amniotic stem cell research. The stem cell issue has garnered two vetoes on research funding bills from President George W. Bush, who said the research "crossed a moral boundary".

The text of the 2012 party platform specifically stated that "the unborn child has a fundamental individual right to life which cannot be infringed." It also opposed using public revenues to promote abortions, to perform them, or to fund organizations that do either such things.

Not all Republicans support abortion restrictions and the human life amendment. Though anti-abortion planks have been part of the party platform since 1976, before 1988 there was little difference between Republicans and other voters regarding abortion, and in 2015, 40 percent of Republicans supported legal abortion. Despite their divergence from the party platform, pro-abortion rights Republicans are unlikely to switch parties. Pro-abortion rights ideology has been present in the Republican Party since before the Roe v. Wade decision in 1973, and the pro-abortion rights ideology is still present today.

According to some pro-abortion rights Republican groups, the Republican belief in limited government and individualism should extend to social issues, such as abortion rights. Research indicates that supporters of pro-abortion rights Republican organizations are motivated by libertarianism. Supporters of pro-abortion rights organizations may hold less conservative views on abortion, but tend to hold relatively conservative views on other political issues.

Support for abortion rights ranges. The 1992 American National Election study asked respondents about their support for the legal rights of abortion. Respondents either believe abortion should only be allowed in cases of rape, incest, and to save the mother's life, abortion should be allowed if there is a "clear need," or that abortion should not be restricted in any way.

There are several organizations and Political Action Committees that support pro-abortion rights republican candidates. The most prominent are Republican Majority for Choice, Republicans for Choice, and The Wish List. These organizations provide money, endorsements, and training to candidates who support abortion rights. Republican Main Street Partnership has shown support for pro-abortion rights legislation.

The Republican Party's shift to an anti-abortion stance was a gradual change and was not caused by one election or event.

==== 1970s and 1980s ====
Early abortion laws only allowed the procedure when the woman's life was in danger. At this time many Republicans and Democrats supported less strict abortion laws. Between 1974 and 1978, studies showed that political ideology had a very weak correlation with support for abortion rights. The correlation between political party identification and support for abortion rights was even weaker. Mary Louise Smith, the chairwoman of the Republican National Committee from 1974 to 1977, was pro-abortion rights. Justice Harry Blackmun wrote the Supreme Courts decision on Roe v. Wade. Blackmun had been conservative Justice appointed by President Nixon, who came out against abortion. After Roe v. Wade, though, Blackmun gradually evolved into a liberal. Some say this issue was the symbolic move of Blackmun to becoming a liberal.

During his presidency, President Gerald R. Ford took a moderately conservative stance on abortion, despite First Lady Betty Ford's urges for him to take a liberal stance on the issue. Ford believed abortions should be allowed in certain circumstances, such as rape and incest, and opposed a human life amendment to the Constitution. After winning the primary, Ford stated he was also unconditionally anti-abortion and fully supported the Republican platform in 1976. Still, Ford later stated that he was pro-abortion rights after he had left office and Betty Ford was supportive of the decision made by the court in Roe v. Wade.

The 1976 Republican Party Platform was the first to include an anti-abortion stance. This came during the same year that the Hyde Amendment was passed. Ronald Reagan's run in the primary for the nomination played a role in getting an anti-abortion plank along with some other positions on other issues into the platform.

Democratic and Republican Party elites and elected officials became more divided on the issue of abortion in the 1980s. Still, Ronald Reagan ran and won the election in 1980, stating he was against all abortions except for saving the life of the mother. He firmly supported Roe v. Wade being overturned and a constitutional amendment banning abortion. Bob Dole, who ran in the primary for president in 1980, also firmly opposed abortion. George H. W. Bush, who also ran in the primary, was firmly pro-abortion rights. Bush wound up being Reagan's vice presidential running mate and after that, he distanced himself from that issue. It was not until after Republicans in Congress started consistently voting against abortion in the 1980s that polls showed Republican opposition to abortion.

==== 1990 to current ====
Until 1988, there was little difference in pro-abortion rights attitudes among Democratic and Republican voters. George H.W. Bush entered politics with a reputation as a moderate on social issues. However, during a 1988 presidential debate he stated after some reflection he came to the conclusion abortion was morally wrong and should only be legal for rape, incest, and to save the life of the mother. He chose Dan Quayle as his running mate, who also opposed abortion.

During the 1992 election, President Bush and Vice President Quayle tended to downplay the importance of abortion during the election so they would not risk turning away Republican voters who supported abortion rights. A substantial number of Pro-abortion rights republicans in the 1992 election did not vote for President Bush because of his stance on abortion. Most of these pro-abortion rights Republicans voted for Perot. While President Bush and the Republican Party took an anti-abortion stance in 1992, First Lady Barbara Bush stated that she believed abortion to be a "personal choice."

In an interview in 2001, First Lady Laura Bush stated that she believed Roe v. Wade should not be overturned and later stated that abortion should remain legal because she believes "it's important for people, for medical reasons and other reasons." George W. Bush though stated he was still anti-abortion and while he would be appointing conservative judges abortion would not be used as a litmus test.

In 2005, The Stem Cell Research Enhancement Act was passed by congress with the help of the Republican Main Street Partnership. However, President George W. Bush vetoed this legislation in 2006.

After the 2012 election, Senator John McCain, who is anti-abortion, advised his fellow Republicans to "leave the issue [abortion] alone." He warned against going beyond stating one's anti-abortion belief and actions could hurt the Republican party with women voters and young voters. Like Bush I & II, Dole, Reagan, and Ford, McCain promised conservative constructionist judges but again stated he would not use abortion as a litmus test. Mitt Romney as governor of Massachusetts was firmly pro-abortion rights but he became anti-abortion running for president in 2012 and stated the same thing about conservative judges but not using abortion as a litmus test.

Donald Trump has shifted his position on abortion. For decades as a Democrat and independent he was firmly pro-abortion rights, but by at least 2011 (when he was considering running for president), Trump often iterated a pro-life stance. Trump said during his 2016 campaign that he would appoint pro-life judges to the US Supreme Court and lower courts. He later said he was not allowed to ask a judge for their personal positions on issues, but affirmed he would appoint judges that interpret rather than make law and on abortion they would hopefully see it as a constitutional issue, turning the rulings over to the states and overturning Roe v. Wade. Trump did state he believed in exceptions of rape and incest as well as to saving the life of the mother on his anti-abortion stance.

=== Affirmative action ===
Republicans, especially Republican women, are generally against affirmative action for women and some minorities, often describing it as a 'quota system', and believing that it is not meritocratic and that it is counter-productive socially by only further promoting discrimination. Many Republicans support race-neutral admissions policies in universities, but support taking into account the socioeconomic status of the student.

=== Capital punishment ===
The Republican Party supports strong law and order policies to control crime. The vast majority of Republicans support capital punishment. Official party platforms have consistently argued that the death penalty is an effective deterrent to crime and ensures safer neighborhoods, citing the rising crime rates in recent decades. Republicans do not view capital punishment as cruel and unusual punishment nor unconstitutional, therefore opposing any attempts at criminal justice reform aimed at repealing the penalty.

=== Gun ownership ===
U.S. opinion on gun control issues is deeply divided along political lines, as shown in this 2021 survey.

Republicans generally support gun ownership rights and oppose laws regulating guns and other related topic areas such as bump stocks and large-capacity magazines. However, recently, some moderate Republicans have started to be an exception to this. On the evening of Wednesday, November 28, 2018, President Donald Trump announced that his administration would be banning bump stocks. Some Republicans support this and some do not, causing some divide within the party.

=== Drug legalization ===
Republicans have historically supported the war on drugs and oppose the legalization of drugs. In recent years, the opposition to the legalization of marijuana is not as strong as it used to be, with some Republicans members of Congress advocating for decriminalization or legalization of marijuana, as well as criminal justice reform in the context of drug crimes.

=== Immigration ===
Republicans are divided on how to confront illegal immigration between a platform that allows for migrant workers and easing citizenship guidelines, and border enforcement-first approach. In general, pro-growth advocates within the Republican Party and it support more immigration, and traditional or populist conservatives oppose it. In 2006, the White House supported and Republican-led Senate passed comprehensive immigration reform that would eventually allow millions of illegal immigrants to become citizens, but the House, also led by Republicans, took an enforcement-first approach, and the bill failed to pass the conference committee.

Lately, after the defeat in the 2012 presidential elections, and considering the low percent of Latino Americans that voted for Republicans, several Republicans are advocating a friendlier approach to immigrants. Former U.S. Secretary of Commerce Carlos Gutierrez is promoting the creation of a SuperPAC for immigration reform.

Proposals calling for systematic reform of the U.S. immigration system such that residents that have come into the U.S. illegally have a pathway to legal citizenship have attracted broad Republican support in some polls. For example, the Public Religion Research Institute found in late 2013 that 60% of Republicans supported the pathway concept, compared to 63% of Americans as a whole.

The 2024 party platform called for the mass deportation of all illegal immigrants in the United States, the construction of a border wall along the Mexico–United States border, stricter vetting, and a merit-based immigration system while opposing sanctuary cities and family-sponsored immigration.

=== LGBTQ+ issues ===
The Republican platform, as of to date, is officially opposed to same-sex marriage and other LGBT issues. Groups advocating for LGBT issues inside the party include the Log Cabin Republicans, Young Conservatives for the Freedom to Marry, and College Republicans. In the aftermath of the U.S. Supreme Court's ruling in Obergefell v. Hodges that ended bans on same-sex marriage nationwide, the Republican Party is divided as to whether to accept the ruling or to fight it by measures such as a possible amendment to the Constitution. Individuals such as 2016 presidential candidates Ted Cruz and Scott Walker have supported an amendment to re-expand government and re-ban same-sex marriages, while other Republican figures such as Jeb Bush (also a 2016 presidential candidate) have disagreed. The 2016 platform, however, condemned the Supreme Court's ruling and defined marriage as "natural marriage, the union of one man and one woman."

A November/December 2013 Public Religion Research Institute poll sponsored by the Ford Foundation found that Republicans are divided in their perceptions of their own party: 45% think Republicans are friendly toward LGBT people, while 41% think the party is unfriendly toward them. A May 2012 poll found that 37% of Republicans supported a constitutional amendment defining marriage between a man and a woman. A November/December 2013 poll found that 63% of Republicans believe same-sex marriage should be left up to individual states to decide. In 2017, Pew Research polling found that for the first time a majority of Republicans weren't opposed to same-sex marriage, with 48% against and 47% in favor.

==== Military service ====
The 1992 Republican Party platform adopted support for continuing to exclude homosexuals from the military as a matter of good order and discipline. The support for the exclusion of homosexuals from military service would remain in the Republican Party platform until the 2012 Republican Party platform, which removed that language from it. A May 2012 United Technologies/National Journal Congressional Connection Poll found that only 41% of Republicans supported restoring the prohibition against gays serving openly in the military.

==== Anti-discrimination laws ====
The 1992 Republican Party platform adopted opposition to including sexual orientation into anti-discrimination statutes. The 2000 Republican Party platform included the statement: "We support the First Amendment right of freedom of association and stand united with private organizations, such as the Boy Scouts of America, and support their positions." The 2004 Republican Party platform removed both parts of that language from the platform and stated that the party supports anti-discrimination legislation. The 2008 and 2012 Republican Party platform supported anti-discrimination statues based on sex, race, age, religion, creed, disability, or national origin, but both platforms were silent on sexual orientation and gender identity.

A November/December 2013 Public Religion Research Institute poll sponsored by the Ford Foundation found that 61% of Republicans support laws protecting gay and lesbian people against employment discrimination, with only 33% opposing such laws. A 2007 Gallup poll showed 60% of Republicans supported expanding federal hate crime laws to include sexual orientation and gender identity, with only 30% opposing such laws.

=== School prayer ===
The Republican Party supports school-sanctioned school prayer, which has been banned in public schools ever since Engel v. Vitale. They have continued to challenge such decisions for pushing Christianity out of America's public schools. Many also support the right of teachers to teach creationism or intelligent design alongside evolution to public school students.

== Foreign policy issues ==
In modern times, the Republican Party has been militaristic and nationalistic in its foreign policy. Republicans, in general, tend to be more pro-military than their Democratic counterparts, however, the factions of the Republican party do not see eye-to-eye on this. Neoconservative Republicans and subscribers to other such ideologies tend to advocate for a more interventionist foreign policy, a bigger military, and using the military to promote American values around the world, while the more libertarian and paleoconservative factions of the party advocate for non-interventionism. Libertarian Republicans call for less government spending on defense, but paleoconservatives usually are pro-strong national defense, and therefore sometimes are in favor of more defense spending.

Republicans supported Woodrow Wilson's call for American entry into World War I in 1917, complaining only that he was too slow to go to war. Republicans in 1919 opposed his call for entry into the League of Nations. A majority supported the League with reservations; a minority opposed membership on any terms. Republicans sponsored world disarmament in the 1920s, and isolationism in the 1930s. Most Republicans staunchly opposed intervention in World War II until the Japanese attack on Pearl Harbor in 1941. By 1945, however, internationalists became dominant in the party which supported the Cold War policies such as the Truman Doctrine, the Marshall Plan, and NATO.

=== Neoconservatism ===
Many liberal Democrats in the 1960s and 1970s who became disenchanted with the leftward movement of their party often became "neoconservatives" ("neocons"). Many became politically prominent during the five cumulative presidential terms under Reagan, and the father-son presidency from the Bush family. They played a major role in promoting and planning the 2003 invasion of Iraq. Vice President Dick Cheney and Secretary of Defense Donald Rumsfeld, while not identifying themselves as neoconservatives, listened closely to neoconservative advisers regarding foreign policy, especially the defense of Israel, the promotion of democracy in the Middle East, and the buildup of American military forces to achieve these goals. Neocons show a preference for unilateral American activism, along with skepticism regarding the United Nations. The neocons had little influence in the Obama White House, but neoconservatism remains a staple in Republican Party arsenal. Neoconservatives were more likely than other Republicans to oppose the presidency of Donald Trump.

=== Unilateralism ===
Many in the Republican Party support unilateralism on issues of national security, believing in the ability and right of the United States to act without external support in matters of its national defense. In general, Republican thinking on defense and international relations is heavily influenced by the theories of neorealism and realism, characterizing conflicts between nations as struggles between faceless forces of international structure, as opposed to being the result of the ideas and actions of individual leaders. The realist school's influence shows in Reagan's Evil Empire stance on the Soviet Union and George W. Bush's Axis of evil.

=== War on terror ===
Republicans secured gains in the 2002 and 2004 elections, with the war on terror being one of the top issues favoring them. Since the September 11, 2001 attacks, some in the party support neoconservative policies with regard to the war on terror, including the 2001 war in Afghanistan and the 2003 invasion of Iraq.

The doctrine of preemptive war, wars to disarm and destroy potential military foes based on speculation of future attacks rather than in defense against actual attack, has been advocated by prominent members of the Bush administration, but the war within Iraq has undercut the influence of this doctrine within the Republican Party. Rudy Giuliani, mayor of New York at the time of the September 11 terrorist attacks, and a candidate for the Republican presidential nomination in 2008, has stated his support for that policy, saying America must keep itself "on the offensive" against terrorists.

=== Torture ===
The George W. Bush administration took the position that the Geneva Conventions do not apply to unlawful combatants, saying they apply to soldiers serving in the armies of nation states and not terrorist organizations such as Al-Qaeda. The Supreme Court overruled this position in Hamdan v. Rumsfeld, which held that the Geneva Conventions were legally binding and must be followed in regards to all enemy combatants. Some prominent Republicans such as John McCain, Mike Huckabee, Ted Cruz and Ron Paul strongly oppose the use of enhanced interrogation techniques, which they view as torture.

=== Trade ===
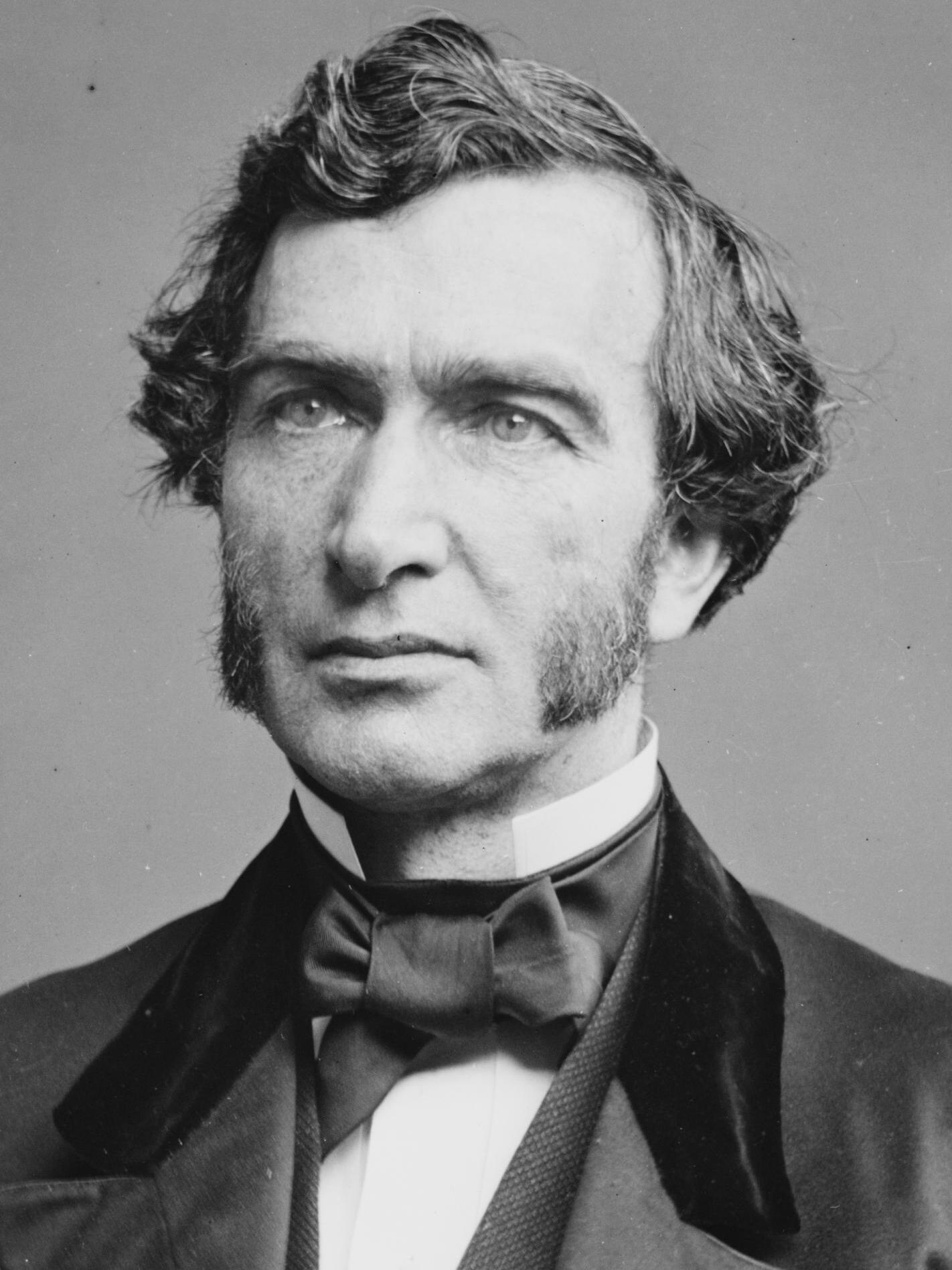
Representative Justin S. Morrill (R-VT) drafted the Morrill Tariff, inaugurating a period of protectionism in the United States until 1913.

The Republican Party has taken widely varying views on international trade throughout its history. It currently largely opposes free trade, though it supports maintaining existing free trade agreements. At its inception, the Republican Party supported protective tariffs, with the Morrill Tariff being enacted during the presidency of Abraham Lincoln. In the 1896 presidential election, Republican presidential candidate William McKinley campaigned heavily on high tariffs, having been the creator and namesake for the McKinley Tariff of 1890. In the early 20th century the Republican Party began splitting on tariffs, with the great battle over the high Payne–Aldrich Tariff Act in 1910 splitting the party and causing a realignment. Democratic president Woodrow Wilson cut rates with the 1913 Underwood Tariff and the coming of World War I in 1914 radically revised trade patterns due to reduced trade. Also, the new revenues generated by the federal income tax due to the 16th amendment made tariffs less important in terms of economic impact and political rhetoric. When the Republicans returned to power in 1921 they again imposed a protective tariff. They raised it again with the Smoot–Hawley Tariff Act of 1930 to meet the Great Depression in the United States, but the depression only worsened and Democrat Franklin D. Roosevelt became president from 1932 to 1945.

The Reciprocal Tariff Act of 1934 marked a sharp departure from the era of protectionism in the United States. American duties on foreign products declined from an average of 46% in 1934 to 12% by 1962, which included the presidency of Republican president Dwight D. Eisenhower. After World War II, the U.S. promoted the General Agreement on Tariffs and Trade (GATT) established in 1947, to minimize tariffs and other restrictions, and to liberalize trade among all capitalist countries. During the Reagan and George H. W. Bush administrations, Republicans abandoned protectionist policies and came out against quotas and in favor of the GATT and the World Trade Organization policy of minimal economic barriers to global trade. Free trade with Canada came about as a result of the Canada–U.S. Free Trade Agreement of 1987, which led in 1994 to the North American Free Trade Agreement (NAFTA) based on Reagan's plan to enlarge the scope of the market for American firms to include Canada and Mexico. President Bill Clinton, with strong Republican support in 1993, pushed NAFTA through Congress over the vehement objection of labor unions.

In the 21st century, opinions on trade and protectionism have fluctuated, more recently splitting roughly on partisan lines. In 2017, only 36% of Republicans agreed that free trade agreements are good for the United States, compared to 67% of Democrats. When asked if free trade has helped respondents specifically, the approval numbers for Democrats drop to 54%, however approval ratings among Republicans remain relatively unchanged at 34%. The 2016 election marked the beginning of the trend of returning to protectionism, an ideology incorporated into Republican president Donald Trump's platform. During his presidency, Trump withdrew the United States from the Trans-Pacific Partnership, initiated a trade war with China, and negotiated the USMCA as a successor to NAFTA.

=== Foreign aid ===
The 2012 Republican Party platform opposes the Obama administration from attempting to impose what it considers a "cultural agenda", including a "homosexual rights agenda" in other countries by restricting foreign aid. However, Republicans themselves have also frequently advocated for restricting foreign aid as a means of asserting the national security and immigration interests of the United States.

=== Foreign relations ===
==== Canada ====
Republicans support the construction of the Keystone Pipeline, which would connect the Athabasca oil sands in Canada to refineries in the United States. American and Canadian environmentalists have strongly opposed the pipeline's construction, although the Canadian government has lobbied for it.

==== Israel ====
The Republican Party generally supports a strong alliance with Israel and efforts to secure peace in the Middle East between Israel and its Arab neighbors.

==== Puerto Rico ====
The 2016 Republican Party Platform declares: "We support the right of the United States citizens of Puerto Rico to be admitted to the Union as a fully sovereign state. We further recognize the historic significance of the 2012 local referendum in which a 54 percent majority voted to end Puerto Rico's current status as a U.S. territory, and 61 percent chose statehood over options for sovereign nationhood. We support the federally sponsored political status referendum authorized and funded by an Act of Congress in 2014 to ascertain the aspirations of the people of Puerto Rico. Once the 2012 local vote for statehood is ratified, Congress should approve an enabling act with terms for Puerto Rico's future admission as the 51st state of the Union".

==== Russia ====
The Republican party argues that with Russia, the U.S. must show resilience and patience. It also argues that Russia must stop encouraging the proliferation of weapons of mass destruction. The party stresses the common interests of the two countries, which include ending terrorism, combating nuclear proliferation, promoting bilateral trade. Leading Republicans have been split on how to respond to the Russian military interventions in Ukraine and Syria, with some advocating a more hawkish approach, and others urging a more cautious and conciliatory response.

=== Public opinion on foreign policy ===
In June 2014, the Quinnipiac Poll asked Americans which foreign policy they preferred:

A) The United States is doing too much in other countries around the world, and it is time to do less around the world and focus more on our own problems here at home.
B) The United States must continue to push forward to promote democracy and freedom in other countries around the world because these efforts make our own country more secure.

Democrats, Republicans, and Independents all chose A over B by 65% to 32%, by 56% to 39%, and by 67% to 29%, respectively.

== Other issues ==
=== Separation of powers ===
Many contemporary Republicans voice support of strict constructionism or textualism, the judicial philosophy that the Constitution should be interpreted narrowly and as close to the original intent as is practicable rather than a more flexible "living Constitution" model. Most Republicans point to Roe v. Wade as a case of judicial activism, where the court overturned most laws restricting abortion on the basis of a right to privacy inferred from the Bill of Rights and the Fourteenth Amendment to the United States Constitution. Some Republicans have actively sought to block judges whom they see as being activist judges and have sought the appointment of judges who claim to practice judicial restraint. The issue of judicial deference to the legislature is a matter of some debate—like the Democrats, most Republicans criticize court decisions that overturn their own (conservative) legislation as overstepping bounds and support decisions that overturn opposing legislation. Some commentators have advocated that the Republicans take a more aggressive approach and support legislative supremacy more firmly.

The Republican Party has supported various bills within the last decade to strip some or all federal courts of the ability to hear certain types of cases, in an attempt to strengthen the power of individual state's rights. These jurisdiction stripping laws have included removing federal review of the recognition of same-sex marriage with the Marriage Protection Act, the constitutionality of the Pledge of Allegiance with the Pledge Protection Act, and the rights of detainees in Guantanamo Bay in the Detainee Treatment Act. The Supreme Court overruled the last of these limitations in Hamdan v. Rumsfeld. Compared to Democrats, many Republicans believe in a more robust version of federalism with greater limitations placed upon federal authorities and a larger role reserved for those of the individual States. Following this view on federalism, Republicans often take a less expansive reading of congressional power under the Commerce Clause, such as in the opinion of William Rehnquist in United States v. Lopez. Many Republicans on the more libertarian wing wish for a more dramatic narrowing of Commerce Clause power by revisiting, among other cases, Wickard v. Filburn, a case that held that growing wheat on a farm for consumption on the same farm fell under congressional power to "regulate commerce ... among the several States".

President George W. Bush was a proponent of the unitary executive theory and cited it within his Signing statements about legislation passed by Congress. The administration's interpretation of the unitary executive theory was called seriously into question by Hamdan v. Rumsfeld, where the Supreme Court ruled 5–3 that the President does not have sweeping powers to override or ignore laws through his power as commander in chief, stating "the Executive is bound to comply with the Rule of Law that prevails." Following the ruling, the Bush administration sought congressional authorization for programs started only on executive mandate, as was the case with the Military Commissions Act, or abandoned programs it had previously asserted executive authority to enact, as in the case of the National Security Agency domestic wiretapping program.

=== States' rights ===
Ideologically, the GOP typically supports a smaller federal government. Historically, this translated into keeping power in the hands of powerful state governments, as in the cases of civil rights, abortion laws, regulations on marriage, and mapping of voting districts. However, some conservatives in recent years have demanded federal intervention to oppose state laws with respect to the Federal Marriage Amendment, the Terri Schiavo case, the Kelo case regarding eminent domain, and in cases involving assisted suicide laws and medical marijuana. To a certain extent, this is contingent upon the faction in question. For example, the paleoconservative and social conservative factions would be far more inclined to favor federal drug regulations trumping states' rights, while the libertarian faction would be more inclined to see such power devolved to the states or even further.

=== Lack of platform in 2020 ===
In 2020, the Republican Party decided not to write a platform for that presidential election cycle; instead, the party simply expressed its support for Donald Trump's agenda, and criticizing "the media" for biased reporting. This was cited by critics as an example of how the Republican Party "became a cult of personality".

=== Embrace of Trumpism and far-right ideology ===
The election of Trump in 2016 saw the Republican Party shift to embrace and bring far-right, fringe, and extreme ideas and organizations into the mainstream. His election shifted traditional Republican beliefs and ideology into a new leadership style and political agenda referred to as Trumpism. This realignment saw a reflexive opposition of liberal policies to "own the libs" become a core belief among its base.

Trump explicitly and routinely disparages racial, religious, and ethnic minorities, and scholars consistently find that racial animus regarding black people, immigrants, and Muslims are the best predictors of support for Trump. By 2025, congressional Republicans have increasingly used overtly bigoted language and offensive tropes against the racial and religious identity of their political opponents with little to no pushback from GOP leadership. In 2026, elected Republicans have increasingly used blatantly anti-Muslim rhetoric which was described by commentators as mirroring a prior increase in such rhetoric by the GOP following the 9/11 attacks in 2001.

The second presidency of Trump saw him nominate several White House officials, such as Paul Ingrassia and Kingsley Wilson, with ties to antisemitic extremists. His administration promoted social media content promoting remigration and containing antisemitic slurs, and was criticized as promoting Nazism and white nationalism, the latter of which has become influential within the party since the 2020s. Other social media posts from multiple government agencies have variously alluded to neo-Nazi and white supremacist literature and promoted ethnic cleansing and QAnon conspiracies. The Southern Poverty Law Center found that some "images and language appear to come directly from antisemitic and neo-Nazi publications and a white Christian nationalist website".

According to The New York Times, Republican youth groups have grown increasingly divided over the acceptance and prevalence of far-right speakers and ideology. In October 2025, Politico revealed leaked group chats among high-ranking leaders of the "Young Republicans" that included language praising Adolf Hitler and promoting Nazism, encouraging the rape and killing of political opponents, extensive use of antisemitic and racial slurs, and favorable opinions on slavery. The messages drew bipartisan condemnation, and another incident involving the display of an American flag with a swastika in Republican Congressman David Taylor's office a day later spurred significant political commentary about the future of the GOP and condemnation about the prominence of Nazi ideology within the party. The same month, Politico posted more leaked messages from Paul Ingrassia, then the Republican nominee for Office of Special Council, where he stated he had "a Nazi streak", that he wanted white men in positions of leadership, used ethnic slurs for Black people and Italians, and proposed making Kwanzaa and all celebrations of Black culture illegal. In March 2026, group chats among young Republicans created by the Miami-Dade Republican Party included slurs against Black and Jewish people, killing African-Americans, and Hitler's policies. Politico reported that several more scandals in 2026 involving Republican officials making controversial remarks led to concerns over the influence of "Groypers" and far-right ideology among young Republicans, with the conservative Manhattan Institute finding 31% of Republicans under the age of 50 self-identified as having "racist" views.

Starting in October 2025, Axios, Politico, The Economist, The Wall Street Journal, and The New York Times described the party as undergoing a "rift" among a growing cohort of anti-Jewish and antisemitic voices within the party and debate over how expansive the party's coalition should be. In January 2026, Trump publicly came out against those with antisemitic views in the party, which The New York Times and The Economist described as being contrasted with J.D. Vance's prior refusal to condemn the incidents and statement that the party did not need "purity tests".

Beginning in the early 2020s, several Republican politicians have been promoting the Great Replacement conspiracy theory.

== See also ==
- Political positions of the Democratic Party (United States)
- History of the Republican Party (United States)
- Factions in the Republican Party (United States)
