= Deep Economy =

Book by Bill McKibben

Deep Economy: The Wealth of Communities and the Durable Future
- Author: Bill McKibben
- Genre: non-fiction
- Publisher: Henry Holt & Company
- Publication date: March 2007
- Pages: 271
- ISBN: 978-0-8050-7626-4
- OCLC: 71812887
- Dewey Decimal: 306.3 22
- LC Class: HD75 .M353 2007

Deep Economy: The Wealth of Communities and the Durable Future is a non-fiction work by environmentalist Bill McKibben published in the field of ecological economics in 2007. The work promoted sustainable economy in close-knit communities. These include regions that generate their own food, their own energy, their own culture, and their own entertainment. McKibben defined a "deep economy" as one that "cares less about quantity than about quality; that takes as its goal the production of human satisfaction as much as surplus material; that is focused on the idea that it might endure and considers durability at least as important as increases in size." The book has been generally well-received, though some critics have questioned his proposed solutions.

== Overview ==
The long-standing presumption that "more" equals "better" in economic growth is questioned by McKibben, who asks if in fact this idea is valid. McKibben also suggests that unfettered growth is not a realistic, sustainable goal. According to McKibben, the invention of the steam engine and the Industrial Revolution in 1712 resulted in a mindset which rapidly altered expectations of economic growth. He also said that, "The current political assumption ignores both the problems of resource depletion and inequity, which leads to human unhappiness." In its place, McKibben suggested that the focus should be on "deep economy", which includes, rather than constant growth, a consideration of human satisfaction.

As an example of the problem with the current philosophy, McKibben focuses extensively on global, industrial agriculture, which he argues has endangered localized farming communities, damaged the environment, increased the risk of terrorist sabotage of a central food supply, increased food-borne illnesses, led to more mistreatment of farmworkers, and accelerated the depletion of water and oil. The solution to these problems, he suggests, is community-centered farming as currently practiced in Cuba, with similar projects in New England and Detroit. He also examines the West's attitude towards economic inequity. The mega-rich are praised and admired, a symptom of the "hyper-individualization" that McKibben regards as a social failure, ecologically, politically and morally. Human beings are psychologically healthier, not to mention happier, when part of a community. Accordingly, community-based economies, wherein goods are locally produced and consumed, foster neighborliness and happiness.

To the end of fostering close communities, McKibben offers several suggestions, ranging from encouraging the use of public transportation to offering a close living environment where multiple residents share living spaces in interconnected condominiums; from developing sustainable alternative energy sources to developing and utilizing a local currency (such as BerkShares) in addition to a national one.

By contrast to such economists and commentators as Deirdre McCloskey, Thomas Friedman and Jeffrey Sachs, McKibben does not promote globalization in the developing world, which he views as an ineffective means of raising the global standard of living and unsustainable given limited global resources.

== Critical reception ==
The book was generally well-received, with critics praising the presentation though sometimes questioning his solutions. Preceding their interview with the author, Salon.com described his future as "credible" and his account of the problems the world faces and the path to the current crisis "compelling." Bloomberg suggested that "the book is given to one-sidedness and oversimplification", with answers that may not be workable, but added that it isn't gloomy or "tedious...: it has barely a dull sentence" as McKibben "makes his case with flair and a wealth of fascinating detail...." A review in The New York Times by Lance Morrow noted that the book was "suffused with a certain Vermontlichkeit" and offers the occasional "ghastly idea", but cautioned, "It would be unwise to dismiss McKibben’s ideas as pipe dreams or Luddism. He makes his case on anecdotal, environmental, moral and, as it were, aesthetic grounds."
