= Eaarth =

2010 book written by Bill McKibben

- Author: Bill McKibben
- Original title: Eaarth: Making a Life on a Tough New Planet
- Publisher: Henry Holt and Company
- Publication date: 2010
- ISBN: 978-0-8050-9056-7

Eaarth: Making a Life on a Tough New Planet is a book written by Bill McKibben, published by Henry Holt and Company in 2010.

In the opening chapter, McKibben presents an array of facts and statistics about climate change that are already visible, supported by extensive footnotes. In the second and third chapters, McKibben lays out his analysis of how we have arrived at the current situation, and conveys genuine sorrow as he explains how the drive for economic growth based on hydrocarbons since the 1970s has led the planet to the point of breakdown.

In a review of the book, British economist Nicholas Stern suggests that there is no doubting McKibben’s sincerity and his ability to communicate the significant risks which humanity faces. According to Stern, his "overall thesis that we are already seeing widespread effects of climate change is sound and supported by much robust scientific evidence". Stern says McKibben is too pessimistic when it comes to the recent advances in avoiding even bigger changes to the climate by reducing emissions of greenhouse gases.
