= The End of Nature =

1989 book by Bill McKibben

- First edition
- Author: Bill McKibben
- Language: English
- Subject: Global warming
- Publisher: Random House
- Publication date: 1989
- Publication place: United States
- Media type: Print
- Pages: 230
- ISBN: 0-394-57601-2

The End of Nature is a book written by Bill McKibben, published by Random House in 1989. It has been called the first book on global warming written for a general audience. McKibben had thought that simply stating the problem would provoke people to action.

== Premise ==
He describes nature as a force previously independent of human beings but now directly affected by the actions of people.

"If the waves crash up against the beach, eroding dunes and destroying homes, it is not the awesome power of Mother Nature. It is the awesome power of Mother Nature as altered by the awesome power of man, who has overpowered in a century the processes that have been slowly evolving and changing of their own accord since the earth was born."

He offers two paths forward: "The Defiant Reflex" or a "more humble" way of living.
