= Political positions of the Democratic Party (United States) =

The platform of the Democratic Party of the United States is generally based on modern liberalism, contrasting with the right-wing populism and neo-nationalism of the Republican Party. The party generally sits on the center to center-left of the American political spectrum. The Democratic Party's political positions derive from the New Left and the unique demographics of the United States.

The Democratic Party's political positions have the strongest appeal to African Americans and voters with college degrees, but not to white working class voters.

Democratic platforms seek to promote free trade, social programs, labor unions, consumer protection, workplace safety regulation, equal opportunity, disability rights, racial equity, regulations against environmental pollution, and criminal justice reform. Democrats support abortion rights, the LGBT community, and a pathway to citizenship for undocumented immigrants. Democrats typically agree with the scientific consensus on climate change and favor a multilateral approach in foreign policy.

== Demographics ==
It is a party that appeals to highly educated White voters, African Americans, urban voters, younger voters, irreligious voters, the unmarried, and LGBTQ people.

- Among White voters, it does well only among voters with high educational attainment, particularly White people with graduate degrees and White women with college degrees.
- The Democratic Party has weak appeal among White voters without college degrees and White Southerners, regardless of income.

== Economic issues ==
Equal economic opportunity, a robust social safety net, and strong labor unions have long been at the heart of Democratic economic policy. The party favors a mixed economy and generally supports a progressive tax system, higher minimum wages, Social Security, universal health care, public education, and subsidized housing. It also supports infrastructure development and clean energy investments to achieve economic development and job creation.

=== Fiscal policy ===
Democrats support a more progressive tax structure to provide more services and reduce economic inequality by making sure that the wealthiest Americans pay the highest tax rate. They also support more government spending on social services while spending less on the military. They oppose cutting social services, such as Social Security, Medicare, and Medicaid, believing cuts to be harmful to efficiency and social justice. Democrats believe the benefits of social services include a more productive labor force and that these benefits are greater than those that could be derived from lower taxes, especially for top earners. Furthermore, Democrats view social services as essential to providing positive freedom (i.e., freedom derived from economic opportunity). The Democratic-led House of Representatives reinstated the PAYGO (pay-as-you-go) budget rule early in the 110th Congress.

=== Minimum wage ===
Democrats favor raising the minimum wage and believe that all Americans have the right to a fair wage. They call for a $15.00/hour national minimum wage and believe it should be adjusted regularly. The Fair Minimum Wage Act of 2007 was an early component of the party's agenda during the 110th Congress. In 2006, Democrats supported six state ballot initiatives to increase the minimum wage; all six initiatives passed.

=== Health care ===
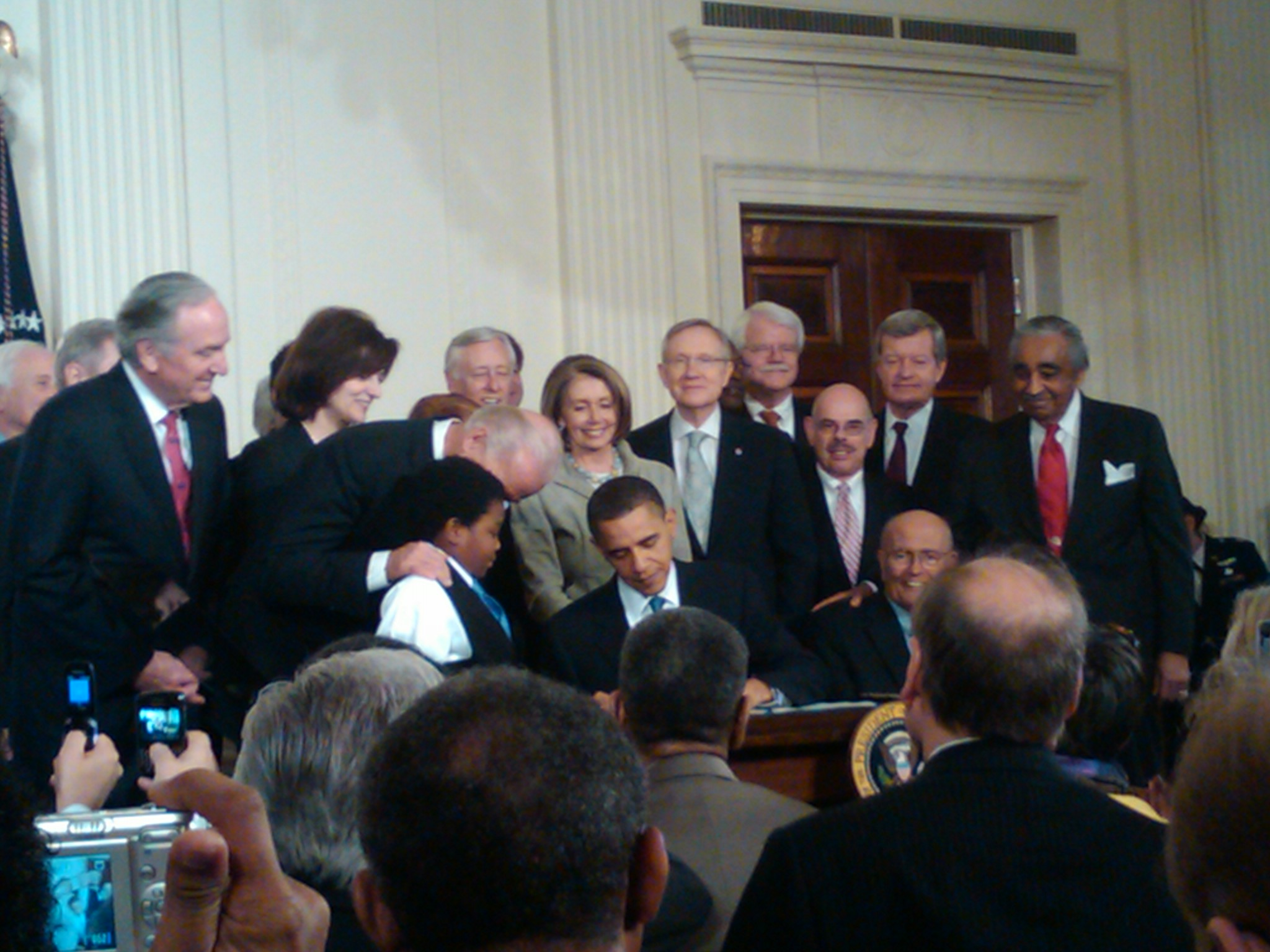
President Barack Obama signing the Patient Protection and Affordable Care Act into law at the White House on March 23, 2010

Democrats call for "affordable and quality health care" and favor moving toward universal health care in various forms to address rising healthcare costs. Some Democratic politicians favor a single-payer program or Medicare for All, while others prefer a public health insurance option.

The Patient Protection and Affordable Care Act (also known as "Obamacare"), which President Barack Obama signed into law on March 23, 2010, has been one of the most significant efforts toward universal health care. As of December 2019, more than 20 million Americans have gained health insurance under the Affordable Care Act.

=== Education ===
Democrats favor improving public education by raising school standards and reforming the Head Start program. They also support universal preschool and expanding access to primary education (some Democrats who support this through charter schools). They call for slashes in student loan debt and support reforms to reduce tuition fees. Other proposed reforms have included nationwide universal preschool education, tuition-free or reduced-tuition college, and reforms of standardized testing. Democrats have the long-term aim of providing low-cost, publicly funded college education with low tuition (as in much of Europe and Canada), available to every eligible American student. Alternatively, they encourage expanding access to post-secondary education by increasing state funding for student financial aid, such as Pell Grants and college tuition tax deductions.

=== Environment ===
Democrats and Republicans have diverged on the seriousness of the threat posed by climate change, with Democrats' assessment rising significantly in the mid-2010s.

The sharp divide over the existence of and responsibility for global warming and climate change falls largely along political lines. Overall, 60% of Americans surveyed said oil and gas companies were "completely or mostly responsible" for climate change.

Opinion about human causation of climate change increased substantially with education among Democrats, but not among Republicans. Conversely, opinions favoring becoming carbon neutral declined substantially with age among Republicans, but not among Democrats.

Democrats believe the government should protect the environment and have a history of environmentalism. In more recent years, this stance has had as its emphasis alternative energy generation as the basis for an improved economy, greater national security, and general environmental benefits.

Democrats also favor expanding conservation lands and encourage open space and rail travel to relieve highway and airport congestion and improve air quality and the economy. They believe that communities, environmental interests, and government should work together to protect resources while ensuring the vitality of local economies, and that choosing between the economy and the environment is a false choice.

The Democratic Party's foremost environmental concern is climate change. Democrats, most notably former Vice President Al Gore, have pressed for stern regulation of greenhouse gases. On October 15, 2007, Gore won the Nobel Peace Prize for his efforts to build greater knowledge about man-made climate change and laying the foundations for the measures needed to counteract it. A 2017 analysis by the Center for American Progress Action Fund of climate change denial in the U.S. Congress found that 180 members deny the science behind climate change, all Republicans, and that no Democratic members of Congress publicly denied climate change.

=== Renewable energy and fossil fuels ===
Democrats support increased domestic renewable energy development, including wind and solar power farms, to reduce carbon dioxide emissions. The party's 2012 platform calls for an "all of the above" energy policy that includes clean energy, natural gas, and domestic oil, while seeking energy independence. The party has supported higher taxes on oil companies and increased regulations on coal power plants, favoring a policy to reduce long-term reliance on fossil fuels. In addition, the party supports stricter fuel emissions standards to prevent air pollution.

=== Trade agreements ===
The Democratic Party has held widely varying views on trade throughout its history. The 2020 Democratic Party platform supports fair and free trade, such as the USMCA, but opposes offshoring, dumping, and intellectual property theft, among other unfair trade practices.

== Social issues ==
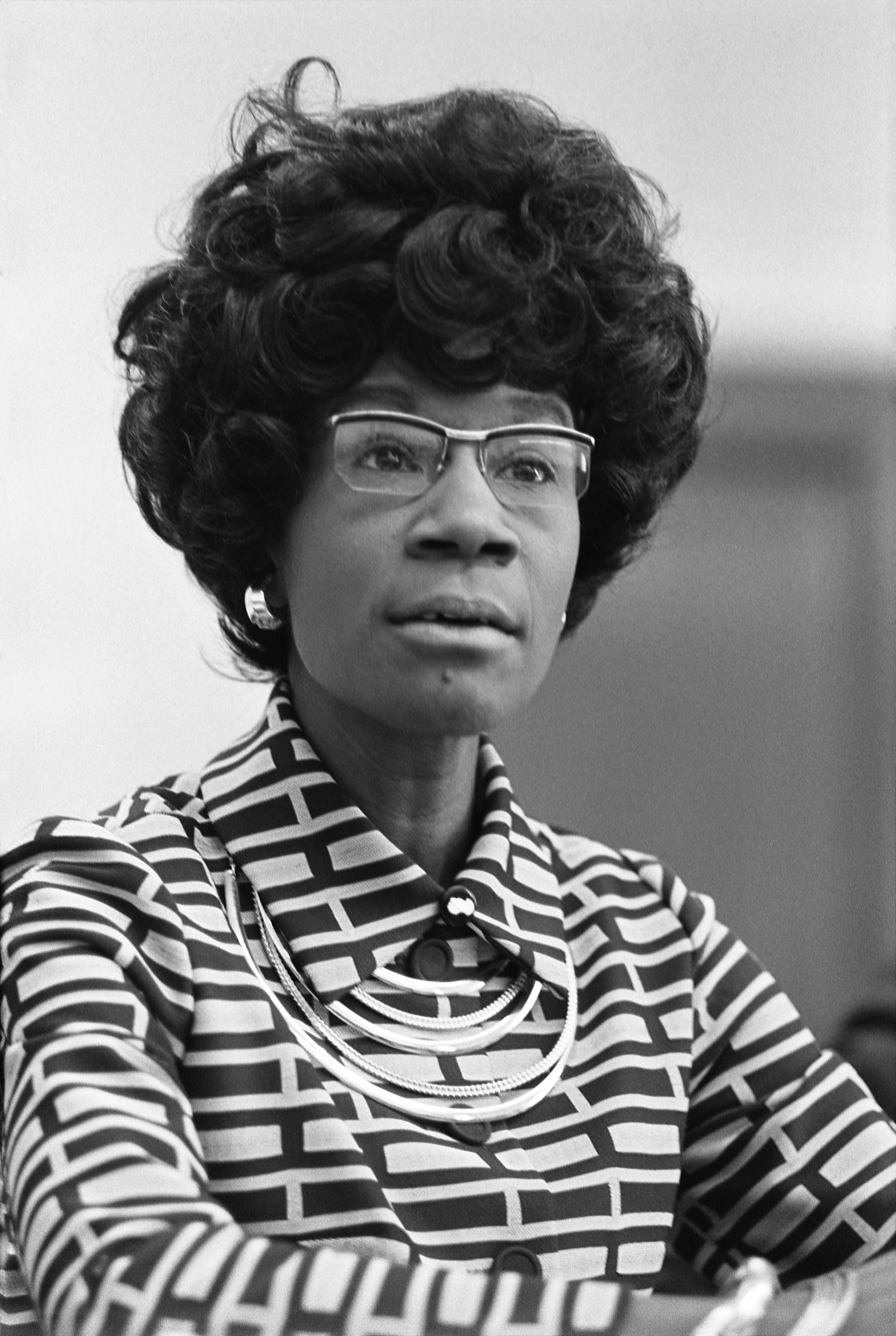
Shirley Chisholm was the first major party African-American candidate to run nationwide primary campaigns.

The modern Democratic Party emphasizes social equality and equal opportunity. Democrats support voting rights and minority rights, including LGBT rights. The Republican party passed the Civil Rights Act of 1964 after a Democratic attempt to filibuster led by Southern Democrats, which for the first time outlawed segregation. Edward Carmines and James Stimson wrote, "the Democratic Party appropriated racial liberalism and assumed federal responsibility for ending racial discrimination".

Ideological social elements in the party include cultural liberalism, civil libertarianism, and feminism. Some Democratic social policies are immigration reform, electoral reform, and women's reproductive rights.

=== Equal Opportunity ===
Democratic Party strives for equality of opportunity for all Americans, regardless of sex, age, race, ethnicity, sexual orientation, gender identity, religion, creed, or national origin. Many Democrats support affirmative action programs to further this goal. Democrats also strongly support the Americans with Disabilities Act, to prohibit discrimination against people based on physical or mental disability. As such, they pushed the ADA Amendments Act of 2008, a disability-rights expansion that became law.

=== Voting rights ===
The 2012 Democratic Party platform believes that the right to vote and to have one's vote counted is an essential American freedom, and opposes laws placing unnecessary restrictions on those seeking to exercise that freedom, such as voter ID laws. Many Democrats also support automatic voter registration, which ensures that all Americans over the legal voting age are registered to vote upon reaching the aforementioned age, and are never required to re-register.

=== Abortion and reproductive rights ===
The 2020 Democratic Party platform supports safe and legal abortion (this was about 2 years before Dobbs v. Jackson Women's Health Organization), and a woman's decision to have a child by providing affordable health care and ensuring the availability of, and access to, programs helping women during pregnancy and after a child's birth, including caring adoption programs, along with opposing any and all efforts to weaken or undermine that right.

=== Immigration ===
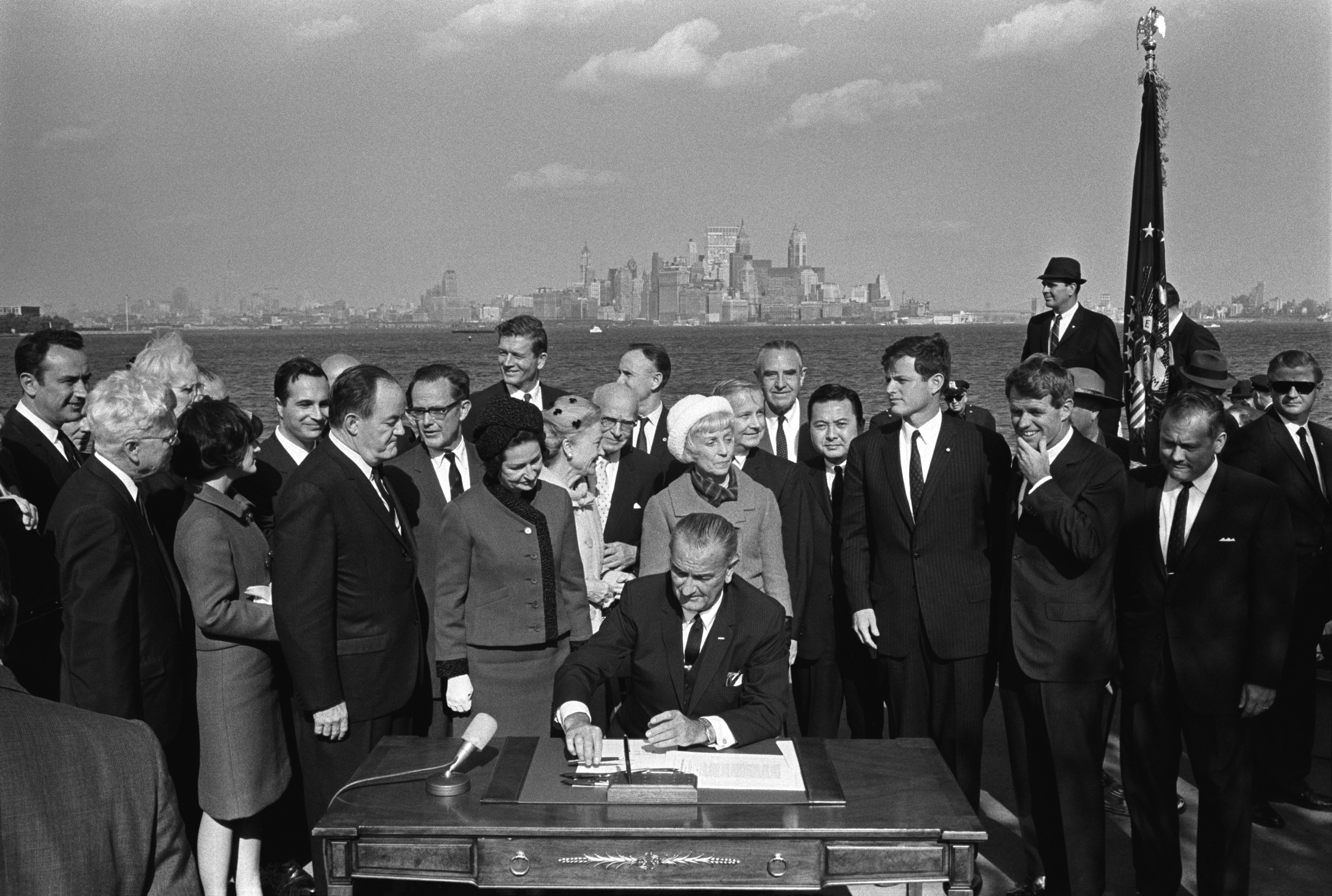
President Lyndon B. Johnson signs the Immigration Act of 1965, as Sen. Edward Kennedy, Sen. Robert Kennedy, and others look on.

The 2012 Democratic Party platform endorses enacting comprehensive immigration reform, supporting American economic goals and reflecting America's values as both a nation of laws and a nation of immigrants. They generally support an easier path toward citizenship for immigrants, a system for allocating visas meeting economic needs, keeping families together, and enforcing the law. The party supported the immigration policy of the Obama administration, the DREAM Act, the Deferred Action for Childhood Arrivals program, and opposes state laws targeting immigrants. Democrats are generally more sympathetic to sanctuary cities.

=== LGBT rights ===
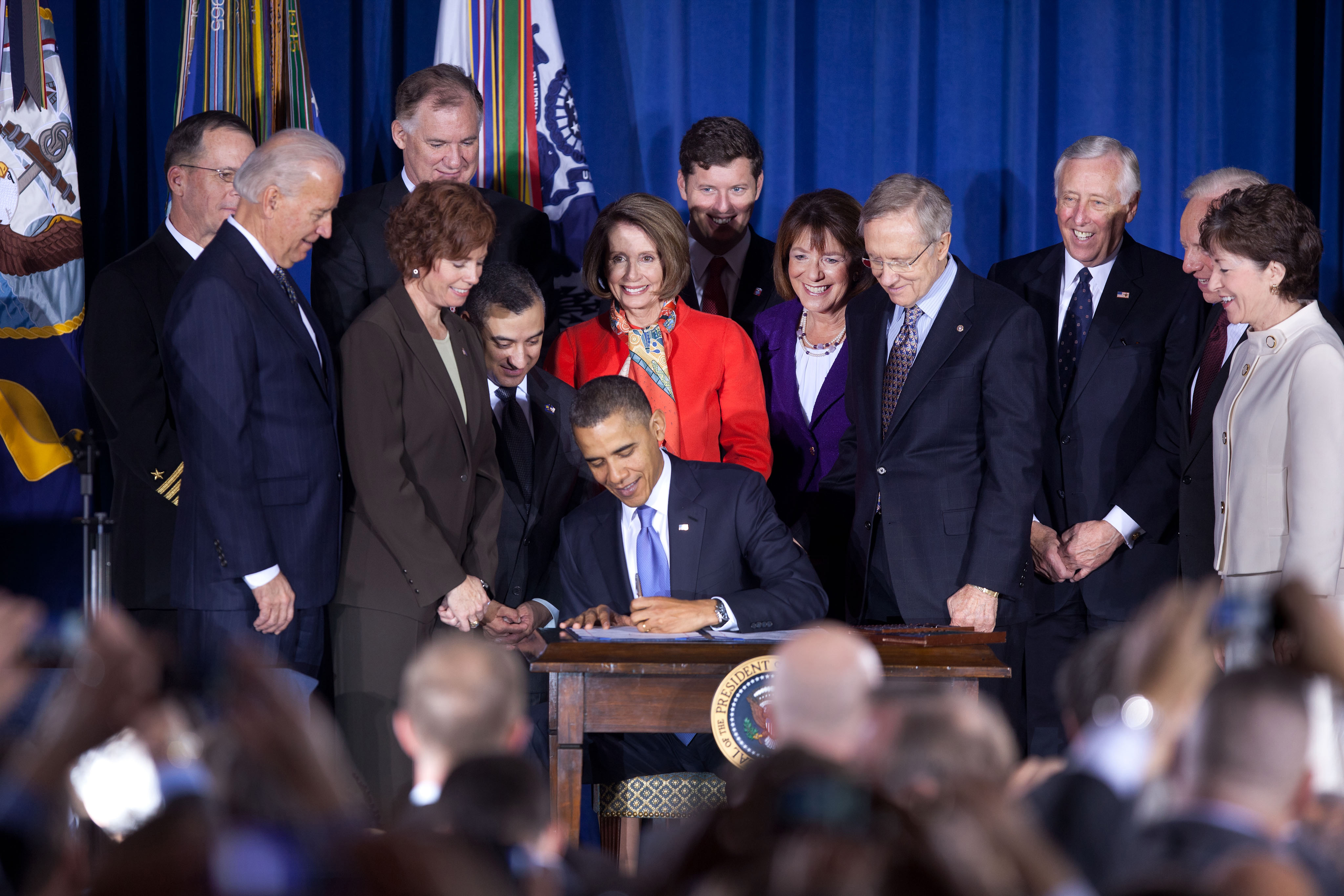
President Barack Obama meeting with the Joint Chiefs of Staff on the eve of publication of a Defense Department report on repeal of Don't Ask Don't Tell policy, which prohibit openly gay individuals to serve in the military

The 2020 Democratic Party platform endorsed the principle that no one should face discrimination based on their gender identity and sexual orientation. It supports the Equality Act (United States), anti-bullying prevention for LGBT youth, the Don't Ask, Don't Tell Repeal Act of 2010, and the Matthew Shepard and James Byrd Jr. Hate Crimes Prevention Act. Democrats also support marriage equality, and the Respect for Marriage Act.

The party also opposes discriminatory federal and state constitutional laws, and other attempts to deny equal protection of the laws to committed same-sex couples seeking the rights as other married couples, and efforts by other nations criminalizing homosexual conduct or ignoring abuse.

== Legal issues ==
=== Gun control ===
U.S. opinion on gun control issues is deeply divided along political lines, as shown in this 2021 survey.

With a stated goal of reducing crime and homicide, the Democratic Party has introduced various gun control measures, most notably the Gun Control Act of 1968, the Brady Bill of 1993, and Violent Crime Control and Law Enforcement Act (1994). However, some Democrats, especially rural, Southern, and Western Democrats, favor fewer restrictions on firearm possession and warned that the party was defeated in the 2000 presidential election in rural areas because of the issue. In the national platform for 2008, the only statement explicitly favoring gun control was a plan calling for renewal of the 1994 Assault Weapons Ban.

=== Death penalty ===
The Democratic Party currently opposes the death penalty, but previously supported it. The 2012 Democratic Party platform endorsed the death penalty, but believed it must not be arbitrary, DNA testing should be used in all appropriate circumstances, defendants should have effective assistance of counsel, and the administration of justice should be fair and impartial. Starting from the 2016 platform, the party formally supported abolishing the death penalty, stating that it is a cruel and unusual punishment, and that it does not deter crime.

The 2024 platform is the first since 2004 that does not mention the death penalty, and the first since 2016 not to call for its abolition.

=== Torture ===
Many Democrats are opposed to the use of torture against individuals apprehended and held prisoner by the U.S. military, and hold that categorizing such prisoners as unlawful combatants does not release the U.S. from its obligations under the Geneva Conventions. Democrats contend that torture is inhumane, decreases the United States' moral standing in the world, and produces questionable results.

Torture became a very divisive issue in the party after Barack Obama was elected president. Many centrist Democrats and members of the party's leadership supported the use of torture while the more left-leaning wings continued to be steadfastly opposed to it.

=== Right to privacy ===
The Democratic Party believes that individuals should have a right to privacy. For example, many Democrats have opposed the NSA warrantless surveillance of U.S. citizens.

Some Democratic officeholders have championed consumer protection laws that limit the sharing of consumer data between corporations. Democrats oppose "sodomy laws" and believe that government should not regulate consensual noncommercial sexual conduct among adults as a matter of personal privacy.

==== Patriot Act ====
Many Democrats are opposed to the Patriot Act. However, when the law was passed most Democrats were supportive of it and all but two Democrats in the U.S. Senate voted for the original legislation in 2001. The lone nay vote was from Russ Feingold of Wisconsin; Mary Landrieu of Louisiana did not vote. In the House, the Democrats voted for the Act by a margin of 145–62. Democrats split on the issue of the Act's renewal in 2006. In the Senate, 34 Democrats voted for the 2006 renewal, and 9 against. In the House, 66 Democrats voted for the renewal, and 124 against.

==== Puerto Rico and Washington DC Statehood ====
On January 31, 2025, the Democratic Party of the United States approved by voice vote, and for the first time, a resolution urging Congress to admit Puerto Rico and Washington D.C. as the 51st and 52nd states.

== Foreign policy issues ==
In foreign policy, the voters of the two major parties have largely overlapped since the 1990s. The Gallup poll in early 2013 shows broad agreement on the top issues, albeit with some divergence regarding as human rights and international cooperation through agencies such as the UN.

In June 2014 the Quinnipiac Poll asked Americans which foreign policy they preferred:

A) The United States is doing too much in other countries around the world, and it is time to do less around the world and focus more on our own problems here at home. B) The United States must continue to push forward to promote democracy and freedom in other countries around the world because these efforts make our own country more secure.

Democrats chose A over B by 65% to 32%; Republicans chose A over B by 56% to 39%; independents chose A over B by 67% to 29%.

=== Iraq War ===
In 2002, Congressional Democrats were divided on the Authorization for Use of Military Force Against Iraq; 147 voted against it (21 in the Senate and 126 in the House) and 110 voted for it (29 in the Senate, 81 in the House). Since then, many prominent Democrats, have expressed regret about this decision and called it a mistake, while others criticized the conduct of the war but did not repudiate their initial vote for it. Referring to Iraq in April 2007, then-Senate Majority Leader Harry Reid declared the war to be "lost" while other Democrats (especially during the 2004 presidential election cycle) accused President Bush of lying to the public about WMDs in Iraq. Among lawmakers, Democrats are the most vocal opponents of Operation Iraqi Freedom and campaigned on a platform of withdrawal ahead of the 2008 elections.

A March 2003 CBS News poll taken a few days before the invasion of Iraq found that 34% of Democrats nationwide would support it without United Nations backing, 51% would support it only with its backing, and 14% would not support it at all. The Los Angeles Times stated in early April 2003 that 70% of Democrats supported the decision to invade while 27% opposed it. The Pew Research Center stated in August 2007 that opposition increased from 37% during the initial invasion to 74%. In April 2008, a CBS News poll found that about 90% of Democrats disapproved of the Bush administration's conduct and want to end the war within the next year.

Democrats in the House of Representatives near-unanimously supported a non-binding resolution disapproving of President Bush's decision to send additional troops into Iraq in 2007. Congressional Democrats overwhelmingly supported military funding legislation that included a provision that set "a timeline for the withdrawal of all US combat troops from Iraq" by March 31, 2008, but also would leave combat forces in Iraq for purposes such as targeted counter-terrorism operations. After a veto from the president, and a failed attempt in Congress to override the veto, the U.S. Troop Readiness, Veterans' Care, Katrina Recovery, and Iraq Accountability Appropriations Act, 2007 was passed by Congress and signed by the president after the timetable was dropped. Criticism of the Iraq War subsided after the Iraq War troop surge of 2007 led to a dramatic decrease in Iraqi violence. The Democratic-controlled 110th Congress continued to fund efforts in both Iraq and Afghanistan. Presidential candidate Barack Obama advocated a withdrawal of combat troops within Iraq by late 2010 with a residual force of peacekeeping troops left in place. He stated that both the speed of withdrawal and the number of troops left over would be "entirely conditions-based."

On February 27, 2009, President Obama announced, "As a candidate for president, I made clear my support for a timeline of 16 months to carry out this drawdown, while pledging to consult closely with our military commanders upon taking office to ensure that we preserve the gains we've made and protect our troops ... Those consultations are now complete, and I have chosen a timeline that will remove our combat brigades over the next 18 months." Around 50,000 non-combat related forces will remain. Obama's plan drew wide bipartisan support, including that of defeated Republican presidential candidate Senator John McCain.

=== Iran sanctions ===
The Democratic Party has been critical of Iran's nuclear weapon program and supported economic sanctions against the Iranian government. In 2013, the Democratic led administration worked to reach a diplomatic agreement with the government of Iran to halt the Iranian nuclear weapon program in exchange for international economic sanction relief. As of 2014 negotiations had been successful and the party called for more cooperation with Iran in the future. In 2015, the Obama administration agreed to the Joint Comprehensive Plan of Action, which provides sanction relief in exchange for international oversight of the Iranian nuclear program.

=== Invasion of Afghanistan ===
Democrats in the House of Representatives and in the Senate near-unanimously voted for the Authorization for Use of Military Force Against Terrorists against "those responsible for the recent attacks launched against the United States" in Afghanistan in 2001, supporting the NATO coalition invasion of the nation. Most elected Democrats continue to support the Afghanistan conflict, and some, such as a Democratic National Committee spokesperson, have voiced concerns that the Iraq War shifted too many resources away from the presence in Afghanistan. During their presidential campaigns both Democratic candidate Barack Obama and Republican candidate John McCain called for a "surge" of troops into Afghanistan.

Support for the war among the American people diminished over time, and many Democrats began to support an end to the conflict. In July 2008, Gallup found that 41% of Democrats called the invasion a "mistake" while a 55% majority disagreed; in contrast, Republicans were more supportive of the war. The survey described Democrats as evenly divided about whether or not more troops should be sent—56% support it if it would mean removing troops from Iraq and only 47% support it otherwise. A CNN survey in August 2009 stated that a majority of Democrats now oppose the war. CNN polling director Keating Holland said, "Nearly two thirds of Republicans support the war in Afghanistan. Three quarters of Democrats oppose the war." An August 2009 Washington Post poll found similar results, and the paper stated that Obama's policies would anger his closest supporters.

During the 2020 Presidential Election, then-candidate Joe Biden promised to "end the forever wars in Afghanistan and the Middle East." Biden went on to win the election, and in April 2021, he announced he would withdraw all US troops from Afghanistan by September 11 of that year. The last troops left in August, bringing America's 20-year-long military campaign in the country to a close.

=== Israel and Palestine ===
Democrats have historically been stronger supporters of Israel than Republicans. During the 1940s, the party advocated for the cause of an independent Jewish state over the objections of many conservatives in the Old Right, who strongly opposed it. In 1948, Democratic President Harry Truman became the first world leader to recognize an independent state of Israel.

The 2012 Democratic Party platform endorses maintaining commitment to Israel's security, claiming a strong and secure Israel is vital because of strategic interests and common values, the Obama administration providing nearly $10 billion to Israel in the past three years, military support for Israel, such as the Iron Dome system, the Egypt–Israel peace treaty, the Israel–Jordan peace treaty, and recognizing Jerusalem as and remains the capital of Israel, and opposes any attempt to delegitimize Israel on the world stage. The platform also states that the Democratic Party seeks peace between Israelis and Palestinians, and supports a two-state solution, under conditions that Israel's security concerns are met and any Palestinian partner must recognize Israel's right to exist, reject violence, and adhere to existing agreements.

The 2020 Democratic Party platform acknowledges a "commitment to Israel's security, its qualitative military edge, its right to defend itself, and the 2016 Memorandum of Understanding is ironclad" and that "we oppose any effort to unfairly single out and delegitimize Israel, including at the United Nations or through the Boycott, Divestment, and Sanctions Movement". During the Gaza war, the party requested a large-scale military aid package to Israel. Biden also announced military support for Israel, condemned the actions of Hamas and other Palestinian militants as terrorism, and ordered the U.S. military to build a port to facilitate the arrival of humanitarian aid to Palestinian civilians in Gaza. However, parts of the Democratic base also became more skeptical of the Israel government. The number of Democrats (and Americans in general) who oppose sending arms to Israel has grown as Israel's war in Gaza has continued. Experts said support for Israel could have hurt Democrats in several key states, including Michigan and Pennsylvania, in the 2024 presidential election.

Late in 2024, twenty Democratic lawmakers requested support for U.S. legislation that would ban arms trade with countries that hinder humanitarian aid. According to a Pew Research Center poll conducted in March 2025, 69% of Democrats have an unfavorable view of Israel, compared to 53% in 2022, before the Gaza war. By July 2025, about half of the Democratic Senate delegation was opposed to sending arms to Israel.

== See also ==
Democratic Party

- Factions in the Democratic Party (United States)
- History of the Democratic Party (United States)

United States politics

- Political positions of the Republican Party (United States)
