= Incidents of objects being thrown at politicians =

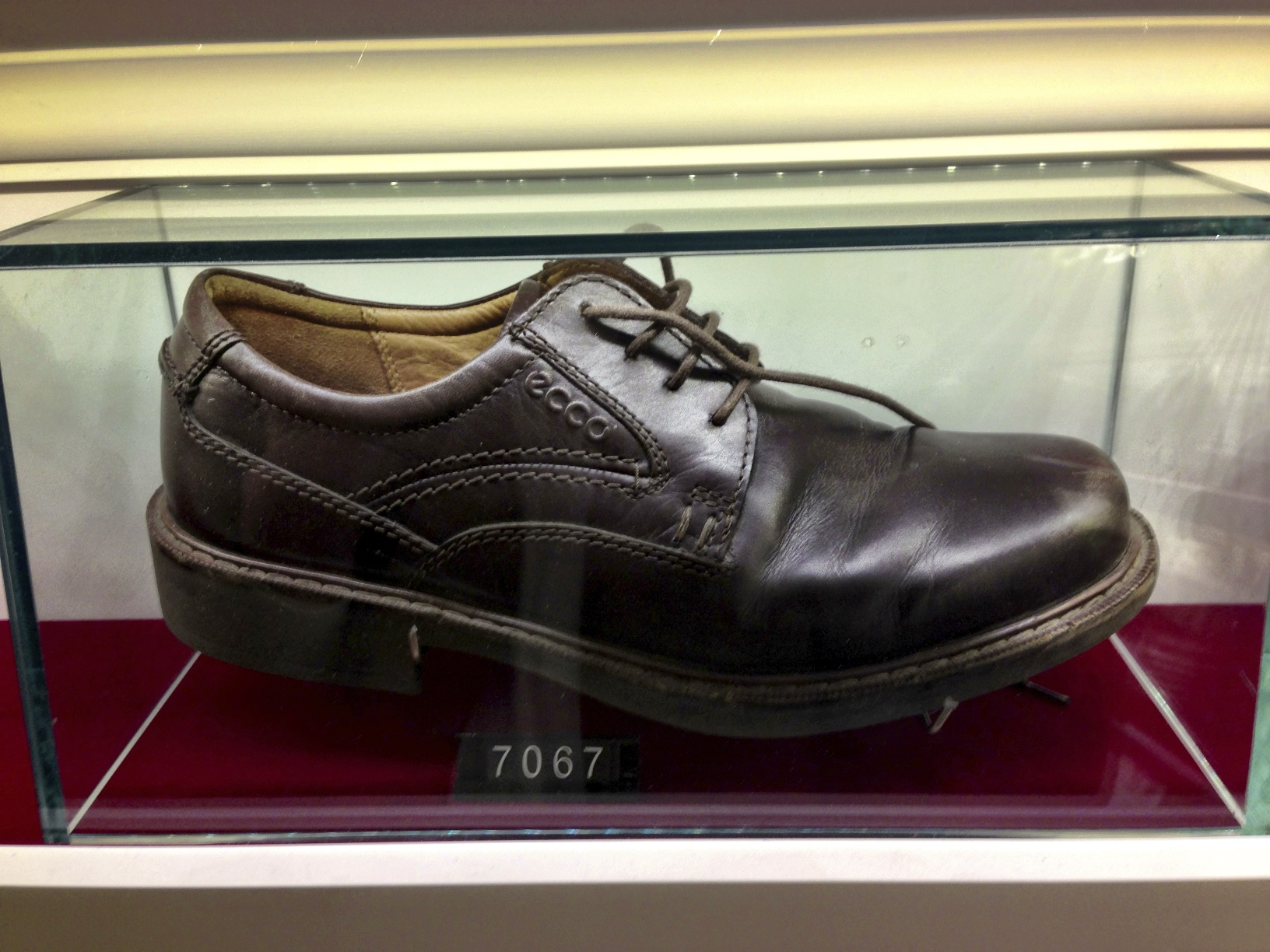
Replica of the shoe thrown at U.S. president George W. Bush during a speech in Iraq

In various countries, objects have been thrown at politicians for reasons varying from comedic to harmful. This article lists incidents in which objects have been thrown at politicians. The incidents are sorted by country of origin of the targeted politician.

== Albania ==
- On 2 November 2015, student protestors threw eggs at Prime Minister Edi Rama as he was exiting the Faculty of Social Sciences of the University of Tirana.
- On 19 February 2019, Prime Minister Edi Rama had ink thrown at him by former opposition lawmaker Edi Paloka during a session of the Albanian parliament.
- On 30 July 2024, Prime Minister Edi Rama had a bottle thrown at him by opposition lawmaker Albana Vokshi during a session of the Albanian parliament. The bottle was caught by a guard and did not hit.
- On 20 July 2026, protesters threw eggs at the cars of Interior Minister Bledar Çuçi and Minister of Education Mirela Kumbaro. The eggs had the names of lawmakers and Prime Minister Rama on them.

== Argentina ==
- On 27 August 2025, protestors pelted the vehicle of President Javier Milei and General Secretary of the Presidency Karina Milei with small rocks, bottles and other objects during a campaign rally in Lomas de Zamora, Buenos Aires Province, ahead of that year's midterm elections. While none of the objects hit, the rally was cut short.

== Australia ==
- On November 29, 1917, Prime Minister Billy Hughes had an egg thrown at him at the Warwick railway station in Queensland.
- On March 11, 1993, Liberal leader John Hewson was pelted with eggs, soft drink cans, apples, tomatoes and broccoli during a rally in front of Brisbane city hall, with Hewson catching one of the eggs.
- On October 25, 2010, two shoes were thrown at John Howard, former Prime Minister, by Peter Gray, live on the ABC Television program Q&A while Howard was defending his decision to commit Australian troops to the 2003 invasion of Iraq.
- On November 4, 2010, John Howard was delivering a speech about leadership in the new century at the University of Cambridge when an Australian student called him a racist before taking off his boot and throwing it in his direction.
- On June 14, 2015, David Sprigg threw his shoes at Australian Immigration Minister Peter Dutton in Brisbane, later saying, "I think he should be ashamed for what his government is doing and how asylum seekers are being treated in detention centres. When they use language like 'queue jumpers' and 'illegal arrivals', I think they're really just turning the public against refugees."
- On March 16, 2019, Senator Fraser Anning had an egg cracked on the back of his head by a teenager due to him blaming Muslim immigrants for the Christchurch mosque shootings.
- On May 6, 2019, a woman attempted to egg Prime Minister Scott Morrison while he was campaigning for the 2019 election, but it bounced off his head.

== Belgium ==
- On June 17, 2013, State Secretary for Asylum and Migration Maggie De Block was hit in the face with plates carrying whipped cream and ketchup by two activists. They responded to her immigration policy labeling it "fascist, destructive and inhumane".
- On December 22, 2014, Prime Minister Charles Michel was attacked with French fries and mayonnaise by two masked members of Lilith, an international feminist activist group. They were protesting financial cuts. A packet of French fries was first thrown over the prime minister and was immediately followed by several squirts of mayo.

== Cambodia ==
- On 11 May 2022, a man threw a shoe at Prime Minister Hun Sen during a visit by the latter to Washington, D.C., United States.

== Canada ==
- On June 3, 1976, former Minister of Agriculture Eugene Whelan was hit on the head with a milk jug during a demonstration by dairy farmers.
- On August 20, 1982, rocks, eggs, and tomatoes were thrown on a train that then-Prime Minister Pierre Trudeau was riding on, resulting in a broken window.
- On May 7, 1999, former Liberal Party leader Stéphane Dion was hit by a pie.
- On August 16, 2000, then-Prime Minister Jean Chrétien was pied in Charlottetown by a member of the PEI Pie Brigade.
- On October 5, 2000, Canadian Alliance leader Stockwell Day was hit with chocolate milk in Kitchener.
- On April 12, 2003, former Quebec Premier Jean Charest had two pies thrown at him during an election campaign.
- On July 5, 2003, Alberta Premier Ralph Klein was hit in the face with a banana cream pie at the Calgary Stampede.
- On July 25, 2010, Klein's successor, Ed Stelmach, was targeted in a pieing incident, but a member of his security detail took the pie for him.
- On January 25, 2010, Fisheries Minister Gail Shea was pied by someone protesting the seal hunt.
- On June 15, 2013, a cup of juice was thrown in the face of then-Toronto Mayor Rob Ford at the Taste of Little Italy festival.
- On September 27, 2019, an egg was thrown at Prime Minister Justin Trudeau at the Montreal Climate Strike.
- On September 2, 2021, an egg was thrown at People's Party of Canada leader Maxime Bernier during a campaign event in Saskatoon.
- On September 6, 2021, Prime Minister Justin Trudeau had gravel thrown at him while he boarded his campaign bus after a rally.
- On September 21, 2024, a man was arrested after he allegedly threw a brick at Alain Talbot, mayor of Saint-Paul-de-Montminy, Quebec, as he sat in his car.

== China ==
- On 2 February 2009, Premier Wen Jiabao had a shoe thrown at him by a German student while giving a lecture at the University of Cambridge. The shoe did not hit Wen.

== Czech Republic ==
- On 17 November 2014, President Miloš Zeman had various objects, including eggs, sandwiches and tomatoes, thrown at him by protestors during a ceremony to commemorate the 25th anniversary of the Velvet Revolution. German President Joachim Gauck, who was also present at the ceremony along with the presidents of Hungary, Poland, and Slovakia, was also hit in the head by an egg during the incident.

== Denmark ==
- On 18 March 2003, activists threw red paint at Prime Minister Anders Fogh Rasmussen and Foreign Minister Per Stig Møller, after a meeting of the Foreign Policy Committee of the Folketing. The action was a protest against Denmark's support and participation in the 2003 invasion of Iraq, and led to increased security measures in the Folketing.

== Finland ==
- On 30 November 2015, Finance Minister Alexander Stubb had a soft drink thrown in his face during a meet-and-greet in Tampere.

== France ==
- On February 1, 2012, François Hollande was flour bombed while campaigning for the presidential election in protest of the Socialist Party.
- On June 6, 2016, Economy Minister and later President Emmanuel Macron was egged by General Confederation of Labour activists protesting labor reforms.
- On December 22, 2016, former Prime Minister Manuel Valls was flour bombed after announcing that he was running in the presidential election in protest of his multiple uses of Article 49.
- On April 6, 2017, former Prime Minister François Fillon was flour bombed at a campaign rally in protest of his corruption.
- On May 4, 2017, while campaigning in Dol-de-Bretagne, Marine le Pen was almost hit by an egg by about 50 protesters shouting "Out with fascists". The egg missed le Pen's head. Security immediately shielded Ms le Pen and she was unharmed.
- On September 27, 2021, President Emmanuel Macron was hit on the shoulder by an egg during a food trade fair in Lyon.
- On March 12, 2022, an egg was cracked on far-right presidential candidate Éric Zemmour's head while he was campaigning in Moissac.
- On April 27, 2022, a tomato missed President Emmanuel Macron during a visit to Cergy.
- On June 4, 2022, eggs were thrown again at Marine le Pen while she was campaigning for the legislative elections. Insults were also thrown at her during her visit to Saint Amand les Eaux. Ms le Pen was quickly escorted by her bodyguards and was unharmed.
- On 1 March, 2024, eggs were thrown at Agriculture Minister Marc Fesneau and Ecological Transition Minister Christophe Béchu by protesting farmers, as the two were attending the Paris International Agricultural Show.
- On November 25, 2025, a teenager threw flour at National Rally leader Jordan Bardella in Vesoul.
- On November 29, 2025, a 74-year-old man was arrested for throwing an egg at Jordan Bardella in Moissac.

== Georgia ==
- On 17 February, 2025, a groups of individuals egged Giorgi Gakharia, former Prime Minister and leader of For Georgia, and Elguja Khokrishvili, ambassador to Germany, at the Tbilisi International Airport upon their return from the 61st Munich Security Conference. The following day, ex-President Salome Zourabichvili also had eggs thrown at her at the airport as she returned from Munich.

== Germany ==
- On 10 May 1991, protestors threw eggs, tomatoes, and paint at Chancellor Helmut Kohl during a visit to Halle in eastern Germany.
- On 29 August, 2024, a man threw paint at Sahra Wagenknecht, leader of the Sahra Wagenknecht Alliance, during a press conference in Thuringia. Wagenknecht was not hit by the paint.
- On 9 January, 2025, a woman threw a foam cake at leader of the Free Democratic Party (FDP) and former Finance Minister Christian Lindner.

== Greece ==
- Since the 1950s protesters have thrown yogurt, referred to as "yaourtoma", at politicians and in 1958 doing so was criminalized until 1983. Alekos Alavanos, Liana Kanelli, and Haris Kastanidis have had yogurt thrown at them.

== Guatemala ==
- Vice President Roxana Baldetti was covered in flour after a speech in Guatemala City in 2014.

== Honduras ==
- On January 8, 2026, a home made explosive was thrown at conservative lawmaker Gladis Aurora López Calderón at the legislative building. López Calderón's jacket was damaged, but she only suffered minor injuries.

== Hong Kong ==
- In 2008, Hong Kong politician Raymond Wong Yuk-man threw a bunch of bananas at Chief Executive Donald Tsang in protest of plans to introduce a means test for Old Age Allowance payments (colloquially known as "fruit money").
- In 2013, a protester threw a stuffed wolf toy at Leung Chun-ying, as both a criticism of his perceived cunningness, and as a pun on his name and the Chinese word for wolf (the translated name given to the stuffed toy by IKEA also sounds similar to a Cantonese profanity).
- People have also thrown dorayaki at lawmakers in the past, as an accusation of lying (the fictional character Doraemon uses dorayaki to get people to tell the truth).

== Iceland ==
- On 1 October 2010, protesters threw eggs and tomatoes at members of the Althing while they were walking between the Parliament House and the Reykjavík Cathedral.

== India ==
- On 6 October 2025, a shoe was thrown at Chief Justice of India B. R. Gavai at a temple in Khajuraho. The assailant was a lawyer who was reportedly upset over comments Gavai made about Hinduism.

== Ireland ==
- In April 2002, Fine Gael leader Michael Noonan was hit in the face with a custard pie while canvassing in Roscommon.
- In November 2010, health minister Mary Harney had red paint thrown at her by a city councillor from Dublin.
- In November 2012, protesters at University College Dublin threw eggs at Fine Gael leader and Taoiseach Enda Kenny, while he was attending the opening of a student centre in the college. The eggs missed Kenny.
- In September 2019, leader of the National Party Justin Barrett had a milkshake thrown at him in Eyre Square, Galway.
- In September 2020, Tánaiste and Fine Gael leader Leo Varadkar had a drink thrown at him by a woman in Merrion Park, Dublin.
- On January 4, 2023, a farmer threw two bags of cow dung at Teachtaí Dála Ciarán Cannon and Anne Rabbitte in Gort.

== Israel ==
- On April 23, 2025, National Security Minister Itamar Ben-Gvir had a water bottle thrown at him while visiting Yale University in New Haven, Connecticut, United States.

== Italy ==
- In 63, Vespasian, the Roman Governor of Africa, had turnips thrown at him.
- On 13 December 2009, a souvenir statuette of the Milan Cathedral was thrown by a man at Prime Minister Silvio Berlusconi as he greeted a crowd and signed autographs outside the cathedral, causing a broken nose and two broken teeth.

== Japan ==
- On April 15, 2023, a man threw a pipe bomb at Prime Minister Fumio Kishida during an event in Wakayama. The prime minister was unharmed.

== Kenya ==
- On May 4, 2025, a shoe was thrown at Kenyan President William Ruto during a rally in Migori.

== Netherlands ==
- On March 15, 2002, Dutch politician Pim Fortuyn had a cake thrown in his face during a book presentation in The Hague by an activist shouting "Up towards zero seats!" Fortuyn at the time was poised to win in large numbers at the upcoming national election. It is unknown what the cake was made of; claims that there were feces in it, were never proven. In the aftermath of the murder of Fortuyn, two months later, three people were arrested in connection to the cake incident.

== New Zealand ==
- Queen Elizabeth II was egged by two Māori protestors on February 24, 1986, while riding in an open car with Prince Philip.
- On February 6, 1990, Queen Elizabeth II was almost hit by a wet t-shirt during Waitangi Day ceremonies, thrown by Māori student Henearoahuea Tepou.
- On February 5, 2004, a handful of mud was thrown at New Zealand National Party leader Don Brash, hitting him in the face and upper chest. The thrower, later identified as Kevin Raymond Duncan, was charged with disorderly conduct. This charge was later withdrawn.
- Also on February 5, 2016, New Zealand MP and Minister of Economic Development Steven Joyce was struck with a thrown dildo in Waitangi. The act was in protest of the Trans-Pacific Partnership.

== Philippines ==
- on 12 March 1947, President Manuel Roxas narrowly escaped an assassination attempt where a hand grenade was thrown at him during a speech in Manila, exploding 30 feet away from him.

== Samoa ==
- On 14 November 2018, Prime Minister Tuilaʻepa Saʻilele Malielegaoi was verbally attacked by two men, one of whom also threw a pig's head at him, during a speaking engagement in Brisbane, Australia.

== Serbia ==
- On 11 July 2015, Prime Minister Aleksandar Vučić had stones and bottles thrown at him by a crowd during a commemoration of the Srebrenica massacre at the Srebrenica Genocide Memorial in Bosnia and Herzegovina.

== Spain ==
- On November 3, 2024, protesters threw mud and other objects at Spanish Prime Minister Pedro Sánchez, King Felipe VI, and Queen Letizia as they visited the town of Paiporta in Valencia following recent floods in the region.

== Sri Lanka ==
- On January 30, 2022, Leader of the Janatha Vimukthi Peramuna and National People's Power Anura Kumara Dissanayake's vehicle was egged by two men who are working for the Avant-garde Security Service which is running by President Gotabaya Rajapaksa's very close friend Nissanka Senadhipathi.

== St. Vincent and the Grenadines ==
- On August 5, 2021, a protester threw an unspecified object at Prime Minister Ralph Gonsalves during an anti-vaccine rally. Gonsalves suffered a concussion and was taken to a hospital for treatment. The protester was arrested at the scene.

== Sweden ==
- On March 7, 2001, Minister of Commerce Leif Pagrotsky and European Parliamentarian Marit Paulsen were attending a public meeting in Lund when two members of the Swedish Anarcho-syndicalist Youth Federation threw cakes at their necks as a claimed attempt to start a debate on a lack of democracy in the European Union.
- On April 17, 2001, Minister of Finance Bosse Ringholm had a cake thrown at his face by a protester during the traditional budget walk.
- On September 5, 2001, King Carl XVI Gustaf was visiting Getterön nature center when a 16-year old boy threw a cake in his face.
- On November 5, 2013, the Sweden Democrats leader Jimmie Åkesson had a cake thrown at him. The perpetrator was sentenced to 2 months in jail and fined 5000 kr for the crime of harassment.
- On August 18, 2014, Minister for Social Affairs Göran Hägglund was attending a public meeting on Kungsportsplatsen in Gothenburg when a 20-year old man threw a cake in his face as a claimed protest against homophobic policies of the Christian Democrats.
- On October 2, 2024, tomatoes were thrown at Foreign Minister Maria Malmer Stenergard by a protestor from a balcony in the Riksdag. The incident occurred during a debate in which Stenergard explained why Sweden had abstained from a United Nations vote regarding the Israeli occupation of the West Bank.

== Turkey ==
- On 22 February 2010, a man threw a shoe at Prime Minister Recep Tayyip Erdoğan during a visit to Seville, Spain, while shouting "Viva Kurdistan." The shoe missed Erdoğan, hitting his bodyguard instead.

== Ukraine ==
- On 24 September 2004, a student threw an egg at Prime Minister Viktor Yanukovych during a campaign visit to Ivano-Frankivsk ahead of that year's presidential election. The incident became subject of jokes due to Yanukovych's apparently over-the-top reaction, falling down as if seriously injured.

== United Kingdom ==
=== 1890s ===
- On 25 June 1892, during a visit to a campaign event in Chester ahead of the 1892 general election, a woman threw a gingerbread biscuit at Liberal Party leader William Ewart Gladstone. The biscuit struck Gladstone's left eye, inflicting a slight wound; Gladstone was already suffering from impaired vision at the time, and, according to historian Colin Matthew, the incident "marked the end of his ability to rely on his eyesight".

=== 1910s ===
- On 18 July 1912, English suffragette Mary Leigh threw a hatchet at British Prime Minister H. H. Asquith, as he was riding in an open carriage during a visit to Dublin. The hatchet missed Asquith but hit Irish nationalist leader John Redmond instead, injuring him.
- On 13 November 1912, Winston Churchill, at the time First Lord of the Admiralty, had a book thrown at him by the MP Ronald McNeill in the House of Commons, after a debate on home rule for Ireland. The book, a copy of the Standing Orders, struck Churchill's head, drawing blood.

=== 1970s ===
- On 1 June 1970, Prime Minister Harold Wilson was egged by a member of the Young Conservatives while campaigning for the 1970 general election.
- On 20 June 1970, newly elected Prime Minister Edward Heath had red paint thrown at him by a woman outside 10 Downing Street. House of Commons leader William Whitelaw, who was accompanying him, was also splashed with paint.
- On 22 January 1972, as he arrived at Egmont Palace in Brussels to sign the Treaty of Accession of the UK to the European Communities, Prime Minister Edward Heath was spattered with ink by a protestor.

=== 2000s ===
- On May 16, 2001, Deputy Prime Minister John Prescott was egged by a man before an election rally in Rhyl, Denbighshire in the run-up to the general elections of that year. Prescott responded immediately with a left-hand punch to the man's jaw, an incident that became known as the Prescott punch.
- In 2004, Prime Minister Tony Blair had purple-coloured powder thrown at him while debating in the House of Commons.
- In 2009, First Secretary of State Peter Mandelson had green custard thrown at him by Leila Deen, a member of Plane Stupid.

=== 2010s ===
- On 21 April 2010, a teenager threw an egg at Conservative Party leader David Cameron. The teenager was detained but was released once police determined he had no other missiles.
- In 2012 and 2013, Labour Party leader Ed Miliband had eggs thrown at him.
- An egg was thrown at Nigel Farage in 2017, but it hit his umbrella.
- In March 2019, Labour Party leader Jeremy Corbyn had an egg thrown at him.
- During the 2019 European Parliament election multiple politicians from the UK Independence Party and the Brexit Party, including Carl Benjamin, Nigel Farage, and Tommy Robinson, had milkshakes thrown at them.

=== 2020s ===
- In October 2023, a man was arrested for disrupting Keir Starmer's speech at the 2023 Labour Party Conference by spraying glitter on Starmer.
- In June 2024, a milkshake was thrown at Farage again, while campaigning for the 2024 United Kingdom general election.

== United States ==
=== 1840s ===
- In August 1842, President John Tyler, while walking on the South Lawn of the White House, had rocks thrown at him through the fence by an intoxicated painter.

=== 1910s ===
- On August 14, 1908, Eugene W. Chafin was giving a speech in Springfield, Illinois, when a lynch mob started a riot and while he was taking his handkerchief out from his pocket a member of the mob believed that he was pulling a gun out and threw a brick at him.
- A cabbage was thrown at William Howard Taft while campaigning by a heckler. Taft responded: "I see that one of my opponents has lost its head."

=== 1950s ===
- In 1958, Vice President Richard Nixon conducted a goodwill tour throughout multiple South American countries. Protesters in Lima, Peru threw eggs at his motorcade, and on May 13, 1958, his motorcade was attacked by protesters in Caracas, Venezuela in response to the United States's support for the recently deposed dictator Marcos Pérez Jiménez.

=== 1960s ===
- On October 28, 1960, Vice President Richard Nixon was egged in Muskegon and Jackson, Michigan, and had tomatoes thrown at him in Grand Rapids while campaigning in the 1960 presidential election.
- During a goodwill tour of several European countries in 1967, Vice President Hubert Humphrey had a rotten egg thrown at him in Florence, Italy on 1 April, and rotten eggs and fruits in Brussels, Belgium on 9 April, by anti-Vietnam War protestors. In the first incident, the egg missed, while in the second incident, several of the eggs and fruits hit Humphrey's car and bodyguards.

=== 1970s ===
- On November 8, 1979, Senator Ted Kennedy was traveling to a senior citizen's center in Chicago during his campaign for the 1980 Democratic Party presidential primaries and while doing so was being picketed by anti-abortion activists. Katie Moy, a member of the Communist Workers' Party, threw an egg at Kennedy in protest of the Greensboro massacre, but it only hit his shoulder before breaking on the ground.

=== 1990s ===
- In 1998, members of the Biotic Baking Brigade threw pies at San Francisco Mayor Willie Brown during a speech in protest of his policies on homelessness.

=== 2000s ===
- In 2000, a vegetarian activist threw a pie at Secretary of Agriculture Dan Glickman at the National Nutrition Summit in protest of his promotion of meat products.
- In 2000, Illinois Governor George Ryan was pied by a student from the Southern Illinois University Carbondale in protest of his education policies.
- In 2001, when exiting an antique store in Warsaw, Poland, former President Bill Clinton had an egg thrown at him by a protester.
- In 2003, former presidential candidate Ralph Nader was giving his endorsement to the Green Party's gubernatorial candidate, Peter Camejo, for the gubernatorial recall election in San Francisco and during his speech he was pied in the face by an unknown assailant.
- In 2003, Arnold Schwarzenegger was egged while campaigning for governor of California. He later made a quip about the incident, and described the action as part of free speech.
- On October 21, 2004, Ann Coulter was pied by Phillip Edgar Smith and William Zachary Wolff in the name of "Al Pieda" (a pun on Al Qaeda) while giving a speech at the University of Arizona.
- On March 30, 2005, Bill Kristol was pied by a student while giving a foreign policy speech at Earlham College. The student stated that they were "making a statement about what he called a mock dialog".
- On April 1, 2005, Pat Buchanan had salad dressing thrown onto him while speaking at Western Michigan University.
- On May 10, 2005, Vladimir Arutyunian threw a hand grenade at Georgian President Mikheil Saakashvili and President George W. Bush at Freedom Square in Tbilisi, Georgia, but the grenade did not detonate.
- On November 7, 2005, an individual threw a cup of ice cubes at California Governor Arnold Schwarzenegger in Chico, with several ice cubes landing on Schwarzenegger, who did not react. Shortly after, a woman crushed a muffin in her hand and threw it at Schwarzenegger.
- On July 4, 2008, Vermont Governor Jim Douglas was pied in the face by a man dressed as Santa Claus in protest of his energy policies.
- On December 14, 2008, journalist Muntadhar al-Zaidi threw his shoes at President George W. Bush during a press conference with Prime Minister Nouri al-Maliki in Baghdad, Iraq, but Bush ducked below both.
- In 2009, multiple eggs were thrown at Senator Norm Coleman by a man at his door, but all of them missed.
- In 2009, Jeremy Paul Olsen attempted to hit Governor Sarah Palin with two tomatoes from a second-floor balcony, but both missed.

=== 2010s ===
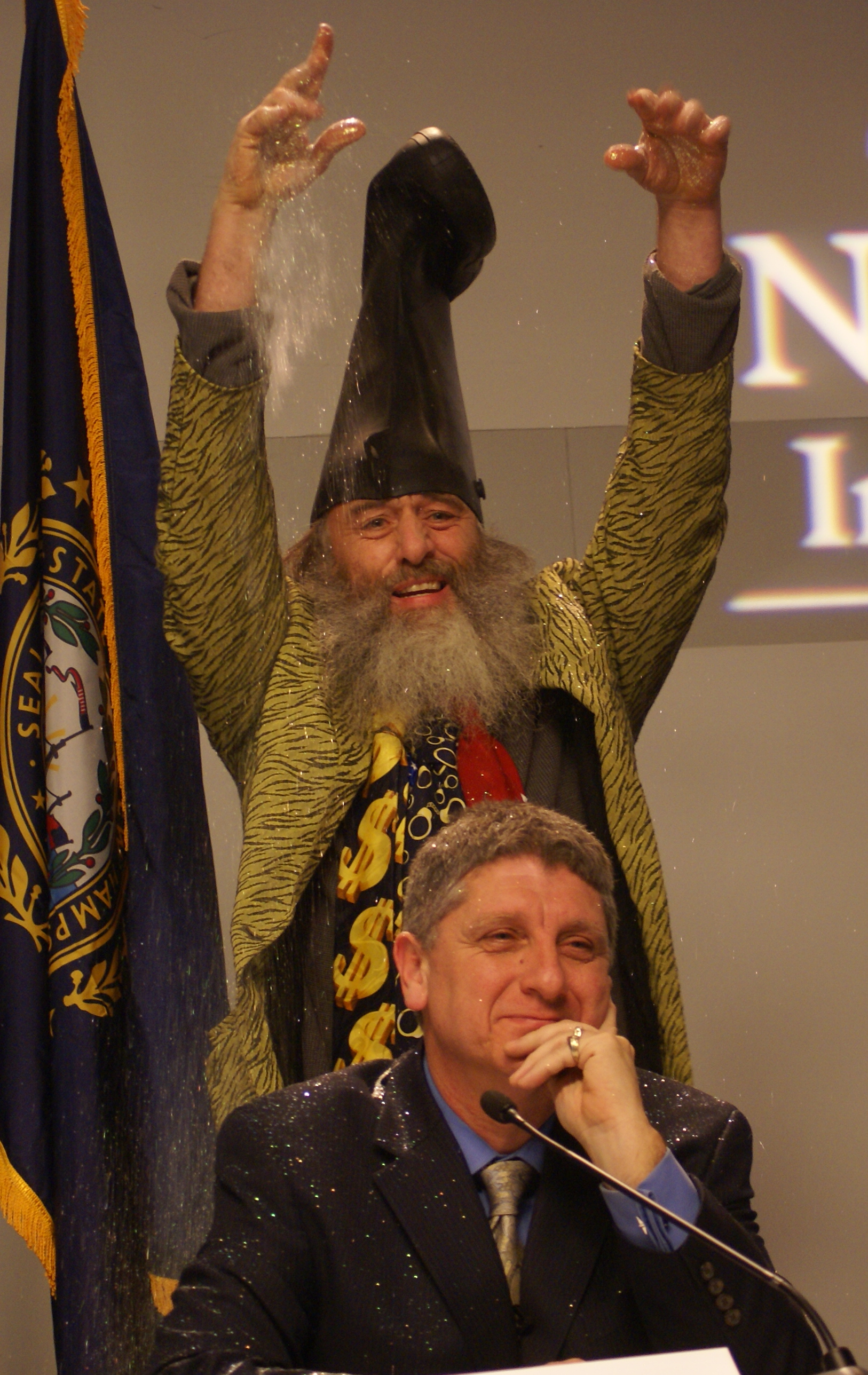
Vermin Supreme glitter bombs Randall Terry at Saint Anselm College.

- In 2010, a paperback book was thrown at President Barack Obama by the book's author hoping that the president would read it.
- On August 16, 2010, Senator Carl Levin, a Jewish member of Congress, was pied in the face by Ahlam Mohsem to "bring to light Sen[ator] Levin's war crimes" as a "Zionist".
- On May 17, 2011, Newt Gingrich and his wife Callista Gingrich were glitter bombed by Nick Espinosa who shouted "Stop the hate!" and "Feel the rainbow, Newt!"
- On June 16, 2011, former Minnesota Governor Tim Pawlenty was glitter bombed by members of Code Pink.
- On June 18, 2011, Representative Michele Bachmann was glitter bombed by Rachel E. B. Lang with the support of GetEQUAL and COLAGE due to Bachmann's support for You Can Run But You Cannot Hide International.
- On December 19, 2011, Randall Terry was glitter bombed by Vermin Supreme at the lesser-known candidates forum at Saint Anselm College.
- In 2012, Secretary of State Hillary Clinton's motorcade had tomatoes and shoes thrown at it in Alexandria, Egypt and there were shouts of "Monica, Monica" and "leave, Clinton".
- Former Senator Rick Santorum was glitter bombed by protesters five separate times in 2012.
- On February 6, 2012, Representative Ron Paul was glitter bombed by a protester who shouted "Housing and health care are human rights, not privileges!" while Paul was campaigning for the 2012 Republican Party presidential primaries.
- On February 1 and February 7, 2012, former Massachusetts Governor Mitt Romney was glitter bombed by protesters.
- In 2014 a woman threw her shoe at Hillary Clinton during a speaking tour in Las Vegas.
- On September 21, 2016, Kevin Johnson, the Mayor of Sacramento, was pied by Sean Thompson at a charity event. Johnson punched Thompson, who was later arrested on felony and misdemeanor charges.
- On February 17, 2017, a middle school student threw a block of wood at President Donald Trump's motorcade in Palm Beach, Florida.
- In February 2019 local activist Justin Jones threw a cup of coffee at Tennessee State Representative Glen Casada during a protest at the Tennessee State Capitol.
- On June 1, 2019, a woman threw a drink at Representative Matt Gaetz as he left a restaurant in Pensacola, Florida. The woman, who had previously run against Gaetz in the 2016 House election, was sentenced to 15 days in federal prison.

=== 2020s ===
- On June 17, 2021, a man threw a water bottle at California Governor Gavin Newsom in Downtown Oakland.
- On September 8, 2021, radio show host running for the governorship of California, Larry Elder was egged by a woman on a bike wearing a Gorilla mask in Venice, Los Angeles.
- On May 20, 2022, New York City Mayor Eric Adams had a protein drink can thrown at him, hitting one of his security guards.
- On November 7, 2022, a man was arrested for throwing a hard seltzer can at Senator Ted Cruz during a World Series parade in Downtown Houston, Texas.
- On April 29, 2023, a woman was arrested for allegedly throwing a drink at Matt Gaetz and another man during a wine festival in Miramar Beach, Florida. The woman claimed she tripped and spilled the drink on Gaetz.
- On May 23, 2023, a woman was arrested for allegedly throwing a brick at San Francisco Mayor London Breed during an open-air Board of Supervisors meeting.
- On September 16, 2024, protesters threw ping pong balls at Mayor Andre Dickens and other members of the Atlanta City Council. The balls had the number "116,000" written on them, representing the number of signatures petitioners had gathered against the construction of Cop City.
- On February 20, 2025, following a press conference by Transportation Secretary Sean Duffy, a protester threw a tomato at State Assemblywoman Alexandra Macedo.
- On January 27, 2026, a man was arrested for spraying apple cider at Representative Ilhan Omar during a press conference in Minneapolis. The man was charged with assault and interfering with a federal official.
- On November 10, 2026, protesters in Ireland threw objects at former U.S. President Joe Biden and First Lady Jill Biden as they left Trinity College Dublin. The two were visiting the college for a ceremony where their son Hunter Biden received the Gold Medal for Outstanding Contribution for Public Discourse. Gardaí officers arrested two people.

== Venezuela ==
- On 25 April 2015, President Nicolás Maduro was hit in the head by a mango with a message and a telephone number written on it during a visit to Aragua. In a later television appearance, Maduro displayed the fruit, stating that the woman who had thrown it had "a problem with her house", and that he had approved for an apartment to be given to her as part of the Great Housing Mission of Venezuela.

== See also ==
- Glitter bombing
- List of people who have been pied
- List of shoe-throwing incidents
- Pieing
