= Glitter bombing =

Throwing glitter on people in protest

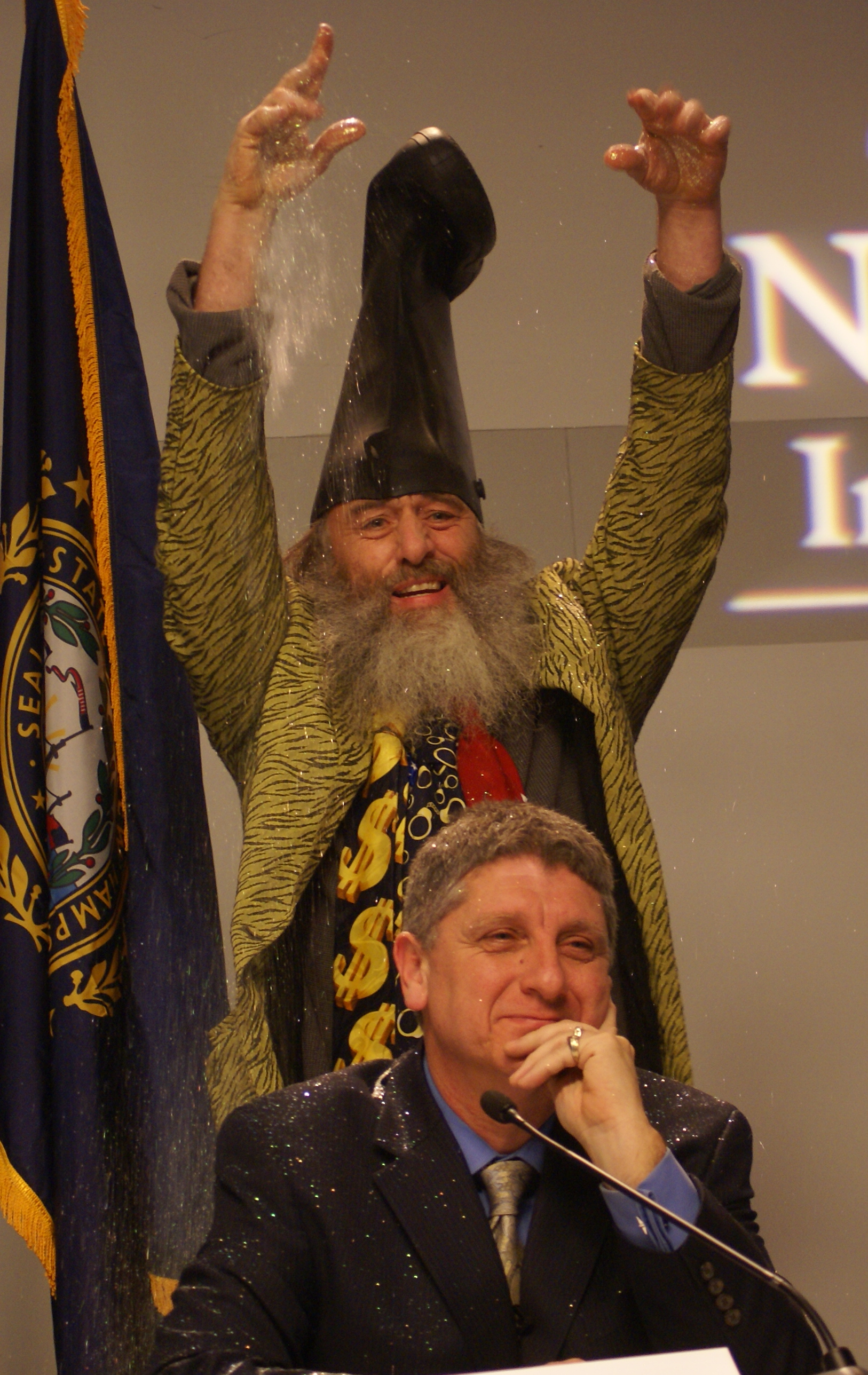
Vermin Supreme glitter bombs Randall Terry at Saint Anselm College.

Glitter bombing is an act of protest in which activists throw glitter on people at public events.

Some legal officials argue glitter bombing is assault and battery. It is possible for glitter to enter the eyes or nose and cause damage to the cornea or other soft tissues potentially irritating them or leading to infection, depending on the size of the glitter. Whether a prosecutor would pursue the charges depends on a number of factors.

In recent years, the practice of glitter bombing has evolved to include the act of sending large quantities of glitter in the mail, either as a prank or to deter mail thieves.

== Notable incidents ==
Recipient	Date	Location	Details
Newt Gingrich	May 17, 2011	Minneapolis, Minnesota	The former Speaker of the House of Representatives and his wife Callista were showered with glitter at a book signing. Nick Espinosa dumped a full box of glitter on them, shouting "Stop the hate!" and "Feel the rainbow, Newt!"
Tim Pawlenty	June 16, 2011	San Francisco, California	Pawlenty, the former governor of Minnesota, was showered with glitter and pink feathers by Nancy Mancias and Chelsea Byers, two members of the anti-war coalition CODEPINK. He was targeted at a book signing in San Francisco, with the perpetrators stating that Pawlenty's "homophobic attitude" and opposition to recognition of same-sex unions in Minnesota motivated them.
Michele Bachmann	June 18, 2011	Minneapolis, Minnesota	Bachmann, a member of the United States House of Representatives from Minnesota, was glitter bombed in Minneapolis by Rachel E. B. Lang with the support of the LGBT-interest organizations GetEQUAL and COLAGE. Lang was motivated by Bachmann's support for a ministry that opposes LGBT issues.
Bachmann & Associates	July 21, 2011	Lake Elmo, Minnesota	Michele Bachmann's husband Marcus Bachmann is a therapist whose clinical practices, in particular his practicing reparative therapy designed to change the sexual orientation of patients from homosexual to heterosexual, drew scrutiny during his wife's 2012 presidential campaign. Activists dressed as barbarians (a reference to a comment by Marcus Bachmann analogizing homosexuality to barbarism) glitter bombed Bachmann & Associates' Minnesota office to protest the Bachmanns' stances on LGBT issues.
Minnesota for Marriage	September 4, 2011	Falcon Heights, Minnesota	Minnesota for Marriage, an organization that favors passing a constitutional amendment disallowing same-sex marriage in Minnesota, was glitter bombed at the 2011 Minnesota State Fair by protesters opposed to the amendment.
Karl Rove	October 7, 2011	Bloomington, Minnesota	During a book signing, Rove was glitter bombed by Ben Egerman. No charges were filed.
Erik Paulsen	October 7, 2011	Bloomington, Minnesota	Congressman Erik Paulsen (R-MN) who was receiving a "Friend of the Family" award for his efforts to place a constitution amendment to ban marriages for same-sex couples on the ballot in Minnesota for 2012. Michael Cahil shouted "You're no friend to my family!" as he showered Paulsen with glitter.
Dan Savage	November 1, 2011	Eugene, Oregon	Savage was glitter bombed on November 1, 2011, at the University of Oregon, Eugene. The glitter bomber said they were a representative of the "Dan Savage Welcoming Committee" and that Savage was a "transphobe" as well as "racist and misogynist and a rape-apologist".
Dan Savage	November 9, 2011	Irvine, California	Savage was hit again on November 9, 2011, at a talk at the University of California, Irvine, with one bomber saying Savage was transphobic.
Dan Savage	January 21, 2012	Vancouver, British Columbia	Queer activists glitter bombed Dan Savage on January 21, 2012, on the way into his "It Gets Better" show at the Vogue Theatre in Vancouver. His response was "Oh no! Not again!" The group said the bombing was in response to "ableism, ageism, classism, misogyny, racism, rape-apologism, serophobia, sizism, transphobia and, oh yeah, that column".
Randall Terry	December 19, 2011	Goffstown, New Hampshire	Terry was glitter bombed by fellow presidential candidate Vermin Supreme during a lesser-known candidates forum at Saint Anselm College. Vermin said that Jesus told him to turn Terry gay.
Rick Santorum	January 21, 2012	Charleston, South Carolina	Santorum's first glitter bombing was at his South Carolina primary headquarters over the January 21–22 weekend of 2012. Occupy Charleston claimed credit for the incident. The protesters were forcibly removed after protesting Santorum's stance on LGBT+ rights.
Rick Santorum	January 23, 2012	Lady Lake, Florida	During a Florida presidential primary stop in Lady Lake, Florida, he was showered by a glitter bomb from protesters.
Joe Lieberman	January 28, 2012	Washington, D.C.	Senator Lieberman was glitter bombed by protesters with Occupy D.C. when he attended the Alfalfa Club's annual banquet.
Mitt Romney	February 1, 2012	Eagan, Minnesota	Romney was glitter bombed at a rally in Eagan, Minnesota. His response was to smile and proclaim it was confetti for winning Florida.
Rick Santorum	February 2, 2012	Columbia, Missouri	Santorum was again glitter bombed while at a presidential primary campaign event that also featured Focus on the Family founder James Dobson.
Ron Paul	February 6, 2012	Minneapolis, Minnesota	Ron Paul was glitter bombed at a rally in the Minneapolis Convention Center by a protester who shouted "Housing and health care are human rights not privileges!"
Mitt Romney	February 7, 2012	Denver, Colorado	Romney was glitter bombed again following a speech during the Colorado Primary. A protester attempted to glitter bomb Romney, but was quickly caught and removed by Secret Service agents, and he pleaded guilty to disturbing the peace in April 2012.
Rick Santorum	February 13, 2012	Tacoma, Washington	During a presidential primary stop in Tacoma, Washington, Santorum was covered in a "blizzard of glitter".
Rick Santorum	February 15, 2012	Fargo, North Dakota	Santorum made a presidential primary stop in Fargo, North Dakota, and was showered by a glitter bomb in front of a packed crowd at a Holiday Inn. He launched into his speech seemingly unfazed by the event.
Germaine Greer	March 14, 2012	Wellington, New Zealand	Germaine Greer was glitter bombed at a book signing at the Embassy Theatre in Wellington, New Zealand. A group known as the Queer Avengers was responsible. They were protesting Greer's views on transgender rights, which the group claims are transphobic.
Lindsay Lohan	March 18, 2013	Los Angeles, California	Lindsay Lohan and her media swarm were showered with gold glitter as she walked to the Los Angeles Court house on March 18, 2013. The woman suspected of throwing the glitter was not arrested and there was no apparent motive.
Jair Bolsonaro	January 26, 2016	Porto Alegre, Brazil	Glitter was thrown at Jair Bolsonaro while giving an interview at the Legislative Assembly of Rio Grande do Sul, while also being called a 'fascist', 'racist' and 'homophobe'.
George Galloway	November 22, 2016	Aberdeen, Scotland	George Galloway was covered in glitter as he attempted to give a talk to the University of Aberdeen Politics & International Relations Society. A group of students carried out the protest citing Galloway's alleged rape apologism and antisemitism.
Richard B. Spencer	April 9, 2017	Washington, D.C.	Richard B. Spencer was glitter bombed while leading a protest against the 2017 Shayrat missile strike. Counter-protesters called him a "Nazi snowflake" and glitter bombed him. It was unclear if anyone was arrested in relation to the glitter-bombing.
Super Happy Fun America	July 1, 2019	Boston, Massachusetts	Samson Racioppi, John Hugo, and a third member of Super Happy Fun America, the organizers of a straight pride parade in Boston, were sent postal glitter bombs on July 1, 2019. The letters did not have return addresses and contained Bible verses inside of them. They were reported as suspicious packages, prompting responses from the Massachusetts State Police's bomb squad and the FBI.
Keir Starmer	October 10, 2023	Liverpool, England	Glitter bombed before a speech at the 2023 Labour Party Conference, by a man rushing onto the stage shouting "We demand a people's house, we are in crisis – politics needs an update. We are in crisis."
Bjarni Benediktsson	December 8, 2023	Reykjavík, Iceland	Minister for Foreign Affairs Bjarni Benediktsson was glitter bombed twice at the University of Iceland during a meeting marking the 75th anniversary of the Universal Declaration of Human Rights. Protestors were criticising Iceland's silence on the Gaza war.

== Postal glitter bombs ==
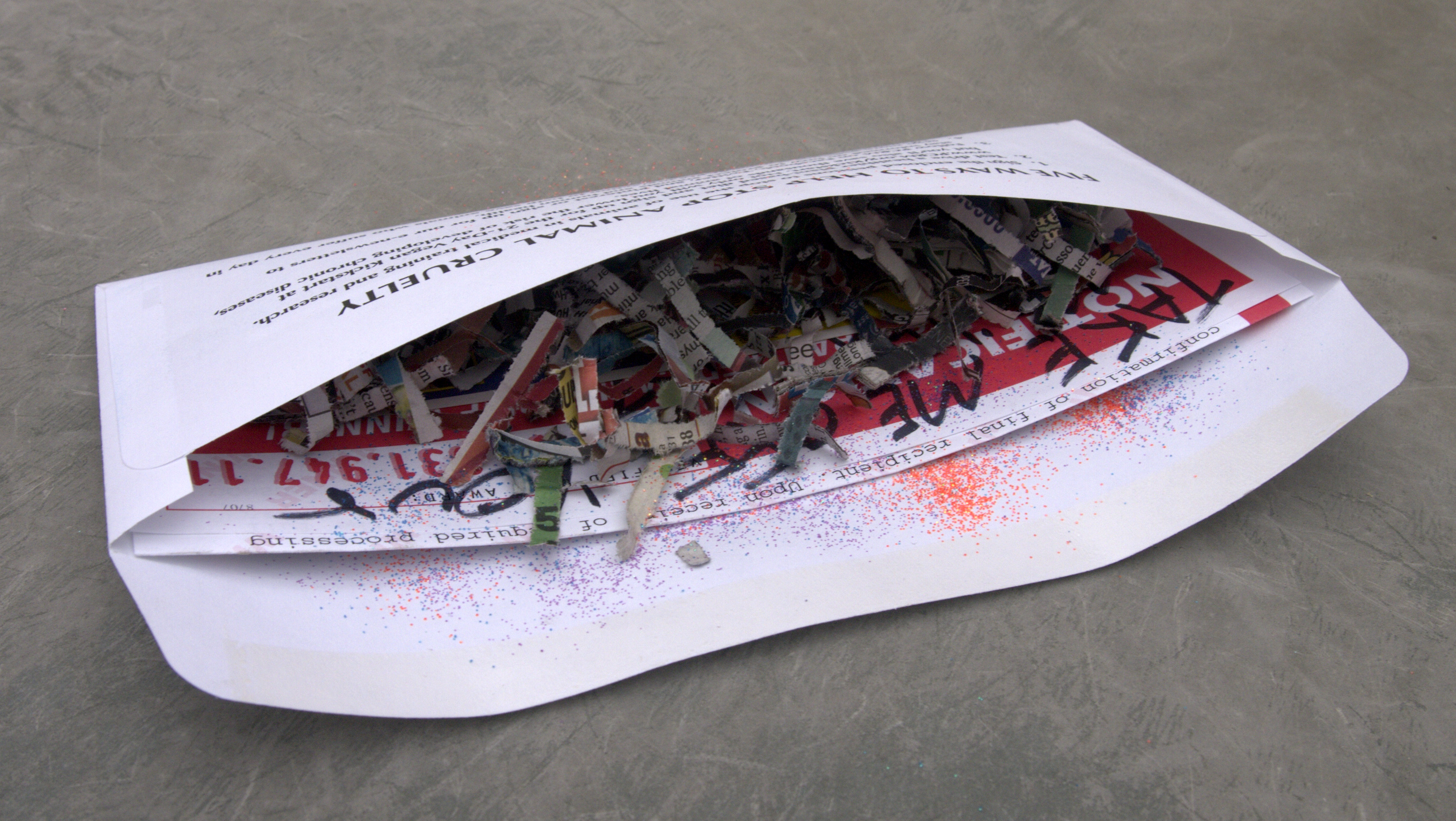
Unwanted junk mail returned to sender as a glitter bomb

Glitter bombs can be sent through the post, so that glitter falls from an envelope or is forcefully ejected from a larger, spring-loaded package when opened. Shipyourenemiesglitter.com went viral in January 2015 as the first postal glitter bomb service to send envelopes filled with glitter to recipients. Shortly after, a video of a spring loaded glitter bomb package from RuinDays.com went viral that demonstrated a postal glitter bomb in action for the first time. There are now many other websites and services offering postal glitter bombs.

== In media ==
=== YouTube ===
In December 2018 YouTube content-creator Mark Rober built a glitter bomb that was combined with regular emissions of an aerosolized fart odor to trap package thieves, specifically porch pirates and car thieves. According to him, he was inspired to use engineering to punish porch pirates after he was the victim of package theft. He used 4 phones with cameras and a GPS device so he could record the thief, upload the data, and recover the package. He then sent about 10 out and showed the footage from the packages on his YouTube channel, with the numerous swear words shouted in surprise bleeped out. By December 2023 Rober had continued making new Glitter Bombs and it is now on its sixth and final iteration of a series.

== See also ==
- Egging
- Flour bombing
- Incidents of objects being thrown at politicians
- Inking (attack)
- Milkshaking
- Pieing
- Shoe-throwing
- Tactical frivolity
- Zapping
- Zelyonka attack
- List of practical joke topics
