= Flour bomb =

Form of protest

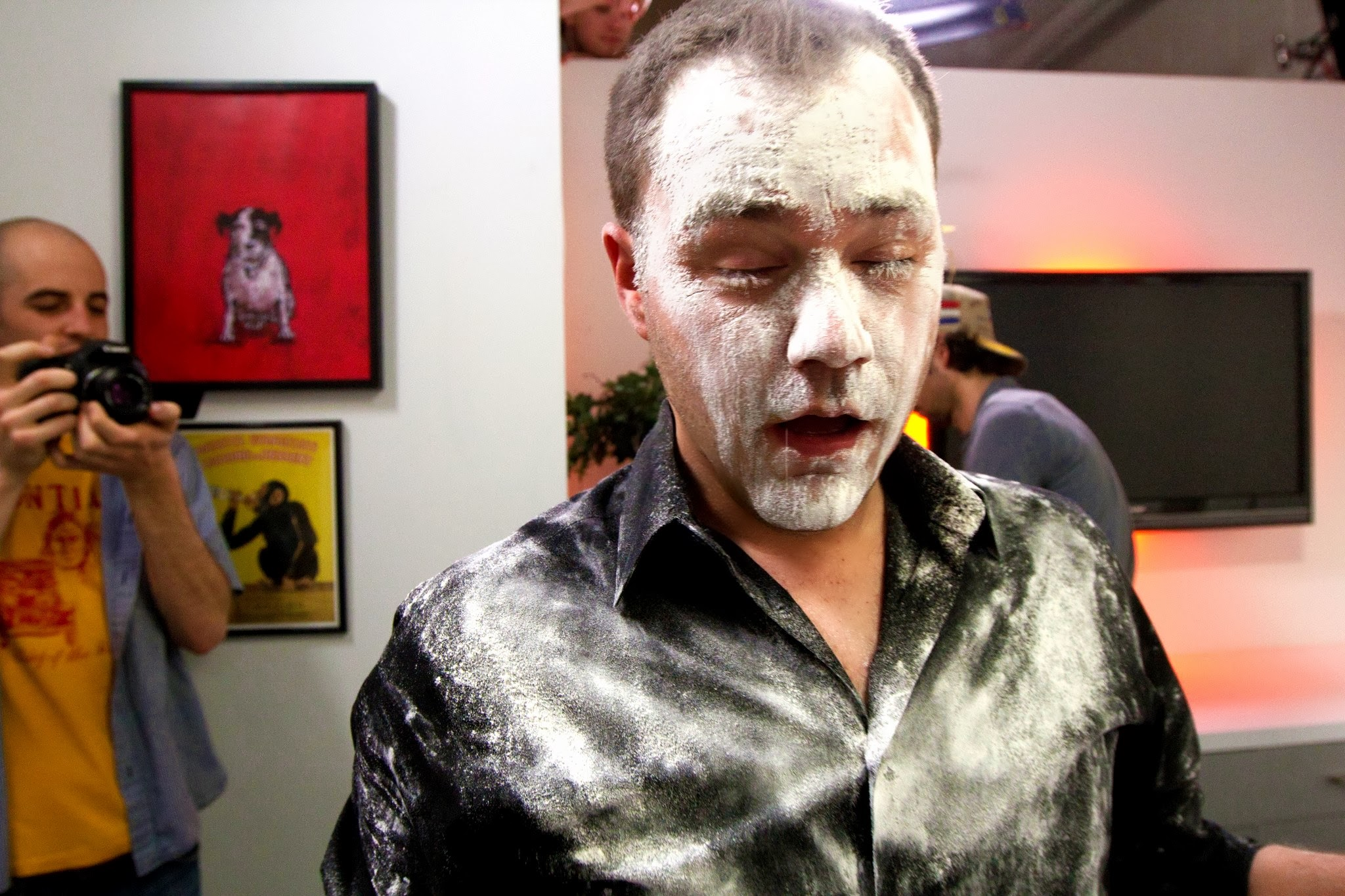
A person whose face and clothes have been hit by a flour bomb

A flour bomb is a fragile container (e.g. a paper bag) filled with flour for the purpose to be thrown at a person or object to cause an inconvenient and messy stain. Alternately, sometimes a bucket of flour can be used.

Flour bombs and flour bombing are a classic protest method, along with the throwing of eggs and overripe tomatoes.

== Notable incidents ==
Flour bombs saw notable use during the controversial 1981 Springbok Tour at Eden Park in Auckland, New Zealand. In an attempt to disrupt the match, flour bombs, along with flares, leaflets and a parachute-support banner reading "Biko" were dropped into Eden Park from a light plane flying overhead. A New Zealand All Blacks player was felled by one of the flour bombs.

On 19 May 2004, during Prime Minister's Questions, two members of the Fathers 4 Justice organisation threw condoms filled with purple-dyed flour at Tony Blair, in the chamber of the House of Commons of the United Kingdom. The event highlighted the poor security methods employed in and around the Houses of Parliament at the time.

Several candidates in the 2017 French Presidential Election, including future president Emmanuel Macron, were hit by flour bombs.

== See also ==
- Acid throwing
- Egging
- Glitter bombing
- Inking (attack)
- Milkshaking
- Pieing
- Shoe-throwing
- Zapping
- Zelyonka attack
