= Zelyonka attack =

Form of political protest in Russia and Ukraine

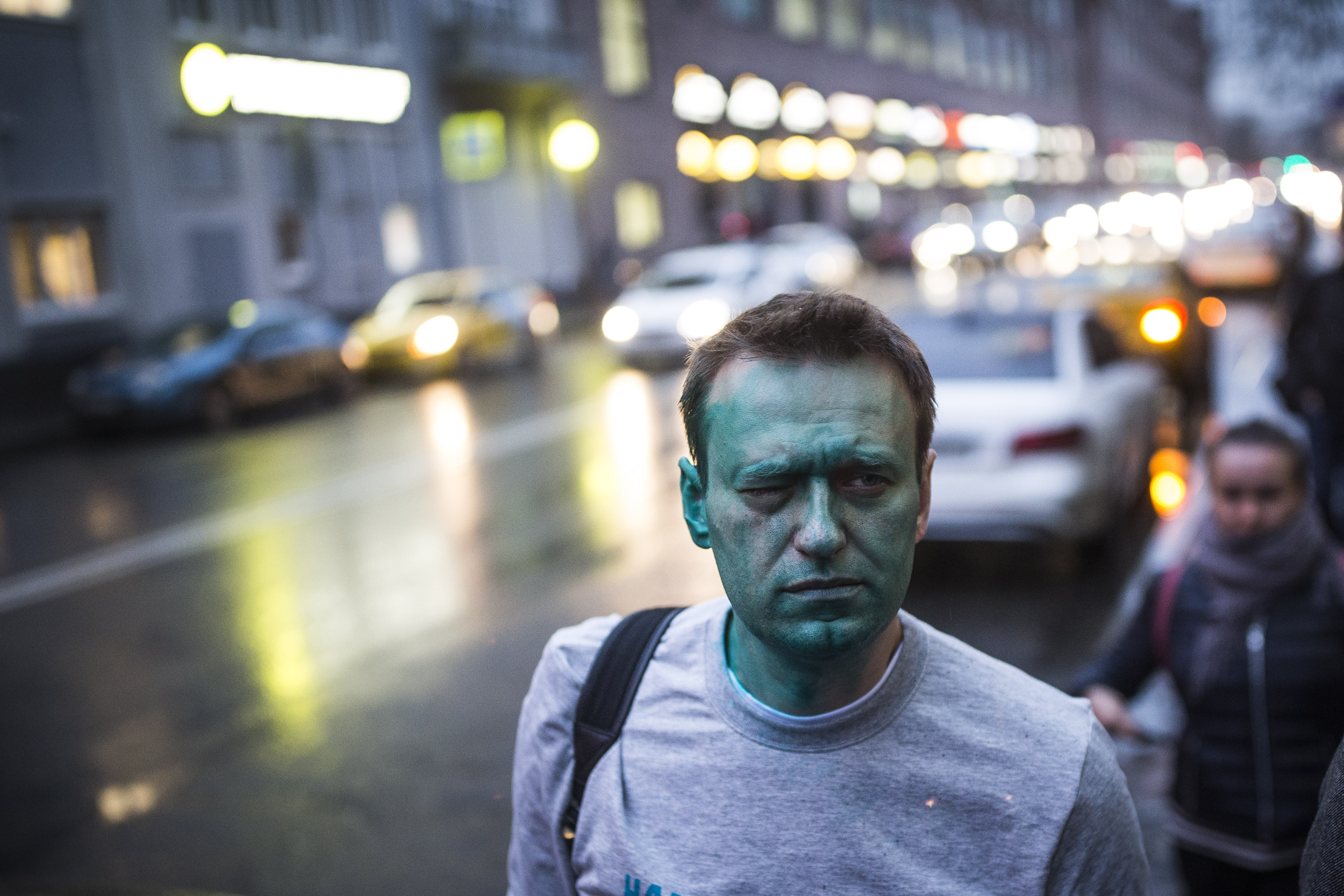
Alexei Navalny after a zelyonka attack in Moscow (2017)

A zelyonka attack is a form of protest, provocation or violent assault, defined as throwing a solution of brilliant green (Russian: зелёнка, zelyonka, Ukrainian: зеленка, zelenka), a triarylmethane antiseptic dye, on the body (usually face) of a victim. On top of potential danger of vision loss, it is very hard to remove quickly; the complete natural removal may take up to a week. In the 2010s, zelyonka attacks became widespread in Russia and Ukraine by pro-government activists against anti-government political and other personalities.

== Zelyonka dye ==
Zelyonka is a triarylmethane antiseptic dye that is widely used medically in Russia and Ukraine. The dye, often used as a milder alternative to iodine, is available in Russian pharmacies and drug stores. The dye is very hard to wash off and can leave a stain for days afterwards, and requires an acid to fully remove. However, unless zelyonka is mixed with other substances (e.g. as with the second attack on Alexei Navalny), it leaves no long-term damage, and thus victims have little legal recourse.

== Victims and influence ==
The use of the dye was associated with pro-Kremlin activists, although it was never directly tied to the Russian government. The victims of zelyonka attacks were almost always Russian opposition voices, such as Sergey Mitrokhin, Mikhail Kasyanov, Lyudmila Ulitskaya, Pussy Riot activists Maria Alyokhina and Nadezhda Tolokonnikova, and Alexei Navalny, and Ukrainian politicians, journalists and activists, including Petro Poroshenko, Arsen Avakov, Arseniy Yatsenyuk, Oleksandr Turchynov, Oleh Liashko, and Ruslan Kotsaba.

In 2023, journalist Elena Milashina was attacked in the Russian region of Chechnya. The attackers shaved her head and covered her in zelyonka.

As a result of numerous attacks, part of the Russian opposition leaders began to use zelyonka and green color as a "badge of honor". After Navalny was attacked in Barnaul, dozens of his supporters posted online photos of themselves "in green" (#GreenNavalny), and blogger Nikolai Danilov, who came to Red Square with a face covered with green colour, was detained by the police. When Kasyanov was attacked on the memorial march for Boris Nemtsov, the demonstrants began to cry out: "You won't pour zelyonka over us!"

On 4 May 2017, Alexei Navalny stated that the incidents involving zelyonka ended up helping his fundraising. On the same day, Russian poet Dmitry Bykov published a poem "Vivat, Green Russia!", in which green color was named as the color of "Russian revolution".

== See also ==
- Acid attack
- Dye pack
- Egging
- Flour bomb
- Glitter bombing
- Inking (attack)
- Milkshaking
- Pieing
- Shoe throwing
- Tarring and feathering
- Toilet papering

== Sources ==
- Brent Hierman. Russia and Eurasia 2017-2018. — Rowman & Littlefield, 2017. — P. 94. — 345 p. — ISBN 9781475835175.
- In Russia, a green-colored antiseptic becomes a weapon in attacks against opposition activists and journalists // Los Angeles Times. — 2017. — 3 May.
- Sarah Sloat: What Is «Zelyonka», the Russian Green Dye Weapon of Choice? // Inverse. — 2017. — 2 May.
- Isabel Gorst: Russian opposition leader Alexei Navalny attacked with green dye // The Irish Times. — 2017. — 28 April.
- Eva Hartog: Why Russia's Opposition Now Takes Pride in «Brilliant Green» Attacks // The Moscow Times. — 2017. — 23 March.
- A Russian Man Wore Green Face Paint to Red Square in Support of Alexei Navalny. So the Cops Arrested Him // The Moscow Times. — 2017. — 20 March.
- Dan Bilefsky, Oleg Matsnev: A Putin Opponent Is Doused in Green. He Makes It Work / A Putin Critic Is Doused Bright Green; Selfies Follow // The New York Times. — 2017. — 21 March. — P. A10.
- Alexandra Arkhipova, Dmitry Doronin, Elena Iougaï, Anna Kirziouk, Darya Radtchenko Légitimation et disqualification par l'histoire dans les manifestations de rue en Russie (2011-2016) // Le Mouvement Social. — 2017. — Vol. 260, livr. 3. — P. 129. — ISSN 1961-8646. — DOI:10.3917/lms.260.0129.
