= You Can Run But You Cannot Hide International =

Organization

- Abbreviation: YCRBYCHI
- Formation: 2007; 19 years ago
- Dissolved: 2013; 13 years ago
- Type: Youth ministry
- Headquarters: 125 Oak Ave Suite 200; Annandale, Minnesota 55302
- Coordinates: 45°15′51″N 94°7′27″W
- Founder: Bradlee Dean
- President: Bradley Smith
- Budget: $836,223 (2010)
- Staff: 31
- Volunteers: 25

You Can Run But You Cannot Hide International (YCRBYCHI) was a United States Christian youth ministry that held assemblies (including music concerts and discussions with students) in public schools.

The ministry received testimonials from school officials and students "that praise the positive impact the assemblies had by stressing the importance of good choices and using a band to grab attention." However, the ministry also attracted controversy for using public school assemblies for religious purposes. Detractors claim the ministry misled school administrators about the nature of the program and proselytized its views on abortion and homosexuality. The Southern Poverty Law Center designated the organization as an anti-gay hate group in March 2012.

== History ==
Founded by Brad Lee Dean in 2007, the organization was based in Annandale, Minnesota.

In September 2013, the You Can Run headquarters building in Annandale was put up for rent. At the same time, there were reports of departures of the ministry's staff and the disbanding of its street teams.

== Ministry activities ==
=== Junkyard Prophet ===
YCRBYCHI was centered on their in-house Christian rapcore-nu metal band Junkyard Prophet, with founder Brad Lee Dean on drums, Rene Benton on guitar and vocals, Massey Campos on vocals and bass; and Wayne Ruark on lead vocals. Dean, a survivor of multiple drug overdoses and jail incarcerations, broke into music in the 1980s. He directed Junkyard Prophet's music toward aiding youths overcoming "trials and tribulations, persecutions, and afflictions...." Dean's wife, Stephanie Dean, a former commercial actress, joined the band for sexual abstinence-themed songs.

=== High school assemblies ===
The organization held high school assemblies, which began with a one-hour set from Junkyard Prophet, which incorporated a fog machine that frequently set off school fire alarms. The noise-level of the music led one high school staffer to warn students of permanent hearing loss at a 2005 assembly.

After their musical performance, Dean typically gave a lecture where he put forth his views on teen pregnancy, the Constitution, abstinence, abortion, and his belief that the media has a liberal slant while reporting. During his interactive speech with the assembled students, Dean frequently waded into controversial issues such as gun control, abortion, environmentalism, and education reform.

Dean claimed that "99.5 percent of everything we do in the assembly is accepted by the kids in an awesome way," though he maintained that teachers were more resistant to the organization's message.

Reported fees for school programs ranged from $1200 to $5000. The organization sometimes reduced or waived this fee if schools were unable to pay. A writer traveling with the group detailed instances in which the band's expenses exceeded its income or it has been forced to spend the night sleeping in cars.

=== The Sons of Liberty ===
YCRBYCHI paid to air the radio show The Sons of Liberty, hosted by Dean and Jake McMillan, on WWTC Radio in Minneapolis and on the Genesis Communication Network. While still streaming on the GCN website, WWTC canceled the program in May 2011 after the duo aired a lengthy song mocking African Americans. WWTC's manager, protesting that staff members at his station were neither bigots nor racists, reported that "the divisive tone" of the show was objectionable to the "right spirit" of conservatism the station sought. Dean later claimed that the show would reappear on KTLK-FM, a conservative talk station. Though admitting some talks had taken place, KTLK's station manager denied that the show had been signed. The Sons of Liberty was reinstated on WWTC after a three-month break.

== Political activities ==
In May 2011, Dean was invited to deliver a prayer in front of the Minnesota House of Representatives. He was criticized by members of both parties for the prayer, largely due to the direct references to Jesus and perceived accusations against Democrats and President Obama. His history of statements against homosexuality, though not part of the prayer, also elicited complaints. His address was criticized by Minnesota Democratic–Farmer–Labor Party (DFL) representative Terry Morrow, who said that the hope of peace during the prayer had been "crushed by a single person's words." Majority Leader Matt Dean and speaker Kurt Zellers, both Republicans, also denounced Brad Lee Dean; Zellers said inviting him to speak had been "a mistake", and called him "a man I personally denounce," and said, "I can only ask you for your forgiveness. That type of person will never, ever be allowed on the House floor again." Representative Ernie Leidiger, a Republican who had invited Dean to speak in the first place, later apologized for the invitation and compared Dean's position on homosexuality to that of Nazi Germany. Dean was also denounced by the Minnesota Catholic Conference and DFL representatives Karen Clark and D. Scott Dibble; Clark called Dean "a hateful person". In June 2011, presidential candidate Michele Bachmann was sprayed with glitter by Minnesota gay-rights activist Rachel E.B. Lang who was upset with Bachmann's support of YCRBYCHI.

In April 2012, the Minnesota State College Republican board threatened to revoke the charter of the St. Cloud State University chapter of College Republicans if they hosted a speech by Dean on campus. The College Republican group was "disgusted with the GOP's threats" and voted unanimously to go ahead with the event as planned. While protest ensued, students stayed to hear Dean speak. They said Dean "has a strong conservative message. He's pro-constitutional, pro-family, pro-vets and he speaks about the core values of the GOP".

== Reception ==
You Can Run But You Cannot Hide International was supported by Minnesota Congresswoman Michele Bachmann and Republican gubernatorial candidate Tom Emmer. Emmer's campaign gave the organization $250 in 2008, prompting criticism due to the group's views on homosexuality. Bachmann has praised the organization, appearing as a keynote speaker at their fundraisers. Dean has indicated that both Bachmann and Emmer will appear in his upcoming documentary My War.

YCRBYCHI has been praised by many churches and religious and conservative organizations, and strongly criticized by civil rights groups and the media, primarily due to its opposition to abortion and same-sex marriage.

Proponents, such as former Alabama Supreme Court Chief Justice Roy Moore, endorsed the program for bringing "God and His law back to our public school system." 2004 Presidential Candidate for the Constitution Party, Michael Peroutka, visited their Minnesota headquarters and wrote an article regarding his visit with the group on his website, The American View. Dean was featured in The New York Times, Fox News, and The Weekly Standard.

== Controversies ==
=== Role in schools ===
Critics claimed that the program overstepped its role in schools and intimidated students. Some students said that the assemblies presented cult-like propaganda that "encouraged bigotry and hate-mongering".

The organization was at the center of multiple controversies for its school performances, many revolving around its presentation of religious material in public educational settings. During an assembly at Pequot Lakes High School in 2007, students were shown graphic images of aborted fetuses, and girls were made to chant about being submissive to their husbands. The assembly made students cry and angered parents. After a 2005 Arkansas assembly, the principal asserted that the group had "misrepresented" its "right-wing message" and that the group "won't be back". A Wisconsin principal, whose school was visited in 2003, later called a second assembly to apologize to the students for allowing YCRBYCHI a forum for "brainwashing" a "captive audience". A Tennessee principal also apologized to students in 2004 "for any controversy or heartache the assembly generated".

The organization, which didn't mention its aim to evangelize for Christianity in the "Principal Packet" it sent to school administrators, often only revealed their religious leanings during their assemblies. Dean affirmed that the assemblies were "used as a tool to have the hearts of the kids opened to receive. the Christian message of hard-hitting truth without compromise", though Dean said that school administrators were fully apprised of YCRBYCHI's program prior to the organization's arrival. However, critics said "The full religiousness of YCR is not revealed until event staff offer departing students literature directing them to Web sites that make clear the ultra-conservative Protestant nationalism of the ministry."

Additionally, Individuals outside the organization said that "much of the history that YCRBYCH present is, in fact, either highly sanitized, inaccurate, or demonstrably false."

=== LGBTQ rights ===
In 2010, the group's connections to Tom Emmer were highlighted on The Rachel Maddow Show; during the episode, Rachel Maddow was critical of statements that Dean made on WWTC about the execution of homosexuals in Muslim countries. The statement, in part, was "Muslims are calling for the execution of homosexuals in America. They themselves are holding up the laws that are even in the Bible, the Judeo-Christian God but they seem to be more moral than even the American Christians...". Maddow mentioned Dean's disclaimer on this particular report which said, "We have never and will never call for the execution of homosexuals." In May 2011, Maddow again reported on Dean's statements, this time in connection to Michele Bachmann, a potential presidential candidate at the time. In this report, Maddow did not reference Dean's claim that he did not call for homosexual executions. She instead stated, "Foreign enemies rising up because Christians are not doing enough to kill the gays," and accused Dean and Bachmann of being "bloodthirsty." Dean made numerous statements opposing LGBT-rights, including advocating incarceration of homosexuals and going as far as to state that homosexuality is against the law in the United States. Dean accused the media, specifically MSNBC, as catering to "progressives, meaning a generally secular, frequently atheist, pro-gay rights, socialist, and big-government market among its viewers."

In response to media coverage, Dean wrote an editorial alleging that his statements were taken out of context, and produced a video which sought to rebut the media's reporting on his statements. Dean claimed her second report prompted death threats. On July 27, 2011, Dean initiated a defamation lawsuit against MSNBC, Maddow, journalist Andy Birkey, and the Minnesota Independent, alleging that they intentionally misrepresented Dean's statements in order to advance a "homosexual agenda", and seeking more than $50,000,000 in damages. Dean was represented in the case by right-wing attorney Larry Klayman. Dean lost the case in June 2012, and was ordered to pay a total of $24,625.23 to defendants MSNBC & Rachel Maddow. Dean reacted to this defeat with the claim that "Judges are to enforce the law, not to defend lawbreakers and then award them money."

The nonprofit civil rights organization Southern Poverty Law Center designated the organization as an anti-gay hate group in March 2012.
