= Vermin Supreme =

American novelty candidate (born 1961)

Vermin Love Supreme
- Supreme in 2026 wearing his characteristic Wellington boot

Member of the Libertarian Party Judicial Committee
- In office July 12, 2020 – May 29, 2022

Personal details
- Born: June 1, 1961 (age 65) Rockport, Massachusetts, U.S.
- Party: US Pirate Party (2024–present)
- Other political affiliations: Independent (1987–2004, 2023); Democratic (2004–2008, 2012–2016, 2023–2024); Libertarian (2016–2023); Republican (2008–2012)
- Education: Gloucester High School
- Occupation: Performance artist; presidential candidate; activist
- Supreme's voice Supreme on the Free Talk Live podcast Recorded November 6, 2012

Vermin Love Supreme (born June 1, 1961) is an American performance artist and activist who has run as a novelty candidate in various local, state, and national elections in the United States. He served as a member of the Libertarian Party's judicial committee. Supreme is known for wearing a boot as a hat and carrying a large toothbrush, and has said that if elected President of the United States, he will pass a law requiring people to brush their teeth. He has campaigned on a platform of zombie apocalypse awareness and time travel research, and promised a free pony for every American.

In 2011, he participated in the Occupy Boston protests. He is the subject of the 2014 documentary Who Is Vermin Supreme? An Outsider Odyssey, which follows his 2012 campaign and explores his life as an activist and political prankster.

Supreme campaigned for the Libertarian Party's 2020 presidential nomination. At the 2020 Libertarian National Convention he came in third place, receiving 206 delegate votes out of 1,026.

== Political positions ==
Vermin Supreme is a perennial candidate known for using humor to mock the American political system. He adopts an eccentric persona during his campaigns and is often seen wearing a boot on his head.

Supreme discussed his political views in a 2008 promotional video. He said he was registered as a Republican at that time, but that he leaned toward anarchism and was influenced by the Situationist International, dadaism, and discordianism. He asserted that libertarians "are just about abolishing the government and letting shit fall where it may", which he called a mistake, though he later said that assertion was based on a "prejudice" for "lack of knowing." He asserted that Republicans want to nullify the government, but "offer no alternative to helping people other than charity." Supreme's vision of anarchism holds no need for government and depends on citizens to take responsibility for themselves and for others, citing "mutual aid and support and care to our fellow citizens" as key elements. To that end, Supreme has called for a gradual dismantling of the government, while citizens take up the slack. He asserted that Americans no longer know how to be citizens, placing some of the blame on schools that teach in a "very twisted and jingoistic fashion".

Discussing his presidential campaign in the video, Supreme describes his "joke humor" campaign as a response to the lies people are fed by the media and by the government.

In an interview with New Hampshire magazine in 2018, Supreme labeled his political beliefs as "social anarchist" and opined that Peter Kropotkin "was a great anarchist thinker and writer".

== Political campaigns ==
=== Early political activity ===
In 1986, Supreme joined the Great Peace March for Global Nuclear Disarmament in protest of nuclear weapons. Supreme's first political campaign was for Mayor of Baltimore in 1987. At the time, Supreme was without income, and later said that he ran "mainly to give myself a project...something to do." The election was won by Kurt Schmoke.

Vermin Supreme speaking to crowds during the 2012 New Hampshire primary

=== Presidential campaigns ===
==== 1996 ====
Supreme ran for president in 1996. During the 1996 Democratic National Convention, he was present in the host city of Chicago. During the convention, he walked around with a giant prop toothbrush and handed out campaign flyers pledging "to do something about the weather...to pave over everything that hasn't been paved over yet...(and) legislation to make teeth brushing after every meal mandatory". The slogan of his 1996 campaign was "let him run your life because he knows what's best for you".

==== 2004 ====
Supreme campaigned in the Washington, D.C. presidential primary in 2004, where he received 149 votes.

==== 2008 ====
Supreme campaigned in the New Hampshire Republican primary in 2008. He received 41 votes (0.02%) in the New Hampshire primary. According to the Federal Election Commission (FEC), he also received 43 votes nationally in the general election.

==== 2012 ====
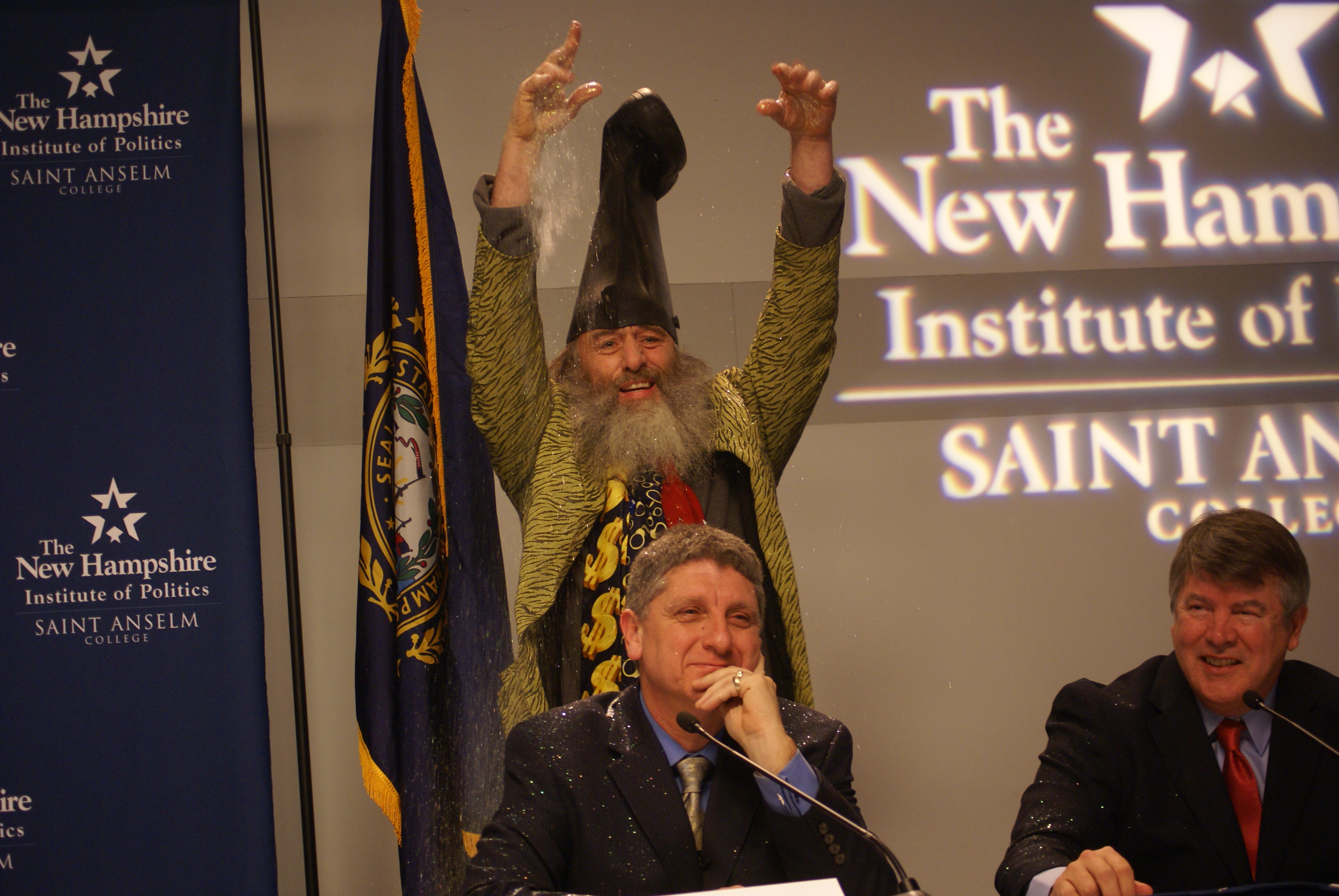
Supreme glitter bombs Randall Terry during a forum at the New Hampshire Institute of Politics at Saint Anselm College in December 2011.

Supreme campaigned as a Democrat in the 2012 U.S. presidential election. His candidacy was supported by the Good Humor Party.

On April 14, 2011, Supreme participated in the First Debate of the New Election Cycle at the IGLO Dissidents' Convention which also included Jimmy McMillan, Jill Stein, and others. He qualified to be listed on the 2012 Democratic Party primary ballot in New Hampshire. On October 29, 2011, Supreme participated in a satirical debate against a representative of the campaign of deceased British occultist Aleister Crowley. On December 19, he participated in the "Lesser-Known Democratic Candidates Presidential Forum", at the New Hampshire Institute of Politics at Saint Anselm College and "glitterbombed" fellow candidate Randall Terry.

He was a candidate in the Iowa Democratic caucuses, and received 1.4% of the votes on January 3, 2012. On January 10, 2012, in the Democratic Primary in New Hampshire, Supreme received 833 votes. (Barack Obama won the primary with 49,080 votes.)

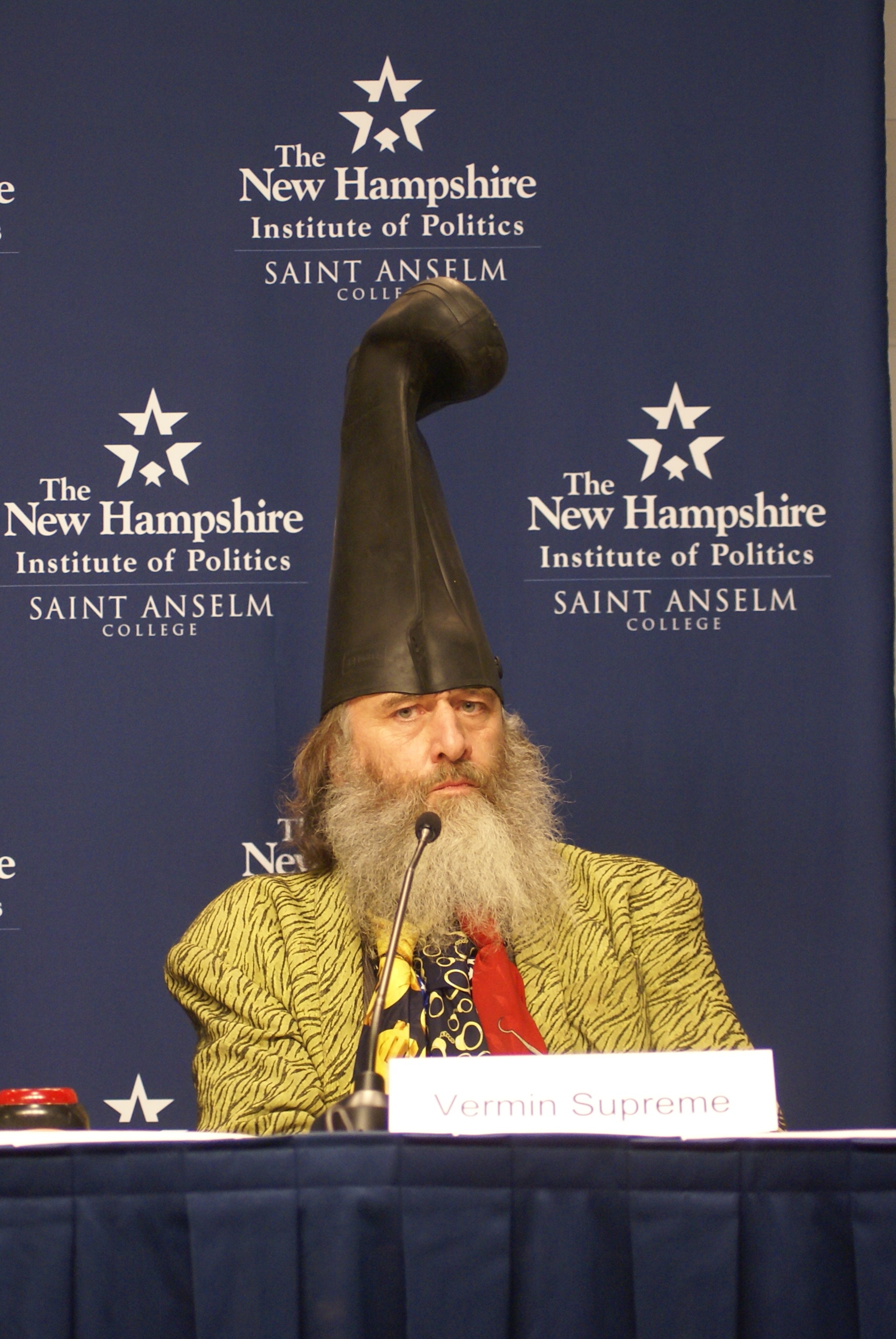
Supreme in 2011

Supreme participated in the anti-NATO protests at the May 20–21 Chicago NATO Summit. In May 2012, he visited the second largest regional high school in Maine to give a speech about his campaign style to a government class. In June 2012, he participated in the Rainbow Gathering in Tennessee.

On August 25, Supreme announced his new political party, the Free Pony Party, with whom he stated he would give all citizens "a free pony" and that he had chosen fellow fringe opponent Jimmy McMillan as his running mate. Conversely, McMillan stated he was still running for president on his own Rent Is Too Damn High Party platform, and that Supreme would be McMillan's running mate. In October, Supreme participated in a debate hosted by Peter Schiff in the Peter Schiff Radio Show, which featured a panel of overlooked presidential candidates including McMillan, independent write-in candidate Santa Claus, and write-in Republican presidential candidate Edgar Lawson.

==== 2016 ====
Supreme attempted another presidential run in 2016. He embarked on a tour of 20 cities to build support for his campaign and sought to qualify for matching funds from the Federal Election Commission (FEC). He filed as a candidate in the New Hampshire Democratic presidential primary on November 21, 2015. He was not invited to return to the Lesser-Known Democratic Candidates Presidential Forum, due in part to him glitter bombing Randall Terry at the event in 2011. Shortly before the primary, he was observed questioning Republican candidates Chris Christie and Ted Cruz through a bullhorn. Supreme engaged Christie in an informal debate over his free pony platform, during which he accused Christie of hating ponies, and asked Cruz whether he thought that water being used during waterboarding should include fluoride.

Supreme received 256 votes in the primary on February 9, 2016, coming in fourth after former Maryland Governor Martin O'Malley, who had dropped out after the Iowa caucuses.

On March 4, Supreme switched his affiliation to the Libertarian Party. He received the vote of a single delegate in the first round of presidential nomination voting at the 2016 Libertarian National Convention.

==== 2020 ====
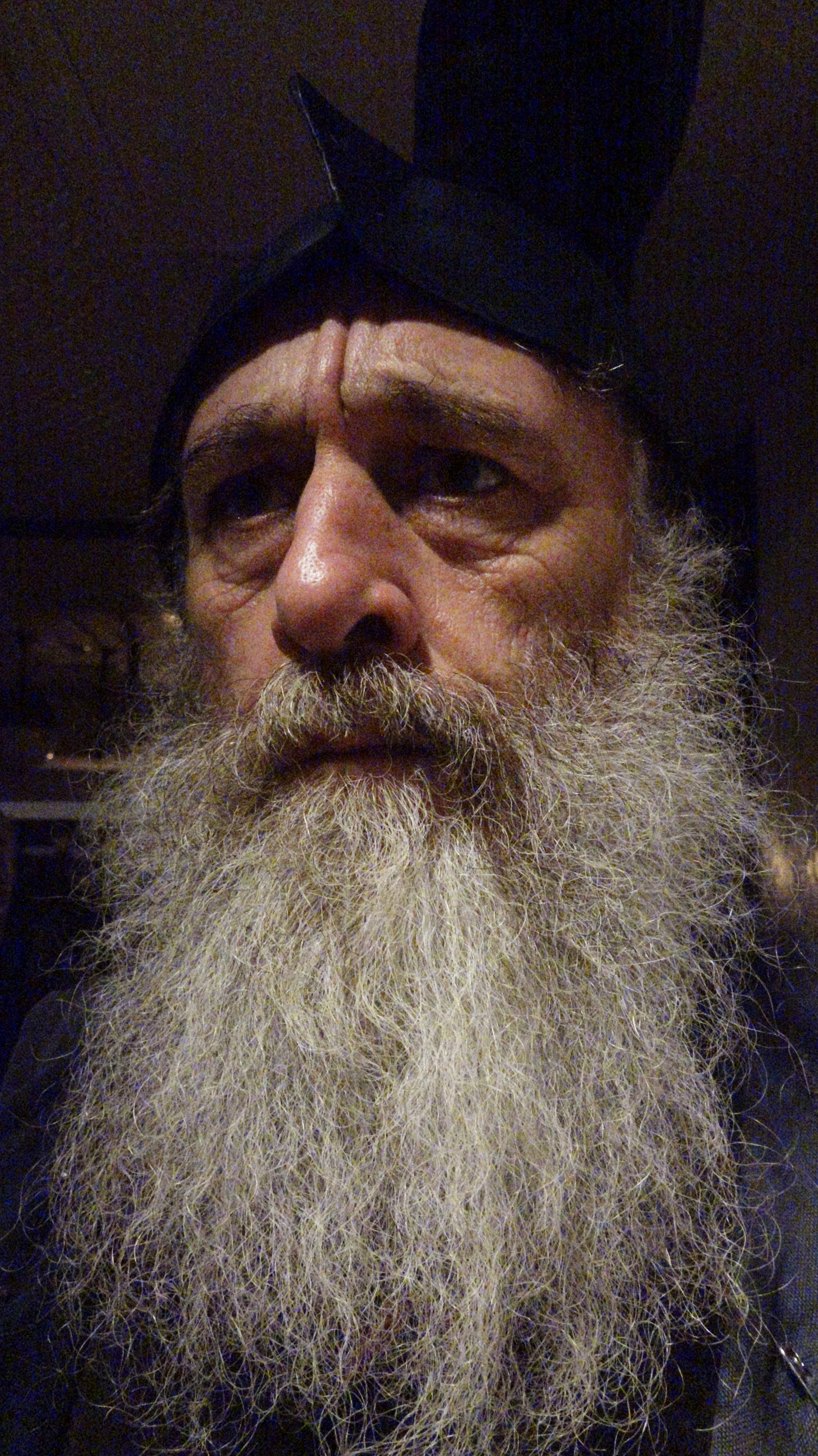
Vermin Supreme at Wikipedia Day NYC 2017

Supreme ran again for president in 2020, this time as a Libertarian. This marked the first time that Supreme ran a "legitimate" campaign, focusing on real rather than satirical issues and using the slogan "In On The Joke". While Supreme continued to use satirical humor, he focused more on legitimate political issues. He called for ending foreign wars and voiced support for pardoning non-violent drug offenders, ending the war on drugs, and reducing incarceration, which he called his top priority. On the COVID-19 pandemic, Supreme criticized President Donald Trump, arguing that he should have paid better attention to the virus and have made testing more widely available. He satirically promised to make COVID-19 illegal and, in a play on his campaign promise to go back in time and "kill baby Hitler," vowed to go back in time and "kill baby COVID." He facetiously pledged to create "COVID-19 free zones" because "they work so well for things like guns and drugs."

He won the Libertarian Presidential Preference Primary in New Hampshire on February 11, 2020. On March 3, 2020, Supreme was declared the winner of the Massachusetts primary. He dropped out on May 23, 2020, after Jo Jorgensen received the Libertarian Party's nomination for president. Incidentally, Supreme's running mate Spike Cohen was chosen to be the Libertarian vice presidential nominee.

==== 2024 ====
Supreme ran for president again in 2024, this time for the Democratic nomination. Supreme obtained ballot access in one state for the Democratic primaries, New Hampshire. On December 8, 2023, Supreme appeared at the Lesser-Known Candidates Forum hosted by Saint Anselm College in Manchester, New Hampshire. Supreme placed fifth in the New Hampshire Democratic primary with 0.7% of the vote. Supreme also appeared on the ballot for the Legal Marijuana Now Party's presidential nomination primary in Minnesota on March 5, 2024. He placed third among five candidates with 15.08% of the vote.

In June 2024, the US Pirate Party officially voted to endorse Supreme's candidacy for President. He was also nominated by the Conservative Party of Delaware and appeared on the general election ballot in that state.

=== Other campaigns ===
In 2018, Supreme expressed interest in running for Governor of Kansas. Although he did not live in the state, Kansas had very few strict requirements for running for office. Several teenagers taking advantage of the lack of requirements had filed to run for governor, and in order not to take any votes away from them, Supreme decided to run for Attorney General instead, becoming a challenger to incumbent Republican Derek Schmidt. The lack of requirements in order to run for office, as outlined in the state's Constitution, has been heralded by Supreme: "This is indeed a very interesting and attractive loophole," he said. "I think that's a very good thing for democracy." Desarae Lindsay of Texas was named his campaign treasurer and would accompany him to his 2020 presidential campaign. Supreme was eventually disqualified from running on the basis of his non-residency in the state, his home address being in Massachusetts.

On August 24, 2020, Supreme announced that he would be launching a write-in campaign for the Libertarian nomination for the 2020 Massachusetts senatorial election.

== "Right to pony" during 2017 Clinton book tour ==
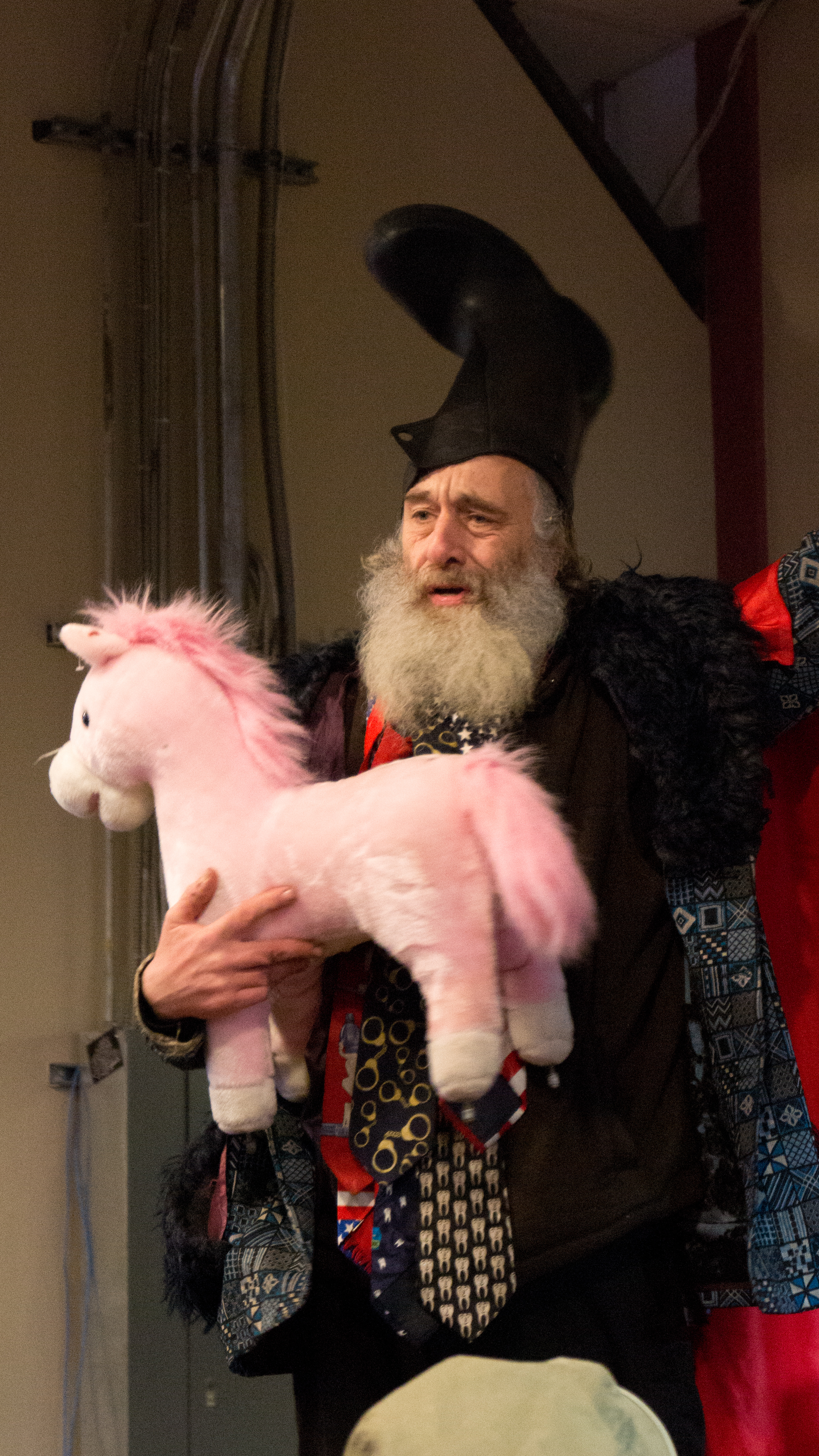
Supreme with a pony

In December 2017 Hillary Clinton planned to visit Concord, New Hampshire, for a book tour promoting her new book What Happened. In advance of her presentation, Supreme planned a demonstration in front of the bookstore during the event. The demonstration was to be a "pony protest" and would include at least one pony. Supreme has a history of making the election promise of ponies to constituents and has asserted that Clinton does not like ponies enough. When Supreme sought a protest permit for his demonstration, the police ordered the city to deny his request.

In response, Supreme asserted his "right to pony" and retained Marc Randazza, an attorney with a reputation for advocacy of First Amendment rights, to represent him in suing the city of Concord for the permit. The court found in favor of Supreme, issuing an injunction that the city give him a permit, allowing him to protest the event, along with his ponies. A stipulation was that Supreme had to pay a $75 "parking" fee for the ponies.

Supreme held the protest as a "parade" outside the bookstore.

== Filmography ==
List of acting performances in film and television
| Title | Year | Role | Genre |
|---|---|---|---|
| Subdue the Universe | 1997 | Himself | Documentary |
| Winning New Hampshire | 2004 | Himself | Documentary |
| 2008 Uncut | 2008 | Himself | TV series |
| Vote Jesus: The Chronicles of Ken Stevenson (documentary) | 2009 | Ken Stevenson | Film |
| Learnin' with Vermin | 2012 | Himself | Educational |
| Who Is Vermin Supreme? An Outsider Odyssey | 2014 | Himself | Documentary |
| Rich Hall's Presidential Grudge Match | 2016 | Himself | Documentary |

== Electoral history ==
=== 2004 District of Columbia Democratic presidential primary ===
2004 District of Columbia Democratic presidential primary
| Candidate | Popular vote | |
| Candidate | Count | Percentage |
|---|---|---|
| Howard Dean | 18,132 | 42.65% |
| Al Sharpton | 14,639 | 34.43% |
| Carol Moseley Braun | 4,924 | 11.58% |
| Dennis Kucinich | 3,481 | 8.19% |
| Lyndon LaRouche | 522 | 1.23% |
| Florence Walker | 257 | 0.60% |
| Aurther Jackson | 241 | 0.57% |
| Vermin Supreme | 149 | 0.35% |
| Harry Braun | 85 | 0.20% |
| Jeanne Chebib | 46 | 0.11% |
| Lucian Wojciechowski | 40 | 0.09% |
| Total | 42,516 | 100% |

=== 2008 Republican presidential primaries ===
New Hampshire Republican presidential primary, 2008
| Candidate | Votes | % |
|---|---|---|
| John McCain | 88,571 | 37.7% |
| Mitt Romney | 75,546 | 32.2% |
| Mike Huckabee | 26,859 | 11.4% |
| Rudy Giuliani | 20,439 | 8.7% |
| Ron Paul | 18,308 | 7.8% |
| Fred Thompson | 2,890 | 1.2% |
| Duncan Hunter | 1,217 | 0.51% |
| Alan Keyes | 203 | 0.086% |
| Stephen Marchuk | 123 | 0.058% |
| Tom Tancredo | 80 | 0.034% |
| Hugh Cort | 53 | 0.023% |
| Cornelius Edward O'Connor | 45 | 0.019% |
| Albert Howard | 44 | 0.0187% |
| Vern Wuensche | 44 | 0.0187% |
| Vermin Supreme | 41 | 0.0175% |
| John H. Cox | 39 | 0.017% |
| Daniel Gilbert | 33 | 0.014% |
| James Creighton Mitchell Jr. | 30 | 0.013% |
| Jack Shepard | 27 | 0.011% |
| Mark Klein | 19 | < 0.01% |
| H. Neal Fendig Jr. | 13 | < 0.01% |
| Hudson Starnes | 5 | < 0.01% |
| Other | 227 | 0.097% |
| Total votes | 234,851 | 100.00% |

=== 2016 Democratic presidential primaries ===
2016 Democratic presidential primaries
| Candidate | Votes | % |
|---|---|---|
| Hillary Clinton | 16,917,853 | 55.2% |
| Bernie Sanders | 13,210,550 | 43.1% |
| Martin O'Malley | 110,423 | 0.4% |
| Uncommitted | 101,481 | 0.3% |
| Rocky De La Fuente | 67,468 | 0.2% |
| No Preference | 50,990 | 0.2% |
| Scattering | 48,576 | 0.2% |
| Willie Wilson | 25,796 | 0.2% |
| Paul T. Farrell Jr. | 21,694 | 0.1% |
| Keith Russell Judd | 20,305 | 0.1% |
| Michael Steinberg | 20,126 | 0.1% |
| Henry Hewes | 11,062 | 0.065% |
| John Wolfe Jr. | 7,369 | 0.044% |
| Star Locke | 5,202 | 0.031% |
| Steve Burke | 4,893 | 0.029% |
| Lawrence "Larry Joe" Cohen | 2,407 | 0.014% |
| Calvis L. Hawes | 2,017 | 0.012% |
| James Valentine | 1,726 | 0.01% |
| Uninstructed Delegation | 1,488 | 0.0089% |
| Jon Adams | 486 | 0.0029% |
| Vermin Supreme | 268 | 0.0016% |
| Mark Stewart | 236 | 0.0014% |
| David John Thistle | 226 | 0.0013% |
| Graham Schwass | 143 | < 0.001% |
| Lloyd Thomas Kelso | 46 | < 0.001% |
| Mark Stewart Greenstein | 41 | < 0.001% |
| Eric Elbot | 36 | < 0.001% |
| William D. French | 29 | < 0.001% |
| Edward T. O'Donnell Jr. | 26 | < 0.001% |
| Robert Lovitt | 22 | < 0.001% |
| William H. McGaughey Jr. | 19 | < 0.001% |
| Edward Sonnino | 17 | < 0.001% |
| Steven Roy Lipscomb | 15 | < 0.001% |
| Sam Sloan | 15 | < 0.001% |
| Brock C. Hutton | 14 | < 0.001% |
| Raymond Michael Moroz | 8 | < 0.001% |
| Write-in | 60 | < 0.001% |
| Total votes | 30,633,131 | 100.00% |

=== 2020 Libertarian presidential primaries ===
2020 Libertarian presidential primaries
| Candidate | Votes | % |
|---|---|---|
| Jacob Hornberger | 9,177 | 20.3% |
| Jo Jorgensen | 5,110 | 11.2% |
| Vermin Supreme | 4,277 | 9.4% |
| Ken Armstrong | 3,507 | 7.7% |
| Kim Ruff | 3,030 | 7.7% |
| Adam Kokesh | 2,865 | 6.3% |
| Dan Behrman | 2,392 | 5.3% |
| Max Abramson | 2,039 | 4.5% |
| Sam Robb | 1,951 | 4.3% |
| Other | 7,193 | 15.9% |
| Total votes | 45,306 | 100.00% |

=== 2020 United States Senate election in Massachusetts ===
Libertarian primary results
| Party | Candidate | Votes | % |
|---|---|---|---|
| Libertarian | Other Write-ins | 3,390 | 99.21% |
| Libertarian | Vermin Supreme (write-in) | 27 | 0.79% |
| Total votes | | 3,417 | 100.00% |

=== 2024 Democratic Party primary in New Hampshire ===
New Hampshire Democratic primary, January 23, 2024
| Candidate | Votes | % |
|---|---|---|
| Joe Biden (incumbent; write-in) | 79,100 | 63.79 |
| Dean Phillips | 24,377 | 19.66 |
| Marianne Williamson | 5,016 | 4.05 |
| Derek Nadeau | 1,616 | 1.30 |
| "Cease Fire" (write-in) | 1,512 | 1.22 |
| Vermin Supreme | 912 | 0.74 |
| John Vail | 685 | 0.55 |
| Robert F. Kennedy Jr. (write-in) (Ind.) | 439 | 0.35 |
| Donald Picard | 371 | 0.30 |
| Paperboy Prince | 326 | 0.26 |
| Paul V. LaCava | 176 | 0.14 |
| Jason Michael Palmer | 142 | 0.11 |
| President R. Boddie | 136 | 0.11 |
| Mark Stewart Greenstein | 133 | 0.11 |
| Bernie Sanders (write-in) (Ind.) | 125 | 0.10 |
| Terrisa Bukovinac | 101 | 0.08 |
| Gabriel Cornejo | 86 | 0.07 |
| Stephen P. Lyons | 80 | 0.06 |
| Frankie Lozada | 73 | 0.06 |
| Tom Koos | 71 | 0.06 |
| Armando "Mando" Perez-Serrato | 68 | 0.05 |
| Star Locke | 59 | 0.05 |
| Raymond Michael Moroz | 52 | 0.04 |
| Eban Cambridge | 47 | 0.04 |
| Richard Rist | 37 | 0.03 |
| Nikki Haley (write-in) (Republican) | 4,760 | 3.84 |
| Donald Trump (write-in) (Republican) | 2,079 | 1.68 |
| Chris Christie (write-in) (Republican) | 41 | 0.03 |
| Ron DeSantis (write-in) (Republican) | 33 | 0.03 |
| Vivek Ramaswamy (write-in) (Republican) | 2 | <0.01 |
| Other write-in votes, reported as "Scatter". | 1,341 | 1.08 |
| Total | 123,996 | 100% |

No delegates were awarded from the January New Hampshire primary.

== Personal life ==
Supreme grew up near Boston, Massachusetts, and is the oldest of three children. He graduated from Gloucester High School in 1979, then moved to Baltimore to attend the Maryland Institute College of Art. He eventually dropped out of college and began booking bands for underground music clubs.

He legally changed his name to Vermin Supreme in the 1990s while still in Baltimore.

In 2006, Supreme donated one of his kidneys to his mother, who was suffering from renal failure.

Supreme is married and has no children. He resides in Rockport, Massachusetts.

== See also ==
- List of frivolous political parties
- Pat Paulsen, often seen Presidential candidate
- Lord Buckethead, a British satirical candidate
- Screaming Lord Sutch, a satirical politician in the United Kingdom
- Count Binface, a British satirical candidate
- Rhinoceros Party, a satirical Canadian political party
- Situationism, an avant-garde social and political art movement which influenced Vermin Supreme
- Manuel João Vieira, musician/comedian satirically running for the Portuguese 2026 presidential election
- Tiririca, a professional clown who ran for and currently represents the state of São Paulo in Brazil
