= Billy Hughes egg-throwing incident =

1917 Australian political attack

Egg Throwing Incident
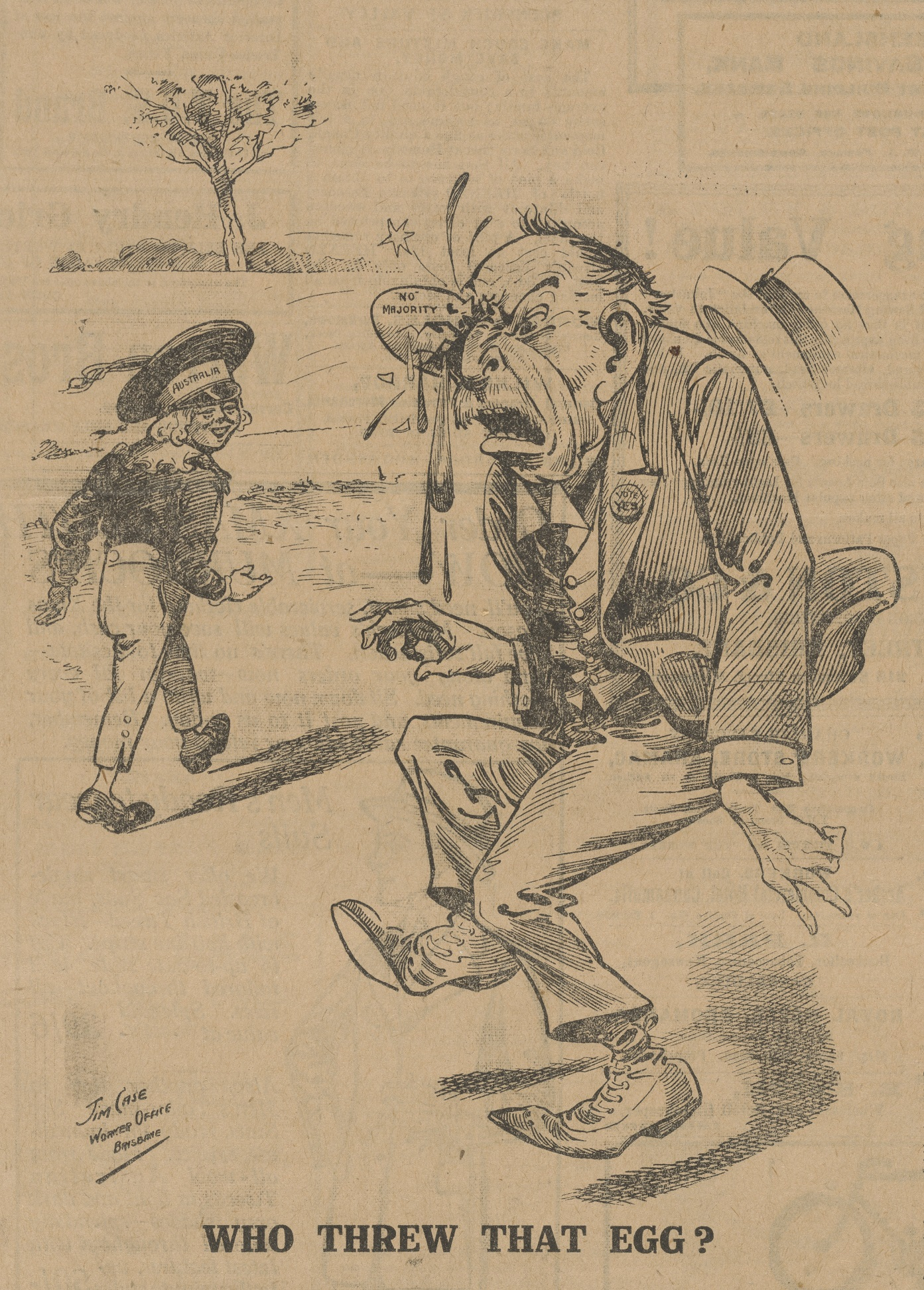
- "Who Threw That Egg?", a 1917 cartoon making reference to the incident.
- Date: 29 November 1917
- Location: Warwick, Queensland
- Caused by: Conscription
- Methods: Egging; Civil disobedience

On 29 November 1917, an egg was thrown at the Australian Prime Minister Billy Hughes at the Warwick railway station, Queensland, during his campaign for the 1917 plebiscite on conscription. The egg was thrown by Patrick Michael Brosnan, possibly assisted by his brother Bartie Brosnan.

== Background ==
Pressured by British leaders for increased Australian participation in the war effort, Labor Prime Minister Billy Hughes announced his intention to hold a national referendum on compulsory military conscription in October 1916. After a particularly bitter campaign, a majority of Australians voted against the proposal, the issue splitting the Federal Labor Party. After joining with the conservative Opposition to form a nationalist government in February 1917, Hughes resolved to hold a second conscription referendum the following December.

The campaign was just as volatile as the first, and with the Queensland Government under Premier T.J. Ryan strongly anti-conscription, Hughes decided to tour southern Queensland in a bid to whip up support for his cause.

== Warwick speech ==
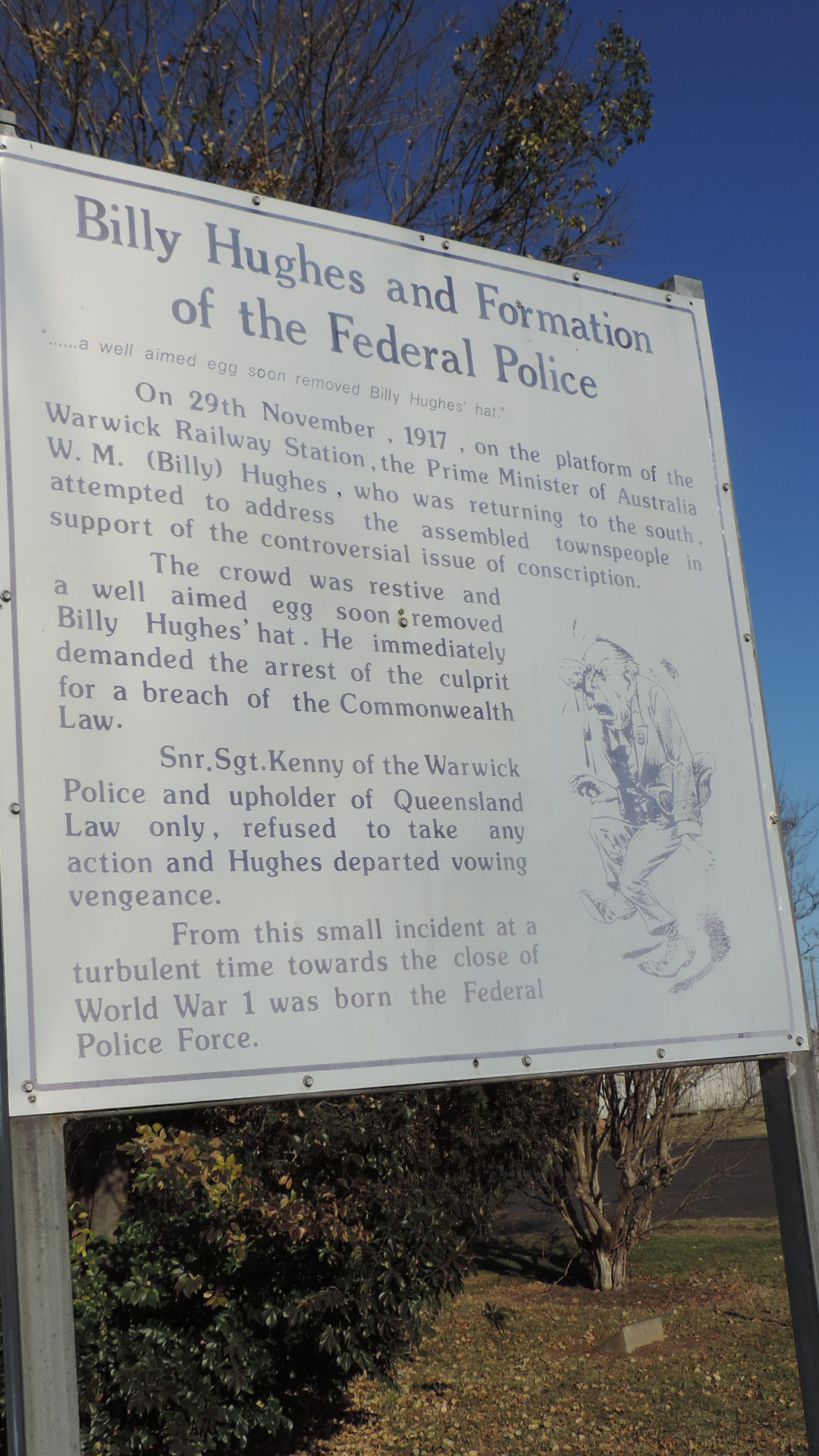
Information board about the incident, 2015

On 29 November 1917, Hughes attempted to give a speech to the people of Warwick at the local railway station. While Hughes spoke, an egg was hurled from the crowd and hit him on the head, knocking off his hat. Enraged, Hughes lunged into the crowd, reaching into his coat for a revolver but discovered it had been left in the railway carriage. Hughes demanded local police arrest the culprit for breaking Commonwealth law, but law enforcement refused the request of the prime minister. As a policeman of Warwick, Sergeant Kenny was only beholden to Queensland law, and told the prime minister "You have no jurisdiction".

== Aftermath ==
The Commonwealth Police were created shortly after the event, and could enforce federal law across the Commonwealth. There had been plans to create a similar entity for over a decade, and the egg throwing incident is considered a catalyst for its creation.

In November 2007, the 90th anniversary of the Warwick egg-throwing incident was celebrated with a re-enactment at Warwick railway station.

== See also ==
- Conscription in Australia
- Fraser Anning egg incident, another instance in which an Australian politician was egged
