= Inking (attack) =

Form of political protest in India

Inking or ink throwing is the act of throwing ink at people, or cars. It has been used as a form of political protest in India.

== Notable incidents ==
Main incidents include inking at Aam Aadmi Party leader Arvind Kejriwal (followed by a chilli powder attack) in 2016 and Swaraj Abhiyan party founder and former Aam Aadmi Party leader Yogendra Yadav in 2014. In 2015, Indian activist Sudheendra Kulkarni was hit by an ink attack by India's far-right Shiv Sena party members in a protest at former Pakistani foreign minister Khurshid Mahmud Kasuri's Neither a Hawk Nor a Dove book launch.

In 2018, black ink was thrown onto the face of Pakistan's Minister for Foreign Affairs, Khawaja Asif.

== See also ==
- Acid throwing
- Egging
- Milkshaking
- Pieing
- Shoe-throwing
- Toilet papering
- Zelyonka attack
