= GetEQUAL =

American nonprofit organization

- Formation: March 11, 2010
- Dissolved: April 2018; 8 years ago
- Headquarters: Washington, D.C.
- Director: Robin McGehee
- Website: GetEQUAL.org (archived)

GetEQUAL was, from 2010 to 2018, an American non-profit organization and advocacy group which advocates for LGBTQ social and political equality through confrontational but non-violent direct action.

== Mission statement ==
GetEQUAL's mission was as follows:

Our mission is to empower the lesbian, gay, bisexual, transgender, and queer (LGBTQ) community and our allies to take bold action to demand full legal and social equality, and to hold accountable those who stand in the way.

== Background ==
The organization was founded on March 11, 2010, by Robin McGehee of Jackson, Mississippi (she was a co-director of the National Equality March and the Meet in the Middle March 4 Equality, both of 2009), and Kip Williams of Knoxville, Tennessee as a nationwide alternative to other, older LGBT civil rights advocacy organizations such as the Human Rights Campaign.

GetEQUAL was envisioned as a group to establish the continuation of the message presented at the National Equality March which was to hold political leaders accountable for their campaign promises to the LGBT community as well as broaden this effort at the grassroots level. The message was a focus on recently elected officials in the presidency as well as the congressional leaders in power at the time which consisted of the Democratic house and senate majority leadership.

The organization was launched into the national spotlight when McGehee participated with Lt. Dan Choi and Captain Jim Pietrangelo in a March 18, 2010, protest on the sidewalk in front of the White House lawn; all three were arrested by Washington, D.C., police after handcuffing themselves to the White House fence. It has since protested against the don't ask, don't tell (DADT) policy of the United States military and in favor of ENDA and UAFA, neither of which have passed a congressional vote as of October 2010.

== Organizational actions ==
GetEQUAL issued travel alerts for LGBT travelers, particularly targeting places in which laws or government actions threaten to discriminate against or impact the safety of LGBT people. Local branches issued travel alerts for San Antonio (when, in 2013, the city council threatened unsuccessfully to strike down a municipal non-discrimination ordinance) and Mississippi (when, in 2014, the state legislature worked on a bill which would allow business owners to refuse service to customers on religious grounds).

== Timeline of major organizational events ==
- 3/18/2010: On the same date as the first handcuffing event by Lt. Dan Choi on March 18, a sit-in was being organized at House Speaker Nancy Pelosi's San Francisco office in a request for her to bring the ENDA to the floor for a vote due to a long time-line of delays and the failure of ENDA to come up again in the house or pass in the senate. Nancy Pelosi had brought the measure to pass the house in 2007 which died in the senate.
- 4/20/2010: Six military service members including one transsexual, Autumn Sandeen, repeated the protest of DADT, handcuffing themselves to the White House gates and were subsequently arrested.
- 7/20/2010: With ENDA being a high priority goal that was appearing to slip away as the 2010 elections approached, GetEQUAL protested on Las Vegas Boulevard, holding up signs thus slowing down traffic as a plea for action to Sen. Harry Reid resulting in more arrests of protesters for causing the delay.
- 7/28/2010: Eight GetEQUAL activists shut down the Capitol Rotunda demanding Nancy Pelosi bring up ENDA for a vote. The protesters were arrested and released later that day.
- 9/30/2010: In Indianapolis on September 30, a local bakery, Just Cookies, refused to fill an order of rainbow cupcakes for National Coming Out Day on October 7 and was protested by GetEQUAL on October 11 for what was at first an insistence by owners that they reserved the right to deny service based on their personal moral values but which was found to be in possible violation of the city's anti-discrimination ordinance after which they made a statement basing their refusal on the volume of the order despite having filled orders many times the size of this order in the past and having 8 days to fill the order. The protesters were met with some who patronized the bakery in response to the protest while others decided to refuse patronage as interviewed by the IndyChannel 6 News station.
- 10/11/2010: As the 2010 elections approached, a District court judge, Virginia Phillips of the Central District of California, ruled in favor of the Log Cabin Republicans against the DADT policy declaring it unconstitutional. President Barack Obama, having the Justice Department under his administration would be responsible for the appeal and pursuit of the policy or its revocation. On October 11, local activists lined the street with signs and used air horns and released balloon clusters with banners during a DNC fund raising event at the home of NBA basketball player Alonzo Mourning where President Barack Obama would be speaking. Crews from the local news media were tipped off to the protest and covered the event. Soon after this, a marine was considering re-enlistment and was denied on video. This video was picked up by the New York Times and MSNBC and the next day, President Obama had made a statement that DADT would be lifted which the Pentagon agreed to adhere to while waiting for appeal. However, on October 20, 2010, the Ninth Circuit Court of Appeals granted the Justice Department an emergency request to allow the policy to continue until appeal is resolved.
- 11/11/2010: Given that there is a new Republican majority in the House of Representatives, GetEQUAL creates a new strategy that looks at holding detractors and new leadership responsible as well as engaging in more bipartisan efforts that reflect majority opinions that have percentages well above that needed to pass LGBT legislation.
- March 2018 : GetEQUAL announces its closure. The group was dealing with social media conflict over the firing of its Movement Building and Campaign Manager, Aaryn Lang, loss of members of its board of directors, and a shortage of cash.

== Public and LGBT community reaction ==
While many events have resulted in arrests for minor misdemeanors, the general public and news media have taken increasing notice of their activities and have often resulted in responses made by congressional leaders with some local success.

Within the LGBT community, critics have objected to the tactics of GetEQUAL as annoyances that may hurt the LGBT cause by criticizing the political party they view as having done most everything politically possible with the way politics actually operate from a pragmatic viewpoint. GetEQUAL has addressed these critics by clarifying the expectations being requested by leaders and addressing it from the viewpoint of promises and statements made by these leaders even though they may not have had the actual capability of fulfilling them. More recently, they have engaged these leaders in meetings where possible and when allowed.

Supporters in the LGBT community support the efforts to remind people of LGBT issues—feeling that the majority are still unaware of many LGBT issues like continued lack of work protections and the forgetting of broken promises made by politicians.

The organization's more recent activities, even before the election have quelled some of these criticisms within the community by addressing politicians like republican Senator John McCain in Arizona demonstrating their focus on LGBT rights and holding the current leadership and obstructionists accountable, regardless of party. After the 2010 congressional elections, media attention increased due to the apparent dissatisfaction by lower LGBT voter turnout and an ongoing emphasis of DADT repeal was combined with the Trevor Project's It Gets Better Project.

Once considered a wedge issue, DADT is now considered to hold out some promise as a bipartisan pilot issue that may gain traction on other needed and critical civil liberties such as equal employment rights, equal tax deductions, and granting stop gap solutions for families separated solely based on their LGBT identity.

== See also ==
- LGBT rights in the United States
- List of LGBT rights organizations
