= COLAGE =

LGBT organization in North America

- COLAGE logo
- Founded: 1990
- Type: LGBTQ, peer support group, virtual organization
- Location: online
- Key people: Jordan Wilson (né Budd)
- Website: colage.org
- Formerly called: Just for Us, Children of Lesbians and Gays Everywhere

COLAGE (abbreviated from Children of Lesbians and Gays Everywhere) is an organizational community of peers and mentors that offers resources for youth with LGBTQ+ parents. Established in 1990, COLAGE is operated by people of all ages with LGBTQ guardians, who mentor younger members in preparation for challenges that children may face having queer parents.

== History ==
COLAGE is the first organization of its kind and was originally called Just for Us. Just for Us began as a newsletter of the main six members of COLAGE. Later, six other chapters around the United States adopted that name. The ancestry of COLAGE can be tracked to an annual conference that is sponsored each year by Gay and Lesbian Parents Coalition International (GLPCI). In 1992, the group met for three days, outside of its annual meeting, to compose a mission statement and long-term goals. Amity Buxton represented the Straight Spouse Network (SSN), which has close relations with the Family Pride Coalition (FPC), at the conference and gave presentations for the GLPCI/FPC concerning her heading of the Task Force for children through PFLAG (Parents and Friends of Lesbians and Gays). Her presentation proved successful in contributing to the origins of COLAGE.

In 1995, COLAGE opened a volunteer-run national office in San Francisco. This office operated for the primary purpose of providing "support, research, media, and advocacy" for over 500 families on a mailing list of children with LGBT parents. Beginning in 1996, COLAGE included children of transgender parents and designed specific resources not available anywhere else.

In 1997, the organization had their first director on payroll with a minuscule budget. The director, along with a determined team of youth-led volunteer committees, was able to commence a nationwide campaign that would allow them to hire another staff member in 1999.

Every summer COLAGE comes to Family Pride's annual Family Week in Provincetown on Cape Cod. There, hundreds of families attend COLAGE meetings and workshops.

== Advocacy ==
In the United States, there are 6 million children who have at least queer parent or guardian, and within these values anywhere from one to nine million children are currently being raised in households with two or more queer parents or guardians. Children within these households face several challenges and the ability to cope with their situation can often be overwhelming. COLAGE serves these children in several ways with peer support and community-building.

The process for children to become comfortable with their lifestyle is often disrupted by outside influences such as "negative portrayals, misinformation, and the constant public debate about LGBT rights." Another purpose of COLAGE is addressing the burden of a lack of benefits or protections for LGBT families with children. COLAGE also opposes negative media concerning mental health impacts to children of LGBT parents and guardians.

=== Youth Leadership and Public Education ===
This program of COLAGE aims to "connect constituents with media and public speaking opportunities empowering them to produce authentic representations of their experiences." YLAP (Youth Leadership and Action Program) was a COLAGE program designed to support public education and advocacy efforts for the children with LGBT parents and guardians by creating high quality arts activism materials. In 2005, the YLAP members completed In My Shoes: Stories of Youth with GLBT Parents, a documentary that profiles several adolescents with their stories, unique experiences, and opinions about non-traditional marriages. This film is used as an educational tool in youth outreach across the US, educating the general public, and influencing school policies and legislation at the state and federal levels. In My Shoes: Stories of Youth with LGBT Parents won the Audience Award for Best Short at the Frameline Film Festival and is now distributed to classrooms and communities nationwide.

=== Advocacy and Youth Organizing ===
This program of COLAGE aims directly "provide tools, training, and information to engage effectively in public policy development." COLAGErs have been brought up by helping youth from an early age develop "self-awareness to social awareness to civic and political advocacy." Specifically for this program area, a staff-led organization researches and advocates for COLAGE. In 2004, this organization "created and distributed a state-by-state guide of issues directly affecting GLBT people and families."

== See also ==
- PFLAG
