= Milkshaking =

Throwing milkshakes at people as protest

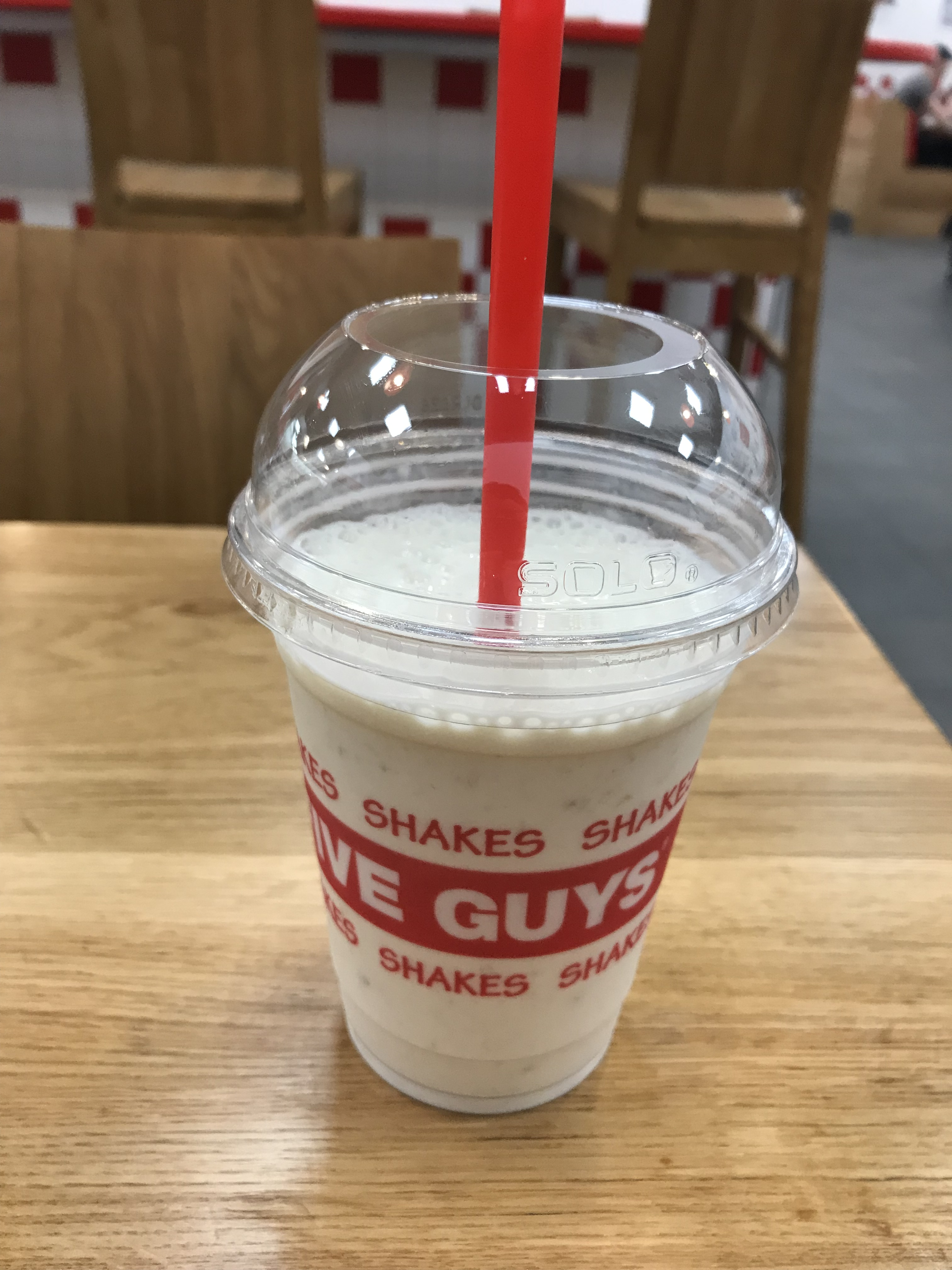
A milkshake served in a disposable container

Milkshaking is the act of throwing milkshakes and other drinks at targets as a means of political protest in a manner similar to egging or pieing. The target of a milkshaking is splashed or splattered with a milkshake that is thrown from a cup or bottle. The trend gained momentum in the United Kingdom in May 2019 during the European Parliament election and was used against the far-right activist Tommy Robinson and right-wing political candidates such as Nigel Farage and Carl Benjamin, as well as other members of the UK Independence Party (UKIP) and the Brexit Party (now Reform UK).

== History ==
The practice and its use in targeting right-wing politicians is believed to have gained popularity following the egging of far-right, anti-immigrant, anti-Muslim politician Fraser Anning in Australia by a teenager in March 2019, which was met with a violent response from Anning. However, one of earliest known renditions of the practice took place on 30 September 2016 when Moldova's finance minister Octavian Armașu had a bucket of milk thrown at him by protestor Andrei Donică outside the Moldovan parliament in Chișinău.

In 2019, British far-right activist Tommy Robinson was "milkshaked", having one thrown as a projectile in Bury on 1 May 2019, and another thrown the following day in Warrington while campaigning. Robinson responded to the second incident by punching the milkshake thrower, who said he had thrown the dessert in response to harassment from Robinson and his supporters. Since the event, the thrower said he had received death threats on social media. UKIP candidate Carl Benjamin was milkshaked four times that month while campaigning in Salisbury, Truro, and Totnes.

Brexit Party leader Nigel Farage had a Five Guys milkshake thrown over him in Newcastle upon Tyne on 20 May 2019 by a 32-year-old Brexit opponent, who was arrested by police at the scene for common assault. Farage later blamed the rise of milkshaking on "radicalised Remainers" and said that it disrupted campaigning. A spoof JustGiving campaign was set up to crowdfund the purchase of a new suit for Farage following the milkshaking, while instead donating its proceeds to a cancer charity. A few days later, Farage was reportedly trapped on his campaign bus after arriving in Kent to speak to supporters, as a group of people holding milkshakes watched nearby. In June 2019, Farage's milkshaker pleaded guilty to common assault and criminal damage to Farage's microphone, and was given 150 hours of unpaid work and ordered to pay £520. An online fundraiser raised more than £650 to cover this cost, within hours of sentencing.

A McDonald's restaurant in Edinburgh was asked by local police to stop selling milkshakes during Nigel Farage's campaign visit in May 2019. Burger King responded on Twitter by advertising its milkshakes in Scotland. The act in general was criticised by several political commentators, including former Prime Minister Tony Blair, for being a gateway to political violence, while others argued it was harmless protesting.

In anticipation of U.S. President Donald Trump's state visit to the United Kingdom in June 2019, the group "Milkshakes Against Racism" organised a gathering at Trafalgar Square to greet him with milkshakes as a symbol of protest. A pro-Trump supporter was struck in the face by a milkshake during protests on 4 June.

U.S. Congressman Matt Gaetz was reported to have been the first U.S. politician to be milkshaked, at a town hall event in Pensacola, Florida in June 2019, but the drink was later described as an unidentified "red liquid" by police.

Right-wing activist Andy Ngo was sprayed with Silly String by antifascists in Portland, Oregon on 30 June 2019, before also having a milkshake thrown at him. Portland police initially tweeted that they had received reports of a milkshake containing quick-drying cement, which was widely transmitted although no proof of these claims was presented and the claim has been generally treated as a hoax. The Portland Police Bureau later said that the tweet had been made after an officer had observed a cement-like powder on at least one milkshake cup. This claim was investigated by Willamette Week, which found that police had no physical evidence of any such thing occurring, and that no journalist had published any photo evidence or witness reports of such an activity. Ngo sued three people for the attack, and received a $300,000 judgement after the defendants did not appear in court, resulting in a default ruling.

On 27 September 2019, Justin Barrett, leader of the Irish far-right National Party, was milkshaked in Galway. In the wake of the incident, the student who threw the milkshake at Barrett reportedly received targeted abuse and threats from far-right extremists. In September 2020, a smoothie was thrown at the Irish Tánaiste Leo Varadkar by an unknown person. Varadkar remarked that he thought he was being approached by Avril Lavigne. The Irish Council for Civil Liberties voiced concern after it was revealed that the Garda Síochána were engaged in the profiling of left-wing activist women in an attempt to identify the assailant.

In June 2024, whilst campaigning as Reform UK's candidate in the Clacton constituency for the 2024 general election Nigel Farage was hit with a McDonald's banana milkshake thrown by a 25-year-old woman who was later arrested.

== Analysis and ethics ==
The wave of milkshaking incidents in 2019 prompted discussion in the media regarding the reasons for it being adopted as a protest tactic and whether or not it was ethically justifiable. Philosopher Benjamin Franks suggested that the use of particular foodstuffs in political protest had historically been a practical matter, noting that whilst "nowadays, carrying raw eggs to a nationalist meeting would require some backstory to justify it if challenged by the police", until recently carrying a milkshake would not have aroused the same suspicion. He also argued that milkshaking "is clearly effective in making the victim feel uncomfortable and look ridiculous".

Ivan Gololobov, a politics academic at the University of Bath, highlighted the importance of "online follow-up" to modern protest politics, observing that milkshaking someone who was attempting to portray themselves as a serious and credible political figure was an effective way of undercutting their image. Writing for Vice, Jazmine Sleman suggested that milkshaking was a form of dilemma action which created "a lose-lose situation for the opposition... because there's no good way to respond to a milkshaking". The New Republic's Matt Ford said that milkshaking was effective against far right leaders due to its potential for humiliating them: "nothing animates the far right or shapes its worldview quite so much as the desire to humiliate others—and the fear of being humiliated themselves".

Regarding the milkshaking of Farage, Liberal Democrat Tim Farron tweeted that "Violence and intimidation are wrong no matter who they're aimed at. On top of that, it just makes the man a martyr, it's playing into his hands". Writing for The Independent, Kate Townshend said that whilst she was opposed to far right politics, "on the one hand, nobody should have to walk around in fear of having things thrown at them, but on the other, a temporarily milky face is also just not a satisfying redress". Josh Marshall wrote for Talking Points Memo that whilst he understood why the tactic had caught on, he disagreed with the practice, partly because he "wouldn't find it funny at all" if far right protestors milkshaked or pied liberal politicians, but also because "we place a great deal of societal importance on creating a line between words and physical autonomy... It's an impulse we shouldn't set aside simply because we find someone loathsome". Ricky Gervais tweeted that whilst he was pro-Remain, he was opposed to throwing items at people he disagreed with: "that would mean I had run out of good arguments. It would also mean I deserve a smack in the mouth".

Brendan Cox, the widower of the murdered anti-Brexit Labour MP Jo Cox, said that whilst he opposed Farage's politics, he believed that throwing objects at political opponents "normalises violence and intimidation and we should consistently stand against it".

Some observers took issue with the characterisation of milkshaking as an act of violence. Writing for the New Statesman, Jonn Elledge argued that "it is far less violent than, say, promising to 'pick up a rifle' if Brexit is not delivered", as Farage had done in 2017, and that "the idea that throwing a milkshake is violence, but that inciting hate against minority groups isn't, is responsible for a decent-sized chunk of all the world's political problems". Alexander Blanchard, a researcher at Queen Mary University of London, argued that milkshaking did not constitute violence, as "by nearly all accounts, political violence entails intentionally inflicting harm", whereas according to those involved in milkshaking, they at most aimed to humiliate their targets. He also highlighted the history of using "small and harmless projectiles" like eggs to being a sense of theatricality to political campaigning in Britain, holding that acts of milkshaking did not exceed this level of controversy.

Dan Kaszeta, a London-based security consultant who previously worked for the White House Military Office and the United States Secret Service, took issue with Sam Harris' claim that milkshakings were "mock assassinations", stating: "Acts of political protest happen. Acts of political violence happen. There is some overlap between the two. But throwing a milkshake, while fundamentally inappropriate, uncivil, and possibly criminal... isn't the same thing as throwing a brick or shooting a rifle". Similarly, after Robinson was milkshaked, Conservative MP Johnny Mercer stated that "this is not political violence... It is a milkshake". Muntadhar al-Zaidi, the journalist who threw his shoes at U.S. President George W. Bush, said, "Not many people are prepared to be jailed or tortured or face consequences for those types of actions" but did not consider milkshaking violent.

== See also ==
- Egging – Throwing eggs at people or property
- Flour bomb – Form of protest
- Pieing – Throwing a pie at a person or people
- Zelyonka attack – Form of political protest in Russia and Ukraine
