= Anti-sweatshop movement =

Campaigns to improve the conditions of workers in sweatshops

People working in a sweatshop

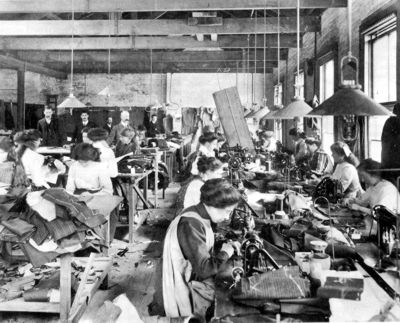
A sweatshop in the United States circa 1890

Protesters stand outside the Primark shop on Oxford Street with SWEATSHOP SHAME banner

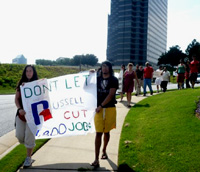
Members of United Students Against Sweatshops marching in protest

The anti-sweatshop movement refers to campaigns to improve the conditions of workers in sweatshops. It started in the 19th century in industrialized countries such as the United States, Australia, New Zealand and the United Kingdom to improve the conditions of workers in those countries. These campaigns are meant to improve the working conditions through advocacy for higher wages, safer conditions, unionization and other protections.

Consumers can use their buying decisions to further the anti-sweatshop movement.

== History ==
=== 19th and early 20th centuries ===
Some of the earliest sweatshop critics were found in the 19th-century abolitionist movement that had originally coalesced in opposition to chattel slavery, and many abolitionists saw similarities between slavery and sweatshop work. As slavery was successively outlawed in industrial countries between 1794 (in France) and 1865 (in the United States), some abolitionists sought to broaden the anti-slavery consensus to include other forms of harsh labor, including sweatshops. As it happened, the first significant law to address sweatshops (the Factory Act 1833) was passed in the United Kingdom at the same time that the slave trade (1807) and ownership of slaves (1833) were made illegal.

Ultimately, the abolitionist movement split apart. Some advocates focused on working conditions and found common cause with trade unions and Marxists and socialist political groups, or progressive movement and the muckrakers. Others focused on the continued slave trade and involuntary servitude in the colonial world. For those groups that remained focused on slavery, sweatshops became one of the primary objects of controversy. Workplaces across multiple sectors of the economy were categorized as sweatshops. However, there were fundamental philosophical disagreements about what constituted slavery. Unable to agree on the status of sweatshops, the abolitionists working with the League of Nations and the United Nations ultimately backed away from efforts to define slavery, and focused instead on a common precursor of slavery including human trafficking.

Those focused on working conditions included Friedrich Engels, whose book The Condition of the Working Class in England in 1844 would inspire the Marxist movement named for his collaborator, Karl Marx. In the United Kingdom the Factory Act was revised six further times between 1844 and 1878 to help improve the condition of workers by limiting work hours and the use of child labor. The formation of the International Labour Organization in 1919 under the League of Nations and then the United Nations sought to address the plight of workers the world over. Concern over working conditions as described by muckraker journalists during the Progressive Era in the United States saw the passage of new workers rights laws and ultimately resulted in the Fair Labor Standards Act of 1938, passed during the New Deal.

The anti-sweatshop movement successfully utilized investigative journalism to mobilize the middle class on a range of worker rights. Prominent reformers include Samuel Plimsoll, Lord Shaftesbury Anthony Ashley-Cooper, Henry Mayhew, Upton Sinclair, and Robert M. La Follette.

=== Late 20th century to present ===
Beginning in 1997, several jurisdictions passed laws requiring government suppliers to be sweatshop-free.

In 2004, the resolution of the lawsuit against Forever 21 and the settlement of the lawsuit against Bebe Stores was a triumphant turning point for the anti-sweatshop movement because local laws could be used to hold a retailer to account.

By 2009, clothing and footwear factories overseas have progressively improved working conditions because of the high demand of anti-sweatshop movement labor rights advocates.

In the 2010s, social media was used to advance the anti-sweatshop movement.

In May 2017, Mama Cash and The Clean Clothes Campaign, both organizations that are working towards abolishing sweatshops as well as creating a world of sustainable and ethical apparel practices, worked together to create The Women Power Fashion Pop-up. The event took place in Amsterdam and allowed consumers to sit in a room designed to look and feel like a sweatshop and were forced to create 100 ties in an hour which is synonymous to that of the expectations of women working in sweatshops today. This pop-up allowed consumers to actually experience the life of a sweatshop worker for a limited time and thus made them more sympathetic to the cause. Outside of the pop-up was a petition that consumers could sign to convince brands to be more transparent with their clothing manufacturing processes. The campaign went viral and created a significant buzz for the anti-sweatshop movement as well as the work of Mama Cash and The Clean Clothes Campaign.

In China, the minimum wage was raised by approximately 7% in 10 provinces in 2019 with the goal of improving living conditions.

== Effectiveness of campaigns on sales and stock prices ==
A study published in 2011 found that while in most cases anti-sweatshop movements did not affect sales for companies using sweatshops, they did correspond with a decrease in the sales of well-known, more specialized brands and more intense movements caused more significant reduction in the sales. The same study also found that anti-sweatshop events also seemed to correspond with lower stock prices for the companies that were the target of these events, though some major anti-sweatshop events such as the Kaksy lawsuit against Nike, did not result in any discernible change in stock price of the targeted company. The study found that 64.1% of the companies targeted by anti-sweatshop movements saw drops in stock price in the five days following the anti-sweatshop event, and 56.4% saw drops in the two days following the event. Though the study did find these slight negative economic effects, it did not find that, when taking into account companies of all reputations, anti-sweatshop movements or events damaged the reputation of the companies they targeted to a statistically significant degree; however, there does seem to be a slight undercutting of the reputations of companies with positive reputations when they are faced with anti-sweatshop campaigns, particularly intense ones.

== Ability to replace jobs if sweatshops are shut ==
A major issue for the anti-sweatshop movement is the fate of workers displaced if sweatshops are closed. This was an issue when, after the Rana Plaza collapse led to the shutdown of many sweatshops in Bangladesh, the affected employees were not able to get replacement jobs. In many cases, workers turned to sex work after they lost their jobs.

In late 2001, 100,000 sweatshop workers in Bangladesh were laid off. The workers petitioned their government to lobby the U.S. government to repeal its trade barriers so that they can go back to their sweatshop jobs.

== Activities ==
The National Labor Committee brought sweatshops into the mainstream media in the 1990s when it exposed the use of sweatshop and child labor to sew clothing for Kathie Lee Gifford's Walmart label.

United Students Against Sweatshops is active on college campuses.

The International Labor Rights Fund filed a lawsuit on behalf of workers in China, Nicaragua, Swaziland, Indonesia, and Bangladesh against Wal-Mart charging the company with knowingly developing purchasing policies particularly relating to price and delivery time that are impossible to meet while following the Wal-Mart code of conduct.

Labor unions, such as the AFL–CIO, have helped support the anti-sweatshop movement out of concern both for the welfare of workers in the developing world and those in the United States.

== Arguments ==
Proponents of the anti-sweatshop movement cite examples where sweatshops have reduced living standards and wages.

They believe that better-paying jobs, increased capital investment and domestic ownership of resources will improve economies, rather than sweatshops.

Sometimes local jobs offered higher wages before trade liberalization provided tax incentives to allow sweatshops to replace former local unionized jobs.

Opponents also argue that sweatshop jobs are not necessarily inevitable.

Éric Toussaint claims that quality of life in developing countries was actually higher between 1945 and 1980 before the Latin American debt crisis harmed economies in developing countries causing them to turn to IMF and World Bank-organized "structural adjustments" and that unionized jobs pay more than sweatshop jobs.

People critical of sweatshops believe that "free trade agreements" do not truly promote free trade at all but instead seek to protect multinational corporations from competition by local industries (which are sometimes unionized). They believe free trade should only involve reducing tariffs and barriers to entry and that multinational businesses should operate within the laws in the countries they want to do business in rather than seeking immunity from obeying local environmental and labor laws. They believe these conditions are what give rise to sweatshops rather than natural industrialization or economic progression.

== Hinderances to the anti-sweatshop movement ==
=== Apathy due to distance ===
While the Triangle Shirtwaist Factory fire in 1911 galvanized the population to political activism that eventually pushed through reforms not only pertaining to workplace safety, but also the minimum wage, the eight-hour day, workers' compensation, Social Security the Clean Air Act, and the Clean Water Act, the same did not happen after the Rana Plaza collapse, according to Erik Loomis, mainly because most consumers are too far from Bangladesh to be outraged.

=== Corruption and poor worker education ===
Many sweatshop laborers have lost autonomy and corporations have gained in their invincibility to anti-sweatshop laws within a particular country. Corporations have the ability to move their production to another country when the laws become too restricting. Many sweatshop movements have begun to see "worker internationalization" as one of the only viable solutions; however, this requires strong labor movements, sufficient resources, and a commitment to mobilizing all workers, including women, which can be difficult to do at an international scale, as has been the case in the Americas.

Government corruption, inadequate labour protection legislation, and weak law enforcement has led to the establishment of sweatshops in certain countries.

These circumstances allow factories to provide dangerous working conditions for workers. According to the Corruption Perception Index 2016 (2017), countries with a high risk of corruption such as Bangladesh, Vietnam, India, Pakistan and China are reported to have larger numbers of unsafe garment factories operating inside the countries.

In Dubai, some labour camps do not have proper conditions for workers. If workers protest, they can be deported if they are foreigners.

Many workers in developing countries are ignorant about their rights because of their low education levels. Most of sweatshops are located in countries that have low education levels. Most of them do not know about their rights, such as matters about wages and supposed working conditions, thus they have no skill set to fight for their labour rights through collective bargaining (such as strikes or work to rule). Their lack of knowledge makes it hard for them to improve working conditions on their own.

== Corporate use of sweatshops and responses to the anti-sweatshop movement ==
Brands that used sweatshops as of 2023 included Shein, Nike, H&M, Zara, Disney Consumer Products, and Victoria's Secret. Brands that used sweatshops as of 2011 included GAP, Abercrombie & Fitch, Banana Republic, and others.

In 2014, Apple was caught "failing to protect its workers" in one of its Pegatron factories. Overwhelmed workers were caught falling asleep during their 12-hour shifts and an undercover reporter had to work 18 days in a row. Sweatshops in question carry characteristics such as compulsory pregnancy tests for female laborers and terrorization from supervisors into submission. Workers then go into a state of forced labor, and if even one day of work is not accounted for they could be immediately fired. These working conditions have been the source of suicidal unrest within factories in the past. Chinese sweatshops known to have increased numbers of suicidal employees have suicide nets covering the whole site, in place to stop overworked and stressed employees from leaping to their deaths, such as in the case of the Foxconn suicides.

In 2015, anti-sweatshop protesters protested against Uniqlo in Hong Kong. Along with the Japanese anti-sweatshops organisation Human Rights Now, the Hong Kong labour organisation Students and Scholars Against Corporate Misbehaviour (SACOM) protested the "harsh and dangerous" working conditions in Uniqlo's value-added factories in China. According to a report published by SACOM in 2015, Uniqlo’s suppliers were blamed for "systematically underpaying their labour, forcing them to work excessive hours and subjecting them to unsafe working conditions, which included sewage-covered floors, poor ventilation, and sweltering temperatures".

H&M has faced controversial issues and backlash regarding sweatshops in Asian countries. H&M is the largest producer of clothing, with sweatshop factories in under-developed South Asian and Southeast Asian countries like India, Bangladesh and Cambodia. 500 employees in Indonesia left their work and protested for higher pay as their pay was below the country's minimum wage. Once a strike evolved, the factory removed their access to the building and paid men to harass the workers.

According to the 2016 Clean Clothes Campaign, H&M strategic suppliers in Bangladesh were reported for dangerous working environments, which lacked vital equipment for workers and adequate fire exits.

In 2020, auditors uncovered a large chain of factories in Leicester producing clothes for Boohoo.com that were only paying their workers between £3-4. The conditions of the factories were described as terrible and workers received "illegally low pay".

Adidas was criticized for its Indonesian sweatshops in 2000, and accused of underpayment, overtime working, physical abuse and child labour.

In 2023, Nike, Inc. received backlash over its use of sweatshops. Over 4,000 Nike garment employees were allegedly not paid $2.2 million in owed wages for over three years. This accrual of unpaid wages spanned from the Violet Apparel factory in Cambodia to the Hong Seng Knitting Factory in Thailand, and many human rights organizations called Nike out on their violations against laborers.

Nike was the target of anti-sweatshop protests organised by the United Students Against Sweatshops (USAS) in Boston, Washington D.C., Bangalore, and San Pedro Sula. Protestors claimed that workers in Nike's contract factory in Vietnam were suffering from wage theft, verbal abuse and harsh working conditions with "temperatures over the legal limit of 90 degrees". Since the 1990s, Nike has been reported to employ sweat factories and child labour. Nike established an independent department which aimed to improve workers’ livelihoods in 1996. It was renamed the Fair Labor Association in 1999, as a non-profit organisation which includes representatives from companies, human rights organizations, and labour unions to work on the monitoring and management of labour rights.

=== Corporate codes of conduct ===
A study of corporate codes of conduct in the apparel industry by the U.S. Department of Labor in 1996 concluded that corporate codes of conduct that monitor labor norms in the apparel industry, rather than boycott or eliminate contracts upon the discovery of violations of internationally recognized labor norms, are a more effective way to eliminate child labor and the exploitation of children, provided they provide for effective monitoring that includes the participation of workers and their knowledge of the standards to which their employers are subject.

Nike has published annual sustainable business reports since 2001 and annual corporate social responsibility reports continuously since 2005, mentioning its commitments, standards and audits.

== Sweatshop-free ==

Although the definition varies, sweatshop-free or sweat free generally refers to coercion-free, fair-compensation and treatment for garment workers who manufacture products in good working conditions without the use of sweatshops. Sweatshop-free standards include the right to collective bargaining, non-poverty wages, safe workplaces, and no harassment.

Brands that claim to be sweatshop-free include American Apparel, Patagonia, Inc., and Everlane.

Jurisdictions that require their suppliers to be sweatshop-free include North Olmsted, Ohio (since 1997), Los Angeles (since 2005), San Francisco (since 2005), and Portland, Oregon (since 2008).

=== #WhoMadeMyClothes ===
The #WhoMadeMyClothes hashtag was launched in 2013 by Fashion Revolution co-founders, Carry Somers and Orsola de Castro. Celebrities including Emma Watson, Kelly Slater, and Fernanda Paes Leme used the hashtag on Twitter to support the issue.

To promote the hashtag in 2015, Fashion Revolution posted a video to YouTube titled "The 2 Euro T-Shirt - A Social Experiment". The video showed a vending machine selling T-shirts for €2. When people went to purchase the shirt, a video played describing the working conditions in which the shirt was made. By the end, people chose to donate to the cause of increasing supply chain transparency instead of buying the T-shirt.

== See also ==
- Child labour – Exploitation of children through work
- Craftivism – Form of activism centered on practices of craft
- Nicholas D. Kristof – American journalist and political commentator (born 1959)
- National Anti-Sweating League – Historical groups of labor organisations in Australia and the UK
- National Labor Committee in Support of Human and Worker Rights – Non-governmental organization

=== Prominent campaigners ===
- Lady Astor – British politician (1879–1964)
- Alfred Deakin – Australian statesman (1856–1919)
- Alfred George Gardiner – English journalist, editor and author (1865–1946)
- Vida Goldstein – Australian suffragist and social reformer (1869–1949)
- Florence Kelley – American activist (1859–1932)
- Charles Kernaghan – American activist (1948–2022)
- Mary Reid Macarthur – British labour organizer, editor (1880–1921)
- Samuel Mauger – Australian politician (1857-1936)
- R. H. Tawney – English philosopher (1880–1962)
- Rutherford Waddell – New Zealand Presbyterian minister and social reformer (1850–1932)

=== Organizations supporting the anti-sweatshop movement ===
- Clean Clothes Campaign
- Fashion Revolution – Not-for-profit social movement
- Free the Children – Canadian charity
- Global Exchange – US-based non-profit organization
- Green America – US non-profit organization
- Institute for Global Labour and Human Rights – Non-governmental organization
- International Labor Rights Forum – Nonprofit organization
- International Labour Organization – Specialized agency of the United Nations
- Rugmark – Indian non-profit organizations
- UNITE HERE – North American labor union
- United Students Against Sweatshops – United States student organization for worker rights
- Worker Rights Consortium – US labor rights organization
- China Labour Bulletin – Non-governmental organization
- Hong Kong Christian Industrial Committee
