= Alta Gracia Apparel =

- Company type: Manufacturer
- Industry: College emblem apparel
- Founder: Joe Bozich and Donnie Hodge
- Headquarters: Alta Gracia, Dominican Republic
- Products: T-shirts and sweatshirts
- Number of employees: 130
- Parent: DEH Holding
- Website: www.altagraciaapparel.com

Alta Gracia Apparel is a living wage apparel manufacturing company that sells licensed collegiate and professional sports apparel to university bookstores and online retailers. Their factory, located in Villa Altagracia, Dominican Republic is the first and only verified Living Wage company of its kind.

== History ==
The Alta Gracia factory opened in 2010 as a subsidiary of Knights Apparel. The company was founded with the promise to pays its employees a living wage, as established by the Workers Rights Consortium, for adequate food and shelter, which is about three and a half times the average income of apparel workers in the Dominican Republic. This Living Wage, which is established independently by the WRC (Worker's Rights Consortium) is set to provide a family of four the basic needs of housing, food, healthcare etc. The factory employs about 150 unionized people who, in 2013, made about $3 per hour, or $500 per month. This compares to the average wage in Bangladesh of $40 to $64 per month, according to a May 2013 survey reported by Reuters.

Alta Gracia is located in a former apparel sweatshop, that made baseball caps for Reebok and Nike until 2007. Its owner, BJ+B moved its clothing manufacture operations to Vietnam and Bangladesh where there were lower employment costs.

Offering workers a fair wage came as the result of co-founders Donnie Hodge and Joe Bozich's response to student concerns regarding conditions under which collegiate apparel were produced. The Workers Rights Consortium along with student activist groups like the United Students Against Sweatshops, and James Wilkerson, Director of Trademark Licensing and Stores Operations at Duke University, were early leaders in the movement.

In 2018, the company was acquired by AG Triada and moved headquarters to Atlanta, Georgia.

== Overview ==
Alta Gracia makes collegiate and professional logo apparel, selling at over 700 collegiate bookstores as well as through online retailers such as Fanatics. They are the only Living Wage Verified apparel company.

== See also ==
- United Students Against Sweatshops
- Workers Rights Consortium
