= Alta Gracia (disambiguation) =

Alta Gracia is a city in Córdoba Province, Argentina.

Alta Gracia may also refer to:

- Altagracia, a municipality in Rivas department, Nicaragua
- La Altagracia Province, Dominican Republic
- "Alta Gracia" (song), by Oscar Harris
- Alta Gracia Apparel

== See also ==
- Altagracia Mambrú
