= Designated Suppliers Program =

The Designated Suppliers Program (DSP) is a procurement standard proposed by the Worker Rights Consortium and United Students Against Sweatshops. The program was designed to promote the use by US universities of suppliers that make use of a defined set of fair labor practices. The DSP has undergone revisions to address feedback from universities and licensees. For instance, in October 2006, the WRC modified aspects of the program, such as removing the requirement that factories be unionized, to make it more adaptable and acceptable to a broader range of stakeholders.
