= Decent Working Conditions and Fair Competition Act =

The Decent Working Conditions and Fair Competition Act is the title of several bills that have been introduced in the United States Congress to try to "prohibit the import, export, and sale of goods made with sweatshop labor". As of February 2009, they have all died in committee and thus not become law.

== 109th Congress ==
In the 109th Congress (January 2005 to January 2007, both houses Republican), the Senate bill had number S 3485 and the house bill had number HR 5635. They both died in committee. The senate version was introduced by Byron Dorgan (D-ND) on June 8, 2006. The house version was introduced by Sherrod Brown (D-OH) on June 6, 2006.

The bill was written as a collaboration of different groups, including the United Steelworkers of America, the National Labor Committee and Senator Dorgan, partially in response to a Harris Poll showing that 75% of Americans agreed with the following statement: "I want my Member of Congress to support legislation to protect human rights in the global economy by prohibiting the import or sale of sweatshop goods in the U.S. which were made under conditions violating internationally recognized worker rights standards."

In September 2006, the bill had garnered four Senate co-sponsors and 33 co-sponsors in the House. It was also endorsed by the AFL–CIO

The bill aimed to ban the sale of any goods deemed to be made in contravention of either core International Labour Organization standards, including the right to organize and freedom of association, or of local labor laws. The bill's backers stated that the law was written specifically to ensure its compliance with World Trade Organization rules on non-discrimination, as the bill would have also banned the sale of any goods made in America under substandard conditions. Furthermore, endorsers claimed that the bill would have treated all goods equally and held all countries, including the United States, accountable for the conditions under which goods are made.

The contents of the bill can be found at the Library of Congress, or on their website at http://thomas.loc.gov/cgi-bin/query/z?c109:S.3485.IS:

House Representative Sherrod Brown, D OH, described the bill in these terms:

The bill is simple. It bars the importation or the sale of goods made with sweatshop labor. In other words, if a product is made in a Chinese sweatshop, if a product is made by child labor or slave labor or prison labor, you can't import it into the United States, you can't sell it into the United States

The Federal Trade Commission would enforce it, but the bill also gives retailers and shareholders the right to hold violators accountable, and it prohibits Federal government agencies from buying sweatshop goods. We can't afford to continue to tolerate these abuses. We certainly cannot afford, cannot continue to encourage them.

We don't have a $200 billion trade deficit with China because China's companies are better than ours and certainly not because their people are smarter or more dedicated or hard working. We know how China is able to do so well in the game of international trade. They break the rules. - House Floor, Jun 27 2006

... and on June 22, 2006, like this:

China is the world's sweatshop leader, with repressive labor policies resulting in wage suppression of as much as 85 percent. We all know that American workers can compete in a global economy on a level playing field, but no one can compete with prison labor, child labor or sweatshop labor. The result, a U.S. trade deficit with China that breaks records year after year, an increasing loss of U.S. manufacturing jobs to China. In my State alone, in Ohio, 42,000 jobs have been lost to China since the year 2001. Much of that job loss has been as a result of China's unfair trade practices. Yet America's trade agreements are actually encouraging the development of new sweatshops....

The bill bars the importation, the exportation or the sale of goods made with prisoner sweatshop labor. In other words, if a product is made by child labor or by forced prison camp labor, you can't import it into the United States, you can't sell it in the United States....

We cannot afford to continue to turn a blind eye to these abuses. Sweatshop imports are a moral crime. They violate the values of our families, of our faith and of the history of this country. They are a moral crime against the working men and women, and, I am afraid, working children of the developing nations.

Sweatshop imports are economic suicide for our country. As we import sweatshop goods, we export American jobs, we weaken the bargaining position of U.S. workers fighting for wages with which they can actually support their families.

The heart of America's economy has always been a vigorous middle-income consumer class. Henry Ford knew that. That is why he paid his workers a wage that would allow them to buy the cars that they made, to share the wealth they create, to buy the cars that they made.

By driving U.S. wages down, we weaken the American consumer market, we undercut our greatest economic power, and we lose jobs in so many of our communities....

=== 109th Congress – House version ===
HR 5635 died in committee, after being referred to a Committee. It was referred to these House committees:

- Ways and Means
- Armed Services
- Government Reform
- Rules
- Energy and Commerce
- International Relations

And the following subcommittee:

- House Energy and Commerce -- Subcommittee on Commerce, Trade and Consumer Protection

Sponsors

It was sponsored by Sherrod Brown D OH, and cosponsored by 60 other members, all Democrats.

=== 109th Congress – Senate version ===
S 3485 Died in committee, after being referred to the Senate Committee on Finance.

Members of that committee were:

- Max Baucus D MT Ranking
- Jay Rockefeller D WV
- Kent Conrad, D ND
- Jim Jeffords, I VT
- Jeff Bingaman, D NM
- John Kerry, D MA
- Blanche Lincoln, D AR
- Ron Wyden, D OR
- Charles Schumer, D NY
- Chuck Grassley R IA Chair
- Olympia Snowe, R MA
- Jon Kyl, R AZ
- Craig Thomas, R WY
- Rick Santorum, R PN
- Bill Frist, R TN
- Gordon Smith, R OR
- Jim Bunning, R KY
- Mike Crapo, R ID
- Orrin Hatch, R UT
- Trent Lott, R MS

The main sponsor was Byron Dorgan, D ND. Cosponsors were:

- Robert Menéndez [D-NJ]
- Harry Reid [D-NV]
- Russell Feingold [D-WI]
- Robert Byrd [D-WV]
- John Rockefeller [D-WV]

== 110th Congress ==
In the 110th United States Congress (Jan 2007 to Jan 2009, both houses Democratic), the Senate bill was S. 367, and the House bills were HR 1910 and HR 1992. They all died in committee.

=== 110th Congress – House version ===
There were two bills, HR 1910 and HR 1992. Sherrod Brown had become a Senator in the 2006 Elections and so did not introduce the House version.

HR 1910 was sponsored by Michael Michaud, D ME, and cosponsored by Christopher Smith, R NJ. It was introduced on Apr 18 2007.

HR 1992 was sponsored by Michael Michaud, D ME, and cosponsored by 167 Democrats and 7 Republicans. It was introduced on May 2, 2007.

HR 1992 went to the following House committees:

- Ways and Means
- Armed Services at the Wayback Machine (archived 2008-12-18)
- Government Reform at the Wayback Machine (archived 2008-12-18)
- Rules
- Energy and Commerce
- International Relations at the Wayback Machine (archived 2008-12-18)

And the following subcommittees:

- Energy and Commerce -- Subcommittee on Commerce, Trade and Consumer Protection

=== 110th Congress – Senate version ===
S 367 died in committee. The committees involved were the US Senate Committee on Commerce, Science, and Transportation, and the Subcommittee on Interstate Commerce, Trade, and Tourism.

A Republican Senator, Lindsey Graham (SC), joined in introducing the bill.

Byron Dorgan had this to say about the bill on January 29, 2007, in the Senate:

I think we could all agree that American workers should not have to compete against the product of prison labor in China. I think we could all agree that if somebody is making socks in a Chinese prison, that is not fair competition for an American worker. So we don't have Chinese prison labor products come into this country. What about the product of sweatshop labor, where people are brought into sweatshops?

I will cite an example: A sweatshop in northern Jordan, airplanes flying in the Chinese and Bangladeshis, with Chinese textiles, being put in sweatshops in northern Jordan to produce products to ship into this country. Some were working 40-hour shifts, not a 40-hour week, 40 hours at a time. Some weren't paid for months. And then when they were paid, they were paid a pittance. Some were beaten.

Do we want that kind of product coming into this country? Is that whom we want American workers to compete with? I don't think so. This legislation is a first baby step toward some sanity in trying to make sure that what we are purchasing on the store shelves in our country is not the product of sweatshop labor overseas. We define what sweatshop labor is, what sweatshop conditions are. We establish a provision by the Federal Trade Commission to enforce, and we also allow American companies who are forced to compete against this unfairness to take action in American courts to seek recompense for the damages.

On September 5: 2007:

... if we look at these issues in the context not of trying to destroy the advantages of a global economy but in the context of trying to make certain the protections we have developed for our country--protections that have allowed us to create a wonderful place in which to work and consume--if we can, with respect to our participation in the global economy, raise standards rather than lower ours – if we can do that, then we will have done something significant. But that is not what has been happening. What has been happening in this country is a race to the bottom, and a rush to embrace the refrain by some who want to produce where it is cheap and sell here and run their income through the Cayman Islands to avoid paying taxes, and they say, You know, we don't want any more regulations. I understand that. They want to avoid regulations. They want to avoid paying a decent wage. They want to go to offshore manufacturing platforms some place and produce little bracelets with little hearts that are made with 99 percent lead to ship into this country. That doesn't work. It won't work anymore. Somehow, as a country, we have to find a way to stop it.

Committee members

Members of the Committee on Commerce, Science, and Transportation were:

- Daniel Inouye D-HI, chair
- Jay Rockefeller D-WV
- John Kerry D-MA
- Byron Dorgan D-ND
- Barbara Boxer D-CA
- Bill Nelson D-FL
- Maria Cantwell D-WA
- Frank Lautenberg D-NJ
- Mark Pryor D-AR
- Tom Carper D-DE
- Claire McCaskill D-MO
- Amy Klobuchar D-MN
- Kay Bailey Hutchison R-TX, ranking
- John McCain R-AZ
- Trent Lott R-MS
- Ted Stevens R-AK
- Olympia Snowe R-ME
- Gordon H. Smith R-OR
- John Ensign R-NV
- John E. Sununu R-NH
- Jim DeMint R-SC
- David Vitter R-LA
- John Thune R-SD

Members of the Subcommittee on Interstate Commerce, Trade, and Tourism were:

- Byron Dorgan D-ND, chair
- Jay Rockefeller D-WV
- John Kerry D-MA
- Barbara Boxer D-CA
- Maria Cantwell D-WA
- Mark Pryor D-AR
- Claire McCaskill D-MO
- Jim DeMint R-SC, ranking
- John McCain R-AZ
- Olympia Snowe R-ME
- Gordon H. Smith R-OR
- John Ensign R-NV
- John E. Sununu R-NH

Sponsors

The main sponsor was Byron Dorgan, D-ND

Cosponsors were as follows:

- Patrick Leahy D-VT
- Bob Menendez D-NJ
- Benjamin Cardin D-MD
- Barbara Boxer D-CA
- Joe Biden D-DE
- Lindsey Graham R-SC
- Debbie Stabenow D-MI
- Russell Feingold D-WI
- John Kerry D-MA
- Dick Durbin D-IL
- Carl Levin D-MI
- Chuck Schumer D-NY
- Robert Byrd D-WV
- Sheldon Whitehouse D-RI
- John Reed D-RI
- Jim Webb D-VA
- Tom Harkin D-IA
- Sherrod Brown D-OH
- Hillary Clinton D-NY
- Bob Casey Jr. D-PA
- Evan Bayh D-IN
- Barack Obama D-IL
- Bernie Sanders I-VT
- Jay Rockefeller D-WV
- Frank Lautenberg D-NJ

The source of this information is Govtrack.us.

== Sources ==
=== Govtrack ===
- 109th Congress (2006) (Jun 8, 2006). "S. 3485". Legislation. GovTrack.us. "Decent Working Conditions and Fair Competition Act"
- 109th Congress (2006) (Jun 16, 2006). "H.R. 5635". Legislation. GovTrack.us. "Decent Working Conditions and Fair Competition Act"
- 110th Congress (2007) (Jan 23, 2007). "S. 367". Legislation. GovTrack.us. "Decent Working Conditions and Fair Competition Act"
- 110th Congress (2007) (Apr 18, 2007). "H.R. 1910". Legislation. GovTrack.us. "Decent Working Conditions and Fair Competition Act"
- 110th Congress (2007) (Apr 23, 2007). "H.R. 1992". Legislation. GovTrack.us. "Decent Working Conditions and Fair Competition Act"

=== THOMAS (Library of Congress) ===
- 109th Congress (2006) (Jun 2006). "109 S 3485". THOMAS. Library of Congress.
- 109th Congress (2006) (Jun 2006). "109 HR 5635". THOMAS. Library of Congress. Archived from the original on 2016-01-15.
- 110th Congress (2007) (Oct 2007). "110 S 367". THOMAS. Library of Congress. Archived from the original on 2011-01-07.
- 110th Congress (2007) (Apr 2007). "110 HR 1910". THOMAS. Library of Congress.
- 110th Congress (2007) (May 2007). "110 HR 1992". THOMAS. Library of Congress.

=== Congressional Record ===
- Congressional Record of the 109th Congress. House.; Sherrod Brown (June 27, 2006). "Stop Sweatshop Profiteers". THOMAS. Library of Congress. pp. H4668.
- Congressional Record of the 109th Congress. House.; Sherrod Brown (June 22, 2006). "Support the Decent Working Conditions and Fair Competition Act". THOMAS. Library of Congress. pp. H4497–H4498. Archived from the original on 2008-09-18.
- Congressional Record of the 110th Congress. Senate.; Byron Dorgan (Jan 26, 2007). "Cracking Down on Sweatshop Abuses". THOMAS. Library of Congress. pp. S1235–S1236. Archived from the original on 2008-11-20.
- Congressional Record of the 110th Congress. Senate.; Byron Dorgan (Sep 5, 2007). "Trade and Consumer Safety". THOMAS. Library of Congress. pp. S11088–S11090.
