= Charles Kernaghan =

American activist (1948–2022)

- Born: April 2, 1948; New York City, U.S.
- Died: June 1, 2022 (aged 74); New York City, U.S.
- Occupations: Executive Director, Institute for Global Labour and Human Rights
- Known for: Anti-sweatshop movement

Charles Patrick Kernaghan (April 2, 1948 – June 1, 2022) was the executive director of the Institute for Global Labour and Human Rights, formerly known as the National Labor Committee in Support of Human and Worker Rights, currently headquartered in Pittsburgh. He is known for speaking out against sweatshops, corporate greed and the living and working conditions of impoverished workers around the world. Fashion-industry trade magazine Women's Wear Daily characterised his impact as similar in scale to that of the Triangle Shirtwaist Factory fire. (Note: Barrett, Joyce; Ramey, Joanna (June 6, 1996). "Sweatshop buster Charles Kernaghan: Fashion hits it's nader". Women's Wear Daily. Quoted in The Washington Post:... as did publications such as Women's Wear Daily, which wrote that he was "shaking up the issue of labor abuses in the apparel industry like nothing since the Triangle Shirtwaist Fire.")

== Early life and education ==
Kernaghan was born one of three children in Brooklyn to Roman Catholic immigrant parents. His mother, Mary (Znojemsky), was a Czech-born volunteer social worker, and his father, Andrew Kernaghan, was Scottish, and installed acoustic tiles. In 1970, Kernaghan received a BA in psychology from Loyola University in Chicago and in 1975 a MA in psychology from the New School for Social Research.

== Career ==
In 1996, Kernaghan publicly accused actress and talk show host Kathie Lee Gifford of being responsible for sweatshop conditions in the manufacturing of her Wal-Mart clothing line. Gifford responded on the air by explaining that she was a celebrity endorser and not involved with hands-on project management in manufacturing plants. Kernaghan alleged during congressional testimony that child laborers in Honduras and New York City were making clothing lines under the names of Gifford and other celebrities. Gifford engaged the White House as well and worked with President Bill Clinton to address the situation.

The coverage of the investigations was so widespread that the media began to refer to it as "the summer of the sweatshop." The investigation affected many companies not targeted in the case, and the president of the American Apparel & Footwear Association has said of the controversy:

We remember that every day and that's a lesson to us, the fact that we don't want that to happen again. As a result of that, you had an industry begin to mobilize itself to make certain that, over time, they produce their products in the most responsible manner to make certain that employees are treated with dignity and respect.

Since then he has given testimonies to the U.S. Congress as well as the United Nations. Kernaghan has travelled to Central America, China, Bangladesh, India, Jordan and other developing countries and has spoken with thousands of workers, from hundreds of workplaces. He has targeted the likes of some of the largest multinationals in the world, including Walmart, Nike, Disney, GAP, Alcoa, Victoria's Secret, JCPenney, the NBA, NFL, Reebok, Target Corporation, Kmart, and many others. Some of the work he has done over the years has caused him some trouble.

American Federation of Labor and Congress of Industrial Organizations president John Sweeney said about Kernaghan:

Because of Charlie's crusades ... we're beginning to learn the awful truth about workers around the world who are slaving away their lives in sweatshops, who are denied the right to join or form a union in order to fight back a provide a better life for their families.

Noam Chomsky said of Kernaghan in The Nation that the anti-sweatshop movement is in some ways:

like the antiapartheid movement, except that in this case it's striking at the core of the relations of exploitation. It's another example of how different constituencies are working together. Much of this was initiated by Charlie Kernaghan of the National Labor Committee in New York and other groups within the labor movement.

In May 2006, Kernaghan's organization exposed the plight of thousands of victims of human trafficking in Jordan, working in sweatshops in free trade zones making clothing for export to the United States. The New York Times quoted him as saying, "These are the worst conditions I've ever seen."

Kernaghan has been a frequent guest on Democracy Now!, and his investigations have been published and broadcast by the mainstream media.

== Personal life ==
Kernaghan died in Manhattan, New York City, on June 1, 2022.
