= Kathie Lee Gifford =

American television presenter (born 1953)

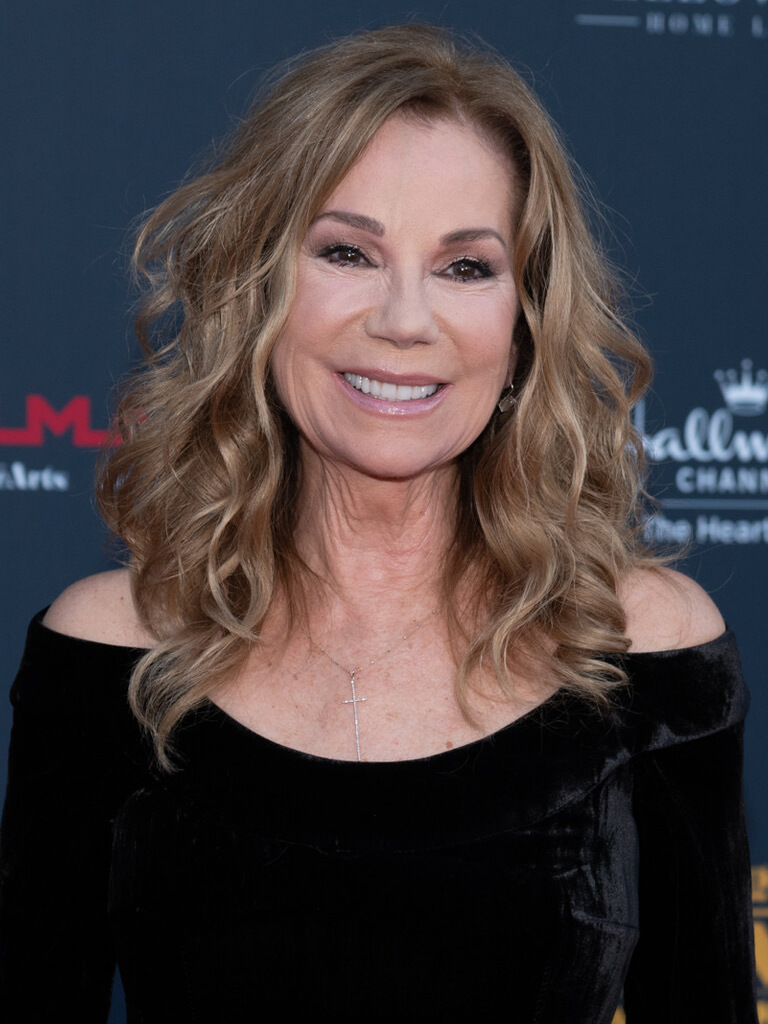
- Gifford in 2020
- Born: Kathryn Lee Epstein; August 16, 1953 (age 73); Paris, France
- Education: Oral Roberts University
- Occupations: Television presenter; talk show host; singer; songwriter; actress; author
- Years active: 1970–present
- Spouses: Paul Johnson (m. 1976; div. 1982); Frank Gifford (m. 1986; died 2015)
- Children: 2, including Cassidy
- Website: www.kathieleegifford.com

Kathryn Lee Gifford (née Epstein; born August 16, 1953) is an American television presenter, singer, songwriter, actress, and author. From 1985 to 2000, she and Regis Philbin hosted the talk show Live! with Regis and Kathie Lee. Gifford is also known for her 11-year run with Hoda Kotb, on the fourth hour of NBC's Today show (2008–2019). She has received 11 Daytime Emmy nominations and won her first Daytime Emmy in 2010 as part of the Today team.

Gifford's first television role was as Tom Kennedy's singer/sidekick on the syndicated version of Name That Tune in the 1977–1978 season. She also occasionally appeared on the first three hours of Today and was a contributing NBC News correspondent.

Gifford married Paul Johnson, a composer, arranger, producer and publisher of Christian music, in 1976, and they divorced in 1982. She is the widow of sportscaster and former NFL player Frank Gifford, whom she married in 1986. Gifford has released studio music albums and several books, with her music and writings featuring spiritual and uplifting themes.

== Early life and beginnings ==
Gifford was born Kathryn Lee Epstein in Paris, France, to American parents, Joan (born Cuttell; January 20, 1930 – September 12, 2017), a singer, and Aaron Epstein (March 19, 1924 – November 19, 2002), a musician and former US Navy Chief Petty Officer. Aaron Epstein was stationed with his family in France at the time of Gifford's birth. Gifford grew up in Bowie, Maryland, and attended Bowie High School.

Gifford's paternal grandfather was a Russian Jew from Saint Petersburg and her paternal grandmother had Native American ancestry. Her mother, a relative of writer Rudyard Kipling, was of French Canadian, German and English descent.

After seeing the Billy Graham-produced film The Restless Ones at age 12, Gifford became a born-again Christian. She told interviewer Larry King, "I was raised with many Jewish traditions and raised to be very grateful for my Jewish heritage."

During high school, Gifford was a singer in a folk group, "Pennsylvania Next Right", which performed frequently at school assemblies. After high school graduation in 1971, Gifford attended Oral Roberts University in Tulsa, Oklahoma, studying drama and music. During a summer in the early 1970s, she was a live-in secretary/babysitter for Anita Bryant at her home in Miami. Her first regular appearances on national TV were as a singer on the game show Name That Tune, hosted by Tom Kennedy in the late 1970s, in which she would sing small portions of songs that contestants would have to identify.

== Career ==
=== Early career ===
Gifford's career took off in 1978 when she joined the cast of the short-lived Hee Haw spinoff, Hee Haw Honeys. She was also a correspondent and substitute anchor on ABC's Good Morning America in the early 1980s.

=== Live! with Regis and Kathie Lee ===
On June 24, 1985, Gifford replaced Ann Abernethy as co-host of The Morning Show on WABC-TV with Regis Philbin. The program went into national broadcast in 1988 as Live! with Regis and Kathie Lee, and Gifford became well known across the country. Throughout the 1990s, morning-TV viewers watched her descriptions of life at home with her sportscaster husband Frank, son Cody, and daughter Cassidy.

In 1990, when TV Guide held a poll for readers to select the most beautiful woman on television, Live! presented a week-long mock campaign to garner votes for Gifford. Gifford wound up winning the poll, receiving more than four times as many votes as the runners-up, Jaclyn Smith and Nicollette Sheridan.

Philbin and Gifford were jointly nominated eight years in a row (1993 to 2000) for Outstanding Talk Show Host during the Daytime Emmy Awards. Gifford decided to leave the show in 2000. She explained that filling in for Carol Burnett on Broadway and guest-hosting Late Show with David Letterman had inspired her to pursue more challenging work. The day after she hosted Late Show on February 24, 2000, she told Regis she had decided to leave Live!. Her last episode aired on July 28, 2000.

=== Today with Kathie Lee and Hoda ===
On March 31, 2008, NBC announced that Gifford was to join its morning show, Today, as co-host of the fourth hour titled Today with Kathie Lee and Hoda, alongside Hoda Kotb. This marked her return to morning television; in many markets, she aired directly after her old show, currently called Live with Kelly and Mark. Because the fourth hour of Today airs live at 10:00 am ET, and Live with Kelly and Ryan airs live at 9:00 am ET, Gifford's hour did not compete directly with her former show in most markets. Kotb and Gifford replaced Ann Curry and Natalie Morales. In the weeks prior to Gifford's arrival, ratings indicated 1.9 million viewers of the fourth hour of Today. As of 2014, the fourth hour of Today with Gifford and Kotb averaged 2.15 million total viewers, an increase of 13 percent over the 2008 ratings. On December 11, 2018, it was announced that she would be leaving Today in April 2019. Her final Today Show appearance was on April 5, 2019, with a party, including a video by her children Cody and Cassidy Gifford. In 2019, Gifford and Kotb won the Daytime Emmy Award for Outstanding Informative Talk Show Host.

=== Other media appearances and projects ===
Gifford has made guest appearances in films and television series, and has several independently released albums on CD, including 2000's The Heart of a Woman, featuring the single "Love Never Fails".

She appeared as a spokesperson for Slim Fast diet shakes after her son Cody was born. She also was the face of Carnival Cruise Lines in the late 1980s and early 1990s, singing "If My Friends Could See Me Now". In 1991, she christened the Carnival Ecstasy, the second of the Fantasy Class of cruise ships. In 1994, she appeared as herself in an episode of the NBC sitcom Seinfeld.

She did a number of voice overs most notably as Echidna in the 1998 TV series Hercules and in Higglytown Heroes as the Mail Carrier Hero in 2004.

In September 2005 she became a special correspondent on The Insider, a syndicated entertainment magazine television show, ending her relationship with that program upon her co-hosting role with Today.

She played the role of Miss Hannigan in a concert performance of Annie at Madison Square Garden in December 2006.

On an episode that aired March 27, 2010, she guest starred on The Suite Life on Deck, along with her real-life daughter, Cassidy.

She appeared as herself in the 2015 television film Sharknado 3: Oh Hell No!.

She has written numerous autobiographical books; Just When I Thought I'd Dropped My Last Egg: Life and Other Calamities in 2010, The Rock, the Road and the Rabbi in March 2018, and It's Never Too Late: Make the Next Act of Your Life the Best Act of Your Life in 2020. Her book regarding the Christian faith, The Jesus I Know: Honest Conversations and Diverse Opinions about Who He Is was released in 2021. She has also written a number of children's books.

=== Ongoing career ===
Gifford left Today in order to pursue a movie career as an actress, director, and producer. In 2018, she filmed Then Came You in which she co-stars with Craig Ferguson. That same year, she also filmed a Hallmark Christmas movie for Hallmark Movies & Mysteries called A Godwink Christmas. Gifford intends to make movies about the experiences of losing a loved one and being a widow, which she considers an underrepresented topic in Hollywood. Gifford has several projects in the works including sequels to Then Came You.

On April 28, 2021, Gifford was honored with a star on the Hollywood Walk of Fame for her contributions to the television industry. Her star is located at 6834 Hollywood Boulevard, only five stars away from that of her former co-host Regis Philbin.

=== Musical theatre ===
In the late 1990s, Gifford began working in musical theatre. She contributed a number of musical numbers to Hats, and wrote and produced Under The Bridge, based upon the children's book The Family Under The Bridge by Natalie Savage Carlson. In 2000 she released the album The Heart of a Woman on Universal.

Gifford wrote the book and lyrics for Saving Aimee, a stage musical about evangelist Aimee McPherson, which premiered in 2007 at the Signature Theatre in Arlington, Virginia. The premiere starred actress Carolee Carmello in the lead role. The show, retitled as Scandalous: The Life and Trials of Aimee Semple McPherson, ran on Broadway from November 15, 2012, through December 9, 2012, with Carmello reprising her role as McPherson. On April 30, 2013, Carmello received her third Tony Award nomination for the performance.

On April 16, 2007, Gifford was a guest presenter at the Washington, D.C. Helen Hayes Award Ceremony, honoring contributions and professional accomplishments in theatre.

In 2008, Gifford and David Friedman wrote a junior high school musical entitled Key Pin It Real. The play depicts a coming-of-age story about a young girl named Key Pin. The first production took place in December 2008 in Kendallville, Indiana, at East Noble High School.

In 2011, Gifford was working on a musical adaptation of It's a Wonderful Life with John McDaniel; McDaniel is composing music while Gifford is writing lyrics.

== Other endeavors ==
=== Charity ===
Gifford is a celebrity ambassador for the non-profit organization Childhelp. She regularly makes appearances at fund raisers and events for the child abuse prevention and treatment organization and is an ardent supporter.

Frank and Kathie Lee Gifford raised the money to build and continued to financially support two shelters in New York City for babies born with HIV, or a congenital crack cocaine addiction. These shelters were named in honor of her children, Cody and Cassidy.

=== Labor rights activity ===
In 1996 Gifford was earning $9 million annually licensing her name to a brand of clothing sold at Walmart. Part of the proceeds went to charity. Charles Kernaghan's human rights group called the National Labor Committee reported that sweatshop labor was being used in manufacturing the Kathie Lee Gifford branded clothing.

Gifford called Kernaghan's report "a vicious attack" on an episode of Live! with Regis and Kathie Lee. Gifford explained during this broadcast that she was not responsible for the contract manufacturers that made her products.

Kernaghan in his congressional testimony of April 1996, said that to make Gifford's clothing, girls as young as 15 worked for 31 cents an hour, 75 hours a week. Kernaghan reported that a worker in Honduras smuggled a piece of clothing out of the factory, which had a Kathie Lee label on it. One of the workers, Wendy Diaz, came to the United States to testify about the conditions under which she worked. She commented, "I wish I could talk to [Kathie Lee]. If she's good, she will help us."

Gifford later contacted federal authorities to investigate the issue and worked with US federal legislative and executive branch agencies to support and enact laws to protect children against sweatshop conditions. She appeared with President Bill Clinton at the White House in support of the government's initiatives to counter international sweatshop abuses.

== Personal life ==
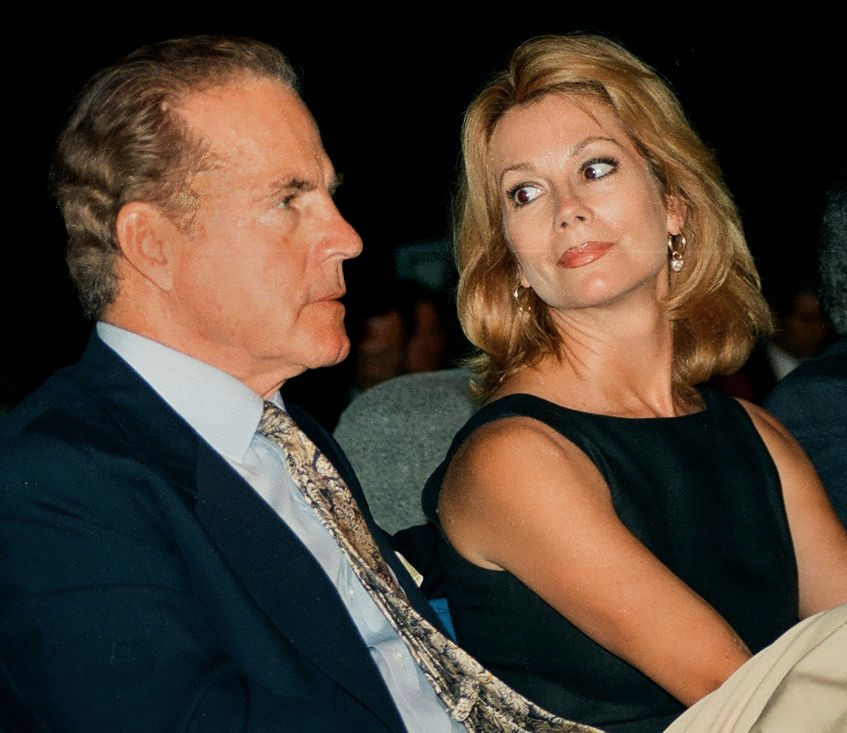
Gifford with her husband Frank in 1996

Kathie Lee married Paul Johnson, a composer/arranger/producer/publisher, in 1976. They gained fame in Christian music, appearing on covers of Christian magazines. The marriage was strained from the start and in 1981, Johnson moved out of their residence in Woodland Hills, California. The couple divorced in 1982.

On October 18, 1986, Kathie Lee married Frank Gifford, an American football player and television sports commentator. They shared the same birthday of August 16.

They had two children together, Cody Newton Gifford (born March 22, 1990), who was named after former Cleveland Browns lineman Cody Risien, and Cassidy Erin Gifford (born August 2, 1993).

In 1997, Frank Gifford was involved in a publicized affair with Suzen Johnson, a former flight attendant. This affair was orchestrated by tabloid magazine the Globe, which hired Johnson to seduce Gifford while being recorded. Johnson was paid between $75,000 and $125,000 to lure Gifford to a hotel room where hidden recording equipment was installed. After two attempts, Johnson tricked Gifford into the room on April 30 and May 1, 1997. The story of the affair was published by the Globe in May of that year.

The couple reconciled and remained married until August 9, 2015, when Frank Gifford died from natural causes at their Greenwich, Connecticut home at the age of 84.

In 2017, Kathie Lee Gifford released the song "He Saw Jesus", co-written with songwriter Brett James, which she dedicated to her late husband. All proceeds from the song went to the international evangelical Christian humanitarian aid charity Samaritan's Purse.

== Discography ==
Credited as Kathie Lee Gifford on all albums except where indicated:

- 1978: Finders Keepers (as Kathie Lee Johnson)
- 1993: It's Christmas Time
- 1993: Christmas Carols
- 1993: Sentimental
- 1993: Christmas with Kathie Lee Gifford (double album)
- 1995: Dreamship: Lullabies for Little Ones
- 1995: Kathie Lee's Rock 'N' Tots Cafe: A Christmas "Giff"
- 2000: Heart of a Woman (as Kathie Lee)
- 2000: Born for You (as Kathie Lee)
- 2001: Goodnight, Angel (as Kathie Lee)
- 2004: Gentle Grace
- 2009: Everyone Has a Story (as Kathie Lee Gifford & Friends)
- 2009: My Way Home
- 2010: Super Hits
- 2013: Scandalous, The Musical
- 2017: The Little Giant
- 2020: Then Came You (Original Motion Picture Soundtrack with Brett James & Sal Oliveri)

== Filmography ==
=== Films ===
| Year | Title | Role(s) | Notes |
|---|---|---|---|
| 1996 | The First Wives Club | Herself | Cameo appearance |
| 1999 | Hercules: Zero to Hero | Echidna (voice) | Voice role |
| 1999 | Dudley Do-Right | Herself | Cameo appearance |
| 2011 | Adventures of Serial Buddies | Herself | |
| 2020 | Then Came You | Annabelle Wilson | Also screenwriter |
| 2022 | Jennifer Lopez: Halftime | Herself | Documentary |

=== Television ===
| Year | Title | Role(s) | Notes |
|---|---|---|---|
| 1975 | Days of Our Lives | Nurse Callihan | Episode dated October 17, 1975 |
| 1978-1979 | Hee Haw Honeys | Kathie Honey | 14 episodes |
| 1985-2000 | The Morning Show / Live! with Regis and Kathie Lee | Herself / Co-host | |
| 1991 | All My Children | Herself | Episode dated November 11, 1991 |
| 1993–2002 | Late Show with David Letterman | Herself / Announcer | |
| 1994 | Evening Shade | Stephanie Rodgers | Episode: "Mama Knows Best" |
| 1994 | Seinfeld | Herself | Episode: "The Opposite" |
| 1995 | Coach | Herself | Episode: "The Day I Met Frank Gifford" |
| 1995 | The Cosby Mysteries | Herself | Episode: "Big Brother Is Watching" |
| 1995 | Women of the House | Herself | Episode: "Dear Diary" |
| 1996, 2000 | Touched by an Angel | Wendy / Jolene | 2 episodes |
| 1996–2002 | The Rosie O'Donnell Show | Herself / Guest host | 12 episodes |
| 1997 | Second Noah | Herself | Episode: "Diving In" |
| 1997 | Happily Ever After: Fairy Tales for Every Child | Jill (voice) | Episode: "Mother Goose" |
| 1997 | Spin City | Herself | Episode: "Radio Daze" |
| 1997 | The Tom Show | Herself | Episode: "It's Jan!" |
| 1997 | Honey, I Shrunk the Kids: The TV Show | Herself | Episode: "Honey, I Know What You're Thinking" |
| 1998 | Diagnosis: Murder | Mary Montgomery | Episode: "Talked to Death" |
| 1998 | The Simpsons | Herself | Episode: "Treehouse of Horror IX" |
| 1998 | Soul Man | Herself | Episode: "Grabbed by an Angel" |
| 1998 | Style & Substance | Herself | Episode: "A Recipe of Disaster" |
| 1998 | Hercules | Echidna (voice) | 4 episodes |
| 1998 | Lateline | Herself | Episode: "Pearce on Conan" |
| 1999 | Hey Arnold! | Jackie Lee (voice) | Episode: "Deconstructing Arnold" |
| 1999 | The Famous Jett Jackson | Herself | Episode: "New York" |
| 2000 | Model Behavior | Deirdre Adams | Television film |
| 2000–2004 | Hollywood Squares | Herself / Panelist | 15 episodes |
| 2001 | The Amanda Show | Princess Whiff | Episode: "Episode 29" |
| 2001 | Spinning Out of Control | Amanda Berkeley | Television film |
| 2001 | Just Shoot Me! | Allison Spencer | Episode: "Sugar Momma" |
| 2001 | The Drew Carey Show | Vanessa Bobeck | Episode: "Christening" |
| 2003 | Star Search | Herself / Guest judge | Episode dated March 5, 2003 |
| 2004 | Hope & Faith | Marge | Episode: "The Diner Show" |
| 2004–2005 | Higglytown Heroes | Mail Carrier (voice) | 2 episodes |
| 2004–2019 | Today | Herself / Co-host | |
| 2005 | That's So Raven | Claire | Episode: "Dog Day After-Groom" |
| 2005–2014 | The View | Herself / Guest host | 7 episodes |
| 2006 | Handy Manny | Mrs. Hillary (voice) | Episode: "Not So Fast Food/Merry-Go-Around" |
| 2009 | The City | Herself | Episode: "Everything On the Line" |
| 2009 | Lipstick Jungle | Herself | Episode: "La Vie en Pose" |
| 2010 | 30 Rock | Herself | Episode: "Floyd" |
| 2010 | The Suite Life on Deck | Cindy | Episode: "Model Behavior" |
| 2011 | Keeping Up with the Kardashians | Herself | Episode: "Kim's Fairytale Wedding: Part 2" |
| 2011 | Hot in Cleveland | Christal | Episode: "Elka's Choice" |
| 2013 | Who Wants to Be a Millionaire | Herself / Contestant | Episode dated May 10, 2013 |
| 2013 | Smash | Herself | Episode: "The Producers" |
| 2014 | The Michael J. Fox Show | Herself | Episode: "Changes" |
| 2014–2017 | Girlfriends' Guide to Divorce | Herself | 3 episodes |
| 2015 | The Mysteries of Laura | Dr. Carlin | Episode: "The Mystery of the Sunken Sailor" |
| 2015 | Donny! | Herself | 2 episodes |
| 2015 | Sharknado 3: Oh Hell No! | Herself | Television film |
| 2015 | Difficult People | Herself | Episode: "Premium Membership" |
| 2016 | Younger | Herself | Episode: "A Kiss Is Just a Kiss" |
| 2017 | Nashville | Herself | Episode: "Hurricane" |
| 2017 | Sharknado 5: Global Swarming | Herself | Television film |
| 2018 | A Godwink Christmas | Aunt Jane | Television film |
| 2019 | The Other Two | Herself | Episode: "Pilot" |
| 2019 | A Godwink Christmas: Meant for Love | Olga | Television film |
| 2019 | The Baxters | Lillian Ashford | 3 episodes |

== Written works ==
Biographical

- 1976: (as Kathie Epstein) The Quiet Riot
- 1992: I Can't Believe I Said That!: An Autobiography by Kathie Lee Gifford
- 1995: Listen to My Heart: Lessons in Love, Laughter, and Lunacy
- 2010: Just When I Thought I'd Dropped My Last Egg: Life and Other Calamities
- 2014: Good Gifts: One Year in the Heart of a Home
- 2018: The Rock, the Road and the Rabbi
- 2020: It’s Never Too Late: Make the Next Act of Your Life the Best Act of Your Life
- 2024: I Want to Matter: Your Life Is Too Short and Too Precious to Waste

Cooking

- 1993: (with Regis Philbin) Cooking With Regis & Kathie Lee: Quick & Easy Recipes From America's Favorite TV Personalities
- 1994: (with Regis Philbin) Entertaining With Regis & Kathie Lee: Year-Round Holiday Recipes, Entertaining Tips, and Party Ideas

Christian faith

- 2004: Gentle Grace: Reflections & Scriptures on God’s Gentle Grace
- 2021: The Jesus I Know: Honest Conversations and Diverse Opinions about Who He Is
- 2022: (with Rabbi Jason Sobel) The God of the Way: A Journey into the Stories, People, and Faith That Changed the World Forever
- 2024: (with Bryan M. Litfin, Ph.D.) Herod and Mary: The True Story of the Tyrant King and the Mother of the Risen Savior
- 2026: (with Bryan M. Litfin, Ph.D.) Nero and Paul: How the Gospel of Grace Defeated the Ruler of Rome

Children's books

- 1997: Christmas with Kathie Lee: A Treasury of Holiday Stories, Songs, Poems, and Activities for Little Ones
- 2010: Party Animals
- 2011: The Three Gifts: A Story About Three Angels and the baby Jesus (co-written with Michael Storrings)
- 2011: The Legend of Messy M'Cheany
- 2018: The Gift That I Can Give
- 2020: Hello, Little Dreamer

== In popular culture ==
A fictionalized version of Kathie Lee Gifford appears in the South Park episode "Weight Gain 4000", voiced by Karri Turner. Gifford later re-appears in the episodes "City on the Edge of Forever", "The Return of Chef", "200" and "201".

== See also ==
- New Yorkers in journalism
- Carnival Ecstasy (Sponsor)

Media offices
| Preceded by Gary Collins and Phyllis George | Miss America Pageant host 1991–1995; Served alongside: Regis Philbin | Succeeded by Eva LaRue and John Callahan |
