= Siobhan Wall =

British author, journalist, artist, lecturer and academic

Siobhan Wall is a British author, journalist, artist, lecturer and academic. She is most noted for her series of guides about tranquil places in busy cities, including Quiet London (2011), Quiet Amsterdam (2012), Quiet Paris (2013), Quiet New York (2014), and Quiet Barcelona (2017) all published by Frances Lincoln. She is an exhibiting artist, exhibition curator and author.

She studied at Cambridge University (BA English Literature) and Central St Martin's College of Art and Design (BA Fine Art and Critical Studies), and completed her PGCE at the Institute of Education, at the University of London. She received her MA in Visual Culture (Distinction) from Middlesex University, London in 1999.

She was the artist in residence with the Clean Clothes Campaign where she curated its 2002 exhibition The Clothes She Wears, a collection of clothes worn by eight women working in the garment industry. The show toured to Paris, Worthing, Ghent, and Utrecht as well as the Royal Geographical Society and The Fashion and Textile Museum in London.

In her own drawing and paintings she tries to show human vulnerability and discomfort. She lives in the Netherlands.
