= Institute for Global Labour and Human Rights =

Non-governmental organization

- Formation: 1980
- Type: NGO
- Purpose: Human and labor rights
- Headquarters: Pittsburgh, Pennsylvania
- Region served: Central America, Bangladesh, Jordan, China, India, Mexico, Japan, United States
- Executive Director: Charles Kernaghan

The Institute for Global Labour and Human Rights, formerly known as the National Labor Committee (until 2011), was a non-profit, non-governmental organization (NGO) that investigates human and labor rights abuses committed by large multinational corporations producing goods in the developing world. The institute was headquartered in Pittsburgh, Pennsylvania, with offices in Bangladesh and Central America. Charles Kernaghan served as the executive director. The Institute published investigations with the goal of influencing public opinion and corporate policy. It is widely considered to be the organization that began the late-20th-century anti-sweatshop movement in America.

The organization suspended operations as of June 2017.

== Founding ==
In 1980, the National Labor Committee (NLC) was founded by Jack Sheinkman, President of the Amalgamated Clothing and Textile Workers Union; Doug Frazer, President of the United Auto Workers; and Bill Wimpisinger, President of the International Association of Machinists. At its founding, the NLC's mission was to help union members and activists in Central America who were victims of political violence. When the 1990 Peace Accords were signed in Central America, the NLC became a registered non-profit and moved its headquarters to New York City, where it expanded its mission to defend human and worker rights globally. Charles Kernaghan joined the NLC in 1986 and became executive director in 1990.

== Media attention ==
In 1996, the NLC met with workers in Guatemala to research alleged sweatshop factory conditions. Workers in the factory presented labels from the Kathie Lee Gifford clothing line, which was produced for Wal-Mart and claimed to be manufactured in the United States. The NLC targeted Kathie Lee and her high-profile, wholesome image, which sparked a media frenzy and brought the issue of sweatshops into the public eye.

Their 1996 discovery and publicity of Gifford's clothing line being manufactured in sweatshops is often cited as the beginning of mainstream media coverage of sweatshop and labor abuses abroad. "Kernaghan will perhaps forever be known as the activist who made Kathie Lee Gifford cry."

Since then, the institute has exposed the conditions under which many celebrity labels are made, including those of Mary-Kate and Ashley Olsen, Sean Combs, Thalia Sodi, and Daisy Fuentes. Other reports released by the NLC have targeted the NBA, the NFL, Disney, Ford Motor Company, Microsoft, K-Mart, Wal-Mart, H&M, Reebok, Puma AG, Nike, Inc., Liz Claiborne, Hanes, Target, Fruit of the Loom, Levi Strauss, JCPenney along with many other clothing labels and companies.

== Campaign tactics ==
The Institute investigated alleged sweatshop conditions in developing countries that export goods to the United States and Europe. With Kernaghan as Director, the Institute publicly pressured brand-name companies by attempting to shame their public image. Kernaghan claims that "if he took the shirt off your back and showed you the blood of children in the fabric, people would snap alert." Kernaghan, along with Associate Director Barbara Briggs, have traveled to conferences and factories posing as corporate investors in order to research labor policies and factory conditions. For an NBC Dateline segment on the work of the National Labor Committee in 2005, Kernaghan wore a pair of eyeglasses with an embedded hidden camera to document conditions inside Bangladeshi plants that produce goods for U.S. companies.

As well as focusing on name-brand companies, the institute also criticized celebrities with clothing lines from factories with labor violations, utilizing their public image to gain media attention. The organization's tactics are criticized by retailers, apparel manufacturers, and international trade representatives for causing negative press rather than transparently negotiating with businesses.

== Legislation ==
The Decent Working Conditions and Fair Competition Act was originally written by the National Labor Committee, in collaboration with the United Steelworkers of America and Senator Byron Dorgan (D-ND). The act would "prohibit the import, export, and sale of goods made with sweatshop labor, and for other purposes." The bill was introduced in 2006 and re-introduced in 2007, but died in committee and did not become law.
