= Sweatshop =

Workplace that has socially unacceptable working conditions

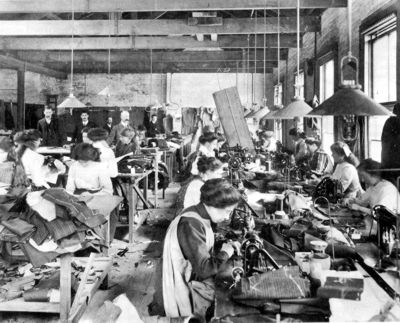
A sweatshop in the United States c. 1890

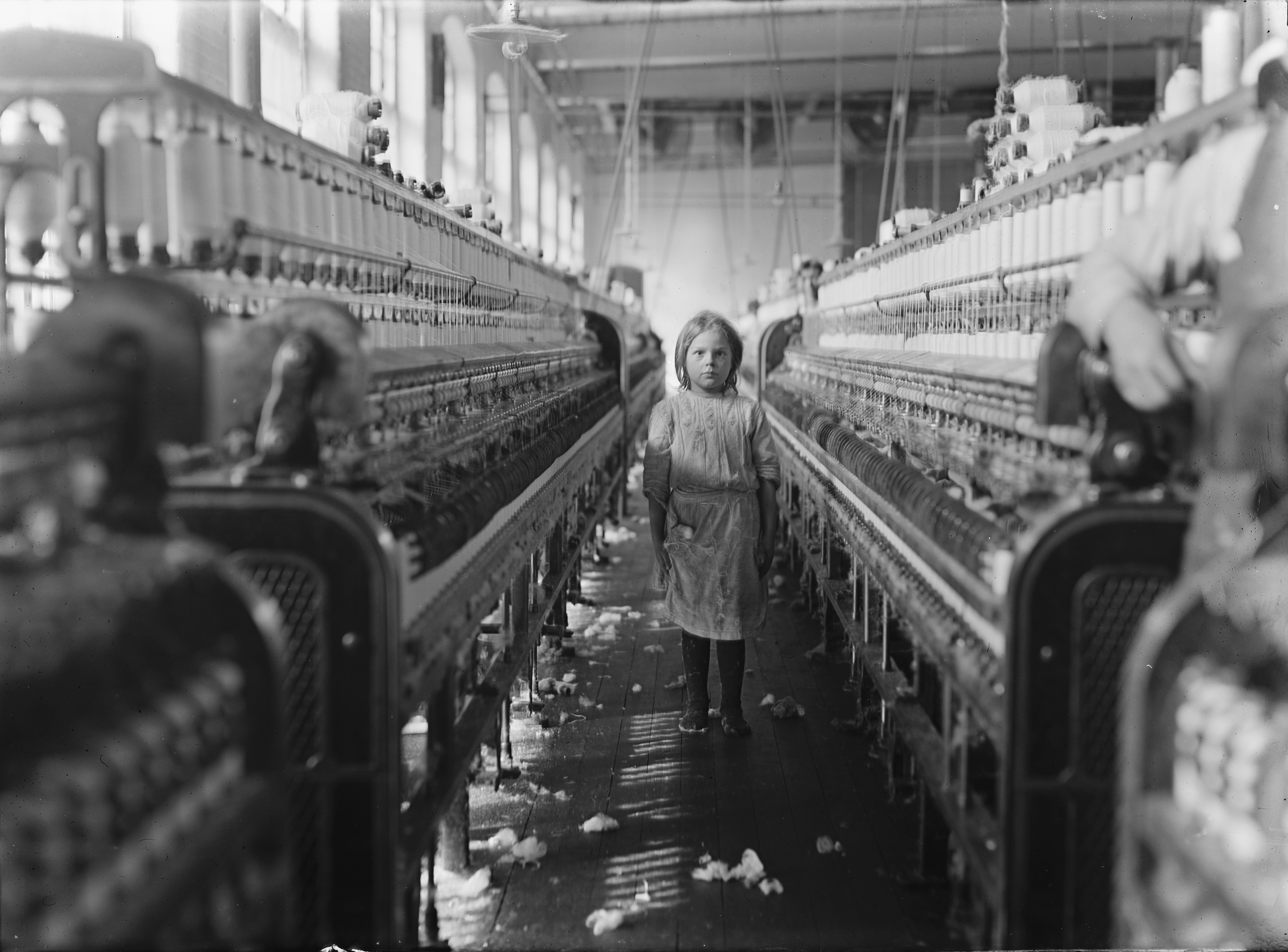
Child laborer 1909, Lewis Wickes Hine

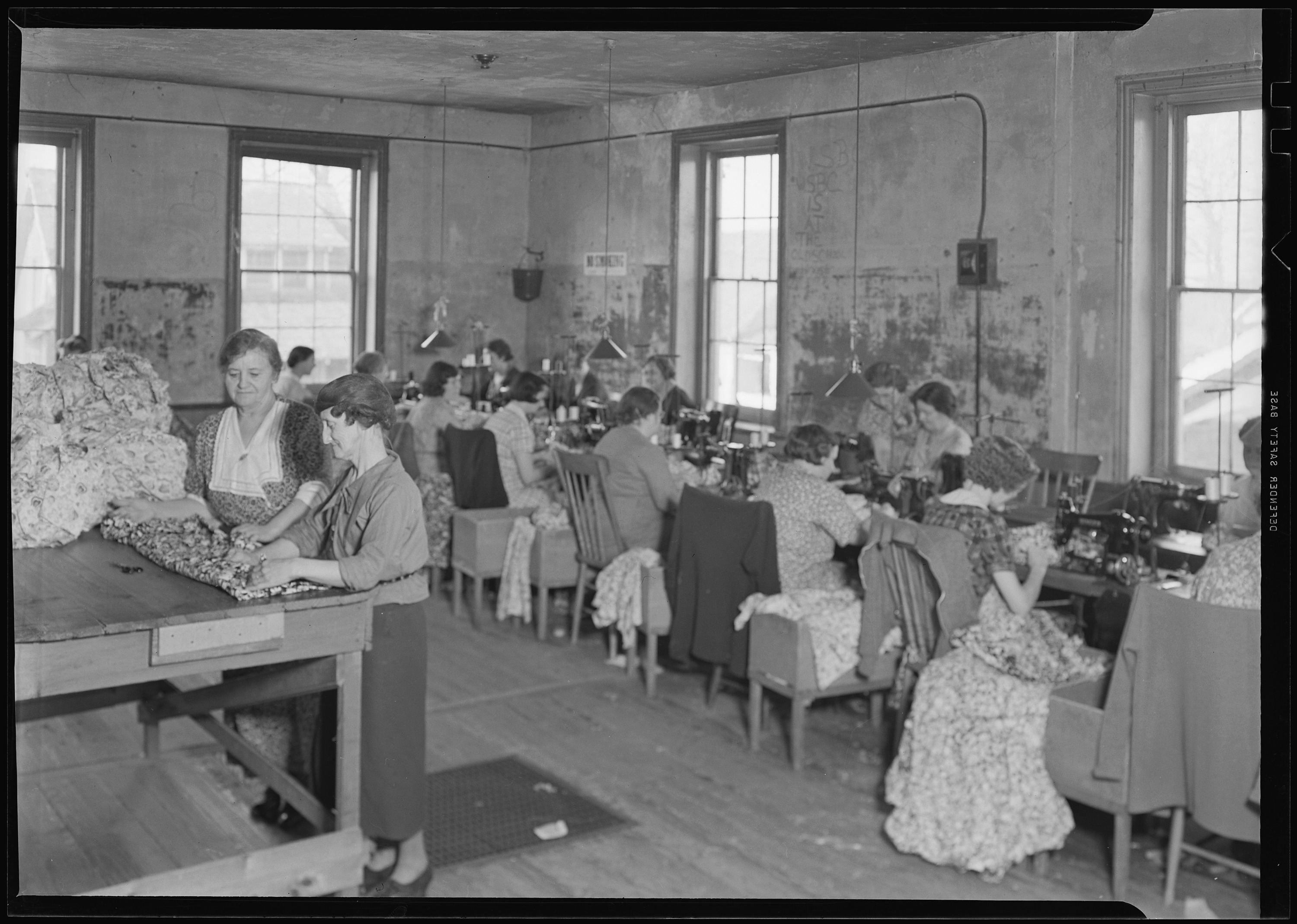
Lewis Hine noted poor working conditions when he photographed workers at the Western Dress Factory in Millville, New Jersey, for the WPA's National Research Project (1937)

A sweatshop or sweat factory is defined as "a shop or factory in which employees work for long hours at low wages and under unhealthy conditions". Examples of unhealthy conditions include little to no breaks, inadequate work space, insufficient lighting and ventilation, or uncomfortably or dangerously high or low temperatures.

The conditions in sweatshops have, in some cases, led to violations of laws on minimum wage, child labor, occupational safety and health, and sexual harassment. Sweatshops have also exacerbated the environmental impact of fashion. However, in some cases, sweatshops have increased the standard of living when compared with alternatives such as subsistence agriculture and sex work. Sweatshops have been credited for being the "first rung" in the economic transition that improved living conditions in the Four Asian Tigers beginning in the 1950s.

Most sweatshops are currently located in India, China, Cambodia, Indonesia, Vietnam, and Bangladesh.

The fashion industry is one of the most labor-dependent industries. Between 80 and 100 billion new pieces of clothing are reportedly manufactured annually. As of 2023, in sweatshops, workers in Bangladesh were paid $0.33/hour on average and $0.58/hour in India.

"Digital sweatshops" are places where workers train large language models and perform content moderation. Scam centers also include sweatshop conditions. Many of these places are involved in human trafficking, whereby workers are tricked into starting work without informed consent or are kept at work through debt bondage.

Penal labor facilities (employing prisoners) may be grouped under the sweatshop label due to underpaid work conditions.

The controversial nature of sweatshops has led to the anti-sweatshop movement.

== History of sweatshops ==
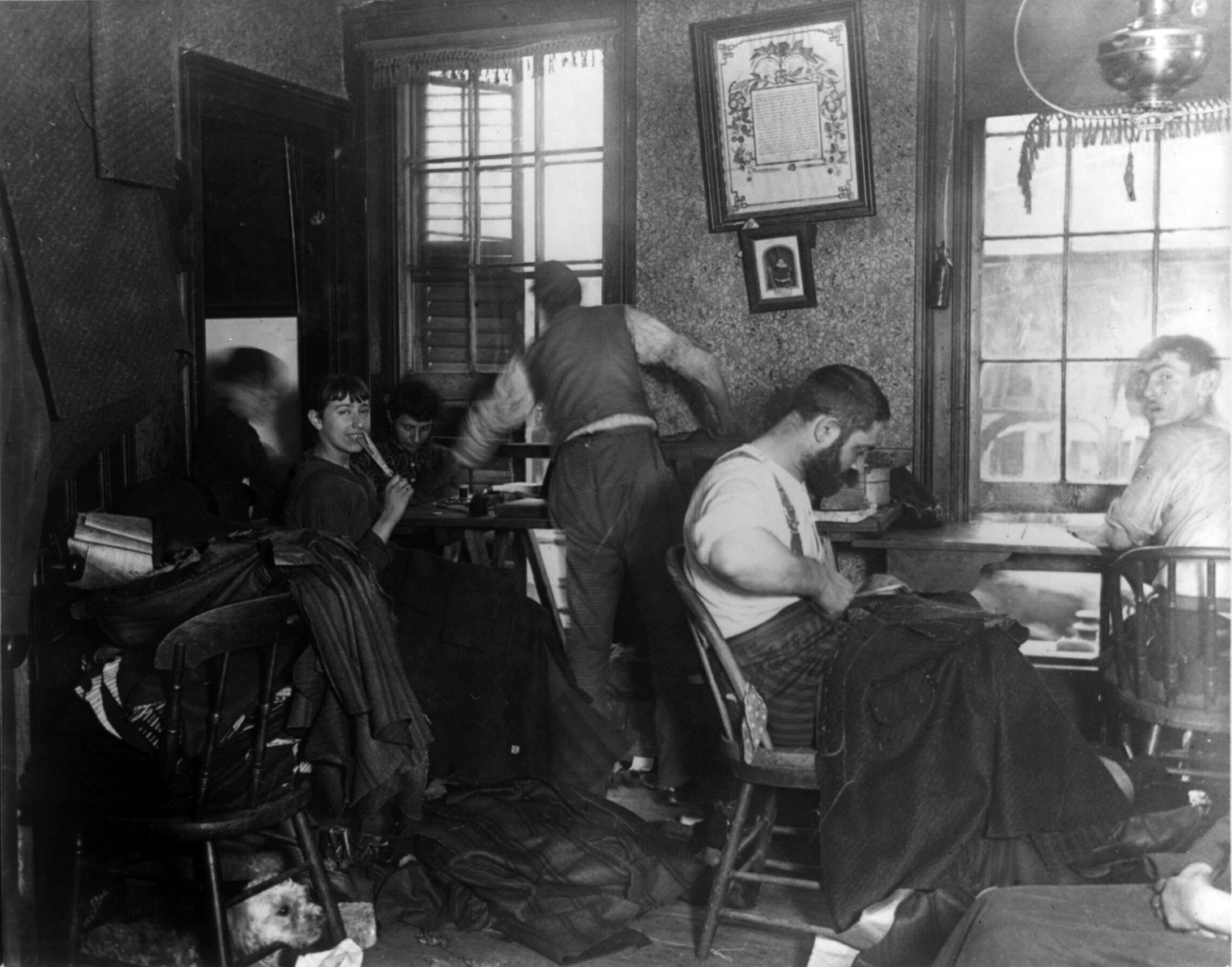
A sweatshop in a New York tenement building, c. 1889

In the late 1700s, as part of the Industrial Revolution, people began working in sweatshops in the United Kingdom. In the early 1800s, the first sweatshops in the United States were built in Rhode Island and Massachusetts. The system was expanded en-masse to the Garment District, Manhattan, which was realizing a huge influx of Italian and Eastern-European Jewish immigrants with limited English language skills, providing a source of cheap labor.

Many workplaces have long been crowded, low-paying, poorly ventilated, prone to fires and rodent infestations, and without job security, but the concept of a sweatshop at that time as a specific type of workshop in which a certain type of middleman, the sweater, directed others in garment making (the process of producing clothing) under arduous conditions. The terms sweater for the middleman and sweat system for the process of subcontracting piecework were first published in early critiques such as Charles Kingsley's Cheap Clothes and Nasty (1850), which described conditions in London, England. The workplaces created for the sweating system (a system of subcontracting in the tailoring trade) were called sweatshops and might contain only a few workers or as many as 300 or more. All those workers were illegally underpaid.

In the United States, sweatshops supporting the cotton textile industry were a contentious topic in American economic and political debate surrounding the use of child labor. In his book Child Labor: An American History (2002), Hugh D. Hindman stated, "In 1870, when New England dominated textiles, 13,767, or 14.5 percent of its workforce was children under sixteen". By the most conservative estimate, from the Census of Manufacturers, there were 27,538 under sixteen in southern mills. According to the household census in 1900, the number was 60,000. To curb this matter, the United States enacted the Fair Labor Standards Act of 1938 (FLSA) to prohibit the employment of minors under the age of sixteen.

In the 1890s, the National Anti-Sweating League was formed in Melbourne, Australia, and campaigned successfully for a minimum wage via trade boards. A group with the same name campaigned from 1906 in the UK, resulting in the Trade Boards Act 1909.

In 1910, the International Ladies' Garment Workers' Union was founded in the United States in attempt to improve the condition of these workers.

In the United States, investigative journalists, known as muckrakers, wrote exposés of business practices, and progressive politicians campaigned for new laws. Notable exposés of sweatshop conditions include Jacob Riis' photo documentary How the Other Half Lives (1890) and Upton Sinclair's book, The Jungle (1906), a fictionalized account of the meat packing industry.

In 1911, the Triangle Shirtwaist Factory fire galvanized negative public perceptions of sweatshops in New York City. The outrage that followed led to the implementation of minimum wage laws, fire safety codes, and labour laws.

Immigration quotas enacted in the United States in the 1920s led to a change in the makeup of sweatshop workers, evident by the 1950s. The cheap labor from Eastern and Southern Europe was replaced with Puerto Ricans and African Americans. The Civil Rights Act of 1964 then led many of these workers to seek higher paying jobs. The Immigration and Nationality Act of 1965, the Bracero Program, the 1972 visit by Richard Nixon to China, and the Fall of Saigon led to an increase in Hispanic and Asian immigration to the United States; these workers then filled sweatshop roles.

At the same time, many consumers sought out lower prices by shopping at national chains and mega-retailers instead of smaller local shops. This put pressure on manufacturers to find ways to lower costs. Starting in the late 1960s and accelerating rapidly through the 1980s and 1990s, increased globalization and free trade agreements led to a "race to the bottom" whereby companies moved manufacturing to the locations with the lowest costs, generally the developing world. In 1981, a minimum-wage worker in Haiti made $2.64 a day while an American minimum-wage worker earned $26.80 a day, making a move to a lower-cost country an attractive proposition for manufacturers.

The number of garment workers in the United States dropped from 1.2 million in 1970 to 760,000 in 1995, a 37% decrease. Over 850,000 jobs were lost in developed countries but that number was matched by growth in developing countries. Four-fifths of the employment growth occurred in Asian countries- Bangladesh, Thailand, Indonesia- while the highest number of clothing job losses were in the United States.

In 1996, President Bill Clinton formed the White House Apparel Industry Partnership to resolve sweatshop abuses in the United States. Between 1993 and 1997, the United States Department of Labor, then led by Robert Reich, recovered $12.5 million in back wages owed to more than 40,000 workers.

Fast fashion grew during the late 20th century as the clothing industry adopted cheaper manufacturing techniques including more efficient supply chains, new quick response manufacturing methods, increased usage of low-cost labor from Asia, and cheaper petroleum-based synthetic fibers. Fast fashion particularly came to the fore during the vogue for "Boho-chic" in the mid-2000s. This led to an increase in sweatshop use.

According to labor organizations in Hong Kong, as of 2004, up to $365 million was withheld by managers who restrict pay in exchange for some service, or don't pay at all.

Starting in the 2010s, demand for clothing increased due to viral trends on social media services such as Instagram and TikTok.

According to the International Labour Organization, in 2012, 168 million children were employed in sweatshops, although this was a decrease from 246 million in 2000.

In 2013, in Dhaka District, Bangladesh, the Rana Plaza collapse killed over 1,100 workers due to a structurally unsound building and led to worldwide calls for new labor laws and increased government regulation in countries that produce garments in sweatshops. It also inspired the production of "The True Cost" (2015), a documentary on the garment industry, specifically fast fashion.

The United States Department of Labor's "2015 Findings on the Worst Forms of Child Labor" found that "18 countries did not meet the International Labour Organization's recommendation for an adequate number of inspectors."

In 2016, the United States Department of Labor investigated 77 garment factories in Los Angeles that produced clothing for the aforementioned brands, and found labor violations at 85% of the factories it visited.

Scam centers, also called "scam sweatshops" and usually involve human trafficking, grew in the 2020s.

=== Digital sweatshops ===
In the 2020s, "digital sweatshops" were established, whereby workers train large language models to use artificial intelligence or handle Content moderation tasks; these usually require watching videos of murders, rapes, suicides, and child sexual abuse. More than 2 million people in the Philippines perform this type of work. Workers are paid at extremely low rates, as little as $1.50/hour, routinely delayed or withheld payments, and provided with few channels to seek recourse.

== Impacts of sweatshops ==
=== Female predominance in the workforce ===
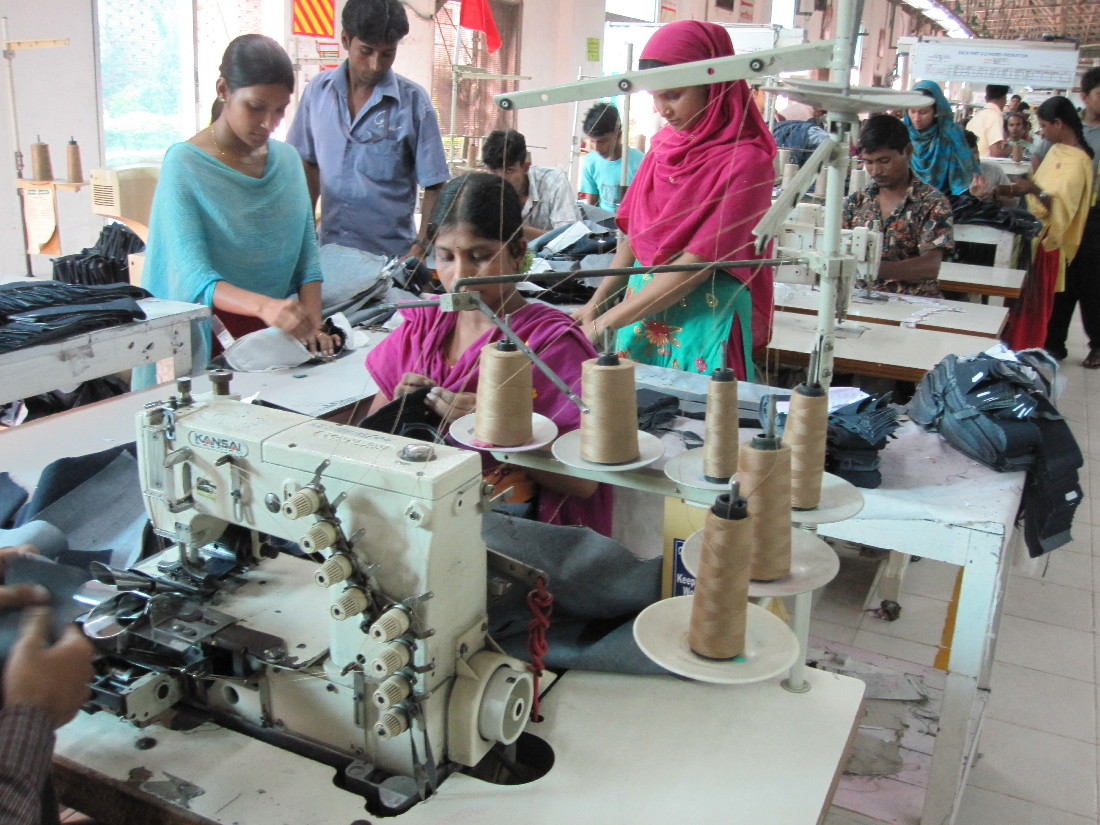
July 2011, women and men working in a garment factory in Bangladesh

There are more than 60 million workers that produce clothing for fast fashion retail. In areas such as Sri Lanka, Bangladesh, and the Philippines, 70%-90% of those workers are women. Most of these workers are in "export processing zones" (free-trade zones with incentives to attract foreign investors).

Employers generally prefer to hire men in technical and managerial positions and women in lower-skilled production work. Moreover, employers tend to prefer hiring women for production jobs because they are seen as more compliant and less likely to join labour unions. In addition, a report that interviewed Sri Lankan women working in export processing zones found that gender-based violence "emerged as a dominant theme in their narratives". For example, 38% of women reported seeing or experiencing sexual harassment within their workplace. However, proponents of textile and garment production as a means for economic upgrading in developing countries (global value chain) have pointed out that clothing production work tends to have higher wages than other available jobs, such as agriculture or domestic service work, and therefore provides women with a larger degree of financial autonomy.

Hiring frequently targets young migrant and rural women, highlighting an intersection of gender, age and migration status, where workers are then managed through surveillance, quotas and limits on collective organizing. Consequently, such a system makes women's labour central to export growth despite diminishing social protections. More documented practices experienced by workers include pregnancy testing at hiring, dismissal upon pregnancy, and curfews within employer-run dormitories, limiting autonomy and voice. From such workplace conditions to transnational supply chains, these micropolitical and macropolitical structures help explain how decision-making is made with brands and buyers outside producing communities, while social and environmental costs stay local, especially within South and Southeast Asian production zones.

=== Impact on standard of living and employment rates in developing countries ===
Nicholas Kristof argues that conditions in sweatshops, while not ideal, are improvements over alternatives and prior conditions which usually entailed subsistence agriculture and starvation by unemployment and therefore sweatshops have increased standard of living in developing countries.

Kristof argues that the anti-sweatshop movement "risks harming the very people it is aiming to help" because sweatshops signify the start of an industrial revolution and offer people a path towards making money and escaping poverty. The anti-sweatshop movement, in this view, can harm the impoverished workers by increasing labour costs for factories which, in turn, can incentivize turning to technology instead of people for labour and thus reduce the number of employees needed. Additionally, if anti-sweatshop movements succeed and manage to get stricter guidelines passed, companies may move to countries with less strict laws governing sweatshops, thus removing a source of jobs and money for impoverished countries.

Despite the hardships of sweatshops, they are a source of income for their workers. Elimination of sweatshops has led to malnourishment or starvation. After the Child Labor Deterrence Act was introduced in the US, an estimated 50,000 children were dismissed from their garment industry jobs in Bangladesh, leaving many to resort to jobs such as "stone-crushing, street hustling, and prostitution". UNICEF's 1997 State of the World's Children study found these alternative jobs "more hazardous and exploitative than garment production".

According to Paul Krugman, "as manufacturing grows in poor countries, it creates a ripple effect that benefits ordinary people: 'The pressure on the land becomes less intense, so rural wages rise; the pool of unemployed urban dwellers always anxious for work shrinks, so factories start to compete with each other for workers, and urban wages also begin to rise.' In time average wages creep up to a level comparable to minimum-wage jobs in the United States."

Even if a company does not move to another country with more relaxed labor laws, economic demand theory says that the more a good cost, the less the demand for it is. Economists argue that even though the labor is "exploitative", it should be permitted, as trying to put regulations on sweatshop labor would only result in sweatshops needing fewer workers, thus reducing opportunities for individuals to make a living. Sweatshops increase employment and investment.

A 2005 article in the Christian Science Monitor noted that sweatshop wages are above average in many cases: "For example, in Honduras, the site of the infamous Kathy Lee Gifford sweatshop scandal, the average apparel worker earns $13.10 per day, yet 44 percent of the country's population lives on less than $2 per day... In Cambodia, Haiti, Nicaragua, and Honduras, the average wage paid by a firm accused of being a sweatshop is more than double the average income in that country's economy."

Although many anti-sweatshop campaigners would like for globalization to be reversed and factories to close, citizens of these developed countries do not have many options for alternative work. In developing countries, the primary alternative work consists of lower-wage agriculture.

Other criticisms include advocating for humane globalization. This advocacy includes making a distinction between cost of living and the parallel to wage. For example, it does not cost a citizen the same to live in Bangladesh as in Europe.

=== Comparative advantage ===
Jeffrey Sachs and other proponents of free trade and the global movement of capital cite the economic theory of comparative advantage, which states that international trade will, in the long run, make all parties better off; developing countries improve their condition by doing something they can do better or cheaper, given their skillsets.

Johan Norberg, a proponent of market economics, has said that developing countries "won't get rich without being able to export goods".

=== Impact of sweatshops in the Four Asian Tigers ===
The Four Asian Tigers (Hong Kong, Singapore, South Korea, and Taiwan) have been used as examples of countries that benefited from having sweatshops.

In these countries, legislative and regulatory frameworks to protect and promote labor rights and the rights of workers against unsafe and exploitative working conditions exist, and studies have shown no systematic relationship between labor rights, such as collective bargaining and the freedom of association, and national economic growth.

== Anti-sweatshop movement ==
The anti-sweatshop movement refers to campaigns to improve the conditions of workers in sweatshops. It started in the 19th century in industrialized countries such as the United States, Australia, New Zealand and the United Kingdom to improve the conditions of workers in those countries. These campaigns are meant to improve the working conditions through advocacy for higher wages, safer conditions, unionization and other protections.

Consumers can use their buying decisions to further the anti-sweatshop movement.

Notable supporters of the movement include Noam Chomsky.

=== History ===
Some of the earliest sweatshop critics were found in the 19th-century abolitionist movement that had originally coalesced in opposition to chattel slavery, and many abolitionists saw similarities between slavery and sweatshop work. As slavery was successively outlawed in industrial countries between 1794 (in France) and 1865 (in the United States), some abolitionists sought to broaden the anti-slavery consensus to include other forms of harsh labor, including sweatshops. As it happened, the first significant law to address sweatshops (the Factory Act 1833) was passed in the United Kingdom at the same time that the slave trade (1807) and ownership of slaves (1833) were made illegal.

Ultimately, the abolitionist movement split apart. Some advocates focused on working conditions and found common causes with trade unions Marxists and socialist political groups, or progressive movement and the muckrakers. Others focused on the continued slave trade and involuntary servitude in the colonial world. For those groups that remained focused on slavery, sweatshops became one of the primary objects of controversy. Workplaces across multiple sectors of the economy were categorized as sweatshops. However, there were fundamental philosophical disagreements about what constituted slavery. Unable to agree on the status of sweatshops, the abolitionists working with the League of Nations and the United Nations ultimately backed away from efforts to define slavery and focused instead on a common precursor of slavery including human trafficking.

Those focused on working conditions included Friedrich Engels, whose book The Condition of the Working Class in England in 1844 (1845) inspired the Marxist movement named for his collaborator, Karl Marx.

In the United Kingdom, the first effective Factory Act was introduced in 1833 to help improve the condition of workers by limiting work hours and the use of child labor; but this applied only to textile factories. Later Acts extended protection to factories in other industries, but not until 1867 was there any similar protection for employees in small workshops, and not until 1891 was it possible to effectively enforce the legislation where the workplace was a dwelling (as was often the case for sweatshops).

The formation of the International Labour Organization in 1919 under the League of Nations and then the United Nations sought to address the plight of workers the world over.

Concern over working conditions as described by muckraker journalists during the Progressive Era in the United States led to the passage of workers' rights laws and ultimately resulted in the Fair Labor Standards Act of 1938, passed during the New Deal.

Beginning in 1997, several jurisdictions passed laws requiring government suppliers to be sweatshop-free.

The anti-sweatshop movement successfully utilized investigative journalism to mobilize the middle class on a range of worker rights. Prominent reformers include Samuel Plimsoll, Lord Shaftesbury Anthony Ashley-Cooper, Henry Mayhew, Upton Sinclair, and Robert M. La Follette.

In 2004, the resolution of the lawsuit against Forever 21 and the settlement of the lawsuit against Bebe Stores was a triumphant turning point for the anti-sweatshop movement because local laws could be used to hold a retailer to account.

In 2004, a survey showed that people would be willing to pay more for a product if it did not come from a sweatshop.

By 2009, clothing and footwear factories overseas have progressively improved working conditions because of the high demand of anti-sweatshop movement labor rights advocates.

In the 2010s, social media was used to advance the anti-sweatshop movement.

In May 2017, Mama Cash and The Clean Clothes Campaign, both organizations that are working towards abolishing sweatshops as well as creating a world of sustainable and ethical apparel practices, worked together to create The Women Power Fashion Pop-up. The event took place in Amsterdam and allowed consumers to sit in a room designed to look and feel like a sweatshop and were forced to create 100 ties in an hour which is synonymous to that of the expectations of women working in sweatshops today. This pop-up allowed consumers to actually experience the life of a sweatshop worker for a limited time and thus made them more sympathetic to the cause. Outside of the pop-up was a petition that consumers could sign to convince brands to be more transparent with their clothing manufacturing processes. The campaign went viral and created a significant buzz for the anti-sweatshop movement as well as the work of Mama Cash and The Clean Clothes Campaign.

In China, the minimum wage was raised by approximately 7% in 10 provinces in 2019 with the goal of improving living conditions.

=== Effectiveness of campaigns on sales and stock prices ===
A study published in 2011 found that while in most cases anti-sweatshop movements did not affect sales for companies using sweatshops, they did correspond with a decrease in the sales of well-known, more specialized brands and more intense movements caused more significant reduction in the sales. The same study also found that anti-sweatshop events also seemed to correspond with lower stock prices for the companies that were the target of these events, though some major anti-sweatshop events such the Kaksy lawsuit against Nike, did not result in any discernible change in stock price of the targeted company. The study found that 64.1% of the companies targeted by anti-sweatshop movements saw drops in stock price in the five days following the anti-sweatshop event, and 56.4% saw drops in the two days following the event. Though the study did find these slight negative economic effects, it did not find that, when taking into account companies of all reputations, anti-sweatshop movements or events damaged the reputation of the companies they targeted to a statistically significant degree; however, there does seem to be a slight undercutting of the reputations of companies with positive reputations when they are faced with anti-sweatshop campaigns, particularly intense ones.

=== Ability to replace jobs if sweatshops are shut ===
A major issue for the anti-sweatshop movement is the fate of workers displaced if sweatshops are closed. This was an issue when, after the Rana Plaza collapse led to the shutdown of many sweatshops in Bangladesh, the affected employees were not able to get replacement jobs. In many cases, workers turned to sex work after they lost their jobs.

In late 2001, 100,000 sweatshop workers in Bangladesh were laid off. The workers petitioned their government to lobby the U.S. government to repeal its trade barriers so that they can go back to their sweatshop jobs.

=== Activities ===
The National Labor Committee brought sweatshops into the mainstream media in the 1990s when it exposed the use of sweatshop and child labor to sew clothing for Kathie Lee Gifford's Walmart label.

United Students Against Sweatshops is active on college campuses.

The International Labor Rights Fund filed a lawsuit on behalf of workers in China, Nicaragua, Swaziland, Indonesia, and Bangladesh against Wal-Mart charging the company with knowingly developing purchasing policies particularly relating to price and delivery time that are impossible to meet while following the Wal-Mart code of conduct.

Labor unions, such as the AFL–CIO, have helped support the anti-sweatshop movement out of concern both for the welfare of workers in the developing world and those in the United States.

=== Arguments ===
Proponents of the anti-sweatshop movement cite examples where sweatshops have reduced living standards and wages.

They believe that better-paying jobs, increased capital investment and domestic ownership of resources will improve economies, rather than sweatshops.

Sometimes local jobs offered higher wages before trade liberalization provided tax incentives to allow sweatshops to replace former local unionized jobs.

Opponents also argue that sweatshop jobs are not necessarily inevitable.

Éric Toussaint claims that quality of life in developing countries was actually higher between 1945 and 1980 before the Latin American debt crisis harmed economies in developing countries causing them to turn to IMF and World Bank-organized "structural adjustments" and that unionized jobs pay more than sweatshop jobs.

People critical of sweatshops believe that "free trade agreements" do not truly promote free trade at all but instead seek to protect multinational corporations from competition by local industries (which are sometimes unionized). They believe free trade should only involve reducing tariffs and barriers to entry and that multinational businesses should operate within the laws in the countries they want to do business in rather than seeking immunity from obeying local environmental and labor laws. They believe these conditions are what give rise to sweatshops rather than natural industrialization or economic progression.

=== Hinderances to the anti-sweatshop movement ===
==== Apathy due to distance ====
While the Triangle Shirtwaist Factory fire in 1911 galvanized the population to political activism that eventually pushed through reforms not only pertaining to workplace safety, but also the minimum wage, the eight-hour day, workers' compensation, Social Security the Clean Air Act, and the Clean Water Act, the same did not happen after the Rana Plaza collapse, according to Erik Loomis, mainly because most consumers are too far from Bangladesh to be outraged. He elaborates:

So in 2013, when over 1100 workers die at Rana Plaza in Bangladesh, it is the same industry as the Triangle Fire, with the same subcontracted system of production that allows apparel companies to avoid responsibility for work as the Triangle Fire, and with the same workforce of young and poor women, the same type of cruel bosses, and the same terrible workplace safety standards as the Triangle Fire. The difference is that most of us can't even find Bangladesh on a map, not to mention know enough about it to express the type of outrage our ancestors did after Triangle. This separation of production from consumption is an intentional move by corporations precisely to avoid being held responsible by consumers for their actions. And it is very effective.

==== Corruption and poor worker education ====
Many sweatshop laborers have lost autonomy and corporations have gained in their invincibility to anti-sweatshop laws within a particular country. Corporations have the ability to move their production to another country when the laws become too restricting. Many sweatshop movements have begun to see "worker internationalization" as one of the only viable solutions; however, this requires strong labor movements, sufficient resources, and a commitment to mobilizing all workers, including women, which can be difficult to do at an international scale, as has been the case in the Americas.

Government corruption, inadequate labour protection legislation, and weak law enforcement has led to the establishment of sweatshops in certain countries.

These circumstances allow factories to provide dangerous working conditions for workers. According to the Corruption Perception Index 2016 (2017), countries with a high risk of corruption such as Bangladesh, Vietnam, India, Pakistan and China are reported to have larger numbers of unsafe garment factories operating inside the countries.

In Dubai, some labour camps do not have proper conditions for workers. If workers protest, they can be deported if they are foreigners.

Many workers in developing countries are ignorant about their rights because of their low education levels. Most of sweatshops are located in countries that have low education levels. Most of them do not know about their rights, such as matters about wages and supposed working conditions, thus they have no skill set to fight for their labour rights through collective bargaining (such as strikes or work to rule). Their lack of knowledge makes it hard for them to improve working conditions on their own.

=== Corporate use of sweatshops and responses to the anti-sweatshop movement ===
Brands that used sweatshops as of 2023 included Shein, Nike, H&M, Zara, Disney Consumer Products, and Victoria's Secret. Brands that used sweatshops as of 2011 included GAP, Abercrombie & Fitch, Banana Republic, and others.

In 2014, Apple was caught "failing to protect its workers" in one of its Pegatron factories. Overwhelmed workers were caught falling asleep during their 12-hour shifts and an undercover reporter had to work 18 days in a row. Sweatshops in question carry characteristics such as compulsory pregnancy tests for female laborers and terrorization from supervisors into submission. Workers then go into a state of forced labor, and if even one day of work is not accounted for they could be immediately fired. These working conditions have been the source of suicidal unrest within factories in the past. Chinese sweatshops known to have increased numbers of suicidal employees have suicide nets covering the whole site, in place to stop overworked and stressed employees from leaping to their deaths, such as in the case of the Foxconn suicides.

In 2015, anti-sweatshop protesters protested against Uniqlo in Hong Kong. Along with the Japanese anti-sweatshops organisation Human Rights Now, the Hong Kong labour organisation Students and Scholars Against Corporate Misbehaviour (SACOM) protested the "harsh and dangerous" working conditions in Uniqlo's value-added factories in China. According to a report published by SACOM in 2015, Uniqlo’s suppliers were blamed for "systematically underpaying their labour, forcing them to work excessive hours and subjecting them to unsafe working conditions, which included sewage-covered floors, poor ventilation, and sweltering temperatures".

H&M has faced controversial issues and backlash regarding sweatshops in Asian countries. H&M is the largest producer of clothing, with sweatshop factories in under-developed South Asian and Southeast Asian countries like India, Bangladesh and Cambodia. 500 employees in Indonesia left their work and protested for higher pay as their pay was below the country's minimum wage. Once a strike evolved, the factory removed their access to the building and paid men to harass the workers.

According to the 2016 Clean Clothes Campaign, H&M strategic suppliers in Bangladesh were reported for dangerous working environments, which lacked vital equipment for workers and adequate fire exits.

In 2020, auditors uncovered a large chain of factories in Leicester producing clothes for Boohoo.com that were only paying their workers between £3-4. The conditions of the factories were described as terrible and workers received "illegally low pay".

Adidas was criticized for its Indonesian sweatshops in 2000, and accused of underpayment, overtime working, physical abuse and child labour.

In 2023, Nike, Inc. received backlash over its use of sweatshops. Over 4,000 Nike garment employees were allegedly not paid $2.2 million in owed wages for over three years. This accrual of unpaid wages spanned from the Violet Apparel factory in Cambodia to the Hong Seng Knitting Factory in Thailand, and many human rights organizations called Nike out on their violations against laborers.

Nike was the target of anti-sweatshop protests organised by the United Students Against Sweatshops (USAS) in Boston, Washington D.C., Bangalore, and San Pedro Sula. Protestors claimed that workers in Nike's contract factory in Vietnam were suffering from wage theft, verbal abuse and harsh working conditions with "temperatures over the legal limit of 90 degrees". Since the 1990s, Nike has been reported to employ sweat factories and child labour. Nike established an independent department which aimed to improve workers’ livelihoods in 1996. It was renamed the Fair Labor Association in 1999, as a non-profit organisation which includes representatives from companies, human rights organizations, and labour unions to work on the monitoring and management of labour rights.

=== Corporate codes of conduct ===
A study of corporate codes of conduct in the apparel industry by the U.S. Department of Labor in 1996 concluded that corporate codes of conduct that monitor labor norms in the apparel industry, rather than boycott or eliminate contracts upon the discovery of violations of internationally recognized labor norms, are a more effective way to eliminate child labor and the exploitation of children, provided they provide for effective monitoring that includes the participation of workers and their knowledge of the standards to which their employers are subject.

Nike has published annual sustainable business reports since 2001 and annual corporate social responsibility reports continuously since 2005, mentioning its commitments, standards and audits.

=== Sweatshop-free ===
Although the definition varies, "sweatshop-free" or "sweat free" generally refers to coercion-free, fair-compensation and treatment for garment workers who manufacture products in good working conditions without the use of sweatshops. Sweatshop-free standards include the right to collective bargaining, non-poverty wages, safe workplaces, and no harassment.

Brands that claim to be sweatshop-free include American Apparel, Patagonia, Inc., and Everlane.

Jurisdictions that require their suppliers to be sweatshop-free include North Olmsted, Ohio (since 1997), Los Angeles (since 2005), San Francisco (since 2005), and Portland, Oregon (since 2008).

==== #WhoMadeMyClothes ====
The #WhoMadeMyClothes hashtag was launched in 2013 by Fashion Revolution co-founders, Carry Somers and Orsola de Castro. Celebrities including Emma Watson, Kelly Slater, and Fernanda Paes Leme used the hashtag on Twitter to support the issue.

To promote the hashtag in 2015, Fashion Revolution posted a video to YouTube titled "The 2 Euro T-Shirt - A Social Experiment". The video showed a vending machine selling T-shirts for €2. When people went to purchase the shirt, a video played describing the working conditions in which the shirt was made. By the end, people chose to donate to the cause of increasing supply chain transparency instead of buying the T-shirt.

== See also ==
- Child labour – Exploitation of children through work
- Craftivism – Form of activism centered on practices of craft
- Nicholas D. Kristof – American journalist and political commentator (born 1959)
- National Anti-Sweating League – Historical groups of labor organisations in Australia and the UK
- National Labor Committee in Support of Human and Worker Rights – Non-governmental organization
- 2011 Chengdu Foxconn explosion – Industrial accident in Chengdu, China
- Anti-sweatshop movement – Campaigns to improve the conditions of workers in sweatshops
- Assembly line – Manufacturing process
- Black company (Japan) – Business with an exploitative work culture
- Comparative advantage – Lower relative opportunity cost in producing a good
- Contingent work – Non-permanent type of employment
- Child labour – Exploitation of children through work
- Criticism of Amazon – Varied criticism across business areas
- Digital Product Passport
- Economic development – Process and policies to improve economic well-being
- Emerging market – Country's economy that was traditionally small, but is currently expanding rapidly
- Exploitation of labour – Economic phenomenon
- Fair Labor Association
- Fast fashion in China
- Forced labour – Work that employs people against their will
- Free-trade zone – Geographic area where economic activity between and within countries is less regulated
- Inspection – Organized examination or formal evaluation exercise
- Gold farming – Practice of professional video game players
- Kafala system – System used to monitor migrant laborers in Arab countries
- Lower East Side Tenement National Historic Site – Museum in Manhattan, New York
- Maquiladora – Tariff-free factory in Latin America
- Michael H. Belzer – American academic and former truck driver
- National Anti-Sweating League – Historical groups of labor organisations in Australia and the UK
- Nike sweatshops – Accusations that Nike operates sweatshops
- Perspiration – Fluid secreted from sudoriferous glands
- Precariat – Class of wage-earners in a tenuous job situation close to unemployment
- Precarious work – Type of non-standard or temporary employment
- Protectionism – Economic policy of restricting imports
- Race to the bottom – Economic competition scenario
- Rana Plaza collapse – 2013 industrial building collapse in Savar, Bangladesh
- Sheltered workshop – Type of employment for disabled people
- Ship breaking – Disposal process for scrap
- Slavery – Ownership of people as property
- Slavery in the 21st century
- The True Cost
- Union organizer – Specific type of trade union member (often elected) or an appointed union official
- Wage slavery – Term criticizing labor exploitation

=== Prominent campaigners for the anti-sweatshop movement ===
- Lady Astor – British politician (1879–1964)
- Alfred Deakin – Second prime minister of Australia (1856–1919)
- Alfred George Gardiner – English journalist, editor and author (1865–1946)
- Vida Goldstein – Australian suffragist and social reformer (1869–1949)
- Florence Kelley – American activist (1859–1932)
- Charles Kernaghan – American activist (1948–2022)
- Mary Reid Macarthur – British labour organizer, editor (1880–1921)
- Samuel Mauger – Australian politician (1857-1936)
- R. H. Tawney – English philosopher (1880–1962)
- Rutherford Waddell – New Zealand Presbyterian minister and social reformer (1850–1932)

=== Organizations supporting the anti-sweatshop movement ===
- China Labour Bulletin – Non-governmental organization
- Clean Clothes Campaign
- Fashion Revolution – Not-for-profit social movement
- Global Exchange – US-based non-profit organization
- Green America – US non-profit organization
- Hong Kong Christian Industrial Committee
- Institute for Global Labour and Human Rights – Non-governmental organization
- International Labor Rights Forum – Nonprofit organization
- International Labour Organization – Specialized agency of the United Nations
- Rugmark – Indian non-profit organizations
- UNITE HERE – North American labor union
- United Students Against Sweatshops – United States student organization for worker rights
- WE Charity – Canadian charity
- Worker Rights Consortium – US labor rights organization
