= Human trafficking in Jordan =

Jordan ratified the 2000 UN TIP Protocol in June 2009.

Jordan is a source, destination, and transit country for adults and children subjected to forced labor and, to a lesser extent, sex trafficking. Women from Southeast Asia and East Africa voluntarily migrate to Jordan for employment among the estimated 50,000 foreign domestic workers in the country; some domestic workers are subjected to forced labor. Many of these workers are unable to return to their home countries due to pending criminal charges against them or due to their inability to pay overstay penalties or plane fare home. Some migrant workers from Egypt - the largest source of foreign labor in Jordan - experience forced labor in the construction, service, and agricultural sectors. Syrians may face forced labor in the agricultural sector, while some refugee children are subjected to the worst forms of child labor. Men and women from throughout Asia migrate to work in factories in Jordan's garment industry where some workers experience forced labor. Jordan's sponsorship system places a significant amount of power in the hands of employers and recruitment agencies, preventing workers from switching employers or receiving adequate access to legal recourse in response to abuse. Some Sri Lankan women engaged in prostitution in the country may be trafficking victims.

The Government of Jordan does not fully comply with the minimum standards for the elimination of human trafficking; however, it is making significant efforts to do so. During 2015, the government substantially increased efforts to prosecute and convict trafficking offenders, and continued to identify and refer to protection services an increased number of trafficking victims. Authorities also increased referrals of trafficking victims to a government-run shelter for gender-based violence (GBV) victims; as of early 2014, this shelter provided specific care for trafficking victims. Furthermore, in March 2015, the government completed construction of a shelter dedicated exclusively to trafficking victims, and was in the process of equipping and staffing the facility at the end of the reporting period; it was also in the process of drafting a national victim referral mechanism at the end of the reporting period. Though the government improved its law enforcement and victim identification and referral efforts, it did not systematically investigate potential cases of trafficking that involved withholding of passports and wages. Trafficking victims - particularly domestic workers who ran away from abusive employers - continued to face arrest and imprisonment. According to Jordanian laws, domestic workers that leave employers and break their work contracts should be subject to deportation and not imprisonment. There is no article within the residency laws that implies imprisonment as punishment for violating residency or labour regulations.

The U.S. State Department's Office to Monitor and Combat Trafficking in Persons placed the country in "Tier 2" in 2017 and 2023.

In 2023, the Organised Crime Index noted that tighter border control during Covid had reduced cross-border trafficking; however, it also noted that organ trafficking had increased.

== Prosecution ==
The government has significantly increased law enforcement efforts to combat all forms of trafficking, including those involving the most vulnerable populations. The 2009 anti-human trafficking law prohibits all forms of sex and labor trafficking and prescribes penalties of six months’ to 10 years’ imprisonment for child trafficking, trafficking of women and girls, and forced prostitution; these penalties are sufficiently stringent, but not commensurate with those prescribed for other serious crimes, such as rape. Penalties prescribed for labor trafficking offenses are not sufficiently stringent; offenses against adult male victims that do not involve aggravating circumstances are limited to a minimum of six months’ imprisonment and a fine. Jordan's labor law assigns administrative penalties for labor violations committed against Jordanian or foreign workers, yet these penalties are not sufficiently stringent to deter the crime of human trafficking. The withholding of passports is a crime under Jordan's passport law, which prescribes six months’ to three years’ imprisonment, as well as financial penalties.

In 2016, the labour ministry administered misconduct warnings to 27 different domestic worker recruitment agencies and also shut down eight others, after receiving almost 1000 complaints and having to deal with approximately 1,500 runaway cases. That same year, the counter-trafficking unit investigated 30 confirmed human trafficking cases, and also sent 196 victims to shelters, the vast majority of victims being domestic workers. The labour ministry is trying to put measures in place to reduce the amount of illegal domestic workers, of the 100,000 domestic workers in Jordan, around 30,000 are illegal workers according to the Domestic Helpers Recruitment Agencies Association (DHRAA). Many of these workers do not even know that they are considered to be illegal, by leaving their employers due to unsuitable conditions or treatment and not contacting the agency for proper procedures, they infringe upon labour and residency laws.

== Protection ==
The Jordanian government continues to make progress in its efforts to proactively identify and protect trafficking victims. The government identified 121 female and 40 male victims in 2014; this represents an increase from 90 victims identified in the previous reporting period. The government referred 122 potential victims to a government-run shelter for GBV victims, a local NGO-operated shelter, and an international organization; this was a significant increase from 46 victim referrals in 2013. In March 2015, the government completed construction of a shelter solely dedicated to protecting trafficking victims; however, it was not operational and a designated budget was being developed cooperatively between the government and an international organization at the end of the reporting period. The government began development of a national victim referral mechanism; in the interim, it continued to shelter victims at a GBV facility and to refer victims to services. During the reporting period, the joint anti-trafficking unit agreed to regularly refer trafficking victims to a local NGO for legal aid; in December 2014, the unit referred five victims as a result of the agreement. In early 2014, the government officially expanded the mandate of a shelter for GBV victims to formalize its assistance to trafficking victims; it could house up to 50 female victims of violence and offered medical, psycho-social, educational, and legal assistance. The joint anti-trafficking unit referred 31 cases to the shelter during the reporting period and demonstrated professionalism and sensitivity when handling trafficking cases.

In January 2016, plans to establish a shelter for domestic workers was announced by the labour ministry, in hopes to assist in resolving illegal worker issues in Jordan. 300 residents should be able to be accommodated there, as well as be provided with the assistance to resolve their problems, and also to protect them. In October 2016, the Ministries of Health and Labour signed an agreement which allowed for housing inspections in residences of migrant garment workers working in the Qualified Industrial Zones (QIZ). With this, each year shows improvements to the previous, but several of the 18 QIZ factories still seem to violate human rights.

In 2020, condition violations and abuse of migrant workers in the QIZ factories were still being reported, additional enforcement of the laws and codes drastically need to be implemented in order to help Jordan employers change the way that employees have been treated for so long. The President of the Domestic Helpers Recruitment Agencies Association, Khaled Hseinat, reported in 2020 that increases in domestic worker rentals was directly related to the Ministry of Labour putting a new system into effect, which prevents owners of the recruitment agencies to follow up or hire domestic workers after they have been in Jordan for three months. According to a labour rights lawyer, through the implementation of this three month rule it is making the process for domestic workers shorter when it comes to filing a complaint, since the worker no longer has to go through the agency to do so.

== Prevention ==
The government continued efforts to prevent trafficking. The anti-trafficking committee met twice during the reporting period and its technical committee met 10 times. In April 2014, the anti-trafficking committee published a report documenting Jordan's anti-trafficking efforts from 2010 to 2014. The government continued to distribute anti-trafficking brochures to foreign migrants at border crossings, police stations, airports, and in the garment sector. The government did not report taking measures to reduce the demand for commercial sex acts or forced labor. The government did not provide specific anti-trafficking training or guidance for its diplomatic personnel. The Ministry of Foreign Affairs reported its finance department directly paid locally hired domestic staff of Jordanian diplomats posted abroad, in accordance with labor laws and wage rates in the host country. The government did not provide specific anti-trafficking training for its peacekeepers before their deployment abroad. According to the DHRAA, in 2017 there were 150 licensed recruiting agencies for domestic workers available in Jordan. Also, it was reported that same year, that the labour ministry and anti-trafficking departments had increased the number of inspections on those recruiting agencies in order to immediately detect any violations and take action. In continuing with the efforts from the national anti-human trafficking committee and its various partners, the 2019–2022 anti-human trafficking strategy was announced in April 2019. Together with EU, Jordan plans to implement a strategy covering the prevention, protection, prosecution and cooperation in eliminating human trafficking. The draft also included the establishment of a fund to assist those affected by human trafficking. In March 2019, an amendment to the 2019 Anti-Human Trafficking Law was approved by the Cabinet and which was directly associated to increasing the punishments to those charged of crimes related to human trafficking. In the summer of 2021, Jordans’ Interior Minister Mazen Faraiah and Qatari Prime Minister and Minister of Interior Sheikh Khalid Bin Khalifa Al Thani signed an agreement for security cooperation in order to combat all forms of crime, specifically in the fields of counterterrorism and human trafficking among others.

== See also ==
- Slavery in Jordan
