= Fair Labor Association =

- Washington, D.C.
- Formation: 1999
- Type: Non-profit
- President & CEO: Jeff Vockrodt
- Chair - Board of Directors: Chris Lu
- Website: fairlabor.org

The Fair Labor Association (FLA) is a non-profit, multi stakeholder initiative of corporations, universities, and civil society organizations aimed at protecting the rights of workers in the global supply chain.

It describes its mission as promoting adherence to international and national labor laws. The organization has been the subject of criticism for allegedly undermining effectiveness of worker's labor unions, and for the group's close ties to the companies whose factories it monitors; the organization's board of directors includes several corporate representatives.

== History ==
The FLA was established in 1999 and evolved out of a task force created by US President Bill Clinton following a series of child labor, sweatshops, and other labor scandals involving major apparel and footwear brands. The apparel and footwear companies and labor and human rights groups involved in the initial task force formed a loose organization known as the Apparel Industry Partnership (AIP) in 1996. In 1999, the AIP’s charter document was amended to establish the FLA.

From 2001 to 2013, Auret van Heerden was the president and CEO of the FLA. From 2015 to 2023, the FLA was led by Sharon Waxman, previously the vice president for public policy and advocacy at the International Rescue Committee (IRC), and formerly the senior national security advisor to U.S. Senator Edward Kennedy (D-MA). Jeff Vockrodt has been the president and CEO since December 2023.

== Initiatives ==
=== Monitoring and verification ===
Companies that join the FLA commit to upholding the FLA Workplace Code of Conduct, which is underpinned by "International Labour Organization standards and internationally accepted good labor practices", and to establishing internal systems for monitoring workplace conditions and maintaining code standards throughout their supply chains. The FLA conducts independent and unannounced audits of factories used by FLA affiliates to evaluate compliance of all code elements and verify companies' internal compliance efforts.

The FLA monitors factories all over the world, including the Americas; Europe, Middle East, and Africa (EMEA); South Asia; South East Asia; and East Asia. There are currently over 4,500 facilities subject to FLA independent monitoring. On average, FLA accredited monitors conduct approximately 150 proactive, announced assessments and verification visits per year. FLA affiliates are responsible for working with the facilities following an inspection to develop a corrective action plan (CAP) to address any violations of the code and for conducting follow-up visits to ensure the plan is implemented. The FLA also conducts follow-up visits for a select group of audits to verify the actions taken by the FLA affiliate and supplier.

The FLA external monitoring system promotes transparency. The FLA posts the results of factory audits on its website, as well as the actions plans that FLA-affiliated companies develop with their suppliers to correct any issues that are found.

The FLA also promotes a complaint channel for third parties in cases where there is a persistent or serious labor violation in a production facility used by any FLA-affiliated company, and where other grievance mechanisms or lack of procedures have failed workers. Any person, organization, or company may file a complaint with the FLA, as all stakeholders have a role in improving corporate accountability for labor rights. When merited, the FLA oversees investigations and corrective action for any violations found.

=== Worker’s wages ===
In 2019, the FLA created a dashboard to organize global wage data. The dashboard was completed in part because of a €15,000 commitment from ASN Bank, and allows organizations to input wage data and see it visually compared with international standards. The dashboard measures the average worker's wage within a given facility by collecting data from several categories, including base wages, incentives, and benefits. The dashboard is intended to help businesses, governments, NGOs, and others track global wages and identify where workers are not earning fair wages. The dashboard will be part of ASN Bank's 2019 Living Wage Report.

In April 2018, FLA released a report that garment workers in Bangladesh are among the worst-paid in the world. The report found that workers would need an 80% pay raise to earn wages close to the report's most conservative living wage benchmark, 13,620 taka per month. In September 2018, Bangladeshi unions rejected an increase in the minimum wage (raising it to 8,000 taka or $95.50 a month) demanding more be done.

In 2019, the FLA was part of a group of global trade associations representing garment, footwear, and travel goods buyers who sent a joint letter to the Cambodian government, urging it to improve labor and human rights conditions. The letter came as the EU and U.S. were reviewing trade agreements with Cambodia over perceived human rights and democratic setbacks.

=== Addressing forced labor ===
In October 2018, the FLA and the American Apparel & Footwear Association (AAFA) announced the AAFA/FLA Apparel & Footwear Industry Commitment to Responsible Recruitment. Since the announcement, more than 130 apparel and footwear companies have signed the Commitment. The FLA and the AAFA developed the Commitment to address forced labor risks for migrant workers. Each signatory company commits to working with its partners so that no worker pays for their job; workers retain control of their travel documents; and workers are informed of the basic terms of employment before joining the workforce.

In November 2018, the FLA published a research report commissioned the Consumer Goods Forum (CGF). The report highlighted the risks of forced labor among workers, particularly migrants from neighboring countries, in the palm oil supply chain in Indonesia and Malaysia. The report indicates it is important that workers have access to functioning grievance mechanisms, and called for collaboration to tackle forced labor issues.

In January 2020, in response to reports of forced labor in China’s Xinjiang region, the FLA cautioned that due diligence in the region would not be enough to detect or rule out forced labor. This was due to a few issues including travel restrictions to the region. In March, the FLA called for the U.S. government to engage with the EU and other countries to establish a direct diplomatic channel to address the issue with the Chinese government. The association directed its affiliates to review their direct and indirect sourcing relationships to make sure they are in line with FLA principles. It also called for companies to identify the identification of alternate sourcing options opportunities, and said it would work with the government and other groups to find solutions to end human rights violations in the region. Because of forced labor reports, U.S. lawmakers called for American companies and consumers to stop buying goods produced in Xinjiang factories.

At the end of 2020, FLA banned the use of cotton and textiles from the Xinjiang region because of workers' rights violations. It was the first time the organization prohibited sourcing from a specific country/region.

== FLA affiliates ==
FLA affiliates are partners in implementing the FLA Workplace Code of Conduct and developing and sharing best practices in labor compliance globally. FLA-affiliated companies represent a large spectrum of industry. The overwhelming majority of factories the FLA audits are in the apparel sector (approximately 75%), followed by footwear, equipment, and accessories. Other industries represented in the FLA supplier database include collectibles, jewelry, hosiery, paper products, home goods, electronic products, and bags. FLA-affiliated companies fall under different categories: Participating Company, Participating Supplier, Category B Collegiate Licensee, Category C Collegiate Licensee, or Category D Collegiate Licensee. Participating Companies and Participating Suppliers submit their entire supply chain to the FLA independent external monitoring process and commit to a range of obligations as affiliates of the FLA.

The human and labor rights violations in domestic and overseas supply chains that surfaced in the mid-1990s were brought to the forefront on university and college campuses by student activists and national human rights groups. In response, universities joined companies and civil society organizations, including trade unions, in opposition to sweatshop labor. There are currently 208 colleges and universities that are affiliated with the FLA. Over 2,000 collegiate licensees that produce products for these institutions have joined the FLA. These licensees are required to disclose the names of facilities producing collegiate products and to uphold the FLA Workplace Code of Conduct in these facilities. High-revenue licensees and those with substantial overseas suppliers must submit their facilities to the FLA independent external monitoring process as well.

In 2019 the FLA board passed a requirement that requires FLA affiliates to disclose their factory lists.

== FLA accreditation of labor compliance programs ==
In order to receive accreditation from the Fair Labor Association, participating companies must demonstrate substantial compliance with the Workplace Code of Conduct throughout their supply chain. They must also undergo performance reviews, independent factory monitoring, verification of remediation initiatives, and a thorough evaluation of their internal protocols and auditing, as well as extensive training through the FLA.

The FLA board of directors must vote to accredit the labor compliance programs of participating companies. As of 2020, the FLA Board had accredited the labor compliance programs of Patagonia, New Balance, Burton, Under Armour, Mountain Equipment Co-op, Knights Apparel, and others.

== Support for the FLA initiative ==
In his opening remarks to the Voluntary Principles Plenary in Oslo, UN Special Representative on Business and Human Rights John Ruggie held up the FLA as a model multi-stakeholder initiative: "The gold standard among voluntary initiatives, I think, is the Fair Labor Association. It leads the way precisely because its Secretariat is encouraged and even mandated to cast a critical eye on performance and to recommend practical innovations—to stay focused like a laser on the effectiveness and legitimacy of the effort as a whole."

Writing for MarketWatch in March 2017, Casey O'Connor and Sarah Labowitz of the NYU Stern Center for Business and Human Rights recognized the FLA's "sound model for developing and monitoring labor standards in the apparel industry" as an example for other organizations to follow in reporting on social responsibility indicators of interest to impact investors.

== Criticism ==
The organization United Students Against Sweatshops have stated that the FLA has "... a weak code that fails to provide for women's rights, a living wage, the full public disclosure of factory locations, or university control over the monitoring process." WAAKE-UP! was also critical of the Fair Labor Association as much of its funding comes from organizations it monitors, creating a potential conflict of interest. The organization FLA Watch monitors the Fair Labor Association.

=== Assessment of Foxconn ===
On January 25, 2012, The New York Times published an extensive exposé concerning hazardous working conditions at factories in China run by Foxconn, a major supplier of Apple iPads. The report documented widespread violations of workers' rights, including the use of excessive overtime, crowded dorms, and the use of poisonous chemicals causing worker fatalities. An explosion at a factory in May 2011 had killed four workers and injured a further 18. At least 19 Foxconn workers had attempted suicide or fell from buildings in manners that suggested suicide attempts.

Shortly before the publication of the New York Times story on Foxconn, on January 13, 2012, Apple became a dues paying corporate member of the FLA. Subsequently, the group was hired by Apple to conduct inspections of the factories of the company's suppliers. On February 16, 2012, after taking a guided tour of Foxconn, FLA president Auret van Heerden said, "The facilities are first-class; the physical conditions are way, way above average of the norm", and "Foxconn is really not a sweatshop" and that "workers are very outspoken and they're not intimidated at all."

Van Heerden's praise of Foxconn's labor conditions were widely criticized. The New York Times noted that "Mr. van Heerden’s apparent praise of conditions at Foxconn came despite previous reports of employees committing suicide, dying in factory explosions and complaining of sometimes working more than 70 hours a week." Reuters' similarly noted that his comments came "following reports of worker suicides, a plant explosion and slave-like conditions" at Foxconn.

Worker Rights Consortium executive director Scott Nova said, "Generally, in a labor rights investigation, the findings come after the evidence is gathered, not the other way around. I'm amazed that the FLA would give one of the most notoriously abusive factories in the world a clean bill of health—based, it appears, on nothing more than a guided tour provided by the owner."

Heather White, the founder of monitoring group Verite, said of Van Heerden's remarks: "That he would make any comments prior to workers being interviewed off-site in a confidential environment is somewhat premature, to say the least. He doesn’t speak Chinese and he is not a trained auditor qualified to make quick assessments."

Van Heerden also explained the rash of suicides at Foxconn by saying: "I was very surprised when I walked onto the floor at Foxconn, how tranquil it is compared with a garment factory. So the problems are not the intensity and burnout and pressure-cooker environment you have in a garment factory. It's more a function of monotony, of boredom, of alienation perhaps."

Teresa Cheng, an international campaigns coordinator for United Students Against Sweatshops, said "Mr. van Heerden's comments are outrageous and shocking, even to those of us who have been monitoring the FLA's irresponsible reporting for years. Attributing the suicides of sweatshop workers who make iPhones to mere boredom is insulting and the FLA's most creative argument to date for defending its corporate funders."

== See also ==
- International Labour Organization
- Labor rights
- NYU Stern Center for Business and Human Rights
- Worker Rights Consortium
- Multistakeholder Model
