= Clean Clothes Campaign =

Organization

- Schone Kleren Kampagne
- Abbreviation: CCC
- Established: 1989; 37 years ago
- Type: Umbrella organisation
- Registration no.: 41210820
- Location: Netherlands
- Origins: Fair trade, labour movement
- Region served: Global, 46 countries
- Method: Consumer education, corporate campaigns
- Fields: Garment & sportswear industries
- Members: 224 organisations (2026)
- Official language: English
- Subsidiaries: Fashion Check, Transparency Pledge
- Website: cleanclothes.org

The Clean Clothes Campaign (CCC) is the garment industry's largest alliance of labour unions and non-governmental organizations. The civil society campaign focuses on the improvement of working conditions in the garment and sportswear industries. Formed in the Netherlands in 1989, the CCC has campaigns in 15 European countries: Austria, Belgium (North and South), Denmark, Finland, France, Germany, Italy, Ireland, Netherlands, Norway, Poland, Spain, Sweden, Switzerland and the United Kingdom. The CCC works with a partner network of more than 200 organizations around the world.

== Activities ==
=== Consumer education ===
The CCC publicizes through educational programmes, demonstrations, advertisement, debates, books, rallies and news outlets information related to the production of clothes and the misuse of garment workers.

The artist Siobhan Wall became the campaign's artist in residence where she curated The Clothes She Wears, a collection of clothes worn by eight women working in the garment industry. The show toured to Paris, Worthing, Ghent, and Utrecht as well as the Royal Geographical Society and The Fashion and Textile Museum in London.

== Partners ==
- Switzerland: Public Eye
- Germany: FEMNET

== See also ==
- Fairwear Australia
- Sweatshop
- International Labour Organization conventions
- Christian Initiative Romero
- Child labor
