= United Students Against Sweatshops =

United States student organization for worker rights

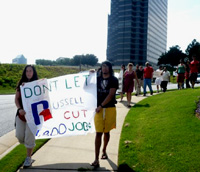
- Members of United Students Against Sweatshops march outside the offices of Russell Corporation in Atlanta GA, during a protest against Russell's worker rights violations at its Honduras factories.
- Abbreviation: USAS (pronounced "you-sass")
- Formation: 1998
- Type: Student activist organization
- Location: North America
- Website: usas.org

United Students Against Sweatshops (USAS) is a student organization founded in 1998 with chapters at over 250 colleges and universities in the United States and Canada. In April 2000, USAS founded the Worker Rights Consortium (WRC), an independent monitoring organization that investigates labor conditions in factories that produce collegiate apparel all over the world. The WRC exacts an annual membership fee from participating universities, which is used to fund its monitoring work.

The WRC works with NGOs, human rights groups, and local labor unions or federations, in countries where collegiate apparel is produced. At present over 180 universities and colleges have affiliated with the WRC. USAS is also proposing that universities sign on to the Designated Suppliers Program (DSP), which would act to source collegiate apparel from factories that respect workers' rights to form unions and be paid living wages.

In 2000, Nike and other major clothing corporations renamed the Apparel Industry Partnership (AIP) the Fair Labor Association (FLA), in large part to compete with the WRC. The AIP, an initiative of the Clinton Administration, had become a discredited organization, because all non-profit organizations and unions that had initially supported it, withdrew from it, with the exception of the International Labor Rights Fund (ILRF), who subsequently withdrew their institutional membership on the FLA Board soon afterwards.

Focusing on domestic as well as international sweatshops, the group has built coalitions of students, labor groups, workers, and community members that focus on a range of campaigns:

- requesting that Russell Brands Athletic Brand significantly alter its labor policies in Central America
- campaigning to get Nike, Inc. to pay severance pay to workers in Honduras laid off by subcontractors
- protesting against Jessica Matthews, board member of Hanes and president of the Carnegie Endowment for International Peace, in relation to sweatshop conditions for Hanes workers in the Dominican Republic.

== See also ==
- Worker Rights Consortium
- International Labour Organization conventions
- 180/Movement for Democracy and Education
