= Worker Rights Consortium =

US labor rights organization

The Worker Rights Consortium (WRC) is an independent labor rights monitoring organization focused on protecting the rights of workers who sew apparel and make other products sold in the United States, particularly those bearing college or university logos. The WRC was founded in 2000 by student activists including members of United Students Against Sweatshops.
