= List of people who have been pied =

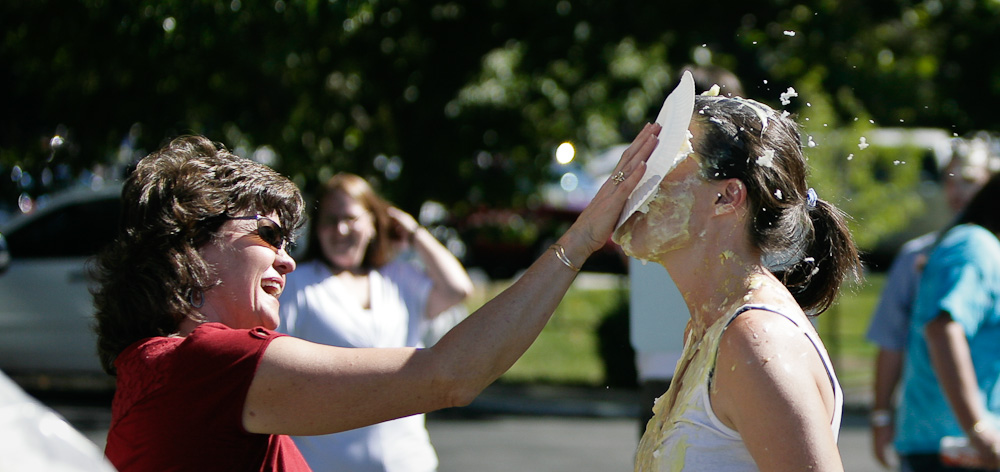
Taking a cream pie in the face

This is a list of well-known people who have been pied without consent. Consensual pieing is excluded from this list.

== List ==
Victim	Notoriety	Date (Note: In some cases, the air date or release date is listed when the actual date is not available.)	Details	Location	Perpetrator(s)	Source
Jimmie Åkesson	Leader of Sweden Democrats	November 5, 2013	Book signing	Nytorget, Stockholm, Sweden	Irene Matkowitzc, who was later pied by supporters of Åkesson	
Leszek Balcerowicz	Deputy Prime Minister of Poland, Ministry of Finance of the Republic of Poland, President of The National Bank of Poland, economist, chairman of the Freedom Union	November 21, 2000	Giving a lecture	University of Warsaw, Poland	Maciej Roszak and other anarchists from Rozbrat	
Yolanda Barcina	President of the Chartered Community of Navarre	October 27, 2011	Working Community of the Pyrenees plenary Council	Toulouse, France	Mugitu! movement against High Speed Rail Line	
Abraham Beame	New York City mayor	August 30, 1977	Mayoralty-campaign primary debate	Cooper Union, New York City, United States	Aron Kay	
Kim Beazley	Australian Opposition Leader	June 18, 1999	Asia-Pacific Economic Cooperation lecture	Melbourne, Australia	Biotic Baking Brigade	
Medea Benjamin	United States Green Party activist	July 1, 2007	United States Social Forum	Atlanta, Georgia, United States	Bakers Without Borders	
James Bonk	Chemistry professor	Spring 1975	During a university chemistry lecture	Duke University	A member of a student organization called Pie Die	
John Boscawen	New Zealand ACT Party MP	May 25, 2009	Mount Albert by-election debate	Auckland, New Zealand	Malcolm France	
Georges-Louis Bouchez	Leader of Reformist Movement	September 2, 2023	Book signing	Liège, Belgium		
Pierre Bourque	Montreal mayor	January 18, 1999	Montreal news conference	Montreal, Quebec, Canada	Les Entartistes	
Steve Bracks	Victorian Premier	September 11, 2000	World Economic Forum annual meeting	Melbourne, Australia	Marcus Brumer	
Robert Bresson	Film director	1969			Noël Godin	
Dave Bronconnier	Calgary mayor	June 2007	Calgary Stampede	Calgary, Alberta, Canada	Donna McPhee	
Jerry Brown	Governor of California	October 25, 1979	Preceding a campaign speech	Cooper Union, New York City, United States	Aron Kay	
Willie Brown	San Francisco mayor	November 11, 1998	During speech	San Francisco, California, United States	Biotic Baking Brigade	
Anita Bryant	Singer and anti-gay rights activist	October 14, 1977	Press conference	Des Moines, Iowa, United States	Thomas Lawrence Higgins	
William F. Buckley Jr.	Conservative political commentator	April 12, 1976		New York University	Aron Kay	
Melky Cabrera	Center fielder, New York Yankees	April 22, 2009	After walk-off home run	Yankee Stadium, Bronx, New York	A.J. Burnett	
Melky Cabrera	Center fielder, New York Yankees	May 24, 2009	After walk-off hit	Yankee Stadium, Bronx, New York	A.J. Burnett	
Michel Camdessus	International Monetary Fund Director	February 12, 2000		Bangkok, Thailand		
Robinson Canó	Second baseman, New York Yankees	August 28, 2009	After walk-off home run (he has been pied twice)	Yankee Stadium, Bronx, New York	A.J. Burnett	
Jean Chrétien	Prime Minister of Canada	August 16, 2000		Charlottetown, Prince Edward Island	Evan Brown	
Jeremy Clarkson	Journalist and TV personality	September 12, 2005	Before receiving an honorary degree in engineering from Oxford Brookes University	Oxford	Environmentalists	
Charles Colson	Watergate conspirator, Christian crusader	February 10, 1978		Fairmont Hotel, San Francisco	Jayson Wechter	
Ann Coulter	Conservative columnist (missed)	October 21, 2004	Lecture	The University of Arizona	Les Entartistes	
Johnny Damon	Left fielder, New York Yankees	May 17, 2009	After walk-off home run	Yankee Stadium, Bronx, New York	A.J. Burnett	
Gábor Demszky	Mayor of Budapest	February 9, 2006			Tamás "Tomcat" Polgár	
Stéphane Dion	Canadian politician	May 7, 1999		Montreal, Quebec	Patrick Robert	
Jean Doré	Former mayor of Montreal	October 28, 1998		Montreal, Quebec; the incident happened when Doré was doing a TV interview	Les Entartistes	
Ujjal Dosanjh	Canadian politician	March 11, 1999	Due to his involvement in the Gustafsen Lake Standoff	Simon Fraser University, Burnaby, Canada, during an impromptu press conference	Meringue Marauders	
Philippe Douste-Blazy	French politician				Noël Godin	
Jacques Duchesneau	Canadian politician				Les Entartistes	
Marguerite Duras	French novelist	c. 1969			Noël Godin	
James Ehnes	Violin soloist	February 15, 2004	After a performance with the Dallas Symphony Orchestra, to celebrate that feat, and his friendship with Nathan Frantz	Dallas Westin City Center	Ben Guthrie	
Pim Fortuyn	Dutch politician	March 14, 2002	Book presentation	The Hague, Netherlands	Biotic Baking Brigade	
Milton Friedman	Economist	October 9, 1998	At a corporate conference	San Francisco, California	Al Decker	
Thomas Friedman	Op-ed contributor to The New York Times	April 22, 2008	Lecture at Brown University	Providence, Rhode Island	Student Margaree Little and an unidentified male	
Courtney Friel	Journalist, news anchor and reporter	April 6, 2008	News report at Ringling Bros. Circus for Fox News	Ringling Bros Circus, Madison Square Garden, New York City	Tom Dougherty	
Bill Gates	Founder and CEO of Microsoft	February 4, 1998	Meeting of the European Union	Brussels, Belgium	Four tarts by Brian Keegan and Rémy Belvaux	
Dan Glickman	United States Secretary of Agriculture	May 31, 2000	National Nutrition Summit	Washington, D.C.	Arathi Jayaram	
Jean-Luc Godard	Film director	May 10, 1985	Shaving cream pie; in protest against his film Hail Mary during the Cannes Film Festival	Cannes, France	Noël Godin	
Carl XVI Gustaf	King of Sweden	September 5, 2001	During a visit to Varberg	Varberg, Halland	A 16-year-old boy	
Karl-Theodor zu Guttenberg	German politician of the Christian Social Union	February 2012		Berlin, Germany	Hedonist International	
Göran Hägglund	Leader of Christian Democrats, Minister for Health and Social Affairs	August 18, 2014	Party rally	Kungsportsplatsen, Gothenburg, Sweden	Member of the Fag Army	
Jerry Hairston Jr.	Pinch hitter, New York Yankees	October 18, 2009	walk-off error	Yankee Stadium, Bronx, New York	A.J. Burnett	
Denny Hamlin	Racecar driver, Joe Gibbs Racing	September 15, 2006	Hamlin had pied fellow driver Kevin Harvick the day before	New Hampshire Motor Speedway, Loudon, New Hampshire	Kevin Harvick	
Kevin Harvick	Racecar driver, Richard Childress Racing	September 14, 2006	On the show Live with Regis and Kelly	Manhattan, New York	Denny Hamlin	
David Horowitz	Conservative pundit	April 6, 2005				
E. Howard Hunt	Operative of White House Plumbers	March 23, 1977		Lobby of the RCA building, New York City	Aron Kay	
Charles Hurwitz	CEO of MAXXAM Corporation, parent company of Pacific Lumber				Biotic Baking Brigade	
David Icke	Conspiracy theorist, accused of anti-semitism	April 18, 2000	During a book signing	Granville Book Company bookstore, Vancouver, British Columbia, Canada	Meringue Marauders	
Jacek Jaśkowiak	Mayor of Poznań	June 16, 2026	During a session of the Poznań City Council.	Poznań, Poland	member of the Rozbrat collective	
Guru Maharaj Ji	Spiritual leader of the Divine Light Mission	August 8, 1973	Detroit Common Council	Detroit, Michigan	Fifth Estate reporter Pat Halley, who was later beaten by followers of Ji	
Alan Joyce	CEO of Qantas	May 9, 2017	While speaking at a business conference.	Perth, Australia	Tony Overheu	
Lierre Keith	Author and radical environmentalist	March 13, 2010	15th annual Bay Area Anarchist Bookfair	San Francisco	Three anonymous vegan activists	
Clark Kerr	At UC Berkeley, Kerr was the first university president to call police to campus to mass arrest student protesters	October 14, 1969	During Kerr's lecture series to college administrators on how to divert and defeat the student movement	Indiana University School of Business lecture hall	James Retherford, former underground newspaper editor and Jerry Rubin ghost-writer	
Calvin Klein	Clothing designer (accidental hit)	June 2001	On the red carpet of a New York fashion awards ceremony	Lincoln Center, New York City	PETA activists	
Ralph Klein	Premier of Alberta	July 7, 2003	Premier's Stampede Breakfast	Calgary, Alberta, Canada	Banana-Cream Three	
William Kristol	Pundit, columnist, and editor of The Weekly Standard	March 29, 2005	Convocation at Earlham College	Richmond, Indiana	A student	
Sarah Kustok	Television sports sideline reporter	August 3, 2012	During a post-game interview with Chicago White Sox outfielder Alex Ríos	U.S. Cellular Field, Chicago, Illinois	A.J. Pierzynski	
Bernard Landry	Former Cabinet Minister and Quebec Premier	April 7, 2000	Escaped most of the pie, which hit two other speakers beside Landry	Marriott Château Champlain, Montreal, Quebec	Internationale des Anarchos Pâtissiers	
Roger D. Landry	Former President of La Presse newspaper	March 21, 1999	During Les Oliviers awards	Montreal	Les Entartistes	
Karl Lagerfeld	Clothing designer (target missed)					
Otto N. Larsen	Commission Chairman	May 13, 1970	President's Commission on Obscenity and Pornography		Tom Forçade	
André-Joseph Léonard	Archbishop of Mechelen-Brussels	April 6, 2011	A public speech	Université catholique de Louvain	"The Glooper", to protest the Catholic Church's stands on abortion and homosexuality	
Carl Levin	US Senator	August 16, 2010	Armed Services Committee chairman's meeting	Big Rapids, Michigan	Ahlam M. Mohsen	
Bernard-Henri Lévy	French philosopher	On at least eight occasions, between 1985 and 2015		Brussels (1985), Namur (2015)	Noël Godin	
Christian Lindner	German politician of the Free Democratic Party	January 9, 2025	Shaving cream pie; during an election campaign event	Greifswald, Germany	A member of The Left	
Lucy Liu	Actress	January 29, 2013	Late Night With Jimmy Fallon	NBC Studios, Midtown Manhattan, New York City	Jimmy Fallon and herself	
Bjørn Lomborg	Danish author	September 5, 2001	At a book event for The Skeptical Environmentalist	Oxford, England	Mark Lynas	
Blairo Maggi	Brazilian plantation farmer	September 7, 2003		Cuiabá, Brazil	Confeiteiros sem Fronteiras	
Peter Mandelson	British politician	March 6, 2009		London		
Hideki Matsui	Designated hitter, New York Yankees	July 20, 2009	After walk-off home run	Yankee Stadium, Bronx, New York	A.J. Burnett	
Daniel Patrick Moynihan	American politician	September 5, 1976		Intersection of Delancey and Orchard Streets, New York City	Aron Kay	
Rupert Murdoch	Australian-American media mogul	July 19, 2011	Giving evidence before a Parliament select committee	Portcullis House, London	Jonnie Marbles	
Ralph Nader	American attorney, political activist and presidential candidate	September 12, 2003	News conference endorsing Peter Camejo for recall governor	San Francisco	Unidentified male	
Michael O'Leary	Irish businessman and CEO of Ryanair	September 7, 2023	Press conference	Brussels, Belgium	Unidentified climate activists	
Jacques Parizeau	Former premier of Quebec	November 1998		Ahuntsic College, Montreal	Bruno Caron	
Pierre Karl Péladeau	President and CEO of Quebecor Media Inc.	October 19, 2004		Montreal, Quebec (UQAM)	Les Entartistes	
Pierre Pettigrew	Canadian Human Resources Minister	January 18, 1999	News conference	Montreal, Quebec, Canada	Entartistes	
Fred Phelps	Religious activist	May 31, 2003		Des Moines, Iowa, United States		
Jim Rhodes	Governor of Ohio	August 17, 1977	Opening ceremony of the 124th annual Ohio State Fair	Columbus, Ohio	Demonstrator protesting the building of a gym at Kent State University	
Bosse Ringholm	Sweden's Minister for Finance	April 17, 2001	During a ceremonial procession on his way to a presentation of Sweden's state budget	Drottninggatan, Stockholm	Stockholm Pie Brigade	
Allan Rock	Canadian ambassador to the United Nations	January 24, 2000		Montreal, Quebec		
Alex Rodriguez	Third baseman, New York Yankees	May 16, 2009	After walk-off home run	Yankee Stadium, Bronx, New York	A.J. Burnett	
Alex Rodriguez	Third baseman, New York Yankees	August 7, 2009	After walk-off home run	Yankee Stadium, Bronx, New York	A.J. Burnett	
Ségolène Royal	French politician	June 16, 2006		La Rochelle, France	Jonathan Joly, student	
Renato Ruggiero	Former WTO director					
George Ryan	Governor of Illinois	May 1, 2000		Carbondale, Illinois	Dawn Roberts	
Phyllis Schlafly	Lawyer and conservative activist	April 16, 1977	Women's Republic Club luncheon	The Waldorf-Astoria, New York City	Aron Kay	
David Shayler	British spy					
David Schwarz	Australian rules footballer	June 14, 2001	On the set of The Footy Show	Melbourne, Australia	Sam Newman	
Gail Shea	Canadian Minister of Fisheries and Oceans	January 25, 2010	Canada Centre for Inland Waters speech	Burlington, Ontario	Emily McCoy, PETA activist	
Clare Short	British politician	March 5, 2001				
Jeffrey Skilling	CEO of Enron	June 21, 2001		Commonwealth Club of California	Francine Cavanaugh representing the Biotic Baking Brigade	
Sylvester Stallone	Action movie star	July 28, 1998	During the grand opening of a Planet Hollywood restaurant in Montreal	Montreal	Les Entartistes	
Nick Swisher	Right fielder, New York Yankees	September 8, 2009	After walk-off home run (he has been pied twice)	Yankee Stadium, Bronx, New York	A.J. Burnett	
Gerry Thompson	Magic: The Gathering professional player	August 1, 2010	During an interview with Mana Nation		Patrick Chapin	
Antoni Tokarczuk	Minister of Environment	November 20, 2000	For reducing the size of the Tatra National Park and the proposal to build a new dam on the Vistula river	IV. Ogólnopolski Zjazd Ekologiczny, Poznań, Poland	Janusz Korbel from Klub Dzikiej Przyrody (group of eco-activists from Łódź)	
Gérald Tremblay	Mayor of Montreal	June 18, 2002	Meeting to discuss the future of the city	Montreal, Quebec, Canada	Les Entartistes	
Beatrix von Storch	MEP deputy chairperson of German right wing party AfD	February 28, 2016	Protest against her demand to lethally use fire arms against refugees as a last resort to protect the German borders	Local party meeting in a hotel, Kassel, Germany	Peng Collective	
Claude Vorilhon	Leader of the Raëlian Movement	December 24, 1998			Les Entartistes	
Sahra Wagenknecht	German MP and deputy chairperson of The Left	May 28, 2016	Party conference of The Left	Magdeburg	Initiative Torten für Menschenfeinde (The Pies for Enemies of Humanity Initiative)	
Ann Widdecombe	British Shadow Home Secretary	April 20, 2000	Book signing for The Clematis Tree	Oxford University, England	Biotic Baking Brigade	
James Wolfensohn	Former president of the World Bank Group	October 29, 2001		Helsinki, Finland	Anti-World Bank protester	
Tommy Yune	Comic artist and anime director	July 1, 2007	Anime Expo 2007	Long Beach, California	Mr. Schiller	
Gerrit Zalm	Dutch politician	January 4, 1999	During the first day of trading in euros	Amsterdam Stock Exchange, the Netherlands	Biotic Baking Brigade / T.A.A.R.T.	

== See also ==
- Egging
- Incidents of objects being thrown at politicians
- List of practical joke topics
- List of shoe-throwing incidents
- List of slapstick comedy topics
- Pieing
- Shoeing
- Slapstick comedy
