= List of slapstick comedy topics =

This is a list of slapstick comedy topics. Slapstick is a type of broad physical comedy involving exaggerated, boisterous actions (e.g. a pie in the face), farce, violence and activities which may exceed the boundaries of common sense.

== Slapstick comedians ==
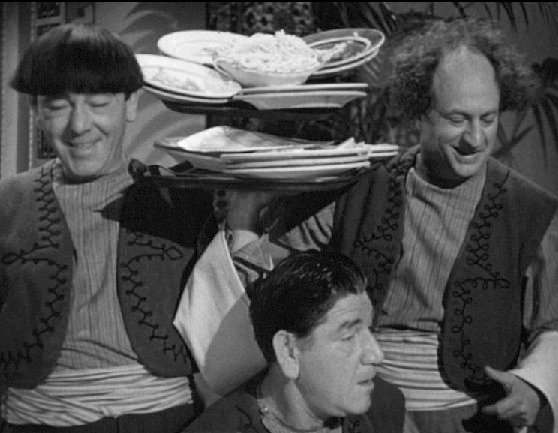
The Three Stooges during the Shemp years (1947–1956), as represented in Malice in the Palace

- Fred Karno
- Roscoe "Fatty" Arbuckle
- Buster Keaton
- Mark Twain
- [[[Hal Roach]]

[Mack Sennett]]

- The Marx Brothers
- Laurel and Hardy: Stan Laurel, Oliver Hardy
- Abbott and Costello: Bud Abbott, Lou Costello
- The Three Stooges members: Larry Fine, Moe Howard, Shemp Howard, Curly Howard, Joe DeRita, Joe Besser
- Woody Allen: Scenes from a Mall
- Peter Falk: The In-Laws
- Mel Brooks: Silent Movie
- Joe Roberts
- Neville Kennard
- Jaleel White
- Peter Sellers
- Robin Williams
- Will Ferrell
- Harry Langdon
- Wayne Knight
- Harold Lloyd
- Benny Hill
- David Margulies
- Rik Mayall
- Ian McNeice
- Sacha Baron Cohen
- Rowan Atkinson
- Léonce Perret
- Charles Prince
- Louis de Funès
- Jerry Lewis
- Will Hay
- Zucker, Abrahams and Zucker
- Sarah Duhamel
- Shim Hyung-rae
- Terry Jones
- Ritz Brothers
- Ton of Fun
- Norman Wisdom
- Roberto Mario Gómez Bolaños

== Slapstick films ==
Slapstick films are a type of comedy film that employ slapstick comedy. For a list of slapstick films, see Slapstick films.

== Techniques ==
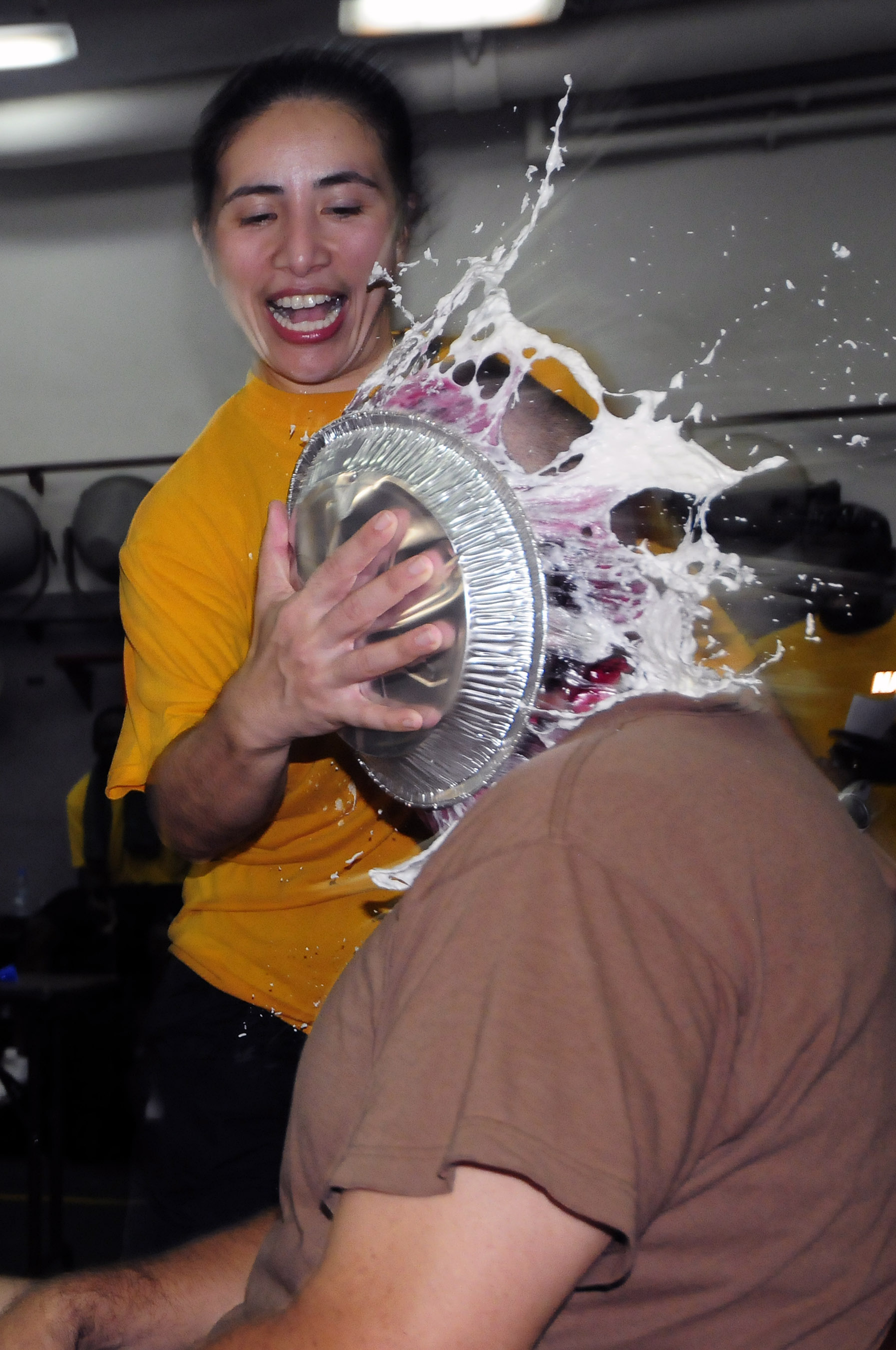
Pieing

- Eye poke
- Physical comedy
- Pieing
- Gunge
- Slap
- Liver punch

== See also ==
- Comedy film
- List of people who have been pied
- List of practical joke topics
- Physical comedy
