= WAAKE-UP! =

Former student and community coalition

WAAKE-UP! (World Awareness and Action Koalition of Equal United Progressives) was a student and community coalition at the University of Colorado Boulder (CU-Boulder) active from 1998 to 2001. WAAKE-UP! adopted the motto "Action without Awareness is ignorant. Awareness without Action is immoral." WAAKE-UP! supported many progressive causes, but were best known for the "Sweatshop Campaign," demanding that University of Colorado apparel be made in factories supporting fair labor conditions, specifically those endorsed by the Worker Rights Consortium. The Sweatshop Campaign was not successful, but its goals were later fulfilled by WAAKE-UP!'s successor organizations, 180 at 11 (180 degrees at the 11th hour), CASA (Coalition Against Sweatshop Apparel) and WWJC (World Workers Justice Committee). Like many other progressive organizations in Colorado their actions were recorded in the Denver Police Spy Files.

== The Sweatshop Campaign ==
In July 1996, the University of Colorado board of regents adopted the Talloires Declaration stating that the university must maintain "institutional neutrality in social and political matters" unless it is an issue that "directly affects the university, is detrimental to the achievement of the university's mission and purposes, and/or threatens academic freedom."

April 1, 1999 CU-Boulder's student union legislative council unanimously passed Council Resolution 106 suggesting CU regents, Chancellor Richard Byyny, and President John Buechner adopt a Basic Commitment to Human Rights, requiring them to take a stand against environmentally irresponsible investments and apparel contracts. The following Monday, April 5, WAAKE-UP! held a press conference asking the university to abandon its institutional neutrality policy for an "institutional integrity policy." WAAKE-UP! members asked the University of Colorado to stop investing in corporations committing human rights violations even if the investments were more lucrative than socially responsible alternatives. Specifically, WAAKE-UP! members were displeased with the university's investments in corporations like Chevron, Royal Dutch Shell, Louisiana-Pacific, Nike, Lehman Brothers (the parent company of Peabody Coal), Texaco and Unocal.

WAAKE-UP! faxed and emailed documentation violations of the Universal Declaration of Human Rights committed by corporations invested in by the University of Colorado to the regents, Byyny and Buechner, demanding they support Council Resolution 106 by April 12. None of the university officials responded.

On April 26, 1999, WAAKE-UP! held a rally at the Dalton Trumbo Fountain outside the University Memorial Center on the CU-Boulder campus encouraging the University of Colorado, to dissolve the university's neutrality policy on investments and sign a basic commitment to human rights. Byyny refused to meet with the protesters. In response, WAAKE-UP! organized a protest on April 28, 1999, blocking traffic at the intersection of Broadway and Regent Drive (located on the edge of the Boulder campus) until Byyny agreed to speak with them. He scheduled an appointment to speak with WAAKE-UP! members on April 30, 1999, at 8 a.m. WAAKE-UP! continued to organize and grow over the next year.

=== March 2000 ===
March 2, 2000, and again on March 15, 2000, WAAKE-UP! presented Chancellor Richard Byyny with a series of demands to ensure ethical apparel licensing was practiced by the University of Colorado. Byyny responded that he would consider adopting them but needed time, more community input, and expressed some specific concerns. Byyny questioned whether one of WAAKE-UP!'s demands, equal pay for women making University of Colorado apparel, was a human right or a cultural norm. According to the United Nations Universal Declaration of Human Rights it is not a cultural norm, Article 23, Section 2 states: "Everyone, without any discrimination, has the right to equal pay for equal work."

March 19, 2000, WAAKE-UP! members protested outside of the Abercrombie & Fitch store on the Pearl Street Mall in Boulder, Colorado, a few blocks away from the CU-Boulder campus. WAAKE-UP! claimed Abercrombie & Fitch laborers were exploited and worked in sweatshop conditions.

March 21, 2000, CU-Boulder professor Ira Chernus announced that he had written a resolution in support of WAAKE-UP!'s demands and that it would be voted on during the next Boulder Faculty Assembly. It included creating a Code of Conduct for Ethical Apparel Licensing as well as an Investment Board of Ethics which would be monitored by an Internal Advisory Board for compliance with the Code of Conduct. This was in addition to resolutions passed by the Assembly on March 13, 2000, calling for WAAKE-UP!, Byyny, and Vice Chancellor Ronald Stump to continue a good-faith discussion on University of Colorado apparel licensing. The resolutions were forwarded to the Chancellor's office on March 14, 2000.

=== April 2000 ===
April 4, 2000, WAAKE-UP! held a mock trial outside the University Memorial Center by the Dalton Trumbo Fountain with the "Sweatshop King", a 10-foot-tall (3.0 m) street theater puppet. University of Colorado police officers, Detective Tim DeLaria and Lt. Michelle Irving monitored the demonstration and took photographs of those participating. Both officers belonged to the Investigations and Community Service Unit of the University of Colorado Police Department.

April 5, 2000, WAAKE-UP! demanded that the University of Colorado join the Worker Rights Consortium by the end of the day on April 6, 2000. Meeting this deadline would have allowed representatives from the university to attend a Worker Rights Consortium meeting taking place in New York City on April 7, 2000.

April 6, 2000, the Boulder Faculty Assembly voted in favor of a resolution supporting WAAKE-UP!'s demands, though it didn't specifically include the requirement that the University of Colorado should join the Worker Rights Consortium. The resolution was passed on a voice vote with 30 faculty members in attendance, the vast majority voting in favor of it. The Assembly claimed that the United Nations Universal Declaration of Human Rights served as a basis for the proposed Code of Conduct. Byyny created an ad hoc group of ten CU-Boulder faculty, staff, and students to investigate WAAKE-UP!'s proposal. Byyny's ad hoc group's first meeting was behind closed doors, against Colorado's Open Meeting Law WAAKE-UP! was invited to attend the first meeting, but boycotted it in protest. A WAAKE-UP! member was present at all subsequent meetings.

The Boulder Faculty Assembly had organized three community forums in an effort to get the community input Byyny requested. Byyny never attended any of the forums organized by the Assembly. University of Colorado Vice Chancellor Paul Tabolt, however, attended one of the forums and raised a few questions, but left without giving forum attendees a chance to respond to them. Tabolt stated collective bargaining is not a right (an opinion not supported by the United Nations Universal Declaration of Human Rights) and that he believed it was fair to pay workers less than what they need to live.

April 7, 2000, the University of Colorado Student Union unanimously supported WAAKE-UP!'s demand that the university join the Worker Rights Consortium, passing on a vote of 13–0. However, this failed to produce any action from the Office of the Chancellor.

In the meantime WAAKE-UP! was busy circulating a petition among students demanding that the University of Colorado join the Worker Rights Consortium (gathering over 2000 signatures) and on April 10, 2000, and built a shantytown in the Norlin Quadrangle on the CU-Boulder campus to draw attention to their campaign and gain visibility during the Conference on World Affairs. In reference to the conference, WAAKE-UP! members named the shantytown the "Conference on World Despairs." WAAKE-UP! initially created the shantytown without the university's permission, but later obtained "temporary structure" permits after it was established. The construction of the shantytown started just hours before the Conference on World Affairs' opening procession through the Norlin Quadrangle. WAAKE-UP! said the shantytown was meant to symbolize the poor living conditions of sweatshop workers. WAAKE-UP!'s shantytown was reminiscent of a previous one constructed in 1988 outside the Dalton Trumbo Fountain to protest the University of Colorado's investment in the South African apartheid regime.

WAAKE-UP! members stayed at the shantytown in shifts during the day and night. During the day they held teach-ins, distributed fliers, and explained the purpose of the shantytown to passersby. Among other topics, WAAKE-UP! members discussed Gary Barnett's threats to suspend players covering up Nike logos on their uniforms. Community members and local businesses supported them by supplying food and water. At 3 a.m. on April 13, 2000, approximately ten people came by the shantytown and set off fireworks, threw water balloons and distributed flyers that read "kegs not contraversy [sic]." WAAKE-UP! members sleeping at the shantytown said they appreciated the nonviolent protest methods used by the "anti-protest protesters." April 15, 2000 WAAKE-UP! members staying at the shantytown abandoned it due to heavy snow, but later returned. April 17, 2000 more than 150 people attended a rally at WAAKE-UP!'s shantytown focusing on high school education and in solidarity with protests the previous day in Washington D.C. against the International Monetary Fund and World Bank. April 13, 2000, WAAKE-UP! began meeting with the ad hoc committee formed by Chancellor Byyny. Though both sides claimed progress was being made, the university administration favored joining the Fair Labor Association over the Worker Rights Consortium. WAAKE-UP! were critical of the Fair Labor Association as much of its funding came from organizations it monitored creating a potential conflict of interest.

April 17, 2000, the ad hoc group put together by Byyny recommended a one-year conditional membership in the Worker Rights Consortium, though it still needed to be approved by a larger ad hoc committee, appointed by the Chancellor, and the Chancellor himself. The committee also recommended they monitor the Fair Labor Association during that year to decide if it would be worth joining. Additionally, the committee raised some questions as to how the Code of Conduct would apply to contracts Nike had with the CU-Boulder athletics department, which operated somewhat autonomously.

By April 19, 2000, the larger ad hoc committee said it was putting the finishing touches on the Code of Conduct and were getting ready to send it to Byyny to review. WAAKE-UP! pressured Byyny to sign it as soon as he possibly could.

April 25, 2000, Chancellor Byyny announced that he would not sign the anti-sweatshop policy approved by the ad hoc committees. Instead, Byyny made some changes to the existing policy using the committee's recommendations as guidelines.

April 26, 2000, Ralph Nader visited the CU-Boulder campus. Nader endorsed WAAKE-UP!'s demands and condemned Byyny's decision not to join the Worker Rights Consortium. Nader speculated that the university's decision might be influenced by an announcement Phil Knight had recently made, stating that he would retract a thirty million dollar donation to the University of Oregon after they joined the Worker Rights Consortium.

WAAKE-UP! met with Byyny the same day. Byyny gave few specifics about his decision not to follow the committee's recommendations. A WAAKE-UP! member had brought a water gun to the meeting, and showed it to the police officers present. Later in the meeting officer Tim DeLaria attempted to grab the water gun out of the activist's hand, causing it to squirt two other officers. DeLaria attempted to arrest the activist for this, though Police Lt. John Kish reversed DeLaria's decision and let the water-gun carrying activist off with a warning. Professor Ira Chernus had protested the unnecessary show of force during this and previous meetings.

=== May 2000 ===
May 3, 2000, Byyny signed a revised version of the university apparel licensing policy recommended by the executive committee. The revisions were made in a closed door meeting, and public input was not sought on the changes. The revised version required licensees to comply with labor laws and regulations of their governments, and prohibited discrimination, harassment, child labor, forced labor and prison labor. WAAKE-UP! members were disappointed with vague language used in revision and weakened stance on women's rights and maximum hours allowed in a workweek.

May 4, 2000, in response to Byyny's rejection of the committee's licensing recommendations, WAAKE-UP! and Boulder Biotic Baking Brigade member, Sara Toombs (a.k.a. Agent Moon Pie), pied Chancellor Byyny while he was giving a speech on the CU-Boulder campus. Toombs was later tried for assault. Byyny claimed he incurred numerous dry cleaning bills and that his cheek was slightly bruised as a result of the pieing. Toombs testified at the trial that she baked the organic blueberry pie herself, and that she used her training in nonviolent resistance techniques as well as the benefit of practice with friends to "squoosh" the pie in Byyny's face without harming him. The jury found that she was not guilty of assault but did find her guilty of harassment and criminal mischief. Toombs was sentenced to six months of unsupervised probation, thirty hours of community service, and was ordered to write Byyny a letter of apology. The verdict was considered a victory by Toombs, her attorneys, and her supporters.

Before the trial WAAKE-UP! members staged a "sui-pied", a demonstration where they hit themselves in the face with pies to show how harmless it was, outside the Boulder County Justice Center.

=== September 2000 ===
September 18, 2000, the University of Colorado confirmed suspicions it had joined the Fair Labor Association on May 3, 2000. WAAKE-UP! members had only learned of the decision from a discussion with a FLA representative, and were upset that they were not consulted about or informed of the decision. Following the news, WAAKE-UP! members said they would continue the campaign making three demands on the university: (1) to adopt a strong licensing policy that will eliminate the possibility of doing business with companies that use sweatshop labor, (2) form an internal monitoring board within the University of Colorado that will evaluate whether companies comply with the licensing policy and to investigate and research possible violations, and (3) to join the Worker Rights Consortium (WRC) as an external monitoring agency that will investigate conditions in the factories in which apparel is made. Although it was not in the three demands, WAAKE-UP! also asked that the university relinquish its membership in the Fair Labor Association.

=== Continued organizing and victory ===
November 15, 2001 former WAAKE-UP! organizer Scott Silber returned to CU-Boulder to give a talk titled American Jihad Inc.: Corporate Crusades for the Free Market Faith about corporate influence in the post-September 11 world.

From 2004 to 2006 the student groups 180 degrees at the 11th hour, CASA (Coalition Against Sweatshop Apparel), and WWJC (World Workers Justice Committee) organized on the CU-Boulder campus, again trying to get the university to join the Worker Rights Consortium, this time petitioning Chancellor Phil Distefano.

May 5, 2005, the groups held a hunger strike inside Distefano's office, until it was announced that the university would begin the affiliation process. CASA members again went on hunger strike for fifteen days from April 12 to April 27, 2006, until the university accepted the Designated Supplier Program proposed by the United Students Against Sweatshops.

== Other causes and campaigns ==
=== Career fair demonstration ===
WAAKE-UP! members had requested a table at career fairs held on the CU-Boulder campus to inform students about the behavior of corporations trying to recruit them, but had been denied by CU-Boulder administration. In response, on January 31, 2000, WAAKE-UP! held a demonstration during a career fair, accompanied by TV Nation's Crackers the Corporate Crime-Fighting Chicken, carrying a banner that read "Students are NOT products, Teachers are NOT tools, The University is NOT a factory!"

=== Die-in to support the U'wa ===
March 14, 2000, WAAKE-UP! members staged a die-in in front of the World Trade Center buildings in Denver, Colorado to raise awareness about the U'wa's struggle against the Occidental Petroleum Corporation. There were approximate 20 police officers at the protest who dragged the limp protesters away from the scene, at one point dragging a protester's head into a street gutter. One of the protesters was taken in to custody without being read his Miranda Rights.

=== A16 solidarity march ===
On April 15, 2000, WAAKE-UP! organized a march of more than 400 people in Boulder in solidarity with protests of the World Bank and International Monetary Fund in Washington D.C. The protests were a continuation of those at the Ministerial Conference of 1999 in Seattle, Washington. On April 9, 2000, The Daily Camera published an article by Ira Chernus in support of the march supporting the protest. Speakers at the protest included Cecilia Zarate-Laun and David Pellow. The protest was non-violent and there was no hostile contact with the police during it.

Some WAAKE-UP! members, however, went to the April 16 protest in Washington D.C., and came prepared to treat protesters who might be injured. They brought medical supplies and treated people who had been pepper sprayed.

=== Flatirons Crossing protest ===
August 11, 2000, WAAKE-UP! members protested the opening of the Flatirons Crossing mall in Broomfield, Colorado. WAAKE-UP! believed the mall promoted consumerism and contributed to urban sprawl.

=== S26 Solidarity March ===
September 25, 2000, WAAKE-UP! members and other activists marched on Pearl Street Mall in Boulder, Colorado. The action was in solidarity with protests against the International Monetary Fund and World Bank in Prague. Protesters urged passersby at stores on the Pearl Street Mall such as GAP, Banana Republic, Abercrombie & Fitch, Starbucks, and Borders (under construction at the time) to support local business, chanting "Take your crap back to the Gap" and "Human need, not corporate greed." This was a smaller protest compared to one following it in Denver, Colorado on September 26, 2000.

=== Buy Nothing Day ===
November 23, 2001, WAAKE-UP! members supported the Buy Nothing Day protests in Boulder, Colorado, organized by CU-Boulder professor Kayann Short, who focused it on how consumerism affects women.

=== The People's Summit on Globalization ===
WAAKE-UP! supported the People's Summit on Globalization, a conference discussing how globalization affects people around the world. The conference focused specifically on institutions such as the World Bank, International Monetary Fund, and the World Trade Organization. The conference was held March 8–11, 2001, and featured speakers such as Paul Hawken, Chol Soon Rhie, Danny Kennedy, Kevin Danaher, Ignacio Ibarra, Njoki Njoroge Njehu, Raquel Sancho, Amy Goodman, Julie Davids, Carlos Zorrilla, Michael Morrill, Orrin Williams, Ward Churchill, Evelyn Hu-DeHart, Irungu Houghton, Jason Wallach, and William Begay.

=== The Rocky Mountain Rebels ===
The Rocky Mountain Rebels were a group of Radical Cheerleaders in WAAKE-UP!. They were present at nearly every WAAKE-UP! demonstration cheering on the protesters.

=== Radical Rush ===
As an alternative to fraternity and sorority rushes, WAAKE-UP! members held a "Radical Rush" at the beginning of each semester in an attempt to get incoming students acquainted with all of the radical student organizations on campus. The Radical Rush tradition continued after WAAKE-UP! was defunct.

=== This Is What Democracy Looks Like ===
November 30, 2000, WAAKE-UP! co-sponsored showings of the film This Is What Democracy Looks Like along with End Sanctions Now!, the Rocky Mountain Independent Media Center, AMP, Art & Revolution, Free Speech TV and KGNU.

=== Unity 2000 ===
WAAKE-UP! endorsed Unity 2000, a group of concerned citizens and activists who protested at the Republican National Convention in Philadelphia, Pennsylvania on July 30, 2000.

== Presence in the Denver Police spy files ==
The Colorado ACLU was able to obtain files collected by the FBI's Joint Terrorism Task Force while working with local law enforcement in Denver, Colorado as a result of the Denver Police Spy File litigation. The files show that emails were intercepted from WAAKE-UP!'s email list, specifically about a protest planned for the Aspen Institutes's Summit on Globalization and the Human Condition in July 2000. Tim DeLaria of the CU-Boulder police department intercepted the email and forwarded it to George Kennedy in the Denver Police Department's Intelligence Unit. Kennedy wrote back to Tim DeLaria saying he would forward the email to Tom Fisher of the FBI Joint Terrorism Task Force to contact someone in Aspen, Colorado.

In addition to the exchange about The Aspen Institute's Summit on Globalization, it also includes an exchange between Tim DeLaria and the Denver Police Department about a march organized by WAAKE-UP! in support of the U'wa. The WAAKE-UP! email list was one of 24 lists mentioned in a FOIA request by the Colorado ACLU in relation to the Denver Police Spy files case.

== Criticism ==
Linda Gorman of the Independence Institute wrote two articles decrying WAAKE-UP!. Gorman claimed that policies advocated by WAAKE-UP! would put the working poor making University of Colorado apparel out of work. Gorman was also very critical of Sara Toombs' choice of fillings for the pie baked to pie Chancellor Byyny; stating that at the time of year when the pie was baked blueberries were out of season and may have been imported by a corporation exploiting its workers south of the United States border. Gorman suggested Toombs should have made a rhubarb pie, as rhubarb was in season at the time.
