= Bob Johnson (comedian) =

Ghanaian comedian (1904–1985)

Bob Johnson (born Ishmael Johnson; 1904–1985), also known as The Original Bob, was a Ghanaian comedian who started the one-man show to concert party.

== Background ==
Johnson and Bob Cole begun the concert party tradition in Ghana.

Johnson formed Versatile Eight, which consisted of three principal characters: the joker, the gentleman and lady impersonator. The group first performed in Sekondi Methodist School with Johnson playing the joker. The audience at the Optimism club nicknamed him Bob. Johnson performed a combination of Western blackface minstrels and the trickster Ananse, a hero of Akan folklore.

Johnson took his show to villages throughout Ghana. The show was usually performed in English but was occasionally translated into Akan.

In 1935, Johnson became the "joker" for the Axim Trio while E.K Dadson played ‘Susanna’ and Charlie Turpin, the ‘gentleman’.
