= Tons of Fun =

Tons of Fun may refer to:

- Ton of Fun, a silent film comedy team
- "Tons of Fun" (Pee-wee's Playhouse), an episode of Pee-wee's Playhouse

== See also ==
- Two Tons O' Fun, an alternate name for the pop act The Weather Girls
