= Ton of Fun =

Comedy team

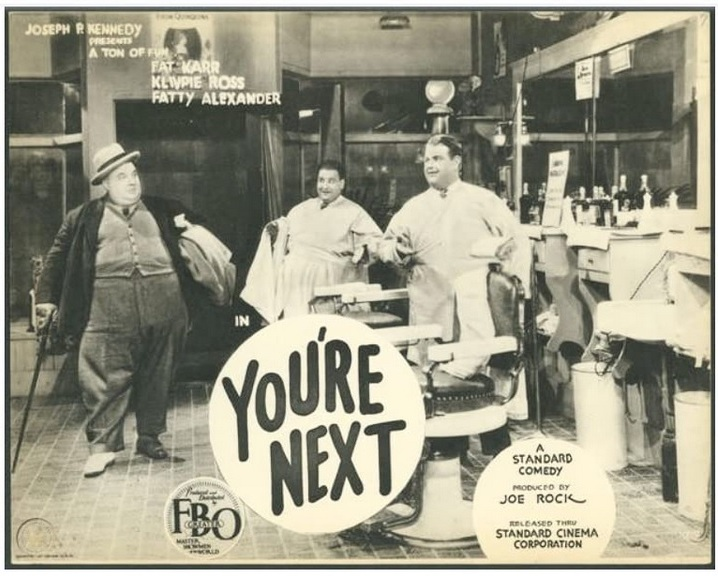
Karr, Ross, and Alexander in "You're Next", 1927.

A Ton Of Fun (also called Tons Of Fun) was a comedy team who appeared in a series of slapstick silent short films for FBO from 1925 to 1927. The three heavy actors Frank "Fatty" Alexander, Hilliard "Fat" Karr, and Kewpie Ross were each over 300 pounds. Karr was also billed as Fatty Karr. Their first film together was Tailoring in 1925. The last "A Ton Of Fun" film was A Joyful Day in 1928. Ross retired from films after their last film, while Alexander went to work for Hal Roach Studios and Karr appeared in four more films for FBO and RKO.

Excerpts from the movies were shown on Howdy Doody in the early 1950s, credited as "The Tons of Fun," with the characters named Vic, Clint, and Bullet (also named Buffalo Vic, Buffalo Clint, and Buffalo Bullet) by Bob Smith, who narrated the movie excerpts during the show.

== Films ==
- Tailoring (1925)
- Three Wise Goofs (1925)
- On The Links (1925)
- All Tied Up (1925) (directed by Slim Summerville)
- All Out (1925) (directed by Slim Summerville)
- In The Air (1926) (directed by Slim Summerville)
- Heavy Love (1926)
- A Beauty Parlor (1926)
- Honeymoon Feet (1926)
- The Heavy Parade (1926)
- Three Of A Kind (1926)
- Wedding Daze (1926)
- Back Fire (1926)
- Galloping Ghosts (1926)
- Heavy Fullbacks (1926)
- The Vulgar Yachtman (1926)
- Heavyation (1926)
- Three Glad Men (1927)
- The Unsocial Three (1927)
- Old Tin Sides (1927)
- Three Fleshy Devils (1927)
- Three Missing Links (1927)
- You're Next (1927)
- Panting Papas (1928)
- Tanks Of The Wabash (1927)
- Wanderers Of The Waistline (1927)
- Campus Romeos (1927)
- How High Is Up? (1927)
- What Price Dough (1927)
- Heavy Hikers (1927)
- You're Next (1927)
- Oui, Oui, Heidelberg (1928)
- The Happy Trio (1928)
- All Alike (1928)
- Big Berthas (1928)
- Heavy Infants (1928)
- Standing Pat (1928)
- A Joyful Day (1928)

== See also ==
- List of slapstick comedy topics
