= Slapstick =

Style of comedy

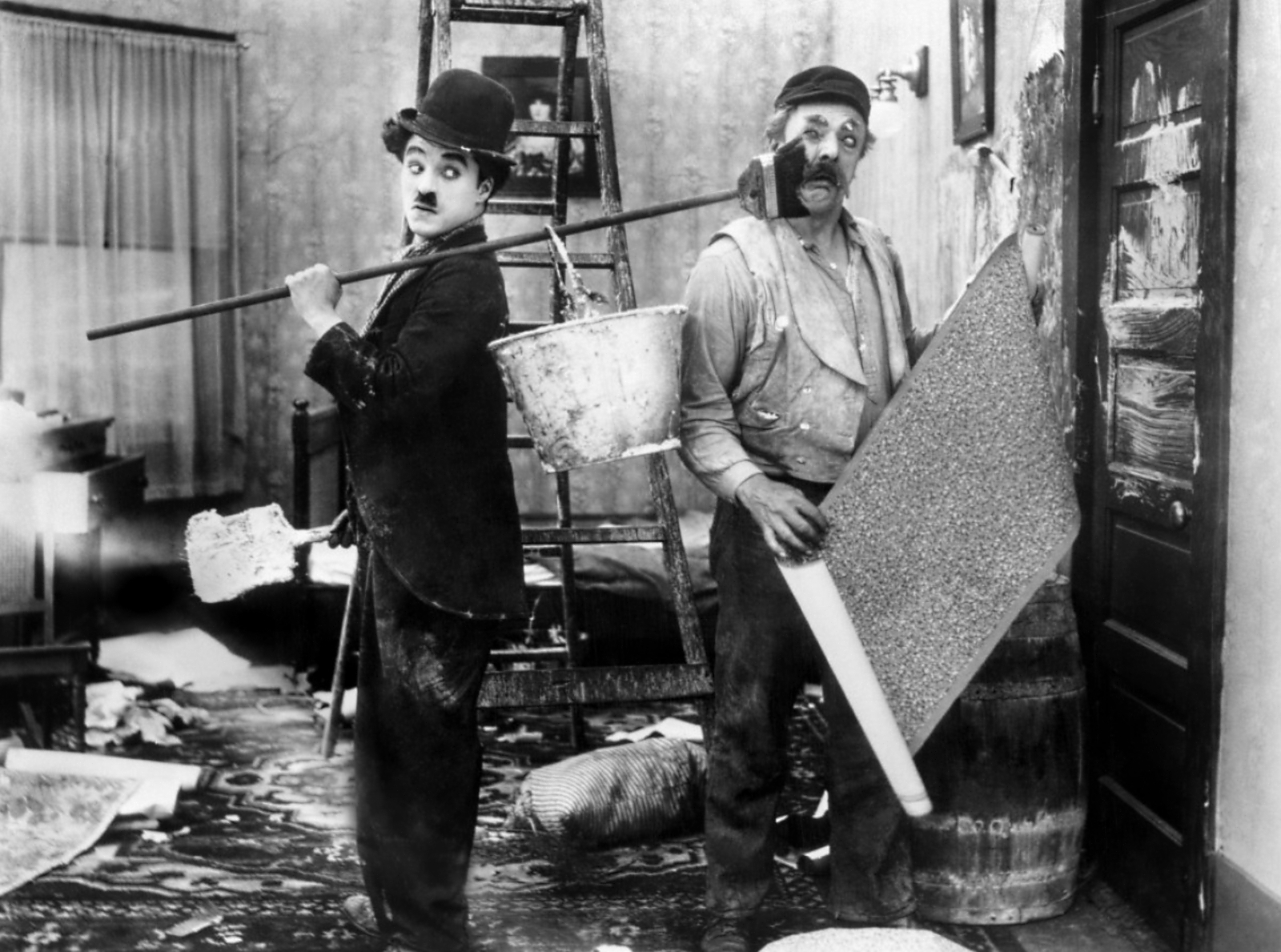
A slapstick scene from the 1915 Charlie Chaplin film His New Job. Chaplin started his film career as a physical comedian, and his later work continued to contain elements of slapstick.

Slapstick is a style of humor involving exaggerated physical activity that exceeds the boundaries of normal physical comedy, which may involve both intentional violence and violence by mishap, often resulting from physical abuse or inept use of props.

The term arises from a device developed for use in the broad, physical comedy style known as commedia dell'arte in 16th-century Italy. The "slap stick" consists of two thin slats of wood, which makes a "slap" when striking another actor, with little force needed to make a loud—and comical—sound. The physical slap stick remains a key component of the plot in the traditional and popular Punch and Judy puppet show. More contemporary examples of slapstick humor include The Three Stooges, The Naked Gun and Mr. Bean.

== Origins ==
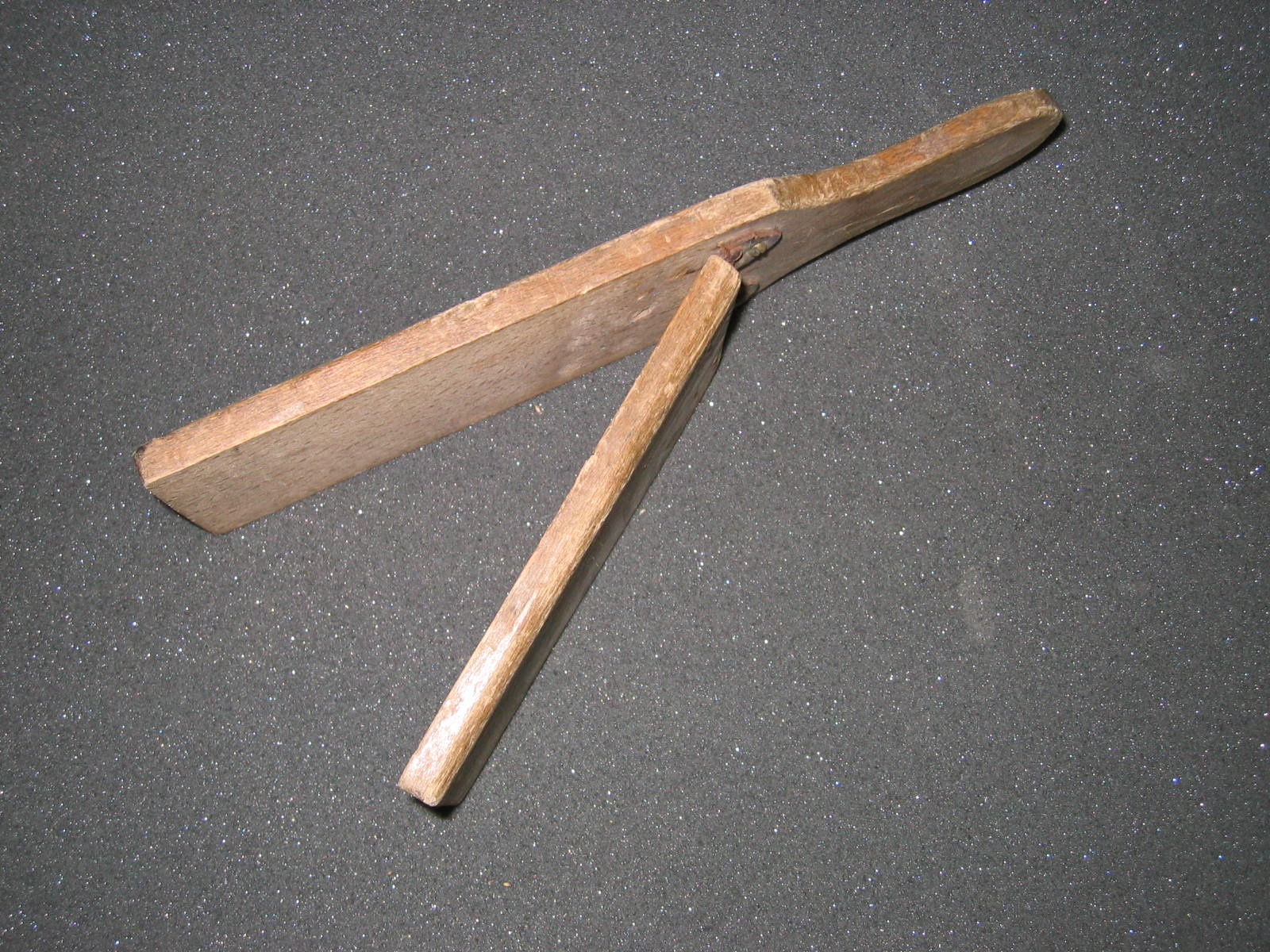
A slap stick

The name "slapstick" originates from the Italian batacchio or bataccio—called the "slap stick" in English—a club-like object composed of two wooden slats used in commedia dell'arte. When struck, the Batacchio produces a loud smacking noise, though it is only a little force that is transferred from the object to the person being struck. Actors may thus hit one another repeatedly with great audible effect while causing no damage and only very minor, if any, pain. Along with the inflatable bladder (of which the whoopee cushion is a modern variant), it was among the earliest special effects.

== Early uses ==
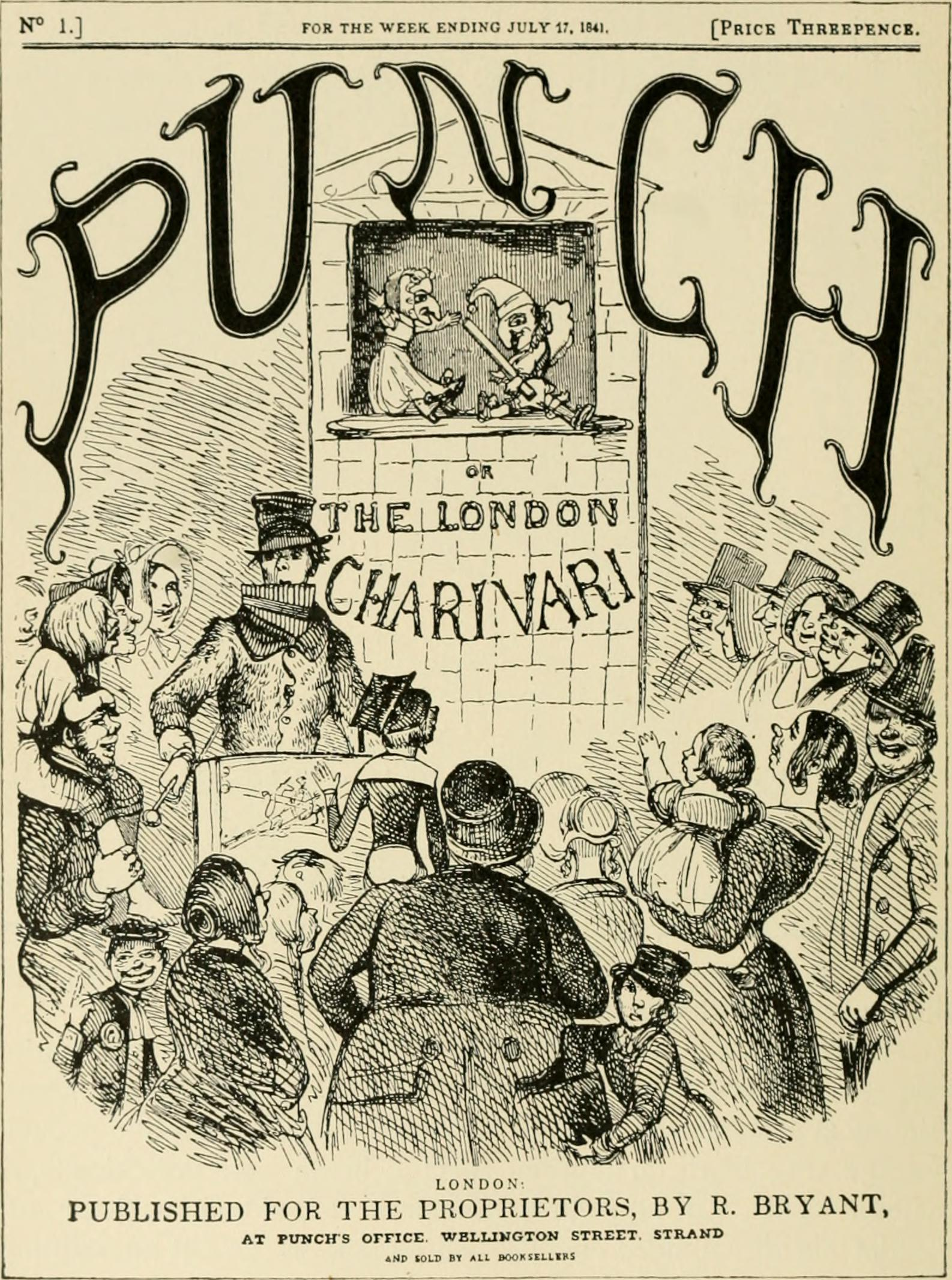
1841 advertisement for Punch and Judy showing Punch with his slapstick

Slapstick comedy's history is measured in centuries. Shakespeare incorporated many chase scenes and beatings into his comedies, such as in his play The Comedy of Errors. In early 19th-century England, pantomime acquired its present form which includes slapstick comedy: its most famous performer, Joseph Grimaldi—the father of modern clowning—"was a master of physical comedy". Comedy routines also featured heavily in British music hall theatre which became popular in the 1850s.

In Punch and Judy shows, which first appeared in England on 9 May 1662, a large slapstick is wielded by Punch against the other characters.

== Fred Karno and music hall ==
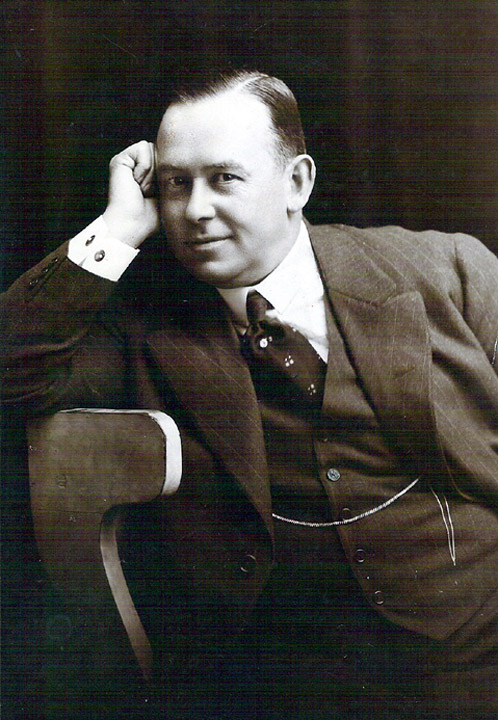
Fred Karno, music hall impresario and pioneer of slapstick comedy

British comedians who honed their skills at pantomime and music hall sketches include Charlie Chaplin, Stan Laurel, George Formby and Dan Leno. The English music hall comedian and theatre impresario Fred Karno developed a form of sketch comedy without dialogue in the 1890s, and Chaplin and Laurel were among the young comedians who worked for him as part of "Fred Karno's London Comedians". Chaplin's fifteen-year music hall career inspired the comedy in all his later film work, especially as pantomimicry. In 1904, Karno's Komics produced a new sketch for the Hackney Empire in London called Mumming Birds, which included the "pie in the face" gag, in which one person hits another with a pie, among other new innovations. Immensely popular, it became the longest-running sketch the music halls produced. Chaplin and Laurel were among the music hall comedians who partook in the sketch, while Charlie's older brother Sydney was the first of the brothers to perform it for Karno.

In a biography of Karno, Laurel stated: "Fred Karno didn't teach Charlie [Chaplin] and me all we know about comedy. He just taught us most of it". American film producer Hal Roach described Karno as "not only a genius, he is the man who originated slapstick comedy. We in Hollywood owe much to him."

== In film and television ==
Building on its later popularity in the 19th and early 20th-century routines of music hall in Britain and the American vaudeville house, the style was explored extensively during the "golden era" of black and white movies directed by Hal Roach and Mack Sennett that featured such notables as Charlie Chaplin, Mabel Normand, Abbott and Costello, Laurel and Hardy, the Three Stooges, and Larry Semon. The pie in the face gag was used extensively in this era. Chaplin's 1915 film A Night in the Show, which includes the pie in the face gag, brings one of the classic music hall comedy sketches, Mumming Birds, known as A Night in an English Music Hall when Chaplin performed it on tour, into his film work. Silent slapstick comedy was also popular in early French films and included films by Max Linder, Charles Prince, and Sarah Duhamel.

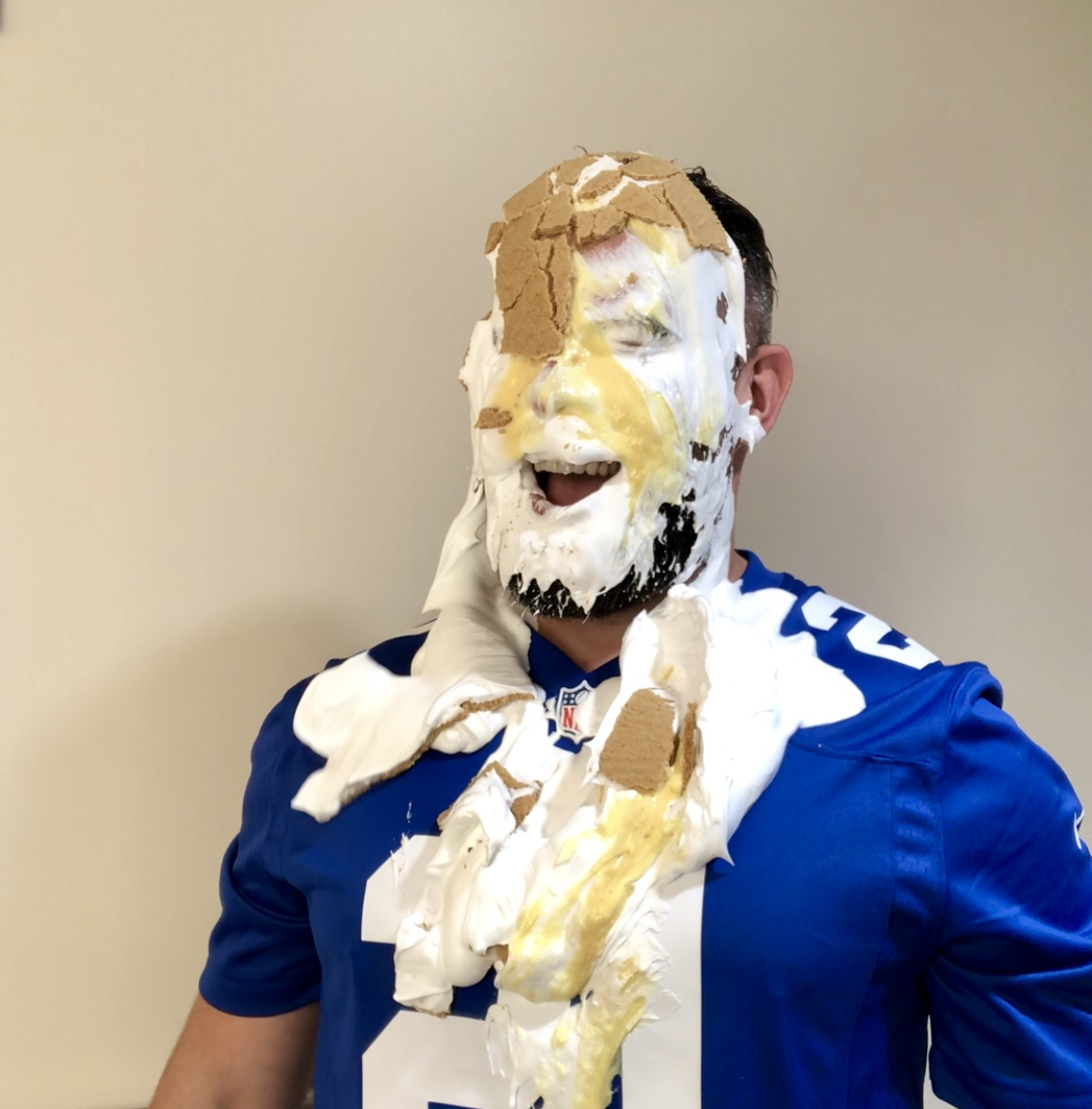
The "pie in the face" is a staple of slapstick comedy.

Slapstick also became a common element in animated cartoons starting in the 1930s and 1940s; examples include Disney's Mickey Mouse and Donald Duck shorts, Walter Lantz's Woody Woodpecker, the Beary Family, MGM's Tom and Jerry, the unrelated Tom and Jerry cartoons of Van Beuren Studios, Warner Bros. Looney Tunes/Merrie Melodies, MGM's Barney Bear, and Tex Avery's Screwy Squirrel. Slapstick was later used in Japanese Tokusatsu TV Kamen Rider Den O, Kamen Rider Gaim, Kamen Rider Drive, by Benny Hill in The Benny Hill Show in the UK, and in the US used in the three 1960s TV series, Gilligan's Island, Batman, The Flying Nun and I Love Lucy. Hill, whose comedy sketches first appeared on British television in the early 1950s, was described by writer Anthony Burgess as "a comic genius steeped in the British music hall tradition". In the 1970s, the sitcom Three's Company featured slapstick infused scenes in most episodes. In 1990, Mr. Bean, starring Rowan Atkinson, debuted on British television, and, like Benny Hill, cartoons and other comedians whose "visual humour transcended language barriers" (description of Hill by the BFI), the show would be exported around the world.

A man using a newspaper as improvised clothing in a slapstick-style visual gag involving accidental loss of clothing

== 20th century fad ==
Examples of the use of the slapstick in public places as a fad in the early 20th century include:

During the 1911 Veiled Prophet Parade in St. Louis, according to the St. Louis Post-Dispatch,

The slapstick, so long indispensable to low comedy, found a new use among the crowds ... they used the slapstick to the extreme embarrassment of many women. The carnival spirit, for the most part tempered by high good humor, at times verged on rowdyism. Girls used a stick ripped with feathers to tickle the faces of young men, and they retaliated vigorously with the slapstick.

An editorial in the Asbury Park Press, New Jersey, said in 1914:

Slapsticks are the latest "fun-making" fad for masque fetes ... Orders to stop the slapstick nuisance should be issued by the police and the Asbury Park carnival commissioners. Any device that cannot be operated or used without inflicting unmerited pain and injury should be excluded ...

== See also ==
- Comedy
- Slapstick Festival
- List of slapstick comedy topics
- Slapstick film
- Cartoon violence
- Stage combat
- Schadenfreude
