= Pieing =

Throwing a pie at a person or people

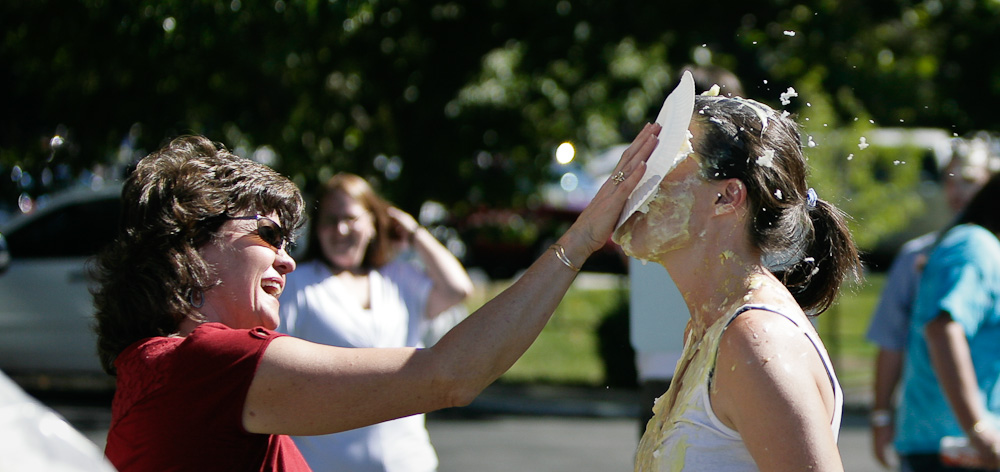
Someone smashing a cream pie in a young woman’s face

Pieing is the act of throwing a pie at a person. In Britain, a pie in the context of throwing is traditionally referred to as a custard pie. An aluminium pie pan or paper plate filled with whipped cream or more typically, shaving cream can substitute for a real pie, but bakery pies such as chocolate cream pie, banana cream pie, coconut cream pie, or lemon meringue pie are also used, especially when one desires a more messy and humiliating effect. Brought to a widespread audience as the "pie-in-face" gag in silent film comedies, pieing may sometimes be intended as a harmless practical joke. However, it can also be used as a means of political protest directed against an authority figure, politician, industrialist, or celebrity, and perpetrators may regard the act as a form of ridicule.

Non-consensual pieing can constitute a punishable offence in criminal law (see, battery). Non-consensual pieing may also be actionable as a civil wrong (tort) giving the victim of the pieing the right to recover damages in a lawsuit.

Pieing and pie fights are a staple of slapstick comedy, and consensual pie "tosses" are also common charity fundraising events, especially in schools.

== Slapstick ==
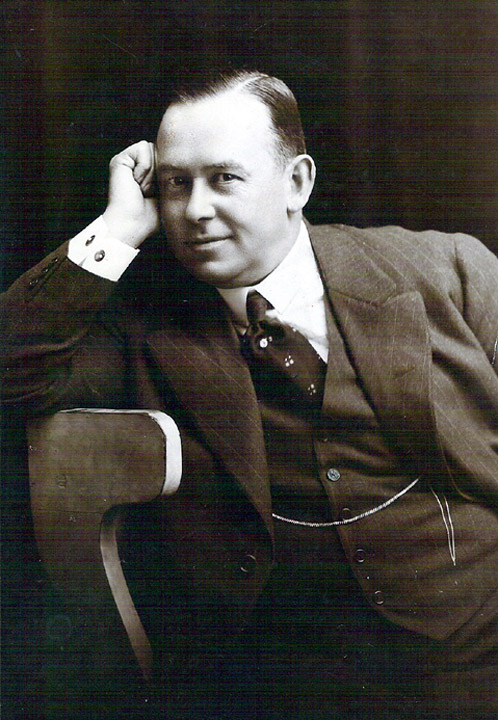
In Fred Karno's Mumming Birds sketch (1904), a pie in the face appears in the 'Frivolity music hall scene'.

Pieing has its origins in the "pie in the face" gag from slapstick comedy. It made its first appearance in a music hall sketch called Mumming Birds (1904) produced by the English theatre impresario Fred Karno for the Hackney Empire in London. Immensely popular, it became the longest-running sketch the music halls produced. Charlie Chaplin and Stan Laurel, both employed by Karno, were among the music hall comedians who partook in the sketch, while Charlie's older brother Sydney was the first of the brothers to perform it for Karno.

It was first seen in film in the 1909 Essanay Studios silent film Mr. Flip starring Ben Turpin. In the story, Turpin has a pie pushed into his face for taking liberties with the woman behind the pie store counter. Beginning in 1913 with That Ragtime Band and A Noise from the Deep, filmmaker Mack Sennett became known for using one or two thrown pies in many of his comedy shorts. Sennett had a personal rule about who received the pies: "A mother never gets hit with a custard pie ... Mothers-in-law, yes. But mothers? Never."

In 1915, Chaplin's film A Night in the Show, which includes the pie in the face gag, brings one of the classic music hall comedy sketches, Mumming Birds, known as A Night in an English Music Hall when Chaplin performed it on tour, into his film work. At least a half dozen films have been made incorporating extended pie-throwing battles. The first was Chaplin's Behind the Screen released in 1916. The definitive pie fight in film occurs in The Battle of the Century (1927) starring Stan Laurel and Oliver Hardy, using 3,000 pies. Our Gang's Shivering Shakespeare (1930) winds up with an auditorium full of people throwing pies. The 1935 short subject Keystone Hotel featured a large pie-fight ending with the camera taking a pie. Another major pie-fight, their first, appeared in The Three Stooges' In the Sweet Pie and Pie (1941). Pieing had become such an established gag in Hollywood comedy that the song "Make 'Em Laugh" from Singin' In The Rain (1952) concludes with the line "And then you get a great big custard pie in the face!", the movie itself involves a pieing scene. A film involving pies was the comedy The Great Race (1965), known for having the largest pie fight in cinematic history. Its $200,000 pie-fight scene used 4,000 pies and one large cake, and took five days to shoot. Pie fights also featured in Beach Party (1963), Smashing Time (1967) and Blazing Saddles (1974). In Bugsy Malone (1976), the "splurge guns" resembled spud guns which fired custard. Original plans called for Dr. Strangelove (1964) to end with a pie fight; the scene, though filmed, was ultimately deemed excessively farcical by director Stanley Kubrick and removed from the final cut. Surviving stills from the excised pie fight have appeared online.

There are many instances in the Looney Tunes series of cartoons where characters pie each other in the face. Bugs Bunny repeatedly hits Elmer Fudd with cream pies during a scene in Slick Hare (1947), and also shoves one in Elmer's face in Hare Do. In Shishkabugs (1962), Bugs Bunny releases a spring-loaded pie into the face of the king, causing the royal cook Yosemite Sam to be led away to a dungeon. Daffy Dilly (1948) has Daffy Duck trying to cure a dying millionaire by getting him to laugh. After he achieves this inadvertently, by landing in a cake, Daffy is hired as a sort of household jester and ends the cartoon by getting repeatedly pelted with cakes and pies. Bugs himself gets pied in Case of the Missing Hare, provoking him to spend the rest of the short wreaking revenge.

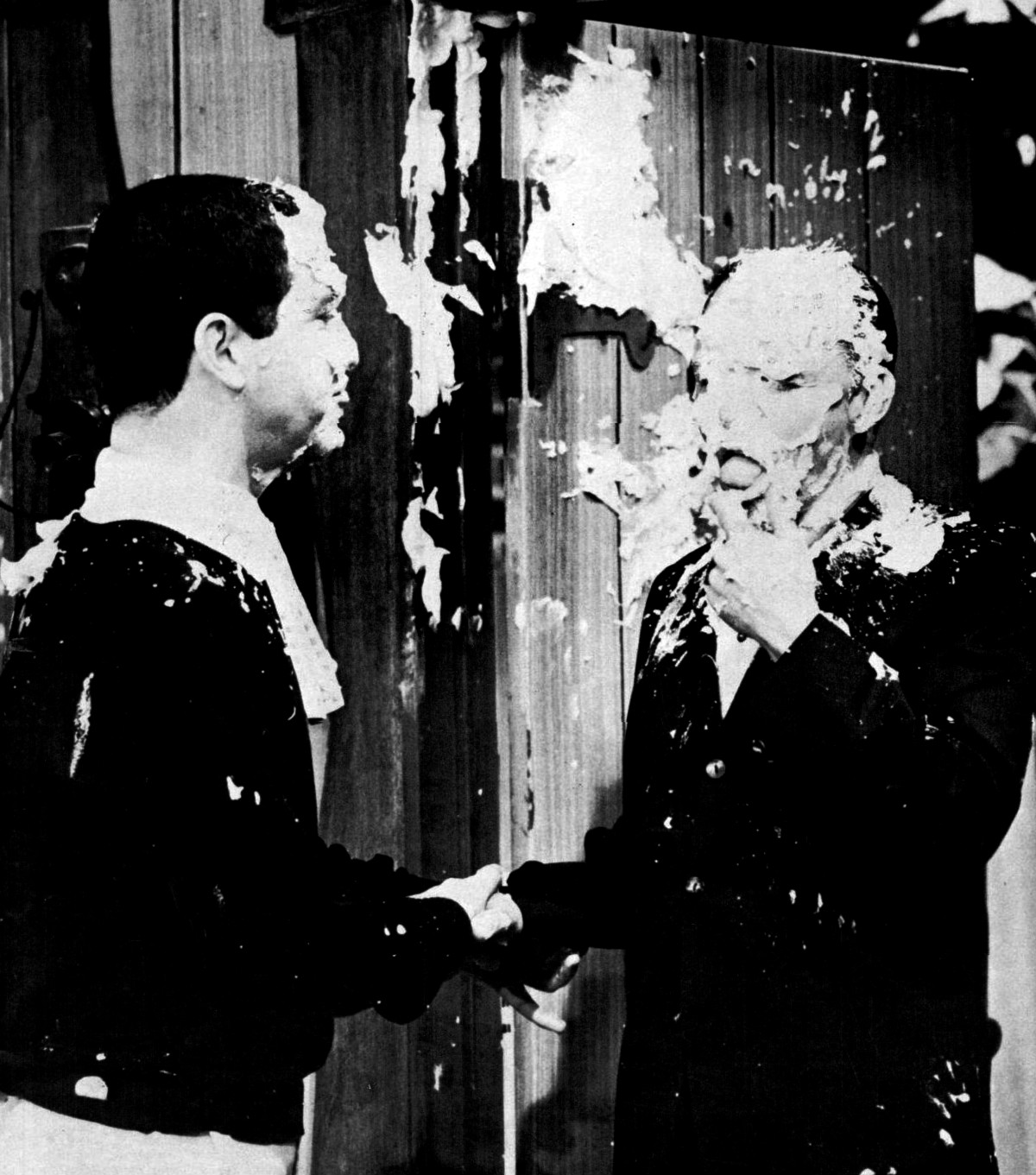
Frank Sinatra and Soupy Sales covered in pie

Many comedy routines have used a pie as a gag, including ones performed by Soupy Sales and Monty Python, and those of clowns in many circus performances.

A popular Nickelodeon reality show called What Would You Do? also features contraptions designed to hit participants in the face with multiple cream pies, often as punishment for losing, or sometimes as a reward for winning, a game performed on the show. The UK Saturday morning programme Tiswas had custard pies as a regular feature and even had a character called The Phantom Flan Flinger, a masked man who pied people.

The World Custard Pie Throwing Championships take place annually in the village of Coxheath in Kent, England.

== Political acts ==
The probable originator of pieing as a political act in the United States was Jim Retherford, former underground newspaper editor and ghost writer of Jerry Rubin's Do It!, who landed a cream pie in the face of former UC Berkeley president Clark Kerr in Bloomington, Indiana, October 14, 1969. Retherford's theatrics were widely reported in the U.S. and European press. The next pie was thrown by Tom Forcade, the founder of High Times magazine. In 1970, Forcade pied Otto N. Larsen, the Chairman of the President's Commission on Obscenity and Pornography. Aron Kay, also a Yippie, went on to take up Forcade's pieing tactics. Kay pied, among many others, William F. Buckley Jr., Phyllis Schlafly, G. Gordon Liddy, E. Howard Hunt, and Andy Warhol. A disciple of Aron Kay, Thom Higgins pied singer and anti gay-rights activist Anita Bryant in Des Moines, Iowa, in 1977 (audio footage of the incident is included in the Chumbawamba song "Just Desserts", an homage to the concept of pieing). Kay retired in 1992 after pieing right-wing activist Randall Terry. Kay appears in cartoon form in a 2003 animated music video, "Death penalty for pot" by Benedict Arnold and The Traitors, where he and Dana Beal pied George W. Bush and former U.S. Attorney General John Ashcroft (at 2 minutes and 33 seconds into the video).

Concerning Kay, an article in the San Francisco Examiner says: "He considers the Three Stooges, whom he began watching on TV as a kid, as the true fathers of pie-throwing."

Inspired by Kay, pro-choice activists pied British far-right Christian activist Mary Whitehouse in Brisbane during a 1978 speaking tour of Australia.

A noted victim of pieing was Microsoft founder Bill Gates who was pied in Belgium in 1998 by serial anarchist entarteur Noël Godin. A computer game was later released in which Gates' head pops up around the screen and the object is to "pie" as many of his heads as possible in the allocated time. Other victims include designer Karl Lagerfeld, American singer Kenny Rogers, former Dutch finance minister Gerrit Zalm and media tycoon Rupert Murdoch.

The anonymous Biotic Baking Brigade has pied or attempted to pie, among others, conservative pundits Ann Coulter and David Horowitz; and Fred Phelps, the controversial leader of the Westboro Baptist Church. Coulter has also been attacked by the "terrorist" group Al Pieda. The Canadian group the Entartistes, founded by Rhinoceros Party of Canada founder François Gourd, has also pied many, including then-Prime Minister of Canada Jean Chrétien. In 2003, in the city of Calgary, they pied Ralph Klein, the premier of the Canadian province of Alberta; they stated in their press release: "Is it surprising to see Ralph Klein opposing the Kyoto Accord for the right of big corporations to pollute, the same corporations that finance his campaigns?"

In 2001, environmentalist Mark Lynas pied Bjørn Lomborg at a book event due to his disagreement with the arguments he put forward in The Skeptical Environmentalist.

"The pie gives power back to the people because so many feel powerless in the face of big politicians and industrialists", explained Pope-Tart (a pseudonym), a member of the Entartistes. Newsweek columnist Gersh Kuntzman wrote that pieing "deserves to be one of the most celebrated traditions in our so-called culture."

Sometimes pieing targets suffer the prank with good humor. Jean-Luc Godard was very pleased at being pied and said "this is what happens when silent movies meet talking pictures"; he intervened with the Cannes authorities on behalf of Noël Godin to prevent him from being arrested. Anti-gay campaigner Anita Bryant, upon being pied by a gay activist on television, joked that "at least it's a fruit pie", apparently making a pun on the derogatory term for a gay man ("fruit"). However, moments later she was in tears. By contrast, Bernard-Henri Lévy has on multiple occasions attacked Godin and his followers, and Ann Coulter pressed charges in 2005 when she narrowly evaded a pie at the University of Arizona. Activist David Horowitz said of his pieing, "These attacks are sinister. The person who throws a pie is saying, ‘I hate you. I don't want you to speak.' I never saw it coming. And it took away my dignity. When you're lecturing, you're supposed to have an authority. But a pie turns it into a food fight."

On January 25, 2010, Canada's Fisheries and Oceans Minister Gail Shea was hit with a pie in her face while touring the Canada Centre for Inland Waters in Burlington, Ontario, in an act of protest against the seal hunt in Canada by animal rights group PETA. PETA said in a release that it was part of its campaign "to stop the government's ill-advised sanction of the slaughter of seals."

On 19 July 2011, Rupert Murdoch was pied in London during a Parliamentary hearing on the News International phone hacking scandal.

On 9 May 2017, Alan Joyce, the chief executive of Australian airline Qantas, had a speech interrupted by a man who shoved a pie in his face.

According to US president Donald Trump's former fixer Michael Cohen, his boss often referred to the Bill Gates incident and instructed his security detail to look out for flying pies. Trump has also expressed a disdain for fruit-based projectiles, stating under oath that "you can be killed if that happens.”

=== Convicted ===
==== Canada ====
Canadian prime minister Jean Chrétien was hit in the face with a pie by a protester in Prince Edward Island in 2000. His attacker initially was given a prison sentence, but subsequently received a conditional sentence.

A woman who missed Alberta Premier Ed Stelmach with a pie at the annual Calgary Stampede breakfast in 2007, and hit a security official instead, was sentenced to 30 days in prison. So was a woman who threw a pie at Calgary Mayor Dave Bronconnier in the summer of 2007.

In 2003, a protester who hit then-Alberta premier Ralph Klein in the face with a pie at the Stampede breakfast was convicted of assault and ordered to serve a 30-day intermittent prison sentence.

In 2010, a PETA supporter threw a tofu cream pie at Canadian fisheries minister Gail Shea to protest the Canadian Government's support of seal hunting. The act was later condemned by Liberal MP Gerry Byrne as an act of terrorism.

==== Spain ====
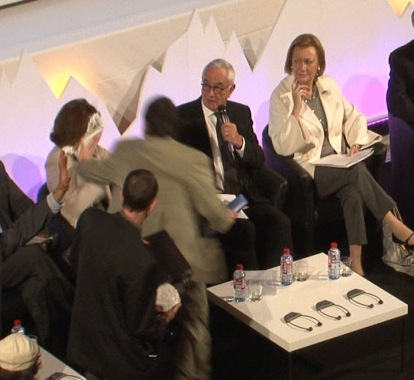
Pie smash to Yolanda Barcina in Toulouse

On 27 October 2011, the Spanish politician Yolanda Barcina was hit by three pies during a meeting in Toulouse, France. The pies were thrown by Gorka Ovejero Bengoa, Deputy Mayor of Arruazu at the time, Julio Martín Villanueva and Ibon García Garrido, protesting against a high-speed rail line. On 27 November 2013, a Spanish court condemned all three to a fine of €900 (equivalent to €1,115 in 2023) and two years in prison each. An accomplice who did not throw a pie was condemned to one year in prison. Yolanda Barcina claimed bodily harm, suffered because of "the hardness of French meringue pie".

==== Sweden ====
In September 2001, the Swedish king Carl XVI Gustaf was visiting Varberg when a 16-year-old boy threw a strawberry tart at him. Such an attack could possibly have counted as high treason under Swedish law, which would have warranted a long prison sentence. However, the perpetrator was only convicted of assault, as it could not be proven that his action was politically motivated. He was later ordered to pay day-fines. Two other boys, who had helped to prepare the attack by making the tart, were also fined.

On November 5, 2013, the Sweden Democrats leader Jimmie Åkesson had a cake thrown at him. The perpetrator was sentenced to 2 months in jail and fined 5,000 kr (equivalent to SEK 6,428 in 2023) for the crime of harassment.

==== United Kingdom ====
Comedian Jonathan May-Bowles (also known as Jonny Marbles) pied Rupert Murdoch in July 2011 during a highly publicized testimony before a British parliamentary committee in connection with the News International phone hacking scandal. May-Bowles was sentenced to serve a six-week prison sentence at Wandsworth Prison in London; this sentence was later reduced to four weeks.

==== United States ====
Thomas Lawrence Higgins, an American writer and gay rights activist credited with coining the term gay pride, is best known for pushing a pie into the face of anti-gay activist Anita Bryant on live television in 1977.

In August 2010, a Michigan State University student named Ahlam Mohsem, 23, threw a Dutch apple pie into Michigan Senator Carl Levin's face and was arrested on assault and battery charges. The police also charged a man who allegedly distracted the senator before the pie was thrown. Mohsem said she threw the pie with the aim of "bringing to light Sen. Levin's war crimes" as a "Zionist".

In September 2016, Sacramento, California, mayor Kevin Johnson was attending a charity event at Sacramento Charter High School when a man approached him and hit him in the face with a cream pie. Johnson then punched his assailant. The perpetrator, Sean Thompson, was arrested on a felony charge of assaulting a public official and misdemeanor charge of battery on school.

== Charity ==
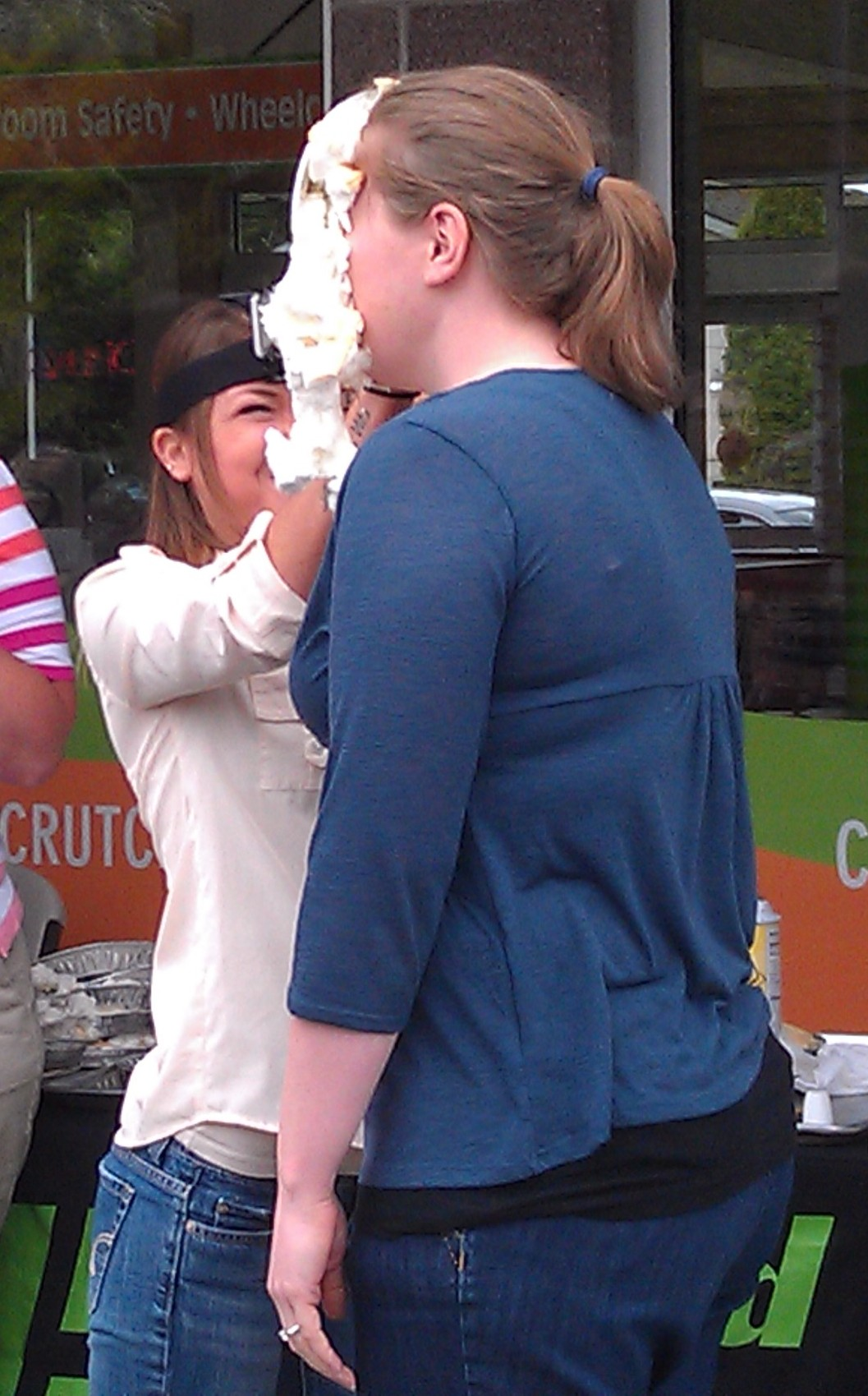
A person gets "pied" in a charity fundraiser for ALS research.

Pie-in-the-face variants on the Ice Bucket Challenge also emerged in 2014, most commonly under the name "Pie In The Eye Challenge", in which the nominated person must receive a pie in the face instead of the bucket of iced water poured over the head.

In some cases, individuals underwent both challenges in the same video. One particular occurrence of this, the late 2016 Waitress Pie Challenge, was initiated by the cast of the musical Waitress to raise awareness of breast cancer.

== Sports ==
=== Baseball ===
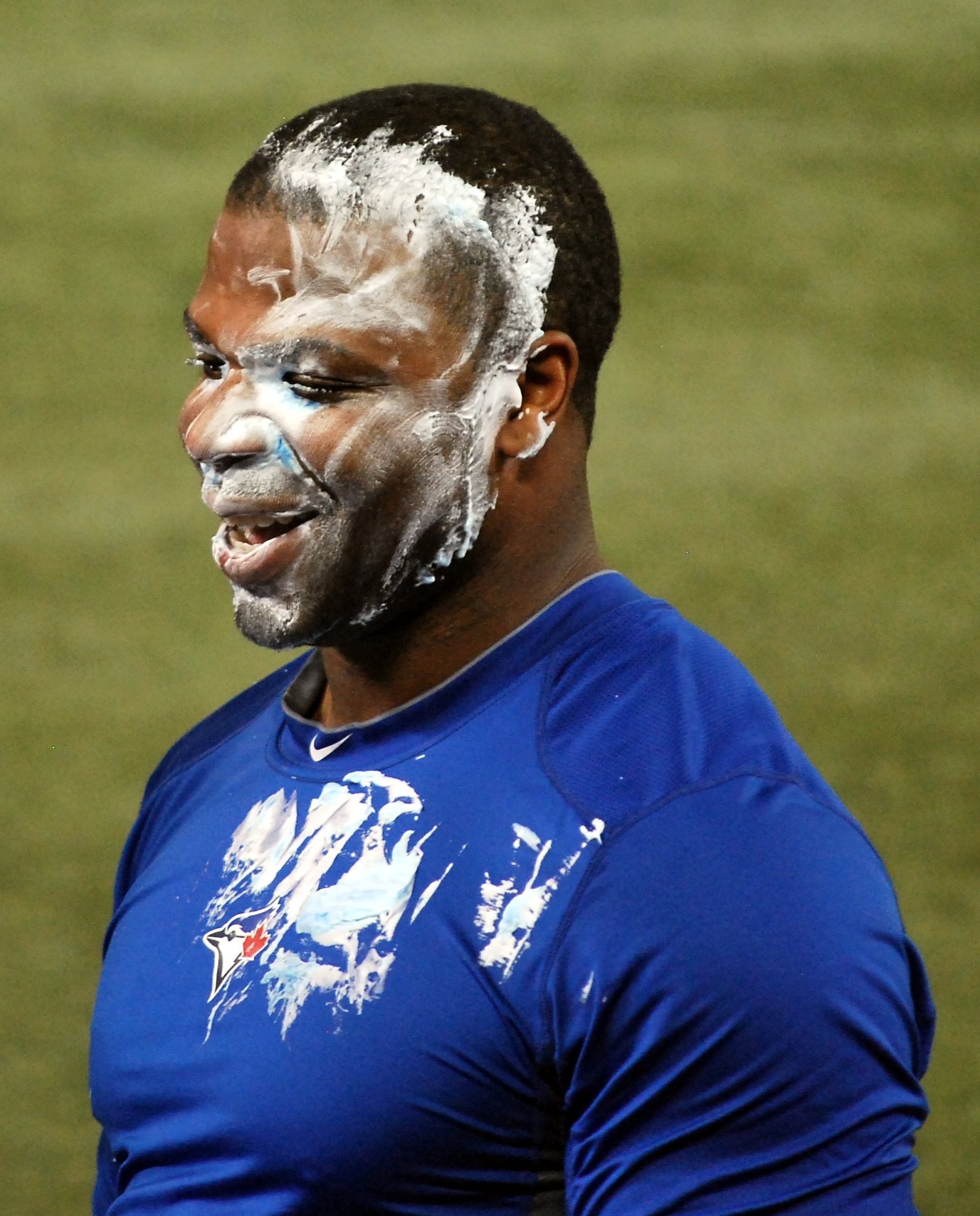
Rajai Davis of the Toronto Blue Jays after having been pied in 2013

In Major League Baseball, pitcher A. J. Burnett had a reputation for pieing teammates who drove in or scored the winning run in a walk-off win (a game won on a hit by the last batter).

Burnett's "pies" were filled with either shaving cream or whipped cream. Burnett pied Alex Rodriguez, Johnny Damon, Melky Cabrera, Jorge Posada, Hideki Matsui, Nick Swisher (twice), Robinson Canó (twice), Francisco Cervelli, Juan Miranda, Mark Teixeira, Jerry Hairston Jr., Marcus Thames, Brett Gardner, Alex Presley, Josh Harrison and Russell Martin. Burnett usually pied the player while he was being interviewed on the field by a TV reporter.

Other players have become well-known and celebrated for their pieing. During his tenure as a member of the Philadelphia Phillies, utility infielder Tomás Pérez would commonly pie teammates during post-game interviews.

The pieing tradition in baseball has extended beyond game-winning hits to any outstanding performance. Rookie Stephen Strasburg was pied by teammate John Lannan after his historic debut when he struck out 14 Pittsburgh batters. Matt Garza of the Tampa Bay Rays was pied by Evan Longoria after Garza pitched the first no-hitter in Rays history July 26, 2010. Most recently, Baltimore Orioles rookie Manny Machado was pied by teammates Robert Andino and Adam Jones after hitting two home runs (the youngest Oriole ever to do so) in only his second major league game.

On July 26, 2010, the Florida Marlins left fielder Chris Coghlan injured himself while pieing teammate Wes Helms after Helms's single won the game in the bottom of the 11th inning. In response, manager Edwin Rodríguez said that there will be no more such celebratory antics.

=== American football ===
In the National Football League, the Indianapolis Colts' mascot Blue is known for pranking opposing fans, mascots, and unsuspecting people with pies to the face. Blue has also pied the Colts' cheerleaders numerous times. When the Colts revealed their schedule for the 2022 NFL season on Instagram, Blue pied team employees wearing t-shirts of the opposing teams that the Colts were set to face.

== See also ==
- Egging
- Food fight
- Glitter bombing
- Incidents of objects being thrown at politicians
- List of people who have been pied
- List of practical joke topics
- Milkshaking
- Mud pie
- Shoeing
- Slapstick comedy
