= Concert party (entertainment) =

Troupe of popular entertainers, usually travelling

A concert party, also called a Pierrot troupe, is the collective name for a group of entertainers, or Pierrots, popular in Britain during the first half of the 20th century. The variety show given by a Pierrot troupe was called a Pierrot show.

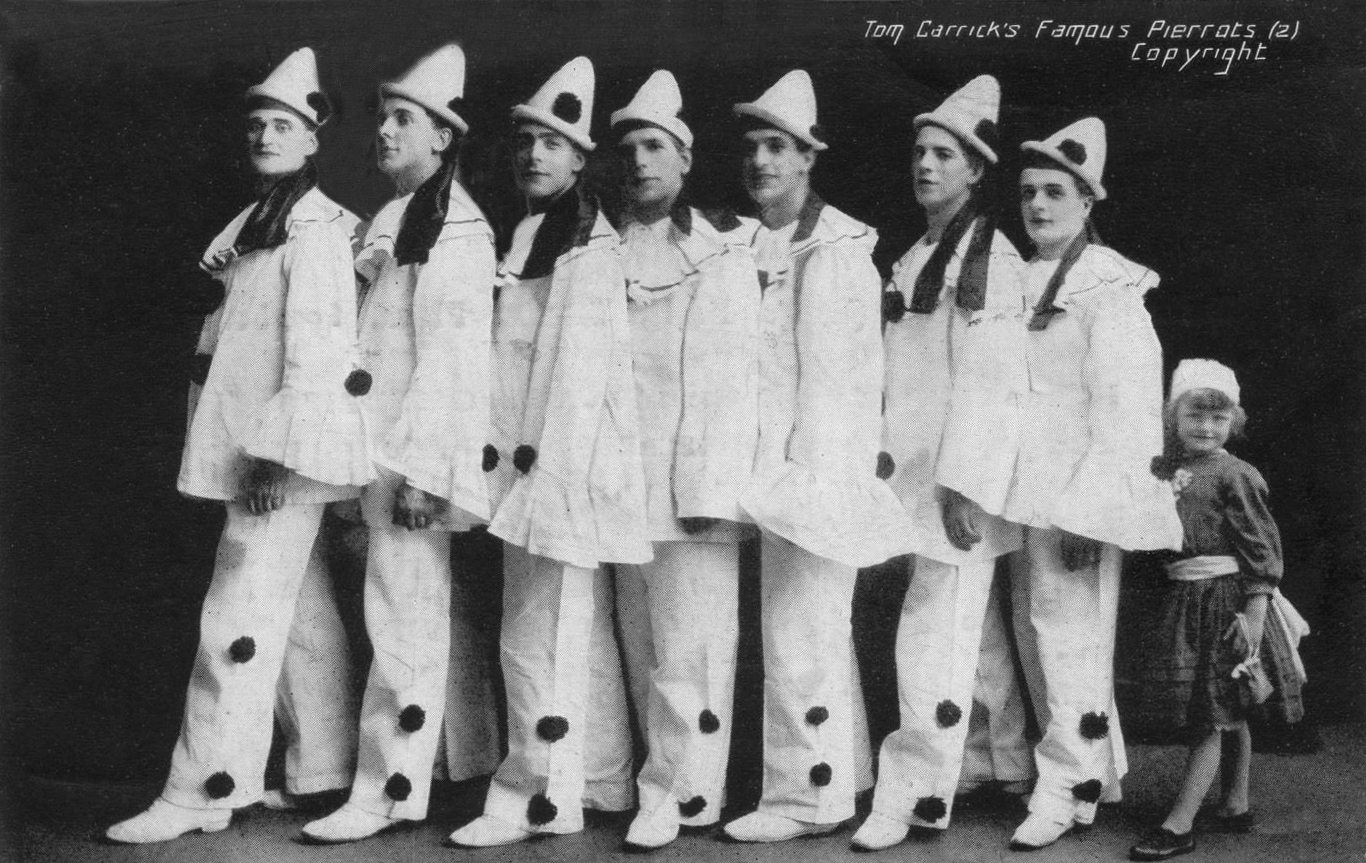
Pierrot troupe at Scarborough, c. 1905

Concert parties were travelling shows of songs and comedy, often put on at the seaside and opening with a Pierrot number.

== History ==
In 1891, the singer and banjoist Clifford Essex, inspired by Michel Carré fils' pantomime L'enfant prodigue (1890), which he had seen at the Prince of Wales' Theatre (of the latter known as the Scala Theatre) in London, resolved to create a troupe of English Pierrot entertainers. Thus began the tradition of seaside Pierrots in pointed hats and black or coloured costumes who sang, danced, juggled, and joked on the piers of Brighton, Margate and Blackpool from the 1890s until the 1950s. The style of performance attracted artists from music hall and variety theatre. Some performers, such as Neville Kennard, were known as specialists in the field.

Immensely popular in Great Britain from the 1920s to the 1940s, concert parties were also formed by several countries' armed forces during the First and Second World Wars. During the Second World War, the British Armed Forces' concert party became known as the Entertainments National Service Association (ENSA), later succeeded by the Combined Services Entertainment (CSE). The members of a Royal Artillery concert party are the focus of the sitcom It Ain't Half Hot Mum.

As other forms of entertainment (particularly television) replaced variety shows in general, concert parties largely died out during the 1950s. This form of entertainment has been described by Roy Hudd as long-gone and much lamented.

The most famous fictitious concert party outside the armed forces was The Good Companions in J. B. Priestley's eponymous novel. In the novel Sylvia Scarlett, the main characters (Cary Grant and Katharine Hepburn in the film version) form a concert party, The Pink Pierrots. A Pierrot troupe features strongly in Enid Blyton's 1952 children's book, The Rubadub Mystery.

== Bibliography ==
- Pertwee, Bill. Pertwee’s Promenades and Pierrots: One Hundred Years of Seaside Entertainment. Newton Abbot (Eng.): Westbridge Books, 1979.
- Columbia University, Press."J.B.Priestley". "Columbia Electronic Encyclopedia, 6th Edition(2013): 1. History Reference Center. web. 15 Apr. 2013.
- RIM, plc." Roy Hudd". Hutchinson's Biography Database(2011): 1. History Reference Center. web. 15 Apr. 2013.
