= Otto Larsen (sociologist) =

American sociologist

Otto Nyholm Larsen (January 23, 1922 – May 20, 2007) was an American sociologist at the University of Washington specializing in social psychology. He served as Chair of the Department of Sociology and as Director of the Institute for Sociological Research.

== Life and career ==
Larsen was born in Tyler, Minnesota. He received his undergraduate education from Grand View College in Des Moines, Iowa, and the University of Oregon, University of Montana, and University of Denver. He earned a Ph.D. from the University of Washington, joining the faculty in 1951.

Larsen did extensive research into incidents of mass hysteria, like the 1954 Seattle windshield pitting epidemic. This led to his appointment by Lyndon B. Johnson as Chair of the President's Commission on Obscenity and Pornography. On May 13, 1970, Larsen became one of the first people who have been pied as a form of political protest. Thomas Forcade hit Larsen with a cottage cheese pie during the commission's public hearings. The Commission ultimately recommended sex education and found that obscenity and pornography were not important social problems, that there was no evidence that exposure to such material was harmful to individuals, and that current legal and policy initiatives were more likely to create problems than solve them. Johnson's successor Richard Nixon and the Senate rejected the Commission findings.

Upon becoming editor of the Alpha Kappa Deltan sociology journal, Larsen renamed it Sociological Inquiry.

== Selected publications ==
- DeFleur ML, Larsen ON (1958).The flow of information: an experiment in mass communication. reprint Transaction Publishers, ISBN 978-0-88738-675-6
- Medalia NZ, Larsen ON (1964). Diffusion and belief in a collective delusion: The Seattle windshield pitting epidemic. American Sociological Review, Vol. 23, No. 2 (Apr., 1958), pp. 180–186
- Larsen ON, Hill RJ (1954). Mass media and interpersonal communication in the diffusion of a news event. American Sociological Review Vol. 19, No. 4 (Aug., 1954), pp. 426–433
- Larsen ON (1964). Social effects of mass communication. In Robert E. Lee Faris (ed.) Handbook of modern sociology. Rand McNally ASIN B0006D6FNC
