= Thomas Lawrence Higgins =

American gay rights activist (1950–1994)

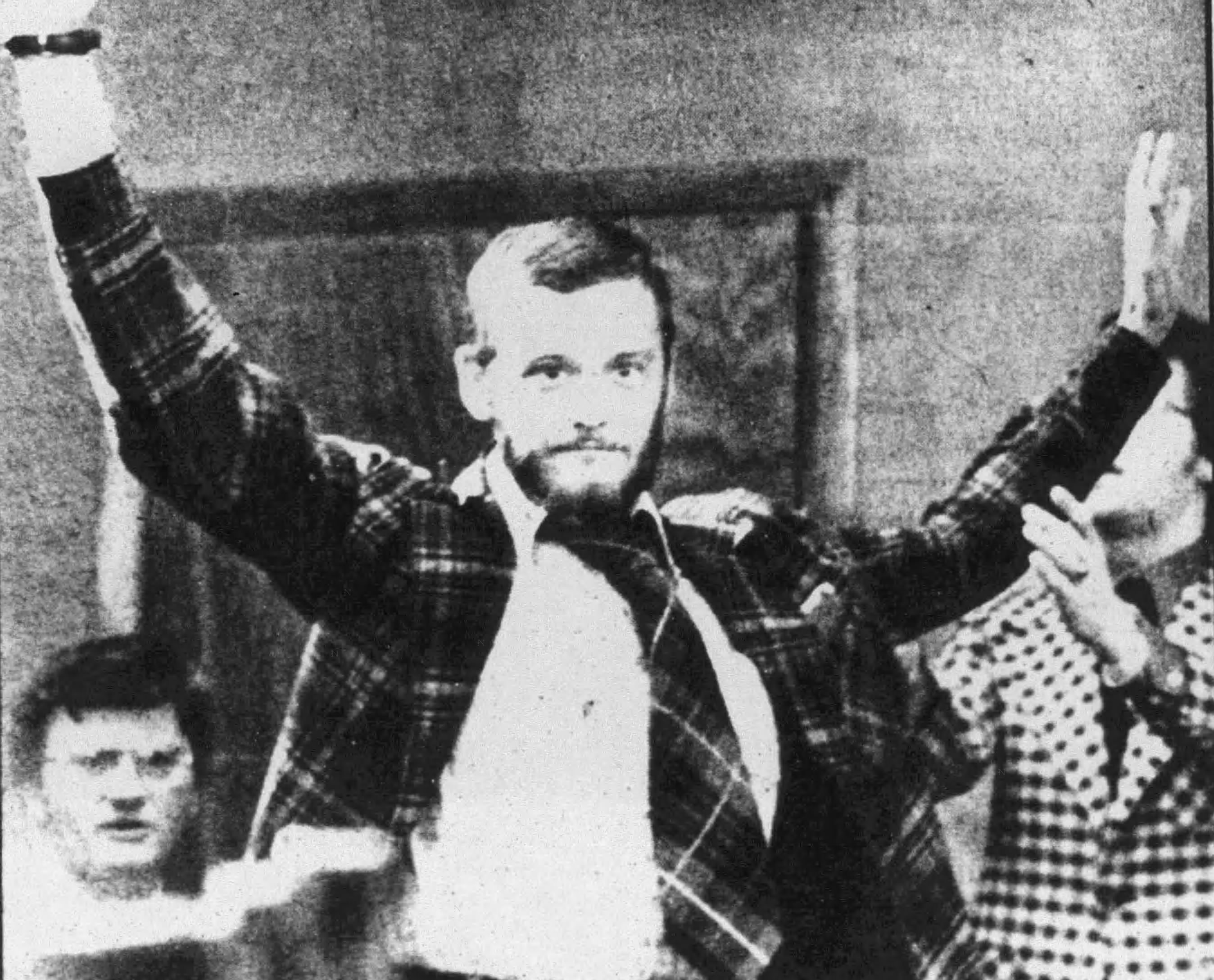
- Higgins in 1977 shortly after pieing Bryant
- Born: June 17, 1950; Beaver Dam, Wisconsin, US
- Died: November 10, 1994 (aged 44); Roseville, Minnesota, US
- Occupations: Writer, nurse
- Years active: 1967–1994
- Known for: Gay rights activism, pieing Anita Bryant

Thomas Lawrence Higgins (June 17, 1950 – November 10, 1994) was an American writer and gay rights activist credited with coining the term gay pride. He is best known for pushing a pie into the face of anti-gay activist Anita Bryant on live television in 1977.

== Early life ==
Higgins was born in Beaver Dam, Wisconsin. He attended Catholic elementary school in Minnesota as well as Catholic high schools in Minnesota and North Dakota before being accepted to the University of North Dakota in 1967 to study in journalism and theater. He was suspended in 1968 for his involvement in an underground student publication Snow Job.

== Career and activism ==
In 1969 Higgins became the first person in Minnesota to be granted conscientious objector status from the Vietnam War. Around this time he joined the Fight Repression of Erotic Expression (FREE), where he is credited with coining the term gay pride. He was terminated from his job at the State Radio Services for the Blind as a result of his affiliation with FREE. In response FREE picketed his former workplace, protesting for anti-discrimination protections.

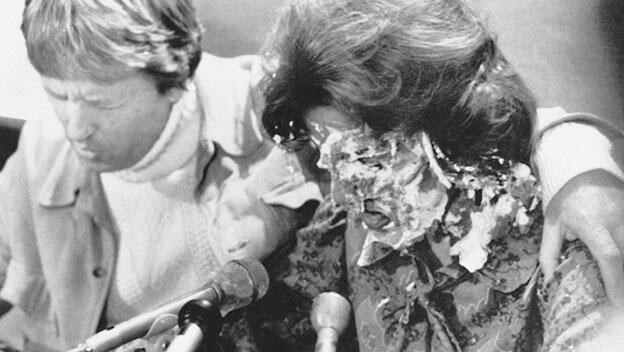
Bryant (right) after being pied in the face

On October 14, 1977, Higgins and his friend and fellow gay rights activist Bruce Brockway attended a televised pre-concert press conference hosted by singer Anita Bryant, who was answering questions about her plan to open a network of Anita Bryant Centers where "homosexuals could go for rehabilitation." During the conference Higgins got up, and pushed a banana cream pie into Bryant's face. Afterwards he and four companions exited the studio to answer questions for the media. Bryant's husband Bob Green noticed one of them holding an unused pie, and pressed it into his face in retaliation. Criminal charges were not filed against Higgins. Earlier in the year, Higgins had also been involved in the pieing of John Roach.

In 1980, Higgins and Brockway founded the Positively Gay Cuban Refugee Task Force, in response to an influx of refugees fleeing Cuba. Among these refugees were gay men, who faced legal persecution in their home country. They were all housed in refugee camps, and were unable to leave without an American sponsor. The organization helped mobilize Minneapolis's gay community to sponsor gay refugees, and allow them to leave and resettle.

== Death ==
Higgins died of AIDS complications on November 10, 1994. He is buried in Roseville, Minnesota.
