= Entartistes =

Canadian satirical political group

The entartistes were a Canadian satirical political group, active in the late 1990s and early 2000s, whose members threw cream pies at political and cultural figures whom the group deemed to be in need of public embarrassment. A member of the group, who identified himself only as Pope-Tart, told the Montreal Gazette in 1999 that the group's core philosophy was "You work for us. You can't be too big for your britches or you'll get a pie in the face."

== History ==
The group was founded by several former members of the Rhinoceros Party of Canada, including François Gourd. They initially convened in 1995 to offer a $400 reward to anybody from across Canada who successfully pied Prime Minister Jean Chrétien; however, after nobody accepted the offer at the time, they began to plan their own pieings.

Other figures pied by the group included Jean Charest, Mario Dumont, Stéphane Dion, Allan Rock, Pierre Pettigrew, William Johnson, Pierre Bourque, Jean Doré, Jacques Parizeau, Bernard Landry and Jacques Duchesneau. Quebec politicians were the most common targets, although the group also pied Sylvester Stallone during a 1998 promotional tour.

The group also inspired other attempts at pieing by offshoot groups across Canada. After the group released an updated "hit list" of desired targets in 1999 which included Chrétien, media mogul Conrad Black and pop singer Céline Dion, Chrétien was successfully pied in 2000 by Evan Brown, a member of an offshoot group in Prince Edward Island which called itself the PEI Pie Brigade. Ralph Klein was pied in 2003 by Alberta resident Christopher Geoghegan.

== Criminal charges ==
While some figures pied by the group accepted the embarrassment in good humour, several others filed charges of assault against the pie-throwers.

Bruno Caron, who had pied Parizeau, faced criminal charges in 1999. He pleaded guilty in 2000, and was sentenced to 60 hours of community service.

Stéphane Dion also pressed charges against the group after his pieing, resulting in convictions of assault against group members Patrick Robert and Benoit Foisy. Both were sentenced to 60 hours of community service. The Globe and Mail subsequently identified Robert as the formerly anonymous group spokesman "Pope-Tart".

Geoghegan was found guilty of assault against Klein in 2004, and sentenced to 60 days of jail time to be served on weekends, 40 hours of community service and three months' probation.

Evan Brown, who pied Jean Chrétien, was found guilty of assault and sentenced to 30 days of jail time, and ordered to contribute $50 toward a victims' compensation fund. The shame from the experience led Brown to quit his acting career and move to Halifax, Nova Scotia to become a theater technician, later writing a one-man show about the experience.
