= Biotic Baking Brigade =

Activist group

- Website: Official website (archived)

The Biotic Baking Brigade is a loosely connected group of activists famous for throwing pies in the faces of such figures as Bill Gates, San Francisco mayors Willie Brown and Gavin Newsom, anti-gay preacher Fred Phelps, economist Milton Friedman, Swedish King Carl Gustaf, former Canadian Prime Minister Jean Chrétien, conservative journalist William F. Buckley, right-wing Dutch politician Pim Fortuyn, former WTO head Renato Ruggiero, and Ann Coulter, among others.

The group espouses a left-wing philosophy, with members also active in ecology, social justice, gay rights, animal rights, anarchist and feminist movements, with connections to groups like Earth First!, Food Not Bombs, and ACT UP. It opposes corporate neoliberalism as well as any institution or individual who commits "crimes against people and the land."

Concerning the group, popular activist Jim Hightower has stated "The BBB's pies are the Boston Tea Party of our modern day, sending a serious message softly to the corporate oligarchy." Jello Biafra has similarly asked, "Is well placed humor one of the best protest tactics there is? The proof is in the pudding! Or should I say – pie cream."

Members have been tried for battery and assault as a result of their pieing.

== See also ==
- List of people who have been pied
