= Neville Kennard =

English actor, comedian and writer (1900–1963)

- Born: Lord Nevill Brown c.September 1900; Eastbourne, Sussex, England
- Died: 30 December 1963 (aged 63); Cuckfield, Sussex, England
- Occupations: Actor, writer, comedian
- Years active: 1920s–1963
- Spouse: Gladys Wells

Neville Kennard (born Lord Nevil Brown; c. September 1900 – 30 December 1963) was an English actor, comedian and writer, most active in the 1920s, 1930s and 1940s. He was a prolific writer of sketches and a specialist in variety entertainment, who was one of the most famous names associated with the concert party form of entertainment.

== Early life ==
Neville Kennard, real name Lord Nevil Brown, was born in Eastbourne in 1900, the son of Harriet (née Kennard) and Edwin Brown, a carpenter. They had married on 20 February 1892 in Ripe, Sussex where Harriet was from. Lord Nevil was the third of at least five children. He grew up in 12 Mona Road with his four sisters: Evelyn Violet (born 1896), Winifred Kennard (1898 - 1982), Bessie Lilian (born 1903) and Gwendoline Isabella Linda (born 1906). Lord Nevil Brown took as his stage name Neville Kennard (his middle name plus the surname of his maternal grandfather, George Kennard).

== Career ==
Kennard's career was initially encouraged by the great music-hall comedian, Sam Mayo. Neville's early years were with alfresco concert parties, a form of entertainment described as long-gone and much lamented. He performed in variety alongside the comedian, Gladys Wells, who later became his wife. Together they were often billed as "Kennard and Wells". In the 1930s he advertised himself as "The Perfect Fool" alongside Gladys Wells (billed as a Comedienne). It was at this time that he spent a number of seasons at the Windmill Theatre.

He also toured with Fred Karno's Mumming Birds, an act made famous previously by the pairing of Charles Chaplin and Stan Laurel. He later became a popular principal comedian in pantomime, revue and summer show. During the Second World War, he continued to perform in pantomime. At every performance of the 1943 pantomime, "Cinderella," Neville Kennard, who played Buttons, appealed for anything smokeable for the troops.

He also presented his own summer shows, and wrote a number of successful concert party sketches including: The tale of a tail; At your service; Babies in the park; and probably the most performed *It's Up To You Sir. In the "It's Up To You Sir" sketch the audience were invited to make suggestions as to how the sketch should proceed. After the gradual demise of concert party and other forms of variety, mainly due to the rise of cinema, he remained active. In 1949 he started to write a weekly column in the theatrical newspaper The Performer all about summer shows. It was called "Pom Poms and Ruffles" and was so successful that he continued it once the winter started and called it "Bon Bons and Trifles". He spent his later years, from 1956, in Eastbourne.

He died on 30 December 1963 and in the "Business of the Theatrical Managers' Association" section of The Stage magazine a small obituary was posted.

== Personal life ==
Kennard was married to Gladys Wells (real name Gladys B. Turner) who on a number of occasions performed with him. They had married at the latter end of 1938 in Hendon, Middlesex. Despite much of their work being in London, they lived for most of the 1930s in Sharrow. At the end of the thirties they had relocated to Kenton before finally living in Eastbourne from 1956. He died in Cuckfield, Sussex in 1963.
