= Sarah Duhamel =

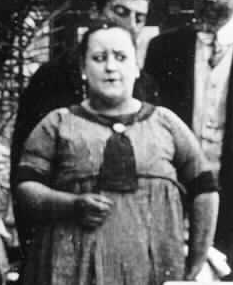

Marie Marguerite Sarah Duhamel (March 21, 1873 – April 15, 1926) was a French stage and film comedienne.

== Career ==
Duhamel was the daughter of an operetta singer and appeared on stage at a very young age. In 1893 she made her debut as a singer with the play Eldorado, and consequently went on a two-year tour through Italy and the South of France. From 1895 on she worked at various revues in Paris. In 1910 she met the film director Romeo Bosetti who worked for Pathé Comica in Nice. She made several short comedy films with Bosetti, her character was called ‘Rosalie’ (in the English-speaking countries ‘Jane’). Later she started working for the company Eclair (La Société française des films et cinématographiques Eclair) where her character was called Pétronille. She was also cast to star with Maurice Schwartz in the Little Moritz series, and with Lucien Bataille in his Casimir comedies.

Duhamel’s partnership with Bosetti lasted until 1916, when he stopped filmmaking due to his injuries suffered during the WWI. After the World War I, Duhamel's career became less successful, though she continued to work on stage and for films.

== Private life ==
In 1915 Duhamel married Édouard Louis Schmitt (1884-1972), a fellow stage actor better known as Darmaine or Darmène. Duhamel’s older sister Louise Jeanne Bibiane Duhamel (1870-1910) was also famous as an operetta singer.

== Filmography ==
=== As Rosalie ===
- 1911 : Little Moritz enlève Rosalie (Henri Gambart, scénario Romeo Bosetti)
- 1911 : Rosalie et Léontine vont au théâtre (Romeo Bosetti)
- 1911 : Rosalie a trouvé du travail (Romeo Bosetti)
- 1911 : Le jour de l'an de Rosalie [Romeo Bosetti ?]
- 1911 : La Mitrailleuse [Romeo Bosetti ?]
- 1911 : Domestiques bon teint [Romeo Bosetti ?]
- 1911 : Rosalie et son phonographe [Romeo Bosetti]
- 1912 : Je ne veux plus de cuisinière [Romeo Bosetti ?]
- 1912 : Les Araignées de Rosalie [Romeo Bosetti ?]
- 1912 : C'est la faute à Rosalie [Romeo Bosetti ?]

=== As Pétronille ===
- 1911 : Little Moritz et le papillon
- 1912 : Pétronille gagne le grand steeple
- 1913 : Pétronille à la caserne
- 1913 : Pétronille cherche une situation
- 1913 : Le Singe de Pétronille
- 1913 : Gavroche au pensionnat de Pétronille
- 1913 : Gavroche et Pétronille visitent Berlin
- 1913 : Gavroche et Pétronille visitent Londres
- 1913 : Pour gagner le million
- 1913 : Casimir et Pétronille font bon ménage
- 1913 : Casimir et Pétronille font de l'auto
- 1913 : Casimir et Pétronille font un héritage
- 1914 : Casimir et Pétronille n'ont pas vu les souverains
- 1914 : Casimir fait de l'entrainement
- 1914 : Casimir, Pétronille et l'Entente cordiale
- 1914 : Casimir tangue
- 1914 : La Vengeance de Casimir
- 1914 : Le Désespoir de Pétronille
- 1914 : Pétronille porteuse de pain
- 1914 : Pétronille suffragette
- 1914 : La Ruse de Pétronille
- 1916 : Casimir et Pétronille au bal de l'ambassade

=== Other films ===
- 1912 : Un drame passionnel
- 1916 : C'est pour les orphelins ! (Louis Feuillade)
- 1922 : Les Mystères de Paris (Charles Burguet)

== Stage work ==
- 1889 : Monsieur Alphonse, (Alexandre Dumas fils) : Adrienne
- 1892 : Article de Paris (Maxime Boucheron, Edmond Audran)
- 1892 : La Petite Pologne, (Lambert Thiboust and Ernest Blum): Fauvette
- 1892 : Les Mouchards, (Jules Moinaux and Paul Parfait) : Andrée
- 1892 : La Lune à Paris, (Jules Oudot, Léon Nunès, and Léon Schlésinger) : Miss Helyett
- 1895 : Les Contes de Piron, (Gaston Habrekorn and Célestin Controne) : Suzanne
- 1895 : Paris-Sensuel, (Léon Némo and A. Bural) : la commère
- 1896 : Les Bibelots du diable, (Théodore Cogniard and Clairville) : Risette
- 1896 : Les Deux rosses, (Pierre Decourcelle by Paul Briollet and Jacques Yvel, and Émile Duhem and Émile Cambillard)
- 1896 : La Petite goualeuse, (Gaston Marot and A. Lévy) : la petite goualeuse
- 1902 : La Demoiselle de chez Maxim's, (Gardel-Hervé) : la môme Grenouille
- 1903 : Josiane !, (Valérien Tranel and Eugène Joullot) : Josiane
- 1908 : Cartes transparentes, (Jules Moy)
- 1908 : Une nuit tragique au pays du Czar, (Montéhus) : l'héroïne
- 1910 : Pige-moi ça !, (Cinq-Mars and Charles Pillon) : la femme au cadenas
- 1910 : La Conscrite, (Raoul Hugo) : la colonelle
- 1922 : Madame Cantharide, (Louis Lemarchand and Fernand Rouvray)
