= 2024 United States presidential election in Arizona =

- November 5, 2024
- Turnout: 78.49% (of registered voters) ▼1.4 pp

Nominee	Donald Trump	Kamala Harris
Party	Republican	Democratic
Home state	Florida	California
Running mate	JD Vance	Tim Walz
Electoral vote	11	0
Popular vote	1,770,242	1,582,860
Percentage	52.22%	46.69%

Trump
40–50%
50–60%
60–70%
70–80%
80–90%
90–100%
Harris
40–50%
50–60%
60–70%
70–80%
80–90%
90–100%
Tie/No data
President before election
Joe Biden
Democratic
Elected President
Donald Trump
Republican

The 2024 United States presidential election in Arizona took place on Tuesday, November 5, 2024, as part of the 2024 United States presidential election in which all 50 states plus the District of Columbia participated. Arizona voters chose electors to represent them in the Electoral College via a popular vote. The state of Arizona has 11 electoral votes in the Electoral College, following reapportionment due to the 2020 United States census in which the state neither gained nor lost a seat. Arizona was considered a crucial swing state in 2024. Donald Trump won by 5.5 percent.

The Republican nominee was former president Donald Trump. Formerly a moderately red state, Trump won Arizona in 2016 by 3.5%, a reduced margin of Republican victory compared to previous cycles, despite a more favorable presidential election year for the GOP nationwide. Biden narrowly won in Arizona in 2020 by 0.3%. Due to the diversification of Maricopa County, a traditionally Republican stronghold that holds 61.6% of the state's population, the state was now considered a purple state. Robert F. Kennedy Jr. had gathered enough signatures to appear on the ballot, but his petition was eventually withdrawn.

Donald Trump won Arizona by 5.5%, surpassing the margins predicted by most polls. This was the largest margin of victory since 2012 for a Republican presidential candidate, as well as the first time since 2012 that a presidential candidate won the state with an absolute majority of the vote. It was Trump's largest margin of victory in any of the seven key swing states, all of which he won. It was also Trump's strongest performance in a state won by Biden in 2020.

== Primary elections ==
=== Democratic primary ===
The Arizona Democratic primary was held on March 19, 2024, alongside primaries in Florida, Illinois, and Ohio.

2024 Arizona Democratic pres. primary
Candidate	Votes	%	Delegates
Joe Biden (incumbent)	375,110	89.27	72
Marianne Williamson	15,844	3.77	0
Dean Phillips (withdrawn)	11,611	2.76	0
Gabriel Cornejo (withdrawn)	6,128	1.46	0
Frankie Lozada (withdrawn)	4,976	1.18	0
Jason Palmer	3,752	0.89	0
Stephen Lyons (withdrawn)	2,753	0.66	0
Total	420,174	100%	72

=== Republican primary ===
The Arizona Republican primary was held on March 19, 2024, alongside primaries in Florida, Illinois, and Ohio.

Arizona Republican primary, March 19, 2024
Candidate	Votes	Percentage	Actual delegate count		
Candidate	Votes	Percentage	Bound	Unbound	Total
Donald Trump	492,299	78.84%	43		43
Nikki Haley (withdrawn)	110,966	17.77%			
Ron DeSantis (withdrawn)	10,131	1.62%			
Chris Christie (withdrawn)	5,078	0.81%			
Vivek Ramaswamy (withdrawn)	2,479	0.40%			
David Stuckenberg	1,367	0.22%			
Ryan Binkley (withdrawn)	891	0.14%			
Asa Hutchinson (withdrawn)	714	0.11%			
John Anthony Castro	505	0.08%			
Total:	624,430	100.00%	43		43

Arizona Representative Rachel Jones, a Republican, introduced an unsuccessful resolution in February 2024 that would request that the Arizona governor "change the manner of the presidential election by appointing the eleven presidential electors to the Republican primary winner to offset the removal of a Republican candidate from the ballot in Colorado and Maine".

== General election ==
=== Candidates ===
The following candidates have qualified and were on the presidential general election ballot in Arizona.

- Kamala Harris — Democratic
- Donald Trump — Republican
- Chase Oliver — Libertarian
- Jill Stein — Green
- President R Boddie — Nonpartisan (Write-in)
- Dawanda Shelton — Independent (Write-in)
- Joel Skousen — Constitution Party (Write-in)

=== Predictions ===
Source	Ranking	As of
The Cook Political Report	Tossup	November 4, 2024
Sabato's Crystal Ball	Lean R (flip)	November 4, 2024
Decision Desk HQ/The Hill	Tossup	November 4, 2024
CNN	Tossup	November 4, 2024
CNalysis	Tilt R (flip)	November 4, 2024
The Economist	Lean R (flip)	November 4, 2024
538	Lean R (flip)	November 4, 2024
Inside Elections	Tossup	November 3, 2024
NBC News	Tossup	November 4, 2024

=== Election rule changes ===
Mi Familia Vota led a coalition of civil rights organizations with the US Department of Justice to sue Arizona over a 2022 law passed by its GOP legislature that tried to bar voters who had not provided proof of citizenship when they registered. In Republican National Committee v. Mi Familia Vota, the Supreme Court ruled that those already registered voters could still vote, but that new voters had to provide proof of citizenship if registering with the state of Arizona's voter registration form. Voters using the national voter registration form will still be registered and do not have to provide proof of citizenship.

=== Polling ===
Kamala Harris vs. Donald Trump

Aggregate polls

Source of poll aggregation	Dates administered	Dates updated	Kamala Harris Democratic	Donald Trump Republican	Other / Undecided (Note: Calculated by taking the difference of 100% and all other candidates combined.)	Margin
270ToWin	October 22 – November 4, 2024	November 5, 2024	46.8%	48.4%	4.8%	Trump +1.6%
538	through November 4, 2024	November 5, 2024	46.8%	48.9%	4.3%	Trump +2.1%
Silver Bulletin	through November 4, 2024	November 5, 2024	46.9%	49.3%	3.8%	Trump +2.4%
The Hill/DDHQ	through November 4, 2024	November 5, 2024	47.3%	49.9%	2.8%	Trump +2.6%
Average			47.0%	49.1%	3.9%	Trump +2.1%

Poll source	Date(s) administered	Sample size (Note: Key: A – all adults RV – registered voters LV – likely voters V – unclear)	Margin of error	Kamala Harris Democratic	Donald Trump Republican	Other / Undecided
HarrisX	November 3–5, 2024	1,636 (RV)	± 2.4%	46%	47%	7%
HarrisX	November 3–5, 2024	1,636 (RV)	± 2.4%	49% (Note: With voters who lean towards a given candidate)	51%	–
HarrisX	November 3–5, 2024	1,468 (LV)	± 2.4%	47%	49%	4%
HarrisX	November 3–5, 2024	1,468 (LV)	± 2.4%	49%	51%	–
AtlasIntel	November 3–4, 2024	875 (LV)	± 3.0%	47%	52%	1%
Victory Insights	November 2–3, 2024	750 (LV)	–	48%	49%	3% (Note: "Other" with 2%)
Trafalgar Group (R)	November 1–3, 2024	1,090 (LV)	± 2.9%	47%	49%	4% (Note: "Other" with 1%)
Patriot Polling	November 1–3, 2024	801 (RV)	± 3.0%	48%	51%	1%
InsiderAdvantage (R)	November 1–2, 2024	800 (LV)	± 3.0%	46%	49%	5%
AtlasIntel	November 1–2, 2024	967 (LV)	± 3.0%	46%	52%	2%
Emerson College	October 30 – November 2, 2024	900 (LV)	± 3.3%	48%	50%	2% (Note: "Someone else" with 1%)
Emerson College	October 30 – November 2, 2024	900 (LV)	± 3.3%	48%	51%	1%
The New York Times/Siena College	October 25 – November 2, 2024	1,025 (RV)	± 3.5%	44%	48%	8%
The New York Times/Siena College	October 25 – November 2, 2024	1,025 (LV)	± 3.5%	45%	49%	6%
ActiVote	October 8 – November 1, 2024	400 (LV)	± 4.9%	49%	51%	–
SoCal Strategies (R) (Note: Poll sponsored by On Point Politics & Red Eagle Politics)	October 30–31, 2024	750 (LV)	± 4.0%	49%	50%	1%
AtlasIntel	October 30–31, 2024	1,005 (LV)	± 3.0%	47%	51%	2%
OnMessage Inc. (R)	October 29–31, 2024	800 (LV)	–	47%	50%	3%
YouGov (Note: Poll conducted for The Times, Stanford University, Arizona State University, and Yale University)	October 25–31, 2024	880 (RV)	± 4.4%	49%	50%	1%
YouGov	October 25–31, 2024	856 (LV)	± 4.4%	49%	50%	1%
Morning Consult	October 21−30, 2024	666 (LV)	± 4.0%	48%	48%	4%
Rasmussen Reports (R) (Note: Poll sponsored by American Thinker)	October 25–29, 2024	803 (LV)	± 3.0%	46%	48%	6%
AtlasIntel	October 25–29, 2024	1,458 (LV)	± 3.0%	47%	51%	2%
Mitchell Research & Communications	October 28, 2024	610 (LV)	± 4.0%	48%	50%	2%
RABA Research	October 25–27, 2024	589 (RV)	± 4.0%	45%	43%	12% (Note: "Someone else" with 7%)
Trafalgar Group (R)	October 24–26, 2024	1,094 (LV)	± 2.9%	46%	48%	6%
CES/YouGov	October 1–25, 2024	2,077 (A)	–	49%	49%	2%
CES/YouGov	October 1–25, 2024	2,066 (LV)	–	47%	51%	2%
Marist College	October 17–22, 2024	1,329 (RV)	± 3.5%	49%	49%	2% (Note: "Another party's candidates" with 1%)
Marist College	October 17–22, 2024	1,193 (LV)	± 3.7%	49%	50%	1%
InsiderAdvantage (R)	October 20–21, 2024	800 (LV)	± 3.0%	47%	50%	3%
HighGround	October 19–20, 2024	400 (LV)	± 4.9%	46%	47%	7%
Bloomberg/Morning Consult	October 16–20, 2024	915 (RV)	± 3.0%	49%	49%	2%
Bloomberg/Morning Consult	October 16–20, 2024	861 (LV)	± 3.0%	49%	49%	2%
University of Arizona/Truedot	October 12–20, 2024	846 (RV)	± 3.4%	46%	45%	9% (Note: "Someone else" with 3%)
AtlasIntel	October 12–17, 2024	1,440 (LV)	± 3.0%	49%	49%	2%
CBS News/YouGov	October 11−16, 2024	1,435 (LV)	± 3.3%	48%	51%	1%
Morning Consult	October 6−15, 2024	653 (LV)	± 3.0%	49%	48%	3%
The Washington Post/Schar School	September 30 – October 15, 2024	580 (RV)	± 5.0%	44%	50%	6%
The Washington Post/Schar School	September 30 – October 15, 2024	580 (LV)	± 5.0%	46%	49%	5%
Trafalgar Group (R)	October 10–13, 2024	1,090 (LV)	± 2.9%	46%	48%	6% (Note: "Other" with 3%)
The New York Times/Siena College	October 7–10, 2024	808 (RV)	± 4.0%	45%	51%	4%
The New York Times/Siena College	October 7–10, 2024	808 (LV)	± 4.0%	46%	51%	3%
Fabrizio, Lee & Associates (R)/McLaughlin & Associates (R) (Note: Poll sponsored by Trump's campaign)	October 6–9, 2024	800 (LV)	± 3.5%	46%	49%	5%
Emerson College	October 5–8, 2024	1,000 (LV)	± 3.0%	47%	49%	4%
Emerson College	October 5–8, 2024	1,000 (LV)	± 3.0%	48%	51%	1%
The Wall Street Journal	September 28 – October 8, 2024	600 (RV)	± 5.0%	48%	46%	6%
ActiVote	September 6 – October 8, 2024	400 (LV)	± 4.9%	49%	51%	–
SoCal Strategies (R)	October 5–7, 2024	735 (LV)	–	49%	48%	3%
RMG Research (Note: Poll sponsored by the Napolitan Institute)	September 30 – October 2, 2024	783 (LV)	± 3.5%	46%	50%	4% (Note: "Some other candidate" with 2%)
RMG Research	September 30 – October 2, 2024	783 (LV)	± 3.5%	46%	50%	4%
OnMessage Inc. (R) (Note: Poll conducted for the Article III Project)	September 24 – October 2, 2024	500 (LV)	± 4.4%	45%	47%	8%
Fabrizio Ward (R)/Impact Research (D) (Note: Poll commissioned by AARP)	September 24 – October 1, 2024	600 (LV)	± 4.0%	48%	50%	2%
InsiderAdvantage (R)	September 29–30, 2024	800 (LV)	± 3.0%	48%	49%	1%
HighGround (Note: Poll sponsored by Arizona's Family)	September 26–29, 2024	500 (LV)	± 4.4%	48%	46%	6%
National Research (Note: Poll sponsored by the Democracy Defense Project and Echo Canyon Consulting)	September 25–29, 2024	600 (LV)	± 4.0%	48%	47%	5%
Global Strategy Group (D)/North Star Opinion Research (R) (Note: Poll sponsored by the Peter G. Peterson Foundation)	September 23–29, 2024	400 (LV)	± 4.9%	48%	47%	5%
Emerson College (Note: Poll sponsored by RealClearWorld)	September 27–28, 2024	920 (LV)	± 3.2%	48%	50%	3%
Emerson College	September 27–28, 2024	920 (LV)	± 3.2%	48%	52%	–
AtlasIntel	September 20–25, 2024	946 (LV)	± 3.0%	49%	50%	1%
Cook Political Report/BSG (R)/GS Strategy Group (D)	September 19–25, 2024	409 (LV)	–	50%	48%	2%
Bloomberg/Morning Consult	September 19–25, 2024	977 (RV)	± 3.0%	50%	47%	3%
Bloomberg/Morning Consult	September 19–25, 2024	926 (LV)	± 3.0%	50%	47%	3%
Fox News	September 20−24, 2024	1,021 (RV)	± 3.0%	48%	50%	2%
Fox News	September 20−24, 2024	764 (LV)	± 3.5%	48%	51%	1%
Marist College	September 19−24, 2024	1,416 (RV)	± 3.6%	48%	50%	2%
Marist College	September 19−24, 2024	1,264 (LV)	± 3.8%	49%	50%	1%
Rasmussen Reports (R)	September 19–22, 2024	1,030 (LV)	± 3.0%	47%	49%	4%
The New York Times/Siena College	September 17–21, 2024	713 (RV)	± 4.4%	45%	49%	6%
The New York Times/Siena College	September 17–21, 2024	713 (LV)	± 4.4%	45%	50%	5%
Emerson College	September 15–18, 2024	868 (LV)	± 3.3%	48%	49%	3% (Note: "Someone else" with 2%)
Emerson College	September 15–18, 2024	868 (LV)	± 3.3%	49%	50%	1%
Morning Consult	September 9−18, 2024	862 (LV)	± 3.0%	48%	47%	5%
Trafalgar Group (R)	September 11–12, 2024	1,088 (LV)	± 2.9%	46%	47%	7%
Data Orbital (Note: Poll sponsored by AZ Free News)	September 7–9, 2024	550 (LV)	± 2.9%	46%	46%	8%
Morning Consult	August 30 – September 8, 2024	901 (LV)	± 3.0%	47%	49%	4%
TIPP Insights (Note: Poll sponsored by American Greatness)	September 3–5, 2024	1,015 (RV)	± 3.2%	46%	46%	8%
TIPP Insights	September 3–5, 2024	949 (LV)	± 3.2%	47%	47%	6%
Patriot Polling	September 1–3, 2024	804 (RV)	–	47%	49%	4%
InsiderAdvantage (R)	August 29–31, 2024	800 (LV)	± 3.0%	48%	49%	3%
University of Arizona/Truedot	August 28–31, 2024	1,155 (RV)	–	42%	46%	12% (Note: "Someone else" with 5%)
Emerson College	August 25–28, 2024	720 (LV)	± 3.6%	47%	50%	7%
Emerson College	August 25–28, 2024	720 (LV)	± 3.6%	48%	51%	1%
Bloomberg/Morning Consult	August 23–26, 2024	776 (LV)	± 4.0%	48%	48%	4%
Bloomberg/Morning Consult	August 23–26, 2024	758 (RV)	± 3.0%	48%	48%	4%
Fox News	August 23–26, 2024	1,014 (RV)	± 3.0%	50%	49%	1%
Spry Strategies (R) (Note: Poll sponsored by the American Principles Project)	August 14–20, 2024	600 (LV)	± 4.0%	48%	49%	3%
Rasmussen Reports (R) (Note: Poll sponsored by NumbersUSA)	August 13–17, 2024	1,187 (LV)	± 3.0%	45%	47%	8%
Noble Predictive Insights	August 12–16, 2024	1,003 (RV)	± 3.0%	44%	47%	9%
Focaldata	August 6–16, 2024	702 (LV)	± 3.7%	49%	51%	–
Strategies 360	August 7–14, 2024	400 (RV)	± 4.9%	47%	46%	7%
The New York Times/Siena College	August 8–15, 2024	677 (RV)	± 4.4%	49%	45%	7%
The New York Times/Siena College	August 8–15, 2024	677 (LV)	± 4.4%	50%	45%	5%
Trafalgar Group (R)	August 6–8, 2024	1,092 (LV)	± 2.9%	47%	48%	5%
Navigator Research (D)	July 31 – August 8, 2024	600 (LV)	± 4.0%	46%	49%	5%
Cook Political Report/BSG (R)/GS Strategy Group (D)	July 26 – August 8, 2024	435 (LV)	–	48%	46%	6%
HighGround	July 30 – August 5, 2024	500 (LV)	± 4.4%	44%	42%	14% (Note: "Some other candidate" with 5%)
Public Policy Polling (D) (Note: Poll conducted for Progress Action Fund, which supports Democratic candidates)	July 29–30, 2024	618 (RV)	± 3.9%	47%	49%	4%
Public Opinion Strategies (R) (Note: Poll conducted for Competitiveness Coalition)	July 23–29, 2024	400 (LV)	± 4.9%	43%	48%	9%
Bloomberg/Morning Consult	July 24–28, 2024	804 (RV)	± 3.0%	49%	47%	4%
Emerson College	July 22–23, 2024	800 (RV)	± 3.4%	44%	49%	7%
Emerson College	July 22–23, 2024	800 (RV)	± 3.4%	47%	53%	–
	July 21, 2024	Kamala Harris declares her candidacy.				
InsiderAdvantage (R)	July 15–16, 2024	800 (LV)	± 3.5%	42%	48%	10%
Public Policy Polling (D)	July 10–11, 2024	596 (RV)	–	44%	52%	4%
Bloomberg/Morning Consult	May 7–13, 2024	795 (RV)	± 3.0%	42%	51%	7%
Emerson College	February 16–19, 2024	1,000 (RV)	± 3.0%	40%	48%	12%
The New York Times/Siena College	October 22 – November 3, 2023	603 (RV)	± 4.4%	43%	48%	9%
The New York Times/Siena College	October 22 – November 3, 2023	603 (LV)	± 4.4%	43%	48%	9%

Kamala Harris vs. Donald Trump vs. Cornel West vs. Jill Stein vs. Chase Oliver

Aggregate polls

Source of poll aggregation	Dates administered	Dates updated	Kamala Harris Democratic	Donald Trump Republican	Jill Stein Green	Cornel West Independent	Chase Oliver Libertarian	Others/ Undecided (Note: Calculated by taking the difference of 100% and all other candidates combined.)	Margin
Race to the WH	through October 10, 2024	October 15, 2024	46.4%	48.8%	1.0%	—N/a	0.8%	3.0%	Trump +2.4%
270toWin	October 2 – 12, 2024	October 12, 2024	47.4%	47.6%	1.0%	0.0%	0.5%	3.5%	Trump +0.2%
Average			46.9%	48.1%	1.0%	0.0%	0.8%	3.2%	Trump +1.2%

Poll source	Date(s) administered	Sample size	Margin of error	Kamala Harris Democratic	Donald Trump Republican	Cornel West Independent	Jill Stein Green	Chase Oliver Libertarian	Other / Undecided
HarrisX	November 3–5, 2024	1,636 (RV)	± 2.4%	44%	47%	1%	1%	–	7%
HarrisX	November 3–5, 2024	1,636 (RV)	± 2.4%	46%	50%	2%	2%	–	–
HarrisX	November 3–5, 2024	1,468 (LV)	± 2.4%	46%	49%	1%	1%	–	3%
HarrisX	November 3–5, 2024	1,468 (LV)	± 2.4%	47%	50%	2%	1%	–	–
AtlasIntel	November 3–4, 2024	875 (LV)	± 3.0%	46%	51%	–	1%	0%	2%
AtlasIntel	November 1–2, 2024	967 (LV)	± 3.0%	45%	52%	–	1%	1%	1%
The New York Times/Siena College	October 25 – November 2, 2024	1,025 (RV)	± 3.5%	42%	47%	–	3%	2%	6%
The New York Times/Siena College	October 25 – November 2, 2024	1,025 (LV)	± 3.5%	44%	48%	–	2%	1%	5%
Focaldata	October 3 – November 1, 2024	1,779 (LV)	–	48%	49%	–	1%	1%	1%
Focaldata	October 3 – November 1, 2024	1,603 (RV)	± 2.3%	49%	47%	–	2%	1%	1%
Focaldata	October 3 – November 1, 2024	1,779 (A)	–	49%	47%	–	2%	1%	1%
AtlasIntel	October 30–31, 2024	1,005 (LV)	± 3.0%	46%	51%	–	1%	1%	1%
Redfield & Wilton Strategies	October 28–31, 2024	652 (LV)	–	47%	48%	–	1%	1%	3%
YouGov	October 25–31, 2024	880 (RV)	± 4.4%	47%	48%	0%	1%	–	4%
YouGov	October 25–31, 2024	856 (LV)	± 4.4%	48%	48%	0%	0%	–	4%
Noble Predictive Insights	October 28–30, 2024	775 (LV)	± 3.5%	47%	48%	–	2%	0%	3%
Data for Progress (D)	October 25–30, 2024	1,079 (LV)	± 3.0%	47%	48%	–	1%	0%	4%
AtlasIntel	October 25–29, 2024	1,458 (LV)	± 3.0%	46%	51%	–	1%	0%	2%
Mitchell Research & Communications	October 28, 2024	610 (LV)	± 4.0%	48%	50%	–	0%	1%	1%
Data Orbital	October 26–28, 2024	550 (LV)	± 4.3%	42%	50%	–	1%	1%	6%
Redfield & Wilton Strategies	October 25–27, 2024	901 (LV)	–	47%	49%	–	1%	1%	2%
J.L. Partners	October 24–26, 2024	500 (LV)	± 4.4%	48%	49%	–	0%	1%	2%
CNN/SSRS	October 21–26, 2024	781 (LV)	± 4.4%	48%	47%	–	1%	2%	2%
Redfield & Wilton Strategies	October 20–22, 2024	710 (LV)	–	46%	48%	–	1%	1%	4%
Bloomberg/Morning Consult	October 16–20, 2024	915 (RV)	± 3.0%	48%	48%	–	1%	2%	1%
Bloomberg/Morning Consult	October 16–20, 2024	861 (LV)	± 3.0%	48%	48%	–	1%	2%	1%
Redfield & Wilton Strategies	October 16–18, 2024	691 (LV)	–	46%	49%	–	1%	1%	3%
AtlasIntel	October 12–17, 2024	1,440 (LV)	± 3.0%	49%	49%	–	1%	0%	1%
Redfield & Wilton Strategies	October 12–14, 2024	1,141 (LV)	–	46%	48%	–	1%	1%	4%
The New York Times/Siena College	October 7–10, 2024	808 (RV)	± 4.0%	44%	49%	–	2%	1%	4%
The New York Times/Siena College	October 7–10, 2024	808 (LV)	± 4.0%	45%	50%	–	1%	0%	4%
Redfield & Wilton Strategies	September 27 – October 2, 2024	555 (LV)	–	47%	48%	–	1%	1%	3%
Fabrizio Ward (R)/Impact Research (D) (Note: Poll commissioned by AARP)	September 24 – October 1, 2024	600 (LV)	± 4.0%	47%	49%	–	1%	0%	3%
AtlasIntel	September 20–25, 2024	946 (LV)	± 3.0%	49%	50%	–	0%	–	1%
Cook Political Report/BSG (R)/GS Strategy Group (D)	September 19–25, 2024	409 (LV)	–	50%	47%	–	1%	–	2%
Bloomberg/Morning Consult	September 19–25, 2024	977 (RV)	± 3.0%	49%	46%	–	1%	2%	2%
Bloomberg/Morning Consult	September 19–25, 2024	926 (LV)	± 3.0%	49%	46%	–	1%	2%	2%
Fox News	September 20−24, 2024	1,021 (RV)	± 3.0%	47%	49%	1%	1%	2%	−
Fox News	September 20−24, 2024	764 (LV)	± 3.5%	47%	50%	0%	1%	2%	−
Suffolk University/USA Today	September 19−24, 2024	500 (LV)	± 4.4%	42%	48%	–	1%	1%	8%
The New York Times/Siena College	September 17–21, 2024	713 (RV)	± 4.4%	42%	47%	–	2%	3%	6%
The New York Times/Siena College	September 17–21, 2024	713 (LV)	± 4.4%	43%	48%	–	2%	2%	5%
Redfield & Wilton Strategies	September 16–19, 2024	789 (LV)	–	47%	47%	–	1%	1%	4%
Redfield & Wilton Strategies	September 6–9, 2024	765 (LV)	–	46%	47%	–	1%	1%	5%
TIPP Insights	September 3–5, 2024	1,015 (RV)	± 3.2%	46%	46%	1%	1%	–	6%
TIPP Insights	September 3–5, 2024	949 (LV)	± 3.2%	48%	48%	1%	1%	–	2%
YouGov	August 23 – September 3, 2024	900 (RV)	± 4.2%	45%	47%	1%	1%	–	6%
CNN/SSRS	August 23–29, 2024	682 (LV)	± 4.7%	44%	49%	–	2%	1%	4%
Redfield & Wilton Strategies	August 25–28, 2024	530 (LV)	–	45%	46%	–	1%	1%	7%
Bloomberg/Morning Consult	August 23–26, 2024	776 (LV)	± 4.0%	49%	47%	–	0%	2%	2%
Bloomberg/Morning Consult	August 23–26, 2024	758 (RV)	± 3.0%	49%	47%	–	0%	2%	2%
Fox News	August 23–26, 2024	1,014 (RV)	± 3.0%	48%	47%	1%	1%	2%	1%

Hypothetical polling with Robert F. Kennedy Jr.

Kamala Harris vs. Donald Trump vs. Robert F. Kennedy Jr. vs. Cornel West vs. Jill Stein vs. Chase Oliver

Poll source	Date(s) administered	Sample size	Margin of error	Kamala Harris Democratic	Donald Trump Republican	Robert F. Kennedy Jr. Independent	Cornel West Independent	Jill Stein Green	Chase Oliver Libertarian	Other / Undecided
The Wall Street Journal	September 28 – October 8, 2024	600 (RV)	± 5.0%	47%	45%	0%	0%	1%	1%	6%
Global Strategy Group (D)/North Star Opinion Research (R)	September 23–29, 2024	400 (LV)	± 4.9%	47%	47%	0%	0%	2%	1%	3%
	August 23, 2024	Robert F. Kennedy, Jr. suspends his presidential campaign and endorses Donald Trump.								
Spry Strategies (R)	August 14–20, 2024	600 (LV)	± 4.0%	46%	46%	2%	–	1%	–	5%
Rasmussen Reports (R)	August 13–17, 2024	1,187 (LV)	–	44%	45%	7%	1%	0%	–	3%
Focaldata	August 6–16, 2024	702 (LV)	± 3.7%	45%	46%	7%	–	0%	0%	2%
Focaldata	August 6–16, 2024	702 (RV)	± 3.7%	45%	45%	9%	–	0%	0%	1%
Focaldata	August 6–16, 2024	702 (A)	± 3.7%	42%	46%	9%	–	0%	0%	3%
Redfield & Wilton Strategies	August 12–15, 2024	592 (LV)	–	43%	44%	5%	–	1%	1%	6%
The New York Times/Siena College	August 8–15, 2024	677 (RV)	± 4.4%	45%	42%	6%	0%	1%	2%	4%
The New York Times/Siena College	August 8–15, 2024	677 (LV)	± 4.4%	47%	43%	5%	0%	0%	1%	4%
Navigator Research (D)	July 31 – August 8, 2024	600 (LV)	± 4.0%	45%	46%	5%	0%	0%	0%	4%
Cook Political Report/BSG (R)/GS Strategy Group (D)	July 26 – August 8, 2024	435 (LV)	–	46%	42%	7%	1%	0%	4%	
Redfield & Wilton Strategies	July 31 – August 3, 2024	567 (LV)	–	44%	43%	4%	–	0%	0%	9%
Bloomberg/Morning Consult	July 24–28, 2024	804 (RV)	± 3.0%	48%	44%	5%	–	0%	2%	1%
Redfield & Wilton Strategies	July 22–24, 2024	510 (LV)	–	43%	46%	4%	–	0%	1%	6%
Emerson College	July 22–23, 2024	800 (RV)	± 3.4%	40%	48%	5%	1%	1%	1%	4%

Kamala Harris vs. Donald Trump vs. Robert F. Kennedy Jr. vs. Jill Stein

Poll source	Date(s) administered	Sample size	Margin of error	Kamala Harris Democratic	Donald Trump Republican	Robert F. Kennedy Jr. Independent	Jill Stein Green	Other / Undecided
	August 23, 2024	Robert F. Kennedy, Jr. suspends his presidential campaign and endorses Donald Trump.						
Public Policy Polling (D) (Note: Poll conducted for Clean and Prosperous America PAC)	July 17–20, 2024	738 (RV)	± 3.6%	40%	46%	7%	1%	6%

Kamala Harris vs. Donald Trump vs. Robert F. Kennedy Jr.

Poll source	Date(s) administered	Sample size	Margin of error	Kamala Harris Democratic	Donald Trump Republican	Robert F. Kennedy Jr. Independent	Other / Undecided
	August 23, 2024	Robert F. Kennedy, Jr. suspends his presidential campaign and endorses Donald Trump.					
Peak Insights (R) (Note: Poll commissioned by the National Republican Senatorial Committee)	July 31 – August 5, 2024	800 (LV)	± 3.0%	42%	44%	11%	3%

Hypothetical polling with Joe Biden and Donald Trump

Joe Biden vs. Donald Trump

Poll source	Date(s) administered	Sample size	Margin of error	Joe Biden Democratic	Donald Trump Republican	Other / Undecided
	July 21, 2024	Joe Biden withdraws from the race.				
Public Policy Polling (D)	July 17–20, 2024	738 (RV)	± 3.6%	44%	50%	6%
InsiderAdvantage (R)	July 15–16, 2024	800 (LV)	± 3.5%	44%	49%	7%
Emerson College (Note: Poll sponsored by Democrats for the Next Generation PAC)	July 15–16, 2024	1,000 (RV)	± 3.0%	40%	47%	13%
Rasmussen Reports (R) (Note: Poll sponsored by The Heartland Institute)	July 5–12, 2024	1,101 (LV)	± 3.0%	41%	50%	9%
Public Policy Polling (D)	July 10–11, 2024	596 (RV)	–	43%	51%	6%
Echelon Insights (Note: Poll sponsored by NetChoice)	July 1–8, 2024	601 (LV)	± 5.0%	44%	48%	8%
Bloomberg/Morning Consult	July 1–5, 2024	781 (RV)	± 4.0%	45%	48%	7%
Emerson College	June 30 – July 2, 2024	1,000 (RV)	± 3.0%	42%	46%	12%
North Star Opinion Research (R)	June 17–20, 2024	600 (LV)	± 4.0%	42%	48%	10%
Emerson College	June 13–18, 2024	1,000 (RV)	± 3.0%	43%	47%	10%
Emerson College	June 13–18, 2024	1,000 (RV)	± 3.0%	48%	52%	–
Rasmussen Reports (R)	June 11–13, 2024	750 (RV)	± 4.0%	40%	47%	13%
Fox News	June 1–4, 2024	1,095 (RV)	± 3.0%	46%	51%	3%
Fabrizio Ward (R)/Impact Research (D) (Note: Poll commissioned by AARP)	May 28 – June 4, 2024	600 (LV)	± 4.0%	44%	50%	6%
Mainstreet Research/Florida Atlantic University	May 19–21, 2024	609 (RV)	± 4.0%	41%	41%	18%
Mainstreet Research/Florida Atlantic University	May 19–21, 2024	501 (LV)	± 4.0%	45%	43%	12%
CBS News/YouGov	May 10–16, 2024	1,214 (RV)	± 3.5%	47%	52%	1%
Prime Group (Note: Poll sponsored by Citizens to Save Our Republic PAC, which opposes Trump and third party candidates)	May 9–16, 2024	490 (RV)	–	49%	51%	–
Noble Predictive Insights	May 7–14, 2024	1,003 (RV)	± 3.1%	41%	44%	15%
Bloomberg/Morning Consult	May 7–13, 2024	795 (RV)	± 3.0%	44%	49%	7%
Cook Political Report/BSG (R)/GS Strategy Group (D)	May 6–13, 2024	527 (LV)	± 4.3%	44%	45%	11%
The New York Times/Siena College	April 28 – May 9, 2024	626 (RV)	± 4.0%	42%	49%	9%
The New York Times/Siena College	April 28 – May 9, 2024	626 (LV)	± 4.0%	43%	49%	8%
Emerson College	April 25–29, 2024	1,000 (RV)	± 3.0%	44%	48%	8%
Emerson College	April 25–29, 2024	1,000 (RV)	± 3.0%	48%	52%	–
Kaplan Strategies	April 20–21, 2024	874 (RV)	± 3.3%	43%	47%	10%
John Zogby Strategies (Note: Poll conducted for Kennedy's campaign)	April 13–21, 2024	630 (LV)	–	40%	51%	9%
Bloomberg/Morning Consult	April 8–15, 2024	801 (RV)	± 3.0%	42%	49%	9%
Fabrizio, Lee & Associates (R)	April 7–11, 2024	400 (LV)	± 4.9%	44%	48%	8%
The Bullfinch Group (Note: Poll sponsored by Independent Center)	March 29 – April 3, 2024	600 (RV)	± 4.0%	38%	44%	18% (Note: Independent/Third party candidate with 13%)
RABA Research	March 28–31, 2024	503 (RV)	± 4.4%	36%	39%	25% (Note: "Someone else" with 15%)
The Wall Street Journal	March 17–24, 2024	600 (RV)	± 4.0%	42%	47%	11%
Echelon Insights (Note: Poll sponsored by The Heritage Foundation)	March 12–19, 2024	401 (LV)	± 5.7%	45%	51%	4%
North Star Opinion Research (R) (Note: Poll sponsored by League of American Workers)	March 14–17, 2024	600 (LV)	± 4.0%	42%	46%	12%
Emerson College	March 12–15, 2024	1,000 (RV)	± 3.0%	44%	48%	8%
Emerson College	March 12–15, 2024	1,000 (RV)	± 3.0%	48%	52%	–
Bloomberg/Morning Consult	March 8–14, 2024	796 (RV)	± 3.0%	43%	48%	9%
Fox News	March 7–11, 2024	1,121 (RV)	± 3.0%	45%	49%	6%
Rasmussen Reports (R)	February 21–26, 2024	1,001 (RV)	± 3.0%	40%	47%	13%
Bloomberg/Morning Consult	February 12–20, 2024	798 (RV)	± 3.0%	43%	49%	8%
Emerson College	February 16–19, 2024	1,000 (RV)	± 3.0%	43%	46%	11%
J.L. Partners	January 29 – February 1, 2024	500 (RV)	± 4.4%	41%	45%	14%
Focaldata	January 17–23, 2024	783 (A)	–	39%	43%	18% (Note: "Another candidate" with 12%)
Focaldata	January 17–23, 2024	– (LV)	–	41%	45%	14% (Note: "Another candidate" with 11%)
Focaldata	January 17–23, 2024	– (LV)	–	50%	50%	–
Bloomberg/Morning Consult	January 16–21, 2024	800 (RV)	± 3.0%	44%	47%	9%
The Bullfinch Group	December 14–18, 2023	600 (RV)	± 4.0%	40%	50%	10%
VCreek/AMG (R) (Note: Poll sponsored by Americas PAC)	December 1–8, 2023	694 (RV)	–	41%	46%	13%
Bloomberg/Morning Consult	November 27 – December 6, 2023	796 (RV)	± 3.0%	42%	46%	12%
J.L. Partners (Note: Poll conducted for The Daily Mail)	November 27 – December 1, 2023	550 (LV)	± 4.4%	43%	48%	9%
Tulchin Research (D) (Note: Poll sponsored by Stand for Children Arizona)	November 13–20, 2023	800 (LV)	± 3.5%	42%	42%	16%
Bloomberg/Morning Consult	October 30 – November 7, 2023	800 (RV)	± 3.0%	42%	46%	12%
Emerson College	October 30 – November 4, 2023	1,000 (RV)	± 3.0%	41%	43%	16%
The New York Times/Siena College	October 22 – November 3, 2023	603 (RV)	± 4.4%	44%	49%	7%
The New York Times/Siena College	October 22 – November 3, 2023	603 (LV)	± 4.4%	44%	49%	7%
Noble Predictive Insights	October 25–31, 2023	1,010 (RV)	± 3.1%	38%	46%	16%
Bloomberg/Morning Consult	October 5–10, 2023	804 (RV)	± 3.0%	43%	47%	10%
Redfield & Wilton Strategies	October 7–9, 2023	627 (RV)	–	39%	44%	16%
Emerson College	August 2–4, 2023	1,337 (RV)	± 2.6%	43%	45%	13%
Public Opinion Strategies (R) (Note: Poll conducted for the Citizen Awareness Project)	July 22–24, 2023	500 (RV)	± 4.4%	45%	44%	8%
Prime Group	June 14–28, 2023	500 (RV)	–	48%	52%	–
Prime Group	June 14–28, 2023	500 (RV)	–	31%	41%	28% (Note: No Labels candidate)
Public Opinion Strategies (R)	June 17–19, 2023	500 (RV)	± 4.4%	44%	41%	11%
Public Opinion Strategies (R)	May 15–17, 2023	500 (RV)	± 4.4%	46%	44%	10%
Public Opinion Strategies (R)	April 11–13, 2023	500 (RV)	± 4.4%	45%	44%	11%
Rasmussen Reports (R) (Note: Poll sponsored by College Republicans United)	March 13–14, 2023	1,001 (LV)	± 3.0%	39%	50%	11%
OH Predictive Insights	January 31 – February 9, 2023	1,000 (RV)	± 3.1%	39%	37%	24%
Blueprint Polling (D)	January 5–8, 2023	618 (V)	± 3.9%	35%	38%	27%
Rasmussen Reports (R)	November 8–9, 2022	874 (LV)	± 3.0%	47%	45%	8%
Targoz Market Research	November 2–6, 2022	560 (LV)	± 4.1%	45%	53%	2%
Emerson College	October 30 – November 1, 2022	1,000 (LV)	± 3.0%	42%	46%	12%
Emerson College	September 6–7, 2022	627 (LV)	± 3.9%	41%	44%	15%
Echelon Insights	August 31 – September 7, 2022	773 (LV)	± 4.5%	43%	47%	10%
Blueprint Polling (D)	May 12–16, 2022	608 (LV)	± 4.0%	41%	41%	18%
Fabrizio, Lee & Associates (R)	November 11–16, 2021	600 (LV)	± 4.0%	43%	51%	6%
Bendixen/Amandi International	June 17–23, 2021	600 (LV)	± 4.0%	51%	44%	5%

Joe Biden vs. Donald Trump vs. Robert F. Kennedy Jr. vs. Cornel West vs. Jill Stein

Poll source	Date(s) administered	Sample size	Margin of error	Joe Biden Democratic	Donald Trump Republican	Robert F. Kennedy Jr. Independent	Cornel West Independent	Jill Stein Green	Other / Undecided
	July 21, 2024	Joe Biden withdraws from the race.							
Public Policy Polling (D)	July 17–20, 2024	738 (RV)	± 3.6%	40%	45%	7%	–	2%	6%
Redfield & Wilton Strategies	July 16–18, 2024	456 (LV)	–	40%	44%	7%	–	1%	8% (Note: Chase Oliver (L) with 1%)
Emerson College	July 15–16, 2024	1,000 (RV)	± 3.0%	36%	46%	6%	1%	1%	10%
Rasmussen Reports (R)	July 5–12, 2024	1,101 (LV)	± 3.0%	37%	46%	9%	1%	1%	6%
YouGov	July 4–12, 2024	900 (RV)	± 3.9%	37%	44%	5%	1%	2%	11%
J.L. Partners	July 10–11, 2024	513 (LV)	± 4.3%	40%	46%	4%	–	2%	8%
Redfield & Wilton Strategies	July 8–10, 2024	419 (LV)	–	39%	43%	7%	–	1%	10% (Note: Chase Oliver (L) with 0%)
Echelon Insights	July 1–8, 2024	601 (LV)	± 5.0%	39%	41%	11%	1%	0%	8%
Bloomberg/Morning Consult	July 1–5, 2024	781 (RV)	± 4.0%	38%	45%	9%	1%	0%	7%
North Star Opinion Research (R)	June 17–20, 2024	600 (LV)	± 4.0%	32%	42%	13%	–	3%	10% (Note: Chase Oliver (L) with 2%)
Emerson College	June 13–18, 2024	1,000 (RV)	± 3.0%	39%	43%	8%	1%	1%	8%
Rasmussen Reports (R)	June 11–13, 2024	750 (RV)	± 4.0%	37%	41%	10%	2%	1%	9%
Redfield & Wilton Strategies	June 8–11, 2024	430 (LV)	–	38%	40%	6%	–	1%	15%
Fox News	June 1–4, 2024	1,095 (RV)	± 3.0%	41%	46%	8%	1%	1%	3%
Fabrizio Ward (R)/Impact Research (D) (Note: Poll commissioned by AARP)	May 28 – June 4, 2024	600 (LV)	± 4.0%	37%	45%	11%	0%	3%	4%
Prime Group	May 9–16, 2024	490 (RV)	–	40%	44%	11%	3%	2%	–
Noble Predictive Insights	May 7–14, 2024	1,003 (RV)	± 3.1%	36%	43%	8%	1%	2%	10%
Bloomberg/Morning Consult	May 7–13, 2024	795 (RV)	± 3.0%	40%	45%	7%	1%	2%	5%
Cook Political Report/BSG (R)/GS Strategy Group (D)	May 6–13, 2024	527 (LV)	± 4.3%	37%	41%	10%	2%	1%	9%
The New York Times/Siena College	April 28 – May 9, 2024	626 (RV)	± 4.0%	33%	42%	10%	0%	2%	13%
The New York Times/Siena College	April 28 – May 9, 2024	626 (LV)	± 4.0%	35%	44%	8%	0%	2%	11%
Emerson College	April 25–29, 2024	1,000 (RV)	± 3.0%	40%	44%	9%	1%	1%	6%
Bloomberg/Morning Consult	April 8–15, 2024	801 (RV)	± 3.0%	40%	46%	7%	2%	0%	5%
Fabrizio, Lee & Associates (R)	April 7–11, 2024	400 (LV)	± 4.9%	37%	42%	10%	–	2%	9%
The Wall Street Journal	March 17–24, 2024	600 (RV)	± 4.0%	34%	39%	13%	2%	1%	11% (Note: Lars Mapstead (L) with 3%)
Emerson College	March 12–15, 2024	1,000 (RV)	± 3.0%	38%	46%	7%	1%	2%	6%
Bloomberg/Morning Consult	March 8–14, 2024	796 (RV)	± 3.0%	37%	43%	12%	2%	1%	5%
Fox News	March 7–11, 2024	1,121 (RV)	± 3.0%	39%	43%	10%	1%	2%	5%
Bloomberg/Morning Consult	February 12–20, 2024	798 (RV)	± 3.0%	36%	45%	9%	1%	1%	8%
Emerson College	February 16–19, 2024	1,000 (RV)	± 3.0%	37%	43%	8%	1%	1%	10%
Bloomberg/Morning Consult	January 16–21, 2024	800 (RV)	± 3.0%	35%	43%	10%	1%	1%	10%
VCreek/AMG (R)	December 1–8, 2023	694 (RV)	–	32%	40%	9%	3%	2%	14% (Note: Joe Manchin with 4%)
Bloomberg/Morning Consult	November 27 – December 6, 2023	796 (RV)	± 3.0%	37%	40%	10%	1%	1%	11%
J.L. Partners	November 27 – December 1, 2023	550 (LV)	± 4.2%	39%	44%	5%	1%	0%	12% (Note: "Someone else" with 12%)

Joe Biden vs. Donald Trump vs. Robert F. Kennedy Jr.

Poll source	Date(s) administered	Sample size	Margin of error	Joe Biden Democratic	Donald Trump Republican	Robert F. Kennedy Jr. Independent	Other / Undecided
	July 21, 2024	Joe Biden withdraws from the race.					
1983 Labs	June 28–30, 2024	492 (LV)	± 4.4%	33%	48%	8%	11% (Note: Chase Oliver (L) with 2%)
P2 Insights (Note: Poll sponsored by Building America's Future, which supports Republican candidates)	June 11–20, 2024	650 (LV)	± 3.8%	36%	47%	7%	10%
Mainstreet Research/Florida Atlantic University	May 19–21, 2024	609 (RV)	± 4.0%	37%	39%	9%	15%
Mainstreet Research/Florida Atlantic University	May 19–21, 2024	501 (LV)	± 4.0%	39%	43%	7%	11%
P2 Insights	May 13–21, 2024	650 (LV)	± 3.8%	38%	41%	9%	12%
Redfield & Wilton Strategies	May 2–4, 2024	625 (LV)	–	42%	44%	7%	7% (Note: Jill Stein (G) with 2%)
Data Orbital	April 27–29, 2024	550 (LV)	± 4.3%	38.8%	38.1%	13.5%	9.6%
Redfield & Wilton Strategies	March 14–17, 2024	516 (LV)	–	41%	44%	7%	8%
Redfield & Wilton Strategies	December 28–30, 2023	808 (LV)	–	35%	41%	10%	14%
VCreek/AMG (R)	December 1–8, 2023	694 (RV)	–	35%	40%	16%	9%
Redfield & Wilton Strategies	November 27–29, 2023	1,103 (LV)	–	33%	40%	10%	17%
The New York Times/Siena College	October 22 – November 3, 2023	603 (RV)	± 4.4%	33%	33%	26%	8%
The New York Times/Siena College	October 22 – November 3, 2023	603 (LV)	± 4.4%	34%	34%	24%	8%
Redfield & Wilton Strategies	October 7–9, 2023	627 (LV)	–	37%	42%	8%	12%

Joe Biden vs. Donald Trump vs. Robert F. Kennedy Jr. vs. Cornel West

Poll source	Date(s) administered	Sample size	Margin of error	Joe Biden Democratic	Donald Trump Republican	Robert Kennedy Jr Independent	Cornel West Independent	Other / Undecided
	July 21, 2024	Joe Biden withdraws from the race.						
North Star Opinion Research	March 14–17, 2024	600 (LV)	± 4.0%	33%	37%	18%	2%	10%
J.L. Partners	November 27 – December 1, 2023	550 (LV)	± 4.4%	34%	39%	4%	1%	22%
Bloomberg/Morning Consult	October 30 – November 7, 2023	800 (RV)	± 3.0%	36%	40%	11%	1%	12%

Joe Biden vs. Donald Trump vs. Cornel West

Poll source	Date(s) administered	Sample size	Margin of error	Joe Biden Democratic	Donald Trump Republican	Cornel West Green	Other / Undecided
	July 21, 2024	Joe Biden withdraws from the race.					
Emerson College	August 2–4, 2023	1,337 (RV)	± 2.6%	41%	42%	4%	13%

Hypothetical polling with other candidates

Joe Biden vs. Robert F. Kennedy Jr.

Poll source	Date(s) administered	Sample size	Margin of error	Joe Biden Democratic	Robert F. Kennedy Jr. Independent	Other / Undecided
John Zogby Strategies	April 13–21, 2024	630 (LV)	–	34%	52%	14%

Robert F. Kennedy Jr. vs. Donald Trump

Poll source	Date(s) administered	Sample size	Margin of error	Robert F. Kennedy Jr. Independent	Donald Trump Republican	Other / Undecided
John Zogby Strategies	April 13–21, 2024	630 (LV)	–	39%	46%	15%

Gavin Newsom vs. Donald Trump

Poll source	Date(s) administered	Sample size	Margin of error	Gavin Newsom Democratic	Donald Trump Republican	Other / Undecided
Public Policy Polling (D)	July 10–11, 2024	596 (RV)	–	44%	51%	5%
Emerson College	February 16–19, 2024	1,000 (RV)	± 3.0%	34%	47%	19%

Gretchen Whitmer vs. Donald Trump

Poll source	Date(s) administered	Sample size	Margin of error	Gretchen Whitmer Democratic	Donald Trump Republican	Other / Undecided
Public Policy Polling (D)	July 10–11, 2024	596 (RV)	–	45%	49%	6%

JB Pritzker vs. Donald Trump

Poll source	Date(s) administered	Sample size	Margin of error	JB Pritzker Democratic	Donald Trump Republican	Other / Undecided
Public Policy Polling (D)	July 10–11, 2024	596 (RV)	–	41%	47%	12%

Josh Shapiro vs. Donald Trump

Poll source	Date(s) administered	Sample size	Margin of error	Josh Shapiro Democratic	Donald Trump Republican	Other / Undecided
Public Policy Polling (D)	July 10–11, 2024	596 (RV)	–	43%	46%	11%

Pete Buttigieg vs. Donald Trump

Poll source	Date(s) administered	Sample size	Margin of error	Pete Buttigieg Democratic	Donald Trump Republican	Other / Undecided
Public Policy Polling (D)	July 10–11, 2024	596 (RV)	–	46%	49%	5%

Mark Kelly vs. Donald Trump vs. Robert F. Kennedy Jr. vs. Jill Stein

Poll source	Date(s) administered	Sample size	Margin of error	Mark Kelly Democratic	Donald Trump Republican	Robert F. Kennedy Jr. Independent	Jill Stein Green	Other / Undecided
Public Policy Polling (D)	July 17–20, 2024	738 (RV)	± 3.6%	43%	45%	6%	1%	5%

Joe Biden vs. Nikki Haley vs. Robert F. Kennedy Jr.

Poll source	Date(s) administered	Sample size	Margin of error	Joe Biden Democratic	Nikki Haley Republican	Robert F. Kennedy Jr. Independent	Other / Undecided
Redfield & Wilton Strategies	November 27–29, 2023	1,103 (LV)	–	33%	25%	19%	23% (Note: "Other (L)" & "Other (G)" with 1%; "Other (Third Party/Write-In)" & "Would not vote" with 2%)

Joe Biden vs. Nikki Haley

Poll source	Date(s) administered	Sample size	Margin of error	Joe Biden Democratic	Nikki Haley Republican	Other / Undecided
VCreek/AMG (R)	December 1–8, 2023	694 (RV)	–	30%	37%	33%
The New York Times/Siena College	October 22 – November 3, 2023	603 (RV)	± 4.4%	38%	45%	17%
The New York Times/Siena College	October 22 – November 3, 2023	603 (LV)	± 4.4%	37%	46%	17%

Joe Biden vs. Ron DeSantis vs. Robert F. Kennedy Jr.

Poll source	Date(s) administered	Sample size	Margin of error	Joe Biden Democratic	Ron DeSantis Republican	Robert F. Kennedy Jr. Independent	Other / Undecided
Redfield & Wilton Strategies	November 27–29, 2023	1,103 (LV)	–	34%	27%	17%	22% (Note: "Other (L)" & "Other (G)" with 1%; "Other (Third Party/Write-In)" & "Would not vote" with 2%)

Joe Biden vs. Ron DeSantis

Poll source	Date(s) administered	Sample size	Margin of error	Joe Biden Democratic	Ron DeSantis Republican	Other / Undecided
The New York Times/Siena College	October 22 – November 3, 2023	603 (RV)	± 4.4%	41%	46%	13%
The New York Times/Siena College	October 22 – November 3, 2023	603 (LV)	± 4.4%	42%	46%	12%
Noble Predictive Insights	October 25 – 31, 2023	1,010 (RV)	± 3.1%	37%	40%	23%
Public Opinion Strategies (R)	July 22–24, 2023	500 (RV)	± 4.4%	39%	46%	12%
Public Opinion Strategies (R)	June 17–19, 2023	500 (RV)	± 4.4%	40%	46%	12%
Public Opinion Strategies (R)	May 15–17, 2023	500 (RV)	± 4.4%	43%	47%	10%
Public Opinion Strategies (R)	April 11–13, 2023	500 (RV)	± 4.4%	42%	48%	10%
OH Predictive Insights	January 31 – February 9, 2023	1,000 (RV)	± 3.1%	35%	36%	29%
Blueprint Polling (D)	January 5–8, 2023	618 (V)	± 3.9%	37%	43%	20%
Echelon Insights	August 31 – September 7, 2022	773 (LV)	± 4.5%	43%	43%	14%

Joe Biden vs. Mike Pence

Poll source	Date(s) administered	Sample size	Margin of error	Joe Biden Democratic	Mike Pence Republican	Other / Undecided
Public Opinion Strategies (R)	May 15–17, 2023	500 (RV)	± 4.4%	45%	43%	12%

=== Results ===
State House district results: Trump 40–50% 50–60% 60–70% 70–80% / Harris 50–60% 60–70% 70–80%

2024 United States presidential election in Arizona
Party	Candidate	Votes	%	±%
Republican	Donald Trump; JD Vance	1,770,242	52.22%	▲3.16%
Democratic	Kamala Harris; Tim Walz	1,582,860	46.69%	▼2.67%
Green	Jill Stein; Butch Ware	18,319	0.54%	▲0.49%
Libertarian	Chase Oliver; Mike ter Maat	17,898	0.53%	▼0.99%
Socialism and Liberation	Claudia De la Cruz (write-in) Karina Garcia (write-in)	689	0.02%	▲0.01%
Independent	Shiva Ayyadurai (write-in) Crystal Ellis (write-in)	77	0.00%	N/A
Constitution	Joel Skousen (Note: The Constitution Party did not have ballot access in Arizona. Joel Skousen and Rik Combs registered as write-in candidates representing the party instead of the national ticket led by Randall Terry and Stephen Broden.) (write-in) Rik Combs (write-in)	53	0.00%	Steady
Write-in		23	0.00%	N/A
Total votes		3,390,161	100.00%	N/A

==== By county ====
County	Donald Trump Republican		Kamala Harris Democratic		Various candidates Other parties		Margin		Total
County	#	%	#	%	#	%	#	%	Total
Apache	12,795	39.96%	18,872	58.93%	356	1.11%	-6,077	-18.98%	32,023
Cochise	35,936	60.98%	22,296	37.83%	703	1.19%	13,640	23.14%	58,935
Coconino	27,576	39.34%	41,504	59.21%	1,016	1.45%	-13,928	-19.87%	70,096
Gila	18,901	68.36%	8,504	30.76%	243	0.88%	10,397	37.60%	27,648
Graham	11,177	73.62%	3,867	25.47%	139	0.92%	7,310	48.15%	15,183
Greenlee	2,308	69.77%	954	28.84%	46	1.39%	1,354	40.93%	3,308
La Paz	5,470	71.73%	2,101	27.55%	55	0.72%	3,369	44.18%	7,626
Maricopa	1,051,531	51.18%	980,016	47.70%	22,868	1.11%	71,515	3.48%	2,054,415
Mohave	85,683	77.57%	24,081	21.80%	693	0.63%	61,602	55.77%	110,457
Navajo	29,480	58.13%	20,754	40.92%	481	0.95%	8,726	17.21%	50,715
Pima	214,669	41.81%	292,450	56.96%	6,317	1.23%	-77,781	-15.15%	513,436
Pinal	126,926	60.57%	80,656	38.49%	1,984	0.95%	46,270	22.08%	209,566
Santa Cruz	7,699	40.25%	11,265	58.90%	162	0.85%	-3,566	-18.64%	19,126
Yavapai	99,346	66.48%	48,717	32.60%	1,365	0.91%	50,629	33.88%	149,428
Yuma	40,745	59.74%	26,823	39.33%	631	0.93%	13,922	20.41%	68,199
Totals	1,770,242	52.22%	1,582,860	46.69%	37,059	1.09%	187,382	5.53%	3,390,161

==== County that flipped from Democratic to Republican ====
- Maricopa (largest city: Phoenix)

==== By congressional district ====
Trump won six of nine congressional districts.

District	Harris	Trump	Representative elected
1st	47.97%	51.08%	David Schweikert
2nd	42.01%	56.98%	Eli Crane
3rd	69.19%	29.44%	Ruben Gallego (118th Congress)
3rd	69.19%	29.44%	Yassamin Ansari (119th Congress)
4th	52.63%	45.96%	Greg Stanton
5th	39.47%	59.45%	Andy Biggs
6th	49.08%	49.83%	Juan Ciscomani
7th	60.48%	38.35%	Raúl Grijalva
8th	41.37%	57.70%	Debbie Lesko (118th Congress)
8th	41.37%	57.70%	Abraham Hamadeh (119th Congress)
9th	34.04%	65.12%	Paul Gosar

== Analysis ==
Trump received more than 1.77 million votes, setting a new record for votes cast for any candidate in the history of statewide elections in Arizona. Trump reclaimed the largest county in the state, Maricopa, although it once again voted to the left of the state, a trend that started in 2016 and foreshadowed his 2020 loss of the state. Harris did not get over 60% of the vote in a single county. Arizona was one of three swing states, along with Michigan and Pennsylvania, where Harris received fewer raw votes than Biden in 2020. In addition, of the seven swing states, she suffered her worst raw vote drop-off compared to Biden in Arizona, winning 90,000 fewer votes. Notably, Arizona was the only state in which the Trump campaign turned over most campaign functions to well-funded outside groups such as Turning Point Action (which is headquartered in Phoenix), who focused exclusively on turning out low-propensity Republicans instead of winning over Democrats, as Republicans represent a majority of Arizona's party registration. Specifically, Turning Point significantly influenced Arizona college students, typically low-propensity voters, to support Donald Trump. A key strategy was founder Charlie Kirk’s high-profile "Prove Me Wrong" events on college campuses, where he debated students on critical issues, as thousands more watched. The Harris campaign, on the other hand, handled her campaigning in-house.

Trump's gains in Arizona were mostly powered by suburban voters returning to the Republican Party and large gains among Hispanic Americans. In Maricopa County, Arizona's largest and the only county to flip, the vast majority of precincts shifted to the right, with Trump's strongest gains coming from traditionally conservative East Valley cities that had been drifting left as well as Hispanic-majority neighborhoods in south and east Phoenix. Trump also gained in Arizona's Hispanic-majority border counties, gaining over 11% in Yuma County, which had been shifting heavily since Trump first won it in 2016. He also made gains in traditionally Democratic counties that remained in the Democratic column, such as Santa Cruz County, which trended over 9% Republican from 2020 - Trump's second largest improvement in the state. Illegal immigration was a major concern among border counties that shifted towards Trump.

Despite Harris losing the state, Democrat Ruben Gallego did win the 2024 United States Senate election in Arizona, in part due to ticket-splitting and because some Trump voters did not vote down-ballot.

=== Exit poll data ===
CNN conducted an exit poll in Arizona for both the presidential race and concurrent U.S. Senate race. They surveyed 4,612 voters across the state.

2024 presidential election in Arizona voter demographics
Demographic subgroup	Trump	Harris	% of total vote
Ideology
Liberals	4	95	21
Moderates	40	58	41
Conservatives	92	7	37
Party
Democrats	1	99	28
Republicans	93	7	34
Independents	53	44	38
Gender
Men	54	45	46
Women	50	49	54
Race
White	57	42	63
Black	N/A	N/A	4
Latino	44	54	27
Asian	N/A	N/A	2
All other races	N/A	N/A	4
Education
Never attended college	61	37	13
Some college	54	45	27
Associate degree	54	45	19
Bachelor's degree	50	49	23
Advanced degree	42	56	17
Gender by race
White men	59	40	30
White women	55	44	33
Black men	N/A	N/A	2
Black women	N/A	N/A	2
Latino men	43	55	11
Latina women	44	54	16
All other races	55	41	6
Area type
Urban	45	54	46
Suburban	57	41	49
Rural	66	34	5
Most important issue
Democracy	11	89	34
Economy	81	18	32
Abortion	23	73	12
Immigration	94	6	18
Foreign policy	N/A	N/A	4
Biden job approval
Strongly approve	0	100	15
Somewhat approve	3	95	26
Somewhat disapprove	48	50	10
Strongly disapprove	95	4	49
Abortion should be:
Legal in all cases	14	84	33
Legal in most cases	46	54	33
Illegal in most cases	96	3	26
Illegal in all cases	N/A	N/A	6
Democracy in the United States is:
Very threatened	62	36	35
Somewhat threatened	46	53	37
Somewhat secure	45	52	21
Very secure	50	50	6
First time voting?
Yes	N/A	N/A	7
No	52	47	93

== See also ==
- United States presidential elections in Arizona
- 2024 United States presidential election
- 2024 Democratic Party presidential primaries
- 2024 Republican Party presidential primaries
- 2024 United States elections
- 2024 Arizona elections

== Notes ==
Partisan clients
