= 2024 Constitution National Convention =

- April 24–27, 2024

264 delegates to the Constitution National Convention 132 votes needed to win
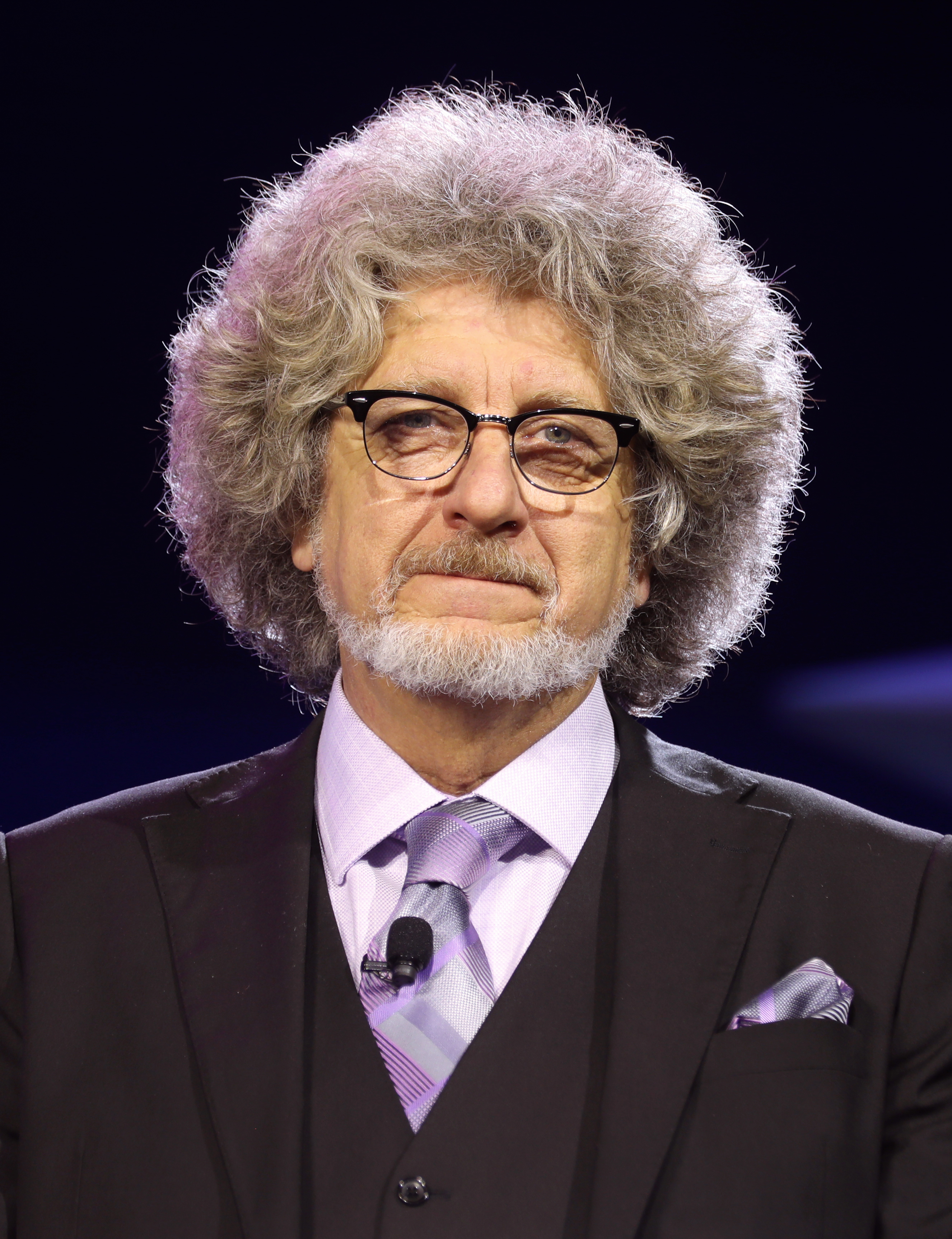

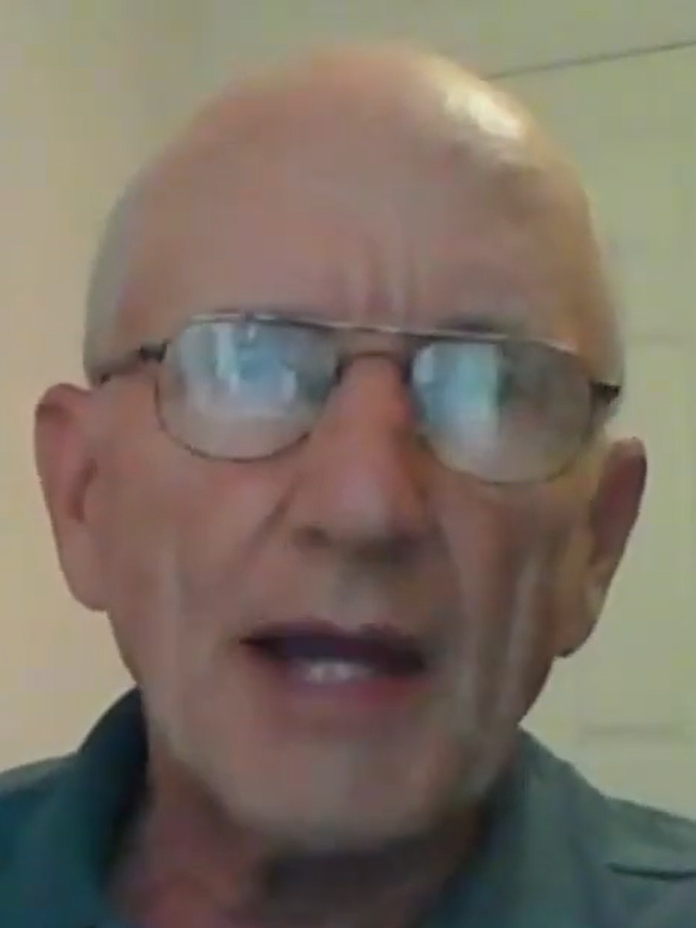

Candidate	Randall Terry	Joel Skousen	Paul Venable
Home state	Tennessee	Utah	Missouri
Delegate count	144	80	32
Percentage	54.6%	30.3%	12.1%
First place by convention roll call
Randall Terry
Joel Skousen
Paul Venable
Daniel Cummings
Previous Constitution nominee
Don Blankenship
Constitution nominee
Randall Terry

Although four states held bona fide presidential primaries for the Constitution Party's 2020 candidates, no such primaries were held in any state for the party's 2024 candidates. This page is a summary of delegation votes from the April 27 nominating convention in Salt Lake City, Utah.

Randall Terry, an anti-abortion activist and 2012 presidential candidate, won the party nomination.

Stephen Broden was nominated for vice president.

Randall Terry won the nomination by securing a majority in the first round. The votes largely broke down along geographic lines. Joel Skousen, who is from Utah, received all 61 votes from the delegations of the Four Corners states, but only 19 votes from the rest of the country combined. The only state delegations he carried outside of the region were New Hampshire and West Virginia. Paul Venable won the majority of votes from South Carolina and his home state of Missouri and Daniel Cummings won a plurality in his home state of Wyoming. The remaining ten delegations were all won by Terry.

Aside from the presidential nomination, much of the debate at the convention focused on an ultimately defeated amendment by Skousen to remove references to God from the party platform.

== Candidates ==
Eight candidates sought the nomination:

- Daniel Clyde Cummings, perennial candidate from Wyoming
- Admiral Louis C. Hook from Mississippi
- Brandon McIntyre from Georgia
- Joel Skousen, author and survivalist from Utah
- Ben Stewart
- Randall Terry, author, anti-abortion activist, and Democratic candidate for president in 2012 from Tennessee
- Samm Tittle, perennial candidate
- Paul Venable, nominee for U.S. Senate from Missouri in 2022

== Results ==
2024 Constitution Party Presidential Nomination Vote
Candidate	Votes	Percentage			
Candidate	Votes	Percentage	Randall Terry	144	54.55%
Joel Skousen	80	30.30%			
Paul Venable	32	12.12%			
Daniel Cummings	4	1.52%			
Brandon McIntyre	2	0.76%			
Samm Tittle	2	0.76%			
Louis C. Hook	0	0.00%			
Ben Stewart	0	0.00%			
Total:	264	100.00%			

Constitution Party vice presidential nomination
Candidate	Votes	Percentage		
Candidate	Votes	Percentage	Stephen Broden	Nominated via Voice Vote

== See also ==
- 2024 United States presidential election
- 2024 Republican National Convention
- 2024 Democratic National Convention
- 2024 Libertarian National Convention
- 2024 Green National Convention
