= Joel Skousen =

American survivalist and author

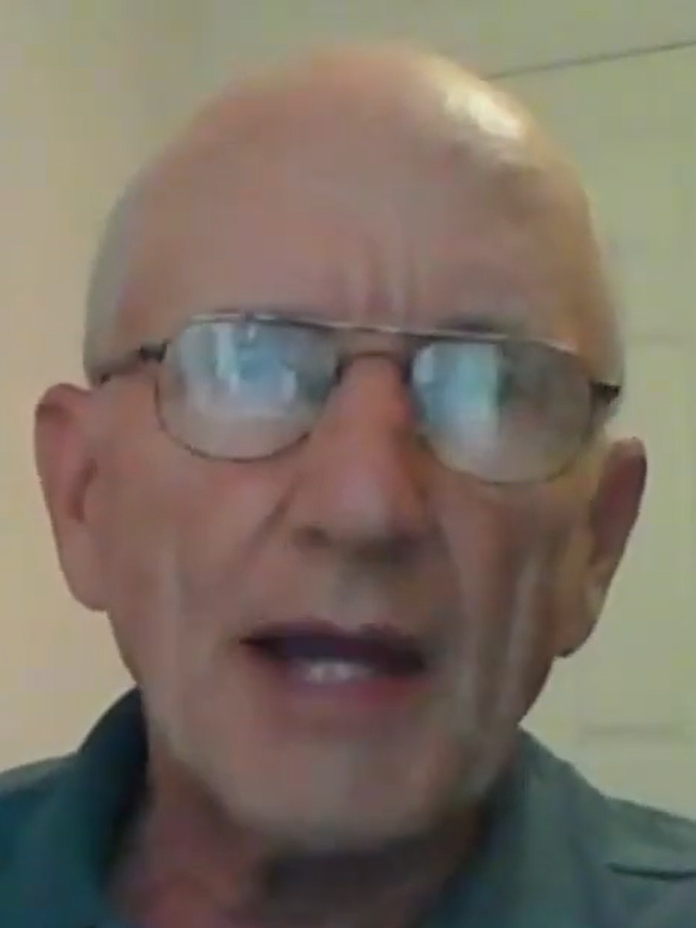
- Skousen in 2020

Personal details
- Born: September 22, 1946 (age 79) San Diego, California
- Party: Constitution
- Relatives: W. Cleon Skousen (Uncle); Mark Skousen (Brother); Royal Skousen (Brother)
- Education: Brigham Young University
- Occupation: Survivalist, Author, Consultant
- Website: www.joelskousen.com

Military service
- Allegiance: United States

Joel M. Skousen (/ˈskaʊzən/; born September 22, 1946) is an American author of books on survivalism and was a candidate in the 2024 United States presidential election for the Constitution Party.

== Biography ==
Skousen, born in San Diego and raised in Oregon, served as a USMC fighter pilot during the Vietnam War. During the 1980s, Skousen was the chairman of the Conservative National Committee. He was also the executive editor of Conservative Digest.

Skousen is the founder and chief editor of World Affairs Brief, a weekly news-analysis service. Some of Skousen's views are controversial. He made the case that the Fall of Communism was, also as claimed by KGB defector Anatoliy Golitsyn, a "carefully crafted deception," meant to gain Western aid and technology transfers that would eventually end in a resurgence of the Russian threat. In his weekly briefings, Skousen has also written extensively about the evidence of conspiracy by government to cover up its own involvement in numerous black operations such as the Assassination of John F. Kennedy, the Oklahoma City bombing, TWA 800 and the September 11 attacks. He is particularly a harsh critic of what he calls the "phony war on terror" used to conjure up justification for continual foreign intervention and the diminution of American constitutional rights; he is also very critical of globalism, communism, and the U.S. interventionist foreign policy.

Skousen has written several books. including Essential Principles for the Conservation of Liberty, Strategic Relocation – North American Guide to Safe Places, The Secure Home, Survival Home Manual: Architectural Design, Construction, and Remodeling Of Self-Sufficient Residences and Retreats, and How to Implement a High Security Shelter in the Home. He also published a booklet titled 10 Packs for Survival, which he has also posted to several websites.

Skousen designs and consults on hardened retreat homes, often including fallout shelters with HEPA air filtration systems. He has offered consultation in both North and Central America regarding architectural and retreat design. In the book Dancing at Armageddon: Survivalism and Chaos in Modern Times by Richard G. Mitchell Jr., (2001) Skousen was quoted: "'You never want to make a house look like an obvious fortress. Those who want in can always move up a bigger gun. There is no way you can design a home to withstand RPG (Rocket-propelled grenade) rockets and tanks. I design these homes so you virtually cannot tell inside or out that they are any different from a conventional home.'"

Because of its low population density and diverse economy, Skousen recommends the Intermountain West region of the United States, as a preferred region for relocation and setting up survival retreats.

In late 2007, Skousen gave his support to Ron Paul, rather than to fellow LDS church member Mitt Romney, in the 2008 U.S. presidential campaign, in a widely circulated YouTube video clip. After John McCain became the Republican Party's presumptive nominee in early 2008, Skousen also endorsed Chuck Baldwin of the Constitution Party.

He announced his candidacy for President of the United States under the Constitution Party in 2024. Skousen lost the 2024 Constitution National Convention to Randall Terry, an anti-abortion activist. Aside from the presidential nomination, much of the debate at the convention focused on an ultimately defeated amendment by Skousen to remove references to God from the party platform.

== Personal life ==
Joel Skousen is the older brother of Mark Skousen and the younger brother of Royal Skousen. The three Skousen brothers are the nephews of conservative author and commentator W. Cleon Skousen.

In March 2013, Skousen walked away with just slight injuries from the crash of his Glasair kit plane, in a forced rough field landing, following a fuel system failure. The crash landing occurred near Spanish Fork, Utah.

Skousen lives in Orem, Utah.

== Bibliography ==
- Skousen, Joel M. (1977). Survival Home Manual: Architectural Design, Construction, and Remodeling of Self-Sufficient Residences and Retreats. Hood River, Oregon: Survival Homes. OCLC 5716888.
- Skousen, Joel M. (1984). Essential Principles for the Conservation of Liberty. Madison, Ohio: J.M. Skousen. p. 75. OCLC 14979507.
- Skousen, Joel M. (1998). How to Implement a High Security Shelter in the Home. Orem, Utah: J.M. Skousen. OCLC 40694908.
- Skousen, Joel M. (1999). The Secure Home (3rd ed.). American Fork, Utah: Swift Publishing. p. 682. ISBN 1568610556. OCLC 42930398.
- Skousen, Joel M. (2010). Strategic Relocation – North American Guide to Safe Places (3rd ed.). Lehi, Utah: Swift Publishing. p. 346. ISBN 978-1568612621. OCLC 713394979.

== See also ==
- Blast shelter
- Intentional community
- Self-sufficiency
