= Randall Terry =

American politician and activist (born 1959)

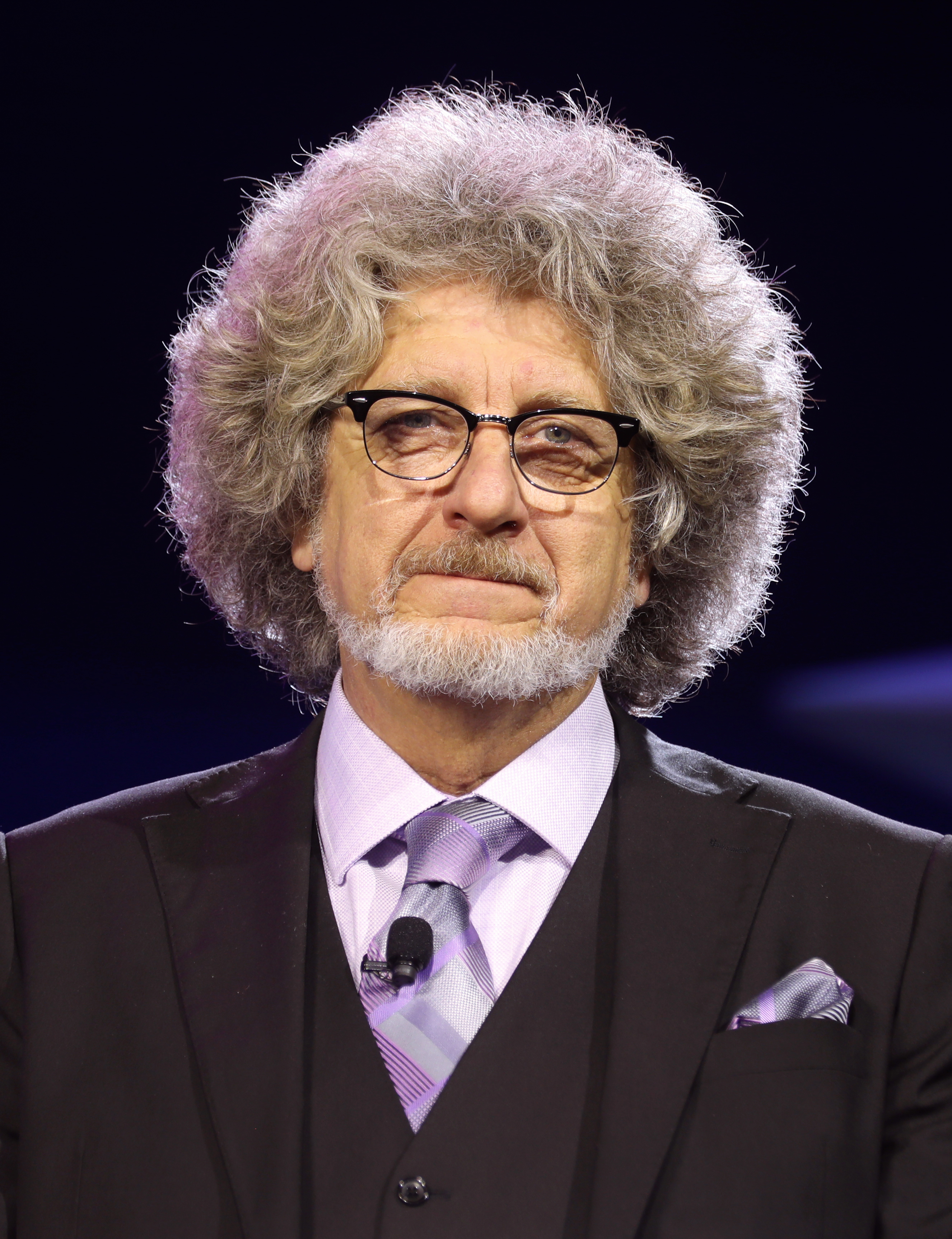
- Terry in 2024
- Born: Randall Allen Terry; April 25, 1959 (age 67); New York City, U.S.
- Education: Elim Bible Institute and College; Whitefield Theological Seminary (BA); Empire State University (BA); Norwich University (MA)
- Occupations: Politician; activist; author
- Known for: Anti-abortion activist (Operation Rescue)
- Political party: Independent (2012–2024, 2024–present)
- Other political affiliations: Republican (before 2011); Democratic (2011–2012); Constitution (2024); Right to Life (1998)
- Spouses: Cindy Dean (m. 1982; civil divorce & annulment 2000) Andrea Kollmorgen (m. 2000, civil divorce & annulment) Terrisa Bukovinac (m. 2026)
- Children: 7

Randall Allen Terry (born April 25, 1959) is an American politician, activist and author. Terry founded the anti-abortion organization Operation Rescue. Beginning in 1987, the group became particularly prominent for blockading the entrances to abortion clinics; Terry led the group until 1991. He has been arrested more than 40 times, including for violating a no-trespass order from the University of Notre Dame to protest against a visit by President Barack Obama.

In 2003, Terry founded the Society for Truth and Justice and conducted a program he called Operation Witness. In 1998, he ran for Congress in Upstate New York, and in 2006, he ran for a seat in the Florida Senate. Both times, he lost in the Republican primary.

Terry ran in the 2012 Democratic Party presidential primaries. He was the Constitution Party nominee for president of the United States in the 2024 presidential election, and his running mate was Stephen Broden.

== Career as an activist ==
In 1986, Terry was arrested for the first time for chaining himself to a sink at an abortion clinic. Terry was frequently in the news because of his activities as the leader of Operation Rescue.

Terry was named as a co-defendant in the 1994 Supreme Court case, NOW v. Scheidler, a class-action suit to compel anti-abortion leaders to compensate clinics for loss of business. Terry settled out of court with the National Organization for Women. Rather than pay the settlement, Terry promptly filed for bankruptcy, prompting Senator Charles Schumer to propose an amendment to a bankruptcy bill in Congress which would "specifically ... prevent abortion opponents from using the bankruptcy code to avoid paying court fines." The amendment was not included in the final bill. In 1998, NOW obtained more than 25,000 "frequent flyer miles" which were held by Terry in order to help satisfy a legal judgment.

In 1990, Terry helped to organize protests outside the hospital where Nancy Cruzan was a patient, around the time when her feeding tube was removed. The group Missouri Citizens for Life was also involved in the protests, along with the Rev. Patrick Mahoney, a former Operation Rescue staffer. He was also involved in protests which were related to the Terri Schiavo case. In 1994, Terry was a named defendant in Madsen v. Women's Health Center Inc. which ultimately made it all the way to the US Supreme Court. The Justices sided with Aware Woman Clinic and upheld a Buffer Zone.

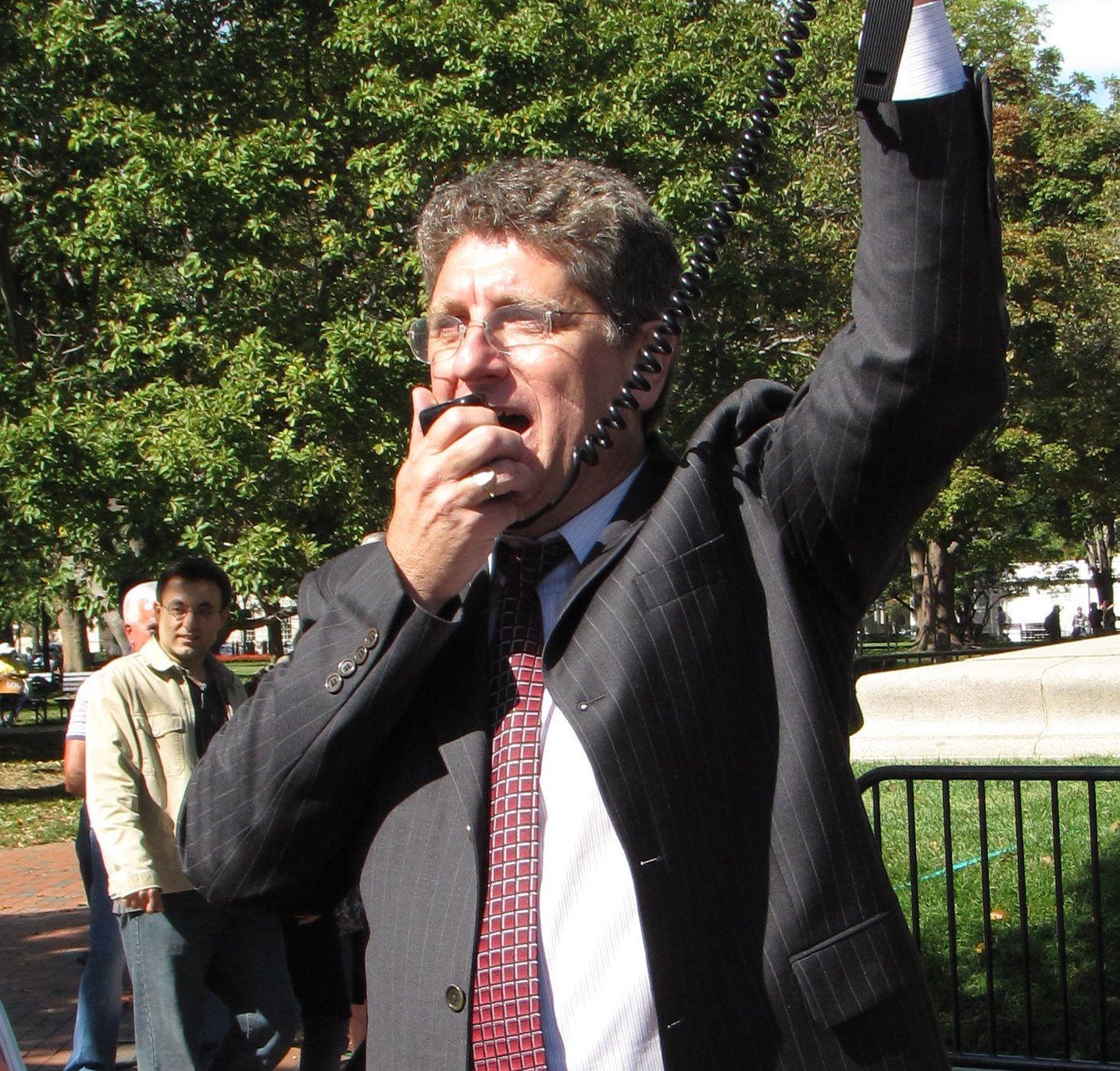
Terry counter-protesting at the National Equality March in 2009

On March 20, 2009, the White House announced that President Barack Obama was going to speak at the May 17 Commencement of the University of Notre Dame. Terry declared that Notre Dame, which is one of the foremost Catholic universities in the nation, should not have allowed Obama to speak. Terry objected to Obama's speech because Obama supports abortion rights. In an article which was published in the university's newspaper, The Observer, Terry was quoted as stating that he planned to turn the commencement into "a circus." On the Notre Dame campus on May 1, 2009, Terry was arrested for violating a no-trespassing order. He posted a bond of $250 at the St. Joseph County Jail, was released that same day, and was assigned a court date later that month. In a statement which he released to a Christian news service, Terry claimed that Notre Dame's invitation to Obama was a betrayal of Catholic teaching, comparing it to Judas' betrayal of Jesus Christ.

When Kansas obstetrician George Tiller was murdered while he was serving as an usher in his Wichita church on the morning of May 31, 2009, Terry immediately issued a statement in which he denounced Tiller. On the same day, June 1, Terry released a video in which he called president Barack Obama and pro-choice politicians "child killers", and he also stated that Tiller was a "mass murderer" who "reaped what he sowed." He voiced regret that Tiller was not able to "get things right with his maker" and he also stated that it was unfortunate that Tiller did not get a "trial of a jury of his peers and to have a proper execution." Terry's comments provoked a backlash, and Operation Rescue released a statement disavowing any connection to Terry, specifically criticizing his statement that Tiller's murder had "the potential to propel us more quickly to our goal." In an editorial, the Albany Times-Union accused Terry of undermining the credibility of the "generally peaceful" anti-abortion movement.

In 2013, Terry appeared on an episode of MTV's True Life and during his appearance on the show, he advocated the criminalization of all forms of birth control. During the course of the episode he stated, "Do we want to make the pill illegal? Yes. Do we want to make the IUD illegal? Yes. The morning after pill? Yes. The patch? Yes. Anything that's a human pesticide, they all have to be made illegal. A woman has to go to jail if she kills her baby."

Terry produces and hosts a television program titled Randall Terry: The Voice of Resistance, which airs on The Walk TV and can be seen on his website "Voice of Resistance".

== Political campaigns ==
=== 1998 congressional campaign ===
In 1998, Terry ran for the United States House of Representatives in Upstate New York. Terry competed with radio station owner William "Bud" Walker for the Republican nomination to face Democratic incumbent Maurice Hinchey. Terry received the endorsement of Focus on the Family head James Dobson; however, national and state Republicans were not supportive of Terry's candidacy. Terry was defeated by Walker 53% to 35%, but he was the Right to Life Party's nominee in the general election. Terry came in third place, winning 7% of the vote, with Hinchey and Walker winning 62% and 31% respectively. In 2000, Terry and his son Jamiel promoted the candidacy of Steve Forbes in the Republican presidential primary.

=== 2006 state senate campaign ===
In June 2005, Terry announced plans to run in the primary against Florida Republican state senator James E. King, citing King's attempt to block legislation which would have kept Terri Schiavo alive. In August 2006, in an attempt to undermine King's support in a Republican primary the next month, Terry publicized an endorsement of King by "Bill Clinton" — actually, robo-calls by a professional impersonator of former president Bill Clinton. The two "Clinton" scripts each contained a disclaimer. One was, "Hello friend, Bill Clinton here – not really!" The other was "This is a celebrity impersonation." Terry used the scripts and the impersonator in 43,000 calls. The "no amnesty" line was a reference to immigration reform proposals which were an issue in many campaigns in 2006. On September 5, 2006, Terry was defeated in the primary, with King receiving over two-thirds of the votes which were cast.

=== 2012 presidential candidacy ===
Randall Terry for President Campaign Committee
- Campaign: 2012 United States presidential election
- Candidate: Randall Terry
- Affiliation: Democratic Party
- Headquarters: 101 Cantwell Court PO Box 408, Purgitsville, WV 26852
- Key people: Mario G. Paveglio treasurer
- Receipts: US$28,043 (September 5, 2014)

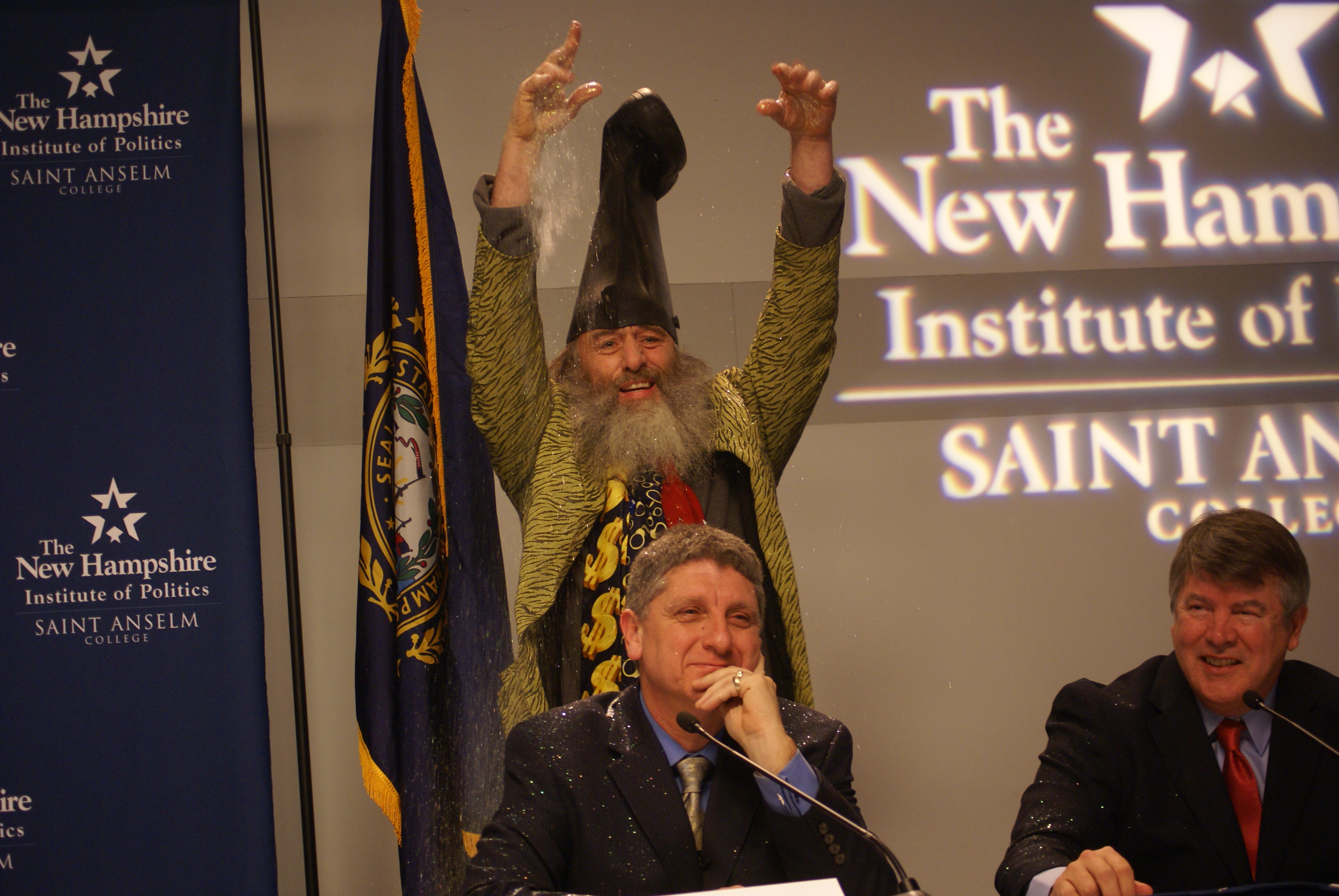
Vermin Supreme glitter bombs Terry at the Lesser-Known Candidates Forum

Map of second-place candidates in the 2012 Democratic presidential primaries Legend: Keith Russell Judd Ron Paul Darcy Richardson John Wolfe Jr. Randall Terry Uncommitted/other No second-place finisher No primary held/ no info available

In January 2011, Terry announced his intention to challenge President Barack Obama in the Democratic Party primaries for the presidential election of 2012. His campaign strategy was based upon a commercial during Super Bowl XLVI featuring graphic photographs of aborted fetuses; historically, the networks have refused all political and issue-related advertising during the Super Bowl, citing equal-time rules, and the advertisement did not air.

The attempt to air the ads led to legal action and a statement by the Democratic National Committee that Terry was not a legitimate candidate, and thus should be forbidden privileges given others running.

In December 2011, he became the physical target of candidate Vermin Supreme, who sprinkled glitter over his head during a debate, claiming he was "turning Randall Terry gay."

Terry received 18% of the vote in the 2012 Democratic Oklahoma presidential primary. He also won 12 counties in the state, including the entire panhandle, and was awarded two delegates in the Democratic primary. Kansas TV station KDGL-LD channel 23, is an independent TV station serving Southwest Kansas and the Oklahoma Panhandle. It and its sister stations carry Randall's Walk TV program, broadcasting the length of the Panhandle. It was the only primary in which Terry won any counties or delegates. He had also appeared on the ballots in Alaska, Missouri, and New Hampshire. He received 22,858 votes or 0.3% in the Democratic primary.

==== Campaign finances ====
Detailed below are the FEC-filed finances of Randall Terry for President Campaign Committee as of September 5, 2014

Receipts
Financial Source	Amount (USD)
Itemized Individual Contributions	10,012
Unitemized Individual Contributions	13,006
Total Contributions	23,018
Offsets to Operating Expenditures	5,025
Total Offsets	5,025
Total Receipts	28,043

Disbursements
Disbursements	Amount (USD)
Operating Expenditures	30,274
Exempt Legal and Accounting	5,500
Total Disbursements	35,774

Cash Summary
Category	Amount (USD)
Beginning Cash On Hand	7,731
Current Cash On Hand	2,802
Net Contributions	401,939
Net Operating Expenditures	379,678

=== 2012 congressional candidacy ===
Although he lives in West Virginia, Terry paid his filing fee and ran as an independent candidate for Congress in Florida's 20th District. Incumbent Democrat Alcee Hastings won that election with 88% of the vote on November 6, 2012.

=== 2024 presidential candidacy ===
On March 29, 2024, Terry declared his candidacy in the 2024 United States presidential election.

Randall Terry 2024 presidential campaign
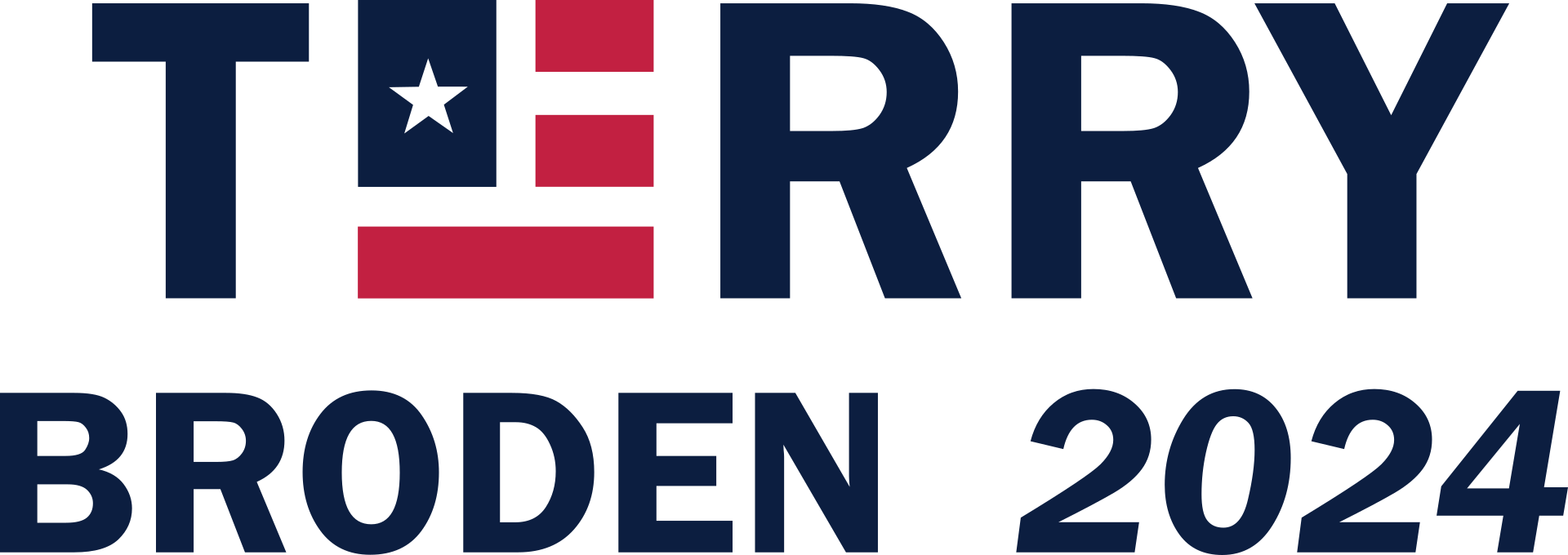
- Campaign: 2024 Constitution Party presidential primaries 2024 United States presidential election
- Candidate: Randall Terry; Stephen Broden
- Affiliation: Constitution Party (United States)
- Status: Announced: March 29, 2024; Official nominee: April 27, 2024

Website
- https://www.terry2024.com/ (archived)

He was nominated by the Constitution Party for president on April 27, 2024. He said he would not accept the nomination if Stephen Broden was not nominated for vice president. He was nominated by the Constitution Party of Oregon on May 28, 2024. Some state parties such as Nevada and Utah rejected Terry's nomination and instead nominated convention opponent Joel Skousen.

In August 2024, The New York Times reported that some Democratic Party donors and operatives were assisting Terry's ballot access efforts and seeking to promote his campaign among pro-life voters, in order to help Democratic nominee Kamala Harris by taking votes from Donald Trump.

Terry's campaign paid for ads that aired on ABC in October, during commercial breaks for ABC World News Tonight, Jimmy Kimmel Live!, and The View. They drew media attention for containing graphic photos of aborted fetuses, and narration which compared celebrities who supported abortion rights to Nazis. Because Terry met the Federal Communications Commission's definition of a "legally qualified candidate", ABC was required to air the advertisements without any edits, though due to their controversial content, the network ran disclaimers noting its legal duty to broadcast them and warning viewers of the imagery within.

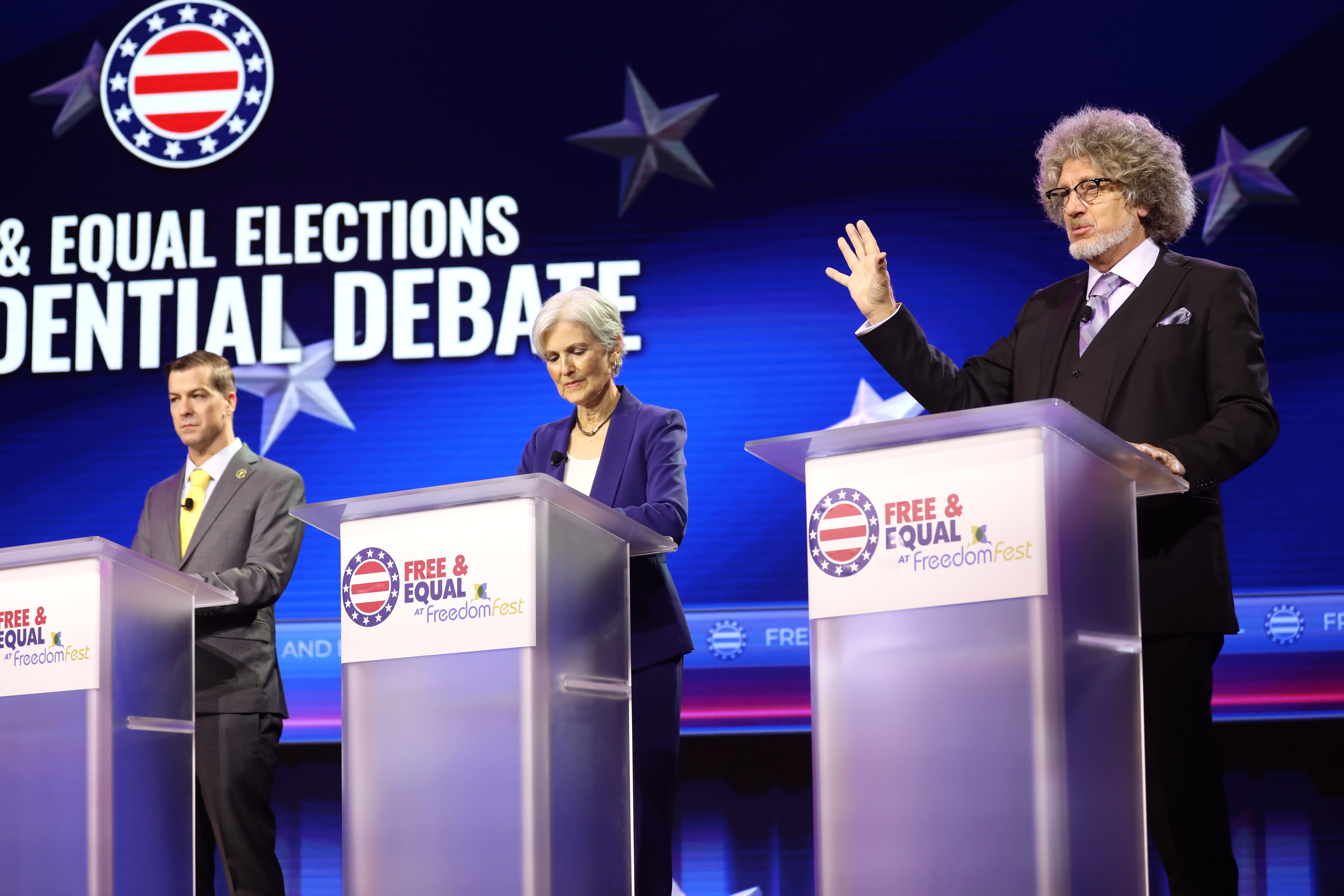
From left to right: Oliver, Stein, and Terry at the Free and Equal debate in Las Vegas.

== Personal life ==
Terry has been married three times. With his first wife Cindy, he had a daughter and then he fostered two additional daughters and a son. He adopted the two youngest foster children. He has four sons with his second wife, Andrea. In March 2026, he married progressive anti-abortion activist Terrisa Bukovinac.

The son of public school teachers, Terry was raised in Rochester, New York. After dropping out of high school, hitch-hiking around the United States, and returning home to work in various jobs, he attended Elim Bible Institute, graduating in 1981. He later earned degrees from Empire State College and Norwich University.

In the early 1980s, Terry married Cindy Dean, a woman whom he had met in Bible school. In 1985, he met a woman who gave birth to her second child in prison and was planning to have an abortion rather than have a third child. Terry persuaded her to continue with the pregnancy and a daughter named Tila was born later that year. In 1987, Cindy and Randall Terry had a daughter together, whom they named Faith. In March 1988, they took in Tila, then aged three, and her siblings Jamiel, 8, and Ebony, 12, as foster children. All three of them are biracial; their mother was white. Terry formally adopted the two younger children in 1994 and on his résumé, he began to describe his family as: "Children: One by birth and three black foster children," although Ebony had left home at the age of 16 in 1991.

Ebony, who was not adopted by Terry, uses the surname Whetstone, but Jamiel and Tila took and retained the surname Terry. Ebony converted to Islam, a religion which Terry has preached is composed of "murderers" and "terrorists." In 2004, Terry described his relationship with Ebony as "good." However, Terry banned Tila from his home after she became pregnant outside of marriage twice by the age of 18; her first pregnancy ended in a miscarriage.

In 1998, when Terry was accused of advocating racism while he was running for Congress, his son Jamiel stepped forward to defend him. In 2000, Jamiel worked with his father on Steven Forbes' campaign for the Republican nomination for U.S. president, and he campaigned with his father against gay marriage in Vermont. In 2004, Jamiel publicly announced that he was gay and he also wrote an article for Out Magazine, for which he was paid US$2,500. When he learned that the Out article was going to be published, Terry pre-empted Jamiel by writing an essay, "My Prodigal Son, the Homosexual", in which he writes of pain and disappointment, blames Jamiel's homosexuality and his other troubles on his childhood experiences, and contends that much of the Out Magazine article is false and was written by other people. Jamiel's response was, "My father's first and foremost aim is to protect himself. He talks about how I prostitute the family's name, but he's used the fact that he saved my sister from abortion and rescued me from hardship in his speeches and interviews. What's the difference?"

In 2000, Terry divorced Cindy Dean, his wife of 19 years, and married his former church assistant, Andrea Sue Kollmorgen. Kollmorgen, born c. 1976, was approximately 25 years old at the time of their nuptials; As a consequence of the divorce, the home on 119 acres (0.48 km^{2}) where he had lived with Cindy and their four children was going to be sold. In 2000, some in the press unfavorably compared his decision to divorce Cindy Dean and marry Kollmorgen to the opinion which he expressed in his 1995 book, The Judgment of God: "Families are destroyed as a father vents his mid-life crisis by abandoning his wife for a 'younger, prettier model.' " His sentiments against divorce had been so strong that when his own parents got divorced, "Randall refused to let his children speak with their grandfather for three years," according to interviews which were conducted with the family by the Washington Post.

As a result of Terry's divorce from Cindy Dean, the pastor of the Landmark Church of Binghamton, New York, "unceremoniously tossed him out" although Terry had been a member there for 15 years. That church had previously censured him because he had abandoned his wife and the two children while they were still living at home in preparation for divorce, and it also censured him by claiming that he was engaging in a "pattern of repeated and sinful relationships and conversations with both single and married women." After the censure and expulsion, Terry joined the Charismatic Episcopal Church, a denomination which was established in 1992.

After a period of study which commenced in 2005, Terry formally converted to Catholicism in 2006, taking the confirmation name David Mark. After his conversion, he disavowed his first marriage and divorce, saying, "There were tragic problems that were inherent to the marriage. According to Catholic doctrine as it has been taught to me, those problems made it an invalid sacrament."

In 2004, the Washington Post reported that Terry and Cindy's daughter was in college. Five years into his second marriage, a 2006 article in the National Catholic Register described his current family as "his three, soon to be four, rambunctious young boys." Terry's second wife, Andrea, is also an anti-abortion activist and in 2008, she was arrested for trespassing while she was leafleting a Catholic cathedral parking lot with campaign fliers for a fictitious candidate who was advocating the enslavement of African-Americans. Terry stated, "The piece was intended to be incendiary and basically a satire," a protest against vehicles in the church parking lot which, he said, carried bumper stickers supporting pro-choice political candidates, particularly Rudy Giuliani.

Terry's son Jamiel was killed in an automobile accident in November 2011. They had reportedly reconciled prior to Jamiel's death. Terry's daughter Tila died in 2024.

In 2012, Terry moved his family to Romney, West Virginia, to focus on his political campaign.

== Electoral history ==
=== Downballot runs ===
1998 New York's 26th congressional district election
Party	Candidate	Votes	%
Democratic	Maurice D. Hinchey	99,249	52.56%
Independence	Maurice D. Hinchey	6,321	3.35%
Liberal	Maurice D. Hinchey	2,634	1.39%
Total	Maurice D. Hinchey (incumbent)	108,204	57.30%
Republican	William "Bud" Walker	47,084	24.93%
Conservative	William "Bud" Walker	7,692	4.07%
Total	William "Bud" Walker	54,776	29.01%
Right to Life	Randall Terry	12,160	6.44%
Total votes		188,835	100.00%
Democratic hold			

2006 Florida Senate District 8 Republican Primary
Party	Candidate	Votes	%
Republican	James E. King (incumbent)	27,548	67.33%
Republican	Randall Terry	13,369	32.67%
Total votes		40,917	100.00%

2012 Florida congressional election, District 20
Party	Candidate	Votes	%
Democratic	Alcee Hastings (incumbent)	214,727	87.90%
Independent	Randall Terry	29,553	12.10%
Independent	Anthony M. Dutrow (write-in)	5	0.00%
Total votes		244,285	100.00%
Democratic hold			

2025 Florida's 6th congressional district special election
Party	Candidate	Votes	%	±%
Republican	Randy Fine	110,764	56.66%	−9.87%
Democratic	Josh Weil	83,485	42.71%	+9.24%
Libertarian	Andrew Parrott	701	0.36%	N/A
Independent	Randall Terry	525	0.27%	N/A
Total votes		195,475	100.0%	
Republican hold				

=== Presidential runs ===
See 2012 Democratic Party presidential primaries (ran as a Democrat) and Third-party and independent candidates for the 2024 United States presidential election (ran with the Constitution Party).

== Works ==
=== Bibliography ===
- Accessory To Murder: The Enemies, Allies, And Accomplices To The Death of Our Culture (1990) ISBN 0-943497-78-7
- Why Does A Nice Guy Like Me... Keep Getting Thrown In Jail?: How theological escapism and cultural retreatism in the Church have led to America's demise. (1993) ISBN 1-56384-052-9
- The Sword: The Blessing Of Righteous Government And The Overthrow Of Tyrants (1995) ISBN 1-887690-00-X
- A Humble Plea: To Bishops, Clergy, Laymen: Ending the Abortion Holocaust (2008) http://ahumbleplea.com

=== Discography ===
- I Believe in You
- Dark Sunglasses Day
