= Stephen Broden =

American politician (born 1952)

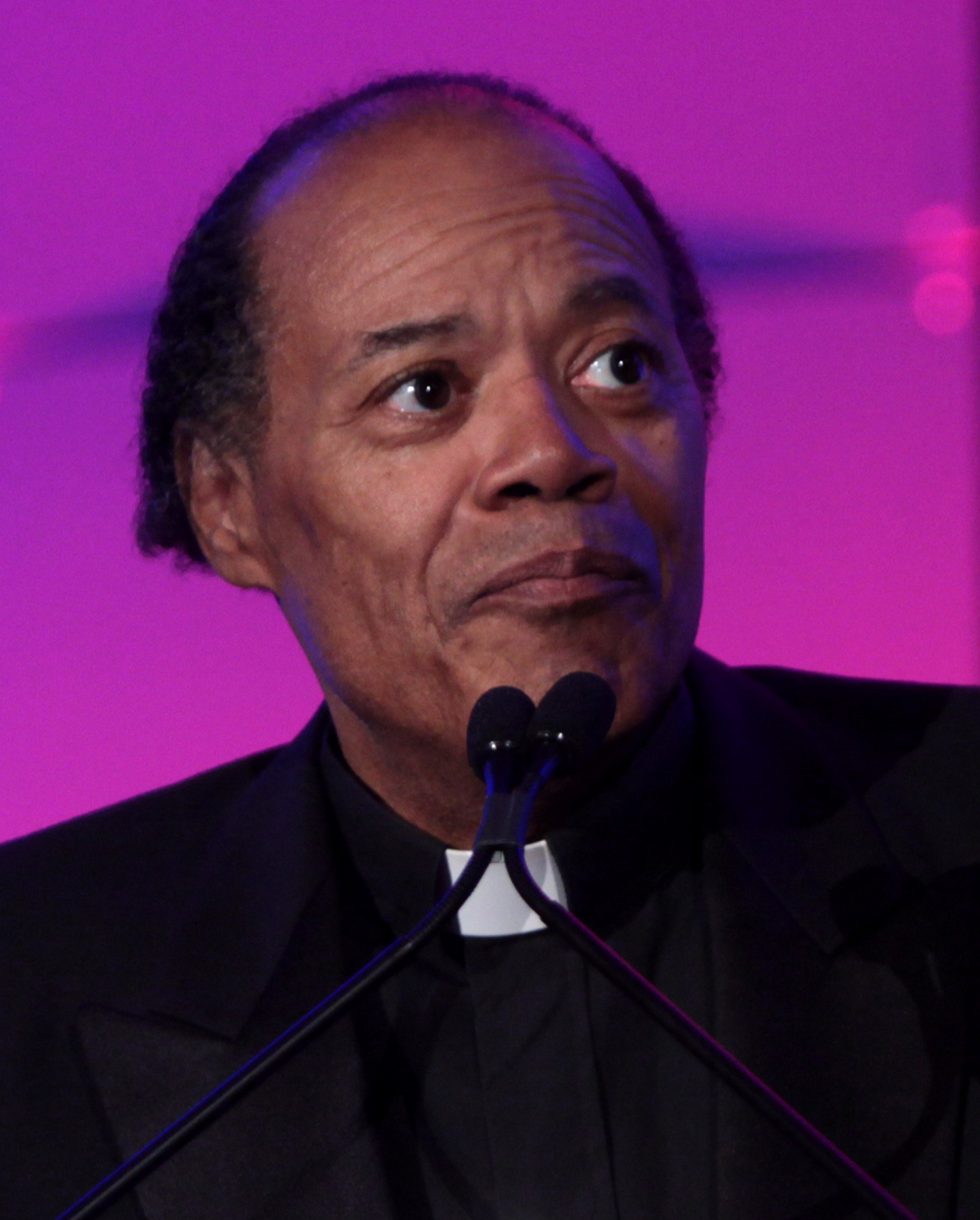
- Broden in 2015
- Born: April 11, 1952 (age 74)
- Education: University of Michigan (BA, MA); Dallas Theological Seminary (MA)
- Occupations: Political activist; businessman; pastor
- Political party: Independent (since 2025); Constitution (2024–2025); Republican (before 2024)
- Spouse: Donna
- Children: 3

Stephen Edward Broden (born April 11, 1952) is an American businessman, pastor, political activist, broadcaster, and former professor from the state of Texas. In 2010, he was the Republican nominee for Texas's 30th congressional district for the United States House of Representatives. He was defeated by Democratic incumbent Eddie Bernice Johnson. He was the Constitution Party's candidate for vice president in the 2024 United States presidential election.

== Education ==
Broden graduated from the University of Michigan with a Bachelor of Arts and then a Master of Arts degree in communication, and he later studied at the Dallas Theological Seminary, where he received a Master of Arts in Bible studies.

He served as an adjunct professor at Dallas Baptist University from 1990 to 1992 and spent 10 years in the private sector at Atlantic Richfield Company (ARCO) in human resources. He has been a business owner of several self-serve car wash facilities, and has also worked as a newscaster, disc jockey, and radio broadcaster, co-hosting Life and Liberty on KSKY-AM and presenting One-Minute "thought of the day" commentaries on this station.

== Career ==
Broden founded the Fair Park Bible Fellowship Church in 1987 and became its senior pastor. He has also served as president of the Fair Park Friendship Center as its executive director. The center provides assistance to the community's "inner-city" families, including a clothing store and back-to-school rally where children from neighborhood families are provided with donated school supplies and family counseling.

Broden advocates in the Fair Park and South Dallas areas for economic opportunity, improved access to education, and against abortion. He is a spokesman for the black anti-abortion movement in Dallas and a contributor to blackprolifemovement.blogspot.com. He is a founder of Ebony Berean, an organization whose mission includes informing African-American Pastors of the "culture war".

He was affiliated with the Tea Party movement.

Broden has been a recurring political commentator on Fox News Channel, including appearances on the Glenn Beck show.

He was awarded "Champion of the Republican Party" by the NRCC Business Advisory Council Texas and has also received the Ronald Reagan Gold Medal Award. From 1999 to 2002 he served as Republican Precinct Chairman in DeSoto, Texas.

=== 2010 U.S. House election ===
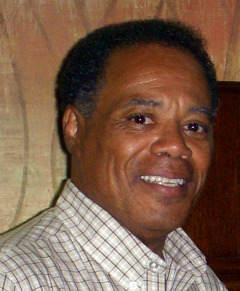
Broden in 2010

On March 2, 2010, Broden won the plurality of votes, in a three-way Republican primary election for the U.S. House in Texas's 30th congressional district, with 46.6%. On April 13, 2010 he won the Republican Primary runoff election, with 67.5% of the votes, and became the 2010 Republican candidate for the November general election.

In October 2010, Broden was accused of saying that the current federal government was "tyrannical" and suggested violent overthrow could not be ruled out if there was not a "change in leadership" resulting from the November elections during an interview with a local Dallas Television Station.

Johnson ended up defeating Broden by a margin of over 54%. Johnson had the largest margin of victory of any Democrat running for the U.S. House in Texas in 2010.

=== Marlise Muñoz ===
Broden argued for continuation of artificial life support for the body of Marlise Muñoz and led a vigil outside the Texas hospital where her body was kept on artificial life support. She was 14 weeks pregnant when her husband found her unconscious in November, possibly from a blood clot and subsequently died from brain death. Prior to her death she had indicated that she would not like to be kept artificially alive if brain dead. The fetus had suffered from oxygen deprivation and was suspected to be non-viable. The fetus' lower extremities were deformed to the extent that the gender could not be determined. The unborn child also had fluid building up inside the skull (Hydrocephalus) and possibly had a heart problem. A 2002 study estimated the cost for an ICU bed in an average U.S. hospital is $2,000 to $3,000 per day. An attorney who had helped rewrite the Texas state law being used to keep her body on life support at John Peter Smith Hospital said that there was a problem with the application of the law to a patient that was no longer alive. Her husband Erick, with the support of her family, successfully petitioned a court to order termination of life support.

=== 2024 presidential election ===
In 2024, Broden was selected as Randall Terry's vice presidential running mate for the Constitution Party's ticket.

== Personal life ==
Broden and his wife, Donna, have three children.
