= Pastreich =

Pastreich (/ˈpæstraɪʃ/) is a surname. Notable people with the surname include:

- Emanuel Pastreich (born 1964), American academic
- Michael Pastreich (born 1966), American performing arts executive
- Peter Pastreich (born 1938), American orchestra executive, father of Emanuel and Michael
