= 2024 Green National Convention =

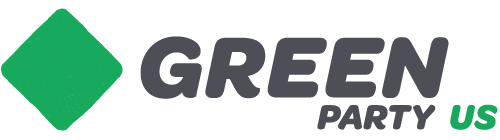
- 2024 presidential election

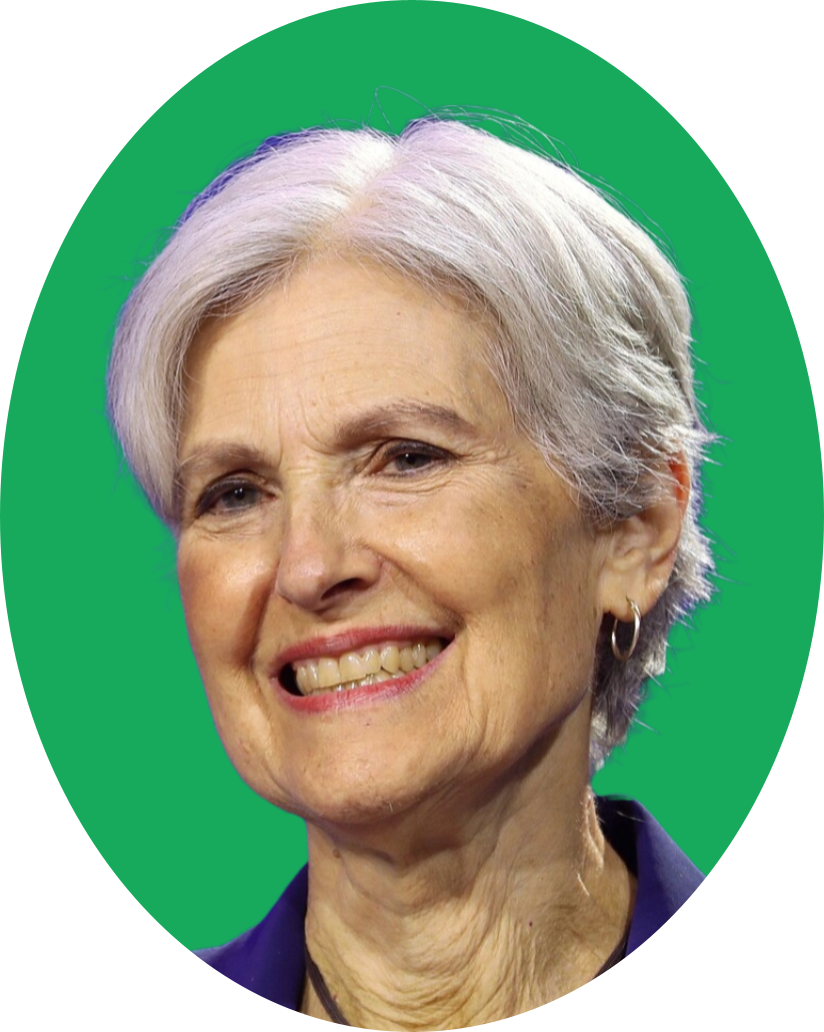
- Nominees; Stein and Ware

Convention
- Dates: August 15–18, 2024
- Keynote speaker: Margaret Kimberley

Candidates
- Presidential nominee: Jill Stein of Massachusetts
- Vice-presidential nominee: Butch Ware of California

Voting
- Total delegates: 293
- Votes needed for nomination: 147

The 2024 Green National Convention was a political event to select the Green Party of the United States nominees for president and vice president in the 2024 election. It was held on August 15–18, 2024, taking place as a virtual event. The party's delegates formally nominated Jill Stein as the party's presidential nominee and Butch Ware as her running mate.

== Nominating process ==
According to the Green Party, states have different methods of nominating candidates such as a primary or a nominating convention. The party's standing committee for nomination, the Presidential Campaign Support Committee (PCSC), list certain requirements to be a recognized candidate; when the requirements are met the PCSC will give the candidates support to get their names on primary and convention ballots. Recognition is not required to be a candidate for the Green Party's nomination. Once state primaries, caucuses, and conventions are complete, delegates vote to nominate a candidate for president and vice-president.

=== Recognition ===
The following candidates have been either fully recognized, partially recognized, or recognized as seeking the party's nomination:

Candidates by recognition status

==== Fully recognized ====
- Jill Stein, nominee for president in 2012 and 2016

==== Partially recognized ====
- Jasmine Sherman, non-profit executive director
- Jorge Zavala, businessman

==== Acknowledged active candidates ====
- Robert Cooke IV, self-proclaimed prophet
- Dashaun "Daví" Davis, activist
- Randy Toler, co-chair of the Florida Green Party, disputed co-founder of the Green Party

==== Unrecognized ====
- Keith Bagley
- Anita Belle
- Mason Vicent Cysewski
- Tyler Gray
- Adam Hollick
- Emanuel Pastreich
- Jackie Tate

== Guest speakers ==
The following people were announced as guest speakers and hosts of work-shops that will be held during the convention:

- Jim Becklund, co-chair of the Green Party Elders Caucus
- Chris Blankenhorn, former co-chair of the Green National Committee (2016–2018)
- Marsha Coleman-Adebayo, author
- Barbara Dahlgren, former co-chair of the Wisconsin Green Party
- Andy Ellis, campaign organizer
- Philena Farley, community organizer
- Mike Feinstein, co-founder of the California Green Party
- Asa Gordon, chair of the D.C. Statehood Green Party
- Howie Hawkins, Green Party co-founder and nominee for president in 2020
- Haig Hovaness, peace activist
- Rita Jacobs, lawyer and anti-war activist
- Emily Kawano, business owner
- Terry Lodge
- Daniel Lugassy
- Rita Maniotis, campaign activist
- Gloria Mattera, co-chair of the New York Green Party
- Caledon Myers, non-profit executive director
- Sue Peters, financial systems technologist
- AJ Reed, organizer
- Anita Rios, Green Party nominee for the 2014 Ohio gubernatorial election
- Rob Richie, ranked-choice voting activist
- Lynne Serpe, educator and campaign consultant
- Ryan Swan, researcher
- Howard Switzer, Green Party nominee for the 2010 Tennessee gubernatorial election

== Presidential delegate vote ==
The delegate votes as they were reported during the 2024 Green National Convention. Jill Stein Jasmine Sherman Dashaun "Daví" Davis Ajamu Baraka Randy Toler Uncommitted/NOTA

2024 Green National Convention presidential vote

Candidate	Delegates	Percentage
Jill Stein	267	91.13%
Jasmine Sherman	13	4.44%
Abstained/NOTA	10	3.41%
Dashaun "Daví" Davis	2	0.68%
Ajamu Baraka (write-in)	1/2	0.17%
Randy Toler	1/2	0.17%
Totals	293	100%

== Vice presidential selection ==
Stein announced Butch Ware as her pick for vice presidential running mate during a virtual rally on August 16, 2024.

== See also ==
- 2024 Green Party presidential primaries
- 2024 Republican National Convention
- 2024 Democratic National Convention
- 2024 Libertarian National Convention
- 2024 Constitution National Convention
- 2024 United States presidential election
