= Jill Stein 2024 presidential campaign =

American political campaign

Jill Stein for President 2024
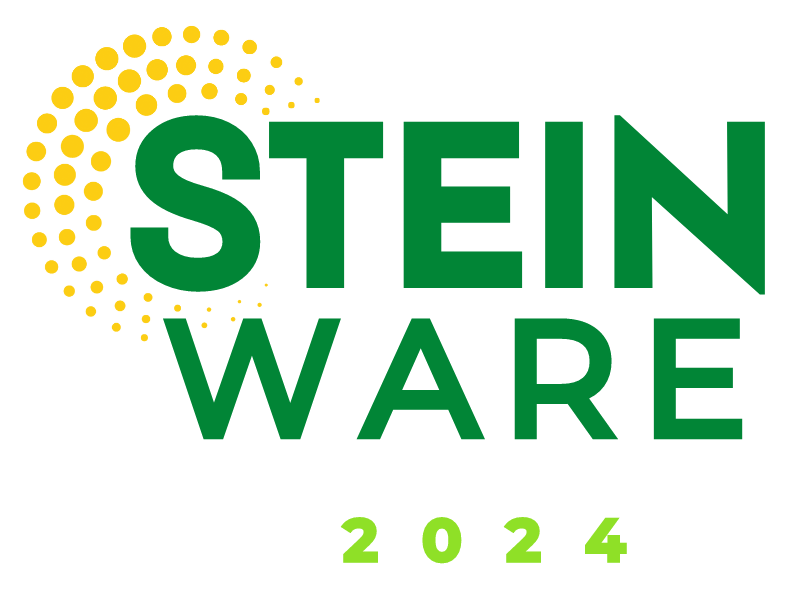
- Campaign: 2024 U.S. presidential election 2024 Green primaries
- Candidate: Jill Stein; Physician, 2012 and 2016 Green Party presidential candidate Butch Ware; History professor and author
- Affiliation: Green Party
- Status: Announced: November 9, 2023; Presumptive nominee: May 26, 2024; Official nominee: August 17, 2024
- Receipts: US$2,751,003 (November 25, 2024)
- Slogan(s): People, Planet, Peace

Website
- www.jillstein2024.com

Jill Stein, a physician from Massachusetts, announced her entry into the 2024 United States presidential election on November 9, 2023. Stein had been the Green Party nominee in 2012 and 2016. In 2012, she received 470,000 votes. In the 2016 election, she received 1.46 million votes (1.1% of the popular vote).

In the 2024 general election, Stein garnered 862,049 votes (.056% of the popular vote).

== Background ==
In June 2023, Stein took on the role of campaign manager for the 2024 presidential campaign of activist and scholar Cornel West, who was then seeking the nomination of the Green Party. After West withdrew from the Green Party to continue his campaign as an independent, Stein launched her campaign for the Green Party's 2024 presidential nomination in November 2023.

== Platform ==
When announcing her candidacy, Stein described the two-party political system as "broken." She called for prioritizing a "pro-worker, anti-war, climate emergency agenda" in the upcoming election, aiming to bring these issues to the forefront of national discourse.

Stein has also been an outspoken critic of U.S. foreign policy, particularly regarding the Israeli–Palestinian conflict. Following the October 2023 Hamas attack, she condemned Israel's military actions in the Gaza Strip and criticized President Joe Biden for what she described as a failure to intervene against what she termed Israel's "genocidal rampage."

== Polling ==
Stein was polling between 0.9% and 1.2% nationally as of November 3, 2024.

An August 2024 survey published by the Council on American-Islamic Relations (CAIR) found that 29% of Muslim voters planned to vote for Stein. In Michigan, 40 percent of Muslim voters supported Stein, 18% supported Trump and 12% supported Harris. CAIR's final election poll, published on November 1, showed that nationwide among Muslims, 42.3% planned to vote for Stein, 41% for Harris, and 9.8% for Trump.

== Campaign ==
=== Announcement ===
On November 9, 2023, Stein announced her third bid for president.

=== Developments ===
Stein took part in a presidential debate hosted by the Free & Equal Elections Foundation on February 29, 2024, alongside Party for Socialism and Liberation nominee Claudia De la Cruz, fellow Green candidate Jasmine Sherman, and Libertarian candidates Chase Oliver and Lars Mapstead.

Stein and two campaign staff members were among more than 80 individuals arrested by local police on April 27 at Washington University in St. Louis while protesting the Israeli invasion of the Gaza Strip as a part of the nationwide protests on university campuses. According to Stein on Twitter, she and the other protestors were held at the St. Louis County Jail until 2 a.m. the next day. Stein criticized the university's handling of the protest, accusing the administration of violating their freedom of speech.

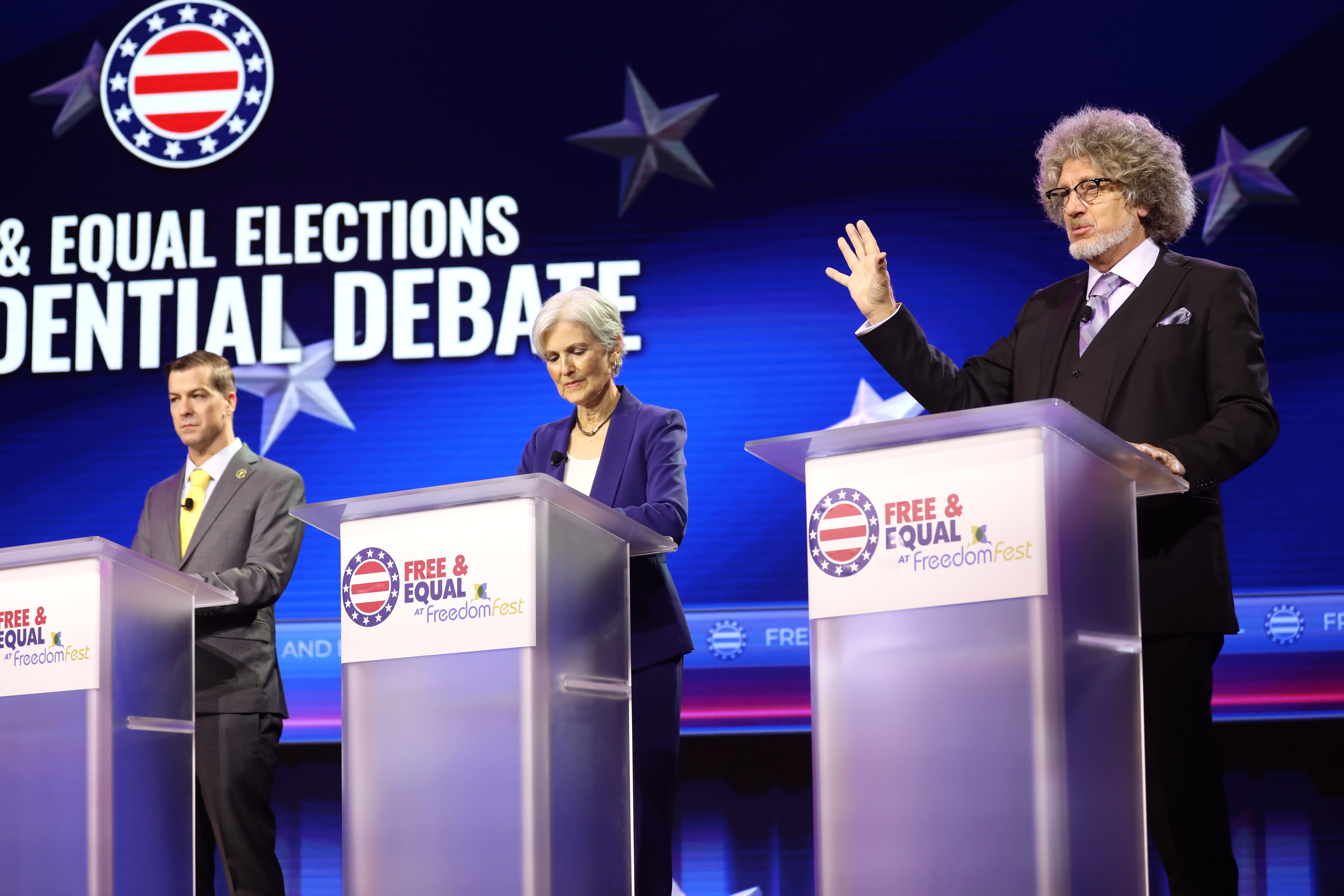
From left to right: Oliver, Stein, and Terry at the Free and Equal debate in Las Vegas.

The campaign announced on May 26 that it had accrued enough delegates to secure the Green Party nomination.

Some Republicans boosted Stein's candidacy in the hopes that she would attract voters away from Kamala Harris. Stein's campaign paid over $100,000 to Accelevate, a Republican-connected signature gathering enterprise operated by Trent Pool and Pool's brother, to assist with ballot access for Stein's 2024 campaign. That firm had also been paid over $10 million for assistance with qualifying Robert F. Kennedy Jr.'s presidential campaign for help with ballot access in the same election.

On October 24, Stein once again participated in a debate hosted by the Free and Equal Elections Foundation, alongside Chase Oliver and Constitution Party nominee Randall Terry.

=== Vice presidential selection ===
Stein reportedly considered offering the nomination to Dearborn, Michigan mayor Abdullah Hammoud, although he would be too young to be inaugurated as vice president. On August 16, she announced Rudolph "Butch" Ware as her running mate.

=== Kentucky ===
In Kentucky, the Green Party was not on the ballot; instead Stein ran under the banner of the Kentucky Party. Ware was replaced on the Kentucky ballot as Stein's vice-presidential candidate by Florida activist Samson LeBeau Kpadenou.

== Reception ==
=== Endorsements ===
Organizations

- Muslim American Public Affairs Council
- Abandon Harris

Local officials

- Kshama Sawant, former Seattle City Council member (2014–2024) (Revolutionary Workers)

Individuals

- Susan Abulhawa, writer and human rights activist
- Tariq Ali, activist, writer and public intellectual
- Medea Benjamin, founder of Code Pink
- Caitlin Durante, American writer and comedian
- David Duke, Neo-Nazi and former Imperial Wizard, Knights of the Ku Klux Klan (Disavowed)
- Jeffrey Sachs, Columbia University professor
- Roger Waters, co-founder of Pink Floyd

=== Calls by European Green parties to drop out ===
On November 1, the European Greens released a statement, signed by representatives from 16 European countries, asking Stein to drop out of the presidential election and endorse Kamala Harris, arguing that "Harris is the only candidate who can block Donald Trump and his anti-democratic, authoritarian policies." Stein's team said it was disappointed that "one group of Greens [would] tell another to stop participating in democracy" and that it "would never betray our legion of supporters – and the many supporters who have already cast votes – by abandoning our mission now".

== Ballot access ==
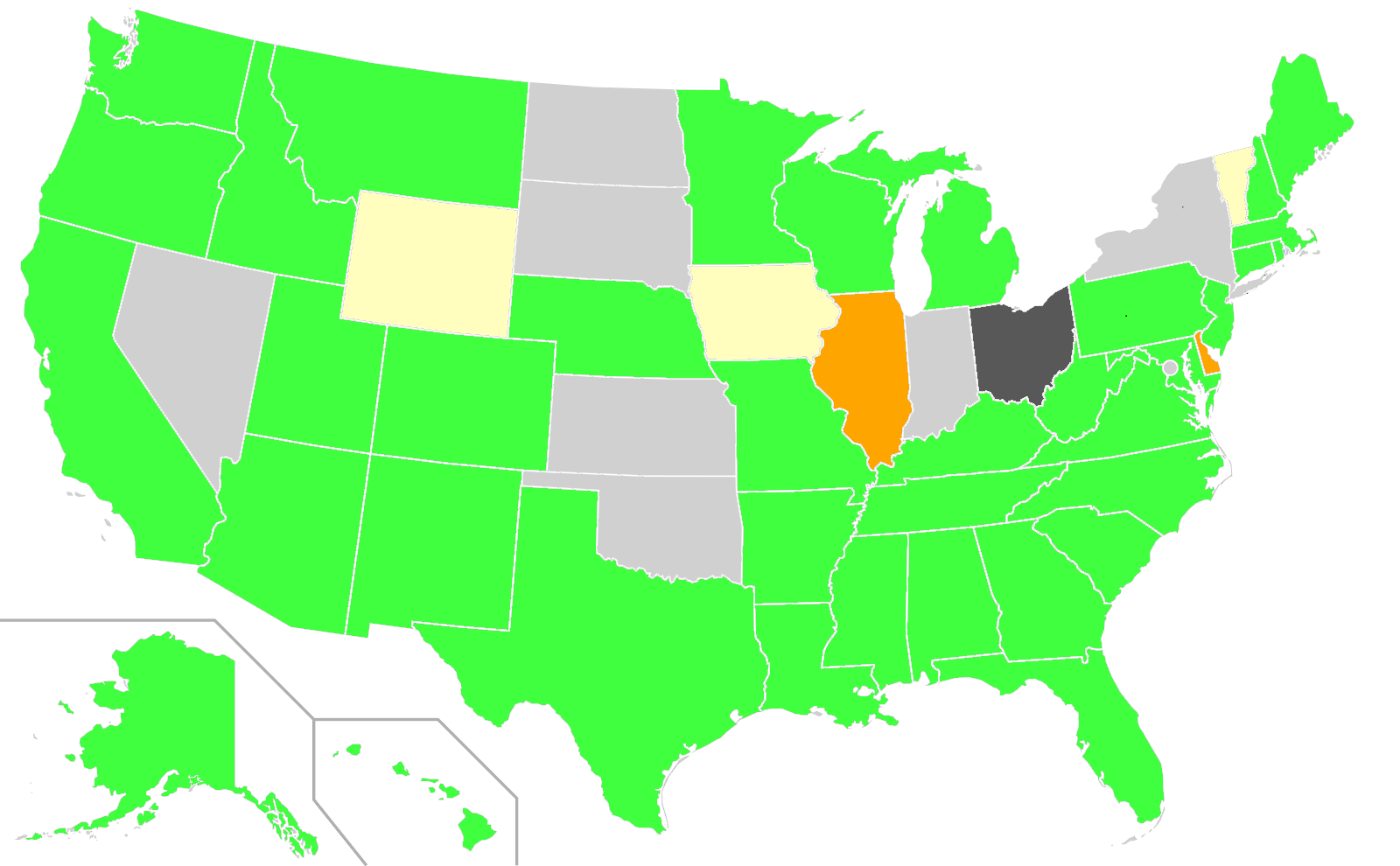
Stein ballot access for the 2024 presidential election, as of September 2024: Certified for ballot (37 states, 420 electors) (Note: Stein on the ballot in: Alabama (9, Independent); Alaska (3, as Independent); Arizona (11); Arkansas (6); California (54); Colorado (10); Connecticut (7); Florida (30); Georgia (16); Hawaii (4); Idaho (4, as independent); Kentucky (8, as Kentucky Party); Louisiana (8); Maine (4); Maryland (10); Massachusetts (11); Michigan (15); Minnesota (10); Mississippi (6); Missouri (10); Montana (4); Nebraska (5); New Hampshire (4); New Jersey (14); New Mexico (5); North Carolina (16); Oregon (8); Pennsylvania (19); Rhode Island (4); South Carolina (9); Tennessee (11, as Independent); Texas (40); Utah (6); Virginia (13); Washington (12); West Virginia (4); Wisconsin (10)) Registered write-in (Four states, 56 electors) (Note: Stein registered write-in in: Delaware (3); Illinois (19); Kansas (6); New York (28)) Automatic write-in (Three states, 12 electors) (Note: Stein write-in states: Iowa (6); Vermont (3); Wyoming (3)) On ballot, votes did not count (One state, 17 electors) (Note: Stein disqualified states: Ohio (17, as Independent)) Not on ballot

The Democratic Party fought to exclude Stein from the ballot in a number of states. The Wisconsin Supreme Court decided against hearing the lawsuit brought forward by the Democratic National Committee against Stein. The lawsuit was described as an attempt to remove her from the Wisconsin ballot. As of August 2024 she remained on the ballot in Wisconsin.

Stein's campaign was represented at the Supreme Court by Jay Sekulow, a former lawyer to Republican presidential candidate Donald Trump, to get on the Nevada ballot, while Democrats fought to keep Stein off due to their belief that she would be a spoiler candidate. The Supreme Court rejected Stein's application in a one-sentence order without comment or dissent. The Associated Press reported on the Republican efforts to help Jill Stein get on the ballot and compared it to Republican attempts to place Cornel West and his campaign on the ballots of swing states in the belief that West would act as a spoiler candidate.

	totals	2024	2020	2016	2012	2008^{A}	2004^{A}	2000^{B}
States (& DC)	51	42 (42)	45 (46)	47 (48)	45 (46)	48 (49)	43 (44)	47 (48)
Electoral Votes	538	454 (454)	511 (514)	519 (522)	486 (489)	525 (528)	486 (489)	510 (513)
Alabama	9	On ballot	Write-in	On ballot	On ballot	Write-in	Write-in	On ballot
Alaska	3	On ballot	Write-in	On ballot	On ballot	Write-in	On ballot	On ballot
Arizona	11	On ballot	Write-in	On ballot	On ballot	On ballot	Write-in	On ballot
Arkansas	6	On ballot	On ballot	On ballot	On ballot	On ballot	On ballot	On ballot
California	55	On ballot	On ballot	On ballot	On ballot	On ballot	On ballot	On ballot
Colorado	9	On ballot	On ballot	On ballot	On ballot	On ballot	On ballot	On ballot
Connecticut	7	On ballot	On ballot	On ballot	Write-in	Write-in	On ballot	On ballot
Delaware	3	Write-in	On ballot	On ballot	On ballot	On ballot	On ballot	On ballot
Florida	29	On ballot	On ballot	On ballot	On ballot	On ballot	On ballot	On ballot
Georgia	16	On ballot	Write-in	Write-in	Write-in	Write-in	Write-in	Write-in
Hawaii	4	On ballot	On ballot	On ballot	On ballot	On ballot	On ballot	On ballot
Idaho	4	On ballot	Write-in	On ballot	On ballot	Write-in	Write-in	Write-in
Illinois	20	Write-in	On ballot	On ballot	On ballot	On ballot	Write-in	On ballot
Indiana	11	Not on ballot	Write-in	Write-in	Write-in	Write-in	Write-in	Write-in
Iowa	6	Write-in	On ballot	On ballot	On ballot	On ballot	On ballot	On ballot
Kansas	6	Not on ballot	Write-in	On ballot	Write-in	Write-in	Write-in	On ballot
Kentucky	8	On ballot	Write-in	On ballot	On ballot	Write-in	Not on ballot	On ballot
Louisiana	8	On ballot	Not on ballot	On ballot	On ballot	On ballot	On ballot	On ballot
Maine	4	On ballot	On ballot	On ballot	On ballot	On ballot	On ballot	On ballot
Maryland	10	On ballot	On ballot	On ballot	On ballot	On ballot	On ballot	On ballot
Massachusetts	11	On ballot	On ballot	On ballot	On ballot	On ballot	Not on ballot	On ballot
Michigan	16	On ballot	On ballot	On ballot	On ballot	On ballot	On ballot	On ballot
Minnesota	10	On ballot	On ballot	On ballot	On ballot	On ballot	On ballot	On ballot
Mississippi	6	On ballot	On ballot	On ballot	On ballot	On ballot	On ballot	On ballot
Missouri	10	On ballot	On ballot	On ballot	Not on ballot	Write-in	Not on ballot	On ballot
Montana	3	On ballot	Not on ballot	On ballot	Not on ballot	Write-in	On ballot	On ballot
Nebraska	5	On ballot	Write-in	On ballot	Not on ballot	On ballot	On ballot	On ballot
Nevada	6	Not on ballot	Not on ballot	Not on ballot	On ballot	On ballot	Not on ballot	On ballot
New Hampshire	4	On ballot	Write-in	On ballot	Write-in	Write-in	Write-in	On ballot
New Jersey	14	On ballot	On ballot	On ballot	On ballot	On ballot	On ballot	On ballot
New Mexico	5	On ballot	On ballot	On ballot	On ballot	On ballot	On ballot	On ballot
New York	29	Write-in	On ballot	On ballot	On ballot	On ballot	Write-in	On ballot
North Carolina	15	On ballot	On ballot	Write-in	Write-in	Write-in	Write-in	Not on ballot
North Dakota	3	Not on ballot	Write-in	On ballot	On ballot	Write-in	Not on ballot	On ballot
Ohio	18	On ballot, not count	On ballot	On ballot	On ballot	On ballot	Write-in	On ballot
Oklahoma	7	Not on ballot	Not on ballot	Not on ballot	Not on ballot	Not on ballot	Not on ballot	Not on ballot
Oregon	7	On ballot	On ballot	On ballot	On ballot	On ballot	On ballot	On ballot
Pennsylvania	20	On ballot	Write-in	On ballot	On ballot	Write-in	On ballot	On ballot
Rhode Island	4	On ballot	Write-in	On ballot	On ballot	On ballot	On ballot	On ballot
South Carolina	9	On ballot	On ballot	On ballot	On ballot	On ballot	On ballot	On ballot
South Dakota	3	Not on ballot	Not on ballot	Not on ballot	Not on ballot	Not on ballot	Not on ballot	Not on ballot
Tennessee	11	On ballot	On ballot	On ballot	On ballot	On ballot	On ballot	On ballot
Texas	38	On ballot	On ballot	On ballot	On ballot	Write-in	Write-in	On ballot
Utah	6	On ballot	On ballot	On ballot	On ballot	On ballot	Write-in	On ballot
Vermont	3	Write-in	On ballot	On ballot	Write-in	Write-in	Write-in	On ballot
Virginia	13	On ballot	Write-in	On ballot	On ballot	On ballot	Write-in	On ballot
Washington	12	On ballot	On ballot	On ballot	On ballot	On ballot	On ballot	On ballot
West Virginia	5	On ballot	On ballot	On ballot	On ballot	On ballot	Write-in	On ballot
Wisconsin	10	On ballot	Write-in	On ballot	On ballot	On ballot	On ballot	On ballot
Wyoming	3	Write-in	Write-in	On ballot	Write-in	Write-in	Write-in	Write-in
District of Columbia	3	Not on ballot	On ballot	On ballot	On ballot	On ballot	Write-in	On ballot

A. Based on 2004 - 2008 electoral college apportionment.
B. Based on 1992 - 2000 electoral college apportionment.

== Election results ==
The Stein/Ware ticket garnered 862,049 votes or 0.56%, the second highest of Stein's three campaigns, beating her 2012 run but falling short of her 2016 bid. This was the first election since 2000 where the Green Party placed third place in the popular vote. Stein also won over 18% in Dearborn, Michigan, coming in third place behind Harris with 36%, and Trump who won with 42%. (Note: The initial NBC projection on election day depicted Stein's result in Dearborn as 22%, but official results published later showed that her campaign got 18% of the vote there.) (Note: The button which leads to this PDF is titled "Nov. 5, 2024 Presidential Election OFFICIAL", contradicting the PDF's title "UNOFFICIAL RESULTS". The PDF was published several hours after the NBC projection claiming the 22% result on November 6.) In all swing states, Trump's margin of victory exceeded the combined totals of Harris's and Stein's votes, and Stein's candidacy had no impact on Harris' electoral performance.

She received 1.09% of the vote in Maryland, her best state by percentage. In Maine, where the election was conducted via RCV (ranked-choice voting), she got 1.07%. Stein also received over one percent of the vote in California.

Exit polling from the Council on American-Islamic Relations found that 53% of Muslim-American voters supported Stein. In Michigan, 59% of Muslim-American voters supported Stein. In Maryland, 81% of Muslim-American voters supported her. In specific Muslim American communities, Stein won 18.4% of the vote in Dearborn, Michigan, 15.1% of the vote in Dearborn Heights, Michigan, 15% of the vote in South Paterson, New Jersey, 9% of the vote in Hamtramck, Michigan, 4% of the vote around Riverside Plaza in Minneapolis, Minnesota, and 3% of the vote in Melvindale, Michigan. In predominantly Muslim areas of Glendale Heights, Illinois, Stein won between 12% and 15% of the vote.

== See also ==
- 2024 Green Party presidential primaries
- Nationwide opinion polling for the 2024 United States presidential election
- Gaza war protest vote movements
