= 2024 Green Party presidential primaries =

- February 5 to June 4, 2024

420 delegates to the Green Party Convention (Note: 420 represents the maximum number of delegates eligible to be credentialed for the Presidential Nominating Convention (PNC). Delegate counts may change based on the actual number of states and caucuses that send credentialed delegates to the PNC.) 211 delegates votes needed to win
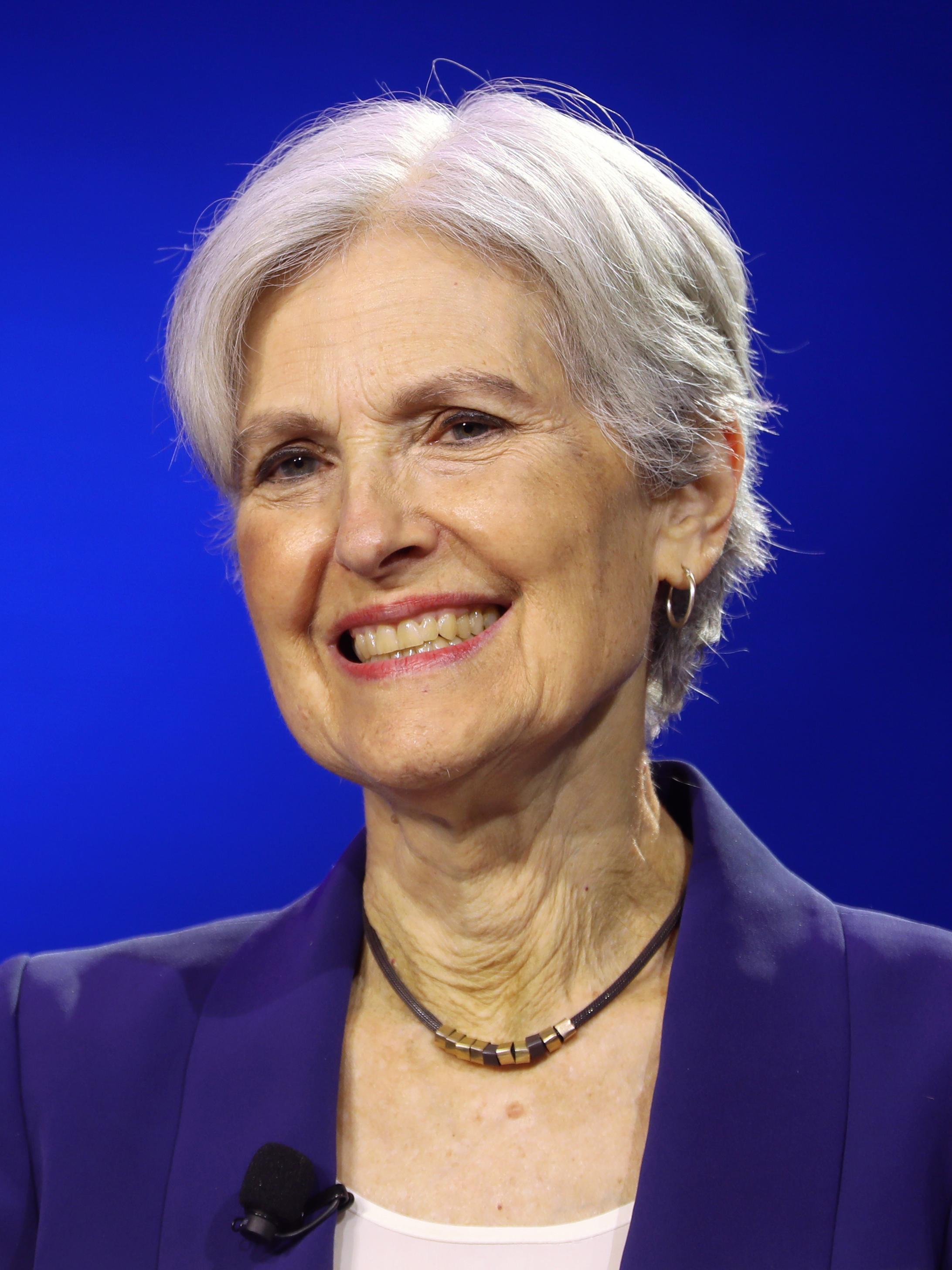

Candidate	Jill Stein	No Preference (Note: Includes 'None of the Above', and 'Uncommitted')	Jasmine Sherman
Home state	Massachusetts	—	North Carolina
Delegate count	182	6	10
Contests won	20	1	0
Popular vote	16,597 (Note: Total votes is based on incomplete data, as many states have not released popular vote totals for primaries, caucuses, and state conventions.)	505	72
Percentage	96.5%	2.9%	0.4%
Convention vote	267	10	13
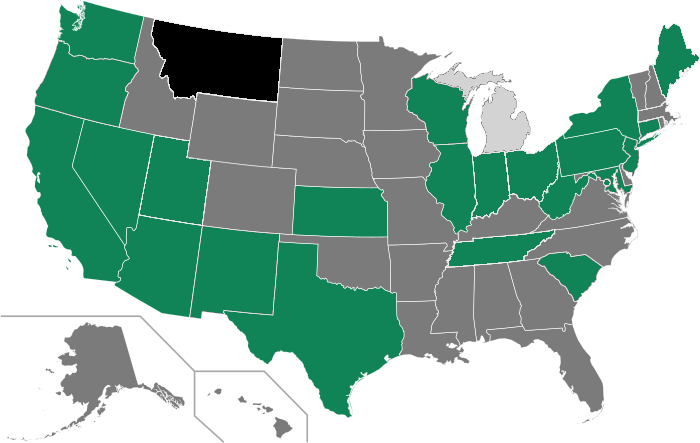
Jill Stein
No Preference
Contest to be held
No contest known as of 7/1
Previous Green nominee
Howie Hawkins
Green nominee
Jill Stein

The 2024 Green Party presidential primaries and caucuses were a series of electoral contests to elect delegates to the 2024 Green National Convention to choose the Green Party's presidential nominee in the 2024 presidential election. The convention was held as a virtual event from August 15 to 18, 2024.

== Background ==
The Green Party has run candidates for president in every election since 1996. Consumer advocate Ralph Nader was the party's nominee in 1996 and 2000. Political activist David Cobb was nominated in 2004; former U.S. congresswoman Cynthia McKinney was the nominee in 2008; physician and activist Jill Stein was nominated in 2012 and 2016; and activist Howie Hawkins was the Green nominee in 2020. Nader's 2.7% in 2000 remains the largest percentage of the vote any Green Party presidential candidate has won.

== Primary contests ==
Map legend
- Jill Stein
- Jasmine Sherman
- None of these candidates
- Delegates TBD
- No contest as of 06/01

Candidates and ballot options receiving delegates are listed individually on the table. All others listed under other.

Date	Contest	Candidates and results			
Date	Contest	Sherman	Stein	Other	Uncommitted (Note: Includes votes for "None of the Above")
February 5	Kansas	0.0% 0 votes	100.0% 7 votes 4 delegates	0.0% 0 votes	0.0% 0 votes
March 4	Pennsylvania	19.4% 25 votes 3 delegates	75.2% 97 votes 10 delegates	4.7% 6 votes (Note: 5 votes for Jorge Zavala, 1 Write-in vote for Cornel West)	0.8% 1 vote
March 5	California	Not on ballot	99.96% 15,801 votes 59 delegates	0.04% 7 votes (Note: 7 write-in votes: 3 for Jorge Zavala, 3 for Matthew Pruden, 1 for Daví)	Not on ballot
March 16	Illinois (Note: Popular Vote Totals Unavailable)	5% 1 delegate	84% 16 delegates	0%	11% 2 delegates
March 19	Arizona (Note: Popular Vote Totals Unavailable)	23.5% 1 delegate	73.5% 3 delegates	3.0% (Note: For Jorge Zavala)	Not on ballot
March 23	New York	1st round: 11.5% 7 votes 2nd round: 11.5% 7 votes 1 delegate	1st round: 86.7% 52 votes 2nd round: 88.3% 53 votes 12 delegates	1st round: 1.7% 1 vote (Note: For Jorge Zavala); 2nd round: 0% 0 votes	Not on ballot
March 24	Washington	15.0% 18 votes	81.7% 98 votes 4 delegates	3.3% 4 votes (Note: 3 votes for Jorge Zavala, 1 write-in vote for Angela Walker)	Not on ballot
March 25	Nevada (Note: Popular vote totals and ballot access information unavailable)	0%	100% 4 delegates	0%	0%
April 13	Texas	12.7% 7 votes 1 delegate	78.2% 43 votes 18 delegates	9.1% 5 votes (Note: 2 votes for Jorge Zavala, 2 votes for Daví, 1 vote for Randy Toler)	Not on ballot
April 22	Wisconsin	15.2% 5 votes 1 delegate	75.8% 25 votes 3 delegates	9.1% 3 votes (Note: For Jorge Zavala)	Not on ballot
April 26	Connecticut	3.7% 1 vote	85.2% 23 votes 9 delegates	3.7% 1 vote (Note: for Jorge Zavala)	7.4% 2 votes
April 27	Tennessee	2nd 1 delegate	Winner; 3 delegates	Unknown	Not on ballot
April 29	Ohio (Note: Popular vote totals unavailable)	22% 1 delegate	78% 5 delegates	0%	Not on ballot
May 3	Maryland	14.3% 6 votes	83.3% 35 votes 5 delegates	2.4% 1 vote (Note: For Jorge Zavala)	Not on ballot
May 4	New Jersey (Note: Popular vote totals unavailable)	Unknown	Winner; 6 delegates	Unknown	
May 4	New Mexico (Note: Popular vote totals unavailable)	Unknown	Winner; 4 delegates	Unknown	
May 10	Utah	28.6% 2 votes	71.4% 5 votes 4 delegates	0% 0 votes	Not on ballot
May 14	West Virginia	Not on ballot	100% 379 votes 4 delegates	Not on ballot	
May 30	Indiana	First ballot: 3.0% 1 vote Final ballot: 0% 0 votes	First ballot: 90.9% 30 votes Final ballot: 93.9% 31 votes 4 delegates	First ballot: 3.0% 1 vote (Note: For Robert Cooke); Final ballot: 0% 0 votes	First ballot: 3.0% 1 vote Final ballot: 6.1% 2 votes
June 4	Washington, D.C.	Not on ballot	100% 1+ votes (Note: 317 undetermined write-in votes; As Stein was the only candidate to file, votes were not counted.); 5 delegates	Not on ballot	
June 4	Montana	Not on ballot			100% 371 votes (Note: For "No preference"); 4 delegates
Totals		0.4% 72 votes 10 delegates	97.2% 16,597 votes 182 delegates	0.2% 28 votes (Note: 0.1%; 18 votes for Jorge Zavala 0.0%; 3 votes for Matthew Pruden 0.0%; 3 votes for Daví 0.0%; 1 vote for Randy Toler 0.0%; 1 vote for Robert Cooke 0.0%; 1 vote for Cornel West 0.0%; 1 vote for Angela Nicole Walker)	2.2% 376 votes 6 delegates

== Convention vote ==
The delegate votes as they were reported during the 2024 Green National Convention. Jill Stein Jasmine Sherman Dashaun "Daví" Davis Ajamu Baraka Randy Toler Uncommitted/NOTA

2024 Green National Convention presidential vote

Candidate	Delegates	Percentage
Jill Stein	267	91.13%
Jasmine Sherman	13	4.44%
Abstained/NOTA	10	3.41%
Dashaun "Daví" Davis	2	0.68%
Ajamu Baraka (write-in)	1/2	0.17%
Randy Toler	1/2	0.17%
Totals	293	100%

State	Delegate Votes			
State	Sherman	Stein	Other	None of the Above (Note: Also includes votes for "Uncommitted" and "Abstain")
Alabama	0	4	0	0
Arizona	1	3	0	0
California	0	50	0	0
Colorado	0	4	0	1
Connecticut	0	9	0	0
Delaware	0	4	0	0
District of Columbia	0	2	1 (Note: For Dashaun "Daví" Davis)	1
Florida	1	6	0.5 (Note: For Randy Toler)	0.5
Hawaii	0	4	0	0
Indiana	0	4	0	0
Iowa	0	4	0	0
Louisiana	0	4	0	0
Maine	0	26	0	0
Maryland	0	5	0	0
Massachusetts	0	8	0	0
Michigan	0	11	0.5 (Note: For Ajamu Baraka (not a candidate))	0.5
Minnesota	0	3	0	0
Mississippi	0	4	0	0
Missouri	0	6	0	0
Nevada	0	4	0	0
New Jersey	0	6	0	0
New Mexico	0	4	0	0
New York	1	9	0	0
North Carolina	1	3	0	1
Ohio	1	5	0	0
Oregon	2	9	0	0
Pennsylvania	3	10	0	0
South Carolina	0	3	0	5
Tennessee	1	3	0	0
Texas	1	18	0	0
Utah	0	4	0	0
Virginia	0	5	0	0
Washington	0	4	0	0
West Virginia	0	4	0	0
Wisconsin	1	3	0	0
Latinx Caucus	0	4	0	0
Black Caucus	0	2	1 (Note: For Dashaun "Daví" Davis)	1
Lavender Greens	0	4	0	0
Women's Caucus	0	2	0	0
Totals	13	267	3 (Note: 2 for Dashaun "Daví" Davis, 0.5 for Randy Toler, 0.5 for Ajamu Baraka (not a candidate))	10

== Major candidates ==
As of April 2024, at least 14 candidates have filed with the Federal Election Commission to run for the Green Party presidential nomination in 2024.

=== Declared candidates ===
This section includes declared candidates who have filed paperwork with the Federal Election Commission with intent to run under the Green Party who have received formal party recognition.

Green nominee for the 2024 presidential election
Name	Born	Experience	Home state	Campaign Announcement date	Contests won	Delegates	Popular vote	Running mate	Ref.
Jill Stein	May 14, 1950 (age 76); Chicago, Illinois	Nominee for president in 2012 and 2016; Member of the Lexington Town Meeting from the 2nd Precinct; Activist	Massachusetts	Campaign; November 9, 2023; FEC filing	20 (KS, PA, CA, IL, AZ, NY, WA, NV, TX, WI, CT, TN, OH, MD, NJ, NM, UT, WV, IN, DC)	Pledged: 182 (91.9%); Convention: 267 (91.1%)	16,597 (96.5%)	Butch Ware	

Other candidates in the 2024 Green Party presidential primaries
Name	Born	Experience	Home state	Campaign Announcement date	Contests won	Delegates	Popular vote	Running mate	Ref.
Other candidates formally recognized by GPUS
Jasmine Sherman	August 17, 1985 (age 41); Queens, New York	Executive Director of Greater Charlotte Rise	North Carolina	February 18, 2022; FEC filing	None	Pledged: 10 (5.1%); Convention: 13 (4.5%)	72 (0.4%)	Tanda Blubear	
Jorge Zevala	unknown	Businessman	California	October 13, 2023; FEC filing	None	None	18 (0.1%)		
Alternate ballot options:
None of the above	N/A				1 (MT)	Pledged: 6 (2.5%); Convention: 10 (3.4%)	505 (2.9%)		

=== Withdrew before the primaries ===
Former candidates in the 2024 Green Party presidential primaries
Name	Born	Experience	Home state	Campaign announced	Campaign suspended	Campaign	Popular Vote	Ref.
Emanuel Pastreich	October 16, 1964 (age 62); Nashville, Tennessee	President of the Asia Institute; Academic and author	Massachusetts	September 11, 2023	September 28, 2023 (running as an independent)	FEC filing		
Cornel West	June 2, 1953 (age 73); Tulsa, Oklahoma	Academic scholar and activist	California	June 14, 2023	October 5, 2023 (running as an independent)	Campaign FEC filing	1 (nil%)	

=== Other candidates ===
This section includes candidates that have at some point been considered active by the party's presidential campaign support committee or appeared on a ballot. Holding an active status does not mean the candidate has received official recognition from the party.

- Randy Toler, Co-chair of the Florida Green Party, disputed co-founder of the Green Party
- Robert Cooke IV, self-proclaimed prophet
- Dashaun "Daví" Davis, activist
- Adam Hollick

== Declined to be candidates ==
As of March 2024, the following notable individuals have been the subject of speculation about their possible candidacy, but have publicly denied interest in running.

- Howie Hawkins, party co-founder and Green/Socialist nominee for president in 2020

== Endorsements ==
Jill Stein

Organizations

- Socialist Alternative, socialist political party based in various cities (also endorsed West)
- Workers Strike Back

Notable individuals

- Lexi Alexander, film and television director
- Krystal Ball, political commentator, media host, former congressional candidate
- Ajamu Baraka, 2016 Green Party nominee for Vice President of the United States and spokesperson for the Black Alliance for Peace
- Medea Benjamin, political activist, co-founder of Code Pink
- Chris Hedges, journalist, author, commentator and Presbyterian minister
- TJ Kirk, New Atheist YouTuber known as "The Amazing Atheist"
- Kyle Kulinski, political commentator, media host
- Jeffery Sachs, economist, public policy analyst, professor at Columbia University
- Kshama Sawant, former Socialist Alternative member of Seattle City Council and founder of Workers Strike Back
Cornel West (withdrew)

Organizations

- Socialist Alternative, socialist political party based in various cities (later also endorsed Stein)

Notable individuals

- Peter Daou, political activist, musician, and author (West's co-campaign manager; previously campaign manager for Marianne Williamson's 2024 run and advisor for Hillary Clinton's 2016 run; Independent)
- ~~Jill Stein, physician and activist, 2012 and 2016 Green Party nominee for president (West's co-campaign manager)~~

== Timeline ==
Active campaigns
Withdrawn candidate
Midterm elections
Green convention
General election

== Debates and forums ==
Forums among candidates for the 2024 Green Party U.S. presidential nomination
Date	Place	Host	Participants				
P Participant. I Invitee. A Absent. N Confirmed non-invitee. O Out of race (exploring, suspended, or not yet entered)			Davis	Sherman	Stein	Zavala	Others
January 12, 2024	Virtual	Kansas Green Party	P	P	A	P	P (Note: Adam Hollick)
January 20, 2024	Worcester, MA	Green-Rainbow Party	P	P	P	P (Note: Participated virtually)	P (Note: Randy Toler participated virtually)
January 23, 2024	Philadelphia, PA	Green Party of Philadelphia	P	P	P	P	A (Note: Randy Toler was advertised as a participant)
February 20, 2024	Virtual	Green Party of New York	N	P	A (Note: Could not attend due to illness but was represented by her campaign manager)	P	N

== Campaign finance ==
According to campaign finance laws, an individual must begin filing reports once they raise or spend more than $5,000. This fundraising table includes money raised and spent as of June 30, 2024.

Overview of campaign financing for candidates in the 2024 Green Party presidential primariesthrough June 30, 2024
Candidate	Total raised	Total raised since last quarter	Individual contributions			Debt	Spent	Spent since last quarter	COH
Candidate	Total raised	Total raised since last quarter	Total	Unitemized	Pct	Debt	Spent	Spent since last quarter	COH
Stein	$1,460,305.63	$856,880.84	$1,371,593.70	$46,235.00	3.37%	$43,010	$1,303,802.66	$831,183.77	$172,835.55
Sherman	$28,392.29	$10,738.22	$28,392.29	$13,921.00	49.03%	$0	$28,765.82	$19,363.75	$109.13
Zavala; 11/30/2023	$5,785.00	—	$5,710.00	$75.00	1.30%	$0	$3,347.09	—	$1,811.11

== Schedule ==
Delegate allocating contests in the 2024 Green Party presidential primaries
Date	Del.	Primaries/caucuses	Ref
February 5 (Note: Voting begins January 22)	4	Kansas primary (party-run)	
March 4 (Note: Voting begins February 14)	14	Pennsylvania primary (party-run)	
March 5	59	California primary (state-run)	
March 16 (Note: Voting begins March 2)	20	Illinois primary (party-run)	
March 19 (Note: Voting begins February 19)	4	Arizona primary (party-run)	
March 23	14	New York convention	
March 24 (Note: Voting begins March 3)	4	Washington primary (party-run)	
March 25	4	Nevada convention	
April 13	19	Texas convention	
April 22	4	Wisconsin primary (party-run)	
April 26	10	Connecticut primary (party-run)	
April 27	4	Tennessee primary (party-run)	
April 29 (Note: Voting begins March 23)	6	Ohio primary (party-run) (Note: Ohio primary was held online (electronic voting))	
May 3 (Note: voting began April 12)	5	Maryland primary (party-run)	
May 4	6	New Jersey primary (party-run) (Note: the New Jersey vote was held at the party's state convention)	
May 4	4	New Mexico convention	
May 5	33	Maine caucuses and convention	
May 10 (Note: Voting begins May 1)	4	Utah primary (party-run)	
May 11	8	South Carolina convention	
May 14	4	West Virginia primary (state-run)	
May 25	11	Oregon convention	
May 30 (Note: Voting begins May 24)	4	Indiana primary (party-run)	
June 4	5	District of Columbia primary (state-run)	
June 4	4	Montana primary (state-run)	
July 15	25	Michigan poll	
July 31	9	Florida poll	
August 15 – 18	Convention		

=== Ballot access ===
The following is a table of which candidates received ballot access in which states.
Yes indicates that the candidate was on the ballot for the primary contest
indicates that the candidate was a recognized write-in candidate
No indicates that the candidate did not appear on the ballot in that state's contest.
indicates that a candidate withdrew before the election but was still listed on the ballot.
States not listed in the table did not hold Green Party presidential primaries.

Ballot access in the 2024 Green presidential nominating contests
State	Date	Sherman	Stein	Zavala	Others	NOTA (Note: Includes 'No Preference', 'Uncommitted', and 'None of the Above')	Ref
KS	February 5	Yes	Yes	Yes	Yes (Note: Adam Hollick, Randy Toler)	Yes	
PA	March 4	Yes	Yes	Yes	(Note: All write-ins were counted)	Yes	
CA	March 5	No	Yes	Write-in	(Note: DaShaun Davis, Matthew Pruden)	No	
IL	March 16	Yes	Yes	Yes	No	Yes	
AZ	March 19	Yes	Yes	Yes	No	No	
NY	March 23	Yes	Yes	Yes	No	No	
WA	March 24	Yes	Yes	Yes	(Note: All write-ins were counted)	No	
TX	April 13	Yes	Yes	Yes	Yes (Note: DaShaun Davis, Randy Toler, Robert Cooke)	No	
WI	April 22	Yes	Yes	Yes	No	No	
CT	April 26	Yes	Yes	Yes	(Note: All write-ins were counted)	Yes	
TN	April 27	Yes	Yes	Yes	Yes (Note: DaShaun Davis, Randy Toler)	No	
OH	April 29	Yes	Yes	Yes	Yes (Note: DaShaun Davis, Randy Toler)	No	
MD	May 3	Yes	Yes	Yes	No	No	
ME (caucuses)	May 5	Ballot access not required					
UT	May 10	Yes	Yes	Yes	No	No	
WV	May 14	No	Yes	No	No	No	
IN	May 30	Yes	Yes	Yes	Yes (Note: DaShaun Davis, Robert Cooke IV, Randy Toler)	Yes	
DC	Jun 4	No	Write-in	No	No	No	
MT	Jun 4	No	No	No	No	Yes	
MI	Jul 15	Yes	Yes	Yes	Yes (Note: DaShaun Davis, Robert Cooke IV, Randy Toler)	No	
FL	Jul 30	Yes	Yes	Yes	Yes (Note: DaShaun Davis, Robert Cooke IV, Randy Toler)	No	

== See also ==
- 2024 Green National Convention
- Third party and independent candidates for the 2024 United States presidential election
- 2024 Democratic Party presidential primaries
- 2024 Republican Party presidential primaries
- 2024 Libertarian Party presidential primaries
- 2024 Constitution Party presidential primaries
- 2024 United States presidential election
