= Randy Toler =

American activist and disputed Green Party founder

- Toler in 1984
- Born: c. 1956 (age c. 70); Elgin, Illinois, United States
- Known for: Founding of the Green Party of the United States (disputed); Anti-nuclear power activist and environmentalist
- Political party: Green
- Spouse: Alicia Toler
- Children: 3

Randall "Randy" Toler (born c. 1956) is an American anti-nuclear power activist, perennial candidate, computer technician, and environmentalist. He is credited with founding a green party in Michigan when he was 17 years old, but its connection to the national party is disputed by the Green Party's official account. Toler is a former co-chair of the Green Party of Florida.

Toler ran for school board in Hillsborough County, Florida in 2014 and 2016, losing both elections. He unsuccessfully ran in the 2024 Green Party presidential primaries, receiving 1 vote in the primaries and 1/2 a delegate at the 2024 Green National Convention. He has declared his candidacy for the 2028 Green Party presidential primary. He has claimed to have run for many other offices, including Mayor of Chicago, Governor, and US Congress.

== Founding of the Green Party of the United States ==
Toler has claimed to have founded what is now the Green Party of the United States as a teenager in the 1970s while living in Niles, Michigan. According to Toler, the party stuck mostly to the west coast for its first few years, with its largest branch in Chicago. In 1983, the party went national, opting to endorse Walter Mondale's unsuccessful presidential run instead of supporting the proposed candidacy of John Anderson. This led to a conflict with the Citizen's Party over which party would represent the US Green Party abroad. Toler's party was often in dispute with the Green Party of California.

Toler's account has been disputed. The Green Party's official account credits Alan Philbrook and John Rensenbrink for founding the Maine Green Party in 1984, which led to the national party being organized several years later. Howie Hawkins stated that Toler's Green Party was "just one guy" and that he had "conned the media many times."

== Activism ==
Toler has been described as an "anti-nuclear" activist. In 1987, he attempted to recall Rolling Meadows mayor William Ahrens, but was denounced by many local politicians as an extremist. That same year he organized a protest against Amerika, a television series.

In the early 2000s, Toler and his faction of the Green Party led opposition to an Illinois toll law.

=== Lawsuits ===
Toler sued the Newport Beach police chief in 1983 for $700 due to a high police presence outside of a Green Party fundraiser. A spokesman for the police department denied any intention to monitor the group, instead citing concerns that alcohol would be served to minors at the event. The lawsuit was dismissed by a judge.

In 1986, he sued a LaRouche movement-affiliated newspaper for $4 million due to slanderous statements made about the Green Party and their policy positions on drug legalization.

== Electoral history ==
=== 1984 congressional campaign ===
Toler declared his candidacy for California's 43rd congressional district on January 14, 1984 as a Democrat, having initially wanted to run against William Dannemeyer in the 39th district. Toler lost the primary.

1984 California's 43rd District Democratic Primary
Party	Candidate	Votes	%
Democratic	Lois E. Humphreys	20,679	55.72%
Democratic	Kevin Schmidt	9,913	26.71
Democratic	Randy Toler	6,519	17.57%
Total votes		37,111	100%

=== 1992 and 1996 presidential elections ===
Toler declared himself as a candidate for president in 1992, he did not campaign and was not on any state's ballot. In 1996, he was a critical opponent of Ralph Nader's presidential candidacy.

=== Illinois politics ===
Toler ran for mayor of Rolling Meadows in 1997 and 2001, but failed to make the ballot in either election.

=== 2014 school board ===
Toler ran for school board for Hillsborough County Public Schools district on a platform calling for greater resources for students in special education. He finished in 6th place.

2014 Hillsborough County Public Schools District 6
Party	Candidate	Votes	%	±%
Nonpartisan	April Griffen (incumbent)	31,272	27%	N/A
Nonpartisan	Dipa Shah	19,022	16.4%	N/A
Nonpartisan	Stacy Hahn	18,214	15.7%	N/A
Nonpartisan	Paula P. Meckley	17,050	14.7%	N/A
Nonpartisan	Allison McGillivray Fernandez	14,441	12.5%	N/A
Nonpartisan	Randy Toler	7,587	6.5%	N/A
Nonpartisan	Lee Sierra	5,044	4.4%	N/A
Nonpartisan	Asher D. Edelson	3,302	2.8%	N/A

=== 2016 school board ===
Toler ran again for school board, calling for ending bureaucracy and the elimination of Common Core, in addition to increased resources for special needs kids. His wife, Alica, also ran for a different school board seat. He finished in 5th place, while his wife also lost her election.

2016 Hillsborough County Public Schools District 7
Party	Candidate	Votes	%	±%
Nonpartisan	Catherine James	31,436	23.08%	N/A
Nonpartisan	Lynn Gray	26,795	19.67%	N/A
Nonpartisan	Stanley Gray	18,716	13.74%	N/A
Nonpartisan	Alan Clendenin	15,731	11.55%	N/A
Nonpartisan	Randy Toler	14,444	10.60%	N/A
Nonpartisan	Joseph Caetano	10,800	7.93%	N/A
Nonpartisan	Carlos Frontela	9,244	6.79%	N/A
Nonpartisan	Norene Miller	9,051	6.64%	N/A

=== 2024 presidential campaign ===
Toler filed paperwork to run for president in August 2021, but did not campaign for the office until July 2023. His platform called for "putting the green back in Green Party." During the primary cycle, he received a single vote in Texas. He received only a half delegate vote during the convention roll call. Toler appeared at a Green Party debate in Worcester, Massachusetts.

He has also filed paperwork to run for US Senate in Florida.

=== 2028 presidential campaign ===
Toler has declared his candidacy for the presidency in the 2028 Green Party primaries, once again using the slogan "Put the green back in the Green Party" and emphasizing the need for a competitive Green Party in the wake of the reelection of Donald Trump and the 2025 Los Angeles wildfires.

== Personal life ==
Toler was born in Elgin, Illinois and grew up in Niles, Michigan. He attended the University of Missouri. He has three kids with his wife Alica. Toler married Alicia Kirk in 1999, when he was 43 and when she was 19. At the time, she was a retail clerk at a clothing store and wanted to become a model. Their marriage caused controversy, as Kirk had just turned 18 years old when they became engaged.
