= 2028 United States presidential election =

- November 7, 2028

538 members of the Electoral College 270 electoral votes needed to win
Party	Republican	Democratic
- 2028 electoral map, based on the results of the 2020 census
Incumbent President
Donald Trump
Republican

A presidential election is scheduled to be held in the United States on November 7, 2028, to elect the president and vice president to a four-year term. The winners are scheduled to be inaugurated on January 20, 2029.

Incumbent Republican president Donald Trump is ineligible to run for a third term due to the term limits established by the Twenty-second Amendment to the United States Constitution. As a result, this will be the first election since 2012 where Trump is not the Republican nominee, the first since 2016 in which no candidates on the ballot are seeking reelection to the presidency, and the first since 1884 where an incumbent president is not on the ballot in two consecutive elections, following incumbent president Joe Biden's absence from the ballot in 2024.

== Background ==
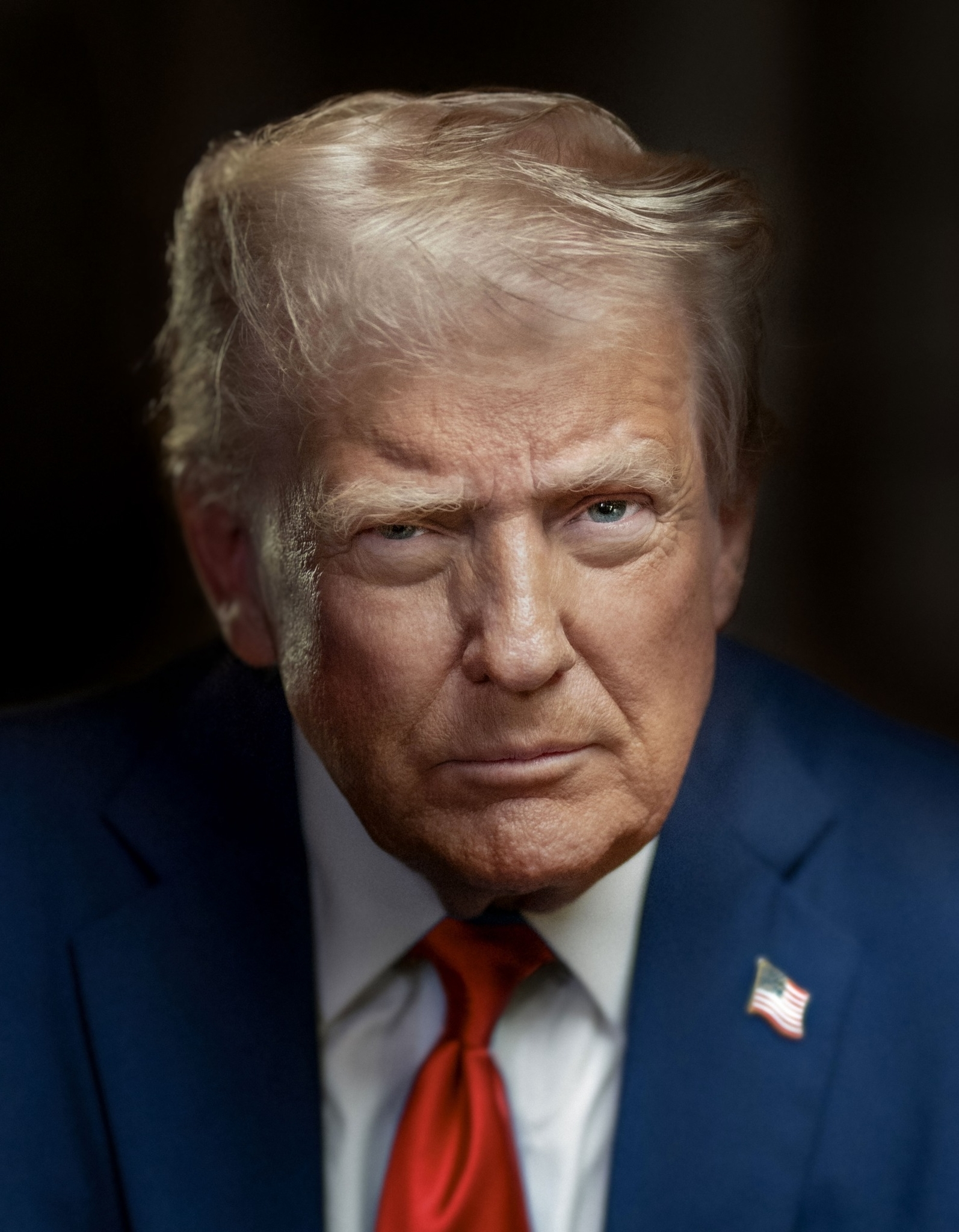
Donald Trump, the incumbent president, whose non-consecutive second term will expire at noon on January 20, 2029

The Republican Party returned to power in the United States in January 2025 with a government trifecta—controlling the Senate, House of Representatives, and the presidency—following the 2024 elections. Donald Trump, who was elected president in 2016 before losing a re-election bid in 2020 to Joe Biden, defeated Vice President Kamala Harris, who immediately began her campaign following Biden's withdrawal from his re-election bid. Trump's victory was attributed to a post-pandemic surge in inflation, (Note: Attributed to multiple sources:) and a migrant crisis at the US–Mexico border, (Note: Attributed to multiple sources:) amidst the global anti-incumbent backlash. In March 2024, the Supreme Court unanimously ruled in Trump v. Anderson that Trump could seek office after challenges to his ballot eligibility were raised by several state attorneys general.

JD Vance, a U.S. senator from Ohio, was selected as Trump's running mate and subsequently elected vice president.

In addition, Republicans secured control of the Senate, flipping four seats and earning a three-seat majority, while also retaining a House majority, though the party's majority narrowed to three seats after losing two seats.

== Electoral system ==
The president and vice president of the United States are elected through the Electoral College, determined by the number of senators and representatives with an additional three representatives for Washington, D.C. A majority of 270 votes is needed to win the election. 48 states use a winner-take-all system, in which states award all of their electors to the winner of the popular vote. In Maine and Nebraska, two votes are allocated to the winner of the popular vote, while each of the individual congressional districts have one vote. Electoral votes are cast by state electors in December and are counted by Congress on January 6. Presidential candidates are selected in a presidential primary, conducted through primary elections run by state governments or caucuses run by state parties which bind convention delegates to candidates. A brokered convention occurs when a candidate does not receive a majority of votes on the first round of voting, or when a candidate withdraws.

Election Day in the United States is held on the first Tuesday that falls after the first Monday in November. The 2028 presidential election will occur on November 7, 2028.

=== Eligibility ===
The United States Constitution limits occupancy of the presidency to individuals who are at least thirty-five, who have been a resident in the United States for at least fourteen years, and who are a natural-born citizen. Section three of the Fourteenth Amendment prevents current and former federal, state, and military officials from holding office—including the presidency—if they have "engaged in insurrection or rebellion" against the United States. A convicted felon may serve as president. Incumbent president Trump, along with former presidents Bill Clinton, George W. Bush, and Barack Obama, are ineligible to be elected to a third term, as the Twenty-second Amendment prohibits any person from being elected president more than twice.

==== Trump's suggestions on running for a third term ====
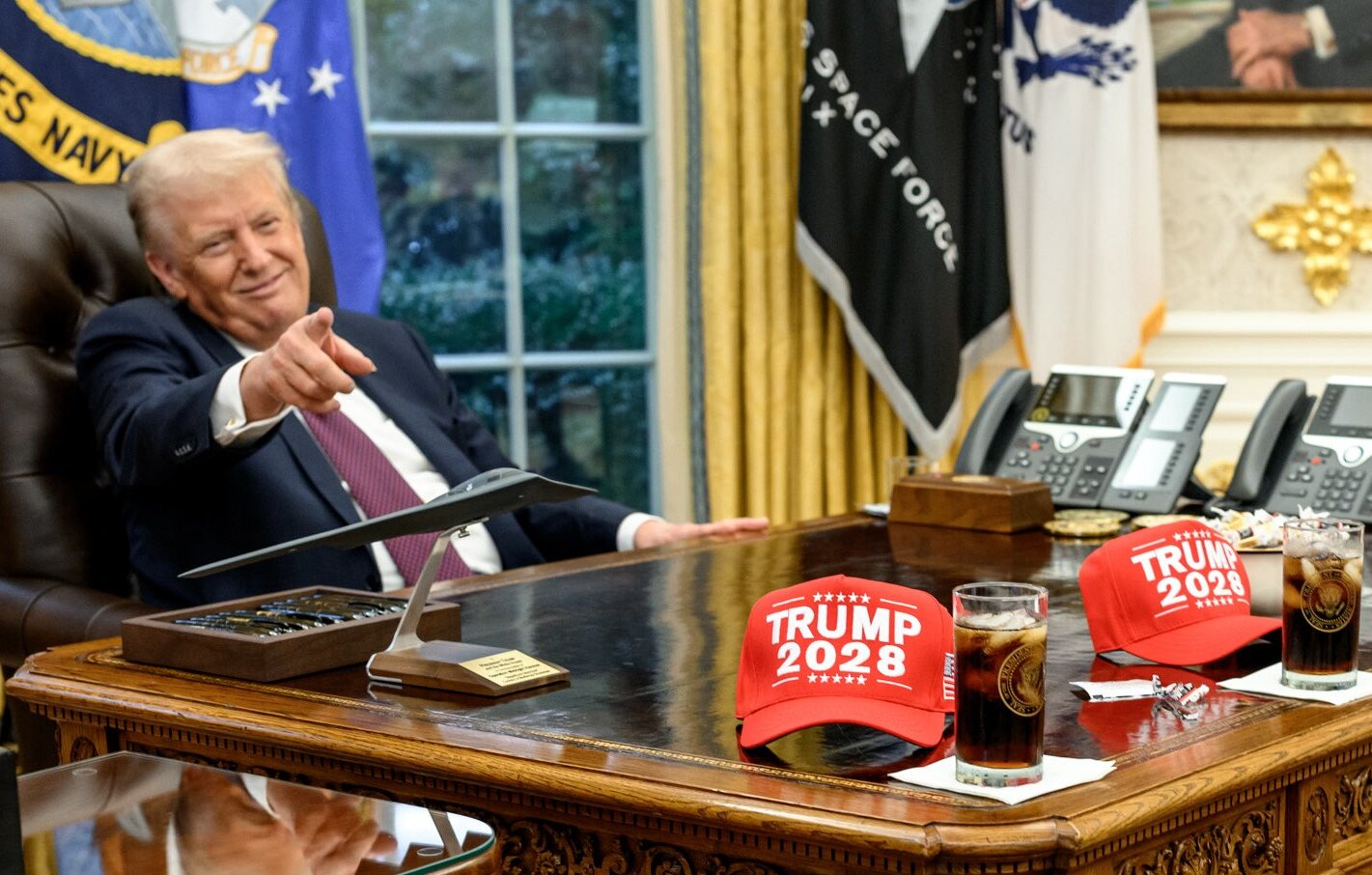
Trump meeting Democratic congressional leaders in September 2025, with Trump 2028 hats displayed

Since beginning his second term in January 2025, Trump has floated the possibility of seeking a third term. On October 27, 2025, when asked about a third term by a reporter on Air Force One, Trump said that he would "love to do it". Trump did rule out a run for vice president, stating that it "wouldn't be right". A hypothetical third term would give Trump four additional years as president after 2028, going through the 2032 United States presidential election, and ending on January 20, 2033; however, the possibility of a third term is unconstitutional under the Twenty-second Amendment, barring all former and current presidents from seeking more than two terms in office. If Trump intends to have the amendment repealed, he would have to either require approval from two-thirds of both the House of Representatives and the Senate, or he would need a constitutional convention called by two-thirds of state legislatures, a process viewed by experts as extremely unlikely.

=== Electoral map ===
This map shows how partisan states are by the Cook Partisan Voting Index. Swing states are the states in lighter colors.

Most US states are usually not highly competitive in presidential elections, often voting consistently for the same party due to longstanding demographic and ideological differences. In the Electoral College, this results in major-party candidates primarily focusing their campaigns on swing states, which can swing between parties from election to election. These states are critical for a presidential candidate's path to victory.

Before the 2026 midterm elections, the 2028 swing states widely agreed by pundits were the Rust Belt states of Pennsylvania, Wisconsin, and Michigan, the Sun Belt states of Arizona, Georgia, Nevada, and North Carolina and the New England state of New Hampshire, with all except for New Hampshire having narrowly voted for Trump in 2024 and all except for North Carolina having narrowly voted for Joe Biden in 2020. Some pundits also speculated that New Jersey and Minnesota would become swing states due to their sharp rightward shift in 2024. Conversely, the formerly considered swing states of Florida, Iowa, and Ohio were now seen as solidly Republican states as they voted for Trump in all three of his previous election bids. Similarly, Maine's 2nd congressional district, which awards 1 electoral vote, has not voted Democratic in any statewide race since 2012 and is now considered a solid red district.

In the 2026 Senate elections, Democrats flipped Iowa, Ohio, Texas, Kansas, Mississippi and South Carolina, all of which Trump won by 10 percentage points or more two years prior. Additionally, Democrats came close to winning the Senate and Gubernatorial races in Florida, signaling a shift back towards being competitive. Analysts and pundits believe these and other usually Republican states could potentially become swing states in 2028.

== Republican Party primaries ==
=== Declared ===
Candidate	Born	Most recent position	Home state	Campaign announced	Campaign	Ref
Dan Greaney	September 28, 1964 (age 62); Duxbury, Massachusetts	Television writer	California	May 26, 2026	FEC filing Website	
Royce White	April 10, 1991 (age 35); Minneapolis, Minnesota	Republican nominee for U.S. Senate from Minnesota in 2024	Minnesota	August 12, 2026	FEC filing	

=== Exploratory committee ===
Candidate	Born	Experience	State	Exploratory committee announced	Ref
Gregory Bovino	March 27, 1970 (age 56); San Bernardino County, California	Commander-at-large of U.S. Border Patrol (2025–2026)	California	June 8, 2026	

=== Expressed interest ===
Individuals who have expressed an interest in running for the Republican presidential nomination (Note: Individuals listed below have, as of October 2026, personally expressed an interest in seeking the 2028 Republican Party presidential nomination in at least two reliable media sources in the last six months.)
Representative
Don Bacon
from Nebraska
(2017–present)

Former Governor
Chris Christie
of New Jersey
(2010–2018)

Senator
Ted Cruz
from Texas
(2013–present)

Governor
Ron DeSantis
of Florida
(2019–present)

Senator
Josh Hawley
from Missouri
(2019–present)

Senator
John Kennedy
from Louisiana
(2017–present)

Senator
Rand Paul
from Kentucky
(2011–present)

Former Vice President
Mike Pence
from Indiana
(2017–2021)

Vice President
JD Vance
from Ohio
(2025–present)

=== Speculated by the media ===
Potential Republican candidates (Note: Individuals listed below have, as of October 2026, been mentioned as potential 2028 presidential candidates in at least two reliable media sources in the last six months.)
Senator
Tom Cotton
from Arkansas
(2015–present)

Governor
Brian Kemp
of Georgia
(2019–present)

Representative
Thomas Massie
from Kentucky
(2012–present)

Former Personnel Director
John McEntee
from Connecticut
(2020–2021)

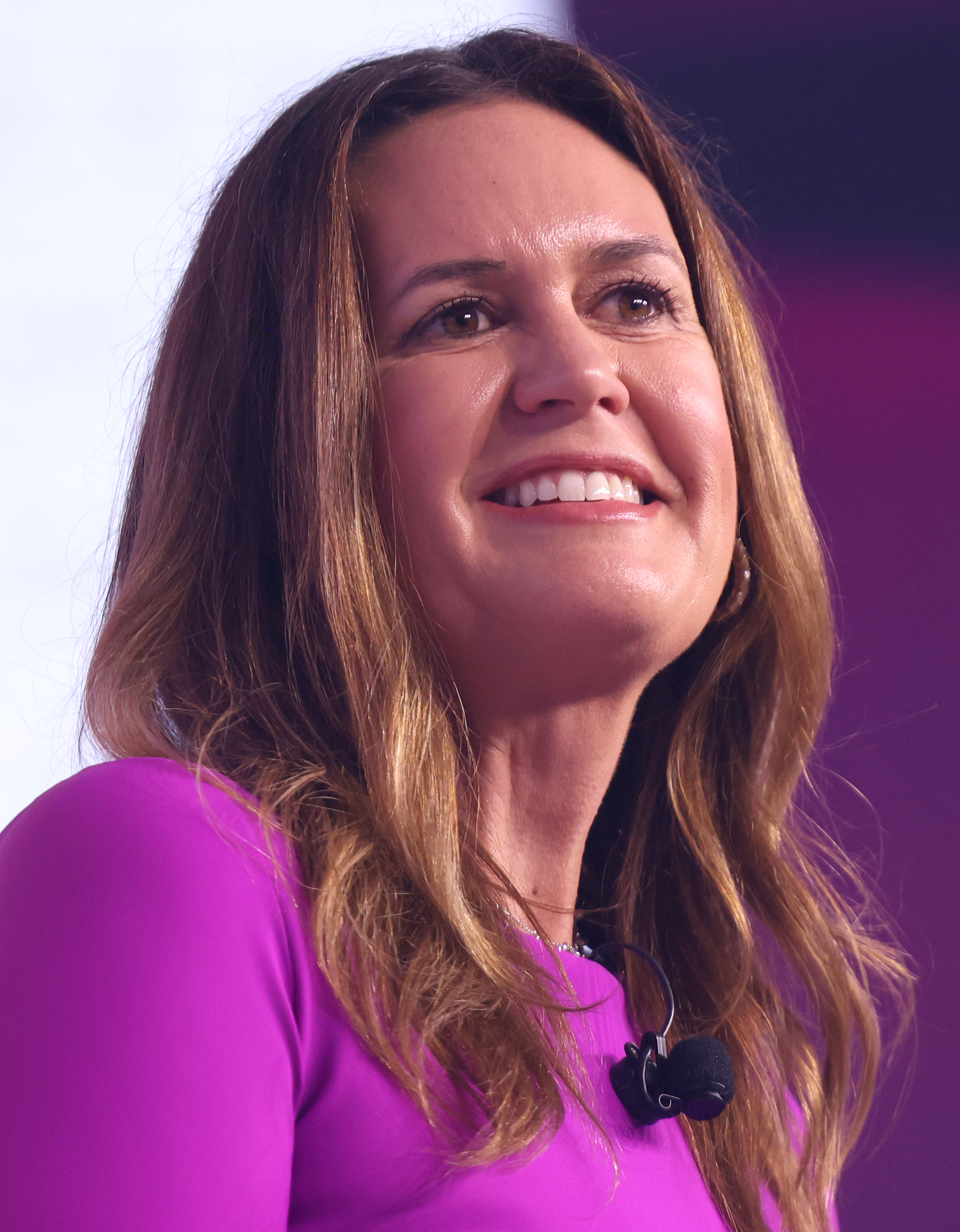
Governor
Sarah Huckabee Sanders
of Arkansas
(2023–present)

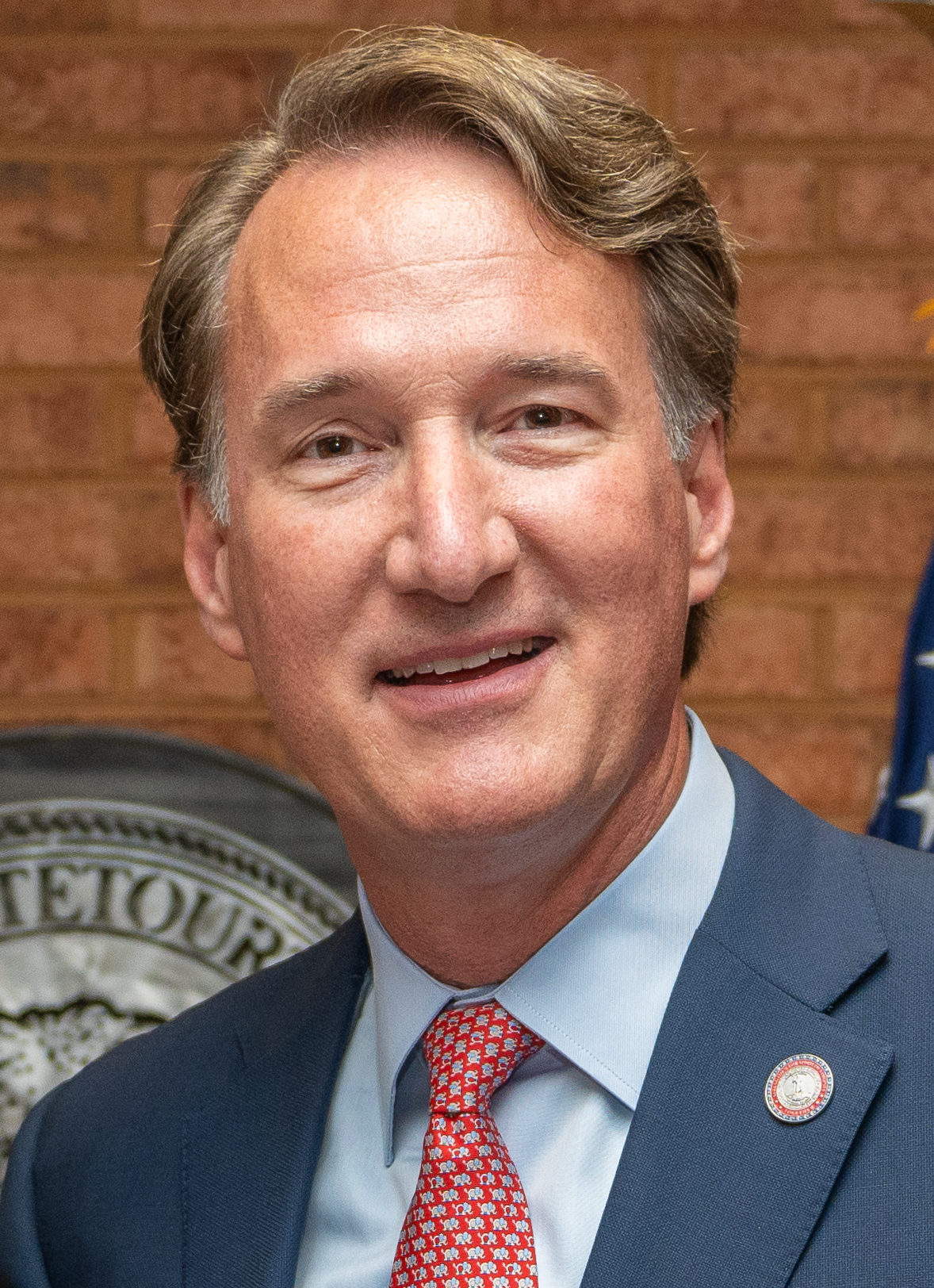
Former Governor
Glenn Youngkin
of Virginia
(2022–2026)

== Democratic Party primaries ==
=== Other Candidates ===
Candidate	Born	Most recent position	Home state	Campaign
Daryl W. Scott	Unknown	2022 Democratic nominee for South Carolina's 7th congressional district	South Carolina	Website

=== Expressed interest ===
Individuals who have expressed an interest in running for the Democratic presidential nomination (Note: Individuals listed below have, as of October 2026, personally expressed an interest in seeking the 2028 Democratic Party presidential nomination in at least two reliable media sources in the last six months.)
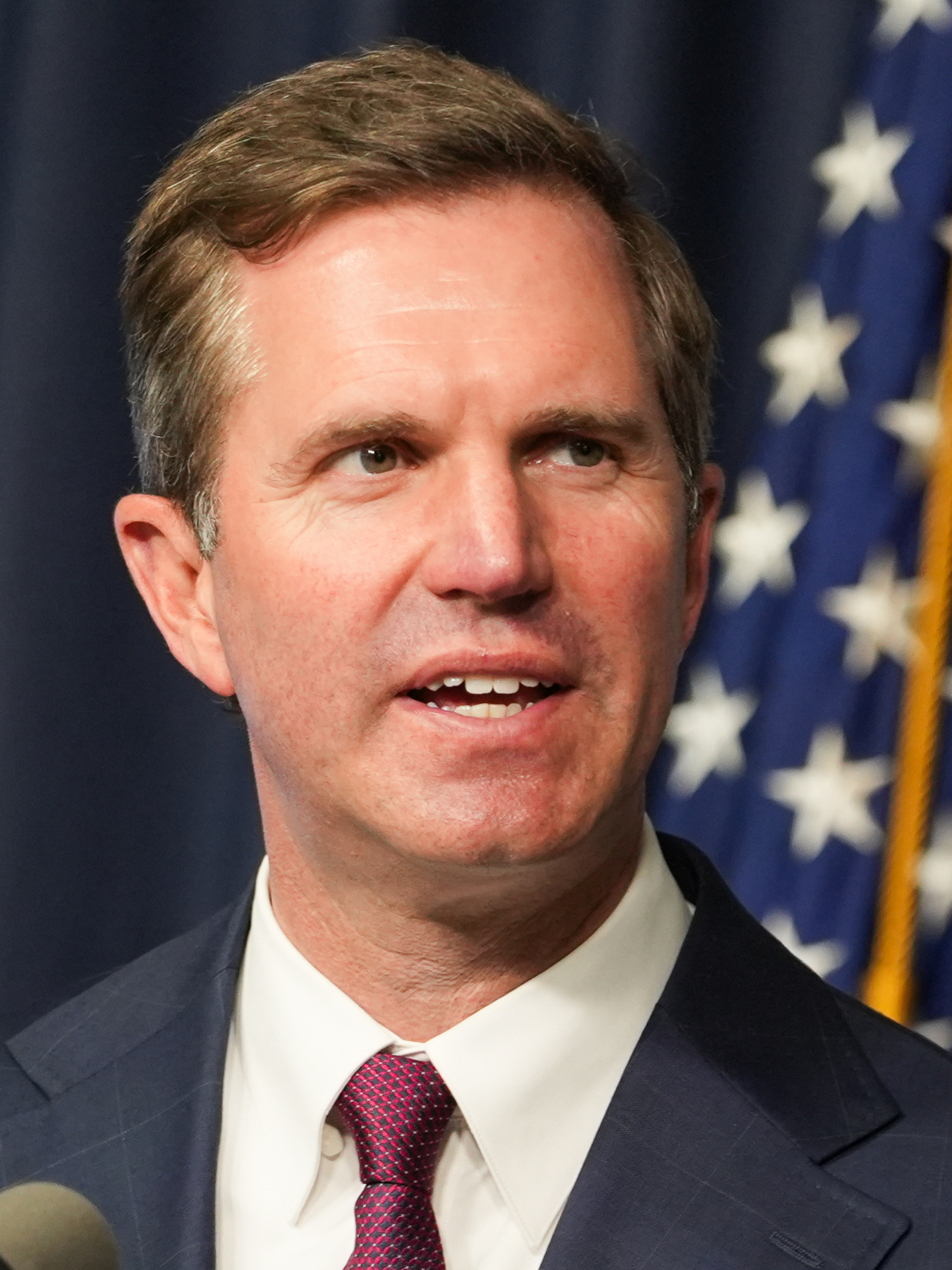
Governor
Andy Beshear
of Kentucky
(2019–present)

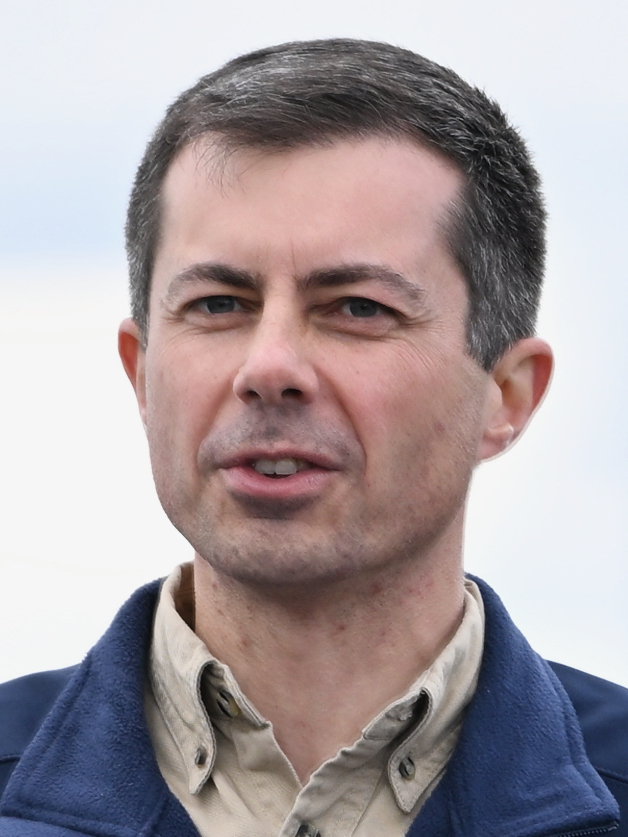
Former Secretary of Transportation
Pete Buttigieg
from Michigan
(2021–2025)

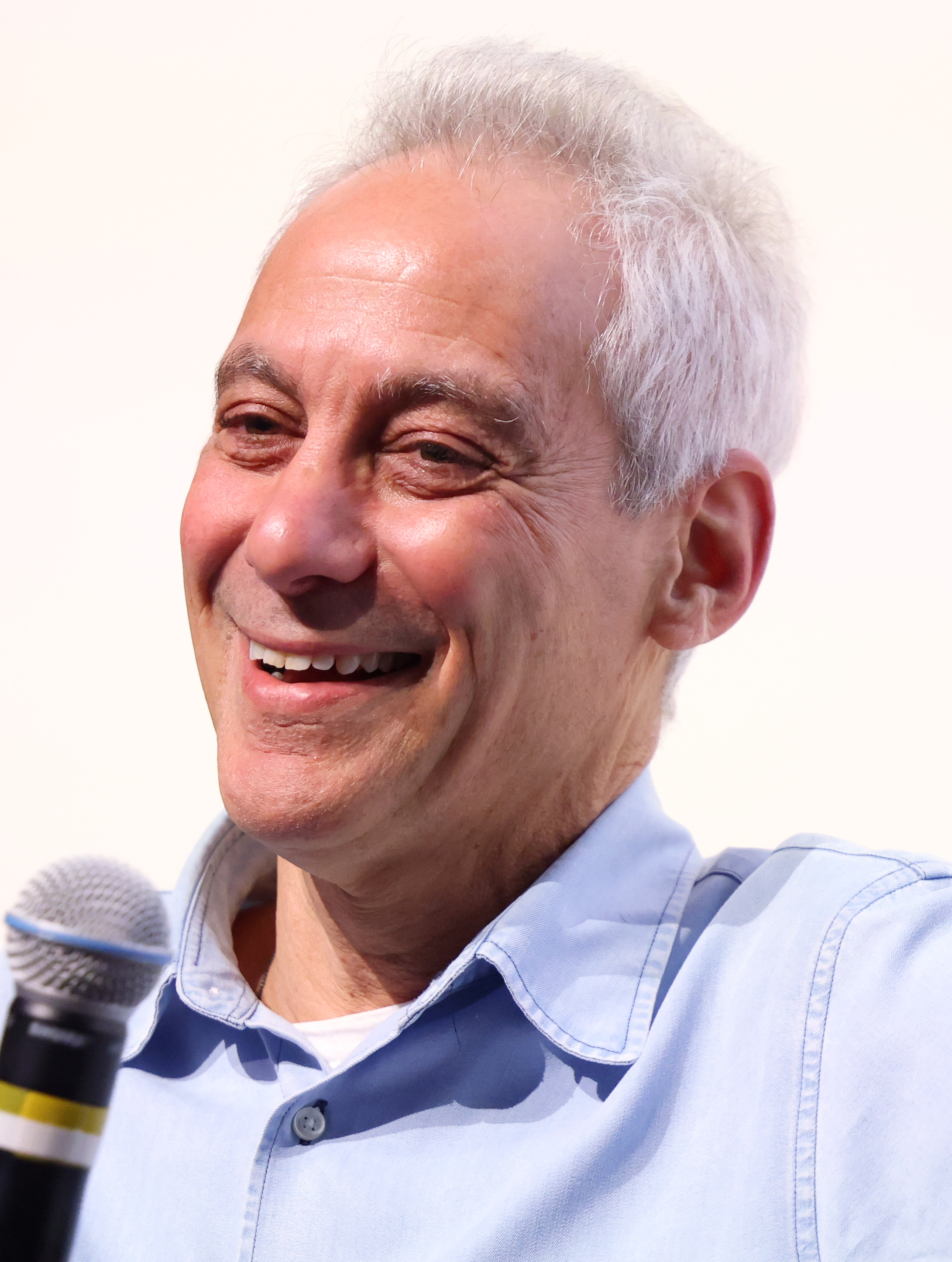
Former Ambassador
Rahm Emanuel
from Illinois
(2022–2025)

Senator
Ruben Gallego
from Arizona
(2025–present)

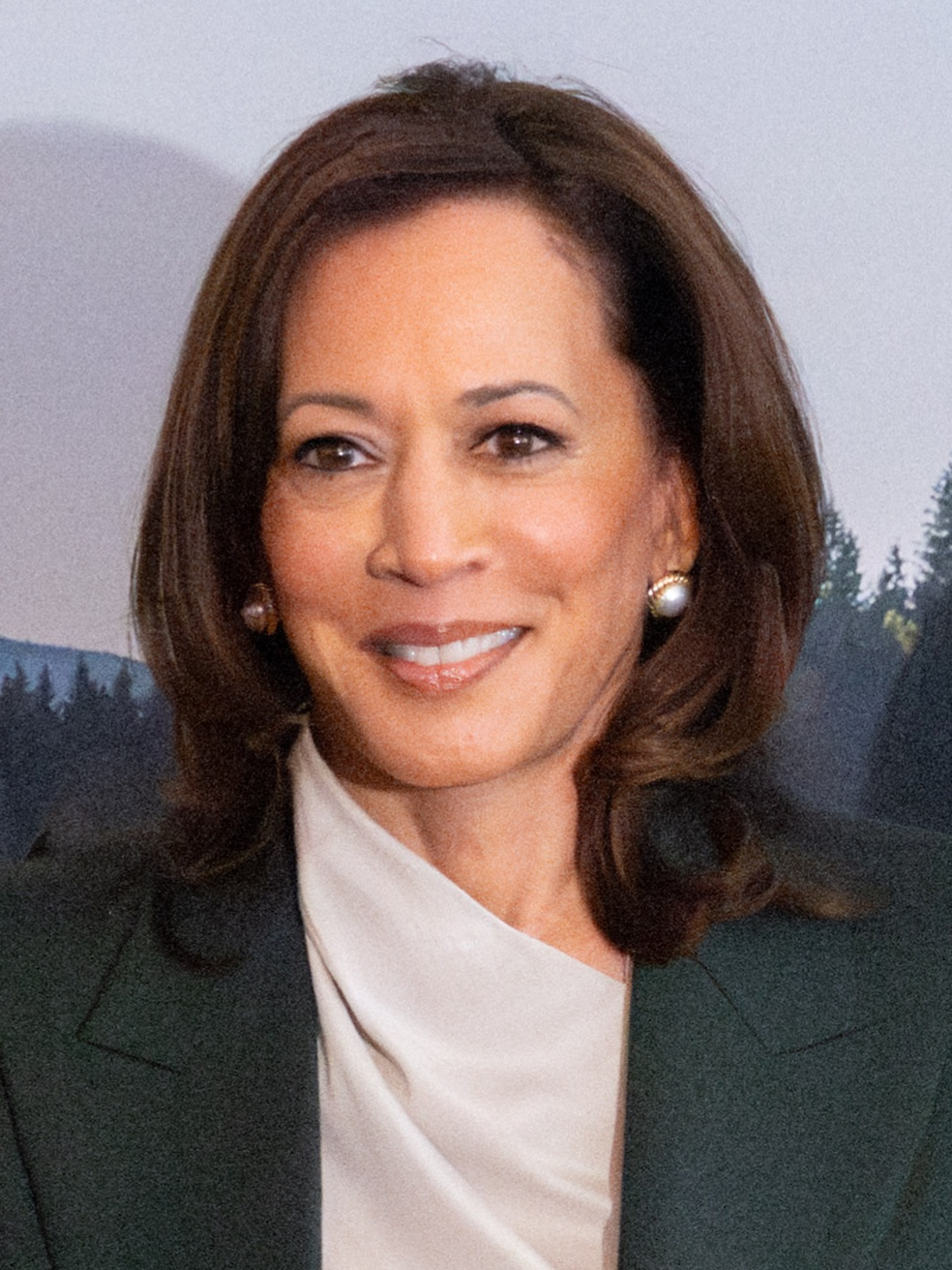
Former vice president and 2024 Democratic presidential nominee
Kamala Harris
from California
(2021–2025)

Senator
Mark Kelly
from Arizona
(2020–present)

Representative
Ro Khanna
from California
(2017–present)

Political commentator
Don Lemon
from New York

Governor
Gavin Newsom
of California
(2019–present)
(decision expected in early January 2027; will not run if Harris runs)

Representative
Alexandria Ocasio-Cortez
from New York
(2019–present)

Senator
Elissa Slotkin
from Michigan
(2025–present)

Governor
Gretchen Whitmer
of Michigan
(2019–present)

=== Speculated by the media ===
Potential Democratic candidates (Note: Individuals listed below have, as of October 2026, been mentioned as potential 2028 presidential candidates in at least two reliable media sources in the last six months.)
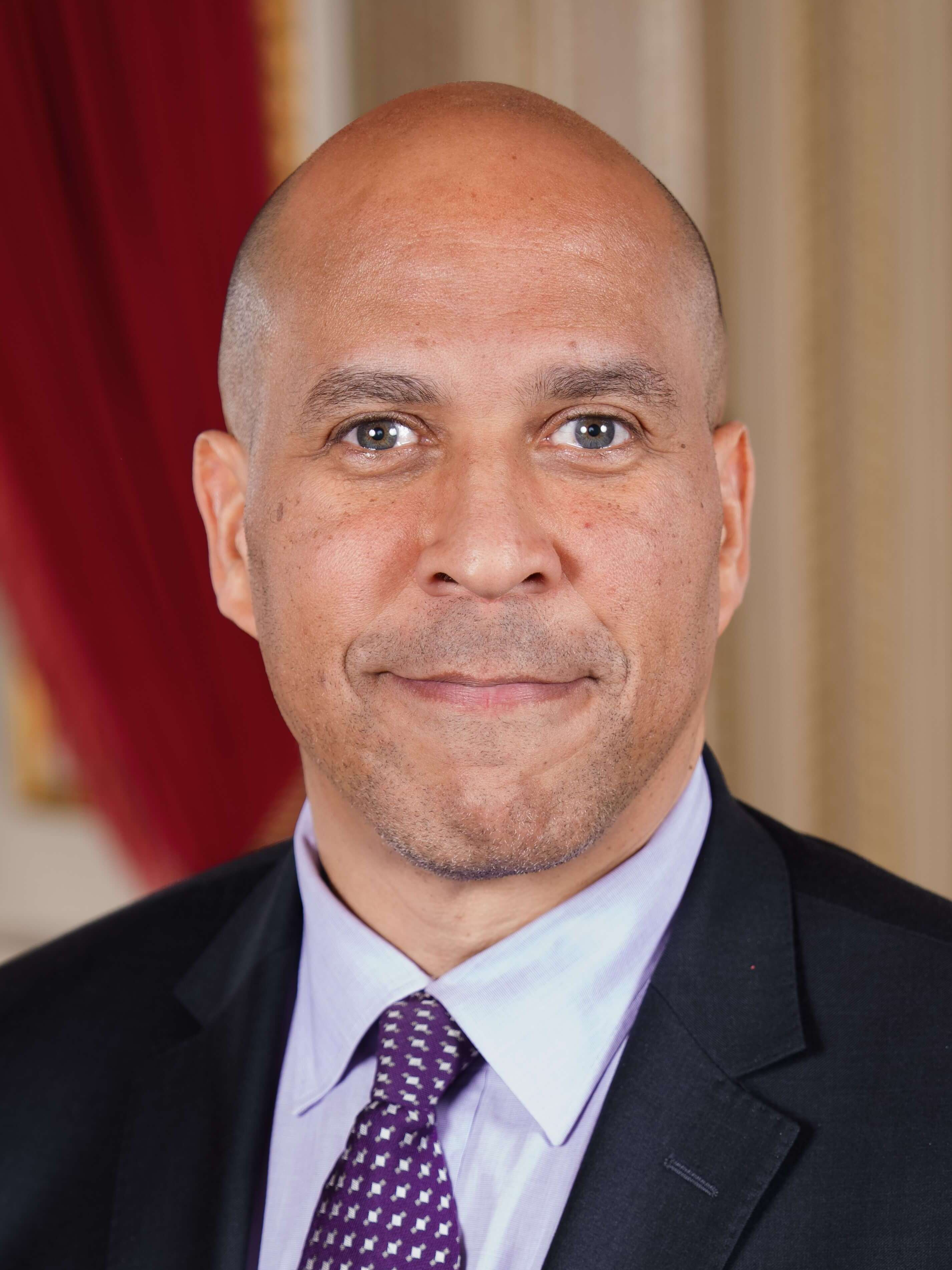
Senator
Cory Booker
from New Jersey
(2013–present)

Former Representative
Brad Carson
from Oklahoma
(2001–2005)

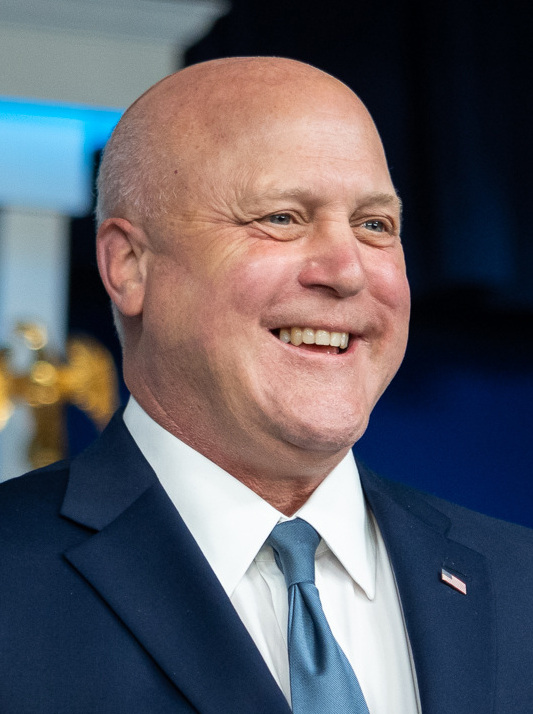
Former Mayor
Mitch Landrieu
of Louisiana
(2010–2018)

Governor
Wes Moore
of Maryland
(2023–present)

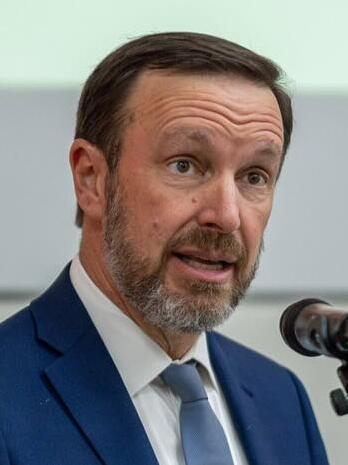
Senator
Chris Murphy
from Connecticut
(2013–present)

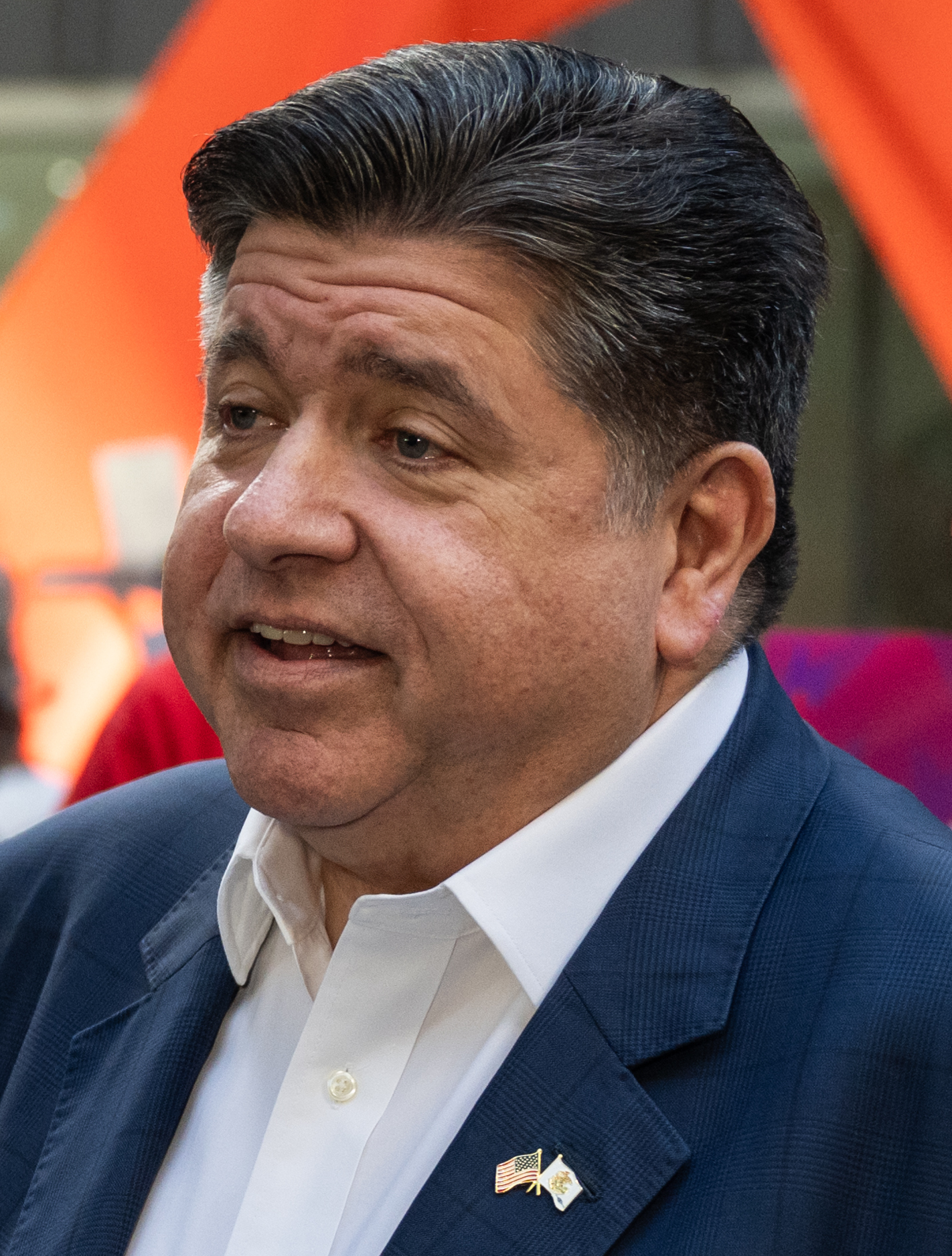
Governor
JB Pritzker
of Illinois
(2019–present)

Representative
Jamie Raskin
from Maryland
(2017–present)

Governor
Josh Shapiro
of Pennsylvania
(2023–present)

Senator
Raphael Warnock
from Georgia
(2021–present)

== Third-party and independent candidates ==
=== Candidates ===
==== Forward Party ====
===== Expressed interest =====
Individuals who have expressed an interest in running for the Forward presidential nomination (Note: Individuals listed below have, as of June 2026, personally expressed an interest in running for president in 2028 in at least two reliable media sources in the last six months.)
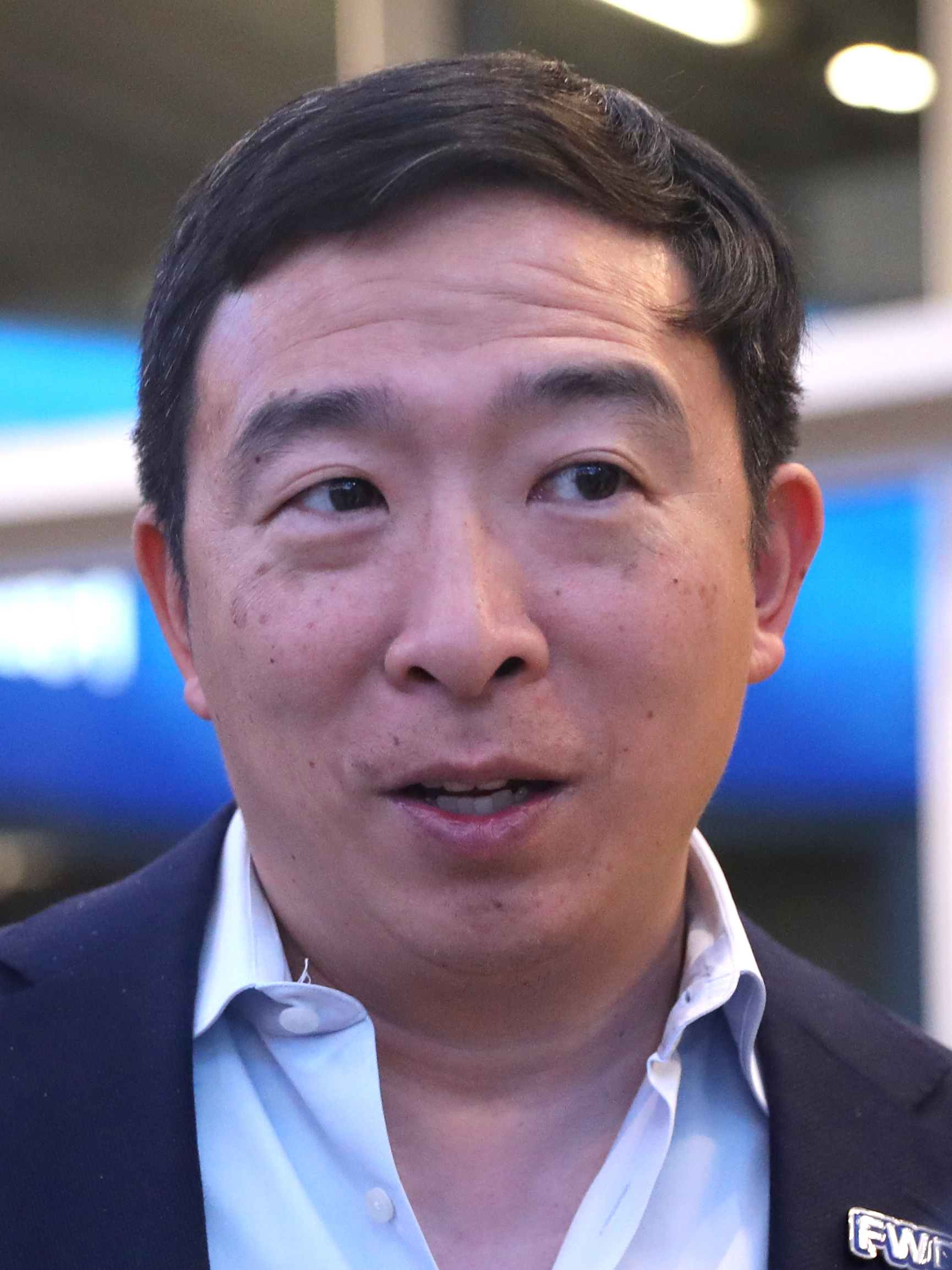
Entrepreneur
Andrew Yang
from New York

====== Andrew Yang ======
Andrew Yang is a businessman and political activist who sought the Democratic Party's presidential nomination in 2020. He later founded the Forward Party. In an April 2026 interview with The New York Times, Yang said that he was "still bent out of shape" over the Democratic Party's treatment of former congressman Dean Phillips, who ran an unsuccessful campaign against Biden for the Democratic Party's presidential nomination in 2024. He stated in a June 2026 interview with Yahoo Finance that he was "willing to serve" and... "we'll have to see what 2028 holds." In an August 2026 interview with Scripps News, Yang did not rule out another run for the White House in 2028 and said that "if there are pieces in place ... I'm still very, very much a patriot and want to do what I can for the country."

==== Libertarian Party ====
===== Formed exploratory committee =====
Candidate	Born	Experience	State	Exploratory committee announced	Website	Ref
Jo Jorgensen	May 1, 1957 (age 69); Libertyville, Illinois	2020 Libertarian presidential nominee	South Carolina	May 28, 2026	VoteJo28.com	

====== Jo Jorgensen ======
Jo Jorgensen is an academic and political activist who was the Libertarian Party's presidential nominee in the 2020 election. In May 2026, Jorgensen announced the formation of an exploratory committee to weigh a potential run for the 2028 Libertarian presidential nomination.

==== Green Party ====
===== Declared =====
Candidate	Born	Experience	State	Ref
Randy Toler	c. 1965 (age c. 60–61); Elgin, Illinois	Founder of the Green Party of the United States (disputed)	Florida	

====== Randy Toler ======
Toler has declared his candidacy for the presidency in the 2028 Green Party primaries, once again using the slogan "Put the green back in the Green Party" and emphasizing the need for a competitive Green Party in the wake of the reelection of Donald Trump and the 2025 Los Angeles wildfires.

==== Declined to be candidates ====
The following individuals have, as of November 2026, publicly denied interest in being a candidate:

- Tucker Carlson, American conservative media personality and podcaster
- Mark Cuban, billionaire businessman, co-owner of the Dallas Mavericks, and co-founder of 2929 Entertainment
- Jack Dorsey, former CEO of Twitter and founder of Bluesky (endorsed Thomas Massie)
- Marjorie Taylor Greene, former U.S. representative from GA-14 (2021–2026) (endorsed Carlson) (Note: Green was a registered Republican until 2026, when she resigned from the U.S. House, at which point she left the party out of protest of Donald Trump.)
- Robert F. Kennedy Jr., United States Secretary of Health and Human Services (2025–present) and 2024 presidential candidate
- Bill Maher, television host, comedian, actor and political commentator (endorsed Stephen A. Smith)
- Kyrsten Sinema, former U.S. senator from Arizona (2019–2025) (Note: Sinema was a registered Democrat until 2022, at which point she changed her registration to independent, and continued to caucus with the Senate Democrats.)

=== Endorsements ===
Tucker Carlson (declined)

Executive branch officials

- Joe Kent, former director of the National Counterterrorism Center (2025–2026), acting chief of staff to the director of national intelligence (2025), and runner-up for WA-3 in 2022 and 2024 (Republican)

U.S. representatives

- Marjorie Taylor Greene, former GA-14 (2021–2026)

Individuals

- Candace Owens, political commentator (Republican)
Robert F. Kennedy Jr. (declined)

Individuals

- Russell Brand, actor and comedian

== Opinion polling ==
=== General election ===
==== Nationwide ====
===== JD Vance vs. Kamala Harris =====
Poll source	Date(s) administered	Sample size (Note: Key: A – all adults RV – registered voters LV – likely voters V – unclear)	Vance (R)	Harris (D)	Undecided
Emerson College	August 16–17, 2026	1,000 (LV)	45%	49%	6%
Zogby	July 1–4, 2026	1,003 (LV)	43%	48%	9%
TPSI	May 21, 2026	893 (LV)	39%	47%	14%
Zogby	January 1–7, 2026	891 (LV)	42.1%	48.5%	9.4%
Morning Consult	November 14–16, 2025	2,201 (RV)	42%	43%	15%
Overton Insights	June 23–26, 2025	1,200 (RV)	42%	45%	12%
	January 20, 2025	Second inauguration of Donald Trump			
On Point/SoCal Strategies	December 23, 2024	656 (A)	41%	43%	16%
American Pulse Research & Polling	December 17–20, 2024	661 (LV)	46%	47%	7%

===== JD Vance vs. Gavin Newsom =====
Poll source	Date(s) administered	Sample size	Vance (R)	Newsom (D)	Undecided
The Bulwark/Pablo Torre Finds Out/YouGov	October 10–14, 2026	1,417 (A)	36%	41%	23%
UMass Lowell/YouGov	October 2–4, 2026	1,000 (LV)	42%	46%	12%
Emerson College	August 16–17, 2026	1,000 (LV)	44%	49%	7%
Zogby	July 1–4, 2026	1,003 (LV)	45%	38%	7%
Overton Insights	May 16–20, 2026	1,377 (V)	39%	44%	9%
UMass Lowell	March 26–30, 2026	1000 (RV) (Note: Another candidate 2%, Not vote 17%)	36%	33%	12%
Zogby	January 1–7, 2026	891 (LV)	44.6%	41%	14.3%
The Argument/Verasight	November 10–17, 2025	1,508 (RV)	46.4%	53.6%	–
Morning Consult	November 14–16, 2025	2,201 (RV)	42%	41%	17%
Overton Insights	October 27–29, 2025	1,200 (RV)	43%	46%	11%
YouGov	October 16–20, 2025	1,000 (A)	32%	36%	32%
Echelon Insights	October 16–20, 2025	1,010 (LV)	46%	47%	7%
Emerson College	October 13–14, 2025	1,000 (RV)	45.5%	44.9%	9.6%
Leger360	August 29–31, 2025	849 (A)	46%	47%	7%
YouGov/Yahoo	August 29 – September 2, 2025	1,690 (A)	41%	49%	10%
Emerson College	August 25–26, 2025	1,000 (RV)	44.4%	43.5%	12.1%
On Point/SoCal Strategies	August 18, 2025	700 (A)	37%	39%	23%
Emerson College	July 21–22, 2025	1,400 (RV)	45.3%	42.1%	12.6%
	January 20, 2025	Second inauguration of Donald Trump			
On Point/SoCal Strategies	December 23, 2024	656 (A)	37%	34%	29%

===== JD Vance vs. Gavin Newsom vs. Aaron Rodgers as an Independent =====
Poll source	Date(s) administered	Sample size	Vance (R)	Newsom (D)	Rodgers (I)	Undecided
The Bulwark/Pablo Torre Finds Out/YouGov	October 10–14, 2026	1,417 (A)	35%	37%	7%	21%

===== JD Vance vs. Gavin Newsom vs. Stephen A. Smith as an Independent =====
Poll source	Date(s) administered	Sample size	Vance (R)	Newsom (D)	Smith (I)	Undecided
The Bulwark/Pablo Torre Finds Out/YouGov	October 10–14, 2026	1,417 (A)	34%	37%	6%	23%

===== JD Vance vs. Alexandria Ocasio-Cortez =====
Poll source	Date(s) administered	Sample size	Vance (R)	Ocasio-Cortez (D)	Undecided
McLaughlin & Associates	October 30 – November 5, 2026	1,000 (LV)	49%	39%	13%
The Bulwark/Pablo Torre Finds Out/YouGov	October 10–14, 2026	1,417 (A)	38%	40%	22%
UMass Lowell/YouGov	October 2–4, 2026	1,000 (LV)	42%	45%	13%
Quantus Insights	August 26–28, 2026	1,200 (LV)	45%	42%	13%
Emerson College	August 16–17, 2026	1,000 (LV)	46%	44%	11%
Zogby	July 1–4, 2026	1,003 (LV)	45%	38%	7%
UMass Lowell	March 26–30, 2026	1000 (RV) (Note: Another candidate 2%, Not vote 16%)	36%	33%	13%
Focaldata	March 6–10, 2026	1,782 (A)	40%	43%	18%
The Argument/Verasight	December 5–11, 2025	1,521 (RV)	49%	51%	–
YouGov	October 16–20, 2025	1,000 (A)	34%	34%	32%
Emerson College	July 21–22, 2025	1,400 (RV)	44.4%	41.0%	14.6%

===== JD Vance vs. Alexandria Ocasio-Cortez vs. Aaron Rodgers as an Independent =====
Poll source	Date(s) administered	Sample size	Vance (R)	Ocasio-Cortez (D)	Rodgers (I)	Undecided
The Bulwark/Pablo Torre Finds Out/YouGov	October 10–14, 2026	1,417 (A)	35%	36%	6%	22%

===== JD Vance vs. Alexandria Ocasio-Cortez vs. Stephen A. Smith as an Independent =====
Poll source	Date(s) administered	Sample size	Vance (R)	Ocasio-Cortez (D)	Smith (I)	Undecided
The Bulwark/Pablo Torre Finds Out/YouGov	October 10–14, 2026	1,417 (A)	35%	35%	6%	24%

===== JD Vance vs. Josh Shapiro =====
Poll source	Date(s) administered	Sample size	Vance (R)	Shapiro (D)	Undecided
On Point/SoCal Strategies	December 23, 2024	656 (A)	37%	34%	29%

===== JD Vance vs. Stephen A. Smith =====
Poll source	Date(s) administered	Sample size	Vance (R)	Smith (D)	Undecided
On Point/SoCal Strategies	August 18, 2025	700 (A)	37%	35%	28%

===== JD Vance vs. Gretchen Whitmer =====
Poll source	Date(s) administered	Sample size	Vance (R)	Whitmer (D)	Undecided
On Point/SoCal Strategies	December 23, 2024	656 (A)	40%	33%	26%

===== JD Vance vs. Pete Buttigieg =====
Poll source	Date(s) administered	Sample size	Vance (R)	Buttigieg (D)	Undecided
The Bulwark/Pablo Torre Finds Out/YouGov	October 10–14, 2026	1,417 (A)	36%	38%	25%
Emerson College	August 16–17, 2026	1,000 (LV)	44%	49%	8%
On Point/SoCal Strategies	August 18, 2025	700 (A)	37%	41%	21%
Emerson College	July 21–22, 2025	1,400 (RV)	43.9%	43.1%	13.0%

===== JD Vance vs. Pete Buttigieg vs. Aaron Rodgers as an Independent =====
Poll source	Date(s) administered	Sample size	Vance (R)	Buttigieg (D)	Rodgers (I)	Undecided
The Bulwark/Pablo Torre Finds Out/YouGov	October 10–14, 2026	1,417 (A)	34%	36%	7%	23%

===== JD Vance vs. Pete Buttigieg vs. Stephen A. Smith as an Independent =====
Poll source	Date(s) administered	Sample size	Vance (R)	Buttigieg (D)	Smith (I)	Undecided
The Bulwark/Pablo Torre Finds Out/YouGov	October 10–14, 2026	1,417 (A)	35%	34%	7%	25%

===== JD Vance vs. Jon Ossoff =====
Poll source	Date(s) administered	Sample size	Vance (R)	Ossoff (D)	Undecided
Emerson College	August 16–17, 2026	1,000 (LV)	44%	49%	7%

===== JD Vance vs. Mark Cuban =====
Poll source	Date(s) administered	Sample size	Vance (R)	Cuban (D)	Undecided
The Bulwark/Pablo Torre Finds Out/YouGov	October 10–14, 2026	1,417 (A)	34%	39%	27%

===== JD Vance vs. Mark Cuban vs. Aaron Rodgers as an Independent =====
Poll source	Date(s) administered	Sample size	Vance (R)	Cuban (D)	Rodgers (I)	Undecided
The Bulwark/Pablo Torre Finds Out/YouGov	October 10–14, 2026	1,417 (A)	34%	34%	6%	26%

===== JD Vance vs. Mark Cuban vs. Stephen A. Smith as an Independent =====
Poll source	Date(s) administered	Sample size	Vance (R)	Cuban (D)	Smith (I)	Undecided
The Bulwark/Pablo Torre Finds Out/YouGov	October 10–14, 2026	1,417 (A)	34%	34%	6%	26%

===== Marco Rubio vs. Kamala Harris =====
Poll source	Date(s) administered	Sample size	Rubio (R)	Harris (D)	Undecided
Emerson College	August 16–17, 2026	1,000 (LV)	48%	43%	9%
Zogby	July 1–4, 2026	1,003 (LV)	41%	46%	13%
Morning Consult	November 14–16, 2025	2,201 (RV)	40%	42%	18%

===== Marco Rubio vs. Gavin Newsom =====
Poll source	Date(s) administered	Sample size	Rubio (R)	Newsom (D)	Undecided
UMass Lowell/YouGov	October 2–4, 2026	1,000 (LV)	42%	44%	13%
Emerson College	August 16–17, 2026	1,000 (LV)	46%	48%	6%
Zogby	July 1–4, 2026	1,003 (LV)	40%	36%	24%
Morning Consult	November 14–16, 2025	2,201 (RV)	39%	41%	20%
Leger360	August 29–31, 2025	849 (A)	44%	49%	7%

===== Marco Rubio vs. Alexandria Ocasio-Cortez =====
Poll source	Date(s) administered	Sample size	Rubio (R)	Ocasio-Cortez (D)	Undecided
McLaughlin & Associates	October 30 – November 5, 2026	1,000 (LV)	48%	38%	14%
UMass/YouGov	October 2–4, 2026	1,000 (LV)	43%	43%	14%
Emerson College	August 16–17, 2026	1,000 (LV)	48%	43%	8%
Zogby	July 1–4, 2026	1,003 (LV)	39%	38%	23%

===== Marco Rubio vs. Jon Ossoff =====
Poll source	Date(s) administered	Sample size	Rubio (R)	Ossoff (D)	Undecided
Emerson College	August 16–17, 2026	1,000 (LV)	44%	47%	9%

===== Donald Trump Jr. vs. Hunter Biden =====
Poll source	Date(s) administered	Sample size	Trump Jr. (R)	Biden (D)	Undecided
UMass Lowell/YouGov	October 2–4, 2026	1,000 (LV)	36%	37%	27%

==== Statewide ====
===== Nevada =====
====== JD Vance vs. Gavin Newsom ======
Poll source	Date(s) administered	Sample size	Vance (R)	Newsom (D)	Undecided
The Tarrance Group	June 20–24, 2026	550 (LV)	47%	43%	10%
