= Peter Pastreich =

Peter Pastreich (born September 14, 1938) was executive director of the Philharmonia Baroque Orchestra (2009–2011), the San Francisco Symphony (1978 to 1999), the Saint Louis Symphony Orchestra (1966–1978) and the Nashville Symphony (1962–1964). On August 11, 2016, he was named interim executive director of American Conservatory Theater (A.C.T.) in San Francisco; a month later, on his 78th birthday, he became executive director, a position he held for two years, during which he assisted A.C.T. to engage new leadership for its artistic director, executive director, board chair, and board president positions.

He has five children: Emanuel Pastreich, Michael Pastreich, Anna Schlagel, Milena Pastreich and stepson Adam Gasner. Michael has followed his father's footsteps and was CEO of both the Elgin Symphony Orchestra and The Florida Orchestra for a total of 23 years.
