= Emanuel Pastreich =

American literary scholar (born 1964)

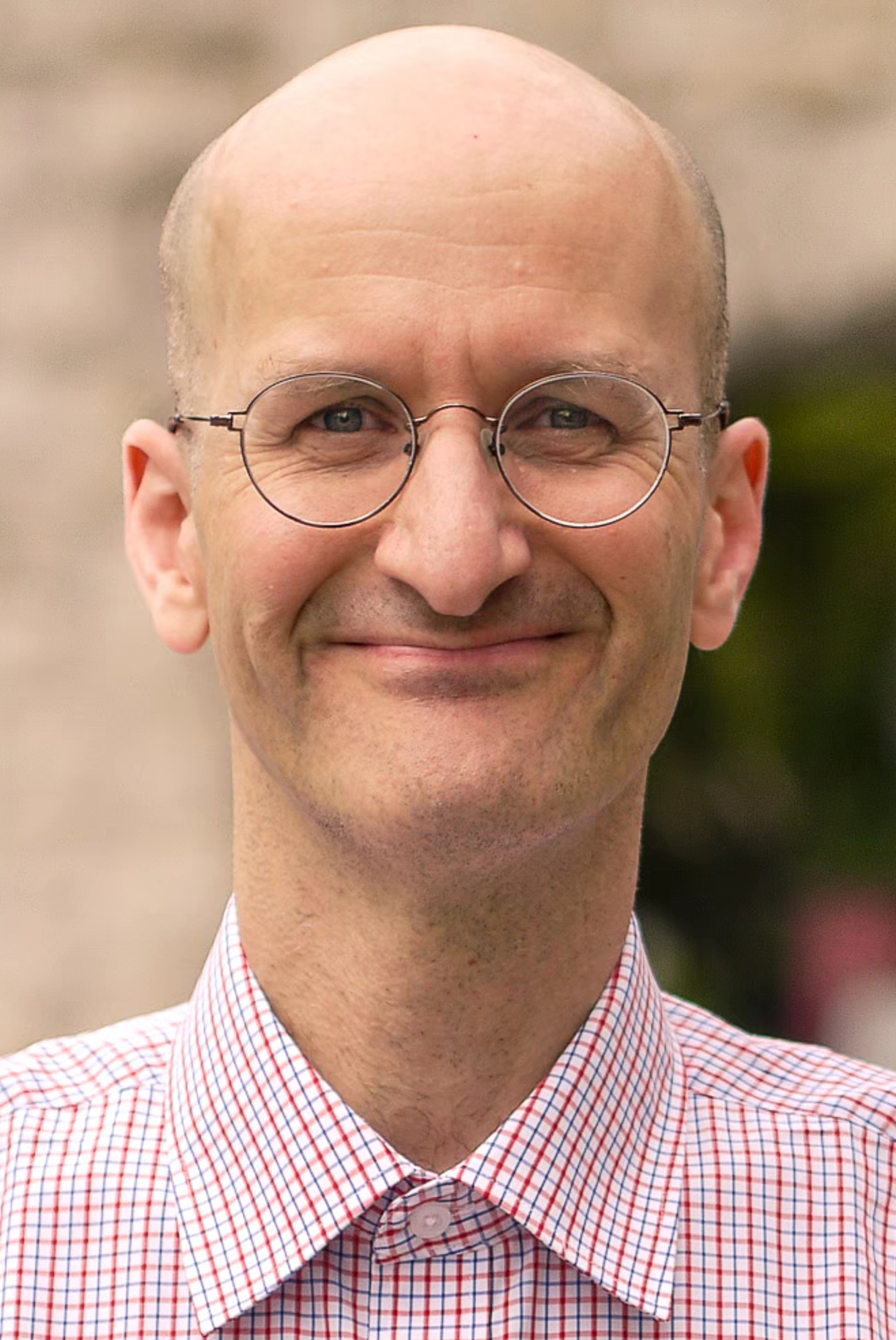
- Pastreich in 2015
- Born: Emanuel Pastreich; October 16, 1964 (age 62); Nashville, Tennessee
- Education: Yale University (B.A.); University of Tokyo (M.A.); Harvard University (Ph.D.)
- Occupations: Professor, director
- Political party: Green (2023–present); Independent (before 2023)
- Children: 2
- Parent: Peter Pastreich
- Relatives: Michael Pastreich (brother)
- Website: circlesandsquares.asia

Emanuel Pastreich
- Traditional Chinese: 貝一明
- Simplified Chinese: 贝一明
Transcriptions
Standard Mandarin
- Hanyu Pinyin: Bèi Yīmíng
- Wade–Giles: Pei I-ming

Emanuel Pastreich (born October 16, 1964) is an American professor, director, and polyglot. He is an international relations expert and serves as the president of The Asia Institute, a think tank with offices in Washington DC, Tokyo, Seoul, and Hanoi.

Pastreich served briefly as an independent candidate for president of the United States in 2020. In September 2023, Pastreich officially became a candidate for the Green Party's presidential nomination for the 2024 election. However, he had to abandon the campaign for the Green nomination because of a failure to gain financial support within the party. He re-launched his candidacy as an Independent, and gained the endorsement of the New Era Party. He was not on the ballot in any states, but earned write-in votes.

He currently serves as director of the Center for Truth Politics at Green Liberty. Trained as a scholar of Asian studies, Pastreich writes on both East Asian classical literature and current issues in international relations and technology in multiple languages.

Pastreich speaks fluent Chinese, Japanese, and Korean and stresses the importance of Asia for the United States in his political writings.

== Early life and education ==
Pastreich was born in Nashville, Tennessee, on October 16, 1964, to symphony manager Peter Pastreich and painter Marie Louise Rouff. He attended Lowell High School in San Francisco, graduating in 1983.

He began his studies at Yale University, graduating with a B.A. in Chinese in 1987. He studied abroad at National Taiwan University in 1985. Pastreich obtained an M.A. in comparative literature at the University of Tokyo in 1991, where he wrote the master's dissertation entirely in Japanese. He then received a Ph.D. in East Asian studies from Harvard University in 1998.

== Work ==
Pastreich is president of The Asia Institute, a think tank that conducts research on the intersection of international relations, the environment, and technology in East Asia.

He served as a professor at the University of Illinois at Urbana–Champaign, where he taught Japanese culture and was a researcher at the Program in Arms Control & Domestic & International Security, George Washington University, Solbridge International School of Business, and the College of International Studies, Kyung Hee University. He also worked as an advisor for international relations to the governor of Chungnam Province (2007–2008) and conducted numerous research projects with Korean science institutes.

Pastreich's close relations with South Korea began after he was dismissed in 2004 from his position as assistant professor at the University of Illinois, Urbana-Champaign, and was offered a position at the S. Korean embassy in Washington DC. He served as the director of the KORUS House (2005–2007), a think tank for international relations at the embassy, and as the editor-in-chief of Dynamic Korea, a journal of the Korean Foreign Ministry that introduces Korean culture and society.

His best-known book is I Shall Fear No Evil (2020) which consists of a series of major speeches from his 2020 presidential campaign. The speeches touch on economic, security, and social problems within the context of America's historical evolution, drawing on wisdom gathered from Western and Eastern political philosophy to address current social contradictions. His other writings in English include the books The Novels of Park Jiwon: Translations of Overlooked Worlds, a collection of novels by a Korean pre-modern author, The Visible Vernacular: Vernacular Chinese and the Emergence of a Literary Discourse on Popular Narrative in Edo Japan, a study of the reception of Chinese vernacular literature in Japan, Earth Management: A Dialogue on Ancient Korean Wisdom and its Lessons for a New Earth, and his autobiographical novel Wrestling with Shadows.

His eight books in Korean include Life is a Matter of Direction, not Speed: A Robinson Crusoe in Korea, a description of his experiences living in Korea; Scholars of the World Speak out About Korea's Future, a series of interviews with leading scholars such as Francis Fukuyama, Larry Wilkerson and Noam Chomsky about contemporary Korea; A Republic of Korea that Koreans do not understand, an assessment of Korea's native traditions and their value that was praised by former President Park Geun-hye and designated as a national security book by the Korean Government; No Fake Unification, a blistering critique of plans to push through a unification of the Korean Peninsula led by multinational corporations; and Earth Management: Finding the Answer in the Hongik Tradition, a consideration of the importance of traditional culture in an age of ecological crisis.

His books in Japanese include A Farewell to Arms, a call for a radical revision of security policy in light of the destruction of the environment, and Japan jinxed by COVID-19, a brutal assessment of the new political environment for Japan after the onset of COVID-19.

== Personal life ==
Pastreich has three siblings, including Michael Pastreich, Anna Schlagel, and Milena Pastreich. He has two children. His wife of twenty-five years, Seung-Eun Yi Pastreich, died in 2022.

== Published works ==
=== Books ===
==== English books ====
- The Novels of Park Jiwon: Translations of Overlooked Worlds (2011). Seoul: Seoul National University Press. ISBN 89-521-1176-1
- The Visible Mundane: Vernacular Chinese and the Emergence of a Literary Discourse on Popular Narrative in Edo Japan (2011). Seoul: Seoul National University Press. ISBN 89-521-1177-X
- Selected Publications of The Asia Institute (2013). Seoul: The Asia Institute Press. ISBN 978-89-969848-0-1
- Earth Management: A Dialogue on Ancient Korean Wisdom and Its Lessons for a New Earth (2016); co-authored with Lee Ilchi. Seoul: Best Life Media.
- I Shall Fear No Evil: Why we need a truly independent Candidate for President. (2021). New York, BookBaby, 2020. ISBN 978-1-64999-450-9
- Wrestling with Shadows (2022). New York, BookBaby. ASIN B09V8BF59D
- How to take down the Billionaires (2022). Seoul: The Asia Institute.
- The Bitter Tonic Known as Truth: Selected Speeches / Campaign for President (2024). New York, BookBaby (2024). ASIN B0CYHG78SG

==== Korean books ====
- Insaeng eun sokdo ga anira banghyang ida: Habeodeu baksa eui hanguk pyoryugi (Life is a Matter of Direction, Not of Speed: Records of a Robinson Crusoe in Korea) (2011). Seoul: Nomad Books. ISBN 978-89-91794-56-6
- Segye seokhak deul hanguk eui mirae reul mal hada (Scholars of the World Speak Out About Korea's Future) (2012). Seoul: Dasan Books. ISBN 978-89-6370-072-4
- Han'gukin man moreu neun dareun daehan min'guk (A Different Republic of Korea—About which only Koreans are Ignorant) (2013). Seoul: 21 Segi Books. ISBN 978-89-509-5108-5
- Jigugyeongyoung Hongik e seo dap eul chatda (Earth Management: Finding the Answer in the Hongik tradition (co-authored with Lee Ilchi) (2016). Seoul: Hanmun Hwa. ISBN 978-89-5699-286-0
- Han'gukin man morratteon deo keun daehanminguk (A Greater Korea that Korean's did not know about) (2017). Seoul: Redwood Books. ISBN 979-11-87705-05-5
- "Korona sagi reur hyeongmyeong euro ggeutneja" (End COVID19 through revolution) (2022). Seoul: Narudo Books. ISBN 978-89-92973-28-1
- "Sagi tongil geuman! Jaebeol ui bukhan gaebal malgo, huimang eul chuneun geonguk euro"

(No Fake Unification for Korea! A national founding that gives hope, not development of North Korea by conglomerates) (2023). Seoul: Narudo Books. ISBN 978-89-92973-29-8

==== Japanese books ====
- "Buki yo saraba: chikyu ondanka no kiki to Kenpo kyujo" (A Farewell to Arms: The Crisis of Climate Change and Article Nine of the Japanese Constitution) (2019). Osaka: Toho Publishers.
- "Watashi wa aku wo osorenai: 2020nen beikoku daitoryosen he no shutsuba sengen"
- "Korona tatari ni madou nihon" (Japan Jinxed by COVID19) (2023) Tokyo: Design Egg.

==== Chinese books ====
- Kuahai qiuzhen: Hafo boshi lun zhongmei weilai (Searching for the Truth on Both Sides of the Ocean) (2016). Hong Kong: Milky Way Publishers. ISBN 978-99965-49-42-7. (in Chinese)
- "Weilai zhongguo: guanyu renlei yu diqiu mingyun (Future China: The Destiny of Humanity and the Earth) (2019). Hong Kong: Xiandai wenhua. ISBN 978-988-79567-4-7
- Wo Juebu weiju xiee: Meiguode zongtong daxuan weihe yiding yaoyou zhenzhengde duli canxuanren canyu (I Shall Fear No Evil: Why America's Presidential Election must include a truly independent candidate) (2020). Beijing: The Asia Institute.
- Ruhe tuifan fuhao jieceng: shiyi zhang xingdong gangyao (How to overthrow the Billionaires: Eleven Chapters outlining action) (2022). Beijing: The Asia Institute.

=== Articles ===
A list of articles published online by Pastreich can be found on this web page.

== See also ==
- List of people from Nashville
- List of Sinologists
