= Michael Pastreich =

American performing arts executive (born 1966)

- Born: July 14, 1966 (age 60); St. Louis, Missouri, United States
- Education: Washington University in St. Louis (BA)
- Occupations: Performing Arts Executive (former), Founder & Owner, Colby's Dogcare & Spa
- Parents: Peter Pastreich; Marie Louis Rouff
- Website: https://www.colbysdogcare.com

Michael Pastreich (born July 14, 1966) is an American performing arts executive. He became the executive director of the Washington Ballet in May 2019. He was the longest serving president & CEO of The Florida Orchestra, and served for 11 years from the 40th anniversary of the orchestra in 2007 until 2018. During his tenure, paid attendance to performances increased by 49%, while national attendance to orchestra performances went down. In 2014, the magazine Musical American presented him in their series Profiles in Courage. Major projects to engage the community are cited by the orchestra as being drivers in the orchestra's popularity.

Previously he was the Executive Director of the Elgin Symphony Orchestra in Illinois from 1996 until 2007. In 2005, the Chicago Tribune named him a "Chicagoan of the Year" and credited him with helping to transform "a struggling community ensemble into one of the Midwest's most artistically and financially secure regional orchestras." In 2006, the Illinois Council of Orchestras named him Executive Director of the Year.

He is the son of performing arts executive Peter Pastreich.
