= 2024 United States presidential election in Kentucky =

- November 5, 2024
- Turnout: 58.8% ▼

Nominee	Donald Trump	Kamala Harris
Party	Republican	Democratic
Home state	Florida	California
Running mate	JD Vance	Tim Walz
Electoral vote	8	0
Popular vote	1,337,494	704,043
Percentage	64.47%	33.94%

Trump
40–50%
50–60%
60–70%
70–80%
80–90%
90–100%
Harris
40–50%
50–60%
60–70%
70–80%
80–90%
90–100%
Tie/No data
President before election
Joe Biden
Democratic
Elected President
Donald Trump
Republican

The 2024 United States presidential election in Kentucky took place on Tuesday, November 5, 2024, as part of the 2024 United States elections in which all 50 states plus the District of Columbia participated. Kentucky voters chose electors to represent them in the Electoral College via a popular vote. The state of Kentucky has 8 electoral votes in the Electoral College, following reapportionment due to the 2020 United States census in which the state neither gained nor lost a seat.

Prior to the election, all major news organizations once again considered Kentucky a safe red state; the state has voted Republican and by double-digit margins in every presidential election since 2000.

On election night, Kentucky voted Republican for former president Donald Trump by a wide margin for the third time in a row, with him winning the state by 30.53%, making it the biggest margin of victory for a Republican in the state's history, surpassing the record he set in 2016. He received about 1.34 million Kentucky votes, a record for votes cast for any candidate in state history.

This is the best share of the vote by a Republican presidential candidate in the state's history, surpassing Richard Nixon's 1972 performance. Trump's vote share of 64.4% is also the third-highest in state history, behind only 1864 and 1868.

== Primary elections ==
=== Democratic primary ===
The Kentucky Democratic presidential primary was held on May 21, 2024, alongside the Oregon primary.

Kentucky Democratic primary, May 21, 2024
Candidate	Votes	%	Delegates
Joe Biden (incumbent)	131,449	71.33	45
Uncommitted	32,908	17.86	8
Marianne Williamson	11,190	6.07	0
Dean Phillips (withdrawn)	8,744	4.74	0
Total	184,291	100%	53

=== Republican primary ===
The Kentucky Republican primary was held on May 21, 2024, alongside the Oregon primary.

Kentucky Republican primary, May 21, 2024
Candidate	Votes	Percentage	Actual delegate count		
Candidate	Votes	Percentage	Bound	Unbound	Total
Donald Trump	215,044	85.0%	46		46
Nikki Haley (withdrawn)	16,232	6.4%			
Uncommitted	8,984	3.5%			
Ron DeSantis (withdrawn)	7,803	3.1%			
Chris Christie (withdrawn)	2,461	1.0%			
Vivek Ramaswamy (withdrawn)	1,640	0.7%			
Ryan Binkley (withdrawn)	900	0.4%			
Total:	253,064	100.0%	46		46

== General election ==
=== Candidates ===
The following candidates qualified for the general election ballot:

- Donald Trump — Republican
- Kamala Harris — Democratic
- Jill Stein — Kentucky Party (national Green nominee)
- Shiva Ayyadurai — Independent
- Robert F. Kennedy Jr. — Independent (Note: Candidate has suspended campaign)
- Chase Oliver — Libertarian

Additionally, Kentucky voters had the option to write-in a name for president as long as said candidate filed for office before October 25. Eleven such candidates filed, although only nine received at least one vote.

=== Predictions ===
Source	Ranking	As of
Cook Political Report	Solid R	December 19, 2023
Inside Elections	Solid R	April 26, 2023
Sabato's Crystal Ball	Safe R	June 29, 2023
Decision Desk HQ/The Hill	Safe R	December 14, 2023
CNalysis	Solid R	December 30, 2023
CNN	Solid R	January 14, 2024
The Economist	Safe R	June 12, 2024
538	Solid R	June 11, 2024
RCP	Solid R	June 26, 2024
NBC News	Safe R	October 6, 2024

=== Polling ===
Hypothetical polling with Donald Trump and Joe Biden

Donald Trump vs. Joe Biden

Poll source	Date(s) administered	Sample size (Note: Key: A – all adults RV – registered voters LV – likely voters V – unclear)	Margin of error	Donald Trump Republican	Joe Biden Democratic	Other / Undecided
John Zogby Strategies (Note: Poll conducted for Kennedy's campaign)	April 13–21, 2024	402 (LV)	–	60%	35%	5%
Emerson College	October 1–3, 2023	450 (RV)	± 4.6%	55%	26%	19%
Public Policy Polling (D)	August 9–10, 2023	737 (V)	–	55%	34%	11%
co/efficient (R)	May 18–19, 2023	987 (LV)	± 3.1%	57%	33%	10%

Hypothetical polling with other candidates

Donald Trump vs. Robert F. Kennedy Jr.

Poll source	Date(s) administered	Sample size	Margin of error	Donald Trump Republican	Robert Kennedy Jr. Independent	Other / Undecided
John Zogby Strategies	April 13–21, 2024	402 (LV)	–	52%	35%	13%

Robert F. Kennedy Jr. vs. Joe Biden

Poll source	Date(s) administered	Sample size	Margin of error	Robert Kennedy Jr. Independent	Joe Biden Democratic	Other / Undecided
John Zogby Strategies	April 13–21, 2024	402 (LV)	–	61%	29%	10%

=== Results ===
State House district results: Trump 40–50% 50–60% 60–70% 70–80% 80–90% / Harris 50–60% 60–70% 70–80% 80–90%

2024 United States presidential election in Kentucky
Party	Candidate	Votes	%	±%
Republican	Donald Trump; JD Vance	1,337,494	64.47%	+2.38%
Democratic	Kamala Harris; Tim Walz	704,043	33.94%	–2.21%
Independent	Robert F. Kennedy Jr. (withdrawn); Nicole Shanahan (withdrawn)	16,769	0.81%	N/A
Kentucky	Jill Stein; Samson Kpadenou (Note: Replacement for Butch Ware, Stein's vice presidential nominee.)	7,566	0.36%	+0.33%
Libertarian	Chase Oliver; Mike ter Maat	6,422	0.31%	–0.92%
Independent	Shiva Ayyadurai; Crystal Ellis	1,015	0.05%	N/A
American Solidarity	Peter Sonski (write-in); Lauren Onak (write-in)	611	0.03%	+0.01%
Socialism and Liberation	Claudia De la Cruz (write-in); Karina Garcia (write-in)	391	0.02%	+0.02%
Independent	Cornel West (write-in); Melina Abdullah (write-in)	177	0.01%	N/A
Independent	James Soderna (write-in); Matthew Trewhella (write-in)	14	0.00%	N/A
Independent	Jay Bowman (write-in); De Bowman (write-in)	10	0.00%	N/A
Socialist Equality	Joseph Kishore (write-in); Jerry White (write-in)	8	0.00%	N/A
Independent	John Cheng (write-in); Wayne Waligorski (write-in)	5	0.00%	N/A
Independent	Billy Kelly (write-in); Jason Holderman (write-in)	4	0.00%	N/A
Independent	Cherunda Fox (write-in); Harlan McVay (write-in)	1	0.00%	N/A
Total votes		2,074,530	100.00%	N/A

==== By county ====
County	Donald Trump Republican		Kamala Harris Democratic		Various candidates Other parties		Margin		Total
County	#	%	#	%	#	%	#	%	Total
Adair	7,643	85.17%	1,257	14.01%	74	0.82%	6,386	71.16%	8,974
Allen	7,824	83.07%	1,505	15.98%	89	0.95%	6,319	67.09%	9,418
Anderson	9,650	73.69%	3,226	24.64%	219	1.67%	6,424	49.05%	13,095
Ballard	3,331	81.48%	697	17.05%	60	1.47%	2,634	64.43%	4,088
Barren	15,019	75.85%	4,565	23.05%	218	1.10%	10,454	52.80%	19,802
Bath	4,041	74.99%	1,278	23.71%	70	1.30%	2,763	51.28%	5,389
Bell	7,831	83.84%	1,419	15.19%	90	0.97%	6,412	68.65%	9,340
Boone	45,650	67.71%	20,601	30.56%	1,170	1.73%	25,049	37.15%	67,421
Bourbon	6,284	65.89%	3,088	32.38%	165	1.73%	3,196	33.51%	9,537
Boyd	14,363	68.56%	6,291	30.03%	297	1.41%	8,072	38.53%	20,951
Boyle	9,159	63.72%	4,990	34.72%	224	1.56%	4,169	29.00%	14,373
Bracken	3,399	81.84%	702	16.90%	52	1.26%	2,697	64.94%	4,153
Breathitt	4,036	78.86%	1,002	19.58%	80	1.56%	3,034	59.28%	5,118
Breckinridge	7,882	78.44%	2,038	20.28%	128	1.28%	5,844	58.16%	10,048
Bullitt	32,299	74.75%	10,280	23.79%	630	1.46%	22,019	50.96%	43,209
Butler	4,905	82.53%	965	16.24%	73	1.23%	3,940	66.29%	5,943
Caldwell	4,860	78.54%	1,256	20.30%	72	1.16%	3,604	58.24%	6,188
Calloway	11,539	68.10%	5,111	30.16%	295	1.74%	6,428	37.94%	16,945
Campbell	28,450	58.86%	18,952	39.21%	932	1.93%	9,498	19.65%	48,334
Carlisle	2,182	83.60%	408	15.63%	20	0.77%	1,774	67.97%	2,610
Carroll	3,014	74.88%	963	23.93%	48	1.19%	2,051	50.95%	4,025
Carter	8,981	78.63%	2,305	20.18%	136	1.19%	6,676	58.45%	11,422
Casey	6,216	87.80%	804	11.36%	60	0.84%	5,412	76.44%	7,080
Christian	14,332	66.13%	7,055	32.56%	284	1.31%	7,277	33.57%	21,671
Clark	11,950	66.82%	5,639	31.53%	296	1.65%	6,311	35.29%	17,885
Clay	6,729	89.41%	692	9.19%	105	1.40%	6,037	80.22%	7,526
Clinton	4,276	87.43%	549	11.22%	66	1.35%	3,727	76.21%	4,891
Crittenden	3,349	83.52%	608	15.16%	53	1.32%	2,741	68.36%	4,010
Cumberland	2,922	84.89%	483	14.03%	37	1.08%	2,439	70.86%	3,442
Daviess	30,705	65.20%	15,673	33.28%	719	1.52%	15,032	31.92%	47,097
Edmonson	5,048	80.81%	1,118	17.90%	81	1.29%	3,930	62.91%	6,247
Elliott	2,335	80.13%	532	18.26%	47	1.61%	1,803	61.87%	2,914
Estill	5,091	80.94%	1,114	17.71%	85	1.35%	3,977	63.23%	6,290
Fayette	57,347	39.84%	83,387	57.93%	3,201	2.22%	-26,040	-18.09%	143,935
Fleming	5,578	79.69%	1,334	19.06%	88	1.25%	4,244	60.63%	7,000
Floyd	12,326	78.64%	3,061	19.53%	286	1.83%	9,265	59.11%	15,673
Franklin	13,246	51.41%	11,996	46.56%	521	2.03%	1,250	4.85%	25,763
Fulton	1,491	69.51%	636	29.65%	18	0.84%	855	39.86%	2,145
Gallatin	3,109	79.37%	761	19.43%	47	1.20%	2,348	59.94%	3,917
Garrard	7,086	79.47%	1,719	19.28%	112	1.25%	5,367	60.19%	8,917
Grant	9,372	81.72%	1,944	16.95%	153	1.33%	7,428	64.77%	11,469
Graves	13,378	80.21%	3,105	18.62%	195	1.17%	10,273	61.59%	16,678
Grayson	9,710	80.28%	2,235	18.48%	150	1.24%	7,475	61.80%	12,095
Green	5,033	85.93%	782	13.35%	42	0.72%	4,251	72.58%	5,857
Greenup	12,961	74.60%	4,181	24.06%	232	1.34%	8,780	50.54%	17,374
Hancock	3,375	72.85%	1,173	25.32%	85	1.83%	2,202	47.53%	4,633
Hardin	30,672	63.79%	16,572	34.47%	838	1.74%	14,100	29.32%	48,082
Harlan	9,109	87.69%	1,199	11.54%	80	0.77%	7,910	76.15%	10,388
Harrison	6,639	73.62%	2,265	25.12%	114	1.26%	4,374	48.50%	9,018
Hart	6,691	79.57%	1,642	19.53%	76	0.90%	5,049	60.04%	8,409
Henderson	12,592	63.96%	6,837	34.73%	259	1.31%	5,755	29.23%	19,688
Henry	6,093	75.46%	1,857	23.00%	124	1.54%	4,236	52.46%	8,074
Hickman	1,656	80.04%	394	19.04%	19	0.92%	1,262	61.00%	2,069
Hopkins	15,361	74.80%	4,916	23.94%	260	1.27%	10,445	50.86%	20,537
Jackson	5,358	90.14%	506	8.51%	80	1.35%	4,852	81.63%	5,944
Jefferson	144,553	40.64%	203,070	57.09%	8,099	2.27%	-58,517	-16.45%	355,722
Jessamine	17,854	66.91%	8,303	31.11%	528	1.98%	9,551	35.80%	26,685
Johnson	8,150	84.57%	1,350	14.01%	137	1.42%	6,800	70.56%	9,637
Kenton	48,444	59.63%	30,859	37.98%	1,938	2.39%	17,585	21.65%	81,241
Knott	4,732	78.67%	1,181	19.63%	102	1.70%	3,551	59.04%	6,015
Knox	11,178	84.82%	1,821	13.82%	180	1.36%	9,357	71.00%	13,179
LaRue	5,773	79.53%	1,389	19.13%	97	1.34%	4,384	60.40%	7,259
Laurel	23,516	84.17%	4,037	14.45%	385	1.38%	19,479	69.72%	27,938
Lawrence	5,464	83.12%	1,044	15.88%	66	1.00%	4,420	67.24%	6,574
Lee	2,227	82.63%	406	15.06%	62	2.31%	1,821	67.57%	2,695
Leslie	3,908	89.67%	382	8.77%	68	1.56%	3,526	80.90%	4,358
Letcher	6,848	81.22%	1,457	17.28%	126	1.49%	5,391	63.94%	8,431
Lewis	4,997	87.34%	666	11.64%	58	1.02%	4,331	75.70%	5,721
Lincoln	8,833	80.05%	2,080	18.85%	121	1.10%	6,753	61.20%	11,034
Livingston	4,021	80.87%	886	17.82%	65	1.31%	3,135	63.05%	4,972
Logan	9,620	76.89%	2,734	21.85%	157	1.26%	6,886	55.04%	12,511
Lyon	3,187	76.12%	950	22.69%	50	1.19%	2,237	53.43%	4,187
McCracken	21,349	66.83%	10,191	31.90%	407	1.27%	11,158	34.93%	31,947
McCreary	5,531	89.04%	641	10.32%	40	0.64%	4,890	78.72%	6,212
McLean	3,578	77.21%	989	21.34%	67	1.45%	2,589	55.87%	4,634
Madison	29,130	64.26%	15,180	33.49%	1,019	2.25%	13,950	30.77%	45,329
Magoffin	4,288	81.18%	909	17.21%	85	1.61%	3,379	63.97%	5,282
Marion	6,473	71.12%	2,513	27.61%	116	1.27%	3,960	43.51%	9,102
Marshall	13,677	77.70%	3,700	21.02%	225	1.28%	9,977	56.68%	17,602
Martin	3,343	91.39%	287	7.85%	28	0.76%	3,056	83.54%	3,658
Mason	5,621	71.14%	2,170	27.46%	110	1.40%	3,451	43.68%	7,901
Meade	10,630	75.27%	3,279	23.22%	214	1.51%	7,351	52.05%	14,123
Menifee	2,563	77.67%	664	20.12%	73	2.21%	1,899	57.55%	3,300
Mercer	8,826	74.47%	2,838	23.95%	187	1.58%	5,988	50.52%	11,851
Metcalfe	4,197	81.86%	884	17.24%	46	0.90%	3,313	64.62%	5,127
Monroe	4,679	88.15%	576	10.85%	53	1.00%	4,103	77.30%	5,308
Montgomery	9,302	72.55%	3,329	25.97%	190	1.48%	5,973	46.58%	12,821
Morgan	4,353	80.94%	939	17.46%	86	1.60%	3,414	63.48%	5,378
Muhlenberg	10,491	76.62%	3,048	22.26%	153	1.12%	7,443	54.36%	13,692
Nelson	16,052	70.24%	6,515	28.51%	285	1.25%	9,537	41.73%	22,852
Nicholas	2,451	73.85%	824	24.83%	44	1.32%	1,627	49.02%	3,319
Ohio	8,679	79.35%	2,094	19.15%	164	1.50%	6,585	60.20%	10,937
Oldham	23,025	60.26%	14,402	37.69%	783	2.05%	8,623	22.57%	38,210
Owen	4,434	80.62%	988	17.96%	78	1.42%	3,446	62.66%	5,500
Owsley	1,625	88.36%	203	11.04%	11	0.60%	1,422	77.32%	1,839
Pendleton	5,593	81.06%	1,210	17.54%	97	1.40%	4,383	63.52%	6,900
Perry	7,913	79.19%	1,966	19.68%	113	1.13%	5,947	59.51%	9,992
Pike	19,684	82.19%	4,025	16.81%	241	1.00%	15,659	65.38%	23,950
Powell	4,092	76.22%	1,174	21.87%	103	1.91%	2,918	54.35%	5,369
Pulaski	26,051	82.09%	5,351	16.86%	333	1.05%	20,700	65.23%	31,735
Robertson	915	79.98%	215	18.79%	14	1.23%	700	61.19%	1,144
Rockcastle	6,635	85.76%	986	12.74%	116	1.50%	5,649	73.02%	7,737
Rowan	6,224	63.04%	3,484	35.29%	165	1.67%	2,740	27.75%	9,873
Russell	7,622	85.71%	1,200	13.49%	71	0.80%	6,422	72.22%	8,893
Scott	18,747	62.97%	10,501	35.27%	521	1.76%	8,246	27.70%	29,769
Shelby	16,356	66.43%	7,822	31.77%	442	1.80%	8,534	34.66%	24,620
Simpson	6,253	71.25%	2,403	27.38%	120	1.37%	3,850	43.87%	8,776
Spencer	8,927	77.76%	2,415	21.04%	138	1.20%	6,512	56.72%	11,480
Taylor	9,523	77.67%	2,576	21.01%	162	1.32%	6,947	56.66%	12,261
Todd	4,009	78.42%	1,051	20.56%	52	1.02%	2,958	57.86%	5,112
Trigg	5,436	75.54%	1,667	23.17%	93	1.29%	3,769	52.37%	7,196
Trimble	3,283	77.27%	923	21.72%	43	1.01%	2,360	55.55%	4,249
Union	4,758	78.54%	1,225	20.22%	75	1.24%	3,533	58.32%	6,058
Warren	34,862	61.28%	21,065	37.03%	964	1.69%	13,797	24.25%	56,891
Washington	4,720	74.44%	1,533	24.18%	88	1.38%	3,187	50.26%	6,341
Wayne	7,203	82.48%	1,444	16.53%	86	0.99%	5,759	65.95%	8,733
Webster	4,339	78.10%	1,153	20.75%	64	1.15%	3,186	57.35%	5,556
Whitley	12,687	84.16%	2,237	14.84%	151	1.00%	10,450	69.32%	15,075
Wolfe	2,163	74.10%	689	23.60%	67	2.30%	1,474	50.50%	2,919
Woodford	8,419	56.15%	6,282	41.90%	292	1.95%	2,137	14.25%	14,993
Totals	1,337,494	64.47%	704,043	33.94%	32,993	1.59%	633,451	30.53%	2,074,530

==== By congressional district ====
Trump won five of six congressional districts.

District	Trump	Harris	Representative
1st	72.99%	25.71%	James Comer
2nd	69.92%	28.61%	Brett Guthrie
3rd	39.62%	58.53%	Morgan McGarvey
4th	66.91%	31.37%	Thomas Massie
5th	81.33%	17.45%	Hal Rogers
6th	56.54%	41.52%	Andy Barr

== Analysis ==
A Southern state completely in the Bible Belt, Republicans have won Kentucky by double digits since 2000, marking a record for the party. The state last voted Democratic for fellow Southerner Bill Clinton in 1996.

Kentucky handed Republican Donald Trump a decisive victory, doing so by a margin of 633,451 votes. This election marks the fourth consecutive cycle in which a presidential candidate secured over 60% of the Kentuckian vote. Notably, Trump improved his margins in every county and gained significant support across all demographics, performing better in suburban, rural, and urban areas.

Trump notably expanded his support in Kentucky's Cumberland Plateau region, the Frankfort micropolitan area, and Warren County, home to Bowling Green.

In Elliott County, Trump received 80% of the vote, the highest vote share in its history. In 2004, Elliott County had given Democratic nominee John Kerry 70% of the vote, despite Kerry and Harris winning 48.3% of the national popular vote. Trump is the first Republican to have ever won Elliott County in presidential elections.

In Warren County, Trump received 61.3% of the vote, marking the strongest Republican performance in a presidential election since George W. Bush in 2004. Additionally, Trump regained some ground in the Democratic strongholds of Jefferson and Fayette counties.

== See also ==
- United States presidential elections in Kentucky
- 2024 United States presidential election
- 2024 Democratic Party presidential primaries
- 2024 Republican Party presidential primaries
- 2024 United States elections

== Notes ==
Partisan clients
