= 2024 United States presidential election in Alaska =

- November 5, 2024
- Turnout: 55.80% (▼4.87 pp)

Nominee	Donald Trump	Kamala Harris
Party	Republican	Democratic
Home state	Florida	California
Running mate	JD Vance	Tim Walz
Electoral vote	3	0
Popular vote	184,458	140,026
Percentage	54.54%	41.41%

Trump
40–50%
50–60%
60–70%
70–80%
80–90%
90–100%
Harris
40–50%
50–60%
60–70%
70–80%
80–90%
90–100%
Tie/No data
President before election
Joe Biden
Democratic
Elected President
Donald Trump
Republican

The 2024 United States presidential election in Alaska took place on November 5, 2024, as part of the broader 2024 United States presidential election. Former President Donald Trump, the Republican nominee, defeated Democratic Vice President Kamala Harris to secure Alaska's three votes in the Electoral College. This was the first presidential election following the state's adoption of ranked-choice voting for all statewide general elections, though a second round was not triggered because Trump secured a majority of the vote outright.

Analysts widely viewed Trump as the favorite to carry Alaska – which has not backed a Democrat for president since Lyndon B. Johnson in 1964 – in the lead-up to Election Day. Trump ultimately won the state by 13 points, a three-point improvement over his margin of victory in 2020. He flipped three county-equivalents from the prior election in the process: Lake and Peninsula and Northwest Arctic boroughs, as well as Dillingham Census Area.

== Primary elections ==
=== Republican caucus ===
The Alaska Republican caucuses were held on Super Tuesday, March 5, 2024.

Alaska Republican primary, March 5, 2024
Candidate	Votes	Percentage	Actual delegate count		
Candidate	Votes	Percentage	Bound	Unbound	Total
Donald Trump	9,243	87.58%	29		29
Nikki Haley	1,266	12.00%			
Vivek Ramaswamy (withdrawn)	45	0.43%			
Total:	10,554	100.00%	29		29

=== Democratic caucus ===
The Alaska Democratic caucus was held on April 13, 2024. Joe Biden was the only person on the ballot and won the caucus via voice vote with 15 pledged delegates.

Alaska Democratic caucuses, April 13, 2024
Candidate	Votes	Percentage	Actual delegate count		
Candidate	Votes	Percentage	Bound	Unbound	Total
Joe Biden (incumbent)	Voice vote		15		15
Total:			15		15

== General election ==
=== Candidates ===
The following candidates qualified for the general election:

- Kamala Harris / Tim Walz — Democratic
- Robert F. Kennedy Jr. / Nicole Shanahan — Independent (Note: Kennedy suspended his campaign on August 23, after the deadline for independent candidates had passed, and thus remained on the ballot.)
- Chase Oliver / Mike ter Maat — Libertarian
- Peter Sonski / Lauren Onak — American Solidarity Party
- Jill Stein / Butch Ware — Independent (national Green nominee) (Note: The national Green Party nominated Stein and Ware for their presidential ticket. The Green Party of Alaska, a separate entity which was decertified from the national Green Party in 2021, nominated Jasmine Sherman with Tanda BluBear as her running mate. Stein qualified for the ballot by petition and was listed without party affiliation, while Sherman did not make the ballot.)
- Randall Terry / Stephen Broden — Constitution
- Donald Trump / JD Vance — Republican
- Cornel West / Melina Abdullah — Aurora

Voters did not have the option to write in candidates for president and vice president. This was the first presidential election in Alaska to use ranked choice (instant runoff) voting.

Independent candidate Cornel West appeared on the ballot as the nominee of the Aurora Party, a party that only exists in Alaska and only has ballot access for presidential elections.

=== Predictions ===
Source	Ranking	As of
The Cook Political Report	Solid R	December 19, 2023
Inside Elections	Solid R	April 26, 2023
Sabato's Crystal Ball	Safe R	June 13, 2024
Decision Desk HQ/The Hill	Safe R	August 26, 2024
CNalysis	Very Likely R	September 15, 2024
CNN	Solid R	January 14, 2024
The Economist	Safe R	November 3, 2024
538	Likely R	June 11, 2024
NBC News	Safe R	October 6, 2024
YouGov	Solid R	November 1, 2024
Split Ticket	Likely R	November 1, 2024

=== Polling ===
Donald Trump vs. Kamala Harris

Poll source	Date(s) administered	Sample size (Note: Key: A – all adults RV – registered voters LV – likely voters V – unclear)	Margin of error	Donald Trump Republican	Kamala Harris Democratic	Other / Undecided
Alaska Survey Research	October 20–22, 2024	1,703 (LV)	± 2.4%	55%	45%	–
Alaska Survey Research	October 8–9, 2024	1,254 (LV)	± 2.9%	54%	46%	–
Cygnal (R) (Note: Poll sponsored by Nick Begich's campaign for U.S. House and the National Republican Congressional Committee)	August 30 – September 1, 2024	400 (LV)	± 4.9%	53%	43%	4%

Donald Trump vs. Kamala Harris vs. Robert F. Kennedy Jr.

Poll source	Date(s) administered	Sample size	Margin of error	Donald Trump Republican	Kamala Harris Democratic	Robert F. Kennedy Jr. Independent	Other / Undecided
Alaska Survey Research	October 20–22, 2024	1,703 (LV)	± 2.4%	51%	43%	7%	–
Alaska Survey Research	October 8–9, 2024	1,254 (LV)	± 2.9%	50%	43%	7%	–
Alaska Survey Research	September 27–29, 2024	1,182 (LV)	± 2.9%	52%	43%	6%	–
Alaska Survey Research	September 11–12, 2024	1,254 (LV)	–	47%	42%	5%	6%

Hypothetical polling with Donald Trump and Joe Biden

Donald Trump vs. Joe Biden

Poll source	Date(s) administered	Sample size	Margin of error	Donald Trump Republican	Joe Biden Democratic	Other / Undecided
	July 21, 2024	Joe Biden withdraws from the race.				
John Zogby Strategies (Note: Poll conducted for Kennedy's campaign)	April 13–21, 2024	248 (LV)	–	50%	43%	7%
Data for Progress (D)	February 23 – March 2, 2024	1,120 (LV)	± 3.0%	53%	41%	6%
Alaska Survey Research	October 13–18, 2023	1,375 (LV)	–	45%	37%	19%
Alaska Survey Research	July 18–21, 2023	1,336 (LV)	–	43%	36%	21%

Donald Trump vs. Joe Biden vs. Robert F. Kennedy Jr.

Poll source	Date(s) administered	Sample size	Margin of error	Donald Trump Republican	Joe Biden Democratic	Robert F. Kennedy Jr. Independent	Other / Undecided
	July 21, 2024	Joe Biden withdraws from the race.					
Alaska Survey Research	October 13–18, 2023	1,375 (LV)	–	37%	29%	17%	17%

Hypothetical polling with other candidates

Donald Trump vs. Robert F. Kennedy Jr.

Poll source	Date(s) administered	Sample size	Margin of error	Donald Trump Republican	Robert F. Kennedy Jr. Independent	Other / Undecided
John Zogby Strategies	April 13–21, 2024	248 (LV)	–	48%	41%	11%

Robert F. Kennedy Jr. vs. Joe Biden

Poll source	Date(s) administered	Sample size	Margin of error	Robert F. Kennedy Jr. Independent	Joe Biden Democratic	Other / Undecided
John Zogby Strategies	April 13–21, 2024	248 (LV)	–	50%	37%	13%

=== Electoral slates ===
The following individuals were nominated as presidential electors:

Kamala Harris and Tim Walz Democratic Party	Donald Trump and JD Vance Republican Party	Chase Oliver and Mike ter Maat Libertarian Party	Peter Sonski and Lauren Onak American Solidarity	Cornel West and Melina Abdullah Aurora Party	Randall Terry and Stephen Broden Constitution Party	Jill Stein and Butch Ware Independent	Robert F. Kennedy Jr. and Nicole Shanahan Independent
James D. Arlington; Frances Degnan; Fay Herold	Eileen Becker; Ron Johnson; Richard Whitbeck	Nicholas Conrad; Carolyn Clift; Devin Homan	Peter Knox; Timothy Main; Anna Sherman	Marcus Belk; Jonathan Alexander; Robert S. Mulford	Karen Murray; Bethany Cruz; Claire Cruz	Michael Klensch; Gregory Sorenson; Drew Sorenson	Margaret M. Testarmata; Ray G. Southwell; Karen M. Gorton

=== Results ===
2024 United States presidential election in Alaska
Party	Candidate			
Party	Candidate	Votes	%	±%
Republican	Donald Trump; JD Vance	184,458	54.54%	+1.71%
Democratic	Kamala Harris; Tim Walz	140,026	41.41%	-1.36%
Independent	Robert F. Kennedy Jr. (withdrawn); Nicole Shanahan (withdrawn)	5,670	1.68%	N/A
Libertarian	Chase Oliver; Mike ter Maat	3,040	0.90%	-2.38%
Independent	Jill Stein; Butch Ware	2,342	0.69%	N/A
Aurora	Cornel West; Melina Abdullah	1,127	0.33%	N/A
Constitution	Randall Terry; Stephen Broden	812	0.24%	-0.07%
American Solidarity	Peter Sonski; Lauren Onak	702	0.21%	N/A
Total votes		338,177	100.00%	

==== By State House district ====
Unlike every other U.S. state, Alaska is not divided into counties or parishes. Rather, it is administratively divided into 20 boroughs: 19 organized and 1 unorganized, which act as county equivalents. The Unorganized Borough lacks a borough government structure and itself is divided into eleven census areas. Contrary to election results in most states, official results by borough are not available – rather, they are estimates based on precinct-level data. However, the Alaska Division of Elections does release official results by State House district, which are listed in the table below. Trump won 24 districts to Harris's 16.

State House District	Donald Trump Republican		Kamala Harris Democratic		All Others		Margin		Total votes
State House District	Votes	%	Votes	%	Votes	%	Votes	%	Total votes
1	4,861	56.6%	3,367	39.2%	356	4.2%	1,494	17.4%	8,584
2	4,534	47.4%	4,571	47.8%	458	4.9%	37	0.1%	9,563
3	4,496	40.5%	6,130	55.2%	481	4.4%	1,634	14.7%	11,107
4	2,691	29.0%	6,161	66.5%	418	4.5%	3,470	37.5%	9,270
5	4,351	54.3%	3,328	41.5%	259	4.2%	1,023	13.8%	7,938
6	6,705	55.9%	4,773	39.8%	522	4.3%	1,932	16.1%	12,000
7	6,777	70.5%	2,513	26.2%	319	2.6%	4,264	44.3%	9,609
8	7,950	73.6%	2,576	23.8%	279	2.6%	5,374	49.8%	10,805
9	5,581	47.2%	5,849	49.4%	406	3.5%	268	2.2%	11,836
10	4,357	49.7%	4,070	46.4%	336	3.9%	287	3.3%	8,763
11	4,864	49.4%	4,633	47.1%	343	3.5%	231	2.3%	9,840
12	4,059	47.7%	4,169	49.0%	287	3.3%	110	1.3%	8,515
13	3,589	47.4%	3,682	48.6%	306	4.0%	93	1.2%	7,577
14	2,768	37.3%	4,346	58.5%	312	4.2%	1,578	21.2%	7,426
15	4,594	49.4%	4,364	47.0%	335	3.7%	630	2.4%	9,293
16	3,929	40.6%	4,344	55.3%	396	4.1%	1,415	14.7%	8,669
17	2,407	31.2%	4,990	64.7%	321	4.1%	2,583	33.5%	7,718
18	2,686	55.8%	1,928	40.0%	202	4.1%	758	15.8%	4,816
19	1,971	39.2%	2,825	56.2%	229	4.6%	854	17.0%	5,025
20	3,041	41.8%	3,924	54.0%	302	4.2%	883	12.2%	7,267
21	3,984	44.1%	4,711	52.1%	348	3.9%	727	8.0%	9,043
22	2,594	47.5%	2,660	48.7%	209	3.8%	66	1.2%	5,463
23	6,101	57.1%	4,116	38.5%	468	4.4%	1,985	18.6%	10,685
24	6,482	64.1%	3,234	32.0%	402	4.0%	3,248	32.1%	10,118
25	6,891	65.9%	3,172	30.3%	397	3.9%	3,719	35.6%	10,460
26	7,143	75.6%	2,013	21.3%	292	3.0%	5,130	54.3%	9,448
27	6,785	76.6%	1,807	20.4%	268	3.0%	4,978	56.2%	8,860
28	6,713	72.3%	2,213	23.8%	353	3.7%	4,500	49.5%	9,279
29	7,418	70.6%	2,708	25.8%	374	3.6%	4,710	44.8%	10,500
30	7,312	70.9%	2,701	26.2%	293	2.8%	4,611	44.7%	10,306
31	3,475	49.6%	3,240	46.3%	288	4.1%	235	3.3%	7,003
32	3,742	63.8%	1,883	32.1%	239	4.2%	1,859	31.7%	5,864
33	6,548	73.9%	2,016	22.8%	295	3.4%	4,532	51.1%	8,859
34	5,836	58.3%	3,759	37.5%	417	4.2%	2,077	20.8%	10,012
35	4,395	45.2%	4,885	50.2%	452	4.5%	490	5.0%	9,732
36	5,633	58.7%	3,538	36.9%	427	4.6%	2,095	21.8%	9,598
37	2,208	50.8%	1,921	44.2%	221	5.1%	297	6.6%	4,350
38	1,558	39.0%	2,028	50.8%	408	10.2%	470	11.8%	3,994
39	1,690	40.2%	2,180	51.8%	336	8.0%	490	11.6%	4,206
40	1,688	51.3%	1,362	41.4%	243	7.4%	326	9.9%	3,293
Total	184,458	54.5%	140,026	41.4%	13,693	4.0%	44,432	13.1%	338,177

==== By borough and census area (estimates) ====
Borough / census area	Donald Trump Republican		Kamala Harris Democratic		All Others		Margin		Total votes
Borough / census area	Votes	%	Votes	%	Votes	%	Votes	%	Total votes
Aleutians East Borough	288	66.67%	125	28.94%	19	4.40%	163	37.73%	432
Aleutians West Census Area	469	48.30%	474	48.82%	28	2.88%	-5	-0.51%	971
Anchorage Municipality	62,925	47.35%	64,781	48.74%	5,193	3.91%	-1,856	-1.40%	132,899
Bethel Census Area	1,622	37.99%	2,181	51.09%	466	10.92%	-559	-13.09%	4,269
Bristol Bay Borough	254	61.65%	139	33.74%	19	4.61%	115	27.91%	412
Chugach Census Area	1,807	56.70%	1,246	39.10%	134	4.20%	561	17.60%	3,187
Copper River Census Area	995	69.63%	359	25.12%	75	5.25%	636	44.51%	1,429
Denali Borough	754	58.40%	484	37.49%	53	4.11%	270	20.91%	1,291
Dillingham Census Area	763	50.70%	670	44.52%	72	4.78%	93	6.18%	1,505
Fairbanks North Star Borough	24,857	56.90%	17,037	39.00%	1,791	4.10%	7,820	17.90%	43,685
Haines Borough	791	44.09%	908	50.61%	95	5.30%	-117	-6.52%	1,794
Hoonah-Angoon Census Area	548	36.17%	876	57.82%	91	6.01%	-328	-21.65%	1,515
Juneau City and Borough	5,942	35.00%	10,305	60.70%	730	4.30%	-4,363	-25.70%	16,977
Kenai Peninsula Borough	21,861	65.50%	10,347	31.00%	1,168	3.50%	11,514	34.50%	33,376
Ketchikan Gateway Borough	3,738	57.50%	2,496	38.39%	267	4.11%	1,242	19.10%	6,501
Kodiak Island Borough	3,547	56.61%	2,469	39.40%	250	3.99%	1,078	17.20%	6,266
Kusilvak Census Area	579	36.88%	820	52.23%	171	10.89%	-241	-15.35%	1,570
Lake and Peninsula Borough	230	52.04%	175	39.59%	37	8.37%	55	12.44%	442
Matanuska-Susitna Borough	40,140	72.50%	13,343	24.10%	1,882	3.40%	26,797	48.40%	55,365
Nome Census Area	1,167	41.78%	1,424	50.98%	202	7.23%	-257	-9.20%	2,793
North Slope Borough	939	54.28%	690	39.88%	101	5.84%	249	14.39%	1,730
Northwest Arctic Borough	713	47.50%	648	43.17%	140	9.33%	65	4.33%	1,501
Petersburg Borough	970	57.13%	640	37.69%	88	5.18%	330	19.43%	1,698
Prince of Wales-Hyder Census Area	1,735	49.70%	1,588	45.49%	168	4.81%	147	4.21%	3,491
Sitka City and Borough	1,659	42.92%	2,057	53.22%	149	3.86%	-398	-10.30%	3,865
Skagway Municipality	265	25.63%	717	69.34%	52	5.03%	-452	-43.71%	1,034
Southeast Fairbanks Census Area	2,846	81.90%	528	15.19%	101	2.91%	2,318	66.71%	3,475
Wrangell City and Borough	745	65.58%	359	31.60%	32	2.82%	386	33.98%	1,136
Yakutat City and Borough	179	38.00%	271	57.54%	21	4.46%	-92	-19.53%	471
Yukon-Koyukuk Census Area	851	35.80%	1,386	58.31%	140	5.89%	-535	-22.51%	2,377

Boroughs and census areas that flipped from Democratic to Republican

- Dillingham Census Area (largest city: Dillingham)
- Lake and Peninsula Borough (largest city: Port Alsworth)
- Northwest Arctic Borough (largest city: Kotzebue)

=== By congressional district ===
Due to the state's low population, only one congressional district is allocated. This district, an at-large district because it covers the entire state, is thus equivalent to the statewide election results.

District	Trump	Harris	Representative
At-large	54.54%	41.41%	Mary Peltola
At-large	54.54%	41.41%	Nick Begich III

== Analysis ==
Since Alaska started voting in presidential elections in 1960, the only time its electoral votes have not gone to the Republican nominee was when incumbent Democrat Lyndon Johnson won in a landslide in 1964. Alaska is the only Republican-leaning state on the West Coast of the United States. In 2024 Donald Trump carried Alaska by 13 percentage points, similar to Mitt Romney's 14-point margin in 2012.

Compared to his 2020 electoral performance, in which he carried the state by 10 percentage points, Trump improved in virtually all of the state, particularly areas in the north and west with large Alaska Native populations. Harris managed to narrowly retain Anchorage for the Democrats; Trump became the first Republican to win the White House without winning the city since Alaskan statehood. Key to Trump's victory in the state was landslide margins to his favor in the Kenai Peninsula and Matanuska-Susitna Valley. He even managed to obtain over 80% of the vote in the sparsely populated Southeast Fairbanks Census Area. Harris's best area was Juneau, the state capital. This was the first election since 2008 in which Republicans carried a majority of boroughs and census areas.

== See also ==
- United States presidential elections in Alaska
- 2024 United States presidential election
- 2024 Democratic Party presidential primaries
- 2024 Republican Party presidential primaries
- 2024 Alaska elections
- 2024 United States elections

== Notes ==
Partisan clients
