= Brian T. Carroll =

American teacher and political candidate (born 1949)

- Carroll in 2019
- Born: December 15, 1949 (age 76); Los Angeles, California, U.S.
- Education: University of California, Los Angeles (BA)
- Occupation: Teacher
- Political party: American Solidarity
- Movement: Christian democracy
- Children: 5
- Website: briancarroll.life

Brian Thomas Carroll (born December 15, 1949) is an American teacher who was the American Solidarity Party's presidential nominee in the 2020 United States presidential election. He is a proponent of Christian democracy.

== Life and career ==
Brian Thomas Carroll was born on December 15, 1949, in Los Angeles, California. He received his bachelor's degree in history from UCLA and earned a teaching credential at California State University, Los Angeles. He taught junior high history and other subjects in Farmersville, California from 1977 to 1983. During that time, he also wrote for the Valley Voice newspaper, focusing primarily on the local need for public transportation.

Carroll has taught students in Colombia and China and traveled extensively throughout Europe and Brazil. As an amateur naturalist, his work has been cited in studies on spiders and insects. In 2008, he returned to teaching in Farmersville.

== 2018 California congressional campaign ==
Carroll ran for California's twenty-second congressional district in 2018, campaigning against Republican incumbent Devin Nunes and Democrat Andrew Janz. This was a contentious election due to Nunes' role in the 2018 Trump–Russia investigation. Carroll received 1,591 votes in the top-two primary, placing fifth in a field of six candidates. During the general election (after Carroll's elimination), Janz claimed that Carroll had endorsed him; Carroll publicly denied this claim.

California's 22nd congressional district election, 2018
Primary election
Party	Candidate	Votes	%
Republican	Devin Nunes (incumbent)	70,112	57.6
Democratic	Andrew Janz	38,596	31.7
Democratic	Bobby Bliatout	6,002	4.9
Democratic	Ricardo "Rico" Franco	4,365	3.6
No party preference	Brian Carroll (Note: Although the candidate was officially affiliated with the American Solidarity Party, because the party did not have ballot access in California at the time of the election, the candidate was listed on the ballot as having "no party preference".)	1,591	1.3
Libertarian	Bill Merryman	1,137	0.9
Total votes		121,803	100.0

== 2020 presidential campaign ==
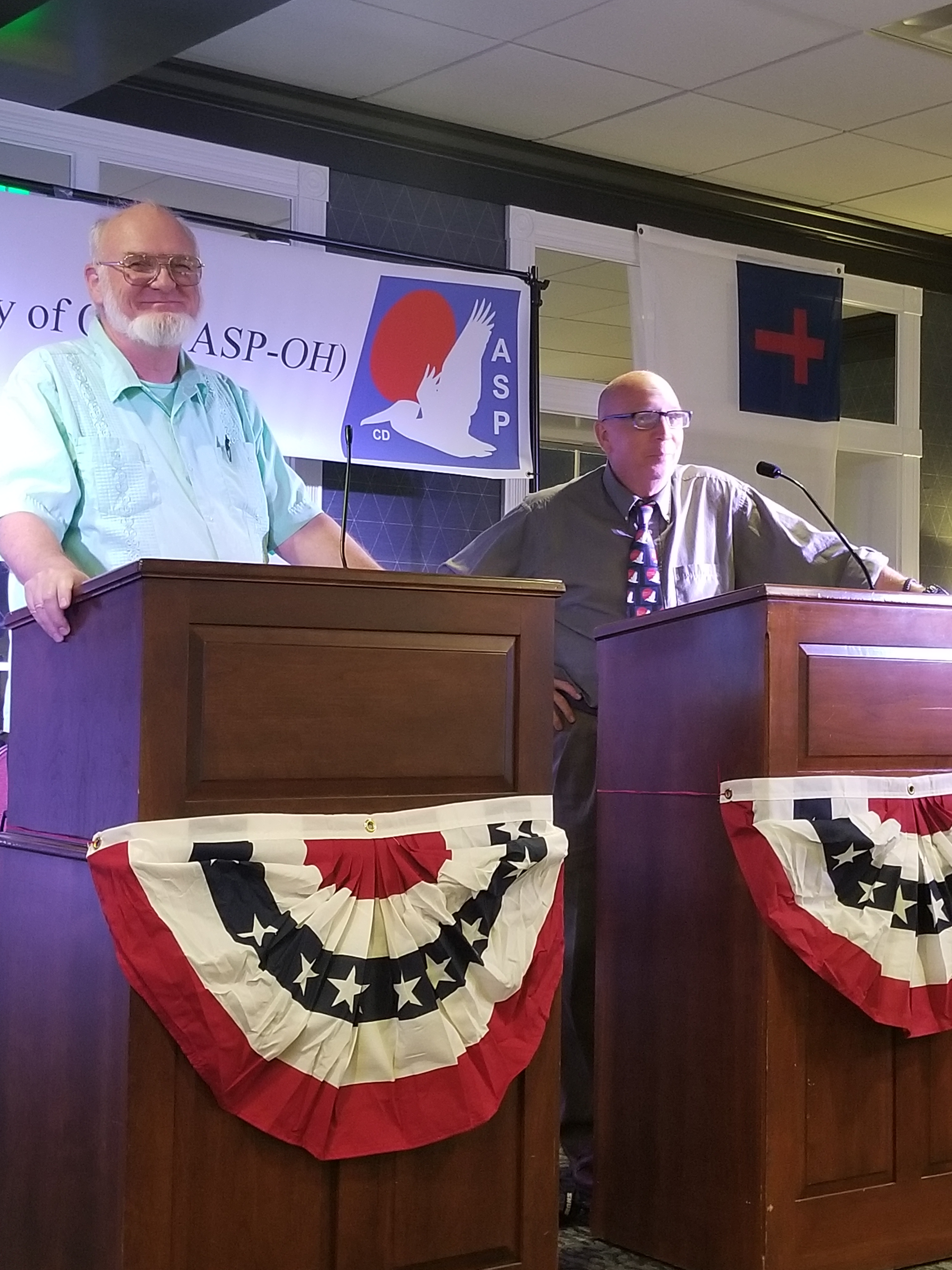
Carroll (left) and Joe Schriner (right) who both vied to be the presidential candidate for the American Solidarity Party, participated in a live presidential debate at the 2019 ASP Midwestern Regional Meeting, which was held at Walnut Creek, Ohio.

On April 5, 2019, Carroll declared his candidacy for President of the United States in the 2020 United States presidential election, seeking the nomination of the American Solidarity Party. He won the nomination at the online party convention, and chose ASP chair Amar Patel as his running mate.

Carroll notably spoke at the Rehumanize Conference in New Orleans, a speaking engagement at the Presidential Politics Conference of Iowa at Dordt University that was also attended by Republican candidate Joe Walsh and Democratic candidate Tulsi Gabbard. He participated in a Free & Equal Elections Foundation presidential debate, alongside minor candidates of various parties.

Carroll and his running mate Patel were on the ballot in eight states and certified as write-in candidates in 31 states. They received over 42,000 votes nationwide.

=== Endorsements ===
List of Brian T. Carroll endorsements (2020)

Individuals

- Howard Ahmanson Jr., philanthropist and writer
- Stephen Bainbridge, UCLA professor
- Charles Camosy, associate professor of theological and social ethics at Fordham University
- Rod Dreher, author and blogger, former senior editor at The American Conservative
- Charles Marohn, author of Strong Towns: A Bottom-Up Revolution to Rebuild American Prosperity
- George Yancey, sociologist and professor of sociology at Baylor University

Organizations

- Leonine Institute for Catholic Social Teaching
- Italian Community of St Louis

== Political positions ==
Carroll ran on a platform that espouses the political ideology of Christian democracy, which emphasizes Chestertonian distributism as an alternative to capitalism (which he opposes), a consistent life ethic, universal healthcare, climate and environmental stewardship, social justice and reconciliation, and a more peaceful world. His positions are similar to those espoused by other Christian Democratic parties in many European and Latin American countries.

Carroll subscribes to a consistent life ethic which opposes abortion, euthanasia, and the death penalty, while advocating for progressive and social justice issues. He supports Deferred Action for Childhood Arrivals, ranked choice voting, the breakup of companies such as Amazon and Google, amnesty for David Daleiden, diverting some police and military funding to community resources, ending private prisons, rehabilitation rather than incarceration for drug possession, and red flag laws. He is anti-abortion, and has said that being pro-life "obviously, is more than abortion" in reference to elderly people endangered by the COVID-19 pandemic.

== Personal life ==
Carroll has been married for 46 years, and has five children and 14 grandchildren. An elder in the Evangelical Covenant Church, a Pietist denomination, Carroll considers himself an Evangelical Christian.
