= 2024 United States presidential election in West Virginia =

- November 5, 2024
- Turnout: 63.69% (▲0.44 pp)

Nominee	Donald Trump	Kamala Harris
Party	Republican	Democratic
Home state	Florida	California
Running mate	JD Vance	Tim Walz
Electoral vote	4	0
Popular vote	533,556	214,309
Percentage	69.97%	28.10%

Trump
40–50%
50–60%
60–70%
70–80%
80–90%
90–100%
Harris
40–50%
50–60%
60–70%
70–80%
80–90%
90–100%
Tie/No data
President before election
Joe Biden
Democratic
Elected President
Donald Trump
Republican

The 2024 United States presidential election in West Virginia took place on Tuesday, November 5, 2024, as part of the 2024 United States presidential election in which all 50 states plus the District of Columbia participated. West Virginia voters chose electors to represent them in the Electoral College via a popular vote. The state of West Virginia has four electoral votes in the Electoral College, following reapportionment due to the 2020 United States census in which the state lost one congressional seat.

Republican Donald Trump easily won West Virginia a third time in 2024, with a 41.9% margin of victory and just under 70% of the vote. The state had gone to the Republicans for a party record of seven consecutive presidential elections since 2000, and it had been Trump's strongest state in 2016 and his second-strongest in 2020. As a result, West Virginia was projected to be a safe red state before the 2024 election.

This marks the fourth presidential election, both consecutively and ever, in which the Republican won every county in West Virginia. Trump's 69.97% of the vote is the highest percentage any party has won in the state's history of presidential elections.

Meanwhile, neighboring Virginia voted for Harris, with the two states differing by 48 percentage points in margin.

== Primary elections ==
=== Democratic primary ===
The West Virginia Democratic presidential primary was held on May 14, 2024, alongside the Maryland and Nebraska primaries. 25 delegates (20 pledged and 5 unpledged) to the Democratic National Convention were allocated to presidential candidates.

Four candidates have been certified to appear on the primary ballot:

- Joe Biden
- Stephen Lyons
- Armando Perez-Serrato
- Dean Phillips

==== Results ====
West Virginia Democratic primary, May 14, 2024
Candidate	Votes	%	Delegates
Joe Biden (incumbent)	68,165	70.55	20
Jason Palmer	11,079	11.47	0
Stephen Lyons (withdrawn)	7,372	7.63	0
Dean Phillips (withdrawn)	7,223	7.48	0
Armando Perez-Serrato	2,787	2.88	0
Total	96,626	100%	20

=== Republican primary ===
The West Virginia Republican presidential primary was held on May 14, 2024, alongside the Maryland and Nebraska primaries. 31 delegates to the 2024 Republican National Convention were allocated on a winner-take-all basis.

Five candidates have been certified to appear on the primary ballot:

- Ryan Binkley
- Nikki Haley
- David Stuckenberg
- Rachel Swift
- Donald Trump

==== Results ====
West Virginia Republican primary, May 14, 2024
Candidate	Votes	Percentage	Actual delegate count		
Candidate	Votes	Percentage	Bound	Unbound	Total
Donald Trump	199,497	88.4%	32		32
Nikki Haley (withdrawn)	21,231	9.4%			
Rachel Swift	2,326	1.0%			
Ryan Binkley (withdrawn)	1,481	0.7%			
David Stuckenberg	1,168	0.5%			
Total:	225,703	100.0%	32		32

=== Mountain primary ===
The Mountain primary (the state's Green Party affiliate) was held on May 14, 2024.

Only one candidate was certified to appear on the primary ballot, who will receive all 4 of the state's pledged delegates:

- Jill Stein

== General election ==
=== Predictions ===
Source	Ranking	As of
Cook Political Report	Solid R	December 19, 2023
Inside Elections	Solid R	April 26, 2023
Sabato's Crystal Ball	Safe R	June 29, 2023
Decision Desk HQ/The Hill	Safe R	December 14, 2023
CNalysis	Solid R	December 30, 2023
CNN	Solid R	January 14, 2024
The Economist	Safe R	June 12, 2024
538	Solid R	June 11, 2024
RCP	Solid R	June 26, 2024
NBC News	Safe R	October 6, 2024

=== Polling ===
Donald Trump vs. Kamala Harris

Poll source	Date(s) administered	Sample size (Note: Key: A – all adults RV – registered voters LV – likely voters V – unclear)	Margin of error	Donald Trump Republican	Kamala Harris Democratic	Other / Undecided
Research America (Note: Poll sponsored by West Virginia MetroNews)	August 21–27, 2024	400 (RV)	± 4.9%	61%	34%	5%

Hypothetical polling with Donald Trump and Joe Biden

Donald Trump vs. Joe Biden

Poll source	Date(s) administered	Sample size	Margin of error	Donald Trump Republican	Joe Biden Democratic	Other / Undecided
John Zogby Strategies (Note: Poll conducted for Kennedy's campaign)	April 13–21, 2024	383 (LV)	–	63%	31%	6%
Emerson College	October 1–4, 2023	539 (RV)	± 4.2%	59%	23%	18%

Donald Trump vs. Joe Biden vs. Jill Stein

Poll source	Date(s) administered	Sample size	Margin of error	Donald Trump Republican	Joe Biden Democratic	Jill Stein Mountain	Other / Undecided
Kaplan Strategies	June 4, 2024	464 (LV)	± 4.6%	55%	28%	2%	15%

Hypothetical polling with other candidates

Donald Trump vs. Robert F. Kennedy Jr.

Poll source	Date(s) administered	Sample size	Margin of error	Donald Trump Republican	Robert F. Kennedy Jr. Independent	Other / Undecided
John Zogby Strategies	April 13–21, 2024	383 (LV)	–	58%	30%	12%

Robert F. Kennedy Jr. vs. Joe Biden

Poll source	Date(s) administered	Sample size	Margin of error	Robert F. Kennedy Jr. Independent	Joe Biden Democratic	Other / Undecided
John Zogby Strategies	April 13–21, 2024	383 (LV)	–	54%	29%	17%

=== Results ===
State House of Delegates district results: Trump 50–60% 60–70% 70–80% 80–90% / Harris 50–60% 60–70%

2024 United States presidential election in West Virginia
Party	Candidate	Votes	%	±%
Republican	Donald Trump; JD Vance	533,556	69.97	+1.35%
Democratic	Kamala Harris; Tim Walz	214,309	28.10	−1.59%
Independent	Robert F. Kennedy Jr. (withdrawn); Nicole Shanahan (withdrawn)	8,947	1.17	N/A
Libertarian	Chase Oliver; Mike ter Maat	3,047	0.40	−0.94%
Mountain	Jill Stein; Butch Ware	2,531	0.33	−
Socialism and Liberation	Claudia De la Cruz (write-in); Karina Garcia (write-in)	73	0.01	+0.01%
American Solidarity	Peter Sonski (write-in); Lauren Onak (write-in)	63	0.01	N/A
Independent	Cornel West (write-in); Melina Abdullah (write-in)	39	0.01	N/A
Independent	Shiva Ayyadurai (write-in); Crystal Ellis (write-in)	10	0.00	N/A
Write-in		9	0.00	−0.01%
Total votes		762,584	100.00	N/A

==== By county ====
County	Donald Trump Republican		Kamala Harris Democratic		Various candidates Other parties		Margin		Total
County	#	%	#	%	#	%	#	%	Total
Barbour	5,071	79.30%	1,199	18.75%	125	1.95%	3,872	60.55%	6,395
Berkeley	37,580	66.99%	17,500	31.19%	1,022	1.82%	20,080	35.79%	56,102
Boone	6,314	77.55%	1,641	20.15%	187	2.30%	4,673	57.39%	8,142
Braxton	3,991	75.12%	1,233	23.21%	89	1.68%	2,758	51.91%	5,313
Brooke	6,986	71.42%	2,621	26.79%	175	1.79%	4,365	44.62%	9,782
Cabell	21,229	59.92%	13,474	38.03%	726	2.05%	7,755	21.89%	35,429
Calhoun	2,391	81.44%	488	16.62%	57	1.94%	1,903	64.82%	2,936
Clay	2,597	80.15%	580	17.90%	63	1.94%	2,017	62.25%	3,240
Doddridge	2,541	85.96%	374	12.65%	41	1.39%	2,167	73.31%	2,956
Fayette	10,910	69.85%	4,387	28.09%	323	2.07%	6,523	41.76%	15,620
Gilmer	1,822	77.73%	486	20.73%	36	1.54%	1,336	57.00%	2,344
Grant	4,949	88.88%	552	9.91%	67	1.20%	4,397	78.97%	5,568
Greenbrier	10,517	70.13%	4,196	27.98%	283	1.89%	6,321	42.15%	14,996
Hampshire	8,464	80.61%	1,890	18.00%	146	1.39%	6,574	62.61%	10,500
Hancock	9,462	72.62%	3,360	25.79%	208	1.60%	6,102	46.83%	13,030
Hardy	4,997	77.94%	1,297	20.23%	117	1.82%	3,700	57.71%	6,411
Harrison	20,480	69.44%	8,402	28.49%	613	2.08%	12,078	40.95%	29,495
Jackson	9,907	77.27%	2,699	21.05%	216	1.68%	7,208	56.22%	12,822
Jefferson	16,573	56.84%	11,967	41.04%	616	2.11%	4,606	15.80%	29,156
Kanawha	43,352	57.62%	30,231	40.18%	1,656	2.20%	13,121	17.44%	75,239
Lewis	5,550	78.75%	1,372	19.47%	126	1.79%	4,178	59.28%	7,048
Lincoln	5,770	80.28%	1,279	17.80%	138	1.92%	4,491	62.49%	7,187
Logan	9,500	82.83%	1,848	16.11%	121	1.06%	7,652	66.72%	11,469
Marion	15,881	64.47%	8,185	33.23%	568	2.31%	7,696	31.24%	24,634
Marshall	9,808	74.12%	3,186	24.08%	239	1.81%	6,622	50.04%	13,233
Mason	8,232	78.05%	2,111	20.02%	204	1.93%	6,121	58.04%	10,547
McDowell	4,310	79.45%	1,036	19.10%	79	1.46%	3,274	60.35%	5,425
Mercer	18,372	77.90%	4,851	20.57%	361	1.53%	13,521	57.33%	23,584
Mineral	10,247	79.41%	2,483	19.24%	174	1.35%	7,764	60.17%	12,904
Mingo	7,325	86.28%	1,061	12.50%	104	1.22%	6,264	73.78%	8,490
Monongalia	21,084	50.86%	19,265	46.48%	1,103	2.66%	1,819	4.39%	41,452
Monroe	5,089	79.93%	1,155	18.14%	123	1.93%	3,934	61.79%	6,367
Morgan	7,009	77.05%	1,947	21.40%	141	1.55%	5,062	55.64%	9,097
Nicholas	7,960	79.31%	1,919	19.12%	158	1.57%	6,041	60.19%	10,037
Ohio	11,593	62.03%	6,727	35.99%	369	1.97%	4,866	26.04%	18,689
Pendleton	2,687	78.45%	680	19.85%	58	1.69%	2,007	58.60%	3,425
Pleasants	2,632	78.61%	656	19.59%	60	1.79%	1,976	59.02%	3,348
Pocahontas	2,889	74.06%	927	23.76%	85	2.18%	1,962	50.29%	3,901
Preston	11,176	77.47%	2,953	20.47%	297	2.06%	8,223	57.00%	14,426
Putnam	19,868	72.23%	7,124	25.90%	515	1.87%	12,744	46.33%	27,507
Raleigh	23,644	76.35%	6,816	22.01%	506	1.63%	16,828	54.34%	30,966
Randolph	8,356	72.07%	3,008	25.94%	230	1.98%	5,348	46.13%	11,594
Ritchie	3,473	85.75%	517	12.77%	60	1.48%	2,956	72.99%	4,050
Roane	4,189	75.87%	1,218	22.06%	114	2.06%	2,971	53.81%	5,521
Summers	3,931	74.68%	1,226	23.29%	107	2.03%	2,705	51.39%	5,264
Taylor	5,422	74.63%	1,694	23.32%	149	2.05%	3,728	51.31%	7,265
Tucker	2,669	73.40%	890	24.48%	77	2.12%	1,779	48.93%	3,636
Tyler	2,991	82.69%	554	15.32%	72	1.99%	2,437	67.38%	3,617
Upshur	7,633	77.42%	2,033	20.62%	193	1.96%	5,600	56.80%	9,859
Wayne	11,934	75.79%	3,532	22.43%	281	1.78%	8,402	53.36%	15,747
Webster	2,478	82.66%	479	15.98%	41	1.37%	1,999	66.68%	2,998
Wetzel	4,718	76.49%	1,294	20.98%	156	2.53%	3,424	55.51%	6,168
Wirt	2,120	82.14%	409	15.85%	52	2.01%	1,711	66.29%	2,581
Wood	26,380	70.70%	10,317	27.65%	616	1.65%	16,063	43.05%	37,313
Wyoming	6,503	85.96%	980	12.95%	82	1.08%	5,523	73.01%	7,565
Totals	533,556	69.98%	214,309	28.11%	14,525	1.91%	319,247	41.87%	762,390

==== By congressional district ====
Trump won both congressional districts.

District	Trump	Harris	Representative
1st	71.25%	26.89%	Carol Miller
2nd	68.82%	29.23%	Alex Mooney (118th Congress)
2nd	68.82%	29.23%	Riley Moore (119th Congress)

== See also ==
- United States presidential elections in West Virginia
- 2024 United States presidential election
- 2024 Democratic Party presidential primaries
- 2024 Republican Party presidential primaries
- 2024 United States elections

== Notes ==
Partisan clients
