= 2022 California Secretary of State election =

- November 8, 2022
- Registered: 21,940,274
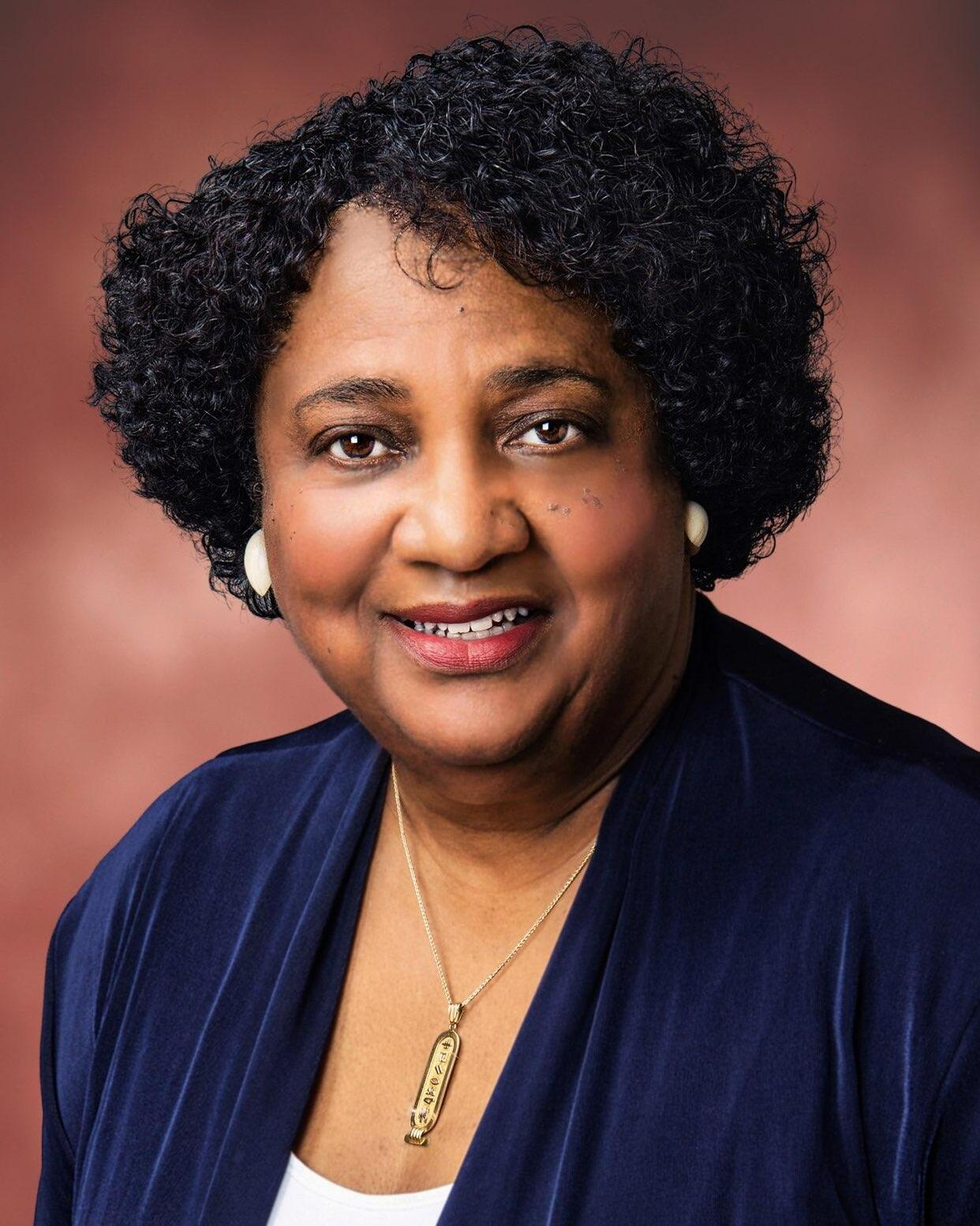

Candidate	Shirley Weber	Rob Bernosky
Party	Democratic	Republican
Popular vote	6,462,164	4,298,530
Percentage	60.05%	39.95%
- Weber: 50–60% 60–70% 70–80% 80–90% Bernosky: 50–60% 60–70% 70–80%
Secretary of State before election
Shirley Weber
Democratic
Elected Secretary of State
Shirley Weber
Democratic

The 2022 California Secretary of State election took place on November 8, 2022, to elect the Secretary of State of California. The primary election was held on June 7, 2022.

Incumbent Democrat Shirley Weber was appointed to the position in December 2020 by governor Gavin Newsom. Newsom had appointed incumbent secretary of state Alex Padilla to succeed Kamala Harris as California's junior U.S. senator after Harris was elected Vice President of the United States in 2020.

== Candidates ==
=== Democratic Party ===
==== Declared ====
- Shirley Weber, incumbent secretary of state

=== Republican Party ===
==== Declared ====
- Rob Bernosky, businessman
- Rachel Hamm, author
- James "JW" Paine, truck driver
- Raul Rodriguez Jr., retired warehouseman

=== Green Party ===
==== Declared ====
- Gary N. Blenner, educator

=== No party preference ===
==== Declared ====
- Matthew D. Cinquanta, private investigator
- Desmond A. Silveira (write-in), software engineer (American Solidarity Party)

== Endorsements ==
Shirley Weber (D)

Organizations

- California Democratic Party
- California Teachers Association
- Courage California
- Equality California
- NARAL Pro-Choice California
- Sierra Club
- Stonewall Democrats
Desmond A. Silveira (ASP)

Political parties

- American Solidarity Party

Individuals

- Brian T. Carroll
- Mike Maturen
Declined to endorse

Organizations

- California Republican Party

== Primary election ==
=== Results ===
Results by county Weber: 30–40%; 40–50%; 50–60%; 60–70%; 70–80%; 80–90%; Bernosky: 20–30%; 30–40%

Primary election results
Party	Candidate	Votes	%
Democratic	Shirley Weber (incumbent)	4,016,798	58.92%
Republican	Rob Bernosky	1,281,587	18.80%
Republican	Rachel Hamm	822,978	12.07%
Republican	James "JW" Paine	254,222	3.73%
Green	Gary N. Blenner	205,630	3.02%
Republican	Raul Rodriguez Jr.	176,059	2.58%
No party preference	Matthew D. Cinquanta	59,481	0.87%
No party preference	Desmond A. Silveira (write-in)	235	0.0%
Total votes		6,816,990	100.0

== General election ==
=== Predictions ===
Source	Ranking	As of
Sabato's Crystal Ball	Safe D	December 1, 2021
Elections Daily	Safe D	November 7, 2022

=== Polling ===
Poll source	Date(s) administered	Sample size (Note: Key: A – all adults RV – registered voters LV – likely voters V – unclear)	Margin of error	Shirley Weber (D)	Rob Bernosky (R)	Undecided
USC	October 30 – November 2, 2022	802 (RV)	± 3.5%	63%	37%	–

=== Results ===
2022 California Secretary of State election
Party	Candidate	Votes	%	±%
Democratic	Shirley Weber (incumbent)	6,462,164	60.05%	−4.40%
Republican	Rob Bernosky	4,298,530	39.95%	+4.40%
Total votes		10,760,694	100.00%	N/A
Democratic hold				

==== By county ====
County	Shirley Weber Democratic		Rob Bernosky Republican		Margin		Total votes cast
County	#	%	#	%	#	%	Total votes cast
Alameda	382,596	79.62%	97,943	20.38%	284,653	59.24%	480,539
Alpine	366	59.80%	246	40.20%	120	19.61%	612
Amador	6,402	34.82%	11,984	65.18%	-5,582	-30.36%	18,386
Butte	32,915	46.06%	38,544	53.94%	-5,629	-7.88%	71,459
Calaveras	7,567	35.98%	13,464	64.02%	-5,897	-28.04%	21,031
Colusa	1,782	32.67%	3,672	67.33%	-1,890	-34.65%	5,454
Contra Costa	263,120	68.75%	119,598	31.25%	143,522	37.50%	382,718
Del Norte	3,362	40.87%	4,865	59.13%	-1,503	-18.27%	8,227
El Dorado	35,747	40.93%	51,599	59.07%	-15,852	-18.15%	87,346
Fresno	100,671	46.61%	115,302	53.39%	-14,631	-6.77%	215,973
Glenn	2,172	27.80%	5,641	72.20%	-3,469	-44.40%	7,813
Humboldt	30,216	63.87%	17,093	36.13%	13,123	27.74%	47,309
Imperial	17,060	57.82%	12,446	42.18%	4,614	15.64%	29,506
Inyo	3,419	46.54%	3,927	53.46%	-508	-6.92%	7,346
Kern	72,729	38.91%	114,173	61.09%	-41,444	-22.17%	186,902
Kings	9,922	37.23%	16,731	62.77%	-6,809	-25.55%	26,653
Lake	10,086	50.55%	9,866	49.45%	220	1.10%	19,952
Lassen	1,853	20.42%	7,221	79.58%	-5,368	-59.16%	9,074
Los Angeles	1,591,738	68.48%	732,569	31.52%	859,169	36.96%	2,324,307
Madera	13,841	37.82%	22,755	62.18%	-8,914	-24.36%	36,596
Marin	92,990	79.97%	23,292	20.03%	69,698	59.94%	116,282
Mariposa	3,028	38.94%	4,749	61.06%	-1,721	-22.13%	7,777
Mendocino	19,583	65.20%	10,451	34.80%	9,132	30.41%	30,034
Merced	26,191	47.98%	28,401	52.02%	-2,210	-4.05%	54,592
Modoc	811	24.17%	2,545	75.83%	-1,734	-51.67%	3,356
Mono	2,558	56.95%	1,934	43.05%	624	13.89%	4,492
Monterey	65,758	65.12%	35,220	34.88%	30,538	30.24%	100,978
Napa	32,394	65.69%	16,921	34.31%	15,473	31.38%	49,315
Nevada	27,596	54.95%	22,624	45.05%	4,972	9.90%	50,220
Orange	471,146	48.83%	493,747	51.17%	-22,601	-2.34%	964,893
Placer	75,519	42.18%	103,534	57.82%	-28,015	-15.65%	179,053
Plumas	3,344	39.12%	5,204	60.88%	-1,860	-21.76%	8,548
Riverside	286,206	48.70%	301,467	51.30%	-15,261	-2.60%	587,673
Sacramento	278,122	59.36%	190,405	40.64%	87,717	18.72%	468,527
San Benito	10,683	55.26%	8,648	44.74%	2,035	10.53%	19,331
San Bernardino	217,090	48.32%	232,206	51.68%	-15,116	-3.36%	449,296
San Diego	576,465	56.96%	435,652	43.04%	140,813	13.91%	1,012,117
San Francisco	247,726	84.14%	46,696	15.86%	201,030	68.28%	294,422
San Joaquin	88,495	50.39%	87,119	49.61%	1,376	0.78%	175,614
San Luis Obispo	62,299	52.85%	55,580	47.15%	6,719	5.70%	117,879
San Mateo	181,373	74.94%	60,652	25.06%	120,721	49.88%	242,025
Santa Barbara	80,461	60.52%	52,490	39.48%	27,971	21.04%	132,951
Santa Clara	373,754	70.20%	158,629	29.80%	215,125	40.41%	532,383
Santa Cruz	79,375	77.08%	23,603	22.92%	55,772	54.16%	102,978
Shasta	20,546	30.42%	46,987	69.58%	-26,441	-39.15%	67,533
Sierra	570	36.99%	971	63.01%	-401	-26.02%	1,541
Siskiyou	6,754	38.62%	10,736	61.38%	-3,982	-22.77%	17,490
Solano	79,021	61.10%	50,318	38.90%	28,703	22.19%	129,339
Sonoma	141,488	72.70%	53,125	27.30%	88,363	45.40%	194,613
Stanislaus	57,402	44.29%	72,195	55.71%	-14,793	-11.41%	129,597
Sutter	9,591	34.72%	18,032	65.28%	-8,441	-30.56%	27,623
Tehama	5,650	27.65%	14,784	72.35%	-9,134	-44.70%	20,434
Trinity	2,011	44.78%	2,480	55.22%	-469	-10.44%	4,491
Tulare	34,621	38.27%	55,842	61.73%	-21,221	-23.46%	90,463
Tuolumne	8,842	38.61%	14,060	61.39%	-5,218	-22.78%	22,902
Ventura	153,074	55.29%	123,786	44.71%	29,288	10.58%	276,860
Yolo	45,180	68.00%	21,262	32.00%	23,918	36.00%	66,442
Yuba	6,883	35.43%	12,544	64.57%	-5,661	-29.14%	19,427
Totals	6,462,164	60.05%	4,298,530	39.95%	2,163,634	20.11%	10,760,694

Counties that flipped from Democratic to Republican

- Butte (largest municipality: Chico)
- Fresno (largest municipality: Fresno)
- Merced (largest municipality: Merced)
- Orange (largest municipality: Anaheim)
- Riverside (largest municipality: Riverside)
- San Bernardino (largest municipality: San Bernardino)
- Stanislaus (largest municipality: Modesto)

==== By congressional district ====
Weber won 39 of 52 congressional districts, including one that elected a Republican, with the remaining 13 going to Bernosky, including two that elected Democrats.

District	Weber	Bernosky	Representative
1st	36%	64%	Doug LaMalfa
2nd	72%	28%	Jared Huffman
3rd	45%	55%	Kevin Kiley
4th	65%	35%	Mike Thompson
5th	39%	61%	Tom McClintock
6th	56%	44%	Ami Bera
7th	66%	34%	Doris Matsui
8th	75%	25%	John Garamendi
9th	49.7%	50.3%	Josh Harder
10th	65%	35%	Mark DeSaulnier
11th	85%	15%	Nancy Pelosi
12th	90%	10%	Barbara Lee
13th	48%	52%	John Duarte
14th	69%	31%	Eric Swalwell
15th	75%	25%	Jackie Speier (117th Congress)
15th	75%	25%	Kevin Mullin (118th Congress)
16th	73%	27%	Anna Eshoo
17th	70%	30%	Ro Khanna
18th	66%	34%	Zoe Lofgren
19th	66%	34%	Jimmy Panetta
20th	32%	68%	Kevin McCarthy
21st	53%	47%	Jim Costa
22nd	50.3%	49.7%	David Valadao
23rd	40%	60%	Jay Obernolte
24th	60%	40%	Salud Carbajal
25th	54%	46%	Raul Ruiz
26th	54%	46%	Julia Brownley
27th	49.97%	50.03%	Mike Garcia
28th	63%	37%	Judy Chu
29th	73%	27%	Tony Cárdenas
30th	76%	24%	Adam Schiff
31st	59%	41%	Grace Napolitano
32nd	67%	33%	Brad Sherman
33rd	56%	44%	Pete Aguilar
34th	82%	18%	Jimmy Gomez
35th	56%	44%	Norma Torres
36th	68%	32%	Ted Lieu
37th	86%	14%	Karen Bass (117th Congress)
37th	86%	14%	Sydney Kamlager-Dove (118th Congress)
38th	58%	42%	Linda Sánchez
39th	56%	44%	Mark Takano
40th	45%	55%	Young Kim
41st	46%	54%	Ken Calvert
42nd	67%	33%	Lucille Roybal-Allard (117th Congress)
42nd	67%	33%	Robert Garcia (118th Congress)
43rd	79%	21%	Maxine Waters
44th	70%	30%	Nanette Barragán
45th	49%	51%	Michelle Steel
46th	60%	40%	Lou Correa
47th	49.95%	50.05%	Katie Porter
48th	39%	61%	Darrell Issa
49th	51%	49%	Mike Levin
50th	62%	38%	Scott Peters
51st	61%	39%	Sara Jacobs
52nd	64%	36%	Juan Vargas
