= 2024 Alaska elections =

- November 5, 2024

Alaska state elections in 2024 were held on Tuesday, November 5, 2024. Primary elections were held on August 20, 2024.

== Federal offices ==
=== President of the United States ===
Donald Trump won Alaska's 3 electoral votes in the Electoral College.

2024 United States presidential election in Alaska
Party	Candidate			
Party	Candidate	Votes	%	±%
Republican	Donald Trump JD Vance	184,458	54.54%	+1.71%
Democratic	Kamala Harris Tim Walz	140,026	41.41%	-1.36%
Independent	Robert F. Kennedy Jr. (withdrawn) Nicole Shanahan (withdrawn)	5,670	1.68%	N/A
Libertarian	Chase Oliver Mike ter Maat	3,040	0.90%	-2.38%
Independent	Jill Stein Butch Ware	2,342	0.69%	N/A
Aurora	Cornel West Melina Abdullah	1,127	0.33%	N/A
Constitution	Randall Terry Stephen Broden	812	0.24%	-0.07%
American Solidarity	Peter Sonski Lauren Onak	702	0.21%	N/A
Total votes		338,177	100.00%	

=== United States House of Representatives ===
Incumbent Democratic representative Mary Peltola lost reelection to Nick Begich III after first being elected in the 2022 special election.

2024 Alaska's at-large congressional district election
Party	Candidate	First choice		Round 1			Round 2			Round 3	
Party	Candidate	Votes	%	Votes	%	Transfer	Votes	%	Transfer	Votes	%
Republican	Nick Begich III	159,550	48.41%	159,777	48.49%	+267	160,044	48.77%	+4,817	164,861	51.22%
Democratic	Mary Peltola (incumbent)	152,828	46.37%	152,948	46.42%	+1,313	154,261	47.01%	+2,724	156,985	48.78%
Independence	John Wayne Howe	13,010	3.95%	13,210	4.01%	+661	13,871	4.23%	-13,871	Eliminated	
Democratic	Eric Hafner	3,417	1.04%	3,558	1.08%	-3,558	Eliminated				
Write-in		750	0.23%	Eliminated							
Total votes		329,555		329,493			328,176			321,846	
Inactive ballots (Note: Includes overvotes, undervotes, and exhausted ballots where another candidate was not ranked.)				6,360		+1,317	7,677		+6,330	14,007	
Republican gain from Democratic											

== State offices ==
=== State judiciary ===
Judges and justices are appointed by the governor and must be approved by voters at the first statewide general election held more than three years after their appointment, and then every 10 years afterwards. All members of the judiciary were approved by voters in the election.

==== State Supreme Court ====
On the Alaska Supreme Court, Governor Mike Dunleavy appointed justices Dario Borghesan (in 2020) and Jennifer S. Henderson (in 2021) appeared on the ballot and were approved by voters. Both thus have an initial term of 10 years, expiring in 2034.

===== Justice Borghesan retention =====
Results by state house district Yes: 50–60%; 60–70%; 70–80%; No: 50–60%

Justice Borghesan retention, 2024
Choice	Votes	%
For	159,319	60.61
Against	103,541	39.39
Total	262,860	100.00
Source: Alaska Division of Elections

===== Justice Henderson retention =====
Results by state house district Yes: 50–60%; 60–70%; 70–80%; No: 50–60%

Justice Henderson retention, 2024
Choice	Votes	%
For	156,819	60.14
Against	103,919	39.86
Total	260,738	100.00
Source: Alaska Division of Elections

==== Appellate Court ====
On the Alaska Court of Appeals, incumbent judge Marjorie Allard was approved by voters to serve another 10-year term, while Timothy Terrell was approved by voters after being appointed in 2020 by governor Mike Dunleavy.

===== Judge Allard retention =====
Results by state house district Yes: 50–60%; 60–70%; 70–80%; No: 50–60%

Judge Allard retention, 2024
Choice	Votes	%
For	159,078	61.25
Against	100,662	38.75
Total	259,740	100.00
Source: Alaska Division of Elections

===== Judge Terrell retention =====
Results by state house district Yes: 50–60%; 60–70%; 70–80%; No: 50–60%

Judge Terrell retention, 2024
Choice	Votes	%
For	148,897	58.02
Against	107,751	41.98
Total	256,648	100.00
Source: Alaska Division of Elections

==== Local courts ====
Anchorage Superior Court Judge Adolf Zeman, described as the "only [judge] with a campaign against him" due to a controversial decision which found state payments to families of homeschooled students unconstitutional.

=== State legislature ===
All 40 seats of the Alaska House of Representatives and 10 of 20 seats of the Alaska State Senate were up for election.

==== State senate ====
The bipartisan majority caucus retained its majority, albeit with two seats with majority-caucus affiliated Republicans flipping to independent Republicans.

Party	Leader	Before	After	Change
Coalition	Gary Stevens	17 (Note: Consists of 9 Democrats and 8 Republicans.)	14 (Note: Consists of 9 Democrats and 5 Republicans.)	▼3
Republican	Shelley Hughes	3	6	▲3
Total		20	20	

==== House of Representatives ====
The Democratic-led bipartisan coalition achieved a majority of seats.

Party	Leader	Before	After	Change
Democratic-led Coalition	Calvin Schrage	16 (Note: 1 Republican caucused with 11 Democrats and 4 Independents to form a minority coalition caucus.)	21 (Note: 2 Republicans caucus with 14 Democrats and 5 Independents to form a new majority coalition caucus.)	▲5
Republican-led Coalition	Cathy Tilton	23 (Note: 2 Democrats caucused with 20 Republicans and 1 Independent to form a majority coalition caucus.)	19 (Note: 19 Republicans remained in the minority caucus.)	▼4
Independent Republican	David Eastman	1	0	▼1
Total		40	40	

== Ballot measure ==
=== Measure 1 ===
Results by state house district Yes: 50–60%; 60–70%; 70–80%; No: 50–60%; 60–70%

A ballot measure was approved by voters which would increase the state's minimum wage to $15 an hour by 2027 and expand sick paid leave. The minimum wage in Alaska at the time of the election was $11.73 an hour, an inflation-adjusted amount of the $9.75 an hour minimum wage enacted after the passage of the 2014 Ballot Measure 3.

Alaska Measure 1
Choice	Votes	%
For	183,744	57.98
Against	133,162	42.02
Total	316,906	100.00

=== Measure 2 ===
A ballot measure was narrowly rejected by voters which would have returned the state to its traditional first-past-the-post voting system, reversing the 2020 Ballot Measure 2 which created the ranked choice, multi-round voting system that governed the 2022 and 2024 elections.

Alaska Measure 2
Choice	Votes	%
For	160,230	49.88
Against	160,973	50.12
Total	321,203	100.00

== See also ==
- Bilingual elections requirement for Alaska (per Voting Rights Act Amendments of 2006)
