= Peter Sonski 2024 presidential campaign =

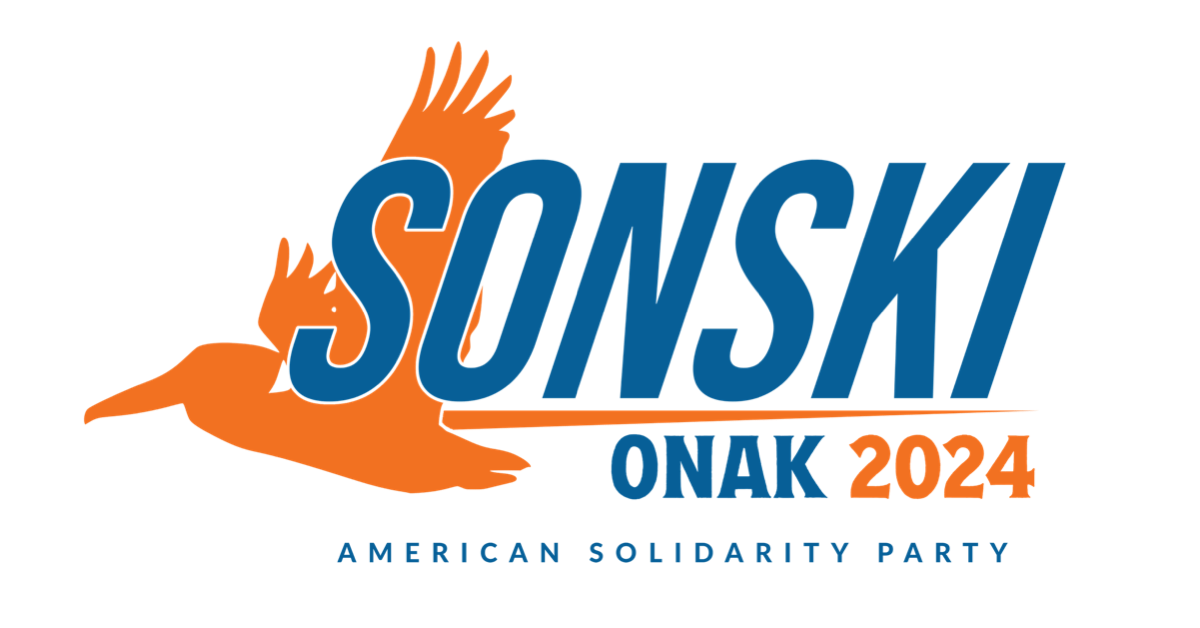
- Campaign: 2024 United States presidential election
- Candidate: Peter Sonski; Lauren Onak
- Affiliation: American Solidarity Party
- Status: Official nominee: June 2, 2023

Website
- https://www.petersonski.com

The American Solidarity Party candidate for the 2024 U.S. presidential election was Peter Sonski, a former radio host, journalist and Marine. Sonski won the ASP primary and party nomination for President of the United States on June 3, 2023. The primary was conducted by an online member vote. Vice-presidential nominee Lauren Onak was selected by Sonski before she was formally nominated at the national convention in early July in Plano, Texas. The party was on the ballot in Arkansas, Alaska, Florida, Ohio, Hawaii, Louisiana and Mississippi, and was a registered write-in option in 36 other states.

== Background ==
The American Solidarity Party, founded in 2011, first contested a presidential campaign in 2016; it obtained ballot access in one state, and received 6,697 votes. In 2020, the party was on the ballot on eight states and received 42,305 votes. It was announced on June 2, 2023, that Sonski had won the ASP online primary for the 2024 election. All ASP members could vote in the primary, which was held from May 24 to June 1. Sonski was nominated in the first round of ranked-choice voting with 52 percent of the vote. He then selected Lauren Onak as his vice president, who was nominated by unanimous consent of the delegates at the national convention.

2024 ASP presidential nomination
Candidate	Votes	Percentage			
Candidate	Votes	Percentage	Peter Sonski	328	52.5%
Jacqueline Abernathy	207	33.1			
Joe Schriner	50	8.0			
Larry Johnson	24	3.8			
Erskine Levi	16	2.6			
Total:	625	100.00%			

== Candidacy ==
Peter Sonski (born July 11, 1962) is an American former radio host who was an elected member of Connecticut's Regional School District 17 Board of Education and director of the Knights of Columbus Museum.

== Campaign ==
In December 2023, Dwight Longenecker published an interview on The Stream in which Sonski explained that "third parties provide thoughtful alternatives and allow other voices to be heard, and this is important in a democratic system." In a Catholic News Agency interview the following month, he said that he wants to "provide a means for Catholics to vote in accord with the conscience, rather than just for the 'lesser of two evils.'" Crisis Magazine published an interview by Longenecker saying that Sonski "was born into a blue-collar Catholic family and went on to work in agriculture, insurance, journalism, and public relations."

In April 2024, Christianity Today reported that evangelicals disaffected with the two major parties wanted a third. Two months later, the Ethics & Religious Liberty Commission of the Southern Baptist Convention was the first major Protestant organization to give the candidates coverage with a four-part series examining parties in the election.

In July 2024, soon after the Republican National Convention which reportedly softened the party's stance on abortion, National Review characterized the Solidarity Party as the only anti-abortion party. Aleteia published an interview with Sonski in which he described the American Solidarity Party as "predominantly centrist – a little right on social issues, a little left on fiscal issues."

The following month, an American Reformer article acknowledging that evangelicals critical of Donald Trump were "flocking to the American Solidarity party" assessed the campaign and urged evangelicals to think twice before voting for Sonski; the "stakes are too high too high and the country on the brink", and "at the presidential level votes should not be wasted on quixotic schemes". New Jersey Republicans launched a successful legal challenge against Sonski's position on the New Jersey ballot, saying that some of his ballot-access signatures were invalid. Sonski did not appear on the ballot in that state. The Gospel Coalition, an evangelical group, published an article comparing the Democratic, Republican, Solidarity, and Constitution Parties' stances on key social issues. The Pillar, a Catholic news agency, profiled the campaign and interviewed Sonski. In September, a National Catholic Register article noted how difficult it was for the Sonski campaign to obtain ballot access for the election.

== Ballot access ==
American Solidarity Party ballot access during the 2024 presidential election Certified for ballot Registered write-in Automatic write-in Not on ballot

As of Sept 17, 2024:

	Total possible	2024	2020	2016
States & DC (inc. write-in)	51	7 (45)	8 (39)	1 (26)
Electoral votes (inc. write-in)	538	74 (480)	66 (397)	9 (323)
Percent of EVs (inc. write-in)	100%	13.8% (89.2%)	12.3% (73.8%)	1.7% (60%)
Alabama	9	write-in	write-in	write-in
Alaska	3	On ballot	write-in	write-in
Arizona	11	write-in	Not on ballot	Not on ballot
Arkansas	6	On ballot	On ballot	Not on ballot
California	55	write-in	write-in	write-in
Colorado	9	write-in	On ballot	On ballot
Connecticut	7	write-in	write-in	Not on ballot
Delaware	3	write-in	write-in	Not on ballot
Florida	29	On ballot	write-in	Not on ballot
Georgia	16	write-in	write-in	write-in
Hawaii	4	On ballot	Not on ballot	Not on ballot
Idaho	4	write-in	write-in	write-in
Illinois	20	write-in	On ballot	Not on ballot
Indiana	11	write-in	write-in	Not on ballot
Iowa	6	write-in	write-in	write-in
Kansas	6	write-in	write-in	write-in
Kentucky	8	write-in	write-in	write-in
Louisiana	8	On ballot	On ballot	Not on ballot
Maine	4	write-in	Not on ballot	Not on ballot
Maryland	10	write-in	write-in	write-in
Massachusetts	11	write-in	write-in	Not on ballot
Michigan	16	write-in	write-in	write-in
Minnesota	10	write-in	write-in	write-in
Mississippi	6	On ballot	On ballot	Not on ballot
Missouri	10	write-in	write-in	Not on ballot
Montana	3	write-in	Not on ballot	Not on ballot
Nebraska	5	Write-in	write-in	write-in
Nevada	6	Not on ballot	Not on ballot	Not on ballot
New Hampshire	4	write-in	write-in	write-in
New Jersey	14	write-in	write-in	write-in
New Mexico	5	Not on ballot	Not on ballot	Not on ballot
New York	29	write-in	write-in	write-in
North Carolina	15	write-in	Not on ballot	Not on ballot
North Dakota	3	write-in	write-in	write-in
Ohio	18	On ballot	write-in	write-in
Oklahoma	7	Not on ballot	Not on ballot	Not on ballot
Oregon	7	write-in	write-in	write-in
Pennsylvania	20	write-in	write-in	write-in
Rhode Island	4	write-in	On ballot	write-in
South Carolina	9	Not on ballot	Not on ballot	Not on ballot
South Dakota	3	Not on ballot	Not on ballot	Not on ballot
Tennessee	11	write-in	write-in	Not on ballot
Texas	38	write-in	write-in	write-in
Utah	6	write-in	write-in	Not on ballot
Vermont	3	write-in	On ballot	write-in
Virginia	13	write-in	write-in	write-in
Washington	12	write-in	write-in	write-in
West Virginia	5	write-in	Not on ballot	Not on ballot
Wisconsin	10	write-in	On ballot	write-in
Wyoming	3	write-in	write-in	Not on ballot
District of Columbia	3	TBD	Not on ballot	Not on ballot

== Results ==
Sonski received 47,070 votes for president, 0.03 percent of the total votes cast. He did best in states where he was on the ballot, and Ohio was his best state.

== Political positions ==
As a proponent of Christian democracy, Sonski supports a consistent life ethic and opposes abortion, capital punishment, and euthanasia. He supports social-justice initiatives. Sonski opposes the legalization of same-sex marriage and believes that gay couples should not have the same adoption rights as heterosexual couples. He has endorsed Robert P. George's initiative to celebrate June as Fidelity Month, and believes that the U.S. should continue to support Ukraine.
