= Valley Voice =

Defunct Vermont newspaper

- Type: Weekly newspaper
- Format: Broadsheet
- Owner: Felicia D. Roberts
- Founded: 1974
- Ceased publication: 2018
- Headquarters: Middlebury, VT
- Circulation: 30,000 (updated on 08/22/2017)
- ISSN: 0192-6810
- OCLC number: 05085989

The Valley Voice was a weekly Vermont newspaper based out of Middlebury, VT and was published on Tuesdays from 1974 to 2018. With a circulation of 12,450 the Valley Voice provided local news for the towns of Addison County. The paper was founded in 1974 by John and Betty White when they relocated from New York to Vermont. The first editor of the paper was David Moats.

== History ==
By 1981 circulation was lagging and John White announced that he was looking for an investor which would allow the paper to expand into the towns of Charlotte and Shelburne to the north.

In 1987 the Whites sold the Valley Voice to Denton Publications a publisher based in Elizabethtown, NY. By the mid-1980s the circulation of the Valley Voice had fallen to 3500 from a high of 17,000 in the mid-1970s. In 2002, under the direction of owner Cheryl White, the paper reported the highest weekly circulation of the three Middlebury based papers at 12,000 (Addison County Independent, Addison Eagle, and Valley Voice).

Cheryl White was the owner and publisher of the paper from 1987 until her death in May 2018.

== Recognition ==
In 2013 the Vermont House adopted a resolution to honor the Valley Voice and owner/publisher Cheryl White for outstanding community service.
