= Mike Maturen =

American politician

- Born: September 9, 1964 (age 61); Saginaw, Michigan, U.S.
- Citizenship: United States
- Occupations: Salesperson and part-time magician
- Known for: Candidacy in the 2016 American presidential election
- Political party: American Solidarity

Michael A. Maturen (/məˈtʌrən/; born September 9, 1964) is an American political activist best known for his candidacy for president of the United States as the nominee of the American Solidarity Party in the 2016 United States presidential election.

== Life and career ==
Maturen was born in Saginaw, Michigan in 1964 and was adopted into a Catholic family. He attended Douglas MacArthur High School, attended Central Michigan University where he earned a Bachelor of Science degree in psychology with a minor in journalism, and, in 2002, Maturen graduated from the Minnesota Graduate School of Theology.

That same year, Maturen was ordained as a priest in the Communion of Evangelical Episcopal Churches (an Evangelical church in the Anglican tradition—though outside of the Anglican Communion), although he eventually returned to the Catholic Church. As of 2016, Maturen worked as a salesperson and part-time magician. He has also served as the District Deputy for the Michigan Jurisdiction of the Knights of Columbus.

In 2012, he wrote and published a weekly devotional book entitled A New Dawn: Weekly Wisdom From Everyday Life.

== Presidential campaign and political positions ==
Ballot status in the fifty states and D.C. Ballot access Write-in access Not on ballot

Maturen was the presidential nominee for the American Solidarity Party. Maturen is opposed to abortion and capital punishment. He refers to himself as "WHOLE life...not just anti-abortion". He supports the Christian democratic concepts of solidarity and subsidiarity.

=== Ballot status ===
Electoral votes: 9 (332 with write-ins)

Ballot access: Colorado

Write-in access: Alabama, Alaska, California, Georgia, Idaho, Iowa, Kansas, Kentucky, Maryland, Michigan, Minnesota, Nebraska, New Hampshire, New Jersey, New York, North Dakota, Ohio, Oregon, Pennsylvania, Rhode Island, Texas, Vermont, Virginia, Washington, Wisconsin

=== Endorsements ===
- Peter Lawler, Roman Catholic political scientist
- Mark P. Shea, Roman Catholic apologist
