= George Yancey =

American professor of sociology

George Alan Yancey (born September 8, 1962) is an American professor of sociology at Baylor University, where he has taught since 2019. He is known for his research on anti-Christian attitudes in the contemporary United States, and the ways in which it can influence the decisions made by academic sociologists. He has been called "the only researcher studying Christianophobia at a secular university".

Yancey is a supporter of the American Solidarity Party.
