= Administrative divisions of Alaska =

The administrative divisions of Alaska are the various units of government that provide local government services in the state of Alaska.

== Boroughs ==
Section 3 of Article X of the Constitution of Alaska divides the state, at the first level, into organized and unorganized boroughs. These boroughs are functionally equivalent to counties found in most other states.

Areas of Alaska which are not within the boundaries of an organized borough are, by default, part of a single unorganized borough. However, beginning with the 1970 census, the United States Census Bureau, in cooperation with the state, divided this borough into multiple named census areas in order to facilitate the taking of the United States Census.

== Cities ==
Section 7 of Article X of the Constitution of Alaska divides the state, at the second level, into incorporated cities, which must be located entirely within the boundaries of a single borough.

== Classification of municipalities ==
Municipalities in Alaska are divided into two groups: home rule municipalities and general law municipalities. Home rule municipalities are chartered and have all legislative powers not otherwise prohibited to them. General law municipalities, on the other hand, are not chartered and have only those legislative powers explicitly given to them.

General law municipalities are divided into five classes: first-, second-, and third-class boroughs, and first- and second-class cities. Each class has specific requirements for existence and potential incorporation or reclassification.

The organization, incorporation, merger, consolidation, reclassification, and dissolution of municipalities is overseen by the Local Boundary Commission.
