= Dario Borghesan =

American judge (born 1979)

Associate Justice of the Alaska Supreme Court
- Incumbent
- Assumed office July 1, 2020
- Appointed by: Mike Dunleavy
- Preceded by: Craig Stowers

Personal details
- Born: December 11, 1979 (age 46) Springfield, MA, U.S.
- Education: Amherst College (BA); University of Michigan (JD)

Dario Borghesan (born December 11, 1979) is an American lawyer from Alaska who is an associate justice of the Alaska Supreme Court.

== Early life and education ==
Borghesan was born in Springfield, Massachusetts in 1979. He studied political science at Amherst College, graduating in 2002 with a Bachelor of Arts magna cum laude. He was a Peace Corps volunteer in Togo from 2002 to 2004. He attended the University of Michigan Law School, graduating in 2008 with a Juris Doctor magna cum laude and Order of the Coif honors.

== Career ==
Borghesan served as a law clerk to Justice Daniel Winfree of the Alaska Supreme Court from 2008 to 2009. He then joined the Alaska Department of Law, where he worked in various roles from 2009 to 2020, including as the supervising attorney of the department's civil appeals section.

=== Alaska Supreme Court ===
Borghesan was one of eight candidates who applied to fill a vacancy on the Alaska Supreme Court caused by Justice Craig Stowers’ retirement. The Alaska Judicial Council submitted his name, along with those of three other candidates, to Governor Mike Dunleavy. On July 1, 2020, Dunleavy announced his appointment of Borghesan.

Legal offices
Preceded by Craig Stowers	Associate Justice of the Alaska Supreme Court; 2020–present	Incumbent
