= Stephen Bainbridge =

American journalist

- Born: 1958 (age 67–68); Doylestown, Pennsylvania, U.S.
- Education: Western Maryland College (BA); University of Virginia (MS, JD)
- Occupations: William D. Warren Professor of Law, University of California, Los Angeles

Stephen Bainbridge (born 1958) is an American legal scholar. He is the William D. Warren Professor of Law at the University of California, Los Angeles, School of Law, where he teaches courses on corporations and business law.

== Education and career ==
Bainbridge graduated with an A.B. from Western Maryland College, 1980; a Master of Science in chemistry, University of Virginia, 1983; and a Juris Doctor from the University of Virginia School of Law, 1985. Bainbridge has been a law professor at UCLA since 1997.

Bainbridge has written numerous law review articles and books, with a strong emphasis on the law and economics of public corporations. He is a leading advocate of Director Primacy in corporate governance, and has written numerous law review articles on the subject.

In 2008, Bainbridge received the UCLA School of Law's Rutter Award for Excellence in Teaching. In 2008, Directorship Magazine named Bainbridge one of the 100 most influential people in the field of corporate governance.

Bainbridge had donated consistently to Republican political candidates including a donation of $2,700 (the maximum allowed by law) to Donald Trump, but in 2020 he donated to the American Solidarity Party as well. He has since joined the American Solidarity Party.

== Director primacy ==
Director primacy is a theory of the firm that was introduced by Bainbridge in an article in Northwestern University Law Review in 2003 (Vol 97 No 2). He argues that traditional firm theory is based on a false premise that the board's authority derives from the owners. He argues that while the board is appointed by the owners, the nature of the appointment is one in which the power to be exercised is not under the control of the appointing members. Once appointed then, directors are almost unfettered in their exercise of their powers. However, they are subject to overarching fiduciary responsibility which aligns their required actions with a shareholder wealth maximization principle.
