= Missionaries to the Preborn =

Wisconsin-based anti-abortion organization

Missionaries to the Preborn is an American anti-abortion advocacy group based in Milwaukee, Wisconsin. It was founded in 1990 by Rev. Matthew Trewhella. This organization, as visible in names and faces of their membership, is closely tied to the Faithful Soldier School of Evangelism, which is run by his son-in-law, Jason Storms.

In June 2005, the group held a nine-day campaign in Michigan, dubbed the "American Atrocity Tour". The group is known for displaying signs purporting to feature graphic photographs of aborted fetuses along roadsides, although these images are sometimes mislabeled.

Trewhella has served 14 months for blockading clinics. In 1994, he was a featured speaker at the U.S. Taxpayers Party convention. He has expressed non-condemnation of those involved in abortion-related violence, stating, "I don't condemn people who use force to try to protect babies, because they are human beings. And if someone uses force to try to protect those babies, it would be as if someone used force against Dr. Mengele, from Adolf Hitler's era. If someone used force against him, would I condemn the person for stopping Mengele from all the atrocities he did? No, I wouldn't condemn that person". However, he tempered these remarks by noting that he does not advocate violence.

Trewhella currently hosts a weekly television program in Milwaukee, called "In Focus."
