= Joe Schriner =

American perennial candidate, political activist, and journalist

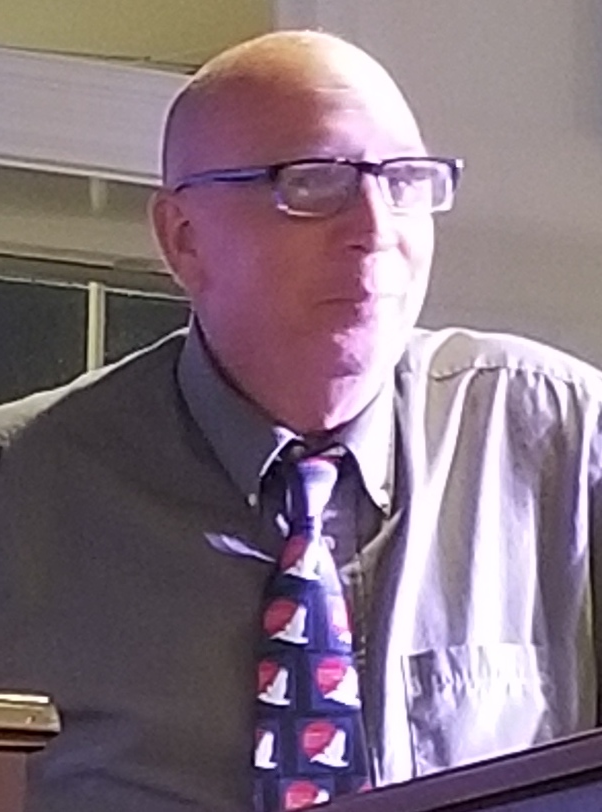
- Schriner participating in a presidential debate for the nomination of the American Solidarity Party in 2019
- Born: Joseph Charles Shriner; March 3, 1955 (age 71); Cleveland, Ohio, U.S.
- Years active: 2000-Current
- Known for: United States presidential campaigns Christian democracy
- Political party: American Solidarity Party (2019–); Independent (before 2019)

Joseph Charles Schriner (born March 3, 1955) is an American political activist and journalist. Schriner has run for the United States presidency in six consecutive election cycles spanning from 2000 to 2020. Advocating Christian democratic policies, he has primarily run as an independent candidate, until the 2020 presidential election when he sought the American Solidarity Party nomination instead. Schriner's political views largely revolve around Catholic Social Teaching. He also ran as a Republican during the early portions of the 2000 and 2016 presidential election cycles. He also vied unsuccessfully for the Green Party presidential nomination during the 2008 election cycle.

Schriner has been referred to as "average Joe" in the media. He is also sometimes referred to as "Joe the Painter." He is currently self-employed as a house painter.

== Early life and education ==
Joe Schriner was born on March 3, 1955, in Cleveland, Ohio. In 1973, he graduated from Bay Village High School, where he was the starting quarterback on the junior varsity football team.

Schriner spent his freshman year at Bluffton College in Ohio. After taking a year off from school to work, he transferred to Bowling Green State University. He majored in journalism, wrote for BG News, and completed an internship as a reporter on Ohio's Troy Daily News. Schriner earned a Bachelor of Arts in journalism from Bowling Green State University in 1978.

== Early career ==
Schriner began his career as a journalist after college for the Sandusky Register. Schriner left the Register after two years.

In 1983, Schriner began working at a halfway house in Lorain as a drug and alcoholism counselor. The halfway house was a 90-day treatment program run operated by the Lorain County Council on Alcoholism and Drug Abuse (LCCADA). During the next two years, Schriner pursued seminar studies to become a drug and alcoholism counselor.

== Presidential campaigns ==
=== 2000 to 2012 ===
Schriner declared his first run for U.S. President with a speech at the Liberty Bell in Philadelphia, Pennsylvania, on April 30, 1999. He initially declared as a Republican candidate, but then switched to independent after George W. Bush won the Republican Primaries. Schriner ran again in 2004, 2008, and 2012.

Schriner declared his 2016 candidacy in a podcast on the home page of his official campaign website. 2016 marked his fifth consecutive run for president.

=== 2020 ===
Schriner announced he would run in the 2020 United States presidential election as an American Solidarity Party candidate. He lost the nomination to Brian T. Carroll. He continued to run as an independent.

=== 2024 ===
Schriner sought the nomination of the American Solidarity Party for a second time Peter Sonski would defeat him In the primary

== Personal life ==
Schriner resides in Bluffton, OH. He and his wife Liz have three children. Schriner met his wife, a native of New Zealand, in Homer, Alaska. He is Catholic.

== Books ==
- America's Best Town (ISBN 1932303243 ISBN 978-1-932303-24-7)
- America's Best Town 2 (ISBN 159526129X ISBN 978-1-59526-129-8)
- Back Road to the White House (ISBN 1595262776 ISBN 978-1-59526-129-8)
