= American Solidarity Party =

American political party

- Leader: Marcos Lopez
- Chairperson: Jack Ternan
- Founder: David "Frost" Harris; Kirk Morrison; Jack Quirk
- Founded: 2011; 15 years ago; 2016; 10 years ago
- Youth wing: Young Americans for Solidarity
- Ideology: Christian democracy; Distributism; Economic progressivism; Social conservatism (US)
- Political position: Fiscal: Center-left; Social: Center-right
- Religion: Christianity
- Colors: Orange
- Slogan: "Pro Life, Pro Family, Pro Worker"

Federal government
- Senate: 0 / 100 (0%)
- House: 0 / 435 (0%)

State government
- Governorships: 0 / 50 (0%)
- Upper house seats: 0 / 1,972 (0%)
- Lower house seats: 0 / 5,411 (0%)

Other offices
- Other elected officials: 3

Website
- www.solidarity-party.org

The American Solidarity Party (ASP), formerly the Christian Democratic Party USA (CDPUSA), is an American syncretic political party founded in 2011 by David "Frost" Harris, Kirk Morrison, and Jack Quirk. It is a Christian democratic political party with center-left economic values and center-right social values. The party has a Solidarity National Committee (SNC) and has numerous active state and local chapters.

The American Solidarity Party has been characterized as socially conservative and economically progressive. The ASP encourages social development along the lines of subsidiarity and sphere sovereignty, with a stated emphasis on "the importance of strong nuclear families, local communities, and voluntary associations". The party adheres to a consistent life ethic, opposing abortion, assisted suicide, capital punishment, euthanasia, and unjust war. They broadly support universal healthcare, immigration, and welfare. It favors fiscally progressive policies, as well as a social market economy with a distributist character, which seeks "widespread economic participation and ownership", and providing a social safety net program.

In the 2024 United States presidential election, it was on the ballot in Alaska, Arkansas, Florida, Hawaii, Louisiana, Mississippi, and Ohio, with Peter Sonski as the party's nominee.

== History ==
The American Solidarity party was founded in 2011 as the Christian Democratic Party USA (CDPUSA) by founders David "Frost" Harris, Kirk Morrison, and Jack Quirk. The party's original name was inspired by its European counterparts, the Polish trade union known as Solidarity, and the current one reflects its more developed ideology and focus in the years since. The ASP mascot is the pelican, a traditional symbol of charity.

In 2012, the CDPUSA endorsed the independent candidacy of Joe Schriner for president.

In December 2020, the American Solidarity Party joined the board of the Coalition for Free and Open Elections (COFOE).

== Ideology ==
The American Solidarity Party largely adheres to the ideology of Christian democracy, which has been influenced by Catholic social teaching, Neo-Calvinist theology and the social teachings espoused by other traditions of Christianity in various parts of the world. As such, the ASP looks to the Christian democratic movements in Europe and the Americas.

The American Solidarity Party has been characterized as conservative on social issues while progressive on economic issues, making it communitarian.

=== Social issues ===
The American Solidarity Party opposes abortion, euthanasia, and capital punishment on the basis of the sanctity of human life. It views the nuclear family as being central to society, supporting ending same sex marriage, the repeal of no-fault divorce, and direct cash payments to families proportional to the number of children they have.

The American Solidarity Party advocates for a sympathetic approach to immigration. They believe in balancing the need for secure borders with a commitment to human dignity. This involves addressing the root causes of migration, such as the impact of the country's military, political, and economic power abroad.

=== Economic issues ===
The American Solidarity Party supports a universal healthcare system as well as an economy containing widespread distribution of productive property, in particular increased worker ownership and management of their production. The party is also supports economic interventionism.

=== Foreign policy issues ===
The American Solidarity Party is non-interventionist in its foreign policy, using peace as its guiding principle. It supports foreign aid and nonviolent diplomacy, while opposing violent military action as a means to resolve conflicts.

=== Electoral reform ===
The American Solidarity Party advocates for electoral reform, aiming to combat what they call a "political oligarchy" and gridlock. They propose proportional representation for the House of Representatives, endorse ranked-choice voting or approval voting in all elections, and support easy voter registration. The party also emphasizes fair access for independent candidates, access to impartial information, and pilot programs for electronic voting with consideration for security concerns.

== Influences ==
Daniel Silliman writes that the American Solidarity Party, as with other Christian-democratic political parties, draws from Catholic social teaching and Neo-Calvinist theology. In the same vein, David McPherson says that the American Solidarity Party "affirm[s] ... the full spectrum of Catholic social teaching (namely, the teachings regarding the sanctity of human life, the common good, subsidiarity, religious freedom, solidarity, etc.)," contrasting the ASP to both the Republican Party and the Democratic Party, each of which recognizes only some of these items. Its strongest support is in California and Texas, according to the Madera Tribune (of Madera, California).

Members of the American Solidarity Party use the demonym "Solidarist" to refer to themselves.

== Elections ==
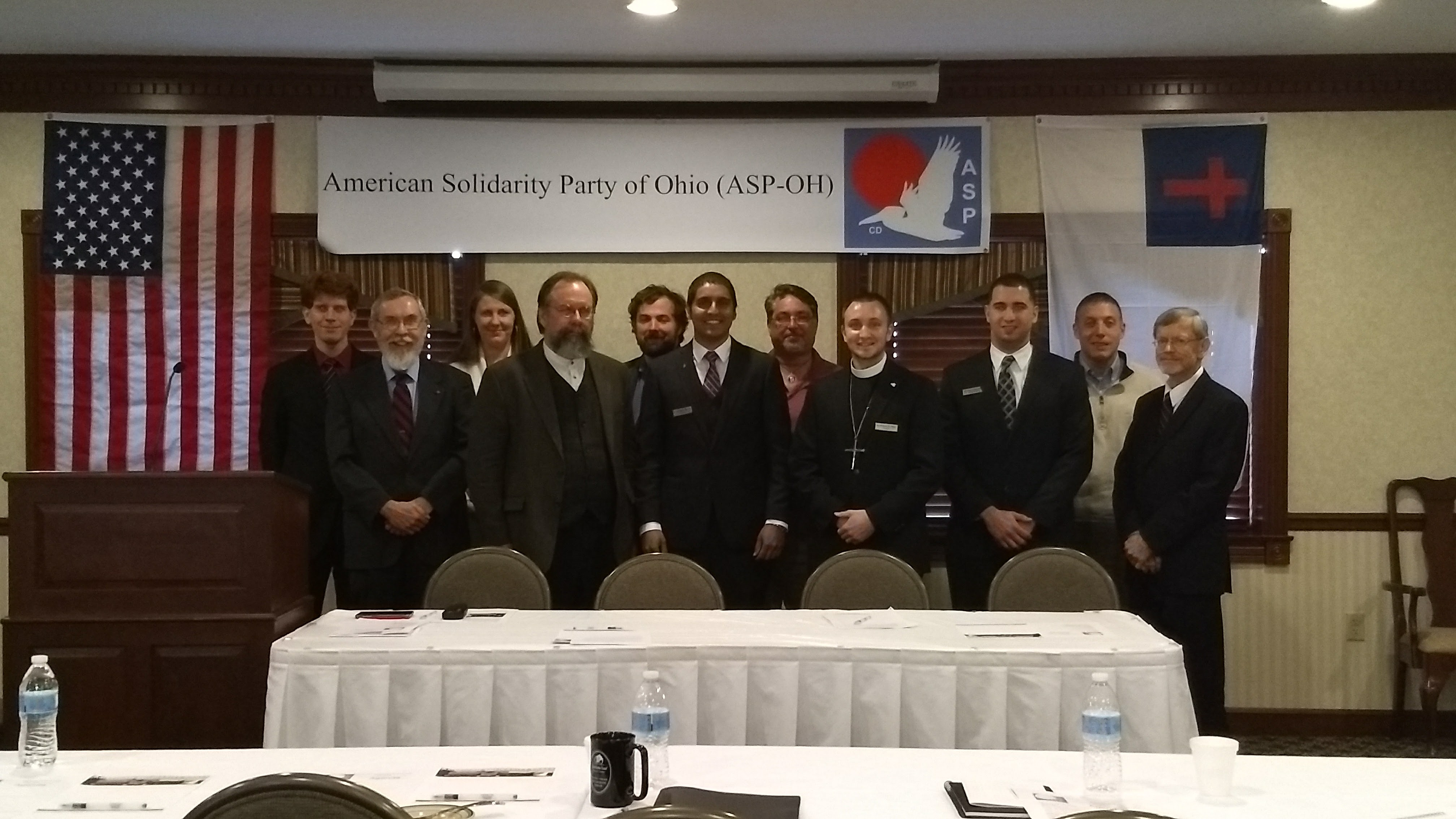
Members gathered for the 2017 ASP Midwestern Regional Meeting

The ASP has run candidates for federal, state, and local offices. There are currently three ASP members serving in elected office. All three are local offices.

=== Presidential elections ===
==== 2016 ====
During the 2016 presidential election season, the American Solidarity Party held an online convention on July 9, 2016, which nominated Amir Azarvan of Georgia for president and Mike Maturen of Michigan for vice-president. However, Azarvan subsequently withdrew, and in response the ticket was revised, with Maturen running for president and Juan Muñoz of Texas running for vice-president.

For the 2016 election, the American Solidarity Party was listed on the ballot in Colorado. It was a certified write-in option in Alabama, California, Georgia, Iowa, Kansas, Kentucky, Maryland, Michigan, Minnesota, New Hampshire, New Jersey, Ohio, Oregon, Pennsylvania, Rhode Island, Texas, Vermont, and Washington. Maturen received 6,697 votes in Colorado.

==== 2020 ====
In the 2020 U.S. presidential election, Brian Carroll, Joe Schriner, and Joshua Perkins announced their candidacies for the ASP nomination. Carroll was declared the winner of the nomination on September 9, 2019.

For the 2020 election, the American Solidarity Party was on the ballot in Arkansas, Colorado, Guam, Illinois, Louisiana, Mississippi, Rhode Island, Vermont and Wisconsin.

It was a certified write-in option in Alabama, Alaska, California, Connecticut, Delaware, Florida, Georgia, Idaho, Indiana, Iowa, Kansas, Kentucky, Maryland, Massachusetts, Michigan, Minnesota, Missouri, Nebraska, New Hampshire, New Jersey, New York, North Dakota, Ohio, Oregon, Pennsylvania, Tennessee, Texas, Utah, Virginia, Washington, and Wyoming.

==== 2024 ====
On June 2, 2023, Peter Sonski won the nomination of the party for President of the United States. The primary was conducted by an online members' vote. The vice presidential nominee, Lauren Onak, was selected by Sonski before the national convention in early July in Plano, Texas, and she was formally nominated there. The party was on the ballot in Arkansas, Alaska, Hawaii, Florida, Louisiana, Mississippi, and Ohio. Additionally, the American Solidarity Party had approved write-in status in Arizona, California, Colorado, Connecticut, Delaware, Georgia, Idaho, Illinois, Indiana, Iowa, Kansas, Kentucky, Maine, Maryland, Massachusetts, Michigan, Minnesota, Missouri, Nebraska, New Hampshire, New Jersey, New York, North Dakota, Oregon, Pennsylvania, Rhode Island, Tennessee, Texas, Utah, Vermont, Washington, West Virginia, Wisconsin, and Wyoming.

| Year | Presidential candidate | Vice presidential candidate | Popular votes | % | Electoral votes | Result | Ballot access | Notes | Ref. |
|---|---|---|---|---|---|---|---|---|---|
| 2024 | Peter Sonski | Lauren Onak | 47,070 (#8) | 0.03% | 0 | Lost | 74 / 538 | Sonski had write-in access in 33 additional states. | |
| 2020 | Brian Carroll | Amar Patel | 40,365 (#10) | 0.03% | 0 | Lost | 66 / 538 | Carroll had write-in access in 31 additional states. | |
| 2016 | Mike Maturen | Juan Muñoz | 6,697 (#15) | 0.01% | 0 | Lost | 10 / 538 | Maturen had write-in access in 18 additional states. | |

=== United States Senate elections ===
| Year | Candidate | State | Votes | % | Result | Notes | Ref. |
|---|---|---|---|---|---|---|---|
| 2024 | Mark Ruzon | California | 13,488 | 0.18% | Lost | Ran on a no party preference line | |
| 2024 | Patrick Burke | Maryland | 879 | 0.03% | Lost | Ran as a write-in candidate | |
| 2024 | Analisa Roche | Texas | 1,492 | 0.01% | Lost | Ran as a write-in candidate | |
| 2022 | Mark Ruzon | California | 206 | 0.01% | Lost | Ran as a write-in candidate | |

=== United States House of Representatives elections ===
In addition to the candidates below, Mike Vick ran as a write-in candidate for Illinois's 2nd congressional district in 2024. Illinois does not report write-in votes separately. The party also endorsed Democrat and AND Campaign co-founder Pastor Chris Butler for U.S. Congress in Illinois's 1st congressional district in 2022. He was eliminated in the Democratic primary, receiving 3,707 votes.

| Year | Candidate | State | District | Votes | % | Result | Notes | Ref. |
|---|---|---|---|---|---|---|---|---|
| 2025 | Reyna Anderson | Texas | TX-18 | 263 | 0.35% | Lost | Ran as an independent; did not advance to top-two general | |
| 2024 | Erskine Levi | California | CA-31 | 1,166 | 1.2% | Lost | Ran on a no party preference line; did not advance to top-two general | |
| 2022 | Oliver Black | Washington | WA-03 | 456 | 0.2% | Lost | Ran as an American Solidarity Party candidate; did not advance to top-two general | |
| 2022 | Erskine Levi | California | CA-31 | 17 | 0.01% | Lost | Ran as a write-in candidate; did not advance to top-two general | |
| 2020 | Shane Hoffman | Ohio | OH-15 | 75 | 0.02% | Lost | Ran as a write-in candidate | |
| 2018 | Brian Carroll | California | CA-22 | 1,591 | 2.2% | Lost | Ran on a no party preference line; did not advance to top-two general | |

=== Statewide elections ===
In addition to the candidates below, Solidarity National Committee member Dr. Tyler Martin ran for governor of Nebraska in 2022. Nebraska does not report write-in votes separately, meaning Martin's vote share is unknown.

| Year | Candidate | Office | State | District | Votes | % | Result | Notes | Ref. |
|---|---|---|---|---|---|---|---|---|---|
| 2026 | Duane Terrence Loynes Jr. | Governor | California | At-Large | | | | Ran on a no party preference line | |
| 2026 | Mike Miller | Governor | Texas | At-Large | | | | Ran as a write-in candidate | |
| 2024 | Eric Anton | Auditor General | Pennsylvania | At-Large | 20,989 | 0.31% | Lost | Ran as an American Solidarity Party candidate | |
| 2024 | Richard McKibbin | Railroad Commissioner | Texas | At-Large | 1,656 | 0.02% | Lost | Ran as a write-in candidate | |
| 2022 | James Hanink | Governor | California | At-Large | 10,110 | 0.14% | Lost | Ran on a no party preference line; did not advance to top-two general | |
| 2022 | Desmond Silveira | Secretary of State | California | At-Large | 235 | 0.01% | Lost | Ran as a write-in candidate | |
| 2022 | Jacqueline Abernathy | Governor | Texas | At-Large | 1,243 | 0.02% | Lost | Ran as a write-in candidate | |
| 2021 | James Hanink | Governor (recall) | California | At-Large | 7,193 | 0.10% | Lost | Ran on a no party preference line; did not advance to top-two general | |
| 2018 | Desmond Silveira | Governor | California | At-Large | 4,633 | 0.07% | Lost | Ran on a no party preference line; did not advance to top-two general | |

=== State legislature elections ===
In addition to the candidates below, in 2024, Amar Patel ran for state representative in Illinois' 48th district, and Jonathan Bruce ran for state representative in South Carolina's 8th district. Neither state reports write-in votes separately.

| Year | Candidate | Office | State | District | Votes | % | Result | Notes | Ref. |
|---|---|---|---|---|---|---|---|---|---|
| 2021 | Benjamin Schmitz | State Senate | Wisconsin | 13 | 194 | 0.52% | Lost | Ran as an American Solidarity Party candidate | |
| 2017 | Monica Sohler | General Assembly | New Jersey | 6 | 821 | 0.71% | Lost | Ran as an American Solidarity Party candidate | |

=== Local elections ===
| Year | Candidate | Office | Area | District | Votes | % | Result | Notes | Ref. |
|---|---|---|---|---|---|---|---|---|---|
| 2025 | Dustin Pieper | City Council | Batavia | 4 | 299 | 62.4% | Won | Non-partisan election | |
| 2025 | Daniel O'Connell | Library Trustee | Lombard | At-Large (four seats) | 1,961 | 7.21% | Lost | Non-partisan election | |
| 2025 | Daniel Hollenbach | Library Trustee | Lombard | At-Large (four seats) | 1,755 | 6.46% | Lost | Non-partisan election | |
| 2025 | Sam Kuhlman | Library Trustee | Lombard | At-Large (four seats) | 1,596 | 5.87% | Lost | Non-partisan election | |
| 2025 | Dustin Himmerich | Library Trustee | Lombard | At-Large (four seats) | 1,536 | 5.85% | Lost | Non-partisan election | |
| 2025 | Richard Petraitis | Library Trustee | Woodridge | At-Large (two seats) | 684 | 13.14% | Lost | Non-partisan election | |
| 2024 | George Dziuk | City Council | Elmendorf | 3 | 47 | 100% | Won | Non-partisan election | |

== Presidential tickets ==
| Election | Name | Running Mate | Campaign Announcement date | Votes |
|---|---|---|---|---|
| 2024 | Peter Sonski; Member Regional School District 17 board of education in Connecticut | Lauren Onak; Community organizer, non-profit executive, and teacher in Massachusetts | Campaign: February 20, 2023 Nomination: June 2, 2023; FEC Filing | 46,472 (#8); 0 EV |
| 2020 | Brian Carroll; Teacher from California | Amar Patel; National Committee Chair of the American Solidarity Party from Illinois | Campaign: April 2, 2019; Nomination: September 9, 2019; FEC Filing | 42,305 (#10); 0 EV |
| 2016 | Mike Maturen replacing Amir Azarvan; Salesperson from Michigan | Juan Muñoz replacing Mike Maturen; State Party Chair from Texas | FEC Filing | 6,697 (#15); 0 EV |

== Presidential election ballot access and results ==
American Solidarity Party ballot access during the 2024 presidential election Certified for ballot Registered write-in Automatic write-in Not on ballot

ASP ballot status in 2020 On ballot Write-in Not on ballot

ASP ballot status in 2016 On ballot Write-in Not on ballot

History of American Solidarity Party ballot access and presidential election results by state or territory
| Year | 2016 | 2020 | 2024 |
|---|---|---|---|
| Party nominees | Mike Maturen (president); Juan Muñoz (vice president) | Brian T. Carroll (president); Amar Patel (vice president) | Peter Sonski (president); Lauren Onak (vice president) |
| States & D.C. ballot access (write-in access) | 1 (25) | 8 (31) | 7 (45) |
| Ballot access to electoral votes (write-in access) | 9 (323) | 66 (397) | 74 (480) |
| Alabama | Unreported | Unreported | Unreported |
| Alaska | Unreported | Unreported | 702 |
| Arizona | | | |
| Arkansas | | 1,713 | 2,141 |
| California | 1,316 | 2,605 | 2,924 |
| Colorado | 862 | 2,515 | 910 |
| Connecticut | | 220 | 162 |
| Delaware | | 87 | 98 |
| District of Columbia | | | |
| Florida | | 854 | 7,454 |
| Georgia | 151 | 756 (Note: This table reflects the results certified by Fulton County which were released after those certified by the state for other counties.) | 730 |
| Guam (advisory) | | 138 | 46 |
| Hawaii | | | 936 |
| Idaho | 35 (Note: May have received write-in votes, which have not yet been reported by the state.) | 163 | 239 |
| Illinois | | 9,548 | 1,391 |
| Indiana | | 895 | 1,347 |
| Iowa | Unreported | Unreported | 195 |
| Kansas | 214 | 583 | 569 |
| Kentucky | 155 | 408 | 611 |
| Louisiana | | 2,497 | 2,240 |
| Maine | | | 65 |
| Maryland | 504 | 795 | 1,012 |
| Massachusetts | | 164 (Note: Compiled from results reported by local governments.) | 280 |
| Michigan | 517 | 963 | 1,212 |
| Minnesota | 244 | 1,037 | 882 |
| Mississippi | | 1,161 | 1,007 |
| Missouri | | 664 | 1,069 |
| Montana | | | |
| Nebraska | Unreported | Unreported | Unreported |
| Nevada | | | |
| New Hampshire | Unreported | 79 | 159 |
| New Jersey | Unreported | 330 (Note: Compiled from results reported by counties.) | 385 |
| New Mexico | | | |
| New York | 409 | 892 | 1,544 |
| North Carolina | | | |
| North Dakota | Unreported | 36 | |
| Ohio | 552 | 1,450 | 10,197 |
| Oklahoma | | | |
| Oregon | Unreported | Unreported | |
| Pennsylvania | Unreported | 1,164 | 829 |
| Rhode Island | 34 | 767 | |
| South Carolina | | | |
| South Dakota | | | |
| Tennessee | | 762 | |
| Texas | 1,401 | 3,207 | 3,780 |
| Utah | | 368 | 441 |
| Vermont | 19 | 209 | 55 |
| Virginia | Unreported | Unreported | 32 |
| Washington | Unreported | 18 (Note: Skagit County was the only county to count write-in votes.) | |
| West Virginia | | | 63 |
| Wisconsin | 284 | 5,259 | 647 |
| Wyoming | | Unreported | |
| Total | 6,697 | 42,305 | 46,472 |

Legend
| Listed on ballot |
| Registered as write-in candidate |
| Write-in candidates allowed without registration |
| Not a candidate in the state/territory/district |

== List of affiliates ==
| State/territorial party | Chairperson | Members | Upper house seats | Lower house seats | Ballot access | Presidential ballot access (2024) |
|---|---|---|---|---|---|---|
| American Solidarity Party of California | Dominick DiCarlo | | 0 / 40 | 0 / 80 | No | Yes |
| American Solidarity Party of Colorado | | | 0 / 35 | 0 / 65 | No | No |
| American Solidarity Party of Florida | | | 0 / 40 | 0 / 120 | Yes | Yes |
| American Solidarity Party of Georgia | | | 0 / 56 | 0 / 180 | No | No |
| American Solidarity Party of Idaho | | | 0 / 35 | 0 / 70 | No | No |
| American Solidarity Party of Illinois | | | 0 / 59 | 0 / 118 | No | No |
| American Solidarity Party of Indiana | Bonnie Kallis | | 0 / 50 | 0 / 100 | No | No |
| American Solidarity Party of Maryland | | | 0 / 47 | 0 / 141 | No | No |
| American Solidarity Party of Massachusetts | | | 0 / 40 | 0 / 160 | No | No |
| American Solidarity Party of Michigan | | | 0 / 38 | 0 / 110 | No | No |
| American Solidarity Party of Missouri | | | 0 / 34 | 0 / 163 | No | No |
| American Solidarity Party of North Carolina | | | 0 / 50 | 0 / 120 | No | No |
| American Solidarity Party of Ohio | Shane Hoffman | | 0 / 33 | 0 / 99 | No | Yes |
| American Solidarity Party of Oregon | | | 0 / 30 | 0 / 60 | No | No |
| American Solidarity Party of Pennsylvania | | | 0 / 50 | 0 / 203 | No | No |
| American Solidarity Party of Tennessee | Jeffery Combs | | 0 / 33 | 0 / 99 | No | No |
| American Solidarity Party of Texas | | | 0 / 31 | 0 / 150 | No | No |
| American Solidarity Party of Utah | | | 0 / 29 | 0 / 75 | No | No |
| American Solidarity Party of Washington | | | 0 / 49 | 0 / 98 | No | No |
| American Solidarity Party of Wisconsin | David Bovee | | 0 / 33 | 0 / 99 | No | No |
| Conservative Party of Delaware | James Sloven | | 0 / 21 | 0 / 41 | Yes | Yes |

== Notable party supporters ==
- Stephen Bainbridge, UCLA law professor
- Charles A. Coulombe, Catholic author, historian, and lecturer
- Patrick Deneen, political theorist and author, member of ASP board of advisors
- Rod Dreher, senior editor and blogger at The American Conservative and author of several books, including How Dante Can Save Your Life and The Benedict Option
- Dan Lipinski, former US representative
- Terry Mattingly, journalist, author, and professor
- Brian Carroll, former ASP presidential candidate
- Mike Maturen, former ASP presidential candidate
- Joe Schriner, former ASP presidential candidate
- George Yancey, sociologist and professor of sociology at Baylor University
- Howard Ahmanson Jr., philanthropist and writer

== See also ==
- Center for Public Justice
- Prohibition Party
- Social Gospel
