= Peter Sonski =

American politician and public servant (born 1962)

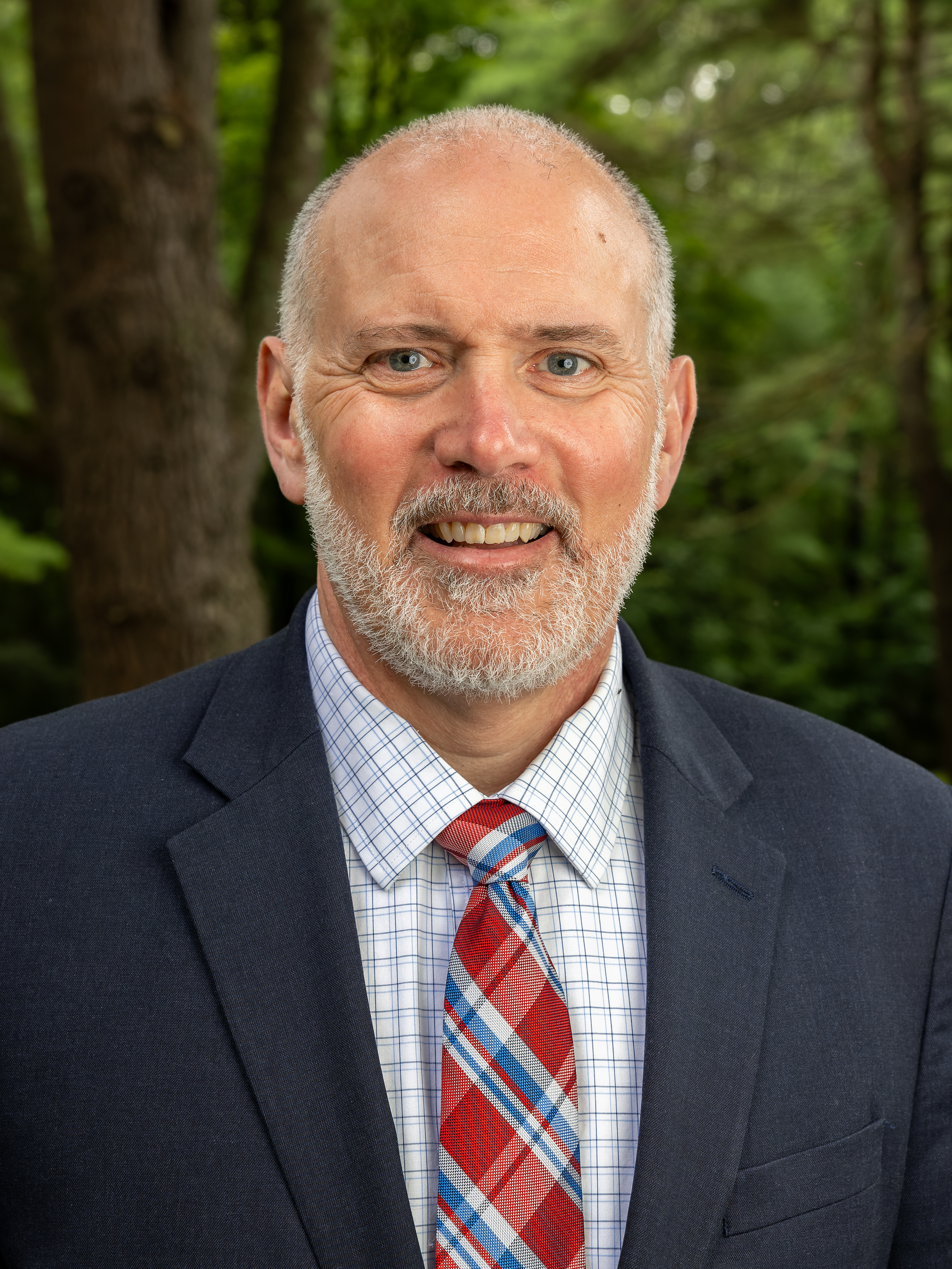
- Sonski in 2023
- Born: Peter Anthony Sonski Jr. July 11, 1962 (age 64); Massachusetts, U.S.
- Education: Catholic University of America
- Military Career
- Allegiance: United States
- Branch: U.S. Marine Corps
- Political party: American Solidarity (2018–present)
- Other political affiliations: Democratic (1970s–1980s); Republican (1980s–2023)
- Children: 9

Peter Anthony Sonski Jr. (born July 11, 1962) is an American former radio host who served as an elected member of Connecticut's Regional School District 17 Board of Education and as director of the Knights of Columbus Museum. A member of the American Solidarity Party, Sonski was the party's nominee for president in the 2024 United States presidential election.

== Early life and education ==
Peter Anthony Sonski Jr. was born in Massachusetts on July 11, 1962. Sonski was raised in a blue collar home. He attended college at the Catholic University of America in Washington, DC.

== Career ==
Sonski's career has primarily been in journalism and local politics. He served as a United States Marine. He was "an assistant editor at the National Catholic Register" and "worked for eight years as director of communications for the Basilica of the National Shrine of the Immaculate Conception in Washington, DC. Besides working for several Catholic newspapers, he became a selectman in the town of Somers, Connecticut.

== 2024 presidential campaign ==
On February 20, 2023, Sonski announced his candidacy for President of the United States in the American Solidarity Party primary. The party, a "pro-life political party with a platform based largely on Catholic teaching", has conducted primaries by an online vote open to all dues-paying members using ranked-choice voting. Sonski won on the first ballot, with 52% of first choice votes.

== Political positions ==
Sonski registered to vote as a Democrat when he turned 18 and voted for Jimmy Carter. He became a Republican during the Reagan presidency, saying that it was "the Democratic Party, the party of little guy, that left me, and it decided that the little guy in the womb was exposable." He soon left that party as well and considered himself an independent. However, he was elected as a Republican to Connecticut's District 17 Board of Education. He joined the American Solidarity Party in 2018.

As a proponent of Christian democracy, Sonski supports a consistent life ethic, being against abortion (having been an anti-abortion activist "for decades", capital punishment, and euthanasia. He additionally supports social justice initiatives. He is against the legalization of same-sex marriage and believes that homosexual couples should not have the same adoption rights as heterosexual couples. He has endorsed public intellectual Robert P. George's initiative to rebrand June as Fidelity Month.

Sonski believes the US should continue to provide Ukraine with defensive support, and supports Israel's right to defend itself, though wants it to cease fighting in Gaza and allow more humanitarian aid. He supports government social programs, though believes they are often better managed privately or at the local level. On immigration, Sonski supports increased border security and says the US should be open to people seeking asylum or opportunities.

== Personal life ==
Sonski has been a resident of Connecticut. He has nine children.
