= Third-party and independent candidates for the 2024 United States presidential election =

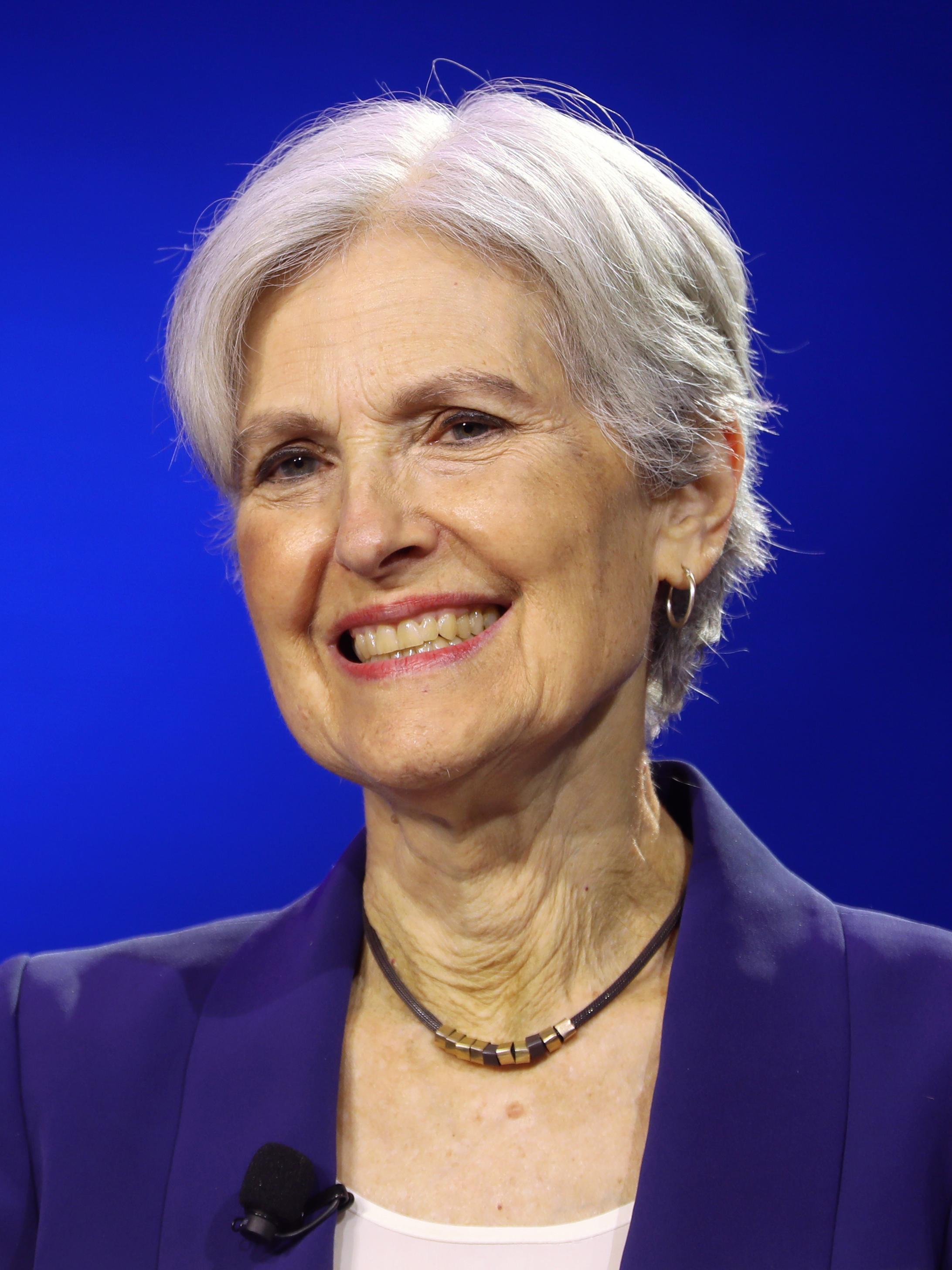

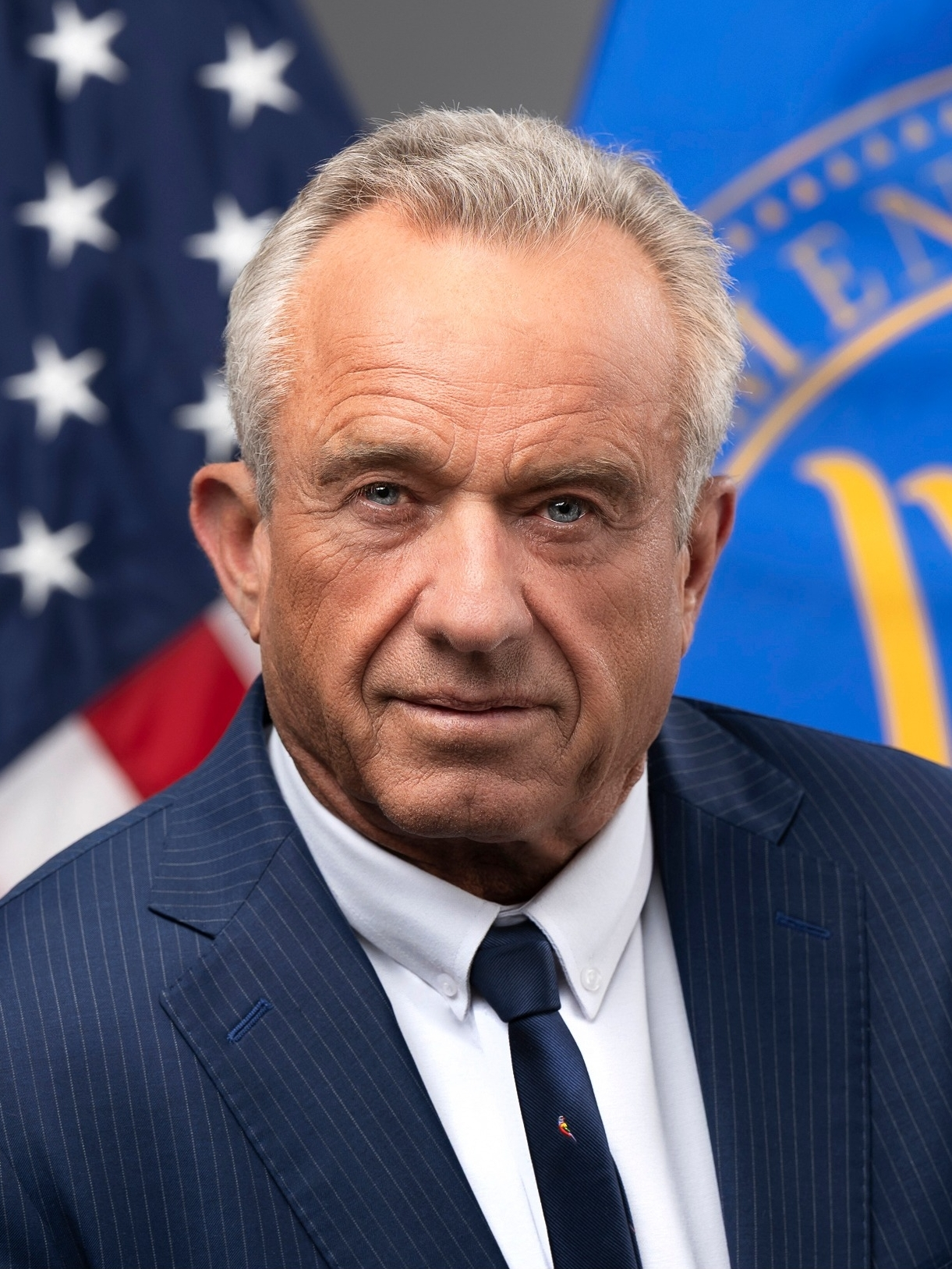

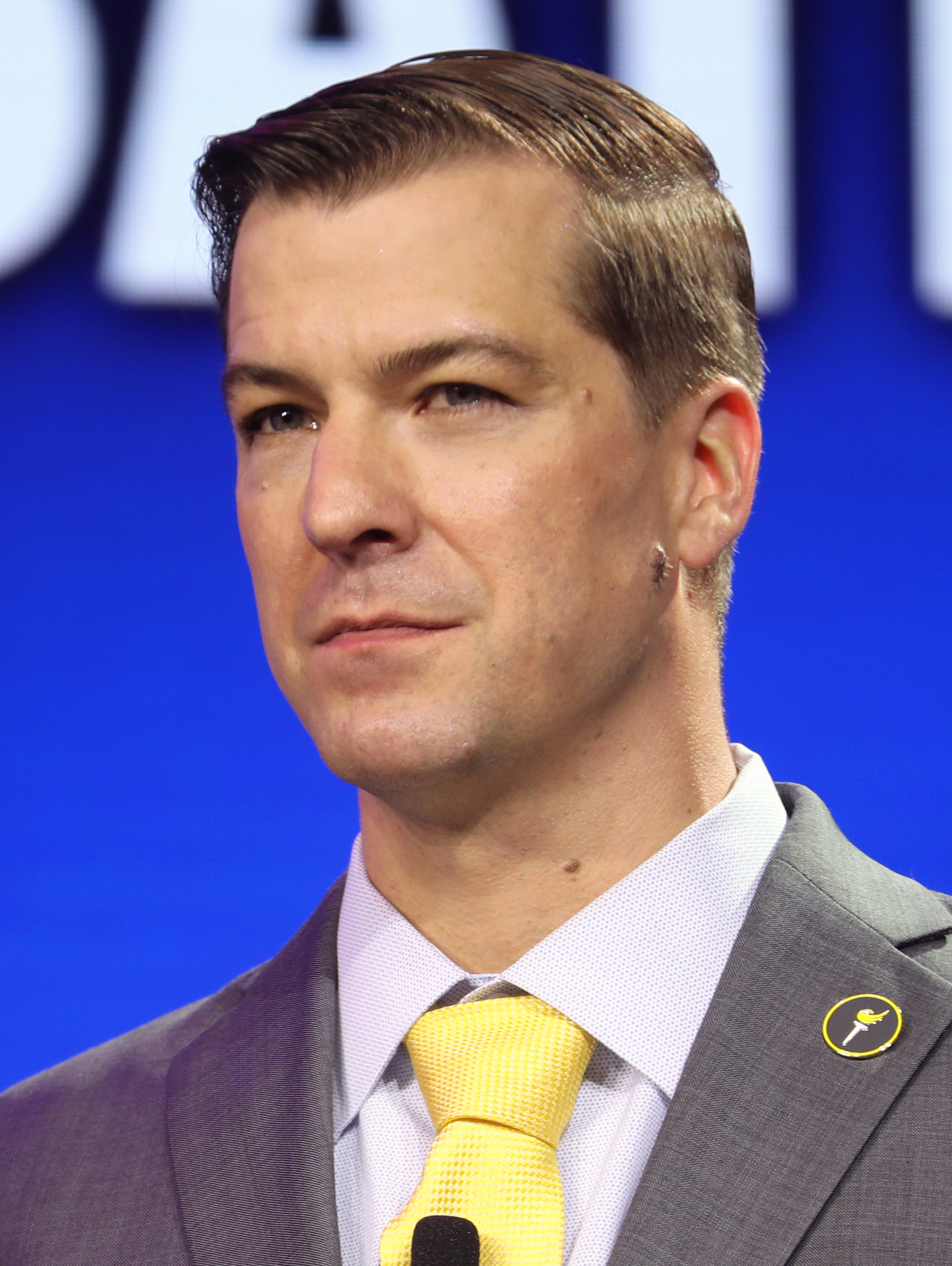

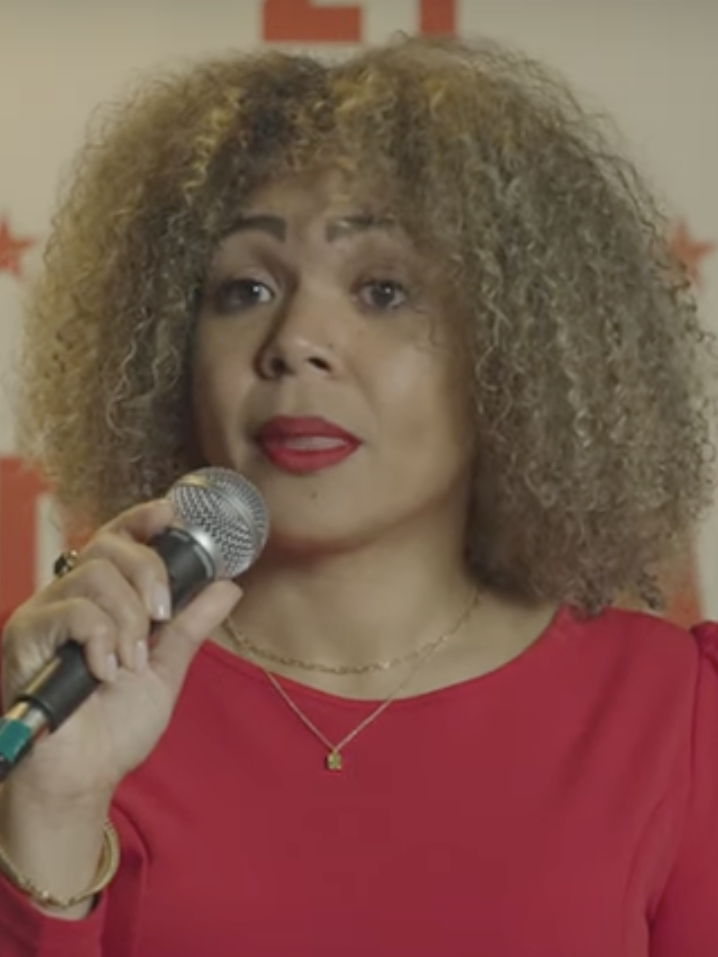

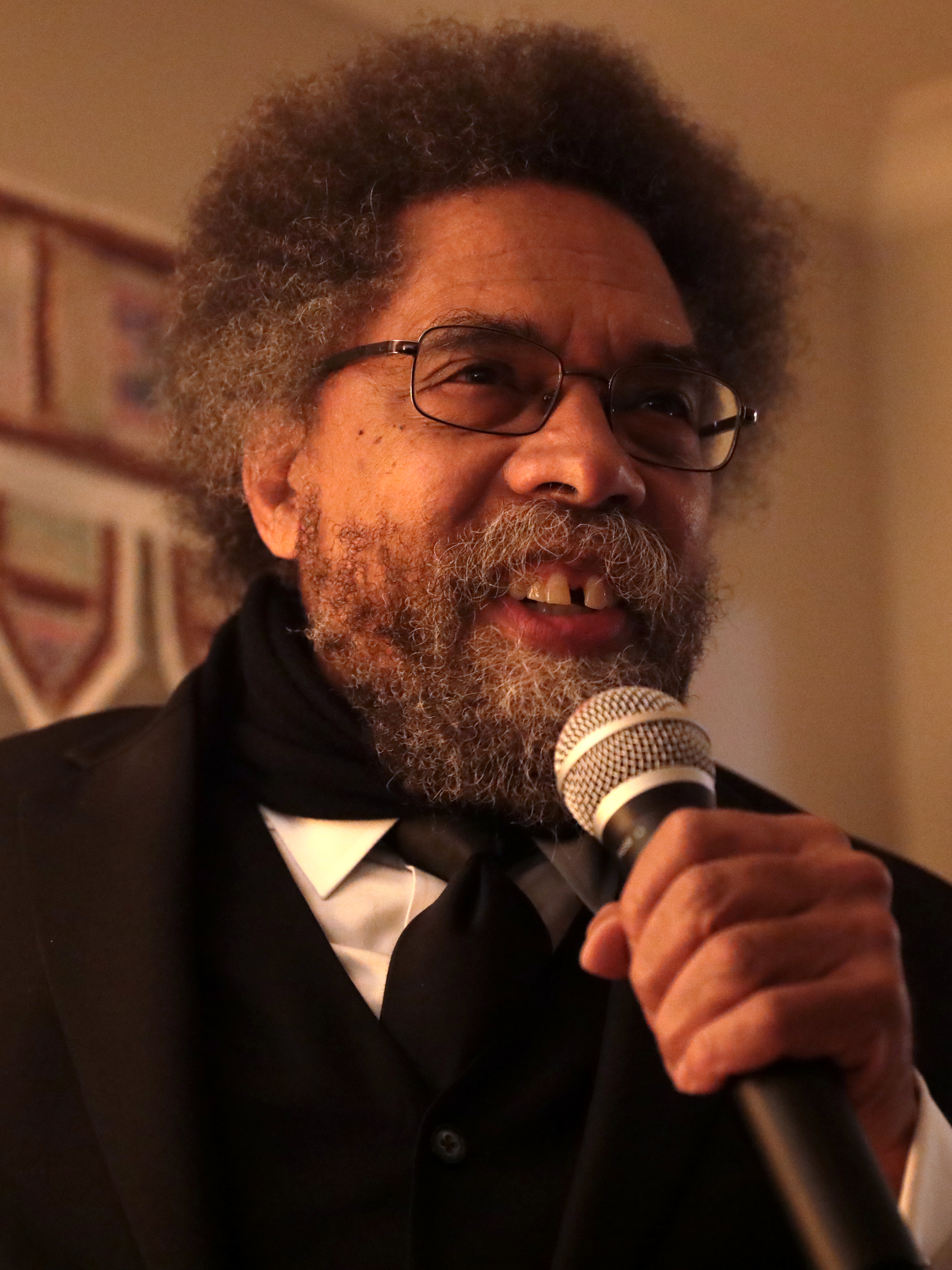

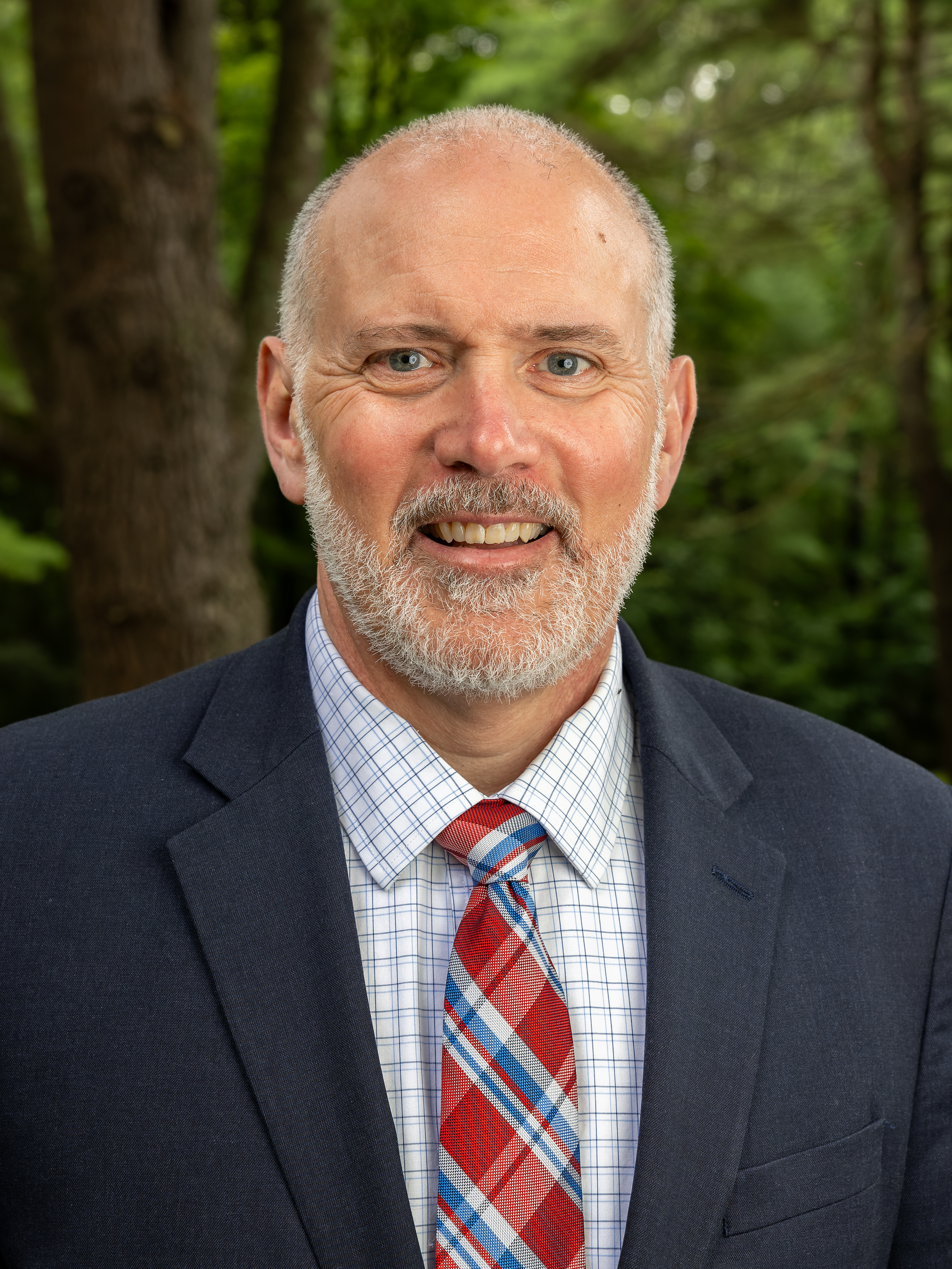

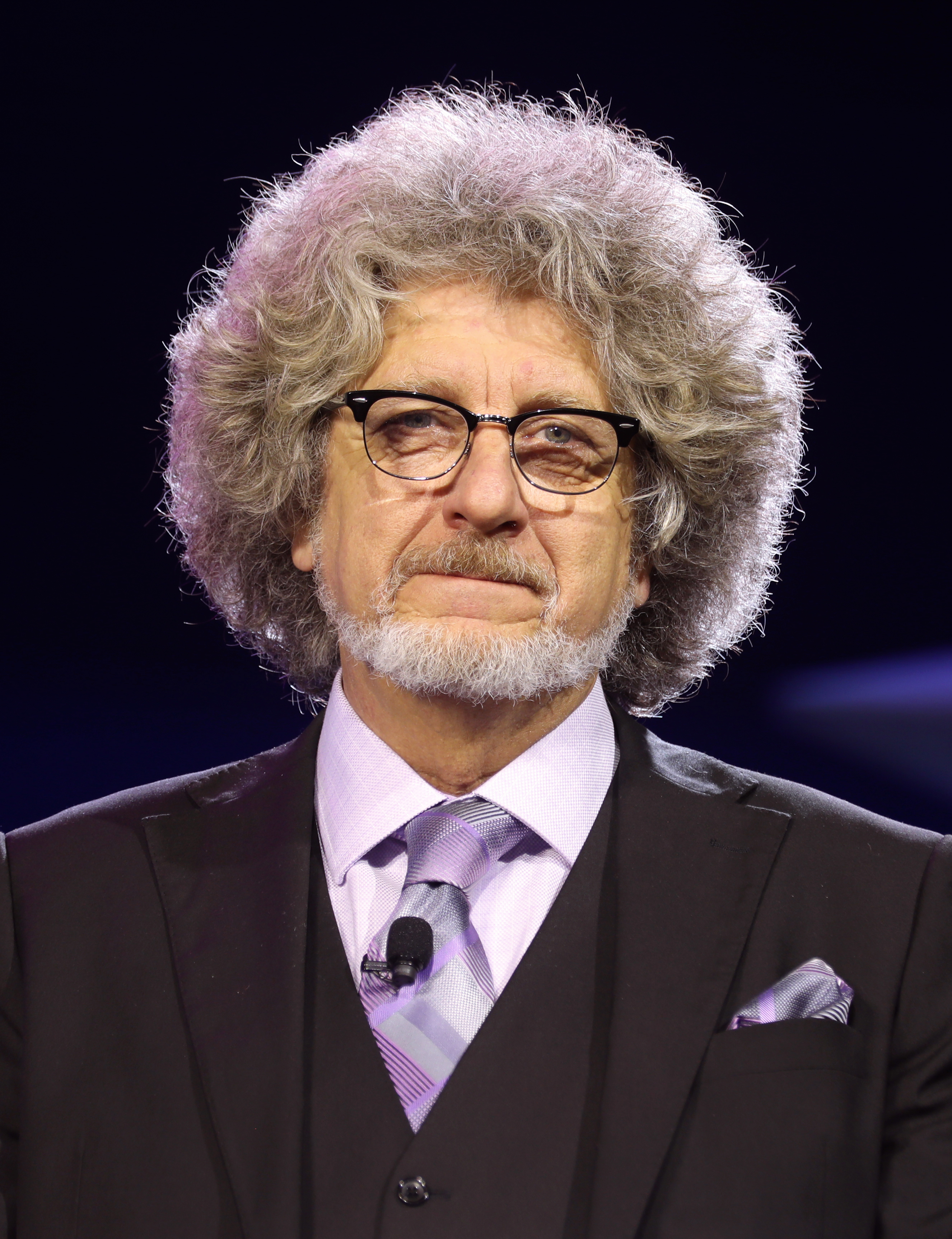

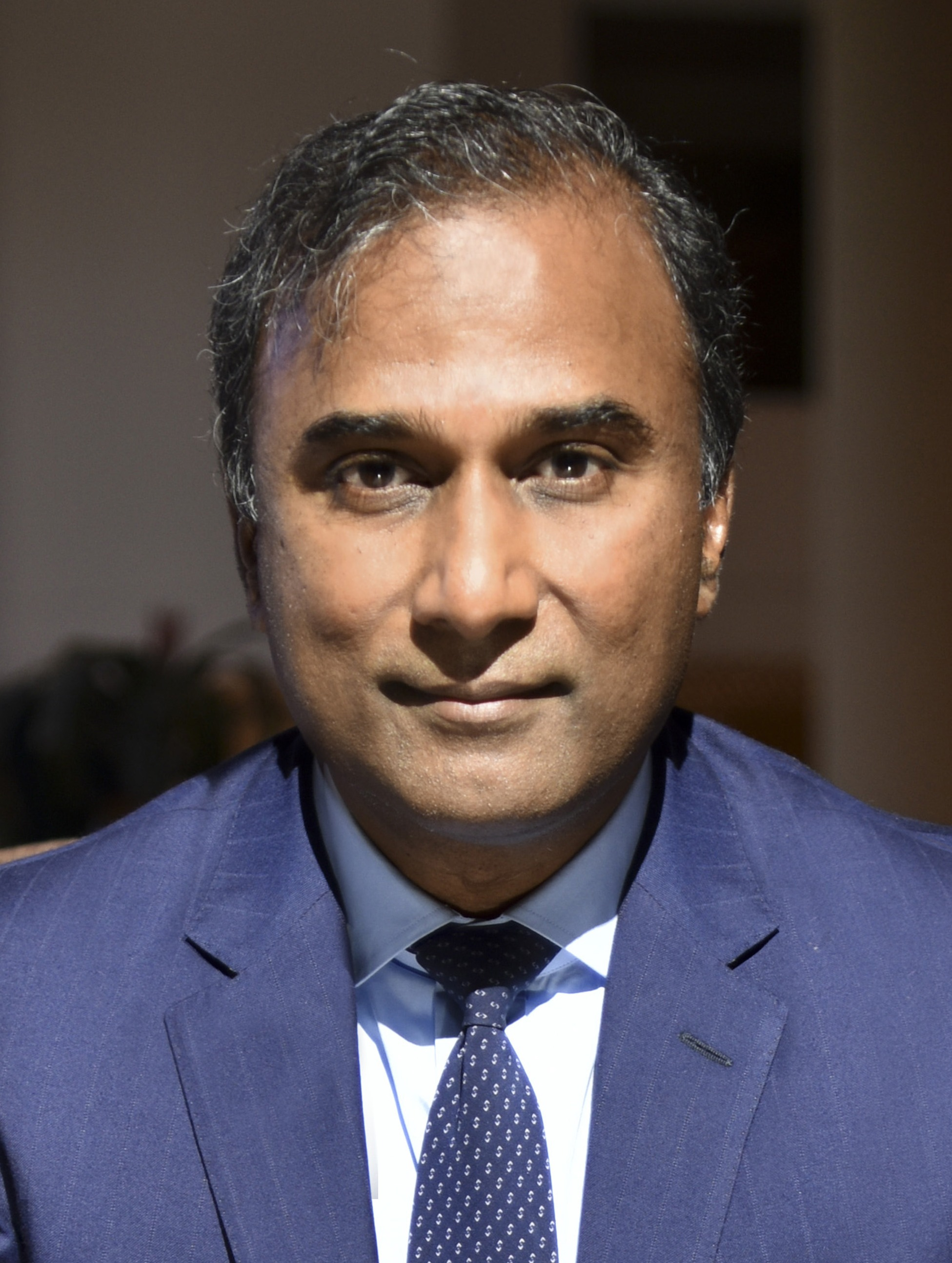
Nominee	Jill Stein	Robert F. Kennedy Jr. (withdrawn)	Chase Oliver
Party	Green (Note: Stein was listed as an independent in six states) (Note: The Green Party was listed as the Maine Green Independent Party in Maine, as the Mountain Party in West Virginia, as the Pacific Green Party in Oregon, and as the Green-Rainbow Party in Massachusetts)	Independent (Note: Kennedy was listed as the We the People Party, a party he created, in eight states and Team Kennedy in one state)	Libertarian (Note: Oliver was listed as an independent in one state)
Alliance	Kentucky	Parties: American Independent; Natural Law (Note: Michigan affiliate only); Delaware Independent; Reform (withdrawn); Alliance (Note: South Carolina affiliate only) (withdrawn)	Liberal (Note: Massachusetts affiliate only)
Home state	Massachusetts	New York	Georgia
Running mate	Butch Ware	Nicole Shanahan	Mike ter Maat
Popular vote	871,222	757,432	650,317
Percentage	0.56%	0.49%	0.42%
Nominee	Claudia De la Cruz	Cornel West	Peter Sonski
Party	Socialism and Liberation (Note: de la Cruz was listed as an independent in six states)	Independent (Note: West is listed as the Justice For All Party, a party he created, in six states)	American Solidarity (Note: Sonski was listed as an independent in two states)
Alliance	Parties: Peace and Freedom; South Carolina Workers	Parties: Unity (Note: Colorado affiliate only); United Citizens; Oregon Progressive; Nebraska Legal Marijuana NOW (Note: Nebraska affiliate only); Aurora; Green Mountain Peace and Justice
Home state	New York	California	Connecticut
Running mate	Karina Garcia	Melina Abdullah	Lauren Onak
Popular vote	168,234	84,588	47,070
Percentage	0.11%	0.05%	0.03%
Nominee	Randall Terry	Shiva Ayyadurai
Party	Constitution (Note: Terry was listed as an independent in one state) (Note: The Constitution Party was listed as the U.S. Taxpayer's Party in Michigan. Four Constitution affiliates refused to place Terry on the ballot)	Independent
Alliance	Oregon Constitution
Home state	Tennessee	Massachusetts
Running mate	Stephen Broden	Crystal Ellis
Popular vote	41,412	28,560
Percentage	0.03%	0.02%
- Third-place finisher by state

This article lists third party and independent candidates, also jointly known as minor-party candidates, associated with the 2024 United States presidential election.

"Third party" is a term commonly used in the United States in reference to political parties other than the Democratic and Republican parties. An independent candidate is one not affiliated with any political party.

24 candidates were listed on the ballot in at least one state and over 100 candidates were registered as a write-in candidate in at least one state.

== Results ==
Third-party and independent candidates received 2.13% of the vote in the 2024 election, totaling over three million votes. This is slightly more than the 2020 United States presidential election, when third party candidates received 1.86%.

Green Party nominee Jill Stein received the most votes of any third-party candidate, receiving 868,945 votes (0.56%). She received 1.09% of the vote in Maryland, her best state by percentage. Stein also received over one percent of the vote in Maine and California.

Withdrawn independent candidate Robert F. Kennedy Jr. received 757,371 votes (0.49%). Kennedy's 1.96% in Montana was the highest statewide vote share of any third-party candidate. Kennedy also received over one percent of the vote in Alaska, Arkansas, California, Colorado, Idaho, Illinois, Indiana, Kansas, New Mexico, Oklahoma, Oregon, South Dakota, Vermont, Washington, and West Virginia.

Libertarian candidate Chase Oliver received 650,120 votes (0.42%). He was the only third-party candidate to be on the ballot or a registered write-in candidate in every state + D.C. Oliver received 1.69% in North Dakota, his best state by percentage. Oliver also received over one percent of the vote in Utah and Wyoming.

No other candidate reached one percent of the vote in any state. "None of these candidates" received 19,625 votes (1.32%) in Nevada.

Party for Socialism and Liberation nominee, Claudia De la Cruz received 167,772 votes (0.11%). De la Cruz nearly doubled the PSL's 2020 total, and won the most votes received by a candidate running on an explicitly socialist presidential ticket since the Socialist Party's Norman Thomas in 1936.

Show/hide: [presidential candidates] [vice presidential candidates] [parties] [ballot access]

2024 presidential candidates that received at least 0.01% of the vote
Presidential candidate		Donald Trump	Kamala Harris	Jill Stein	Robert F Kennedy Jr.	Chase Oliver	Claudia De la Cruz	Cornel West	Peter Sonski	Randall Terry	Shiva Ayyadurai		
Vice presidential candidate		JD Vance	Tim Walz	Butch Ware	Nicole Shanahan	Mike ter Maat	Karina Garcia	Melina Abdullah	Lauren Onak	Stephen Broden	Crystal Ellis		
Party or label (Note: In some states, some candidates were listed as independent or unaffiliated rather than their political party or label.)		Republican	Democratic	Green	Independent	Libertarian	PSL (Note: Nominated by the Peace and Freedom Party in California.)	Independent	American Solidarity	Constitution	Independent		
EV access	Ballot	538	538	420	283	477	220	132	74	133	57		
EV access	Total	538	538	488	309	538	473	366	474	181	371		
State/DC	EV	1	2	3	4	5	6	7	8	9	10	Others	Total votes
Alabama	9	1,462,616	772,412	4,319	12,075	4,930	(Note: May have received write-in votes, which were not reported individually and are included in others.)					8,738	2,265,090
Alaska	3	184,458	140,026	2,340	5,670	3,040		1,127	702	812		0	337,733
Arizona	11	1,770,242	1,582,860	18,319		17,898	689				77	8,041	3,398,196
Arkansas	6	759,241	396,905	4,275	13,255	5,715			2,141			1,144	1,182,676
California	54	6,081,697	9,276,179	167,772	197,645	66,662	72,539		2,924			2,877	15,868,168
Colorado	10	1,377,441	1,728,159	17,344	35,623	21,439	905	5,149	910	3,522	15	2,238	3,192,745
Connecticut	7	736,918	992,053	14,281	8,448	6,729	264	128	162		21		1,757,061
Delaware	3	214,351	289,758	914	4,636	2,038	87	96	98		37		512,912
D. of Columbia	3	21,076	294,185	2,259 (Note: Write-in votes unofficially compiled from results from FOIA request. Included in others.)	2,778	208	625	472	130	5	7	7,830	325,869
Florida	30	6,110,125	4,683,038	43,155		31,972	11,969		7,454	5,834	199		10,893,752
Georgia	16	2,663,117	2,548,017	18,229		20,684	376	424	730		37		5,251,705
Hawaii	4	193,661	313,044	4,387		2,733	1,940		936				516,701
Idaho	4	605,246	274,972	3,873|2973	12,812	4,462	1,230		239|242	1,026	514	1,580	905,057
Illinois	19	2,449,079	3,062,863	31,023	80,426	3,510	2,877	1,569	1,391		42	1,122	5,634,432
Indiana	11	1,720,347	1,163,603		29,325	20,425	832	722	1,347			945	2,937,622
Iowa	6	927,019	707,278		13,122	7,218	1,427		195		424	6,657	1,663,701
Kansas	6	758,802	544,853	866|0	16,322	7,614	270|0	52|0	569|0		5|0	0	1,327,591
Kentucky	8	1,337,494	704,043	7,566	16,769	6,422	391	177	611		1,015		2,074,513
Louisiana	8	1,208,505	766,870	7,138	6,641	6,835	1,481	2,623	2,240	1,424		3,218	2,006,975
Maine	4	377,977	435,652	8,967		5,286	332 (Note: Write-in votes unofficially compiled from results reported by local governments. Included in others.)	2,912	72		23	581	832,831
Maryland	10	1,035,550	1,902,577	33,134	28,819	15,570	1,136	918	1,012		31	19,394	3,038,344
Massachusetts	11	1,251,303	2,126,518	26,545		17,735	12,889	243	280		18,418	19,693	3,473,624
Michigan	15	2,816,636	2,736,533	44,607	26,785	22,440	458	6,664	1,212	6,509		11,840	5,676,026
Minnesota	10	1,519,032	1,656,979	16,275	24,001	15,155	2,996	3,136	882		2,885	12,035	3,253,920
Mississippi	6	747,744	466,668	1,873	5,387	2,536	1,075		1,007	1,030	688		1,228,008
Missouri	10	1,751,986	1,200,599	17,135		23,876	618		1,069		34		2,995,327
Montana	4	352,079	231,906	2,878	11,825	4,275					21		602,984
Nebraska	5	564,816	369,995	2,887		6,399		3,062					947,273
Nevada	6	751,205	705,197			6,059						22,379	1,484,840
New Hampshire	4	395,523	418,488	3,680	331	4,425	139	56	159	21	13	1,438	826,152
New Jersey	14	1,968,215	2,220,713	39,041	23,479	10,500	5,105	434	385	3,024	49	7,738	4,285,271
New Mexico	5	423,391	478,802	4,611	9,553	3,745	2,442						923,403
New York	28	3,578,899	4,619,195	46,698		5,338	6,327	4,152	1,544		134	46,404	8,308,899
North Carolina	16	2,898,423	2,715,375	24,762		22,125	528	12,099		6,863	30	18,936	5,699,141
North Dakota	3	246,505	112,327			6,227						3,096	368,155
Ohio	17	3,180,116	2,533,699	5,304 (Note: Jill Stein was on the ballot and various counties reported her vote tallies, but the state didn't report her tally nor include the tally in the total tally.)		28,200	1,794	852	10,197		74	12,856	5,767,788
Oklahoma	7	1,036,213	499,599		16,020	9,198						5,143	1,566,173
Oregon	8	919,480	1,240,600	19,099	33,733	9,061		5,644		1,850		15,026	2,244,493
Pennsylvania	19	3,543,308	3,423,042	34,538	619	33,318	478	386	829	93	30	10,486	7,049,935
Rhode Island	4	214,406	285,156	2,900	5,045	1,617	1,176	98 (Note: Write-in votes unofficially compiled from results from FOIA request. Included in others.)	138	2	12	2,727	513,386
South Carolina	9	1,483,747	1,028,452	8,117		12,669	3,059	6,744		5,352			2,548,140
South Dakota	3	272,081	146,859		7,204	2,778							428,922
Tennessee	11	1,966,865	1,056,265	8,967	21,535		3,457					6,853	3,063,942
Texas	40	6,393,597	4,835,250	82,701		68,557	2,374	1,858	3,780		433		11,388,674
Utah	6	883,818	562,566	8,222		16,873	3,189	2,199	441				1,488,466
Vermont	3	119,395	235,791	898|893	5,905	1,828	1,710	1,549	55	7	11	2,278	369,422
Virginia	13	2,075,085	2,335,395	34,888		19,814	8,410	8,984	32				4,482,794
Washington	12	1,530,923	2,245,849	29,754	54,868	16,428	8,695	7,254			3,323	27,149	3,924,243
West Virginia	4	533,556	214,309	2,531	8,947	3,047	73	39	63		10	209	762,785
Wisconsin	10	1,697,626	1,668,229	12,275	17,740	10,511	2,035	2,753	647	4,044		1,114	3,416,987
Wyoming	3	192,633	69,527			4,193						2,695	269,048
Total	538	77,303,568	75,019,230	871,222	757,432	650,317	168,234	84,588	47,070	41,420	28,583	251,387	155,289,233

Other candidates with ballot access in at least one state
Presidential candidate		Richard Duncan	Joel Skousen	Jay Bowman	Chris Garrity	Joseph Kishore	Rachele Fruit	Mattie Preston	Lucifer Everylove	Blake Huber	Michael Wood	Vermin Supreme	Laura Ebke	William Stodden	Robby Wells
Vice presidential candidate		Mitch Bupp	Rik Combs	De Bowman	Cody Ballard	Jerry White	Dennis Richter	Shannel Conner		Andrea Denault	John Pietrowski	Jonathan Realz	Trisha Butler	Stephanie Cholensky	Tony Jones
Party or label		indep.	Constitution (Utah)	indep.	indep.	Socialist Equality	Socialist Workers	indep.	indep.	Approval Voting	Prohibition	Pirate	Liberal	Socialist Party	Party Party
EV access	Ballot	17	16	11	7	41	58	8	6	10	6	3	5	6	4
EV access	Total	87	109	155	152	157	111	78	76	80	76	73	75	83	92
State/DC	EV	11	12	13	15	16	17	18	19	20	21	22	23	26	27
Alabama	9														
Arizona	11		53												
Arkansas	6										1,144				
Colorado	10				30					2,196					
Delaware	3											914		0	
D. of Columbia	3						4					3			
Georgia	16			30											
Idaho	4		1,577												
Illinois	19					12									
Iowa	6													361	
Kansas	6				0										
Kentucky	8			10		8									
Louisiana	8						361	2,857							
Maryland	10					12								3	
Michigan	15			4		2,330									
Minnesota	10					3	1	457							
Nevada	6		2,754			3	1	457							
New Hampshire	4		2		2	2						55			
New Jersey	14					1,364	1,270					1			2
New Mexico	5												859		
New York	28				108										
Ohio	17	12,805		3	13										
Oklahoma	7				5,143										
Oregon	4														
Pennsylvania	19		2			11									
Rhode Island	4	0	0	0	0	2	0	0	0	2	1	2	0	0	359
Tennessee	11			5,865			988								
Utah	6		8,402	59					2,653						
Vermont	3	1 (Note: Unofficially compiled from results reported by the state. Included in others.)	1		1	2	211	1				10			
Virginia	13					0									
Washington	12					917	824								
West Virginia	4				0										
Wyoming	3														
Total	538	12,806	12,792	5,971	5,300	4,668	4,122	2,858	2,653	2,198	1,145	985	859	364	361

Non-qualified write-ins with at least three votes
Presidential candidate	DC	NH	NJ	PA	RI	VT	Total
Nikki Haley	642	1,017	2,127	2,206	453	452	6,976
Mitt Romney	198	82	235	79	91	47	732
Mike Pence	16	98	134	269	35	45	597
Liz Cheney	38	46	167	93	60	43	447
Bernie Sanders	112	28	136		40	103	419
Ron DeSantis	43	51	131	120	34	28	407
Chris Christie	12	44	201	16	18	17	308
Jesus	59	46	92		51		248
Chris Sununu		198					198
Condoleezza Rice	32	14	102		18	16	182
Tulsi Gabbard	13	72	62	7	4	21	179
Phil Scott						136	136
Joe Biden	49	49			26	12	136
Rashida Tlaib	87	4	20		10	15	136
JD Vance	11	41	29		8	14	103
Josh Shapiro	15		47	32	6	3	103
Joe Manchin	13		49	10	15	11	98
Paul Ryan	58		8		8	4	78
Mickey Mouse	10		32		29		71
Vivek Ramaswamy	4	14	26		14		58
Ritchie Torres	6		46		3		55
Andrew Yang	11		33		10		54
John Kasich	5	10	22		9	8	54
Pete Buttigieg	17	10	11		7	9	54
Michael Bloomberg	6		40		4		50
Larry Hogan	43						43
Kanye West	9	5	15		11		40
Ron Paul	5	18	2		6	9	40
Glenn Youngkin	34				3		37
Michelle Obama	9		8		9	11	37
Tim Scott	18	16					34
Ronald Reagan	9		6		17		32
Jimmy Carter	10	5	6		7		28
Ben Sasse	24				3		27
Brian Kemp	7		14		5		26
Dean Phillips	9				6	11	26
Marco Rubio	9		6			11	24
Adam Kinzinger	8		11		3		22
Hind Rajab	21						21
God	9				11		20
Ben Carson	3		8		3	4	18
Hillary Clinton	11		7				18
Jamie Dimon	8		9				17
Jim Douglas						17	17
Taylor Swift			7		5	5	17
Dwayne Johnson	4				10		14
George W. Bush	10				4		14
George Washington		6	4		3		13
Thomas Massie	5		4		4		13
Wes Moore	8		5				13
Jeb Bush	8		4				12
John Fetterman	6		6				12
Elizabeth Warren	11						11
Mitch Daniels	11						11
Josh Gottheimer			10				10
Marianne Williamson	6		4				10
Alexandria Ocasio-Cortez	9						9
Mark Cuban	3				3	3	9
Jasmine Sherman	8						8
Justin Amash	8						8
LeBron James			3		5		8
Tim Walz	3				5		8
Yahya Sinwar	8						8
Bill Cassidy	6						6
Brian Gill						6	6
Elon Musk					3	3	6
Jim Mattis	6						6
John Thune	6						6
Mitch McConnell	6						6
Patrick McHenry	6						6
Tom Brady					3	3	6
Barack Obama	5						5
Jon Stewart	5						5
Mark Dever	5						5
Pat Toomey	5						5
Thomas Sowell	5						5
Willie Nelson			1			4	5
Aaron Bushnell	4						4
Dolly Parton						4	4
Gretchen Whitmer	4						4
Mike DeWine	4						4
Mike Johnson	4						4
Rob Portman	4						4
Snoop Dogg						4	4
Tom Cotton	4						4
Aida Foonr						3	3
Amy Klobuchar			3				3
Andrew Leyden	3						3
Batman	3						3
David French	3						3
Emmett McElroy			3				3
Jocko Willink	3						3
John Boehner	3						3
Kellie Spain	3						3
Mark Kelly	3						3
Monica Brinson			3				3
Pat Paulsen						3	3
Pedro						3	3
Susan Collins	3						3
Theodore Roosevelt	3						3
Yahweh	3						3

Legend
Listed on ballot
Registered as write-in candidate
Write-in candidates allowed without registration
Not a candidate in the state/DC

== General election candidates ==
=== Candidates with majority ballot access ===
The following general election candidates had ballot access to at least 270 electoral votes (EV), the minimum number required to win the electoral college. Ballot access deadlines vary from state to state.

Party	Presidential nominee	Vice presidential nominee	Campaign	States with ballot access
Libertarian	Chase Oliver; Nominee for U.S. Senator from Georgia in 2022 and sales executive from Georgia	Mike ter Maat; Former economist at the Office of Management and Budget and police officer from Florida	Website Campaign FEC filings Additional party nominations: Libertarian Association of Massachusetts (MA) (Note: Affiliate of Liberal Party USA, disaffiliated from the Libertarian Party); Listed as an independent in: AL	Certified for ballot (47 states, 477 electors) (Note: Oliver on the ballot in: Alabama (9, as Independent); Alaska (3); Arizona (11); Arkansas (6); California (54); Colorado (10); Connecticut (7); Delaware (3); Florida (30); Georgia (16); Hawaii (4); Idaho (4); Indiana (11); Iowa (6); Kansas (6); Kentucky (8); Louisiana (8); Maine (4); Maryland (10); Massachusetts (11); Michigan (15); Minnesota (10); Mississippi (6); Missouri (10); Montana (4); Nebraska (5); Nevada (6); New Hampshire (4); New Jersey (14); New Mexico (5); North Carolina (16); North Dakota (3); Ohio (17); Oklahoma (7); Oregon (8); Pennsylvania (19); Rhode Island (4); South Carolina (9); South Dakota (3); Texas (40); Utah (6); Vermont (3); Virginia (13); Washington (12); West Virginia (4); Wisconsin (10); Wyoming (3)) Registered write-in (3 states + D.C., 61 electors) (Note: Oliver registered write-in in: District of Columbia (3); Illinois (19); New York (28); Tennessee (11))
Green (Note: The Green Party is listed as the Maine Green Independent Party in Maine, as the Mountain Party in West Virginia, as the Pacific Green Party in Oregon, and as the Green-Rainbow Party in Massachusetts)	Jill Stein; Nominee for U.S. President in 2012 and 2016 from Massachusetts	Butch Ware (Note: Florida activist Samson LeBeau Kpadenou is the placeholder vice presidential nominee for Ware in six states.); Academic from California	Website Campaign FEC filings Additional party nominations: Kentucky Party (KY); Listed as an independent in: AL, AK, ID, NE, OH, TN	Certified for ballot (37 states, 420 electors) (Note: Stein on the ballot in: Alabama (9, Independent); Alaska (3, as Independent); Arizona (11); Arkansas (6); California (54); Colorado (10); Connecticut (7); Florida (30); Georgia (16); Hawaii (4); Idaho (4, as independent); Kentucky (8, as Kentucky Party); Louisiana (8); Maine (4); Maryland (10); Massachusetts (11); Michigan (15); Minnesota (10); Mississippi (6); Missouri (10); Montana (4); Nebraska (5); New Hampshire (4); New Jersey (14); New Mexico (5); North Carolina (16); Oregon (8); Pennsylvania (19); Rhode Island (4); South Carolina (9); Tennessee (11, as Independent); Texas (40); Utah (6); Virginia (13); Washington (12); West Virginia (4); Wisconsin (10)) Registered write-in (Four states, 56 electors) (Note: Stein registered write-in in: Delaware (3); Illinois (19); Kansas (6); New York (28)) Automatic write-in (Three states, 12 electors) (Note: Stein write-in states: Iowa (6); Vermont (3); Wyoming (3)) On ballot, votes did not count (One state, 17 electors) (Note: Stein disqualified states: Ohio (17, as Independent)) Not on ballot

=== Candidates with majority ballot or write-in access ===
The following candidates had either ballot or write-in access to more than 270 electoral votes (EV), the minimum number required to attain the presidency.

Party	Presidential nominee	Vice presidential nominee	Campaign	States with ballot access
Party for Socialism and Liberation	Claudia De la Cruz; Activist from New York	Karina Garcia; Activist from California	Website Campaign FEC filings Additional party nominations: South Carolina Workers Party (SC); Peace and Freedom Party (CA); Listed as an independent in: ID, GA, MS, UT, TN, VA	Certified for ballot (19 states, 220 electors) (Note: De la Cruz on the ballot in: California (54, as Peace and Freedom Party); Florida (30); Hawaii (4); Idaho (4); Iowa (6); Louisiana (8); Massachusetts (11); Minnesota (10); Mississippi (6, as Independent); New Jersey (14); New Mexico (5); Rhode Island (4); South Carolina (9, as South Carolina Workers Party); Tennessee (11, as Independent); Utah (6, as Independent); Vermont (3); Virginia (13, as Independent); Washington (12); Wisconsin (10)) Registered write-in (18 states + D.C., 225 electors) (Note: De la Cruz registered write-in in: Arizona (11); Colorado (10); Connecticut (7); Delaware (3); District of Columbia (3); Illinois (19); Indiana (11); Kansas (6); Kentucky (8); Maine (4); Maryland (10); Michigan (15); Missouri (10); New York (28); North Carolina (16); North Dakota (3); Ohio (17); Texas (40); West Virginia (4)) Automatic write-in (Five states, 43 electors) (Note: De la Cruz write-in states: Alabama (9); New Hampshire (4); Oregon (8); Pennsylvania (19); Wyoming (3)) On ballot, votes did not count (One state, 16 electors) (Note: De la Cruz disqualified states: Georgia (16)) Not on ballot
Independent	Cornel West; Academic and activist from California	Melina Abdullah; Academic and activist from California	Website Campaign FEC filings Additional party nominations: Aurora Party (AK); Oregon Progressive Party (OR); United Citizens Party (SC); Unity Party of Colorado (Note: Disaffiliated from Unity Party of America) (CO); Green Mountain Peace and Justice Party (VT); Nebraska Legal Marijuana NOW Party (NE); Justice For All Party (LA, ME, MN, NC, WA, WI)	Certified for ballot (15 states, 132 electors) (Note: West on the ballot in: Alaska (3, as Aurora Party); Colorado (10, as Unity Party); Louisiana (8, as Justice For All); Maine (4, as Justice For All); Michigan (15); Minnesota (10, as Justice For All); Nebraska (5, as Nebraska Legal Marijuana NOW Party); North Carolina (16, as Justice For All); Oregon (8, as Progressive Party); South Carolina (9, as United Citizens Party); Utah (6); Vermont (3, as Green Mountain Peace and Justice Party); Virginia (13); Washington (12, as Justice For All Party); Wisconsin (10, as Justice For All Party)) Registered write-in (13 states, 175 electors) (Note: West registered write-in in: Connecticut (7); Delaware (3); Illinois (19); Indiana (11); Kansas (6); Kentucky (8); Maryland (10); Massachusetts (11); New York (28); Ohio (17); Tennessee (11); Texas (40); West Virginia (4)) Automatic write-in (Seven states, 59 electors) (Note: West write-in states: Alabama (9); Iowa (6); New Hampshire (4); New Jersey (14); Pennsylvania (19); Rhode Island (4); Wyoming (3)) On ballot, votes did not count (One state, 16 electors) (Note: West disqualified states: Georgia (16)) Not on ballot
American Solidarity Party	Peter Sonski; Local politician and museum director from Connecticut	Lauren Onak; Teacher and non-profit executive from Massachusetts	Website Campaign June 13, 2023; FEC filings Listed as an independent in: MS, OH	Certified for ballot (Seven states, 74 electors) (Note: Sonski on the ballot in: Alaska (3); Arkansas (6); Florida (30); Hawaii (4); Louisiana (8); Mississippi (6, as Independent); Ohio (17, as Independent)) Registered write-in (26 states, 330 electors) (Note: Sonski registered write-in in: California (54); Colorado (10); Connecticut (7); Delaware (3); Georgia (16); Idaho (4); Illinois (19); Indiana (11); Kansas (6); Kentucky (8); Maine (4); Maryland (10); Massachusetts (11); Michigan (15); Minnesota (10); Missouri (10); Nebraska (5); New York (28); North Dakota (3); Tennessee (11); Texas (40); Utah (6); Virginia (13); Washington (12); Wisconsin (10); West Virginia (4)) Automatic write-in (Nine states, 70 electors) (Note: Sonski write-in states: Alabama (9); Iowa (6); New Hampshire (4); New Jersey (14); Oregon (8); Pennsylvania (19); Rhode Island (4); Vermont (3); Wyoming (3)) Not on ballot
Independent	Shiva Ayyadurai; Entrepreneur and conspiracy theorist from Massachusetts (Note: Ayyadurai is not eligible to serve as president as he is not a natural-born citizen.)	Crystal Ellis; Entrepreneur and lawyer from Nebraska	Website September 4, 2023; FEC filings	Certified for ballot (Seven states, 57 electors) (Note: Ayyadurai on the ballot in: Idaho (4); Iowa (6); Kentucky (8); Massachusetts (11); Minnesota (10); Mississippi (6, as Independent); Washington (12)) Registered write-in (19 states + D.C., 254 electors) (Note: Ayyadurai registered write-in in: Arizona (11); Colorado (10); Connecticut (7); Delaware (3); District of Columbia (3); Florida (30); Georgia (16); Illinois (19); Kansas (6); Maine (4); Maryland (10); Missouri (10); Montana (4); New York (28); North Carolina (16); North Dakota (3); Ohio (17); Texas (40); Virginia; West Virginia (4)) Automatic write-in (Eight states, 64 electors) (Note: Ayyadurai write-in states: Alabama (9); New Hampshire (4); New Jersey (14); Oregon (8); Pennsylvania (19); Rhode Island (4); Vermont (3); Wyoming (3)) Not on ballot

=== Candidates with partial ballot access ===
The following general election candidates had ballot access to fewer than 270 electoral votes, the minimum number required to attain the presidency.

Party	Presidential nominee	Vice presidential nominee	Campaign	States with ballot access
Constitution Party (Note: The Constitution Party is listed as the U.S. Taxpayer's Party in Michigan. Constitution Party affiliates in Idaho, Nevada, Utah, and Wyoming rejected the national nominee.)	Randall Terry; Activist and perennial candidate from Tennessee	Stephen Broden; Pastor and political commentator from Texas	Website Campaign FEC filings Additional party nominations: Constitution Party of Oregon (OR) (Note: Unaffiliated with national Constitution Party); Listed as an independent in: ID	Certified for ballot (12 states, 133 electors) (Note: Terry on the ballot in: Alaska (3); Colorado (10); Florida (30); Idaho (4, as Independent); Louisiana (8); Michigan (15); Mississippi (6); New Jersey (14); North Carolina (16); Oregon (8); South Carolina (9); Wisconsin (10)) Automatic write-in (Seven states, 48 electors) (Note: Terry write-in states: Alabama (9); Iowa (6); New Hampshire (4); Pennsylvania (19); Rhode Island (4); Vermont (3); Wyoming (3)) Not on ballot Rejected by state party (Four states, 19 electors) (Note: Rejected nominee states: Idaho (4); Nevada (6); Utah (6); Wyoming (3))
Socialist Workers Party	Rachele Fruit; Hotel worker and perennial candidate from Florida	Dennis Richter (Note: Margaret Trowe was originally named the party's vice presidential nominee but withdrew due to health issues.); Activist from Minnesota	Website March 4, 2024; Listed as an independent in: TN	Certified for ballot (Six states, 58 electors) (Note: Fruit on the ballot in: Louisiana (8); Minnesota (10); New Jersey (14); Tennessee (11, as Independent); Vermont (3); Washington (12)) Automatic write-in (Seven states, 53 electors) (Note: Fruit write-in states: Alabama (9); Iowa (6); New Hampshire (4); Oregon (8); Pennsylvania (19); Rhode Island (4); Wyoming (3)) Not on ballot
Socialist Equality Party	Joseph Kishore; Writer and Socialist Equality Party National Secretary from New Jersey	Jerry White; Perennial candidate and editor from New York	Website February 27, 2024; FEC filings Listed as an independent in: MI	Certified for ballot (Three states, 41 electors) (Note: Kishore on the ballot in: Michigan (15); New Jersey (14); Washington (12)) Registered write-in (Five states, 60 electors) (Note: SEP registered write-in in: Illinois (19); Kentucky (8); Maryland (10); Minnesota (10); Virginia (13)) Automatic write-in (Eight states, 56 electors) (Note: Kishore write-in states: Alabama (9); Iowa (6); New Hampshire (4); Oregon (8); Pennsylvania (19); Rhode Island (4); Vermont (3); Wyoming (3)) Not on ballot
Independent	Richard Duncan; Perennial candidate from Ohio	Mitch Bupp; Perennial candidate from Ohio	Website	Certified for ballot (One state, 17 electors) (Note: Duncan on the ballot in: Ohio (17)) Automatic write-in (Nine states, 70 electors) (Note: Duncan write-in states: Alabama (9); Iowa (6); New Hampshire (4); New Jersey (14); Oregon (8); Pennsylvania (19); Rhode Island (4); Vermont (3); Wyoming (3)) Not on ballot
Constitution Party offshoots (Note: Constitution Party affiliates in Idaho, Nevada and Utah rejected the national nominee and nominated Skousen. The Nevada Constitution Party affiliate is listed as Independent American Party of Nevada.)	Joel Skousen; Survivalist and consultant from Utah	Rik Combs; Businessman and 2020 Libertarian nominee for governor from Missouri	Website May 6, 2024	Certified for ballot (Three states, 16 electors) (Note: Skousen on the ballot in: Idaho (4); Nevada (6); Utah (6)) Registered write-in (Two states, 23 electors) (Note: Skousen registered write-in in: Arizona (11); Washington (12)) Automatic write-in (Nine states, 70 electors) (Note: Skousen write-in states: Alabama (9); Iowa (6); New Hampshire (4); New Jersey (14); Oregon (8); Pennsylvania (19); Rhode Island (4); Vermont (3); Wyoming (3)) Not on ballot
Independent	Jay Bowman; Small business owner and activist from Kentucky	De Bowman; Activist and brother of Jay Bowman from Utah	Website July 3, 2024; FEC filings	Certified for ballot (One state, 11 electors) (Note: Bowman on the ballot in: Tennessee (11)) Registered write-in (Six states, 74 electors) (Note: Bowman registered write-in in: Georgia (16); Kentucky (8); Michigan (15); Ohio (17); Utah (6); Washington (12)) Automatic write-in (Nine states, 70 electors) (Note: Bowman write-in states: Alabama (9); Iowa (6); New Hampshire (4); New Jersey (14); Oregon (8); Pennsylvania (19); Rhode Island (4); Vermont (3); Wyoming (3)) Not on ballot
Approval Voting Party	Blake Huber; AVP nominee for President in 2020 from Colorado	Andrea Denault; Activist and political consultant from North Dakota	Website March 16, 2024	Certified for ballot (One state, 10 electors) (Note: Huber on the ballot in: Colorado (10)) Automatic write-in (Nine states, 70 electors) (Note: Huber write-in states: Alabama (9); Iowa (6); New Hampshire (4); New Jersey (14); Oregon (8); Pennsylvania (19); Rhode Island (4); Vermont (3); Wyoming (3)) Not on ballot
Godliness, Truth, Justice Party	Mattie Preston; Evangelist from Louisiana	Shannel Conner; Welder from Texas	Website January 6, 2023; FEC filings	Certified for ballot (One state, eight electors) (Note: Preston on the ballot in: Louisiana (8)) Automatic write-in (Nine states, 70 electors) (Note: Preston write-in states: Alabama (9); Iowa (6); New Hampshire (4); New Jersey (14); Oregon (8); Pennsylvania (19); Rhode Island (4); Vermont (3); Wyoming (3)) Not on ballot
Independent	Chris Garrity; Former Army Ranger and environmentalist from New Hampshire	Cody Ballard; Former Army Ranger and Assistant State Attorney from Maryland	Website June 2, 2023; FEC filings	Certified for ballot (One state, seven electors) (Note: Garrity on the ballot in: Oklahoma (7)) Registered write-in (Six states, 75 electors) (Note: Garrity registered write-in in: Colorado (10); Kansas (6); Minnesota (10); New York (28); Ohio (17); West Virginia (4)) Automatic write-in (Nine states, 70 electors) (Note: Garrity write-in states: Alabama (9); Iowa (6); New Hampshire (4); New Jersey (14); Oregon (8); Pennsylvania (19); Rhode Island (4); Vermont (3); Wyoming (3)) Not on ballot
Socialist Party USA	Bill Stodden; Nonprofit executive from Iowa	Stephanie Cholensky; Activist from Minnesota	Website November 12, 2023	Certified for ballot (One state, six electors) (Note: Stodden on the ballot in: Iowa (6)) Registered write-in (Two states, 13 electors) (Note: Stodden registered write-in in: Delaware (3); Maryland (10)) Automatic write-in (Eight states, 64 electors) (Note: Stodden write-in states: Alabama (9); New Hampshire (4); New Jersey (14); Oregon (8); Pennsylvania (19); Rhode Island (4); Vermont (3); Wyoming (3)) Not on ballot
Prohibition Party	Michael Wood; Businessman and Prohibition National Committee member from California	John Pietrowski; Prohibition National Committee member from Ohio	Website July 5, 2023; FEC filings	Certified for ballot (One state, six electors) (Note: Wood on the ballot in: Arkansas (6)) Automatic write-in (Nine states, 70 electors) (Note: Wood write-in states: Alabama (9); Iowa (6); New Hampshire (4); New Jersey (14); Oregon (8); Pennsylvania (19); Rhode Island (4); Vermont (3); Wyoming (3)) Not on ballot
Independent	Lucifer "Justin Case" Everylove; Activist from New Hampshire	N/A	Website	Certified for ballot (One state, six electors) (Note: Everylove on the ballot in: Utah (6)) Automatic write-in (Nine states, 70 electors) (Note: Everylove write-in states: Alabama (9); Iowa (6); New Hampshire (4); New Jersey (14); Oregon (8); Pennsylvania (19); Rhode Island (4); Vermont (3); Wyoming (3)) Not on ballot
Liberal Party USA	Laura Ebke; Former State Legislator from Nebraska	Trisha Butler; Chair of the Liberal Party USA and former Clarksville city councilor from Tennessee		Certified for ballot (One state, five electors) (Note: Ebke on the ballot in: New Mexico (5)) Automatic write-in (Nine states, 70 electors) (Note: Ebke write-in states: Alabama (9); Iowa (6); New Hampshire (4); New Jersey (14); Oregon (8); Pennsylvania (19); Rhode Island (4); Vermont (3); Wyoming (3)) Not on ballot Rejected by state party (One state, 11 electors) (Note: Rejected nominee states: Massachusetts (11))
Party Party	Robby Wells Former college football coach from Georgia	Tony Jones Entrepreneur and college professor from Rhode Island	Website FEC filings	Certified for ballot (One state, four electors) (Note: Wells on the ballot in: Rhode Island (4)) Registered write-in (One states, 12 electors) (Note: Wells registered write-in in: Washington (12)) Automatic write-in (Eight states, 66 electors) (Note: Wells write-in states: Alabama (9); Iowa (6); New Hampshire (4); New Jersey (14); Oregon (8); Pennsylvania (19); Vermont (3); Wyoming (3)) Not on ballot
Pirate Party	Vermin Supreme; Performance artist and perennial candidate from Massachusetts	Jonathan Realz; Actor and writer from Alabama	Website August 8, 2024; FEC filings Additional Party Nominations: Conservative Party of Delaware (DE)	Certified for ballot (One state, three electors) (Note: Supreme on the ballot in: Delaware (3, as Conservative Party)) Automatic write-in (Nine states, 70 electors) (Note: Supreme write-in states: Alabama (9); Iowa (6); New Hampshire (4); New Jersey (14); Oregon (8); Pennsylvania (19); Rhode Island (4); Vermont (3); Wyoming (3)) Not on ballot

=== Withdrawn candidates with ballot access ===
Party	Presidential nominee	Vice presidential nominee	Campaign	Withdrew	States with ballot access
Independent	Robert F. Kennedy Jr. Attorney and activist from New York	Nicole Shanahan; Attorney and technologist from California	Website Campaign FEC filings Additional party nominations: We the People Party (IA, IN, LA, MN, OR, VT, WA, WI); American Independent Party (CA); Natural Law Party of Michigan (Note: Unaffiliated with national Natural Law Party) (MI); Independent Party of Delaware (DE); Team Kennedy Party (RI)	August 23, 2024 (endorsed Trump); Withdrawn party nominations: We the People Party (HI, MA, NC, PA); Alliance Party (SC); Reform Party (FL)	Certified for ballot (30 states + D.C., 283 electors) (Note: Kennedy on the ballot in: Alabama (9); Alaska (3); Arkansas (6); California (54, as American Independent); Colorado (10); Connecticut (7); Delaware (3, as Independent Party of Delaware); District of Columbia (3); Idaho (4); Illinois (19); Indiana (11, as We The People); Iowa (6, as We The People); Kansas (6); Kentucky (8); Louisiana (8, as We The People); Maryland (10); Michigan (15, as Natural Law Party); Minnesota (10, as We The People); Mississippi (6); Montana (4); New Jersey (14); New Mexico (5); Oklahoma (7); Oregon (8, as We The People); Rhode Island (4, as Team Kennedy); South Dakota (3); Tennessee (11); Vermont (3, as We The People); Washington (12, as We The People); West Virginia (4); Wisconsin (10, as We The People)) Automatic write-in (Three states, 26 electors) (Note: Kennedy write-in states: New Hampshire (4); Pennsylvania (19, as We The People); Wyoming (3)) Not on ballot Removed name from ballot (19 states, 227 electors) (Note: Kennedy withdraws from ballot in: Arizona (11); Florida (30, as Reform Party); Georgia (16); Hawaii (4, as We The People); Maine (4); Massachusetts (11, as We The People); Missouri (10); Nebraska (5); Nevada (6); New Hampshire (4); North Carolina (16, as We The People); North Dakota (3); Ohio (17); Pennsylvania (19, as We The People); South Carolina (9, as Alliance Party); Texas (40); Utah (6); Virginia (13); Wyoming (3))

=== Candidates without ballot access ===
Parties and candidates in this section did not attain ballot access in any states, yet were running as declared write-ins in various states.

- Legal Marijuana Now Party: Dennis Schuller, small business owner;
  - Rudy Reyes, Vice-presidential nominee, archeologist and teacher
- Transhumanist Party: Tom Ross, technology and political activist;
  - Daniel Twedt, Vice-presidential nominee, nonprofit executive and perennial candidate.

Notable independents:

- Johnny Buss, co-owner of the Los Angeles Lakers
- Joseph "Afroman" Foreman, rapper
- Emanuel Pastreich, academic, think tank president

== Nominating processes ==
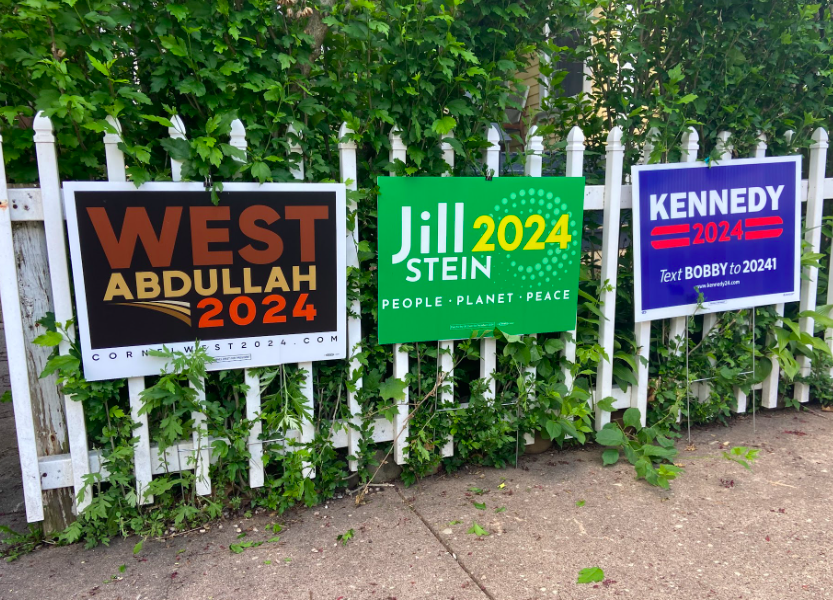
Yard signs in Southington, Connecticut promoting third-party 2024 candidates.

=== Schedule ===
Third-party nomination schedule
Date	Party nomination event
May 9, 2023	Prohibition Party presidential nominating convention
June 1, 2023	American Solidarity Party online primary
April 6, 2024	Unity Party of America nominating convention
April 13, 2024	Unity Party of Colorado (Note: Disaffiliated with Unity Party of America) nominating convention
April 17, 2024	Natural Law Party nominating convention
April 27, 2024	Constitution Party nominating convention
May 23, 2024	Reform National Convention
May 25, 2024	Constitution Party of Oregon nominating Convention
May 26, 2024	Libertarian National Convention
May 30, 2024	Approval Voting Party nominating convention
June 1, 2024	Pirate National Convention
June 23, 2024	Green Party of Alaska Nominating Meeting
August 3, 2024	Constitution Party of Idaho Nominating Convention (Note: Disaffiliated with Constitution Party)
August 3, 2024	Peace and Freedom Party state central committee meeting
August 15, 2024	Green National Convention

=== Libertarian Party ===
The Libertarian Party participated in multiple non-binding preference primaries in this election cycle. The party's presidential and vice presidential nominees were chosen directly by delegates at the 2024 Libertarian National Convention, held on Memorial Day weekend from May 24 to 26, 2024, in Washington, D.C.

Prior to the LP 2024 National Convention, 38 candidates filed with the Federal Election Commission to run for the Libertarian Party presidential nomination in 2024.

==== Nominee ====
2024 Libertarian Party nominee
Name	Born	Experience	Home state	Campaign Announcement date	Contests won	Popular vote	Running mate (Note: While the Presidential and Vice-Presidential nominations occur separately, Presidential candidates often make known their preferred Vice Presidential nominees should they receive the nomination)	Ref.
Chase Oliver	August 16, 1985 (age 41); Nashville, Tennessee	Nominee for U.S. Senator from Georgia in 2022; Candidate for GA-05 in 2020; Chair of the Atlanta Libertarian Party (2016–2017)	Georgia	Campaign website April 5, 2023; FEC filing	6 (IA, IN, AZ, OK, CT, NE)	3,498 (8.6%)	Mike ter Maat (Note: Originally was announced as Kristin Alexander)	

==== Eliminated at convention ====
This section includes candidates who filed paperwork with the Federal Election Commission with intent to run under the Libertarian Party and who met one or more of the following criteria: a) meet Wikipedia's notability guidelines; b) participated in at least three Libertarian Party-sponsored debates; or c) received non-trivial media coverage as a candidate in this election cycle.

Eliminated in convention balloting
Candidate	Born	Experience	Home state	Campaign announced Announcement date	Campaign suspended Suspension date	Contests won	Popular vote	Ref.
No preference/ None of the above/ Uncommitted	N/A				May 26, 2024 (eliminated in seventh balloting)	2 (NC, MA)	6,384 (15.7%)	
Michael; Rectenwald	January 29, 1959 (age 67); Pittsburgh, Pennsylvania	Author and Scholar; Former New York University professor (2008–2019)	Pennsylvania	August 28, 2023; FEC filing	May 26, 2024 (eliminated in sixth balloting)	2 (MS, AL)	943 (2.3%)	
Mike ter Maat	June 20, 1961 (age 65); Portland, Oregon	Economist; Former Hallandale Beach, Florida police officer Nominee for FL-20 in 2022	Virginia	April 18, 2022; FEC filing	May 26, 2024 (eliminated during fifth balloting; endorsed Oliver during balloting) (ran for vice-president)	1 (PA)	589 (1.5%)	
Lars Mapstead	August 14, 1969 (age 57); Monterey, California	Co-founder of Friend Finder Networks; Founder of Fupa Games and Legendary Speed	California	March 23, 2021; FEC filing Running mate: Larry Sharpe	May 26, 2024 (eliminated during fourth balloting; endorsed Oliver after his nomination)	2 (ME, NM)	1,222 (3.0%)	
Joshua Smith	March 13, 1983 (age 43); Antioch, California	Vice Chair of the Libertarian National Committee (2022–2023)	Iowa	July 24, 2023; FEC filing	May 26, 2024 (eliminated during third balloting)	1 (MN)	416 (1.0%)	
Jacob Hornberger	January 28, 1950 (age 76); Laredo, Texas	Founder and President of the Future of Freedom Foundation; Independent candidate for U.S. Senate from Virginia in 2002; Candidate for President in 2000 and 2020	Virginia	February 20, 2023; FEC filing	May 26, 2024 (eliminated during second balloting)	0	2,043 (5.0%)	
Charles Ballay	January 1, 1970 (age 56); New Orleans, Louisiana	Otolaryngologist	Louisiana	August 24, 2023; FEC filing	May 26, 2024 (eliminated during initial balloting; endorsed Oliver after his nomination)	1 (CA)	22,337 (55.1%)	
Art Olivier	August 24, 1957 (age 69); Lynwood, California	Nominee for U.S. Vice President in 2000; Nominee for Governor of California in 2006; Mayor of Bellflower, California (1998–1999)	California	December 11, 2023; FEC filing	May 26, 2024 (eliminated during initial balloting)	0	5 (nil%)	

==== Withdrew before the primaries ====
Former candidates in the 2024 Libertarian Party presidential primaries
Name	Born	Experience	Home state	Campaign announced	Campaign suspended	Campaign	Ref.
Joe Exotic	March 5, 1963 (age 60); Garden City, Kansas	Businessman and media personality Owner of the Greater Wynnewood Exotic Animal Park (1998–2018); Independent candidate for president in 2016; Candidate for Governor of Oklahoma in 2018	Texas	March 10, 2023	April 11, 2023 (ran for the Democratic nomination)	FEC filing	

=== Green Party ===
The Green Party held a series of presidential primaries through which convention delegates were awarded to candidates and nominated the party's presidential ticket at the 2024 Green National Convention, which took place as a virtual event from August 15 to 18, 2024.

The individuals listed below are declared candidates who have filed paperwork with the Federal Election Commission with intent to run under the Green Party and who meet one or more of the following criteria: a) meet Wikipedia's notability guidelines; b) have participated (or have been invited to participate) in at least two Green Party-sponsored debates or c) have received non-trivial media coverage as a candidate in this election cycle.

Green nominee for the 2024 presidential election
Name	Born	Experience	Home state	Campaign Announcement date	Contests won	Delegates	Popular vote	Running mate	Ref.
Jill Stein	May 14, 1950 (age 76); Chicago, Illinois	Nominee for president in 2012 and 2016; Member of the Lexington Town Meeting from the 2nd Precinct; Activist	Massachusetts	Campaign; November 9, 2023; FEC filing	20 (KS, PA, CA, IL, AZ, NY, WA, NV, TX, WI, CT, TN, OH, MD, NJ, NM, UT, WV, IN, DC)	Pledged: 182 (91.9%); Convention: 267 (91.1%)	16,597 (96.5%)	Butch Ware	

Other candidates in the 2024 Green Party presidential primaries
Name	Born	Experience	Home state	Campaign Announcement date	Contests won	Delegates	Popular vote	Running mate	Ref.
Other candidates formally recognized by GPUS
Jasmine Sherman	August 17, 1985 (age 41); Queens, New York	Executive Director of Greater Charlotte Rise	North Carolina	February 18, 2022; FEC filing	None	Pledged: 10 (5.1%); Convention: 13 (4.5%)	72 (0.4%)	Tanda Blubear	
Jorge Zevala	unknown	Businessman	California	October 13, 2023; FEC filing	None	None	18 (0.1%)		
Alternate ballot options:
None of the above	N/A				1 (MT)	Pledged: 6 (2.5%); Convention: 10 (3.4%)	505 (2.9%)		

=== Constitution Party ===
The Constitution Party held its presidential nominating convention on April 24–27, 2024, in Salt Lake City, Utah.

Eight candidates sought the nomination:

- Daniel Clyde Cummings, perennial candidate from Wyoming
- Louis C. Hook from Mississippi
- Brandon McIntyre from Georgia
- Joel Skousen, author and survivalist from Utah
- Ben Stewart
- Randall Terry, author, anti-abortion activist, and Democratic candidate for president in 2012 from Tennessee
- Samm Tittle, perennial candidate
- Paul Venable, nominee for U.S. Senator from Missouri in 2022

Jim Harvey of Georgia (who ultimately did not seek the nomination), Joel Skousen, and Randall Terry participated in an April 6 debate in Dearborn, Michigan.

Terry won the nomination by securing a majority in the first round. The votes largely broke down along geographic lines. Skousen, who is from Utah, received all 61 votes from the delegations of the Four Corners states, but only 19 votes from the rest of the country combined. The only state delegations he carried outside of the region were New Hampshire and West Virginia. Venable won the majority of votes from South Carolina and his home state of Missouri and Daniel Cummings won a plurality in his home state of Wyoming. The remaining ten delegations were all won by Terry.

Pastor and political commentator Stephen Broden, who was running on a ticket with Terry, received the vice presidential nomination via voice vote.

Aside from the presidential nomination, much of the debate at the convention focused on an ultimately defeated amendment by Skousen to remove references to God from the party platform.

2024 Constitution Party Presidential Nomination Vote
Candidate	Votes	Percentage			
Candidate	Votes	Percentage	Randall Terry	144	54.55%
Joel Skousen	80	30.30%			
Paul Venable	32	12.12%			
Daniel Cummings	4	1.52%			
Brandon McIntyre	2	0.76%			
Samm Tittle	2	0.76%			
Louis C. Hook	0	0.00%			
Ben Stewart	0	0.00%			
Total:	264	100.00%			

Constitution Party vice presidential nomination
Candidate	Votes	Percentage		
Candidate	Votes	Percentage	Stephen Broden	Nominated via Voice Vote

The Constitution Party received 60,023 votes in the 2020 election.

The Nevada, Utah and Idaho state parties split from the national party and nominated Skousen.

=== American Independent Party ===
The American Independent Party held a non-binding presidential preference primary in California on March 5, 2024. James Bradley was the only candidate listed on the ballot and defeated Andrew George Rummel, who was a recognized write-in candidate.

2024 California American Independent primary
Candidate	Votes	Percentage			
Candidate	Votes	Percentage	James Bradley	45,565	99.96%
Andrew George Rummel (write-in)	16	0.04%			
Total:	45,581	100.0%			

On April 29, 2024, the party announced that it had nominated independent presidential candidate Robert F. Kennedy Jr.

=== Legal Marijuana Now Party ===
The Legal Marijuana Now Party held its first-ever presidential nomination primary in Minnesota on Super Tuesday, March 5. This was the first presidential primary to be held in Minnesota for a third party since 1916. Krystal Gabel withdrew from the race during Legal Marijuana Now Party's candidate filing discussions. When Gabel asked to be removed from the ballot, after early voting had started on January 19, 2024, the Minnesota Secretary of State's office stated that changes cannot be made to the list of candidates after the list was certified 63 days prior to the election, and Gabel's name remained on ballots.

Five candidates appeared on the ballot:

- Edward Forchion, activist, and candidate for governor of New Jersey in 2021
- Rudy Reyes, archeologist, and national LMN Party chairperson
- Dennis Schuller, Minnesota LMN Party chairperson; former Richfield, Minnesota, municipal planning commission member (2008–2014)
- Vermin Supreme, performance artist, activist, and perennial candidate from Massachusetts; former Libertarian Party Judicial Committee member (2020–2022) (Also running for the Democratic nomination)
- Krystal Gabel, activist, and candidate for governor of Nebraska in 2018 (Withdrew January 26, 2024)

Of Minnesota's three major political parties, all of which included a write in option for their 2024 nominating primaries, only the Legal Marijuana Now party submitted to the Secretary of State a write in name to be counted, singer-songwriter Willie Nelson. Minnesota presidential delegates to the national party convention were awarded proportionally based on the primary results.

Minnesota Legal Marijuana Now primary, March 5, 2024
Candidate	Votes	Percentage	Delegates				
Candidate	Votes	Percentage	Delegates	Krystal Gabel (withdrawn)	759	28.84%	-
Dennis Schuller	459	17.44%	7				
Vermin Supreme	397	15.08%	6				
Rudy Reyes	365	13.87%	5				
Edward Forchion	168	6.38%	2				
Willie Nelson (write-in)	19	0.72%	0				
Other write-ins	465	17.67%	-				
Total:	2,632	100.00%	20				

Gabel won a plurality of the vote (28.8%), but withdrew ahead of the primary. Of declared candidates, Richfield, Minnesota businessman Dennis Schuller finished in the lead, with 17.4%. At the state convention in Caledonia on May 8, Minnesota presidential delegates to the national Legal Marijuana Now convention were awarded proportionally based on the primary results. However, the party lost automatic ballot access in a May 2024 ruling by the Minnesota Supreme Court, meaning party officials and candidates would have to petition for ballot access.

The party was also ballot-qualified in Nebraska, but no candidates qualified for the May 14 primary. Instead, the state affiliate party nominated Cornel West. Because Minnesota is a more populous state than Nebraska, Minnesota LMNP delegates to the national convention that were pledged to Schuller and California archeologist Rudy Reyes outnumbered the entire Nebraska delegation which voted unanimously for West. At the July 6 national convention held in Bloomington, Minnesota, Schuller and running mate Reyes were nominated for the presidential ticket. The 2024 LMNP write-in campaign was certified in several states.

=== Peace and Freedom Party ===
==== Peace and Freedom primary ====
The Peace and Freedom Party held a non-binding preference primary in California on Super Tuesday, March 5. Claudia De la Cruz, the nominee of the Party for Socialism and Liberation, won the primary with a plurality, defeating Jasmine Sherman and Cornel West. The party's presidential nominee, chosen by the state central committee in August, is Claudia De la Cruz.

2024 California Peace and Freedom primary
Candidate	Votes	Percentage			
Candidate	Votes	Percentage	Claudia De la Cruz	6,430	47.0%
Cornel West	5,455	39.9%			
Jasmine Sherman	1,795	13.1%			
Total:	13,680	100.0%			

After the results of the primary, the state executive committee of the Peace and Freedom Party of California voted to deem De La Cruz to be the party's presumptive nominee ahead of its nominating convention convention. The committee reached this decision due to two factors. The first was after determining that the size of her lead in the primary indicated that she would "almost certainly" have the support from party members to secure the nomination in the convention's balloting.

==== Peace and Freedom nominating convention ====
On August 3, 2024, the Peace and Freedom Party of California officially selected De La Cruz as its nominee at its nominating convention. The convention was held simultaneously in two California cities: Los Angeles and Oakland. Voting at the convention were members of the Peace and Freedom Party State Central Committee, who served as delegates at the convention. Members of the party's state central committee had been elected by the registered voters of the party in March 2024. The convention vote was participated in by 99 delegates hailing from seventeen of California's counties. The convention was a hybrid event, in which delegates were able to and vote either in-person at either convention site, or alternatively could attend and vote attend virtually (electronic voting). The party described De La Cruz's lead in the convention balloting as "overwhelming".

=== American Solidarity Party ===
The American Solidarity Party announced on June 2, 2023, that Peter Sonski had won their party's online primary, which lasted from May 24 to June 1. Sonski was nominated in the first round of ranked-choice voting with 52%. Sonski then selected Lauren Onak as his vice president, who was then officially nominated via unanimous consent.

American Solidarity Party presidential nomination
Candidate	Votes	Percentage			
Candidate	Votes	Percentage	Peter Sonski	328	52.5%
Jacqueline Abernathy	207	33.1			
Joe Schriner	50	8.0			
Larry Johnson	24	3.8			
Erskine Levi	16	2.6			
Total:	625	100.00%			

American Solidarity Party vice presidential nomination
Candidate	Votes	Percentage		
Candidate	Votes	Percentage	Lauren Onak	Nominated via Unanimous Consent

=== Approval Voting Party ===
The Approval Voting Party received 409 votes for president in 2020. It was only ballot-approved in Colorado. On March 16, the party nominated Blake Huber for president and Andrea Denault for vice president.

=== Green Mountain Peace and Justice ===
The Green Mountain Peace and Justice Party is a regional ballot-qualified party in Vermont which has regularly nominated candidates for president since 1972. It nominated Gloria La Riva, the PSL nominee, in 2020. She received 166 votes in Vermont. On April 28, the party nominated independent candidate Cornel West for president.

=== Natural Law Party ===
The Michigan Natural Law Party held its nominating convention on April 17, 2024, where it nominated independent candidate Robert F. Kennedy Jr. for President and Nicole Shanahan for Vice President. Party chairman Doug Dern claimed fellow independent candidate Cornel West also sought the party's ballot access. Kennedy later attempted to remove his name from the ballot in Michigan, but was blocked in courts.

In 2020, the Michigan party nominated Alliance Party nominee Rocky De La Fuente, who received 2,986 votes in Michigan.

The party was also presidential ballot-qualified in Florida. The Florida party did not nominate a candidate in the 2020 or the 2024 election.

=== Prohibition Party ===
The Prohibition Party held its presidential nominating convention on May 8–9, 2023, in Buffalo, New York. Three candidates stood for nomination; Michael Wood was nominated on the first ballot.

Prohibition Party presidential nomination
Candidate	Votes	Percentage			
Candidate	Votes	Percentage	Michael Wood	8	61.5%
Zack Kusnir	4	30.8%			
Scott Baier	0	0.0%			
Jay Rockefeller (write-in)	1	7.7%			
Total:	13	100.00%			

Prohibition Party vice presidential nomination
Candidate	Votes	Percentage		
Candidate	Votes	Percentage	John Petrowski	Nominated via Unanimous Consent

=== Unity Party ===
The Bill Hammons-led faction of the Unity Party of America nominated Paul Noel Fiorino and Matthew May for president and vice president respectively at the 7th United National Convention over Google Meet on April 6, 2024.

However, the Colorado faction of the party, which was the only state party with ballot access, met on April 13, 2024, and nominated independent candidate Cornel West for president and his running mate, Melina Abdullah for vice president.

Unity Party of Colorado Presidential Nomination
Candidate	Percentage		
Candidate	Percentage	Cornel West	95%
Paul Noel Fiorino	5%		
Total:	100.00%		

Withdrew before convention:

- Bill Hammons, co-founder and chairman of the Unity Party; 2020 nominee for president
- Donnie Harold Harris, business owner and write-in candidate for the 2012 Indiana gubernatorial election

The party was only ballot-approved in Colorado. In 2020, party co-founder Bill Hammons was on the ballot in three states and received 6,647 votes.

=== Alliance Party ===
The Alliance Party received 88,236 votes for president in 2020. It and its affiliates were ballot-qualified in Alaska, Connecticut, and South Carolina.

The Alliance Party of South Carolina nominated Independent Robert F. Kennedy Jr. for its ballot line, but he later withdrew his name from the ballot in South Carolina.

=== Green Party of Alaska ===
The Green Party of Alaska is unaffiliated with the Green Party of the United States and was not ballot-qualified in Alaska. The party nominated Jesse Ventura for president in 2020 and received 2,673 votes.

Jasmine Sherman and Tanda BluBear were nominated for president and vice president, respectively.

The party hosted a series of debates featuring the following candidates seeking the nomination:

- Joseph "Afroman" Foreman, rapper and independent write-in candidate for president;
- Brittany Jones, veteran and unaffiliated write-in candidate for president from Oregon;
- Jasmine Sherman, executive director of Greater Charlotte Rise and candidate in 2024 Green Party presidential primaries, from North Carolina;
- Dashaun "Daví" Davis, activist and candidate for the Green Party presidential nomination;
- Emanuel Pastreich, president of the Asia Institute, academic, author, and withdrawn candidate for the Green Party presidential nomination, from Massachusetts;
- Rollan Roberts, businessman and candidate in 2024 Republican presidential primaries;
- Jay Torres, candidate for Republican presidential nomination;
- Wayne Pope, veteran and candidate in 2024 Democratic Party presidential primaries;
- Suzzanna Tanner, independent write-in candidate for president;
- Susan Buchser-Lochocki, voting rights activist and unregistered write-in candidate for president;

=== Liberal Party ===
The Liberal Party, formerly the Association of State Liberty Parties, has qualified state parties in Massachusetts and New Mexico which were, until 2022, affiliated with the national Libertarian Party. These parties received a combined 59,598 votes in 2020.

The Libertarian Association of Massachusetts provided its ballot line to the national Libertarian Party nominees, Chase Oliver and Mike ter Maat. The Libertarian Party of New Mexico ran Laura Ebke and Trisha Butler, the Liberal Party Chair on its ballot line, without any campaign.

=== Cascade Party ===
The Cascade Party petitioned to place Krist Novoselić and James Carroll on the ballot in Washington, as that is a requirement to gain state recognition of a new party. Novoselić later withdrew his name from the ballot.

== Declined to be candidates ==
=== No Labels ===
The following individuals had declined to be candidates for the No Labels unity ticket. On April 4, 2024, the organization announced it would not run a presidential campaign.

- Andy Beshear, Governor of Kentucky (2019–present), Attorney General of Kentucky (2016–2019) (initially endorsed Biden and later endorsed Harris)
- Bill Cassidy, U.S. Senator from Louisiana (2015–present)
- Chris Christie, former Governor of New Jersey (2010–2018), Republican candidate for president in 2016 and 2024
- Nikki Haley, former U.S. Ambassador to the United Nations (2017–2018) and Governor of South Carolina (2011–2017) (ran as a Republican and later endorsed Trump)
- Larry Hogan, former Governor of Maryland (2015–2023) (endorsed Haley; running for U.S. Senate)
- Jon Huntsman Jr., U.S. Ambassador to Russia (2017–2019), U.S. Ambassador to China (2009–2011), Governor of Utah (2005–2009), Republican candidate for president in 2012
- Will Hurd, U.S. Representative from TX-23 (2015–2021) (ran as a Republican; endorsed Haley)
- Joe Manchin, U.S. Senator from West Virginia (2010–2025), Governor of West Virginia (2005–2010), West Virginia Secretary of State (2001–2005)
- William H. McRaven, Commander of the United States Special Operations Command (2011–2014) and Chancellor of the University of Texas System (2015–2018)
- Pat McCrory, former Governor of North Carolina (2013–2017), Mayor of Charlotte, North Carolina (1995–2009), candidate for U.S. Senator from North Carolina in 2022
- David Petraeus, Director of the Central Intelligence Agency (2011–2012), commander of the International Security Assistance Force (2010–2011), commander of United States Central Command (2008–2010)
- Dean Phillips, U.S. Representative from MN-03 (2019–2025) and CEO of Phillips Distilling Company (2000–2012) (ran as a Democrat; initially endorsed Biden and later endorsed Harris)
- Condoleezza Rice, United States Secretary of State (2005–2009) and United States National Security Advisor (2001–2005)
- Mitt Romney, U.S. Senator from Utah (2019–2025), Governor of Massachusetts (2003–2007), Republican candidate for president in 2008 and nominee in 2012
- Kyrsten Sinema, U.S. Senator from Arizona (2019–2025), U.S. Representative from AZ-09 (2013–2019)
- Chris Sununu, Governor of New Hampshire (2017–2025) (initially endorsed Haley and later endorsed Trump)
- Andrew Yang, co-chair of the Forward Party (2022–present), Democratic candidate for president in 2020 and for mayor of New York City in 2021 (Initially endorsed Phillips, later endorsed Harris)

=== Third party ===
The following notable individuals were the subject of speculation about their possible candidacies, but had publicly denied interest in running.

- Justin Amash, former United States Representative from MI-03 (2011–2021), member of the Michigan House of Representatives from the 72nd district (2009–2011) (ran for U.S. Senate)
- Mark Cuban, investor and entrepreneur (initially endorsed Biden and later endorsed Harris)
- Jamie Dimon, chairman and CEO of JPMorgan Chase
- Howie Hawkins, co-founder of the Green Party and Green/Socialist nominee for president in 2020
- Dwayne Johnson, actor, businessman and professional wrestler
- Vivek Ramaswamy, executive chairman of Strive Asset Management (2022–2023) and CEO of Roivant Sciences (2014–2021) (ran as a Republican; endorsed Trump)
- Dave Smith, stand-up comedian, libertarian political commentator, podcaster

== Debates and forums ==
2024 Free & Equal debates
No.	Date & Time	Location	Participants								
P Participant A Absent invitee I Invitee N Not invited W Withdrawn NYD Not yet declared			Democratic	Republican	Independent	Libertarian	Green	Independent	PSL	Constitution	Others
P Participant A Absent invitee I Invitee N Not invited W Withdrawn NYD Not yet declared			Kamala Harris	Donald Trump	Robert F. Kennedy Jr.	Chase Oliver	Jill Stein	Cornel West	Claudia De la Cruz	Randall Terry	See notes
1	February 29, 2024	New York City	NYD	N	A	P	P	A	P	N	P (Note: Lars Mapstead, who was seeking the Libertarian nomination at the time, and Jasmine Sherman, who was seeking the Green nomination at the time, also participated.)
2	July 12, 2024	Las Vegas	NYD	A	A	P	P	A	N	P	A (Note: Joe Biden, who was the presumptive Democratic nominee at the time of the debate, was invited to attend but declined.)
3	October 23, 2024	Hollywood	A	A	W	P	P	A	A	P	N

=== February 29 debate (New York City) ===
The Free & Equal Elections Foundation hosted a multiparty debate on February 29, 2024, in New York City, New York moderated by Caitlin Sinclair, Jason Palmer and Christina Tobin. Socialism and Liberation nominee Claudia De la Cruz, Libertarian candidates Chase Oliver and Lars Mapstead, and Green candidates Jill Stein and Jasmine Sherman attended. Independent candidates Robert F. Kennedy Jr. and Cornel West were also invited but did not attend.

2nd Free and Equal Presidential debate
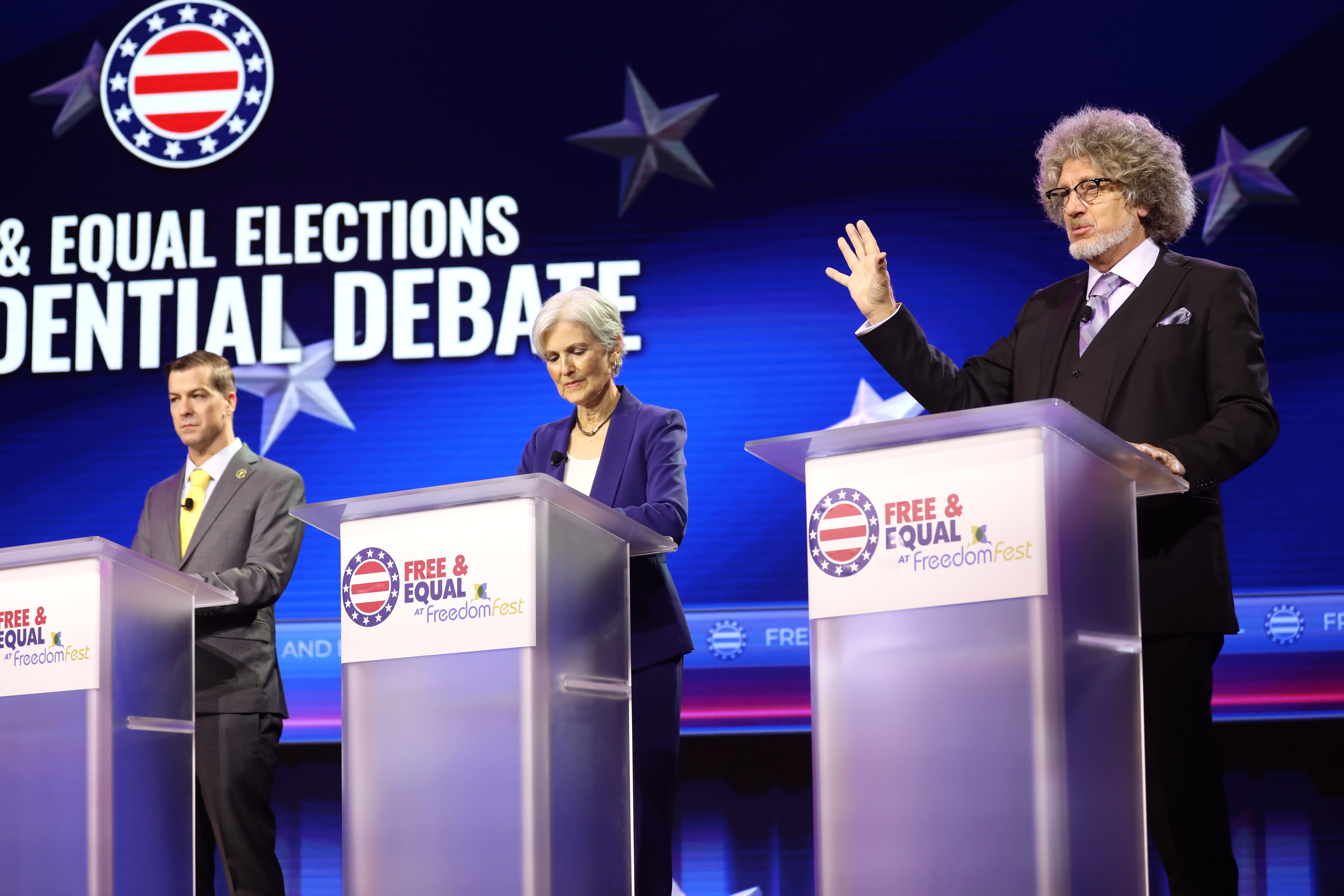
- From left to right: Oliver, Stein, and Terry
- Date(s): July 12, 2024
- Duration: c. 1 hour and 50 minutes
- Location: Las Vegas, Nevada
- Participants: Chase Oliver; Jill Stein; Randall Terry
- Footage: Archived July 16, 2024, at the Wayback Machine
- Moderator(s): Christina Tobin and Thomas Massie

=== July 12 debate (Las Vegas) ===
Free and Equal hosted a second debate on July 12, 2024, at FreedomFest in Las Vegas, Nevada moderated by the foundation's chair, Christina Tobin and congressman Thomas Massie.

Candidates invited to the debate were: Biden, Kennedy, Oliver, Stein, Terry, Trump, and West. Oliver, Stein, and Terry participated.

=== October 23 debate (Hollywood) ===
A third debate was scheduled for September 18 in Los Angeles, but it was cancelled and rescheduled for October. Oliver, Stein, and Terry participated in the October 23 debate.

=== Forums ===
The Muslim Civic Coalition hosted a forum featuring Jill Stein and Cornel West on February 3 in Oak Brook, Illinois. The organization claimed all presidential candidates were invited to attend.

The Abandon Biden movement held an online forum on June 13 featuring Jill Stein, Cornel West, and Claudia de la Cruz focused on promoting "pro-Palestine" candidates for President.

== Polling ==
=== Aggregate polls ===
This table will only include polling aggregates that track at least one third-party candidate.

Poll source	Since	As of	Kamala Harris DEM	Donald Trump GOP	Robert F. Kennedy Jr IND (Note: including several other parties)	Jill Stein GRN	Cornel West IND (Note: including several other parties)	Margin
538	July 24, 2024	August 9, 2024	45.5%	43.4%	5.1%	–	–	Harris +2.0%
RCP	July 22, 2024	August 9, 2024	45.3%	44.5%	5.5%	0.9%	0.6%	Harris +0.8%
TH/DDHQ	July 7, 2024	August 9, 2024	46.7%	43.5%	3.4%	–	–	Harris +3.2%
SB	July 1, 2024	August 9, 2024	46.3%	43.9%	4.1%	–	–	Harris +2.4%
RTTWH	July 8, 2024	August 9, 2024	45.7%	43.5%	5.4%	0.8%	0.5%	Harris +2.2%
NYT	July 17, 2024	August 9, 2024	45%	43%	5%	–	–	Harris +2%

== See also ==
- 2024 Republican Party presidential candidates
- 2024 Democratic Party presidential candidates
- 2024 United States presidential election
- Timeline of the 2024 United States presidential election
