= List of Jill Stein 2024 presidential campaign endorsements =

Jill Stein for President
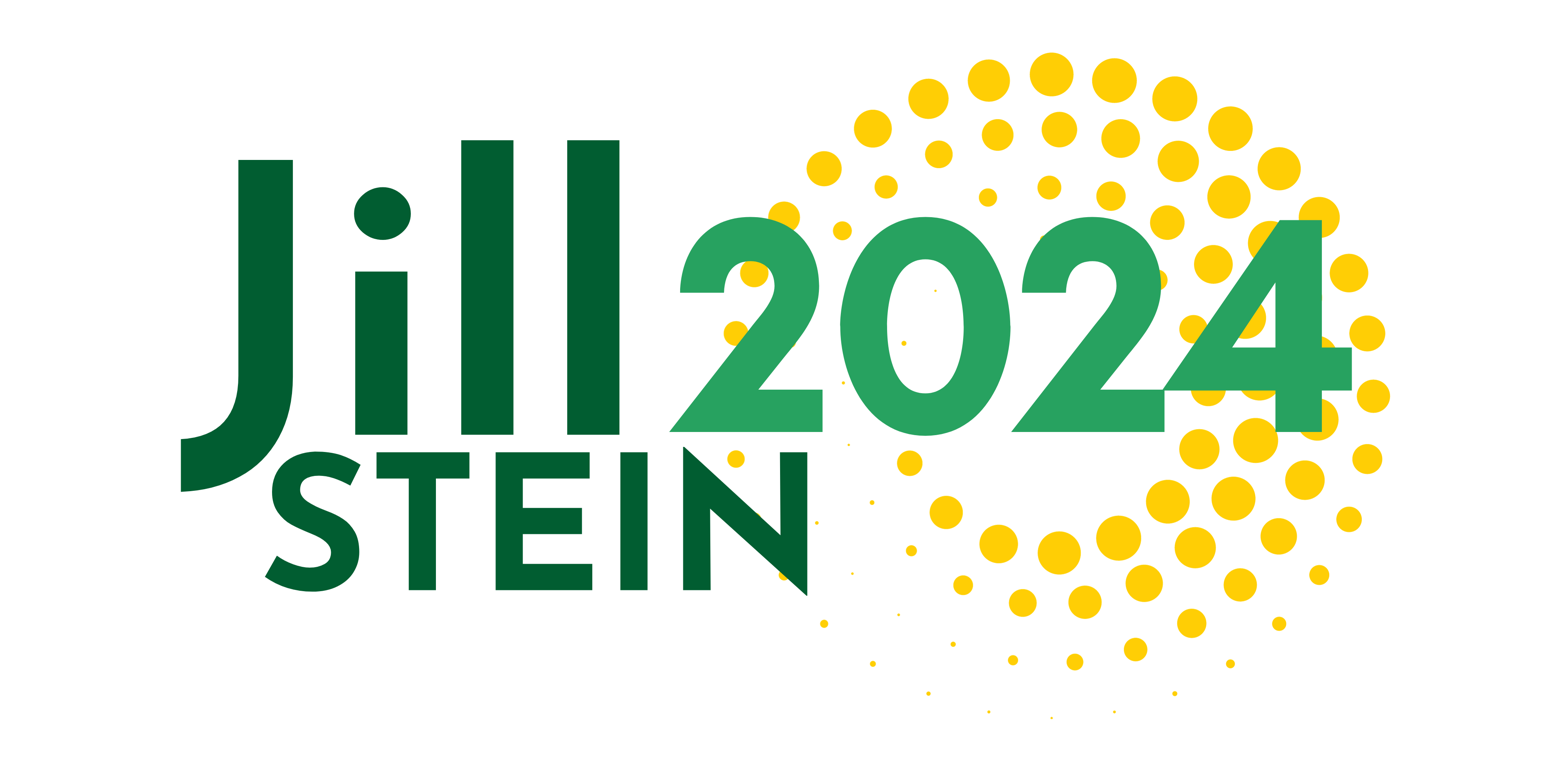
- Campaign: U.S. presidential election, 2024
- Candidate: Jill Stein; Former member of the Lexington; Town Meeting from the 2nd district (2005–2011); Butch Ware; Historian and activist
- Affiliation: Green Party
- Headquarters: Brooklyn, New York

Website
- www.jillstein2024.com

This is a list of notable individuals and organizations who have voiced their endorsement of the Green Party's presidential nominee Jill Stein for the 2024 presidential election.

== Elected officials and public officeholders ==
- David Duke, former member of the Louisiana House of Representatives (1989-1992) and former Grand Wizard of the KKK (Republican) (Repudiated by Stein)
- Kshama Sawant, former Seattle City Council member (2014–2024) (Revolutionary Workers)

== Public figures ==
- Tariq Ali, activist, writer and public intellectual
- Medea Benjamin, co-founder of Code Pink
- Caitlin Durante, American writer and comedian
- Jeffrey Sachs, American economist and public policy analyst who is a professor at Columbia University
- Roger Waters, musician (co-endorsed with Joseph Kishore and Cornel West)
- Huwaida Arraf, co-founder of International Solidarity Movement

== International officials ==
- Jean-Luc Mélenchon, member of the National Assembly from the Bouches-du-Rhône's 4th constituency (2017–2022) (La France Insoumise, co-endorsed Kamala Harris)

== Organizations ==
- American Arab and Muslim Political Action Committee
- Council on American–Islamic Relations Action (co-endorsed with Claudia De la Cruz, Joseph Kishore, and Cornel West)
- Muslim American Public Affairs Council
- Abandon Harris

=== Political parties ===
- Green Party of the United States
- Georgia Green Party (formerly affiliated to the GPUS)
- Kentucky Party
- Socialist Alternative
