= USLP =

USLP may refer to:

- U.S. Labor Party (founded 1972)
- Labor Party (United States, 1996) (founded 1996)
- United States Libertarian Party
- Liberty Party (1840s)
- Liberty Party (1930s)
