= Claudia De la Cruz 2024 presidential campaign =

- Campaign: 2024 United States presidential election
- Candidate: Claudia De la Cruz; Karina Garcia
- Announced: September 7, 2023
- Launched: September 8, 2023

Website
- https://votesocialist2024.com/

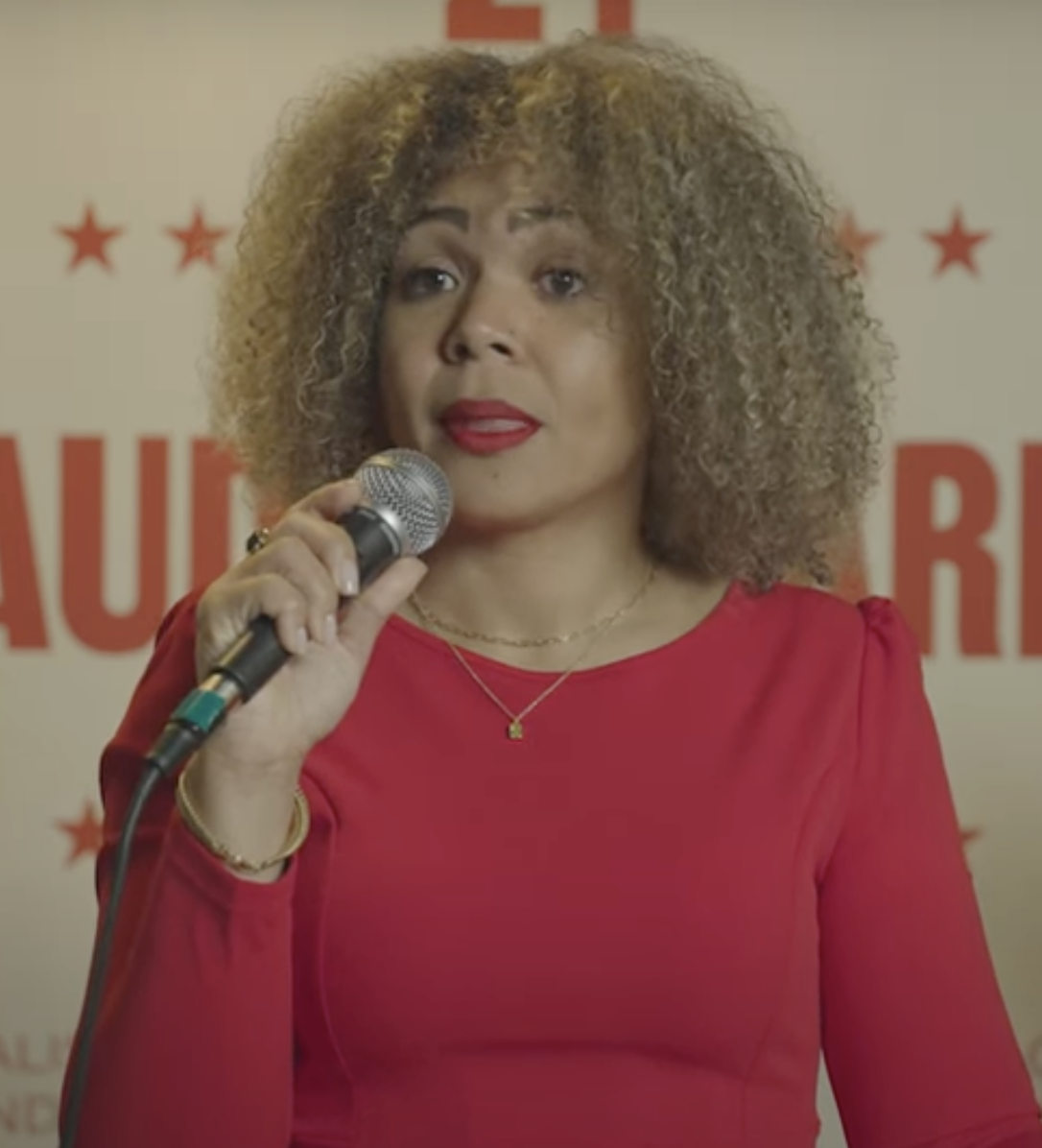
De la Cruz in 2024

Claudia De la Cruz, a leftist activist from New York, announced her 2024 campaign for president of the United States on September 7, 2023. She and running mate Karina Garcia formed the presidential ticket for the Party for Socialism and Liberation (PSL), a communist party, in the 2024 U.S. presidential election.

De la Cruz received 167,772 votes (0.11%). De la Cruz nearly doubled the PSL's 2020 total, and won the most votes received by a candidate running on an explicitly socialist presidential ticket since the Socialist Party's Norman Thomas in 1936.

== Platform ==
Their platform included a pledge to support reparations for Black Americans, institute a single-payer healthcare system, end all U.S. aid to Israel, forgive all student loan debt, fully recognize Native American sovereignty and honor treaty rights, cut the U.S. military budget by 90%, nationalize the 100 largest corporations, expand public transportation, and use taxation to eliminate extra-billionaire incomes in favor of the working class.

== Ballot access ==
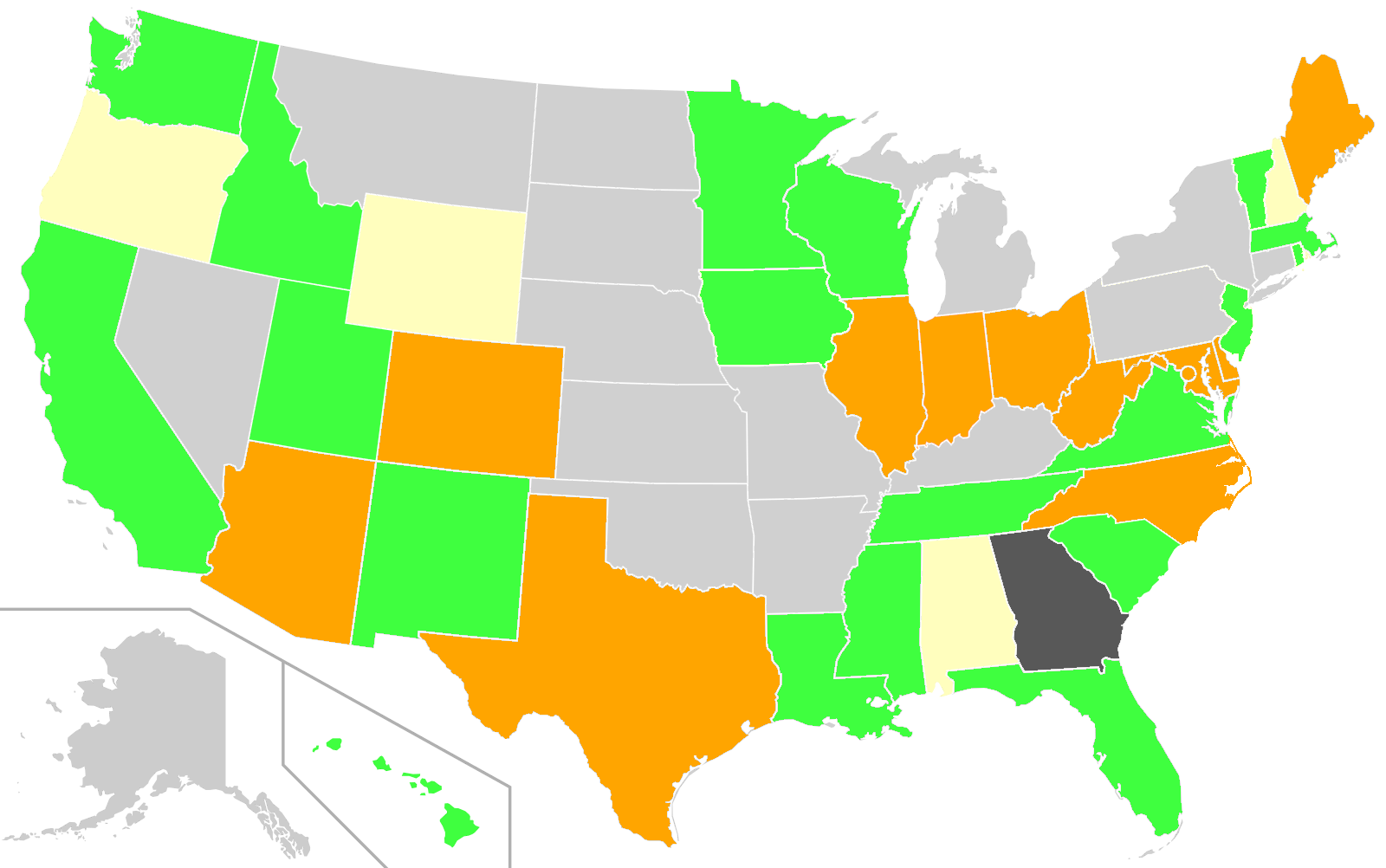
Certified for ballot (19 states, 220 electors) (Note: De la Cruz on the ballot in: California (54, as Peace and Freedom Party); Florida (30); Hawaii (4); Idaho (4); Iowa (6); Louisiana (8); Massachusetts (11); Minnesota (10); Mississippi (6, as Independent); New Jersey (14); New Mexico (5); Rhode Island (4); South Carolina (9, as South Carolina Workers Party); Tennessee (11, as Independent); Utah (6, as Independent); Vermont (3); Virginia (13, as Independent); Washington (12); Wisconsin (10)) Registered write-in (14 states, 184 electors) (Note: De la Cruz registered write-in in: Arizona (11); Colorado (10); Delaware (3); District of Columbia (3); Illinois (19); Indiana (11); Kentucky (8); Maine (4); Maryland (10); New York (28); North Carolina (16); Ohio (17); Texas (40); West Virginia (4)) Automatic write-in (Four states, 24 electors) (Note: De la Cruz write-in states: Alabama (9); New Hampshire (4); Oregon (8); Wyoming (3)) On ballot, votes will not count (Two states, 35 electors) (Note: De la Cruz disqualified states: Georgia (16); Pennsylvania (19)) Not on ballot

The Party for Socialism and Liberation attained ballot access in Florida, Georgia, Louisiana, Minnesota, New Jersey, New Mexico, Vermont, and Washington. In addition, De la Cruz received ballot lines from the Peace and Freedom Party in California, the South Carolina Workers Party, and has filed as unaffiliated in Utah.

During the 2024 election, Democrats often worked to keep De la Cruz along with other left-wing third-party candidates such as Cornel West off of ballots, while Republicans often intervened to keep De la Cruz and West on ballots.

== Events ==
On February 29, 2024, De la Cruz participated in a presidential candidates debate hosted by the Free & Equal Elections Foundation, alongside Green Party candidates Jill Stein and Jasmine Sherman, and Libertarian Party candidates Chase Oliver and Lars Mapstead.

In March 2024, the South Carolina Workers Party voted to place De la Cruz and Garcia on the state ballot for president and vice president.

In June 2024, De la Cruz gave a speech at a pro-Palestine protest that surrounded the White House.

== Reception ==
=== Endorsements ===
Claudia De la Cruz

Individuals

- Earl Ofari Hutchinson, author

Political parties

- Peace and Freedom Party
- South Carolina Workers Party

=== Criticism ===
David Corn criticized the PSL for its support of the North Korean regime, defending the human rights record of the Chinese Communist Party and for a founder as well as a two-time vice presidential candidate both working for Radio Sputnik, a Russian propaganda subsidiary of Russia Today. Corn also cited close funding ties for affiliated organizations to Neville Roy Singham, a Shanghai-based multi-millionaire philanthropist that the New York Times linked as a major funder of nonprofits and media outlets promoting pro-Beijing talking points.

== See also ==
- Gaza war protest vote movements
