= Labor Party (United States, 1996) =

Democratic socialist political party in the United States

- Founded: 1996; 30 years ago
- Dissolved: 2007; 19 years ago
- Succeeded by: South Carolina Workers Party
- Ideology: Democratic socialism; Labourism; Left-wing populism; Progressivism; Social democracy; Trade unionism
- Political position: Left-wing

Website
- thelaborparty.org

The Labor Party (LP) was a social democratic political party in the United States of America. LP formed at a national convention of unions and labor activists in 1996.

The LP collapsed after its founder, Tony Mazzocchi, died in 2002. The party became defunct in 2007, except for the branch in South Carolina, which became the South Carolina Workers Party.

== History ==
=== Origins ===
In 1989, members of Socialist Alternative in AFSCME created the Campaign for a Labor Party (CLP). CLP meetings persuaded Mazzochi that enough support existed in unions for a labor party, and he created Labor Party Advocates in 1990.

The Labor Party was officially formed in 1996 by the Oil, Chemical, and Atomic Workers International Union, United Electrical, Radio and Machine Workers of America, United Mine Workers, International Longshore and Warehouse Union, American Federation of Government Employees, Brotherhood of Maintenance of Way Employes, California Nurses Association, Farm Labor Organizing Committee and hundreds of other local labor unions. Delegates to the founding convention adopted a 16-point program called "A Call for Economic Justice."

=== Fissures ===
From the beginning a dispute over the Party's running of candidates arose with many of the official unions totally opposed to running candidates that might cause the defeat of their normal Democratic allies. Smaller locals and left union activists on the other had pushed for a clean break with the Democratic Party. This issue was debated internally for years until 1999 when the Party's leadership agreed to some endorsements of Labor Party members running.

=== Demise ===
After the 2000 elections, even symbolic support dripped away. In 2002, founding national organizer Tony Mazzocchi died. Mark Dudzic confirmed that the national party had suspended operations in 2007.

=== South Carolina ===
Despite national decline, the South Carolina chapter remained active. It has run several third-party candidates, in contrast to the national Labor Party.

In 2023, members of the SC branch called a convention, ended their affiliation with the (defunct) Labor Party, and renamed to the South Carolina Workers Party.

== Election results ==
In 2001 the Labor Party endorsed labor-sponsored independent candidates in San Francisco and Ohio local elections.

== National conventions ==
| Name | Date | Place | Program | Report |
|---|---|---|---|---|
| 1st Convention | June 6–9, 1996 | Cleveland, Ohio | "Call for Economic Justice" | |
| 2nd Convention | July 25–28, 2002 | Washington, DC | | Convention Highlights |

== See also ==
- American Left
- History of the socialist movement in the United States
- Democratic Socialists of America
- South Carolina Workers Party
