= Claudia De la Cruz =

American community organizer and activist (born 1980/81)

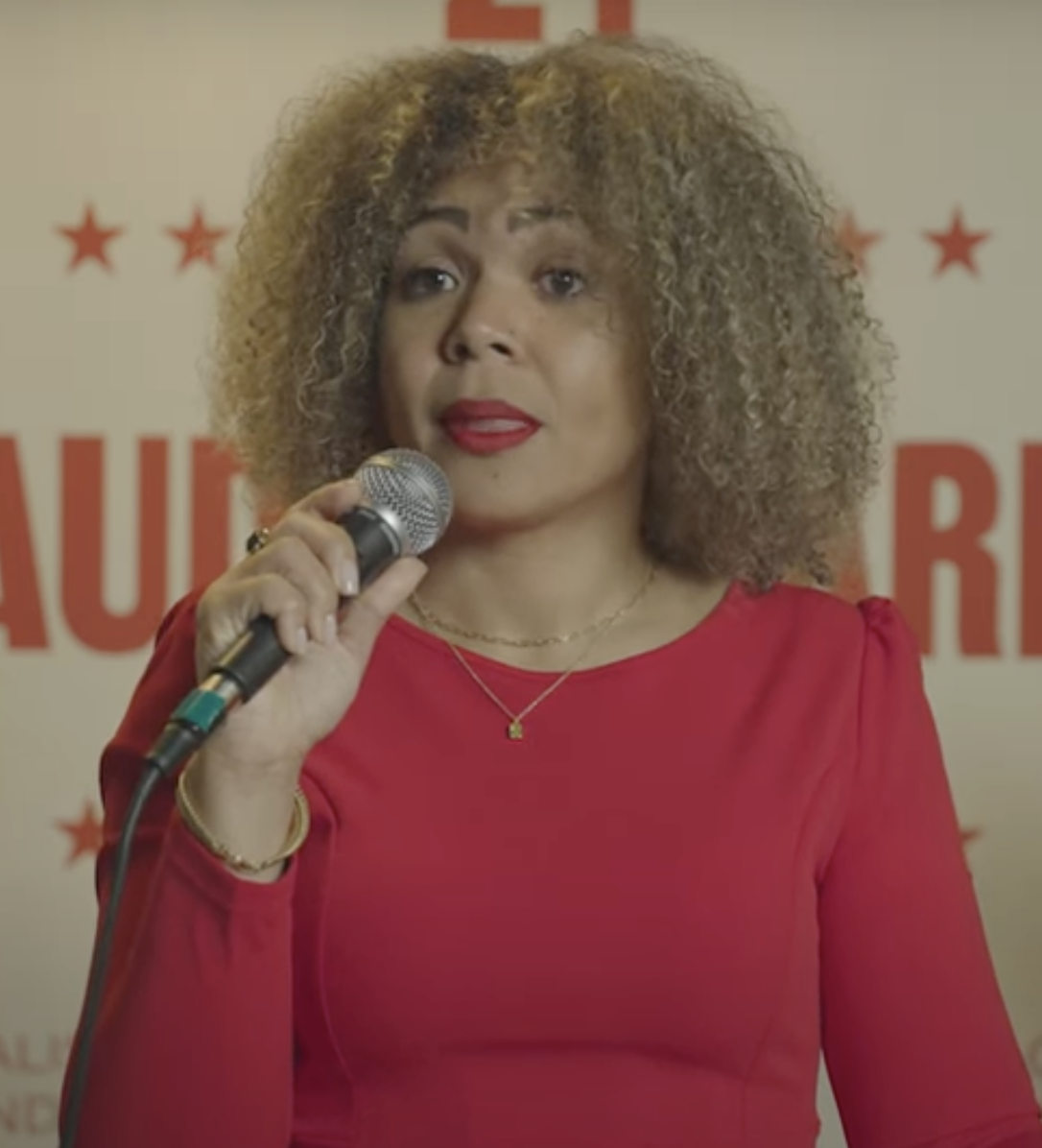
- De la Cruz in 2024

Personal details
- Born: 1980/1981 (age 44–45) South Bronx, New York City, U.S.
- Party: Party for Socialism and Liberation
- Education: John Jay College of Criminal Justice (BS); Columbia University (MSW); Union Theological Seminary (MDiv)
- Claudia De la Cruz's voice Claudia De la Cruz discusses the significance of the 2024 United States presidential election Recorded January 28, 2024

Claudia De la Cruz (born 1980/1981) is an American left-wing activist who was the Party for Socialism and Liberation nominee for president of the United States in the 2024 election.

== Early life and education ==
De la Cruz was born in the South Bronx to immigrants from the Dominican Republic. She attended Theodore Roosevelt High School and graduated in 1997. She says a visit to Cuba at age 17 inspired her opposition to imperialism.

In 2001, De la Cruz earned a bachelor's degree in forensic psychology from the John Jay College of Criminal Justice. In 2007, she earned a master's degree in social work from Columbia University and a master's degree in divinity from Union Theological Seminary.

== Career and activism ==
At the City University of New York, De la Cruz coordinated a teen group to study resistance movements and march against the 2003 Iraq War. In 2004, she founded Da Urban Butterflies (DUB), a Washington Heights-based leadership group for teens and young women of Dominican and Puerto Rican descent. The "Butterflies" name honored the three Dominican Mirabal sisters who were killed in November 1960 for opposing the dictatorship of Rafael Trujillo.

De la Cruz attended and later served as pastor of Santo Romero de Las Américas church, a UCC congregation in New York City. She saw that church was important to her "social and political formation" and "wanted to do community organizing from a faith-based perspective".

De la Cruz was co-executive director of The People's Forum, an activist organization in New York City that she co-founded. With the People's Forum, she has participated in numerous pro-Palestinian protests, including a "Shut Down Wall Street" event during the Gaza war. On October 3, 2023, De La Cruz participated in a forum sponsored by Code Pink, Peace in Ukraine and the A.N.S.W.E.R. Coalition that aimed to spur opposition to U.S. support of the Ukrainian government’s fight against the Russian invasion.

== 2024 presidential campaign ==
Logo for the 2024 presidential campaign for the Party for Socialism and Liberation

De la Cruz announced her presidential campaign on September 7, 2023. She and running mate Karina Garcia were the presidential ticket for the Party for Socialism and Liberation (PSL), a Marxist–Leninist party, in the 2024 U.S. presidential election. Their socialist policy program included a pledge to support reparations for Black Americans, institute a single-payer healthcare system, end all U.S. aid to Israel, forgive all student loan debt, fully recognize Native American sovereignty and honor treaty rights, cut the U.S. military budget by 90%, seize the 100 largest corporations, expand public transportation, and use taxation to eliminate billionaires.

On January 28, 2024, Claudia De la Cruz and Karina Garcia held their first in-person campaign event in Newark, New Jersey. On February 29, 2024, De la Cruz participated in a presidential candidates debate hosted by the Free & Equal Elections Foundation alongside Green Party candidates Jill Stein and Jasmine Sherman and Libertarian Party candidates Chase Oliver and Lars Mapstead.

In March 2024, the South Carolina Workers Party voted to place De la Cruz and Garcia on the state ballot for president and vice president. In June 2024, De la Cruz gave a speech at a pro-Palestine protest surrounding the White House.

In the 2024 election, De la Cruz claimed that the Democrats worked to keep her and other third-party candidates such as Cornel West off of ballots, with De la Cruz alleging in a statement that this was done because the party didn’t want to compete with a socialist candidate. In response, Democratic Party of Georgia Executive Director Tolulope Kevin Olasanoye said that administrative law judge Michael Malihi had “affirmed that none of [the aforementioned] candidates were qualified to be on the Georgia ballot” due to a change made to Georgia law in 2017 which states that petitions for independent candidates must be “filed in the name of the 16 presidential electors, and not the candidates themselves”. Republicans opposed this and Brad Raffensperger, Georgia Secretary of State, overruled the decision.

De la Cruz received 167,772 votes (0.11%). De la Cruz nearly doubled the PSL's 2020 total, and won the most votes received by a candidate running on an explicitly socialist presidential ticket since the Socialist Party's Norman Thomas in 1936.
