= South Carolina Workers Party =

Political party in the United States

- Abbreviation: SCWP
- Founded: March 16, 2023; 3 years ago
- Preceded by: Labor Party
- Ideology: Laborism; Progressivism; Socialism
- Political position: Left-wing
- Members in elected offices: 0

Website
- scworkers.org

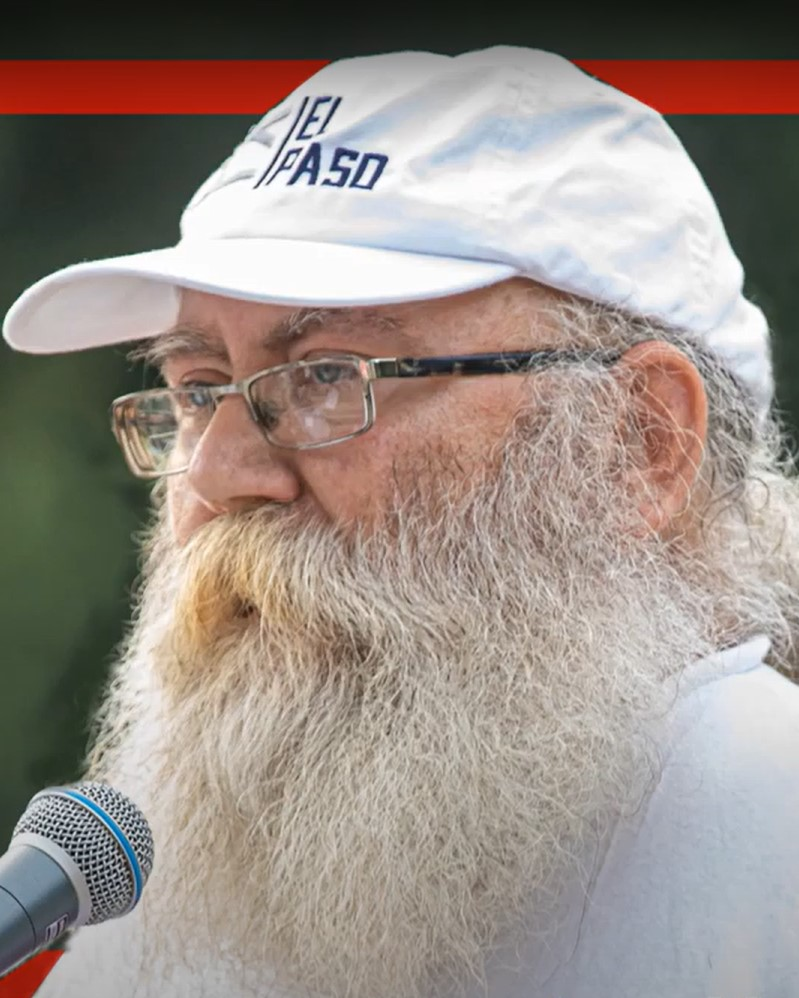
Votour announces his bid for the Democratic Party nomination for South Carolina governor, January 2020

The South Carolina Workers Party (SCWP) is a progressive political party in the United States. SCWP formed in 2023, when it split from the now defunct Labor Party.

== History ==
=== Origins ===
The SCWP was previously a chapter of the Labor Party, which went into decline in 2002. Despite national decline, the South Carolina chapter remained active and decided to pursue running candidates.

In December 2005, the South Carolina Labor Party (SCLP) announced that it would seek ballot status in South Carolina and run a candidate in the 2006 legislative elections. Labor Party News quoted Leonard Riley, President of the Charleston International Longshoremen's Association Local 1422 as saying, "Given the results of the past few elections, I think the workers of South Carolina would jump at the opportunity to consider a Labor Party which would guarantee an uncompromising voice for working people on their issues." Although South Carolina law permitted electoral fusion, the Labor Party pledged not to endorse candidates of any other party.

Party officials said that the relatively high unemployment rate, the decline in the textile industry, and the indifference of the state Democratic and Republican parties to the interests of working people, African-Americans and women created a political space for the Labor Party. The party submitted 16,500 signatures on July 11, 2006. If 10,000 of the signatures were valid, the party would be qualified for the 2007 and 2008 elections. This effort was apparently unrelated to the concurrent attempt of the Working Families Party to gain ballot access in South Carolina, a state that allows electoral fusion. In July 2007 Ballot Access News reported that the SCLP was attempting to recruit candidates.

=== Formation ===
South Carolina activists Gary Votour and Harold Geddings, candidates for governor and Congress respectively as Democratic Party candidates in 2020, left the party after former congressman Joe Cunningham was allowed to run as a Democratic candidate for governor although his position on the minimum wage was at odds with the party platform.

When Votour and Geddings decided to run as Labor Party candidates, a conflict between party leaders led to a legal challenge by the South Carolina Democratic Party. The judge ruled in favor of the Democratic Party, and Votour and Geddings were removed from the state ballot.

The former candidates led the Labor Party chapter to reform. In 2023, members of the SC branch called a convention, ended their affiliation with the (defunct) Labor Party, and renamed to the South Carolina Workers Party. The Workers Party is certified as a political party in South Carolina.

== Election results ==
SCWP has fielded electoral candidates for state and federal offices.

No SCWP candidate has yet won an election.

=== Presidential elections ===
In 2024, the SCWP nominated Party for Socialism and Liberation nominee Claudia De la Cruz for president, which granted PSL ballot access in South Carolina.

=== 2026 Elections ===
In 2026, Gary Votour filed to run for governor and for State House of Representatives, District 76. Kiral Mace filed for State House of Representatives, District 26. Dayna Smith filed for US House Congressional District 2.

| Year | Presidential candidate | Vice presidential candidate | Popular votes | % | Electoral votes | Result | Ballot access | Notes | Ref |
|---|---|---|---|---|---|---|---|---|---|
| 2024 | Claudia De la Cruz | Karina Garcia | 167,772 (#6) | 0.11% | 0 | Lost | 220 / 538 | The Party for Socialism and Liberation and the Peace and Freedom Party also nominated De la Cruz. (Note: 2024: "Ballot access" above includes all states where Claudia de la Cruz was not a write-in; ie, where they were a listed PSL, PFP, or LUP candidate. Claudia de la Cruz has write-in status in 22 states, with 243 possible electoral votes from write-ins.) | |

=== Congressional elections ===
| Year | Candidate | Chamber | State | District | Votes | % | Result | Notes | Ref |
|---|---|---|---|---|---|---|---|---|---|
| 2014 | Harold Geddings | House | South Carolina | 2nd | 4,158 | 2.13% | Lost | ran as SCLP candidate | |

=== State legislature elections ===
| Year | Candidate | Office | State | District | Votes | % | Result | Notes | Ref |
|---|---|---|---|---|---|---|---|---|---|
| 2024 | Gary Votour | House | South Carolina | 76th | 1,052 | 7.65% | Lost | ran as SCWP candidate | |
| 2024 | Harold Geddings | House | South Carolina | 93rd | 360 | 1.65% | Lost | ran as SCWP candidate | |
| 2024 | Kiral Mace | Senate | South Carolina | 16th | 11,991 | 20.72% | Lost | ran as SCWP candidate | |
| 2020 | Willie Legette | House | South Carolina | 95th | 1,650 | 12.07% | Lost | ran as SCLP candidate | |
| 2010 | Brett Bursey | House | South Carolina | 69th | 442 | 3.06% | Lost | ran as SCLP candidate | |

== See also ==
- American Left
- History of the socialist movement in the United States
- Democratic Socialists of America
- Labor Party (United States, 1996)
