= Günter Reimann =

German-born economist and writer

Günter Hans Reimann
- Born: Hans Steinicke; November 13, 1904; Angermünde, German Empire
- Died: February 5, 2005 (aged 100); Manhasset, New York, U.S.
- Education: University of Berlin (B.Sc.)
- Children: 4
- Relatives: Melina Abdullah (granddaughter)

Hans Steinicke (November 13, 1904 – February 5, 2005), better known by his pen-name Günter Reimann, was a German-born economist and writer. He was noted as founder and editor of International Reports, a New York-based weekly publication he created in 1947 and sold to the London Financial Times in 1983, and author of The Vampire Economy: Doing Business under Fascism (1939) about what he described as the onerous business policy of the Nazi Party and its disastrous effects on the Nazi economy. Prior to World War II, Reimann was a member of the Communist Party of Germany and at the forefront of the underground resistance to Adolf Hitler within Nazi Germany.

== Early life and education ==
Reimann was born in Angermünde (near Berlin), German Empire: the Steinickes were a bourgeois German-Jewish family. Drawn to the left-wing intelligentsia at an early age in Berlin, Reimann associated and worked with Ernst Thälmann, Anna Seghers and Walter Ulbricht at the Romanisches Café. Still a teenager, Reimann assumed the position of economics editor for the communist newspaper, Die Rote Fahne, taking on the pen-name of Günter Reimann.

He graduated with a degree in economics from the University of Berlin in 1928.

After the Reichstag fire in February 1933, Reimann went underground to oppose the new National Socialist regime under the resistance movement of the German social democrats and communists. In 1934, the Gestapo continued zeroing in on his location, finally raiding his house and arresting Hu Lanqi, who later became the first female general of the Chinese National Revolutionary Army. Reimann fled to France and then London.

After arriving in London, he wrote The Vampire Economy: Doing Business Under Fascism, published in 1939. In that treatise, Reimann documented how the oppressive rule of the Nazi regime crushed the autonomy of the private sector through severe regulations and the threat of confiscatory fines for petty offenses. As an economist, he later founded the "International Reports on Finance and Currencies" financial newsletter in 1947. He also authored Patents for Hitler in 1942.

After his migration to the United States, he lived in New York City, where he met Miriam Weber, a socialist activist, who he later married and fathered two children, before the two divorced. He then married Jutta Ruesch, a German citizen, and they subsequently had two children.

Reimann later moved to Manhasset, Long Island, New York. In 2004, Reimann was awarded Germany's Officer's Cross of the Order of Merit, the nation's highest civilian award. He died at the age of 100 on February 5, 2005. Reimann is survived by his wife Jutta, his four children, 4 grandchildren and 6 great-grandchildren. One of his grandchildren is Melina Abdullah, co-founder of the Los Angeles chapter of Black Lives Matter.

== Writings ==
- The Vampire Economy: Doing Business Under Fascism. New York City: Vanguard Press. 1939 – via Internet Archive.; republished by the Ludwig von Mises Institute, Auburn, Alabama (2007)
- Patents for Hitler, 1942
