= Church of St. Peter and St. Paul, Angermünde =

Coordinates: 53°00′58″N 14°00′21″E

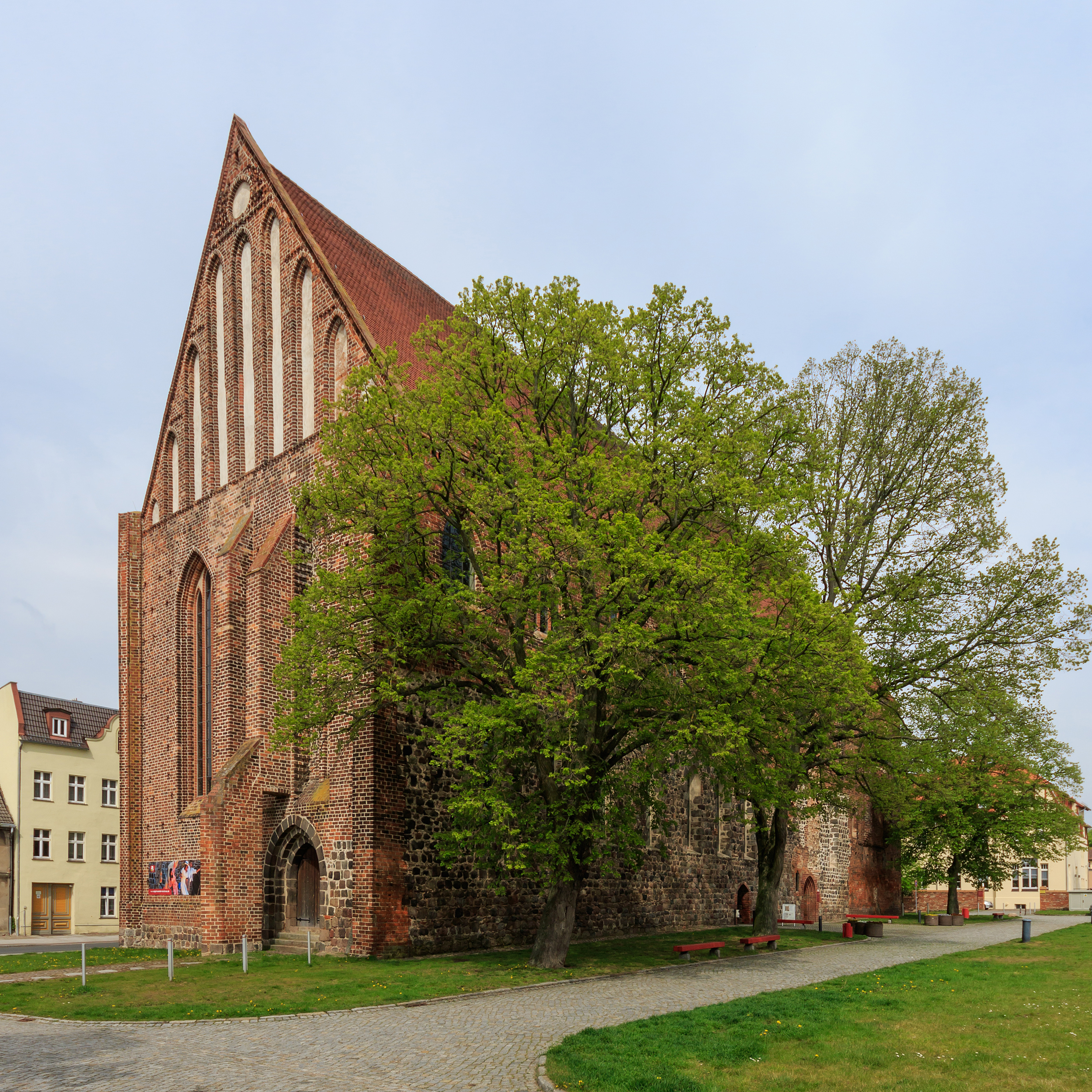
Exterior

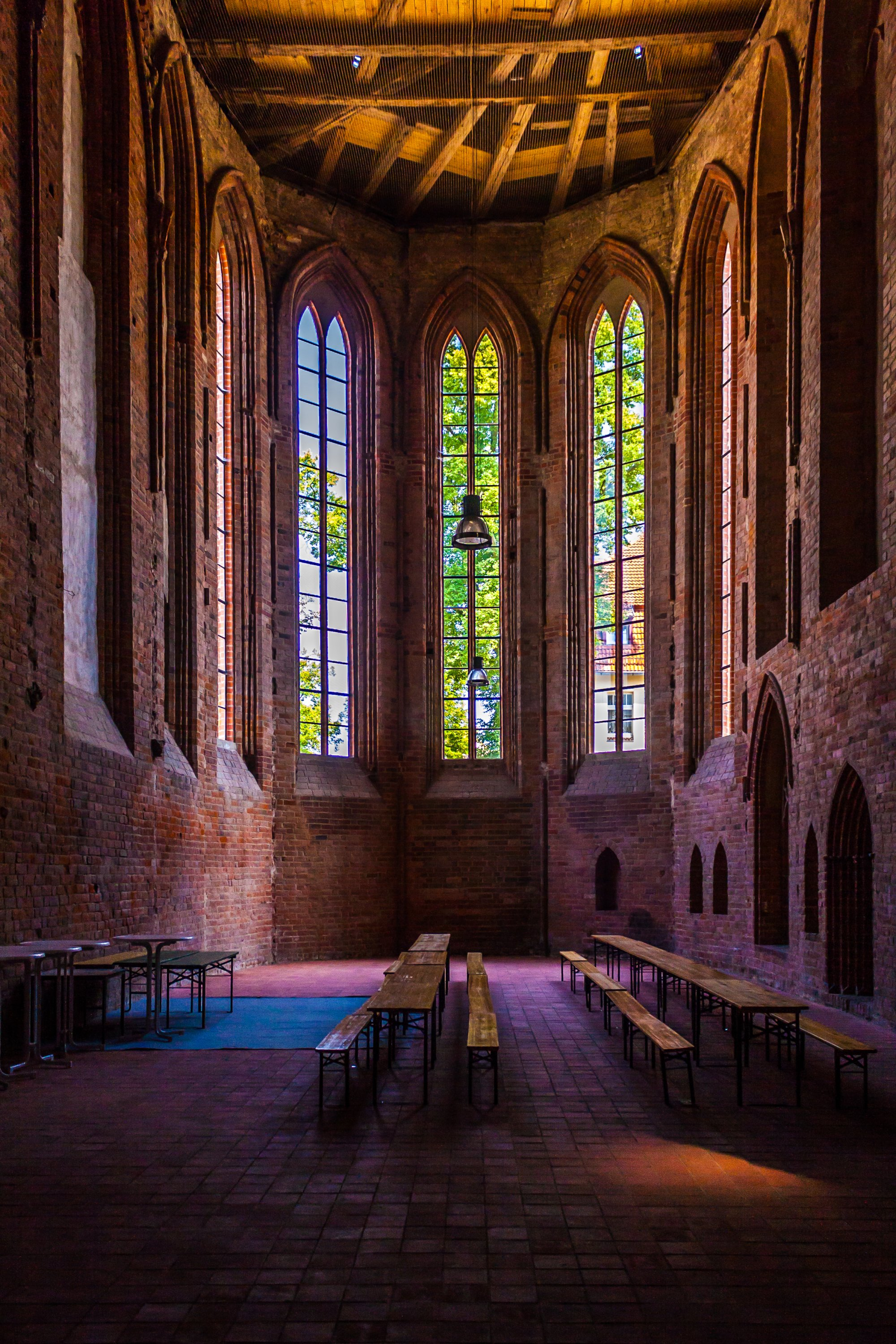
Interior

The Church of St. Peter and St. Paul (German: Klosterkirche Peter und Paul) is a former church in Angermünde.

== History ==
It was originally the church of a Franciscan monastery built in the second half of the 13th century and first recorded in 1299. It consists of a nave and a choir and is in the Brick Gothic style. The church's original roof timbers survive and have been dated to around 1440 by dendrochronology, suggesting the church was built at the start of the 15th century. A second aisle was built alongside the nave and choir, with the section beside the choir serving as a sacristy. The nave and choir are separated by a brick rood screen.

Bavaria was secularized after the Reformation and so the monastery was closed in 1543 – it and the church fell into disrepair. When Huguenots settled in Uckermark, the church was restored and used by them between 1699 and 1788.

From 1725 onwards the choir was used as a magazine and the southern monastery (with its two cloisters) was demolished in 1767. The church's vaults were demolished in 1825. During the 19th century and in the Nazi era the church was again restored. After German reunification the church was converted into a meeting hall.

== Sources ==
- Ein Kloster am Rande der Stadt klosterland.de
- Georg Dehio: Handbuch der Deutschen Kunstdenkmäler. Brandenburg. Berlin, München 2000, ISBN 3422030549, S. 22 – 25.
