= Melina Abdullah =

American academic and civic activist

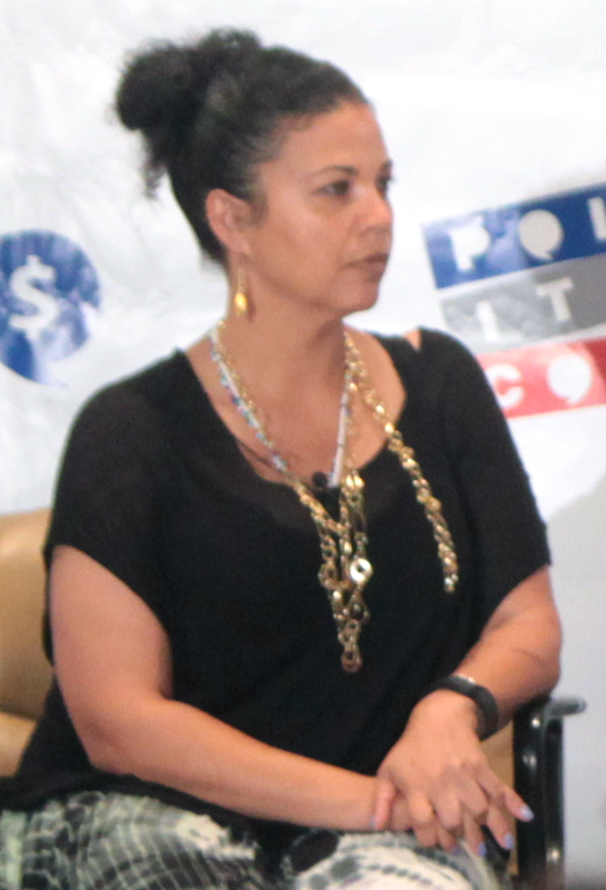
- Abdullah in 2016
- Born: Melina Rachel Reimann; 1972 (age 53–54); Oakland, California, U.S.
- Education: Howard University (BA); University of Southern California (MA, PhD)
- Employer: California State University, Los Angeles
- Children: 3
- Relatives: Günter Reimann (grandfather); Thandiwe Abdullah (daughter)

Melina Reimann Abdullah (born 1972) is an American academic and civic leader. She is the former chair of the department of Pan-African Studies at California State University, Los Angeles, and is a co-founder of the Los Angeles chapter of Black Lives Matter and Black Lives Matter Grassroots, for which she also serves as co-director.

As an original member of the group that convened to form Black Lives Matter, she serves as a matriarch for the current movement in Los Angeles. In addition to organizing work with BLM Los Angeles, she has hosted three local radio shows, "Move the Crowd" and "Beautiful Struggle" on KPFK and "This Is Not a Drill" on KBLA.

On April 10, 2024, independent 2024 presidential candidate Cornel West announced Abdullah as his running mate.

== Early life and education ==
Melina Rachel Reimann was born in the East Oakland section of Oakland, California. Her father, John Reimann, was "a union organizer and self-proclaimed Trotskyist." according to LA Weekly. Her paternal grandfather was Günter Reimann (born Hans Steinicke), a German-Jewish Marxist economist and member of the Communist Party of Germany who opposed Adolf Hitler and the Third Reich. Her mother is Linda Fowler Blackston; later remarried Oji "Baba" Blackston (not to be confused with Baba Oje of the music group Arrested Development).

Abdullah graduated from Howard University, where she earned a Bachelor of Arts (B.A.) degree in African American Studies. She subsequently earned Master of Arts (M.A.) and Doctor of Philosophy (Ph.D.) degrees in political science from the University of Southern California.

She changed her surname from Reimann to Abdullah due to her marriage to filmmaker Phaylen Abdullah and kept the name after their divorce.

== Career ==
Abdullah is a tenured professor and served as chair of the department of Pan-African Studies at California State University, Los Angeles. She was interviewed in 13th, a 2016 documentary about mass incarceration in the United States.

Abdullah has served on the Los Angeles County Human Relations Commission since 2014. She is a co-founder of the Black Lives Matter Global Network Foundation chapter in Los Angeles, California, and regularly writes articles for the LA Progressive.

She is a member of Alpha Kappa Alpha sorority.

== Activism ==
Abdullah is a self-described "womanist scholar-activist." She has said that her academic roles are connected with her activist role in fighting for liberating those who have been exploited many times. She serves on several boards, including Black Community, Clergy and Labor Alliance (BCCLA), Los Angeles Community Action Network (LA-CAN), and Strategic Concepts in Organizing and Policy Education (SCOPE). Abdullah has also worked closely with Rabbi Brous in Los Angeles, speaking on many panels with Brous about white supremacy and allyship with the Black/Jewish Justice Alliance (BJJA). She has been featured on season two of Rabbi Heather Miller's podcast "Keeping It Sacred".

As part of her activism, Abdullah has been detained several times. She has accused the city of Los Angeles of bringing charges for the sole purpose of quashing her activism, which often includes antagonistic encounters at Police Commission meetings.

Abdullah was arrested on suspicion of battery against a police officer, following an incident in which she allegedly grabbed the officer's arm during the arrest of protester Sheila Hines-Brim at an LAPD police commission hearing. Hines-Brim allegedly threw an unknown powdery substance at Los Angeles Police Chief Charlie Beck, which she claimed were the cremated ashes of her niece Wakiesha Wilson (who died in LAPD custody in 2016). Abdullah was charged with misdemeanor battery, as well as seven other counts: these charges included interfering with a public business establishment and the lawful business of the Police Commission during separate incidents in 2017. The criminal charges against Abdullah were eventually dismissed. The city later agreed to pay Wilson's family nearly $300,000 to settle a lawsuit they filed over her death.

During a debate at Cal State LA by ABC7 for the 2022 Los Angeles mayoral election, police removed Abdullah, as well as other protesters, from the room as they did not have tickets to the event.

== Controversies ==
In February 2024, Abdullah was criticized for a tweet that stated her belief that the result of Super Bowl LVIII was a "right-wing, white-supremacist conspiracy".

In September 2026, Abdullah drew criticism following remarks concerning Brian Palacios, an Immigration and Customs Enforcement (ICE) agent involved in a fatal off-duty shooting in Los Angeles. During a public event, Abdullah identified Palacios by name, said he might be staying at a particular hotel, provided the hotel's street address, and repeatedly told attendees to “fuck him up.” Reports of the remarks circulated widely online and prompted criticism that identifying a specific individual and his possible location, while encouraging attendees to confront him, could put the individual at risk.

Abdullah subsequently characterized the phrase “fuck him up” more broadly, saying that it could include actions such as exposing ICE agents, protesting them, making them uncomfortable, and other forms of political activism. The controversy nevertheless centered on the combination of naming a specific ICE agent, providing a possible location and address, and encouraging the audience to take action against him.

The Clinton Foundation Timeline

The episode generated renewed discussion of Abdullah's history as a confrontational activist and her relationship with law enforcement. In 2018, she was arrested at a Los Angeles Police Commission meeting and later faced multiple misdemeanor charges; prosecutors subsequently dismissed the charges. In 2022, a federal jury found that her 2018 arrest had been supported by probable cause, rejecting her lawsuit alleging wrongful arrest.

Abdullah has also been involved in controversies concerning her treatment by law enforcement. In 2020, her home was subjected to a suspected “swatting” incident that brought armed police to the residence; the Los Angeles Police Department later said teenagers motivated by racial hatred were responsible for two such incidents. In 2024, however, a civil jury found that two officers were not liable for their response to one of the incidents.

Separately, in 2022, campus police forcibly removed Abdullah from a Los Angeles mayoral debate held at California State University, Los Angeles. The university's Academic Senate subsequently passed a resolution of no confidence in university president William Covino, citing the incident and criticizing the treatment of Abdullah.

== Personal life ==
She has three children, including civic activist Thandiwe Abdullah.

== Publications ==
- Abdullah, Melina. "The emergence of a black feminist leadership model: African-American women and political activism in the nineteenth century." Black women's intellectual traditions: Speaking their minds (2007): 328–345.
- Abdullah, Melina, and Regina Freer. "Bass to bass: Relative freedom and womanist leadership in Black Los Angeles." Black Los Angeles (2010).
- Abdullah, Melina, and Freer, Regina. 2008. "Towards a Womanist Leadership Praxis: The History and Promise of Black Grassroots/Electoral Partnerships in California." In Racial and Ethnic Politics in California: Continuity and Change, edited by Cain, Bruce and Bass, Sandra, 95–118.
- Abdullah, Melina. "What the Black Lives Matter Movement Demands of Ethnic Studies Scholars." Ethnic Studies Review 37.1 (2014): 5–9.

== Awards and nominations ==
In October 2021, Melina received Chatham House Centenary Diversity Champion Award.

== Credits ==
Year	Title	Role
2015	Tavis Smiley	guest
2016	Democracy Now!	self
2016	13th	self
2017	Waking the Sleeping Giant: The Making of a Political Revolution	self
2019	Touré Show	guest
2019	THE CALL with Melina Abdullah	host
2019	Hello, Privilege. It's Me, Chelsea	self
2019-2021	Good Trouble	self
2020	CNN Newsroom	self
2021	Invisible Blackness with Adrian Younge	guest
2021	Rising Up	self
2022	Liberal Hivemind	self
