= Thandiwe Abdullah =

American political activist

- Born: 2003 or 2004 (age 21–22)
- Education: Howard University
- Occupation: Political activist
- Mother: Melina Abdullah

Thandiwe Abdullah is an American political activist best known for her support of the Black Lives Matter movement. She is a co-founder of the Black Lives Matter Youth Vanguard which advocates for the reduction of police in schools.

== Biography ==
Abdullah is the daughter of Melina Abdullah, one of the co-founders of Black Lives Matter LA. She grew up in the Crenshaw District of Los Angeles and has Jewish heritage on her mother's side. She majored in African-American studies at Howard University.

When she was a child, Abdullah was brought along by her mother to protests, including a rally in support of the Jena Six as a two-year-old and marching in protest of the murder of Oscar Grant when she was six. In 2013 and 2014, at the age of 10, Abdullah took part in the several protest marches, including the protests following the killing of Trayvon Martin and the Ferguson protests that arose in response to the killing of Michael Brown in 2014, and she took notice of the lack of teenagers and other youth. This led her to co-found Black Lives Matter Youth Vanguard in 2015. The group advocates for the reduction of police in schools and was successful in stopping random police searches in Los Angeles schools. In 2018, Abdullah addressed a crowd of 500,000 at the Women's March in Los Angeles.

All the sudden I’m seeing huge corporations that were once shying away from the controversy of even admitting that my life matters, saying, 'Hey, your life, it matters now... so here’s a 50%-off, all-black hoodie.'

— Thandiwe Abdullah

Abdullah created Black Lives Matter in Schools when she was 15, an effort that promotes racial justice that was eventually adopted by the Los Angeles School Board. She also is involved with the March for Our Lives, a student-led organization which demonstrates in support of gun control legislation. Abdullah has been critical of corporations "co-opting" the Black Lives Matter movement.

== Awards and honors ==
In 2018, Abdullah was named one of Time magazine's 25 Most Influential Teens for being "one of her generation's most powerful voices on issues relating to social justice".
