= Paul Erdmann Isert =

German botanist (1756–1789)

- Born: 1756; Angermünde, Brandenburg
- Died: 21 January 1789 (aged about 33); Danish West Africa
- Education: Berlin
- Known for: Opposition to Atlantic slave trade, Reise nach Guinea und den Caribäischen Inseln in Columbia (Journey to Guinea and the Caribbean Islands in Columbia)
- Scientific career
- Fields: Mediucine, ornithology, botany
- Workplaces: Christiansborg Castle, Osu, Accra (now Ghana), Danish Guinea

Paul Erdmann Isert (1756 – 21 January 1789) was a German-Danish surgeon, botanist and planter

He was the first scientist to identify the bird Red Bishop (Euplectes orix franciscana (Isert)). He is also known for his attempts to end the Danish slave trade.

== Biography ==
Isert was born in Angermünde, Brandenburg, but educated in Berlin. He was appointed Chief Surgeon to Christiansborg (Osu, Accra) in Danish Guinea, arriving there in 1783. He sought this position because of his burning desire to collect plant specimens from West Africa. Once there, realizing that the inhabitants had no written language, he felt it his duty to record – for future generations – details of all aspects of life on the Gold Coast, as he observed them, thus creating an ethnographic, as well as botanical, work.

After nearly three years on the Gold Coast Isert abruptly determined to leave the country on the first possible ship back to Europe. This was due to his extreme frustration at being hindered from exploring in Ashanti. It was on this ship, a slave ship en route from Danish Guinea, on the second day at sea, that he witnessed a slave rebellion on the open sea, which almost cost him his life. The cargo of 452 blacks rose against the whites, with a resulting loss of 34 of their number and 2 of the crew wounded after a heated battle. In the West Indies, he visited Saint Croix, Saint. Thomas, Saint John, Guadeloupe and Martinique. Sickened by the horror and human misery he saw, both in the slave-processing dungeons of Christiansborg, aboard the ship, and on the sugar plantations, Isert came up with an alternative to the abhorrent practice of the transatlantic slave trade. He found it not only inhumane, cruel and immoral, but also absurdly stupid. In a letter sent from Saint Croix in 1787 to his father, Isert asked questions:

Why were our forefathers not sensible enough to establish plantations right there in the fertile continent of Africa; plantations for sugar, coffee, cacao, cotton and other articles that had become so necessary in Europe?

...if we had come to them with an olive branch in our hand instead of murderous steel, the natives would willingly have given us access to the best and most fertile parts of their lands, areas which for untold years had been lying desolate.

These African people would have helped us in freedom and, for low wages would have given us greatness and riches with no offense against nature, or our personal and national consciences.

Why did we have to uproot vast numbers of people from their homelands, subject them to agony, torture, humiliation, and death; transplant them to alien continents, Caribbean islands, big and small? Why?

Isert wanted to demonstrate that the establishment of working plantations on the continent of Africa could be practical and profitable. To this end, he enlisted the aid of Ernst Heinrich von Schimmelmann, who was then the Danish-Norwegian Minister of Finance. Schimmelmann, a well-known and well-off liberal, who was later instrumental in the passage of the law ending the Danish-Norwegian transatlantic slave trade, agreed to finance Isert's endeavour.

In 1788, Isert published his famous book Reise nach Guinea und den Caribäischen Inseln in Columbia (Journey to Guinea and the Caribbean Islands in Columbia), wherein he described his experiences with, and his views on, the slave trade. Later in the summer, he sailed for Africa and established a crown plantation, Frederiksnopel, near Akropong in the fertile and cool Akwapim Hills reminiscent of the Mediterranean, purchasing the land from the Akwapim chief, Nana Obuobi Atiemo, on behalf of the King Christian VII of Denmark. Isert and Nana Obuobi Atiemo had been comrades-in-arms during a war in 1783, waged at the Volta River, and had evidently formed a lasting friendship. With the help of Nana Obuobi Atiemo, who shared Isert's enthusiasm about the plan, paid African workers and the European group that had accompanied Isert, cleared the land and planted only easily cultivated plants, for their own sustenance. Trade products, such as sugar and cotton, would be put off until later.

On 16 January 1789, Isert wrote a report to the King of Denmark in which he expressed the fine initial success that he was enjoying. Isert died on 21 January 1789, just five days after writing the report. It was believed that Isert had died from a tropical fever. His wife, Dorothea Elisabeth Plum died a short time after the birth of their child, a daughter, who also died, a month later, on 8 March. Isert's assistants attempted to carry on the project at Frederiksnopel, as did some others, but it failed due to various factors; such as distance from the sea, lack of support, and competition from Christiansborg.

Convinced of the feasibility of the plantations, an edict was issued in the name of King Christian VII by his son Prince Frederick (who was then Regent because of his father's mental illness) on 16 March 1792, which came into effect on 1 January 1803. Denmark-Norway thus bears the honour of being the first established sovereign state to prohibit the transatlantic slave trade. But ultimately, the experimental plantations proved to be unsuccessful.

== Other works ==
- Baunkær, Ingeborg: Lægen Paul Iserts breve fr Dansk Hunea 1783-1787 (1917)

Voyages en Guinée et dans les îles Caraïbes en Amérique. Tirés de sa correspondance avec ses amis
