= Angermünde =

- Town
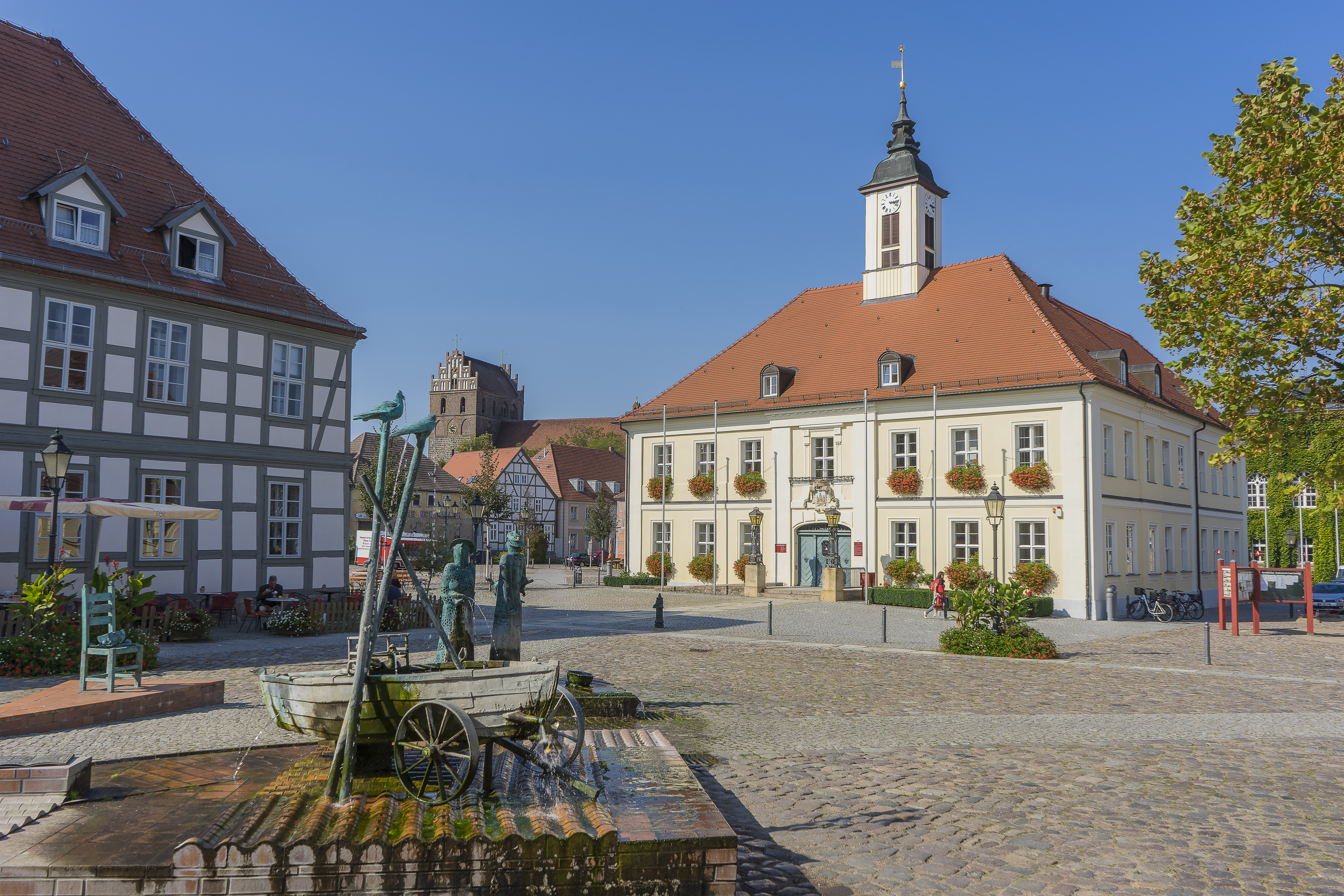
- Market Square and Townhall

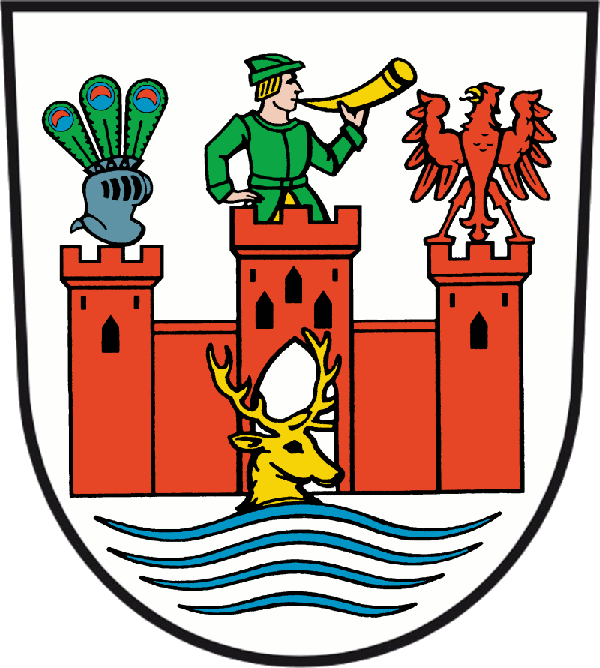
- Coat of arms

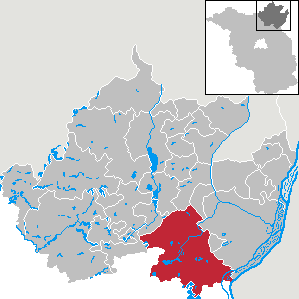
- Location of Angermünde within Uckermark district
- Interactive map of Angermünde
- Location within Germany Location within Brandenburg
- Coordinates: 53°02′N 14°00′E
- Country: Germany
- State: Brandenburg
- District: Uckermark
- Subdivisions: 24 Ortsteile

Government
  - Mayor (2016–24): Frederik Bewer

Area
  - Total: 324.21 km^{2} (125.18 sq mi)
- Elevation: 50 m (160 ft)

Population (2025-12-31)
  - Total: 14,015
  - Density: 43.228/km^{2} (111.96/sq mi)
- Time zone: UTC+01:00 (CET)
  - Summer (DST): UTC+02:00 (CEST)
- Postal codes: 16278
- Dialling codes: 03331
- Vehicle registration: UM
- Website: www.angermuende.de

Angermünde (German pronunciation: [aŋɐˈmʏndə]) is a town in the district of Uckermark in the state of Brandenburg, in north-eastern Germany. It is about 43 miles (69 km) northeast of Berlin, the capital of Germany.

The population is about 14,000, but has been declining since its traditional industrial base, enamel-working, has declined. An administrative sub-centre of its district, it has several Protestant churches, a former Franciscan church, a number of schools of higher learning and a recently refurbished historic marketplace with an old town hall. Located in the game-filled forests of the Uckermark, with its many lakes, it now relies heavily on tourism and the sources of revenue linked to it.

Since 2010, Angermünde is a federally declared resort town.

== Name ==
The name Angermünde is an abbreviation of the older town of Tangermünde, for a while the town was named New-Tangermünde (Neu-Tangermünde), until it was changed to "Angermünde", with Anger being German for a central square in a town.

== Geography ==
Angermünde is located in the Uckermarck region, roughly 69 km north of Berlin. It is made up of the Inner City (German: Kernstadt), and 23 adjacent districts. The districts are: Altkünkendorf, Biesenbrow, Bölkendorf, Bruchhagen, Crussow, Dobberzin, Frauenhagen, Gellmersdorf, Görlsdorf, Greiffenberg, Günterberg, Herzsprung, Kerkow, Mürow, Neukünkendorf, Schmargendorf, Schmiedeberg, Steinhöfel, Stolpe, Welsow, Wilmersdorf, Wolletz, and Zuchenberg. In addition, there are 40 registered neighborhoods (German: Wohnplätze) within the districts. The registered neighborhood are: Altenhof, Augustenfelde, Ausbau, Ausbau Mürower Straße, Ausbau Pinnower Weg, Ausbau Welsower Weg, Bauernsee, Blumberger Mühle, Breitenteicher Mühle, Friedrichsfelde, Gehegemühle, Glambecker Mühle, Greiffenberg Siedlung, Grumsin, Henriettenhof, Klein Frauenhagen, Leistenhof, Leopoldsthal, Linde, Lindenhof, Louisenhof, Luisenthal, Mürow-Oberdorf, Neu-Günterberg, Neuhaus, Neuhof, Peetzig, Rosinthal, Schäferei, Sonnenhof, Sternfelde, Stolper Mühle, Thekenberg, Waldfried, Waldfrieden, Wilhelmsfelde, Wilhelmshof, Ziethenmühle, und Zollende. With an area of around 324 km^{2}, Angermünde was, as of 2020, Germany's 17th largest municipality.

== History ==
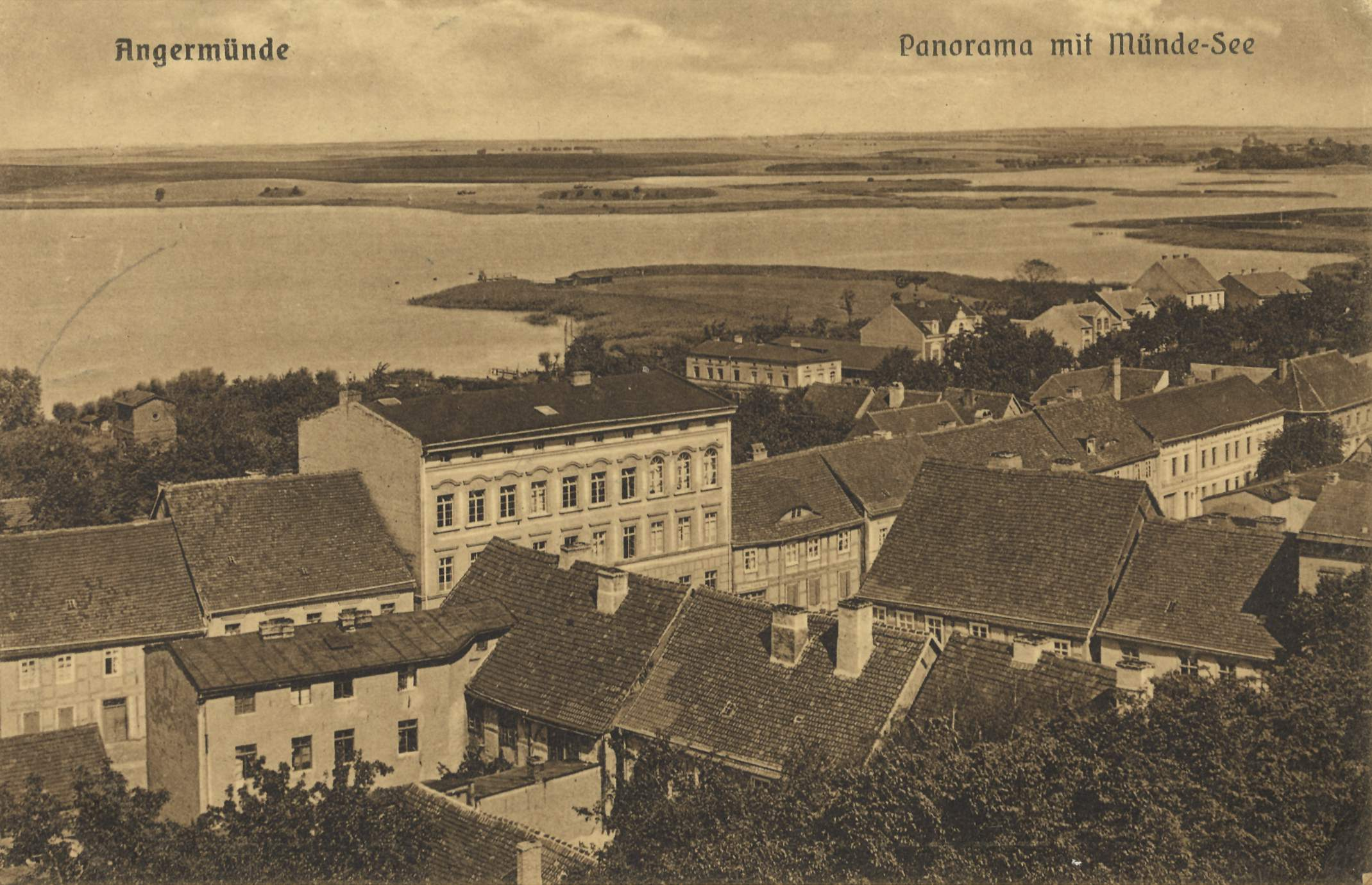
Postcard from c. 1900

The town was the site of a 1420 victory of Frederick I of Brandenburg over the Pomeranians. Since 1687, French Huguenots settled in the town, and the Holy Spirit Chapel served as the French church.

From 1815 to 1947, Angermünde was part of the Prussian Province of Brandenburg. In the 19th century, the town was the seat of a Prussian circle in the Province of Brandenburg and linked to Berlin by the railway to Stettin (now Szczecin, Poland). Angermünde station then served as the junction for branch lines servicing Prenzlau, Bad Freienwalde, and Schwedt. During World War II, the Germans operated five forced labour subcamps of the Stalag III-C prisoner-of-war camp in the town.

From 1947 to 1952, Angermünde was part of the State of Brandenburg, from 1952 to 1990 of the Bezirk Frankfurt of East Germany and since 1990 again of Brandenburg.

== Climate ==
Climate data for Angermünde (1991–2020 normals)
Month	Jan	Feb	Mar	Apr	May	Jun	Jul	Aug	Sep	Oct	Nov	Dec	Year
Mean daily maximum °C (°F)	2.8 (37.0)	4.3 (39.7)	8.3 (46.9)	14.6 (58.3)	19.1 (66.4)	22.2 (72.0)	24.5 (76.1)	24.2 (75.6)	19.4 (66.9)	13.4 (56.1)	7.1 (44.8)	3.7 (38.7)	13.6 (56.5)
Daily mean °C (°F)	0.4 (32.7)	1.3 (34.3)	4.1 (39.4)	9.1 (48.4)	13.5 (56.3)	16.8 (62.2)	18.9 (66.0)	18.5 (65.3)	14.3 (57.7)	9.3 (48.7)	4.6 (40.3)	1.6 (34.9)	9.4 (48.9)
Mean daily minimum °C (°F)	−2.1 (28.2)	−1.7 (28.9)	0.3 (32.5)	3.7 (38.7)	7.7 (45.9)	11.3 (52.3)	13.5 (56.3)	13.2 (55.8)	9.6 (49.3)	5.6 (42.1)	2.0 (35.6)	−0.7 (30.7)	5.2 (41.4)
Average precipitation mm (inches)	38.0 (1.50)	28.9 (1.14)	36.9 (1.45)	27.2 (1.07)	52.1 (2.05)	54.2 (2.13)	71.0 (2.80)	57.8 (2.28)	45.5 (1.79)	38.0 (1.50)	35.4 (1.39)	37.1 (1.46)	521.9 (20.55)
Average precipitation days (≥ 0.1 mm)	15.5	13.4	13.8	10.7	12.7	12.9	13.8	13.2	11.4	13.8	14.3	16.3	161.6
Average snowy days (≥ 1.0 cm)	8.8	8.5	3.3	0.5	0	0	0	0	0	0.1	1.4	5.8	30.2
Average relative humidity (%)	87.0	83.0	78.3	70.7	71.0	71.1	71.2	72.8	78.7	84.6	89.8	89.1	79.1
Mean monthly sunshine hours	50.7	74.0	130.2	196.6	233.6	228.8	237.1	221.3	165.1	111.8	49.6	39.3	1,738.1
Source: NOAA

== Demography ==
Development of population since 1875 within the current boundaries (blue line: population; dotted line: comparison to population development in Brandenburg state; grey background: time of Nazi Germany; red background: time of communist East Germany)

Recent population development and projections (population development before 2011 census (blue line); recent population development according to the Census in Germany in 2011 (blue bordered line); official projections for 2005-2030 (yellow line); for 2017-2030 (scarlet line); for 2020-2030 (green line)

Angermünde: Population development
within the current boundaries (2020)

Year	Pop.	±% p.a.
1875	16,460	—
1890	15,733	−0.30%
1910	16,545	+0.25%
1925	18,373	+0.70%
1939	18,139	−0.09%
1950	24,884	+2.92%
1964	22,204	−0.81%

Year	Pop.	±% p.a.
1971	21,037	−0.77%
1981	18,651	−1.20%
1985	18,110	−0.73%
1990	17,372	−0.83%
1995	16,488	−1.04%
2000	16,481	−0.01%
2005	15,276	−1.51%

Year	Pop.	±% p.a.
2010	14,360	−1.23%
2015	13,805	−0.79%
2016	13,797	−0.06%
2017	13,837	+0.29%
2018	13,744	−0.67%
2019	13,757	+0.09%
2020	13,637	−0.87%

== Mayors ==
- 1989–1998: Wolf-Hugo Just
- 1998–2016: Wolfgang Krakow (SPD)
- since 2016: Frederik Bewer (independent)

Frederik Bewer was elected in May 2016 with 95.3% of the vote, for an eight-year term.

== Gallery ==
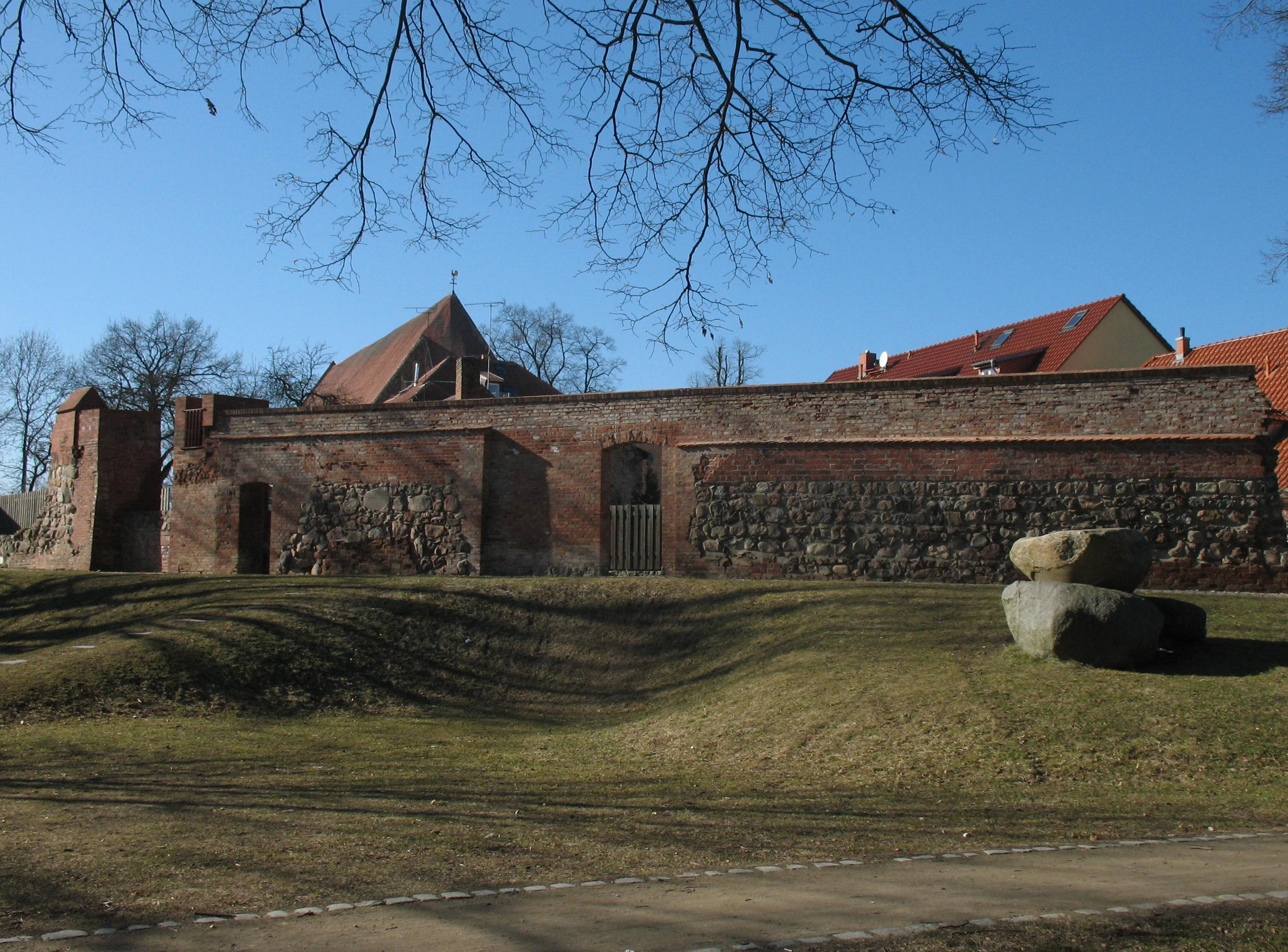
City wall

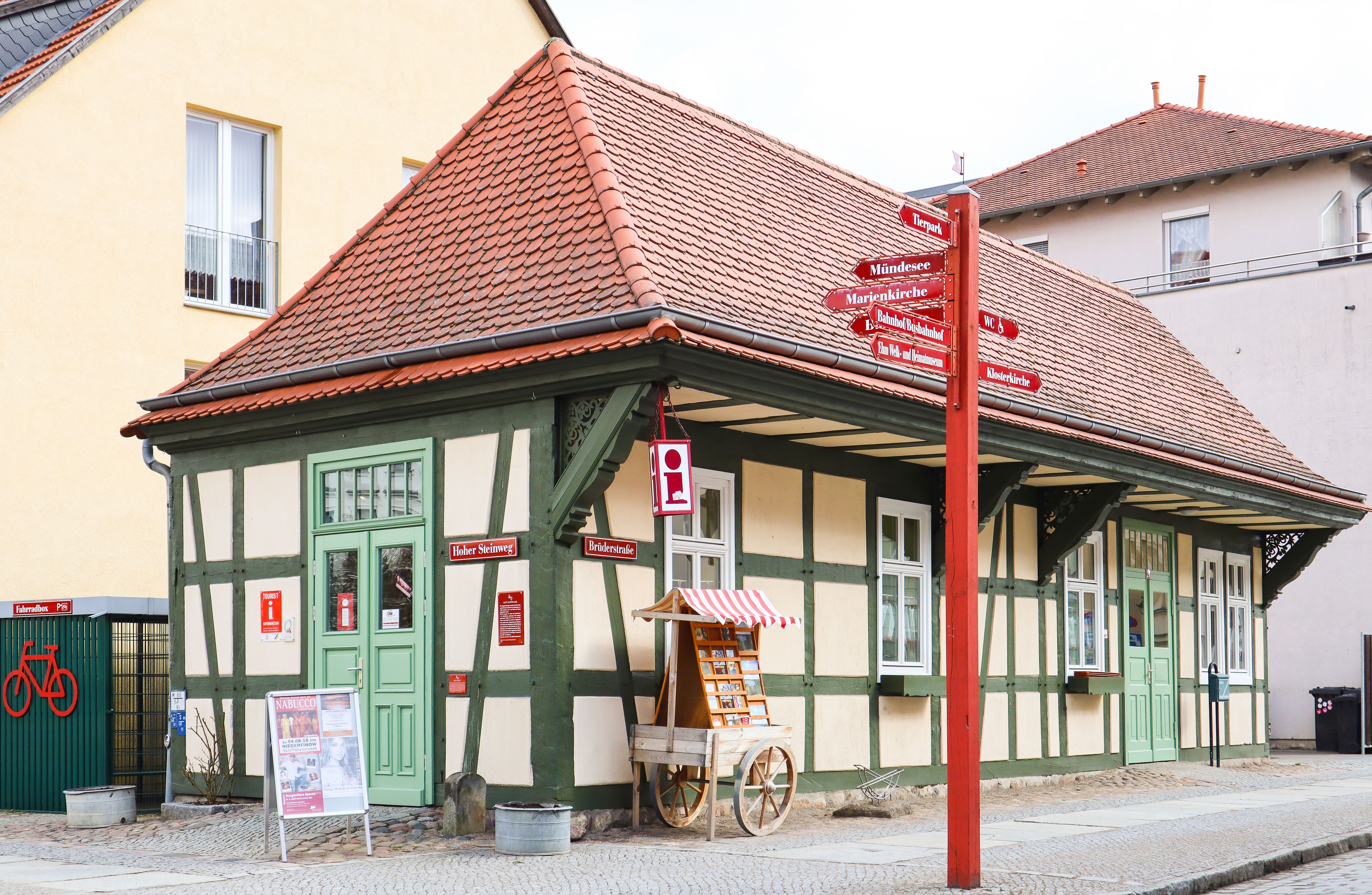
Tourist information

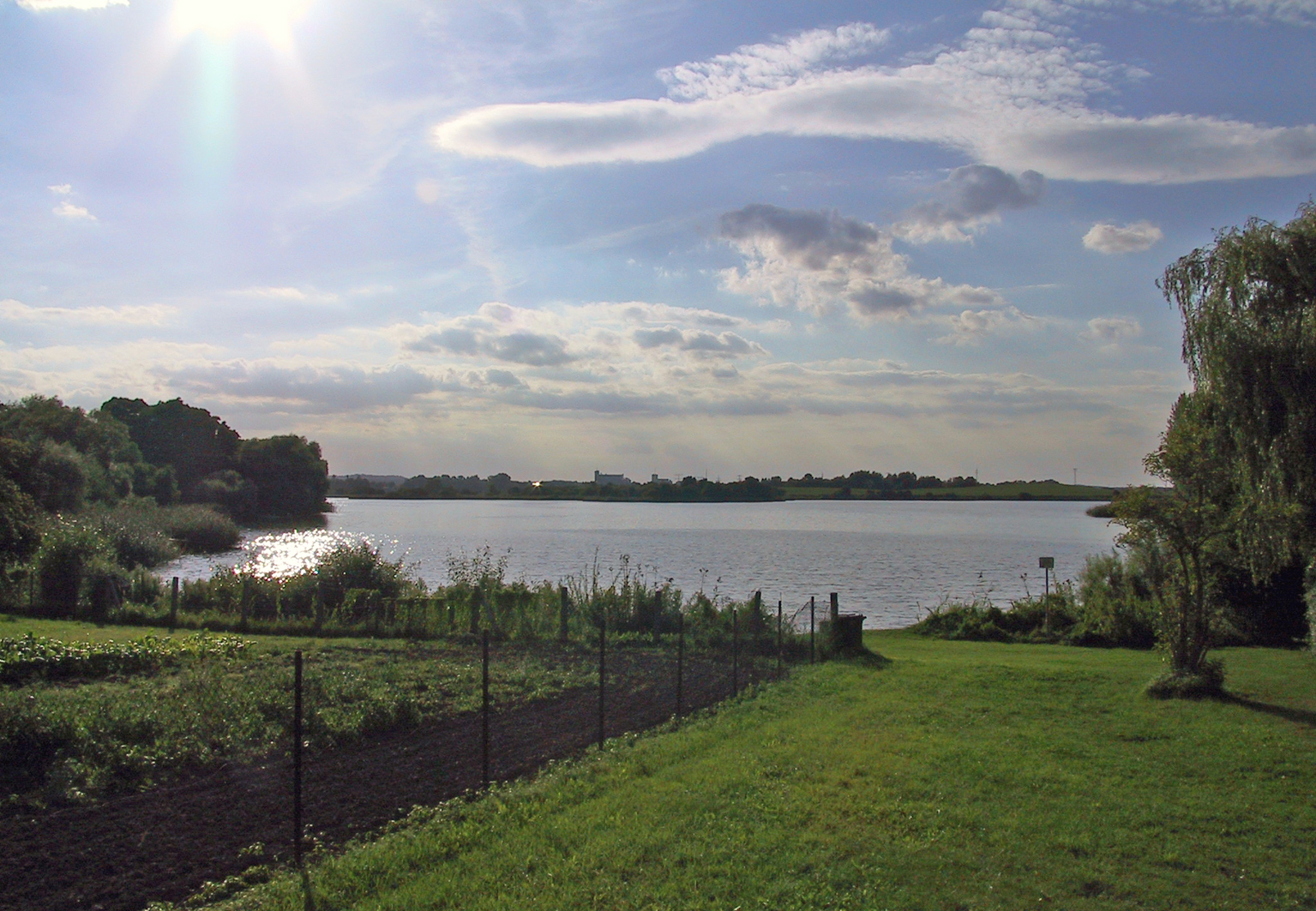
The lake Mündesee in Angermünde.

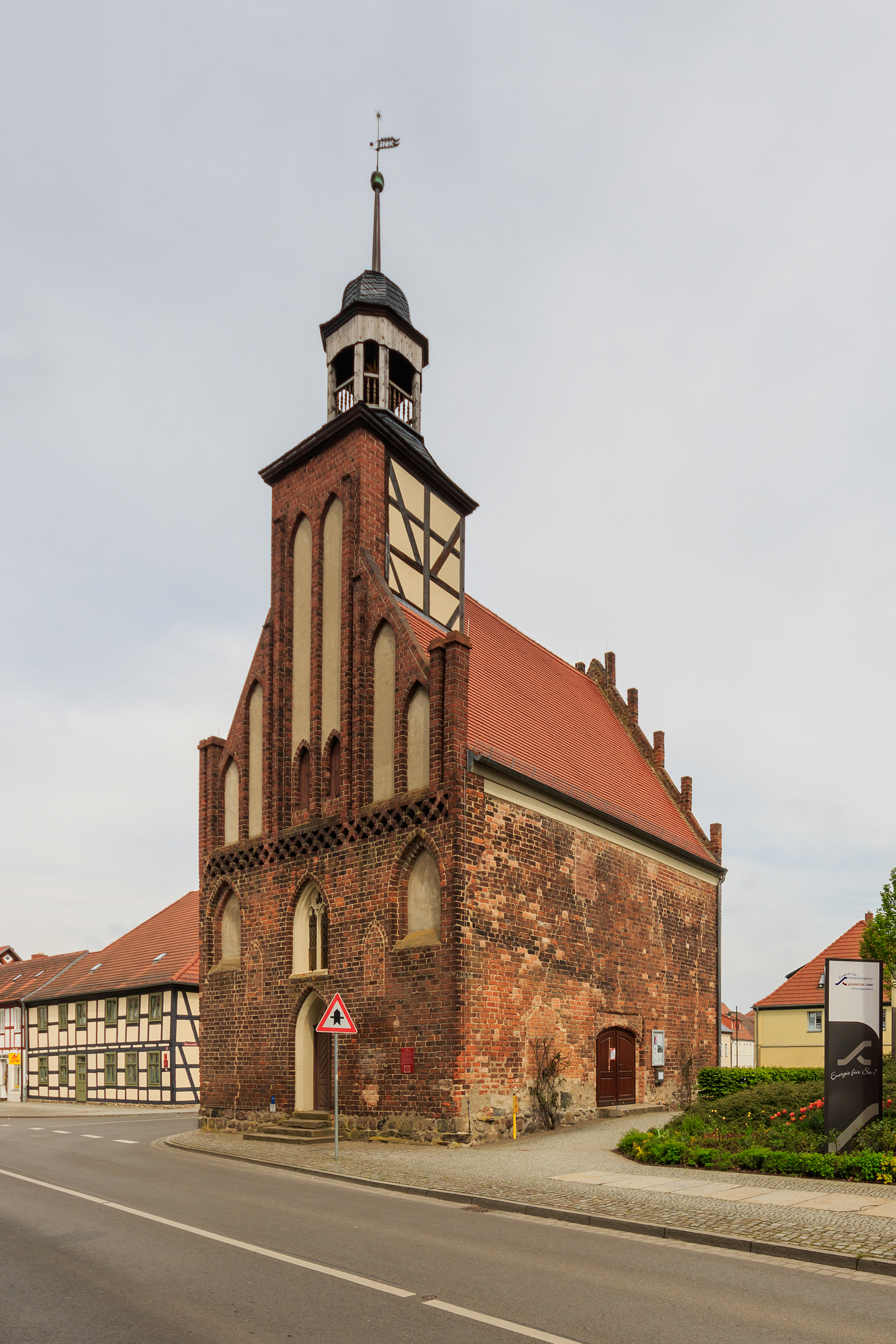
Holy Spirit Chapel

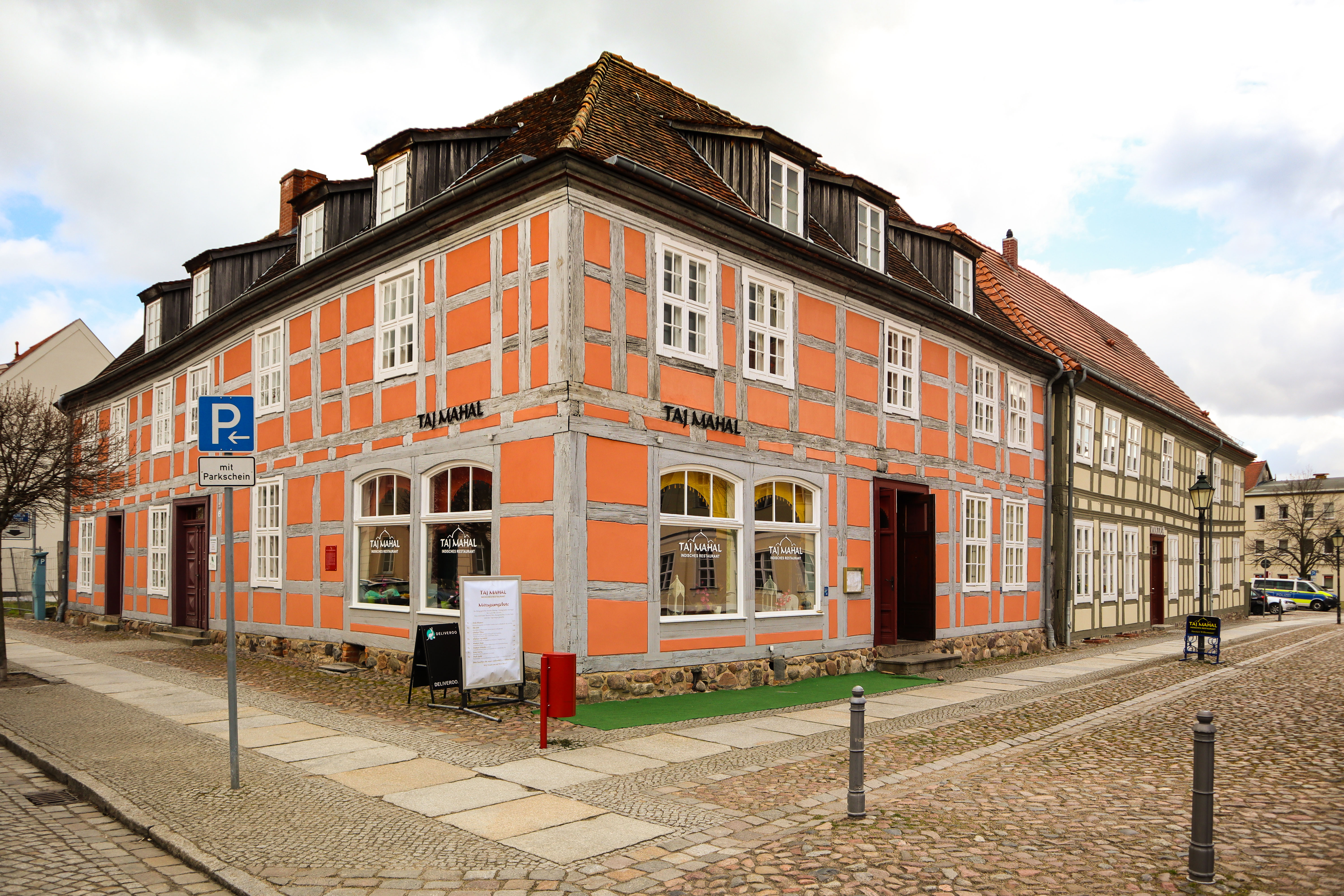
Timbered house

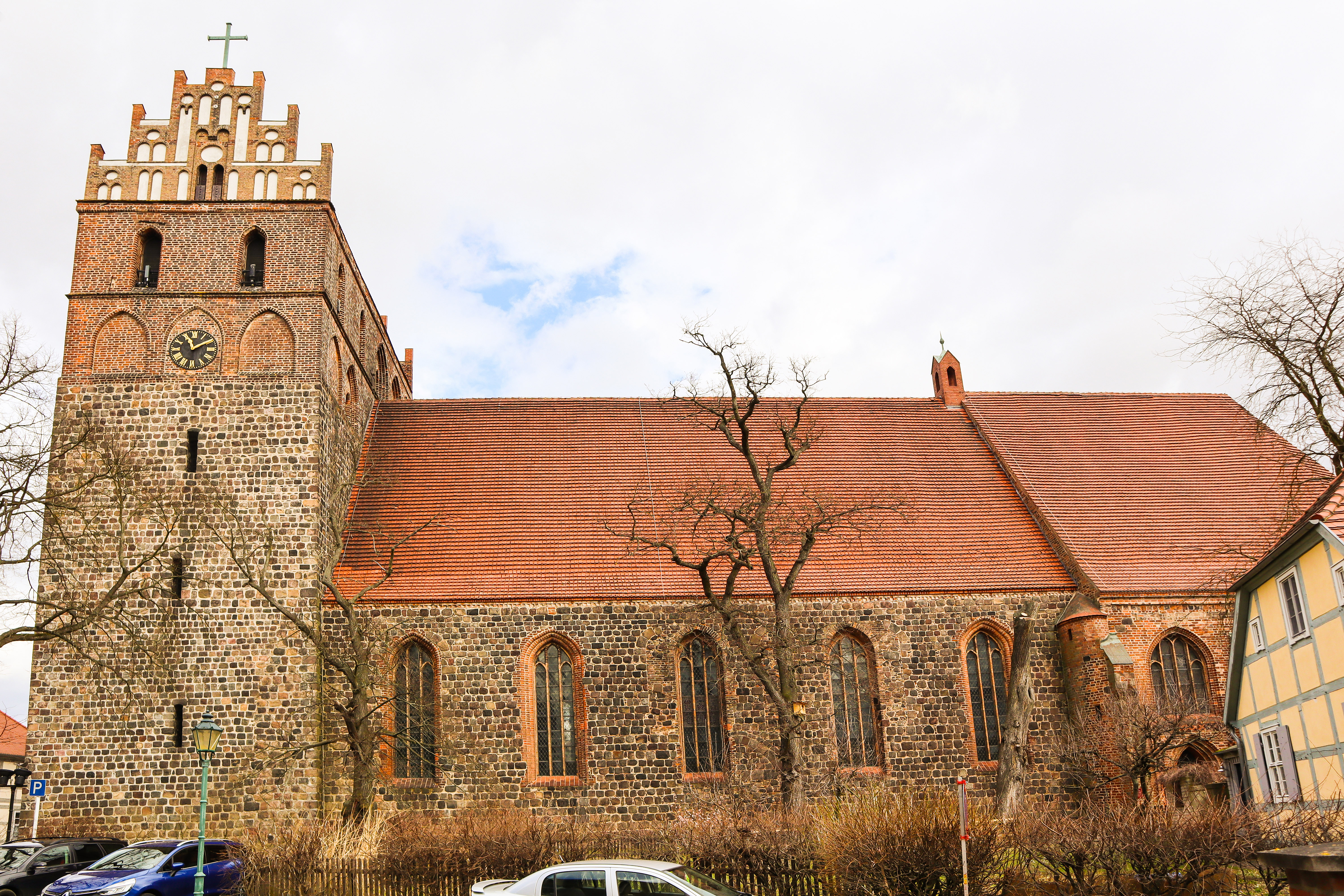
City Church St. Mary

Church in Schmiedeberg

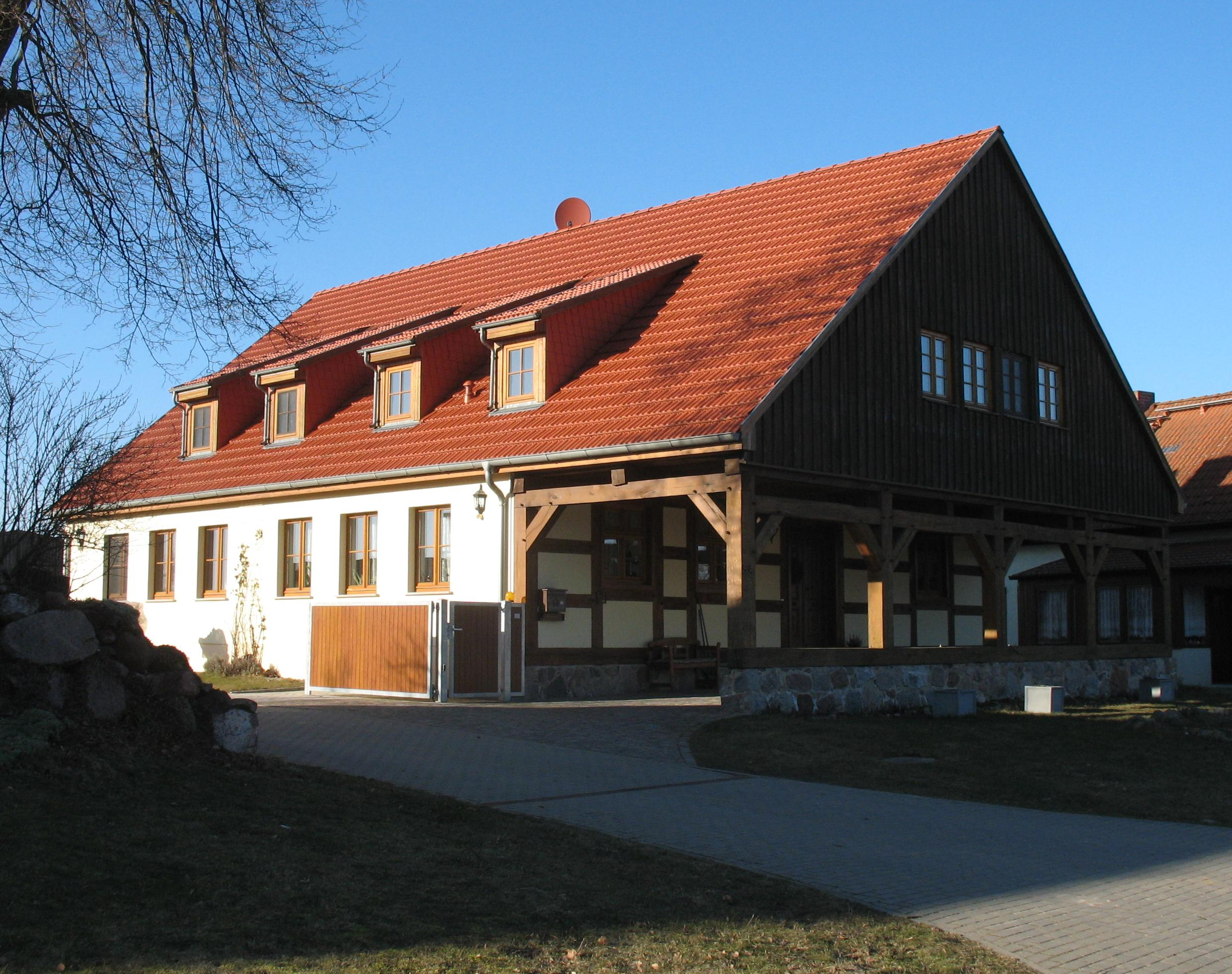
Alcove house in Schmiedeberg

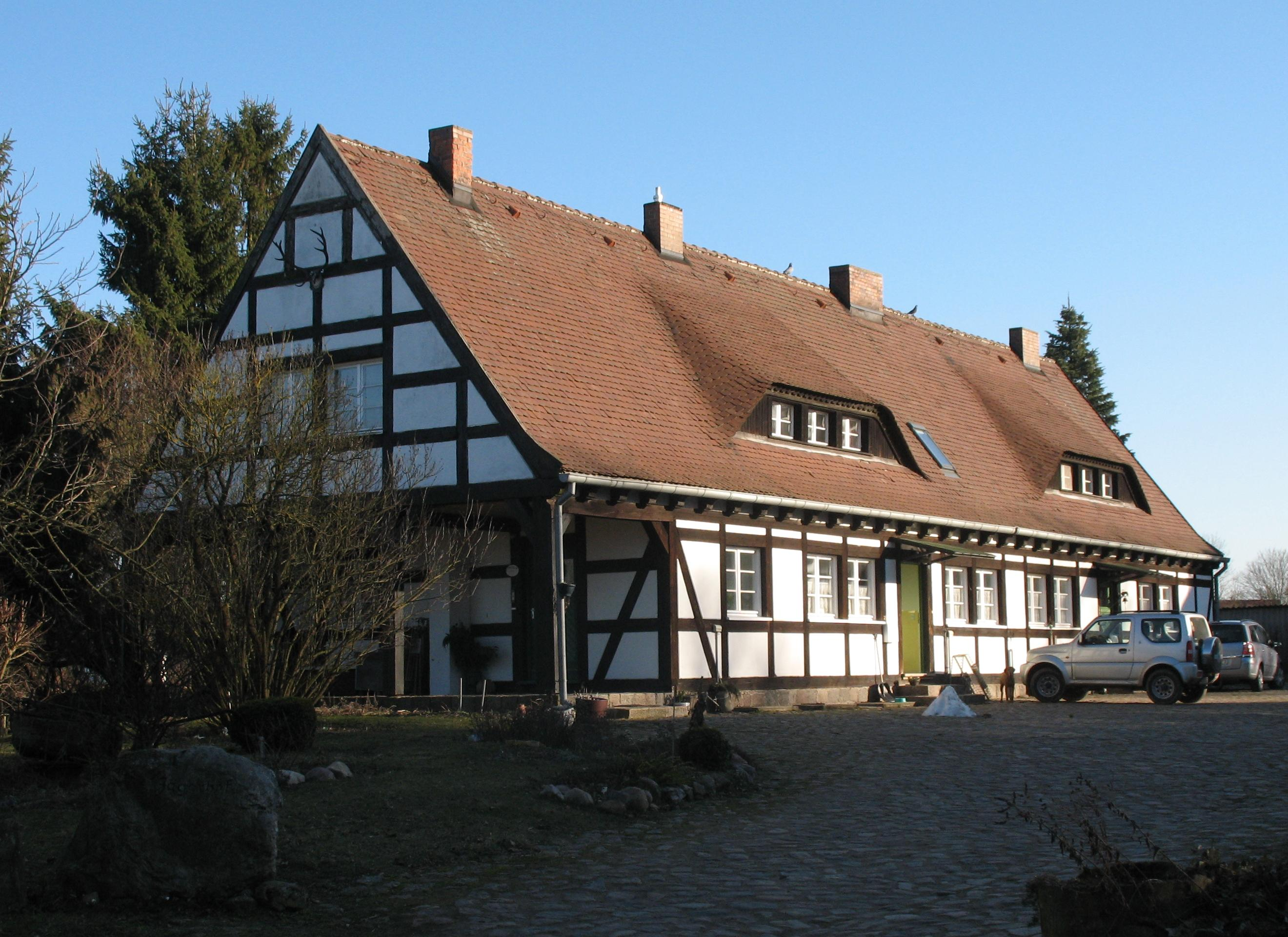
Alcove house in Schmiedeberg
Fountain and sculptures by Christian Uhlig

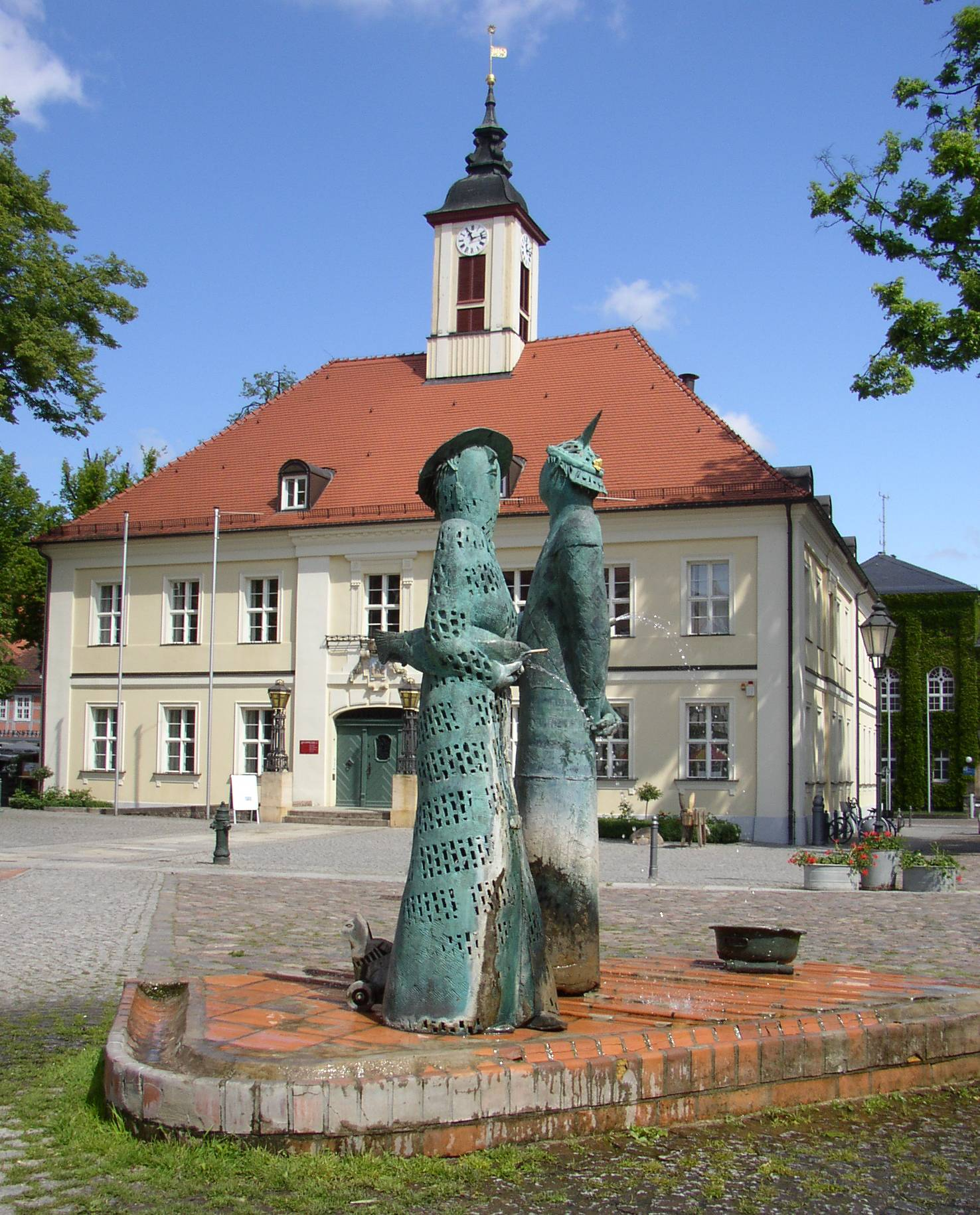

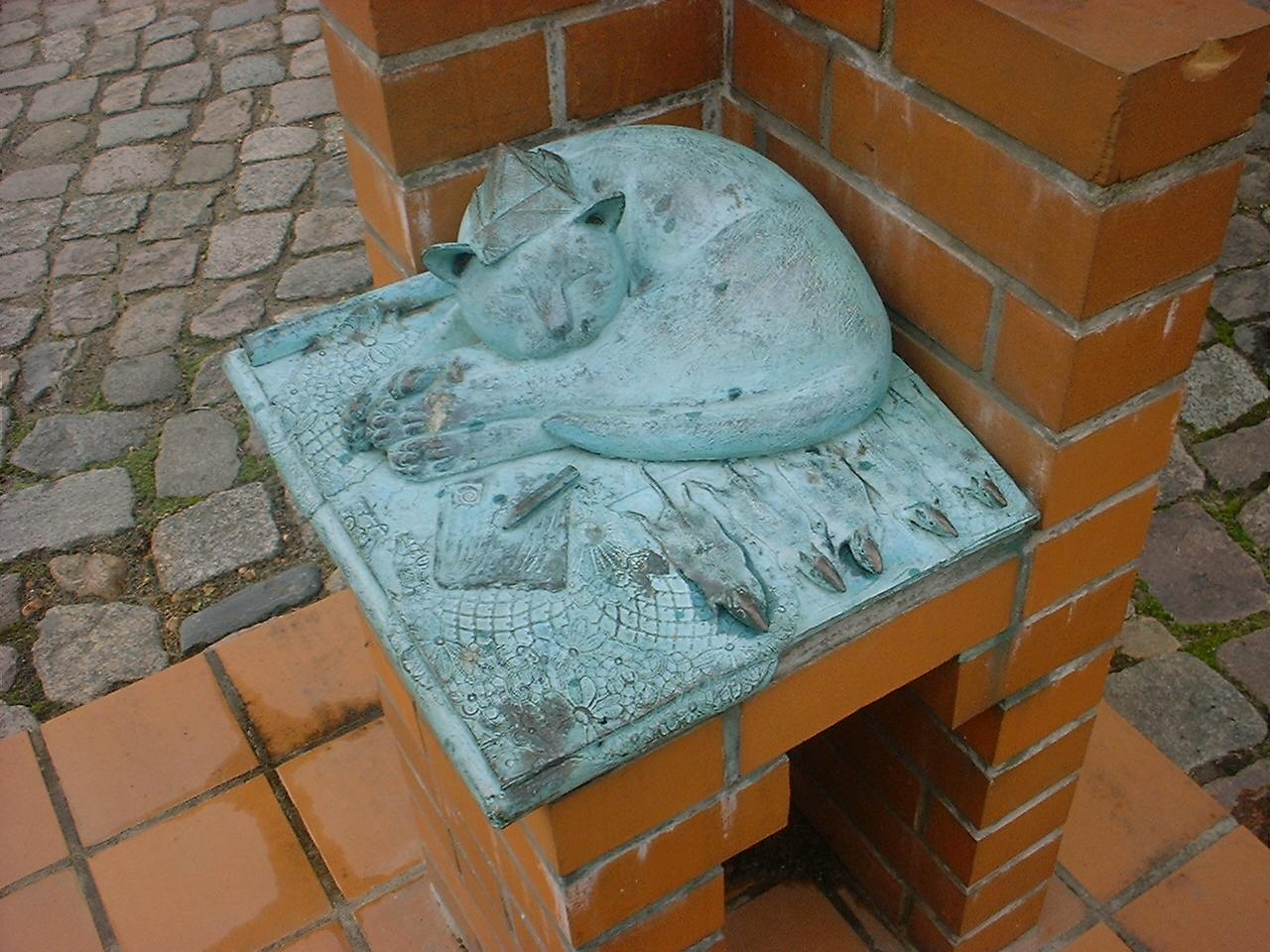

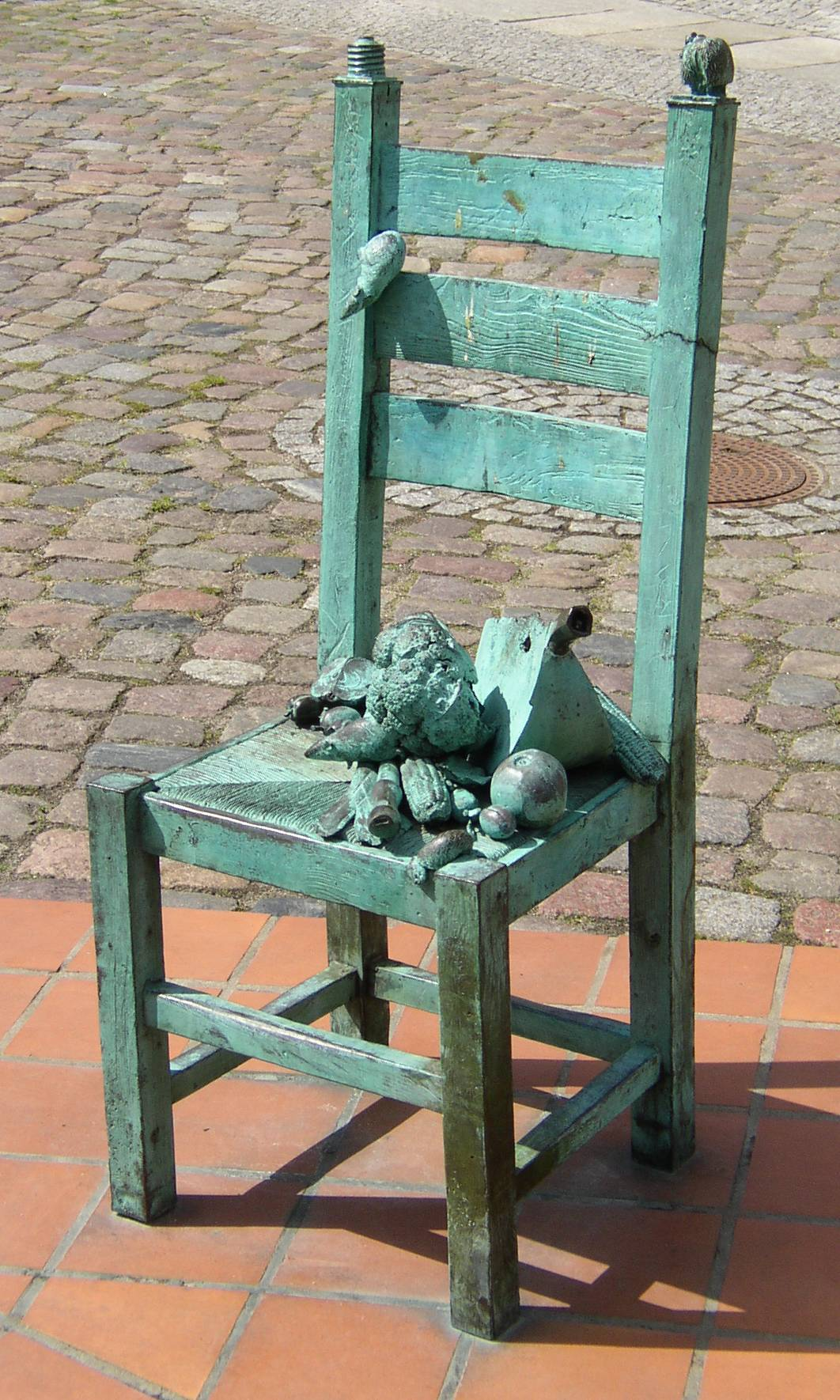

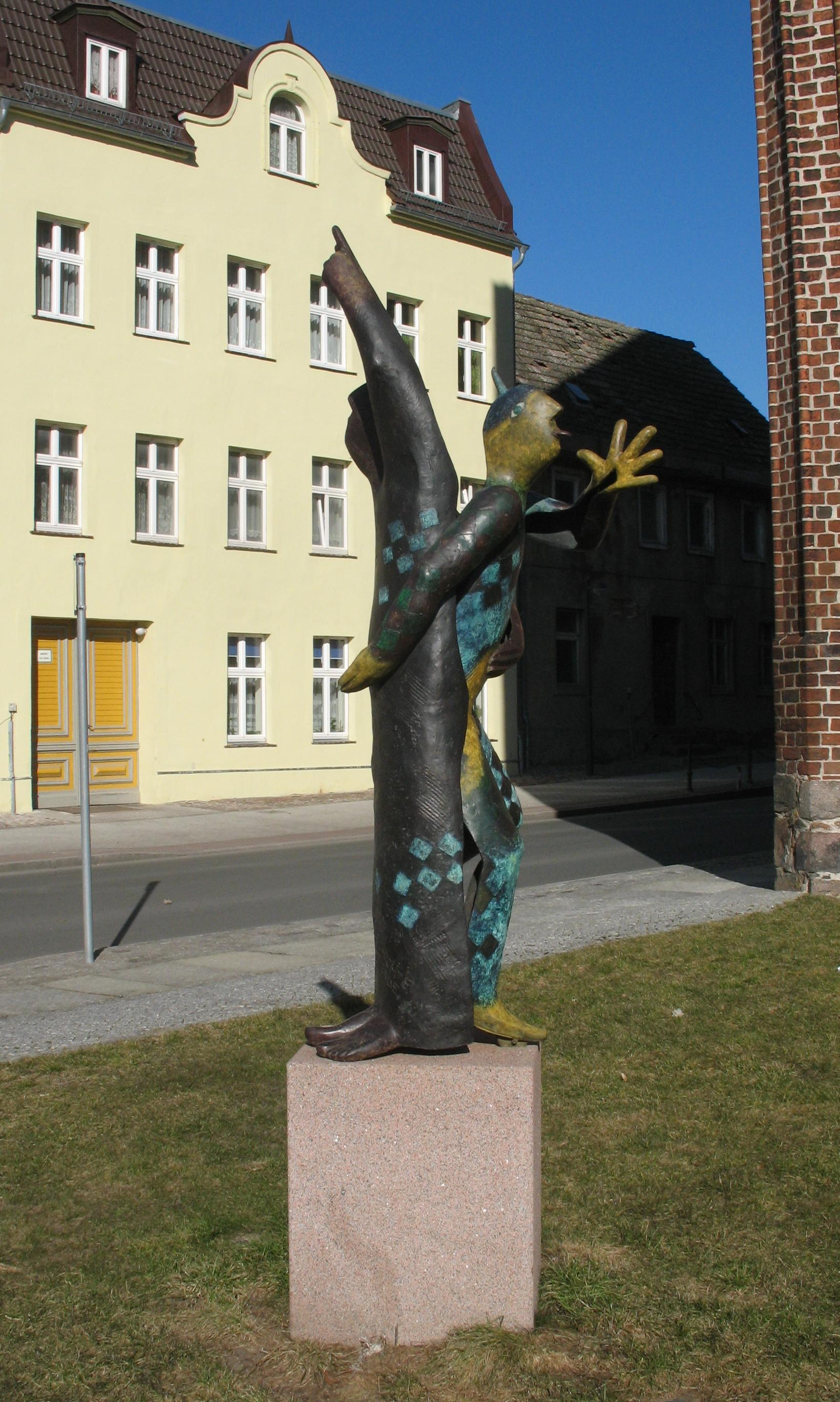

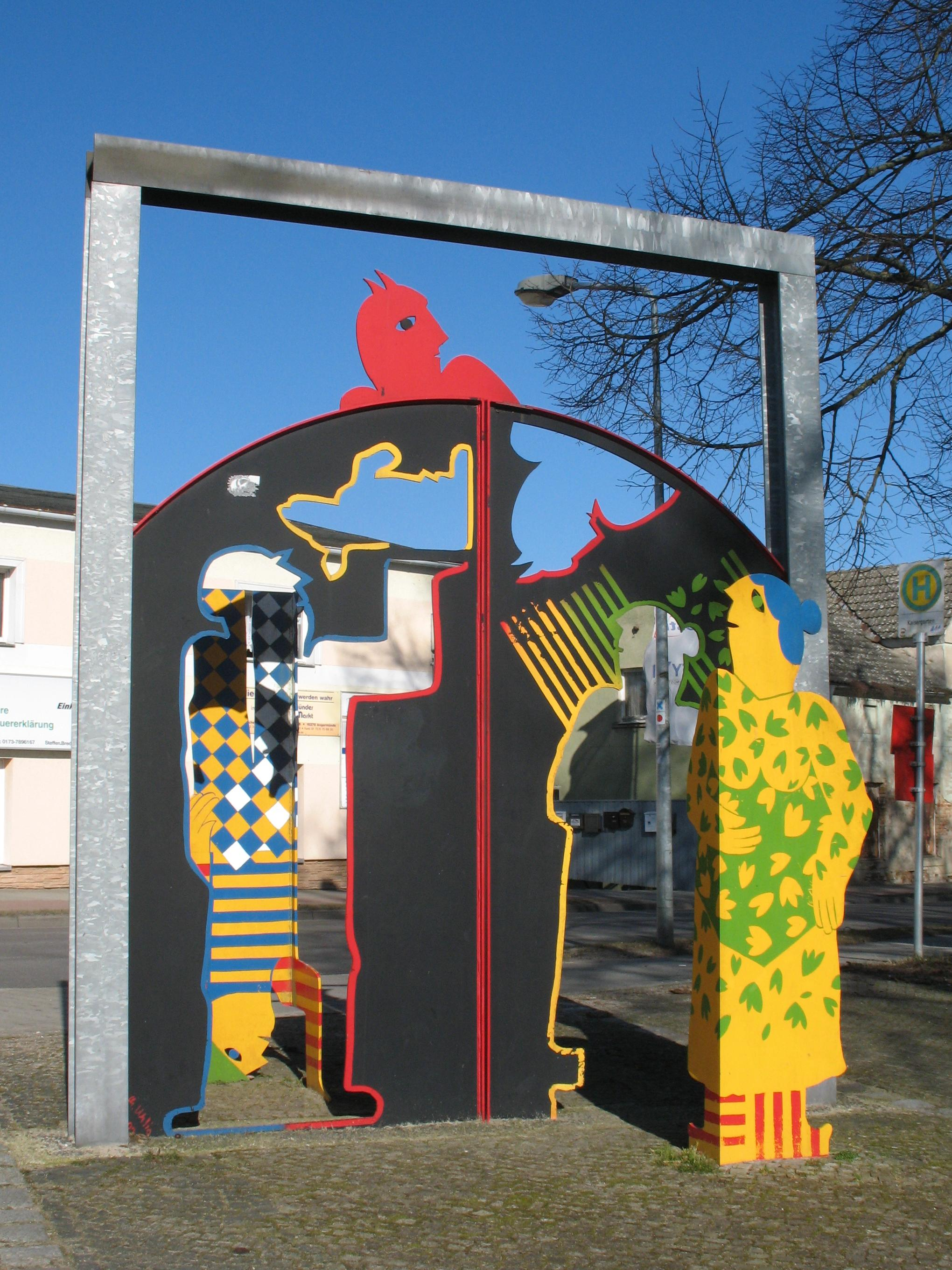

== Sons and daughters of the town ==
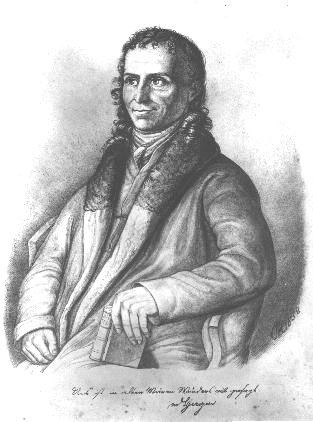
Friedrich Heinrich von der Hagen

- Friedrich Heinrich von der Hagen (1780–1856), German scholar
- Paul Erdmann Isert (1756–1789), surgeon, botanist and planter
- Albert Manthe (1847–1928), sculptor
- Hermann Dietrich (1856–1930), born in Schmargendorf, politician (DNVP), member of Reichstag
- Ehm Welk (1884–1966), writer
- Hans-Erich Voss (1897–1969), Vice Admiral in World War II
- Günter Reimann (1904–2005), economist and journalist
- Heinrich Borgmann (1912–1945), adjutant of Adolf Hitler
- Hartmut Losch (1943–1997), athlete, European champion in discus throw
- Maik Heydeck (born 1965), boxer
- Julia Jäger (born 1970), actress

== Twin cities ==
- Espelkamp, North Rine-Westphalia
- Lüdge, North Rine-Westphalia
- Strzelce Krajeńskie, Poland
- Zurrieq, Malta
