= Cicley Gay =

- Occupation: Nonprofit executive
- Known for: Chair of the Black Lives Matter Global Network Foundation

Cicley Gay is an American activist, nonprofit executive, and philanthropist who serves as chair of the board of the Black Lives Matter Global Network Foundation (BLMGNF), a position she assumed in 2022 following a restructuring of the organization's leadership amid widespread scrutiny of its finances and governance.

== Career ==
Gay began her career in philanthropy, nonprofit management before going into advocacy and strategic communications. She was the founding director of Students Take Action for New Directions (STAND), a civic engagement initiative designed to educate students about the impact of federal budget priorities on Black communities. She also founded GoGirlGo!, a national youth development program of the Women's Sports Foundation, later serving as the foundation's national director of education and alliances.

Gay later established The Amplifiers, a communications and philanthropic consulting firm advising nonprofit organizations, foundations and social impact initiatives.

=== Black Lives Matter Global Network Foundation ===
In April 2022, the Black Lives Matter Global Network Foundation announced Gay's appointment to its board of directors alongside D'Zhane Parker and Shalomyah Bowers as part of an expansion of the organization's governing board.

Shortly after joining the board, Gay was named chair. Her appointment coincided with increased public scrutiny of the foundation's financial management following disclosures that the organization held approximately US$42 million in assets while facing criticism over transparency and governance.

As chair, Gay stated that the foundation's rapid expansion following the 2020 racial justice protests had outpaced its administrative infrastructure and that the board was implementing new governance and financial oversight measures.

In September 2022, CNN reported that a former executive of the foundation filed a lawsuit alleging retaliation and financial mismanagement. The foundation denied the allegations, describing them as meritless, and Gay continued serving as board chair.

== Reception ==
Gay's appointment received national media attention because it occurred during a period of significant public scrutiny of the Black Lives Matter Global Network Foundation. Associated Press and CNN reported on the leadership transition in the context of broader questions surrounding the foundation's governance, finances, and organizational accountability.

New York Post reported that Gay had previously filed for personal bankruptcy on three occasions before assuming the chairmanship.

In 2026, Gay discussed the Black Lives Matter Global Network Foundation's BLM Sports initiative in an interview with Rolling Out. She said the program was created to address barriers to participation in youth sports, including increasing participation costs, and to support athletes through community-based initiatives.
