= Black Lives Matter Global Network Foundation =

American non-profit organization

Black Lives Matter Global Network Foundation, Inc.
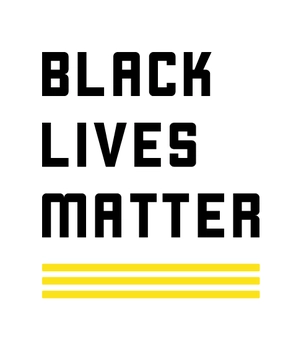
- Logo of the Black Lives Matter Global Network Foundation, Inc.
- Abbreviation: BLMGN; BLMGNF
- Formation: July 13, 2013; 13 years ago
- Founders: Alicia Garza; Patrisse Cullors; Ayọ Tometi
- Type: 501(c)(3) organization
- Tax ID no.: 82-4862489
- Headquarters: 248 3rd St. 305; Oakland, California, U.S.
- Location: International, largely in the U.S.
- Key people: Patrisse Cullors (former executive director)
- Affiliations: Black Lives Matter Political Action Committee; Black Lives Matter Grassroots
- Volunteers: 40 global chapters (2017)
- Website: Official website

The Black Lives Matter Global Network Foundation (BLMGN or BLMGNF) (Note: Media organizations and BLM chapters refer to the Black Lives Matter Global Network Foundation as BLMGN, not BLMGNF. However, the 2020 Impact Report refers to the movement as BLMGNF, despite earlier publications.) is an American 501(c)(3) nonprofit civil rights organization dedicated to promoting the Black Lives Matter movement. The organization is often mistaken for other organizations within the Black Lives Matter movement because it often solely employs the phrase "Black Lives Matter" as its name and it also owns the domain name "blacklivesmatter.com" as its official website. In 2015, BLMGN was the largest and most well-funded organization within the broader Black Lives Matter social movement, and it claims to speak on behalf of the movement. Efforts which were started in late 2020 by its then executive director Patrisse Cullors began to centralize its operations.

The organization was founded in 2013 by three female activists. International but largely based in the United States, the organization advocates for the eradication of systemic racism and the prevention of police violence. Among its core beliefs is that the entire US legal system, mainstream media, and society is inherently white supremacist; and that "policing at-large is an irredeemable institution" and should be defunded.

The organization has been criticized for its statements in support of Marxism, its handling of its finances, and for using its influence with media platforms to suppress negative stories about itself and investigating journalists who publish such stories. The BLMGNF has also been accused of long-term financial mismanagement such as the purchase of mansions, providing lucrative contracts to companies owned by relatives of its founders and a lack of transparency in their fundraisers.

== Organization ==
The organization exists as a decentralized network of local-based chapters. According to its website as of August 2022, there are over 40 chapters. Each local chapter is expected to embrace the set principles of the BLMGN, but it is allowed to internally organize itself in any way it pleases. Each chapter can form its own agenda, so some chapters are more radical than others. Local chapters are mostly funded via direct donations, but they can also apply for more funding from the BLMGN.

BLMGN was initially created by Alicia Garza, Patrisse Cullors, and Opal Tometi in 2013. Garza and Tometi have since left the organization, but still speak at events and keep in contact with Cullors.

On October 9, 2020, the establishment of two new BLM organizations was announced to the public: the Black Lives Matter Political Action Committee (BLM PAC), and BLM Grassroots. Under this new organizational structure, the BLMGN is supposed to serve as the "fundraising body, the grantmaking entity, the amplifier, and the action-oriented think tank of the movement," while BLM Grassroots will continue to perform the actions of its chapters and the BLM PAC will push for political change. In November 2020, Patrisse Cullors, the sole BLMGN board member, was appointed executive director of the BLMGN.

Before handling donations directly, BLMGN was previously funded by donations and grants which it received from the Black Lives Matter Support Fund, which was hosted on the donation platform Tides as of July 2, 2020. According to Tides, the BLMGN made the move after its previous fiscal sponsor, Thousand Currents, decided to discontinue its fiscal sponsorships in order to focus on its core grantmaking work.

The Black Lives Matter Global Network Foundation is a member of the coalition organization Movement for Black Lives.

On April 27, 2022, the BLMGN announced that its expanded Board of Directors will include Cicley Gay, D'zhane Parker and Shalomyah Bowers.

=== Black Lives Matter Political Action Committee ===
In 2015, an unaffiliated PAC which is entitled the "Black Lives Matter PAC LLC" was established by St. Louis based activists. Alicia Garza stated that the PAC was in no way endorsed by the BLMGN and she also stated that BLM was not interested in endorsing political candidates. When the Democratic National Committee adopted a resolution in solidarity with the movement in late August 2015 in which it specifically mentioned the BLMGN's founders, a statement on the BLMGN Facebook page stated that "[w]e do not now, nor have we ever, endorsed or affiliated with the Democratic Party, or with any party. The Democratic Party, like the Republican and all political parties, have historically attempted to control or contain black people's efforts to liberate ourselves. True change requires real struggle, and that struggle will be in the streets and led by the people, not by a political party."

After the departure of Alicia Garza and Opal Tometi, the remaining BLMGN founder Patrisse Cullors announced the establishment of the first BLMGN-sponsored political action committee, the Black Lives Matter Political Action Committee, in the October 9, 2020, 2020 Impact Report document. The move was noted as being unusual for a grassroots movement with no central leadership. The BLM PAC announced plans to endorse a slate of candidates ahead of the general election. Since its founding as a Super-PAC, BLM PAC has notably supported Raphael Warnock and Jon Ossoff during the 2020–21 United States Senate special election in Georgia and 2020–21 United States Senate election in Georgia, respectively.

=== Black Lives Matter Grassroots ===
The establishment of Black Lives Matter Grassroots and the establishment of the BLM PAC were simultaneously announced on October 9, 2020, in the "2020 Impact Report" document. It seeks to retain the original BLM movement's origins and unify its many chapters under the new BLM Grassroots name. It pushes for more unified, targeted stances on various issues which impact the black community, along with social and economic justice in general.

== History ==
=== Formation ===
After the 2013 acquittal of George Zimmerman for the killing of Trayvon Martin in 2012, activist Alicia Garza woke up crying in the middle of the night and decided to write about her emotions in a Facebook post. In the post, Garza stated that she was surprised "at how little Black lives matter". The post would inspire Garza's friend Patrisse Cullors to create the hashtag #BlackLivesMatter on July 15, 2013. Garza and Cullors would reach out to their associate Opal Tometi to help establish Tumblr and Twitter accounts using the hashtag and where users could share relevant personal stories. Garza put the "Black Lives Matter" slogan on signs and displayed them in a local shoe shop. Cullors led a march down Rodeo Drive in Beverly Hills with the slogan on her sign. Eventually, the slogan and hashtag would gain popularity.

The first chapter of the BLMGN organization would be organized in Los Angeles in 2013 with the help of Melina Abdullah. The first chapter would consist of 30 people, notably artists, students, organizers, and mothers.

=== Early activities ===
During 2014 protests in Ferguson Garza, Cullors, and Tometi organized "Freedom Rides" to Ferguson. 500 people would sign up and travel to Ferguson in these "Freedom Rides". Protesters throughout Ferguson would adopt the slogan "Black Lives Matter" throughout the months-long protests. The organization's involvement in protests in Ferguson and the slogan's popularity brought the organization and the Black Lives Matter movement to national attention. New found popularity sparked a rise of other Black Lives Matter organizations that were independent of the BLMGN, as well as new chapters of the BLMGN forming in other cities.

By August 31, 2015, BLMGN claimed 26 chapters nationwide.

On September 6, 2016, the International Development Exchange (IDEX, now known as Thousand Currents) announced a new partnership in which IDEX provided "fiduciary oversight, financial management, and other administrative services to BLM." As a 501(c)(3) organization, IDEX could receive tax-deductible grants, donations and gifts on behalf of BLM. The announcement highlighted providing "learning exchange and alliance building opportunities" between the 'BLM Network' and IDEX's partners in Africa. At this time, IDEX stated BLMGN had 37 chapters within the US and 5 outside.

=== George Floyd protests and subsequent growth ===
After the murder of George Floyd and later protests many people tried to donate money to the BLMGN but often accidentally donated money to a similarly named organization called the "Black Lives Matter Foundation." The BLMGN would itself receive around 1.1 million donations averaging about $33 each after the murder of George Floyd. The BLMGN would soon create a 12 million dollar fund to aid its local chapters activities and other independent grassroots organizations.

BLMGN received millions worth of donations from several large corporations, including but not limited to: Amazon, which donated part of 10M to BLMGN; Coca-Cola, which donated $500,000; Microsoft, which donated $250,000; Airbnb, which donated $500,000; Intel, which donated part of 1M; and Google, which donated part of 2.35M. Some of the largest donations to BLMGN among major celebrities included: Korean boyband BTS, which donated 1M directly to BLMGN and whose fans then matched with another 1.2M donated in part to BLMGN; and singer-songwriter The Weeknd who gave $250,000 to BLMGN in 2016, and another $200,000 in 2020. CharityWatch Executive Director Laurie Styron claimed that public support received from major corporations and public figures in the wake of the George Floyd protests likely motivated small-dollar donors into giving to the group.

BLMGN claimed $90 million in donations for 2020, with an end-year balance of $60 million. BLMGN wanted to scale their activity in proportion to their incoming finances, leading to $21.7 million in grants to Black Lives Matter chapters and other POC-led activist groups.

On May 27, 2021, Patrisse Cullors announced she was stepping down from her role as executive director of BLMGN to focus on the upcoming release of her second book and multi-year TV development deal with Warner Bros. Two new interim senior executives were brought aboard to steer the organization for the immediate future: Monifa Bandele, a longtime BLM organizer and founder of the Malcolm X Grassroots Movement in New York City, and Makani Themba, an early backer of the BLM movement and chief strategist at Higher Ground Change Strategies in Jackson, Mississippi. The move came amidst controversy over Patrisse Cullors' recent purchases of real estate, the foundation's finances, and her personal wealth. Cullors' claimed that the controversy was an attempt to discredit her character.

Sometime between May and June 2021, BLMGN met Biden-Harris White House officials to discuss their agenda. During the meeting, BLMGN leaders expressed disappointment in the administration's handling of issues relating to Black people. CNBC claimed this lead some to believe the organization may have less clout within the Biden White House than it had hoped for.

On September 3, 2021, Monifa Bandele and Makani Themba issued a statement stating that "although a media advisory was released indicating that we were tapped to play the role of Senior Co-Executives at BLMGNF, we were not able to come to an agreement with the acting Leadership Council about the scope of our work and authority. As a result, we did not have the opportunity to serve in this capacity. We wanted to be sure to inform our community of this fact as we move on to serve our movement in other ways."

As of mid-2021, BLMGN had spent more than half of the $90 million it made in 2020 on smaller organizations, consultants, including $840,993 annually to Paul Cullors, a family member of Patrisse Cullors, and real estate, leaving BLMGN with $42 million in assets.

In March 2023, Adidas withdrew a lawsuit without prejudice related to BLMGNF's trademarking a design of three parallel stripes claiming it would confuse customer's with Adidas' own three stripe branding. A source close to the company told Reuters the about-turn was due to fears people would misinterpret Adidas' trademark objection with opposition to BLMGNF's mission.

In May 2023, IRS tax filings showed BLMGNF raised just over $9 million in its previous July 1, 2021 to June 30, 2022 fiscal year, well below the $79 million in its previous tax filing, which was below the $90 million raised in its first year as a tax-exempt organization in 2020. The organization also spent more than it earned, and was down to $30 million in total assets from $42 million previously reported. BLMGNF cut expenses by 55%, but continued its relationship with retired BLMGNF board member Patrisse Cullors' brother by paying him over $1.6 million for contracted security services. Furthermore, board secretary Shalomyah Bower's consulting firm was paid over $1.7 million in the period, and received the lion's share of the foundation's spending on consultants. It also showed a loss of $961,000 on a securities sale of $172,000, as the value of its investment account fell by roughly $10 million. BLMGNF revealed to the Associated Press that it had invested roughly a third ($32 million) of its $90 million in investment accounts.

== Controversies ==
=== Statements ===
The foundation's success and global reach have elicited conservative scrutiny of its statements.

==== Marxism ====
Founder Patrisse Cullors stated she and co-founder Garza were "trained Marxists" in a 2015 interview that resurfaced in 2020. This alarmed conservatives like Ben Carson, Rudy Giuliani, Mark Levin, and others.

There is no single definitive Marxist theory the group subscribes to, but its proclamations regarding the nuclear family are in line with classical Marxist thought. A note on the foundation's list of beliefs regarding disrupting the nuclear family alarmed conservatives and libertarians. It was removed from the foundation's website in 2020:

"We disrupt the Western-prescribed nuclear family structure requirement by supporting each other as extended families and 'villages' that collectively care for one another, especially our children, to the degree that mothers, parents, and children are comfortable."

==== Venezuela and Cuba ====
Founder Ayọ Tometi was invited by the Venezuelan government to be an electoral observer for the parliamentary elections in December 2015. Tometi stated she was "in a place where there is intelligent political discourse" and that the country appears to "have a truly thriving and rigorous democratic system."

During the 2021 Cuban protests, the BLMGN released a statement calling for the United States government to lift its embargo on Cuba and praised the Cuban government for its "solidarity with oppressed peoples of African descent", adding "The people of Cuba are being punished by the U.S. government because the country has maintained its commitment to sovereignty and self-determination". BLMGN also claimed that the protests were caused by the "U.S. federal government's inhumane treatments of Cubans." BLMGN's apparent praise of the Cuban government received criticism due to the Cuban government's history of systemic racism and for ignoring the issues raised by Cuban protesters. In an email to NBC News, BLMGN officials said that their statement was "grounded in our unequivocal support for Cuba" and that they sought to amplify the voices of Afro-Cubans protesting oppression "from all actors, including the United States Embargo." The officials also said that "We unequivocally join in solidarity with the Cuban people against repression and violence from internal and unseen external actors" and that "We also understand that Anti-Blackness exists within Cuba and is a Global issue. We struggle for and alongside Black people across the diaspora for liberation and self-sovereignty."

==== Martin Luther King Jr. ====
In a weekly newsletter celebrating Martin Luther King Jr. Day, BLM Los Angeles, an officially chartered chapter of BLM Grassroots and BLGMN, denounced "white moderates and racists that posted their annual MLK quote even though they are the antithesis of his vision and would've denounced Dr. King in the 50s and 60s, when WE quote the Rev. Dr. Martin Luther King Jr, WE evoke his spirit with genuine intention."

=== Associations ===
==== Thousand Currents partnership ====
BLMGN has been criticized for its partnership with the grantmaking organization Thousand Currents, whose vice-chair is former May 19th Communist Organization member Susan Rosenberg. According to Tides as of July 2, 2020, Thousand Currents decided to sunset its fiscal sponsorship of BLM to focus on its core grantmaking activities. The IRS granted BLMGNF tax-exempt status in December 2020, enabling it to operate independently of its former fiscal sponsors Thousand Currents and Tides Foundation.

==== BLM Grassroots leader Melina Abdullah ====
BLM Grassroots, the official subsidiary of BLMGN created in 2020 is led by Melina Abdullah, who also helped found the first BLM chapter in the United States in Los Angeles. Abdullah has expressed support for the Nation of Islam, which has been criticized for black supremacist, anti-white, antisemitic, and anti-LGBT rhetoric by the Southern Poverty Law Center and the Anti-Defamation League.

==== Founder's association with Black Lives Matter at School ====
Founding member of BLMGN Ayọ Tometi officially endorses the separate organization Black Lives Matter at School, which in turn has announced its support of BLM Los Angeles, an officially chartered member of BLM Grassroots and BLMGN. Black Lives Matter at School lists Bill Ayers, co-founder of the now-defunct Weather Underground organization on its endorsements page, and quotes Black Liberation Army member Assata Shakur on its main page.

=== Finances ===
BLMGN's handling of finances has been criticized by both members of the Black Lives Matter movement and by opponents of Black Lives Matter.

The charity assessment organization CharityWatch reports that the group has no whistleblower policy, no document destruction and retention policy, does not document meetings of the board, and had only one board member during its 2020 financial reporting period.

==== BLMGN Chapter statement ====
On November 30, 2020, ten BLMGN chapters filed a joint statement demanding greater "financial transparency, decision making and accountability" from the main BLMGN organization. The authors disputed sole BLMGN board member Patrisse Cullors' appointment as executive director "without the knowledge of the majority of Black Lives Matter chapters across the country and world." The statement went on to criticize the creation of the Black Lives Matter Political Action Committee, and BLM Grassroots, which the authors allege also occurred without their knowledge. In particular, the statement accused BLM Grassroots as having "effectively separated the majority of chapters from BLMGN without their consent and interrupted the active process of accountability that was being established by those chapters."

The authors further stated that "[f]or years there has been inquiry regarding the financial operations of BLMGN and no acceptable process of either public or internal transparency about the unknown millions of dollars donated to BLMGN, which has certainly increased during this time of pandemic and rebellion." The statement claimed that the 12 million dollar grant BLM announced in July 2020 offering chapters up to $500,000 was not equitable, as the money was raised from the organizing abilities of the chapters themselves and did not include the millions donated to BLMGN from other sources.

According to Politico, chapter members had brought up their grievances about a lack of funding as early as 2016, and had prepared to go public a few months prior to the statement's reveal in November 2020. Chapters were encouraged to wait and discuss matters with Cullors privately, which members claim did not go well after they were not allowed to ask questions. Cullors has responded to the accusations stating that the ten chapters were "not formally affiliated with the global network" and were looking for credibility and money. The 2020 Impact Report announced that eleven BLM chapters would no longer be part of the movement, some of them having previously signed onto the statement. These chapters included: Boston; Canada; Chicago; DC; Denver; Detroit; Lansing; Memphis; Philadelphia; South Bend; and Nashville.

As of June 3, 2021, members of the chapter statement and others that have publicly criticized the group's funding and transparency go by the hashtag "#BLM10" and are represented by Rev. T. Sheri Dickinson of the Oklahoma City BLM chapter. According to Dickinson, "I know some of (the families) are feeling exploited, their pain exploited, and that's not something that I ever want to be affiliated with." Cullors has responded that BLMGN does financially support families without making public announcements or disclosing dollar amounts.

==== Real estate and salary dispute ====
In 2021, a controversy arose in some media outlets, following reports that Cullors (or entities associated with her) had purchased several homes during a five-year period. Cullors denied any wrongdoing and defended her actions as an effort to take care of her family and described the criticism as an "effort to discredit and harass me and my family" by the political right. On April 13, the Black Lives Matter Global Network Foundation denied that it had paid for her purchases of real estate and said they had not paid her since 2019, adding that she had only received $120,000 since 2013 for carrying out her work related to the organization.

An April 2022 investigative report by New York Magazine's Intelligencer revealed that the BLMGN had secretly purchased a $6 million house in Southern California in October 2020 with donated funds. In May 2022, Cullors defended the purchase, saying that "We really wanted to make sure that the global network foundation had an asset that wasn't just financial resources" and that "we understood that not many Black-led organizations have property. They don't own their property." However, Cullors admitted that she hosted two parties at the $6 million house, which she regretted.

==== 501(c)(3) transparency, tax concerns, and New Impact Partners allegations ====
The BLMGN is registered as a tax exempt 501(c)(3) organization. In early 2022, BLMGN was asserted to be out of compliance and was subjected to investigation in several states after failure to submit its 2020 IRS tax forms on November 15, 2021, after having been given a six-month extension. The Foundation failed to identify its current leadership or who controlled its more than $60 million in assets, leading the Executive Director of the charity assessment organization CharityWatch to describe it as "a giant ghost ship full of treasure drifting... with no captain, no discernible crew, and no clear direction."

On January 27, 2022, a report by the Washington Examiner stated that the address listed on BLMGN's tax forms was wrong, and that a security guard onsite said there had never been a BLM office at that location. The Examiner further claimed that an unidentified BLM spokesperson stated that the organization does not currently maintain a "permanent office." Likewise, BLMGN's two remaining board members, Shalomyah Bowers and Raymond Howard, would not comment on who controls BLMGN's $60 million war chest after Cullors stepped down in late 2021. CharityWatch Executive Director Laurie Styron stated that the organization had not yet completed its 2020 Form 990 application. "Irrespective of where any person falls on the political spectrum or what their position is on any social justice issue, hopefully, we can all agree that tax-subsidized public charities have an ethical responsibility to be transparent with the public about how they are operating and how the donations they receive are being used. The amount of money involved here is not insignificant." A later Examiner piece clarified that BLMGN failed to submit its 2020 tax forms to the IRS when it was due on November 15, 2021, after previously being granted a six-month extension.

The Examiner further claimed that as BLMGN was not a charity during 2020 in which it received a windfall of cash as a result of the 2020 George Floyd protests, it effectively borrowed the charitable status of its fiscal sponsors Thousand Currents and Tides Foundation. According to Thousand Currents Consolidated Financial Statements 2020, BLMGN was listed as a Delaware nonstock nonprofit foundation during this time. However, said financial statements also showed Thousand Currents transferred $66.5 million directly to BLMGN in October 2020, which was before BLMGN received its 501(c)(3) tax-exempt status from the IRS in December, 2020. Documents provided to the Washington Examiner by the Office of the California Attorney General show that Cullors signed the asset transfer on September 23, 2020. BLMGN's 2020 Impact Report released to the public in February, 2021 stated that it incurred $8.4 million in operating expenses in 2020 and that it closed out the year with $60 million under its control. However, as stated by the Examiner, "BLMGNF reported to the IRS in August 2020 that it expected to incur precisely $12,706,366 in "Professional Fees" expenditures during the same calendar year, a figure $4.3 million higher than the top-line annual spending figure it later reported to the public in February."

The Washington Examiner also raised concerns over board member Raymond Howard, claiming that Howard's LinkedIn profile stated he was the finance and operations manager of New Impact Partners, a consulting firm owned by Howard's sister. A quote from Howard which stated his connection to BLMGNF in the attribution and later removed from New Impact Partner's website, stated that, "New Impact Partners helped my team narrow in on the root cause of our organizational challenge. Together, we truly partnered to define solutions and created a set of clear priorities."

On February 1, 2022, the Washington Examiner published a follow-up piece stating that the Washington Secretary of State Corporations and Charities Division told BLMGN in early January that it must immediately stop fundraising activities in the state due to its lack of financial transparency, failure to submit required financial documents, and failure to register pursuant to the Charitable Solicitations Act. It claimed that BLMGN continuing to solicit donations could result in injunctions and civil penalties of $2,000 per violation. The Examiner stated that BLMGN's charity registration is also out of compliance in Connecticut, Maine, Maryland, New Jersey, North Carolina, and Virginia. It also stated that the conservative watchdog group National Legal and Policy Center is preparing a complaint against BLMGN. The Examiner also reported that the California Department of Justice stated the "organization BLACK LIVES MATTER GLOBAL NETWORK FOUNDATION, INC. is delinquent with The Registry of Charitable Trusts for failing to submit required annual report(s)," and vowed to hold the leadership of BLMGN personally liable if it did not submit the required documents within sixty days, as of January 31. On February 4, the National Legal and Policy Center submitted its legal complaints to the attorney generals of Washington and California, in which the Center demanded "a full investigation and audit of this group, and possible criminal sanctions."

On February 4, a day after the Examiner reported BLMGN was still accepting donations in states where it was forbidden to do so, BLMGN's fundraising pages on ActBlue were no longer available. BLMGN stated it had enacted a "compliance council" to right itself after the accusations leveled in the Washington Examiner report. The Examiner also stated that [Shalomyah Bowers], one of BLMGN's two known board members, had gone "underground" by leaving an automated email stating they would be unavailable by phone or email for the first half of February.

On February 4, Indiana Attorney General Todd Rokita told Fox News he launched an investigation into BLM to find out if the organization was a "scam." On February 8, Jerri Mares, spokeswoman for New Mexico Attorney General Hector Balderas, announced that the office is currently "securing compliance" with BLMGN. In February 2022, AmazonSmile removed BLMGNF from its website. BLMGNF recruited the services of high-profile Democratic lawyer Marc Elias and switched its financial reporting requirements from calendar-year to fiscal-year tracking in order to buy more time. The group released its financial statements and Form 990 shortly thereafter. According to BLMGNF, fundraising in all 50 states was relaunched on July 13, 2022, but is still unavailable on AmazonSmile.

In September 2022, a lawsuit was filed accusing BLMGN board member Shalomyah Bowers of "syphoning" more than $10 million from donors. Bowers denied the accusations, calling them "harmful, divisive, and false." The lawsuit itself was filed by BLM Grassroots, which named BLMGNF as a co-defendant along with Bowers. In July 2023, the case was dismissed with Los Angeles County Superior Court Judge Stephanie Bowick stating the plaintiff's evidence "fails to establish ... that it was entitled to any of the donated funds at issue or that defendants have been enriched" and that it had sufficient standing to bring its claims. BLM Grassroots leader Melina Abdulla said the group was "stunned and dismayed" by the order and promised to file an immediate appeal.

=== Activities ===
==== BLM Security Hub ====
On April 4, 2022, the New York Intelligencer reported that a secret, internal 'BLM Security Hub' chatroom monitored social media for negative mentions of BLM and used its influence with platforms to have such negative content removed. As of the article's publishing date, it was not possible to share stories from the Post's disclosure on Cullor's home purchases on Facebook as Meta had deemed such content "abusive." It also claimed that BLMGNF hired private investigators to look into journalists and detractors of the organization, including the author of the piece.

==== Bail ====
On February 14, 2022, BLM member and social justice activist Quintez Brown was charged with attempted murder and four counts of wanton endangerment after firing shots in the campaign headquarters of Democratic candidate for Louisville mayor Craig Greenberg. One day later, the BLMGN-affiliated chapter Black Lives Matter Louisville, teamed up with the Louisville Community Bail Fund to release Quintez Brown by posting Brown's bail with a $100,000 cashier's check that afternoon. Condemnation of the release crossed party lines, with Democratic US Senate candidate Charles Booker joining criticism of the decision, stating that "anyone who has been arrested for attempted murder — and is feared to be a harm to themselves and others — should be in custody." Senate Minority Leader Mitch McConnell lambasted the decision, claiming that the "radical-left bailed their comrade out of jail."

== Accolades ==
In 2021, the foundation won the Olof Palme Prize for "promoting 'peaceful civil disobedience against police brutality and racial violence' across the globe" and was nominated for the Nobel Peace Prize.

== See also ==
- Assata's Daughters
- Movement for Black Lives
